= 2016 Tromsø IL season =

Tromsø
2016 season
- Chairman: Bjørn Nilsen
- Manager: Bård Flovik
- Stadium: Alfheim Stadion
- Tippeligaen: 13th
- Norwegian Cup: Quarterfinal vs Rosenborg
- Top goalscorer: League: Thomas Lehne Olsen (8); All: Thomas Lehne Olsen (13)
Home colours	Away colours

The 2016 season is Tromsø's second season back in the Tippeligaen following their relegation in 2013, their 29th season in the top flight of Norwegian football and their first season with Bård Flovik as their manager.

== Squad ==
Note: Flags indicate national team as defined under FIFA eligibility rules; some limited exceptions apply. Players may hold more than one non-FIFA nationality.

No.	Pos.	Nation	Player
1	GK	NOR	Gudmund Taksdal Kongshavn
3	DF	NOR	Kent-Are Antonsen
4	DF	NOR	Henrik Gjesdal
5	DF	NOR	Magnar Ødegaard
6	MF	NOR	Christian Landu Landu
7	MF	NOR	Morten Gamst Pedersen
8	MF	NOR	Ulrik Jenssen
9	FW	TUN	Sofien Moussa
10	FW	NOR	Thomas Lehne Olsen
11	MF	NOR	Jonas Johansen
12	GK	CRO	Filip Lončarić
14	DF	NOR	Hans Norbye

No.	Pos.	Nation	Player
15	MF	NOR	Magnus Andersen
17	MF	ISL	Aron Sigurðarson
19	MF	NOR	William Frantzen
20	FW	NOR	Christer Johnsgård
22	DF	NOR	Simen Wangberg
23	MF	NOR	Gjermund Åsen
24	FW	NOR	Mikael Ingebrigtsen
25	DF	NOR	Lasse Nilsen
26	DF	NOR	Jostein Gundersen
27	MF	NOR	Fredrik Michalsen
30	FW	NOR	Runar Espejord

== Transfers ==
=== Winter ===
In: Note: Flags indicate national team as defined under FIFA eligibility rules; some limited exceptions apply. Players may hold more than one non-FIFA nationality.

No.	Pos.	Nation	Player
7	MF	NOR	Morten Gamst Pedersen (from (Norway) Rosenborg)
8	MF	SWE	Jens Jacobsson (from (Sweden) Assyriska)
9	FW	TUN	Sofien Moussa (from (Romania) Petrolul Ploiești)
10	FW	NOR	Thomas Lehne Olsen (from (Norway) Strømsgodset)
12	GK	CRO	Filip Lončarić (from (Bosnia and Herzegovina) Zrinjski Mostar)
17	MF	ISL	Aron Sigurðarson (from (Iceland) Fjölnir)
20	FW	NOR	Christer Johnsgård (from (Norway) Senja)
26	DF	NOR	Jostein Gundersen (Promoted)
27	MF	NOR	Fredrik Michalsen (Promoted)

Out: Note: Flags indicate national team as defined under FIFA eligibility rules; some limited exceptions apply. Players may hold more than one non-FIFA nationality.

No.	Pos.	Nation	Player
1	GK	SWE	Benny Lekström (to (Sweden) Sirius)
5	FW	NOR	Morten Moldskred
7	MF	SWE	Marcus Hansson (to (Sweden) Djurgården)
13	FW	CZE	Zdeněk Ondrášek (to (Poland) Wisła Kraków)
16	MF	NOR	Lars Gunnar Johnsen (to (Norway) Tromsdalen)
17	MF	NOR	Remi Johansen (to (Norway) Brann)
21	MF	NOR	Thomas Kind Bendiksen (loan return to (Norway) Molde)
23	GK	NOR	Pål Vestly Heigre (loan return to (Norway) Viking)
29	MF	NOR	Elias Skogvoll (to (Norway) Tromsdalen, previously on loan)
48	MF	CRO	Marin Oršulić (to (Cyprus) Omonia)

=== Summer ===
In: Note: Flags indicate national team as defined under FIFA eligibility rules; some limited exceptions apply. Players may hold more than one non-FIFA nationality.

No.	Pos.	Nation	Player
8	DF	NOR	Ulrik Jenssen (from (France) Lyon)

Out: Note: Flags indicate national team as defined under FIFA eligibility rules; some limited exceptions apply. Players may hold more than one non-FIFA nationality.

No.	Pos.	Nation	Player
8	MF	SWE	Jens Jacobsson (released)

== Competitions ==
=== Tippeligaen ===
==== Results summary ====
Overall								Home						Away					
Pld	W	D	L	GF	GA	GD	Pts	W	D	L	GF	GA	GD	W	D	L	GF	GA	GD
30	9	7	14	36	46	−10	34	6	3	6	20	20	0	3	4	8	16	26	−10

Last updated: 10 November 2016.
Source: see below

==== Results by round ====
Round	1	2	3	4	5	6	7	8	9	10	11	12	13	14	15	16	17	18	19	20	21	22	23	24	25	26	27	28	29	30
Ground	A	H	A	H	A	H	A	H	A	A	H	A	H	A	H	A	H	A	H	A	H	A	H	H	A	H	A	H	A	H
Result	D	D	D	W	L	L	L	W	L	D	L	W	L	W	D	L	D	W	L	L	W	L	W	W	L	L	L	L	D	W
Position	11	12	10	8	11	12	12	11	11	11	11	11	11	11	11	12	12	10	11	12	11	12	12	11	11	13	13	14	13	13

Updated to match(es) played on 10 November 2016. Source: see below
A = Away; H = Home; W = Win; D = Draw; L = Loss

==== Results ====
13 March 2016 1	Molde	1–1	Tromsø	Molde
15:30 CET (UTC+1)	Aursnes 1'; Hestad (yellow card) 41'	Summary	Nilsen (yellow card) 56'; Sigurðarson 70'	Stadium: Aker Stadion; Attendance: 7,745; Referee: Ola Hobber Nilsen

18 March 2016 2	Tromsø	0–0	Start	Tromsø
18:00 CET (UTC+1)	Landu Landu (yellow card) 38'; Wangberg (yellow card) 63'	Summary	Ajer (yellow card) 68'	Stadium: Alfheim Stadion; Attendance: 4,241; Referee: Trygve Kjensli

3 April 2016 3	Odd	0–0	Tromsø	Skien
15:30 CEST (UTC+2)	Bentley (yellow card) 90'; Semb Berge (yellow card) 90'	Summary	Espejord (yellow card) 57'; Johansen (yellow card) 90'	Stadium: Skagerak Arena; Attendance: 7,002; Referee: Trond Ivar Døvle

10 April 2016 4	Tromsø	2–0	Strømsgodset	Tromsø
18:00 CEST (UTC+2)	Espejord 45+1'; Ødegaard (yellow card) 47'; Norbye (yellow card) 77'; Åsen (yellow card) 80'; Moussa 90'	Summary	Adjei-Boateng (yellow card) 74'	Stadium: Alfheim Stadion; Attendance: 3,423; Referee: Martin Lundby

17 April 2016 5	Vålerenga	4–0	Tromsø	Oslo
18:00 CEST (UTC+2)	Brown 41'; Wæhler (yellow card) 56'; Holm 61' (pen.); Zahid 65'; Lindkvist 70'; Jääger (yellow card) 73'	Summary	Pedersen (yellow card) 3'; Olsen (yellow card) 25'; Antonsen (yellow card) 64'	Stadium: Ullevaal Stadion; Attendance: 7,047; Referee: Tom Harald Hagen

21 April 2016 6	Tromsø	1–2	Rosenborg	Tromsø
19:00 CEST (UTC+2)	Moussa 37'; Nordye (yellow card) 45'; Moussa (yellow card) 59'; Johansen (yellow card) 86'	Summary	Jensen 45'; Jensen (yellow card) 59'; Konradsen 72'	Stadium: Alfheim Stadion; Attendance: 5,518; Referee: Tore Hansen

24 April 2016 7	Aalesund	6–0	Tromsø	Ålesund
18:00 CEST (UTC+2)	B. H. Riise (yellow card) 17'; Mos 30', 48', 52'; Boli 41'; Hoff 46'; Þrándarson 82'	Summary	Moussa (yellow card) 57'; Landu Landu (yellow card) 67'	Stadium: Color Line Stadion; Attendance: 5,215; Referee: Espen Eskås

1 May 2016 8	Tromsø	1–0	Brann	Tromsø
18:00 CEST (UTC+2)	Moussa 7'; Sigurðarson (yellow card) 33'; Antonsen (yellow card) 39'	Summary	Hvilsom (yellow card) 49'; Acosta (yellow card) 78'	Stadium: Alfheim Stadion; Attendance: 4,030; Referee: Tommy Skjerven

7 May 2016 9	Viking	2–0	Tromsø	Stavanger
15:30 CEST (UTC+2)	Danielsen (yellow card) 66'; Sverrisson 78'; Adegbenro 85'	Summary	Moussa (yellow card) 62'; Ødegaard (yellow card) 71'	Stadium: Viking Stadion; Attendance: 7,302; Referee: Kai Erik Steen

12 May 2016 10	Sogndal	0–0	Tromsø	Sogndalsfjøra
19:00 CEST (UTC+2)	Koomson (yellow card) 90+4'	Summary		Stadium: Fosshaugane Campus; Attendance: 2,639; Referee: Svein Oddvar Moen

16 May 2016 11	Tromsø	1–2	Bodø/Glimt	Tromsø
15:30 CEST (UTC+2)	Wangberg (yellow card) 45+1'; Ødegaard (yellow card) 72'; Olsen 74'; Antonsen (yellow card) 76'	Summary	Jevtović 64', 77'; Hauge (yellow card) 90+1'	Stadium: Alfheim Stadion; Attendance: 6,343; Referee: Trond Ivar Døvle

21 May 2016 12	Stabæk	0–3	Tromsø	Bærum
15:30 CEST (UTC+2)	Kassi (yellow card) 56'	Summary	Gjesdal 7'; Olsen 25'; Wangberg 49'; Moussa (yellow card) 89'	Stadium: Nadderud Stadion; Attendance: 3,289; Referee: Kim Andre Johnsen

28 May 2016 13	Tromsø	1–2	Sarpsborg 08	Tromsø
15:30 CEST (UTC+2)	Kongshavn (yellow card) 26'; Olsen 39'; F.Michalsen (yellow card) 66'	Summary	Ernemann 2' (pen.), 27' (pen.) (yellow card) 59'; Groven (yellow card) 28'; Thomassen (yellow card) 69'	Stadium: Alfheim Stadion; Attendance: 3,340; Referee: Espen Eskås

1 July 2016 14	Lillestrøm	2–4	Tromsø	Lillestrøm
19:00 CEST (UTC+2)	Martin 14'; Kippe (yellow card) 51'; Jradi 65'; Amundsen (yellow card) 85'	Summary	Olsen 3'; Wangberg (yellow card) 21'; Ingebrigtsen 29'; Moussa 51' (pen.) (yellow card) 72'; Andersen 79'	Stadium: Åråsen Stadion; Attendance: 4,352; Referee: Svein Erik Edvartsen

9 July 2016 15	Tromsø	2–2	Haugesund	Tromsø
18:00 CEST (UTC+2)	Ingebrigtsen 44'; Gundersen 83' (yellow card) 89'	Summary	Miljeteig 22'; Agdestein 71'; Ibrahim (yellow card) 75'	Stadium: Alfheim Stadion; Attendance: 3,118; Referee: Trygve Kjensli

17 July 2016 16	Strømsgodset	1–0	Tromsø	Drammen
15:30 CEST (UTC+2)	Keita (yellow card) 31' (goal) 73'; Madsen (yellow card) 37'; Abu (yellow card) 58'	Summary	Wangberg (yellow card) 23'; Gundersen (yellow card) 70'	Stadium: Marienlyst Stadion; Attendance: 7,123; Referee: Martin Lundby

24 July 2016 17	Tromsø	2–2	Stabæk	Tromsø
18:00 CEST (UTC+2)	Michalsen (yellow card) 23'; Wangberg (yellow card) 44'; Antonsen 76'; Ødegaard (yellow card) 81'; Ingebrigtsen 88'	Summary	Issah (yellow card) 13'; Wangberg 36' (o.g.); Mehmeti 56'	Stadium: Alfheim Stadion; Attendance: 3,441; Referee: Trond Ivar Døvle

31 July 2016 18	Bodø/Glimt	0–3	Tromsø	Bodø
18:00 CEST (UTC+2)	Normann (yellow card) 45'; Moe (yellow card) 79'; Konradsen (yellow card) 89'	Summary	Espejord 35'; Olsen (yellow card) 54'; Sigurðarson 80'; Gundersen 90+1'	Stadium: Aspmyra Stadion; Attendance: 4,382; Referee: Espen Eskås

5 August 2016 19	Tromsø	1–2	Aalesund	Tromsø
18:30 CEST (UTC+2)	Espejord 14'	Summary	Antonsen 4'; Abdellaoue 20'; Þrándarson (yellow card) 44'; Boli (yellow card) 69'	Stadium: Alfheim Stadion; Attendance: 3,335; Referee: Dag Vidar Hafsås

14 August 2016 20	Haugesund	2–1	Tromsø	Haugesund
18:00 CEST (UTC+2)	Stølås 14'; Olsen 89' (o.g.)	Summary	Landu (yellow card) 7'; Ødegaard (red card) 73'; Gundersen 83'; Antonsen (yellow card) 84'; Jenssen (yellow card) 90+4'	Stadium: Haugesund Stadion; Referee: Trygve Kjensli

21 August 2016 21	Tromsø	2–1	Viking	Tromsø
20:00 CEST (UTC+2)	Antonsen (yellow card) 12'; Åsen 13' (yellow card) 41'; Andersen 64' (pen.)	Summary	Ibrahim (yellow card) 49'; Haukås (yellow card) 68'; Dawson (yellow card) 70'; Pedersen 83'	Stadium: Alfheim Stadion; Attendance: 3,412; Referee: Martin Lundby

28 August 2016 22	Rosenborg	3–1	Tromsø	Trondheim
18:00 CEST (UTC+2)	Gytkjær 21', 64' (pen.); Rashani 90+3'	Summary	Espejord 70'; Moussa (yellow card) 83' (yellow-red card) 83'	Stadium: Lerkendal Stadion; Attendance: 17,401; Referee: Svein Oddvar Moen

11 September 2016 23	Tromsø	2–0	Sogndal	Tromsø
15:30 CEST (UTC+2)	Wangberg 26'; Jenssen 41'; Norbye (yellow card) 57'; Espejord (yellow card) 59'; Antonsen (yellow card) 68'; Ingebrigtsen (yellow card) 68'	Summary	Birkelund (yellow card) 42'	Stadium: Alfheim Stadion; Attendance: 3,135; Referee: Espen Eskås

17 September 2016 24	Tromsø	2–1	Lillestrøm	Tromsø
15:30 CEST (UTC+2)	Åsen 45'; Olsen 90'; Antonsen (yellow card) 90+1'	Summary	Malec 66'	Stadium: Alfheim Stadion; Attendance: 3,674; Referee: Tore Hansen

25 September 2016 25	Brann	1–0	Tromsø	Bergen
20:00 CEST (UTC+2)	Vega 28'; Haugen (yellow card) 58'; Barmen (yellow card) 90+3'	Summary		Stadium: Brann Stadion; Attendance: 9,331; Referee: Svein Oddvar Moen

2 October 2016 26	Tromsø	0–2	Molde	Tromsø
18:00 CEST (UTC+2)	Johansen (yellow card) 77'	Summary	Gatt (yellow card) 42'; Gabrielsen (yellow card) 49'; Hestad 52'; Antonsen 79' (o.g.)	Stadium: Alfheim Stadion; Attendance: 3,348; Referee: Kristoffer Hagenes

16 October 2016 27	Start	2–1	Tromsø	Kristiansand
15:30 CEST (UTC+2)	E.Segberg 14'; Salvesen 28'; Skogmo (yellow card) 59'; Vikstøl (red card) 77'; Sandnes (yellow card) 90+1'	Summary	Olsen 4'; Ødegaard (yellow card) 62'; Ingebrigtsen (yellow card) 64'; Antonsen (yellow card) 78'	Stadium: Sør Arena; Attendance: 3,440; Referee: Rohit Saggi

23 October 2016 28	Tromsø	0–3	Vålerenga	Tromsø
15:30 CEST (UTC+2)		Summary	Johansen 49'; Moa 58'; Zahid 66'; Wæhler (yellow card) 80'; Larsen (yellow card) 84'	Stadium: Alfheim Stadion; Attendance: 6,429; Referee: Tom Harald Hagen

30 October 2016 29	Sarpsborg 08	2–2	Tromsø	Sarpsborg
18:00 CET (UTC+1)	Toivomäki (yellow card) 19'; Mortensen 57'; Rosted 66'	Summary	Gjesdal (yellow card) 25'; Olsen 31', 79'; Ingebrigtsen (yellow card) 42'; Jenssen (yellow card) 54'	Stadium: Sarpsborg Stadion; Attendance: 3,962; Referee: Svein-Erik Edvartsen

6 November 2016 30	Tromsø	3–1	Odd	Tromsø
18:00 CET (UTC+1)	Sigurðarson 12' (pen.); Moussa 14'; Gamst Pedersen (yellow card) 64'; Espejord 78'	Summary	Ruud (yellow card) 12'; Occean 65'	Stadium: Alfheim Stadion; Referee: Svein Oddvar Moen

==== Table ====
Pos	Team	Pld	W	D	L	GF	GA	GD	Pts	Qualification or relegation
11	Sogndal	30	8	12	10	33	37	−4	36	
12	Lillestrøm	30	8	10	12	45	50	−5	34	
13	Tromsø	30	9	7	14	36	46	−10	34	
14	Stabæk (O)	30	8	7	15	35	42	−7	31	Qualification for the relegation play-offs
15	Bodø/Glimt (R)	30	8	6	16	36	45	−9	30	Relegation to First Division

Source: Football Association of Norway (in Norwegian), Soccerway
Rules for classification: 1) Points; 2) Goal difference; 3) Goals scored; 4) Head-to-head points; 5) Head-to-head goal difference; 6) Head-to-head away goals scored (between two teams).
(O) Play-off winners; (R) Relegated

=== Norwegian Cup ===
13 April 2016 First Round	Lyn	0–7	Tromsø	Oslo
18:00 CEST (UTC+2)	D.Balto (yellow card) 64'; O.Bakken (yellow card) 82'	Report	Jacobsson (yellow card) 21'; Andersen (yellow card) 24'; Olsen 33', 35'; Moussa 39'; Ingebrigtsen 62', 76'; Gundersen 69'; Michalsen 90+1'	Stadium: Bislett Stadium; Attendance: 2,129; Referee: Ole Alexander Ekeli Valentine

27 April 2016 Second Round	Mjølner	0–2	Tromsø	Narvik
18:00 CEST (UTC+2)	O. Hauknes (yellow card) 65'; B. Henriksen (penalty missed)	Summary	Johnsgård 13', 19'; Åsen (yellow card) 31'; Olsen (penalty missed); Ødegaard (yellow card) 66'	Stadium: Narvik Stadion; Attendance: 540; Referee: Tom-Gjøran Henriksen

4 May 2016 Third Round	Tromsdalen	2–3	Tromsø	Tromsø
18:00 CEST (UTC+2)	T. Vibe (yellow card) 18'; Lysvoll 25', (yellow card) 39'; L. G. Johnsen (yellow card) 56'; Kjæve (yellow card) 71'; Ahamed (yellow card) 81'; M. Johnsen 90+4'	Summary	Moussa (yellow card) 29'; Olsen 44'; Antonsen 67'; Wangberg (yellow card) 75'; Andersen 85'	Stadium: Tromsdalen Stadion; Referee: Per Erik Haugen

25 May 2016 Fourth Round	Tromsø	3–2 (a.e.t.)	Odd	Tromsø
18:00 CEST (UTC+2)	Moussa 13'; Espejord 78'; Olsen 102'	Report	Bentley 24', 44'	Stadium: Alfheim Stadion; Attendance: 1,433; Referee: Trygve Kjensli

21 September 2016 Quarterfinal	Tromsø	1–1 (a.e.t.) (3–5 p)	Rosenborg	Tromsø
20:00 CEST (UTC+2)	Moussa (yellow card) 39'; Olsen 53'; Gundersen (yellow card) 56'; Norbye (yellow card) 80'	Summary	Gersbach (yellow card) 51'; Bakenga (yellow card) 80'; Gytkjær 90'	Stadium: Alfheim Stadion; Attendance: 5,285; Referee: Ola Hobber Nilsen
	Penalties
	Andersen (penalty missed); Ødegaard (penalty scored); Sigurðarson (penalty scored); Ingebrigtsen (penalty scored)		(penalty scored) Helland; (penalty scored) Jensen; (penalty scored) Vilhjálmsson; (penalty scored) Gytkjær; (penalty scored) Bakenga

== Squad statistics ==
As of match played 6 November 2016

=== Appearances and goals ===
No.	Pos	Nat	Player	Total		Tippeligaen		Norwegian Cup	
No.	Pos	Nat	Player	Apps	Goals	Apps	Goals	Apps	Goals
1	GK	(Norway) NOR	Gudmund Taksdal Kongshavn	15	0	14	0	1	0
3	DF	(Norway) NOR	Kent-Are Antonsen	27	2	20+4	1	3	1
4	DF	(Norway) NOR	Henrik Gjesdal	13	1	5+4	1	2+2	0
5	DF	(Norway) NOR	Magnar Ødegaard	31	0	27	0	4	0
6	MF	(Norway) NOR	Christian Landu Landu	33	0	26+2	0	4+1	0
7	MF	(Norway) NOR	Morten Gamst Pedersen	9	0	4+4	0	0+1	0
8	MF	(Norway) NOR	Ulrik Jenssen	13	1	11+1	1	1	0
9	FW	(Tunisia) TUN	Sofien Moussa	23	7	12+7	5	4	2
10	FW	(Norway) NOR	Thomas Lehne Olsen	35	11	24+6	6	5	5
11	MF	(Norway) NOR	Jonas Johansen	17	0	9+5	0	2+1	0
12	GK	(Croatia) CRO	Filip Lončarić	20	0	16	0	4	0
14	DF	(Norway) NOR	Hans Norbye	30	0	24+2	0	4	0
15	MF	(Norway) NOR	Magnus Andersen	34	3	27+2	2	5	1
17	MF	(Iceland) ISL	Aron Sigurðarson	27	3	12+12	3	1+2	0
20	FW	(Norway) NOR	Christer Johnsgård	4	2	0+2	0	1+1	2
22	DF	(Norway) NOR	Simen Wangberg	28	2	23+2	2	3	0
23	MF	(Norway) NOR	Gjermund Åsen	31	2	28+1	2	2	0
24	FW	(Norway) NOR	Mikael Ingebrigtsen	28	5	15+8	3	3+2	2
25	DF	(Norway) NOR	Lasse Nilsen	12	0	5+6	0	1	0
26	DF	(Norway) NOR	Jostein Gundersen	21	4	11+6	3	3+1	1
27	MF	(Norway) NOR	Fredrik Michalsen	8	1	2+4	0	0+2	1
30	FW	(Norway) NOR	Runar Espejord	24	6	15+7	5	1+1	1
Players away from Tromsø on loan:
Players who left Tromsø during the season:
8	MF	(Sweden) SWE	Jens Jacobsson	2	0	0	0	1+1	0

=== Goal scorers ===
Place	Position	Nation	Number	Name	Tippeligaen	Norwegian Cup	Total
1	FW	(Norway)	10	Thomas Lehne Olsen	8	5	13
2	FW	(Tunisia)	9	Sofien Moussa	5	2	7
3	FW	(Norway)	30	Runar Espejord	5	1	6
4	FW	(Norway)	24	Mikael Ingebrigtsen	3	2	5
5	DF	(Norway)	26	Jostein Gundersen	3	1	4
6	MF	(Iceland)	17	Aron Sigurðarson	3	0	3
6	MF	(Norway)	15	Magnus Andersen	2	1	3
8	DF	(Norway)	22	Simen Wangberg	2	0	2
8	MF	(Norway)	23	Gjermund Åsen	2	0	2
8	DF	(Norway)	3	Kent-Are Antonsen	1	1	2
8	FW	(Norway)	20	Christer Johnsgård	0	2	2
12	DF	(Norway)	4	Henrik Gjesdal	1	0	1
12	MF	(Norway)	8	Ulrik Jenssen	1	0	1
12	MF	(Norway)	27	Fredrik Michalsen	0	1	1
				TOTALS	36	16	52

=== Disciplinary record ===
Number	Nation	Position	Name	Tippeligaen		Norwegian Cup		Total	
Number	Nation	Position	Name	Yellow card	Red card	Yellow card	Red card	Yellow card	Red card
1	(Norway)	GK	Gudmund Taksdal Kongshavn	1	0	0	0	1	0
3	(Norway)	DF	Kent-Are Antonsen	6	0	1	0	7	0
4	(Norway)	DF	Henrik Gjesdal	0	0	1	0	1	0
5	(Norway)	DF	Magnar Ødegaard	5	0	1	0	6	0
6	(Norway)	MF	Christian Landu Landu	2	0	0	0	2	0
7	(Norway)	MF	Morten Gamst Pedersen	1	0	1	0	2	0
8	(Sweden)	MF	Jens Jacobsson	0	0	1	0	1	0
8	(Norway)	MF	Ulrik Jenssen	2	0	0	0	2	0
9	(Tunisia)	FW	Sofien Moussa	7	1	2	0	9	1
10	(Norway)	FW	Thomas Lehne Olsen	1	0	1	0	2	0
11	(Norway)	MF	Jonas Johansen	3	0	0	0	3	0
14	(Norway)	DF	Hans Norbye	3	0	1	0	4	0
15	(Norway)	MF	Magnus Andersen	0	0	2	0	2	0
17	(Iceland)	MF	Aron Sigurðarson	1	0	0	0	1	0
22	(Norway)	DF	Simen Wangberg	4	0	2	0	6	0
23	(Norway)	MF	Gjermund Åsen	2	0	1	0	3	0
24	(Norway)	FW	Mikael Ingebrigtsen	3	0	0	0	3	0
25	(Norway)	DF	Lasse Nilsen	1	0	0	0	1	0
26	(Norway)	DF	Jostein Gundersen	2	0	1	0	3	0
27	(Norway)	MF	Fredrik Michalsen	2	0	0	0	2	0
30	(Norway)	FW	Runar Espejord	2	0	0	0	2	0
			TOTALS	52	1	9	0	61	1
