= 2015 Tromsø IL season =

Tromsø
2015 season
- Chairman: Bjørn Nilsen
- Manager: Steinar Nilsen
- Stadium: Alfheim Stadion
- Tippeligaen: 13th
- Norwegian Cup: Second Round vs Senja
- Top goalscorer: League: Zdeněk Ondrášek (9); All: Zdeněk Ondrášek (10)
| Home colours | Away colours |

The 2015 season is Tromsø's first season back in the Tippeligaen following their relegation in 2013, their 28th season in the top flight of Norwegian football and their second full season with Steinar Nilsen as their manager.

== Squad ==
As of 25 January 2015.

Note: Flags indicate national team as defined under FIFA eligibility rules; some limited exceptions apply. Players may hold more than one non-FIFA nationality.

| No. | Pos. | Nation | Player |
|---|---|---|---|
| 1 | GK | SWE | Benny Lekström |
| 2 | DF | NOR | Magnar Ødegaard |
| 3 | DF | NOR | Kent-Are Antonsen |
| 4 | DF | NOR | Henrik Gjesdal |
| 5 | FW | NOR | Morten Moldskred |
| 6 | MF | NOR | Christian Landu Landu |
| 7 | MF | SWE | Marcus Hansson |
| 8 | MF | NOR | Gjermund Åsen |
| 11 | DF | NOR | Jonas Johansen |
| 12 | GK | NOR | Gudmund Taksdal Kongshavn |
| 13 | FW | CZE | Zdeněk Ondrášek |
| 14 | DF | NOR | Hans Norbye |
| 15 | MF | NOR | Magnus Andersen |

| No. | Pos. | Nation | Player |
|---|---|---|---|
| 16 | MF | NOR | Lars Gunnar Johnsen |
| 17 | MF | NOR | Remi Johansen |
| 19 | MF | NOR | William Frantzen |
| 21 | MF | NOR | Thomas Kind Bendiksen (on loan from Molde) |
| 22 | DF | NOR | Simen Wangberg |
| 23 | GK | NOR | Pål Vestly Heigre (on loan from Viking) |
| 24 | FW | NOR | Mikael Ingebrigtsen |
| 25 | DF | NOR | Lasse Nilsen |
| 26 | DF | NOR | Jostein Gundersen |
| 27 | MF | NOR | Fredrik Michalsen |
| 29 | MF | NOR | Elias Skogvoll |
| 30 | FW | NOR | Runar Espejord |
| 48 | MF | CRO | Marin Oršulić |

== Transfers ==
=== Winter ===
In: Note: Flags indicate national team as defined under FIFA eligibility rules; some limited exceptions apply. Players may hold more than one non-FIFA nationality.

| No. | Pos. | Nation | Player |
|---|---|---|---|
| 2 | DF | NOR | Magnar Ødegaard (from (Norway) Molde) |
| 6 | MF | NOR | Christian Landu Landu (from (Norway) Viking) |
| 7 | MF | SWE | Marcus Hansson (from (Sweden) Gefle IF) |
| 8 | MF | NOR | Gjermund Åsen (from (Norway) Ranheim) |
| 12 | GK | NOR | Gudmund Taksdal Kongshavn (from (Norway) Vålerenga) |
| 23 | GK | NOR | Pål Vestly Heigre (on loan from (Norway) Viking) |

Out: Note: Flags indicate national team as defined under FIFA eligibility rules; some limited exceptions apply. Players may hold more than one non-FIFA nationality.

| No. | Pos. | Nation | Player |
|---|---|---|---|
| 7 | DF | FIN | Miika Koppinen (retired) |
| 8 | MF | NOR | Thomas Kind Bendiksen (to (Norway) Molde) |
| 27 | GK | NOR | Lars Herlofsen (to (Norway) Sandefjord) |

=== Summer ===
In: Note: Flags indicate national team as defined under FIFA eligibility rules; some limited exceptions apply. Players may hold more than one non-FIFA nationality.

| No. | Pos. | Nation | Player |
|---|---|---|---|
| 21 | MF | NOR | Thomas Kind Bendiksen (on loan from (Norway) Molde) |
| 48 | MF | CRO | Marin Oršulić (from (Bulgaria) CSKA Sofia) |

Out: Note: Flags indicate national team as defined under FIFA eligibility rules; some limited exceptions apply. Players may hold more than one non-FIFA nationality.

| No. | Pos. | Nation | Player |
|---|---|---|---|
| 10 | MF | NOR | Thomas Drage (to (Norway) Sogndal) |

== Competitions ==
=== Tippeligaen ===
==== Results summary ====
| Overall | | | | | | | | Home | | | | | | Away | | | | | |
| Pld | W | D | L | GF | GA | GD | Pts | W | D | L | GF | GA | GD | W | D | L | GF | GA | GD |
|---|---|---|---|---|---|---|---|---|---|---|---|---|---|---|---|---|---|---|---|
| 30 | 7 | 8 | 15 | 34 | 48 | −14 | 29 | 5 | 6 | 4 | 20 | 21 | −1 | 2 | 2 | 11 | 14 | 27 | −13 |

Last updated: 8 November 2015.
Source: see below

==== Results by round ====
| Round | 1 | 2 | 3 | 4 | 5 | 6 | 7 | 8 | 9 | 10 | 11 | 12 | 13 | 14 | 15 | 16 | 17 | 18 | 19 | 20 | 21 | 22 | 23 | 24 | 25 | 26 | 27 | 28 | 29 | 30 |
|---|---|---|---|---|---|---|---|---|---|---|---|---|---|---|---|---|---|---|---|---|---|---|---|---|---|---|---|---|---|---|
| Ground | H | A | H | A | H | A | A | H | A | H | A | H | A | H | A | H | A | H | A | H | A | H | H | A | H | A | H | A | H | A |
| Result | L | L | D | W | L | L | L | L | L | D | D | W | L | W | D | W | L | L | L | D | L | D | D | L | D | L | W | L | W | W |
| Position | 11 | 15 | 13 | 11 | 14 | 15 | 15 | 15 | 16 | 15 | 15 | 14 | 14 | 14 | 14 | 14 | 14 | 14 | 14 | 15 | 15 | 15 | 14 | 15 | 14 | 14 | 13 | 13 | 13 | 13 |

Updated to match(es) played on 8 November 2015. Source: see below
A = Away; H = Home; W = Win; D = Draw; L = Loss

==== Results ====
| 6 April 2015 1 | Tromsø | 0–1 | Sarpsborg 08 | Tromsø |
| 18:00 CEST (UTC+2) | R.Johansen (yellow card) 52' | Summary | Hansen 54'; Trondsen (yellow card) 57'; Nordvik (yellow card) 69' | Stadium: Alfheim stadion Attendance: 4,035; Referee: Ola Hobber Nilsen |

| 12 April 2015 2 | Viking | 3–1 | Tromsø | Stavanger |
| 18:00 CEST (UTC+2) | Ødegaard 20' (o.g.); Bytyqi (yellow card) 45+2' (goal) 75'; Berisha 56'; Nisja (yellow card) 84' | Summary | Åsen 46' | Stadium: Viking stadion Attendance: 9,652; Referee: Ken Henry Johnsen |

| 19 April 2015 3 | Tromsø | 1–1 | Lillestrøm | Tromsø |
| 18:00 CEST (UTC+2) | Andersen (yellow card) 33'; Åsen 35'; Hansson (yellow card) 90+1' | Summary | Knudtzon 34' | Stadium: Alfheim Stadion; Attendance: 3,229; Referee: Brage Sandmoen |

| 26 April 2015 4 | Aalesund | 0–2 | Tromsø | Ålesund |
| 18:00 CEST (UTC+2) | Hoff (yellow card) 32'; Barrantes (yellow card) 72' | Summary | Ingebrigtsen 29'; Hansson (yellow card) 77'; Ondrášek 87'; Antonsen (yellow card) 90+2' | Stadium: Color Line Stadion; Attendance: 5,655; Referee: Martin Lundby |

| 30 April 2015 5 | Tromsø | 0–2 | Stabæk | Tromsø |
| 18:00 CEST (UTC+2) | | Summary | Issah (yellow card) 7'; Kassi (yellow card) 22'; Meling (yellow card) 39'; Asante 42'; Grossman 45+5'; Jalasto (yellow card) 52' | Stadium: Alfheim Stadion; Attendance: 3,080; Referee: Ken Henry Johnsen |

| 3 May 2015 6 | Start | 3–1 | Tromsø | Kristiansand |
| 15:30 CEST (UTC+2) | Hollingen 4'; Vilhjálmsson 18'; Ajer 89'; Kristjánsson (yellow card) 90' | Summary | Ondrášek 31'; Antonsen (yellow card) 50' | Stadium: Sør Arena; Attendance: 5,123; Referee: Trond Ivar Døvle |

| 9 May 2015 7 | Mjøndalen | 4–3 | Tromsø | Mjøndalen |
| 15:30 CEST (UTC+2) | Gauseth 38' (pen.), 72'; Olsen (yellow card) 47'; Bernstein 74', 90' | Summary | Åsen 21'; Ondrášek 28', 46' (yellow card) 43'; R.Johansen (yellow card) 74'; Ødegaard (yellow card) 89' | Stadium: Isachsen Stadion; Attendance: 1,949; Referee: Trygve Kjensli |

| 12 May 2015 8 | Tromsø | 4–5 | Vålerenga | Tromsø |
| 18:00 CEST (UTC+2) | Ingebrigtsen 3'; Ondrášek 19'; Andersen 53', 84' | Summary | Stengel 17'; Larsen 41'; Nilsen (yellow card) 46'; Grindheim 74'; Wæhler (yellow card) 76'; Lindkvist 77'; Holm (yellow card) 78', (goal) 87' | Stadium: Alfheim stadion Referee: Tore Hansen |

| 16 May 2015 9 | Bodø/Glimt | 1–0 | Tromsø | Bodø |
| 15:30 CEST (UTC+2) | Cruz (yellow card) 41'; Badou 68' | Summary | Antonsen (yellow card) 7'; Wangberg (yellow card) 84' | Stadium: Aspmyra Stadion; Attendance: 6114; Referee: Ola Hobber Nilsen |

| 25 May 2015 10 | Tromsø | 2–2 | Odd | Tromsø |
| 15:30 CEST (UTC+2) | R.Johansen 3' (yellow card) 56'; Andersen 41'; Ondrášek (yellow card) 49' | Summary | Bentley 7'; Grøgaard (yellow card) 9'; Ruud (yellow card) 50'; Heigre 58' (o.g.); Occéan (yellow card) 68' | Stadium: Alfheim Stadion; Attendance: 3,518; Referee: Tom Harald Hagen |

| 31 May 2015 11 | Rosenborg | 1–1 | Tromsø | Trondheim |
| 20:00 CEST (UTC+2) | Jensen 48'; Eyjólfsson (yellow card) 58' | Summary | Antonsen (yellow card) 27'; Norbye (yellow card) 37'; Andersen 56'; Åsen (yellow card) 90+2' | Stadium: Lerkendal Stadion; Attendance: 14 373; Referee: Ola Hobber Nilsen |

| 5 June 2015 12 | Tromsø | 2–0 | Molde | Tromsø |
| 19:00 CEST (UTC+2) | Antonsen 8'; Ondrášek (penalty missed); Hansson 31' | Summary | Nyland (yellow card) 12'; Singh (yellow card) 70'; Høiland (yellow card) 75' | Stadium: Alfheim Stadion; Attendance: 3 130; Referee: Trygve Kjensli |

| 21 June 2015 13 | Strømsgodset | 2–1 | Tromsø | Drammen |
| 18:00 CEST (UTC+2) | Ogunjimi 4'; Vilsvik (yellow card) 60', (goal) 67' | Summary | Ondrášek 88' | Stadium: Marienlyst Stadion; Attendance: 6,708; Referee: Tore Hansen |

| 28 June 2015 14 | Tromsø | 2–0 | Haugesund | Tromsø |
| 18:00 CEST (UTC+2) | Ondrášek 80'; R.Johansen 85' | Summary | Christensen (yellow card) 38' | Stadium: Alfheim Stadion; Attendance: 3,240; Referee: Dag Vidar Hafsås |

| 5 July 2015 15 | Sandefjord | 1–1 | Tromsø | Sandefjord |
| 18:00 CEST (UTC+2) | Risholt (yellow card) 40'; T.Juel-Nielsen (yellow card) 63'; Mjelde 79' | Summary | Ondrášek (yellow card) 68'; Landu Landu (yellow card) 89'; J.Johansen 90+1' | Stadium: Komplett.no Arena; Attendance: 3,555; Referee: Tore Hansen |

| 12 July 2015 16 | Tromsø | 2–1 | Start | Tromsø |
| 18:00 CEST (UTC+2) | Andersen 23'; Sandnes 63' (o.g.) | Summary | Ajer 19' | Stadium: Alfheim Stadion; Attendance: 3,526; Referee: Trond Ivar Døvle |

| 26 July 2015 17 | Odd | 3–2 | Tromsø | Skien |
| 18:00 CEST (UTC+2) | Nordkvelle 23'; Occéan 44'; Zekhnini 90+2' | Summary | Andersen 31'; Moldskred 83' | Stadium: Skagerak Arena; Attendance: 6,888; Referee: Martin Lundby |

| 2 August 2015 18 | Tromsø | 0–6 | Strømsgodset | Tromsø |
| 18:00 CEST (UTC+2) | Wangberg (yellow card) 89' (yellow-red card) 90' | Summary | Wikheim 6', 48'; Vilsvik 29'; Lehne Olsen (yellow card) 30'; Hanin 50'; Fossum 66', 76' | Stadium: Alfheim Stadion; Attendance: 3,418; Referee: Trygve Kjensli |

| 7 August 2015 19 | Vålerenga | 1–0 | Tromsø | Oslo |
| 19:00 CEST (UTC+2) | Zahid 19'; Stengel (yellow card) 27'; Hallberg (yellow card) 90+2' | Summary | Ondrášek (yellow card) 9'; Landu (yellow card) 75' | Stadium: Ullevaal Stadion; Attendance: 7,629; Referee: Kim Andre Johnsen |

| 16 August 2015 20 | Tromsø | 1–1 | Sandefjord | Tromsø |
| 18:00 CEST (UTC+2) | Åsen (yellow card) 54'; Antonsen 85' | Summary | Fevang (yellow card) 26'; Kirkevold 30' (yellow card) 80' | Stadium: Alfheim Stadion; Attendance: 3,244; Referee: Ola Hobber Nilsen |

| 21 August 2015 21 | Lillestrøm | 1–0 | Tromsø | Lillestrøm |
| 19:00 CEST (UTC+2) | Martin 55' | Summary | Ødegaard (yellow card) 86' | Stadium: Åråsen Stadion; Attendance: 5,550; Referee: Tommy Skjerven |

| 30 August 2015 22 | Tromsø | 1–1 | Rosenborg | Tromsø |
| 20:00 CEST (UTC+2) | Andersen 3'; Hansson (yellow card) 43'; J.Johansen (yellow card) 81'; Norbye (yellow card) 84' | Summary | Søderlund 45+1' (yellow card) 65' | Stadium: Alfheim Stadion; Attendance: 4,507; Referee: Martin Lundby |

| 13 September 2015 23 | Tromsø | 0–0 | Mjøndalen | Tromsø |
| 15:30 CEST (UTC+2) | | Summary | Aasmundsen (yellow card) 19'; Gundersen (yellow card) 90+4' | Stadium: Alfheim Stadion; Attendance: 3,532; Referee: Dag Vidar Hafsås |

| 19 September 2015 24 | Stabæk | 2–1 | Tromsø | Bærum |
| 18:00 CEST (UTC+2) | Kassi 31'; Keita 90+3' | Summary | R.Johansen 58'; Oršulić (yellow card) 83'; Landu Landu (yellow card) 85' | Stadium: Nadderud Stadion; Attendance: 3,456; Referee: Kai Erik Steen |

| 27 September 2015 25 | Tromsø | 1–1 | Aalesund | Tromsø |
| 18:00 CEST (UTC+2) | Oršulić (yellow card) 58'; Espejord 71'; Ondrášek (yellow card) 85' | Summary | R.Johansen 51' (o.g.); Hoseth (yellow card) 66'; Bjørdal (yellow card) 69'; Hoff (yellow card) 78' | Stadium: Alfheim Stadion; Attendance: 3,402; Referee: Trond Ivar Døvle |

| 4 October 2015 26 | Molde | 4–0 | Tromsø | Molde |
| 18:00 CEST (UTC+2) | E.Hestad 19'; Simonsen 36'; Flo 54'; Kamara 79' (pen.) | Summary | Oršulić (yellow card) 59' (yellow-red card) 77' | Stadium: Aker Stadion; Attendance: 8,378; Referee: Tom Harald Hagen |

| 18 October 2015 27 | Tromsø | 3–1 | Viking | Tromsø |
| 20:00 CEST (UTC+2) | Espejord 45+1', 82'; Wangberg (yellow card) 61'; Ødegaard 71' | Summary | Abdullahi 15'; Soares (yellow card) 64'; Sverrisson (yellow card) 77'; Thioune (yellow card) 86' | Stadium: Alfheim Stadion; Attendance: 3,430; Referee: Tore Hansen |

| 24 October 2015 28 | Sarpsborg 08 | 1–0 | Tromsø | Sarpsborg |
| 15:30 CEST (UTC+2) | Wiig 55'; Kachi (yellow card) 76' | Summary | | Stadium: Sarpsborg Stadion; Referee: Espen Berntsen |

| 1 November 2015 29 | Tromsø | 3–1 | Bodø/Glimt | Tromsø |
| 18:00 CET (UTC+1) | Ondrášek 40', 86' (yellow card) 68'; Ingebrigtsen 51'; Oršulić (yellow card) 54' | Summary | Sørloth 30' (yellow card) 64'; Sané (yellow card) 68'; Jacobsen (yellow card) 88' | Stadium: Alfheim Stadion; Attendance: 5,862; Referee: Tom Harald Hagen |

| 8 November 2015 30 | Haugesund | 0–1 | Tromsø | Haugesund |
| 18:00 CET (UTC+1) | Diedhiou (yellow card) 90+4' | Summary | Wangberg (yellow card) 18'; Antonsen 31'; Landu (yellow card) 65'; Lekström (yellow card) 84' | Stadium: Haugesund Stadion; Attendance: 6,372; Referee: Kim Andre Johnsen |

==== Table ====
| Pos | Team | Pld | W | D | L | GF | GA | GD | Pts | Qualification or relegation |
|---|---|---|---|---|---|---|---|---|---|---|
| 11 | Sarpsborg 08 | 30 | 8 | 10 | 12 | 37 | 49 | −12 | 34 | |
| 12 | Haugesund | 30 | 8 | 7 | 15 | 33 | 52 | −19 | 31 | |
| 13 | Tromsø | 30 | 7 | 8 | 15 | 36 | 50 | −14 | 29 | |
| 14 | Start (O) | 30 | 5 | 7 | 18 | 35 | 64 | −29 | 22 | Qualification for the relegation play-offs |
| 15 | Mjøndalen (R) | 30 | 4 | 9 | 17 | 38 | 69 | −31 | 21 | Relegation to First Division |

Source: Football Association of Norway (in Norwegian), Soccerway
Rules for classification: 1) Points; 2) Goal difference; 3) Goals scored; 4) Head-to-head points; 5) Head-to-head goal difference; 6) Head-to-head away goals scored (between two teams).
(O) Play-off winners; (R) Relegated

=== Norwegian Cup ===
| 22 April 2015 First Round | Mo | 1–2 | Tromsø | Mo i Rana |
| 18:00 CEST (UTC+2) | Jørgensen 10'; F.Pettersen (yellow card) 37'; N.Bakksjø (yellow card) 41' | Summary | Drage (yellow card) 15'; Ingebrigtsen 26'; Ondrášek 45' | Stadium: New Sagbakken stadium Attendance: 800; Referee: Adrian Gjendemsjø |

| 6 May 2015 Second Round | Senja | 2–1 | Tromsø | Silsand |
| 19:00 CEST (UTC+2) | Ross 49'; Garfjell 90' | Summary | Espejord 35' | Stadium: Islandbotn; Attendance: 600; Referee: Ole Martin Loe |

== Squad statistics ==
As of match played 8 November 2015

=== Appearances and goals ===
| No. | Pos | Nat | Player | Total | | Tippeligaen | | Norwegian Cup | |
| No. | Pos | Nat | Player | Apps | Goals | Apps | Goals | Apps | Goals |
|---|---|---|---|---|---|---|---|---|---|
| 1 | GK | (Sweden) SWE | Benny Lekström | 9 | 0 | 9 | 0 | 0 | 0 |
| 2 | DF | (Norway) NOR | Magnar Ødegaard | 32 | 1 | 29+1 | 1 | 2 | 0 |
| 3 | DF | (Norway) NOR | Kent-Are Antonsen | 30 | 3 | 27+1 | 3 | 0+2 | 0 |
| 4 | DF | (Norway) NOR | Henrik Gjesdal | 8 | 0 | 2+4 | 0 | 2 | 0 |
| 5 | FW | (Norway) NOR | Morten Moldskred | 27 | 1 | 17+8 | 1 | 2 | 0 |
| 6 | MF | (Norway) NOR | Christian Landu Landu | 20 | 0 | 20 | 0 | 0 | 0 |
| 7 | MF | (Sweden) SWE | Marcus Hansson | 27 | 1 | 19+6 | 1 | 2 | 0 |
| 8 | MF | (Norway) NOR | Gjermund Åsen | 22 | 3 | 20+1 | 3 | 1 | 0 |
| 11 | DF | (Norway) NOR | Jonas Johansen | 20 | 1 | 8+10 | 1 | 2 | 0 |
| 12 | GK | (Norway) NOR | Gudmund Taksdal Kongshavn | 3 | 0 | 3 | 0 | 0 | 0 |
| 13 | FW | (Czech Republic) CZE | Zdeněk Ondrášek | 29 | 10 | 27 | 9 | 1+1 | 1 |
| 14 | DF | (Norway) NOR | Hans Norbye | 22 | 0 | 19+2 | 0 | 0+1 | 0 |
| 15 | MF | (Norway) NOR | Magnus Andersen | 32 | 7 | 30 | 7 | 2 | 0 |
| 16 | MF | (Norway) NOR | Lars Gunnar Johnsen | 1 | 0 | 1 | 0 | 0 | 0 |
| 17 | MF | (Norway) NOR | Remi Johansen | 27 | 2 | 19+8 | 2 | 0 | 0 |
| 21 | MF | (Norway) NOR | Thomas Kind Bendiksen | 11 | 0 | 9+2 | 0 | 0 | 0 |
| 22 | DF | (Norway) NOR | Simen Wangberg | 28 | 0 | 28 | 0 | 0 | 0 |
| 23 | GK | (Norway) NOR | Pål Vestly Heigre | 23 | 0 | 19+2 | 0 | 2 | 0 |
| 24 | FW | (Norway) NOR | Mikael Ingebrigtsen | 21 | 4 | 11+9 | 3 | 1 | 1 |
| 25 | DF | (Norway) NOR | Lasse Nilsen | 14 | 0 | 5+7 | 0 | 2 | 0 |
| 26 | DF | (Norway) NOR | Jostein Gundersen | 3 | 0 | 0+3 | 0 | 0 | 0 |
| 30 | FW | (Norway) NOR | Runar Espejord | 12 | 4 | 5+6 | 3 | 1 | 1 |
| 48 | MF | (Croatia) CRO | Marin Oršulić | 7 | 0 | 3+4 | 0 | 0 | 0 |
Players away from Tromsø on loan:
Players who appeared for Tromsø no longer at the club:
| 10 | MF | (Norway) NOR | Thomas Drage | 11 | 0 | 2+7 | 0 | 2 | 0 |

=== Goal scorers ===
| Place | Position | Nation | Number | Name | Tippeligaen | Norwegian Cup | Total |
|---|---|---|---|---|---|---|---|
| 1 | FW | (Czech Republic) | 13 | Zdeněk Ondrášek | 9 | 1 | 10 |
| 2 | MF | (Norway) | 15 | Magnus Andersen | 7 | 0 | 7 |
| 3 | FW | (Norway) | 24 | Mikael Ingebrigtsen | 3 | 1 | 4 |
| 3 | FW | (Norway) | 30 | Runar Espejord | 2 | 1 | 4 |
| 5 | MF | (Norway) | 8 | Gjermund Åsen | 3 | 0 | 3 |
| 5 | MF | (Norway) | 17 | Remi Johansen | 3 | 0 | 3 |
| 5 | DF | (Norway) | 3 | Kent-Are Antonsen | 3 | 0 | 3 |
| 8 | MF | (Sweden) | 7 | Marcus Hansson | 1 | 0 | 1 |
| 8 | DF | (Norway) | 11 | Jonas Johansen | 1 | 0 | 1 |
| 8 | FW | (Norway) | 5 | Morten Moldskred | 1 | 0 | 1 |
| 8 | DF | (Norway) | 2 | Magnar Ødegaard | 1 | 0 | 1 |
| 8 | | | | Own goal | 1 | 0 | 1 |
| | | | | TOTALS | 35 | 3 | 38 |

=== Disciplinary record ===
| Number | Nation | Position | Name | Tippeligaen | | Norwegian Cup | | Total | |
| Number | Nation | Position | Name | Yellow card | Red card | Yellow card | Red card | Yellow card | Red card |
| 1 | (Sweden) | GK | Benny Lekström | 1 | 0 | 0 | 0 | 1 | 0 |
| 2 | (Norway) | DF | Magnar Ødegaard | 2 | 0 | 0 | 0 | 2 | 0 |
| 3 | (Norway) | DF | Kent-Are Antonsen | 4 | 0 | 0 | 0 | 4 | 0 |
| 6 | (Norway) | MF | Christian Landu Landu | 4 | 0 | 0 | 0 | 4 | 0 |
| 7 | (Sweden) | MF | Marcus Hansson | 3 | 0 | 0 | 0 | 3 | 0 |
| 8 | (Norway) | MF | Gjermund Åsen | 2 | 0 | 0 | 0 | 2 | 0 |
| 10 | (Norway) | MF | Thomas Drage | 0 | 0 | 1 | 0 | 1 | 0 |
| 11 | (Norway) | DF | Jonas Johansen | 1 | 0 | 0 | 0 | 1 | 0 |
| 13 | (Czech Republic) | FW | Zdeněk Ondrášek | 6 | 0 | 0 | 0 | 6 | 0 |
| 14 | (Norway) | DF | Hans Norbye | 2 | 0 | 0 | 0 | 2 | 0 |
| 15 | (Norway) | MF | Magnus Andersen | 1 | 0 | 0 | 0 | 1 | 0 |
| 17 | (Norway) | MF | Remi Johansen | 3 | 0 | 0 | 0 | 3 | 0 |
| 22 | (Norway) | DF | Simen Wangberg | 5 | 1 | 0 | 0 | 5 | 1 |
| 48 | (Croatia) | MF | Marin Oršulić | 5 | 1 | 0 | 0 | 5 | 1 |
| | | | TOTALS | 39 | 2 | 1 | 0 | 40 | 2 |
