= 2014 Tromsø IL season =

Tromsø
2014 season
- Chairman: Bjørn Nilsen
- Manager: Steinar Nilsen
- Stadium: Alfheim Stadion
- 1. divisjon: 2nd
- Norwegian Cup: Third Round vs Bodø/Glimt
- Europa League: 2nd qualifying round vs Víkingur Gøta
- Top goalscorer: League: Zdeněk Ondrášek (15); All: Magnus Andersen & Zdeněk Ondrášek (15)
Home colours	Away colours

The 2014 season was Tromsø's first in the Norwegian First Division since 2002, following their relegation at the end of the 2013 season.

== Squad ==
Note: Flags indicate national team as defined under FIFA eligibility rules; some limited exceptions apply. Players may hold more than one non-FIFA nationality.

No.	Pos.	Nation	Player
1	GK	SWE	Benny Lekström
3	DF	NOR	Kent-Are Antonsen
4	DF	NOR	Henrik Gjesdal
5	FW	NOR	Morten Moldskred
7	DF	FIN	Miika Koppinen (captain)
8	MF	NOR	Thomas Kind Bendiksen
10	MF	NOR	Thomas Drage
11	MF	NOR	Jonas Johansen
13	FW	CZE	Zdeněk Ondrášek
14	DF	NOR	Hans Norbye
15	MF	NOR	Magnus Andersen
16	MF	NOR	Lars Gunnar Johnsen

No.	Pos.	Nation	Player
17	MF	NOR	Remi Johansen
19	MF	NOR	William Frantzen
20	DF	NOR	Mathias Johnsen
22	DF	NOR	Simen Wangberg
24	FW	NOR	Mikael Ingebrigtsen
25	DF	NOR	Lasse Nilsen
26	DF	NOR	Jostein Gundersen
27	GK	NOR	Lars Herlofsen
29	MF	NOR	Elias Skogvoll
30	FW	NOR	Runar Espejord
41	MF	NOR	Lars Henrik Andreassen

== Transfers ==
=== Winter ===
In: Note: Flags indicate national team as defined under FIFA eligibility rules; some limited exceptions apply. Players may hold more than one non-FIFA nationality.

No.	Pos.	Nation	Player
11	MF	NOR	Jonas Johansen (from (Norway) Tromsdalen)
22	DF	NOR	Simen Wangberg (from (Norway) Brann)
27	GK	NOR	Lars Herlofsen (from (Norway) Ørn-Horten)
41	MF	NOR	Lars Henrik Andreassen (from (Norway) Finnsnes)

Out: Note: Flags indicate national team as defined under FIFA eligibility rules; some limited exceptions apply. Players may hold more than one non-FIFA nationality.

No.	Pos.	Nation	Player
1	GK	SWE	Marcus Sahlman (to (Sweden) Norrköping)
4	DF	NOR	Ruben Kristiansen (to (Norway) Vålerenga)
6	DF	NOR	Adnan Čaušević (to (Norway) Bryne)
9	FW	NOR	Steffen Nystrøm (to (Norway) Fredrikstad)
18	MF	WAL	Josh Pritchard (loan return to (England) Fulham)
28	MF	GER	Hendrik Helmke (to (Finland) Jaro)

=== Summer ===
In: Note: Flags indicate national team as defined under FIFA eligibility rules; some limited exceptions apply. Players may hold more than one non-FIFA nationality.

No.	Pos.	Nation	Player
4	DF	NOR	Henrik Gjesdal (from (Norway) Brann)

Out: Note: Flags indicate national team as defined under FIFA eligibility rules; some limited exceptions apply. Players may hold more than one non-FIFA nationality.

No.	Pos.	Nation	Player
23	DF	POL	Jarosław Fojut (to (Scotland) Dundee United)

== Competitions ==
=== 1. divisjon ===
==== Results summary ====
Overall								Home						Away					
Pld	W	D	L	GF	GA	GD	Pts	W	D	L	GF	GA	GD	W	D	L	GF	GA	GD
30	18	5	7	67	27	+40	59	10	4	1	39	12	+27	8	1	6	28	15	+13

Last updated: 2 November 2014.
Source: see below

==== Results by round ====
Round	1	2	3	4	5	6	7	8	9	10	11	12	13	14	15	16	17	18	19	20	21	22	23	24	25	26	27	28	29	30
Ground	A	H	A	H	A	H	A	H	A	H	H	A	H	A	H	A	H	A	H	A	H	H	A	H	A	H	A	A	H	A
Result	W	W	W	W	D	D	L	W	W	D	W	W	D	W	L	L	W	W	W	L	W	D	W	W	L	W	L	L	W	W
Position	3	2	1	1	1	1	4	3	2	2	2	2	2	1	2	2	2	1	1	2	2	2	2	2	2	2	2	2	2	2

Source: see below
A = Away; H = Home; W = Win; D = Draw; L = Loss

==== Results ====
6 April 2014 1	Fredrikstad	0–2	Tromsø	Fredrikstad
15:00 CEST (UTC+2)	Åsheim (yellow card) 69'	Report	Ondrášek 45'; Moldskred (yellow card) 72'; Andersen 82'; Norbye (yellow card) 85'	Stadium: Fredrikstad Stadion; Attendance: 5,005; Referee: Espen Eskås

13 April 2014 2	Tromsø	1–0	Alta	Tromsø
15:00 CEST (UTC+2)	Ondrášek 90+6' (yellow card) 90+6'	Report		Stadium: Alfheim Stadion; Attendance: 2,810; Referee: Kjetil Hansen

21 April 2014 3	Hønefoss	1–3	Tromsø	Hønefoss
15:00 CEST (UTC+2)	Riski 30'; Solli (yellow card) 45'; Qaka (yellow card) 74'	Report	Johansen 18'; Bendiksen 32' (pen.); Moldskred (yellow card) 42'; Ondrášek 51'	Stadium: Aka Arena; Attendance: 1,609; Referee: Bjorn Hansen

27 April 2014 4	Tromsø	1–0	HamKam	Tromsø
15:00 CEST (UTC+2)	Fojut (yellow card) 71'; Ondrášek 80'	Report	Aalmen (yellow card) 83'; Júlíusson (yellow card) 87'	Stadium: Alfheim Stadion; Attendance: 2,452; Referee: Ole Gya

1 May 2014 5	Tromsdalen	0–0	Tromsø	Tromsø
15:00 CEST (UTC+2)	Lysvoll (yellow card) 34'; Bertheussen (yellow card) 52'	Report	Drage (yellow card) 5'; Johansen (yellow card) 55'	Stadium: Tromsdalen Stadion; Attendance: 1,960; Referee: Jan Morten Tennøy

4 May 2014 6	Tromsø	1–1	Ranheim	Tromsø
15:00 CEST (UTC+2)	Johansen 20' (yellow card) 87'	Report	Åsen 18'; Løkberg (yellow card) 90+4'	Stadium: Alfheim Stadion; Attendance: 2,378; Referee: Andres Gjermshus

11 May 2014 7	Nest-Sotra	2–1	Tromsø	Ågotnes
15:00 CEST (UTC+2)	Gjesdal 43'; Næss 53'	Report	Moldskred 38'	Stadium: Ågotnes Stadion; Attendance: 964; Referee: Kim Rune Borgersen

16 May 2014 8	Tromsø	5–2	Bærum	Tromsø
18:00 CEST (UTC+2)	Moldskred 9'; Norbye 25'; R. Johansen 46', 71'; Andersen 67'	Report	Tollås 45+1'; Berg 75'	Stadium: Alfheim Stadion; Attendance: 2,863; Referee: Kristoffer Helgerud

19 May 2014 9	Strømmen	0–3	Tromsø	Strømmen
20:00 CEST (UTC+2)		Report	Moldskred 39'; R. Johansen 46'; Bendiksen 69'	Stadium: Strømmen Stadion; Attendance: 529; Referee: Kristoffer Hagenes

26 May 2014 10	Tromsø	1–1	Mjøndalen	Tromsø
19:00 CEST (UTC+2)	Ondrášek 10'	Report	Strange 29'	Stadium: Alfheim Stadion; Attendance: 2,551; Referee: Espen Eskås

29 May 2014 11	Tromsø	3–1	Kristiansund	Tromsø
18:00 CEST (UTC+2)	Andersen 10'; Ondrášek 19'; Moldskred 49'	Report	Tomren 15'	Stadium: Alfheim Stadion; Attendance: 2,617; Referee: Omar Rafiq

1 June 2014 12	Hødd	0–2	Tromsø	Ulsteinvik
18:00 CEST (UTC+2)		Report	R. Johansen 35'; Andersen 56'	Stadium: Høddvoll Stadion; Attendance: 1,602; Referee: Steinar Hauge

9 June 2014 13	Tromsø	0–0	Sandefjord	Tromsø
20:00 CEST (UTC+2)		Report		Stadium: Alfheim Stadion; Attendance: 2,750; Referee: Ole Gya

12 June 2014 15	Tromsø	2–3	Bryne	Tromsø
17:30 CEST (UTC+2)	J. Johansen 35', 58'	Report	Khattab 24'; Wangberg 50' (o.g.); Khalili 88'	Stadium: Alfheim Stadion; Attendance: 2,337; Referee: Kai Erik Steen

15 June 2014 14	Ull/Kisa	1–3	Tromsø	Jessheim
15:00 CEST (UTC+2)	Kwakwa 86'	Report	R. Johansen 6'; J. Johansen 26', 66'	Stadium: Jessheim Stadion; Attendance: 933; Referee: Sigurd Kringstad

27 July 2014 17	Tromsø	4–0	Strømmen	Tromsø
18:00 CEST (UTC+2)	R. Johansen 17', 26'; Andersen 68'; J. Johansen 90+1'	Report		Stadium: Alfheim Stadion; Attendance: 2,470; Referee: Kjetil Hansen

3 August 2014 18	Ranheim	0–3	Tromsø	Trondheim
19:00 CEST (UTC+2)		Report	Drage 39'; R. Johansen 49'; Moldskred 78'	Stadium: DnB Arena; Attendance: 1,067; Referee: Anders Gjermshus

10 August 2014 19	Tromsø	5–1	Tromsdalen	Tromsø
15:00 CEST (UTC+2)	Bendiksen 8' (pen.), 63'; Gjesdal 36'; J. Johansen 45+1'; Andersen 64'	Report	Råde 30'	Stadium: Alfheim Stadion; Attendance: 3,497; Referee: Sigurd Kringstad

14 August 2014 20	Bærum	2–1	Tromsø	Bærum
18:00 CEST (UTC+2)	Aalbu 32', 60'	Report	J. Johansen 78'	Stadium: Sandvika Stadion; Attendance: 1,014; Referee: Per Erik Haugen

18 August 2014 21	Tromsø	4–2	Nest-Sotra	Tromsø
19:00 CEST (UTC+2)	Drage 45+2'; Ondrášek 45+5', 90+4'; R. Johansen 50'	Report	Hopen 17'; Næss 72'	Stadium: Alfheim Stadion; Attendance: 2,446; Referee: Mads Ahlsen

25 August 2014 22	Tromsø	1–1	Hønefoss	Tromsø
19:00 CEST (UTC+2)	Ondrášek 74'	Report	Seck 40'	Stadium: Alfheim Stadion; Attendance: 2,742; Referee: Christian Moen

31 August 2014 23	Alta	0–3	Tromsø	Alta
18:00 CEST (UTC+2)		Report	Ondrášek 32'; Wangberg 35'; Moldskred 38'	Stadium: Finnmarkshallen; Attendance: 961; Referee: Steinar Hauge

5 September 2014 16	Mjøndalen	2–1	Tromsø	Mjøndalen
19:00 CEST (UTC+2)	Diomande 2'; Sylling Olsen 33'	Report	Andersen 90+2'	Stadium: Mjøndalen Stadion; Attendance: 1,507; Referee: Anders Gjermshus

15 September 2014 24	Tromsø	5–0	Hødd	Tromsø
19:00 CEST (UTC+2)	Andersen 16', 69'; Norbye 45+1'; R. Johansen 66'; Moldskred 70'	Report		Stadium: Alfheim Stadion; Attendance: 2,638; Referee: Per Erik Haugen

21 September 2014 25	Kristiansund	1–0	Tromsø	Kristiansund
15:00 CEST (UTC+2)	Torske 80'	Report		Stadium: Kristiansund Stadion; Attendance: 1,555; Referee: Ole Gya

28 September 2014 26	Tromsø	5–0	Ull/Kisa	Tromsø
18:00 CEST (UTC+2)	Andersen 32', 74'; Ondrášek 33', 53', 72' (pen.)	Report		Stadium: Alfheim Stadion; Attendance: 2,604; Referee: Jan Morten Tennøy

6 October 2014 27	Bryne	2–1	Tromsø	Bryne
19:00 CEST (UTC+2)	Johansen 22'; Vevatne 57'	Report	Ondrášek 19'	Stadium: Bryne Stadion; Attendance: 1,277; Referee: Mads Ahlsen

20 October 2014 28	Sandefjord	3–1	Tromsø	Sandefjord
19:00 CEST (UTC+2)	Strand 11'; Sellin 58'; Kirkevold 71'	Report	J. Johansen 45+2'	Stadium: Komplett.no Arena; Attendance: 3,198; Referee: Kai Erik Steen

26 October 2014 29	Tromsø	1–0	Fredrikstad	Tromsø
13:00 CET (UTC+1)	J. Johansen 23'	Report		Stadium: Alfheim Stadion; Attendance: 4,414; Referee: Anders Gjermshus

2 November 2014 30	HamKam	1–4	Tromsø	Hamar
12:00 CET (UTC+1)	Hassan 12'	Report	Wangberg 44'; Andersen 51'; Mambouana 56' (o.g.); Ondrášek 76'	Stadium: Briskeby Stadion; Attendance: 898; Referee: Christian Moen

==== Table ====
Pos	Team	Pld	W	D	L	GF	GA	GD	Pts	Promotion, qualification or relegation
1	Sandefjord (C, P)	30	20	9	1	62	24	+38	69	Promotion to Tippeligaen
2	Tromsø (P)	30	18	5	7	67	27	+40	59	Promotion to Tippeligaen
3	Mjøndalen (O, P)	30	14	9	7	57	36	+21	51	Qualification for the promotion play-offs
4	Kristiansund BK	30	13	10	7	53	39	+14	49	Qualification for the promotion play-offs
5	Bærum	30	15	4	11	51	52	−1	49	Qualification for the promotion play-offs

Source: nifs.no
Rules for classification: 1) points; 2) goal difference; 3) number of goals scored.
(C) Champions; (O) Play-off winners; (P) Promoted

=== Norwegian Cup ===
24 April 2014 First Round	Mjølner	0–0 (a.e.t.) (7–8 p)	Tromsø	Narvik
18:00 CEST (UTC+2)	T. A. Hansen (yellow card) 60'; Schmiel (yellow card) 76' (yellow-red card) 116'	Report	Frantzen (yellow card) 6' (yellow-red card) 45'	Stadium: Narvik Stadium; Attendance: 648; Referee: Marius Jespersen
	Penalties
	Nerbø (penalty scored); Henriksen (penalty scored); Fjellbakk (penalty scored); Mathisen (penalty scored); Schjelderup (penalty scored); Soleng (penalty scored); Juma (penalty scored); T. A. Hansen (penalty missed)		(penalty scored) Bendiksen; (penalty scored) J.Johansen; (penalty scored) Drage; (penalty scored) Antonsen; (penalty scored) Wangberg; (penalty scored) Norbye; (penalty scored) Ingebrigtsen; (penalty scored) Espejord

7 May 2014 Second Round	Finnsnes	2–2 (a.e.t.) (2–4 p)	Tromsø	Finnsnes
18:00 CEST (UTC+2)	Andreassen 22'; Samuelsen (yellow card) 33'; Simonsen 52' (pen.); Aloyseous (yellow card) 68'; Sletten (yellow card) 72'	Report	Bendiksen 4' (pen.), 55' (pen.); Johnsen (yellow card) 51'; Ingebrigtsen (yellow card) 75'; J. Johansen (yellow card) 113'	Stadium: Finnsnes Stadium; Attendance: 545; Referee: Vegar Ballovarre
	Penalties
	Andreassen (penalty missed); M. Olsen (penalty missed); Simonsen (penalty scored); Schjetne (penalty scored)		(penalty scored) Bendiksen; (penalty scored) J. Johansen; (penalty missed) Johnsen; (penalty scored) Ingebrigtsen; (penalty scored) Moldskred

5 June 2014 Third Round	Tromsø	1–2	Bodø/Glimt	Tromsø
18:00 CEST (UTC+2)	Espejord 15'; R. Johansen (yellow card) 36'	Report	Laajab (yellow card) 11'; Jacobsen (yellow card) 40'; T. Olsen 45' (yellow card) 72'; Sané 64'	Stadium: Alfheim Stadion; Attendance: 3,530; Referee: Espen Berntsen

=== Europa League ===
==== Qualifying phase ====
3 July 2014 1st qualifying round 1st leg	Santos Tartu (Estonia)	0–7	(Norway) Tromsø	Tartu, Estonia
17:00 CEST (UTC+2)		Report	Andersen 14', 44'; J. Johansen 22'; Moldskred 24'; Drage 56'; Norbye 75'; L. Johnsen 79'	Stadium: Tamme Stadium; Attendance: 1,169; Referee: Michael Lerjéus (Sweden)

10 July 2014 1st qualifying round 2nd leg	Tromsø (Norway)	6–1 (13–1 agg.)	(Estonia) Santos Tartu	Tromsø, Norway
19:00 CEST (UTC+2)	Espejord 13'; Drage 23'; Andersen 28', 57'; Wangberg 54', 79'	Report	Alve 39'	Stadium: Alfheim Stadion; Attendance: 760; Referee: Richard Trutz (Slovakia)

17 July 2014 2nd qualifying round 1st leg	Víkingur Gøta (Faroe Islands)	0–0	(Norway) Tromsø	Toftir, Faroe Islands
20:00 CEST (UTC+2)		Report		Stadium: Svangaskarð; Attendance: 447; Referee: Radu Petrescu (Romania)

24 July 2014 2nd qualifying round 2nd leg	Tromsø (Norway)	1–2 (1–2 agg.)	(Faroe Islands) Víkingur Gøta	Tromsø, Norway
19:00 CEST (UTC+2)	Wangberg 51'	Report	B. Hansen 60'; Hansson 77'	Stadium: Alfheim Stadion; Attendance: 1,281; Referee: Gunnar Jarl Jónsson (Iceland)

== Squad statistics ==
As of match played 8 November 2015

=== Appearances and goals ===
No.	Pos	Nat	Player	Total		Tippeligaen		Norwegian Cup		UEFA Europa League	
No.	Pos	Nat	Player	Apps	Goals	Apps	Goals	Apps	Goals	Apps	Goals
1	GK	(Sweden) SWE	Benny Lekström	1	0	0	0	1	0	0	0
3	DF	(Norway) NOR	Kent-Are Antonsen	2	0	0	0	1+1	0	0	0
5	FW	(Norway) NOR	Morten Moldskred	2	0	0	0	2	0	0	0
8	MF	(Norway) NOR	Thomas Kind Bendiksen	3	2	0	0	2+1	2	0	0
10	MF	(Norway) NOR	Thomas Drage	3	0	0	0	3	0	0	0
11	MF	(Norway) NOR	Jonas Johansen	3	0	0	0	3	0	0	0
13	FW	(Czech Republic) CZE	Zdeněk Ondrášek	1	0	0	0	0+1	0	0	0
14	DF	(Norway) NOR	Hans Norbye	2	0	0	0	1+1	0	0	0
15	MF	(Norway) NOR	Magnus Andersen	1	0	0	0	0+1	0	0	0
16	MF	(Norway) NOR	Lars Gunnar Johnsen	3	0	0	0	2+1	0	0	0
17	MF	(Norway) NOR	Remi Johansen	2	0	0	0	2	0	0	0
19	MF	(Norway) NOR	William Frantzen	2	0	0	0	2	0	0	0
22	DF	(Norway) NOR	Simen Wangberg	3	0	0	0	2+1	0	0	0
24	FW	(Norway) NOR	Mikael Ingebrigtsen	3	0	0	0	2+1	0	0	0
25	DF	(Norway) NOR	Lasse Nilsen	3	0	0	0	2+1	0	0	0
27	GK	(Norway) NOR	Lars Herlofsen	2	0	0	0	2	0	0	0
29	MF	(Norway) NOR	Elias Skogvoll	1	0	0	0	1	0	0	0
30	FW	(Norway) NOR	Runar Espejord	3	1	0	0	3	1	0	0
41	MF	(Norway) NOR	Lars Henrik Andreassen	1	0	0	0	1	0	0	0
Players away from Tromsø on loan:
Players who left Tromsø during the season:
23	DF	(Poland) POL	Jarosław Fojut	1	0	0	0	1	0	0	0

=== Goal scorers ===
Place	Position	Nation	Number	Name	Tippeligaen	Norwegian Cup	UEFA Europa League	Total
1	MF	(Norway)	8	Thomas Kind Bendiksen	0	2	0	2
2	FW	(Norway)	30	Runar Espejord	0	1	0	1
				TOTALS	0	3	0	3

=== Disciplinary record ===
Number	Nation	Position	Name	Tippeligaen		Norwegian Cup		UEFA Europa League		Total	
Number	Nation	Position	Name	Yellow card	Red card	Yellow card	Red card	Yellow card	Red card	Yellow card	Red card
11	(Norway)	MF	Jonas Johansen	0	0	1	0	0	0	1	0
16	(Norway)	MF	Lars Gunnar Johnsen	0	0	1	0	0	0	1	0
17	(Norway)	MF	Remi Johansen	0	0	1	0	0	0	1	0
19	(Norway)	MF	William Frantzen	0	0	2	1	0	0	2	1
24	(Norway)	FW	Mikael Ingebrigtsen	0	0	1	0	0	0	1	0
			TOTALS	0	0	6	1	0	0	6	1
