= 2017 Tromsø IL season =

Tromsø
2017 season
- Chairman: Bjørn Nilsen
- Manager: Simo Valakari
- Stadium: Alfheim Stadion
- Tippeligaen: 11th
- Norwegian Cup: Fourth Round vs Lillestrøm
- Top goalscorer: League: Thomas Lehne Olsen (11); All: Thomas Lehne Olsen (12)
Home colours	Away colours

The 2017 season is Tromsø's third season back in the Tippeligaen following their relegation in 2013, their 30th season in the top flight of Norwegian football and their second season with Bård Flovik as their manager.

== Squad ==
As of 14 September 2017

Note: Flags indicate national team as defined under FIFA eligibility rules; some limited exceptions apply. Players may hold more than one non-FIFA nationality.

No.	Pos.	Nation	Player
1	GK	NOR	Gudmund Taksdal Kongshavn
3	DF	NOR	Kent-Are Antonsen
4	DF	SEN	Mehdi Dioury
5	DF	NOR	Magnar Ødegaard
6	MF	NOR	Christian Landu Landu
7	MF	NOR	Morten Gamst Pedersen
8	MF	NOR	Ulrik Jenssen
9	FW	SLO	Slobodan Vuk
10	FW	NOR	Thomas Lehne Olsen
11	MF	NOR	Jonas Johansen
12	GK	CRO	Filip Lončarić
14	DF	NOR	Hans Norbye
15	MF	NOR	Magnus Andersen
17	MF	ISL	Aron Sigurðarson

No.	Pos.	Nation	Player
18	FW	SEN	Elhadji Mour Samb
19	DF	NOR	William Frantzen
20	MF	NOR	Peter Aas
21	GK	FIN	Otto Fredrikson
22	DF	NOR	Simen Wangberg
23	MF	NOR	Gjermund Åsen
24	FW	NOR	Mikael Ingebrigtsen
25	DF	NOR	Lasse Nilsen
26	DF	NOR	Jostein Gundersen
28	GK	NOR	Jacob Karlstrom
30	FW	NOR	Runar Espejord
40	GK	ESP	Javier Jiménez
42	FW	NOR	Mushaga Bakenga
88	MF	RUS	Shamil Gasanov

=== Out on loan ===
Note: Flags indicate national team as defined under FIFA eligibility rules; some limited exceptions apply. Players may hold more than one non-FIFA nationality.

No.	Pos.	Nation	Player
27	FW	NOR	Fredrik Michalsen (at Fjölnir)

== Transfers ==
=== Winter ===
In: Note: Flags indicate national team as defined under FIFA eligibility rules; some limited exceptions apply. Players may hold more than one non-FIFA nationality.

No.	Pos.	Nation	Player
4	DF	SEN	Mehdi Dioury (from (Senegal) Diambars)
9	FW	SLO	Slobodan Vuk (from (Slovenia) Domžale)
16	DF	GHA	Patrick Kpozo (loan from (Sweden) AIK)
18	MF	SEN	Elhadji Mour Samb (from (Senegal) Diambars)

Out: Note: Flags indicate national team as defined under FIFA eligibility rules; some limited exceptions apply. Players may hold more than one non-FIFA nationality.

No.	Pos.	Nation	Player
4	DF	NOR	Henrik Gjesdal (to (Norway) Kristiansund)
9	FW	TUN	Sofien Moussa (to (Bulgaria) Lokomotiv GO)
20	FW	NOR	Christer Johnsgård (to (Norway) Tromsdalen)
25	DF	NOR	Lasse Nilsen (on loan to (Norway) Tromsdalen)

=== Summer ===
In: Note: Flags indicate national team as defined under FIFA eligibility rules; some limited exceptions apply. Players may hold more than one non-FIFA nationality.

No.	Pos.	Nation	Player
21	GK	FIN	Otto Fredrikson (from (Norway) Kongsvinger)
25	DF	NOR	Lasse Nilsen (loan return from (Norway) Tromsdalen)
40	GK	ESP	Javier Jiménez Camarero (from (Spain) Huesca)
42	FW	NOR	Mushaga Bakenga (from (Norway) Rosenborg)
88	MF	RUS	Shamil Gasanov (from (Russia) Anzhi Makhachkala)

Out: Note: Flags indicate national team as defined under FIFA eligibility rules; some limited exceptions apply. Players may hold more than one non-FIFA nationality.

No.	Pos.	Nation	Player
16	DF	GHA	Patrick Kpozo (loan return to (Sweden) AIK)
27	MF	NOR	Fredrik Michalsen (on loan to (Iceland) Fjölnir)

== Competitions ==
=== Tippeligaen ===
==== Results summary ====
Overall								Home						Away					
Pld	W	D	L	GF	GA	GD	Pts	W	D	L	GF	GA	GD	W	D	L	GF	GA	GD
30	10	8	12	42	49	−7	38	6	5	4	27	21	+6	4	3	8	15	28	−13

Last updated: 26 November 2017.
Source: see below

==== Results by round ====
Round	1	2	3	4	5	6	7	8	9	10	11	12	13	14	15	16	17	18	19	20	21	22	23	24	25	26	27	28	29	30
Ground	H	A	H	A	H	A	H	A	A	H	A	H	A	H	A	A	H	A	H	A	H	H	A	H	H	A	H	A	H	A
Result	D	W	W	L	L	L	D	D	W	D	L	L	L	D	L	L	L	D	W	L	W	D	L	W	L	W	W	W	W	D
Position	9	5	3	6	7	11	11	11	9	8	11	14	15	15	15	15	16	16	15	15	15	15	15	15	15	14	13	13	11	11

Updated to match(es) played on 26 November 2017. Source: see below
A = Away; H = Home; W = Win; D = Draw; L = Loss

==== Results ====
2 April 2017 1	Tromsø	1–1	Brann	Tromsø
18:00 CEST (UTC+2)	Pedersen (yellow card) 52'; Ødegaard (yellow card) 83'; Ødegaard 90'	Report	Orlov 46'; Grønner (yellow card) 49'; Acosta (yellow card) 90+3'	Stadium: Alfheim Stadion; Attendance: 3,264; Referee: Trond Ivar Døvle

6 April 2017 2	Viking	1–2	Tromsø	Stavanger
19:00 CEST (UTC+2)	Ernemann (yellow card) 56'; Ryerson 58'; Haugen (yellow card) 79'	Report	Ledger 6' (o.g.); Gundersen (yellow card) 21'; Landu-Landu (yellow card) 79'; Åsen 90'	Stadium: Viking Stadion; Attendance: 6,321; Referee: Kristoffer Hagenes

9 April 2017 3	Tromsø	3–0	Sogndal	Tromsø
18:00 CEST (UTC+2)	Åsen 46'; Wangberg 53'; Norbye 90+3'	Report	Grodås (yellow card) 32'	Stadium: Alfheim Stadion; Attendance: 3,082; Referee: Trygve Kjensli

17 April 2017 4	Odd	1–0	Tromsø	Skien
20:00 CEST (UTC+2)	Riski 6'; Berge (yellow card) 18'; Zekhnini (red card) 88'	Report		Stadium: Skagerak Arena; Attendance: 6,272; Referee: Svein Oddvar Moen

23 April 2017 5	Tromsø	0–3	Stabæk	Tromsø
18:00 CEST (UTC+2)	Jenssen (yellow card) 88'; Andersen (yellow card) 90+3'	Report	Omoijuanfo 5'; Vetlesen (yellow card) 33'; Brochmann 39', 42'; Hanche-Olsen (yellow card) 85'	Stadium: Alfheim Stadion; Attendance: 3,447; Referee: Rohit Saggi

30 April 2017 6	Aalesund	3–1	Tromsø	Ålesund
18:00 CEST (UTC+2)	Abdellaoue (yellow card) 18' (goal) 67'; Riise 61'; Hoff 80'	Report	Åsen (yellow card) 19'; Ingebrigtsen 21' (yellow card) 29'; Kpozo (yellow card) 47'	Stadium: Color Line Stadion; Attendance: 5,562; Referee: Kristoffer Hagenes

7 May 2017 7	Tromsø	1–1	Kristiansund	Tromsø
18:00 CEST (UTC+2)	Olsen 10'	Report	Stokke 39'	Stadium: Alfheim Stadion; Attendance: 3,068; Referee: Dag Vidar Hafsås

13 May 2017 8	Sarpsborg 08	1–1	Tromsø	Sarpsborg
18:00 CEST (UTC+2)	Halvorsen (yellow card) 16'; Albech (yellow card) 19' (yellow-red card) 88'; Fejzullahu 72'	Report	Olsen (yellow card) 45' (goal) 48'	Stadium: Sarpsborg Stadion; Attendance: 4,395; Referee: Rohit Saggi

16 May 2017 9	Rosenborg	1–2	Tromsø	Trondheim
20:00 CEST (UTC+2)	Vilhjálmsson 20'; Helland (yellow card) 41'; Hedenstad (yellow card) 52'; Rashani (yellow card) 90'	Report	Åsen (yellow card) 8'; Ingebrigtsen 43'; Sigurðarson 85'; Pedersen (yellow card) 90'	Stadium: Lerkendal Stadion; Attendance: 21,112; Referee: Kai Erik Steen

21 May 2017 10	Tromsø	1–1	Strømsgodset	Tromsø
18:00 CEST (UTC+2)	Jenssen 31'; Norbye (yellow card) 79'	Report	Tokstad 58'; Hauger (yellow card) 83'	Stadium: Alfheim Stadion; Referee: Martin Lundby

28 May 2017 11	Lillestrøm	4–1	Tromsø	Lillestrøm
18:00 CEST (UTC+2)	Udoji 9'; Kippe (yellow card) 51'; Knudtzon 54', 73', 77'; Andreassen (yellow card) 76'; Ajeti (yellow card) 90+2'	Report	Ingebrigtsen 1'; Åsen (yellow card) 36'; Wangberg (yellow card) 50'; Antonsen (red card) 62'	Stadium: Åråsen Stadion; Attendance: 5,468; Referee: Rohit Saggi

3 June 2017 12	Tromsø	2–4	Vålerenga	Tromsø
15:30 CEST (UTC+2)	Sigurðarson 62'; Ingebrigtsen 75'; Jenssen (yellow card) 83'	Report	Tollås 7'; Zahid 16' (yellow card) 87'; Finne 18'; Abdellaoue 25'; Lundström (yellow card) 34'; Lekven (yellow card) 52'	Stadium: Alfheim Stadion; Attendance: 3,539; Referee: Tom Harald Hagen

18 June 2017 13	Molde	3–0	Tromsø	Molde
18:00 CEST (UTC+2)	Hussain 55'; Sigurðarson 57'; Aursnes (yellow card) 81'; Brustad 83'	Report	Wangberg (yellow card) 70'	Stadium: Aker Stadion; Referee: Ola Hobber Nilsen

25 June 2017 14	Tromsø	1–1	Sandefjord	Tromsø
18:00 CEST (UTC+2)	Sigurðarson 32'; T.Olsen (yellow card) 53'	Report	Morer 1' (yellow card) 53'; Kastrati (yellow card) 12'; J.Olsen (yellow card) 64'; Bindia (yellow card) 83'; Vallès (yellow card) 90+3'	Stadium: Alfheim Stadion; Attendance: 3,555; Referee: Kai Erik Steen

2 July 2017 15	Haugesund	2–0	Tromsø	Haugesund
18:00 CEST (UTC+2)	Kiss 17' (pen.) (yellow card) 21'; Leite (yellow card) 51'; Abdi 83'	Report	Pedersen (yellow card) 17' (yellow-red card) 74'; Gundersen (yellow card) 18'	Stadium: Haugesund Stadion; Attendance: 4,077; Referee: Kristoffer Hagenes

9 July 2017 16	Tromsø	v	Odd	Tromsø
18:00 CEST (UTC+2)				Stadium: Alfheim Stadion

16 July 2017 17	Sandefjord	3–0	Tromsø	Sandefjord
18:00 CEST (UTC+2)	Mjelde 1'; Olsen 5'; Seck (yellow card) 20'; Lorentzen 69'	Report	Jenssen (yellow card) 5'; Sigurðarson (yellow card) 67'; Michalsen (yellow card) 85'	Stadium: Komplett Arena; Attendance: 3,446; Referee: Svein Oddvar Moen

6 August 2017 18	Tromsø	1–2	Molde	Tromsø
18:00 CEST (UTC+2)	Olsen 25'	Report	S.Svendsen 27'; Haaland 77'; Strand (yellow card) 90+2'	Stadium: Alfheim Stadion; Attendance: 3,812; Referee: Trond Ivar Døvle

14 August 2017 19	Vålerenga	0–0	Tromsø	Oslo
19:00 CEST (UTC+2)		Report	Landu Landu (yellow card) 42'	Stadium: Ullevaal Stadion; Attendance: 10,049; Referee: Tom Harald Hagen

20 August 2017 20	Tromsø	3–2	Aalesund	Tromsø
18:00 CEST (UTC+2)	Åsen 6'; Landu Landu (yellow card) 39'; Wangberg (yellow card) 45+1'; Olsen 48', 75'; Nilsen (yellow card) 90+4'	Report	Papazoglou 20'; Kirkeskov (yellow card) 26' (yellow-red card) 63'; Ramsteijn (yellow card) 35'; Riise (yellow card) 53'; Þrándarson 54'; Grétarsson (yellow card) 90+5'	Stadium: Alfheim Stadion; Attendance: 3,938; Referee: Kai Erik Steen

10 September 2017 21	Kristiansund	4–1	Tromsø	Kristiansund
18:00 CEST (UTC+2)	Stokke 8', 45'; Mendy 36'; Gjertsen 48'; Kalludra (yellow card) 60'	Report	Ingebrigtsen 90+2'	Stadium: Atlanten Stadion; Attendance: 3,751; Referee: Tom Harald Hagen

17 September 2017 22	Tromsø	5–0	Sarpsborg 08	Tromsø
18:00 CEST (UTC+2)	Wangberg 13', 41'; Landu Landu 16'; Bakenga 26'; Ingebrigtsen 59'; Ødegaard (yellow card) 90+2'	Report	Albech (yellow card) 80'; Hovda (yellow card) 87'	Stadium: Alfheim Stadion; Attendance: 3,116; Referee: Dag Vidar Hafsås

21 September 2017 16	Tromsø	2–2	Odd	Tromsø
18:00 CEST (UTC+2)	Bakenga 29' (yellow card) 65'; Wangberg 60'; Antonsen (yellow card) 76'	Report	Berge 32'; Broberg (yellow card) 81'; Hussain 87' (pen.)	Stadium: Alfheim Stadion; Referee: Trygve Kjensli

24 September 2017 23	Strømsgodset	2–1	Tromsø	Drammen
18:00 CEST (UTC+2)	Jradi 1'; Pedersen (yellow card) 35'; Høibråten (yellow card) 42'; Nguen 60'	Report	Ingebrigtsen 51'	Stadium: Marienlyst Stadion; Attendance: 5,700; Referee: Svein Oddvar Moen

1 October 2017 24	Tromsø	2–1	Lillestrøm	Tromsø
18:00 CEST (UTC+2)	Ødegaard 1'; Olsen 17'; Ingebrigtsen (yellow card) 23'	Report	Mikalsen 56'; Melgalvis (yellow card) 61'	Stadium: Alfheim Stadion; Attendance: 3,594; Referee: Tom Harald Hagen

14 October 2017 25	Tromsø	0–3	Rosenborg	Tromsø
15:30 CEST (UTC+2)	Ødegaard (yellow card) 65'	Report	Adegbenro 5'; Bendtner 51'; Helland 56'	Stadium: Alfheim Stadion; Attendance: 5,445; Referee: Tore Hansen

22 October 2017 26	Stabæk	1–2	Tromsø	Bærum
18:00 CEST (UTC+2)	Boli 48'; Hanche-Olsen (yellow card) 51' (yellow-red card) 79'	Report	Gundersen 23'; Bakenga 34'; Landu (yellow card) 63'; Nilsen (yellow card) 65'	Stadium: Nadderud Stadion; Attendance: 3,403; Referee: Svein Oddvar Moen

29 October 2017 27	Tromsø	3–0	Viking	Tromsø
18:00 CET (UTC+1)	Wangberg 30'; Lehne Olsen 43', 73'	Report	Martinsen (yellow card) 42' (yellow-red card) 77'; Green (yellow card) 68'; Wichne (yellow card) 72'	Stadium: Alfheim Stadion; Attendance: 3,464; Referee: Rohit Saggi

5 November 2017 28	Sogndal	0–2	Tromsø	Sogndalsfjøra
18:00 CET (UTC+1)		Report	Olsen 38'; Ingebrigtsen 66'; Samb (yellow card) 89'	Stadium: Fosshaugane Campus; Attendance: 3,675; Referee: Tore Hansen

19 November 2017 29	Tromsø	2–0	Haugesund	Tromsø
18:00 CET (UTC+1)	Olsen 21'; Pedersen 47'	Report	Knudsen (yellow card) 26'; Serafin (yellow card) 62'	Stadium: Alfheim Stadion; Attendance: 3,863; Referee: Trygve Kjensli

26 November 2017 30	Brann	2–2	Tromsø	Bergen
18:00 CET (UTC+1)	Marengo 2'; Larsen 56'; Grønner (yellow card) 80'	Report	Antonsen 45'; Olsen 76'; Jenssen (yellow card) 90+2'	Stadium: Brann Stadion; Attendance: 9,941; Referee: Svein Oddvar Moen

==== Table ====
Pos	Team	Pld	W	D	L	GF	GA	GD	Pts	Qualification or relegation
9	Stabæk	30	10	9	11	46	50	−4	39	
10	Haugesund	30	11	6	13	35	39	−4	39	
11	Tromsø	30	10	8	12	42	49	−7	38	
12	Lillestrøm	30	10	7	13	40	43	−3	37	Qualification for the Europa League second qualifying round (Note: Lillestrøm qualified for the Europa League second qualifying round as winners of the 2017 Norwegian Cup.)
13	Sandefjord	30	11	3	16	38	51	−13	36	

Source: Football Association of Norway (in Norwegian), Soccerway
Rules for classification: 1) Points; 2) Goal difference; 3) Goals scored; 4) Head-to-head points; 5) Head-to-head goal difference; 6) Head-to-head away goals scored (only if between two teams); 7) Head-to-head goals scored; 8) Play-off (only used to decide champions or relegation).

=== Norwegian Cup ===
26 April 2017 First Round	Bjørnevatn	0–5	Tromsø	Bjørnevatn
18:00 CEST (UTC+2)	Kurthi (yellow card) 41'; Nilsen (yellow card) 52'; Paulsen (yellow card) 67'; Amundsen (yellow card) 90+1'	Report	Michalsen 24'; Gerkondani (yellow card) 27'; Mathisen 47' (o.g.); Ingebrigtsen 61', 83'; Samb 65'	Stadium: Bjørneparken; Attendance: 642; Referee: Anders Karset Gjermshus

24 May 2017 Second Round	Finnsnes	0–2	Tromsø	Finnsnes
18:00 CEST (UTC+2)	A.Løvland (yellow card) 27'; A.Østeraas (yellow card) 54'; J.Nilsen (yellow card) 81'	Report	Jenssen (yellow card) 21'; Sigurðarson 29'; Gundersen 57'	Stadium: Finnsnes Stadion; Attendance: 534; Referee: Harald Sletner

31 May 2017 Third Round	Fløya	1–3	Tromsø	Tromsø
18:30 CEST (UTC+2)	A.Arntzen (yellow card) 41'; C.Olsen 90+2'	Report	Norbye (yellow card) 42'; T.Olsen 45'; Pedersen 59'; Ingebrigtsen 65'; Samb (yellow card) 67'; Kpozo (yellow card) 72'	Stadium: Fløya Arena; Attendance: 882; Referee: Mads Skarsem

9 August 2017 Fourth Round	Lillestrøm	1–0	Tromsø	Lillestrøm
18:00 CEST (UTC+2)	Mikalsen (yellow card) 47'; Ezeh (yellow card) 52'; Tagbajumi 57'	Report	Nilsen (yellow card) 83'	Stadium: Åråsen Stadion; Attendance: 2,125; Referee: Tore Hansen

== Squad statistics ==
As of match played 26 November 2017

=== Appearances and goals ===
No.	Pos	Nat	Player	Total		Tippeligaen		Norwegian Cup	
No.	Pos	Nat	Player	Apps	Goals	Apps	Goals	Apps	Goals
1	GK	(Norway) NOR	Gudmund Taksdal Kongshavn	26	0	25	0	1	0
3	DF	(Norway) NOR	Kent-Are Antonsen	27	1	24+1	1	1+1	0
4	DF	(Senegal) SEN	Mehdi Dioury	3	0	1	0	0+2	0
5	DF	(Norway) NOR	Magnar Ødegaard	33	1	28+1	1	3+1	0
6	MF	(Norway) NOR	Christian Landu Landu	26	1	15+9	1	2	0
7	MF	(Norway) NOR	Morten Gamst Pedersen	26	2	24	1	2	1
8	MF	(Norway) NOR	Ulrik Jenssen	30	1	25+2	1	2+1	0
9	FW	(Slovenia) SLO	Slobodan Vuk	10	0	2+7	0	0+1	0
10	FW	(Norway) NOR	Thomas Lehne Olsen	31	12	27+1	11	2+1	1
11	MF	(Norway) NOR	Jonas Johansen	4	0	2	0	2	0
14	DF	(Norway) NOR	Hans Norbye	27	1	15+8	1	4	0
15	MF	(Norway) NOR	Magnus Andersen	19	0	7+9	0	2+1	0
17	MF	(Iceland) ISL	Aron Sigurðarson	23	4	18+3	3	2	1
18	FW	(Senegal) SEN	Elhadji Mour Samb	19	1	4+12	0	3	1
22	DF	(Norway) NOR	Simen Wangberg	29	6	24+3	6	2	0
23	MF	(Norway) NOR	Gjermund Åsen	31	3	28+1	3	2	0
24	MF	(Norway) NOR	Mikael Ingebrigtsen	31	11	17+10	8	3+1	3
25	DF	(Norway) NOR	Lasse Nilsen	13	0	12	0	0+1	0
26	DF	(Norway) NOR	Jostein Gundersen	24	2	13+8	1	3	1
28	GK	(Norway) NOR	Jacob Karlstrom	8	0	5	0	3	0
30	FW	(Norway) NOR	Runar Espejord	6	0	4+2	0	0	0
32	MF	(Norway) NOR	Henrik Johnsgård	1	0	0	0	0+1	0
35	FW	(Norway) NOR	Garib Gerkondani	2	0	0	0	1+1	0
42	FW	(Norway) NOR	Mushaga Bakenga	8	3	8	3	0	0
Players away from Tromsø on loan:
27	MF	(Norway) NOR	Fredrik Michalsen	2	1	0+1	0	1	1
Players who left Tromsø during the season:
16	DF	(Senegal) SEN	Patrick Kpozo	5	0	2	0	3	0

=== Goal scorers ===
Place	Position	Nation	Number	Name	Tippeligaen	Norwegian Cup	Total
1	FW	(Norway)	10	Thomas Lehne Olsen	11	1	12
1	MF	(Norway)	24	Mikael Ingebrigtsen	8	3	11
3	DF	(Norway)	22	Simen Wangberg	6	0	6
4	MF	(Iceland)	17	Aron Sigurðarson	3	1	4
5	MF	(Norway)	23	Gjermund Åsen	3	0	3
5	FW	(Norway)	42	Mushaga Bakenga	3	0	3
7	DF	(Norway)	26	Jostein Gundersen	1	1	2
7	MF	(Norway)	7	Morten Gamst Pedersen	1	1	2
7				Own goal	1	1	2
10	DF	(Norway)	14	Hans Norbye	1	0	1
10	MF	(Norway)	8	Ulrik Jenssen	1	0	1
10	MF	(Norway)	6	Christian Landu Landu	1	0	1
10	DF	(Norway)	5	Magnar Ødegaard	1	0	1
10	DF	(Norway)	3	Kent-Are Antonsen	1	0	1
10	MF	(Norway)	27	Fredrik Michalsen	0	1	1
10	FW	(Senegal)	18	Elhadji Mour Samb	0	1	1
				TOTALS	42	10	52

=== Disciplinary record ===
Number	Nation	Position	Name	Tippeligaen		Norwegian Cup		Total	
Number	Nation	Position	Name	Yellow card	Red card	Yellow card	Red card	Yellow card	Red card
3	(Norway)	DF	Kent-Are Antonsen	2	1	0	0	2	1
5	(Norway)	DF	Magnar Ødegaard	3	0	0	0	3	0
6	(Norway)	MF	Christian Landu Landu	4	0	0	0	4	0
7	(Norway)	MF	Morten Gamst Pedersen	4	1	0	0	4	1
8	(Norway)	MF	Ulrik Jenssen	4	0	1	0	5	0
10	(Norway)	FW	Thomas Lehne Olsen	2	0	0	0	2	0
14	(Norway)	DF	Hans Norbye	1	0	1	0	2	0
15	(Norway)	MF	Magnus Andersen	1	0	0	0	1	0
16	(Ghana)	DF	Patrick Kpozo	1	0	1	0	2	0
17	(Iceland)	MF	Aron Sigurðarson	1	0	0	0	1	0
18	(Senegal)	FW	Elhadji Mour Samb	1	0	1	0	2	0
22	(Norway)	DF	Simen Wangberg	3	0	0	0	3	0
23	(Norway)	MF	Gjermund Åsen	2	0	0	0	2	0
24	(Norway)	MF	Mikael Ingebrigtsen	2	0	0	0	2	0
25	(Norway)	DF	Lasse Nilsen	2	0	1	0	3	0
26	(Norway)	DF	Jostein Gundersen	2	0	0	0	2	0
27	(Norway)	MF	Fredrik Michalsen	1	0	0	0	1	0
35	(Norway)	FW	Garib Gerkondani	0	0	1	0	1	0
42	(Norway)	FW	Mushaga Bakenga	1	0	0	0	1	0
			TOTALS	37	2	6	0	43	2
