= Gudmund Taksdal Kongshavn =

Norwegian footballer (born 1991)

Gudmund Kongshavn
Personal information
- Full name: Gudmund Taksdal Kongshavn
- Date of birth: 23 January 1991 (age 35)
- Place of birth: Oslo, Norway
- Height: 1.89 m (6 ft 2 in)
- Position: Goalkeeper

Team information
- Current team: Tromsdalen

Youth career
- –2008: IL Varegg
- 2008: Vålerenga

Senior career*
Years	Team	Apps	(Gls)
2009–2014	Vålerenga	32	(1)
2014	→ Sarpsborg 08 (loan)	7	(0)
2015–2019	Tromsø	83	(0)
2020	Aalesund	14	(0)
2021	Dinamo București	5	(0)
2022–	Tromsdalen	2	(0)

International career^{‡}
2009	Norway U18	1	(0)
2009–2010	Norway U19	2	(0)
- * Club domestic league appearances and goals as of 7 February 2024 ‡ National team caps and goals as of 15 August 2013

Gudmund Taksdal Kongshavn (born 23 January 1991) is a Norwegian football goalkeeper, who plays for Tromsdalen.

He was born in Oslo, moved with his family to Bergen as a small child and played for IL Varegg before joining Vålerenga's youth team ahead of the 2008 season. He made his Norwegian Premier League debut on 26 July 2009 against Odd Grenland; despite not even being considered a part of the senior squad at the time. Before the 2015 season he signed a contract for Tromsø. Before the 2020 season he signed for Aalesund.

In February 2021, he signed a contract with Liga I side Dinamo București. In June 2021 Kongshavn decide to retire to spend time with family and work for the organization MOT.

In August 2022, although he had actually stopped, he signed a contract with Tromsdalen UIL in PostNord-ligaen.

== Career statistics ==
As of 7 February 2024

Appearances and goals by club, season and competition
Club	Season	League			National Cup		Total	
Club	Season	Division	Apps	Goals	Apps	Goals	Apps	Goals
Vålerenga	2009	Tippeligaen	1	0	0	0	1	0
Vålerenga	2010	Tippeligaen	0	0	0	0	0	0
Vålerenga	2011	Tippeligaen	0	0	1	0	1	0
Vålerenga	2012	Tippeligaen	4	0	0	0	4	0
Vålerenga	2013	Tippeligaen	25	1	3	0	28	1
Vålerenga	2014	Tippeligaen	2	0	1	0	3	0
Vålerenga	Total		32	1	5	0	37	1
Sarpsborg 08 (loan)	2014	Tippeligaen	7	0	2	0	9	0
Sarpsborg 08 (loan)	Total		7	0	2	0	9	0
Tromsø	2015	Tippeligaen	3	0	0	0	3	0
Tromsø	2016	Tippeligaen	14	0	1	0	15	0
Tromsø	2017	Eliteserien	25	0	1	0	26	0
Tromsø	2018	Eliteserien	25	0	0	0	25	0
Tromsø	2019	Eliteserien	16	0	1	0	17	0
Tromsø	Total		83	0	3	0	86	0
Aalesund	2020	Eliteserien	14	0	-		14	0
Aalesund	Total		14	0	0	0	14	0
Dinamo București	2020–21	Liga I	5	0	1	0	6	0
Dinamo București	Total		5	0	1	0	6	0
Tromsdalen	2022	PostNord-ligaen	2	0	1	0	3	0
Tromsdalen	2023	PostNord-ligaen	0	0	1	0	1	0
Tromsdalen	Total		2	0	2	0	4	0
Career total			143	1	13	0	156	1

== Honours ==
Norway U21

- UEFA European Under-21 Championship bronze: 2013
