= Magnus Andersen (footballer, born 1986) =

Norwegian football midfielder (born 1986)

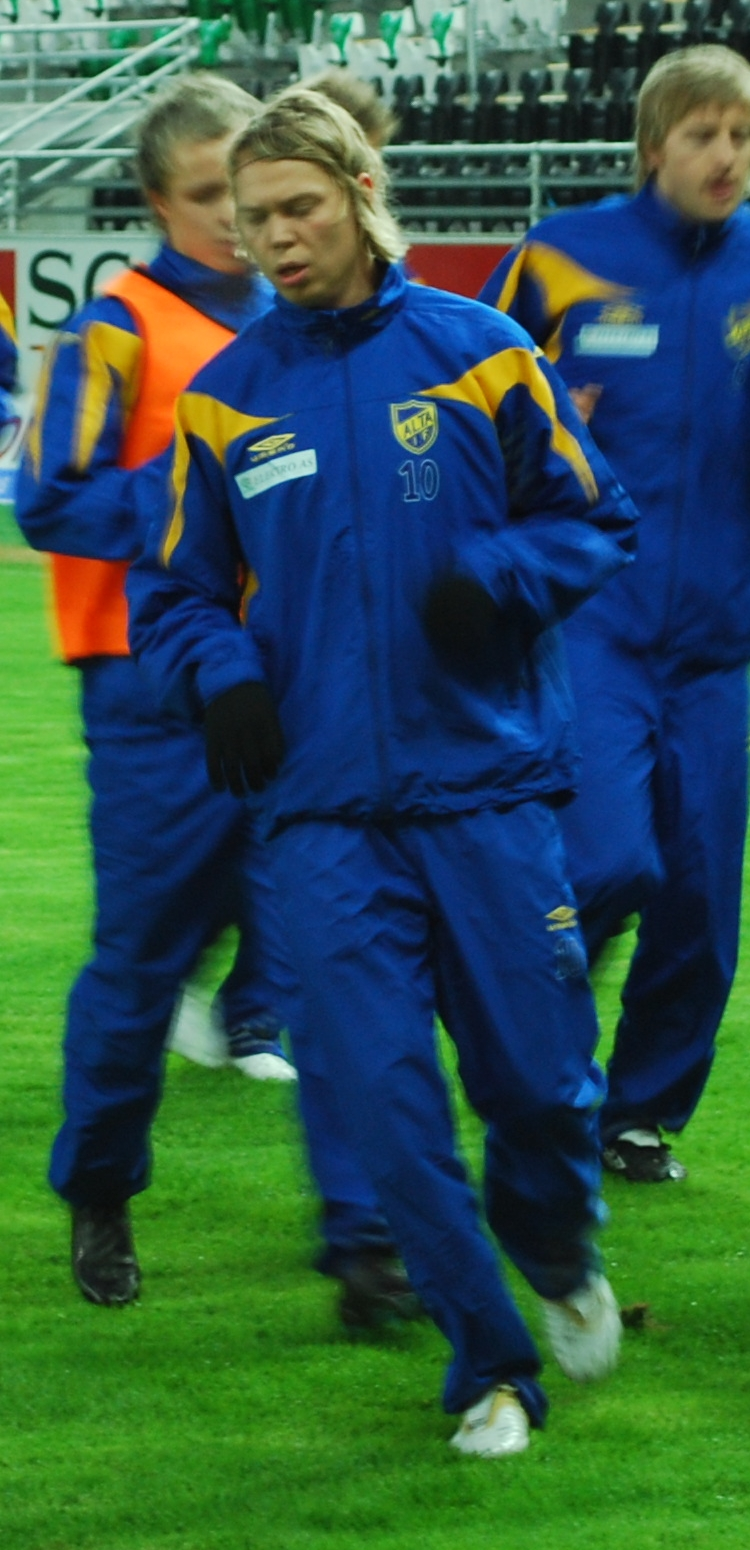

Personal information
- Full name: Magnus Andersen
- Date of birth: 28 May 1986 (age 40)
- Place of birth: Øksfjord, Norway
- Height: 1.79 m (5 ft 10 1/2 in)
- Position: Midfielder

Youth career
- Øksfjord

Senior career*
Years	Team	Apps	(Gls)
2005–2010	Alta	86	(13)
2011–2021	Tromsø	251	(43)
2022–2025	Alta	75	(6)
Total		412	(62)

International career
2003	Norway U17	1	(0)
2004	Norway U18	6	(0)
2006	Sápmi	3	(1)
- * Club domestic league appearances and goals as of 3 November 2025

Magnus Andersen (born 28 May 1986) is a retired Norwegian football midfielder. Through his career he played for both Alta and Tromsø.

== Career ==
Anderson started his career with Øksfjord IL. He represented Norway on U17 and U18 level. He went on to Alta IF, before transferring to Tromsø IL in the 2010/11 winter transfer window. During Tromsø IL's 2011-12 Europa League Qualification, Anderson scored a brace in their first leg, 5-0 thrashing against Latvian club Daugava Daugavpils. He has scored seven total goals in European competitions for Tromsø, making him joint European top scorer for the club together with Ole Martin Årst.

After leaving Tromsø after eleven seasons, Andersen announced he would return to play for his former club Alta.

Andersen announced he would retire from football after the 2024 season.

== Career statistics ==
=== Club ===
As of 10 February 2025

Appearances and goals by club, season and competition
Club	Season	League			National Cup		Europe		Total	
Club	Season	Division	Apps	Goals	Apps	Goals	Apps	Goals	Apps	Goals
Alta	2008	1. divisjon	29	4	1	1	—		30	5
Alta	2009	1. divisjon	28	4	2	1	—		30	5
Alta	2010	1. divisjon	29	5	2	1	—		31	6
Alta	Total		86	13	5	3	—		91	16
Tromsø	2011	Eliteserien	26	5	4	1	4 (Note: Appearances in UEFA Europa League)	3	34	9
Tromsø	2012	Eliteserien	30	4	6	0	6	0	42	4
Tromsø	2013	Eliteserien	28	6	3	1	12	2	43	9
Tromsø	2014	1. divisjon	30	12	0	0	4	4	34	16
Tromsø	2015	Eliteserien	30	7	2	0	—		32	7
Tromsø	2016	Eliteserien	27	2	5	1	—		32	3
Tromsø	2017	Eliteserien	16	0	3	0	—		19	0
Tromsø	2018	Eliteserien	9	1	3	0	—		12	1
Tromsø	2019	Eliteserien	24	4	2	0	—		26	4
Tromsø	2020	1. divisjon	24	2	—		—		24	2
Tromsø	2021	Eliteserien	7	0	1	0	—		8	0
Tromsø	Total		251	43	29	3	26	9	306	55
Alta	2022	2. divisjon	24	0	1	0	—		25	0
Alta	2023	2. divisjon	23	3	2	2	—		25	5
Alta	2024	2. divisjon	21	3	2	0	—		23	3
Alta	Total		68	6	5	2	—		73	8
Career total			405	62	39	8	26	9	470	79

== Honours ==
Tromsø

- 1. divisjon: 2020
- Norwegian Cup runner-up: 2012
