= Lasse Nilsen =

Norwegian footballer (born 1995)

Personal information
- Date of birth: 21 February 1995 (age 31)
- Place of birth: Bleik, Norway
- Height: 1.78 m (5 ft 10 in)
- Position: Defender

Team information
- Current team: Tromsdalen
- Number: 3

Youth career
- Høken
- Andenes
- 2012–2014: Tromsø

Senior career*
Years	Team	Apps	(Gls)
2014–2024	Tromsø	180	(6)
2017	→ Tromsdalen (loan)	15	(1)
2025–	Tromsdalen	13	(0)

International career^{‡}
2013	Norway U18	2	(0)
- * Club domestic league appearances and goals as of 3 November 2025 ‡ National team caps and goals as of 4 February 2024

Lasse Nilsen (born 21 February 1995) is a Norwegian football defender who plays plays for Tromsdalen.

== Career ==
He hails from Bleik and started his youth career in Høken, moving on to Andenes around his early teens. He then went to the regional great team Tromsø IL, with whom he signed a professional contract in April 2014. He plays as a left back or winger.

He made his first team debut in the 2014 Norwegian First Division, which ended with Tromsø being promoted, and made his first-tier debut in May 2015 against Odd.

In April 2018, he scored his first goal against Ranheim IL in a 4-0 win. He also scored the deciding goal in a 2-1 win against Rosenborg BK in June 2018.

At the end of the 2024 season, it was confirmed that Nilsen's contract with Tromsø expired after the season and would not be extended.

After half a year without a club, Tromsdalen announced that they had signed Nilsen in June 2025, reuniting him with the club he was previously loaned out to after eight years. Nilsen signed an amateur contract so that he would have the possibility to sign for another club if the opportunity came.

== Career statistics ==
As of 17 September 2025

Appearances and goals by club, season and competition
Club	Season	League			National Cup		Europe		Total	
Club	Season	Division	Apps	Goals	Apps	Goals	Apps	Goals	Apps	Goals
Tromsø	2014	1. divisjon	13	0	3	0	4 (Note: Appearances in UEFA Europa League)	0	20	0
Tromsø	2015	Eliteserien	11	0	2	0	—		13	0
Tromsø	2016	Eliteserien	11	0	1	0	—		12	0
Tromsø	2017	Eliteserien	12	0	1	0	—		13	0
Tromsø	2018	Eliteserien	26	3	2	0	—		28	3
Tromsø	2019	Eliteserien	23	1	3	1	—		26	2
Tromsø	2020	1. divisjon	15	1	—		—		15	1
Tromsø	2021	Eliteserien	17	0	2	0	—		19	0
Tromsø	2022	Eliteserien	27	1	2	0	—		29	1
Tromsø	2023	Eliteserien	8	0	4	0	—		12	0
Tromsø	2024	Eliteserien	17	0	2	0	3 (Note: Appearances in UEFA Conference League)	0	22	0
Tromsø	Total		180	6	22	1	7	0	209	7
Tromsdalen (loan)	2017	1. divisjon	15	1	0	0	—		15	1
Tromsdalen	2025	2. divisjon	8	0	1	1	–		9	1
Career total			203	7	23	2	7	0	233	9
