= Thomas Kind Bendiksen =

Norwegian footballer (born 1989)

Personal information
- Full name: Thomas Kind Bendiksen
- Date of birth: 8 August 1989 (age 37)
- Place of birth: Harstad, Norway
- Height: 1.83 m (6 ft 0 in)
- Position: Attacking midfielder

Team information
- Current team: Tromsdalen
- Number: 8

Youth career
- Harstad IL

Senior career*
Years	Team	Apps	(Gls)
2007–2011	Rangers	3	(0)
2012–2014	Tromsø	80	(11)
2014–2016	Molde	6	(0)
2015	→ Tromsø (loan)	11	(0)
2016	→ Elfsborg (loan)	9	(0)
2016–2018	Sandefjord	0	(0)
2019–2020	Tromsdalen	36	(2)
2021	Finnsnes	5	(0)
2022-	Skarp	28	(3)

International career^{‡}
2006	Norway U17	5	(0)
2007	Norway U18	9	(4)
2008	Norway U19	4	(0)
2012	Norway U23	1	(0)
2014	Norway	2	(0)
- * Club domestic league appearances and goals as of 16 February 2024 ‡ National team caps and goals as of 20 November 2014

Thomas Kind Bendiksen (born 8 August 1989) is a Norwegian association footballer. He currently plays for Tromsdalen.

== Career ==
=== Club ===
A Norwegian youth international, Bendiksen signed for Rangers on 31 August 2007 on a three-year deal from Harstad IL. Rangers paid the Norwegian side 1 million Norwegian krone (around £90,000). A long-term knee injury put his career on hold and ruled him out of the entire 2008–09 season and most of the following season.

Bendiksen impressed in reserve team games when he returned to action late in the 2009–10 season, and he was named as a substitute for a league match against Hibernian in April 2010. Bendiksen made his first 'first team' appearance in a pre-season friendly match against Queen of the South in July 2010. After further injury problems, he agreed to a new six-month contract in July 2011. Bendiksen scored a goal in a friendly match against Hamburg, after which he was offered a new contract. He played his first competitive match for Rangers on 3 December 2011, in a 2–1 win home against Dunfermline Athletic.

Bendiksen rejected the offer of a new contract by Rangers and instead signed a deal with Tromsø.

==== Molde ====
On 23 December 2014 Bendiksen signed for Molde FK.

On 29 July 2015, Bendiksen joined Tromsø on loan for the remainder of the 2015 season.

On 31 March 2016, Bendiksen joined Elfsborg on a season-long loan deal.

He left the club on 5 December 2016, when his contract was terminated.

== Career statistics ==
=== Club ===
As of 16 February 2024

Appearances and goals by club, season and competition
Club	Season	League			National Cup (Note: Includes Norwegian Football Cup, Svenska Cupen)		Europe		Total	
Club	Season	Division	Apps	Goals	Apps	Goals	Apps	Goals	Apps	Goals
Rangers	2011–12	Scottish Premiership	3	0	0	0	0	0	3	0
Rangers	Total		3	0	0	0	0	0	3	0
Tromsø	2012	Tippeligaen	23	1	6	0	5 (Note: Appearances in the UEFA Europa League)	0	34	1
Tromsø	2013	Tippeligaen	27	6	3	2	14	1	44	9
Tromsø	2014	1. divisjon	30	4	3	2	4	0	37	6
Tromsø	Total		80	11	12	4	23	1	115	16
Molde	2015	Tippeligaen	6	0	4	1	1 (Note: Appearances in the UEFA Champions League)	0	11	1
Molde	Total		6	0	4	1	1	0	11	1
Tromsø (loan)	2015	Tippeligaen	11	0	0	0	—		11	0
Tromsø (loan)	Total		11	0	0	0	—		11	0
Elfsborg (loan)	2016	Allsvenskan	9	0	1	2	—		10	2
Elfsborg (loan)	Total		9	0	1	2	—		10	2
Sandefjord	2017	Eliteserien	0	0	0	0	—		0	0
Sandefjord	2018	Eliteserien	0	0	0	0	—		0	0
Sandefjord	Total		0	0	0	0	—		0	0
Tromsdalen	2019	OBOS-ligaen	22	2	4	1	—		26	3
Tromsdalen	2020	PostNord-ligaen	14	0	—		—		14	0
Tromsdalen	Total		36	2	4	1	—		40	3
Finnsnes	2021	Norsk Tipping-ligaen	5	0	0	0	—		5	0
Finnsnes	Total		5	0	0	0	—		5	0
Skarp	2022	4. divisjon	18	0	1	0	—		19	0
Skarp	2023	4. divisjon	10	3	0	0	—		10	3
Skarp	2024	4. divisjon	0	0	0	0	—		0	0
Skarp	Total		28	3	1	0	—		29	3
Career total			178	16	22	8	24	1	224	25

=== International ===
Norway national team
Year	Apps	Goals
2014	2	0
Total	2	0

Statistics accurate as of match played 18 January 2014
