= Marin Oršulić =

Croatian footballer

Personal information
- Full name: Marin Oršulić
- Date of birth: 25 August 1987 (age 39)
- Place of birth: Metković, SFR Yugoslavia
- Height: 1.95 m (6 ft 5 in)
- Position: Centre back

Team information
- Current team: HNK Segesta (manager)

Youth career
- –2005: Jadran LP

Senior career*
Years	Team	Apps	(Gls)
2005–2012	NK Zagreb	105	(5)
2013	Khazar Lankaran	13	(0)
2013–2014	Zadar	20	(1)
2014–2015	CSKA Sofia	16	(2)
2015	Tromsø	7	(0)
2016–2017	Omonia	29	(0)
2017–2018	Seongnam FC	15	(0)
2019	Kaysar Kyzylorda		

Managerial career
- 2019: Neretvanac Opuzen
- 2020: Omonia Psevda (assistant)
- 2025–: HNK Segesta
- * Club domestic league appearances and goals

Marin Oršulić (born 25 August 1987) is a Croatian former professional footballer who played as a defender and currently manager of Segesta Sisak.

== Career ==
Previously he played for NK Zagreb where he was the youngest team captain in First Croatian League.

=== Khazar Lankaran ===
In the winter transfer window of 2012–13 season, Oršulić joined Azerbaijan Premier League side Khazar Lankaran on a two-year contract. On 26 July 2013, following a defeat to Maccabi Haifa in the 2nd Qualifying round of the 2013–14 UEFA Europa League, Oršulić and all the foreign player left Khazar Lankaran whilst still having 18 months to run on his contract.

=== CSKA Sofia ===
In July 2014, Oršulić signed a one-year contract with Bulgarian club CSKA Sofia.

=== Tromsø ===
Oršulić went to Norway Tippeligaen side Tromsø IL, and signed with them on 14 August 2015.

=== Seongnam FC ===
On 3 Feb 2017, Seongnam FC announced their newest signing, Marin Oršulić.
