= Christer Johnsgård =

Norwegian footballer (born 1987)

Personal information
- Date of birth: 17 February 1987 (age 39)
- Place of birth: Silsand, Norway
- Height: 1.80 m (5 ft 11 in)
- Position: Striker

Team information
- Current team: Tromsdalen
- Number: 22

Youth career
- Senja

Senior career*
Years	Team	Apps	(Gls)
2007–2012	Tromsdalen	84	(17)
2012–2015	Senja	77	(70)
2016	Tromsø	2	(0)
2017–	Tromsdalen	2	(0)
2017	→ Senja (loan)	12	(16)
- * Club domestic league appearances and goals as of 22 October 2017

Christer Johnsgård (born 17 February 1987) is a Norwegian footballer who plays as a striker for Tromsdalen.

Johnsgård was born in Silsand. After one season in Tromsø IL he joined Tromsdalen UIL ahead of the 2017 season. Later that same season he moved on to fourth-tier club FK Senja.

He has also had a career in television, presenting the children's show Kråkeklubben on NRK Super.

== Career statistics ==
As of match played 21 October 2017.

Season	Club	Division	League		Cup		Europe		Total	
Season	Club	Division	Apps	Goals	Apps	Goals	Apps	Goals	Apps	Goals
2007	Tromsdalen	1. divisjon	16	3	1	2	-	-	17	5
2008	Tromsdalen	2. divisjon								
2009	Tromsdalen	1. divisjon	6	0	0	0	-	-	6	0
2010	Tromsdalen	1. divisjon	23	4	3	0	-	-	26	4
2011	Tromsdalen	2. divisjon	26	10	2	1	-	-	28	11
2012	Tromsdalen	1. divisjon	13	0	2	1	-	-	15	1
2012	Senja	2. divisjon	9	8	0	0	-	-	9	8
2013	Senja	2. divisjon	21	7	1	0	-	-	22	8
2014	Senja	3. divisjon	22	34	1	1	-	-	23	35
2015	Senja	2. divisjon	25	21	2	1	-	-	27	22
2016	Tromsø	Tippeligaen	2	0	2	2	-	-	4	2
2017	Tromsdalen	1. divisjon	2	0	2	1	-	-	4	1
2017	Senja	3. divisjon	12	16	0	0	-	-	12	16
2018	Tromsdalen	1. divisjon	0	0	0	0	-	-	0	0
Career Total			177	103	16	9	-	-	193	112
