= Benny Lekström =

Swedish footballer

Personal information
- Full name: Benny Johan Einar Lekström
- Date of birth: 19 February 1981 (age 45)
- Place of birth: Enskede, Stockholm, Sweden
- Height: 1.91 m (6 ft 3 in)
- Position: Goalkeeper

Team information
- Current team: IF Brommapojkarna (goalkeeper coach)

Senior career*
Years	Team	Apps	(Gls)
2000–2005	Enskede IK		
2005–2007	Hammarby IF	10	(0)
2008–2010	IF Brommapojkarna	15	(0)
2011	FK Mjølner	20	
2012–2015	Tromsø IL	63	(0)
2016–2017	IK Sirius	11	(0)
2017–2018	Hammarby IF	0	(0)
2019	IF Brommapojkarna	3	(0)
- * Club domestic league appearances and goals

Benny Johan Einar Lekström (born 19 February 1981) Swedish former footballer who played as a goalkeeper. He is a current goalkeeper coach of IF Brommapojkarna.

He has previously played for Enskede IK, IF Brommapojkarna, FK Mjølner, Tromsø IL and IK Sirius.

== Career ==
Born in Enskede, Sweden, Lekström played for Hammarby IF from 2005 to 2007, and left Hammarby on a free transfer to IF Brommapojkarna, where he played from 2008 to 2010. After one season in the Norwegian club Mjølner, Lekstrøm signed a two-year deal with Tromsø on 19 October 2011, starting from January 2012.

He represented IK Sirius during one season in 2016, before leaving the club by mutual consent.

On 14 July 2017, Lekström returned to Hammarby on a six month-contract. He left the club at the end of 2018. On 22 February 2019, he joined IF Brommapojkarna to replace first keeper Hampus Elgán, who had been injured. On 5 August 2019 the club announced that Lekström would continue at the club as a goalkeeper coach.

== Career statistics ==
As of 9 June 2018

Season	Club	Division	League		Cup		Total	
Season	Club	Division	Apps	Goals	Apps	Goals	Apps	Goals
2012	Tromsø	Tippeligaen	20	0	2	0	22	0
2013	Tromsø	Tippeligaen	4	0	3	0	7	0
2014	Tromsø	1. divisjon	30	0	1	0	31	0
2015	Tromsø	Tippeligaen	9	0	0	0	9	0
2016	IK Sirius	Superettan	11	0	0	0	11	0
2017	Hammarby IF	Allsvenskan	0	0	0	0	0	0
2018	Hammarby IF	Allsvenskan	0	0	3	0	3	0
Career Total			74	0	9	0	80	0

== Honours ==
IK Sirius

- Superettan: 2016
