= Elias Uppheim Skogvoll =

Norwegian footballer (born 1996)

Personal information
- Date of birth: 5 May 1996 (age 30)
- Position: Midfielder

Team information
- Current team: Tromsdalen
- Number: 8

Youth career
- –2011: Ballangen
- 2011–2012: Mjølner
- 2012–2014: Tromsø

Senior career*
Years	Team	Apps	(Gls)
2011	Ballangen		
2014	Tromsø	0	(0)
2015–2018	Tromsdalen	50	(3)
2018–2019	Mjølner	40	(7)
2020–2021	Odd	3	(0)
2021	→ Grorud (loan)	4	(0)
2022–	Tromsdalen	121	(30)

International career
2011	Norway U15	3	(0)
2012	Norway U16	9	(0)
2013	Norway U17	8	(1)
2014	Norway U18	4	(0)
- * Club domestic league appearances and goals as of 15 November 2026

Elias Uppheim Skogvoll (born 5 May 1996) is a Norwegian football midfielder who plays for Tromsdalen.

Hailing from Ballangen Municipality, he made his senior debut for Ballangen on the sixth tier in 2011 before playing youth football for Mjølner and Tromsø. He also represented Norway as a youth international In Tromsø he also made his senior debut, in the 2014 Norwegian Football Cup match against Mjølner. To play regular senior football, he joined Tromsdalen in 2015. Here he won promotion to the 2017 1. divisjon, but the next year he stepped down one notch to play for third-tier Mjølner. Ahead of the 2020 season he was signed by Odd and made his first-tier debut in June 2020 against Strømsgodset.
