= Fredrik Michalsen =

Norwegian footballer (born 1996)

Personal information
- Date of birth: 15 September 1996 (age 30)
- Place of birth: Tromsø, Norway
- Height: 1.89 m (6 ft 2 1/2 in)
- Position: Midfielder

Team information
- Current team: Fløya
- Number: 27

Youth career
- Fløya
- Tromsø

Senior career*
Years	Team	Apps	(Gls)
2016–2017	Tromsø	7	(0)
2017	→ Fjölnir (loan)		
2018–	Fløya		
- * Club domestic league appearances and goals as of 6 August 2017

Fredrik Michalsen (born 15 September 1996) is a Norwegian football midfielder who currently plays for IF Fløya.

Michalsen attended the Norwegian College of Elite Sport in Tromsø, and trained with Tromsø IL's first team through most of 2015. He was then officially drafted into the senior team, and made his debut in May 2016 against Stabæk. On 1 August 2017 Michalsen went on loan to the Iceland club Fjölnir for the rest of the season.

In 2018 he quit Tromsø and joined childhood club IF Fløya.

== Career statistics ==
As of 6 August 2017

Season	Club	Division	League		Cup		Total	
Season	Club	Division	Apps	Goals	Apps	Goals	Apps	Goals
2015	Tromsø	Tippeligaen	0	0	0	0	0	0
2016	Tromsø	Tippeligaen	6	0	2	1	8	1
2017	Tromsø	Eliteserien	1	0	1	1	2	1
2017	Fjölnir	Úrvalsdeild						
Career total			7	0	3	2	10	2
