= Lars Gunnar Johnsen =

Norwegian footballer (born 1991)

Personal information
- Full name: Lars Gunnar Johnsen
- Date of birth: 2 July 1991 (age 35)
- Place of birth: Silsand, Norway
- Height: 1.78 m (5 ft 10 in)
- Position: Midfielder

Youth career
- Senja

Senior career*
Years	Team	Apps	(Gls)
2009–2012	Tromsdalen	91	(0)
2013–2015	Tromsø	28	(0)
2016–2018	Tromsdalen	53	(0)
2019–2020	HamKam	40	(0)
2020	Tromsø	4	(0)

International career
2006	Norway U15	2	(0)
2007	Norway U16	10	(2)
2008	Norway U17	7	(0)
2009	Norway U18	2	(0)
- * Club domestic league appearances and goals

Lars Gunnar Johnsen (born 2 July 1991) is a Norwegian former footballer.

Johnsen was born in Silsand.

He previously played for Tromsdalen UIL, where he made his debut on 13 April 2009. In winter of 2013, Johnsen got a contract with Tromsø IL.

Johnsen signed for HamKam on 22 December 2018. He retired after the 2020 season.

== Career statistics ==
As of 14 December 2020

Season	Club	Division	League		Cup		Europe		Total	
Season	Club	Division	Apps	Goals	Apps	Goals	Apps	Goals	Apps	Goals
2009	Tromsdalen	1. divisjon	19	0	0	0	0	0	19	0
2010	Tromsdalen	1. divisjon	21	0	2	0	0	0	23	0
2011	Tromsdalen	2. divisjon	23	0	0	0	0	0	23	0
2012	Tromsdalen	1. divisjon	28	0	3	0	0	0	31	0
2013	Tromsø	Tippeligaen	9	0	3	1	7	0	19	1
2014	Tromsø	1. divisjon	18	0	3	0	4	1	25	1
2015	Tromsø	Tippeligaen	1	0	0	0	-	-	1	0
2016	Tromsdalen	2. divisjon	24	0	3	0	0	0	27	0
2017	Tromsdalen	1. divisjon	25	0	2	0	0	0	23	0
2018	Tromsdalen	1. divisjon	28	0	1	0	0	0	29	0
2019	HamKam	1. divisjon	30	0	1	0	0	0	31	0
2020	HamKam	1. divisjon	10	0	0	0	0	0	10	0
2020	Tromsø	1. divisjon	4	0	0	0	0	0	4	0
Career Total			240	0	18	1	11	1	269	2
