= Zdeněk Ondrášek =

Czech footballer

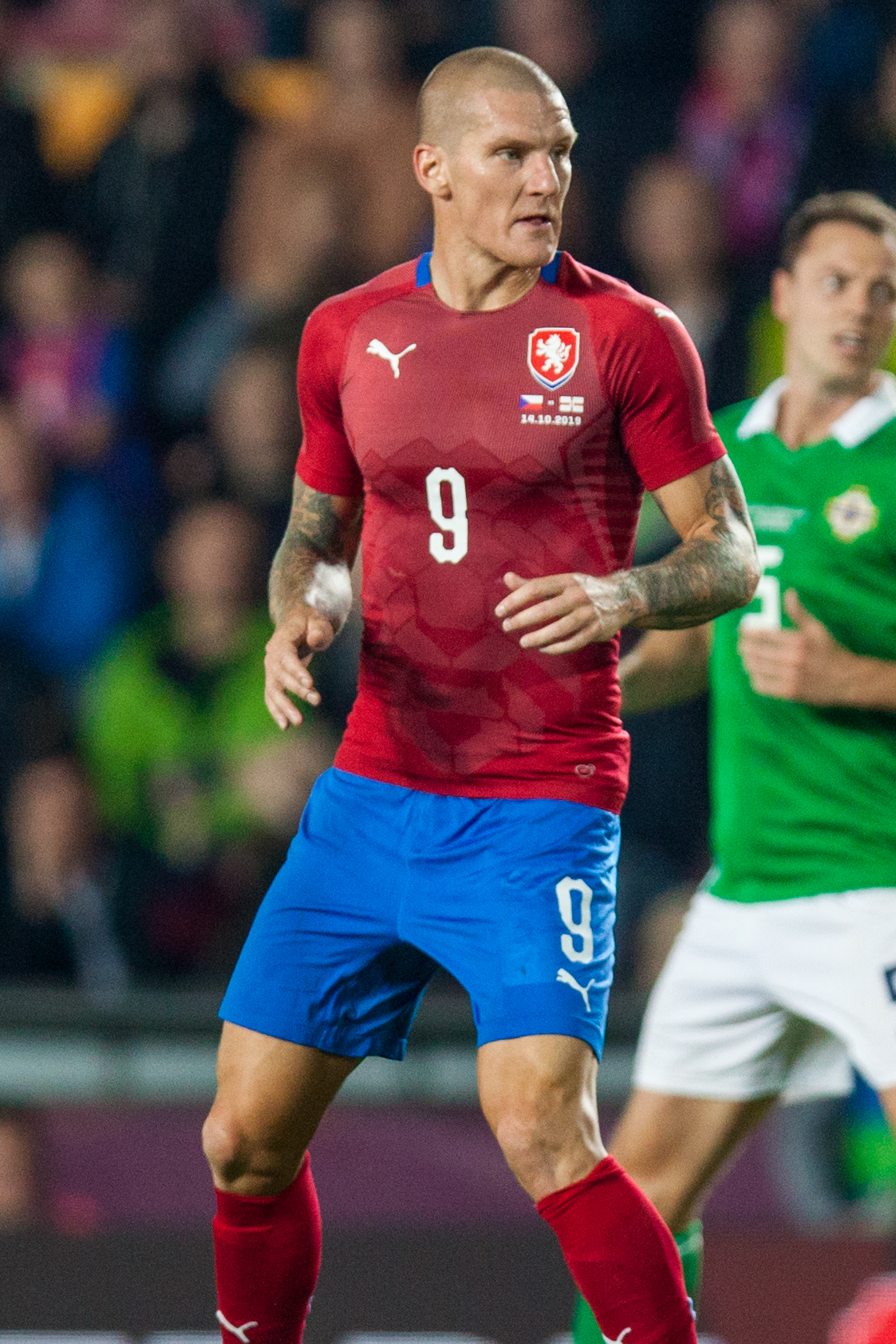
- Ondrášek with the Czech Republic in 2019

Personal information
- Date of birth: 22 December 1988 (age 37)
- Place of birth: Strakonice, Czechoslovakia
- Height: 1.85 m (6 ft 1 in)
- Position: Forward

Youth career
- 1998–2000: TJ Baník Stříbro
- 2000–2005: TJ Blatná
- 2005–2007: Dynamo České Budějovice

Senior career*
Years	Team	Apps	(Gls)
2007–2012	Dynamo České Budějovice	80	(22)
2009	→ Zenit Čáslav (loan)	14	(4)
2012	→ Tromsø (loan)	14	(8)
2012–2015	Tromsø	96	(38)
2016–2018	Wisła Kraków	66	(20)
2019–2020	FC Dallas	23	(9)
2020–2021	Viktoria Plzeň	31	(6)
2021	FCSB	2	(0)
2021	Tromsø	11	(1)
2022–2023	Wisła Kraków	15	(2)
2023–2025	Dynamo České Budějovice	47	(6)
2025–2026	Viktoria Žižkov	25	(6)

International career
2011	Czech Republic U21	3	(0)
2019–2020	Czech Republic	7	(2)
- * Club domestic league appearances and goals as of 28 May 2026

Zdeněk Ondrášek (born 22 December 1988) is a Czech professional footballer who plays as a forward.

== Club career ==
=== Dynamo České Budějovice ===
Ondrášek started his career in the South-Bohemian side České Budějovice in 2007, doing a short loan-spell at FC Zenit Čáslav in 2009. Upon returning to Dynamo, he delivered a decent season, becoming the top scorer for the club during the 2010–11 Czech First League. The following season he was seen as the key pillar of the team, scoring eight league goals in twenty rounds. The last two matches he was injured due to a fractured finger. His good performance drew the attention of foreign clubs. Upon his transfer to Tromsø in 2012, the manager of Dynamo Jiří Kotrba noted that if the sale went through it would be an historic event, as it was the first time in history that Dynamo had sold a player directly abroad.

=== Tromsø IL ===
Ondrášek joined the Norwegian side Tromsø IL on a loan in March 2012. He made an immediate impact on the club. In the league opener, Ondrášek came in off the bench for his debut and, despite heavy snow, scored the only goal in a 1–0 win against Fredrikstad FK. His starting debut came a week later 4 April during an away draw against Aalesunds FK. He continued playing well and contributed a total of 8 goals in 14 matches before Tromsø IL decided to make the move permanent and signed him to a contract that will see him stay at the club until 2015. The season proved to be a great success for the Czech striker, seeing him score 14 goals and becoming the top goalscorer in the league that season. This was just two goals short of his pre-season pledge of 16.

=== Wisła Kraków ===
Ondrášek was transferred to Polish first-division team Wisła Kraków in 2016, where he has appeared in 66 matches in Ekstraklasa, scoring 20 goals and nine assists. He has also scored one goal and one assist in three Polish Cup matches.

=== FC Dallas ===
Ondrášek signed with FC Dallas of Major League Soccer on 18 December 2018.

=== Viktoria Plzeň ===
On 13 September 2020, Ondrášek signed for Viktoria Plzeň for an undisclosed fee. He made the decision to return to the Czech Republic for family reasons.

=== FCSB ===
Ondrášek signed with Romanian Liga 1 club FCSB on 28 June 2021. On 29 July, club owner Gigi Becali terminated his contract after just one month at the club and 68 minutes of total playing time. Becali said, "This is not a player for our team, it does not reach our level".

=== Return to former clubs ===
On 30 August 2021, Tromsø IL announced that Ondrášek had signed with the club, reuniting him with the team.

Having left Tromsø at the end of 2021, he returned to Wisła Kraków after signing a one-and-a-half-year deal with the Polish side on 7 January 2022.

On 23 June 2023, Ondrášek signed as a free agent with Dynamo České Budějovice a two-year contract.

=== Viktoria Žižkov ===
On 23 July 2025, Ondrášek signed a contract with Czech National Football League club Viktoria Žižkov as a free agent.

== International career ==
On 2 October 2019, Ondrášek received his first senior call up from the Czech Republic for their UEFA Euro 2020 qualifier against England. On 11 October in his international debut, he came on as a substitute and scored the winning goal for the Czech Republic in their 2–1 victory over England.

== Personal life ==
Nicknamed "The Cobra" (Czech: Kobra) due to a large tattoo of a cobra on his back, Ondrášek sports a host of other tattoos.

== Career statistics ==
=== Club ===
As of match played 8 December 2024

Appearances and goals by club, season and competition
Club	Season	League			National cup (Note: Includes Czech Cup, Norwegian Cup, Polish Cup, U.S. Open Cup)		Europe		Total	
Club	Season	Division	Apps	Goals	Apps	Goals	Apps	Goals	Apps	Goals
České Budějovice	2006–07	Czech First League	1	0	0	0	—		1	0
České Budějovice	2007–08	Czech First League	5	0	0	0	—		5	0
České Budějovice	2008–09	Czech First League	5	0	1	0	—		6	0
České Budějovice	2009–10	Czech First League	24	4	3	0	—		27	4
České Budějovice	2010–11	Czech First League	29	10	3	3	—		32	13
České Budějovice	2011–12	Czech First League	16	8	4	4	—		20	12
České Budějovice	Total		80	22	11	7	0	0	91	29
Čáslav (loan)	2008–09	Czech National Football League	14	4	0	0	—		14	4
Tromsø (loan)	2012	Tippeligaen	14	8	3	1	—		17	9
Tromsø	2012	Tippeligaen	15	6	3	2	6 (Note: Appearances in UEFA Europa League)	1	24	9
Tromsø	2013	Tippeligaen	29	8	4	1	13	3	46	12
Tromsø	2014	1. divisjon	25	15	1	0	—		26	15
Tromsø	2015	Tippeligaen	27	9	2	1	—		29	10
Tromsø	Total		110	46	13	5	19	4	142	55
Wisła Kraków	2015–16	Ekstraklasa	16	6	2	0	—		18	6
Wisła Kraków	2016–17	Ekstraklasa	24	3	2	0	—		26	3
Wisła Kraków	2017–18	Ekstraklasa	7	0	0	0	—		7	0
Wisła Kraków	2018–19	Ekstraklasa	19	11	1	1	—		20	12
Wisła Kraków	Total		66	20	5	1	0	0	71	21
Dallas	2019	Major League Soccer	18	7	2	0	—		20	7
Dallas	2020	Major League Soccer	5	2	0	0	—		5	2
Dallas	Total		23	9	2	0	0	0	25	9
Viktoria Plzeň	2020–21	Czech First League	31	6	3	0	2	1	36	7
FCSB	2021–22	Liga I	2	0	0	0	1 (Note: Appearance in UEFA Europa Conference League)	0	3	0
Tromsø	2021	Eliteserien	11	1	0	0	0	0	11	1
Wisła Kraków	2021–22	Ekstraklasa	14	2	0	0	—		14	2
Wisła Kraków	2022–23	I liga	1	0	0	0	—		1	0
Wisła Kraków	Total		15	2	0	0	—		15	2
České Budějovice	2023–24	Czech First League	27	6	0	0	—		27	6
České Budějovice	2024–25	Czech First League	14	0	1	0	—		15	0
České Budějovice	Total		41	6	1	0	0	0	42	6
Career total			393	116	34	13	22	5	449	134

=== International ===
As of 18 November 2021

Appearances and goals by national team and year
National team	Year	Apps	Goals
Czech Republic	2019	4	1
Czech Republic	2020	3	1
Total		7	2

Scores and results list Czech Republic's goal tally first, score column indicates score after each Ondrášek goal.

List of international goals scored by Zdeněk Ondrášek
No.	Date	Venue	Opponent	Score	Result	Competition
1	13 October 2019	Sinobo Stadium, Prague, Czech Republic	England	2–1	2–1	UEFA Euro 2020 qualification
2	18 November 2020	Doosan Arena, Plzeň, Czech Republic	Slovakia	2–0	2–0	2020–21 UEFA Nations League B

== Honours ==
Individual

- Tippeligaen top scorer: 2012 (14 goals)
- Ekstraklasa Player of the Month: August 2018
