= William Frantzen =

Norwegian footballer (born 1993)

Personal information
- Full name: William Johan Frantzen
- Date of birth: 13 June 1993 (age 33)
- Place of birth: Hammerfest, Norway
- Height: 1.82 m (5 ft 11 1/2 in)
- Position: Midfielder

Youth career
- Tromsø

Senior career*
Years	Team	Apps	(Gls)
2011–2017	Tromsø	24	(0)
- * Club domestic league appearances and goals as of 7 January 2018

William Johan Frantzen (born 13 June 1993) is a retired Norwegian footballer who played his entire senior career as a midfielder for Tromsø.

Frantzen was born in Hammerfest, but grew up in Honningsvåg in Nordkapp Municipality.

== Career statistics ==
As of 7 January 2018

Season	Club	Division	League		Cup		Europe		Total	
Season	Club	Division	Apps	Goals	Apps	Goals	Apps	Goals	Apps	Goals
2011	Tromsø	Tippeligaen	1	0	0	0	1	0	2	0
2012	Tromsø	Tippeligaen	1	0	2	1	0	0	3	1
2013	Tromsø	Tippeligaen	0	0	0	0	4	0	4	0
2014	Tromsø	1. divisjon	22	0	2	0	4	0	28	0
2015	Tromsø	Tippeligaen	0	0	0	0	-	-	0	0
2016	Tromsø	Tippeligaen	0	0	0	0	-	-	0	0
2017	Tromsø	Eliteserien	0	0	0	0	-	-	0	0
Career Total			24	0	4	1	9	0	37	1
