= Jonas Johansen =

Norwegian footballer (born 1985)

Personal information
- Full name: Jonas Johansen
- Date of birth: 22 March 1985 (age 41)
- Place of birth: Tromsø, Norway
- Height: 6 ft 1 in (1.85 m)
- Position: Midfielder

Youth career
- Tromsø

Senior career*
Years	Team	Apps	(Gls)
2002–2006	Tromsø	40	(2)
2005	→ Alta (loan)	15	(2)
2006–2008	Haugesund	40	(10)
2008–2010	Kongsvinger	52	(7)
2010–2014	Tromsdalen	88	(25)
2014–2017	Tromsø	59	(12)

International career
2006	Sápmi	3	(4)
- * Club domestic league appearances and goals

Jonas Johansen (born 22 March 1985) is a retired Norwegian footballer who signed for Tromsdalen in 2010, Johansen's strongest position is central defender but can also play in defence midfield and attacking midfield. In his career, he has played for the likes of Tromsø, Haugesund and Kongsvinger.

He took part in the 2006 VIVA World Cup in Occitania, representing Sápmi, who eventually went on to win the tournament.

He is the son of Trond Johansen.

== Career statistics ==
As of 29 May 2017

Season	Club	Division	League		Cup		Total	
Season	Club	Division	Apps	Goals	Apps	Goals	Apps	Goals
2002	Tromsø	Adeccoligaen	8	1	2	0	10	1
2003	Tromsø	Tippeligaen	7	1	4	0	11	1
2004	Tromsø	Tippeligaen	13	0	4	0	17	0
2005	Tromsø	Tippeligaen	10	0	2	1	12	1
2005	Alta	Adeccoligaen	15	2	1	0	16	2
2006	Tromsø	Tippeligaen	2	0	1	0	3	0
2006	Haugesund	Adeccoligaen	15	7	1	0	16	7
2007	Haugesund	Adeccoligaen	25	2	5	3	30	5
2008	Kongsvinger	Adeccoligaen	27	4	1	1	28	5
2009	Kongsvinger	Adeccoligaen	26	3	1	1	27	4
2010	Tromsdalen	Adeccoligaen	25	4	3	1	28	5
2011	Tromsdalen	2. divisjon	26	8	0	0	26	8
2012	Tromsdalen	Adeccoligaen	26	9	2	2	28	11
2013	Tromsdalen	2. divisjon	11	4	0	0	11	4
2014	Tromsø	1. divisjon	25	11	3	1	28	12
2015	Tromsø	Tippeligaen	18	1	2	0	20	1
2016	Tromsø	Tippeligaen	14	0	3	0	17	0
2017	Tromsø	Eliteserien	2	0	1	0	3	0
Career Total			295	57	36	10	331	67
