= Hans Norbye =

Norwegian footballer (born 1987)

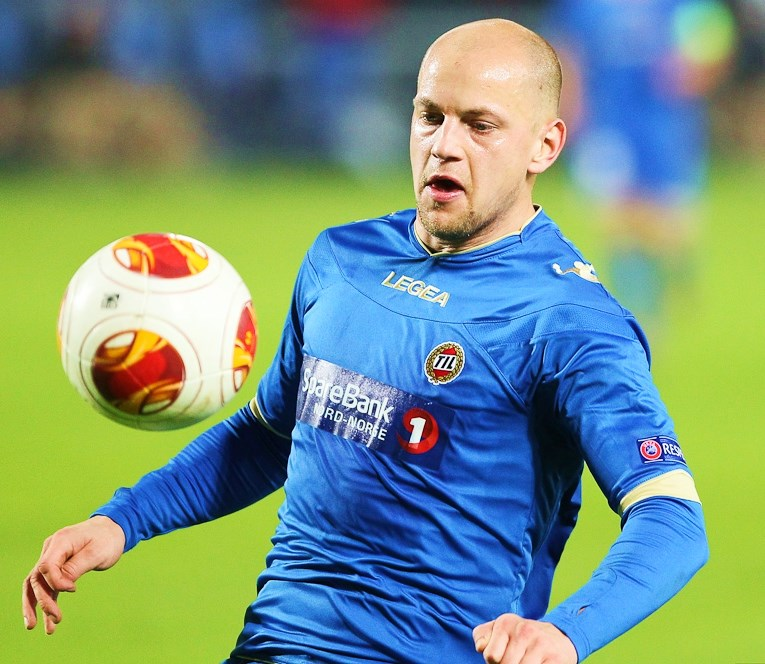
- Norbye in 2013

Personal information
- Full name: Hans Julius Eriksen Norbye
- Date of birth: 16 January 1987 (age 39)
- Place of birth: Karasjok, Norway
- Height: 1.76 m (5 ft 9 in)
- Position: Defender

Team information
- Current team: Alta
- Number: 20

Youth career
- Nordlys
- Tromsø

Senior career*
Years	Team	Apps	(Gls)
2006–2008	Tromsø	1	(0)
2006	→ Alta (loan)		
2007	→ Tromsdalen (loan)	8	(0)
2008	→ Tromsdalen (loan)	26	(1)
2009	Tromsdalen	20	(2)
2010–2018	Tromsø	164	(7)
2019–2020	HamKam	13	(0)
2020–	Alta	20	(0)

International career
2002–2003	Norway U16	5	(0)
2004	Norway U17	8	(0)
2005	Norway U18	2	(0)
- * Club domestic league appearances and goals as of 16 July 2021

Hans Julius Eriksen Norbye (born 16 January 1987) is a Norwegian footballer who currently plays for Alta.

== Career ==
Norbye was born and grew up in Karasjok. He was regarded as having talent for athletics during his younger days, but joined Tromsø IL to play youth football. He represented Norway internationally on youth level at the time. In 2006, he spent time on loan in Alta IF.

After the 2006 season, he signed his first professional contract with Tromsø IL. He got one game in the Norwegian Premier League in 2007.

He was loaned out to Tromsdalen UIL for one month in 2007, and later for the entire 2008 season. He then permanently joined Tromsdalen for free ahead of the 2009 season.

On 19 January 2019, Norbye signed with HamKam on a free transfer.

== Career statistics ==
=== Club ===
As of match played 11 July 2021

Appearances and goals by club, season and competition
Club	Season	League			National Cup		Continental		Total	
Club	Season	Division	Apps	Goals	Apps	Goals	Apps	Goals	Apps	Goals
Tromsø	2007	Eliteserien	1	0	0	0	-		1	0
Tromsø	Total		1	0	0	0	-	-	1	0
Tromsdalen (loan)	2007	1. divisjon	8	0	0	0	-		8	0
Tromsdalen (loan)	2008	2. divisjon	26	1	0	0	-		26	1
Tromsdalen	2009	1. divisjon	20	2	0	0	-		20	2
Tromsdalen	Total		54	3	0	0	-	-	54	3
Tromsø	2010	Eliteserien	0	0	2	0	-		2	0
Tromsø	2011	Eliteserien	16	0	2	0	4	0	22	0
Tromsø	2012	Eliteserien	28	4	6	0	4	0	38	4
Tromsø	2013	Eliteserien	23	0	4	0	9	0	36	0
Tromsø	2014	1. divisjon	24	2	2	0	4	1	30	3
Tromsø	2015	Eliteserien	21	0	1	0	-		22	0
Tromsø	2016	Eliteserien	26	0	4	1	-		30	1
Tromsø	2017	Eliteserien	23	1	4	0	-		27	1
Tromsø	2018	Eliteserien	3	0	2	0	-		5	0
Tromsø	Total		164	7	27	1	21	1	212	9
HamKam	2019	1. divisjon	13	0	2	0	-		15	0
HamKam	Total		13	0	2	0	-	-	15	0
Alta	2020	2. divisjon	15	0	0	0	-		15	0
Alta	2021	2. divisjon	5	0	0	0	-		5	0
Alta	Total		20	0	0	0	-	-	20	0
Career total			252	10	29	1	21	1	302	12
