= Henrik Gjesdal =

Norwegian footballer (born 1993)

Personal information
- Date of birth: 19 July 1993 (age 33)
- Place of birth: Bergen, Norway
- Height: 1.92 m (6 ft 3 1/2 in)
- Position: Centre back

Team information
- Current team: Moss
- Number: 4

Youth career
- –2006: Kringlebotn
- 2007–2013: Brann

Senior career*
Years	Team	Apps	(Gls)
2013–2014	Brann	18	(0)
2014	→ Nest-Sotra (loan)	14	(3)
2014–2017	Tromsø	28	(2)
2017–2019	Kristiansund	17	(1)
2020–2022	Start	3	(0)
2022	→ Kristiansund (loan)	8	(0)
2023–	Moss	18	(1)

International career^{‡}
2013	Norway U21	2	(0)
- * Club domestic league appearances and goals as of 13 June 2024 ‡ National team caps and goals as of 10 July 2013

Henrik Gjesdal (born 19 July 1993) is a Norwegian professional footballer and chess player who plays for Moss, as a centre back.

== Career ==
In April 2013 he signed his first contract with Brann, due after the 2013 season, after 7 years as a youth player. Gjesdal became a first team regular due to injuries on fellow centre backs Markus Jonsson and Simen Wangberg, and was called up to the national under-21 team. He debuted on 5 June as a substitute in a friendly match against Finland. On 3 October 2013 he signed a contract keeping him with Brann until the end of the 2015 season. Before the last game of the 2013 season against Tromsø, he was named Young Player of the Year by the supporters. Despite this, on 12 March 2014 it was announced that Gjesdal would leave on a four-month-long loan to 1. divisjon club Nest-Sotra.

In the summer 2014 Gjesdal signed a 2 1/2-year contract with Tromsø.

== Career statistics ==
As of 16 December 2019

Season	Club	Division	League		Cup		Total	
Season	Club	Division	Apps	Goals	Apps	Goals	Apps	Goals
2013	Brann	Tippeligaen	18	0	3	1	21	1
2014	Nest-Sotra	1. divisjon	14	3	2	0	16	3
2014	Tromsø	1. divisjon	12	0	0	0	12	0
2015	Tromsø	Tippeligaen	6	0	2	0	8	0
2016	Tromsø	Tippeligaen	9	1	4	0	13	1
2017	Kristiansund	Eliteserien	8	0	1	0	9	0
2018	Kristiansund	Eliteserien	2	0	0	0	2	0
2019	Kristiansund	Eliteserien	7	1	3	0	10	1
Career Total			78	5	15	1	93	6
