= 2021 Tromsø IL season =

Tromsø
2021 season
- Chairman: Helge Kræmer
- Manager: Gaute Helstrup
- Stadium: Alfheim Stadion
- Eliteserien: 12th
- Norwegian Cup: Second round
- Top goalscorer: League: August Mikkelsen; Ebiye Moses (8); All: August Mikkelsen (10)
Home colours	Away colours

The 2021 season was Tromsø IL's 101st season in existence and the club's first season return in the top flight of Norwegian football. In addition to the domestic league, Tromsø IL participated in this season's edition of the Norwegian Football Cup.

== Players ==
=== First team squad ===
As of 12 June 2021

Note: Flags indicate national team as defined under FIFA eligibility rules; some limited exceptions apply. Players may hold more than one non-FIFA nationality.

No.	Pos.	Nation	Player
1	GK	NOR	Jacob Karlstrøm
2	DF	ISL	Adam Örn Arnarson
3	MF	NOR	Jesper Robertsen
4	DF	NOR	Jostein Gundersen
5	DF	NOR	Anders Jenssen
6	DF	NOR	Isak Amundsen (on loan from FK Bodø/Glimt)
7	MF	DEN	Felix Winther
8	MF	NOR	Kent-Are Antonsen
9	FW	NOR	Runar Espejord (on loan from Heerenveen)
10	FW	NOR	Mikael Ingebrigtsen
11	MF	NOR	Ruben Yttergård Jenssen (Captain)
12	GK	CAN	Simon Thomas
13	FW	CZE	Zdeněk Ondrášek
14	MF	NOR	August Mikkelsen

No.	Pos.	Nation	Player
15	MF	NOR	Magnus Andersen
16	DF	NOR	Tomas Totland
17	FW	NOR	Daniel Berntsen
18	FW	NGR	Moses Ebiye
19	DF	DEN	Niklas Vesterlund
20	DF	NOR	Casper Øyvann
21	MF	NOR	Eric Kitolano
22	MF	NOR	Sakarias Opsahl (on loan from Vålerenga)
23	MF	NOR	Runar Norheim
25	MF	NOR	Lasse Nilsen
26	DF	NOR	Isak Vik
28	DF	FRA	Christophe Psyché
30	FW	NOR	Simen Henriksen
32	GK	NOR	Mats Trige

=== On loan ===
Note: Flags indicate national team as defined under FIFA eligibility rules; some limited exceptions apply. Players may hold more than one non-FIFA nationality.

No.	Pos.	Nation	Player
24	FW	NOR	Tobias Hafstad (on loan at Arendal until 31 December 2021)
34	MF	NOR	Tomas Stabell (on loan at Senja until 31 December 2021)

== Transfers ==
=== Winter ===
In: Note: Flags indicate national team as defined under FIFA eligibility rules; some limited exceptions apply. Players may hold more than one non-FIFA nationality.

No.	Pos.	Nation	Player
6	DF	NOR	Isak Helstad Amundsen (on loan from Bodø/Glimt)
7	MF	DEN	Felix Winther (from (Denmark) Fremad Amager)
12	GK	CAN	Simon Thomas (from Sarpsborg 08)
16	DF	NOR	Tomas Totland (from Sogndal)
18	FW	NGR	Moses Ebiye (from Hamkam)
19	DF	DEN	Niklas Vesterlund (from (Sweden) Trelleborg)
20	DF	NOR	Casper Øyvann (from Tromsdalen)
29	FW	DEN	Joachim Rothmann (on loan from (Denmark) Nordsjælland)
30	MF	NOR	Simen Henriksen (promoted from junior squad)

Out: Note: Flags indicate national team as defined under FIFA eligibility rules; some limited exceptions apply. Players may hold more than one non-FIFA nationality.

No.	Pos.	Nation	Player
6	MF	NOR	Lars Gunnar Johnsen (retired)
12	GK	NOR	Erlend Jacobsen (on loan to (Faroe Islands) B68)
16	FW	NOR	Sigurd Grønli (to Tromsdalen)
18	MF	NOR	Sakarias Opsahl (loan return to Vålerenga)
19	FW	NOR	Mohammed Ahamed (retired)
20	FW	NOR	Brage Berg Pedersen (to Kongsvinger, previously on loan at Øygarden)
22	DF	NOR	Simen Wangberg (to Stabæk)
26	DF	NOR	Steffen Skogvang Pedersen (to Tromsdalen)
29	DF	NOR	Erlend Sivertsen (loan return to Kristiansund)
32	DF	NOR	Runar Johansen (to Senja)
33	MF	NOR	Endre Borch Nash (released)
34	MF	NOR	Tomas Stabell (on loan to Senja, previously on loan at Fløya)
39	DF	NOR	Lars Sætra (to (Sweden) Kalmar)
–	MF	NOR	Gustav Severinsen (released, previously on loan at Florø)

=== Summer ===
In: Note: Flags indicate national team as defined under FIFA eligibility rules; some limited exceptions apply. Players may hold more than one non-FIFA nationality.

No.	Pos.	Nation	Player
13	FW	CZE	Zdeněk Ondrášek (from (Romania) FCSB)
22	MF	NOR	Sakarias Opsahl (on loan from Vålerenga, then made permanent)
26	DF	NOR	Isak Kjelsrud Vik (promoted from junior squad)
28	DF	FRA	Christophe Psyché (from (Cyprus) AEL Limassol)

Out: Note: Flags indicate national team as defined under FIFA eligibility rules; some limited exceptions apply. Players may hold more than one non-FIFA nationality.

No.	Pos.	Nation	Player
24	FW	NOR	Tobias Hafstad (on loan to Arendal)
29	FW	DEN	Joachim Rothmann (loan return to (Denmark) Nordsjælland)
–	GK	NOR	Erlend Jacobsen (to Brodd, previously on loan at (Faroe Islands) B68)

== Competitions ==
=== Eliteserien ===
==== Results summary ====
Overall								Home						Away					
Pld	W	D	L	GF	GA	GD	Pts	W	D	L	GF	GA	GD	W	D	L	GF	GA	GD
30	8	11	11	33	44	−11	35	3	6	6	16	21	−5	5	5	5	17	23	−6

Last updated: 12 December 2021.

==== Results by round ====
Round	1	2	3	4	5	6	7	8	9	10	11	12	13	14	15	16	17	18	19	20	21	22	23	24	25	26	27	28	29	30
Ground	A	H	A	H	A	H	A	H	A	H	A	A	H	A	H	A	H	A	H	A	H	A	H	H	A	H	A	H	A	H
Result	L	D	W	L	D	L	W	L	L	D	L	D	L	W	D	D	L	L	D	W	W	L	W	W	D	D	D	D	W	L
Position	15	13	10	13	13	15	11	13	15	14	14	14	14	13	13	13	13	13	13	13	13	13	13	12	11	11	11	12	12	12

A = Away; H = Home; W = Win; D = Draw; L = Loss

==== Results ====
9 May 2021 1	Bodø/Glimt	3–0	Tromsø	Bodø
18:00 CEST (UTC+2)	Botheim 8'; Saltnes 13'; Moe (yellow card) 49'; Nilsen 82' (o.g.)	Report	Gundersen (yellow card) 37'	Stadium: Aspmyra Stadion; Attendance: 600; Referee: Svein Oddvar Moen

13 May 2021 2	Tromsø	3–3	Molde	Tromsø
18:00 CEST (UTC+2)	Ebiye 11', 44'; E. Kitolano 64'; R. Y. Jenssen (yellow card) 86'	Report	Omoijuanfo 10', 16'; Pedersen (yellow card) 18'; Brynhildsen 40'; Risa (yellow card) 58'	Stadium: Alfheim Stadion; Attendance: 600; Referee: Sigurd Smehus Kringstad

16 May 2021 3	Viking	0–1	Tromsø	Stavanger
15:00 CEST (UTC+2)	Friðjónsson (yellow card) 28'; Vevatne (yellow card) 87'	Report	Totland 53'; Gundersen (yellow card) 79'	Stadium: Viking Stadion; Attendance: 600; Referee: Marius Hansen Grøtta

24 May 2021 4	Tromsø	1–3	Sandefjord	Tromsø
18:00 CEST (UTC+2)	Gundersen (yellow card) 36'; Berntsen (yellow card) 45'; Mikkelsen 49'; Totland (yellow card) 69'	Report	Moen Foss 13'; Wembangomo (yellow card) 37'; Jónsson 42'; Brenden (yellow card) 74'; Normann Hansen 81'	Stadium: Alfheim Stadion; Attendance: 600; Referee: Mohammad Usman Aslam

27 May 2021 5	Strømsgodset	1–1	Tromsø	Drammen
18:00 CEST (UTC+2)	Stenevik (yellow card) 17'; Hove 72'; Enersen (yellow card) 89'	Report	E. Kitolano 38'; Nilsen (yellow card) 61'; Winther (yellow card) 84'	Stadium: Marienlyst Stadion; Attendance: 200; Referee: Sivert Øksnes Amland

30 May 2021 6	Tromsø	0–2	Sarpsborg 08	Tromsø
18:00 CEST (UTC+2)	R. Y. Jenssen (yellow card) 10'; A. Jenssen (red card) 11'	Report	Koné 12' (pen.); Lindseth 24'; Utvik (yellow card) 40'; Thomassen (yellow card) 49'; Halvorsen (yellow card) 69'; Kristiansen (yellow card) 90+3'	Stadium: Alfheim Stadion; Attendance: 600; Referee: Marius Hansen Grøtta

14 June 2021 7	Stabæk	0–3	Tromsø	Bærum
19:00 CEST (UTC+2)	Khoblenko (yellow card) 79'	Report	Ebiye 9', 14'; Totland 90'	Stadium: Nadderud Stadion; Attendance: 600; Referee: Sigurd Smehus Kringstad

20 June 2021 8	Tromsø	1–2	Lillestrøm	Tromsø
18:00 CEST (UTC+2)	Mikkelsen 26'	Report	Lehne Olsen 2', 52'; Ranger (yellow card) 24'	Stadium: Alfheim Stadion; Attendance: 2,000; Referee: Mohammad Usman Aslam

24 June 2021 9	Odd	3–0	Tromsø	Skien
18:00 CEST (UTC+2)	Bakenga 32', 77' (yellow card) 84'; J. Kitolano 54'; Svendsen (yellow card) 86'	Report	Arnarson (yellow card) 5'; Berntsen (yellow card) 45+1'; Jenssen (yellow card) 85'	Stadium: Skagerak Arena; Attendance: 1,749; Referee: Sivert Øksnes Amland

30 June 2021 10	Tromsø	0–0	Kristiansund	Tromsø
18:00 CEST (UTC+2)		Report	Pemi (yellow card) 58'	Stadium: Alfheim Stadion; Attendance: 1,574; Referee: Rohit Saggi

4 July 2023 11	Haugesund	3–0	Tromsø	Haugesund
18:00 CEST (UTC+2)	Ndour 30'; Therkildsen 69'; Liseth 78'	Report	Opsahl (yellow card) 11'; Øyvann (yellow card) 90'	Stadium: Haugesund Stadion; Attendance: 2,000; Referee: Kai Erik Steen

10 July 2021 12	Brann	1–1	Tromsø	Bergen
20:00 CEST (UTC+2)	Rasmussen (yellow card) 39'; Bamba 45+1' (yellow card) 85'; Sané (yellow card) 90+9'	Report	Antonsen 18' (yellow card) 90+1'; Totland (yellow card) 79'; Karlstrøm (yellow card) 82'	Stadium: Brann Stadion; Attendance: 3,645; Referee: Mohammad Usman Aslam

18 July 2021 13	Tromsø	1–3	Rosenborg	Tromsø
18:00 CEST (UTC+2)	Totland 29'	Report	Islamović 35'; Holse 69'; Tagseth 80'	Stadium: Alfheim Stadion; Attendance: 2,000; Referee: Espen Eskås

8 August 2021 14	Mjøndalen	2–3	Tromsø	Mjøndalen
18:00 CEST (UTC+2)	Walstad 59'; Eriksen 65'; Sporrong (yellow card) 71'	Report	E. Kitolano (yellow card) 14'; Totland 23'; Mikkelsen 46'; Nilsen (yellow card) 68'; A. Jenssen 90+1'	Stadium: Consto Arena; Attendance: 1,350; Referee: Svein Oddvar Moen

15 August 2021 15	Tromsø	1–1	Vålerenga	Tromsø
18:00 CEST (UTC+2)	Helstad Amundsen (yellow card) 55'; Mikkelsen (yellow card) 56'; Moses 65'; Gundersen (yellow card) 90+1'	Report	Zuta (yellow card) 41'; Bjørdal 75'; Mörfelt (yellow card) 90+3'	Stadium: Alfheim Stadion; Attendance: 1,820; Referee: Marius Hansen Grøtta

22 August 2021 16	Sandefjord	1–1	Tromsø	Sandefjord
18:00 CEST (UTC+2)	Jónsson 12'; Wembangomo (yellow card) 80'; Gussiås (penalty missed) 88'	Report	Ebiye 17'; Amundsen (yellow card) 41'; A. Jenssen (yellow card) 89'	Stadium: Release Arena; Attendance: 2,000; Referee: Sigurd Smestad Kringstad

29 August 2021 17	Tromsø	2–3	Bodø/Glimt	Tromsø
18:00 CEST (UTC+2)	E. Kitolano 49'; Amundsen 61'; Antonsen (yellow card) 63'; Gundersen (yellow card) 85'	Report	Pellegrino 57' (yellow card) 59'; Saltnes 63', 88'; Konradsen (yellow card) 90'	Stadium: Alfheim Stadion; Attendance: 2,000; Referee: Dag Vidar Hafsås

12 September 2021 18	Rosenborg	3–2	Tromsø	Trondheim
20:00 CEST (UTC+2)	Holm 21'; Ceïde 25'; Tettey (yellow card) 40'; Eyjólfsson (yellow card) 84'; Vecchia 90+4'	Report	Totland 36'; Ondrášek 51'; R. Y. Jenssen (yellow card) 74'; Gundersen (yellow card) 81'	Stadium: Lerkendal Stadion; Attendance: 6,688; Referee: Tore Hansen

19 September 2021 19	Tromsø	1–1	Brann	Tromsø
20:00 CEST (UTC+2)	Vesterlund 18'; Psyché (yellow card) 60'	Report	Knudsen (yellow card) 56' (yellow-red card) 88'; Sery Larsen 70'; Heltne Nilsen (yellow card) 84'	Stadium: Alfheim Stadion; Attendance: 1,988; Referee: Svein Oddvar Moen

25 September 2021 20	Lillestrøm	1–2	Tromsø	Lillestrøm
18:00 CEST (UTC+2)	Ogbu (yellow card) 68'; Lehne Olsen 90+1' (pen.)	Report	Vesterlund 27' (yellow card) 77'; Mikkelsen 62'; Psyché (yellow card) 71'	Stadium: Åråsen Stadion; Attendance: 4,189; Referee: Rohit Saggi

3 October 2021 21	Tromsø	2–0	Haugesund	Tromsø
18:00 CEST (UTC+2)	Stølås 28' (o.g.); Mikkelsen 33'; Vesterlund (yellow card) 90+1'	Report	Therkildsen (yellow card) 39'; Naustdal (yellow card) 85'	Stadium: Alfheim Stadion; Attendance: 2,981; Referee: Tommy Skjerven

16 October 2021 22	Molde	3–0	Tromsø	Molde
18:00 CEST (UTC+2)	Haugen 34'; Ellingsen (yellow card) 57'; Brynhildsen 79'; Bjørnbak 83'	Report		Stadium: Aker Stadion; Attendance: 6,796; Referee: Svein Oddvar Moen

24 October 2021 23	Tromsø	1–0	Mjøndalen	Tromsø
17:00 CEST (UTC+2)	E. Kitolano 11'	Report	Skistad (yellow card) 38'	Stadium: Alfheim Stadion; Attendance: 2,201; Referee: Espen Eskås

27 October 2021 24	Tromsø	2–0	Odd	Tromsø
18:00 CEST (UTC+2)	Mikkelsen 52'; Ebiye 83'	Report	J. Kitolano (yellow card) 85'	Stadium: Alfheim Stadion; Attendance: 1,990; Referee: Christian Moen

30 October 2021 25	Kristiansund	1–1	Tromsø	Kristiansund
16:00 CEST (UTC+2)	Kalludra 17' (yellow card) 67'; Ulvestad (yellow card) 73'; Isaksen (yellow card) 76'	Report	Mikkelsen 36'	Stadium: Kristiansund Stadion; Attendance: 3,841; Referee: Mohammad Usman Aslam

7 November 2021 26	Tromsø	1–1	Strømsgodset	Tromsø
17:00 CET (UTC+1)	E. Kitolano (yellow card) 36'; Ebiye 83'	Report	Hove 62'	Stadium: Alfheim Stadion; Attendance: 2,040; Referee: Marius Hansen Grøtta

21 November 2021 27	Vålerenga	1–1	Tromsø	Oslo
17:00 CET (UTC+1)	Oldrup Jensen 52'	Report	Psyché (yellow card) 14'; Helstad Amundsen (yellow card) 66'; Gundersen (yellow card) 77'; Arnarson 81'	Stadium: Intility Arena; Attendance: 4,822; Referee: Sigurd Smehus Kringstad

28 November 2021 28	Tromsø	0–0	Stabæk	Tromsø
17:00 CET (UTC+1)	Totland (yellow card) 76'	Report	Mesík (yellow card) 67'	Stadium: Alfheim Stadion; Attendance: 1,715; Referee: Tore Hansen

5 December 2021 29	Sarpsborg 08	0–1	Tromsø	Sarpsborg
17:00 CET (UTC+1)	Maigaard (yellow card) 62'; Muhammed (yellow card) 70'; Kristiansen (yellow card) 90+3'	Report	Mikkelsen 33'; E. Kitolano (yellow card) 43'; Jenssen (yellow card) 90+1'	Stadium: Sarpsborg Stadion; Attendance: 4,411; Referee: Kai Erik Steen

12 December 2021 30	Tromsø	0–2	Viking	Tromsø
17:00 CET (UTC+1)		Report	Løkberg 38' (yellow card) 45'; Brekalo 47'	Stadium: Alfheim Stadion; Attendance: 2,412; Referee: Mohammad Usman Aslam

==== Table ====
Pos	Team	Pld	W	D	L	GF	GA	GD	Pts	Qualification or relegation
10	Sandefjord	30	10	6	14	38	52	−14	36	
11	Haugesund	30	9	8	13	46	45	+1	35	
12	Tromsø	30	8	11	11	33	44	−11	35	
13	Odd	30	8	9	13	44	58	−14	33	
14	Brann (R)	30	5	11	14	38	55	−17	26	Qualification for the relegation play-offs

Source: Football Association of Norway (in Norwegian)
Rules for classification: 1) Points; 2) Goal difference; 3) Goals scored; 4) Head-to-head points; 5) Head-to-head goal difference; 6) Head-to-head away goals scored (only if between two teams); 7) Head-to-head goals scored; 8) Play-off (only used to decide champions or relegation).
(R) Relegated

=== Norwegian Cup ===
24 July 2021 First round	Skånland	0–11	Tromsø	Skånland
15:00 CEST (UTC+2)	Hustad (yellow card) 49'	Report	Ebiye 20'; Antonsen 25'; Mikkelsen 27', 47'; Vesterlund 41'; A. Jenssen 59'; Gundersen 64'; Rothmann 66', 81'; Ingebrigtsen 78', 83'; Nilsen (yellow card) 87'	Stadium: Skånland Kunstgress; Attendance: 400; Referee: Kristian Kristiansen

1 August 2021 Second round	Alta	3–1	Tromsø	Alta
14:00 CEST (UTC+2)	C. Reginiussen 16', 82' el Ghaouti 28'; Nome (yellow card) 43'; Overvik (yellow card) 77'; Reginiussen (yellow card) 90+4'	Report	Antonsen 45+2'	Stadium: SmartDok Arena; Referee: Ole-Alexander Ekeli Valen
