= 2019 Tromsø IL season =

Tromsø
2019 season
- Chairman: Bjørn Nilsen
- Manager: Simo Valakari
- Stadium: Alfheim Stadion
- Eliteserien: 15th
- Norwegian Cup: Third Round vs Kongsvinger
- Top goalscorer: League: Onni Valakari (7); All: Onni Valakari (7)
Home colours	Away colours

The 2019 season was Tromsø's fifth season in the Tippeligaen following their relegation at the end of the 2013 and their 32nd season in the top flight of Norwegian football. Tromsø finished the season in 15th position, earning relegation back to the 1. divisjon, whilst also reaching the Third Round of the Norwegian Cup where they were knocked out by Kongsvinger.

== Squad ==
Note: Flags indicate national team as defined under FIFA eligibility rules; some limited exceptions apply. Players may hold more than one non-FIFA nationality.

No.	Pos.	Nation	Player
1	GK	NOR	Gudmund Taksdal Kongshavn
2	DF	RUS	Artem Sokol (on loan from Arsenal Tula)
3	MF	NOR	Kent-Are Antonsen
5	DF	NOR	Anders Jenssen
6	DF	FIN	Juha Pirinen
7	MF	NOR	Morten Gamst Pedersen
8	MF	DEN	Oliver Kjærgaard
9	FW	CRC	Brayan Rojas (on loan from Carmelita)
10	MF	NOR	Mikael Ingebrigtsen
11	MF	FIN	Robert Taylor
14	MF	NOR	August Mikkelsen
15	MF	NOR	Magnus Andersen
16	FW	NOR	Sigurd Grønli
17	FW	NOR	Daniel Berntsen

No.	Pos.	Nation	Player
18	MF	FIN	Onni Valakari
19	MF	NOR	Marcus Holmgren Pedersen
20	MF	ENG	Aidan Barlow (on loan from Manchester United)
22	DF	NOR	Simen Wangberg (Captain)
23	MF	SWE	Eric Smith (on loan from Gent)
25	MF	NOR	Lasse Nilsen
26	DF	NOR	Jostein Gundersen
28	GK	NOR	Jacob Karlstrom
30	FW	NOR	Runar Espejord
31	GK	NOR	Erlend Jacobsen
34	MF	NOR	Tomas Stabell
36	FW	NOR	Bryan Fiabema
77	FW	NOR	Fitim Azemi (on loan from Vålerenga)

=== Out on loan ===
Note: Flags indicate national team as defined under FIFA eligibility rules; some limited exceptions apply. Players may hold more than one non-FIFA nationality.

No. / Pos. / Nation / Player; 33 / MF / NOR / Gustav Severinsen (at Alta)	No. / Pos. / Nation / Player; 42 / FW / NOR / Mushaga Bakenga (at Ranheim)

== Transfers ==
=== Winter ===
In: Note: Flags indicate national team as defined under FIFA eligibility rules; some limited exceptions apply. Players may hold more than one non-FIFA nationality.

No.	Pos.	Nation	Player
5	DF	NOR	Anders Jenssen (from (Norway) Tromsdalen)
6	DF	FIN	Juha Pirinen (from (Finland) HJK)
8	MF	DEN	Oliver Kjærgaard (loan return from (Norway) Nest-Sotra)
14	MF	NOR	August Mikkelsen (loan return from (Norway) Tromsdalen)

Out: Note: Flags indicate national team as defined under FIFA eligibility rules; some limited exceptions apply. Players may hold more than one non-FIFA nationality.

No.	Pos.	Nation	Player
2	DF	NOR	Tom Høgli (retired)
6	MF	NOR	Christian Landu Landu (to (Norway) Sandnes Ulf)
9	FW	SVN	Slobodan Vuk (to (Slovenia) Domžale, previously on loan)
14	DF	NOR	Hans Norbye (to (Norway) Hamkam)
23	MF	NOR	Gjermund Åsen (to (Norway) Rosenborg)
—	MF	NOR	Henrik Johnsgård (on loan to (Norway) Senja, previously on loan to (Norway) Tromsdalen)
—		SEN	Mehdi Dioury (to (Senegal) Diambars, previously on loan to (Norway) Tromsdalen)
—	FW	NOR	Brage Berg Pedersen (on loan to (Norway) Alta)
—		NOR	Gustav Severinsen (on loan to (Norway) Alta)

=== Summer ===
In: Note: Flags indicate national team as defined under FIFA eligibility rules; some limited exceptions apply. Players may hold more than one non-FIFA nationality.

No.	Pos.	Nation	Player
20	MF	ENG	Aidan Barlow (on loan from (England) Manchester United U23)
23	MF	SWE	Eric Smith (on loan from (Belgium) Gent)
34	MF	NOR	Tomas Stabell (promoted from junior squad)
77	FW	NOR	Fitim Azemi (on loan from (Norway) Vålerenga)

Out: Note: Flags indicate national team as defined under FIFA eligibility rules; some limited exceptions apply. Players may hold more than one non-FIFA nationality.

No.	Pos.	Nation	Player
42	FW	NOR	Mushaga Bakenga (on loan to (Norway) Ranheim)

== Competitions ==
=== Eliteserien ===
==== Results summary ====
Overall								Home						Away					
Pld	W	D	L	GF	GA	GD	Pts	W	D	L	GF	GA	GD	W	D	L	GF	GA	GD
31	8	6	17	39	58	−19	30	5	5	6	23	18	+5	3	1	11	16	40	−24

Last updated: 1 December 2019.
Source: see below

==== Results by round ====
Round	1	2	3	4	5	6	7	8	9	10	11	12	13	14	15	16	17	18	19	20	21	22	23	24	25	26	27	28	29	30
Ground	A	H	A	A	H	A	H	H	A	H	A	H	A	H	A	H	A	H	A	H	A	H	A	H	A	H	A	H	A	H
Result	W	L	L	D	L	L	L	L	L	W	W	W	L	W	L	D	L	D	W	D	L	L	L	W	L	W	L	D	L	D
Position	6	9	13	12	15	16	16	16	16	16	14	11	12	10	13	13	14	14	11	11	11	13	13	12	12	12	13	12	14	15

Updated to match(es) played on 1 December 2019. Source: see below
A = Away; H = Home; W = Win; D = Draw; L = Loss

==== Results ====
31 March 2019 1	Ranheim	1–2	Tromsø	Trondheim
18:00 CEST (UTC+2)	López 19'; Kvande (yellow card) 42'	Report	Berntsen (yellow card) 39'; Sokol (yellow card) 51'; Ingebrigtsen 69'; Valakari 90+2'	Stadium: EXTRA Arena; Attendance: 1,694; Referee: Trygve Kjensli

7 April 2019 2	Tromsø	0–2	Viking	Tromsø
18:00 CEST (UTC+2)	Jenssen (yellow card) 45+2'; Antonsen (yellow card) 89'; Nilsen (yellow card) 90+5'	Report	Thorstvedt 8', 90+7'; Tripić (yellow card) 51'; Høiland (yellow card) 71'; Vikstøl (yellow card) 76'	Stadium: Alfheim Stadion; Attendance: 2,888; Referee: Kristoffer Hagenes

14 April 2019 3	Vålerenga	4–1	Tromsø	Oslo
20:00 CEST (UTC+2)	Finne 13'; Adekugbe (yellow card) 22'; Wangberg 30' (o.g.); Ejuke 60'; Shala 75'	Report	Bjørdal 71' (o.g.)	Stadium: Intility Arena; Attendance: 5,719; Referee: Svein Oddvar Moen

22 April 2019 4	Mjøndalen	1–1	Tromsø	Mjøndalen
18:00 CEST (UTC+2)	Brochmann 11' (pen.); Scriven (yellow card) 70'	Report	Jenssen (yellow card) 15'; Valakari 54'	Stadium: Consto Arena; Attendance: 2,058; Referee: Espen Eskås

28 April 2019 5	Tromsø	1–2	Brann	Tromsø
18:00 CEST (UTC+2)	Pirinen (yellow card) 31'; Espejord 66'	Report	Løkberg 52'; Wormgoor 71' (pen.)	Stadium: Alfheim Stadion; Attendance: 3,137; Referee: Tommy Skjerven

5 May 2019 6	Kristiansund	1–0	Tromsø	Kristiansund
18:00 CEST (UTC+2)	Aasbak (yellow card) 53'; Olsen 90+6'	Report	Wangberg (yellow card) 30'; Jenssen (yellow card) 82'; Ma.Pedersen (red card) 87'	Stadium: Kristiansund Stadion; Attendance: 3,852; Referee: Kristoffer Hagenes

12 May 2019 7	Tromsø	1–2	Odds	Tromsø
18:00 CEST (UTC+2)	Espejord 41'	Report	Kitolano 75'; Børven 84'; Sødlund (yellow card) 90+5'	Stadium: Alfheim Stadion; Attendance: 2,514; Referee: Dag Vidar Hafsås

16 May 2019 8	Tromsø	1–2	Bodø/Glimt	Tromsø
18:00 CEST (UTC+2)	Pirinen 9'; Valakari (yellow card) 19'; Grønli (yellow card) 31'; Bakenga (yellow card) 87'	Report	Moberg (yellow card) 18'; Layouni 69' (pen.); Bjørkan (yellow card) 81'; Evjen 90+1'; Reitan (yellow card) 90+3'	Stadium: Alfheim Stadion; Attendance: 4,368; Referee: Ola Hobber Nilsen

19 May 2019 9	Strømsgodset	3–1	Tromsø	Drammen
18:00 CEST (UTC+2)	Sylla 25'; Ovenstad 47' (yellow card) 55'; Ringstad (yellow card) 89'; Pedersen (yellow card) 90+1'; Hove 90+5'	Report	Antonsen 23'	Stadium: Marienlyst Stadion; Attendance: 4,628; Referee: Trygve Kjensli

26 May 2019 10	Tromsø	2–1	Molde	Tromsø
18:00 CEST (UTC+2)	Andersen 1'; Taylor 47'; Kongshavn (yellow card) 54'; Ingebrigtsen (red card)	Report	Omoijuanfo (penalty missed) 52'; Bjørnbak (yellow card) 59'; E.Hestad (yellow card) 69'; Gabrielsen 90+4'	Stadium: Alfheim Stadion; Attendance: 2,779; Referee: Trond Ivar Døvle

17 June 2019 11	Stabæk	0–1	Tromsø	Bærum
19:00 CEST (UTC+2)	Aga (yellow card) 45+1'; Kassi (penalty missed) 86'	Report	Pirinen (yellow card) 38'; Taylor 76'	Stadium: Nadderud Stadion; Attendance: 3,682; Referee: Svein Oddvar Moen

23 June 2019 12	Tromsø	1–0	Rosenborg	Tromsø
18:00 CEST (UTC+2)	Wangberg 65'; Andersen (yellow card) 74'; Pedersen (yellow card) 90'	Report	Hovland (yellow card) 50'; Søderlund (yellow card) 89'	Stadium: Alfheim Stadion; Attendance: 4,501; Referee: Tommy Skjerven

30 June 2019 13	Lillestrøm	4–0	Tromsø	Lillestrøm
18:00 CEST (UTC+2)	Salquist 15'; Melgalvis 23' (yellow card) 64'; Gustavsson (yellow card) 48' (goal) 65'; Krogstad (yellow card) 67'; Ødemarksbakken 78'	Report	Berntsen (yellow card) 66'	Stadium: Åråsen Stadion; Attendance: 5,108; Referee: Espen Eskås

5 July 2019 14	Tromsø	2–0	Sarpsborg 08	Tromsø
19:00 CEST (UTC+2)	Andersen 17'; Valakari 53'; Pedersen (yellow card) 57'; Jenssen (yellow card) 73'	Report	Skålevik (yellow card) 25'; Zachariassen (yellow card) 30'; Lindseth (yellow card) 74'	Stadium: Alfheim Stadion; Attendance: 2,982; Referee: Kristoffer Hagenes

14 July 2019 15	Haugesund	5–1	Tromsø	Haugesund
18:00 CEST (UTC+2)	Koné 31', 86'; Hansen 39'; Karlstrøm 45+2' (o.g.); Kallevåg 63'	Report	Taylor 37'; Antonsen (yellow card) 38'; Valakari (yellow card) 41'; Pirinen (yellow card) 42'	Stadium: Haugesund Stadion; Attendance: 3,421; Referee: Trygve Kjensli

4 August 2019 16	Tromsø	2–2	Mjøndalen	Tromsø
18:00 CEST (UTC+2)	Valakari 37'; Azemi 51'	Report	Gauseth 54'; Liseth 67'	Stadium: Alfheim Stadion; Attendance: 3,101; Referee: Dag Vidar Hafsås

10 August 2019 17	Rosenborg	5–2	Tromsø	Trondheim
15:30 CEST (UTC+2)	Botheim 11', 42', 64'; Valsvik 20'; Åsen 79'	Report	Antonsen (yellow card) 31'; Taylor (penalty missed) 39' 39'; Nilsen (yellow card) 49'; Pedersen 66' (yellow card) 69'	Stadium: Lerkendal Stadion; Attendance: 12,869; Referee: Tore Hansen

18 August 2019 18	Tromsø	1–1	Lillestrøm	Tromsø
18:00 CEST (UTC+2)	Wangberg (yellow card) 10' (goal) 78'; Taylor (yellow card) 74'	Report	Smárason 11' (pen.); Krogstad (yellow card) 23'; Salquist (yellow card) 59'; Ødemarksbakken (yellow card) 79'	Stadium: Alfheim Stadion; Attendance: 3,409; Referee: Rohit Saggi

25 August 2019 19	Brann	2–3	Tromsø	Bergen
18:00 CEST (UTC+2)	Bamba 22'; Jenssen (yellow card) 39'; Berisha (yellow card) 74'; Karadas 89'	Report	Kongshavn (yellow card) 11'; Wormgoor 40' (o.g.); Valakari 56'; Sokol (yellow card) 74'; Azemi 76'	Stadium: Brann Stadion; Attendance: 10,314; Referee: Tommy Skjerven

1 September 2019 20	Tromsø	2–2	Haugesund	Tromsø
18:00 CEST (UTC+2)	Azemi 7'; Barlow 46' (yellow card) 69'; Taylor (yellow card) 60'; Kongshavn (yellow card) 61'	Report	Krygård 58'; Grindheim 70'	Stadium: Alfheim Stadion; Attendance: 3,245; Referee: Trond Ivar Døvle

15 September 2019 21	Molde	3–0	Tromsø	Molde
18:00 CEST (UTC+2)	Eikrem (yellow card) 37'; James 45'; Bolly 68'; Hussain 84'	Report	Nilsen (yellow card) 82'	Stadium: Aker Stadion; Attendance: 5,952; Referee: Sigurd Smehus Kringstad

22 September 2019 22	Tromsø	0–1	Strømsgodset	Tromsø
18:00 CEST (UTC+2)	Valakari (yellow card) 61'; Antonsen (yellow card) 84'	Report	Salvesen (yellow card) 28'; Maigaard 86'; Vilsvik (yellow card) 90+4'	Stadium: Alfheim Stadion; Attendance: 2,943; Referee: Kai Erik Steen

29 September 2019 23	Bodø/Glimt	4–0	Tromsø	Bodø
20:00 CEST (UTC+2)	Zinckernagel 2', 64'; Evjen 23'; Moberg 60'	Report	Kongshavn (yellow card) 37'; Taylor (yellow card) 39'	Stadium: Aspmyra Stadion; Attendance: 4,248; Referee: Espen Eskås

6 October 2019 24	Tromsø	5–0	Kristiansund	Tromsø
18:00 CEST (UTC+2)	Azemi 4', 25'; Smith (yellow card) 17'; Nilsen 38'; Jenssen 48'; Wangberg (yellow card) 57'; Espejord 76'	Report	Diop (yellow card) 45'; Psyché (yellow card) 54'; Isaksen (red card) 57'	Stadium: Alfheim Stadion; Attendance: 2,717; Referee: Ola Hobber Nilsen

20 October 2019 25	Viking	2–1	Tromsø	Stavanger
18:00 CEST (UTC+2)	Friðjónsson 26' (yellow card) 27'; Tripić (yellow card) 73'; Torsteinbø 89'; Austbø (yellow card) 90+3'	Report	Antonsen (yellow card) 22'; Wangberg (yellow card) 73'; Gundersen 90+3'; Jenssen (yellow card) 90+5'	Stadium: Viking Stadion; Attendance: 8,212; Referee: Rohit Saggi

27 October 2019 26	Tromsø	4–2	Ranheim	Tromsø
18:00 CET (UTC+1)	Pirinen 23'; Valakari 44'; Andersen 49'; Espejord 55'; Gundersen (yellow card) 86'	Report	Heggem (yellow card) 16'; Reginiussen (yellow card) 29'; Foosnæs 45+2'; Gundersen 67' (o.g.); Kvande (yellow card) 89'	Stadium: Alfheim Stadion; Attendance: 3,002; Referee: Kristoffer Hagenes

3 November 2019 27	Sarpsborg 08	3–2	Tromsø	Sarpsborg
18:00 CET (UTC+1)	Lafferty (yellow card) 25'; Zachariassen 30'; Utvik 51'; Halvorsen 53'	Report	Valakari 13' (yellow card) 53'; Barlow 86'	Stadium: Sarpsborg Stadion; Attendance: 6,267; Referee: Espen Eskås

10 November 2019 28	Tromsø	0–0	Vålerenga	Tromsø
18:00 CET (UTC+1)	Jenssen (yellow card) 60'	Report		Stadium: Alfheim Stadion; Attendance: 2,575; Referee: Dag Vidar Hafsås

24 November 2019 29	Odd	2–1	Tromsø	Skien
18:00 CET (UTC+1)	Børven 43'; Jensen 60'; Ruud (yellow card) 79'; Hoff (yellow card) 82'; Nordkvelle (yellow card) 90+3'	Report	Wangberg (yellow card) 14'; Antonsen (yellow card) 53'; Valakari (penalty missed) 80'; Andersen 80'	Stadium: Skagerak Arena; Attendance: 5,478; Referee: Espen Eskås

1 December 2019 30	Tromsø	1–1	Stabæk	Tromsø
18:00 CET (UTC+1)	Smith (yellow card) 27'; Espejord 47'	Report	Bohinen (yellow card) 36'; Edvardsen 39'; Askildsen (yellow card) 82'	Stadium: Alfheim Stadion; Attendance: 5,522; Referee: Tore Hansen

==== Table ====
Pos	Team	Pld	W	D	L	GF	GA	GD	Pts	Qualification or relegation
12	Sarpsborg 08	30	5	15	10	30	40	−10	30	
13	Mjøndalen	30	6	12	12	38	52	−14	30	
14	Lillestrøm (R)	30	7	9	14	32	47	−15	30	Qualification for the relegation play-offs
15	Tromsø (R)	30	8	6	16	39	58	−19	30	Relegation to First Division
16	Ranheim (R)	30	7	6	17	36	55	−19	27	Relegation to First Division

Source: Football Association of Norway (in Norwegian), Soccerway
Rules for classification: 1) Points; 2) Goal difference; 3) Goals scored; 4) Head-to-head points; 5) Head-to-head goal difference; 6) Head-to-head away goals scored (only if between two teams); 7) Head-to-head goals scored; 8) Play-off (only used to decide champions or relegation).
(R) Relegated

=== Norwegian Cup ===
1 May 2019 First Round	Norild	1–8	Tromsø	Vadsø
18:00 CEST (UTC+2)	Stavseth 16'; U.Vucenovic (yellow card) 56'	Report	Nilsen 5'; Rushfeldt 13' (o.g.); Rojas 16'; Kjærgaard 18', 23', 30' (yellow card) 61'; Grønli 34' (pen.); Ingebrigtsen 53'; Valakari (yellow card) 75'	Stadium: Vadsø Stadion; Attendance: 800; Referee: Ola Kellerhals

22 May 2019 Second Round	Melbo	1–2	Tromsø	Melbu
18:00 CEST (UTC+2)	Karlsen 20'; E.Pettersen (yellow card) 87'; E.Robertsen (yellow card) 90+4'; P.Aas (yellow card) 90+4'	Report	Stabell (yellow card) 51'; Rojas 57'; Mikkelsen 76'	Stadium: Havfisk Stadion; Attendance: 1,381; Referee: Ali Al-Hatem

20 June 2019 Third Round	Kongsvinger	1–0	Tromsø	Kongsvinger
18:00 CEST (UTC+2)	Güven 53'; C.Røer (yellow card) 64'; M.Vinjor (yellow card) 87'	Report	Antonsen (yellow card) 90+1'	Stadium: Gjemselund Stadion; Attendance: 1,269; Referee: Marius Lien

== Squad statistics ==
As of match played 1 December 2019

=== Appearances and goals ===
No.	Pos	Nat	Player	Total		Eliteserien		Norwegian Cup	
No.	Pos	Nat	Player	Apps	Goals	Apps	Goals	Apps	Goals
1	GK	(Norway) NOR	Gudmund Taksdal Kongshavn	17	0	16	0	1	0
2	DF	(Russia) RUS	Artyom Sokol	10	0	4+5	0	1	0
3	MF	(Norway) NOR	Kent-Are Antonsen	28	1	26+1	1	1	0
5	DF	(Norway) NOR	Anders Jenssen	22	1	19	1	3	0
6	DF	(Finland) FIN	Juha Pirinen	29	2	24+2	2	3	0
7	MF	(Norway) NOR	Morten Gamst Pedersen	32	1	26+3	1	2+1	0
8	MF	(Denmark) DEN	Oliver Kjærgaard	4	3	0+2	0	2	3
9	FW	(Costa Rica) CRC	Brayan Rojas	12	2	2+7	0	2+1	2
10	MF	(Norway) NOR	Mikael Ingebrigtsen	12	2	6+4	1	1+1	1
11	MF	(Finland) FIN	Robert Taylor	31	4	27+1	4	3	0
14	MF	(Norway) NOR	August Mikkelsen	3	1	0+2	0	1	1
15	MF	(Norway) NOR	Magnus Andersen	26	4	21+3	4	1+1	0
16	FW	(Norway) NOR	Sigurd Grønli	7	1	1+4	0	2	1
17	FW	(Norway) NOR	Daniel Berntsen	22	0	17+4	0	0+1	0
18	MF	(Finland) FIN	Onni Valakari	32	7	29	7	2+1	0
19	DF	(Norway) NOR	Marcus Holmgren Pedersen	19	0	4+13	0	1+1	0
20	MF	(England) ENG	Aidan Barlow	7	0	6+1	0	0	0
22	DF	(Norway) NOR	Simen Wangberg	25	2	24	2	1	0
23	MF	(Sweden) SWE	Eric Smith	11	0	11	0	0	0
25	MF	(Norway) NOR	Lasse Nilsen	26	2	19+4	1	3	1
26	DF	(Norway) NOR	Jostein Gundersen	15	1	11+4	1	0	0
28	GK	(Norway) NOR	Jacob Karlstrøm	16	0	14	0	2	0
30	FW	(Norway) NOR	Runar Espejord	18	5	10+8	5	0	0
34	MF	(Norway) NOR	Tomas Stabell	2	0	0+1	0	1	0
36	FW	(Norway) NOR	Bryan Fiabema	1	0	0+1	0	0	0
77	FW	(Norway) NOR	Fitim Azemi	12	5	11+1	5	0	0
Players away from Tromsø on loan:
42	MF	(Norway) NOR	Mushaga Bakenga	9	0	2+6	0	0+1	0
Players who left Tromsø during the season:

=== Goal scorers ===
Place	Position	Nation	Number	Name	Eliteserien	Norwegian Cup	Total
1	MF	(Finland)	18	Onni Valakari	7	0	7
2	FW	(Norway)	30	Runar Espejord	5	0	5
2	FW	(Norway)	77	Fitim Azemi	5	0	5
4	MF	(Finland)	11	Robert Taylor	4	0	4
4	MF	(Norway)	15	Magnus Andersen	4	0	4
6	MF	(Denmark)	8	Oliver Kjærgaard	0	3	3
7	DF	(Finland)	6	Juha Pirinen	2	0	2
7	MF	(England)	20	Aidan Barlow	2	0	2
7	DF	(Norway)	22	Simen Wangberg	2	0	2
7	MF	(Norway)	10	Mikael Ingebrigtsen	1	1	2
7	DF	(Norway)	25	Lasse Nilsen	1	1	2
7	FW	(Costa Rica)	9	Brayan Rojas	0	2	2
13	MF	(Norway)	3	Kent-Are Antonsen	1	0	1
13	DF	(Norway)	5	Anders Jenssen	1	0	1
13	MF	(Norway)	7	Morten Gamst Pedersen	1	0	1
13	DF	(Norway)	26	Jostein Gundersen	1	0	1
13	FW	(Norway)	16	Sigurd Grønli	0	1	1
13	MF	(Norway)	14	August Mikkelsen	0	1	1
13				Own goal	0	1	1
				TOTALS	39	10	49

=== Disciplinary record ===
Number	Nation	Position	Name	Eliteserien		Norwegian Cup		Total	
Number	Nation	Position	Name	Booked	Sent off (straight red)	Booked	Sent off (straight red)	Booked	Sent off (straight red)
1	(Norway)	GK	Gudmund Taksdal Kongshavn	4	0	0	0	4	0
2	(Russia)	DF	Artyom Sokol	2	0	0	0	2	0
3	(Norway)	MF	Kent-Are Antonsen	6	0	1	0	7	0
5	(Norway)	DF	Anders Jenssen	6	0	0	0	6	0
6	(Finland)	DF	Juha Pirinen	3	0	0	0	3	0
7	(Norway)	MF	Morten Gamst Pedersen	3	0	0	0	3	0
8	(Denmark)	MF	Oliver Kjærgaard	0	0	1	0	1	0
10	(Norway)	MF	Mikael Ingebrigtsen	3	1	0	0	3	1
11	(Finland)	MF	Robert Taylor	3	0	0	0	3	0
15	(Norway)	MF	Magnus Andersen	1	0	0	0	1	0
16	(Norway)	FW	Sigurd Grønli	1	0	0	0	1	0
17	(Norway)	FW	Daniel Berntsen	2	0	0	0	2	0
18	(Finland)	MF	Onni Valakari	4	0	1	0	5	0
19	(Norway)	DF	Marcus Holmgren Pedersen	0	1	0	0	0	1
20	(England)	MF	Aidan Barlow	1	0	0	0	1	0
22	(Norway)	DF	Simen Wangberg	5	0	0	0	5	0
23	(Sweden)	MF	Eric Smith	2	0	0	0	2	0
25	(Norway)	MF	Lasse Nilsen	3	0	0	0	3	0
26	(Norway)	DF	Jostein Gundersen	1	0	0	0	1	0
34	(Norway)	MF	Tomas Stabell	0	0	1	0	1	0
Players away from Tromsø on loan:
42	(Norway)	FW	Mushaga Bakenga	1	0	0	0	1	0
Players who left Tromsø during the season:
			TOTALS	0	0	4	0	4	0
