= 2018 Tromsø IL season =

Tromsø
2018 season
- Chairman: Bjørn Nilsen
- Manager: Simo Valakari
- Stadium: Alfheim Stadion
- Eliteserien: 11th
- Norwegian Cup: Fourth Round vs Vålerenga
- Top goalscorer: League: Runar Espejord (6); All: Runar Espejord (8)
Home colours	Away colours

The 2018 season was Tromsø's fourth season back in the Tippeligaen following their relegation at the end of the 2013 and their 31st season in the top flight of Norwegian football. Tromsø finished the season in 11th position and reached the Fourth Round of the Norwegian Cup where they were knocked out by Vålerenga.

== Squad ==
Note: Flags indicate national team as defined under FIFA eligibility rules; some limited exceptions apply. Players may hold more than one non-FIFA nationality.

No.	Pos.	Nation	Player
1	GK	NOR	Gudmund Taksdal Kongshavn
2	DF	NOR	Tom Høgli
3	DF	NOR	Kent-Are Antonsen
5	DF	NOR	Magnar Ødegaard
6	MF	NOR	Christian Landu Landu
7	MF	NOR	Morten Gamst Pedersen
10	FW	NOR	Mikael Ingebrigtsen
11	MF	FIN	Robert Taylor
14	DF	NOR	Hans Norbye
15	MF	NOR	Magnus Andersen

No.	Pos.	Nation	Player
16	DF	NOR	Sigurd Grønli
17	MF	NOR	Daniel Berntsen
18	MF	FIN	Onni Valakari
22	DF	NOR	Simen Wangberg
23	MF	NOR	Gjermund Åsen
25	DF	NOR	Lasse Nilsen
26	DF	NOR	Jostein Gundersen
28	GK	NOR	Jacob Karlstrom
30	FW	NOR	Runar Espejord
42	FW	NOR	Mushaga Bakenga

=== Out on loan ===
Note: Flags indicate national team as defined under FIFA eligibility rules; some limited exceptions apply. Players may hold more than one non-FIFA nationality.

No.	Pos.	Nation	Player
4	DF	SEN	Mehdi Dioury (at Tromsdalen until 31 December 2018)
8	MF	DEN	Oliver Kjærgaard (at Nest-Sotra until 31 December 2018)
9	FW	SVN	Slobodan Vuk (at Domžale)

No.	Pos.	Nation	Player
—	MF	NOR	Henrik Johnsgård (at Tromsdalen)
—	MF	NOR	August Mikkelsen (at Tromsdalen)

== Transfers ==
=== Winter ===
In: Note: Flags indicate national team as defined under FIFA eligibility rules; some limited exceptions apply. Players may hold more than one non-FIFA nationality.

No.	Pos.	Nation	Player
2	DF	NOR	Tom Høgli (from (Denmark) Copenhagen)
8	MF	DEN	Oliver Kjærgaard (from (Denmark) Lyngby)
11	MF	FIN	Robert Taylor (on loan from (Sweden) AIK)
17	MF	NOR	Daniel Berntsen (from (Norway) Vålerenga)

Out: Note: Flags indicate national team as defined under FIFA eligibility rules; some limited exceptions apply. Players may hold more than one non-FIFA nationality.

No.	Pos.	Nation	Player
8	MF	NOR	Ulrik Yttergård Jenssen (to (Denmark) Nordsjælland)
10	FW	NOR	Thomas Lehne Olsen (to (Norway) Lillestrøm)
11	MF	NOR	Jonas Johansen (retired)
17	MF	ISL	Aron Sigurðarson (to (Norway) Start)
19	MF	NOR	William Frantzen (released)
20	MF	NOR	Peter Aas (to (Norway) Alta)
21	GK	FIN	Otto Fredrikson (retired)
24	FW	NOR	Mikael Ingebrigtsen (to (Sweden) IFK Göteborg)
27	FW	NOR	Fredrik Michalsen (released, previously on loan at (Iceland) Fjölnir)
35	FW	NOR	Garib Gerkondani (to (Norway) Finnsnes)
40	GK	ESP	Javier Jiménez Camarero (to (Spain) UCAM Murcia)
88	MF	RUS	Shamil Gasanov (to (Russia) Yenisey Krasnoyarsk)

=== Summer ===
In: Note: Flags indicate national team as defined under FIFA eligibility rules; some limited exceptions apply. Players may hold more than one non-FIFA nationality.

No.	Pos.	Nation	Player
10	FW	NOR	Mikael Ingebrigtsen (from (Sweden) IFK Göteborg)
11	MF	FIN	Robert Taylor (from (Sweden) AIK, previously on loan)
18	MF	FIN	Onni Valakari (from (Finland) TPS)

Out: Note: Flags indicate national team as defined under FIFA eligibility rules; some limited exceptions apply. Players may hold more than one non-FIFA nationality.

No.	Pos.	Nation	Player
8	MF	DEN	Oliver Kjærgaard (on loan to (Norway) Nest-Sotra)
9	FW	SVN	Slobodan Vuk (on loan to (Slovenia) Domžale)
12	GK	CRO	Filip Lončarić (retired)
18	FW	SEN	Elhadji Mour Samb (released)
—	MF	NOR	Henrik Johnsgård (on loan to (Norway) Tromsdalen)
—	MF	NOR	August Mikkelsen (on loan to (Norway) Tromsdalen)

== Competitions ==
=== Eliteserien ===
==== Results summary ====
Overall								Home						Away					
Pld	W	D	L	GF	GA	GD	Pts	W	D	L	GF	GA	GD	W	D	L	GF	GA	GD
30	11	3	16	41	48	−7	36	7	2	6	26	19	+7	4	1	10	15	29	−14

Last updated: 24 November 2018.
Source: see below

==== Results by round ====
Round	1	2	3	4	5	6	7	8	9	10	11	12	13	14	15	16	17	18	19	20	21	22	23	24	25	26	27	28	29	30
Ground	A	A	H	H	A	H	H	A	H	A	H	A	H	A	H	A	H	A	A	H	A	H	A	H	A	H	A	H	A	H
Result	L	L	W	W	D	W	D	L	L	W	W	L	W	W	W	L	L	L	L	L	W	D	L	W	L	L	L	L	W	L
Position	15	16	12	5	8	5	6	8	9	9	7	8	7	5	5	7	7	7	8	9	8	9	10	8	9	10	10	10	10	10

Updated to match(es) played on 24 November 2018. Source: see below
A = Away; H = Home; W = Win; D = Draw; L = Loss

==== Results ====
11 March 2018 1	Start	4–1	Tromsø	Kristiansand
18:00 CET (UTC+1)	Finnbogason 6'; Kabran 7'; Twum (yellow card) 22'; Robstad (yellow card) 34'; Käck 61'; Christensen (yellow card) 75'; Afeez 90+1'	Report	Wangberg (yellow card) 13'; Landu Landu (yellow card) 43'; Pedersen 90'	Stadium: Sør Arena; Attendance: 3,608; Referee: Trygve Kjensli

2 April 2018 3	Molde	2–1	Tromsø	Molde
18:00 CEST (UTC+2)	Hussain 22', 28'; Forren (yellow card) 50'; Hestad (yellow card) 53'	Report	Taylor 43'; Pedersen (yellow card) 56'	Stadium: Aker Stadion; Attendance: 6,438; Referee: Trond Ivar Døvle

8 April 2018 4	Tromsø	4–0	Ranheim	Tromsø
18:00 CEST (UTC+2)	Åsen 48', 66'; Nilsen 74'; Vuk 83'	Report	Foosnæs (yellow card) 28'; Storflor (yellow card) 66'; Sandmæl (yellow card) 73'	Stadium: Alfheim Stadion; Attendance: 3,028; Referee: Kristoffer Hagenes

11 April 2018 2	Tromsø	3–1	Strømsgodset	Tromsø
18:30 CEST (UTC+2)	Espejord 7'; Antonsen 35'; Berntsen 69'	Report	Jradi (yellow card) 33'; Stengel (yellow card) 72'; Pellegrino 79'	Stadium: Alfheim Stadion; Attendance: 2,908; Referee: Tom Harald Hagen

15 April 2018 5	Stabæk	1–1	Tromsø	Bærum
18:00 CEST (UTC+2)	Brynhildsen 3'; Demidov (yellow card) 34'	Report	Vuk 11'; Antonsen (yellow card) 39'; Gundersen (yellow card) 77'	Stadium: Nadderud Stadion; Attendance: 3,564; Referee: Rohit Saggi

22 April 2018 6	Tromsø	4–1	Sandefjord	Tromsø
18:00 CEST (UTC+2)	Espejord 6', 16'; Antonsen 30'; Berntsen 40'; Åsen (yellow card) 60'	Report	Kastrati 17'; Olsen (yellow card) 26'; Storbæk (yellow card) 88'	Stadium: Alfheim Stadion; Attendance: 3,692; Referee: Kai Erik Steen

29 April 2018 7	Tromsø	0–0	Kristiansund	Tromsø
18:00 CEST (UTC+2)		Report	D.Ulvestad (yellow card) 90+2'	Stadium: Alfheim Stadion; Attendance: 4,131; Referee: Dag Vidar Hafsås

6 May 2018 8	Brann	3–0	Tromsø	Bergen
20:00 CEST (UTC+2)	Wangberg 18' (o.g.); Skålevik 34', 62'; Barmen (yellow card) 61'; Larsen (yellow card) 73'	Report	Berntsen (yellow card) 62'	Stadium: Brann Stadion; Attendance: 9,755; Referee: Rohit Saggi

13 May 2018 9	Tromsø	1–2	Lillestrøm	Tromsø
18:00 CEST (UTC+2)	Ødegaard 45'	Report	Martin 22'; Olsen 26'; Brenden (yellow card) 74'	Stadium: Alfheim Stadion; Attendance: 3,885; Referee: Trygve Kjensli

16 May 2018 10	Bodø/Glimt	0–1	Tromsø	Bodø
18:00 CEST (UTC+2)	Saltnes (yellow card) 83'; Opseth (yellow card) 90+2'	Report	Taylor (yellow card) 37'; Espejord 43'; Bakenga (yellow card) 69'; Pedersen (yellow card) 83'	Stadium: Aspmyra Stadion; Referee: Kristoffer Hagenes

21 May 2018 11	Tromsø	3–0	Vålerenga	Tromsø
18:00 CEST (UTC+2)	Antonsen 7'; Wangberg 45'; Berntsen 77'	Report	Ejuke (yellow card) 43'; Ibrahim (yellow card) 82'	Stadium: Alfheim Stadion; Attendance: 3,914; Referee: Sigurd Kringstad

27 May 2018 12	Haugesund	1–0	Tromsø	Haugesund
18:00 CEST (UTC+2)	Gytkjær 30'	Report	Ødegaard (yellow card) 89'	Stadium: Haugesund Stadion; Attendance: 4,192; Referee: Dag Vidar Hafsås

11 June 2018 13	Tromsø	2–1	Rosenborg	Tromsø
19:00 CEST (UTC+2)	Gundersen 28'; Nilsen 58'	Report	Reginiussen (yellow card) 60' (goal) 63'; Jensen (yellow card) 90'	Stadium: Alfheim Stadion; Attendance: 5,214; Referee: Ola Hobber Nilsen

24 June 2018 14	Sarpsborg 08	2–3	Tromsø	Sarpsborg
18:00 CEST (UTC+2)	Agger 9'; Thomassen 67'	Report	Gundersen (yellow card) 10' (goal) 83'; Nilsen 47'; Berntsen (yellow card) 60'; Taylor 88'; Wangberg (yellow card) 90+4'	Stadium: Sarpsborg Stadion; Attendance: 5,240; Referee: Espen Eskås

1 July 2018 15	Tromsø	2–1	Odd	Tromsø
18:00 CEST (UTC+2)	Espejord 7'; Wangberg 53'; Antonsen (yellow card) 90'	Report	Rashani 14' (yellow card) 62'	Stadium: Alfheim Stadion; Attendance: 3,387; Referee: Sigurd Kringstad

7 July 2018 16	Rosenborg	2–1	Tromsø	Trondheim
18:00 CEST (UTC+2)	Jensen (yellow card) 33' (goal) 34'; Botheim 48'; Dahl Reitan (yellow card) 58'	Report	Wangberg 71'; Espejord 85'; Ødegaard (yellow card) 90'	Stadium: Lerkendal Stadion; Attendance: 15,384; Referee: Trond Ivar Døvle

5 August 2018 17	Tromsø	1–2	Haugesund	Tromsø
18:00 CEST (UTC+2)	Andersen 61'; Pedersen (yellow card) 74'; Wangberg (yellow card) 75'	Report	Koné 5'; Stølås 75'	Stadium: Alfheim Stadion; Attendance: 3,713; Referee: Kristoffer Hagenes

10 August 2018 18	Sandefjord	1–0	Tromsø	Sandefjord
18:00 CEST (UTC+2)	Kurtovic 55'; Pálsson (yellow card) 80'	Report	Gundersen (yellow card) 48'	Stadium: Komplett Arena; Attendance: 5,319; Referee: Rohit Saggi

19 August 2018 19	Vålerenga	3–0	Tromsø	Oslo
20:00 CEST (UTC+2)	Finne 6'; Grødem 89'; Michael 90+3'	Report		Stadium: Intility Arena; Attendance: 8,254; Referee: Tore Hansen

25 August 2018 20	Tromsø	1–2	Bodø/Glimt	Tromsø
18:00 CEST (UTC+2)	Pedersen (yellow card) 45+2'; Antonsen 55'	Report	Saltnes 61'; Bjørnbak 65'; Ricardo (yellow card) 75'; Zinckernagel (yellow card) 81'	Stadium: Alfheim Stadion; Attendance: 4,701; Referee: Trond Ivar Døvle

1 September 2018 21	Strømsgodset	2–4	Tromsø	Drammen
15:30 CEST (UTC+2)	Andersen 22', 50'; Nguen (yellow card) 61'; Glesnes (yellow card) 68'; Tokstad (yellow card) 90+4'	Report	Ingebrigtsen 29'; Taylor 36' (pen.); Gundersen 63'; Valakari 78'; Åsen (yellow card) 90+6'	Stadium: Marienlyst Stadion; Attendance: 5,463; Referee: Sigurd Smehus Kringstad

16 September 2018 22	Tromsø	0–0	Stabæk	Tromsø
18:00 CEST (UTC+2)		Report	Børkeeiet (yellow card) 9'	Stadium: Alfheim Stadion; Attendance: 3,473; Referee: Dag Vidar Hafsås

24 September 2018 23	Lillestrøm	1–0	Tromsø	Lillestrøm
19:00 CEST (UTC+2)	Smárason 79' (pen.)	Report	Taylor (yellow card) 62'	Stadium: Åråsen Stadion; Attendance: 4,672; Referee: Svein Oddvar Moen

1 October 2018 24	Tromsø	2–1	Brann	Tromsø
19:00 CEST (UTC+2)	Antonsen 2'; Nilsen (yellow card) 49'; Valakari (yellow card) 59'; Ingebrigtsen 73'	Report	Haugen 3'; Acosta (yellow card) 71'	Stadium: Alfheim Stadion; Attendance: 3,538; Referee: Trygve Kjensli

7 October 2018 25	Kristiansund	5–1	Tromsø	Kristiansund
18:00 CEST (UTC+2)	Kastrati (yellow card) 11'; Kalludra 35', 85'; Gjertsen 66', 80'; Bye 75' (pen.); Psyché (yellow card) 90'	Report	Ingebrigtsen (yellow card) 72'; Bakenga 87'	Stadium: Kristiansund Stadion; Attendance: 4,251; Referee: Espen Eskås

21 October 2018 26	Tromsø	1–2	Start	Tromsø
18:00 CEST (UTC+2)	Wangberg (yellow card) 55'; Pedersen (yellow card) 79'; Bakenga 86'	Report	Lowe (yellow card) 10'; Shala 41' (yellow card) 59'; Wangberg 65' (o.g.); Afeez (yellow card) 75'; Segberg (yellow card) 77'	Stadium: Alfheim Stadion; Attendance: 3,116; Referee: Tom Harald Hagen

28 October 2018 27	Odd	1–0	Tromsø	Skien
18:00 CET (UTC+1)	Hoff (yellow card) 53'; Pedersen 56' (o.g.); Broberg (yellow card) 70'	Report	Valakari (yellow card) 70'	Stadium: Skagerak Arena; Attendance: 4,943; Referee: Rohit Saggi

4 November 2018 28	Tromsø	2–4	Molde	Tromsø
18:00 CET (UTC+1)	Valakari 28' (yellow card) 84'; Taylor 67' (yellow card) 84'	Report	Hussain 20'; Aursnes 36'; Eikrem 57'; Cibicki 90+2'	Stadium: Alfheim Stadion; Attendance: 3,130; Referee: Kai Erik Steen

11 November 2018 29	Ranheim	1–2	Tromsø	Trondheim
18:00 CET (UTC+1)	Foosnæs 57'	Report	Berntsen 8', 34'; Norbye (yellow card) 86'	Stadium: EXTRA Arena; Attendance: 1,729; Referee: Kristoffer Hagenes

24 November 2018 30	Tromsø	0–2	Sarpsborg 08	Tromsø
18:00 CET (UTC+1)		Report	Muhammed 6'; Heintz 32' (yellow card) 37'; Horn (yellow card) 49'; Halvorsen (yellow card) 55'	Stadium: Alfheim Stadion; Attendance: 2,998; Referee: Dag Vidar Hafsås

==== Table ====
Pos	Team	Pld	W	D	L	GF	GA	GD	Pts
8	Sarpsborg 08	30	11	8	11	46	39	+7	41
9	Odd	30	11	7	12	39	38	+1	40
10	Tromsø	30	11	3	16	41	48	−7	36
11	Bodø/Glimt	30	6	14	10	32	35	−3	32
12	Lillestrøm	30	7	11	12	34	44	−10	32

Source: Football Association of Norway (in Norwegian), Soccerway
Rules for classification: 1) Points; 2) Goal difference; 3) Goals scored; 4) Head-to-head points; 5) Head-to-head goal difference; 6) Head-to-head away goals scored (only if between two teams); 7) Head-to-head goals scored; 8) Play-off (only used to decide champions or relegation).

=== Norwegian Cup ===
18 April 2018 First Round	Skjervøy	1–3	Tromsø	Skjervøy
18:00 CEST (UTC+2)	S.Dreyer (yellow card) 24'; R.Waage 78'	Report	Samb 11'; Kjærgaard 76'; Grønli 81'	Stadium: Skjervøy kunstgress Attendance: 501; Referee: Egil Bertheussen

2 May 2018 Second Round	Senja	0–1 (a.e.t.)	Tromsø	Silsand
18:00 CEST (UTC+2)	A.Mikkelsen (yellow card) 54'	Report	Kjærgaard (yellow card) 69'; Landu-Landu 119'	Stadium: Islandbotn; Attendance: 500; Referee: Magnus Koløy

9 May 2018 Third Round	Alta	0–1 (a.e.t.)	Tromsø	Alta
18:00 CEST (UTC+2)	M.Hansen (yellow card) 19' (yellow-red card) 106'; H.Mannsverk (yellow card) 100'; O.Olsen (yellow card) 104'	Report	Antonsen (yellow card) 84'; Bakenga 107'	Stadium: Alta Idrettspark; Attendance: 1,001; Referee: Bjørn Hansen

14 June 2018 Fourth Round	Tromsø	3–3 (a.e.t.) (4–5 p)	Vålerenga	Tromsø
18:00 CEST (UTC+2)	Berntsen 31'; Vuk (yellow card) 33'; Espejord 69', 100'; Gundersen (yellow card) 120+1'	Report	Finne 3', 94'; Nouri (yellow card) 80'; Ejuke (yellow card) 81'; Johnson 82'; Adekugbe (yellow card) 87'; Holm (yellow card) 98' (yellow-red card) 115'	Stadium: Alfheim Stadion; Attendance: 2,166; Referee: Rohit Saggi
	Penalties
	Espejord (penalty scored); Gundersen (penalty missed); Bakenga (penalty scored); Samb (penalty scored); Taylor (penalty scored)		(penalty scored) Tollås; (penalty scored) Juklerød; (penalty missed) Johnson; (penalty scored) Adekugbe; (penalty scored) Ejuke

== Squad statistics ==
As of match played 24 November 2018

=== Appearances and goals ===
No.	Pos	Nat	Player	Total		Eliteserien		Norwegian Cup	
No.	Pos	Nat	Player	Apps	Goals	Apps	Goals	Apps	Goals
1	GK	(Norway) NOR	Gudmund Taksdal Kongshavn	25	0	24+1	0	0	0
2	DF	(Norway) NOR	Tom Høgli	15	0	13	0	2	0
3	DF	(Norway) NOR	Kent-Are Antonsen	32	5	27+2	5	3	0
5	DF	(Norway) NOR	Magnar Ødegaard	31	1	28	1	3	0
6	MF	(Norway) NOR	Christian Landu Landu	16	1	3+9	0	4	1
7	MF	(Norway) NOR	Morten Gamst Pedersen	29	1	27	1	2	0
10	FW	(Norway) NOR	Mikael Ingebrigtsen	12	2	11+1	2	0	0
11	MF	(Finland) FIN	Robert Taylor	30	4	27	4	3	0
14	DF	(Norway) NOR	Hans Norbye	5	0	0+3	0	1+1	0
15	MF	(Norway) NOR	Magnus Andersen	11	1	5+3	1	2+1	0
16	DF	(Norway) NOR	Sigurd Grønli	10	1	0+8	0	0+2	1
17	MF	(Norway) NOR	Daniel Berntsen	31	6	25+3	5	3	1
18	MF	(Finland) FIN	Onni Valakari	13	2	8+5	2	0	0
22	DF	(Norway) NOR	Simen Wangberg	27	2	25	2	2	0
23	MF	(Norway) NOR	Gjermund Åsen	21	2	21	2	0	0
25	DF	(Norway) NOR	Lasse Nilsen	28	3	25+1	3	2	0
26	DF	(Norway) NOR	Jostein Gundersen	28	3	24	3	4	0
28	GK	(Norway) NOR	Jacob Karlstrom	11	0	6+1	0	4	0
30	FW	(Norway) NOR	Runar Espejord	21	8	18+1	6	0+2	2
33	DF	(Norway) NOR	Gustav Severinsen	1	0	0	0	0+1	0
34	MF	(Norway) NOR	Marcus Pedersen	5	0	0+3	0	0+2	0
42	FW	(Norway) NOR	Mushaga Bakenga	28	3	11+14	2	2+1	1
Players away from Tromsø on loan:
8	MF	(Denmark) DEN	Oliver Kjærgaard	4	1	0+2	0	2	1
9	FW	(Slovenia) SVN	Slobodan Vuk	13	2	1+9	2	3	0
Players who left Tromsø during the season:
18	FW	(Senegal) SEN	Elhadji Mour Samb	13	1	1+8	0	2+2	1

=== Goal scorers ===
Place	Position	Nation	Number	Name	Eliteserien	Norwegian Cup	Total
1	FW	(Norway)	30	Runar Espejord	6	2	8
2	MF	(Norway)	17	Daniel Berntsen	5	1	6
3	DF	(Norway)	3	Kent-Are Antonsen	5	0	5
4	MF	(Finland)	11	Robert Taylor	4	0	4
5	DF	(Norway)	25	Lasse Nilsen	3	0	3
5	DF	(Norway)	26	Jostein Gundersen	3	0	3
5	FW	(Norway)	42	Mushaga Bakenga	2	1	3
8	MF	(Norway)	23	Gjermund Åsen	2	0	2
8	FW	(Slovenia)	9	Slobodan Vuk	2	0	2
8	DF	(Norway)	22	Simen Wangberg	2	0	2
8	FW	(Norway)	10	Mikael Ingebrigtsen	2	0	2
8	MF	(Finland)	18	Onni Valakari	2	0	2
13	MF	(Norway)	7	Morten Gamst Pedersen	1	0	1
13	DF	(Norway)	5	Magnar Ødegaard	1	0	1
13	MF	(Norway)	15	Magnus Andersen	1	0	1
13	FW	(Senegal)	18	Elhadji Mour Samb	0	1	1
13	MF	(Denmark)	8	Oliver Kjærgaard	0	1	1
13	DF	(Norway)	16	Sigurd Grønli	0	1	1
13	MF	(Norway)	6	Christian Landu Landu	0	1	1
				TOTALS	41	8	49

=== Disciplinary record ===
Number	Nation	Position	Name	Eliteserien		Norwegian Cup		Total	
Number	Nation	Position	Name	Booked	Sent off (straight red)	Booked	Sent off (straight red)	Booked	Sent off (straight red)
3	(Norway)	DF	Kent-Are Antonsen	2	0	1	0	3	0
5	(Norway)	DF	Magnar Ødegaard	2	0	0	0	2	0
6	(Norway)	MF	Christian Landu Landu	1	0	0	0	1	0
7	(Norway)	MF	Morten Gamst Pedersen	5	0	0	0	5	0
9	(Slovenia)	FW	Slobodan Vuk	0	0	1	0	1	0
10	(Norway)	MF	Mikael Ingebrigtsen	1	0	0	0	1	0
11	(Finland)	MF	Robert Taylor	3	0	0	0	3	0
14	(Norway)	DF	Hans Norbye	1	0	0	0	1	0
17	(Norway)	MF	Daniel Berntsen	2	0	0	0	2	0
18	(Finland)	MF	Onni Valakari	3	0	0	0	3	0
22	(Norway)	DF	Simen Wangberg	5	0	0	0	5	0
23	(Norway)	MF	Gjermund Åsen	2	0	0	0	2	0
25	(Norway)	DF	Lasse Nilsen	1	0	0	0	1	0
26	(Norway)	DF	Jostein Gundersen	3	0	1	0	4	0
42	(Norway)	FW	Mushaga Bakenga	1	0	0	0	1	0
Players away from Tromsø on loan:
8	(Denmark)	MF	Oliver Kjærgaard	0	0	1	0	1	0
			TOTALS	32	0	4	0	36	0
