= Oliver Kjærgaard =

Danish footballer (born 1998)

Personal information
- Date of birth: 11 July 1998 (age 28)
- Place of birth: Kokkedal, Denmark
- Height: 1.84 m (6 ft 0 in)
- Position: Midfielder

Team information
- Current team: Hvidovre
- Number: 14

Youth career
- Lyngby

Senior career*
Years	Team	Apps	(Gls)
2016–2018	Lyngby	8	(0)
2018–2019	Tromsø	4	(0)
2018	→ Nest-Sotra (loan)	13	(1)
2020–2023	Helsingør	72	(11)
2023–2024	HamKam	37	(2)
2024–2025	Horsens	25	(3)
2025–	Hvidovre	28	(3)

International career
2015–2016	Denmark U18	6	(2)
2016–2017	Denmark U19	7	(1)
2017	Denmark U20	2	(1)
- * Club domestic league appearances and goals as of 2 June 2026

Oliver Kjærgaard (born 11 July 1998) is a Danish professional footballer who plays as a midfielder for Danish 1st Division club Hvidovre IF.

== Club career ==
=== Lyngby BK ===
Kjærgaard got his debut at the age of 17, on 8 December 2015 against AB in the Danish Cup, that Lyngby won 3–0. He came on the pitch in the 61nd minute, where he replaced Oke Akpoveta. He did also play 2 games for the club in that season, in the Danish 1st Division.

On 24 September 2016 Lyngby BK confirmed, that they had extended Kjærgaard's until 2019. But he continued playing for their U19 squad. He played his first match in the Danish Superliga on 31 March 2017 against FC Nordsjælland.

Due to the economic situation of Lyngby in 2018, he terminated his contract on 9 February 2018.

=== Tromsø IL ===
After leaving the club, he went on a trial at Tromsø IL. He signed officially for the club on 22 February 2018. He played his first game for the club in a 4–1 victory on 28 April 2018 against Sandefjord, where he entered the pitch in the 76th minute.

After playing only two games for Tromsø, Kjærgaard was loaned out to Nest-Sotra on 2 August 2018. He idea was, that he should act as a replacement for Johnny Furdals. The deal was for the rest of the year.

The deal was terminated on 2 January 2020.

=== FC Helsingør ===
Kjærgaard returned to Denmark and trained with FC Helsingør in about a month. On 5 March 2020 the club confirmed, that Kjærgaard had signed a contract until the end of the season. Kjærgaard left Helsingør in February 2023 after a total of 84 games, 11 goals and 6 assist.

=== HamKam ===
On 7 February 2023 it was confirmed, that Kjærgaard had returned to Norway, signing a deal until the end of 2025 with Eliteserien club HamKam, which had Danish Jakob Michelsen as head coach.

=== AC Horsens and Hvidovre IF ===
On 5 August 2024, it was confirmed that Kjærgaard returned to Denmark when he joined Danish 1st Division club AC Horsens on a contract until June 2026.

A year later, in July 2024, Kjærgaard moved to Hvidovre IF. Martin Retov had just become the new coach in Hvidovre, after being fired from AC Horsens, which is why Kjærgaard allegedly followed him.

== Career statistics ==
=== Club ===
As of 17 May 2024

Appearances and goals by club, season and competition
Club	Season	League			Cup		Total	
Club	Season	Division	Apps	Goals	Apps	Goals	Apps	Goals
Lyngby	2015–16	Bet25 Liga	2	0	0	0	2	0
Lyngby	2016–17	Danish Superliga	3	0	0	0	3	0
Lyngby	2017–18	Danish Superliga	3	0	0	0	3	0
Lyngby	Total		8	0	0	0	8	0
Tromsø	2018	Eliteserien	2	0	2	1	4	1
Tromsø	2019	Eliteserien	2	0	2	3	4	3
Tromsø	Total		4	0	4	4	8	4
Nest-Sotra (loan)	2018	OBOS-ligaen	13	1	0	0	13	1
Nest-Sotra (loan)	Total		13	1	0	0	13	1
Helsingør	2020–21	NordicBet Liga	29	7	0	0	29	7
Helsingør	2021-22	NordicBet Liga	26	1	3	0	29	1
Helsingør	2022-23	NordicBet Liga	17	3	3	0	20	3
Helsingør	Total		72	11	6	0	78	11
HamKam	2023	Eliteserien	26	2	5	1	31	3
HamKam	2024	Eliteserien	7	0	3	1	10	1
HamKam	Total		33	2	8	2	41	4
Career total			130	14	18	6	148	20
