= Jacob Karlstrøm =

Norwegian footballer (born 1997)

Personal information
- Full name: Jacob Karlstrøm
- Date of birth: 9 January 1997 (age 29)
- Place of birth: Tromsø, Norway
- Height: 2.00 m (6 ft 7 in)
- Position: Goalkeeper

Team information
- Current team: Anorthosis Famagusta
- Number: 28

Youth career
- 2012–2016: Tromsø

Senior career*
Years	Team	Apps	(Gls)
2016–2021	Tromsø	85	(0)
2022–2025	Molde	84	(0)
2024	→ IFK Göteborg (loan)	14	(0)
2026–	Anorthosis Famagusta	24	(0)
- * Club domestic league appearances and goals as of 14 November 2026

Jacob Karlstrøm (born 9 January 1997) is a Norwegian professional footballer who plays as a goalkeeper for Cypriot First Division club Anorthosis Famagusta.

== Career ==
On 15 December 2021, Karlstrøm signed for Molde on a contract that would run until the end of the 2025 season. In August 2024 he signed on loan for Swedish club IFK Göteborg. On 7 January 2026, Molde announced that Karlstrøm had left the club following the expiration of his contract.

== Career statistics ==
As of match played 8 November 2026

Appearances and goals by club, season and competition
Club	Season	League			National cup (Note: Includes Norwegian Cup, Cypriot Cup)		Europe		Total	
Club	Season	Division	Apps	Goals	Apps	Goals	Apps	Goals	Apps	Goals
Tromsø	2016	Eliteserien	0	0	0	0	—		0	0
Tromsø	2017	Eliteserien	5	0	3	0	—		8	0
Tromsø	2018	Eliteserien	7	0	4	0	—		11	0
Tromsø	2019	Eliteserien	14	0	2	0	—		16	0
Tromsø	2020	1. divisjon	29	0	—		—		29	0
Tromsø	2021	Eliteserien	30	0	1	0	—		31	0
Tromsø	Total		85	0	10	0	—		95	0
Molde	2022	Eliteserien	26	0	4	0	12 (Note: Appearances in UEFA Conference League)	0	42	0
Molde	2023	Eliteserien	22	0	5	0	8 (Note: Six appearances in UEFA Champions League, and two appearances in UEFA Europa League)	0	35	0
Molde	2024	Eliteserien	8	0	0	0	1 (Note: Appearance in UEFA Europa League)	0	9	0
Molde	2025	Eliteserien	28	0	4	0	4	0	36	0
Molde	Total		84	0	14	0	21	0	122	0
IFK Göteborg (loan)	2024	Allsvenskan	14	0	0	0	—		14	0
Anorthosis Famagusta	2025–26	Cypriot First Division	16	0	1	0	—		17	0
Anorthosis Famagusta	2026–27	Cypriot First Division	8	0	0	0	—		8	0
Anorthosis Famagusta	Total		24	0	1	0	0	0	25	0
Career total			207	0	25	0	25	0	257	0

== Honours ==
Tromsø

- 1. divisjon: 2020

Molde

- Eliteserien: 2022
- Norwegian Cup: 2021-22, 2023
