= August Mikkelsen =

Norwegian footballer (born 2000)

Personal information
- Date of birth: 24 October 2000 (age 26)
- Place of birth: Tromsø, Norway
- Height: 1.67 m (5 ft 6 in)
- Positions: Attacking midfielder; forward

Team information
- Current team: Bodø/Glimt
- Number: 94

Youth career
- –2014: Tromsdalen
- 2015–2018: Tromsø

Senior career*
Years	Team	Apps	(Gls)
2018	→ Tromsdalen (loan)	3	(0)
2019–2023	Tromsø	68	(15)
2023–2024	Hammarby IF	21	(1)
2024–	Bodø/Glimt	23	(2)
2025	→ Tromsø (loan)	16	(0)

International career^{‡}
2019	Norway U19	2	(0)
2022	Norway U21	1	(0)
- * Club domestic league appearances and goals as of 6 April 2026 ‡ National team caps and goals as of 23 November 2022

August Mikkelsen (born 24 October 2000) is a Norwegian professional footballer who plays as an attacking midfielder or forward for Eliteserien club Bodø/Glimt.

== Club career ==
=== Tromsø ===
Mikkelsen played youth football for Tromsdalen UIL and Tromsø IL, and attended the Norwegian School of Elite Sport in Tromsø. He started his senior career in Tromsdalen, on loan in the summer and fall of 2018. In 2019, he was back in Tromsø and made his Eliteserien debut in May 2019 against Odd. He was also capped for Norway U19. In the 2020 1. divisjon he played semi-regularly for Tromsø, that won a promotion back to the top tier.

In 2021, Mikkelsen had his major breakthrough, scoring eight goals in 27 league appearances, as the newly promoted side finished 12th in the table. On 9 December, after the last league fixture, Mikkelsen signed a new four-year contract with the club. He was one of three players nominated to win Eliteserien Young Player of the Year, but the award was eventually given to Mads Hedenstad Christiansen. Mikkelsen retained his fine form in 2022, scoring seven goals and providing five assists in 26 appearances, helping his side to finish 7th in the Eliteserien table. After the season, Mikkelsen was voted Tromsø Player of the Year by the supporters of the club.

=== Hammarby ===
On 25 January 2023, Mikkelsen transferred to Hammarby IF in Allsvenskan, signing a five-year contract. The transfer fee was reportedly set at around €2 Million, with potential bonuses included. Throughout his debut season in Sweden, Mikkelsen struggled to make an impression, making 21 goalless league appearances.

=== Bodø/Glimt ===
On 24 March 2024, Mikkelsen moved to Bodø/Glimt signing a four-year contract.

Ahead of the 2025 season, Mikkelsen was loaned out to his former club Tromsø, on a year-long loan with an option to buy after the season.

== Career statistics ==
=== Club ===
As of 6 April 2026

Appearances and goals by club, season and competition
Club	Season	League			National cup (Note: Includes Norwegian Cup, and Svenska Cupen)		Europe		Total	
Club	Season	Division	Apps	Goals	Apps	Goals	Apps	Goals	Apps	Goals
Tromsdalen (loan)	2018	1. divisjon	3	0	0	0	—		3	0
Tromsø	2019	Eliteserien	2	0	1	1	—		3	1
Tromsø	2020	1. divisjon	13	0	—		—		13	0
Tromsø	2021	Eliteserien	27	8	2	1	—		29	9
Tromsø	2022	Eliteserien	26	7	1	0	—		27	7
Tromsø	Total		68	15	4	2	—		72	17
Hammarby	2023	Allsvenskan	21	1	2	0	1 (Note: Appearances in UEFA Europa Conference League)	0	24	1
Hammarby	2024	Allsvenskan	0	0	2	1	0	0	2	1
Hammarby	Total		21	1	4	1	1	0	26	2
Bodø/Glimt	2024	Eliteserien	22	2	1	0	5 (Note: Three appearances and two goals in UEFA Champions League, two appearances in UEFA Europa League)	2	28	4
Bodø/Glimt	2025	Eliteserien	0	0	1	0	0	0	1	0
Bodø/Glimt	2026	Eliteserien	1	0	0	0	0	0	1	0
Bodø/Glimt	Total		23	2	2	0	5	2	30	4
Tromsø (loan)	2025	Eliteserien	16	0	3	0	—		19	0
Career total			131	18	13	3	6	2	150	23

== Honours ==
Bodø/Glimt

- Eliteserien: 2024

Individual

- Eliteserien Young Player of the Month: October 2021
