= Mikael Ingebrigtsen =

Norwegian footballer (born 1996)

Personal information
- Full name: Mikael Norø Ingebrigtsen
- Date of birth: 21 July 1996 (age 30)
- Place of birth: Tromsø, Norway
- Height: 1.70 m (5 ft 7 in)
- Position: Winger

Team information
- Current team: Kolding
- Number: 7

Youth career
- Tromsø

Senior career*
Years	Team	Apps	(Gls)
2014–2017	Tromsø	77	(14)
2018	IFK Göteborg	4	(0)
2018–2021	Tromsø	51	(10)
2022–2024	Odd	75	(15)
2025	Omonia	2	(0)
2025–	Kolding	17	(3)

International career^{‡}
2011	Norway U15	2	(0)
2012	Norway U16	5	(1)
2014	Norway U18	1	(0)
2015	Norway U19	1	(0)
2017-2018	Norway U21	4	(0)
- * Club domestic league appearances and goals as of 2 June 2026 ‡ National team caps and goals as of 18:51, 30 August 2025 (UTC)

Mikael Norø Ingebrigtsen (born 21 July 1996) is a Norwegian footballer who plays as a winger for Danish 1st Division club Kolding IF.

Ingebrigtsen was born in Tromsø.

== Career statistics ==
As of match played 25 September 2025

Appearances and goals by club, season and competition
Club	Season	League			National Cup		Other		Total	
Club	Season	Division	Apps	Goals	Apps	Goals	Apps	Goals	Apps	Goals
Tromsø	2014	1. divisjon	6	0	3	1	1 (Note: Appearances in UEFA Europa League)	0	10	1
Tromsø	2015	Tippeligaen	20	3	1	1	-		21	4
Tromsø	2016	Tippeligaen	24	3	5	2	-		29	5
Tromsø	2017	Eliteserien	27	8	4	3	-		31	11
Tromsø	Total		77	14	13	7	1	0	91	21
IFK Göteborg	2018	Allsvenskan	4	0	3	0	-		7	0
IFK Göteborg	Total		4	0	3	0	0	0	7	0
Tromsø	2018	Eliteserien	12	2	0	0	-		12	2
Tromsø	2019	Eliteserien	10	1	2	1	-		12	2
Tromsø	2020	OBOS-ligaen	23	7	-		-		23	7
Tromsø	2021	Eliteserien	6	0	2	2	-		8	2
Tromsø	Total		51	10	4	3	0	0	55	13
Odd	2022	Eliteserien	24	4	4	2	-		28	6
Odd	2023	Eliteserien	24	6	1	0	-		25	6
Odd	2024	Eliteserien	27	5	2	2	0	0	29	7
Odd	Total		75	15	7	4	0	0	82	19
Omonia	2024–25	Cypriot First Division	2	0	0	0	-		2	0
Omonia	2025–26	Cypriot First Division	0	0	0	0	2 (Note: Appearances in UEFA Conference League)	0	2	0
Omonia	Total		2	0	0	0	2	0	4	0
Kolding	2025–26	Danish 1st Division	1	0	2	0	-		3	0
Kolding	Total		1	0	2	0	0	0	3	0
Career total			210	39	29	14	3	0	242	53
