= Anders Jenssen =

Norwegian footballer (born 1993)

Personal information
- Full name: Anders Finjord Jenssen
- Date of birth: 10 October 1993 (age 33)
- Place of birth: Harstad, Norway
- Height: 1.85 m (6 ft 1 in)
- Position: Centre-back

Youth career
- Medkila

Senior career*
Years	Team	Apps	(Gls)
2010–2011	Medkila		
2012–2013	Harstad	40	(1)
2014	Finnsnes	26	(0)
2015–2018	Tromsdalen	95	(9)
2015	Tromsdalen 2	3	(1)
2019–2025	Tromsø	159	(4)
2019–2024	Tromsø 2	5	(0)
Total		328	(15)
- * Club domestic league appearances and goals as of 2 January 2026

Anders Finjord Jenssen (born 10 October 1993) is a former Norwegian footballer. Hailing from Harstad, Jenssen played for local teams Medkila and Harstad, before moving on to Finnsnes and Tromsdalen, all in the lower divisions in Norway. In 2019 Jenssen made the move to Eliteserien side Tromsø where he played for seven seasons. He announced his retirement from professional football after the 2025 season.

== Career ==
=== Early career ===
Jenssen started his career playing for Medkila's youth setup, before playing two seasons for their senior team. In 2012, eighteen years old, Jenssen made the move to Harstad, playing forty-three games for the club. After two seasons at Harstad, the last one playing in the Norwegian Second Division, Jenssen moved to fellow Second Division side Finnsnes ahead of the 2014 season, where he also went on to captain the team through the season

=== Tromsdalen ===
As the 2014 season drew to a close, Finnsnes announced that Jenssen had signed an extension with the club. However, in early 2015, news broke that no deal had been signed and that Jenssen was training with Tromsdalen. Jenssen confirmed that he wanted to sign with Tromsdalen, and that he didn't expect there to be any problem signing for them. Finnsnes disputed this as they claimed an oral contract had already been struck between the club and Jenssen. On 11 February 2015, Tromsdalen announced that Jenssen had signed on for them, and that the situation with Finnsnes had been resolved.

His first two seasons at Tromsdalen were spent playing in the Norwegian Second Division. Jenssen's first goal for the club was the winning goal in a 2–1 win against Lyn in June 2015. The 2016 season ended with promotion for Tromsdalen, ahead of Jenssens former club Finnsnes. After the promotion, Jenssen played his first season in the Norwegian First Division in 2017, ending the season with twenty-three games and one goal in the league. The following season Jenssen played all but one league game, and also scored four goals in all competitions, as Tromsdalen lost a promotion play-off spot to Nest-Sotra on goal difference.

=== Tromsø ===
After an impressive season for Tromsdalen, Eliteserien side Tromsø signed Jenssen ahead of the 2019 season. Originally Jenssen signed a one year contract with the club, but in October he signed a two-year extension with the club. Jenssen played nineteen games that season, which ended with relegation for Tromsø. His first goal came against Kristiansund in a 5–0 win. After the relegation, head coach Simo Valakari was sacked, and Gaute Helstrup was signed as the new head coach, reuniting Jenssen with his former coach from Tromsdalen. After being promoted back to the Eliteserien after only one season Jenssen played most of the matches for Tromsø in the 2021, 2022, and 2023 seasons.

In late 2023, Jenssen extended his contract again, this time stretching through the 2025 season. In 2024, Jenssen played in all four of Tromsø's UEFA Conference League qualifying games, starting three of them. Ahead of the last game of the 2025 season, Jenssen announced that he was retiring from football, and that the game would be his last. Jenssen started on the bench, but was subbed on with half an hour to play, and was given the captain's armband from Ruben Yttergård Jenssen for his final minutes.

== Personal life ==
While playing football in the lower divisions, Jenssen studied to become a Siviløkonom. After completing his degree he combined playing for Tromsdalen with working at Ernst & Young, but after signing for Tromsø he left to focus on his football career.

== Career statistics ==
As of 2 January 2026

Appearances and goals by club, season and competition
Club	Season	League			National Cup		Europe		Total	
Club	Season	Division	Apps	Goals	Apps	Goals	Apps	Goals	Apps	Goals
Harstad	2012	3. divisjon	18	1	2	0	—		20	1
Harstad	2013	2. divisjon	22	0	1	0	—		23	0
Harstad	Total		40	1	3	0	—		43	1
Finnsnes	2014	2. Divisjon	26	0	2	0	—		28	0
Tromsdalen	2015	2. divisjon	18	2	4	0	—		22	2
Tromsdalen	2016	2. divisjon	25	3	3	0	—		28	3
Tromsdalen	2017	1. divisjon	23	1	1	0	—		24	1
Tromsdalen	2018	1. divisjon	29	3	2	1	—		31	4
Tromsdalen	Total		95	9	10	1	—		105	10
Tromsdalen 2	2015	4. divisjon	3	1	—		—		3	1
Tromsø	2019	Eliteserien	19	1	3	0	—		22	1
Tromsø	2020	1. divisjon	24	0	—		—		24	0
Tromsø	2021	Eliteserien	26	1	2	1	—		28	2
Tromsø	2022	Eliteserien	25	0	3	0	—		28	0
Tromsø	2023	Eliteserien	25	1	5	1	—		30	2
Tromsø	2024	Eliteserien	23	1	1	0	4 (Note: Appearances in UEFA Conference League)	0	28	1
Tromsø	2025	Eliteserien	17	0	2	0	—		19	0
Tromsø	Total		159	4	16	2	4	0	179	6
Tromsø 2	2019	3. divisjon	2	0	—		—		2	0
Tromsø 2	2023	3. divisjon	2	0	—		—		2	0
Tromsø 2	2024	4. divisjon	1	0	—		—		1	0
Tromsø 2	Total		5	0	—		—		5	0
Career total			328	15	31	3	4	0	363	18
