= Jostein Gundersen =

Norwegian footballer (born 1996)

Personal information
- Full name: Jostein Maurstad Gundersen
- Date of birth: 2 April 1996 (age 30)
- Place of birth: Bergen, Norway
- Height: 1.86 m (6 ft 1 in)
- Position: Defender

Team information
- Current team: Bodø/Glimt
- Number: 6

Youth career
- Tromsø

Senior career*
| Years | Team | Apps | (Gls) |
| 2014–2023 | Tromsø | 176 | (14) |
| 2024– | Bodø/Glimt | 52 | (3) |

International career^{‡}
| 2024– | Norway | 2 | (0) |
- * Club domestic league appearances and goals as of 20 November 2026 ‡ National team caps and goals as of 13 September 2024

Jostein Maurstad Gundersen (born 2 April 1996) is a Norwegian professional footballer who plays as a defender for Eliteserien club Bodø/Glimt and the Norway national team.

== Club career ==
On 2 January 2024, Gundersen joined reigning Eliteserien club Bodø/Glimt on a permanent transfer.

== International career ==
Gundersen made his debut for the Norway national team on 5 June 2024 in a friendly against Kosovo. He substituted David Møller Wolfe in the 75th minute of a 3–0 victory at Ullevaal Stadion.

== Career statistics ==
As of match played 20 November 2026

Appearances and goals by club, season and competition
| Club | Season | League | | | Norwegian Cup | | Europe | | Total | |
| Club | Season | Division | Apps | Goals | Apps | Goals | Apps | Goals | Apps | Goals |
|---|---|---|---|---|---|---|---|---|---|---|
| Tromsø | 2014 | Norwegian First Division | 1 | 0 | 0 | 0 | – | | 1 | 0 |
| Tromsø | 2015 | Tippeligaen | 3 | 0 | 0 | 0 | – | | 3 | 0 |
| Tromsø | 2016 | Tippeligaen | 17 | 3 | 4 | 1 | – | | 21 | 4 |
| Tromsø | 2017 | Eliteserien | 21 | 1 | 2 | 1 | – | | 23 | 2 |
| Tromsø | 2018 | Eliteserien | 24 | 3 | 4 | 0 | – | | 28 | 3 |
| Tromsø | 2019 | Eliteserien | 15 | 1 | 0 | 0 | – | | 15 | 1 |
| Tromsø | 2020 | Norwegian First Division | 28 | 2 | 0 | 0 | – | | 28 | 2 |
| Tromsø | 2021 | Eliteserien | 18 | 0 | 2 | 1 | – | | 20 | 1 |
| Tromsø | 2022 | Eliteserien | 23 | 2 | 1 | 0 | – | | 24 | 2 |
| Tromsø | 2023 | Eliteserien | 26 | 2 | 4 | 0 | – | | 30 | 2 |
| Tromsø | Total | | 176 | 14 | 17 | 3 | 0 | 0 | 193 | 17 |
| Bodø/Glimt | 2023 | Eliteserien | – | | – | | 2 (Note: Appearances in UEFA Europa Conference League) | 0 | 2 | 0 |
| Bodø/Glimt | 2024 | Eliteserien | 25 | 2 | 1 | 0 | 20 (Note: Six appearances in UEFA Champions League, fourteen appearances in UEFA Europa League) | 0 | 46 | 2 |
| Bodø/Glimt | 2025 | Eliteserien | 16 | 1 | 1 | 0 | 3 (Note: Appearances in UEFA Champions League) | 0 | 20 | 1 |
| Bodø/Glimt | 2026 | Eliteserien | 11 | 0 | 3 | 0 | 11 | 0 | 25 | 0 |
| Bodø/Glimt | Total | | 52 | 3 | 5 | 0 | 36 | 0 | 93 | 3 |
| Career total | | | 228 | 17 | 22 | 3 | 36 | 0 | 286 | 20 |

== Honours ==
Bodø/Glimt

- Eliteserien: 2024
- Norwegian Football Cup: 2025–26

Individual

- Eliteserien Player of the Month: April 2024
