= Brayan Rojas =

Costa Rican footballer (born 1997)

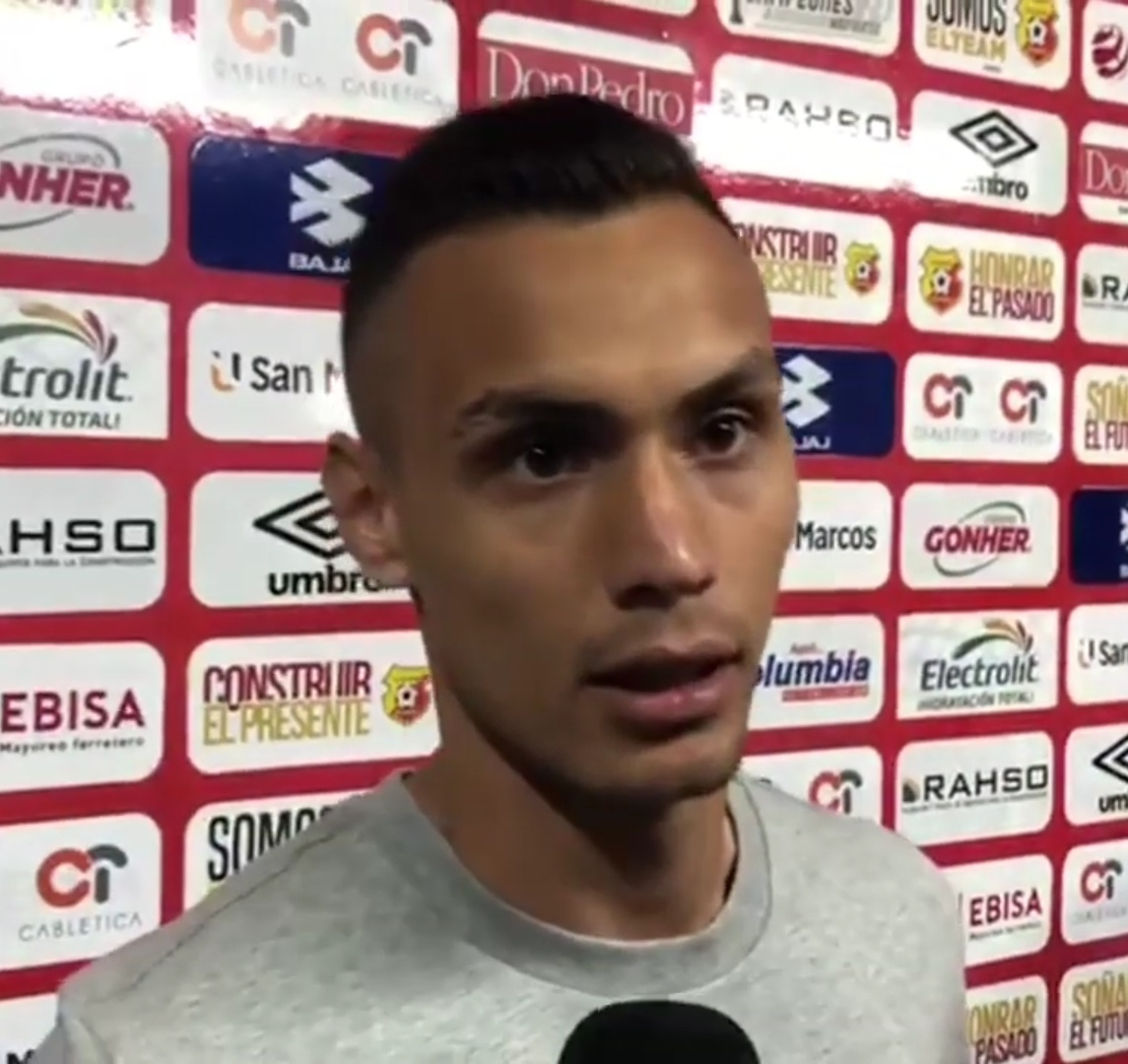

Personal information
- Full name: Brayan Rojas
- Date of birth: 30 November 1997 (age 28)
- Place of birth: Naranjo, Costa Rica
- Height: 1.82 m (5 ft 11 1/2 in)
- Position: Forward

Team information
- Current team: Herediano
- Number: 26

Senior career*
Years	Team	Apps	(Gls)
2015–2019	Carmelita	88	(19)
2019	→ Tromsø (loan)	9	(0)
2020–	Herediano	48	(10)
- * Club domestic league appearances and goals as of 10:17, 22 August 2022 (UTC)

Brayan Rojas (born 30 November 1997) is a Costa Rican footballer who plays for Herediano.

== Career statistics ==
=== Club ===
As of match played 22 September 2019

Appearances and goals by club, season and competition
Club	Season	League			National Cup		Continental		Total	
Club	Season	Division	Apps	Goals	Apps	Goals	Apps	Goals	Apps	Goals
Carmelita	2014–15	Liga FPD	2	0	0	0	-		2	0
Carmelita	2015–16	Liga FPD	17	0	0	0	-		17	0
Carmelita	2016–17	Liga FPD	10	0	0	0	-		10	0
Carmelita	2017–18	Liga FPD	41	7	0	0	-		41	7
Carmelita	2018–19	Liga FPD	18	12	0	0	-		18	12
Carmelita	Total		88	19	0	0	-	-	88	19
Tromsø (loan)	2019	Eliteserien	9	0	3	2	-		12	2
Tromsø (loan)	Total		9	0	3	2	-	-	12	2
Herediano	2019–20	Liga FPD	0	0	0	0	-		0	0
Herediano	Total		0	0	0	0	-	-	0	0
Career total			97	19	3	2	-	-	100	21
