= Sigurd Grønli (footballer) =

Norwegian footballer (born 2000)

Personal information
- Date of birth: 17 October 2000 (age 26)
- Place of birth: Tromsø, Norway
- Height: 1.70 m (5 ft 7 in)
- Positions: Midfielder; forward

Team information
- Current team: Moss
- Number: 21

Youth career
- Skarp
- Fløya
- Tromsø

Senior career*
Years	Team	Apps	(Gls)
2018–2020	Tromsø	12	(0)
2020	→ Grorud (loan)	11	(1)
2021	Tromsdalen	25	(11)
2022–2024	Bryne	64	(8)
2024	→ Start (loan)	14	(0)
2025–	Moss	49	(6)

International career
2018	Norway U18	3	(0)
- * Club domestic league appearances and goals as of 14 November 2026

Sigurd Grønli (born 17 October 2000) is a Norwegian professional footballer who plays as a midfielder for Moss.

== Career ==
=== Tromsø ===
Grønli started his career playing for both Skarp IF and IF Fløya's youth teams. Reaching the age of upper secondary school, Grønli enrolled at the Norwegian School of Elite Sport in Tromsø as well as the academy team of Tromsø IL. In 2017 Grønli signed his first professional contract. His first senior game for the club came in the Norwegian Cup against Skjervøy, where he also scored his first senior goal.

After not playing for Tromsø in the first half of the 2020 season, Grønli was subsequently loaned out to Grorud for the latter half of the season. In his first game, against Sogndal, he also scored his only goal for the Oslo-based club.

After Grønli's contract with Tromsø was terminated, he signed for local club Tromsdalen UIL on a two-year contract. After his first season, he was named "talent of the season" in the 2021 Norwegian Second Division.

=== First Division clubs ===
After one season at Tromsdalen, Grønli signed with 1. divisjon side Bryne on a three-year contract. At the end of Grønli's first season at the club, he was named player of the season by their supporter group "BÆDI". For the latter half of the 2024 season, Grønli was loaned out to Start.

There was no intention of Grønli returning to Bryne, as his contract with Bryne was due to expire. As a free agent, he signed for 1. divisjon side Moss ahead of the 2025 season.

== Playing style ==
Earlier in his career, Grønli preferred to play as a second striker, but later played as a midfielder.

When he signed for Bryne, he was described as "nimble" and "playful" in his playing style.

== Career statistics ==
As of 7 July 2026.

Appearances and goals by club, season and competition
Club	Season	League			National Cup		Other		Total	
Club	Season	Division	Apps	Goals	Apps	Goals	Apps	Goals	Apps	Goals
Tromsø	2018	Eliteserien	7	0	2	1	—		9	1
Tromsø	2019	Eliteserien	5	0	2	1	—		7	1
Tromsø	2020	1. divisjon	0	0	—		—		0	0
Tromsø	Total		12	0	4	2	—		16	2
Grorud (loan)	2020	1. divisjon	11	1	—		—		11	1
Tromsdalen	2021	2. divisjon	25	11	1	1	—		26	12
Bryne	2022	1. divisjon	28	5	3	2	—		31	7
Bryne	2023	1. divisjon	28	3	3	0	1 (Note: Appearance in Eliteserien play-offs)	0	32	3
Bryne	2024	1. divisjon	8	0	4	1	—		12	1
Bryne	Total		64	8	10	3	1	0	75	11
Start (loan)	2024	1. divisjon	14	0	0	0	—		14	0
Moss	2025	1. divisjon	28	5	3	0	2 (Note: Appearance in Norwegian First Division Relegation playoffs)	0	33	5
Moss	2026	1. divisjon	12	1	0	0	0	0	12	1
Moss	Total		40	6	3	0	2	0	45	6
Career total			166	25	18	6	3	0	187	31
