= Romssa Arena =

Football stadium in Tromsø, Norway

Coordinates: 69°38′56″N 18°56′04″E

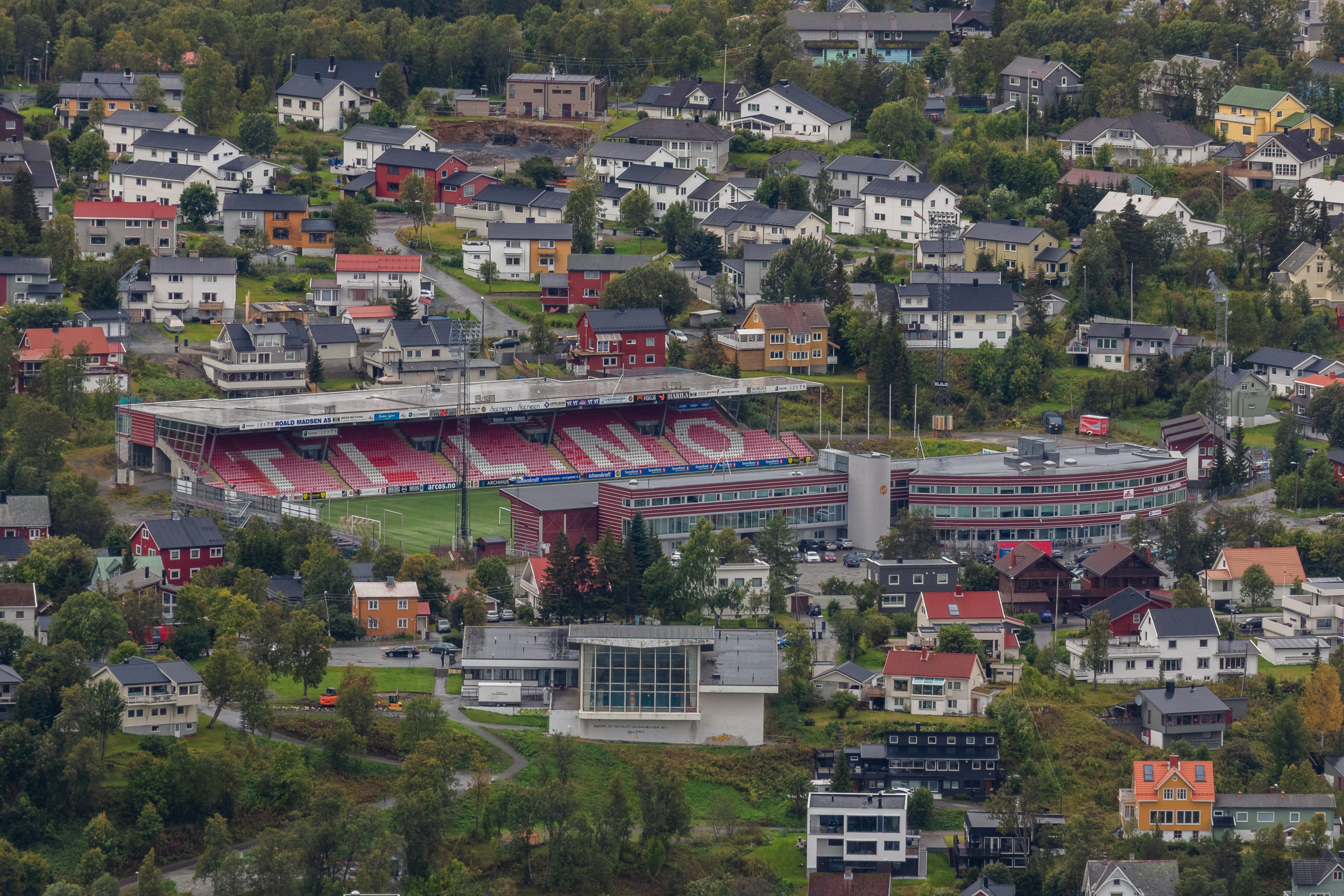
- Romssa Arena, 2019
- Interactive map of Romssa Arena
- Location: Tromsø, Norway
- Owner: Tromsø IL
- Operator: Tromsø IL
- Capacity: 6,687
- Surface: FieldTurf
- Field size: 105 by 68 metres (114.8 yd × 74.4 yd)

Construction
- Opened: 1987

Tenant
- Tromsø IL (1987–present)

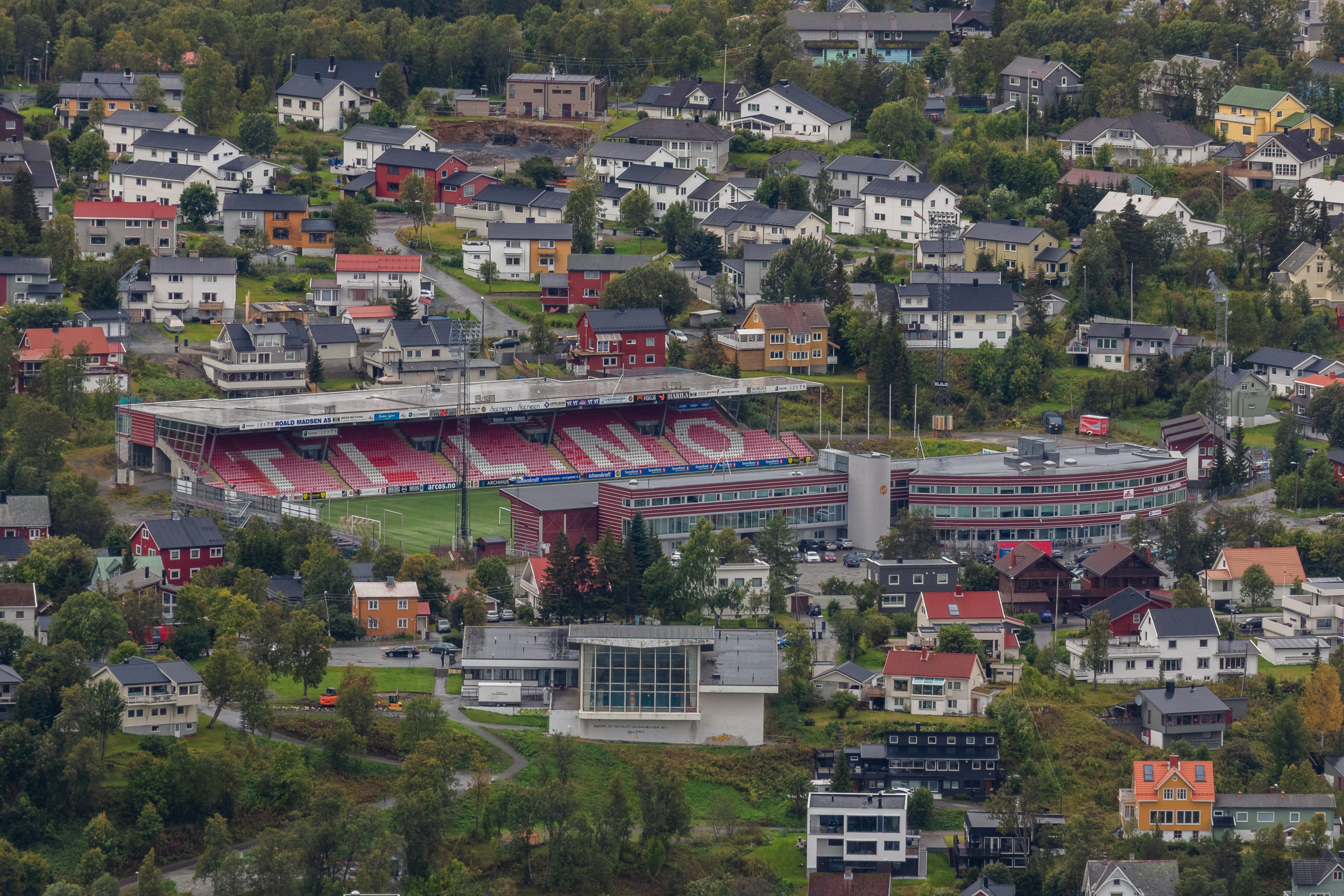
View of the stadium from Mount Fløya.

Romssa Arena, previously known as Alfheim Stadion, is a football stadium located in Tromsø, Norway and home of Eliteserien side Tromsø IL. Romssa Arena has a seating capacity of 6,801 and artificial turf. It is the northernmost stadium to have been used in UEFA competitions.

== History ==
The Alfheim area, previously used as a recreational area, was bought by the municipality in 1954. Construction of the first sports venue began in 1960 at the same time as a new handball and ice hockey field at Nedre Elvebakken. A swimming pool was also built at Alfheim. From the mid-1960s Tromsø had three main football venues: Alfheim, Valhall Stadion and Tromsdalen Stadion. TIL's path to the top league started in the 1970s with the hiring of Peter Drecker as manager. In the early 1980s the team established itself in the Second Division and the need for an upgraded stadium arose. From 1981 to 1986 the club's revenue increased from 1.2 to 4.2 million Norwegian krone (NOK) and the club became professional from 1985. The first major upgrade to a sports complex had been Tromsdalen Stadion in 1983, which was largely financed by the municipality but owned and operated Tromsdalen UIL.

A similar cooperation between the municipality and the club was established in regard to upgrading Alfheim and the stadium was spun off as a separate limited company with TIL as the majority and the municipality as a minority shareholder. The company leased Alfheim for fifteen years and spent NOK 10 million on the Alfheim upgrades. Part of the financing was secured from private donors. Ahead of the 1986 season, the first in the First Division, Tromsø played its matches at Valhall while Alfheim was being upgraded.

TIL played an exhibition match against Germany's 1. FC Nürnberg on 22 July 1987, but chose to play it at Valhall instead of Alfheim to spare the pitch. The opening match took place against England's Queens Park Rangers on 27 July 1987, with TIL losing 0–1 in front of 2,700 spectators. On 26 August Norway's Olympic football team played 0–0 against Switzerland in front of 4,000 spectators. Tromsø played St Mirren on 30 September 1987 in the 1987–88 European Cup Winners' Cup, which became the northernmost location of a European football match. The teams tied 0–0 and Tromsø did not advance. The municipality had to save the stadium company from bankruptcy through a private placement in 1992, thus becoming a majority shareholder. In a 2012 survey carried out by the Norwegian Players' Association among away-team captains, Alfheim was ranked seventh amongst league stadiums, with a score of 3.60 on a scale from one to five.

In 2023 the stadium naming rights were bought for five years by local power company Troms Kraft, who changed the name from Alfheim Stadion to Romssa Arena. Romssa is the Northern Sámi name for Tromsø. The name was chosen to promote Sámi visibility.

== The pitch ==
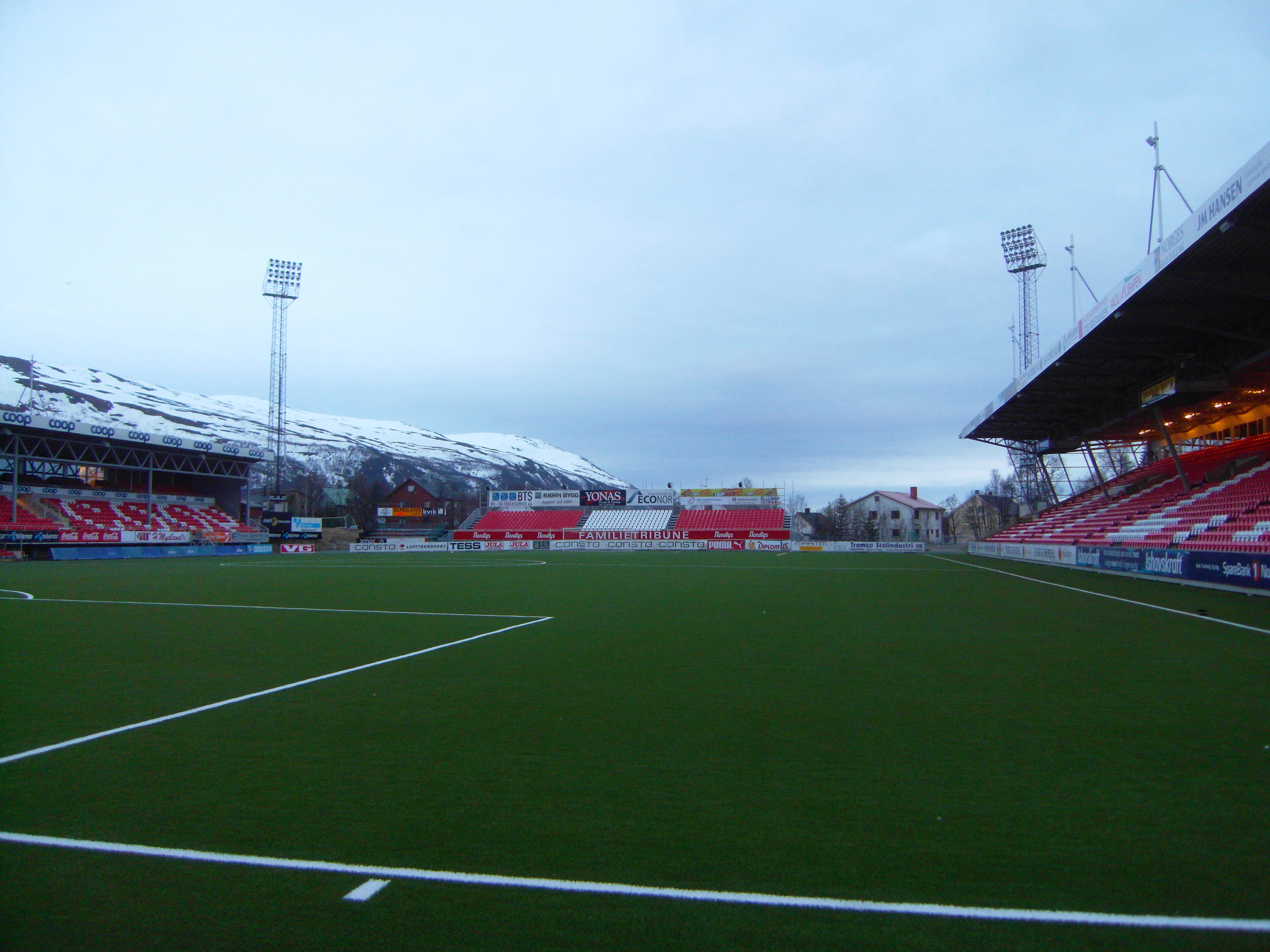
Tromsø's Artificial Pitch

Romssa Arena has a playing surface made of artificial turf with under-soil heating. It had natural grass until 2006. However, the condition of the pitch, especially during the winter months, received considerable criticism from sports pundits and visiting managers. Usually in October, when the Norwegian top division is in its last rounds, winter sets in Tromsø. This, along with the wear and tear from football matches and practicing sessions, caused the grass to disappear and reduced the pitch to a muddy field. To make up for this, Tromsø IL installed artificial turf at the stadium during the 2006 World Cup in Germany. Funding for the turf came from contributions to the club from several businesses in Tromsø, including 7.5 million NOK from an anonymous donor. The artificial turf laid in 2006 was replaced with a new one in June 2010 after taking much criticism.

== The stands ==
The East stand is an all seated covered stand which can accommodate about 2000 people. This stand was built in the mid-eighties and is the oldest stand at Romssa Arena. It houses the clubs offices. At the back of the stand there is a row of executive boxes. Some controversy surrounded the East Stand during the 2004 season. Ringnes, a Norwegian brewery, complained about the clubs S.K. Brann and Tromsø IL being sponsored by the breweries Hansa Borg and Mack Brewery respectively. Advertising for alcohol is illegal in Norway. The result of this complaint for Tromsø IL was that the club had to remove all advertisements for Mack, including the seating arrangement on one of the stands that spelled out Mack. The seats were changed, making the stands spell out "Tack" instead. Tack is a play on words, since it resembles the word Takk, Norwegian for "thank you", a gesture from Tromsø IL thanking Mack for the co-operation through a great deal of years. Ahead of the 2005 season, the former Mack-stands had been renamed to the Coop-stands, being sponsored by the Norwegian convenience store chain Coop. The West Stand was rebuilt during the 2005-season, meaning both sides now are seated and covered. Before the rebuilding the West Stand was an uncovered wooden stand. The West Stand has a capacity of approximately 4000, making it the largest stand at Romssa Arena. There are three media gantries suspended from the roof of the West Stand.

Straddling the middle of the south end and running for two thirds of the length is an uncovered family stand which seats approximately 600 people. Ahead of the 2011 season this stand replaced most of the 1500 capacity temporary uncovered stand. A part of the old stand remains next to the family stand towards the east stand. This part has no seating and can hold about 200 visiting supporters, leaving them with the worst facilities at Romssa Arena. The South Stand is closed for matches in European cup tournaments due to safety regulations imposed by UEFA.

Until August 2007 there was a temporary uncovered stand at the north end which ran for about two thirds of the pitch, this was dismantled to allow place for a stage during a music festival. The north end is now filled with advertising hoardings. In 2010 the scoreboard and stadium clock at the north end were replaced with a large video screen in the north east corner. Set back from the pitch at the north end is TIL-huset, a building that previously housed the teams' changing rooms.

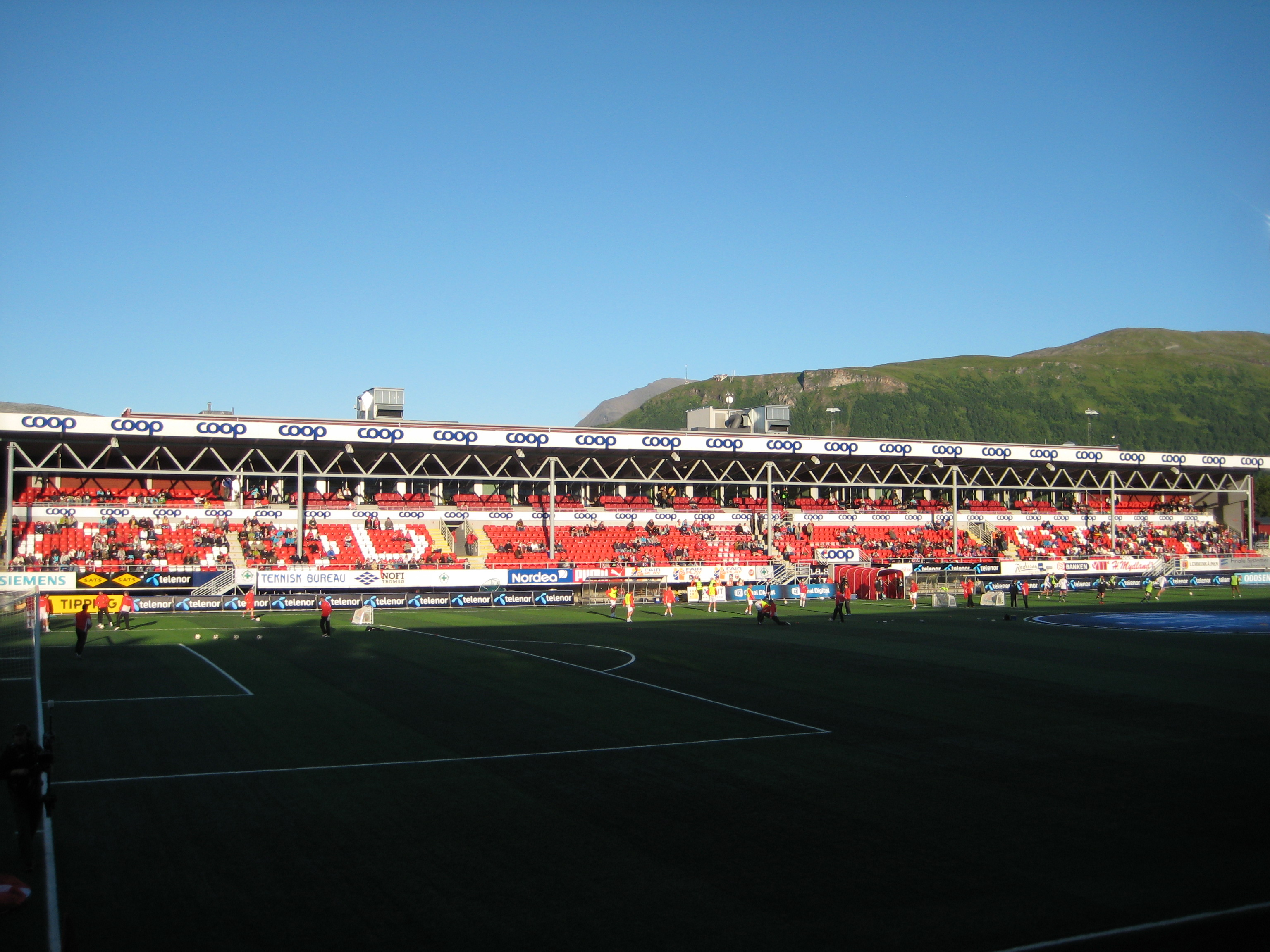
The East Stand

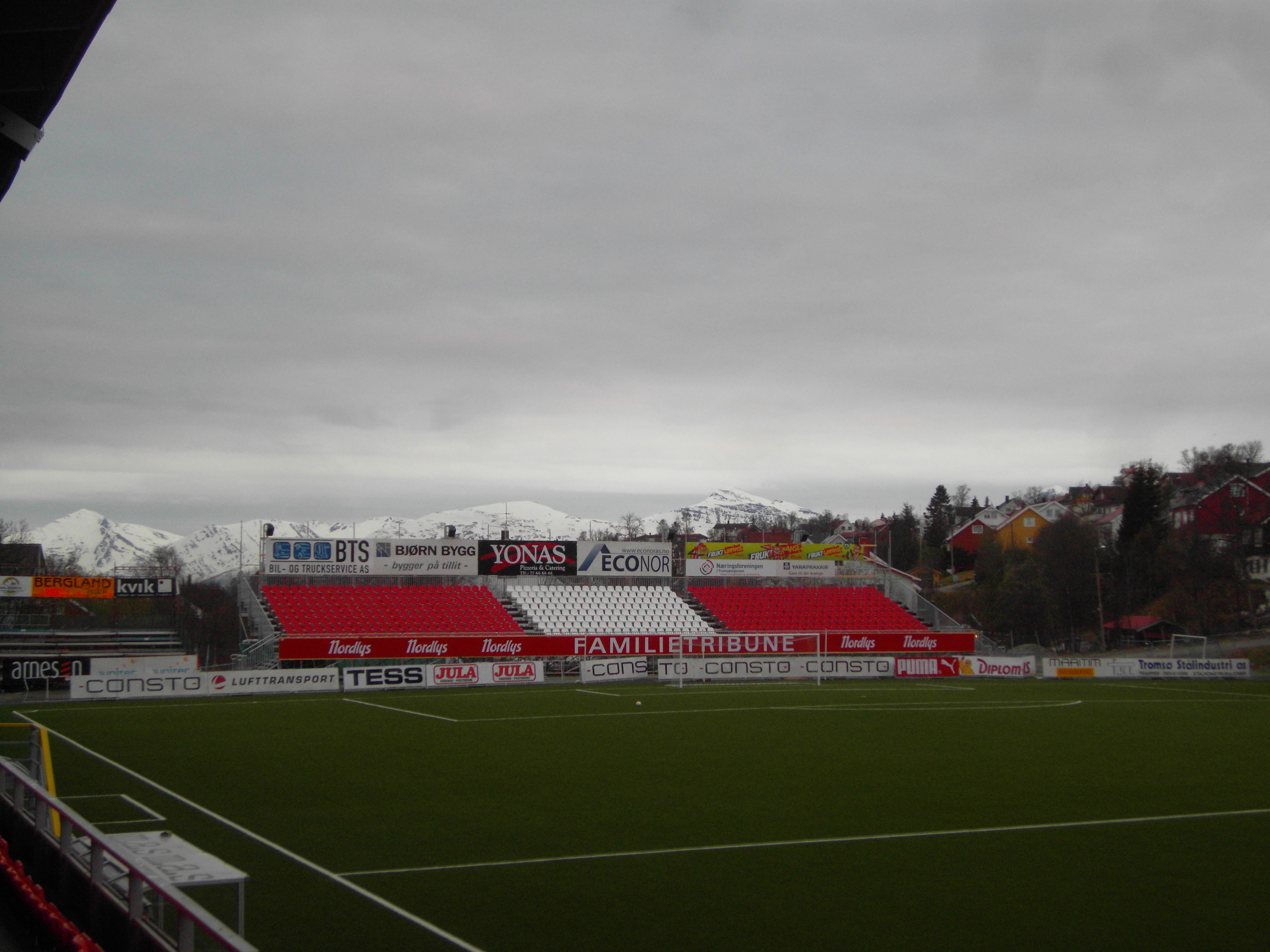
The South Stand

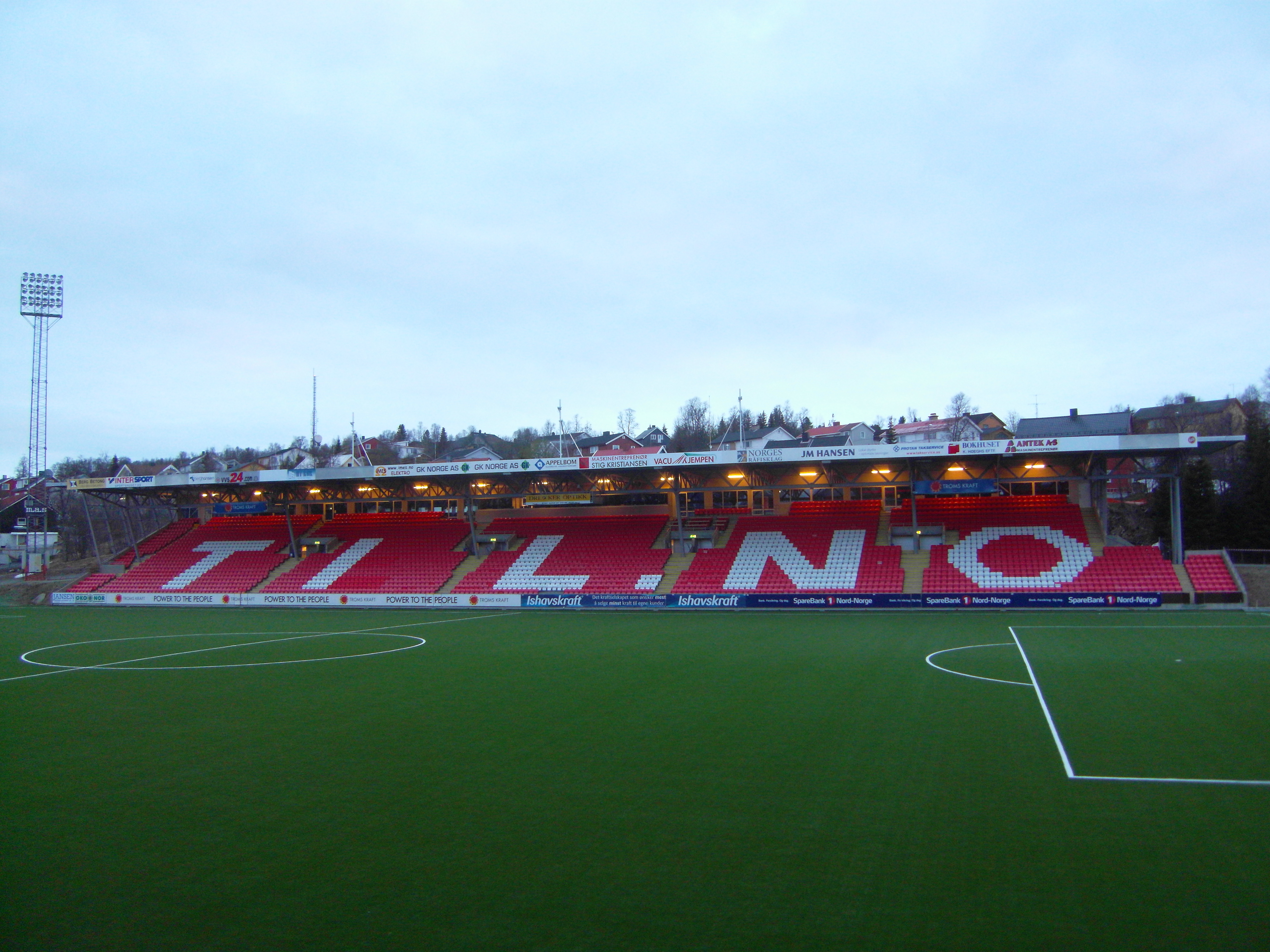
The West Stand

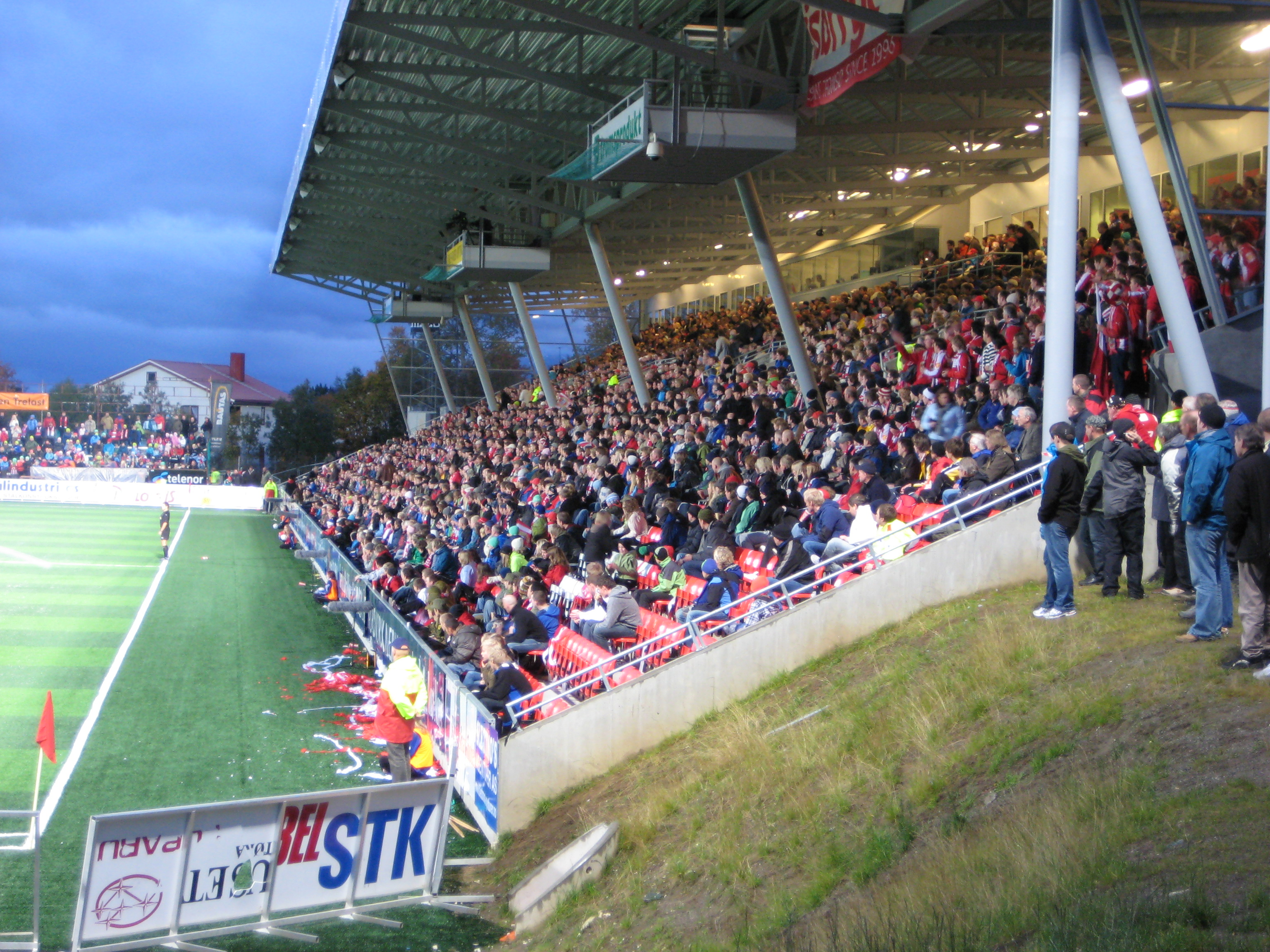
The West Stand on match day

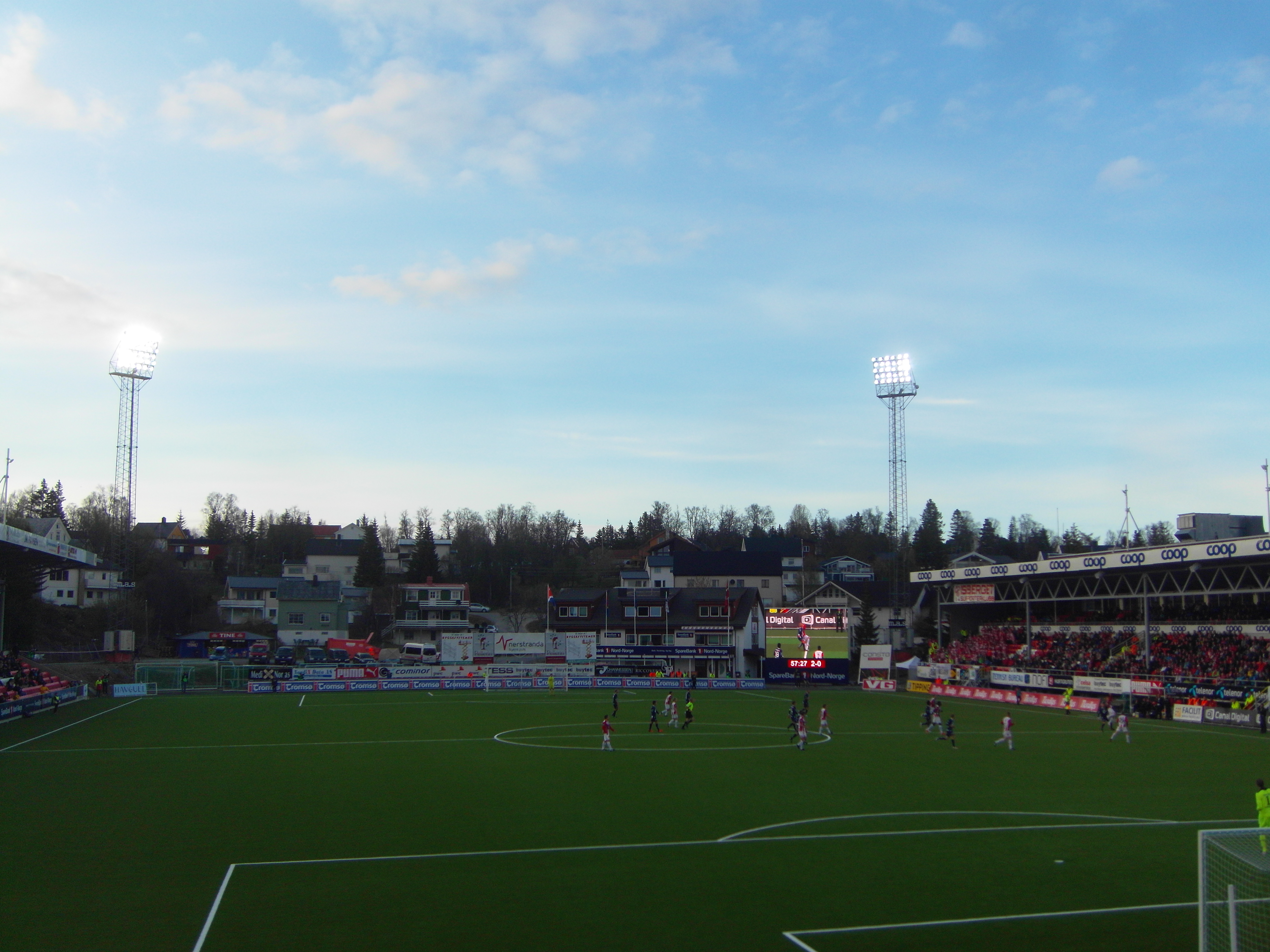
Open North Stand

== Details ==
=== Records ===
Record Attendance: 10,225 v Rosenborg on 15 August 1990 (quarter final in the Norwegian Cup)

== Fort Alfheim ==
Because of Tromsø IL's good home record in many seasons in the Eliteserie (for example, 10 wins in 13 matches in the 2004 season), Romssa Arena has been given the nickname Fort Alfheim, building on the image of the stadium as being impregnable. Chelsea F.C., Galatasaray, Besiktas and Red Star Belgrade have all experienced losing to Tromsø IL away.
