= Mushaga Bakenga =

Norwegian footballer (born 1992)

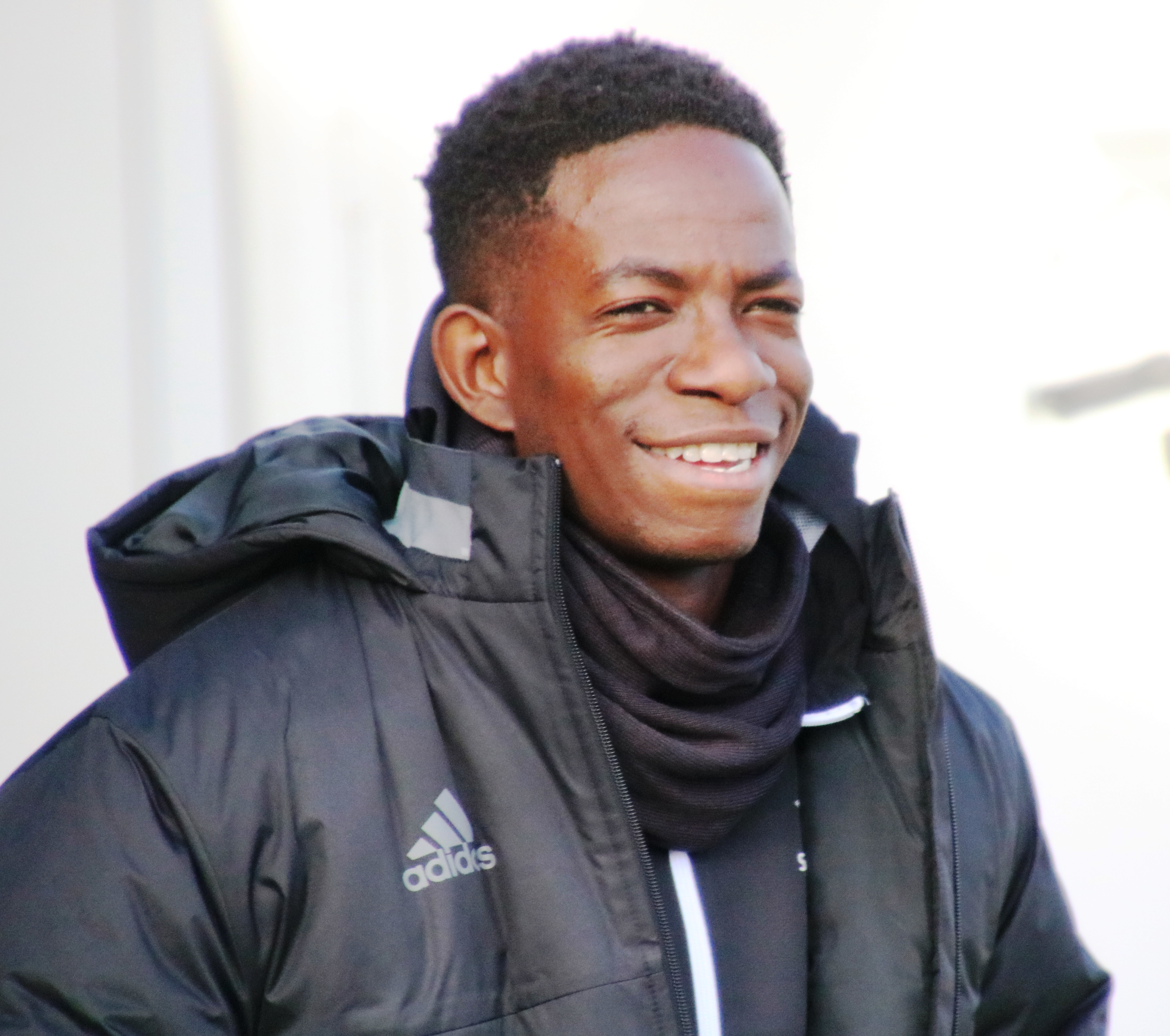
- Bakenga in 2017

Personal information
- Full name: Mushagalusa Bakenga Joar Bahati Namugunga
- Date of birth: 8 August 1992 (age 34)
- Place of birth: Trondheim, Norway
- Height: 1.81 m (5 ft 11 in)
- Position: Forward

Youth career
- 2004: Nationalkameratene

Senior career*
Years	Team	Apps	(Gls)
2005–2006	Nationalkameratene	34	(26)
2007–2008	Rosenborg II	14	(6)
2009–2012	Rosenborg	34	(12)
2012–2016	Club Brugge	8	(1)
2012–2013	→ Cercle Brugge (loan)	27	(7)
2013–2014	→ Esbjerg (loan)	24	(6)
2014–2015	→ Eintracht Braunschweig (loan)	17	(2)
2015–2016	→ Molde (loan)	8	(2)
2016–2017	Rosenborg	19	(8)
2017–2019	Tromsø	41	(5)
2019	→ Ranheim (loan)	12	(2)
2020–2021	Odd	37	(26)
2021–2022	Tokushima Vortis	31	(5)
2023	Stabæk	29	(8)
2023–2024	Apollon Limassol	19	(8)
2024–2025	Punjab	10	(1)

International career
2007	Norway U15	4	(4)
2008	Norway U16	12	(8)
2009	Norway U17	10	(1)
2010	Norway U18	7	(6)
2009–2011	Norway U19	12	(4)
2011–2013	Norway U21	16	(11)
2014	Norway U-23	1	(0)
2014	Norway	1	(0)
- * Club domestic league appearances and goals as of 04:15, 18 December 2024 (UTC)

Mushagalusa Bakenga Joar Bahati Namugunga (born 8 August 1992) is a Norwegian former professional footballer who played as a forward.

== Club career ==
At a very young age Bakenga was spotted, his rise to the first team is testament to his undoubted ability to score goals. From the age of 13 he had averaged over 50 goals a season, with these performances linking him to Bayern Munich and Manchester City. Bakenga began his career with SK Nationalkameratene and joined Rosenborg BK in February 2007. He was on trial with Chelsea's academy in the spring. From 2009 he trained with Rosenborg's senior team twice a week. He also played on the Norwegian u-19 national team, despite not being 17 years old yet. His first selection in the senior squad came in August 2009 against Bodø/Glimt, but he did not play. His actual début in the Tippeligaen came on 23 September 2009 against Tromsø. He nearly scored in the goalless draw—a goal from Bakenga would have secured the league title for Rosenborg.

In 2010, Bakenga was plagued by injuries and played only a few matches for Rosenborg. But, after scoring six times in pre-season, Bakenga secured a position in the starting line-up at the start of 2011 Tippeligaen. He scored Rosenborg's only goal in the loss against Brann, before a wonderful strike against Stabæk. Mush scored 12 league goals in 2011. In January 2012, Hannover 96 offered 10 million NOK (± €1.3m) for Bakenga, but Rosenborg rejected the offer. Later in January, Rosenborg received another offer for Bakenga, this time for €2.6m from Club Brugge. Rosenborg accepted, and Bakenga signed a five-and-a-half-year contract on 28 January. He scored in his debut for Club Brugge, in the 5–1 win against Beerschot on 5 February 2012. It was not only the goal that he will remember from his debut: "I never ran so fast in my life. I did not even have time to explain to the coach what was wrong. Luckily I just made it in time," said Bakenga, having to run to the toilet during his debut match.

Bakenga played in the 2013 Belgian Cup Final, which Cercle lost 2–0 against Genk.

On 8 July 2014, he joined German club Eintracht Braunschweig on a one-year loan deal.

On 18 March 2015, Bakenga cut short his Eintracht Braunschweig loan deal, signing a one-year loan deal with Norwegian champions Molde FK. On 30 March, seven minutes into his first match for Molde FK, he was carried off the pitch with a torn achilles tendon, sidelining him for at least six months.

In July 2016, Bakenga returned to Rosenborg.

In August 2024, Bakenga signed with Indian Super League club Punjab. On 19 December 2024, Punjab FC announced that them and Bakenga had mutually agreed to part ways.

== Charity and activism ==
Bakenga started an organisation called Jabez's World through which he runs a school named College Namugunga in Eastern Congo which has about 1300 students. On 18 September 2024, he won the FIFPro Marcus Rashford Award for championing 'programs and actions that have a positive impact on their communities'.

== International career ==
Bakenga has represented Norway from under-15 level up to under-21 level. He scored a hat-trick for the under-19 team in the match against Moldova U19 in April 2011. Later the same year he made his debut for the under-21 team later the same year. He was not included in the Norwegian squad for the 2013 UEFA European Under-21 Football Championship, but scored four goals for the "new" under-21 team in the match against Poland U21 on 10 June 2013.

== Personal life ==
His parents hail from the Democratic Republic of the Congo. He's the nephew of doctor Denis Mukwege, a Nobel Peace Prize recipient.

== Career statistics ==
As of 20 December 2024

Appearances and goals by club, season and competition
Club	Season	Division	League		Cup		Europe		Total	
Club	Season	Division	Apps	Goals	Apps	Goals	Apps	Goals	Apps	Goals
Rosenborg	2009	Eliteserien	3	0	0	0	–		3	0
Rosenborg	2010	Eliteserien	5	0	1	0	1	0	7	0
Rosenborg	2011	Eliteserien	26	12	3	4	6	0	35	16
Rosenborg	Total		34	12	4	4	7	0	45	16
Club Brugge	2011–12	Belgian Pro League	8	1	0	0	–		8	1
Cercle Brugge (loan)	2012–13	Belgian Pro League	27	7	6	4	–		33	11
Esbjerg (loan)	2013–14	Superliga	24	6	1	2	5	1	30	9
Eintracht Braunschweig (loan)	2014–15	2. Bundesliga	17	2	1	0	–		18	2
Molde (loan)	2015	Eliteserien	6	1	0	0	1	0	7	1
Molde (loan)	2016	Eliteserien	2	1	1	3	–		3	4
Molde (loan)	Total		8	2	1	3	1	0	10	5
Rosenborg	2016	Eliteserien	9	7	3	0	1	0	13	7
Rosenborg	2017	Eliteserien	10	1	3	0	0	0	13	1
Rosenborg	Total		19	8	6	0	1	0	26	8
Tromsø	2017	Eliteserien	8	3	0	0	0	0	8	3
Tromsø	2018	Eliteserien	25	2	2	1	0	0	27	3
Tromsø	2019	Eliteserien	8	0	1	0	0	0	9	0
Tromsø	Total		41	5	3	1	0	0	44	6
Ranheim (loan)	2019	Eliteserien	12	2	1	0	0	0	13	2
Odd	2020	Eliteserien	25	15	–		0	0	25	15
Odd	2021	Eliteserien	11	11	0	0	0	0	11	11
Odd	Total		36	26	0	0	0	0	36	26
Tokushima Vortis	2021	J1 League	9	1	0	0	0	0	9	1
Tokushima Vortis	2022	J2 League	22	4	5	2	0	0	27	6
Tokushima Vortis	Total		31	5	5	2	0	0	36	7
Stabæk	2023	Eliteserien	29	8	4	3	0	0	33	11
Apollon Limassol	2023–24	Cypriot First Division	19	8	3	0	0	0	22	8
Punjab	2024–25	Indian Super League	10	1	0	0	0	0	10	1
Career total			315	93	35	19	14	1	364	113

== Honours ==
Rosenborg

- Tippeligaen and Eliteserien: 2009, 2010, 2016, 2017
- Norwegian Cup: 2016
- Superfinalen / Mesterfinalen: 2010, 2017
- Norwegian U-19 Championship: 2009, 2011

Cercle Brugge

- Belgian Cup runner-up: 2012–13
