= List of Norwegian football transfers winter 2024–25 =

This is a list of Norwegian football transfers in the 2024–25 winter transfer window by club. Only clubs of the 2025 Eliteserien and 2025 Norwegian First Division are included.

== Eliteserien ==
=== Bodø/Glimt ===
In: Note: Flags indicate national team as defined under FIFA eligibility rules; some limited exceptions apply. Players may hold more than one non-FIFA nationality.

No.	Pos.	Nation	Player
5	DF	NOR	Haitam Aleesami (from KFUM)
11	FW	NOR	Ole Didrik Blomberg (from Brann)
23	FW	NOR	Jens Petter Hauge (from (Germany) Eintracht Frankfurt, previously on loan)
77	FW	DEN	Mikkel Bro Hansen (from (Denmark) AGF)
95	FW	DEN	Jeppe Kjær (loan return from Fredrikstad)

Out: Note: Flags indicate national team as defined under FIFA eligibility rules; some limited exceptions apply. Players may hold more than one non-FIFA nationality.

No.	Pos.	Nation	Player
3	DF	NOR	Omar Elabdellaoui (retired)
5	MF	NOR	Brice Wembangomo (to (Sweden) Häcken)
11	FW	NOR	Runar Espejord (to Haugesund)
17	FW	SWE	Samuel Burakovsky (on loan to Lyn)
28	FW	NOR	Oscar Kapskarmo (to Egersund, previously on loan at Kongsvinger)
29	DF	SVK	Michal Tomič (loan return to (Czech Republic) Slavia Prague)
30	DF	DEN	Adam Sørensen (to (Denmark) OB)
33	MF	NOR	Mats Pedersen (to (Denmark) Kolding, previously on loan at Mjøndalen)
77	FW	DEN	Philip Zinckernagel (loan return to (Belgium) Club Brugge)
94	FW	NOR	August Mikkelsen (on loan to Tromsø)
99	FW	SLO	Nino Žugelj (to (Sweden) Djurgården)

=== Brann ===
In: Note: Flags indicate national team as defined under FIFA eligibility rules; some limited exceptions apply. Players may hold more than one non-FIFA nationality.

No.	Pos.	Nation	Player
7	FW	DEN	Mads Hansen (from (Denmark) Nordsjælland)
19	MF	ISL	Eggert Aron Guðmundsson (from (Sweden) Elfsborg)
21	DF	BEL	Denzel De Roeve (from (Belgium) Club Brugge)
41	MF	NOR	Lars Remmem (promoted from junior squad)

Out: Note: Flags indicate national team as defined under FIFA eligibility rules; some limited exceptions apply. Players may hold more than one non-FIFA nationality.

No.	Pos.	Nation	Player
13	DF	DEN	Svenn Crone (to (Denmark) Fredericia)
13	MF	NOR	Isak Tomar Hjorteseth (to Sotra, previously on loan at Sandnes Ulf)
16	FW	NOR	Ole Didrik Blomberg (to Bodø/Glimt)
18	MF	NOR	Sander Kartum (to (Scotland) Hearts)
21	DF	NOR	Ruben Kristiansen (to Tromsø)
22	FW	SWE	Moonga Simba (to (Sweden) Sandviken)
36	GK	NOR	Eirik Holmen (to Strømsgodset)

=== Bryne ===
In: Note: Flags indicate national team as defined under FIFA eligibility rules; some limited exceptions apply. Players may hold more than one non-FIFA nationality.

No.	Pos.	Nation	Player
6	MF	NOR	Remi-André Svindland (from KFUM)
12	GK	NED	Jan de Boer (from (Netherlands) VVV-Venlo)
16	DF	GAM	Dadi Gaye (from Tromsø)
19	DF	DEN	Nicklas Strunck (from (Denmark) Esbjerg)
21	MF	NOR	David Aksnes (promoted from junior squad)
22	MF	NOR	Heine Åsen Larsen (on loan from Tromsø)
29	MF	NOR	Martin Åmodt Lye (promoted from junior squad)

Out: Note: Flags indicate national team as defined under FIFA eligibility rules; some limited exceptions apply. Players may hold more than one non-FIFA nationality.

No.	Pos.	Nation	Player
3	DF	NOR	Pål Aamodt (retired)
6	DF	FRO	Noah Mneney (to (Faroe Islands) HB Tórshavn, previously on loan)
7	MF	NOR	Sigurd Grønli (to Moss, previously on loan at Start)
12	GK	NOR	Sem Bergene (to Lillehammer)
22	DF	NOR	Marius Mattingsdal (on loan to Levanger)

=== Fredrikstad ===
In: Note: Flags indicate national team as defined under FIFA eligibility rules; some limited exceptions apply. Players may hold more than one non-FIFA nationality.

No.	Pos.	Nation	Player
1	GK	NOR	Øystein Øvretveit (from Jerv)
2	DF	SWE	Kennedy Okpaleke (from (Sweden) Lindome)
6	MF	GHA	Leonard Owusu (on loan from (Serbia) Partizan)
7	MF	NOR	Benjamin Faraas (from (Belgium) Club NXT)
9	FW	DEN	Emil Holten (on loan from (Sweden) Elfsborg)
12	DF	NOR	Ulrik Fredriksen (from Haugesund)
15	DF	SEN	Fallou Fall (from (France) Reims, previously on loan)
18	DF	NOR	Ludvig Begby (loan return from Start)
19	MF	EST	Rocco Shein (from (Netherlands) Dordrecht)
20	MF	DEN	Oskar Øhlenschlæger (from (Denmark) Vendsyssel)
21	FW	NOR	Jacob Hanstad (from Lyn)
–	GK	DEN	Valdemar Birksø (from (Denmark) Fredericia)

Out: Note: Flags indicate national team as defined under FIFA eligibility rules; some limited exceptions apply. Players may hold more than one non-FIFA nationality.

No.	Pos.	Nation	Player
1	GK	NOR	Håvar Jenssen (to Sarpsborg 08)
2	DF	SWE	Tim Björkström (to (Sweden) Berga, previously on loan at Moss)
6	DF	NOR	Philip Aukland (to Aalesund)
7	MF	FRO	Brandur Hendriksson (to (Faroe Islands) NSÍ Runavík)
9	FW	NOR	Henrik Kjelsrud Johansen (retired)
10	MF	NOR	Morten Bjørlo (to (Turkey) Konyaspor)
11	FW	GUI	Maï Traoré (to (England) Notts County)
19	MF	ISL	Júlíus Magnússon (to (Sweden) Elfsborg)
20	FW	DEN	Jeppe Kjær (loan return to Bodø/Glimt)
24	MF	NOR	Torjus Engebakken (on loan to Raufoss)
26	DF	DEN	Mads Nielsen (to Stabæk, previously on loan at Aalesund)
28	DF	NOR	Imre Bech Hermansen (on loan to Kjelsås)
29	FW	NOR	Oscar Aga (loan return to Rosenborg)
44	MF	NGR	Samson Tijani (loan return to (Austria) Red Bull Salzburg)
–	FW	SWE	Lucas Lima (to (Belgium) Francs Borains, previously on loan at (Sweden) Utsikten)
–	GK	DEN	Valdemar Birksø (on loan to (Denmark) Fredericia)

=== HamKam ===
In: Note: Flags indicate national team as defined under FIFA eligibility rules; some limited exceptions apply. Players may hold more than one non-FIFA nationality.

No.	Pos.	Nation	Player
2	DF	SWE	Gustav Granath (from (Sweden) Västerås)
6	MF	NOR	Alwande Roaldsøy (on loan from Molde)
8	MF	NOR	Markus Johnsgård (from Tromsø, previously on loan)
17	MF	TUR	Aksel Baran Potur (from Moss)
19	FW	NOR	Kristian Lien (on loan from (Netherlands) Groningen)
20	FW	NOR	Julian Gonstad (loan return from Eidsvold Turn)
25	MF	VEN	David de Ornelas (from Odd 2)
27	DF	NOR	Ola Nikolai Rye (from Grorud)
29	MF	NOR	Olav Mengshoel (promoted from junior squad)
31	GK	NOR	Haakon Bleken Norda (promoted from junior squad)
34	DF	NOR	Mads Orrhaug Larsen (promoted from junior squad)

Out: Note: Flags indicate national team as defined under FIFA eligibility rules; some limited exceptions apply. Players may hold more than one non-FIFA nationality.

No.	Pos.	Nation	Player
1	GK	NOR	Sander Kaldråstøyl Østraat (on loan to Fløy)
2	DF	NOR	Vegard Kongsro (to (Switzerland) Yverdon-Sport)
6	DF	NOR	John Olav Norheim (to Start)
7	MF	NOR	Kristian Lønstad Onsrud (to Stabæk)
9	FW	NOR	Henrik Udahl (on loan to (Poland) Śląsk Wrocław)
19	MF	SWE	William Kurtovic (released)
25	MF	NOR	Jonas Dobloug Rasen (to Grorud)
33	MF	NOR	Leo Haug Utkilen (on loan to Kjelsås)
77	MF	NOR	Mohamed Ofkir (loan return to Vålerenga)

=== Haugesund ===
In: Note: Flags indicate national team as defined under FIFA eligibility rules; some limited exceptions apply. Players may hold more than one non-FIFA nationality.

No.	Pos.	Nation	Player
5	DF	NOR	Ilir Kukleci (from Moss)
7	FW	DEN	Emil Rohd (from (Netherlands) Jong Utrecht)
11	FW	NOR	Runar Espejord (from Bodø/Glimt)
30	FW	CIV	Ismael Petcho Camara (from (Ivory Coast) San Pédro)
38	GK	NOR	Jasper Silva Torkildsen (on loan from Start)
42	DF	NOR	Anders Bondhus (promoted from junior squad)

Out: Note: Flags indicate national team as defined under FIFA eligibility rules; some limited exceptions apply. Players may hold more than one non-FIFA nationality.

No.	Pos.	Nation	Player
1	GK	NOR	Egil Selvik (to (Italy) Udinese)
4	DF	DEN	Anders Bærtelsen (to Viking)
6	DF	NOR	Ulrik Fredriksen (to Fredrikstad)
7	MF	DEN	Mathias Sauer (loan return to (Denmark) AGF)
9	FW	NOR	Sondre Liseth (to (Poland) Górnik Zabrze)
10	MF	NOR	Emir Derviskadic (on loan to (Sweden) Oddevold)
11	FW	TUN	Sebastian Tounekti (to (Sweden) Hammarby)
13	MF	ISL	Anton Logi Lúðvíksson (to (Iceland) Breiðablik)
22	GK	NOR	Aslak Falch (to Sandnes Ulf)
–	DF	NOR	Nikolas Walstad (to Odd, previously on loan at Stabæk)

=== KFUM ===
In: Note: Flags indicate national team as defined under FIFA eligibility rules; some limited exceptions apply. Players may hold more than one non-FIFA nationality.

No.	Pos.	Nation	Player
2	DF	NOR	Daniel Schneider (from Lyn)
5	DF	NOR	Fredrik Berglie (from Sandefjord)
6	MF	NOR	Mansour Sinyan (from (Sweden) Östersund)
19	FW	NOR	Niclas Schjøth Semmen (loan return from Mjøndalen)
21	FW	NOR	Sondre Spieler Halvorsen (loan return from Follo)
22	FW	PHI	Bjørn Martin Kristensen (from Aalesund)

Out: Note: Flags indicate national team as defined under FIFA eligibility rules; some limited exceptions apply. Players may hold more than one non-FIFA nationality.

No.	Pos.	Nation	Player
2	DF	NOR	Haitam Aleesami (to Bodø/Glimt)
5	DF	NOR	Akinsola Akinyemi (to Skeid)
6	MF	NOR	Remi-André Svindland (to Bryne)
12	GK	NOR	Andreas Vedeler (to Bærum, previously on loan)
20	FW	NOR	Yasir Sa'Ad (on loan to Skeid, previously on loan at Grorud)
22	DF	GAM	Dadi Gaye (loan return to Tromsø)
29	DF	NOR	Kristoffer Lassen Harrison (to Moss, previously on loan)
35	GK	NOR	Idar Lysgård (to (Sweden) Vasalund)
43	MF	USA	Adam Saldana (to (United States) Los Angeles FC)
99	FW	NOR	Adama Diomande (released)
—	MF	NOR	Adnan Hadzic (to Skeid, previously on loan at Raufoss)

=== Kristiansund ===
In: Note: Flags indicate national team as defined under FIFA eligibility rules; some limited exceptions apply. Players may hold more than one non-FIFA nationality.

No.	Pos.	Nation	Player
3	DF	DEN	Frederik Flex (from (Italy) Parma Youth)
6	DF	FRA	Axel Guessand (from (Italy) Udinese)
7	FW	NGR	Mustapha Isah (from (Denmark) Randers)
9	FW	NOR	Sander Kilen (from Aalesund)
10	MF	DEN	Rezan Corlu (from (Denmark) Lyngby)
18	MF	NOR	Niklas Ødegård (from Molde)
22	DF	USA	Ian Hoffmann (on loan from (Poland) Lech Poznan)
24	FW	NOR	Awet Alemseged (loan return from Levanger)
30	GK	SEN	Serigne Mor Mbaye (loan return from Sandnes Ulf)

Out: Note: Flags indicate national team as defined under FIFA eligibility rules; some limited exceptions apply. Players may hold more than one non-FIFA nationality.

No.	Pos.	Nation	Player
3	DF	NOR	Christoffer Aasbak (released)
6	DF	NOR	Andreas Hopmark (retired)
7	MF	NOR	Erlend Segberg (to (Italy) Trapani)
9	FW	ISL	Hilmir Rafn Mikaelsson (loan return to (Italy) Venezia)
14	MF	NOR	Jesper Isaksen (to Stabæk)
17	FW	NOR	Kristian Lien (loan return to (Netherlands) Groningen)
22	DF	NOR	Håkon Sjåtil (to Vålerenga)
34	MF	NOR	Andreas Bakeng-Rogne (on loan to Pors)
35	DF	NOR	Isak Hagen Aalberg (on loan to Hønefoss)
37	FW	NOR	Oskar Sivertsen (to (Netherlands) Go Ahead Eagles)

=== Molde ===
In: Note: Flags indicate national team as defined under FIFA eligibility rules; some limited exceptions apply. Players may hold more than one non-FIFA nationality.

No.	Pos.	Nation	Player
1	GK	NOR	Jacob Karlstrøm (loan return from (Sweden) IFK Göteborg)
9	FW	GHA	Jalal Abdullai (on loan from (Sweden) Elfsborg)
11	FW	CIV	Caleb Zady Sery (from (Serbia) Vojvodina)
25	DF	NOR	Filip Heggdal Kristoffersen (promoted from junior squad, previously on loan at Grorud)
26	DF	RSA	Samukele Kabini (from (South Africa) TS Galaxy)
27	MF	NGR	Daniel Daga (from (Nigeria) One Rocket)

Out: Note: Flags indicate national team as defined under FIFA eligibility rules; some limited exceptions apply. Players may hold more than one non-FIFA nationality.

No.	Pos.	Nation	Player
6	MF	NOR	Alwande Roaldsøy (on loan to Hamkam, previously on loan at Sandnes Ulf)
9	FW	DEN	Frederik Ihler (on loan to (Sweden) Elfsborg)
11	FW	NGR	Aaron Samuel (released)
12	GK	NOR	Oliver Petersen (on loan to Kolbotn, previously on loan at Lillestrøm)
25	DF	DEN	Anders Hagelskjær (to (England) Wycombe Wanderers)
27	FW	NOR	Ola Brynhildsen (loan return to (Denmark) Midtjylland)
30	MF	NOR	Leon-Robin Juberg-Hovland (on loan to Træff, previously on loan at Hødd)
31	MF	NOR	Mathias Fjørtoft Løvik (to (Italy) Parma)
32	GK	NOR	Peder Hoel Lervik (on loan to Hødd)
33	MF	NOR	Niklas Ødegård (to Kristiansund)
46	MF	NOR	Andreas Myklebust (on loan to Træff, previously on loan at Kvik Halden)
–	MF	SWE	Harun Ibrahim (to (Sweden) GAIS, previously on loan)

=== Rosenborg ===
In: Note: Flags indicate national team as defined under FIFA eligibility rules; some limited exceptions apply. Players may hold more than one non-FIFA nationality.

No.	Pos.	Nation	Player
8	MF	NOR	Iver Fossum (from (Belgium) Kortrijk)
11	FW	DEN	Noah Sahsah (from (Denmark) FC Copenhagen, previously on loan)
15	DF	DEN	Jonas Mortensen (from (Denmark) Esbjerg)
17	FW	ISL	Ísak Þorvaldsson (loan return from (Iceland) Breiðablik)
22	MF	SWE	Henry Sletsjøe (from (Sweden) Brage)
33	DF	NOR	Tobias Dahl (promoted from junior squad)
39	FW	MNE	Dino Islamović (from (Sweden) Kalmar)

Out: Note: Flags indicate national team as defined under FIFA eligibility rules; some limited exceptions apply. Players may hold more than one non-FIFA nationality.

No.	Pos.	Nation	Player
3	DF	SWE	Jonathan Augustinsson (released)
7	MF	NOR	Markus Henriksen (Retired)
11	FW	CAN	Jayden Nelson (to (Canada) Vancouver Whitecaps, previously on loan at (Germany) SSV Ulm 1846)
20	MF	NOR	Edvard Tagseth (to (United States) Nashville)
25	DF	SWE	Adam Andersson (to (Denmark) Lyngby)
29	FW	NOR	Oscar Aga (on loan to (Sweden) Helsingborg, previously on loan at Fredrikstad)
33	DF	NOR	Tobias Dahl (on loan to Moss)
40	FW	NOR	Pawel Chrupalla (to (Sweden) Halmstad, previously on loan at Sarpsborg 08)
44	FW	NOR	Magnus Holte (on loan to Hødd)

=== Sandefjord ===
In: Note: Flags indicate national team as defined under FIFA eligibility rules; some limited exceptions apply. Players may hold more than one non-FIFA nationality.

No.	Pos.	Nation	Player
2	DF	SWE	Zinedin Smajlovic (from (Sweden) Sandviken)
7	FW	BEL	Evangelos Patoulidis (from (Finland) Haka)
8	MF	SWE	Robin Dzabic (from (Sweden) Landskrona)
13	GK	BIH	Alem Omerinović (promoted from junior squad)
19	FW	NOR	Bendik Berntsen (promoted from junior squad)
21	MF	NOR	Jakob Swift (promoted from junior squad)
24	FW	NOR	Sebastian Holm Mathisen (loan return from Eik Tønsberg)
30	GK	SYR	Elias Hadaya (from (Sweden) Utsikten)
31	DF	NOR	Henrik Skretteberg (promoted from junior squad)

Out: Note: Flags indicate national team as defined under FIFA eligibility rules; some limited exceptions apply. Players may hold more than one non-FIFA nationality.

No.	Pos.	Nation	Player
1	GK	FIN	Hugo Keto (to (Sweden) Värnamo)
2	DF	NOR	Fredrik Berglie (to KFUM)
7	MF	NOR	Eman Markovic (loan return to (Sweden) IFK Göteborg)
8	MF	SWE	Aleksander Damnjanovic Nilsson (to (Sweden) Halmstad)
9	FW	NOR	Alexander Ruud Tveter (released)
16	FW	NOR	Wally Njie (released)
21	MF	SYR	Simon Amin (to (Serbia) Radnički Niš)
99	DF	GAM	Maudo Jarjué (to (North Macedonia) Struga)

=== Sarpsborg 08 ===
In: Note: Flags indicate national team as defined under FIFA eligibility rules; some limited exceptions apply. Players may hold more than one non-FIFA nationality.

No.	Pos.	Nation	Player
3	DF	IRQ	Mohanad Jeahze (from Lillestrøm)
11	FW	NOR	Daniel Karlsbakk (from (Netherlands) Heerenveen)
12	GK	NOR	Tord Flolid (on loan from Sandnes Ulf)
18	MF	DEN	Mike Vestergård (from (Denmark) Kolding)
31	GK	NOR	Håvar Jenssen (from Fredrikstad)
70	MF	NOR	Jakob Auby (loan return from Ørn Horten)
80	MF	NOR	Szymon Roguski (promoted from junior squad)

Out: Note: Flags indicate national team as defined under FIFA eligibility rules; some limited exceptions apply. Players may hold more than one non-FIFA nationality.

No.	Pos.	Nation	Player
10	MF	NOR	Stefan Johansen (released)
11	MF	SWE	Simon Tibbling (to (Iceland) Fram)
12	GK	NOR	Jarik Sundling (to Moss, previously on loan)
18	MF	NOR	Håvard Huser Åsheim (released)
21	GK	NOR	Anders Kristiansen (retired, previously on loan at (Sweden) IFK Göteborg)
25	MF	NOR	Jesper Gregersen (on loan to Aalesund)
26	FW	NGR	Daniel Job (on loan to Egersund)
31	MF	SEN	Amidou Diop (loan return to Aalesund)
37	FW	NOR	Pawel Chrupalla (loan return to Rosenborg)
40	GK	NOR	Leander Øy (on loan to Mjøndalen)
98	FW	NOR	Rafik Zekhnini (to Odd)

=== Strømsgodset ===
In: Note: Flags indicate national team as defined under FIFA eligibility rules; some limited exceptions apply. Players may hold more than one non-FIFA nationality.

No.	Pos.	Nation	Player
15	MF	NOR	Andreas Heredia-Randen (loan return from Mjøndalen)
16	MF	NOR	Fredrik Ardraa (promoted from junior squad)
24	GK	NOR	Eirik Holmen (from Brann)

Out: Note: Flags indicate national team as defined under FIFA eligibility rules; some limited exceptions apply. Players may hold more than one non-FIFA nationality.

No.	Pos.	Nation	Player
20	MF	GHA	Emmanuel Danso (to Stabæk)
30	DF	NOR	Fabian Holst-Larsen (to Mjøndalen, previously on loan)
32	GK	NOR	Frank Stople (on loan to (Sweden) Östersund)

=== Tromsø ===
In: Note: Flags indicate national team as defined under FIFA eligibility rules; some limited exceptions apply. Players may hold more than one non-FIFA nationality.

No.	Pos.	Nation	Player
3	DF	NOR	Jesper Robertsen (loan return from Sogndal)
9	FW	POR	Ieltsin Camões (from (Sweden) Brage)
14	FW	NOR	Sigurd Prestmo (from Ranheim)
17	DF	NOR	Filip Oprea (from Kjelsås)
17	FW	NOR	August Mikkelsen (on loan from Bodø/Glimt)
18	FW	NOR	Daniel Braut (on loan from Sandnes Ulf)
24	DF	NOR	Ruben Kristiansen (from Brann)
25	DF	GAM	Abubacarr Sedi Kinteh (from (Senegal) Mawade Wade)
27	GK	NOR	Ole Kristian Lauvli (from Raufoss)
32	GK	NOR	Mats Trige (loan return from Alta)

Out: Note: Flags indicate national team as defined under FIFA eligibility rules; some limited exceptions apply. Players may hold more than one non-FIFA nationality.

No.	Pos.	Nation	Player
9	FW	NOR	Lasse Nordås (to (England) Luton Town)
14	DF	SEN	Mamadou Thierno Barry (to (Belgium) Union Saint Gilloise)
16	DF	FIN	Miika Koskela (on loan to (Finland) AC Oulu)
17	DF	NOR	Filip Oprea (on loan to Egersund)
18	MF	NOR	Markus Johnsgård (to HamKam, previously on loan)
19	MF	NOR	Heine Åsen Larsen (on loan to Bryne)
25	DF	NOR	Lasse Nilsen (released)
26	DF	NOR	Isak Vik (on loan to Mjøndalen, previously on loan at Tromsdalen)
27	FW	SEN	Yoro Ba (to (Senegal) Academie Bloc 16 Diamamague, previously on loan at Sogndal)
28	DF	FRA	Christophe Psyché (released)
29	FW	NOR	Sean Nilsen-Modebe (on loan to Tromsdalen)
30	DF	NOR	Isak Vådebu (on loan to Åsane)
—	DF	NOR	Oskar Opsahl (released)
—	DF	GAM	Dadi Gaye (to Bryne, previously on loan at KFUM)
—	DF	NOR	Tobias Vonheim Norbye (on loan to Alta)
—	FW	NOR	Elias Aarflot (on loan to Raufoss)

=== Viking ===
In: Note: Flags indicate national team as defined under FIFA eligibility rules; some limited exceptions apply. Players may hold more than one non-FIFA nationality.

No.	Pos.	Nation	Player
4	DF	NOR	Martin Ove Roseth (from Lillestrøm)
13	GK	NOR	Kristoffer Klaesson (from (Denmark) AGF)
19	MF	NOR	Kristoffer Askildsen (from (Denmark) Midtjylland)
21	DF	DEN	Anders Bærtelsen (from Haugesund)
25	DF	NOR	Henrik Falchener (from Egersund)
28	FW	ISL	Hilmir Rafn Mikaelsson (from (Italy) Venezia)
30	GK	NOR	Jakob Storevik (on loan from Vålerenga)
30	GK	NOR	Thomas Kinn (from Mjøndalen)
33	MF	NOR	Jakob Segadal Hansen (promoted from B team)
35	DF	NOR	Tobias Moi (promoted from junior squad)
—	MF	NOR	Ola Visted (promoted from junior squad)

Out: Note: Flags indicate national team as defined under FIFA eligibility rules; some limited exceptions apply. Players may hold more than one non-FIFA nationality.

No.	Pos.	Nation	Player
4	DF	NOR	Sondre Klingen Langås (to (England) Derby County)
9	FW	NOR	Lars-Jørgen Salvesen (to (England) Derby County)
13	MF	SWE	Hampus Finndell (to (Sweden) Djurgården)
16	MF	NOR	Kristoffer Løkberg (retired)
30	GK	NOR	Jakob Storevik (loan return to Vålerenga)
34	DF	NOR	Kristoffer Forgaard Paulsen (retired, previously on loan at Sogndal)
41	DF	NOR	Jone Berg (retired)
51	GK	NOR	Aksel Bergsvik (on loan to Sandviken)
—	MF	NOR	Ola Visted (on loan to Hødd)

=== Vålerenga ===
In: Note: Flags indicate national team as defined under FIFA eligibility rules; some limited exceptions apply. Players may hold more than one non-FIFA nationality.

No.	Pos.	Nation	Player
1	GK	NOR	Jakob Storevik (loan return from Viking)
3	DF	NOR	Håkon Sjåtil (from Kristiansund)
5	DF	DEN	Kevin Tshiembe (from (Denmark) Brøndby)
11	FW	DEN	Elias Sørensen (from (England) Portsmouth)
16	DF	FIN	Noah Pallas (from (Finland) HJK Helsinki)
27	DF	BRA	Vinícius Nogueira (on loan from (Sweden) Halmstad)

Out: Note: Flags indicate national team as defined under FIFA eligibility rules; some limited exceptions apply. Players may hold more than one non-FIFA nationality.

No.	Pos.	Nation	Player
1	GK	NOR	Jakob Storevik (on loan to Viking)
3	DF	NOR	Aleksander Hammer Kjelsen (to Aalesund)
5	DF	COD	Nathan Fasika (loan return to (South Africa) Cape Town City)
13	GK	NOR	Magnus Stær-Jensen (to Kjelsås, previously on loan to Strømmen)
17	FW	NOR	Jacob Eng (retired)
18	DF	NOR	Simen Juklerød (to (Belgium) Sint-Truiden)
19	FW	NOR	Ola Kamara (released)
25	FW	NOR	Jones El-Abdellaoui (to (Spain) Celta)
30	GK	NOR	Storm Strand-Kolbjørnsen (to Start)
–	MF	NOR	Mohamed Ofkir (on loan to (South Korea) Suwon, previously on loan at Hamkam)

== 1. divisjon ==
=== Aalesund ===
In: Note: Flags indicate national team as defined under FIFA eligibility rules; some limited exceptions apply. Players may hold more than one non-FIFA nationality.

No.	Pos.	Nation	Player
2	DF	NOR	Marius Andresen (from Moss)
3	DF	ISL	Ólafur Guðmundsson (from (Iceland) FH)
5	DF	NOR	Aleksander Hammer Kjelsen (from Vålerenga)
14	MF	DEN	Mathias Kristensen (from (Denmark) Hobro)
15	MF	NOR	Jesper Gregersen (on loan from Sarpsborg 08)
19	FW	DEN	Frederik Heiselberg (from (Denmark) Midtjylland)
29	DF	NOR	Jørgen Bøe (from Træff)
45	DF	NOR	Philip Aukland (from Fredrikstad)

Out: Note: Flags indicate national team as defined under FIFA eligibility rules; some limited exceptions apply. Players may hold more than one non-FIFA nationality.

No.	Pos.	Nation	Player
2	DF	DEN	Mads Nielsen (loan return to Fredrikstad)
3	DF	CRO	Vinko Međimorec (loan return to (Croatia) Slaven Belupo)
4	DF	NOR	Nikolai Hopland (to (Netherlands) Heerenveen, previously on loan)
13	GK	DEN	Andreas Gülstorff (loan return to (Denmark) Nordsjælland)
15	FW	NOR	Sander Kilen (to Kristiansund)
17	FW	NOR	Noah Solskjær (on loan to Brattvåg)
18	FW	NOR	Martin Ramsland (to Arendal)
20	DF	MKD	Metodi Maksimov (loan return to (Austria) LASK)
21	MF	SEN	Amidou Diop (to (Faroe Islands) TB, previously on loan at Sarpsborg 08)
22	MF	SWE	Marcus Rafferty (loan return to (Sweden) Hammarby)
28	MF	NOR	Eivind Kolve (on loan to Levanger)
29	FW	PHI	Bjørn Martin Kristensen (to KFUM)
34	DF	NOR	Stian Aarønes Holte (to Hønefoss, previously on loan at Follo)
36	MF	NOR	John Ruud Norvik (to Brattvåg)
44	DF	USA	Sam Rogers (loan return to Lillestrøm)
–	FW	GHA	Isaac Atanga (to (Sweden) Kalmar, previously on loan at (Finland) Ilves)

=== Egersund ===
In: Note: Flags indicate national team as defined under FIFA eligibility rules; some limited exceptions apply. Players may hold more than one non-FIFA nationality.

No.	Pos.	Nation	Player
1	GK	NOR	Mats Viken (free transfer)
1	GK	DEN	Andreas Hermansen (on loan from (Denmark) Horsens)
2	DF	NOR	Herman Kleppa (from Sandnes Ulf)
5	DF	NOR	Nicolas Pignatel Jenssen (from Start)
7	FW	SWE	Othmane Salama (from (Sweden) Trelleborg)
9	FW	NOR	Oscar Kapskarmo (from Bodø/Glimt)
12	GK	NOR	Peder Klausen (from Odd)
13	MF	SWE	Paya Pichkah (on loan from (Sweden) Brommapojkarna)
14	DF	NOR	Filip Oprea (on loan from Tromsø)
20	MF	NOR	Petter Hokstad (from Eidsvold Turn)
27	MF	NOR	Scott Vatne (from (United States) Elon Phoenix)
28	FW	NGR	Daniel Job (on loan from Sarpsborg 08)
31	MF	SWE	Isak Jönsson (from (Sweden) Västerås)
37	FW	GHA	Mustapha Abu (from (Ghana) African Football Talent Academy)
45	MF	DEN	Mathias Sauer (on loan from (Denmark) AGF)
–	DF	NOR	Philip Hovland (from Vidar)

Out: Note: Flags indicate national team as defined under FIFA eligibility rules; some limited exceptions apply. Players may hold more than one non-FIFA nationality.

No.	Pos.	Nation	Player
1	GK	NOR	Mats Viken (released)
2	DF	NOR	Ådne Midtskogen (to Lyn)
4	DF	NOR	Henrik Falchener (to Viking)
5	DF	NOR	Keivan Ghaedamini (to Skeid)
7	FW	SWE	Jack Lahne (to Austria Lustenau)
9	FW	NOR	Jørgen Galta (loan return to Viking 2)
12	DF	NOR	Robert Williams (to (Faroe Islands) KÍ)
14	DF	NOR	Jo Stålesen (to Lyn)
16	MF	NOR	Sivert Strangstad (loan return to Jerv)
23	FW	NOR	Magnus Høiseth (to Levanger)
31	GK	NOR	Knut-André Skjærstein (released)
77	FW	SWE	Jørgen Voilås (to (Sweden) Umeå)
99	FW	NOR	Joacim Holtan (loan return to Kongsvinger)
–	DF	NOR	Philip Hovland (on loan to Vidar)

=== Hødd ===
In: Note: Flags indicate national team as defined under FIFA eligibility rules; some limited exceptions apply. Players may hold more than one non-FIFA nationality.

No.	Pos.	Nation	Player
2	DF	NOR	Noah Riise (from Ørn Horten)
3	DF	NOR	Sondre Fosnæss Hansen (from Levanger)
11	MF	NOR	Andreas Waterfield Skjold (from Notodden)
14	DF	SWE	Marcus Mikhail (from (Sweden) Skövde)
18	MF	NOR	Ola Visted (on loan from Viking 2)
19	FW	NOR	Magnus Holte (on loan from Rosenborg)
25	GK	NOR	Marius Ulla (from Stabæk)
26	GK	NOR	Peder Hoel Lervik (on loan from Molde)

Out: Note: Flags indicate national team as defined under FIFA eligibility rules; some limited exceptions apply. Players may hold more than one non-FIFA nationality.

No.	Pos.	Nation	Player
2	DF	NOR	Trace Murray (to Hønefoss)
14	DF	NOR	Olai Bjørdal (to Volda)
19	MF	NOR	Uranik Seferi (loan return to Lillestrøm)
24	MF	NOR	Leon-Robin Juberg-Hovland (loan return to Molde)
25	GK	LAT	Deniss Korneičiks (to Staal)
26	MF	NOR	Iver Husø Johansen (to Volda)
30	GK	NOR	Eirik Bjørnevik (to Brattvåg)

=== Kongsvinger ===
In: Note: Flags indicate national team as defined under FIFA eligibility rules; some limited exceptions apply. Players may hold more than one non-FIFA nationality.

No.	Pos.	Nation	Player
3	DF	NED	Pim Saathof (on loan from (Netherlands) Go Ahead Eagles)
18	FW	NOR	Joacim Holtan (loan return from Egersund)
24	FW	NOR	Armand Øverby (promoted from junior squad)
28	FW	NOR	Rasmus Opdal Christiansen (loan return from Arendal)
93	GK	RUS	Aleksei Gorodovoy (free transfer)

Out: Note: Flags indicate national team as defined under FIFA eligibility rules; some limited exceptions apply. Players may hold more than one non-FIFA nationality.

No.	Pos.	Nation	Player
3	DF	ISL	Róbert Orri Þorkelsson (loan return to (Canada) CF Montreal)
9	FW	NOR	Adem Güven (retired)
10	DF	LUX	Lars Krogh Gerson (to (Luxembourg) Progrès Niederkorn)
16	DF	NOR	Marius Trengereid (on loan to Arendal, previously on loan at Jerv)
31	GK	CIV	Sayouba Mandé (released)
32	FW	NOR	Oscar Kapskarmo (loan return to Bodø/Glimt)
41	GK	NOR	Anders Klemensson (to Raufoss)

=== Lillestrøm ===
In: Note: Flags indicate national team as defined under FIFA eligibility rules; some limited exceptions apply. Players may hold more than one non-FIFA nationality.

No.	Pos.	Nation	Player
9	FW	NGR	Kparabo Ariheri (from (Nigeria) )
14	FW	ENG	Jubril Adedeji (on loan from (Denmark) AaB)
15	FW	GAM	Salieu Drammeh (from (Denmark) Frem)
21	DF	NGR	Tochukwu Joseph Ogboji (from (Nigeria) Purple Known)
32	MF	NOR	Harald Woxen (promoted from junior squad)
90	MF	NOR	El Schaddai Furaha (loan return from Raufoss)

Out: Note: Flags indicate national team as defined under FIFA eligibility rules; some limited exceptions apply. Players may hold more than one non-FIFA nationality.

No.	Pos.	Nation	Player
3	DF	NOR	Martin Ove Roseth (to Viking)
5	DF	IRQ	Mohanad Jeahze (to Sarpsborg 08)
7	FW	NOR	Ylldren Ibrahimaj (to (Czech Republic) Mladá Boleslav)
8	MF	NOR	Marius Lundemo (to (Iceland) Valur)
9	FW	SWE	Jabir Abdihakim Ali (loan return to (Sweden) Västerås)
14	FW	CIV	Mathis Bolly (released)
15	MF	NOR	Erling Knudtzon (released)
16	DF	NGR	Uba Charles Nwokoma (on loan to (Sweden) Mjällby)
18	MF	SWE	August Karlin (to (Sweden) Olympic)
22	MF	NOR	Elias Solberg (on loan to Eidsvold Turn)
25	MF	NOR	Leandro Neto (on loan to Mjøndalen)
26	FW	NOR	Oliver Odde Henriksrud (to Pors, previously on loan at Strømmen)
27	MF	NOR	Uranik Seferi (to Tromsdalen, previously on loan at Hødd)
29	GK	NOR	Jørgen Sveinhaug (to Levanger)
31	GK	NOR	Oliver Petersen (loan return to Molde)
38	FW	NOR	Alexander Røssing-Lelesiit (to (Germany) Hamburger SV)
–	DF	USA	Sam Rogers (to (United States) Chicago Fire, previously on loan at Aalesund)

=== Lyn ===
In: Note: Flags indicate national team as defined under FIFA eligibility rules; some limited exceptions apply. Players may hold more than one non-FIFA nationality.

No.	Pos.	Nation	Player
2	DF	NOR	Jo Stålesen (from Egersund)
6	DF	NOR	Ådne Midtskogen (from Egersund)
7	FW	SWE	Samuel Burakovsky (on loan from Bodø/Glimt)
12	GK	NOR	Jesper Nesbakk Wold (from Ullern)
17	DF	NOR	Davod Arzani (from Ull/Kisa)
19	MF	NOR	Tobias Myhre (loan return from Ull/Kisa)
55	DF	NOR	Sander Amble Haugen (from Ranheim)

Out: Note: Flags indicate national team as defined under FIFA eligibility rules; some limited exceptions apply. Players may hold more than one non-FIFA nationality.

No.	Pos.	Nation	Player
2	DF	NOR	Jonas Skulstad (to Asker)
3	DF	NOR	Jørgen Sjøl (to Odd)
6	DF	NOR	Daniel Schneider (to KFUM)
7	MF	NOR	Henrik Loholt Kristiansen (released)
15	DF	NOR	Alexander Rønning-Olsen (released)
20	FW	NOR	Jacob Hanstad (to Fredrikstad)
22	DF	NOR	Håvard Meinseth (to Kjelsås)

=== Mjøndalen ===
In: Note: Flags indicate national team as defined under FIFA eligibility rules; some limited exceptions apply. Players may hold more than one non-FIFA nationality.

No.	Pos.	Nation	Player
1	GK	NOR	Kristoffer Bjørløw Solberg (from Ørn Horten)
2	DF	NOR	Isak Vik (on loan from Tromsø)
3	DF	NOR	Anders Molund (from Kvik Halden)
4	DF	NOR	Tarik Mrakovic (from (Bosnia and Herzegovina) Igman Konjic)
5	DF	NOR	Erik Midtgarden (from Eik Tønsberg)
6	DF	NOR	Jesper Svenungsen Skau (from Odd, previously on loan)
8	MF	NOR	Eivind Willumsen (from Kjelsås)
10	MF	NOR	Leandro Neto (on loan from Lillestrøm)
11	MF	NOR	Jonas Bruusgaard (from Strømmen)
14	FW	NOR	Oliver Midtgård (from Nordstrand)
15	DF	NOR	Fabian Kvam (from Fløya)
16	MF	NGR	Fredrick Godwin (from (Nigeria) Sporting Supreme)
17	MF	NOR	Karim Bata (from Frigg)
20	FW	SLE	Alie Conteh (from (Sierra Leone) Goderich, previously on loan)
28	FW	NOR	Ebrima Sawaneh (from Frigg)
30	DF	NOR	Fabian Holst-Larsen (from Strømsgodset, previously on loan)
31	DF	NOR	Brage Evensen (promoted from junior squad)
37	FW	NOR	Sander Bratvold (loan return from Notodden)
87	GK	NOR	Leander Øy (on loan from Sarpsborg 08)

Out: Note: Flags indicate national team as defined under FIFA eligibility rules; some limited exceptions apply. Players may hold more than one non-FIFA nationality.

No.	Pos.	Nation	Player
1	GK	NOR	Thomas Kinn (to Viking)
3	DF	NOR	Markus Welinder (to Moss)
5	DF	NOR	Sivert Øverby (to (Sweden) Kalmar)
6	DF	NOR	Joackim Olsen Solberg (retired)
7	MF	NOR	Martin Rønning Ovenstad (to Stoppen)
8	MF	NOR	Ole Amund Sveen (to Raufoss)
10	MF	NOR	Vegard Leikvoll Moberg (to Os)
13	GK	NOR	Andreas Hippe Fagereng (to Elverum)
14	FW	NOR	Niclas Schjøth Semmen (loan return to KFUM)
16	DF	NOR	Johannes Dahlby (to Pors)
19	MF	NOR	Erik Næsbak Brenden (released)
24	MF	NOR	Mats Pedersen (loan return to Bodø/Glimt)
25	MF	NOR	Andreas Heredia-Randen (loan return to Strømsgodset)
26	DF	SRB	Aleksandar Lukić (to (Slovakia) Sereď)
27	MF	NOR	Kristoffer Tokstad (released)
31	DF	NOR	Brage Evensen (to Pors)
45	MF	FRO	Meinhard Olsen (to (Denmark) Kolding)
–	GK	NOR	Sondre Svanes Strand (to Vard, previously on loan)
–	FW	NOR	Keerat Singh (to Notodden, previously on loan at Lysekloster)
–	GK	NOR	Erik Stavås Skistad (released)

=== Moss ===
In: Note: Flags indicate national team as defined under FIFA eligibility rules; some limited exceptions apply. Players may hold more than one non-FIFA nationality.

No.	Pos.	Nation	Player
4	DF	NOR	Kristoffer Lassen Harrison (from KFUM, previously on loan)
5	DF	NOR	Edvard Linnebo Race (from Jerv)
12	GK	NOR	Jarik Sundling (from Sarpsborg 08, previously on loan)
16	MF	NOR	Sondre Høydal (loan return from Florø)
19	FW	MKD	Artan Memedov (from Sandnes Ulf)
20	FW	NOR	Kristoffer Sørensen (from Ull/Kisa)
21	MF	NOR	Sigurd Grønli (to Bryne)
22	FW	NGR	Jerry Patrick Ogbole (from (Nigeria) Sporting Supreme)
24	DF	NOR	Markus Welinder (from Mjøndalen)
33	DF	NOR	Tobias Dahl (on loan from Rosenborg)
37	DF	NOR	Magnus Antonsen (on loan from Bodø/Glimt 2)

Out: Note: Flags indicate national team as defined under FIFA eligibility rules; some limited exceptions apply. Players may hold more than one non-FIFA nationality.

No.	Pos.	Nation	Player
2	DF	NOR	Marius Andresen (to Aalesund)
4	DF	SWE	Tim Björkström (loan return to Fredrikstad)
5	DF	NOR	Ilir Kukleci (to Haugesund)
8	MF	NOR	Vetle Hellestø (released)
9	FW	NOR	Sebastian Pedersen (to Sogndal)
19	FW	NOR	Eythor Björgolfsson (to (Sweden) Umeå, previously on loan at Start)
20	MF	TUR	Aksel Baran Potur (to HamKam)

=== Odd ===
In: Note: Flags indicate national team as defined under FIFA eligibility rules; some limited exceptions apply. Players may hold more than one non-FIFA nationality.

No.	Pos.	Nation	Player
2	DF	NOR	Jørgen Sjøl (from Lyn)
4	DF	NOR	Nikolas Walstad (from Haugesund)
12	GK	NOR	Sebastian Hansen (promoted from junior squad)
14	DF	NOR	Julian Lerato Gunnerød (from Eik Tønsberg)
19	FW	NGR	Abduljeleel Abdulateef (from (Nigeria) Bison, previously on loan)
20	FW	ISL	Hinrik Harðarson (from (Iceland) ÍA)
23	MF	NOR	Noah Kojo (from Pors)
27	MF	NGR	Mukhtar Mustapha Adamu (from (Nigeria) Sporting Lagos)
29	FW	NOR	Rafik Zekhnini (from Sarpsborg 08)

Out: Note: Flags indicate national team as defined under FIFA eligibility rules; some limited exceptions apply. Players may hold more than one non-FIFA nationality.

No.	Pos.	Nation	Player
2	DF	NOR	Espen Ruud (retired)
4	DF	SWE	Leon Hien (to (Sweden) Degerfors)
5	DF	FIN	Tony Miettinen (to (Sweden) Mjällby)
10	FW	NOR	Mikael Ingebrigtsen (to (Cyprus) Omonia)
14	DF	GAM	Sheriff Sinyan (to (Romania) CFR Cluj)
20	FW	GHA	Ishaq Abdulrazak (loan return to (Belgium) Anderlecht)
23	FW	NOR	Anders Hartveit Ryste (to Notodden, previously on loan)
26	MF	SWE	Alexander Fransson (to (Sweden) Norrköping)
29	FW	NOR	Bork Bang-Kittilsen (to (Sweden) Mjällby)
30	GK	NOR	Peder Klausen (to Egersund)
40	GK	NOR	Kjetil Haug (loan return to (France) Toulouse)
–	DF	NOR	Jesper Svenungsen Skau (to Mjøndalen, previously on loan)
–	MF	NOR	Thomas Rekdal (to Tromsdalen, previously on loan)

=== Ranheim ===
In: Note: Flags indicate national team as defined under FIFA eligibility rules; some limited exceptions apply. Players may hold more than one non-FIFA nationality.

No.	Pos.	Nation	Player
10	FW	FRO	Áki Debes Samuelsen (from (Faroe Islands) HB Tórshavn)
17	MF	NOR	Dennis Torp Helland (promoted from junior squad)
19	DF	NOR	Jonas Pereira (from Levanger)
23	DF	NOR	Elias Myrvågnes (from Tiller)
25	FW	NOR	Leander Skammelsrud (promoted from junior squad)

Out: Note: Flags indicate national team as defined under FIFA eligibility rules; some limited exceptions apply. Players may hold more than one non-FIFA nationality.

No.	Pos.	Nation	Player
5	DF	NOR	Sander Amble Haugen (to Lyn)
6	MF	NOR	Jakob Tromsdal (to Sandnes Ulf)
10	MF	NOR	John Hou Sæter (to (China) Yunnan Yukun)
11	FW	NOR	Sivert Solli (to Brattvåg)
18	DF	NOR	Brage Kvithyld (to (Faroe Islands) 07 Vestur, previously on loan at Stjørdals-Blink)
22	FW	NOR	Sigurd Prestmo (to Tromsø, previously on loan at Stjørdals-Blink)
92	GK	TTO	Nicklas Frenderup (retired)

=== Raufoss ===
In: Note: Flags indicate national team as defined under FIFA eligibility rules; some limited exceptions apply. Players may hold more than one non-FIFA nationality.

No.	Pos.	Nation	Player
1	GK	NOR	Anders Klemensson (from Kongsvinger)
2	MF	NOR	Torjus Engebakken (on loan from Fredrikstad)
3	DF	SWE	Rasmus Bonde (on loan from (Sweden) AIK)
13	DF	BDI	Vaillance Nihorimbere (from Gjøvik-Lyn)
16	MF	NOR	Ole Amund Sveen (from Mjøndalen)
19	FW	NOR	Elias Aarflot (on loan from Tromsø)
23	MF	NOR	Jonas Sørensen Selnæs (from Stjørdals-Blink)
24	MF	NOR	Markus Myre Aanesland (from Sandnes Ulf)
25	MF	NOR	Tinus Engebakken (promoted from junior squad)
29	MF	NOR	Elias Sørum (promoted from junior squad)
30	FW	NOR	Jonas Dalen Korsaksel (promoted from junior squad)

Out: Note: Flags indicate national team as defined under FIFA eligibility rules; some limited exceptions apply. Players may hold more than one non-FIFA nationality.

No.	Pos.	Nation	Player
1	GK	NOR	Ole Kristian Lauvli (to Tromsø)
3	DF	NOR	Adan Hussein (to Stjørdals-Blink)
6	MF	LAT	Eduards Emsis (to (Latvia) Super Nova)
7	FW	NOR	Andreas Østerud (to Arendal, previously on loan at Kvik Halden)
14	DF	GHA	Jamal Deen Haruna (loan return to Sogndal)
19	FW	NOR	Magnus Fagernes (to Levanger)
23	MF	NOR	El Schaddai Furaha (loan return to Lillestrøm)
26	MF	NOR	Adnan Hadzic (loan return to KFUM)
27	MF	NOR	Oskar Sangnes (on loan to Gjøvik-Lyn)
36	GK	NOR	Mathias Søgård Hasle (to Kolbu/KK, previously on loan)
77	DM	NOR	Marius Alm (to Skreia)

=== Skeid ===
In: Note: Flags indicate national team as defined under FIFA eligibility rules; some limited exceptions apply. Players may hold more than one non-FIFA nationality.

No.	Pos.	Nation	Player
5	DF	NOR	Keivan Ghaedamini (from Egersund)
9	FW	NOR	Filip Møller Delaveris (from Eidsvold Turn)
10	FW	NOR	Martin Hoel Andersen (from (Sweden) Öster)
15	MF	NOR	Adnan Hadzic (from KFUM)
16	FW	NOR	Kristoffer Ødemarksbakken (from (Faroe Islands) KI Klaksvik)
17	FW	NOR	Yasir Sa'Ad (on loan from KFUM)
23	DF	NOR	Akinsola Akinyemi (from KFUM)
26		NOR	Dino Sarotic (promoted from junior squad)

Out: Note: Flags indicate national team as defined under FIFA eligibility rules; some limited exceptions apply. Players may hold more than one non-FIFA nationality.

No.	Pos.	Nation	Player
5	DF	NOR	Thor Lange (retired)
9	FW	NOR	Kabamba Kalabatama (to (Moldova) Milsami Orhei)
10	MF	NOR	Ulrich Østigård Ness (to Gamle Oslo)
15	DF	NOR	Hayder Altai (to (Iraq) Diyala)
17	DF	NOR	Gustav Severinsen (to Fløya)
24	GK	NOR	Benjamin Jakobsen Hristov (to Nordstrand)
26	MF	NOR	Eduard Hjelde (to Bærum)
27	MF	NOR	Ivar Eftedal (to Follo)
29	FW	NOR	Muhammad Usman Shahid (to Nordstrand)
30	FW	NOR	Daniel Lunde (to Fram)
32	MF	NOR	Christopher Kjensteberg (loan return to Lillestrøm 2)

=== Sogndal ===
In: Note: Flags indicate national team as defined under FIFA eligibility rules; some limited exceptions apply. Players may hold more than one non-FIFA nationality.

No.	Pos.	Nation	Player
2	DF	POR	Diogo Brás (from (Portugal) União Santarém)
7	FW	NOR	Sebastian Pedersen (from Moss)
14	DF	GHA	Jamal Deen Haruna (loan return from Raufoss)
16	MF	LAT	Lūkass Vapne (on loan from (Latvia) Metta)
18	MF	NOR	Vegard Hagen (from Brann 2)
33	DF	NOR	Sander Aske Granheim (promoted from junior squad)
88	DF	KEN	Ronney Onyango Otieno (from (Kenya) Gor Mahia)

Out: Note: Flags indicate national team as defined under FIFA eligibility rules; some limited exceptions apply. Players may hold more than one non-FIFA nationality.

No.	Pos.	Nation	Player
2	DF	SWE	Felix Eriksson (loan return to (Sweden) IFK Göteborg)
3	DF	NOR	Jesper Robertsen (loan return to Tromsø)
4	DF	DEN	Daniel Arrocha (to Jerv)
5	DF	NOR	Kristoffer Forgaard Paulsen (loan return to Viking)
16	DF	NGR	Emmanuel Olugbe (loan return to (Nigeria) Hype Buzz)
19	FW	SEN	Yoro Ba (loan return to Tromsø)

=== Stabæk ===
In: Note: Flags indicate national team as defined under FIFA eligibility rules; some limited exceptions apply. Players may hold more than one non-FIFA nationality.

No.	Pos.	Nation	Player
14	DF	DEN	Mads Nielsen (from Fredrikstad)
21	MF	NOR	Kristian Lønstad Onsrud (from Hamkam)
27	MF	GHA	Emmanuel Danso (from Strømsgodset)
28	MF	NOR	Jesper Isaksen (to Kristiansund)

Out: Note: Flags indicate national team as defined under FIFA eligibility rules; some limited exceptions apply. Players may hold more than one non-FIFA nationality.

No.	Pos.	Nation	Player
3	DF	NOR	Jon Haukvik Øya (on loan to Hønefoss)
6	MF	DEN	Magnus Christensen (to (Sweden) Öster)
11	DF	NOR	Nikolas Walstad (loan return to Haugesund)
14	MF	USA	Thomas Roberts (released)
23	GK	NOR	Marius Ulla (to Hødd)
28	MF	NOR	Brage Tobiassen (on loan to Arendal)
31	FW	NOR	Richard Ferrington (demoted to junior squad)
–	MF	USA	Chris Hegardt (to (United States) Orange County, previously on loan)

=== Start ===
In: Note: Flags indicate national team as defined under FIFA eligibility rules; some limited exceptions apply. Players may hold more than one non-FIFA nationality.

No.	Pos.	Nation	Player
5	DF	TUN	Omar Jebali (from (Denmark) Vendsyssel)
6	DF	NOR	John Olav Norheim (from Hamkam)
10	MF	CMR	Stève Mvoué (free transfer)
18	MF	NOR	Mikael Ugland (from Jerv)
24	GK	NOR	Storm Strand-Kolbjørnsen (from Vålerenga)
25	FW	NGR	Terry Benjamin
27	FW	NGR	Gift Sunday (on loan from Bodø/Glimt 2)
29	FW	LBR	Emmanuel Gono (on loan from (Sweden) AIK)
31	FW	NOR	Jonas Seim (promoted from junior squad)
–	DF	NOR	Benjamin Sundo (from Fløy)

Out: Note: Flags indicate national team as defined under FIFA eligibility rules; some limited exceptions apply. Players may hold more than one non-FIFA nationality.

No.	Pos.	Nation	Player
1	GK	NOR	Jasper Silva Torkildsen (on loan to Haugesund)
5	DF	NOR	Nicolas Pignatel Jenssen (to Egersund)
6	MF	CGO	Kaya Makosso (loan return to (Spain) Vélez)
7	MF	NOR	Sigurd Grønli (loan return to Bryne)
9	FW	NOR	Kristoffer Hoven (to Hønefoss)
14	DF	FIN	Kalle Wallius (to (Finland) Ilves, previously on loan at (Finland) Mariehamn)
17	FW	NOR	Sander Richardsen (on loan to Fløy)
23	FW	NGR	Mustapha Isah (loan return to (Denmark) Randers)
24	DF	NOR	Jesper Gravdahl (to Fløy)
25	MF	KOS	Herolind Shala (to (Albania) Partizani)
27	DF	NOR	Ludvig Begby (loan return to Fredrikstad)
29	DF	AUT	Wilhelm Vorsager (to (Austria) Stripfing)
37	FW	NOR	Eythor Björgolfsson (loan return to Moss)
44	FW	SWE	Salim Nkubiri (to (Sweden) Vasalund)
–	FW	NOR	Sander Svela (to Vindbjart, previously on loan at Arendal)
–	DF	NOR	Benjamin Sundo (on loan to Arendal)

=== Åsane ===
In: Note: Flags indicate national team as defined under FIFA eligibility rules; some limited exceptions apply. Players may hold more than one non-FIFA nationality.

No.	Pos.	Nation	Player
4	DF	NOR	Eirik Lereng (from Arendal, previously on loan)
7	MF	NOR	Jesper Eikrem (on loan from Brann 2)
17	FW	SWE	Nobel Gebrezgi (from (Sweden) Hammarby TFF)
19	DF	NOR	Isak Vådebu (on loan from Tromsø)
24	GK	SWE	Sebastian Selin (from (Sweden) Hammarby TFF, previously on loan)
32	DF	NOR	Andreas Vindheim (free transfer)
45	MF	NOR	Sverre Spangelo Haga (from Os)

Out: Note: Flags indicate national team as defined under FIFA eligibility rules; some limited exceptions apply. Players may hold more than one non-FIFA nationality.

No.	Pos.	Nation	Player
2	DF	NOR	Martin Ueland (to Varegg)
17	DF	NOR	Magnus Bruun-Hanssen (to Sandviken)
19	MF	NOR	Kristoffer Larsen (to Vestsiden-Askøy)
21	FW	NOR	Jon Berisha (to Brann 2)
25	FW	NOR	Emmanuel Tchotcho Bangoura (on loan to Lysekloster, previously on loan at Sandviken)
27	MF	NOR	Thomas Roger Lotsberg (on loan to Sandviken, previously on loan at Arendal)
–	FW	NOR	Jacob Jacobsen Bolsø (to Lysekloster, previously on loan)
