= 2024 Fredrikstad FK season =

Fredrikstad
2024 season
- Chairman: Jostein Lunde
- Head coach: Mikkjal Thomassen
- Stadium: Fredrikstad Stadion
- Eliteserien: 6th
- Norwegian Cup: Winners
- Top goalscorer: League: Morten Bjørlo (10); All: Morten Bjørlo (13)
Home colours	Away colours	Third colours

The 2024 season was Fredrikstad FK's 120th season in existence and the club's first season back in the top flight of Norwegian football since 2012. In addition to the domestic league, Fredrikstad FK participatedin this season's edition of the Norwegian Football Cup. The club defeated Molde in the final of the Norwegian Cup, winning the trophy for a joint-record 12th time.

== Players ==
=== First team squad ===
As of 2 September 2024

Note: Flags indicate national team as defined under FIFA eligibility rules; some limited exceptions apply. Players may hold more than one non-FIFA nationality.

No.	Pos.	Nation	Player
1	GK	NOR	Håvar Jenssen
3	DF	NOR	Brage Skaret
4	DF	NOR	Stian Stray Molde
5	DF	NOR	Simen Rafn (captain)
6	DF	NOR	Philip Aukland
7	MF	FRO	Brandur Hendriksson
9	FW	NOR	Henrik Kjelsrud Johansen
10	MF	NOR	Morten Bjørlo
11	FW	GUI	Maï Traoré
12	MF	CAN	Patrick Metcalfe
13	MF	NOR	Sondre Sørløkk
14	FW	FRO	Jóannes Bjartalíð
15	DF	SEN	Fallou Fall (on loan from Reims)
16	DF	NOR	Daniel Eid

No.	Pos.	Nation	Player
17	DF	NOR	Sigurd Kvile
19	MF	ISL	Júlíus Magnússon
20	MF	DEN	Jeppe Kjær (on loan from Bodø/Glimt)
22	DF	GHA	Maxwell Woledzi
23	FW	NOR	Henrik Skogvold
24	DF	NOR	Torjus Engebakken
25	GK	NOR	Ole Langbråten
28	DF	NOR	Imre Bech Hermansen
29	FW	NOR	Oscar Aga (on loan from Rosenborg)
30	GK	DEN	Jonathan Fischer
31	MF	NOR	Elias Solberg
32	DF	NOR	Jesper Solberg
44	MF	NGR	Samson Tijani (on loan from Red Bull Salzburg)

=== Out on loan ===
Note: Flags indicate national team as defined under FIFA eligibility rules; some limited exceptions apply. Players may hold more than one non-FIFA nationality.

No.	Pos.	Nation	Player
2	DF	SWE	Tim Björkström (at Moss) until 31 December 2024
18	DF	NOR	Ludvig Begby (at IK Start) until 31 December 2024

No.	Pos.	Nation	Player
26	DF	DEN	Mads Nielsen (at Aalesund) until 31 December 2024
—	FW	SWE	Lucas Lima (at Utsikten) until 31 December 2024

== Transfers ==
=== Winter ===
In: Note: Flags indicate national team as defined under FIFA eligibility rules; some limited exceptions apply. Players may hold more than one non-FIFA nationality.

No.	Pos.	Nation	Player
10	MF	NOR	Morten Bjørlo (from Rosenborg)
11	FW	GUI	Maï Traoré (from Viking)
17	DF	NOR	Sigurd Kvile (from Bodø/Glimt, previously on loan)
20	FW	DEN	Jeppe Kjær (on loan from Bodø/Glimt)
21	DF	NOR	Oscar Kjøge Jansson (loan return from Raufoss)
23	MF	NOR	Erlend Segberg (from Aalesund)
30	GK	DEN	Jonathan Fischer (from (Denmark) Hobro)
33	MF	NOR	Filip Stensland (loan return from Kvik Halden)

Out: Note: Flags indicate national team as defined under FIFA eligibility rules; some limited exceptions apply. Players may hold more than one non-FIFA nationality.

No.	Pos.	Nation	Player
10	FW	SWE	Lucas Lima (on loan to (Sweden) Utsikten, previously on loan at (Sweden) Helsingborg)
11	FW	DOM	Riki Alba (to (United States) Las Vegas Lights)
16	MF	MLI	Aboubacar Konté (to (Georgia (country)) Dila Gori)
17	DF	NOR	Tage Johansen (to Hødd, previously on loan at Skeid)
20	MF	NOR	Håvard Huser Åsheim (released)
23	MF	NOR	Mikail Maden (to (Denmark) Esbjerg)
24	FW	SWE	Noa Williams (to Kongsvinger, previously on loan at Skeid)
27	DF	DEN	Mikkel Lassen (loan return to (Denmark) Horsens)

=== Summer ===
In: Note: Flags indicate national team as defined under FIFA eligibility rules; some limited exceptions apply. Players may hold more than one non-FIFA nationality.

No.	Pos.	Nation	Player
1	GK	NOR	Håvar Jenssen (loan return from Tromsø)
15	DF	SEN	Fallou Fall (on loan from (France) Reims)
16	DF	NOR	Daniel Eid (from (Sweden) Norrköping)
23	FW	NOR	Henrik Skogvold (from Lillestrøm)
24	DF	NOR	Torjus Engebakken (from Raufoss)
28	DF	NOR	Imre Bech Hermansen (loan return from Bryne)
31	MF	NOR	Elias Solberg (promoted from junior squad)
32	DF	NOR	Jesper Solberg (promoted from junior squad)
44	MF	NGR	Samson Tijani (on loan from (Austria) Red Bull Salzburg)

Out: Note: Flags indicate national team as defined under FIFA eligibility rules; some limited exceptions apply. Players may hold more than one non-FIFA nationality.

No.	Pos.	Nation	Player
1	GK	NOR	Håvar Jenssen (on loan to Tromsø)
2	DF	SWE	Tim Björkström (on loan to Moss)
18	DF	NOR	Ludvig Begby (on loan to Start)
21	DF	NOR	Oscar Kjøge Jansson (to Strømmen)
23	MF	NOR	Erlend Segberg (to Kristiansund)
26	DF	DEN	Mads Nielsen (on loan to Aalesund)
33	MF	NOR	Filip Stensland (to Skeid)

== Competitions ==
=== Overview ===
Competition	First match	Last match	Starting round	Final position	Record							
Competition	First match	Last match	Starting round	Final position	Pld	W	D	L	GF	GA	GD	Win %
Eliteserien	1 April 2024	1 December 2024	Matchday 1	6th	30	14	9	7	39	35	+4	46.67
Norwegian Cup	10 April 2024	7 December 2024	First round	Winners	7	5	2	0	20	4	+16	71.43
Total					37	19	11	7	59	39	+20	51.35

Last updated: 7 December 2024
Source: Soccerway

=== Eliteserien ===
==== League table ====
Pos	Team	Pld	W	D	L	GF	GA	GD	Pts	Qualification or relegation
4	Rosenborg	30	16	5	9	52	39	+13	53	Qualification for the Conference League second qualifying round
5	Molde	30	15	7	8	64	36	+28	52	
6	Fredrikstad	30	14	9	7	39	35	+4	51	Qualification for the Europa League third qualifying round (Note: Fredrikstad qualified for the Europa League third qualifying round by winning the 2024 Norwegian Football Cup.)
7	Strømsgodset	30	10	8	12	32	40	−8	38	
8	KFUM	30	9	10	11	35	36	−1	37	

Source: Football Association of Norway (in Norwegian)
Rules for classification: 1) Points; 2) Goal difference; 3) Goals scored; 4) Head-to-head points; 5) Head-to-head goal difference; 6) Head-to-head goals scored.

==== Results summary ====
Overall								Home						Away					
Pld	W	D	L	GF	GA	GD	Pts	W	D	L	GF	GA	GD	W	D	L	GF	GA	GD
30	14	9	7	39	35	+4	51	7	6	2	19	15	+4	7	3	5	20	20	0

Last updated: 1 December 2024.

==== Results by round ====
Round	1	2	3	4	5	6	7	8	9	10	11	12	13	14	15	16	17	18	19	20	21	22	23	24	25	26	27	28	29	30
Ground	H	A	H	A	H	A	A	H	A	H	A	H	A	H	A	H	H	A	H	A	H	A	H	A	H	A	H	A	H	A
Result	L	W	D	D	W	W	W	W	W	D	D	W	L	D	W	D	D	L	L	L	W	L	W	W	W	L	D	D	W	W
Position	14	7	7	9	6	4	4	3	2	2	2	2	3	4	2	3	3	5	5	5	5	6	6	6	5	6	6	6	6	6

A = Away; H = Home; W = Win; D = Draw; L = Loss

==== Matches ====
The league fixtures were announced on 20 December 2023.

1 April 2024 1	Fredrikstad	0–2	Bodø/Glimt	Fredrikstad
14:30 CEST (UTC+2)	Aukland (yellow card) 27'; Molde (yellow card) 37'; Thomassen (yellow card) 40'	Report	Bjørkan 47'; Mikkelsen 70'; Gundersen (yellow card) 71'	Stadium: Fredrikstad Stadion; Attendance: 10,691; Referee: Rohit Saggi

7 April 2024 2	Brann	0–2	Fredrikstad	Bergen
19:15 CEST (UTC+2)		Report	Aukland (yellow card) 32'; Traoré (yellow card) 35'; Molde 42', 72'; Magnússon (yellow card) 68'	Stadium: Brann Stadion; Attendance: 16,287; Referee: Ola Hobber Nilsen

13 April 2024 3	Fredrikstad	2–2	Sarpsborg 08	Fredrikstad
18:00 CEST (UTC+2)	Kvile 50' (yellow card) 72'; Nielsen (yellow card) 78'; Johansen 90+2'	Report	Berget 6'; Tebo 74'; J. Andersen (yellow card) 78'; Zekhnini (yellow card) 90+1'	Stadium: Fredrikstad Stadion; Attendance: 12,504; Referee: Sigurd Smehus Kringstad

21 April 2024 4	Viking	1–1	Fredrikstad	Stavanger
17:00 CEST (UTC+2)	D'Agostino 33'	Report	Bjørlo 8' (yellow card) 43'; Metcalfe (yellow card) 18'; Woledzi (yellow card) 33'; Hendriksson (yellow card) 52'; Molde (yellow card) 90+2'	Stadium: SR-Bank Arena; Attendance: 15,009; Referee: Marius Hansen Grøtta

28 April 2024 5	Fredrikstad	1–0	Sandefjord	Fredrikstad
17:00 CEST (UTC+2)	Bjørlo 30'; Kvile (yellow card) 57'	Report	Amin (yellow card) 36'	Stadium: Fredrikstad Stadion; Attendance: 6,669; Referee: Espen Eskås

5 May 2024 6	Odd	0–2	Fredrikstad	Skien
17:00 CEST (UTC+2)		Report	Aukland (yellow card) 74'; Bjørlo 79'; Sørløkk 90+3'	Stadium: Skagerak Arena; Attendance: 5,154; Referee: Svein Tore Sinnes

12 May 2024 7	KFUM Oslo	1–4	Fredrikstad	Oslo
17:00 CEST (UTC+2)	Svindland 60' (pen.); Aleesami (yellow card) 62'	Report	Bjørlo 3', 7'; Kjær 33', 45'	Stadium: KFUM Arena; Attendance: 3,206; Referee: Christian Moen

16 May 2024 8	Fredrikstad	4–1	Strømsgodset	Fredrikstad
18:00 CEST (UTC+2)	Molde 4'; E. U. Andersen 14' (o.g.); Bjørlo 41' (pen.); Aga 66'; Fischer (yellow card) 81'	Report	Aukland 8' (o.g.); Krasniqi (yellow card) 64'	Stadium: Fredrikstad Stadion; Attendance: 11,317; Referee: Daniel Higraff

20 May 2024 9	Lillestrøm	0–3	Fredrikstad	Lillestrøm
17:00 CEST (UTC+2)	Røssing (yellow card) 84'; Ibrahimaj (yellow card) 90+1'	Report	Aukland (yellow card) 33'; Magnússon 41'; Aga 90' (pen.) (yellow card) 90'; Sørløkk 90+2'	Stadium: Åråsen Stadion; Attendance: 9,267; Referee: Ola Hobber Nilsen

25 May 2024 10	Fredrikstad	0–0	Tromsø	Fredrikstad
18:00 CEST (UTC+2)	Molde (red card) 19'	Report	Barry (yellow card) 25'; Yttergård Jenssen (yellow card) 45'	Stadium: Fredrikstad Stadion; Attendance: 8,671; Referee: Rohit Saggi

29 May 2024 18	Tromsø	3–0	Fredrikstad	Tromsø
19:00 CEST (UTC+2)	Nordås 17', 80' (pen.); Romsaas 34'	Report	Woledzi (yellow card) 78'	Stadium: Romssa Arena; Attendance: 4,501; Referee: Tore Hansen

2 June 2024 11	Rosenborg	1–1	Fredrikstad	Trondheim
19:15 CEST (UTC+2)	Pereira (yellow card) 37'; Väänänen 53'	Report	Johansen 90+5'	Stadium: Lerkendal Stadion; Attendance: 11,922; Referee: Marius Hansen Grøtta

8 July 2024 13	Kristiansund	3–1	Fredrikstad	Fredrikstad
19:00 CEST (UTC+2)	Alte 14'; Rakneberg (yellow card) 32'; Sivertsen 45+4' (pen.); Traoré 59' (o.g.)	Report	Bjørlo 9' (pen.), (red card) 19'; Woledzi (yellow card) 58'; Kvile (yellow card) 78'	Stadium: Fredrikstad Stadion; Attendance: 3,621; Referee: Marius Lien

13 July 2024 14	Fredrikstad	0–0	Molde	Fredrikstad
17:00 CEST (UTC+2)	Traoré (yellow card) 49'	Report	Eriksen (yellow card) 81'; Haugan (yellow card) 84'	Stadium: Fredrikstad Stadion; Attendance: 9,115; Referee: Kristoffer Hagenes

21 July 2024 15	HamKam	0–1	Fredrikstad	Hamar
17:00 CEST (UTC+2)	Sørås (yellow card) 50'	Report	Molde 63'	Stadium: Briskeby Stadion; Attendance: 4,486; Referee: Daniel Higraff

27 July 2024 16	Fredrikstad	2–2	Rosenborg	Fredrikstad
18:00 CEST (UTC+2)	Bjørlo 15'; Skaret (yellow card) 34'; Traoré 37'; Molde (yellow card) 77'; Woledzi (yellow card) 77'	Report	Reitan-Sunde 3'; Sæter 69'; Reitan (yellow card) 78'	Stadium: Fredrikstad Stadion; Attendance: 10,630; Referee: Tore Hansen

4 August 2024 17	Fredrikstad	0–0	KFUM Oslo	Fredrikstad
17:00 CEST (UTC+2)		Report	Rasch (yellow card) 69'	Stadium: Fredrikstad Stadion; Attendance: 7,616; Referee: Mathias Støfringshaug

14 August 2024 12	Fredrikstad	1–0	Haugesund	Fredrikstad
19:00 CEST (UTC+2)	Traoré 90+2'	Report		Stadium: Fredrikstad Stadion; Attendance: 6,369; Referee: Sivert Øksnes Amland

18 August 2024 19	Fredrikstad	0–4	Brann	Fredrikstad
14:30 CEST (UTC+2)	Kvile (yellow card) 49'; Aukland (yellow card) 85'; Woledzi (yellow card) 90+4'	Report	Heggebø (yellow card) 43'; Kartum 44'; Sande 69'; Mathisen 80'; Finne 83'	Stadium: Fredrikstad Stadion; Attendance: 9,147; Referee: Rohit Saggi

25 August 2024 20	Haugesund	1–0	Fredrikstad	Haugesund
17:00 CEST (UTC+2)	Nyhammer 85'	Report		Stadium: Haugesund Stadion; Attendance: 5,550; Referee: Tore Hansen

31 August 2024 21	Fredrikstad	2–0	Odd	Fredrikstad
18:00 CEST (UTC+2)	Bjørlo 59' (pen.); Eid (yellow card) 82'; Johansen 82'	Report	Aas (yellow card) 32'	Stadium: Fredrikstad Stadion; Attendance: 5,976; Referee: Marius Hansen Grøtta

14 September 2024 22	Molde	6–1	Fredrikstad	Molde
18:00 CEST (UTC+2)	Haugen 15'; Bjørnbak 28'; Haugan 32'; Kaasa 52'; Brynhildsen 57'; Linnes 61'	Report	Rafn 1'; Fall (yellow card) 13'	Stadium: Aker Stadion; Attendance: 6,372; Referee: Sivert Øksnes Amland

22 September 2024 23	Fredrikstad	3–2	Viking	Fredrikstad
19:15 CEST (UTC+2)	Fall 14'; Molde 42'; Sørløkk 55'; Tijani (yellow card) 89'; Bjørlo (yellow card) 90+4'	Report	Haugen (yellow card) 28'; Salvesen (yellow card) 74' (goal) 84'; Kvia-Egeskog 79'	Stadium: Fredrikstad Stadion; Attendance: 6,171; Referee: Ola Hobber Nilsen

28 September 2024 24	Sarpsborg 08	0–1	Fredrikstad	Sarpsborg
20:00 CEST (UTC+2)	Reinhardsen (yellow card) 44'; Ørjasæter (yellow card) 54'; Koch (yellow card) 90+6'	Report	Skogvold 48'; Eid (yellow card) 80'; Rafn (yellow card) 83'	Stadium: Sarpsborg Stadion; Attendance: 8,022; Referee: Rohit Saggi

20 October 2024 25	Fredrikstad	2–1	Lillestrøm	Fredrikstad
19:15 CEST (UTC+2)	Sørløkk (yellow card) 22'; Rafn (yellow card) 43'; Bjørlo 51' (pen.); Kvile (yellow card) 56'; Kjær 78' (yellow card) 78'	Report	Gabrielsen (yellow card) 45+2' (goal) 59'; Jeahze (yellow card) 87'; Knudtzon (yellow card) 90+1'	Stadium: Fredrikstad Stadion; Attendance: 10,906; Referee: Sivert Øksnes Amland

26 October 2024 26	Strømsgodset	2–0	Fredrikstad	Drammen
18:00 CEST (UTC+2)	Therkelsen 12'; Tómasson 55' (yellow card) 60'; Sørmo (yellow card) 77'; Bråtveit (yellow card) 88'	Report		Stadium: Marienlyst Stadion; Attendance: 4,604; Referee: Daniel Higraff

3 November 2024 27	Fredrikstad	1–1	Kristiansund	Fredrikstad
17:00 CET (UTC+1)	Fall 45'	Report	Sivertsen 54' (pen.) (yellow card) 54'	Stadium: Fredrikstad Stadion; Attendance: 5,990; Referee: Mathias Støfringshaug

10 November 2024 28	Bodø/Glimt	2–2	Fredrikstad	Bodø
19:15 CET (UTC+1)	Gundersen (yellow card) 57' (yellow-red card) 67'; Berg 75'; Helmersen 79'; Saltnes (yellow card) 83'	Report	Molde 40'; Metcalfe (yellow card) 50'; Sørløkk (yellow card) 65'; Bjørlo (yellow card) 71'; Skogvold 89'; Johansen (yellow card) 90+3'	Stadium: Aspmyra Stadion; Attendance: 5,872; Referee: Rohit Saggi

23 November 2024 29	Fredrikstad	1–0	HamKam	Fredrikstad
17:00 CET (UTC+1)	Magnússon (yellow card) 64'; Johansen 79'	Report	Michelsen (yellow card) 51'; Simenstad (yellow card) 64'; Norheim (yellow card) 90+3'	Stadium: Fredrikstad Stadion; Attendance: 5,578; Referee: Mohammad Usman Aslam

1 December 2024 30	Sandefjord	0–1	Fredrikstad	Sandefjord
17:00 CET (UTC+1)		Report	Magnússon 64'; Hagen (yellow card) 67'; Fischer (yellow card) 84'	Stadium: Jotun Arena; Attendance: 3,616; Referee: Svein Tore Sinnes

=== Norwegian Football Cup ===
10 April 2024 First round	Drøbak-Frogn	0–10	Fredrikstad	Drøbak
18:00 CEST (UTC+2)		Report	Johansen 18'; Begby 30'; Hendriksson 42' (pen.); Segberg 43'; Kjær 59'; Bjørlo 63', 90+1'; Aga 65'; Solberg 71'; Skaret 83'	Stadium: Seiersten stadion Referee: Arion Shaqiri

25 April 2024 Second round	Eik Tønsberg	2–5	Fredrikstad	Tønsberg
18:00 CEST (UTC+2)	Danielsen 27'; Andersen (yellow card) 33'; Myrbakk 52'; Gunnerød (yellow card) 57'; Midtgarden (yellow card) 82'	Report	Danielsen 22' (o.g.); Metcalfe 41'; Hendriksson 58'; Magnússon 78'; Kjær 85'	Stadium: Tønsberg Gressbane; Attendance: 2,830; Referee: Magnus Nicolai Koløy

1 May 2024 Third round	Fredrikstad	1–0	Rosenborg	Fredrikstad
14:30 CEST (UTC+2)	Aukland (yellow card) 29'; Bjørlo (yellow card) 72'; Woledzi (yellow card) 77'; Aga 90+1'	Report	Cornic (yellow card) 45'; Nelson (yellow card) 55'	Stadium: Fredrikstad Stadion; Attendance: 6,073; Referee: Kristoffer Hagenes

8 May 2024 Fourth round	Raufoss	2–3	Fredrikstad	Raufoss
18:00 CEST (UTC+2)	Engebakken 13'; Nordbø 28'; Emsis (yellow card) 85'; Wålemark (yellow card) 87'; Fagernes (yellow card) 90+1'	Report	Johansen 11'; Sørløkk 24'; Hendriksson 49' (penalty missed) 86'	Stadium: Nammo Stadion; Attendance: 1,142; Referee: Ola Hobber Nilsen

6 October 2024 Quarter-finals	Vålerenga	0–1 (a.e.t.)	Fredrikstad	Oslo
18:00 CEST (UTC+2)	Kiil Olsen (yellow card) 42'; Ambina (yellow card) 96'	Report	Woledzi (yellow card) 25'; Bjørlo 97'; Kjær (yellow card) 118'	Stadium: Intility Arena; Attendance: 13,276; Referee: Sigurd Smehus Kringstad

30 October 2024 Semi-finals	Fredrikstad	0–0 (a.e.t.) (6–5 p)	KFUM Oslo	Fredrikstad
20:30 CET (UTC+1)	Fall (yellow card) 45+3'; Bjartalíð (yellow card) 48'	Report		Stadium: Fredrikstad Stadion; Attendance: 10,564; Referee: Kristoffer Hagenes
	Penalties
	Bjørlo (penalty scored); Kjelsrud Johansen (penalty missed); Bjartalíð (penalty scored); Hendriksson (penalty scored); Rafn (penalty scored); Magnússon (penalty scored); Kjær (penalty scored)		(penalty missed) Ndiaye; (penalty scored) Hestnes; (penalty scored) Aleesami; (penalty scored) Sandal; (penalty scored) Nuñez; (penalty scored) Okeke; (penalty missed) Akinyemi

7 December 2024 Final	Fredrikstad	0–0 (a.e.t.) (5–4 p)	Molde	Oslo
16:00 CET (UTC+1)	Sørløkk (yellow card) 74'; Skogvold (yellow card) 89'	Report	Linnes (yellow card) 56'; Breivik (yellow card) 62'; Eriksen (yellow card) 103'	Stadium: Ullevaal Stadion; Attendance: 23,058; Referee: Sigurd Smehus Kringstad
	Penalties
	Bjørlo (penalty scored); Bjartalíð (penalty scored); Hendriksson (penalty scored); Skogvold (penalty scored); Magnússon (penalty scored)		(penalty missed) Haugan; (penalty scored) Stenevik; (penalty scored) Gulbrandsen; (penalty scored) Eikrem; (penalty scored) Løvik
