= 2024 Norwegian Football Cup final =

- Event: 2024 Norwegian Football Cup
Fredrikstad	Molde
0	0
- Fredrikstad won 5–4 on penalties
- Date: 7 December 2024
- Venue: Ullevaal Stadion, Oslo
- Referee: Sigurd Smehus Kringstad
- Attendance: 23,058

The 2024 Norwegian Football Cup final was the final match of the 2024 Norwegian Football Cup, the 118th season of the Norwegian Football Cup, the premier Norwegian football cup competition organized by the Football Association of Norway (NFF). The match played on 7 December 2024 at the Ullevaal Stadion in Oslo, and opposed two Eliteserien sides Fredrikstad and Molde.

== Route to the final ==
Note: In all results below, the score of the finalist is given first.

Fredrikstad		Round	Molde	
Drøbak-Frogn (D4); A 10–0	Johansen 18', Begby 30', Hendriksson 42' (pen.), Segberg 43', Kjær 59', Bjørlo 63', 90+1', Aga 65', Solberg 71', Skaret 83'	First round	Eide/Omegn (D4); A 5–0	Samuel 61', Nyheim 65', Granaas 75', Juberg-Hovland 87', Breivik 90+1'
Eik Tønsberg (D2); A 5–2	Danielsen 22' (o.g.), Metcalfe 41', Hendriksson 58', Magnússon 78', Kjær 85'	Second round	Strindheim (D2); A 2–1	Samuel 38', 53'
Rosenborg (ES); H 1–0	Aga 90+1'	Third round	Hødd (D2); A 3–1	Samuel 25', Granaas 62', Breivik 69'
Raufoss (D1); A 3–2	Johansen 11', Sørløkk 24', Hendriksson 49'	Fourth round	Sarpsborg 08 (ES); H 4–2	Eriksen 48', Hagelskjær 74', Eikrem 78', Hestad 82'
Vålerenga (D1); A 1–0 (a.e.t.)	Bjørlo 97'	Quarter-final	Lillestrøm (ES); A 2–1	Brynhildsen 29', Ihler 88'
KFUM Oslo (ES); A 0–0 (a.e.t.)(6–5 p)		Semi-final	Sandnes Ulf (D1); A 2–0	Eriksen 40', Haugen 78'

Key:

- ES = Eliteserien team
- D1 = 1. divisjon team
- D2 = 2. divisjon team
- D3 = 3. divisjon team
- D4 = 4. divisjon team
- H = Home
- A = Away

== Match ==
=== Details ===
7 December 2024
16:00 CET (UTC+1)

Fredrikstad	0–0 (a.e.t.)	Molde
	Report
Penalties
Bjørlo (penalty scored); Bjartalíð (penalty scored); Hendriksson (penalty scored); Skogvold (penalty scored); Magnússon (penalty scored)	5–4	(penalty missed) Haugan; (penalty scored) Stenevik; (penalty scored) Gulbrandsen; (penalty scored) Eikrem; (penalty scored) Løvik

Ullevaal Stadion, Oslo
Attendance: 23,058
Referee: Sigurd Smehus Kringstad (Valder)

Fredrikstad	Molde

Fredrikstad:
GK	30	(Denmark) Jonathan Fischer
RB	22	(Ghana) Maxwell Woledzi
CB	15	(Senegal) Fallou Fall
LB	17	(Norway) Sigurd Kvile
RM	5	(Norway) Simen Rafn		(substituted off) 104'
CM	10	(Norway) Morten Bjørlo
CM	12	(Canada) Patrick Metcalfe		(substituted off) 104'
CM	19	(Iceland) Júlíus Magnússon (c)
LM	4	(Norway) Stian Stray Molde
CF	14	(Faroe Islands) Jóannes Bjartalíð
CF	13	(Norway) Sondre Sørløkk	(yellow card) 74'	(substituted off) 80'
Substitutions:
GK	1	(Norway) Håvar Jenssen
DF	3	(Norway) Brage Skaret
DF	6	(Norway) Philip Aukland
MF	7	(Faroe Islands) Brandur Hendriksson		(substituted on) 104'
FW	9	(Norway) Henrik Kjelsrud Johansen
FW	11	(Guinea) Maï Traoré
DF	16	(Norway) Daniel Eid		(substituted on) 104'
MF	20	(Denmark) Jeppe Kjær
FW	23	(Norway) Henrik Skogvold	(substituted on) 80'	(yellow card) 89'
Head Coach:
(Norway) Andreas Hagen

Molde:
GK	22	(Poland) Albert Posiadała
RB	4	(Denmark) Valdemar Lund
CB	26	(Norway) Isak Amundsen
LB	2	(Norway) Martin Bjørnbak		(substituted off) 114'
DM	17	(Norway) Mats Møller Dæhli		(substituted off) 90+4'
RM	21	(Norway) Martin Linnes (c)	(yellow card) 56'	(substituted off) 68'
CM	20	(Norway) Kristian Eriksen	(yellow card) 103'
CM	16	(Norway) Emil Breivik	(yellow card) 62'
LM	28	(Norway) Kristoffer Haugen		(substituted off) 91'
CF	10	(Denmark) Mads Enggård		(substituted off) 68'
CF	27	(Norway) Ola Brynhildsen		(substituted off) 91'
Substitutions:
GK	34	(Republic of Ireland) Sean McDermott
MF	7	(Norway) Magnus Wolff Eikrem		(substituted on) 68'
FW	8	(Norway) Fredrik Gulbrandsen		(substituted on) 91'
FW	9	(Denmark) Frederik Ihler
MF	15	(Norway) Markus Kaasa		(substituted on) 68'
MF	18	(Norway) Halldor Østervold Stenevik		(substituted on) 68'
DF	19	(Norway) Eirik Haugan		(substituted on) 114'
MF	23	(Norway) Sondre Granaas
DF	31	(Norway) Mathias Løvik		(substituted on) 91'
Head Coach:
(Norway) Erling Moe

MATCH OFFICIALS

- Assistant referees:
  - Monica Løkkeberg (SK Freidig)
  - Alf Olav Rossland (Åkra IL)
- Fourth official: Mohammad Usman Aslam (Lier IL)
- Video assistant referee: Daniel Higraff (Forus og Gausel IL)
- Assistant video assistant referee: Steinar Hauge (IL Bjarg)

MATCH RULES

- 90 minutes.
- 30 minutes of extra-time if necessary.
- Penalty shoot-out if scores still level.
- Nine named substitutes.
- Maximum of five substitutions.
