= 2021 Norwegian First Division =

Association football season in Norway

Norwegian First Division
- Season: 2021
- Dates: 15 May – 27 November
- Champions: HamKam
- Promoted: HamKam; Aalesund; Jerv
- Relegated: Ull/Kisa; Strømmen
- Matches: 240
- Goals: 765 (3.19 per match)
- Top goalscorer: Oscar Aga (24 goals)
- Biggest home win: 6–2 (1 match); 5–1 (4 matches); 4–0 (3 matches)
- Biggest away win: Åsane 1–6 Aalesund (18 September 2021)
- Highest scoring: Sandnes Ulf 5–4 Ranheim (15 September 2021)
- Longest winning run: 5 matches Aalesund; HamKam; Jerv
- Longest unbeaten run: 23 matches Aalesund
- Longest winless run: 17 matches Strømmen
- Longest losing run: 7 matches Ull/Kisa
- All statistics correct as of 27 November 2021.

The 2021 Norwegian First Division (referred to as OBOS-ligaen for sponsorship reasons) is a Norwegian second-tier football league season.

The league started on 15 May 2021, and ended on 27 November 2021.

HamKam earned promotion to Eliteserien on 6 November 2021, after a 1–0 win against Stjørdals-Blink. Aalesund secured their promotion in the penultimate round.

== Teams ==
Locations of the teams in the 2021 1. divisjon

In the 2020 1. divisjon, Tromsø and Lillestrøm were promoted to the 2021 Eliteserien, while Kongsvinger and Øygarden were relegated to the 2021 2. divisjon.

Start and Aalesund were relegated from the 2020 Eliteserien, while Fredrikstad and Bryne were promoted from the 2020 2. divisjon.

=== Stadiums and locations ===
| Team | Location | Arena | Capacity | Manager |
|---|---|---|---|---|
| Aalesund | Ålesund | Color Line Stadion | 10,778 | (Norway) Lars Arne Nilsen |
| Bryne | Bryne | Bryne Stadion | 4,000 | (Norway) Jan Halvor Halvorsen |
| Fredrikstad | Fredrikstad | Fredrikstad Stadion | 12,500 | (Norway) Bjørn Johansen |
| Grorud | Oslo | Grorud Arctic Match | 1,700 | (Norway) Johan Gjønnes Nilsen |
| HamKam | Hamar | Briskeby Arena | 7,800 | (Norway) Kjetil Rekdal |
| Jerv | Grimstad | Levermyr Stadion | 3,300 | (Norway) Arne Sandstø |
| KFUM Oslo | Oslo | KFUM Arena | 2,000 | (Norway) Jørgen Isnes |
| Ranheim | Trondheim | Extra Arena | 3,000 | (Portugal) Hugo Pereira |
| Raufoss | Raufoss | Nammo Stadion | 1,800 | (Norway) Christian Johnsen |
| Sandnes Ulf | Sandnes | Øster Hus Arena | 6,043 | (Norway) Bjarne Berntsen |
| Sogndal | Sogndalsfjøra | Fosshaugane Campus | 5,622 | (Norway) Eirik Bakke |
| Start | Kristiansand | Sør Arena | 14,448 | (Norway) Sindre Tjelmeland |
| Stjørdals-Blink | Stjørdalshalsen | M.U.S Stadion | 2,000 | (England) Tom Dent |
| Strømmen | Strømmen | Strømmen Stadion | 2,000 | (Norway) Ole Martin Nesselquist |
| Ull/Kisa | Jessheim | Jessheim Stadion | 4,500 | (Norway) Steffen Landro |
| Åsane | Bergen | Åsane Arena | 3,300 | (Norway) Morten Røssland |

=== Managerial changes ===
| Team | Outgoing manager | Manner of departure | Date of vacancy | Table | Incoming manager | Date of appointment | Table |
|---|---|---|---|---|---|---|---|
| Stjørdals-Blink | (Norway) Roar Vikvang | Appointed head of Rosenborg's academy | 31 December 2020 | Pre-season | (England) Tom Dent | 1 January 2021 | Pre-season |
| Ull/Kisa | (Norway) Trond Fredriksen | Mutual consent | 11 January 2021 | Pre-season | (Norway) Sindre Tjelmeland | 12 January 2021 | Pre-season |
| Grorud | (Norway) Eirik Kjønø | Signed by Stabæk as assistant | 4 February 2021 | Pre-season | (Norway) Aksel Bergo | 1 March 2021 | Pre-season |
| Start | (Iceland) Jóhannes Harðarson | Sacked | 14 June 2021 | 7th | (Norway) Sindre Tjelmeland | 19 June 2021 | 12th |
| Ull/Kisa | (Norway) Sindre Tjelmeland | Signed by Start | 19 June 2021 | 11th | (Norway) Arild Sundgot | 1 July 2021 | 11th |
| Ranheim | (Norway) Svein Maalen | Mutual consent | 22 June 2021 | 15th | (Portugal) Hugo Pereira | 7 July 2021 | 15th |
| Sandnes Ulf | (Norway) Steffen Landro | Mutual consent | 14 July 2021 | 16th | (Norway) Bjarne Berntsen | 12 August 2021 | 14th |
| Grorud | (Norway) Aksel Bergo | Mutual consent | 27 August 2021 | 16th | (Norway) Johan Gjønnes Nilsen (interim) | 27 August 2021 | 16th |
| Ull/Kisa | (Norway) Arild Sundgot | Sacked | 3 October 2021 | 14th | (Norway) Steffen Landro | 5 October 2021 | 14th |

== League table ==
| Pos | Team | Pld | W | D | L | GF | GA | GD | Pts | Promotion, qualification or relegation |
|---|---|---|---|---|---|---|---|---|---|---|
| 1 | HamKam (C, P) | 30 | 21 | 6 | 3 | 62 | 21 | +41 | 69 | Promotion to Eliteserien |
| 2 | Aalesund (P) | 30 | 16 | 10 | 4 | 68 | 43 | +25 | 58 | Promotion to Eliteserien |
| 3 | Jerv (O, P) | 30 | 15 | 9 | 6 | 49 | 46 | +3 | 54 | Qualification for the promotion play-offs |
| 4 | Fredrikstad | 30 | 15 | 7 | 8 | 60 | 42 | +18 | 52 | Qualification for the promotion play-offs |
| 5 | KFUM Oslo | 30 | 12 | 8 | 10 | 46 | 45 | +1 | 44 | Qualification for the promotion play-offs |
| 6 | Sogndal | 30 | 11 | 9 | 10 | 40 | 35 | +5 | 42 | Qualification for the promotion play-offs |
| 7 | Åsane | 30 | 11 | 7 | 12 | 44 | 53 | −9 | 40 | |
| 8 | Sandnes Ulf | 30 | 10 | 9 | 11 | 43 | 49 | −6 | 39 | |
| 9 | Start | 30 | 10 | 8 | 12 | 59 | 59 | 0 | 38 | |
| 10 | Bryne | 30 | 11 | 4 | 15 | 44 | 48 | −4 | 37 | |
| 11 | Raufoss | 30 | 10 | 5 | 15 | 51 | 54 | −3 | 34 (Note: Raufoss have been deducted 1 point.) | |
| 12 | Ranheim | 30 | 9 | 7 | 14 | 56 | 62 | −6 | 34 | |
| 13 | Grorud | 30 | 10 | 4 | 16 | 45 | 59 | −14 | 34 | |
| 14 | Stjørdals-Blink (O) | 30 | 8 | 7 | 15 | 32 | 50 | −18 | 31 | Qualification for the relegation play-offs |
| 15 | Ull/Kisa (R) | 30 | 7 | 8 | 15 | 34 | 50 | −16 | 29 | Relegation to Second Division |
| 16 | Strømmen (R) | 30 | 4 | 12 | 14 | 32 | 49 | −17 | 24 | Relegation to Second Division |

Source: Soccerway, NIFS
Rules for classification: 1) Points; 2) Goal difference; 3) Goals scored; 4) Head-to-head points; 5) Head-to-head goal difference; 6) Head-to-head away goals scored (only if between two teams); 7) Head-to-head goals scored; 8) Play-off (only used to decide champions or relegation).
(C) Champions; (O) Play-off winners; (P) Promoted; (R) Relegated

== Results ==
| Home \ Away | AAL | BRY | FRE | GRO | HAM | JER | KFU | RAN | RAU | ULF | SOG | STA | STJ | STR | ULL | ÅSA |
|---|---|---|---|---|---|---|---|---|---|---|---|---|---|---|---|---|
| Aalesund | — | 2–1 | 2–2 | 6–2 | 1–1 | 1–1 | 1–0 | 1–1 | 4–2 | 2–2 | 3–0 | 3–2 | 5–1 | 3–2 | 4–2 | 2–0 |
| Bryne | 2–3 | — | 0–1 | 3–2 | 1–1 | 2–0 | 1–1 | 5–2 | 3–1 | 0–1 | 0–1 | 4–2 | 1–0 | 0–2 | 2–0 | 1–1 |
| Fredrikstad | 2–2 | 3–1 | — | 2–2 | 0–1 | 4–0 | 2–1 | 3–1 | 1–1 | 2–1 | 2–1 | 2–2 | 5–1 | 3–1 | 2–0 | 2–3 |
| Grorud | 1–2 | 4–2 | 1–2 | — | 1–2 | 2–3 | 2–2 | 3–2 | 2–1 | 1–0 | 1–2 | 1–4 | 1–2 | 1–0 | 0–2 | 3–2 |
| HamKam | 2–3 | 3–0 | 1–0 | 2–2 | — | 3–1 | 3–0 | 3–0 | 2–1 | 3–1 | 2–1 | 3–2 | 3–0 | 2–0 | 3–0 | 1–2 |
| Jerv | 2–2 | 2–1 | 3–2 | 0–0 | 0–2 | — | 1–1 | 2–1 | 2–0 | 1–0 | 1–0 | 3–2 | 2–1 | 1–1 | 3–3 | 3–1 |
| KFUM Oslo | 2–4 | 0–1 | 2–1 | 2–0 | 0–2 | 4–1 | — | 2–1 | 3–2 | 1–1 | 3–1 | 0–2 | 1–0 | 1–1 | 4–0 | 3–1 |
| Ranheim | 3–3 | 2–4 | 1–1 | 1–0 | 0–4 | 3–4 | 1–3 | — | 4–2 | 4–0 | 0–4 | 1–1 | 1–0 | 5–2 | 5–1 | 2–2 |
| Raufoss | 4–2 | 4–1 | 0–1 | 2–4 | 2–1 | 3–0 | 5–1 | 0–4 | — | 1–0 | 1–2 | 1–3 | 5–2 | 4–2 | 0–2 | 1–1 |
| Sandnes Ulf | 0–0 | 2–0 | 2–1 | 2–3 | 1–2 | 0–2 | 1–1 | 5–4 | 1–1 | — | 0–2 | 1–2 | 2–1 | 3–2 | 2–1 | 3–2 |
| Sogndal | 2–0 | 0–0 | 1–2 | 1–0 | 1–1 | 1–1 | 3–2 | 1–2 | 2–1 | 2–2 | — | 1–1 | 1–1 | 1–1 | 1–1 | 3–1 |
| Start | 2–0 | 2–3 | 2–6 | 3–0 | 1–4 | 2–4 | 2–3 | 3–1 | 1–1 | 2–2 | 1–1 | — | 4–1 | 3–2 | 1–3 | 1–1 |
| Stjørdals-Blink | 1–0 | 2–1 | 3–0 | 2–0 | 0–1 | 2–2 | 1–1 | 1–0 | 0–1 | 1–2 | 2–1 | 2–2 | — | 1–1 | 0–0 | 0–1 |
| Strømmen | 0–0 | 0–2 | 1–1 | 1–3 | 0–0 | 2–3 | 1–1 | 0–0 | 1–1 | 2–2 | 0–2 | 2–1 | 1–2 | — | 2–1 | 1–0 |
| Ull/Kisa | 0–1 | 2–1 | 3–2 | 1–2 | 0–0 | 0–0 | 0–1 | 1–1 | 0–2 | 1–2 | 2–1 | 1–3 | 4–1 | 0–0 | — | 0–1 |
| Åsane | 1–6 | 2–1 | 2–3 | 3–1 | 0–4 | 0–1 | 3–0 | 1–3 | 2–1 | 2–2 | 1–0 | 2–0 | 1–1 | 2–1 | 3–3 | — |

Source: Norwegian Football Federation (in Norwegian), NIFS (in Norwegian)
Legend: Blue = home team win; Yellow = draw; Red = away team win.

== Play-offs ==
=== Promotion play-offs ===
The teams from third to sixth place will take part in the promotion play-offs; these are single leg knockout matches. In the first round, the fifth-placed team will play at home against the sixth-placed team. The winner of the first round will meet the fourth-placed team on away ground in the second round. The winner of the second round will meet the third-placed team on away ground. The winner of the third round will advance to play the 14th-placed team in the Eliteserien on neutral ground in the Eliteserien play-offs for a spot in the top-flight next season.

First round
5 | KFUM Oslo | 1
6 | Sogndal | 0

Second round
4 | Fredrikstad | 3 (4)
5 | KFUM Oslo (p) | 3 (5)

Third round
3 | Jerv (p) | 1 (5)
5 | KFUM Oslo | 1 (3)

First round

1 December 2021
18:00 CET

| KFUM Oslo | 1–0 | Sogndal |
|---|---|---|
| Njie 51' | Report |

Intility Arena, Oslo
Attendance: 864
Referee: Christian Moen

Second round

6 December 2021
18:00 CET

| Fredrikstad | 3–3 (a.e.t.) | KFUM Oslo |
|---|---|---|
| Johansen 64', 88'; Maikel 112' | Report | Sanyang 27'; Njie 36', 120+3' |
Penalties
| Øby (penalty missed); Solberg (penalty scored); Hadzic (penalty scored); Maikel (penalty scored); Nielsen (penalty scored) | 4–5 | (penalty scored) Tavakoli; (penalty scored) Alm; (penalty scored) Mahnin; (penalty scored) Njie; (penalty scored) Nuñez |

Fredrikstad Stadion, Fredrikstad
Attendance: 2,153
Referee: Kristoffer Hagenes

Third round

12 December 2021
15:00 CET

| Jerv | 1–1 (a.e.t.) | KFUM Oslo |
|---|---|---|
| Norheim 81' | Report | Nuñez 50' |
Penalties
| Campos (penalty scored); Wichmann (penalty scored); Arrocha (penalty scored); Norheim (penalty scored); Novak (penalty scored) | 5–3 | (penalty missed) Tavakoli; (penalty scored) Alm; (penalty scored) Mahnin; (penalty scored) Njie |

Levermyr Stadion, Grimstad
Attendance: 1,486
Referee: Sivert Amland

=== Relegation play-offs ===
The 14th-placed team, Stjørdals-Blink, took part in a two-legged play-off against the winners of the Second Division play-offs, Hødd, to decide who would play in the First Division next season.

1 December 2021
19:00 CET

| Hødd | 3–2 | Stjørdals-Blink |
|---|---|---|
| Skeide 38'; Wrele 43'; Saunes 63' | Report | Bjørnholm-Jatta 7'; Lillebo 76' |

Høddvoll, Ulsteinvik
Attendance: 803
Referee: Daniel Higraff
4 December 2021
16:00 CET

| Stjørdals-Blink | 3–0 | Hødd |
|---|---|---|
| Bjørnholm-Jatta 4'; Lillebo 10', 75' | Report |

M.U.S Stadion, Stjørdalshalsen
Attendance: 618
Referee: Steinar Hauge

Stjørdals-Blink won 5–3 on aggregate.

== Season statistics ==
=== Top scorers ===
| Rank | Player | Club | Goals |
|---|---|---|---|
| 1 | (Norway) Oscar Aga | Grorud | 24 |
| 2 | (Norway) Sigurd Hauso Haugen | Aalesund | 21 |
| 3 | (Norway) Elias Hoff Melkersen | Ranheim | 17 |
| 4 | (Norway) Eman Markovic | Start | 16 |
| 5 | (Norway) Jonas Enkerud | HamKam | 14 |
| 6 | (Norway) Kristian Eriksen | HamKam | 13 |
| 6 | (Norway) Erlend Hustad | Sandnes Ulf | 13 |
| 6 | (Nigeria) Taofeek Ismaheel | Fredrikstad | 13 |
| 9 | (Norway) Joacim Holtan | Bryne | 11 |
| 9 | (The Gambia) Alagie Sanyang | KFUM Oslo | 11 |
| 9 | (Norway) Nicolay Solberg | Fredrikstad | 11 |

== Awards ==
=== Monthly awards ===
| Month | Coach of the Month | | Player of the Month | | Young Player of the Month | | References |
| Month | Coach | Club | Player | Club | Player | Club | References |
|---|---|---|---|---|---|---|---|
| June | (Norway) Kjetil Rekdal | HamKam | (Norway) Oscar Aga | Grorud | (Norway) Vetle Skjærvik | HamKam | |
| July | (Norway) Bjørn Johansen | Fredrikstad | (Norway) Nicolay Solberg | Fredrikstad | (Norway) Elias Melkersen | Ranheim | |
| August | (Norway) Kjetil Rekdal | HamKam | (Norway) Kristian Eriksen | HamKam | (Norway) Oscar Aga | Grorud | |
| September | (Norway) Lars Arne Nilsen | Aalesund | (Norway) Simen Bolkan Nordli | Aalesund | (Nigeria) Taofeek Ismaheel | Fredrikstad | |
| October | (Norway) Johan Gjønnes Nilsen | Grorud | (Norway) Simen Bolkan Nordli | Aalesund | (Norway) Elias Melkersen | Ranheim | |

=== Annual awards ===
| Award | Winner | Club |
|---|---|---|
| Coach of the Year | (Norway) Kjetil Rekdal | HamKam |
| Player of the Year | (Norway) Kristian Eriksen | HamKam |
| Breakthrough of the Year | (Nigeria) Taofeek Ismaheel | Fredrikstad |
