= Nicolay Solberg =

Norwegian footballer (born 1991)

Personal information
- Date of birth: 9 July 1991 (age 35)
- Place of birth: Tønsberg, Norway
- Height: 1.80 m (5 ft 11 in)
- Position: Midfielder

Youth career
- Borre
- Ørn-Horten
- American Community School, Dubai

Senior career*
| Years | Team | Apps | (Gls) |
| 2009–2010 | Tønsberg | | |
| 2011–2013 | Lillestrøm | 7 | (0) |
| 2012 | → Sarpsborg 08 (loan) | 30 | (14) |
| 2013–2014 | Fredrikstad | 13 | (2) |
| 2015 | Sandefjord 2 | 2 | (0) |
| 2015 | Ullern | 8 | (5) |
| 2016–2018 | Ullensaker/Kisa | 79 | (31) |
| 2019–2022 | Fredrikstad | 98 | (36) |
- * Club domestic league appearances and goals

Nicolay Solberg (born 9 July 1991) is a Norwegian former footballer.

== Career ==
Solber made his debut for Lillestrøm on 20 March 2011 against Stabæk, a game they won 7–0. In 2012, he was loaned out to Sarpsborg 08 where he scored 14 goals.

Before the 2013 season he signed a contract with Fredrikstad.

After a lengthy battle with injuries, he signed for amateur team Sandefjord 2 in the summer of 2015, only to rapidly move on to third-tier club Ullern IF. In 2016, he went up another notch, to second-tier club Ullensaker/Kisa. He left the club at the end of 2018.

On 14 January 2019, Solberg signed with Norwegian 2. divisjon club Fredrikstad FK.

== Career statistics ==
| Season | Club | Division | League | | Cup | | Total | |
| Season | Club | Division | Apps | Goals | Apps | Goals | Apps | Goals |
|---|---|---|---|---|---|---|---|---|
| 2011 | Lillestrøm | Tippeligaen | 7 | 0 | 3 | 0 | 10 | 0 |
| 2012 | Sarpsborg 08 | Adeccoligaen | 30 | 14 | 2 | 2 | 32 | 16 |
| 2013 | Fredrikstad | Adeccoligaen | 13 | 2 | 2 | 2 | 15 | 4 |
| 2014 | Fredrikstad | 1. divisjon | 0 | 0 | 0 | 0 | 0 | 0 |
| 2015 | Sandefjord 2 | 3. divisjon | 2 | 0 | 0 | 0 | 2 | 0 |
| 2015 | Ullern | Oddsen-ligaen | 8 | 5 | 0 | 0 | 8 | 5 |
| 2016 | Ull/Kisa | OBOS-ligaen | 28 | 11 | 1 | 0 | 29 | 11 |
| 2017 | Ull/Kisa | OBOS-ligaen | 27 | 11 | 1 | 0 | 28 | 11 |
| 2018 | Ull/Kisa | OBOS-ligaen | 23 | 10 | 2 | 2 | 25 | 12 |
| 2019 | Fredrikstad | PostNord-ligaen | 20 | 1 | 2 | 1 | 22 | 2 |
| 2020 | Fredrikstad | PostNord-ligaen | 19 | 13 | 0 | 0 | 19 | 13 |
| 2021 | Fredrikstad | OBOS-ligaen | 16 | 11 | 0 | 0 | 16 | 11 |
| Career Total | | | 193 | 78 | 13 | 7 | 206 | 85 |

== Honours ==
Individual

- Norwegian First Division Player of the Month: July 2021
