= Håvar Jenssen =

Norwegian footballer (born 1996)

Personal information
- Full name: Håvar Grøntvedt Jenssen
- Date of birth: 10 April 1996 (age 30)
- Height: 1.93 m (6 ft 4 in)
- Position: Goalkeeper

Team information
- Current team: KFUM
- Number: 25

Youth career
- –2011: Ekholt
- 2012–2014: Fredrikstad

Senior career*
Years	Team	Apps	(Gls)
2011	Ekholt		
2013–2025	Fredrikstad	220	(0)
2024	→ Tromsø (loan)	2	(0)
2025–2026	Sarpsborg 08	1	(0)
2026–	KFUM	6	(0)

International career
2013	Norway U17	1	(0)
- * Club domestic league appearances and goals as of 7 August 2026

Håvar Grøntvedt Jenssen (born 10 April 1996) is a Norwegian football goalkeeper who currently plays for KFUM.

== Career ==
Jenssen grew up in Ekholt in the outskirts of Rygge, almost within the city of Moss. He made his senior debut in the Seventh Division, the eighth tier in Norwegian football, for Ekholt BK in early 2011. While still in lower secondary school, Jenssen trained with the U19 team of Fredrikstad FK twice a week. On advice from his youth coach, he did not join neighboring club Moss FK. He instead moved to Fredrikstad permanently in 2012. In 2013 he made his senior debut, in the First Division, and in 2015 he made a breakthrough as he played 20 of the 30 league games.

In 2017, Jenssen was the unequivocal first-choice goalkeeper of Fredrikstad, until he was benched with two league games remaining. Fredrikstad struggled against relegation for an extended period, and ended up losing the playoff. During Fredrikstad's stay in the Second Division, Jenssen was their goalkeeper during the 2018, 2019 and the 2020 seasons (the latter being curtailed due to COVID-19). During those years, Jenssen became noted for his many clean sheets, and was intermittently called a "saviour" by the local newspaper.

In the summer of 2022 Jenssen surpassed 200 league games for Fredrikstad, as well as 50 clean sheets. Fredrikstad then won the 2023 1. divisjon, finally achieving re-promotion to the Eliteserien. Jenssen recorded 11 clean sheets during the season, and was given a new contract to possibly become an Eliteserien goalkeeper. TV 2 named him in the Team of the Year. Nettavisen also named him the best goalkeeper, as well as the 9th best overall player in the 2023 1. divisjon.

Nonetheless, he was not given a single chance by Fredrikstad in the 2024 Eliteserien. The club instead played Jonathan Fischer, whom the manager hailed as a "future Premier League player". Following an injury to Jakob Haugaard, Jenssen was loaned by Tromsø IL in the summer of 2024, instantly making his Eliteserien debut there—with a clean sheet against Strømsgodset. A week later, he also made his debut in European football, keeping a clean sheet away against KuPS. When returning to Fredrikstad after three Tromsø games, conceding no goals, Jenssen stated that the loan boosted his self-confidence.

== Personal life ==
Outside of football, Håvar Jenssen chose to study law. He followed remote studies at the University of Tromsø, describing his study patterns as short snippets of time here and there. He was in the middle tier regarding how Fredrikstad paid its players. Hobbies included YouTube-inspired cooking and painting. He resided at Kråkerøy.

== Career statistics ==
As of 7 August 2026

Appearances and goals by club, season and competition
Club	Season	League			National Cup		Europe		Other		Total	
Club	Season	Division	Apps	Goals	Apps	Goals	Apps	Goals	Apps	Goals	Apps	Goals
Fredrikstad	2013	1. divisjon	2	0	3	0	—		—		5	0
Fredrikstad	2014	1. divisjon	1	0	1	0	—		—		2	0
Fredrikstad	2015	1. divisjon	20	0	2	0	—		—		22	0
Fredrikstad	2016	1. divisjon	9	0	2	0	—		—		11	0
Fredrikstad	2017	1. divisjon	28	0	1	0	—		—		29	0
Fredrikstad	2018	2. divisjon	26	0	2	0	—		2 (Note: Appearances in 2. divisjon promotion play-offs)	0	30	0
Fredrikstad	2019	2. divisjon	26	0	2	0	—		—		28	0
Fredrikstad	2020	2. divisjon	18	0	—		—		—		18	0
Fredrikstad	2021	1. divisjon	30	0	2	0	—		1 (Note: Appearance in Eliteserien play-offs)	0	33	0
Fredrikstad	2022	1. divisjon	30	0	3	0	—		—		33	0
Fredrikstad	2023	1. divisjon	30	0	2	0	—		—		32	0
Fredrikstad	2024	Eliteserien	0	0	2	0	—		—		2	0
Fredrikstad	Total		220	0	22	0	—		3	0	245	0
Tromsø (loan)	2024	Eliteserien	2	0	0	0	1 (Note: Appearance in UEFA Conference League)	0	—		3	0
Sarpsborg 08	2025	Eliteserien	1	0	0	0	—		—		1	0
KFUM	2026	Eliteserien	6	0	1	0	—		—		7	0
Career total			229	0	23	0	1	0	3	0	256	0
