= Ranheim Fotball =

Norwegian football club

- Full name: Ranheim Fotball
- Founded: 17 February 1901; 125 years ago
- Ground: EXTRA Arena
- Capacity: 3,000
- Head coach: Christian Eggen Rismark
- League: 1. divisjon
- 2026: 1. divisjon, 7th of 16
- Website: www.ranheimfotball.no
Home colours	Away colours	Third colours

Ranheim Fotball is a Norwegian football club from Ranheim in Trondheim that currently plays in 1. divisjon, the second tier in the Norwegian football league system. Ranheim is the football department of Ranheim IL, founded on 17 February 1901.

== History ==
Ranheim played in the Norwegian top flight during the following seasons; 1937–38, 1938–39, 1939–40 and 1947–48, as well as in 1949–50, 1952–53, 1954–55 and 1955–56.

Since 2006, Ranheim has acted as a farm club for Rosenborg, its goal being to establish a football team from Trøndelag in the 1. divisjon. Ranheim came close to qualifying in 2007 and 2008. Former manager Per Joar Hansen earned Ranheim a promotion to the 1. divisjon after the 2009 season. They played their first 6 home matches at Abrahallen, and on 10 July 2010, they moved to their new stadium, EXTRA Arena. Ranheim finished 5th in the 2010 1. divisjon and qualified for the promotion play-offs for a place in the Tippeligaen.

In the 2017 season, Ranheim gained promotion to the top level for the first time since 1955–56 after beating Sogndal. Over two legs, they first lost 1–0 away and went on to win 1–0 at home. After two scoreless periods of extra time they secured promotion by winning 5–4 on penalties. Ranheim finished the 2018 season in 7th place, and head coach Svein Maalen received the Eliteserien Coach of the Year award for this accomplishment. In the following 2019 season, the club finished 16th and last and were relegated.

== Current squad ==
As of 4 September 2026

Note: Flags indicate national team as defined under FIFA eligibility rules; some limited exceptions apply. Players may hold more than one non-FIFA nationality.

No.	Pos.	Nation	Player
1	GK	NOR	Jacob Storevik
2	DF	NOR	Philip Slørdahl (captain)
3	DF	NOR	Christoffer Aasbak
4	DF	NOR	Thomas Kongerud
5	DF	FIN	Noah Pallas (on loan from Vålerenga)
6	MF	NOR	Lucas Kolstad
7	FW	ERI	Maill Lundgren (on loan from Shelbourne)
8	MF	NOR	Oliver Holden
9	FW	NOR	Sebastian Haugland
10	MF	NOR	Mikael Tørset Johnsen
11	FW	SEN	Maurice Sylva
12	GK	NOR	Oliver Madsen
15	DF	NOR	Karl Martin Rolstad

No.	Pos.	Nation	Player
17	MF	LBR	Franklin Nyenetue
19	DF	NOR	Jonas Pereira
20	FW	NOR	Andreas Fossli
21	MF	NOR	Elias Solberg
22	DF	NOR	Tage Haukeberg
23	MF	NOR	Gjermund Åsen
24	DF	NOR	Håkon Gangstad
25	MF	NOR	Leander Skammelsrud
26	MF	NOR	Stian Sjøvold Thorstensen (on loan from Vålerenga)
27	FW	DEN	Gustav Mogensen
28	MF	NOR	John Kenneth Provido Gundersen
32	DF	GHA	Daniel Asiedu
33	FW	NOR	Lucas Neverland

For season transfers, see transfers winter 2025–26 and transfers summer 2026.

=== Out on loan ===
Note: Flags indicate national team as defined under FIFA eligibility rules; some limited exceptions apply. Players may hold more than one non-FIFA nationality.

No.	Pos.	Nation	Player
13	DF	NOR	Marius Valle Fagerhaug (at Stjørdals-Blink until 31 December 2026)
—	FW	NOR	Jon Berisha (at Hødd until 31 December 2026)
—	FW	NOR	Dennis Torp-Helland (at Stjørdals-Blink until 31 December 2026)

=== Coaching staff ===
Position	Name
Manager	Christian Eggen Rismark
Assistant coach	Pål André Helland
Goalkeeper coach	Anders Vegge

=== Administrative staff ===
Position	Name
Chief executive officer	Frank Lidahl
Chairman	Kolbjørn Selmer
Sports director	Kåre Ingebrigtsen
Head of Administration	Ivar A. Sandvik

== Recent history ==
Season		Pos.	Pl.	W	D	L	GS	GA	P	Cup	Notes
2001	2. divisjon	↓ 14	26	6	2	18	37	68	20	Second round	Relegated to the 3. divisjon
2002	3. divisjon	3	22	14	3	5	73	25	45	Second round	
2003	3. divisjon	2	22	18	2	2	100	31	56	First round	
2004	3. divisjon	↑ 1	22	20	0	2	110	20	60	Second qualifying round	Promoted to the 2. divisjon
2005	2. divisjon	8	26	11	5	10	63	54	38	Second round	
2006	2. divisjon	3	26	13	6	7	63	40	45	Second round	
2007	2. divisjon	3	26	14	7	5	58	28	49	Second round	
2008	2. divisjon	2	26	16	4	6	74	32	52	Third round	
2009	2. divisjon	↑ 1	26	17	4	5	64	21	55	Third round	Promoted to the 1. divisjon
2010	1. divisjon	5	28	12	7	9	38	38	43	Quarterfinal	Lost play-offs for promotion
2011	1. divisjon	4	30	15	7	8	61	39	52	Third round	
2012	1. divisjon	7	30	11	10	9	55	40	43	First round	
2013	1. divisjon	4	30	14	7	9	49	38	49	Fourth round	Lost play-offs for promotion
2014	1. divisjon	7	30	13	7	10	45	34	46	Fourth round	
2015	1. divisjon	6	30	13	8	9	48	36	47	Third round	
2016	1. divisjon	9	30	11	6	13	45	48	39	Second round	
2017	1. divisjon	↑ 4	30	15	7	8	48	39	52	Third round	Promoted to Eliteserien through play-offs
2018	Eliteserien	7	30	12	6	12	43	50	42	Fourth round	
2019	Eliteserien	↓ 16	30	7	6	17	36	55	27	Semifinal	Relegated to 1. divisjon
2020	1. divisjon	4	30	13	8	9	61	41	47	Cancelled	
2021	1. divisjon	12	30	9	7	13	56	62	34	Third round	
2022	1. divisjon	8	30	12	7	11	49	52	43	Fourth round	
2023	1. divisjon	8	30	12	4	14	36	53	40	Third round	
2024	1. divisjon	10	30	10	9	11	48	46	39	Third round	
2025	1. divisjon	6	30	14	6	10	48	48	48	Third round	Lost play-offs for promotion
2026	1. divisjon	7	30	12	5	13	74	72	41	First round	

== Head coaches ==
- Kåre Ingebrigtsen (2006–2007)
- Tore Grønning (2007–2008)
- Per Joar Hansen (2008–2010)
- Aasmund Bjørkan (2011–2012)
- Trond Nordsteien (2013–2015)
- Ola By Rise (2015)
- Svein Maalen (2015–2021)
- Hugo Pereira (2021–2023)
- Kåre Ingebrigtsen (2023–2024)
- Christian Eggen Rismark (2025–)
