= Robin Bjørnholm-Jatta =

Footballer (born 1994)

Personal information
- Full name: Robin Utseth Bjørnholm-Jatta
- Date of birth: 27 January 1994 (age 32)
- Place of birth: Trondheim, Norway
- Height: 1.80 m (5 ft 11 in)
- Position: Left-back

Team information
- Current team: Stjørdals-Blink
- Number: 29

Youth career
- 2008–2011: Rosenborg

College career
| Years | Team | Apps | (Gls) |
| 2016–2017 | Coastal Carolina Chanticleers | 19 | (1) |
| 2017–2018 | Stony Brook Seawolves | 18 | (3) |

Senior career*
| Years | Team | Apps | (Gls) |
| 2011–2012 | Rosenborg 3 | 14 | (5) |
| 2011–2013 | Rosenborg 2 | 27 | (6) |
| 2013 | Skjetten | 11 | (5) |
| 2014 | Elverum 2 | 1 | (0) |
| 2014 | Elverum | 10 | (0) |
| 2015 | KFUM 2 | 6 | (6) |
| 2015–2016 | KFUM | 12 | (4) |
| 2018–2020 | Byåsen | 36 | (5) |
| 2020– | Stjørdals-Blink | 48 | (2) |

International career^{‡}
| 2009 | Norway U15 | 1 | (1) |
| 2010 | Norway U16 | 3 | (0) |
| 2021– | Gambia | 1 | (1) |
- * Club domestic league appearances and goals as of 15:42, 4 December 2021 (UTC) ‡ National team caps and goals as of 06:25, 6 June 2021 (UTC)

Robin Utseth Bjørnholm-Jatta (born 27 January 1994) is a professional footballer who plays as a left-back for Stjørdals-Blink. Born in Norway, he plays for the Gambia national team.

== Club career ==
A youth product of Rosenborg's youth academy, Bjørnholm-Jatta began his career with their reserve side. He then moved to the Norwegian semi-pro clubs Skjetten, Elverum, and KFUM before spending time in the US college system with Coastal Carolina Chanticleers and the Stony Brook Seawolves. He returned to Norway in 2018, signing with Byåsen.

== International career ==
Bjørnholm-Jatta was born in Norway to a Gambian father and Norwegian mother. He was a youth international for Norway. He received his first call-up to the senior Gambia national team in October 2020. He debuted for the Gambia in a 2–0 friendly win over Niger on 6 June 2021.
