= Jonathan Fischer =

Danish footballer (born 2001)

Personal information
- Full name: Jonathan Frost Fischer
- Date of birth: 9 November 2001 (age 25)
- Place of birth: Copenhagen, Denmark
- Height: 1.98 m (6 ft 6 in)
- Position: Goalkeeper

Team information
- Current team: Metz
- Number: 1

Youth career
- 2014–2019: AB
- 2018: → Brøndby (loan)

Senior career*
Years	Team	Apps	(Gls)
2019–2022	AB	73	(0)
2022–2024	Hobro	19	(0)
2024–2025	Fredrikstad	47	(0)
2025–	Metz	27	(0)

International career^{‡}
2019	Denmark U19	2	(0)
- * Club domestic league appearances and goals as of 20 May 2026 ‡ National team caps and goals as of 15:26, 7 July 2025 (UTC)

Jonathan Frost Fischer (born 9 November 2001) is a Danish professional football player who plays as a goalkeeper for Ligue 2 club Metz.

== Career ==
Fischer is a product of the youth academy of the Danish club AB since the age of 13, debuting with them in the Danish 2nd Division in 2019. On 27 June 2022, Fischer transferred to Hobro in the Danish 1st Division on a contract until 2025. On 10 January 2024, he transferred to the Norwegian club Fredrikstad on a contract until December 2028. On 7 December 2024, he started for Fredrikstad in the 2024 Norwegian Football Cup final where they won on penalty shootout.

On 29 July 2025, Fischer transferred to the French Ligue 1 club Metz on a contract until 2029.

== International career ==
Fischer made 2 appearances for the Denmark U19s in 2019.

== Career statistics ==
As of match played 17 May 2026

Appearances and goals by club, season and competition
Club	Season	League			Cup		Other		Total	
Club	Season	Division	Apps	Goals	Apps	Goals	Apps	Goals	Apps	Goals
AB	2018–19	Danish 2nd Division	1	0	—		—		1	0
AB	2019–20	Danish 2nd Division	18	0	3	0	—		21	0
AB	2020–21	Danish 2nd Division	25	0	2	0	—		27	0
AB	2021–22	Danish 2nd Division	29	0	0	0	—		29	0
AB	Total		73	0	5	0	—		78	0
Hobro	2022–23	Danish 1st Division	1	0	0	0	0	0	1	0
Hobro	2023–24	Danish 1st Division	18	0	2	0	—		20	0
Hobro	Total		19	0	2	0	0	0	21	0
Fredrikstad	2024	Eliteserien	30	0	5	0	—		35	0
Fredrikstad	2025	Eliteserien	17	0	1	0	—		18	0
Fredrikstad	Total		47	0	6	0	—		53	0
Metz	2025–26	Ligue 1	27	0	0	0	—		27	0
Career total			166	0	13	0	0	0	179	0

== Honours ==
Fredrikstad

- Norwegian Cup: 2024

Individual

- Eliteserien Player of the Month: May 2024
