= Hugo Pereira =

Portuguese football coach and former player

Personal information
- Full name: Hugo Carlos Rodrigues Ganchinho Pereira
- Date of birth: 6 November 1978 (age 47)
- Place of birth: Portugal
- Position: Striker

Youth career
- 1990–1998: Benfica
- 1995–1996: → Alverca (loan)

Senior career*
Years	Team	Apps	(Gls)
1998–1999	Montijo		
1999–2001	Almada		
2001–2002	Juventude		
2002–2004	Amora	67	(12)
2004–2005	Estrela Vendas Novas	18	(3)
2005–2006	Alcochetense		
2006–2007	Oeiras		

Managerial career
- 2012–2013: Follo (assistant)
- 2013–2016: Rosenborg (player developer)
- 2017–2018: Rosenborg (assistant)
- 2019–2021: Colombia (assistant)
- 2021–2023: Ranheim
- * Club domestic league appearances and goals

Hugo Carlos Rodrigues Ganchinho Pereira (born 6 November 1978), is a Portuguese football coach and former player. He is currently head coach for Ranheim. He was also assistant manager of Kåre Ingebrigtsen at Rosenborg along with Erik Hoftun. During his period at the club, Pereira contributed to two Norwegian league titles, two Norwegian super cup and one Norwegian cup.

== Biography ==
Hugo Pereira was a youth player at Benfica but never managed to take the step up to professional football. After playing amateur football for about 10 years, Pereira retired and instead started pursuing a career as a football manager. Pereira has a master's degree in education and a post-graduation in high performance football coaching from the University of Lisbon. In 2012, Pereira became the assistant manager and academy director of Follo. Due to the club struggling with finances, Pereira stepped down after the season to spare the club money. In 2013, he left for Rosenborg to enter the position of a player developer at the Rosenborg academy. In January 2017 he became the assistant manager of Kåre Ingebrigtsen at Rosenborg alongside Erik Hoftun.

In January 2017, Pereira was chosen as one of two to spend a week with José Mourinho at Manchester United. This came to be through the High Performance Football Coaching course at the University of Lisbon where Mourinho would choose the two that impressed the most. From among several other contenders coincidence had it that the other one chosen to visit José Mourinho was Norwegian Martin Reier, former Follo player at the time Pereira was at Follo who had also attended the course.

=== Managerial statistics ===
As of 11 July 2022

Team	Nat	From	To	Record				
Team	Nat	From	To	G	W	D	L	Win %
Ranheim	(Norway)	7 July 2021	8 January 2023	40	20	7	13	50.00
Total				40	20	7	13	50.00
