= Philip Aukland =

Norwegian footballer (born 1998)

Personal information
- Full name: Philip Sandvik Aukland
- Date of birth: 30 December 1998 (age 27)
- Height: 1.86 m (6 ft 1 in)
- Position: Defender

Team information
- Current team: Aalesund
- Number: 45

Youth career
- –2014: Søgne
- 2015–2016: Start

Senior career*
Years	Team	Apps	(Gls)
2017–2018	Start	0	(0)
2018	→ Arendal (loan)	15	(0)
2019	Fram	15	(4)
2019–2024	Fredrikstad	85	(2)
2025–	Aalesund	16	(0)
- * Club domestic league appearances and goals as of 29 June 2026

Philip Sandvik Aukland (born 30 December 1998) is a Norwegian footballer who plays as a defender for Aalesund.

== Career ==
Aukland grew up in Søgne Municipality and started his youth career in Søgne FK, moving on to larger neighbours IK Start in 2015. While Aukland was assigned with Start, he was never given a chance to play a competitive match, and was loaned out to Arendal in 2018 before moving on to Fram in 2019. One of the first things he accomplished here was to help eliminate Start from the 2019 Norwegian Football Cup. For Fram, he also scored 4 goals. Before the 2019 season was over, he was bought by Fredrikstad FK.

Aukland helped Fredrikstad win promotion to the 2021 1. divisjon, and became one of manager Bjørn Johansen's "trusted players". His first goal for Fredrikstad came in June 2023 against his former club Start, helping to move Fredrikstad to a promotion position in the table. Aukland also scored both an own goal and a goal against Sogndal in September 2023. Fredrikstad won promotion from the 2023 1. divisjon, and Aukland was a regular for the team in the 2024 Eliteserien.

On 13 February 2025, Aukland signed a four-year contract with Aalesund. He again won promotion, this time from the 2025 1. divisjon to the 2026 Eliteserien.

== Personal life ==
Hobbies included tennis and padel.
