= Lucas Lima (footballer, born 2002) =

Swedish footballer (born 2002)

Personal information
- Full name: Lucas Urbano Dias de Lima
- Date of birth: 2 April 2002 (age 24)
- Place of birth: Rio de Janeiro, Brazil
- Height: 1.89 m (6 ft 2 in)
- Position: Forward

Team information
- Current team: Francs Borains
- Number: 14

Youth career
- –2020: IFK Norrköping

Senior career*
Years	Team	Apps	(Gls)
2018–2022	IFK Norrköping	17	(1)
2018	→ IF Sylvia (loan)	3	(0)
2021	→ Östers IF (loan)	13	(1)
2022–2024	Fredrikstad FK	28	(3)
2023	→ Helsingborgs IF (loan)	12	(3)
2024	→ Utsikten (loan)	28	(7)
2025–	Francs Borains	35	(5)

International career^{‡}
2017	Sweden U15	4	(3)
2018	Sweden U16	6	(0)
- * Club domestic league appearances and goals as of 20 April 2026 ‡ National team caps and goals as of 22 October 2023

Lucas Urbano Dias de Lima (born 2 April 2002) is a Swedish-Brazilian professional footballer who plays as a forward for Francs Borains. Born in Brazil, he has represented Sweden at youth level.

== Career ==
Lima was born in Rio de Janeiro to two Brazilian parents who emigrated to Sweden. Lima quickly adapted to his new country, and became a youth international footballer for Sweden. He attended the academy of IFK Norrköping. He played briefly for Norrköping's cooperation team IF Sylvia in 2018. However, in 2018 he suffered a cruciate ligament injury, which was followed by another. Norrköping manager Rikard Norling stated that Lima would have played in a Big Five league had it not been for the two injuries, or at least "a considerably higher level" than the Swedish league.

Lima made his Allsvenskan debut on 24 May 2021 against Elfsborg. He got his breakthrough on 3 July, when he scored the winning goal at home against giants Malmö. Nonetheless, Lima had to spend the autumn of 2021 on loan at second-tier Östers IF.

The Norwegian second-tier club Fredrikstad FK bought Lima in the summer 2022 transfer window. Lima cited the need for a "change of environment". Fredrikstad struggled against higher-level teams in the 2023 pre-season, but in March 2023, Lima scored in their penultimate friendly match. He thereby ended Fredrikstad's goalless streak of 495 minutes. In the summer, however he was loaned back to Superettan and Helsingborgs IF.

On 21 January 2025, Lima joined Challenger Pro League side Francs Borains on a two-and-a-half year deal.
