= Oscar Aga =

Norwegian footballer (born 2001)

Personal information
- Full name: Oscar Aga
- Date of birth: 6 January 2001 (age 25)
- Place of birth: Oslo, Norway
- Height: 1.80 m (5 ft 11 in)
- Position: Forward

Team information
- Current team: Moss
- Number: 9

Youth career
- –2015: Lyn
- 2016–2018: Stabæk

Senior career*
Years	Team	Apps	(Gls)
2018–2019	Stabæk	11	(0)
2019	→ Grorud (loan)	7	(2)
2020–2021	Grorud	55	(39)
2022–2023	Elfsborg	13	(2)
2023–2026	Rosenborg	11	(1)
2023–2024	→ Fredrikstad (loan)	29	(6)
2025	→ Helsingborg (loan)	28	(6)
2026–	Moss	20	(10)

International career^{‡}
2016	Norway U15	5	(4)
2017	Norway U16	14	(9)
2018	Norway U17	13	(5)
2019	Norway U18	4	(0)
2021	Norway U20	3	(2)
- * Club domestic league appearances and goals as of 14 November 2026 ‡ National team caps and goals as of 15:19, 28 November 2021 (UTC)

Oscar Aga (born 6 January 2001) is a Norwegian footballer who plays as a forward for Moss.

== Career ==
After his time in the youth ranks of the Lyn and Stabæk football clubs, he made his Eliteserien debut against Brann in April 2018. He scored his first goals in the 2019 Norwegian Football Cup, in which he made 5 goals in 3 matches. He was loaned to Grorud at the close of the summer 2019 transfer window.

In 2021, Oscar Aga signed a contract to play for IF Elfsborg; the contract will be in effect until 2025.

On 6 March 2023, Aga signed a deal that would allow him to play for Rosenborg until the end of 2026.

On 26 July 2023, Aga signed a loan deal with Fredrikstad, until the end of the 2023 season. After the season, Fredrikstad announced they had extended the loan until the end of the 2024 season.

On 20 February 2025, Aga joined Swedish Superettan side Helsingborgs IF on loan.

== Career statistics ==
=== Club ===
As of 14 November 2026

Appearances and goals by club, season and competition
Club	Season	League			National Cup (Note: Includes Norwegian Cup, Svenska Cupen)		Europe		Total	
Club	Season	Division	Apps	Goals	Apps	Goals	Apps	Goals	Apps	Goals
Stabæk	2018	Eliteserien	7	0	0	0	—		7	0
Stabæk	2019	Eliteserien	4	0	3	5	—		7	5
Stabæk	Total		11	0	3	5	—		14	5
Grorud (loan)	2019	2. divisjon	7	2	0	0	—		7	2
Grorud	2020	1. divisjon	27	15	—		—		27	15
Grorud	2021	1. divisjon	28	24	3	2	—		31	26
Grorud	Total		62	41	3	2	—		65	43
Elfsborg	2022	Allsvenskan	13	2	3	1	1 (Note: Appearance in UEFA Europa Conference League)	0	17	3
Elfsborg	Total		13	2	3	1	1	0	17	3
Rosenborg	2023	Eliteserien	11	1	3	1	—		14	2
Rosenborg	Total		11	1	3	1	—		14	2
Fredrikstad (loan)	2023	1. divisjon	15	4	0	0	—		15	4
Fredrikstad (loan)	2024	Eliteserien	14	2	4	2	—		18	4
Fredrikstad (loan)	Total		29	6	4	2	—		33	8
Helsingborg (loan)	2025	Superettan	28	6	1	0	—		29	6
Helsingborg (loan)	Total		28	6	1	0	—		29	6
Moss	2026	1. divisjon	20	10	2	0	—		22	10
Moss	Total		20	10	2	0	—		22	10
Career total			174	66	19	11	1	0	194	77

== Honours ==
Fredrikstad

- 1. divisjon: 2023
- Norwegian Cup: 2024

Individual

- Norwegian First Division Player of the Month: June 2021
- Norwegian First Division Young Player of the Month: August 2021
- Norwegian First Division top scorer: 2021
