= Maï Traoré =

Guinean footballer

Personal information
- Full name: Maï Traoré
- Date of birth: 24 November 1999 (age 26)
- Place of birth: Conakry, Guinea
- Height: 1.85 m (6 ft 1 in)
- Position: Forward

Senior career*
| Years | Team | Apps | (Gls) |
| 2016–2017 | FC Aliya Guinée | | |
| 2017–2021 | Vasalunds IF | 81 | (41) |
| 2021–2024 | Viking | 33 | (4) |
| 2023 | → OH Leuven (loan) | 1 | (0) |
| 2023 | → Tromsø (loan) | 15 | (4) |
| 2024–2025 | Fredrikstad | 13 | (2) |
| 2025–2026 | Notts County | 13 | (0) |
| 2026 | → Sligo Rovers (loan) | 16 | (1) |

International career
| 2018 | Guinea U23 | | |
- * Club domestic league appearances and goals as of 14:05, 25 August 2026 (UTC)

Maï Traoré (born 24 November 1999) is a Guinean professional footballer who plays as a forward.

== Club career ==
=== Early career ===
Traoré started his senior career with Congolese club AC Ujana in 2016. In 2017, he joined Swedish club Vasalunds IF. In the first months, he only featured for the club's U19 and U21 teams. He made his senior debut for Vasalund in the 2017–18 Svenska Cupen against Hammarby on 18 February 2018, even scoring a goal. In the 2020 Division 1, he scored 23 goals in 29 matches.

=== Viking ===
In March 2021, he transferred to the Norwegian Eliteserien club Viking FK, signing a four-year contract. He stayed with Vasalund for the first half of the 2021 season, before joining Viking in August 2021. He was given shirt number 24 at his new club. On 8 August 2021, he made his debut against Kristiansund, coming on as a substitute in the 43rd minute for an injured Veton Berisha. On 16 May 2022, he scored his first goal for the club against Jerv.

In January 2023, Traoré joined Belgian First Division A club OH Leuven on loan until the end of the season with an option to make the move permanent. Traoré made his debut for OH Leuven on 4 February 2023, when he came on in the last minute of the 2–1 away loss to Seraing. This would turn out to be his only minute in an OHL-shirt, as a few weeks later on 31 March 2023, Norwegian club Tromsø announced they had taken over the loan deal, including the option to buy.

=== Fredrikstad ===
After ending his loan spell at Tromsø, Traoré signed for fellow Eliteserien club Fredrisktad on a three-year contract.

=== Notts County ===
On 3 February 2025, Traoré signed for Notts County on a two-and-a-half-year contract with the option of another year in the club's favour. On 1 August 2026, Traoré's contract was terminated by mutual consent.

==== Sligo Rovers loan ====
On 18 January 2026, Traoré signed for League of Ireland Premier Division club Sligo Rovers on loan until 30 June 2026. On 27 June 2026, he scored his first goal for the club on his 16th and final appearance, in a 2–2 draw at home to Shelbourne.

== International career ==
Traoré has featured for the Guinea U23 national team. On 15 November 2018, he scored a goal against Mauritania in the 2019 Africa U-23 Cup of Nations qualification.

== Career statistics ==
As of match played on 27 June 2025

Appearances and goals by club, season and competition
| Club | Season | League | | | National Cup (Note: Includes Svenska Cupen, Norwegian Cup & FA Cup) | | League Cup (Note: Includes EFL Cup) | | Europe | | Other | | Total | |
| Club | Season | Division | Apps | Goals | Apps | Goals | Apps | Goals | Apps | Goals | Apps | Goals | Apps | Goals |
|---|---|---|---|---|---|---|---|---|---|---|---|---|---|---|
| Vasalund | 2018 | Division 2 | 24 | 11 | 3 | 1 | — | | — | | — | | 27 | 12 |
| Vasalund | 2019 | Ettan | 18 | 2 | 1 | 0 | — | | — | | — | | 19 | 2 |
| Vasalund | 2020 | Ettan | 29 | 23 | 1 | 0 | — | | — | | — | | 30 | 23 |
| Vasalund | 2021 | Superettan | 10 | 5 | 1 | 0 | — | | — | | — | | 11 | 5 |
| Vasalund | Total | | 81 | 41 | 6 | 1 | — | | — | | — | | 87 | 42 |
| Viking | 2021 | Eliteserien | 10 | 0 | 0 | 0 | — | | — | | — | | 10 | 0 |
| Viking | 2022 | Eliteserien | 23 | 4 | 3 | 0 | — | | 5 (Note: Appearances in the UEFA Europa Conference League) | 2 | — | | 31 | 6 |
| Viking | Total | | 33 | 4 | 3 | 0 | — | | 5 | 2 | — | | 41 | 6 |
| OH Leuven (loan) | 2023 | Belgian Pro League | 1 | 0 | 0 | 0 | — | | — | | — | | 1 | 0 |
| Tromsø (loan) | 2023 | Eliteserien | 15 | 4 | 1 | 0 | — | | — | | — | | 16 | 4 |
| Fredrikstad | 2024 | Eliteserien | 13 | 2 | 0 | 0 | — | | — | | — | | 13 | 2 |
| Notts County | 2024–25 | EFL League Two | 12 | 0 | — | | — | | — | | 2 (Note: Appearances in the 2025 EFL League Two Playoffs) | 0 | 14 | 0 |
| Notts County | 2025–26 | EFL League Two | 1 | 0 | 1 | 0 | 0 | 0 | — | | 2 (Note: Appearances in the EFL Trophy) | 0 | 4 | 0 |
| Notts County | Total | | 13 | 0 | 1 | 0 | 0 | 0 | — | | 4 | 0 | 18 | 0 |
| Sligo Rovers | 2026 | LOI Premier Division | 16 | 1 | — | | — | | — | | — | | 16 | 1 |
| Career total | | | 172 | 52 | 11 | 1 | 0 | 0 | 5 | 2 | 4 | 0 | 192 | 55 |

== Honours ==
Vasalunds IF

- Division 1: 2020

Fredrikstad

- Norwegian Cup: 2024
