= Jeppe Kjær (footballer, born 2004) =

Danish footballer (born 2004)

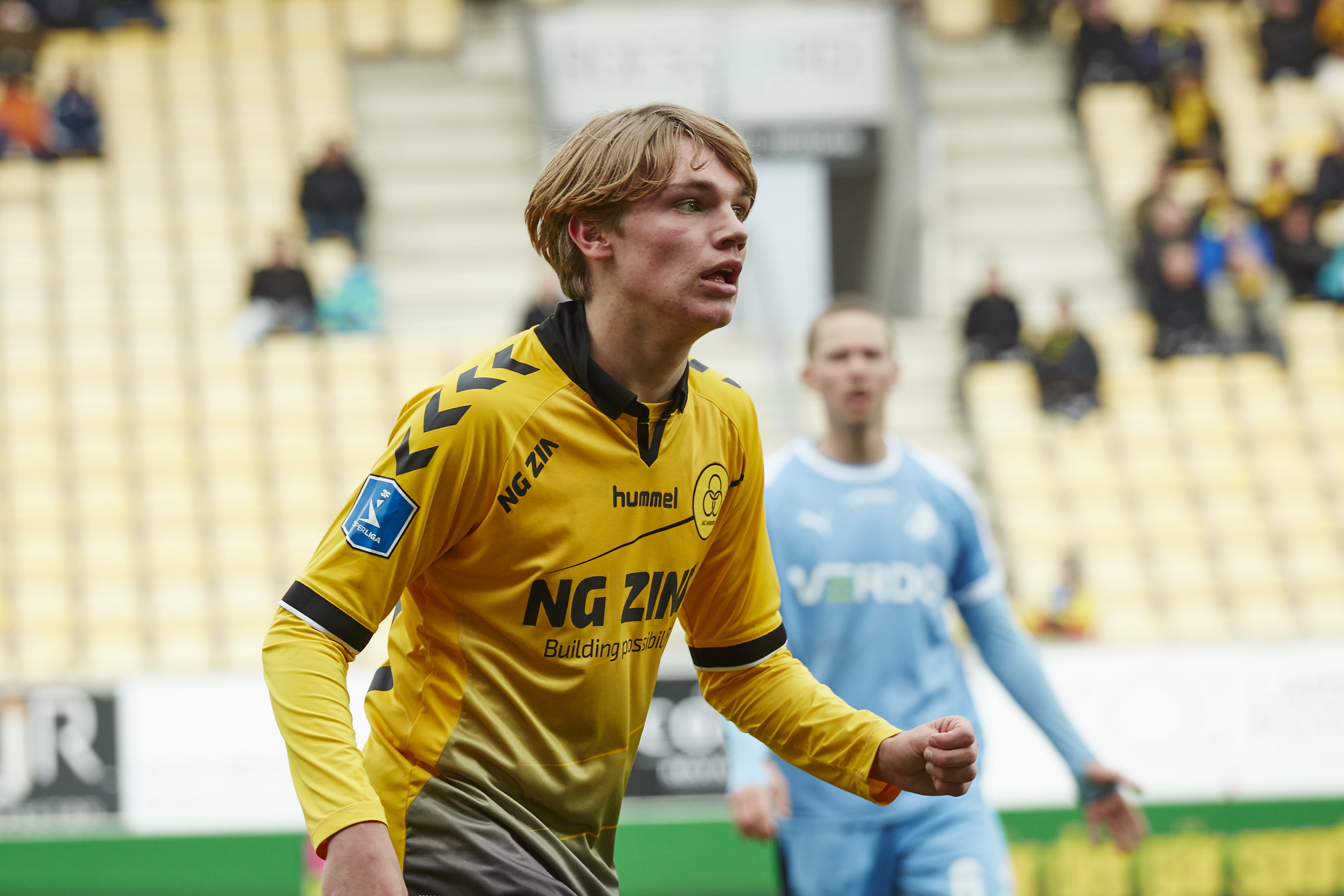

Personal information
- Full name: Jeppe Kjær Jensen
- Date of birth: 1 March 2004 (age 22)
- Place of birth: Horsens, Denmark
- Height: 1.74 m (5 ft 9 in)
- Position: Midfielder

Team information
- Current team: Mjällby
- Number: 10

Youth career
- 2008–2016: Hatting/Torsted
- 2016–2020: Horsens
- 2020–2023: Ajax

Senior career*
Years	Team	Apps	(Gls)
2020	Horsens	9	(1)
2022–2023	Jong Ajax	2	(0)
2023–2025	Bodø/Glimt	6	(0)
2023	→ Sandefjord (loan)	11	(1)
2024	→ Fredrikstad (loan)	24	(3)
2025–	Mjällby	23	(2)

International career
2019–2020	Denmark U-16	9	(1)
2020	Denmark U-17	1	(0)
2021–2022	Denmark U-18	10	(0)
- * Club domestic league appearances and goals as of 16 August 2026

Jeppe Kjær Jensen (born 1 March 2004) is a Danish professional footballer who plays as a midfielder for Allsvenskan club Mjällby.

== Club career ==
=== AC Horsens ===
Kjær joined AC Horsens from local club Hatting/Torsted IF at the age of 12. In the autumn of 2018, Kjær went on two trials at the English club Southampton accompanied by his father, and the talent manager of Horsens, Claus Troelsen. On his 15th birthday, 1 March 2019, Kjær signed a three-year deal with Horsens. On 28 August 2019, the club confirmed that Kjær was going on a trial at Juventus and was going to play in a friendly tournament for the club. In November 2019, Horsens' manager, Bo Henriksen, confirmed that both Juventus and Southampton were ready to sign him, but Horsens eventually refused to let him go.

On Kjær's 16th birthday, 1 March 2020, he made his professional debut for AC Horsens and became the youngest ever to make his debut in the Danish Superliga. Kjær started on the bench, before he replaced Michael Lumb in the 79th minute in a 1–2 defeat against Randers FC.

=== Ajax ===
On 14 August 2020, Dutch club Ajax announced that Kjær would join the club as of 7 September. He signed a three-year contract and was initially included in the youth academy.

After two years in the academy, Kjær got his official debut for Jong Ajax on 12 September 2022 against NAC Breda.

=== Bodø/Glimt ===
On 17 January 2023, it was confirmed that Kjær had joined Norwegian club Bodø/Glimt on a permanent deal, signing a contract until June 2027.

As of August 2023, Kjær had played just 29 minutes for Bodø/Glimt in the Eliteserien, spread over three games. In pursuit of more playing time, on 25 August 2023, Kjær was loaned out to league colleagues Sandefjord, where he would spend the rest of the year. Ahead of the 2024 season, Kjær was loaned out again, this time to Fredrikstad FK.

=== Mjällby ===
On 21 July 2025, Swedish club Mjällby announced the signing of Kjær on a permanent deal, signing a contract until December 2029 for a fee of €700k. He made his debut against Sirius in the Allsvenskan on 27 July 2025.

== Career statistics ==
As of match played 15 August 2026

Appearances and goals by club, season and competition
Club	Season	League			National cup (Note: Includes Danish Cup, Norwegian Cup)		Europe		Total	
Club	Season	Division	Apps	Goals	Apps	Goals	Apps	Goals	Apps	Goals
Horsens	2019–20	Danish Superliga	9	1	2	0	—		11	1
Jong Ajax	2021–22	Eerste Divisie	0	0	—		—		0	0
Jong Ajax	2022–23	Eerste Divisie	2	0	—		—		2	0
Jong Ajax	Total		2	0	—		—		2	0
Bodø/Glimt	2023	Eliteserien	3	0	1	0	—		4	0
Bodø/Glimt	2025	Eliteserien	3	0	1	0	2 (Note: Appearance in UEFA Europa League)	0	6	0
Bodø/Glimt	Total		6	0	2	0	2	0	10	0
Sandefjord (loan)	2023	Eliteserien	11	1	0	0	—		11	1
Fredrikstad (loan)	2024	Eliteserien	24	3	5	3	—		29	6
Mjällby	2025	Allsvenskan	12	0	5	3	—		17	3
Mjällby	2026	Allsvenskan	11	2	0	0	4 (Note: Appearance in UEFA Champions League)	0	15	2
Mjällby	Total		23	2	5	3	4	0	32	5
Career total			75	7	14	6	6	0	95	13

== Honours ==
Fredrikstad

- Norwegian Cup: 2024

Mjällby

- Allsvenskan: 2025
- Svenska Cupen: 2025–26
