= Júlíus Magnússon =

Icelandic footballer

Personal information
- Date of birth: 28 June 1998 (age 28)
- Place of birth: Iceland
- Position: Midfielder

Team information
- Current team: Elfsborg
- Number: 18

Youth career
- –2012: Leiknir Reykjavík
- 2012–2015: Víkingur Reykjavík
- 2015–2019: SC Heerenveen

Senior career*
Years	Team	Apps	(Gls)
2019–2022	Víkingur Reykjavík	78	(7)
2023–2025	Fredrikstad	58	(2)
2025–	Elfsborg	31	(3)

International career^{‡}
2014	Iceland U16	7	(0)
2014–2015	Iceland U17	6	(0)
2016	Iceland U19	5	(0)
2017–2018	Iceland U21	15	(0)
2022–	Iceland	5	(0)
- * Club domestic league appearances and goals as of 8 July 2026 ‡ National team caps and goals as of 18 March 2023

Júlíus Magnússon (born 28 June 1998) is an Icelandic footballer who plays as a midfielder for Swedish club Elfsborg and the Iceland national team.

== Club career ==
He rejoined Víkingur Reykjavík before the 2019 season, having played youth football for SC Heerenveen from 2015 after transferring from Víkingur.

== International career ==
Júlíus made his international debut for Iceland on 9 June 2022 in a friendly match against San Marino.

== Career statistics ==
=== Club ===
As of match played 3 November 2024

Appearances and goals by club, season and competition
Club	Season	League			National cup (Note: Includes Icelandic Cup, Norwegian Cup)		Continental		Other		Total	
Club	Season	Division	Apps	Goals	Apps	Goals	Apps	Goals	Goals	Apps	Goals	Apps
Víkingur Reykjavík	2019	Úrvalsdeild	17	1	4	0	—		—		21	1
Víkingur Reykjavík	2020	Úrvalsdeild	16	0	2	0	1 (Note: Appearance(s) in UEFA Europa League)	0	1 (Note: Appearance(s) in Icelandic Super Cup)	0	20	0
Víkingur Reykjavík	2021	Úrvalsdeild	21	2	4	0	—		—		25	2
Víkingur Reykjavík	2022	Úrvalsdeild	24	4	5	0	8 (Note: Four appearances, One goal in UEFA Champions League, Four appearances in UEFA Europa Conference League)	1	1	0	38	5
Víkingur Reykjavík	Total		78	7	15	0	9	1	2	0	104	8
Fredrikstad	2023	Norwegian First Division	28	0	1	0	—		—		29	0
Fredrikstad	2024	Eliteserien	27	1	4	0	—		—		31	1
Fredrikstad	Total		55	1	5	0	—		—		60	1
Career total			133	8	20	0	9	1	2	0	164	9

== Honours ==
Fredrikstad

- Norwegian Cup: 2024

Víkingur Reykjavík

- Besta deild: 2021
- Icelandic Cup: 2019, 2021, 2022

=== International ===
As of match played 12 January 2023

Appearances and goals by national team and year
National team	Year	Apps	Goals
Iceland	2022	3	0
Iceland	2023	2	0
Total		5	0
