= 2021 Sarpsborg 08 FF season =

Sarpsborg 08
2021 season
- Chairman: Hans Petter Arnesen
- Head coach: Mikael Stahre (until 2 June); Lars Bohinen (from 6 June)
- Stadium: Sarpsborg Stadion
- Eliteserien: 8th
- Norwegian Cup: Fourth round
- Top goalscorer: League: Ibrahima Koné (11); All: Ibrahima Koné (11)
Home colours	Away colours

The 2021 season was Sarpsborg 08 FF's 13th season in existence and the club's 9th consecutive season in the top flight of Norwegian football. In addition to the domestic league, Sarpsborg 08 FF participated in this season's edition of the Norwegian Football Cup.

== Players ==
=== First team squad ===
As of 7 November 2021

Note: Flags indicate national team as defined under FIFA eligibility rules; some limited exceptions apply. Players may hold more than one non-FIFA nationality.

No.	Pos.	Nation	Player
1	GK	NOR	Simen Vidtun Nilsen
2	MF	NOR	Leo Bech Hermansen
3	DF	NOR	Jørgen Horn
4	DF	NOR	Bjørn Inge Utvik
5	DF	NOR	Magnar Ødegaard
6	DF	NOR	Nicolai Næss
7	MF	NOR	Ole Jørgen Halvorsen
8	MF	NOR	Mohamed Ofkir
10	FW	FRA	Rashad Muhammed
11	MF	NOR	Jonathan Lindseth
13	FW	SWE	Guillermo Molins
14	FW	SEN	Amadou Camara
15	MF	NOR	Gaute Høberg Vetti
16	DF	NOR	Joachim Thomassen
17	MF	NOR	Joachim Soltvedt

No.	Pos.	Nation	Player
18	DF	NOR	Sebastian Jarl
20	MF	SWE	Anton Salétros
21	GK	NOR	Anders Kristiansen
22	FW	NOR	Kristian Opseth
24	DF	GUI	Mikael Dyrestam
25	MF	DEN	Mikkel Maigaard
26	FW	BFA	Moubarak Compaoré
27	DF	NOR	Markus Olsvik Welinder
28	DF	CIV	Benjamin Karamoko
29	FW	MLI	Ibrahima Koné
30	FW	NOR	Mustafa Abdellaoue
32	DF	NOR	Eirik Wichne
40	GK	NOR	Leander Øy
77	MF	CRO	Dario Čanađija

=== Out on loan ===
Note: Flags indicate national team as defined under FIFA eligibility rules; some limited exceptions apply. Players may hold more than one non-FIFA nationality.

No.	Pos.	Nation	Player
14	MF	ISL	Emil Pálsson (on loan at Sogndal until 31 December 2021)
19	MF	SEN	Laurent Mendy (on loan at Strømmen until 31 December 2021)

No.	Pos.	Nation	Player
25	FW	NOR	Steffen Lie Skålevik (on loan at Sogndal until 31 December 2021)
27	FW	MLI	Aboubacar Konté (on loan at Nacional until 30 June 2022)

== Transfers ==
=== Winter ===
In: Note: Flags indicate national team as defined under FIFA eligibility rules; some limited exceptions apply. Players may hold more than one non-FIFA nationality.

No.	Pos.	Nation	Player
10	MF	FRA	Rashad Muhammed (from (Turkey) BB Erzurumspor)
13	MF	LBN	Felix Michel Melki (on loan from (Sweden) AIK)
14	MF	ISL	Emil Pálsson (from Sandefjord)
19	MF	SEN	Laurent Mendy (from (Senegal) Oslo Football Academy)
21	GK	NOR	Anders Kristiansen (from (Belgium) Union SG)
22	FW	NOR	Kristian Fardal Opseth (from (India) Bengaluru)
23	MF	BIH	Emir Derviskadic (promoted from junior squad)
25	FW	NOR	Steffen Lie Skålevik (loan return from Start)
28	DF	CIV	Benjamin Karamoko (from Haugesund)
29	FW	MLI	Ibrahima Koné (from Haugesund)
32	DF	NOR	Eirik Wichne (from Start)

Out: Note: Flags indicate national team as defined under FIFA eligibility rules; some limited exceptions apply. Players may hold more than one non-FIFA nationality.

No.	Pos.	Nation	Player
10	FW	SWE	Guillermo Molins (to Rosenborg)
12	GK	CAN	Simon Thomas (to Tromsø)
14	MF	NOR	Tobias Heintz (loan return to (Turkey) Kasımpaşa)
21	MF	BEN	Jordan Adéoti (to (France) Annecy)
24	DF	NOR	Anwar Elyounossi (to (Bulgaria) Botev Plovdiv)
27	FW	MLI	Aboubacar Konté (on loan to Jerv)
28	FW	NOR	Alexander Ruud Tveter (to Sandefjord)
33	GK	MKD	David Mitov Nilsson (to (Sweden) Sirius)
70	MF	EGY	Alexander Jakobsen (to (Egypt) Wadi Degla)
–	DF	CRC	Pablo Arboine (to (Costa Rica) Santos, previously on loan at (Costa Rica) San Carlos)

=== Summer ===
In: Note: Flags indicate national team as defined under FIFA eligibility rules; some limited exceptions apply. Players may hold more than one non-FIFA nationality.

No.	Pos.	Nation	Player
2	DF	NOR	Leo Bech Hermansen (promoted from junior squad)
13	FW	SWE	Guillermo Molins (from Rosenborg)
14	FW	MLI	Amadou Camara (from (Senegal) Oslo FA)
25	MF	DEN	Mikkel Maigaard (from Strømsgodset)
26	FW	BFA	Moubarack Compoaré (from (Senegal) Oslo FA)
77	MF	CRO	Dario Čanađija (from (Romania) Astra Giurgiu)

Out: Note: Flags indicate national team as defined under FIFA eligibility rules; some limited exceptions apply. Players may hold more than one non-FIFA nationality.

No.	Pos.	Nation	Player
2	DF	GAM	Sulayman Bojang (to Haugesund)
13	MF	LBN	Felix Michel Melki (loan return to (Sweden) AIK)
14	MF	ISL	Emil Pálsson (on loan to Sogndal)
19	MF	SEN	Laurent Mendy (on loan to Strømmen)
23	MF	BIH	Emir Derviskadic (to Start)
25	FW	NOR	Steffen Lie Skålevik (on loan to Sogndal)
27	FW	MLI	Aboubacar Konté (on loan to (Portugal) Nacional, previously on loan at Jerv)

== Competitions ==
=== Eliteserien ===
==== Results summary ====
Overall								Home						Away					
Pld	W	D	L	GF	GA	GD	Pts	W	D	L	GF	GA	GD	W	D	L	GF	GA	GD
30	11	6	13	39	44	−5	39	6	5	4	21	14	+7	5	1	9	18	30	−12

Last updated: 12 December 2021.

==== Results by round ====
Round	1	2	3	4	5	6	7	8	9	10	11	12	13	14	15	16	17	18	19	20	21	22	23	24	25	26	27	28	29	30
Ground	H	A	H	A	H	A	H	A	H	A	H	A	H	A	H	A	H	A	H	A	H	A	A	H	A	H	H	A	H	A
Result	D	L	D	D	L	W	D	W	L	L	W	L	D	L	W	L	W	L	L	L	W	L	W	W	W	W	D	W	L	L
Position	6	12	14	14	14	13	12	10	11	12	12	12	12	12	12	12	12	12	12	12	12	12	11	10	10	8	8	8	8	8

A = Away; H = Home; W = Win; D = Draw; L = Loss

==== Matches ====
16 May 2021 3	Sarpsborg 08	0–0	Haugesund	Sarpsborg
15:00 CEST (UTC+2)		Report		Stadium: Sarpsborg Stadion; Attendance: 200; Referee: Rohit Saggi

24 May 2021 4	Odd	1–1	Sarpsborg 08	Skien
15:00 CEST (UTC+2)	Jørgensen 90+2'	Report	Lindseth 27'	Stadium: Skagerak Arena; Attendance: 0 Referee: Dag Vidar Hafsås

27 May 2021 5	Sarpsborg 08	0–1	Kristiansund	Sarpsborg
18:00 CEST (UTC+2)		Report	Kartum 76'	Stadium: Sarpsborg Stadion; Attendance: 600; Referee: Svein Oddvar Moen

30 May 2021 6	Tromsø	0–2	Sarpsborg 08	Tromsø
18:00 CEST (UTC+2)		Report	Koné 12' (pen.); Lindseth 24'	Stadium: Alfheim Stadion; Attendance: 600; Referee: Marius Hansen Grøtta

13 June 2021 7	Sarpsborg 08	0–0	Brann	Sarpsborg
18:00 CEST (UTC+2)		Report		Stadium: Sarpsborg Stadion; Attendance: 600; Referee: Espen Eskås

16 June 2021 16	Molde	4–1	Sarpsborg 08	Molde
18:00 CEST (UTC+2)	Omoijuanfo 51'; Andersen 56'; Bjørnbak 76'; Risa 90+2'	Report	Opseth 84'	Stadium: Aker Stadion; Attendance: 600; Referee: Ola Hobber Nilsen

20 June 2021 8	Rosenborg	0–1	Sarpsborg 08	Trondheim
18:00 CEST (UTC+2)		Report	Thomassen 62'	Stadium: Lerkendal Stadion; Attendance: 600; Referee: Tore Hansen

25 June 2021 9	Sarpsborg 08	1–2	Viking	Sarpsborg
18:00 CEST (UTC+2)	Koné 38'	Report	Kabran 56'; Tangen 84'	Stadium: Sarpsborg Stadion; Attendance: 2,000; Referee: Tom Harald Hagen

1 July 2021 10	Vålerenga	4–1	Sarpsborg 08	Oslo
20:00 CEST (UTC+2)	Udahl 43'; Udahl 65'; Borchgrevink 70'; Holm 75'	Report	Näsberg 80' (o.g.)	Stadium: Intility Arena; Attendance: 3,893; Referee: Kristoffer Hagenes

4 July 2021 11	Sarpsborg 08	1–0	Molde	Sarpsborg
18:00 CEST (UTC+2)	Skålevik 74'	Report	Omoijuanfo (yellow card) 67'	Stadium: Sarpsborg Stadion; Attendance: 2,000; Referee: Svein Oddvar Moen

11 July 2021 12	Sandefjord	2–0	Sarpsborg 08	Sandefjord
18:00 CEST (UTC+2)	Jónsson 32'; Normann Hansen 68'	Report		Stadium: Release Arena; Attendance: 2,000; Referee: Christian Moen

17 July 2021 13	Sarpsborg 08	2–2	Bodø/Glimt	Sarpsborg
20:00 CEST (UTC+2)	Salétros 26'; Koné 67'	Report	Botheim 45'; Høibråten 86'	Stadium: Sarpsborg Stadion; Attendance: 2,000; Referee: Sivert Øksnes Amland

21 July 2021 1	Sarpsborg 08	1–1	Mjøndalen	Sarpsborg
19:00 CEST (UTC+2)	Thomassen 90+8'	Report	Solholm Johansen 2'	Stadium: Sarpsborg Stadion; Attendance: 2,000; Referee: Ola Hobber Nilsen

28 July 2021 2	Lillestrøm	2–0	Sarpsborg 08	Lillestrøm
19:00 CEST (UTC+2)	Kairinen 55'; Lehne Olsen 58'	Report		Stadium: Åråsen Stadion; Attendance: 2,000; Referee: Mohammad Usman Aslam

8 August 2021 14	Stabæk	3–1	Sarpsborg 08	Bærum
20:00 CEST (UTC+2)	Wangberg 8'; Edvardsen 45', 56'	Report	Opseth 81'	Stadium: Nadderud Stadion; Attendance: 1,773; Referee: Rohit Saggi

14 August 2021 15	Sarpsborg 08	1–0	Strømsgodset	Sarpsborg
20:00 CEST (UTC+2)	Koné 72'	Report		Stadium: Sarpsborg Stadion; Attendance: 2,526; Referee: Kai Erik Steen

29 August 2021 17	Sarpsborg 08	5–0	Sandefjord	Sarpsborg
18:00 CEST (UTC+2)	Koné 15', 22', 29', 45+6'; Foss 77' (o.g.)	Report		Stadium: Sarpsborg Stadion; Attendance: 2,724; Referee: Rohit Saggi

12 September 2021 18	Haugesund	2–1	Sarpsborg 08	Haugesund
18:00 CEST (UTC+2)	Stølås 47'; Liseth 48'	Report	Koné 83'	Stadium: Haugesund Stadion; Attendance: 2,000; Referee: Tom Harald Hagen

19 September 2021 19	Sarpsborg 08	1–3	Rosenborg	Sarpsborg
18:00 CEST (UTC+2)	Halvorsen 76'	Report	Vecchia 22', 56'; Skjelbred 33'	Stadium: Sarpsborg Stadion; Attendance: 3,409; Referee: Sigurd Smehus Kringstad

25 September 2021 20	Strømsgodset	5–0	Sarpsborg 08	Drammen
18:00 CEST (UTC+2)	Valsvik 26'; Jack 40'; Gulliksen 45+1'; Leifsson 60'; Kadiri 75'	Report		Stadium: Marienlyst Stadion; Attendance: 2,589; Referee: Espen Eskås

2 October 2021 21	Sarpsborg 08	2–1	Lillestrøm	Sarpsborg
18:00 CEST (UTC+2)	Lindseth 28'; Koné 64'	Report	Lehne Olsen 57'	Stadium: Sarpsborg Stadion; Attendance: 4,937; Referee: Marius Hansen Grøtta

17 October 2021 22	Bodø/Glimt	2–1	Sarpsborg 08	Bodø
17:00 CEST (UTC+2)	Botheim 13'; Solbakken 86' (pen.)	Report	Lindseth 81'	Stadium: Aspmyra Stadion; Attendance: 4,417; Referee: Mohammad Usman Aslam

24 October 2021 23	Kristiansund	1–3	Sarpsborg 08	Kristiansund
17:00 CEST (UTC+2)	Strand Nilsen 90+1'	Report	Lindseth 7', 64', 78'	Stadium: Kristiansund Stadion; Attendance: 3,932; Referee: Sigurd Smehus Kringstad

28 October 2021 24	Sarpsborg 08	2–1	Vålerenga	Sarpsborg
20:00 CEST (UTC+2)	Lindseth 81'; Muhammed 90+6'	Report	Kjartansson 69'	Stadium: Sarpsborg Stadion; Attendance: 4,801; Referee: Tom Harald Hagen

31 October 2021 25	Viking	1–2	Sarpsborg 08	Stavanger
18:00 CET (UTC+1)	Stensness 40'	Report	Salétros 35'; Thomassen 59'	Stadium: Viking Stadion; Attendance: 7,508; Referee: Kai Erik Steen

6 November 2021 26	Sarpsborg 08	4–1	Stabæk	Sarpsborg
18:00 CET (UTC+1)	Lindseth 5', 77'; Opseth 75', 86'	Report	Bolly 78'	Stadium: Sarpsborg Stadion; Attendance: 5,409; Referee: Ola Hobber Nilsen

21 November 2021 27	Sarpsborg 08	1–1	Odd	Sarpsborg
17:00 CET (UTC+1)	Salétros 70'	Report	Aas 84'	Stadium: Sarpsborg Stadion; Attendance: 4,037; Referee: Marius Hansen Grøtta

28 November 2021 28	Mjøndalen	1–3	Sarpsborg 08	Mjøndalen
17:00 CET (UTC+1)	Olden Larsen 4'	Report	Koné 2'; Wichne 64'; Opseth 81'	Stadium: Consto Arena; Attendance: 1,500; Referee: Svein Oddvar Moen

5 December 2021 29	Sarpsborg 08	0–1	Tromsø	Sarpsborg
17:00 CET (UTC+1)		Report	Mikkelsen 33'	Stadium: Sarpsborg Stadion; Attendance: 4,411; Referee: Kai Erik Steen

12 December 2021 30	Brann	2–1	Sarpsborg 08	Bergen
17:00 CET (UTC+1)	Heggebø 59'; Wolfe 66'	Report	Čanađija 90'	Stadium: Brann Stadion; Attendance: 10,527; Referee: Ola Hobber Nilsen

==== Table ====
Pos	Team	Pld	W	D	L	GF	GA	GD	Pts
6	Kristiansund	30	14	4	12	41	46	−5	46
7	Vålerenga	30	11	12	7	46	37	+9	45
8	Sarpsborg 08	30	11	6	13	39	44	−5	39
9	Strømsgodset	30	9	9	12	43	43	0	36
10	Sandefjord	30	10	6	14	38	52	−14	36

Source: Football Association of Norway (in Norwegian)
Rules for classification: 1) Points; 2) Goal difference; 3) Goals scored; 4) Head-to-head points; 5) Head-to-head goal difference; 6) Head-to-head away goals scored (only if between two teams); 7) Head-to-head goals scored; 8) Play-off (only used to decide champions or relegation).

=== Norwegian Football Cup ===
25 July 2021 First round	Kvik Halden	0–2	Sarpsborg 08	Halden
18:00 CEST (UTC+2)		Report	D. Mehmeti 45' (o.g.); Skålevik 90+5'	Stadium: Halden Stadion; Attendance: 671; Referee: Abdulhadi Al-Fahad

1 August 2021 Second round	Nordstrand	0–3	Sarpsborg 08	Oslo
18:00 CEST (UTC+2)		Report	Dyrestam 34'; Opseth 47'; Salétros 67'	Stadium: Nordstrand Kunstgress; Attendance: 563; Referee: Jørgen Haugen

22 September 2021 Third round	Øygarden	0–5	Sarpsborg 08	Ågotnes, Øygarden
18:00 CEST (UTC+2)		Report	Salétros 1'; Opseth 24', 37', 56'; Halvorsen 59'	Stadium: Ågotnes Stadion; Attendance: 300; Referee: Steinar Hauge

Fourth round took place during the 2022 season.
