= 2020 Sarpsborg 08 FF season =

Sarpsborg 08
2020 season
- President: Hans Petter Arnesen
- Manager: Mikael Stahre
- Stadium: Sarpsborg Stadion
- Eliteserien: 12th
- Norwegian Cup: Canceled due to the COVID-19 pandemic
- Top goalscorer: League: Mustafa Abdellaoue (6); All: Mustafa Abdellaoue (6)
Home colours	Away colours

The 2020 season was Sarpsborg 08's 9th season in Eliteserien, following their return to the top level in 2012.

== Season events ==
On 12 June, the Norwegian Football Federation announced that a maximum of 200 home fans would be allowed to attend the upcoming seasons matches.

On 10 September, the Norwegian Football Federation cancelled the 2020 Norwegian Cup due to the COVID-19 pandemic in Norway.

On 30 September, the Minister of Culture and Gender Equality, Abid Raja, announced that clubs would be able to have crowds of 600 at games from 12 October.

== Squad ==
Note: Flags indicate national team as defined under FIFA eligibility rules; some limited exceptions apply. Players may hold more than one non-FIFA nationality.

No.	Pos.	Nation	Player
1	GK	NOR	Simen Nilsen
2	DF	GAM	Sulayman Bojang
3	DF	NOR	Jørgen Horn
4	DF	NOR	Bjørn Utvik
5	DF	NOR	Magnar Ødegaard
6	DF	NOR	Nicolai Næss
7	MF	NOR	Ole Halvorsen
8	MF	NOR	Mohamed Ofkir
10	FW	SWE	Guillermo Molins
11	MF	NOR	Jonathan Lindseth
12	GK	CAN	Simon Thomas
14	MF	NOR	Tobias Heintz (on loan from Kasımpaşa)
15	MF	NOR	Gaute Vetti
16	DF	NOR	Joachim Thomassen

No.	Pos.	Nation	Player
17	MF	NOR	Joachim Soltvedt
18	MF	NOR	Sebastian Jarl
20	MF	SWE	Anton Salétros
21	MF	BEN	Jordan Adéoti
22	DF	GUI	Mikael Dyrestam
23	DF	BIH	Emir Derviskadic
24	MF	NOR	Anwar Elyounoussi
25	FW	NOR	Johan Olstad
27	FW	MLI	Aboubacar Konté
28	FW	NOR	Alexander Tveter
30	FW	NOR	Mustafa Abdellaoue
33	GK	MKD	David Nilsson
70	MF	EGY	Alexander Jakobsen

=== Out on loan ===
Note: Flags indicate national team as defined under FIFA eligibility rules; some limited exceptions apply. Players may hold more than one non-FIFA nationality.

No.	Pos.	Nation	Player
10	FW	NOR	Steffen Skålevik (at Start until 31 December 2020)

== Transfers ==
=== In ===
Date	Position	Nationality	Name	From	Fee	Ref.
10 January 2020	MF	(Norway)	Mohamed Ofkir	Sandefjord	Undisclosed	
14 January 2020	MF	(Norway)	Joachim Soltvedt	Sogndal	Undisclosed	
29 January 2020	GK	(North Macedonia)	David Nilsson	GIF Sundsvall	Undisclosed	
20 February 2020	MF	(Egypt)	Alexander Jakobsen	IFK Norrköping	Undisclosed	
29 July 2020	DF	(Guinea)	Mikael Dyrestam	Xanthi	Undisclosed	
6 August 2020	MF	(Benin)	Jordan Adéoti	Auxerre	Undisclosed	
10 September 2020	GK	(Canada)	Simon Thomas	KFUM Oslo	Undisclosed	
16 September 2020	FW	(Sweden)	Guillermo Molins	Malmö	Undisclosed	
5 October 2020	MF	(Sweden)	Anton Salétros	Rostov	Free	

=== Loans in ===
Date from	Position	Nationality	Name	to	Date to	Ref.
14 February 2020	MF	(Sweden)	Anton Salétros	Rostov	29 July 2020	
26 August 2020	MF	(Norway)	Tobias Heintz	Kasımpaşa	End of Season	

=== Out ===
Date	Position	Nationality	Name	To	Fee	Ref.
3 February 2020	DF	(Norway)	Jon-Helge Tveita	Brann	Undisclosed	
9 June 2020	MF	(Costa Rica)	Wílmer Azofeifa	San Carlos	Undisclosed	
9 September 2020	MF	(Mali)	Ismaila Coulibaly	Sheffield United	Undisclosed	
9 September 2020	FW	(Norway)	Jørgen Larsen	Groningen	Undisclosed	
10 September 2020	GK	(Norway)	Aslak Falch	Sandnes Ulf	Undisclosed	
21 September 2020	DF	(Norway)	Sigurd Kvile	Åsane	Undisclosed	

=== Loans out ===
Date from	Position	Nationality	Name	to	Date to	Ref.
9 December 2019	DF	(Costa Rica)	Pablo Arboine	A.D. San Carlos	End of season	
6 June 2020	FW	(Norway)	Steffen Skålevik	Start	End of season	

=== Released ===
Date	Position	Nationality	Name	Joined	Date
20 December 2019	DF	(Norway)	Niklas Gunnarsson	Strømsgodset	3 February 2020
31 December 2019	GK	(Norway)	Sander Thulin		
31 December 2019	DF	(Netherlands)	Bart Straalman	Rodez AF	
31 December 2019	MF	(Denmark)	Matti Lund Nielsen	Reggina	7 January 2020
31 December 2019	MF	(Ethiopia)	Amin Askar	Kristiansund	1 January 2020
31 December 2019	MF	(France)	Lenny Nangis	R.W.D. Molenbeek	15 July 2020
31 December 2019	MF	(Norway)	Kristoffer Larsen	Åsane	
31 December 2019	MF	(Norway)	Kristoffer Zachariassen	Rosenborg	1 January 2020
31 December 2019	FW	(Northern Ireland)	Kyle Lafferty	Sunderland	10 January 2020

== Competitions ==
=== Eliteserien ===
==== Results summary ====
Overall								Home						Away					
Pld	W	D	L	GF	GA	GD	Pts	W	D	L	GF	GA	GD	W	D	L	GF	GA	GD
30	8	8	14	33	43	−10	32	6	3	6	20	14	+6	2	5	8	13	29	−16

Last updated: 19 December 2020.
Source: Results

==== Results by round ====
Round	1	2	3	4	5	6	7	8	9	10	11	12	13	14	15	16	17	18	19	20	21	22	23	24	25	26	27	28	29	30
Ground	H	A	H	A	H	A	H	A	H	A	H	H	A	H	A	H	A	H	A	H	A	H	A	A	H	A	H	A	H	A
Result	L	L	L	L	L	W	W	D	W	L	D	W	L	W	L	L	W	W	D	W	L	L	D	L	L	D	D	D	D	L
Position	14	13	16	16	16	14	12	12	10	12	11	11	12	10	11	12	11	8	9	8	9	10	9	10	10	11	12	12	12	12

Updated to match(es) played on 22 December 2020. Source: Results
A = Away; H = Home; W = Win; D = Draw; L = Loss

==== Results ====
16 June 2020 1	Sarpsborg 08	0–1	Vålerenga	Sarpsborg
20:30 CEST (UTC+2)	Bojang (yellow card) 43'; Salétros (yellow card) 61'; Halvorsen (yellow card) 83'	Report	Borchgrevink (yellow card) 12'; Dønnum (yellow card) 16' (goal) 41'; Shala (yellow card) 60'; Jensen (yellow card) 67'; Klaesson (yellow card) 90+5'	Stadium: Sarpsborg Stadion; Attendance: 200; Referee: Tom Harald Hagen

20 June 2020 2	Mjøndalen	1–0	Sarpsborg 08	Mjøndalen
18:00 CEST (UTC+2)	Aasmundsen (yellow card) 16'; Ibrahim 25'	Report	Bojang (yellow card) 90+1'	Stadium: Consto Arena; Attendance: 200; Referee: Sigurd Smehus Kringstad

25 June 2020 3	Sarpsborg 08	2–3	Strømsgodset	Sarpsborg
18:00 CEST (UTC+2)	Halvorsen (penalty missed) 11'; Utvik (yellow card) 33'; Abdellaoue 52', 79' (pen.); Jakobsen (yellow card) 74'	Report	Maigaard 30' (pen.), 33' (pen.); Hove 54'; Gunnarsson (yellow card) 57'; Leifsson (yellow card) 65'; Mølvadgaard (yellow card) 90+1'	Stadium: Sarpsborg Stadion; Attendance: 200; Referee: Ola Hobber Nilsen

28 June 2020 4	Bodø/Glimt	2–1	Sarpsborg 08	Bodø
18:00 CEST (UTC+2)	J.Hauge 32'; Saltnes 58'	Report	Bojang (yellow card) 15'; Halvorsen 54'; Ødegaard (yellow card) 90+3'	Stadium: Aspmyra Stadion; Attendance: 200; Referee: Mohammad Aslam

2 July 2020 5	Sarpsborg 08	0–1	Brann	Sarpsborg
20:30 CEST (UTC+2)	Larsen (yellow card) 50'	Report	Koomson 42'; Kolskogen (yellow card) 50'	Stadium: Sarpsborg Stadion; Attendance: 200; Referee: Svein Oddvar Moen

5 July 2020 6	Sandefjord	0–3	Sarpsborg 08	Sandefjord
18:00 CEST (UTC+2)	Jónsson (yellow card) 81'; Johansen (yellow card) 83'	Report	Coulibaly 15' (yellow card) 67'; Utvik (yellow card) 18'; Larsen 29'; Bojang (yellow card) 40'; Soltvedt 80'	Stadium: Sandefjord Arena; Attendance: 200; Referee: Kai Erik Steen

12 July 2020 7	Sarpsborg 08	1–0	Start	Sarpsborg
18:00 CEST (UTC+2)	Lindseth 8'; Thomassen (yellow card) 37'; Coulibaly (yellow card) 45'; Larsen (yellow card) 78'	Report	Schulze (yellow card) 41'	Stadium: Sarpsborg Stadion; Attendance: 200; Referee: Sivert Amland

16 July 2020 8	Stabæk	1–1	Sarpsborg 08	Bærum
18:00 CEST (UTC+2)	Hanche-Olsen (yellow card) 39'; Vetlesen 43'; Kinoshita (yellow card) 90+2'	Report	Soltvedt 47'; Lindseth (yellow card) 64'	Stadium: Nadderud Stadion; Attendance: 200; Referee: Tore Hansen

19 July 2020 9	Sarpsborg 08	2–0	Odd	Sarpsborg
18:00 CEST (UTC+2)	Coulibaly 61'; Lindseth (yellow card) 77'; Ofkir 87'	Report	Ruud (yellow card) 90+4'	Stadium: Sarpsborg Stadion; Attendance: 200; Referee: Espen Eskås

26 July 2020 10	Viking	3–0	Sarpsborg 08	Stavanger
18:00 CEST (UTC+2)	Løkberg 3'; Berisha (penalty missed) 34'; Pereira 36', 46'	Report	Utvik (yellow card) 23'; Coulibaly (yellow card) 44'; Jakobsen (yellow card) 83'; Konté (yellow card) 86'	Stadium: Viking Stadion; Attendance: 200; Referee: Sivert Amland

29 July 2020 11	Sarpsborg 08	0–0	Haugesund	Sarpsborg
18:00 CEST (UTC+2)	Thomassen (yellow card) 43'	Report	Wadji (yellow card) 38'; Hansen (yellow card) 52'	Stadium: Sarpsborg Stadion; Attendance: 200; Referee: Usman Aslam

2 August 2020 12	Sarpsborg 08	4–0	Aalesund	Sarpsborg
18:00 CEST (UTC+2)	Coulibaly 48'; Abdellaoue 52' (pen.), 63' (penalty missed) 59'; Soltvedt 90+2'	Report	Bizoza (yellow card) 62'	Stadium: Sarpsborg Stadion; Attendance: 200; Referee: Tom Harald Hagen

9 August 2020 13	Rosenborg	5–1	Sarpsborg 08	Trondheim
20:30 CEST (UTC+2)	Åsen 4'; Holse 62', 68'; Zachariassen 79'; Islamović 90'	Report	Utvik (yellow card) 20'; Coulibaly 26'	Stadium: Lerkendal Stadion; Attendance: 200; Referee: Tore Hansen

15 August 2020 14	Sarpsborg 08	2–1	Molde	Sarpsborg
16:00 CEST (UTC+2)	Abdellaoue 31' (pen.); J.Larsen (yellow card) 44'; Halvorsen 56'	Report	Hussain (yellow card) 31'; Aursnes (yellow card) 32'; Andersen 59'	Stadium: Sarpsborg Stadion; Attendance: 200; Referee: Ola Hobber Nilsen

22 August 2020 15	Kristiansund	4–1	Sarpsborg 08	Kristiansund
18:00 CEST (UTC+2)	Pellegrino 52' (pen.), 62'; Kalludra 59'; Askar (yellow card) 77'; Hopmark (yellow card) 90+1'; Sivertsen 90+4'	Report	Falch (yellow card) 52'; Konté (yellow card) 76'; Larsen 90'	Stadium: Kristiansund Stadion; Attendance: 200; Referee: Ola Hobber Nilsen

30 August 2020 16	Sarpsborg 08	0–3	Bodø/Glimt	Sarpsborg
18:00 CEST (UTC+2)	Næss (yellow card) 33'; Lindseth (yellow card) 71'; Coulibaly (yellow card) 88'	Report	Zinckernagel 44', 76'; J.Hauge 70' (pen.)	Stadium: Sarpsborg Stadion; Attendance: 200; Referee: Espen Eskås

13 September 2020 17	Aalesund	0–1	Sarpsborg 08	Ålesund
18:00 CEST (UTC+2)	Castro (yellow card) 45+2'	Report	Heintz 48'; Utvik (yellow card) 81'; Nilsson (yellow card) 86'	Stadium: Color Line Stadion; Attendance: 200; Referee: Tommy Skjerven

19 September 2020 18	Sarpsborg 08	2–0	Mjøndalen	Sarpsborg
20:30 CEST (UTC+2)	Abdellaoue 5' (pen.); Heintz (yellow card) 33'; Halvorsen (yellow card) 36' (goal) 42'; Adéoti (yellow card) 82'	Report		Stadium: Sarpsborg Stadion; Attendance: 200; Referee: Dag Vidar Hafsås

26 September 2020 19	Strømsgodset	0–0	Sarpsborg 08	Drammen
20:30 CEST (UTC+2)	Jack (yellow card) 45'	Report	Dyrestam (yellow card) 49'	Stadium: Marienlyst Stadion; Attendance: 200; Referee: Kristoffer Hagenes

3 October 2020 20	Sarpsborg 08	4–0	Stabæk	Sarpsborg
18:00 CEST (UTC+2)	Dyrestam 12'; Heintz 17'; Lindseth 23'; Utvik 26'	Report	Amankwah (yellow card) 53'; Vogt (yellow card) 63'; Kostadinov (yellow card) 87'	Stadium: Sarpsborg Stadion; Attendance: 200; Referee: Marius Hansen Grøtta

18 October 2020 21	Haugesund	2–0	Sarpsborg 08	Haugesund
18:00 CEST (UTC+2)	Stølås (yellow card) 34'; Vetti 44' (o.g.); Velde 47'; Desler (yellow card) 78'	Report	Utvik (yellow card) 23'; Thomassen (yellow card) 43'; Molins (yellow card) 51'; Horn (yellow card) 79'	Stadium: Haugesund Stadion; Attendance: 600; Referee: Mohammad Usman Aslam

25 October 2020 22	Sarpsborg 08	1–2	Rosenborg	Sarpsborg
18:00 CET (UTC+1)	Halvorsen (yellow card) 12'; Lindseth 70'	Report	Hedenstad (yellow card) 8'; Islamović 13' (pen.); Konate 24'; Reginiussen (yellow card) 58'; Dahl Reitan (yellow card) 88'	Stadium: Sarpsborg Stadion; Attendance: 600; Referee: Rohit Saggi

31 October 2020 23	Odd	1–1	Sarpsborg 08	Skien
18:00 CET (UTC+1)	Ruud 50' (pen.)	Report	Thomassen (yellow card) 32'; Ødegaard (yellow card) 49'; Salétros (yellow card) 57'; Dyrestam 65'	Stadium: Skagerak Arena; Attendance: 600; Referee: Dag Vidar Hafsås

8 November 2020 24	Start	3–2	Sarpsborg 08	Kristiansand
18:00 CET (UTC+1)	Segberg 36'; Utvik 47' (o.g.); Ugland (yellow card) 85'; Bolaños (penalty missed) 87'; Kabran 89'; Deumeland (yellow card) 90+3'	Report	Salétros 21'; Halvorsen 45+3' (pen.); Dyrestam (yellow card) 65'	Stadium: Sør Arena; Attendance: 600; Referee: Espen Eskås

22 November 2020 25	Sarpsborg 08	1–2	Viking	Sarpsborg
18:00 CET (UTC+1)	Utvik 54'; Salétros (yellow card) 58'	Report	Løkberg (yellow card) 56'; Ibrahimaj 60', 72' (yellow card) 90+6'; Vikstøl (yellow card) 80'	Stadium: Sarpsborg Stadion; Attendance: 600; Referee: Mohammad Usman Aslam

29 November 2020 26	Vålerenga	1–1	Sarpsborg 08	Oslo
20:00 CET (UTC+1)	Näsberg 90+6'	Report	Halvorsen 19'; Ofkir (yellow card) 90+2'	Stadium: Intility Arena; Attendance: 200; Referee: Tore Hansen

2 December 2020 27	Sarpsborg 08	1–1	Kristiansund	Sarpsborg
18:00 CET (UTC+1)	Adéoti (yellow card) 11'; Dyrestam (yellow card) 34' (yellow-red card) 41'; Jarl 85'; Soltvedt (yellow card) 90'; Thomassen (yellow card) 90'	Report	Skarsem 21' (yellow card) 43'	Stadium: Sarpsborg Stadion; Attendance: 600; Referee: Ola Hobber Nilsen

6 December 2020 28	Brann	1–1	Sarpsborg 08	Bergen
17:00 CET (UTC+1)	Barmen 75'; Fjóluson (yellow card) 85'	Report	Utvik (yellow card) 7'; Vetti 52'; Jarl (yellow card) 64'; Halvorsen (yellow card) 66'	Stadium: Brann Stadion; Attendance: 600; Referee: Dag Vidar Hafsås

9 December 2020 29	Sarpsborg 08	0–0	Sandefjord	Sarpsborg
18:00 CET (UTC+1)	Halvorsen (yellow card) 10' (yellow-red card) 56'	Report	Rufo (yellow card) 8'; Wembangomo (yellow card) 20'; Kralj (yellow card) 35'; Vega (yellow card) 37'; Haakenstad (yellow card) 79'; Hansen (yellow card) 88'	Stadium: Sarpsborg Stadion; Attendance: 600; Referee: Kristoffer Hagenes

19 December 2020 30	Molde	5–0	Sarpsborg 08	Molde
15:30 CET (UTC+1)	James 25' (pen.); Moström 27'; Omoijuanfo 38', 56'; Ellingsen 88'	Report	Heintz (yellow card) 25'; Adéoti (yellow card) 90+1'	Stadium: Aker Stadion; Attendance: 600; Referee: Tore Hansen

==== Table ====
Pos	Team	Pld	W	D	L	GF	GA	GD	Pts	Qualification or relegation
10	Brann	30	9	9	12	40	49	−9	36	
11	Sandefjord	30	9	8	13	31	43	−12	35	
12	Sarpsborg 08	30	8	8	14	33	43	−10	32	
13	Strømsgodset	30	7	10	13	41	57	−16	31	
14	Mjøndalen (O)	30	8	3	19	26	45	−19	27	Qualification for the relegation play-offs

Source: Football Association of Norway (in Norwegian)
Rules for classification: 1) Points; 2) Goal difference; 3) Goals scored; 4) Head-to-head points; 5) Head-to-head goal difference; 6) Head-to-head away goals scored (only if between two teams); 7) Head-to-head goals scored; 8) Play-off (only used to decide champions or relegation).
(O) Play-off winners

=== Norwegian Cup ===
2020 First round	–
CEST (UTC+2)
Note: Cup cancelled on 10 September due to the COVID-19 pandemic in Norway.

== Squad statistics ==
As of match played 19 December 2020

=== Appearances and goals ===
No.	Pos	Nat	Player	Total		Eliteserien		Norwegian Cup	
No.	Pos	Nat	Player	Apps	Goals	Apps	Goals	Apps	Goals
2	DF	(The Gambia) GAM	Sulayman Bojang	24	0	11+13	0	0	0
3	DF	(Norway) NOR	Jørgen Horn	10	0	8+2	0	0	0
4	DF	(Norway) NOR	Bjørn Utvik	28	2	27+1	2	0	0
5	DF	(Norway) NOR	Magnar Ødegaard	29	0	28+1	0	0	0
6	DF	(Norway) NOR	Nicolai Næss	29	0	29	0	0	0
7	MF	(Norway) NOR	Ole Halvorsen	27	5	25+2	5	0	0
8	MF	(Norway) NOR	Mohamed Ofkir	25	1	10+15	1	0	0
10	FW	(Sweden) SWE	Guillermo Molins	5	0	4+1	0	0	0
11	MF	(Norway) NOR	Jonathan Lindseth	26	3	23+3	3	0	0
12	GK	(Canada) CAN	Simon Thomas	1	0	1	0	0	0
14	MF	(Norway) NOR	Tobias Heintz	14	2	14	2	0	0
15	MF	(Norway) NOR	Gaute Vetti	15	1	10+5	1	0	0
16	DF	(Norway) NOR	Joachim Thomassen	24	0	24	0	0	0
17	MF	(Norway) NOR	Joachim Soltvedt	24	3	12+12	3	0	0
18	MF	(Norway) NOR	Sebastian Jarl	13	1	3+10	1	0	0
20	MF	(Sweden) SWE	Anton Salétros	19	1	17+2	1	0	0
21	MF	(Benin) BEN	Jordan Adéoti	13	0	4+9	0	0	0
22	DF	(Guinea) GUI	Mikael Dyrestam	14	2	13+1	2	0	0
23	MF	(Bosnia and Herzegovina) BIH	Emir Derviskadic	1	0	0+1	0	0	0
24	MF	(Norway) NOR	Anwar Elyounoussi	2	0	0+2	0	0	0
27	FW	(Mali) MLI	Aboubacar Konté	7	0	1+6	0	0	0
28	FW	(Norway) NOR	Alexander Tveter	12	0	2+10	0	0	0
30	FW	(Norway) NOR	Mustafa Abdellaoue	17	6	8+9	6	0	0
33	GK	(North Macedonia) MKD	David Nilsson	26	0	26	0	0	0
70	MF	(Egypt) EGY	Alexander Jakobsen	10	0	1+9	0	0	0
Players away from Sarpsborg 08 on loan:
Players who left Sarpsborg 08 during the season
10	FW	(Norway) NOR	Jørgen Larsen	16	2	15+1	2	0	0
26	MF	(Mali) MLI	Ismaila Coulibaly	14	4	11+3	4	0	0
31	GK	(Norway) NOR	Aslak Falch	3	0	3	0	0	0

=== Goal scorers ===
Place	Position	Nation	Number	Name	Eliteserien	Norwegian Cup	Total
1	FW	(Norway)	30	Mustafa Abdellaoue	6	0	6
2	MF	(Norway)	7	Ole Halvorsen	5	0	5
3	MF	(Mali)	26	Ismaila Coulibaly	4	0	4
4	MF	(Norway)	17	Joachim Soltvedt	3	0	3
4	MF	(Norway)	11	Jonathan Lindseth	3	0	3
6	FW	(Norway)	10	Jørgen Larsen	2	0	2
6	MF	(Norway)	14	Tobias Heintz	2	0	2
6	DF	(Guinea)	22	Mikael Dyrestam	2	0	2
6	DF	(Norway)	4	Bjørn Utvik	2	0	2
10	MF	(Norway)	8	Mohamed Ofkir	1	0	1
10	MF	(Sweden)	20	Anton Salétros	1	0	1
10	MF	(Norway)	18	Sebastian Jarl	1	0	1
10	MF	(Norway)	15	Gaute Vetti	1	0	1
				TOTALS	33	0	33

=== Clean sheets ===
Place	Position	Nation	Number	Name	Eliteserien	Norwegian Cup	Total
1	GK	(North Macedonia)	33	David Nilsson	10	0	10
				TOTALS	10	0	10

=== Disciplinary record ===
Number	Nation	Position	Name	Eliteserien		Norwegian Cup		Total	
Number	Nation	Position	Name	Booked	Sent off (straight red)	Booked	Sent off (straight red)	Booked	Sent off (straight red)
2	(The Gambia)	DF	Sulayman Bojang	4	0	0	0	4	0
3	(Norway)	DF	Jørgen Horn	1	0	0	0	1	0
4	(Norway)	DF	Bjørn Utvik	7	0	0	0	7	0
5	(Norway)	DF	Magnar Ødegaard	2	0	0	0	2	0
6	(Norway)	DF	Nicolai Næss	1	0	0	0	1	0
7	(Norway)	MF	Ole Halvorsen	6	1	0	0	6	1
8	(Norway)	MF	Mohamed Ofkir	1	0	0	0	1	0
10	(Sweden)	FW	Guillermo Molins	1	0	0	0	1	0
11	(Norway)	MF	Jonathan Lindseth	3	0	0	0	3	0
14	(Norway)	MF	Tobias Heintz	2	0	0	0	2	0
16	(Norway)	DF	Joachim Thomassen	5	0	0	0	5	0
17	(Norway)	MF	Joachim Soltvedt	1	0	0	0	1	0
18	(Norway)	MF	Sebastian Jarl	1	0	0	0	1	0
20	(Sweden)	MF	Anton Salétros	3	0	0	0	3	0
21	(Benin)	MF	Jordan Adéoti	3	0	0	0	3	0
22	(Guinea)	DF	Mikael Dyrestam	4	1	0	0	4	1
27	(Mali)	FW	Aboubacar Konté	2	0	0	0	2	0
33	(North Macedonia)	GK	David Nilsson	1	0	0	0	1	0
70	(Egypt)	MF	Alexander Jakobsen	2	0	0	0	2	0
Players who left Sarpsborg 08 during the season:
10	(Norway)	FW	Jørgen Larsen	3	0	0	0	3	0
26	(Mali)	MF	Ismaila Coulibaly	4	0	0	0	4	0
31	(Norway)	GK	Aslak Falch	1	0	0	0	1	0
			TOTALS	52	2	0	0	52	2
