= 2019 Sarpsborg 08 FF season =

Sarpsborg 08
2019 season
- Chairman: Hans Petter Arnesen
- Manager: Geir Bakke
- Stadium: Sarpsborg Stadion
- Eliteserien: 12th
- Norwegian Cup: Third round vs Tromsdalen
- Top goalscorer: League: Kristoffer Zachariassen (6); All: Kristoffer Zachariassen (6)
Home colours	Away colours	Third colours

The 2019 season was Sarpsborg 08's eighth season in Eliteserien, following their return to the top level in 2012.

== Squad ==
As of 23 July 2019

Note: Flags indicate national team as defined under FIFA eligibility rules; some limited exceptions apply. Players may hold more than one non-FIFA nationality.

No.	Pos.	Nation	Player
2	DF	NED	Bart Straalman
3	DF	NOR	Jørgen Horn
4	DF	NOR	Bjørn Inge Utvik
5	DF	NOR	Niklas Gunnarsson
6	DF	NOR	Nicolai Næss
7	MF	NOR	Ole Jørgen Halvorsen
8	MF	DEN	Matti Lund Nielsen
10	FW	NOR	Steffen Lie Skålevik
11	MF	NOR	Jonathan Lindseth
13	DF	AUT	Mario Pavelić (on loan from Rijeka)
15	MF	NOR	Gaute Høberg Vetti
16	DF	NOR	Joachim Thomassen
17	MF	NOR	Kristoffer Zachariassen
18	MF	NOR	Sebastian Jarl
19	FW	NOR	Kristoffer Larsen

No.	Pos.	Nation	Player
20	DF	NOR	Magnar Ødegaard
21	FW	NOR	Mustafa Abdellaoue
22	MF	NOR	Jon-Helge Tveita
23	MF	GLP	Lenny Nangis
25	FW	NOR	Johan Meldalen Olstad
26	MF	MLI	Ismaila Coulibaly
27	FW	MLI	Aboubacar Konté
28	FW	NOR	Alexander Ruud Tveter
30	GK	FRA	Alexandre Letellier (on loan from Angers)
31	GK	NOR	Aslak Falch
44	MF	CRO	Mate Maleš
45	FW	NOR	Jørgen Strand Larsen
48	FW	NIR	Kyle Lafferty
77	DF	ETH	Amin Askar

=== Out on loan ===
Note: Flags indicate national team as defined under FIFA eligibility rules; some limited exceptions apply. Players may hold more than one non-FIFA nationality.

No.	Pos.	Nation	Player
1	GK	NOR	Sander Thulin (to Kråkerøy)
14	MF	CRC	Wilmer Azofeifa (to Aalesund)
24	MF	NOR	Anwar Elyounoussi (to Fram Larvik)
—	DF	GAM	Sulayman Bojang (to Kongsvinger)

== Transfers ==
=== In ===
Date	Position	Nationality	Name	From	Fee	Ref.
6 August 2018†	MF	(Norway)	Jonathan Lindseth	Mjøndalen	Undisclosed	
30 November 2018†	DF	(Norway)	Nicolai Næss	Heerenveen	Undisclosed	
13 January 2019	MF	(Costa Rica)	Wílmer Azofeifa	Santos	Undisclosed	
14 January 2019	MF	(Mali)	Ismaila Coulibaly	Duguwolofila	Undisclosed	
21 January 2019	FW	(Norway)	Steffen Lie Skålevik	Brann	Undisclosed	
31 January 2019	DF	(Norway)	Isak Heen Berge	Follo	Undisclosed	
31 January 2019	MF	(Norway)	Sebastian Jarl	Kjelsås	Undisclosed	
14 February 2019	DF	(Trinidad and Tobago)	Sheldon Bateau	Krylia Sovetov Samara	Undisclosed	
15 February 2019	FW	(Norway)	Lars-Jørgen Salvesen	Ull/Kisa	Undisclosed	
22 February 2019	DF	(Costa Rica)	Pablo Arboine	Santos	Undisclosed	
11 March 2019	FW	(Mali)	Aboubacar Konté	Etoiles Mandé	Undisclosed	
11 July 2019	DF	(Netherlands)	Bart Straalman		Free	
18 July 2019	DF	(Norway)	Magnar Ødegaard	AIK	Free	
27 July 2019	MF	(Guadeloupe)	Lenny Nangis	Levadiakos	Free	
30 July 2019	MF	(Croatia)	Mate Maleš	CFR Cluj	Free	
16 August 2019	FW	(Norway)	Mustafa Abdellaoue	Strømsgodset	Undisclosed	
27 August 2019	FW	(Northern Ireland)	Kyle Lafferty	Rangers	Free	
2 September 2019	DF	(Norway)	Niklas Gunnarsson	Palermo	Undisclosed	

† Transfers announced on the above dates and finalised on 1 January 2019.

=== Loans in ===
Date from	Position	Nationality	Name	From	Date to	Ref.
19 July 2019	GK	(France)	Alexandre Letellier	Angers SCO	End of Season	
31 July 2019	DF	(Austria)	Mario Pavelić	HNK Rijeka	End of Season	

=== Out ===
Date	Position	Nationality	Name	To	Fee	Ref.
Winter 2019	DF	(Iceland)	Orri Sigurður Ómarsson	Valur	Undisclosed	
Winter 2019	DF	(Norway)	Joackim Jørgensen	IK Start	Undisclosed	
Winter 2019	MF	(Norway)	Tobias Heintz	Kasımpaşa	Undisclosed	
Winter 2019	MF	(Nigeria)	Mohammed Usman	Pyunik	Undisclosed	
Winter 2019	FW	(France)	Rashad Muhammed	BB Erzurumspor	Undisclosed	
12 January 2019	FW	(Denmark)	Patrick Mortensen	AGF Aarhus	Undisclosed	
31 January 2019	FW	(Denmark)	Mikkel Agger	Viborg	Undisclosed	
17 July 2019	DF	(Trinidad and Tobago)	Sheldon Bateau	KV Mechelen	Undisclosed	
23 July 2019	GK	(Russia)	Aleksandr Vasyutin	Zenit St.Petersburg	Undisclosed	
16 August 2019	FW	(Norway)	Lars-Jørgen Salvesen	Strømsgodset	Undisclosed	

=== Loans out ===
Date from	Position	Nationality	Name	To	Date to	Ref.
Summer 2019	DF	(The Gambia)	Sulayman Bojang	Kongsvinger	End of Season	
9 August 2019	MF	(Costa Rica)	Wílmer Azofeifa	Aalesund	End of Season	
12 August 2019	DF	(Costa Rica)	Pablo Arboine	HB Køge	End of Season	
Summer 2019	MF	(Norway)	Anwar Elyounoussi	Fram Larvik	End of Season	

== Competitions ==
=== Eliteserien ===
==== Results summary ====
Overall								Home						Away					
Pld	W	D	L	GF	GA	GD	Pts	W	D	L	GF	GA	GD	W	D	L	GF	GA	GD
30	5	15	10	30	40	−10	30	4	9	2	18	16	+2	1	6	8	12	24	−12

Last updated: 1 December 2019.
Source: see below

==== Results by round ====
Round	1	2	3	4	5	6	7	8	9	10	11	12	13	14	15	16	17	18	19	20	21	22	23	24	25	26	27	28	29	30
Ground	H	A	H	A	H	A	H	A	H	H	A	H	A	A	A	H	A	H	A	H	H	A	H	A	H	A	H	A	H	A
Result	D	D	W	D	D	L	L	L	L	W	D	D	L	D	L	D	L	D	L	D	W	L	D	W	D	D	W	L	D	D
Position	7	10	5	7	7	10	11	11	15	15	12	13	13	15	15	15	15	15	16	16	14	16	16	13	13	13	12	13	11	12

Updated to match(es) played on 1 December 2019. Source: see below
A = Away; H = Home; W = Win; D = Draw; L = Loss

==== Results ====
31 March 2019 1	Sarpsborg 08	1–1	Molde	Sarpsborg
18:00 CEST (UTC+2)	Halvorsen (yellow card) 10'; Lindseth 68'	Report	Ellingsen (yellow card) 13'; Moström (yellow card) 87'; Eikrem 90'	Stadium: Sarpsborg Stadion; Attendance: 5,964; Referee: Tore Hansen

7 April 2019 2	Haugesund	1–1	Sarpsborg 08	Haugesund
18:00 CEST (UTC+2)	Vasyutin 28' (o.g.); Hansen (yellow card) 85'	Report	Zachariassen 47' (yellow card) 79'	Stadium: Haugesund Stadion; Attendance: 3,671; Referee: Sigurd Smehus Kringstad

14 April 2019 3	Sarpsborg 08	1–0	Lillestrøm	Sarpsborg
18:00 CEST (UTC+2)	J.Larsen 11' (yellow card) 89'; Skålevik (yellow card) 34'; Thomassen (yellow card) 85'	Report	Kippe (yellow card) 29'; Rafn (yellow card) 42'	Stadium: Sarpsborg Stadion; Attendance: 5,567; Referee: Espen Eskås

22 April 2019 4	Bodø/Glimt	1–1	Sarpsborg 08	Bodø
18:00 CEST (UTC+2)	Bjørkan 5'; Moberg (yellow card) 81'; Lode (yellow card) 88'	Report	Nielsen (yellow card) 4'; Salvesen 85'	Stadium: Aspmyra Stadion; Attendance: 3,663; Referee: Tommy Skjerven

27 April 2019 5	Sarpsborg 08	1–1	Mjøndalen	Sarpsborg
18:00 CEST (UTC+2)	Halvorsen (yellow card) 23'; Lindseth (yellow card) 30'; Næss 55'; Horn (yellow card) 79'	Report	Brochmann (yellow card) 10'; Gauseth 17'; Solberg (yellow card) 45'	Stadium: Sarpsborg Stadion; Attendance: 5,451; Referee: Tom Harald Hagen

5 May 2019 6	Rosenborg	1–0	Sarpsborg 08	Trondheim
20:00 CEST (UTC+2)	Trondsen (yellow card) 29'; Jensen 39'	Report	Halvorsen (yellow card) 29'	Stadium: Lerkendal Stadion; Attendance: 10,040; Referee: Svein Oddvar Moen

12 May 2019 7	Sarpsborg 08	0–1	Kristiansund	Sarpsborg
18:00 CEST (UTC+2)	Askar (yellow card) 51'	Report	Diop (yellow card) 37'; Gjesdal 53' (yellow card) 69'; Cirak (yellow card) 87'	Stadium: Sarpsborg Stadion; Attendance: 4,903; Referee: Tore Hansen

16 May 2019 8	Brann	2–1	Sarpsborg 08	Bergen
18:00 CEST (UTC+2)	Berisha 32'; Strand 40'	Report	Askar (yellow card) 25'; Zachariassen (yellow card) 29'; Bateau 58'	Stadium: Brann Stadion; Attendance: 16,484; Referee: Svein Oddvar Moen

19 May 2019 9	Sarpsborg 08	1–3	Ranheim	Sarpsborg
18:00 CEST (UTC+2)	Coulibaly (yellow card) 40'; Zachariassen (yellow card) 49'; Bateau 59'; Thomassen (yellow card) 71'; Næss (yellow card) 82'	Report	Rønning 45'; Reginiussen 51'; Solbakken (yellow card) 59'; Skarsem 74'; Tønne (yellow card) 89'	Stadium: Sarpsborg Stadion; Attendance: 4,767; Referee: Sigurd Smehus Kringstad

16 June 2019 11	Sarpsborg 08	2–0	Odd	Sarpsborg
18:00 CEST (UTC+2)	J.Larsen 21', 48'	Report	Berge (yellow card) 71'	Stadium: Sarpsborg Stadion; Attendance: 5,515; Referee: Ola Hobber Nilsen

23 June 2019 12	Vålerenga	1–1	Sarpsborg 08	Oslo
15:00 CEST (UTC+2)	Finne 34'; Adekugbe (yellow card) 88'	Report	Salvesen 19'; Thomassen (yellow card) 73'	Stadium: Intility Arena; Attendance: 8,130; Referee: Kai Erik Steen

1 July 2019 13	Sarpsborg 08	2–2	Strømsgodset	Sarpsborg
19:00 CEST (UTC+2)	J.Larsen (yellow card) 35' (goal) 63'; Halvorsen 49'	Report	Tokstad (yellow card) 25' (goal) 71'; Bateau 29' (o.g.); Spelmann (yellow card) 54'; Hauger (yellow card) 59'; Hamoud (yellow card) 79'	Stadium: Sarpsborg Stadion; Attendance: 5,443; Referee: Tore Hansen

5 July 2019 14	Tromsø	2–0	Sarpsborg 08	Tromsø
19:00 CEST (UTC+2)	Andersen 17'; Valakari 53'; Pedersen (yellow card) 57'; Jenssen (yellow card) 73'	Report	Skålevik (yellow card) 25'; Zachariassen (yellow card) 30'; Lindseth (yellow card) 74'	Stadium: Alfheim Stadion; Attendance: 2,982; Referee: Kristoffer Hagenes

15 July 2019 15	Stabæk	3–3	Sarpsborg 08	Bærum
19:00 CEST (UTC+2)	Kassi (yellow card) 26'; Boli 41' (penalty missed) 45+3'; Vihmann 68'; Bohinen 90+5'	Report	Lindseth 1'; Bateau (yellow card) 10'; Tveter 27'; Skålevik 50'; Vasyutin (yellow card) 90+6'	Stadium: Nadderud Stadion; Attendance: 3,321; Referee: Kristoffer Hagenes

21 July 2019 17	Molde	2–1	Sarpsborg 08	Molde
20:00 CEST (UTC+2)	Eikrem 18'; Aursnes (yellow card) 35'; Sjølstad 75'; Haugen (yellow card) 90+5'	Report	Skålevik (yellow card) 44'; Zachariassen 72'	Stadium: Aker Stadion; Attendance: 7,027; Referee: Tommy Skjerven
Note: The home match against Sarpsborg was scheduled to the weekend of 10–12 August 2019, but was moved ahead to 21 July 2019 due to Molde's preparation for the Europa League.

3 August 2019 16	Sarpsborg 08	1–1	Rosenborg	Sarpsborg
18:00 CEST (UTC+2)	Thomassen 3'; Lindseth (yellow card) 30'; Straalman (yellow card) 53'	Report	Jensen 12'; Trondsen (yellow card) 67'; Meling (yellow card) 77'	Stadium: Sarpsborg Stadion; Attendance: 7,042; Referee: Rohit Saggi

14 August 2019 10	Viking	2–1	Sarpsborg 08	Stavanger
19:00 CEST (UTC+2)	Østensen (yellow card) 48'; Tripić 50'; Hove (yellow card) 83'; Høiland 88' (pen.)	Report	Askar (yellow card) 26' (yellow-red card) 67'; Skålevik (yellow card) 66'; Straalman 72'	Stadium: Viking Stadion; Attendance: 7,020; Referee: Sigurd Smehus Kringstad
Note: The match was supposed to be played 27 May, but was postponed due to Viking having 2 players at the U-20 World Cup.

19 August 2018 18	Sarpsborg 08	1–1	Bodø/Glimt	Sarpsborg
19:00 CEST (UTC+2)	Zachariassen 55'; Abdellaoue (yellow card) 74'; Ødegaard (yellow card) 77'; Nielsen (yellow card) 85'	Report	Evjen (yellow card) 36'; Berg (yellow card) 66'; Saltnes 83'	Stadium: Sarpsborg Stadion; Attendance: 5,311; Referee: Espen Eskås

25 August 2019 19	Strømsgodset	2–1	Sarpsborg 08	Drammen
20:00 CEST (UTC+2)	Maigaard 60'; Salvesen 68'; Mendy (yellow card) 72'	Report	Zachariassen 46'; Lindseth (yellow card) 87'	Stadium: Marienlyst Stadion; Attendance: 4,855; Referee: Dag Vidar Hafsås

1 September 2019 20	Sarpsborg 08	2–2	Viking	Sarpsborg
18:00 CEST (UTC+2)	Lafferty (yellow card) 69' (yellow-red card); Coulibaly (yellow card) 24'; Ødegaard 38'; Thomassen (yellow card) 45+2'; Mos 56'	Report	Thorstvedt (yellow card) 16'; Friðjónsson (yellow card) 79'; Høiland 85'; Østensen 90'	Stadium: Sarpsborg Stadion; Attendance: 5,366; Referee: Kai Erik Steen

16 September 2019 21	Sarpsborg 08	1–0	Vålerenga	Sarpsborg
19:00 CEST (UTC+2)	Lindseth 44'; Zachariassen (yellow card) 90+4'; Askar (yellow card) 90+5'	Report	Vega (yellow card) 90+3'	Stadium: Sarpsborg Stadion; Attendance: 5,454; Referee: Tom Harald Hagen

22 September 2019 22	Odd	3–0	Sarpsborg 08	Skien
18:00 CEST (UTC+2)	Delaveris 29', 33'; Børven 58'	Report	Vetti (yellow card) 32'; Coulibaly (yellow card) 50'; Lafferty (yellow card) 69'	Stadium: Skagerak Arena; Attendance: 5,496; Referee: Trygve Kjensli

29 September 2019 23	Sarpsborg 08	0–0	Stabæk	Sarpsborg
18:00 CEST (UTC+2)	Halvorsen (yellow card) 73'	Report	Moe (yellow card) 70'; Skytte (yellow card) 79'	Stadium: Sarpsborg Stadion; Attendance: 4,971; Referee: Tommy Skjerven

6 October 2019 24	Ranheim	0–2	Sarpsborg 08	Trondheim
18:00 CEST (UTC+2)		Report	K.Larsen 29'; Ødegaard 60'	Stadium: EXTRA Arena; Attendance: 1,833; Referee: Tom Harald Hagen

20 October 2019 25	Sarpsborg 08	1–1	Brann	Sarpsborg
20:00 CEST (UTC+2)	Lafferty (yellow card) 88' (goal) 89'	Report	Teniste 14'; Acosta (yellow card) 88'	Stadium: Sarpsborg Stadion; Attendance: 4,947; Referee: Dag Vidar Hafsås

27 October 2019 26	Mjøndalen	0–0	Sarpsborg 08	Mjøndalen
18:00 CET (UTC+2)		Report	Ødegaard (yellow card) 49'	Stadium: Consto Arena; Attendance: 2,273; Referee: Ola Hobber Nilsen

3 November 2019 27	Sarpsborg 08	3–2	Tromsø	Sarpsborg
18:00 CET (UTC+2)	Lafferty (yellow card) 25'; Zachariassen 30'; Utvik 51'; Halvorsen 53'	Report	Valakari 13' (yellow card) 53'; Barlow 86'	Stadium: Sarpsborg Stadion; Attendance: 6,267; Referee: Espen Eskås

10 November 2019 28	Kristiansund	4–0	Sarpsborg 08	Kristiansund
18:00 CET (UTC+2)	Isaksen 13'; Letellier 30' (o.g.); Aasbak 62'; Sørli 67'	Report	Abdellaoue (yellow card) 23'; Gunnarsson (yellow card) 45+2'; Lindseth (yellow card) 90+1'	Stadium: Kristiansund Stadion; Attendance: 3,856; Referee: Rohit Saggi

24 November 2019 29	Sarpsborg 08	1–1	Haugesund	Sarpsborg
18:00 CET (UTC+2)	Zachariassen 17'	Report	Pedersen (yellow card) 21'; Samuelsen 75'	Stadium: Sarpsborg Stadion; Attendance: 5,924; Referee: Trygve Kjensli

1 December 2019 30	Lillestrøm	0–0	Sarpsborg 08	Lillestrøm
18:00 CET (UTC+2)	Rafn (yellow card) 20'; Salquist (yellow card) 89'	Report	Zachariassen (yellow card) 39'; Ødegaard (yellow card) 47'	Stadium: Åråsen Stadion; Attendance: 5,293; Referee: Svein Oddvar Moen

==== Table ====
Pos	Team	Pld	W	D	L	GF	GA	GD	Pts	Qualification or relegation
10	Vålerenga	30	8	10	12	39	44	−5	34	
11	Strømsgodset	30	8	8	14	41	54	−13	32	
12	Sarpsborg 08	30	5	15	10	30	40	−10	30	
13	Mjøndalen	30	6	12	12	38	52	−14	30	
14	Lillestrøm (R)	30	7	9	14	32	47	−15	30	Qualification for the relegation play-offs

Source: Football Association of Norway (in Norwegian), Soccerway
Rules for classification: 1) Points; 2) Goal difference; 3) Goals scored; 4) Head-to-head points; 5) Head-to-head goal difference; 6) Head-to-head away goals scored (only if between two teams); 7) Head-to-head goals scored; 8) Play-off (only used to decide champions or relegation).
(R) Relegated

=== Norwegian Cup ===
1 May 2019 First Round	Sprint-Jeløy	0–3	Sarpsborg 08	Moss
18:00 CEST (UTC+2)	D.Perez (yellow card) 40'; A.Andresen (yellow card) 53'; K.Johannessen (yellow card) 63'; T.Tangen (yellow card) 64'	Report	Ruud Tveter 59'; Salvesen 69'; J.Larsen 73'	Stadium: Bellevue Kunstgress; Attendance: 800; Referee: Ole-Alexander Ekeli Valen

22 May 2019 Second Round	Fredrikstad	0–2	Sarpsborg 08	Fredrikstad
20:00 CEST (UTC+2)		Report	Skålevik 48'; Azofeifa (yellow card) 53'; Salvesen (yellow card) 79'; Salvesen 83'	Stadium: Fredrikstad Stadion; Attendance: 6,087; Referee: Christian Moen

19 June 2019 Third Round	Tromsdalen	1–0	Sarpsborg 08	Tromsø
18:00 CEST (UTC+2)	Johnsen (yellow card) 31' (yellow-red card) 35'; Bendiksen (yellow card) 41'; Kristoffersen 61'; Arnebrott (yellow card) 88'	Report	Zachariassen (yellow card) 18'	Stadium: TUIL Arena; Attendance: 1,004; Referee: Mads Skarsem

== Squad statistics ==
As of match played 1 December 2019

=== Appearances and goals ===
No.	Pos	Nat	Player	Total		Eliteserien		Norwegian Cup	
No.	Pos	Nat	Player	Apps	Goals	Apps	Goals	Apps	Goals
2	DF	(Netherlands) NED	Bart Straalman	2	1	2	1	0	0
3	DF	(Norway) NOR	Jørgen Horn	6	0	6	0	0	0
4	DF	(Norway) NOR	Bjørn Inge Utvik	10	1	10	1	0	0
5	DF	(Norway) NOR	Niklas Gunnarsson	10	0	10	0	0	0
6	DF	(Norway) NOR	Nicolai Næss	23	1	20	1	3	0
7	MF	(Norway) NOR	Ole Jørgen Halvorsen	28	2	23+3	2	1+1	0
8	MF	(Denmark) DEN	Matti Lund Nielsen	28	0	23+3	0	1+1	0
10	FW	(Norway) NOR	Steffen Lie Skålevik	24	2	11+10	1	3	1
11	MF	(Norway) NOR	Jonathan Lindseth	31	3	26+2	3	3	0
13	DF	(Austria) AUT	Mario Pavelić	8	0	7+1	0	0	0
15	MF	(Norway) NOR	Gaute Høberg Vetti	14	0	11+3	0	0	0
16	DF	(Norway) NOR	Joachim Thomassen	30	1	27	1	3	0
17	MF	(Norway) NOR	Kristoffer Zachariassen	32	6	29	6	3	0
18	MF	(Norway) NOR	Sebastian Jarl	1	0	0+1	0	0	0
19	FW	(Norway) NOR	Kristoffer Larsen	15	1	6+7	1	1+1	0
20	DF	(Norway) NOR	Magnar Ødegaard	14	2	13+1	2	0	0
21	FW	(Norway) NOR	Mustafa Abdellaoue	11	1	8+3	1	0	0
22	MF	(Norway) NOR	Jon-Helge Tveita	9	0	9	0	0	0
26	MF	(Mali) MLI	Ismaila Coulibaly	14	0	5+8	0	1	0
27	FW	(Mali) MLI	Aboubacar Konté	2	0	0+1	0	0+1	0
28	FW	(Norway) NOR	Alexander Ruud Tveter	5	2	2+2	1	1	1
30	GK	(France) FRA	Alexandre Letellier	15	0	15	0	0	0
31	GK	(Norway) NOR	Aslak Falch	4	0	2	0	2	0
44	MF	(Croatia) CRO	Mate Maleš	1	0	0+1	0	0	0
45	FW	(Norway) NOR	Jørgen Strand Larsen	25	5	16+6	4	1+2	1
48	FW	(Northern Ireland) NIR	Kyle Lafferty	9	1	8+1	1	0	0
77	MF	(Ethiopia) ETH	Amin Askar	13	0	10+3	0	0	0
Players away from Sarpsborg 08 on loan:
14	MF	(Costa Rica) CRC	Wílmer Azofeifa	8	0	2+3	0	3	0
24	MF	(Norway) NOR	Anwar Elyounoussi	8	0	1+5	0	1+1	0
Players who left Sarpsborg 08 during the season:
44	DF	(Trinidad and Tobago) TTO	Sheldon Bateau	16	2	9+4	2	3	0
78	GK	(Russia) RUS	Aleksandr Vasyutin	14	0	13	0	1	0
88	FW	(Norway) NOR	Lars-Jørgen Salvesen	17	4	6+7	2	1+3	2

=== Goal scorers ===
Place	Position	Nation	Number	Name	Eliteserien	Norwegian Cup	Total
1	MF	(Norway)	17	Kristoffer Zachariassen	6	0	6
2	FW	(Norway)	45	Jørgen Strand Larsen	4	1	5
3	FW	(Norway)	88	Lars-Jørgen Salvesen	2	2	4
4	MF	(Norway)	11	Jonathan Lindseth	3	0	3
5	DF	(Trinidad and Tobago)	44	Sheldon Bateau	2	0	2
5	DF	(Norway)	20	Magnar Ødegaard	2	0	2
5	MF	(Norway)	7	Ole Jørgen Halvorsen	2	0	2
5	FW	(Norway)	28	Alexander Ruud Tveter	1	1	2
5	FW	(Norway)	10	Steffen Lie Skålevik	1	1	2
10	DF	(Norway)	6	Nicolai Næss	1	0	1
10	DF	(Norway)	16	Joachim Thomassen	1	0	1
10	DF	(Netherlands)	2	Bart Straalman	1	0	1
10	FW	(Norway)	21	Mustafa Abdellaoue	1	0	1
10	MF	(Norway)	19	Kristoffer Larsen	1	0	1
10	FW	(Northern Ireland)	48	Kyle Lafferty	1	0	1
10	DF	(Norway)	4	Bjørn Inge Utvik	1	0	1
				TOTALS	30	5	35

=== Clean sheets ===
Place	Position	Nation	Number	Name	Eliteserien	Norwegian Cup	Total
1	GK	(France)	30	Alexandre Letellier	5	0	5
2	GK	(Russia)	78	Aleksandr Vasyutin	2	1	3
3	GK	(Norway)	31	Aslak Falch	0	1	1
				TOTALS	7	2	9

=== Disciplinary record ===
Number	Nation	Position	Name	Eliteserien		Norwegian Cup		Total	
Number	Nation	Position	Name	Yellow card	Red card	Yellow card	Red card	Yellow card	Red card
2	(Netherlands)	DF	Bart Straalman	1	0	0	0	1	0
3	(Norway)	DF	Jørgen Horn	1	0	0	0	1	0
5	(Norway)	DF	Niklas Gunnarsson	1	0	0	0	1	0
6	(Norway)	DF	Nicolai Næss	1	0	0	0	1	0
7	(Norway)	MF	Ole Jørgen Halvorsen	4	0	0	0	4	0
8	(Denmark)	MF	Matti Lund Nielsen	2	0	0	0	2	0
10	(Norway)	FW	Steffen Lie Skålevik	4	0	0	0	4	0
11	(Norway)	MF	Jonathan Lindseth	5	0	0	0	5	0
14	(Costa Rica)	MF	Wílmer Azofeifa	0	0	1	0	1	0
15	(Norway)	MF	Gaute Høberg Vetti	1	0	0	0	1	0
16	(Norway)	MF	Joachim Thomassen	4	0	0	0	4	0
17	(Norway)	MF	Kristoffer Zachariassen	6	0	1	0	7	0
20	(Norway)	DF	Magnar Ødegaard	3	0	0	0	3	0
21	(Norway)	FW	Mustafa Abdellaoue	2	0	0	0	2	0
26	(Mali)	MF	Ismaila Coulibaly	3	0	0	0	3	0
45	(Norway)	FW	Jørgen Strand Larsen	2	0	0	0	2	0
48	(Northern Ireland)	FW	Kyle Lafferty	5	1	0	0	5	1
77	(Ethiopia)	MF	Amin Askar	5	1	0	0	5	1
Players away on loan:
Players who left Sarpsborg 08 during the season:
44	(Trinidad and Tobago)	DF	Sheldon Bateau	1	0	0	0	1	0
78	(Russia)	GK	Aleksandr Vasyutin	1	0	0	0	1	0
88	(Norway)	FW	Lars-Jørgen Salvesen	0	0	1	0	1	0
			TOTALS	52	2	3	0	55	2
