= Gaute Høberg Vetti =

Norwegian footballer (born 1998)

Gaute Vetti
Personal information
- Full name: Gaute Høberg Vetti
- Date of birth: 2 September 1998 (age 28)
- Place of birth: Bergen, Norway
- Height: 1.80 m (5 ft 11 in)
- Position: Midfielder

Team information
- Current team: Stabæk
- Number: 17

Youth career
- 2014–2016: Brann

Senior career*
| Years | Team | Apps | (Gls) |
| 2017 | Nest-Sotra | 23 | (1) |
| 2018–2021 | Sarpsborg 08 | 44 | (1) |
| 2022–2025 | Bodø/Glimt | 8 | (0) |
| 2023 | → Stabæk (loan) | 9 | (0) |
| 2026– | Stabæk | 4 | (1) |

International career^{‡}
| 2016 | Norway U18 | 4 | (0) |
| 2019 | Norway U21 | 3 | (0) |
- * Club domestic league appearances and goals as of 4 December 2023 ‡ National team caps and goals as of 13 February 2024

Gaute Høberg Vetti (born 2 September 1998) is a Norwegian professional footballer who plays as a midfielder.

== Club career ==
Born in Bergen, Vetti played for local club Brann in his youth. His senior deubt came for Nest-Sotra in 2017, before securing a transfer to Sarpsborg 08 before the start of the following season.

In January 2022, Vetti signed with Bodø Glimt.

Vetti spent the second half of the 2023 season on loan at fellow Eliteserien side Stabæk.

In July 2025 it was announced that Vetti would leave Bodø/Glimt at the end of the month following the expiry of his contract.

== International career ==
Vetti has represented Norway both at under-18 and under-21 level.

== Career statistics ==
As of 30 October 2026

Appearances and goals by club, season and competition
| Club | Season | League | | | National cup | | Other | | Total | |
| Club | Season | Division | Apps | Goals | Apps | Goals | Apps | Goals | Apps | Goals |
|---|---|---|---|---|---|---|---|---|---|---|
| Nest-Sotra | 2017 | PostNord-ligaen | 23 | 1 | 3 | 1 | — | | 26 | 2 |
| Sarpsborg 08 | 2018 | Eliteserien | 7 | 0 | 2 | 0 | 2 (Note: Appearances in the UEFA Europa League) | 0 | 11 | 0 |
| Sarpsborg 08 | 2019 | Eliteserien | 14 | 0 | 0 | 0 | — | | 14 | 0 |
| Sarpsborg 08 | 2020 | Eliteserien | 15 | 1 | — | | — | | 15 | 1 |
| Sarpsborg 08 | 2021 | Eliteserien | 8 | 0 | 1 | 0 | — | | 9 | 0 |
| Sarpsborg 08 | Total | | 44 | 1 | 3 | 0 | 2 | 0 | 49 | 1 |
| Bodø/Glimt | 2022 | Eliteserien | 8 | 0 | 4 | 0 | 1 (Note: Appearance in the UEFA Champions League) | 0 | 13 | 0 |
| Bodø/Glimt | 2023 | Eliteserien | 0 | 0 | 0 | 0 | 0 | 0 | 0 | 0 |
| Bodø/Glimt | 2024 | Eliteserien | 0 | 0 | 0 | 0 | 0 | 0 | 0 | 0 |
| Bodø/Glimt | Total | | 8 | 0 | 4 | 0 | 1 | 0 | 13 | 0 |
| Stabæk (loan) | 2023 | Eliteserien | 9 | 0 | 0 | 0 | — | | 9 | 0 |
| Stabæk | 2026 | OBOS-ligaen | 4 | 1 | 0 | 0 | — | | 4 | 1 |
| Career total | | | 88 | 3 | 10 | 1 | 3 | 0 | 101 | 4 |
