= Ismaila Coulibaly =

Malian footballer

Personal information
- Full name: Ismaila Cheick Coulibaly
- Date of birth: 25 December 2000 (age 25)
- Place of birth: Mali
- Height: 1.83 m (6 ft 0 in)
- Position: Midfielder

Team information
- Current team: La Louvière
- Number: 48

Youth career
- –2018: Duguwolofila

Senior career*
Years	Team	Apps	(Gls)
2019–2020	Sarpsborg 08	27	(4)
2020–2025	Sheffield United	1	(0)
2020–2022	→ Beerschot (loan)	42	(5)
2024	→ AIK (loan)	10	(2)
2025–2026	LASK	31	(1)
2026–	La Louvière	2	(0)

International career^{‡}
2019	Mali U20	2	(0)
2023–	Mali	1	(0)
- * Club domestic league appearances and goals as of 16 August 2026 ‡ National team caps and goals as of 04:23, 3 April 2023 (UTC)

Ismaila Cheick Coulibaly (born 25 December 2000) is a Malian footballer who plays as a midfielder for Belgian Pro League club La Louvière and the Mali national team.

== Career ==
On 14 January 2019, Sarpsborg 08 announced the signing of Coulibaly to a four-year contract.

On 9 September 2020, Premier League club Sheffield United announced the signing of Coulibaly and immediately sent him to Belgian First Division A side Beerschot on a three-year loan deal. The loan was terminated after two seasons following Beerschot's relegation from the Belgian top tier.

Coulibaly made his debut for the senior squad of Sheffield United on 7 January 2023 in a FA Cup matchup against Millwall and made his first start on 7 February 2023 in the fourth-round replay win over Wrexham. 4 days later he made his league debut as a late substitute in a 3–0 EFL Championship victory over Swansea City.

On 3 January 2025, Coulibaly joined Austrian Bundesliga side LASK on a three-and-a-half year deal for an undisclosed fee.

In the summer of 2026, Coulibaly moved to La Louvière in Belgium.

== International career ==
In late March 2023, he made his international debut for Mali.

== Career statistics ==
=== Club ===
As of match played 4 May 2026

Club	Season	League			National cup (Note: Includes Norwegian Football Cup, Belgian Cup, FA Cup, Svenska Cupen, Austrian Cup)		League cup (Note: Includes EFL Cup)		Total	
Club	Season	Division	Apps	Goals	Apps	Goals	Apps	Goals	Apps	Goals
Sarpsborg 08	2019	Eliteserien	13	0	1	0	–		14	0
Sarpsborg 08	2020	Eliteserien	14	4	0	0	–		14	3
Sarpsborg 08	Total		27	4	1	0	–		28	4
Sheffield United	2020–21	Premier League	0	0	0	0	0	0	0	0
Sheffield United	2021–22	Championship	0	0	0	0	0	0	0	0
Sheffield United	2022–23	Championship	1	0	5	0	0	0	6	0
Sheffield United	2023–24	Premier League	0	0	0	0	1	0	1	0
Sheffield United	2024–25	Championship	0	0	0	0	2	0	2	0
Sheffield United	Total		1	0	5	0	3	0	9	0
Beerschot (Loan)	2020–21	Belgian First Division A	22	5	1	0	–		23	5
Beerschot (Loan)	2021–22	Belgian First Division A	20	0	1	0	–		21	0
Beerschot (Loan)	Total		42	5	2	0	–		44	5
AIK (loan)	2024	Allsvenskan	10	2	3	0	–		13	2
LASK	2024–25	Austrian Bundesliga	10	1	2	0	–		12	1
LASK	2025–26	Austrian Bundesliga	20	0	3	0	–		23	0
LASK	Total		30	1	5	0	–		35	1
Career total			110	12	16	0	3	0	128	12

=== International ===
As of match played 28 March 2023

Appearances and goals by national team and year
National team	Year	Apps	Goals
Mali	2023	1	0
Total		1	0

== Honours ==
LASK

- Austrian Bundesliga: 2025–26
- Austrian Cup: 2025–26
