= Jørgen Strand Larsen =

Norwegian footballer (born 2000)

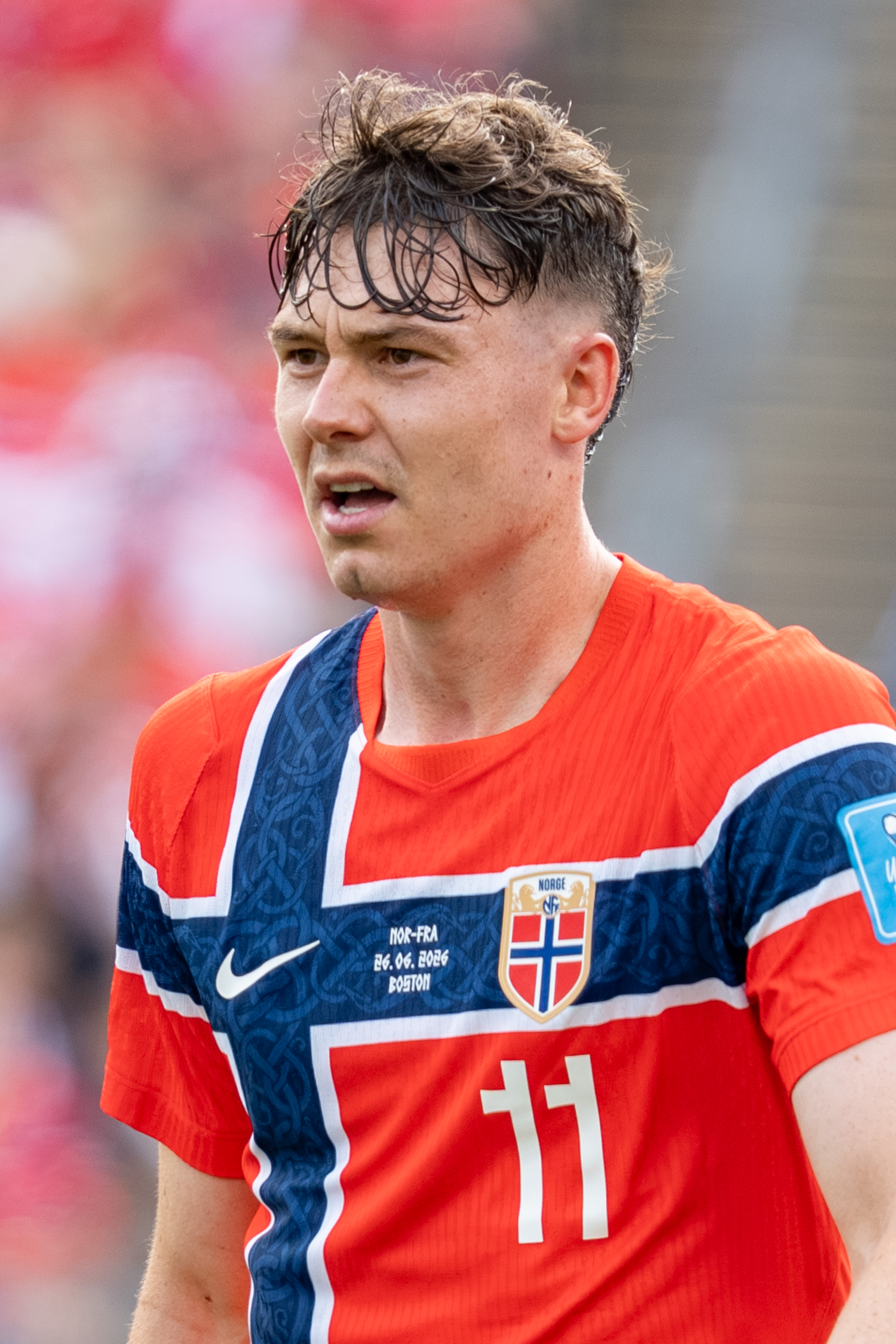
- Larsen with Norway in 2026

Personal information
- Full name: Jørgen Strand Larsen
- Date of birth: 6 February 2000 (age 26)
- Place of birth: Fredrikstad, Norway
- Height: 1.94 m (6 ft 4 in)
- Position: Striker

Team information
- Current team: Crystal Palace
- Number: 22

Youth career
- –2014: Kvik Halden
- 2015–2017: Sarpsborg 08
- 2017–2018: → AC Milan (loan)

Senior career*
Years	Team	Apps	(Gls)
2017–2020	Sarpsborg 08	48	(6)
2020–2022	Groningen	67	(24)
2022–2025	Celta Vigo	69	(17)
2024–2025	→ Wolverhampton Wanderers (loan)	35	(14)
2025–2026	Wolverhampton Wanderers	22	(1)
2026–	Crystal Palace	23	(5)

International career^{‡}
2016–2017	Norway U16	12	(6)
2017	Norway U17	9	(3)
2018	Norway U18	12	(1)
2019	Norway U19	7	(4)
2019	Norway U20	1	(0)
2019–2022	Norway U21	16	(11)
2020–	Norway	33	(6)
- * Club domestic league appearances and goals as of 18:09, 21 November 2026 (UTC) ‡ National team caps and goals as of 5 October 2026

Jørgen Strand Larsen (Norwegian: [ˈjøːɾɡən strɑn ˈlɑːɾsən], born 6 February 2000) is a Norwegian professional footballer who plays as a striker for Premier League club Crystal Palace and the Norway national team. He is known for his link-up play, aerial ability and mobility.

Strand Larsen began his senior career at Eliteserien side Sarpsborg 08 in 2017, and later went on to play for Eredivisie side Groningen, La Liga club Celta de Vigo, and Premier League side Wolverhampton Wanderers. In 2026, he was signed for a club-record fee of £48 million by Crystal Palace, winning the UEFA Conference League in his first season.

A former youth international, Strand Larsen made his senior debut for Norway in 2020, later helping them to qualification for the 2026 FIFA World Cup.

== Early life ==
Jørgen Strand Larsen was born on 6 February 2000 in Halden, Østfold.

== Club career ==
=== Early career ===
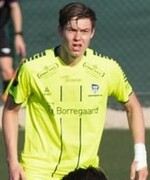
Strand Larsen with Sarpsborg 08 in 2019

Strand Larsen started his career as a youth player with Kvik Halden before joining Sarpsborg 08. During this time he also played other sports, including tennis, ice hockey and golf. On 26 April, Strand Larsen made his debut with the senior team in a cup match, where he scored a hat trick in a 10–1 win against Drøbak-Frogn IL. Strand Larsen made his league debut on 21 May 2017 as a substitute against Vålerenga. He was soon loaned out to the AC Milan Primavera and spent the entire 2017–18 season playing youth football in Italy. However, as Milan decided against the complete transfer, he returned to the club in July 2018.

On 9 September 2020, Strand Larsen signed a four-year contract with Eredivisie club Groningen. He debuted as a starter in a 3–1 defeat to PSV, in which he contributed an assist. Strand Larsen was selected in the Eredivisie Team of the Month for November 2021. He was named as Groningen's Player of the Year in May 2022.

=== Celta ===
Strand Larsen signed for La Liga club Celta in August 2022 for a transfer fee of €11 million. On 2 September, he contributed an assist on his debut, a 3–0 win over Cádiz in La Liga. He scored his first goal in the competition on 13 January 2023, in the 68th minute of a 1–1 draw against Villarreal. In the 2023–24 season, he was the top scorer for his club in La Liga with 13 goals. During his time at Celta, he was affectionately known as Xurxo, the Galician form of his name.

=== Wolverhampton Wanderers ===
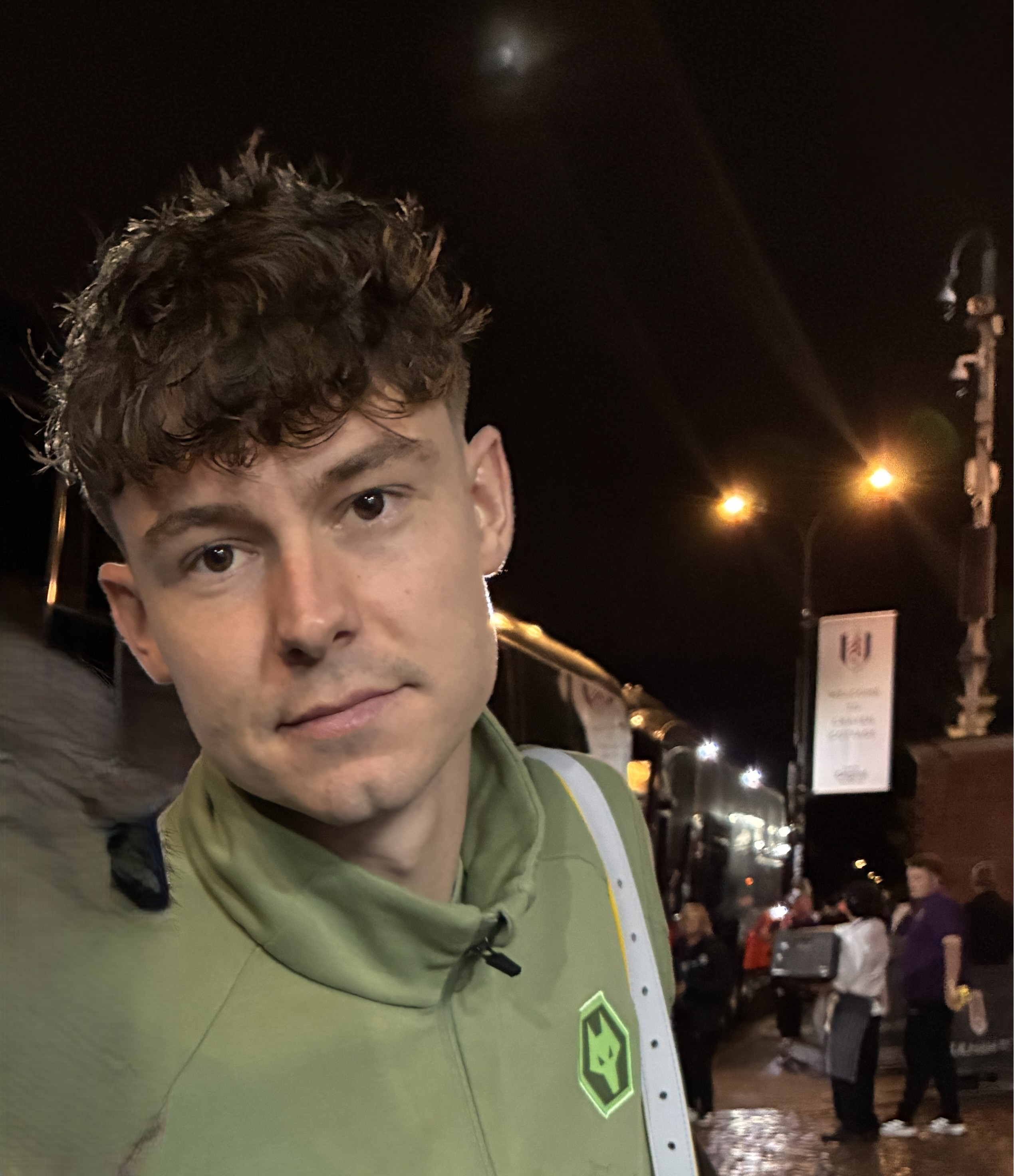
Strand Larsen during his time at Wolverhampton Wanderers.

On 2 July 2024, Strand Larsen signed for Premier League club Wolverhampton Wanderers on an initial loan deal with a €30 million option to buy. On 25 August, he scored his first goal for Wolves in a 6–2 loss to Chelsea. Strand Larsen later began a scoring run in March 2025, and his form in April, which included netting in three consecutive matches, saw him earn a nomination for Player of the Month. He finished his debut season with 14 goals, making him his club's second-highest scorer behind Matheus Cunha.

On 1 July, Wolves announced that Strand Larsen had signed for the club permanently until 2029 after the option to buy in his loan deal was met. Over the summer, the club rejected two bids for Strand Larsen from Newcastle United, the second believed to be worth £55 million. On 19 September 2025, following the rejection of multiple transfer bids during the summer transfer window, Strand Larsen signed a new five-year contract with Wolves, with an option for an additional year.

=== Crystal Palace ===
On 2 February 2026, Strand Larsen was signed by fellow Premier League club Crystal Palace for a club-record fee worth up to £48 million.

On 8 February, Strand Larsen made his debut for Palace, playing the full match in a 1–0 win at Brighton & Hove Albion. Three days later, he scored twice against Burnley on his home debut. He scored his first European goal in the away leg of the semi-final game against Shakhtar Donetsk on 30 Apr 2026.

== International career ==
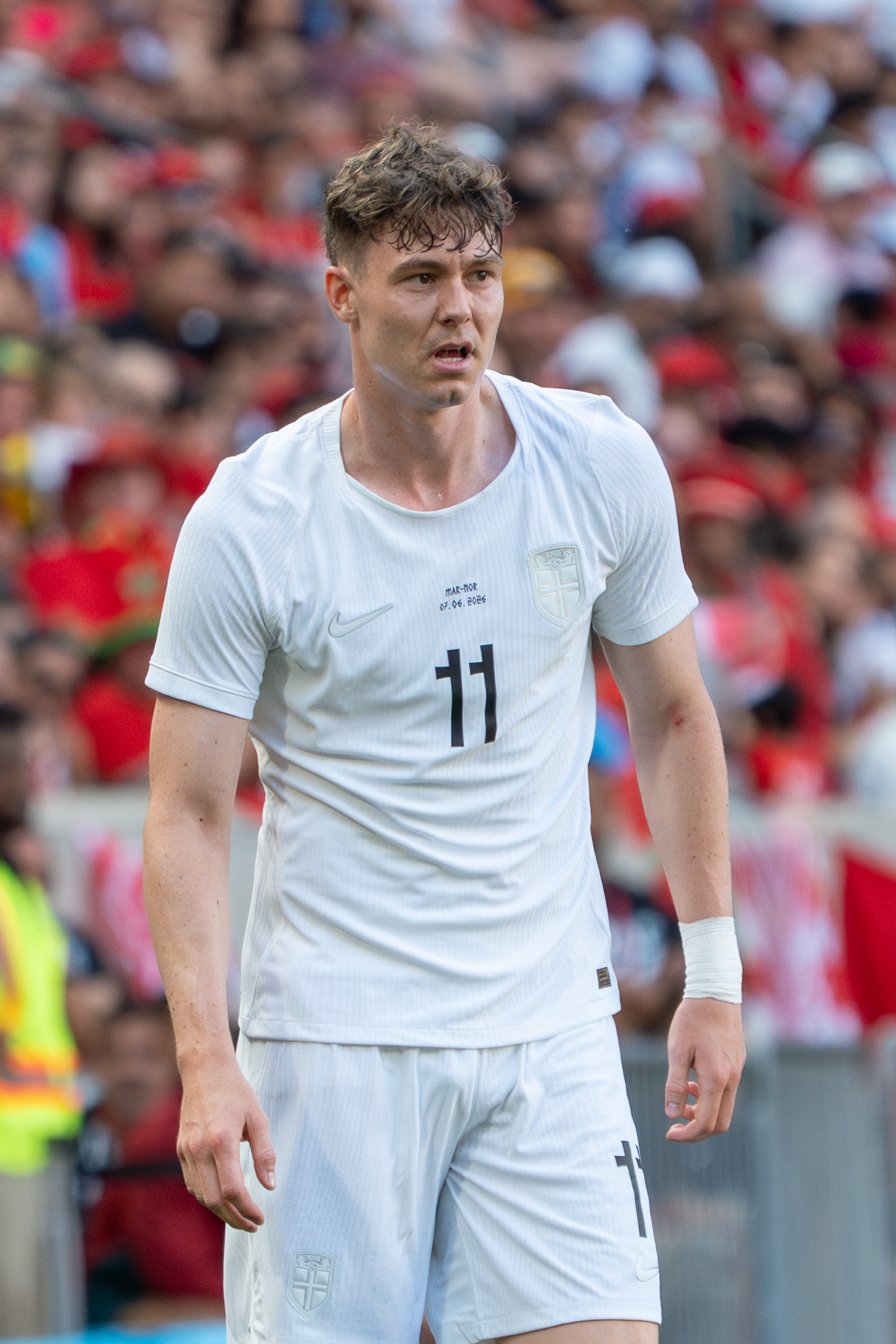
Strand Larsen with Norway in 2026

Strand Larsen played for the Norway under-17 national team at the 2017 UEFA European Under-17 Championship, in which he scored a goal against the Netherlands in a 2–2 draw in the group stage.

In November 2020, Strand Larsen received his first call-up to the Norwegian senior team, debuting against Austria. On 7 September 2023, Strand Larsen scored his first senior goal for Norway and contributed two assists in a 6–0 friendly win against Jordan.

On 16 November 2025, he scored a stoppage-time goal in a 4–1 away victory over Italy during the 2026 FIFA World Cup qualification, inflicting the hosts' worst home defeat since 1983 and securing his nation's place at the 2026 FIFA World Cup.

In Norway's final group match of the 2026 FIFA World Cup on 28 July 2026, a 4–1 defeat against group winners France, Larsen had a penalty saved by Mike Maignan; Norway advanced to the knock-out stages after finishing second in their group. On 11 July, he replaced Erling Haaland in the quarter-finals in the last 15 minutes of extra-time. However, Norway were eliminated following 2–1 loss to England.

== Career statistics ==
=== Club ===
As of match played 21 November 2026

Appearances and goals by club, season and competition
Club	Season	League			National cup (Note: Includes Norwegian Cup, KNVB Cup, Copa del Rey, FA Cup)		League cup (Note: Includes EFL Cup)		Europe		Total	
Club	Season	Division	Apps	Goals	Apps	Goals	Apps	Goals	Apps	Goals	Apps	Goals
Sarpsborg 08	2017	Eliteserien	3	0	3	3	–		–		6	3
Sarpsborg 08	2018	Eliteserien	6	0	0	0	–		5 (Note: Appearances in UEFA Europa League)	0	11	0
Sarpsborg 08	2019	Eliteserien	23	4	3	1	–		–		26	5
Sarpsborg 08	2020	Eliteserien	16	2	0	0	–		–		16	2
Sarpsborg 08	Total		48	6	6	4	–		5	0	59	10
Groningen	2020–21	Eredivisie	31	9	1	0	–		–		32	9
Groningen	2021–22	Eredivisie	32	14	3	3	–		–		35	17
Groningen	2022–23	Eredivisie	4	1	—		–		–		4	1
Groningen	Total		67	24	4	3	–		–		71	27
Celta	2022–23	La Liga	32	4	3	1	–		–		35	5
Celta	2023–24	La Liga	37	13	2	0	–		–		39	13
Celta	Total		69	17	5	1	–		–		74	18
Wolverhampton Wanderers (loan)	2024–25	Premier League	35	14	2	0	1	0	–		38	14
Wolverhampton Wanderers	2025–26	Premier League	22	1	1	3	3	2	–		26	6
Wolverhampton Wanderers	Wolves total		57	15	3	3	4	2	–		64	20
Crystal Palace	2025–26	Premier League	14	3	–		–		8 (Note: Appearances in UEFA Conference League)	1	22	4
Crystal Palace	2026–27	Premier League	9	2	0	0	1	2	3	1	13	5
Crystal Palace	Total		23	5	0	0	1	2	11	2	35	9
Career total			263	67	18	11	5	4	15	1	302	84

=== International ===
As of match played 4 October 2026

Appearances and goals by national team and year
National team	Year	Apps	Goals
Norway	2020	1	0
Norway	2021	0	0
Norway	2022	3	0
Norway	2023	7	3
Norway	2024	8	0
Norway	2025	5	1
Norway	2026	9	2
Total		33	6

Scores and results list Norway's goal tally first, score column indicates score after each Strand Larsen goal.

List of international goals scored by Jørgen Strand Larsen
No.	Date	Venue	Opponent	Score	Result	Competition
1	7 September 2023	Ullevaal Stadion, Oslo, Norway	Jordan	3–0	6–0	Friendly
2	16 November 2023	Ullevaal Stadion, Oslo, Norway	Faroe Islands	1–0	2–0	Friendly
3	20 November 2023	Hampden Park, Glasgow, Scotland	Scotland	2–1	3–3	UEFA Euro 2024 qualification
4	16 November 2025	San Siro, Milan, Italy	Italy	4–1	4–1	2026 FIFA World Cup qualification
5	1 June 2026	Ullevaal Stadion, Oslo, Norway	Sweden	1–0	3–1	Friendly
6	1 June 2026	Ullevaal Stadion, Oslo, Norway	Sweden	3–0	3–1	Friendly

== Honours ==
Crystal Palace

- UEFA Conference League: 2025–26

Norway U17

- Syrenka Cup: 2016

Individual

- Crystal Palace Goal of the Season: 2025–26
