= Magnar Ødegaard =

Norwegian footballer (born 1993)

Personal information
- Full name: Magnar Ødegaard
- Date of birth: 11 May 1993 (age 33)
- Place of birth: Fredrikstad, Norway
- Height: 1.86 m (6 ft 1 in)
- Position: Centre back

Youth career
- Skjeberg
- Borgen
- Sarpsborg 08

Senior career*
Years	Team	Apps	(Gls)
2009–2012	Sarpsborg 08	71	(1)
2012–2014	Molde	8	(0)
2013–2014	→ Lillestrøm (loan)	22	(0)
2015–2018	Tromsø	114	(2)
2019	AIK	0	(0)
2019–2026	Sarpsborg 08	130	(3)

International career^{‡}
2008	Norway U15	4	(0)
2009	Norway U16	11	(0)
2010	Norway U17	5	(0)
2010–2011	Norway U18	13	(0)
2011–2012	Norway U19	15	(1)
2012	Norway U20	2	(0)
2012–2014	Norway U21	11	(1)
2015	Norway U23	1	(0)
- * Club domestic league appearances and goals as of 26 July 2026 ‡ National team caps and goals as of 15 February 2024

Magnar Ødegaard (Norwegian: [ˈø̂ːdəɡoːr]; born 11 May 1993) is a former Norwegian footballer.

== Club career ==
Ødegaard was born in Fredrikstad and played for Skjeberg SK and Borgen IL during his youth. He later joined Sarpsborg 08, where he made his debut for the first-team in the 2009 Norwegian First Division. He was wanted by Italian club Brescia in June 2010, but Sarpsborg 08 did not give Ødegaard permission to go on a trial mid-season.

Following Sarpsborg 08's promotion to Tippeligaen Ødegaard made his debut in at the first tier on 3 April 2011, when Sarpsborg 08 won 1–0 against Sogndal. In total Ødegaard played 19 matches in the 2011 Norwegian Premier League, when Sarpsborg 08 was relegated. Ødegaard stayed at the club after their relegation to the First Division, and the centre back was chosen by Norwegian TV2 in their "all-star team" half-way through the 2012 season. In July 2012 Ødegaard stated that he would not renew his contract with Sarpsborg 08 which expired at the end of the 2012 season, and said that one of the reason was that he wanted to join a fully professional club. On 12 August 2012 it was announced that Ødegaard had joined Molde for an undisclosed fee, reported by VG to be 500,000 NOK. Ødegaard, who signed a 3,5-year contract with the club, was brought to Molde as a back-up for the centre-backs Vegard Forren and Even Hovland, and to play for Molde's U19-team in the NextGen Series. Ødegaard made his debut for Molde when he replaced Martin Linnes after 67 minutes in the 3–2 victory against Sandnes Ulf on 7 October 2012.

On 15 January 2019, Magnar started a trial period with Bulgarian team Levski Sofia, after leaving Tromsø after his contract expired.

AIK

On 14 February 2019 it was announced Ødegaard had signed a deal with AIK until 31 July 2019, with an option to extend a further 3.5 years. On 1 July 2019, AIK announced that the club would not exercise its option to extend Ødegaard's contract. Ødegaard appeared in 3 Svenska Cupen games for AIK but made no league appearances.

== International career ==
Ødegaard have represented Norway at youth international level on every level from Under-15 to Under-19. He was first called up to the Under-19 team in January 2011 along with his team-mate Hugues Wembangomo, and made his debut for Norway U19 on 8 February 2011 against Sweden U19. In the match against Ukraine U19 on 25 April 2012, Ødegaard scored the equalizing goal from a free-kick. Ødegaard has been captain of the Under-19 team, and in June 2012 he was called up for Norway U21 squad against Azerbaijan U21, but did not play the match. On 14 August 2012, he made his debut for the Under-21 team when he replaced Omar Elabdellaoui after 83 minutes in the friendly match against Austria U21.

== Career statistics ==
As of 26 July 2026

Club	Season	Division	League		National Cup (Note: Including Norwegian Football Cup, Svenska Cupen)		Other		Total	
Club	Season	Division	Apps	Goals	Apps	Goals	Apps	Goals	Apps	Goals
Sarpsborg 08	2009	Adeccoligaen	17	0	0	0	3 (Note: Appearances in the Eliteserien play-offs)	0	20	0
Sarpsborg 08	2010	Adeccoligaen	20	1	1	1	—		21	2
Sarpsborg 08	2011	Tippeligaen	19	0	2	0	—		21	0
Sarpsborg 08	2012	Adeccoligaen	15	0	3	1	—		18	1
Sarpsborg 08	Total		71	1	6	2	3	0	80	3
Molde	2012	Tippeligaen	2	0	0	0	2 (Note: Appearances in the UEFA Europa League)	0	4	0
Molde	2013	Tippeligaen	6	0	3	0	0	0	9	0
Molde	Total		8	0	3	0	2	0	13	0
Lillestrøm (loan)	2013	Tippeligaen	1	0	0	0	—		1	0
Lillestrøm (loan)	2014	Tippeligaen	21	0	5	0	—		26	0
Lillestrøm (loan)	Total		22	0	5	0	—		27	0
Tromsø	2015	Tippeligaen	30	0	2	0	—		32	0
Tromsø	2016	Tippeligaen	27	0	4	0	—		31	0
Tromsø	2017	Eliteserien	29	1	4	0	—		33	1
Tromsø	2018	Eliteserien	28	1	3	0	—		31	1
Tromsø	Total		114	2	13	0	—		127	2
AIK	2019	Allsvenskan	0	0	3	0	0	0	3	0
Sarpsborg 08	2019	Eliteserien	14	2	0	0	—		14	2
Sarpsborg 08	2020	Eliteserien	29	0	0	0	—		29	0
Sarpsborg 08	2021	Eliteserien	27	0	2	0	—		29	0
Sarpsborg 08	2022	Eliteserien	22	1	4	0	—		26	1
Sarpsborg 08	2023	Eliteserien	2	0	0	0	—		2	0
Sarpsborg 08	2024	Eliteserien	13	0	2	0	—		15	0
Sarpsborg 08	2025	Eliteserien	14	0	6	0	—		20	0
Sarpsborg 08	2026	Eliteserien	9	0	1	0	—		10	0
Sarpsborg 08	Total		130	3	15	0	—		145	3
Career Total			345	6	45	2	5	0	395	8
