= Sebastian Jarl =

Norwegian footballer (born 2000)

Personal information
- Date of birth: 11 January 2000 (age 26)
- Height: 1.88 m (6 ft 2 in)
- Position: Midfielder

Team information
- Current team: Vålerenga
- Number: 55

Youth career
- –2017: Kjelsås

Senior career*
Years	Team	Apps	(Gls)
2017–2018	Kjelsås	33	(0)
2019–2021	Sarpsborg 08	20	(1)
2019	→ KFUM (loan)	8	(0)
2022–2024	Kristiansund	57	(1)
2024–	Vålerenga	39	(1)

International career^{‡}
2017	Norway U17	1	(0)
2016	Norway U18	8	(0)
2017	Norway U19	5	(0)
- * Club domestic league appearances and goals as of 23 July 2026 ‡ National team caps and goals as of 1 September 2020

Sebastian Jarl (born 11 January 2000) is a Norwegian football midfielder who plays for Vålerenga.

== Career ==
=== Sarpsborg 08 ===
In January 2019 Jarl signed a three-year contract with Eliteserien club Sarpsborg 08, keeping him at the club until the end of 2021.

The latter half of the 2019 season however, Jarl spent with First Division side KFUM Oslo on loan. There, Jarl and KFUM Oslo would qualify for the Eliteserien play-offs, eventually losing to Start.

=== Kristiansund ===
In December 2021 Jarl signed for fellow Eliteserien club Kristiansund on a two-year contract starting in January 2022.

=== Vålerenga ===
On 18 July 2024, Jarl signed for First Division side Vålerenga, on a contract until end of 2027.

== Personal life ==
He is a son of Kjelsås "club legend" Rune Jarl.

== Career statistics ==
=== Club ===
As of 13 July 2025

Club	Season	League			National Cup		Other		Total	
Club	Season	Division	Apps	Goals	Apps	Goals	Apps	Goals	Apps	Goals
Kjelsås	2017	2. divisjon	11	0	2	0	—		13	0
Kjelsås	2018	2. divisjon	22	0	2	0	—		24	0
Kjelsås	Total		33	0	4	0	—		37	4
Sarpsborg 08	2019	Eliteserien	1	0	0	0	—		1	0
Sarpsborg 08	2020	Eliteserien	13	1	—		—		13	1
Sarpsborg 08	2021	Eliteserien	6	0	2	0	—		8	0
Sarpsborg 08	Total		20	1	2	0	—		22	1
KFUM Oslo (loan)	2019	1. divisjon	6	0	1	0	2 (Note: Appearances in Eliteserien play-offs)	0	9	0
KFUM Oslo (loan)	Total		6	0	1	0	2	0	9	0
Kristiansund	2022	Eliteserien	24	0	2	0	—		26	0
Kristiansund	2023	1. divisjon	18	0	0	0	4	0	22	0
Kristiansund	2024	Eliteserien	15	1	3	0	—		18	1
Kristiansund	Total		57	1	5	0	4	0	63	1
Vålerenga	2024	1. divisjon	16	1	1	0	—		17	1
Vålerenga	2025	Eliteserien	11	0	1	0	—		12	0
Vålerenga	Total		27	1	2	0	0	0	29	1
Career total			143	3	14	0	6	0	163	3
