= Leander Øy =

Norwegian footballer (born 2003)

Personal information
- Full name: Leander Sem-Johansen Øy
- Date of birth: 24 October 2003 (age 23)
- Height: 1.82 m (6 ft 0 in)
- Position: Goalkeeper

Team information
- Current team: Sarpsborg 08
- Number: 87

Youth career
- –2019: Jotun
- 2019–2021: Sarpsborg 08

Senior career*
Years	Team	Apps	(Gls)
2022–	Sarpsborg 08	21	(0)
2025	→ Mjøndalen (loan)	26	(0)

International career^{‡}
2023–2024	Norway U21	2	(0)
- * Club domestic league appearances and goals as of 8 November 2026 ‡ National team caps and goals as of 14 May 2025

Leander Øy (born 24 October 2003) is a Norwegian football goalkeeper who plays for Sarpsborg 08.

== Career ==
Hailing from Årdal Municipality, he is a son of Ivan Øy and brother of Edin Øy, both footballers. In the summer of 2019 he was brought from IL Jotun to Sarpsborg 08, having been spotted in training for the alternate youth national team. He attended St. Olav Upper Secondary School and played for the junior team, but when he started training with Sarpsborg 08's first team in early 2021, he was not allowed to attend school due to the COVID-19 protocols.

Going into 2022, he was the third-choice goalkeeper. In July 2022, he suddenly got his first team debut when Anders Kristiansen was unavailable and reserve Simen Vidtun Nilsen was sent off. He played both league and cup matches in the first half of 2023. In addition, he was selected for Norway U21 and made his international debut against Scotland.

== Career statistics ==
As of 8 November 2026

Club	Season	League			National cup		Total	
Club	Season	Division	Apps	Goals	Apps	Goals	Apps	Goals
Sarpsborg 08	2022	Eliteserien	2	0	0	0	2	0
Sarpsborg 08	2023	Eliteserien	4	0	3	0	7	0
Sarpsborg 08	2024	Eliteserien	0	0	3	0	3	0
Sarpsborg 08	2026	Eliteserien	15	0	0	0	15	0
Sarpsborg 08	Total		21	0	6	0	27	0
Mjøndalen (loan)	2025	1. divisjon	26	0	5	0	31	0
Career total			47	0	11	0	58	0
