= 2026 Stabæk Fotball season =

Stabæk
2026 season
- Chairman: Jonas Benkow
- Head coach: Kjell André Thu
- Stadium: Nadderud Stadion
- 1. divisjon: 5th
- 2026–27 Norwegian Cup: Pre-season
- Top goalscorer: League: Magnus Lankhof Dahlby (6); All: Magnus Lankhof Dahlby (6)
Home colours	Away colours

The 2026 season is the 114th season in the history of Stabæk Fotball and the third consecutive season in the Norwegian First Division. In addition, Stabæk will participate in the 2026–27 Norwegian Football Cup.

== Transfers ==
=== In ===
Pos.	Player	Transferred from	Fee	Date	Source
MF	(Norway) Brage Tobiassen	(Norway) Grorud	Loan return	31 December 2025	
MF	(Norway) Oscar Solnørdal	(Norway) Brattvåg		7 January 2026	
GK	(Norway) Marius Ulla	(Norway) Hødd		20 January 2026	
DF	(Norway) Eirik Lereng	(Norway) Åsane		16 February 2026	
FW	(The Gambia) Alagie Sanyang	(Norway) Sarpsborg 08		12 March 2026	
MF	(Norway) Jacob Hanstad	(Norway) Sandefjord		31 March 2026	

=== Out ===
Pos.	Player	Transferred to	Fee	Date	Source
DF	(Norway) Martin Hellan	(Norway) Brann	Loan return	31 December 2025	
MF	(Ghana) Emmanuel Danso	(Scotland) Livingston		1 January 2026	
DF	(Denmark) Mads Nielsen	Retired		1 January 2026	
FW	(Norway) Kristian Opseth			1 January 2026	
DF	(Denmark) Kasper Pedersen			1 January 2026	
FW	(Norway) Rasmus Eggen Vinge	(Norway) KFUM Oslo	Undisclosed	4 January 2026	
FW	(Norway) Abel Cedergren	(Czech Republic) SK Slavia Prague B	>20,000,000 kr	5 January 2026	
MF	(Norway) Jesper Isaksen	(Norway) Kristiansund		5 January 2026	
FW	(Mali) Bassekou Diabaté	(Belarus) FC Maxline Vitebsk		22 January 2026	
DF	(Norway) Aleksander Andresen	(Norway) Fredrikstad		30 January 2026	

== Pre-season and friendlies ==
23 January 2026	Stabæk (Norway)	3–0	(Norway) Bærum

31 January 2026	Grorud (Norway)	1–2	(Norway) Stabæk

6 February 2026	Lillestrøm (Norway)	1–3	(Norway) Stabæk

14 February 2026	IFK Göteborg (Sweden)	4–2	(Norway) Stabæk

22 February 2026	Stabæk (Norway)	5–2	(Norway) Ranheim

26 February 2026	Sandefjord (Norway)	2–1	(Norway) Stabæk

6 March 2026	Stabæk (Norway)	1–0	(Norway) Sogndal

13 March 2026	Stabæk (Norway)	1–1	(Norway) Egersund

21 March 2026	Stabæk (Norway)	2–3	(Norway) Kongsvinger

29 March 2026	Stabæk (Norway)	2–0	(Norway) Moss

== Competitions ==
=== Overall record ===
Competition	First match	Last match	Starting round	Record							
Competition	First match	Last match	Starting round	Pld	W	D	L	GF	GA	GD	Win %
2026 Norwegian First Division	5 April 2026		Matchday 1	11	6	3	2	25	13	+12	54.55
2026–27 Norwegian Football Cup				0	0	0	0	0	0	+0	—
Total				11	6	3	2	25	13	+12	54.55

Source: Competitions

=== First Division ===
Pos	Team	Pld	W	D	L	GF	GA	GD	Pts	Promotion, qualification or relegation
3	Haugesund	10	7	1	2	30	17	+13	22	Qualification for the promotion play-offs third round
4	Odd	10	7	1	2	23	12	+11	22	Qualification for the promotion play-offs second round
5	Stabæk	10	5	3	2	22	12	+10	18	Qualification for the promotion play-offs first round
6	Ranheim	9	5	1	3	26	18	+8	16	Qualification for the promotion play-offs first round
7	Hødd	10	4	2	4	13	13	0	14	

Updated to match(es) played on 31 May 2026. Source: OBOS-ligaen (in Norwegian)
Rules for classification: 1) Points; 2) Goal difference; 3) Goals scored; 4) Head-to-head points; 5) Head-to-head goal difference; 6) Head-to-head goals scored.

==== Results summary ====
Overall								Home						Away					
Pld	W	D	L	GF	GA	GD	Pts	W	D	L	GF	GA	GD	W	D	L	GF	GA	GD
0	0	0	0	0	0	0	0	0	0	0	0	0	0	0	0	0	0	0	0

==== Results by round ====
Round	1	2	3	4	5	6	7	8	9	10
Ground	A	H	A	H	A	A	H	A	H	A
Result	L	W	D	W	W	W	L	D	W	
Position										

A = Away; H = Home; W = Win; D = Draw; L = Loss

==== Matches ====
The fixtures schedule was released on 19 December 2025.

5 April 2026 1	Strømsgodset	2–1	Stabæk

12 April 2026 2	Stabæk	4–0	Åsane

19 April 2026 3	Odd	2–2	Stabæk

26 April 2026 4	Stabæk	3–2	Haugesund

1 May 2026 5	Lyn	0–4	Stabæk

10 May 2026 6	Sandnes Ulf	0–1	Stabæk

16 May 2026 7	Stabæk	1–2	Raufoss

20 May 2026 8	Sogndal	2–2	Stabæk

25 May 2026 9	Stabæk	2–0	Kongsvinger

30 May 2026 10	Moss	2–2	Stabæk	Moss
16:00				Stadium: Melløs Stadion

14 June 2026 11	Stabæk	3–1	Egersund	Bekkestua
16:00				Stadium: New Nadderud Stadium

=== Norwegian Football Cup ===
22–23 August 2026 First round	Heming	v	Stabæk
