= Boubacar Konté =

Malian footballer

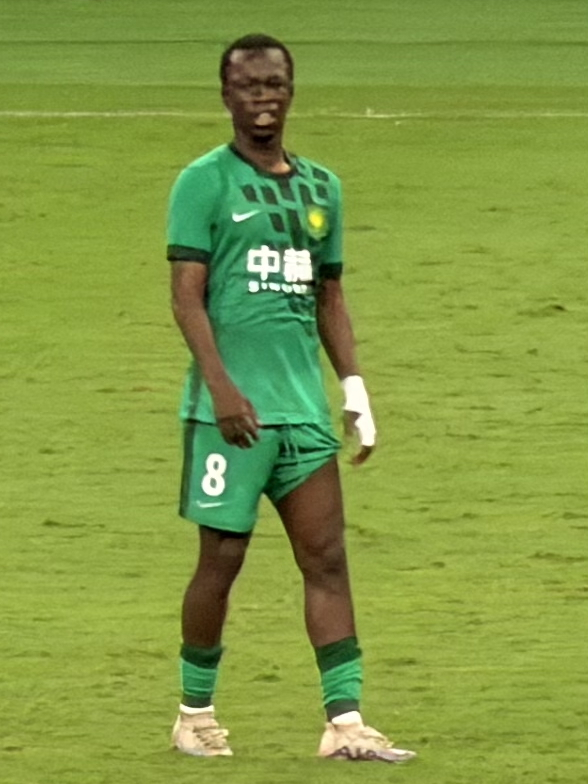
- Konté in 2026

Personal information
- Full name: Aboubacar Dit Boubou Konté
- Date of birth: 2 March 2001 (age 25)
- Place of birth: Mali
- Height: 1.75 m (5 ft 9 in)
- Positions: Midfielder; forward

Team information
- Current team: Beijing Guoan
- Number: 8

Youth career
- –2019: Etoiles Mandé

Senior career*
Years	Team	Apps	(Gls)
2019–2023	Sarpsborg 08	11	(0)
2019–2020	→ Nordsjælland (loan)	0	(0)
2021	→ Jerv (loan)	13	(0)
2021–2022	→ Nacional (loan)	4	(0)
2023	Fredrikstad	23	(1)
2024–2025	Dila	70	(12)
2026–	Beijing Guoan	26	(0)

International career^{‡}
2019	Mali U20	9	(2)
- * Club domestic league appearances and goals as of 10:30, 8 November 2026 (UTC) ‡ National team caps and goals as of 18:18, 27 July 2020 (UTC)

Aboubacar Dit Boubou Konté (born 2 March 2001) is a Malian footballer who plays as a midfielder or forward for Chinese Super League club Beijing Guoan.

== Career ==
On 11 March 2019, Sarpsborg 08 announced the signing of Konté to a four-year contract.

On 27 August 2021, he joined Nacional in Portugal on loan.

In January 2024, Konté signed with Erovnuli Liga club Dila. On 10 December 2025, he would score the final goal to win the Georgian Cup against Iberia 1999 in a 3–1 victory to lift the trophy. He would later win the Georgian Super Cup with Dila.

On 24 February 2026, Konté joined Chinese Super League side Beijing Guoan, opting to bear the number 8.

== Career statistics ==
=== Club ===
As of match played 8 November 2026.

Appearances and goals by club, season and competition
Club	Season	League			Cup		Continental		Other		Total	
Club	Season	Division	Apps	Goals	Apps	Goals	Apps	Goals	Apps	Goals	Apps	Goals
Sarpsborg 08	2019	Eliteserien	1	0	1	0	—		—		2	0
Sarpsborg 08	2020	Eliteserien	7	0	0	0	—		—		7	0
Sarpsborg 08	2022	Eliteserien	4	0	0	0	—		—		4	0
Sarpsborg 08	Total		12	0	1	0	—		—		13	0
Nordsjælland (loan)	2019–20	Danish Superliga	0	0	0	0	—		—		0	0
Jerv (loan)	2021	1. divisjon	13	0	2	0	—		—		15	0
Nacional (loan)	2021–22	Liga Portugal 2	4	0	1	0	—		—		5	0
Fredrikstad	2023	1. divisjon	23	1	3	0	—		—		26	1
Dila	2024	Erovnuli Liga	35	4	1	1	—		—		36	5
Dila	2025	Erovnuli Liga	35	8	4	1	4	1	2	0	45	10
Dila	Total		70	12	5	2	4	1	2	0	81	15
Beijing Guoan	2026	Chinese Super League	26	0	1	0	3	0	1	0	31	0
Career total			158	13	13	2	7	1	3	0	181	16

== 2Honours ==
Dila Gori

- Georgian Super Cup, 2025
- Georgian Cup: 2025

Beijing Guoan

- Chinese FA Super Cup: 2026

Mali U20

- U-20 Africa Cup of Nations: 2019
