= Laurent Mendy (footballer, born 2001) =

Senegalese footballer

Personal information
- Full name: Laurent Jacques Mendy
- Date of birth: 27 November 2001 (age 24)
- Position: Midfielder

Youth career
- Oslo FA

Senior career*
Years	Team	Apps	(Gls)
2021–2023	Sarpsborg 08	4	(0)
2021	→ Strømmen (loan)	8	(0)
2022–2023	→ Oslo FA (loan)		
2023–2025	Moss FK	17	(0)
- * Club domestic league appearances and goals as of 22 April 2025

Laurent Jacques Mendy (born 27 November 2001) is a Senegalese football midfielder. Until 2025, he played for Moss FK.

Mendy made his Eliteserien debut in July 2021 against Vålerenga.
