= Simen Vidtun Nilsen =

Norwegian footballer (born 2000)

Personal information
- Date of birth: 3 March 2000 (age 26)
- Height: 1.91 m (6 ft 3 in)
- Position: Goalkeeper

Team information
- Current team: Brann
- Number: 12

Youth career
- –2017: Tistedalen
- 2018–2020: Sarpsborg 08

Senior career*
Years	Team	Apps	(Gls)
2018	Tistedalen	6	(0)
2020–2023	Sarpsborg 08	11	(0)
2023	→ Skeid (loan)	28	(0)
2024–2026	Ranheim	59	(0)
2026–	Brann	12	(0)
- * Club domestic league appearances and goals as of 1 November 2026

Simen Vidtun Nilsen (born 3 March 2000) is a Norwegian football goalkeeper who currently plays for Brann.

Nilsen hails from Tistedal and made his senior debut for Tistedalen in the 2018 Norwegian Fourth Division. In mid-2018 he joined Sarpsborg 08 as a youth player. He was drafted into the senior team in 2020. However, he did not play matches in any competition in 2020 due to the COVID-19-related lockdowns of football in Norway.

Nilsen made his Sarpsborg 08 debut in the 2021 Norwegian Football Cup against Kvik Halden, followed by his Eliteserien debut in December 2021 against Brann.

Nilsen won the spot as Sarpsborg 08's first-choice goalkeeper in the summer of 2022, when Anders Kristiansen sustained a thumb injury. Nilsen was placed in the starting eleven against Aalesund only 15 minutes before the game started, but continued playing in the following months. Nilsen also penned a new contract until the summer of 2025. In July 2022, Nilsen was sent off, this time paving the way for Leander Øy's debut.

In 2023, Sarpsborg 08 did not favor starting with Nilsen, and sent him on loan to Skeid for the entire 2023 1. divisjon campaign. While the team languishing in the bottom of the table, Nilsen gained experience as their near-undisputed first-choice goalkeeper. He was bought by another 1. divisjon team Ranheim ahead of the 2024 season.

== Career statistics ==
As of match played 1 November 2026

Appearances and goals by club, season and competition
Club	Season	League			Cup		Europe		Other		Total	
Club	Season	Division	Apps	Goals	Apps	Goals	Apps	Goals	Apps	Goals	Apps	Goals
Tistedalen	2018	Norwegian Fourth Division	6	0	—		—		—		6	0
Sarpsborg 08	2020	Eliteserien	0	0	—		—		—		0	0
Sarpsborg 08	2021	Eliteserien	1	0	2	0	—		—		3	0
Sarpsborg 08	2022	Eliteserien	10	0	2	1	—		—		12	1
Sarpsborg 08	Total		11	0	4	1	—		—		15	1
Skeid (loan)	2023	Norwegian First Division	28	0	—		—		—		28	0
Ranheim	2024	Norwegian First Division	29	0	0	0	—		—		29	0
Ranheim	2025	Norwegian First Division	30	0	3	0	—		1 (Note: Appearance in relegation play-offs)	0	34	0
Ranheim	Total		59	0	3	0	—		1	0	63	0
Brann	2026	Eliteserien	12	0	4	0	0	—		18	0	
Career total			116	0	11	1	2	0	1	0	130	1
