= Sarpsborg Stadion =

Football stadium in Sarpsborg, Norway

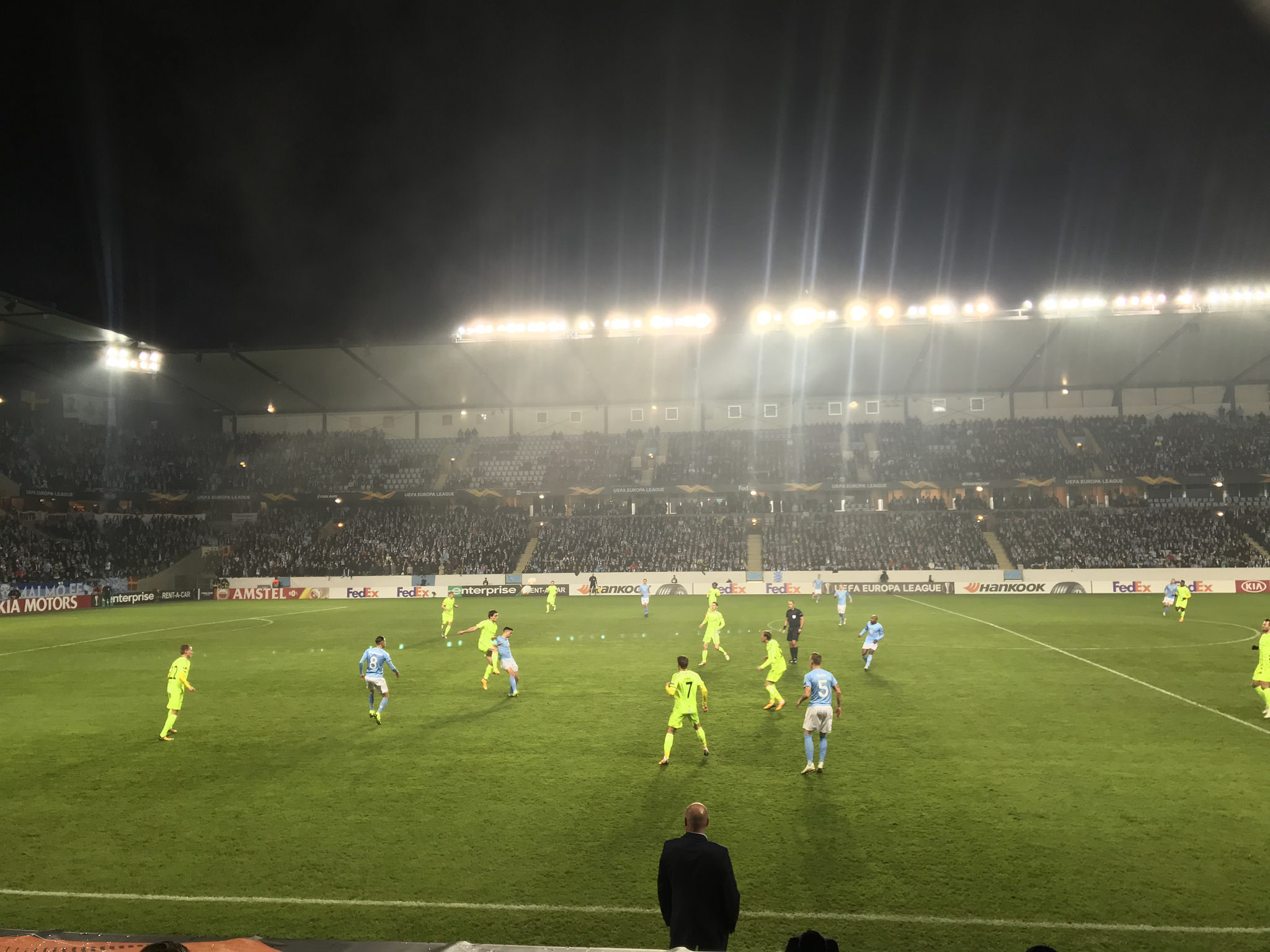
- Interactive map of Sarpsborg Stadion
- Location: Sarpsborg, Norway
- Coordinates: 59°17′10″N 11°5′51″E
- Operator: Sarpsborg municipality
- Capacity: 8,022
- Surface: Artificial turf
- Record attendance: 7042
- Field size: 105 m × 68 m (344 ft × 223 ft)

Construction
- Opened: 1930

Tenant
- Sarpsborg 08

The Sarpsborg Stadion is a football stadium in Sarpsborg, Norway. It is the home ground of Eliteserien club Sarpsborg 08.

The former multi-use venue hosted the Norwegian Athletics Championships in 1954 and 1960. The venue hosted one Norway national under-21 football team match, where Norway lost 1–3 against Sweden on 3 October 1972. The stadium has been repeatedly modernised in recent years; a modernisation which began in 2000, when a new main stand were built. In 2009, new floodlights were installed and the grass pitch was replaced with an artificial turf. New stands were built in both the south and north end of the pitch between 2010 and 2016. Sarpsborg 08's success in the 2018–19 UEFA Europa League led to further upgrades and improvements.

The stadium's attendance record dates from 14 October 1945, when Fredrikstad and Lyn met in the first of two replays of the final of the 1945 Norwegian Cup. 18,000 spectators visited the match that ended with a 1–1 draw. This was the penultimate Norwegian Cup final to be played outside Oslo.
