= Sulayman Bojang =

Norwegian-Gambian footballer (born 1997)

Personal information
- Full name: Sulayman Bojang
- Date of birth: 3 September 1997 (age 29)
- Place of birth: Oslo, Norway
- Height: 1.80 m (5 ft 11 in)
- Positions: Right back; left back

Team information
- Current team: Skeid
- Number: 11

Youth career
- Skeid

Senior career*
Years	Team	Apps	(Gls)
2017–2018	Skeid	19	(0)
2018–2021	Sarpsborg 08	35	(0)
2019	→ Kongsvinger (loan)	10	(0)
2021–2022	Haugesund	2	(0)
2022–	Skeid	89	(4)

International career^{‡}
2019–	Gambia	6	(0)
- * Club domestic league appearances and goals as of 15 November 2026 ‡ National team caps and goals as of 15:51, 15 June 2019 (UTC)

Sulayman Bojang (born 3 September 1997) is a professional footballer who plays for Skeid. Born in Norway, he represents Gambia internationally.

== Club career ==
On 13 August 2018, Sarpsborg 08 announced the signing of Bojang, from Skeid on a 3.5-year contract.

== International career ==
In June 2019, Bojang was selected for the Gambian national football team and got his debut for the country on 8 June 2019 against Guinea, which they won 1-0 with Bojang on the left back for the whole game. He played his second game four days later against Morocco.

=== Career statistics ===
As of match played 28 August 2021

Appearances and goals by club, season and competition
Club	Season	League			National Cup		Continental		Other		Total	
Club	Season	Division	Apps	Goals	Apps	Goals	Apps	Goals	Apps	Goals	Apps	Goals
Skeid	2017	2. divisjon	4	0	0	0	-		-		4	0
Skeid	2018	2. divisjon	15	0	2	0	-		-		17	0
Skeid	Total		19	0	2	0	-	-	-	-	21	0
Sarpsborg 08	2018	Eliteserien	1	0	2	0	–		–		3	0
Sarpsborg 08	2020	Eliteserien	24	0	0	0	–		–		24	0
Sarpsborg 08	2021	Eliteserien	10	0	2	0	–		–		12	0
Sarpsborg 08	Total		35	0	4	0	-	-	-	-	39	0
Kongsvinger (loan)	2019	OBOS-ligaen	10	0	1	0	–		–		11	0
Haugesund	2021	Eliteserien	1	0	0	0	–		–		1	0
Career total			65	0	7	0	-	-	-	-	72	0
