= Anwar Elyounossi =

Norwegian footballer (born 1999)

Anwar Elyounoussi
Personal information
- Date of birth: 29 March 1999 (age 27)
- Place of birth: Sarpsborg, Norway
- Height: 1.78 m (5 ft 10 in)
- Position: Right-back

Team information
- Current team: Kvik Halden

Youth career
- –2014: Sarpsborg

Senior career*
Years	Team	Apps	(Gls)
2014	Sarpsborg	5	(0)
2015–2019	Sarpsborg 08 2	66	(32)
2018–2020	Sarpsborg 08	11	(0)
2019	→ Fram (loan)	10	(0)
2021–2022	Botev Plovdiv	1	(0)
2021–2022	→ Fremad Amager (loan)	10	(0)
2022–2024	Kvik Halden	43	(1)
2024–	Sparta Sarpsborg	0	(0)
- * Club domestic league appearances and goals as of 1 December 2023

Anwar Elyounoussi (born 29 March 1999) is a Norwegian professional footballer who plays as a right-back for Norwegian club Kvik Halden. He has also previously played for Sarpsborg 08 in Norway, Botev Plovdiv in Bulgaria and Fremad Amager in Denmark.

== Career ==
He started his career in Sarpsborg and also made his senior debut there, at the fifth tier, before joining Sarpsborg 08's youth setup ahead of the 2015 season. He signed for the senior team and made his senior debut in the 2018 Norwegian Football Cup, but did not make his league debut until 2019. In the autumn of 2019 he was loaned out to third-tiers Fram.

Elyounoussi left Sarpsborg 08 at the end of 2020. On 23 February 2021, Elyounoussi signed with Bulgarian club Botev Plovdiv. However, he only played one minute from February to July. To get more playing time, he was loaned out to Danish 1st Division club Fremad Amager on 7 July 2021 for the 2020-21 season. The Danish club had the same owners as Botev Plovdiv. However, after Fremad Amager was sold at the end of 2021, the club announced on 17 February 2022, that Elyounoussi was one of several players who had left the club.

== Personal life ==
He is a younger brother of Mohamed Elyounoussi and first cousin of Tarik Elyounoussi.
