= Joachim Thomassen =

Norwegian footballer (born 1988)

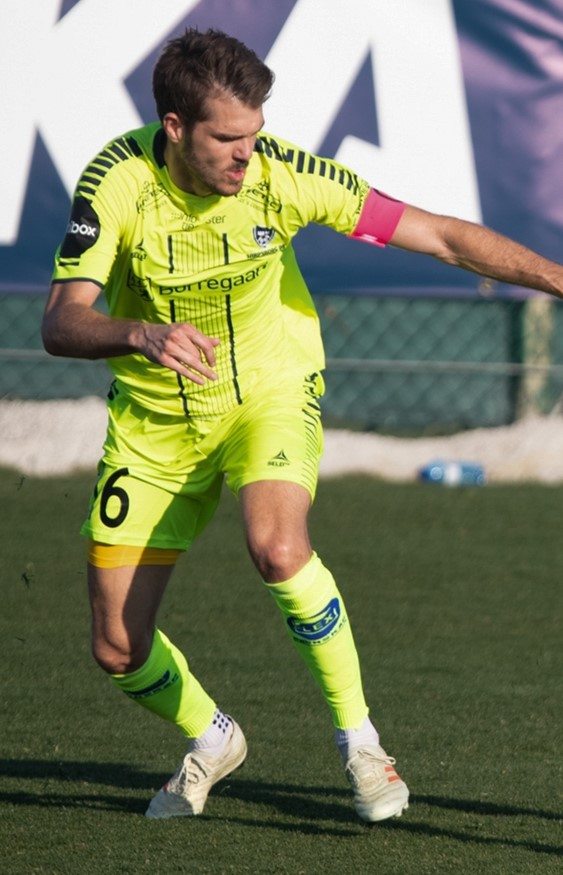

Personal information
- Full name: Joachim Thomassen
- Date of birth: 4 May 1988 (age 38)
- Place of birth: Sarpsborg, Norway
- Height: 1.80 m (5 ft 11 in)
- Position: Left back

Senior career*
Years	Team	Apps	(Gls)
2007	Sparta Sarpsborg	8	(1)
2008–2012	Fredrikstad	91	(4)
2012–2014	Vålerenga	29	(0)
2014–2023	Sarpsborg 08	193	(9)

International career
2005	Norway U17	8	(0)
2007	Norway U19	1	(0)
2009	Norway U21	10	(0)
- * Club domestic league appearances and goals as of 13 November 2022

Joachim Thomassen (born 4 May 1988) is a former Norwegian footballer.

== Club ==
Thomassen started his youth career with Sarpsborg FK before joining Sparta Sarpsborg in 2007. In January 2008, he joined Fredrikstad and played his first game for the club against Kongsvinger. In May 2009, he signed a contract extension for Fredrikstad until 2012. In November 2011, he was rumored to join the Seattle Sounders FC of Major League Soccer. Before the 2012 season, he signed a contract with Vålerenga. After two seasons with Vålerenga he signed for Sarpsborg 08 FF ahead of the 2014 season.

== Career statistics ==
=== Club ===
As of match played 8 October 2022

Appearances and goals by club, season and competition
Club	Season	League			National Cup		Continental		Total	
Club	Season	Division	Apps	Goals	Apps	Goals	Apps	Goals	Apps	Goals
Sarpsborg 08	2007	Adeccoligaen	8	1	0	0	-		8	1
Sarpsborg 08	Total		8	1	0	0	-	-	8	1
Fredrikstad	2008	Tippeligaen	14	0	4	0	-		0	
Fredrikstad	2009	Tippeligaen	24	0	4	1	2	0	30	1
Fredrikstad	2010	Adeccoligaen	26	2	3	0	-		29	2
Fredrikstad	2011	Tippeligaen	27	2	5	1	-		32	3
Fredrikstad	Total		91	4	16	2	2	0	109	6
Vålerenga	2012	Tippeligaen	18	0	3	0	-		21	0
Vålerenga	2013	Tippeligaen	11	0	1	0	-		12	0
Vålerenga	Total		29	0	4	0	-	-	33	0
Sarpsborg 08	2014	Tippeligaen	19	1	4	0	-		23	1
Sarpsborg 08	2015	Tippeligaen	5	0	2	0	-		7	0
Sarpsborg 08	2016	Tippeligaen	28	1	1	0	-		29	1
Sarpsborg 08	2017	Eliteserien	26	1	6	0	-		32	1
Sarpsborg 08	2018	Eliteserien	27	2	1	0	13	0	41	2
Sarpsborg 08	2019	Eliteserien	27	1	3	0	-		30	1
Sarpsborg 08	2020	Eliteserien	24	0	0	0	-		24	0
Sarpsborg 08	2021	Eliteserien	27	3	2	0	-		29	3
Sarpsborg 08	2022	Eliteserien	10	0	2	0	-		12	0
Sarpsborg 08	Total		193	9	21	0	13	0	227	9
Career total			321	14	41	2	15	0	377	16

== International ==
Thomassen has played for the Norway national under-17 football team, Under-19 team, and Under -21 team.
