= Pablo Arboine =

Costa Rican football player (born 1998)

Personal information
- Full name: Pablo Cesar Arboine Carmona
- Date of birth: 3 April 1998 (age 28)
- Place of birth: Guápiles, Costa Rica
- Height: 1.78 m (5 ft 10 in)
- Position: Centre back

Team information
- Current team: Deportivo Saprissa)
- Number: 3

Senior career*
Years	Team	Apps	(Gls)
2016–2019	Santos de Guápiles	57	(6)
2019–2020	Sarpsborg 08	0	(0)
2019	→ HB Køge (loan)	0	(0)
2020	→ San Carlos (loan)	24	(0)
2021–2022	Santos de Guápiles	57	(4)
2022–	Deportivo Saprissa	121	(3)
2025	→ Sporting (loan)	12	(0)

International career^{‡}
2015	Costa Rica U17	6	(0)
2016–2017	Costa Rica U20	9	(0)
2018	Costa Rica U21	3	(0)
2019	Costa Rica U23	2	(0)
2019–	Costa Rica	9	(0)
- * Club domestic league appearances and goals as of 27 May 2026 ‡ National team caps and goals as of 24 March 2024

Pablo Cesar Arboine Carmona (born 3 April 1998) is a Costa Rican professional footballer who plays for Deportivo Saprissa. Besides Costa Rica, he has played in Norway and Denmark.

== Career ==
Arboine made his debut for the senior Costa Rica national football team at the Avaya Stadium on the 2 February 2019 against the United States.

In August 2019, Arboine was loaned out from Sarpsborg 08 FF to Danish 1st Division club HB Køge. Having only played one game for the club, he left by the end of the year and immediately joined A.D. San Carlos on loan with an option to buy.
