= Jonathan Lindseth =

Norwegian footballer (born 1996)

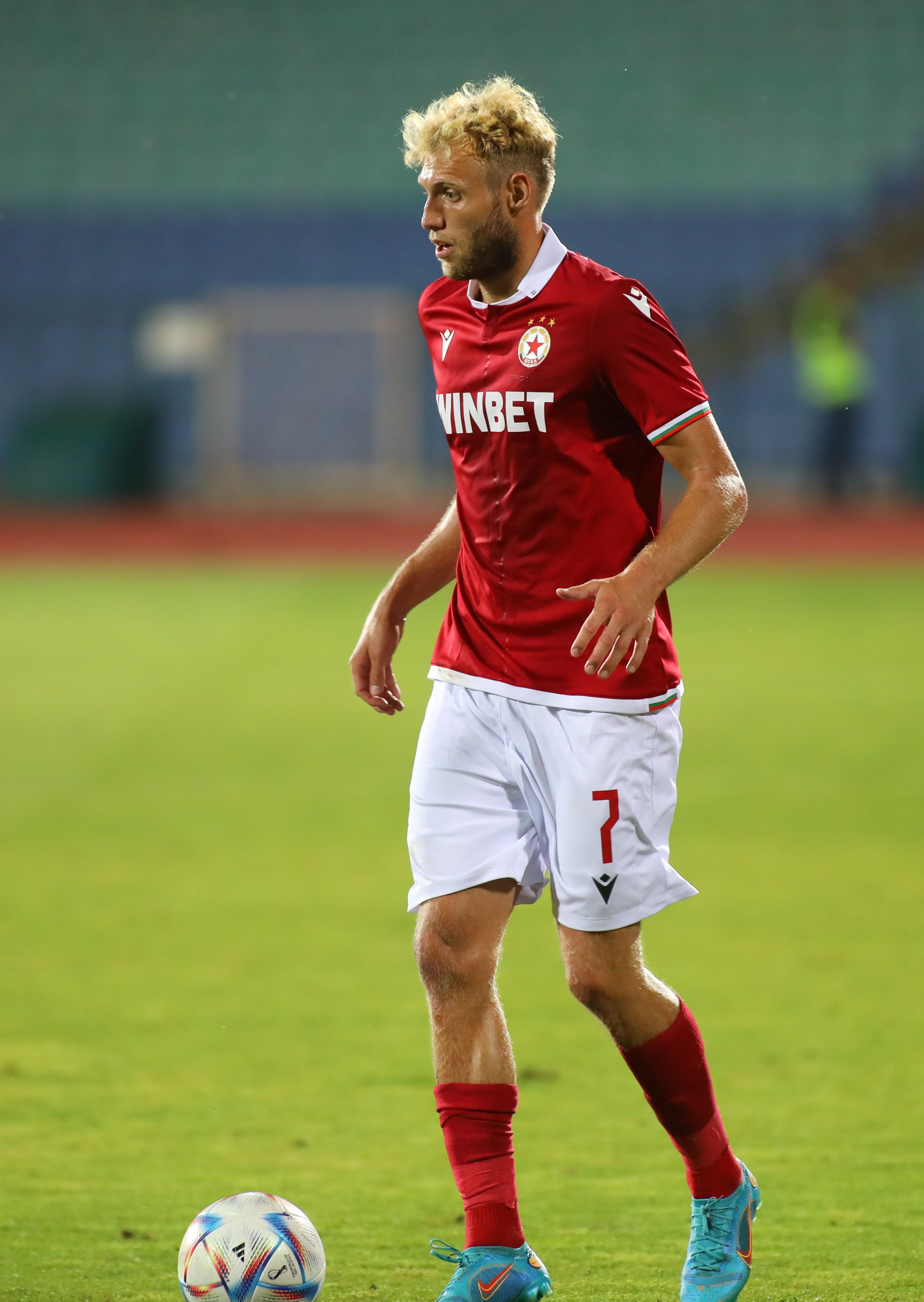
- Lindseth with CSKA Sofia in 2022

Personal information
- Full name: Jonathan Lindseth
- Date of birth: 25 February 1996 (age 30)
- Place of birth: Porsgrunn, Norway
- Height: 1.82 m (6 ft 0 in)
- Position: Midfielder

Team information
- Current team: Manisa
- Number: 10

Senior career*
Years	Team	Apps	(Gls)
2014–2015	Odd	0	(0)
2016–2019	Mjøndalen	86	(9)
2019–2022	Sarpsborg 08	94	(18)
2022–2025	CSKA Sofia	96	(13)
2025–	Manisa	36	(1)
- * Club domestic league appearances and goals as of 6 May 2026

Jonathan Lindseth (born 25 February 1996) is a Norwegian professional footballer who plays as a midfielder for Turkish club Manisa.

== Career statistics ==
=== Club ===
As of match played 21 March 2026.

Appearances and goals by club, season and competition
Club	Season	League			National Cup		Europe		Other		Total	
Club	Season	Division	Apps	Goals	Apps	Goals	Apps	Goals	Apps	Goals	Apps	Goals
Odd	2014	Eliteserien	0	0	1	0	—		—		1	0
Odd	2015	Eliteserien	0	0	3	5	—		—		3	5
Odd	Total		0	0	4	5	0	0	0	0	4	5
Mjøndalen	2016	Norwegian First Division	29	6	1	1	—		1	0	31	7
Mjøndalen	2017	Norwegian First Division	28	1	5	2	—		2	0	35	3
Mjøndalen	2018	Norwegian First Division	29	2	4	1	—		—		33	3
Mjøndalen	Total		86	9	10	4	0	0	3	0	99	13
Sarpsborg 08	2019	Eliteserien	28	3	3	0	—		—		31	3
Sarpsborg 08	2020	Eliteserien	26	3	0	0	—		—		26	3
Sarpsborg 08	2021	Eliteserien	25	10	4	0	—		—		29	10
Sarpsborg 08	2022	Eliteserien	15	2	1	0	—		—		16	2
Sarpsborg 08	Total		94	18	8	0	0	0	0	0	102	18
CSKA Sofia	2022–23	First League	29	2	3	0	4	0	—		36	2
CSKA Sofia	2023–24	First League	34	9	5	1	2	0	1	0	42	10
CSKA Sofia	2024–25	First League	33	2	5	0	—		—		38	2
CSKA Sofia	Total		96	13	13	1	6	0	1	0	116	14
Manisa	2025–26	TFF First League	31	1	0	0	—		—		31	1
Career total			307	41	35	10	6	0	4	0	341	51
