= 2013 Stabæk Fotball season =

Stabæk
2013 season
- Chairman: Espen Moe
- Manager: Petter Belsvik
- Stadium: Nadderud Stadion
- 1. divisjon: 2nd
- Norwegian Cup: Fourth Round vs Start
- Top goalscorer: League: Mads Stokkelien (17); All: Mads Stokkelien (23)

The 2013 season was Stabæk's 1st season back in the Norwegian First Division following their relegation in from the Tippeligaen in 2012. It was their second season with Petter Belsvik as their manager, in which they finished second in the league, earning promotion back to the Tippeligaen, and reached the Fourth Round of the Cup.

== Squad ==
Note: Flags indicate national team as defined under FIFA eligibility rules; some limited exceptions apply. Players may hold more than one non-FIFA nationality.

No.	Pos.	Nation	Player
1	GK	CIV	Sayouba Mandé
2	DF	DEN	Timmi Johansen
3	DF	DEN	Thor Søndergaard Lange
4	DF	NOR	Nicolai Næss
5	DF	NOR	Jørgen Hammer
6	FW	NOR	Fredrik Brustad
7	MF	NOR	Martin Andresen
8	FW	NOR	Stian Sortevik
9	FW	NOR	Chuma Anene (On loan from Vålerenga)
10	MF	LBN	Adnan Haidar
11	FW	CIV	Franck Boli
12	GK	NOR	Simen Omholt Jensen

No.	Pos.	Nation	Player
13	DF	NOR	Bjarte Haugsdal
14	MF	NOR	Herman Stengel
15	DF	FIN	Ville Jalasto
16	MF	NOR	Morten Thorsby
18	FW	NOR	Mads Stokkelien
19	FW	NOR	Marco Hjorth
21	MF	NOR	Daniel Granli
22	GK	NOR	Jonathan Rasheed
25	MF	NOR	Erik Benjaminsen
27	MF	NOR	Eirik Haugstad
28	MF	CIV	Luc Kassi
81	MF	NOR	Anders Trondsen

== Transfers ==
=== Winter ===
In: Note: Flags indicate national team as defined under FIFA eligibility rules; some limited exceptions apply. Players may hold more than one non-FIFA nationality.

No.	Pos.	Nation	Player
2	DF	DEN	Timmi Johansen (from (Denmark) OB)
4	DF	NOR	Nicolai Næss (from (Norway) Vålerenga)
7	MF	NOR	Martin Andresen (from (Norway) Follo)

Out: Note: Flags indicate national team as defined under FIFA eligibility rules; some limited exceptions apply. Players may hold more than one non-FIFA nationality.

No.	Pos.	Nation	Player
2	DF	ISL	Bjarni Ólafur Eiríksson (to (Iceland) Valur)
3	DF	ISL	Elfar Freyr Helgason (to (Denmark) Randers)
4	DF	USA	Sean Cunningham (loan return to (Norway) Molde)
7	FW	NOR	Torstein Andersen Aase (to (Norway) KFUM Oslo)
20	FW	ISL	Veigar Páll Gunnarsson (to (Iceland) Stjarnan)
21	FW	NOR	Abdurahim Laajab (loan return to (Norway) Vålerenga)
22	GK	NOR	Jan Kjell Larsen
22	MF	NOR	David Hanssen (Retired)
81	MF	NOR	Christer Kleiven (to (Norway) Odd)

=== Summer ===
In: Note: Flags indicate national team as defined under FIFA eligibility rules; some limited exceptions apply. Players may hold more than one non-FIFA nationality.

No.	Pos.	Nation	Player
9	FW	NOR	Chuma Anene (loan from (Norway) Vålerenga)

Out: Note: Flags indicate national team as defined under FIFA eligibility rules; some limited exceptions apply. Players may hold more than one non-FIFA nationality.

No.	Pos.	Nation	Player

== Competitions ==
=== 1. divisjon ===
==== Results summary ====
Overall								Home						Away					
Pld	W	D	L	GF	GA	GD	Pts	W	D	L	GF	GA	GD	W	D	L	GF	GA	GD
30	14	10	6	51	46	+5	52	9	5	1	30	19	+11	5	5	5	21	27	−6

==== Results by round ====
Round	1	2	3	4	5	6	7	8	9	10	11	12	13	14	15	16	17	18	19	20	21	22	23	24	25	26	27	28	29	30
Ground	A	H	A	A	H	A	H	A	H	A	H	A	H	A	H	A	H	A	H	H	A	H	A	H	A	H	A	H	A	H
Result	D	D	D	L	D	W	W	L	W	W	W	L	W	D	D	W	L	W	W	W	W	W	L	W	D	W	L	D	D	D
Position	6	10	11	13	11	10	8	11	8	7	6	9	9	7	8	7	8	6	4	3	2	2	2	2	2	2	2	2	2	2

Updated to match(es) played on 3 November 2013. Source: see below
A = Away; H = Home; W = Win; D = Draw; L = Loss

==== Results ====
6 April 2013 1	HamKam	2–2	Stabæk	Hamar
15:30 CEST (UTC+2)	E.Dahle 22'; O.Lie 64'	Summary	Boli 61'; Brustad 90'	Stadium: Briskeby Arena; Attendance: 2,387; Referee: Kai Erik Steen

13 April 2013 2	Stabæk	0–0	Kristiansund	Bærum
15:30 CEST (UTC+2)		Summary		Stadium: Nadderud Stadion; Attendance: 3,221; Referee: Ole Gya

20 April 2013 3	Kongsvinger	2–2	Stabæk	Kongsvinger
15:30 CEST (UTC+2)	Johannesen 45', 72' (pen.)	Summary	Stokkelien 35' (pen.); Sortevik (red card) 51'; Boli 67'	Stadium: Gjemselund Stadion; Attendance: 1,284; Referee: Kai Erik Steen

28 April 2013 4	Hødd	1–0	Stabæk	Ulsteinvik
18:00 CEST (UTC+2)	F.Aursnes 51'	Summary		Stadium: Høddvoll Stadion; Attendance: 1,452; Referee: Jan Tennøy

4 May 2013 5	Stabæk	2–2	Bryne	Bærum
15:30 CEST (UTC+2)	Johansen 38'; Kassi 75'	Summary	Tveita 52', 53'	Stadium: Nadderud Stadion; Attendance: 2,330; Referee: Petter Toppe

9 May 2013 6	Follo	2–3	Stabæk	Ski
18:00 CEST (UTC+2)	Jalasto 5' (o.g.); Tveter 11'	Summary	Stokkelien 25'; Brustad 42', 71'	Stadium: Ski Stadion; Attendance: 629; Referee: Anders Gjermshus

12 May 2013 7	Stabæk	2–0	Mjøndalen	Bærum
15:00 CEST (UTC+2)	Trondsen 49'; Boli 61'	Summary		Stadium: Nadderud Stadion; Attendance: 2,353; Referee: Mads Ahlsen

16 May 2013 8	Fredrikstad	4–0	Stabæk	Fredrikstad
20:05 CEST (UTC+2)	S.Standerholen 10'; Anier 59', 62'; Stene 61'	Summary		Stadium: Fredrikstad Stadion; Attendance: 4,790; Referee: Ole Gya

20 May 2013 9	Stabæk	1–0	Ullensaker/Kisa	Bærum
15:30 CEST (UTC+2)	Stokkelien 90' (pen.)	Summary		Stadium: Nadderud Stadion; Attendance: 2,383; Referee: Kai Erik Steen

26 May 2013 10	Elverum	3–4	Stabæk	Elverum
18:00 CEST (UTC+2)	M.Brekke 10', 47'; K.Bråtebæk 76' (pen.)	Summary	Trondsen 19'; Boli 34', 54'; Stokkelien 89'	Stadium: Sentralidrettsplassen; Attendance: 694; Referee: Kim Rune Osterlie Borgersen

9 June 2013 11	Stabæk	4–1	Ranheim	Bærum
18:00 CEST (UTC+2)	Brustad 17'; Sortevik 28'; Boli 63'; Trondsen 81'	Summary	Aas 69'	Stadium: Nadderud Stadion; Attendance: 2,245; Referee: Andres Gjermshus

16 June 2013 12	Bodø/Glimt	2–1	Stabæk	Bodø
18:00 CEST (UTC+2)	Johansen 19', 62'	Summary	Brustad 21'	Stadium: Aspmyra Stadion; Attendance: 2,821; Referee: Kai Erik Steen

23 June 2013 13	Stabæk	2–1	Strømmen	Bærum
18:00 CEST (UTC+2)	Haugsdal 21'; Kassi 25'	Summary	M.Achrifi 83'	Stadium: Nadderud Stadion; Attendance: 2,091; Referee: Kjetil Hansen

30 June 2013 14	Sandefjord	0–0	Stabæk	Sandefjord
18:00 CEST (UTC+2)		Summary		Stadium: Komplett.no Arena; Attendance: 2,436; Referee: Bjorn Hansen

6 July 2013 15	Stabæk	1–1	Vard Haugesund	Bærum
15:30 CEST (UTC+2)	Stokkelien 43'	Summary	Elvis 8'	Stadium: Nadderud Stadion; Attendance: 1,924; Referee: Jan Morten Tennøy

28 July 2013 16	Kristiansund	1–2	Stabæk	Kristiansund
18:00 CEST (UTC+2)	J.Mendy 75'	Summary	Stokkelien 12' (pen.), 82'	Stadium: Atlanten Stadion; Attendance: 1,970; Referee: Sigurd Kringstad

3 August 2013 17	Stabæk	1–5	HamKam	Bærum
15:30 CEST (UTC+2)	Haugsdal 42'	Summary	D.Bekkevold 7'; E.Dahle 36'; H.Aalmen 52'; V.Adebahr 72'; Gundersen 85'	Stadium: Nadderud Stadion; Attendance: 2,030; Referee: Kim Rune Osterlie Borgersen

11 August 2013 18	Strømmen	2–3	Stabæk	Strømmen
18:00 CEST (UTC+2)	Tokstad 50'; Hansen 74'	Summary	Kassi 32'; Anene 36'; Stokkelien 44'	Stadium: Strømmen Stadion; Attendance: 570; Referee: Kjetil Hansen

16 August 2013 19	Stabæk	2–1	Fredrikstad	Bærum
19:00 CEST (UTC+2)	Stokkelien 22'; Brustad 81'	Summary	Stene 75'	Stadium: Nadderud Stadion; Attendance: 1,949; Referee: Mathias Kringstad

25 August 2013 20	Stabæk	2–1	Hødd	Bærum
18:00 CEST (UTC+2)	Kassi 21'; Stokkelien 79'	Summary	Magnussen 10'	Stadium: Nadderud Stadion; Attendance: 2,267; Referee: Jan Morten Tennøy

2 September 2013 21	Bryne	1–2	Stabæk	Bryne
19:00 CEST (UTC+2)	Skartun 26'	Summary	Stokkelien 10', 46'	Stadium: Bryne Stadion; Attendance: 1,496; Referee: Casper Thorsøe Jr

15 September 2013 23	Ullensaker/Kisa	2–0	Stabæk	Ullensaker
18:00 CEST (UTC+2)	Giæver 11' (pen.); Duba 30'	Summary		Stadium: UKI Arena; Attendance: 643; Referee: Abders Gjermshus

18 September 2013 22	Stabæk	2–1	Follo	Bærum
18:30 CEST (UTC+2)	Anene 17'; Brustad 38'; Hammer (red card) 46'	Summary	T.Mjønner 41'	Stadium: Nadderud Stadion; Attendance: 1,855; Referee: Petter Toppe

22 September 2013 24	Stabæk	3–1	Kongsvinger	Bærum
18:00 CEST (UTC+2)	Anene 39'; Stokkelien 66'; Kassi 82'	Summary	M.Solum 77'	Stadium: Nadderud Stadion; Attendance: 2,089; Referee: Kristoffer Hagenes

29 September 2013 25	Mjøndalen	1–1	Stabæk	Mjøndalen
18:00 CEST (UTC+2)	V.Diomande 68'	Summary	Stokkelien 88'	Stadium: Mjøndalen Arena; Attendance: 1,201; Referee: Omar Rafiq

5 October 2013 26	Stabæk	4–1	Sandefjord	Bærum
15:30 CEST (UTC+2)	Amankwah 32' (o.g.); Jalasto 80'; Anene 88'; Kassi 90'	Summary	Brix 43'	Stadium: Nadderud Stadion; Attendance: 2,080; Referee: Mads Ahlsen

21 October 2013 28	Stabæk	3–3	Elverum	Bærum
19:00 CEST (UTC+2)	Stokkelien 20', 79'; Kassi 31'	Summary	K.Eriksen 24', 44', 88'	Stadium: Nadderud Stadion; Attendance: 2,103; Referee: Kristoffer Hagenes

24 October 2013 27	Vard Haugesund	3–0	Stabæk	Haugesund
18:30 CEST (UTC+2)	Kapidžić 28', 56'; A.Stølås 37'	Summary		Stadium: Haugesund Stadion; Attendance: 202; Referee: Christian Moen

27 October 2013 29	Ranheim	1–1	Stabæk	Trondheim
13:00 CET (UTC+01)	Aas 18'	Summary	D.Granli 70'	Stadium: DNB Arena; Attendance: 812; Referee: Anders Gjermshus

3 November 2013 30	Stabæk	1–1	Bodø/Glimt	Bærum
13:00 CET (UTC+01)	Valentin 68'	Summary	Stokkelien 57'	Stadium: Nadderud Stadion; Attendance: 4,006; Referee: Petter Toppe

==== Table ====
Pos	Team	Pld	W	D	L	GF	GA	GD	Pts	Promotion or relegation
1	Bodø/Glimt (C, P)	30	21	4	5	63	24	+39	67	Promotion to Tippeligaen
2	Stabæk (P)	30	14	10	6	51	46	+5	52	Promotion to Tippeligaen
3	Hødd	30	15	5	10	41	31	+10	50	Qualification for the promotion play-offs
4	Ranheim	30	14	7	9	49	38	+11	49	Qualification for the promotion play-offs
5	HamKam	30	14	6	10	49	43	+6	48	Qualification for the promotion play-offs

Source: nifs.no
Rules for classification: 1) points; 2) goal difference; 3) number of goals scored.
(C) Champions; (P) Promoted

=== Norwegian Cup ===
17 April 2013 First Round	Ørn-Horten	0–5	Stabæk	Horten
18:00 CEST (UTC+2)		Report	Stokkelien 54', 56', 65'; Boli 78', 89'	Stadium: Lystlunden; Referee: Raymond Nyberg

1 May 2013 Second Round	Kjelsås	3–4	Stabæk	Oslo
18:00 CEST (UTC+2)	Aoudia 41', 84'; Akinyemi 64'	Report	Stengel 47'; Sortevik 52'; Boli 54'; Stokkelien 69'	Stadium: Grefsen Stadion; Attendance: 503; Referee: Trygve Kjensli

30 May 2013 Third Round	Stabæk	3–1	Fredrikstad	Nadderud
18:00 CEST (UTC+2)	Brustad 56', 64'; Stokkelien 90'	Report	Solberg 35'	Stadium: Nadderud Stadion; Attendance: 922; Referee: Brage Sandmoen

19 June 2013 Fourth Round	Start	2–1	Stabæk	Kristiansand
18:00 CEST (UTC+2)	Acosta 32'; Jalasto 60' (o.g.)	Report	Brustad 37'	Stadium: Sør Arena; Attendance: 2,150; Referee: Svein Oddvar Moen

== Squad statistics ==
=== Appearances and goals ===
No.	Pos	Nat	Player	Total		Adeccoligaen		Norwegian Cup	
No.	Pos	Nat	Player	Apps	Goals	Apps	Goals	Apps	Goals
1	GK	(Ivory Coast) CIV	Sayouba Mandé	34	0	30+0	0	4+0	0
2	DF	(Denmark) DEN	Timmi Johansen	32	1	28+0	1	4+0	0
3	DF	(Denmark) DEN	Thor Søndergaard Lange	7	0	1+5	0	0+1	0
4	DF	(Norway) NOR	Nicolai Næss	24	0	12+9	0	2+1	0
5	DF	(Norway) NOR	Jørgen Hammer	26	0	23+1	0	2+0	0
6	FW	(Norway) NOR	Fredrik Brustad	29	10	21+5	7	3+0	3
7	MF	(Norway) NOR	Martin Andresen	1	0	0+1	0	0+0	0
8	FW	(Norway) NOR	Stian Sortevik	29	1	15+10	1	3+1	0
9	FW	(Norway) NOR	Chuma Anene	12	4	11+1	4	0+0	0
10	MF	(Lebanon) LBN	Adnan Haidar	20	0	9+10	0	1+0	0
11	FW	(Ivory Coast) CIV	Franck Boli	30	8	20+6	6	4+0	2
13	DF	(Norway) NOR	Bjarte Haugsdal	28	2	24+0	2	4+0	0
14	MF	(Norway) NOR	Herman Stengel	33	1	29+0	0	4+0	1
15	DF	(Finland) FIN	Ville Jalasto	32	1	28+0	1	4+0	0
16	MF	(Norway) NOR	Morten Thorsby	4	0	0+4	0	0+0	0
18	FW	(Norway) NOR	Mads Stokkelien	34	23	30+0	17	4+0	6
19	FW	(Norway) NOR	Marco Hjorth	4	0	0+3	0	0+1	0
21	MF	(Norway) NOR	Daniel Granli	17	1	7+9	1	0+1	0
27	MF	(Norway) NOR	Eirik Haugstad	3	0	0+2	0	0+1	0
28	MF	(Ivory Coast) CIV	Luc Kassi	28	7	16+10	7	1+1	0
81	MF	(Norway) NOR	Anders Trondsen	30	3	26+0	3	4+0	0
Players away from Stabæk on loan:
Players who appeared for Stabæk no longer at the club:

=== Goal scorers ===
Place	Position	Nation	Number	Name	Adeccoligaen	Norwegian Cup	Total
1	FW	(Norway)	18	Mads Stokkelien	17	6	23
2	FW	(Norway)	6	Fredrik Brustad	7	3	10
3	FW	(Ivory Coast)	11	Franck Boli	6	2	8
4	MF	(Ivory Coast)	28	Luc Kassi	7	0	7
5	FW	(Norway)	9	Chuma Anene	4	0	4
6	MF	(Norway)	81	Anders Trondsen	3	0	3
7	DF	(Norway)	13	Bjarte Haugsdal	2	0	2
7	MF	(Norway)	8	Stian Sortevik	1	1	2
9	MF	(Norway)	21	Daniel Granli	1	0	1
9	DF	(Denmark)	2	Timmi Johansen	1	0	1
9	DF	(Finland)	15	Ville Jalasto	1	0	1
9	MF	(Norway)	14	Herman Stengel	0	1	1
9				Own goal	1	0	1
				TOTALS	51	13	64

=== Disciplinary record ===
Number	Nation	Position	Name	Adeccoligaen		Norwegian Cup		Total	
Number	Nation	Position	Name	Yellow card	Red card	Yellow card	Red card	Yellow card	Red card
1	(Ivory Coast)	GK	Sayouba Mandé	1	0	1	0	2	0
2	(Denmark)	DF	Timmi Johansen	4	0	0	0	4	0
4	(Norway)	DF	Nicolai Næss	3	0	0	0	3	0
5	(Norway)	DF	Jørgen Hammer	1	1	0	0	1	1
6	(Norway)	FW	Fredrik Brustad	1	0	0	0	1	0
8	(Norway)	FW	Stian Sortevik	0	1	0	0	0	1
11	(Ivory Coast)	FW	Franck Boli	3	0	0	0	3	0
14	(Norway)	MF	Herman Stengel	4	0	1	0	5	0
15	(Finland)	DF	Ville Jalasto	5	0	0	0	5	0
28	(Ivory Coast)	MF	Luc Kassi	1	0	0	0	1	0
81	(Norway)	MF	Anders Trondsen	6	0	1	0	7	0
			TOTALS	29	2	3	0	32	2
