= 2012 Stabæk Fotball season =

Stabæk
2012 season
- Chairman: Kjell Johnsen
- Manager: Petter Belsvik
- Stadium: Nadderud Stadion
- Tippeligaen: 16th
- Norwegian Cup: Third Round vs Asker
- Europa League: First Qualifying Round vs JJK
- Top goalscorer: League: Fredrik Brustad (4); All: Fredrik Brustad (9)
- Highest home attendance: 5,508 vs Aalesund; 25 March 2012
- Lowest home attendance: 693 vs JJK; 12 July 2012
- Average home league attendance: 3,70421 November 2012

The 2012 season was Stabæk's 7th consecutive year in Tippeligaen, and their 17th season in the top flight of Norwegian football. It was Petter Belsvik's first season as the club's manager after Jörgen Lennartsson joined IF Elfsborg at the end of the previous season. Stabæk also competed in the UEFA Europa League after qualifying through the Fair Play rankings. They entered, and were knocked out, in the first qualifying round against JJK of Finland. On 28 October, Stabæk were relegated from the Tippeligaen to the Adeccoligaen with three games still remaining.

== Squad ==
As of 7 August 2012

Note: Flags indicate national team as defined under FIFA eligibility rules; some limited exceptions apply. Players may hold more than one non-FIFA nationality.

No.	Pos.	Nation	Player
1	GK	CIV	Sayouba Mandé
2	DF	ISL	Bjarni Ólafur Eiríksson
3	DF	ISL	Elfar Freyr Helgason
4	DF	USA	Sean Cunningham (on loan from Molde)
5	DF	NOR	Jørgen Hammer
6	FW	NOR	Fredrik Brustad
7	FW	NOR	Torstein Andersen Aase
8	FW	NOR	Stian Sortevik
10	MF	LBN	Adnan Haidar
11	FW	CIV	Franck Boli
13	MF	NOR	Bjarte Haugsdal
14	MF	NOR	Herman Stengel

No.	Pos.	Nation	Player
15	DF	FIN	Ville Jalasto
17	DF	NOR	Kim Hunstad
18	FW	NOR	Mads Stokkelien
20	FW	ISL	Veigar Páll Gunnarsson
21	FW	NOR	Abdurahim Laajab (on loan from Vålerenga)
22	GK	NOR	Jan Kjell Larsen
24	MF	NOR	Anders Trondsen
25	MF	NOR	Erik Benjaminsen
26	DF	NOR	Thor Søndergaard Lange
27	MF	NOR	David Hanssen
28	MF	CIV	Luc Kassi
81	MF	NOR	Christer Kleiven

== Transfers ==
=== Winter ===
In: Note: Flags indicate national team as defined under FIFA eligibility rules; some limited exceptions apply. Players may hold more than one non-FIFA nationality.

No.	Pos.	Nation	Player
1	GK	CIV	Sayouba Mandé (from (Ivory Coast) Sporting Consultant)
4	DF	USA	Sean Cunningham (loan from (Norway) Molde)
8	MF	NOR	Stian Sortevik (from (Norway) Hønefoss)
10	MF	LBN	Adnan Haidar (from (Norway) Vålerenga)
11	FW	CIV	Franck Boli (from (Ivory Coast) Sporting Consultant)
13	MF	NOR	Bjarte Haugsdal (from (Norway) Brann)
18	FW	NOR	Mads Stokkelien (from (Norway) Start)
26	MF	USA	Ricardo Clark (loan from (Germany) Eintracht Frankfurt)
81	MF	NOR	Christer Kleiven (from (Norway) Start)

Out: Note: Flags indicate national team as defined under FIFA eligibility rules; some limited exceptions apply. Players may hold more than one non-FIFA nationality.

No.	Pos.	Nation	Player
1	GK	NOR	Jon Knudsen (to (Norway) Fredrikstad)
8	MF	CMR	Alain Junior Ollé Ollé (to (Sweden) Åtvidaberg)
9	FW	GAB	Gilles Mbang Ondo (to (Norway) Sandnes Ulf)
13	MF	ISL	Pálmi Rafn Pálmason (to (Norway) Lillestrøm)
15	DF	NOR	Morten Skjønsberg (to (Sweden) Norrköping)
17	MF	SWE	Pontus Farnerud (to (Sweden) Göteborg)
18	MF	SWE	Marcus Bergholtz (loan return to (Sweden) Helsingborg)
19	MF	SWE	Johan Andersson (to (Norway) Lillestrøm)
21	MF	USA	Mix Diskerud (loan to (Belgium) Gent)
29	DF	BIH	Haris Skenderović (to (Sweden) Syrianska)

=== Summer ===
In: Note: Flags indicate national team as defined under FIFA eligibility rules; some limited exceptions apply. Players may hold more than one non-FIFA nationality.

No.	Pos.	Nation	Player
3	DF	ISL	Elfar Freyr Helgason (from (Greece) AEK Athens)
15	DF	FIN	Ville Jalasto (from Aalesund)
20	FW	ISL	Veigar Páll Gunnarsson (from Vålerenga)
21	MF	USA	Mix Diskerud (loan return from Gent)
21	FW	NOR	Abdurahim Laajab (on loan from Vålerenga)
28	MF	CIV	Luc Kassi

Out: Note: Flags indicate national team as defined under FIFA eligibility rules; some limited exceptions apply. Players may hold more than one non-FIFA nationality.

No.	Pos.	Nation	Player
16	DF	NOR	Tor Marius Gromstad (Died)
21	MF	USA	Mix Diskerud (to (Norway) Rosenborg)
23	DF	NOR	Vegar Eggen Hedenstad (to (Germany) Freiburg)
26	MF	USA	Ricardo Clark (loan return to (Germany) Eintracht Frankfurt)

== Competitions ==
=== Tippeligaen ===
==== Results summary ====
Overall								Home						Away					
Pld	W	D	L	GF	GA	GD	Pts	W	D	L	GF	GA	GD	W	D	L	GF	GA	GD
30	5	2	23	26	64	−38	17	3	1	11	10	28	−18	2	1	12	16	36	−20

==== Results by round ====
Round	1	2	3	4	5	6	7	8	9	10	11	12	13	14	15	16	17	18	19	20	21	22	23	24	25	26	27	28	29	30
Ground	H	A	A	H	A	H	A	H	H	A	H	A	A	H	A	H	A	H	H	A	H	A	H	A	H	A	H	A	H	A
Result	D	L	L	L	L	L	L	L	L	L	W	W	L	L	L	L	L	L	W	L	L	W	L	L	L	D	L	L	W	L
Position	11	15	16	16	16	16	16	16	16	16	16	16	16	16	16	16	16	16	16	16	16	16	16	16	16	16	16	16	16	16

Updated to match(es) played on 21 October 2012. Source: see below
A = Away; H = Home; W = Win; D = Draw; L = Loss

==== Results ====
25 March 2012 1	Stabæk	0–0	Aalesund	Bærum
18:00 CET (UTC+01)		Summary		Stadium: Nadderud Stadion; Attendance: 5,508

1 April 2012 2	Fredrikstad	5–1	Stabæk	Fredrikstad
18:00 CEST (UTC+2)	Elyounoussi 14'; Hussain 41'; Valencia 53'; Landgren 76'; Hagen 84'	Summary	Boli 4'	Stadium: Fredrikstad Stadion; Attendance: 7,624

9 April 2012 3	Tromsø	3–0	Stabæk	Tromsø
18:00 CEST (UTC+2)	Andersen 19'; Mbodj 45'; Norbye 76'	Summary		Stadium: Alfheim Stadion; Attendance: 3,903

16 April 2012 4	Stabæk	0–2	Hønefoss	Bærum
19:00 CEST (UTC+2)		Summary	Riku Riski 47' (pen.), 90+3'	Stadium: Nadderud Stadion; Attendance: 3,340

22 April 2012 5	Sandnes Ulf	2–1	Stabæk	Sandnes
18:00 CEST (UTC+2)	Þorsteinsson 51'; Skjølsvik 58' (pen.); Aanestad (red card) 84'	Summary	Brustad 65'; Gromstad (yellow card) 57' (yellow-red card) 85'	Stadium: Sandnes Idrettspark; Attendance: 3,705

28 April 2012 6	Stabæk	0–2	Odd Grenland	Bærum
18:00 CEST (UTC+2)		Summary	Johnsen 11'; Børven 30'	Stadium: Nadderud Stadion; Attendance: 3,430

4 May 2012 7	Rosenborg	3–1	Stabæk	Trondheim
18:00 CEST (UTC+2)	Midtsjø 70'; Dočkal 75'; Svensson 80'	Summary	Boli 86'	Stadium: Lerkendal Stadion; Attendance: 12,143; Referee: Andres Johansen

12 May 2012 8	Stabæk	0–5	Molde	Bærum
16:00 CEST (UTC+2)		Summary	Hestad 3'; Angan 6', 66'; Gatt 9'; Berget 83'	Stadium: Nadderud Stadion; Attendance: 4,207

20 May 2012 9	Stabæk	0–2	Haugesund	Bærum
18:00 CEST (UTC+2)		Summary	Søderlund 37', 65'	Stadium: Nadderud Stadion; Attendance: 3,721

23 May 2012 10	Viking	1–0	Stabæk	Stavanger
19:00 CEST (UTC+2)	Nisja 87'	Summary		Stadium: Viking Stadion; Attendance: 8,132

28 May 2012 11	Stabæk	4–1	Lillestrøm	Bærum
18:00 CEST (UTC+2)	Aase 3'; Brustad 15', 16'; Hedenstad 19'	Summary	Knudtzon 10'	Stadium: Nadderud Stadion; Attendance: 4,001

24 June 2012 12	Vålerenga	1–2	Stabæk	Oslo
16:00 CEST (UTC+2)	Nordvik (red card) 33'; Nielsen 90+2'	Summary	Hedenstad 50'; Kleiven 71'	Stadium: Ullevaal Stadion; Attendance: 13,025

30 June 2012 13	Brann	2–1	Stabæk	Bergen
16:00 CEST (UTC+2)	Austin 4' (pen.); Ojo 18'	Summary	Kleiven 60'	Stadium: Brann Stadion; Attendance: 12,346

8 July 2012 14	Stabæk	1–2	Strømsgodset	Bærum
18:00 CEST (UTC+2)	Haugsdal 86'	Summary	Storflor 53'; Kovács 79'	Stadium: Nadderud Stadion; Attendance: 3,698

15 July 2012 15	Sogndal	3–1	Stabæk	Sogndalsfjøra
18:00 CEST (UTC+2)	Flo 5', 53'; Brochmann 65'	Summary	Stokkelien 14'	Stadium: Fosshaugane Campus; Attendance: 3,128

22 July 2012 16	Stabæk	1–3	Vålerenga	Bærum
16:00 CEST (UTC+2)	Brustad 74'	Summary	Larsen 7'; Pedersen 69', 74'	Stadium: Nadderud Stadion; Attendance: 4,476; Referee: Espen Berntsen

28 July 2012 17	Aalesund	3–1	Stabæk	Ålesund
18:00 CEST (UTC+2)	Arnefjord 43'; Stewart 65'; Ulvestad 88' (pen.)	Summary	Boli 45+4'	Stadium: Color Line Stadion; Attendance: 9,066; Referee: Dag Vidar Hafsås

5 August 2012 18	Stabæk	0–4	Brann	Bærum
19:00 CEST (UTC+2)		Summary	Bentley 36', 51'; Sævarsson 46'; Huseklepp 81'	Stadium: Nadderud Stadion; Attendance: 4,086; Referee: Espen Berntsen

12 August 2012 19	Stabæk	2–1	Sandnes Ulf	Bærum
18:00 CEST (UTC+2)	Kleiven 6'; Hammer 15'	Summary	Helgason 85' (o.g.)	Stadium: Nadderud Stadion; Attendance: 3,208; Referee: Anders Johansen

26 August 2012 20	Haugesund	4–1	Stabæk	Haugesund
18:00 CEST (UTC+2)	Søderlund 1'; Fevang 3'; Myrestam 23'; Storbæk 50'	Summary	Haugsdal 45+2'	Stadium: Haugesund Stadion; Attendance: 4,349; Referee: Svein-Erik Edvartsen

3 September 2012 21	Stabæk	0–2	Rosenborg	Bærum
19:00 CEST (UTC+2)	Larsen (red card) 86'	Summary	Iversen 49', 54'	Stadium: Nadderud Stadion; Attendance: 5,284; Referee: Svein-Erik Edvartsen

16 September 2012 22	Odd Grenland	1–2	Stabæk	Skien
18:00 CEST (UTC+2)	Herolind Shala 80'	Summary	Eiriksson 3'; Brustad 40'	Stadium: Skagerak Arena; Attendance: 5,021; Referee: Tom Hagen

23 September 2012 23	Stabæk	0–1	Fredrikstad	Bærum
18:00 CEST (UTC+2)		Summary	Pusic 84'	Stadium: Nadderud Stadion; Attendance: 4,088; Referee: Kristoffer Helgerud

30 September 2012 24	Molde	4–3	Stabæk	Molde
18:00 CEST (UTC+2)	Chima 25', 29', 51'; Stamnestrø 49'	Report	Boli 1'; Gunnarsson 32'; Haugsdal 56'	Stadium: Aker Stadion; Attendance: 8,827; Referee: Kjetil Sælen

7 October 2012 25	Stabæk	0–1	Tromsø	Bærum
18:00 CEST (UTC+2)		Summary	Årst 73'	Stadium: Nadderud Stadion; Attendance: 3,365; Referee: Dag Vidar Hafsås

21 October 2012 26	Hønefoss	0–0	Stabæk	Hønefoss
18:00 CEST (UTC+2)		Summary	Hunstad (yellow card) 54'; Haugsdal (yellow card) 90+4'	Stadium: Aka Arena; Attendance: 2,006; Referee: Svein Oddvar Moen

28 October 2012 27	Stabæk	0–1	Viking	Bærum
18:00 CET (UTC+01)		Summary	Olsen 70'	Stadium: Nadderud Stadion; Attendance: 3,090; Referee: Tom Hagen

4 November 2012 28	Lillestrøm	6–0	Stabæk	Lillestrøm
18:00 CET (UTC+01)	Moen 22'; Helstad 52'; Pálmason 76', 79'; Bolly 88'; Gulbrandsen 90'	Summary		Stadium: Åråsen Stadion; Attendance: 4,569; Referee: Tore Hansen

11 November 2012 29	Stabæk	2–1	Sogndal	Bærum
18:00 CET (UTC+01)	Boli 18'; Jalasto 23'	Summary	Flo 55'	Stadium: Nadderud Stadion; Attendance: 3,066; Referee: Kristoffer Helgerud

18 November 2012 30	Strømsgodset	3–1	Stabæk	Drammen
18:00 CET (UTC+01)	Kamara 6'; Kovács 24', 88'	Summary	Gunnarsson 11'	Stadium: Marienlyst Stadion; Attendance: 7,333; Referee: Per Ivar Staberg

==== Table ====
Pos	Team	Pld	W	D	L	GF	GA	GD	Pts	Qualification or relegation
12	Sogndal	30	8	10	12	29	37	−8	34	
13	Hønefoss	30	7	12	11	30	42	−12	33	
14	Sandnes Ulf (O)	30	8	8	14	44	56	−12	32	Qualification for the relegation play-offs
15	Fredrikstad (R)	30	9	3	18	42	59	−17	30	Relegation to First Division
16	Stabæk (R)	30	5	2	23	25	69	−44	17	Relegation to First Division

Source: fotball.no
Rules for classification: 1) points; 2) goal difference; 3) number of goals scored.
(O) Play-off winners; (R) Relegated

=== Norwegian Cup ===
1 May 2012 First Round	Lommedalen	0–3	Stabæk	Lommedalen
18:00 CEST (UTC+2)		Summary	Brustad 24', 55'; Kleiven 88'	Stadium: Lommedalen gress Attendance: 2,065; Referee: Kristian Randen

9 May 2012 Second Round	Fana	1–4 (a.e.t.)	Stabæk	Fana
18:00 CEST (UTC+2)	Lerpold 77'	Summary	Clark 74'; Brustad 105', 106'; Boli 109'	Stadium: Fana Stadion; Attendance: 500; Referee: Jon Ophuus

20 June 2012 Third Round	Asker	2–1	Stabæk	Asker
17:00 CEST (UTC+2)	Notice 53'; Tollås 88'	Summary	Haugsdal 78'	Stadium: Føyka Stadion; Attendance: 2,041; Referee: Martin Lundby

=== UEFA Europa League ===
==== Qualifying rounds ====
5 July 2012 First qualifying round 1st leg	JJK (Finland)	2–0	(Norway) Stabæk	Jyväskylä
18:00 CEST (UTC+2)	Gruborovics 16'; Wusu 66'	Report		Stadium: Harjun stadion Attendance: 1,817; Referee: Radek Matějek (Czech Republic)

12 July 2012 First qualifying round 2nd leg	Stabæk (Norway)	3–2 (3–4 agg.)	(Finland) JJK	Bærum
19:00 CEST (UTC+2)	Kleiven 37'; Stokkelien 45+2'; Haugsdal 64'	Report	van Gelderen 45'; Innanen 51'	Stadium: Nadderud Stadion; Attendance: 693; Referee: Elmir Pilav (Bosnia and Herzegovina)

== Squad statistics ==
=== Appearances and goals ===
As of 21 November 2012

No.	Pos	Nat	Player	Total		Tippeligaen		Norwegian Football Cup		Europa League	
No.	Pos	Nat	Player	Apps	Goals	Apps	Goals	Apps	Goals	Apps	Goals
1	GK	(Ivory Coast) CIV	Sayouba Mandé	22	0	18+0	0	2+0	0	2+0	0
2	DF	(Iceland) ISL	Bjarni Ólafur Eiríksson	33	1	28+0	1	3+0	0	2+0	0
3	DF	(Iceland) ISL	Elfar Freyr Helgason	7	0	7+0	0	0+0	0	0+0	0
4	DF	(United States) USA	Sean Cunningham	23	0	18+0	0	3+0	0	2+0	0
5	DF	(Norway) NOR	Jørgen Hammer	27	1	22+2	1	1+0	0	2+0	0
6	MF	(Norway) NOR	Fredrik Brustad	32	9	25+2	5	2+1	4	2+0	0
7	FW	(Norway) NOR	Torstein Andersen Aase	7	1	4+2	1	1+0	0	0+0	0
8	MF	(Norway) NOR	Stian Sortevik	22	0	11+8	0	2+0	0	0+1	0
10	MF	(Lebanon) LBN	Adnan Haidar	29	0	20+4	0	3+0	0	1+1	0
11	FW	(Ivory Coast) CIV	Franck Boli	32	6	19+9	5	2+1	1	0+1	0
13	MF	(Norway) NOR	Bjarte Haugsdal	24	5	17+3	3	0+2	1	2+0	1
14	MF	(Norway) NOR	Herman Stengel	25	0	15+5	0	1+2	0	1+1	0
15	DF	(Finland) FIN	Ville Jalasto	11	1	11+0	1	0+0	0	0+0	0
17	DF	(Norway) NOR	Kim Hunstad	9	0	7+2	0	0+0	0	0+0	0
18	FW	(Norway) NOR	Mads Stokkelien	23	2	8+10	1	2+1	0	1+1	1
20	FW	(Iceland) ISL	Veigar Páll Gunnarsson	10	2	10+0	2	0+0	0	0+0	0
21	FW	(Norway) NOR	Abdurahim Laajab	5	0	0+5	0	0+0	0	0+0	0
22	GK	(Norway) NOR	Jan Kjell Larsen	14	0	12+1	0	1+0	0	0+0	0
24	MF	(Norway) NOR	Anders Trondsen	2	0	0+2	0	0+0	0	0+0	0
25	MF	(Norway) NOR	Erik Benjaminsen	5	0	0+3	0	0+2	0	0+0	0
27	MF	(Norway) NOR	David Hanssen	18	0	15+2	0	0+0	0	0+1	0
28	MF	(Ivory Coast) CIV	Luc Kassi	5	0	0+5	0	0+0	0	0+0	0
81	MF	(Norway) NOR	Christer Kleiven	34	5	30+0	3	2+0	1	2+0	1
Players away from Stabæk on loan:
Players who appeared for Stabæk no longer at the club:
16	DF	(Norway) NOR	Tor Marius Gromstad	8	0	6+0	0	2+0	0	0+0	0
23	DF	(Norway) NOR	Vegar Eggen Hedenstad	19	2	14+0	2	3+0	0	2+0	0
21	FW	(Norway) NOR	Ståle Sæthre	2	0	0+2	0	0+0	0	0+0	0
26	MF	(United States) USA	Ricardo Clark	17	1	12+0	0	3+0	1	2+0	0

=== Goal scorers ===
Place	Position	Nation	Number	Name	Tippeligaen	Norwegian Football Cup	Europa League	Total
1	MF	(Norway)	6	Fredrik Brustad	5	4	0	9
2	FW	(Ivory Coast)	11	Franck Boli	5	1	0	6
3	MF	(Norway)	81	Christer Kleiven	3	1	1	5
3	MF	(Norway)	13	Bjarte Haugsdal	3	1	1	5
5	DF	(Norway)	23	Vegar Eggen Hedenstad	2	0	0	2
5	FW	(Iceland)	20	Veigar Páll Gunnarsson	2	0	0	2
5	FW	(Norway)	18	Mads Stokkelien	1	0	1	2
7	FW	(Norway)	7	Torstein Andersen Aase	1	0	0	1
7	DF	(Norway)	5	Jørgen Hammer	1	0	0	1
7	DF	(Iceland)	2	Bjarni Ólafur Eiríksson	1	0	0	1
7	DF	(Finland)	15	Ville Jalasto	1	0	0	1
7	MF	(United States)	26	Ricardo Clark	0	1	0	1
				TOTALS	25	8	3	36

=== Disciplinary record ===
Number	Nation	Position	Name	Tippeligaen		Norwegian Football Cup		UEFA Europa League		Total	
Number	Nation	Position	Name	Yellow card	Red card	Yellow card	Red card	Yellow card	Red card	Yellow card	Red card
2	(Iceland)	DF	Bjarni Ólafur Eiríksson	5	0	0	0	0	0	5	0
4	(United States)	DF	Sean Cunningham	2	0	0	0	0	0	2	0
5	(Norway)	DF	Jørgen Hammer	1	0	0	0	0	0	1	0
8	(Norway)	MF	Stian Sortevik	1	0	1	0	0	0	2	0
10	(Lebanon)	MF	Adnan Haidar	5	0	0	1	0	0	6	0
11	(Ivory Coast)	FW	Franck Boli	3	0	1	0	0	0	4	0
13	(Norway)	MF	Bjarte Haugsdal	1	0	0	0	0	0	1	0
14	(Norway)	MF	Herman Stengel	3	0	0	0	0	0	3	0
15	(Finland)	DF	Ville Jalasto	3	0	0	0	0	0	3	0
16	(Norway)	DF	Tor Marius Gromstad	2	1	0	0	0	0	2	1
17	(Norway)	DF	Kim Hunstad	1	0	0	0	0	0	1	0
18	(Norway)	FW	Mads Stokkelien	2	0	0	0	0	0	2	0
20	(Iceland)	FW	Veigar Páll Gunnarsson	2	0	0	0	0	0	2	0
21	(Norway)	FW	Ståle Sæthre	1	0	0	0	0	0	1	0
22	(Norway)	GK	Jan Kjell Larsen	1	1	0	0	0	0	1	1
23	(Norway)	DF	Vegar Eggen Hedenstad	0	0	1	0	1	0	2	0
24	(Norway)	MF	Anders Trondsen	1	0	0	0	0	0	1	0
26	(United States)	MF	Ricardo Clark	5	0	1	0	0	0	6	0
27	(Norway)	MF	David Hanssen	2	0	0	0	0	0	2	0
81	(Norway)	MF	Christer Kleiven	1	0	0	0	0	0	1	0
			TOTALS	42	2	4	0	2	0	48	2
