= 2014 Stabæk Fotball season =

Norwegian association football season

Stabæk
2014 season
- Chairman: Espen Moe
- Manager: Bob Bradley
- Stadium: Nadderud Stadion
- Tippeligaen: 9th
- Norwegian Cup: Semi-final vs Molde
- Top goalscorer: League: Franck Boli (13); All: Franck Boli (14)
- Highest home attendance: 4,938 vs Haugesund (13 August 2014)
- Lowest home attendance: 3,135 vs Molde (13 August 2014)
- Average home league attendance: 3,858
| Home colours | Away colours |

The 2014 season was Stabæk's first season back in the Tippeligaen following their relegation in 2012, their 18th season in the top flight of Norwegian football and their first season with Bob Bradley as their manager. They finished the season in 9th place whilst also reaching the Semifinals of the Norwegian Cup where they were beaten by eventual winners Molde.

== Season events ==
On 3 January, Bob Bradley was officially announced as Stabæk's new manager.

On 22 June 2014 it was announced that former USMNT starlet, Freddy Adu, was now training with the club.

=== Goalkeeper situation ===
In 2014, the first-choice goalkeeper Sayouba Mandé was called up to the 2014 FIFA World Cup. Stabæk loaned Borger Thomas from Strømsgodset to cover for him, but in Thomas' debut match on 24 May he was sent off after a mere three minutes. The third-choice goalkeeper who had joined from Stabæk's academy, Simen Omholt-Jensen (born 5 May 1995), played the rest of the match, which Stabæk lost 1–5. In the summer of 2014, Omholt-Jensen chose to continue his career in the American college system with the Duke Blue Devils.

== Squad ==
As of 11 August 2014

Note: Flags indicate national team as defined under FIFA eligibility rules; some limited exceptions apply. Players may hold more than one non-FIFA nationality.

| No. | Pos. | Nation | Player |
|---|---|---|---|
| 1 | GK | CIV | Sayouba Mandé |
| 2 | DF | DEN | Timmi Johansen |
| 3 | DF | NOR | Morten Skjønsberg |
| 4 | DF | NOR | Nicolai Næss |
| 5 | DF | NOR | Jørgen Hammer |
| 6 | FW | NOR | Fredrik Brustad |
| 7 | MF | USA | Andrew Jacobson (loan from New York City) |
| 8 | FW | NOR | Stian Sortevik |
| 9 | MF | GEO | Giorgi Gorozia |
| 10 | MF | NOR | Emil Dahle |
| 11 | FW | CIV | Franck Boli |
| 12 | GK | NOR | Borger Thomas (on loan from Strømsgodset) |
| 13 | FW | NOR | Eirik Haugstad |

| No. | Pos. | Nation | Player |
|---|---|---|---|
| 14 | DF | NOR | Jon Inge Høiland |
| 15 | DF | FIN | Ville Jalasto |
| 16 | MF | NOR | Magne Hoseth |
| 18 | MF | NZL | Craig Henderson |
| 19 | FW | NOR | Marco Hjorth |
| 21 | MF | NOR | Daniel Granli |
| 22 | GK | IND | Gurpreet Singh Sandhu |
| 28 | MF | CIV | Luc Kassi |
| 30 | MF | USA | Michael Stephens |
| 32 | MF | NOR | Tomasz Sokolowski |
| 42 | GK | NOR | Simen Omholt-Jensen |
| 81 | MF | NOR | Anders Trondsen |

== Transfers ==
=== Winter ===
In: Note: Flags indicate national team as defined under FIFA eligibility rules; some limited exceptions apply. Players may hold more than one non-FIFA nationality.

| No. | Pos. | Nation | Player |
|---|---|---|---|
| 7 | MF | GHA | Enoch Kofi Adu (loan from (Belgium) Club Brugge) |
| 10 | MF | NOR | Emil Dahle (from (Norway) Ham-Kam) |
| 12 | GK | NOR | Borger Thomas (loan from (Norway) Strømsgodset) |
| 18 | MF | NZL | Craig Henderson (from (Sweden) Mjällby) |
| 14 | DF | NOR | Jon Inge Høiland (from (Norway) Rosenborg) |
| 22 | GK | NOR | Espen Isaksen (from Retirement) |
| 30 | MF | USA | Michael Stephens (from (United States) LA Galaxy) |
| 29 | DF | ARG | Pablo Fontanello (from (Ukraine) Chornomorets Odesa) |
| 32 | MF | NOR | Tomasz Sokolowski (loan from (Norway) Brann) |

Out: Note: Flags indicate national team as defined under FIFA eligibility rules; some limited exceptions apply. Players may hold more than one non-FIFA nationality.

| No. | Pos. | Nation | Player |
|---|---|---|---|
| 3 | DF | NOR | Thor Lange (loan to (Norway) Strømmen) |
| 7 | MF | NOR | Martin Andresen (retired) |
| 9 | FW | NOR | Chuma Anene (loan return to (Norway) Vålerenga) |
| 10 | MF | LBN | Adnan Haidar (to (Norway) Bryne) |
| 13 | MF | NOR | Bjarte Haugsdal (to (Norway) Nest-Sotra) |
| 14 | MF | NOR | Herman Stengel (to (Norway) Vålerenga) |
| 18 | FW | NOR | Mads Stokkelien (to (United States) New York Cosmos) |
| 25 | DF | NOR | Erik Benjaminsen (free transfer) |

=== Summer ===
In: Note: Flags indicate national team as defined under FIFA eligibility rules; some limited exceptions apply. Players may hold more than one non-FIFA nationality.

| No. | Pos. | Nation | Player |
|---|---|---|---|
| 3 | DF | NOR | Morten Skjønsberg (from (Sweden) Norrköping) |
| 7 | MF | USA | Andrew Jacobson (loan from (United States) New York City) |
| 9 | MF | GEO | Giorgi Gorozia (from (Georgia (country)) Lokomotivi Tbilisi) |
| 16 | MF | NOR | Magne Hoseth (from (Norway) Molde) |
| 22 | GK | IND | Gurpreet Singh Sandhu (from (India) East Bengal) |
| 32 | MF | NOR | Tomasz Sokolowski (from (Norway) Brann, previously on loan) |

Out: Note: Flags indicate national team as defined under FIFA eligibility rules; some limited exceptions apply. Players may hold more than one non-FIFA nationality.

| No. | Pos. | Nation | Player |
|---|---|---|---|
| 7 | MF | GHA | Enoch Kofi Adu (to (Sweden) Malmö FF) |
| 16 | MF | NOR | Morten Thorsby (to (Netherlands) Heerenveen) |
| 22 | GK | NOR | Espen Isaksen (Retired) |
| 29 | DF | ARG | Pablo Fontanello (to (Russia) Ural) |

== Competitions ==
=== Tippeligaen ===
==== Results summary ====
| Overall | | | | | | | | Home | | | | | | Away | | | | | |
| Pld | W | D | L | GF | GA | GD | Pts | W | D | L | GF | GA | GD | W | D | L | GF | GA | GD |
|---|---|---|---|---|---|---|---|---|---|---|---|---|---|---|---|---|---|---|---|
| 30 | 11 | 6 | 13 | 44 | 52 | −8 | 39 | 6 | 3 | 6 | 21 | 21 | 0 | 5 | 3 | 7 | 23 | 31 | −8 |

==== Results by round ====
| Round | 1 | 2 | 3 | 4 | 5 | 6 | 7 | 8 | 9 | 10 | 11 | 12 | 13 | 14 | 15 | 16 | 17 | 18 | 19 | 20 | 21 | 22 | 23 | 24 | 25 | 26 | 27 | 28 | 29 | 30 |
|---|---|---|---|---|---|---|---|---|---|---|---|---|---|---|---|---|---|---|---|---|---|---|---|---|---|---|---|---|---|---|
| Ground | H | A | H | A | H | A | H | H | A | H | A | H | A | H | A | H | A | H | A | H | A | H | A | A | H | A | H | A | H | A |
| Result | W | W | L | L | W | L | L | W | W | W | L | L | L | L | L | D | L | W | D | L | W | D | W | L | W | D | D | D | L | W |
| Position | 2 | 1 | 3 | 8 | 5 | 7 | 9 | 7 | 6 | 4 | 4 | 8 | 8 | 10 | 10 | 10 | 11 | 10 | 9 | 9 | 8 | 9 | 8 | 9 | 7 | 8 | 8 | 8 | 11 | 9 |

Updated to match(es) played on 10 November 2014. Source: see below
A = Away; H = Home; W = Win; D = Draw; L = Loss

==== Results ====
| 30 March 2014 1 | Stabæk | 3–0 | Sogndal | Bærum |
| 18:00 CEST (UTC+2) | Henderson 14'; Næss 79'; Brustad 85' | Summary | | Stadium: Nadderud Stadion; Attendance: 4,017; Referee: Tore Hansen |

| 6 April 2014 2 | Brann | 1–2 | Stabæk | Bergen |
| 19:00 CEST (UTC+2) | Orlov 9' | Summary | Boli 5', 55' | Stadium: Brann Stadion; Attendance: 11,241; Referee: Kristoffer Helgerud |

| 13 April 2014 3 | Stabæk | 0–2 | Molde | Bærum |
| 15:30 CEST (UTC+2) | | Summary | Sigurðarson 22'; Chima 84' | Stadium: Nadderud Stadion; Attendance: 4,609; Referee: Espen Berntsen |

| 21 April 2014 4 | Odd | 2–1 | Stabæk | Skien |
| 19:00 CEST (UTC+2) | Fontanello 54' (o.g.); Rashani 68' | Summary | Boli 74' | Stadium: Skagerak Arena; Attendance: 6,591; Referee: Tommy Skjerven |

| 27 April 2014 5 | Stabæk | 2–1 | Bodø/Glimt | Bærum |
| 18:00 CEST (UTC+2) | Høiland 13' (pen.); Fontanello 51' | Summary | M.N'Diaye 76' | Stadium: Nadderud Stadion; Attendance: 4,002; Referee: Dag Vidar Hafsås |

| 30 April 2014 6 | Sandnes Ulf | 2–1 | Stabæk | Sandnes |
| 19:00 CEST (UTC+2) | Midtsjø 9'; Rubio 76' | Summary | Boli 62' | Stadium: Sandnes Stadium; Attendance: 2,644; Referee: Andres Johansen |

| 5 May 2014 7 | Stabæk | 0–3 | Vålerenga | Bærum |
| CEST (UTC+2) | Fontanello (red card) 45+3' | Summary | Fontanello 16' (o.g.); Larsen 31'; Kjartansson 66' | Stadium: Nadderud Stadion; Attendance: 4,131; Referee: Svein Oddvar Moen |

| 11 May 2014 8 | Stabæk | 3–2 | Sarpsborg 08 | Bærum |
| 18:00 CEST (UTC+2) | Kassi 38'; Adu 43' (pen.); Brustad 45+1' | Summary | Þórarinsson 78'; Wiig 90+2' | Stadium: Nadderud Stadion; Attendance: 3,251; Referee: Tommy Skjerven |

| 16 May 2014 9 | Rosenborg | 1–3 | Stabæk | Trondheim |
| 19:00 CEST (UTC+2) | Reginiussen 52' | Summary | Brustad 26'; Kassi 73'; Boli 79' | Stadium: Lerkendal Stadion; Attendance: 20,442; Referee: Per Ivar Staberg |

| 20 May 2014 10 | Stabæk | 2–1 | Strømsgodset | Bærum |
| 20:05 CEST (UTC+2) | Brustad 20'; Boli 67' | Summary | Kovács 63' | Stadium: Nadderud Stadion; Attendance: 4,343; Referee: Anders Johansen |

| 24 May 2014 11 | Lillestrøm | 5–1 | Stabæk | Oslo |
| 15:30 CEST (UTC+2) | Gabrielsen 18'; Knudtzon 37'; Fofana 44'; Høiland 73', 84' | Summary | B.Thomas (red card) 4'; Kassi 79' | Stadium: Åråsen Stadion; Attendance: 5,415; Referee: Svein Edvartsen |

| 9 June 2014 12 | Stabæk | 1–2 | Start | Bærum |
| 18:00 CEST (UTC+2) | Trondsen 67' | Summary | Nouri 18'; Castro 81' | Stadium: Nadderud Stadion; Attendance: 3,856; Referee: Trond Ivar Døvle |

| 12 June 2014 13 | Viking | 4–1 | Stabæk | Stavanger |
| 18:00 CEST (UTC+2) | Danielsen 45+2'; Böðvarsson 59'; Sverrisson 68'; Þorsteinsson 86' | Summary | Thorsby 84' | Stadium: Viking Stadion; Attendance: 8,685; Referee: Dag Vidar Hafsås |

| 6 July 2014 14 | Stabæk | 0–2 | Aalesund | Bærum |
| 18:00 CEST (UTC+2) | | Summary | Larsen 44'; James 62' | Stadium: Nadderud Stadion; Attendance: 3,212; Referee: Dag Vidar Hafsås |

| 13 July 2014 15 | Haugesund | 2–0 | Stabæk | Haugesund |
| 15:30 CEST (UTC+2) | Fevang 42'; Sema 58' | Summary | | Stadium: Haugesund Stadion; Attendance: 4,819; Referee: Kristoffer Helgerud |

| 19 July 2014 16 | Stabæk | 1–1 | Brann | Bærum |
| 19:00 CEST (UTC+2) | Høiland 90' | Summary | Skaanes 90+1' | Stadium: Nadderud Stadion; Attendance: 3,471; Referee: Martin Lundby |

| 29 July 2014 17 | Vålerenga | 3–2 | Stabæk | Oslo |
| 19:00 CEST (UTC+2) | Zahid 23', 82'; Kjartansson 36' | Summary | Brustad 22', 67' | Stadium: Ullevaal Stadion; Attendance: 14,656; Referee: Svein Erik Edvartsen |

| 3 August 2014 18 | Stabæk | 4–1 | Rosenborg | Bærum |
| 19:00 CEST (UTC+2) | Boli 23'; Brustad 38', 84'; Rønning 45+1' (o.g.) | Summary | Riski 57' | Stadium: Nadderud Stadion; Attendance: 4,206; Referee: Tom Harald Hagen |

| 10 August 2014 19 | Molde | 2–2 | Stabæk | Molde |
| 15:30 CEST (UTC+2) | Høiland 12'; Elyounoussi 37' | Summary | Stephens 56'; Boli 89' | Stadium: Aker Stadion; Attendance: 8,284; Referee: Dag Vidar Hafsås |

| 17 August 2014 20 | Stabæk | 1–3 | Odd | Bærum |
| 15:30 CEST (UTC+2) | Boli 28' | Summary | Shala 37'; Halvorsen 43'; Brustad 45+2' (o.g.); Nordkvelle (yellow card) 21' (yellow-red card) 49' | Stadium: Nadderud Stadion; Attendance: 4,080; Referee: Svein Oddvar Moen |

| 23 August 2014 21 | Strømsgodset | 2–3 | Stabæk | Drammen |
| 15:30 CEST (UTC+2) | Vilsvik 71'; Ogunjimi 76' | Summary | Hoseth 15'; Boli 29'; Jalasto 55' | Stadium: Marienlyst Stadion; Attendance: 7,077; Referee: Trond Ivar Døvle |

| 31 August 2014 22 | Stabæk | 1–1 | Sandnes Ulf | Bærum |
| 18:00 CEST (UTC+2) | Sortevik 80' | Summary | Furebotn 32' | Stadium: Nadderud Stadion; Attendance: 3,383; Referee: Tore Hansen |

| 14 September 2014 23 | Start | 2–3 | Stabæk | Kristiansand |
| 18:00 CEST (UTC+2) | Vilhjálmsson 67'; Asante 90+4' | Summary | Brustad 48'; Jacobson 72'; Boli 79' | Stadium: Sør Arena; Referee: Ken Henry Johnsen |

| 21 September 2014 24 | Aalesund | 3–0 | Stabæk | Ålesund |
| 18:00 CEST (UTC+2) | Mattila 65'; James 77'; Ulvestad 82' | Summary | | Stadium: Color Line Stadion; Attendance: 8,002; Referee: Tommy Skjerven |

| 28 September 2014 25 | Stabæk | 2–0 | Lillestrøm | Bærum |
| 15:30 CEST (UTC+2) | Brustad 3'; Kassi 41' | Summary | | Stadium: Nadderud Stadion; Attendance: 3,665; Referee: Svein Oddvar Moen |

| 5 October 2014 26 | Bodø/Glimt | 1–1 | Stabæk | Bodø |
| 18:00 CEST (UTC+2) | Moe 37' | Summary | Jalasto 90+1' | Stadium: Aspmyra Stadion; Attendance: 3,928; Referee: Tore Hansen |

| 19 October 2014 27 | Stabæk | 1–1 | Viking | Bærum |
| 18:00 CEST (UTC+2) | Høiland 73' (pen.) | Summary | Berisha 32' | Stadium: Nadderud Stadion; Attendance: 3,941; Referee: Anders Johansen |

| 26 October 2014 28 | Sarpsborg 08 | 1–1 | Stabæk | Sarpsborg |
| 15:30 CEST (UTC+2) | Tokstad 67' | Summary | Boli 61' | Stadium: Sarpsborg Stadion; Attendance: 3,743; Referee: Ole Gya |

| 2 November 2014 29 | Stabæk | 0–1 | Haugesund | Bærum |
| 18:00 CET (UTC+1) | | Summary | Gytkjær 60' (pen.) | Stadium: Nadderud Stadion; Attendance: 3,350; Referee: Dag Vidar Hafsås |

| 9 November 2014 30 | Sogndal | 0–2 | Stabæk | Sogndalsfjøra |
| 18:00 CET (UTC+1) | | Summary | Kassi 87'; Boli 90+2' | Stadium: Fosshaugane Campus; Attendance: 4,439; Referee: Svein Erik Edvartsen |

==== Table ====
| Pos | Team | Pld | W | D | L | GF | GA | GD | Pts |
|---|---|---|---|---|---|---|---|---|---|
| 7 | Aalesund | 30 | 11 | 8 | 11 | 40 | 39 | +1 | 41 |
| 8 | Sarpsborg 08 | 30 | 10 | 10 | 10 | 41 | 48 | −7 | 40 |
| 9 | Stabæk | 30 | 11 | 6 | 13 | 44 | 52 | −8 | 39 |
| 10 | Viking | 30 | 8 | 12 | 10 | 42 | 42 | 0 | 36 |
| 11 | Haugesund | 30 | 10 | 6 | 14 | 43 | 49 | −6 | 36 |

Source: fotball.no
Rules for classification: 1) points; 2) goal difference; 3) number of goals scored.

=== Norwegian Cup ===
| 24 April 2014 First Round | Jevnaker | 0–8 | Stabæk | Jevnaker |
| 18:00 CEST (UTC+2) | | Summary | Sortevik 15', 49', 62'; Kassi 25'; Boli 35'; Brustad 53', 63', 89' | Stadium: Jevnaker Kunstgress; Attendance: 668; Referee: Rohit Saggi |

| 8 May 2014 Second Round | Raufoss | 1–2 | Stabæk | Raufoss |
| 18:00 CEST (UTC+2) | Lekaj 70' | Summary | Thorsby 27'; Kassi 30' | Stadium: Raufoss Stadion; Referee: Per Erik Haugen |

| 4 June 2014 Third Round | Grorud | 0–3 (a.e.t.) | Stabæk | Oslo |
| 18:00 CEST (UTC+2) | M.Darboe (yellow card) 27' (yellow-red card) 71' | Summary | Dahle 110'; Kassi 114'; Adu 117' (pen.) | Stadium: Grorud Matchbane; Attendance: 360; Referee: Ola Hobber Nilsen |

| 23 July 2014 Fourth Round | Bodø/Glimt | 0–2 | Stabæk | Bodø |
| 19:00 CEST (UTC+2) | Imingen (red card) 83' | Summary | Kassi 30'; Adu 84' | Stadium: Aspmyra Stadion; Attendance: 1,699; Referee: Tom Harald Hagen |

| 13 August 2014 Quarterfinals | Stabæk | 1–0 | Haugesund | Bærum |
| 18:00 CEST (UTC+2) | Hoseth 1' | Summary | | Stadium: Nadderud Stadion; Attendance: 3,135; Referee: Tore Hansen |

| 24 September 2014 Semifinals | Stabæk | 0–1 | Molde | Bærum |
| 20:00 CEST (UTC+2) | | Summary | Elyounoussi 86' | Stadium: Nadderud Stadion; Attendance: 4,938; Referee: Tom Harald Hagen |

== Squad statistics ==
As of match played 9 November 2014

=== Appearances and goals ===
| No. | Pos | Nat | Player | Total | | Tippeligaen | | Norwegian Cup | |
| No. | Pos | Nat | Player | Apps | Goals | Apps | Goals | Apps | Goals |
|---|---|---|---|---|---|---|---|---|---|
| 1 | GK | (Ivory Coast) CIV | Sayouba Mandé | 32 | 0 | 27 | 0 | 5 | 0 |
| 2 | DF | (Denmark) DEN | Timmi Johansen | 10 | 0 | 3+4 | 0 | 3 | 0 |
| 3 | DF | (Norway) NOR | Morten Skjønsberg | 18 | 0 | 14+1 | 0 | 3 | 0 |
| 4 | DF | (Norway) NOR | Nicolai Næss | 28 | 1 | 17+6 | 1 | 5 | 0 |
| 5 | DF | (Norway) NOR | Jørgen Hammer | 3 | 0 | 0+3 | 0 | 0 | 0 |
| 6 | FW | (Norway) NOR | Fredrik Brustad | 35 | 13 | 25+5 | 10 | 5 | 3 |
| 7 | MF | (United States) USA | Andrew Jacobson | 14 | 1 | 12 | 1 | 2 | 0 |
| 8 | FW | (Norway) NOR | Stian Sortevik | 24 | 4 | 2+18 | 1 | 2+2 | 3 |
| 9 | MF | (Georgia (country)) GEO | Giorgi Gorozia | 5 | 0 | 2+2 | 0 | 0+1 | 0 |
| 10 | MF | (Norway) NOR | Emil Dahle | 6 | 1 | 0+4 | 0 | 0+2 | 1 |
| 11 | FW | (Ivory Coast) CIV | Franck Boli | 34 | 14 | 28 | 13 | 5+1 | 1 |
| 12 | GK | (Norway) NOR | Borger Thomas | 4 | 0 | 2+1 | 0 | 1 | 0 |
| 13 | FW | (Norway) NOR | Eirik Haugstad | 10 | 0 | 1+8 | 0 | 1 | 0 |
| 14 | DF | (Norway) NOR | Jon Inge Høiland | 24 | 3 | 21+1 | 3 | 1+1 | 0 |
| 15 | DF | (Finland) FIN | Ville Jalasto | 25 | 2 | 21 | 2 | 3+1 | 0 |
| 16 | MF | (Norway) NOR | Magne Hoseth | 11 | 2 | 8+1 | 1 | 2 | 1 |
| 18 | MF | (New Zealand) NZL | Craig Henderson | 8 | 1 | 4+2 | 1 | 0+2 | 0 |
| 21 | MF | (Norway) NOR | Daniel Granli | 24 | 0 | 18+3 | 0 | 3 | 0 |
| 25 | DF | (Norway) NOR | Birger Meling | 2 | 0 | 1+1 | 0 | 0 | 0 |
| 28 | MF | (Ivory Coast) CIV | Luc Kassi | 35 | 9 | 20+9 | 5 | 6 | 4 |
| 30 | MF | (United States) USA | Michael Stephens | 34 | 1 | 29+1 | 1 | 4 | 0 |
| 32 | MF | (Norway) NOR | Tomasz Sokolowski | 31 | 0 | 19+6 | 0 | 4+2 | 0 |
| 42 | GK | (Norway) NOR | Simen Omholt-Jensen | 1 | 0 | 0+1 | 0 | 0 | 0 |
| 81 | MF | (Norway) NOR | Anders Trondsen | 30 | 1 | 25+1 | 1 | 4 | 0 |
Players away from Stabæk on loan:
Players who appeared for Stabæk no longer at the club:
| 7 | MF | (Ghana) GHA | Enoch Kofi Adu | 19 | 3 | 16 | 1 | 3 | 2 |
| 16 | MF | (Norway) NOR | Morten Thorsby | 13 | 2 | 6+4 | 1 | 3 | 1 |
| 22 | GK | (Norway) NOR | Espen Isaksen | 1 | 0 | 0+1 | 0 | 0 | 0 |
| 29 | DF | (Argentina) ARG | Pablo Fontanello | 13 | 1 | 9+1 | 1 | 3 | 0 |

=== Goal scorers ===
| Place | Position | Nation | Number | Name | Tippeligaen | Norwegian Cup | Total |
|---|---|---|---|---|---|---|---|
| 1 | FW | (Ivory Coast) | 11 | Franck Boli | 13 | 1 | 14 |
| 1 | FW | (Norway) | 6 | Fredrik Brustad | 10 | 3 | 13 |
| 3 | MF | (Ivory Coast) | 28 | Luc Kassi | 5 | 4 | 9 |
| 4 | FW | (Norway) | 8 | Stian Sortevik | 1 | 3 | 4 |
| 5 | DF | (Norway) | 14 | Jon Inge Høiland | 3 | 0 | 3 |
| 5 | MF | (Ghana) | 7 | Enoch Kofi Adu | 1 | 2 | 3 |
| 7 | DF | (Finland) | 15 | Ville Jalasto | 2 | 0 | 2 |
| 7 | MF | (Norway) | 16 | Morten Thorsby | 1 | 1 | 2 |
| 7 | MF | (Norway) | 16 | Magne Hoseth | 1 | 1 | 2 |
| 10 | MF | (New Zealand) | 18 | Craig Henderson | 1 | 0 | 1 |
| 10 | DF | (Norway) | 4 | Nicolai Næss | 1 | 0 | 1 |
| 10 | DF | (Argentina) | 29 | Pablo Fontanello | 1 | 0 | 1 |
| 10 | MF | (Norway) | 81 | Anders Trondsen | 1 | 0 | 1 |
| 10 | MF | (Norway) | 30 | Michael Stephens | 1 | 0 | 1 |
| 10 | MF | (United States) | 7 | Andrew Jacobson | 1 | 0 | 1 |
| 10 | | | | Own goal | 1 | 0 | 1 |
| 10 | MF | (Norway) | 10 | Emil Dahle | 0 | 1 | 1 |
| | | | | TOTALS | 43 | 16 | 59 |

=== Disciplinary record ===
| Number | Nation | Position | Name | Tippeligaen | | Norwegian Cup | | Total | |
| Number | Nation | Position | Name | Yellow card | Red card | Yellow card | Red card | Yellow card | Red card |
| 1 | (Ivory Coast) | GK | Sayouba Mandé | 1 | 0 | 0 | 0 | 1 | 0 |
| 2 | (Denmark) | DF | Timmi Johansen | 0 | 0 | 1 | 0 | 1 | 0 |
| 3 | (Norway) | DF | Morten Skjønsberg | 3 | 0 | 1 | 0 | 4 | 0 |
| 4 | (Norway) | DF | Nicolai Næss | 1 | 0 | 0 | 0 | 1 | 0 |
| 6 | (Norway) | FW | Fredrik Brustad | 1 | 0 | 0 | 0 | 1 | 0 |
| 7 | (Ghana) | MF | Enoch Kofi Adu | 1 | 0 | 0 | 0 | 1 | 0 |
| 7 | (United States) | MF | Andrew Jacobson | 3 | 0 | 0 | 0 | 3 | 0 |
| 8 | (Norway) | MF | Stian Sortevik | 2 | 0 | 0 | 0 | 2 | 0 |
| 11 | (Ivory Coast) | FW | Franck Boli | 5 | 0 | 1 | 0 | 6 | 0 |
| 12 | (Norway) | GK | Borger Thomas | 0 | 1 | 0 | 0 | 0 | 1 |
| 13 | (Norway) | FW | Eirik Haugstad | 1 | 0 | 0 | 0 | 1 | 0 |
| 14 | (Norway) | DF | Jon Inge Høiland | 1 | 0 | 0 | 0 | 1 | 0 |
| 15 | (Finland) | DF | Ville Jalasto | 5 | 0 | 0 | 0 | 5 | 0 |
| 16 | (Norway) | MF | Magne Hoseth | 1 | 0 | 0 | 0 | 1 | 0 |
| 18 | (New Zealand) | MF | Craig Henderson | 1 | 0 | 0 | 0 | 1 | 0 |
| 28 | (Ivory Coast) | MF | Luc Kassi | 3 | 0 | 1 | 0 | 4 | 0 |
| 29 | (Argentina) | DF | Pablo Fontanello | 1 | 1 | 1 | 0 | 2 | 1 |
| 30 | (United States) | MF | Michael Stephens | 2 | 0 | 0 | 0 | 2 | 0 |
| 81 | (Norway) | MF | Anders Trondsen | 9 | 0 | 0 | 0 | 9 | 0 |
| | | | TOTALS | 40 | 2 | 5 | 0 | 45 | 2 |
