= Luc Kassi =

Ivorian footballer

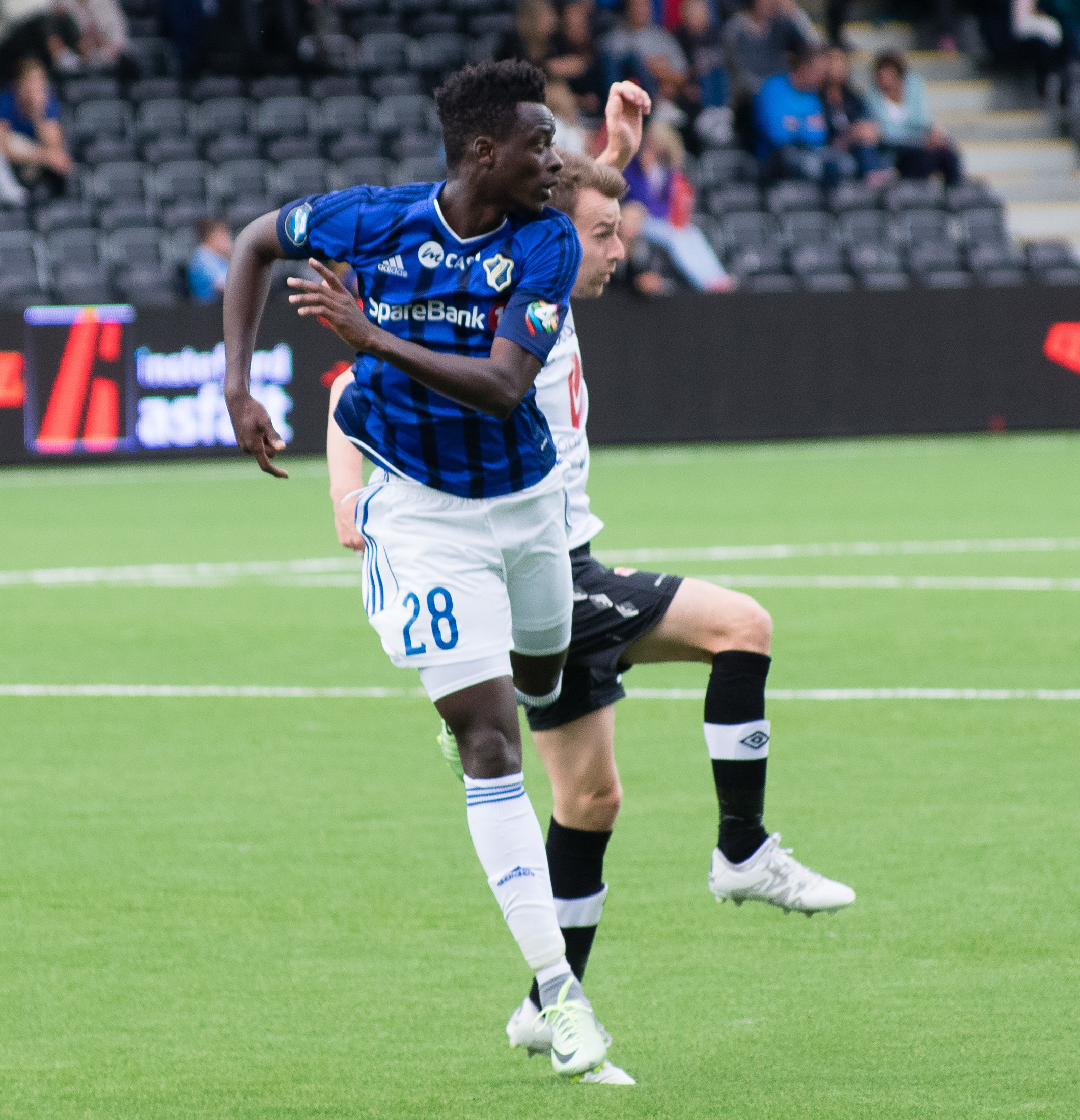
- Kassi (in blue shirt) with Stabæk

Personal information
- Full name: Aketchi Luc-Martin Kassi
- Date of birth: 20 August 1994 (age 32)
- Place of birth: Abidjan, Ivory Coast
- Height: 1.79 m (5 ft 10 in)
- Position: Midfielder

Team information
- Current team: Afturelding
- Number: 28

Youth career
- –2012: Sporting Consultant

Senior career*
Years	Team	Apps	(Gls)
2012–2022	Stabæk 2	34	(7)
2012–2022	Stabæk	172	(35)
2023–2024	KÍ	24	(4)
2024–2025	Degerfors	23	(0)
2025–	Afturelding	11	(2)
- * Club domestic league appearances and goals as of 2 November 2025

Aketchi Luc-Martin Kassi (born 20 August 1994) is an Ivorian professional footballer who plays as a midfielder for Icelandic team UMFA Afturelding.

== Club career ==
=== Stabæk ===
Playing for a football academy in Ivory Coast, Kassi was scouted by Norwegian club Stabæk along with compatriots Franck Boli and Sayouba Mandé. On 20 August 2012, he signed a professional contract with the club. He made his league debut as a substitute in the victory against Odd Grenland on 16 September 2012.

Spending ten years in the club, Kassi is described as a cult hero at Stabæk.

=== KÍ ===
On 4 February 2023, Kassi signed a one-year contract with Faroese club Klaksvíkar Ítróttarfelag, reuniting with manager Magne Hoseth, whom Kassi played together during his time in Stabæk. On 19 July 2023, he scored his first goal in UEFA Champions League in KÍ's 3–0 away win over Ferencváros in the first qualifying round.

=== Ungmennafélagið Afturelding ===
On 20 July 2025, Ungmennafélagið Afturelding announced the signing of Kassi.

== Career statistics ==
=== Club ===
As of match played 30 March 2025

Appearances and goals by club, season and competition
Club	Season	League			National cup (Note: Includes Norwegian Football Cup, Faroe Islands Cup)		Europe		Other		Total	
Club	Season	Division	Apps	Goals	Apps	Goals	Apps	Goals	Apps	Goals	Apps	Goals
Stabæk 2	2012	2. divisjon	8	0	—		—		—		8	0
Stabæk 2	2013	3. divisjon	6	3	—		—		—		6	3
Stabæk 2	2014	2. divisjon	5	2	—		—		—		5	2
Stabæk 2	2015	2. divisjon	3	1	—		—		—		3	1
Stabæk 2	2017	3. divisjon	1	1	—		—		—		1	1
Stabæk 2	2019	3. divisjon	5	0	—		—		—		5	0
Stabæk 2	2022	3. divisjon	6	0	—		—		—		6	0
Stabæk 2	Total		34	7	0	0	0	0	0	0	34	7
Stabæk	2012	Tippeligaen	5	0	0	0	0	0	—		5	0
Stabæk	2013	1. divisjon	26	7	2	0	—		—		28	7
Stabæk	2014	Tippeligaen	29	5	6	4	—		—		35	9
Stabæk	2015	Tippeligaen	28	8	6	0	—		—		34	8
Stabæk	2016	Tippeligaen	23	4	3	1	0	0	2 (Note: Appearances in Eliteserien play-offs)	0	28	5
Stabæk	2017	Eliteserien	21	4	5	2	—		—		26	6
Stabæk	2018	Eliteserien	0	0	0	0	—		0	0	0	0
Stabæk	2019	Eliteserien	23	4	3	1	—		—		26	5
Stabæk	2020	Eliteserien	15	3	—		—		—		15	3
Stabæk	2021	Eliteserien	0	0	0	0	—		—		0	0
Stabæk	2022	1. divisjon	2	0	1	0	—		—		3	0
Stabæk	Total		172	35	26	8	0	0	2	0	200	43
KÍ	2023	Faroe Islands Premier League	24	4	1	0	11	2	1 (Note: Appearances in Faroe Islands Super Cup)	0	37	6
Degerfors	2024	Superettan	20	0	1	0	—		—		21	0
Degerfors	2025	Allsvenskan	3	0	1	0	—		—		4	0
Degerfors	Total		23	0	2	0	0	0	0	0	25	0
Career total			253	46	29	8	11	2	3	0	296	56

== Honours ==
KÍ Klaksvík

- Faroe Islands Premier League: 2023

Degerfors

- Superettan: 2024
