= Sayouba Mandé =

Ivorian footballer (born 1993)

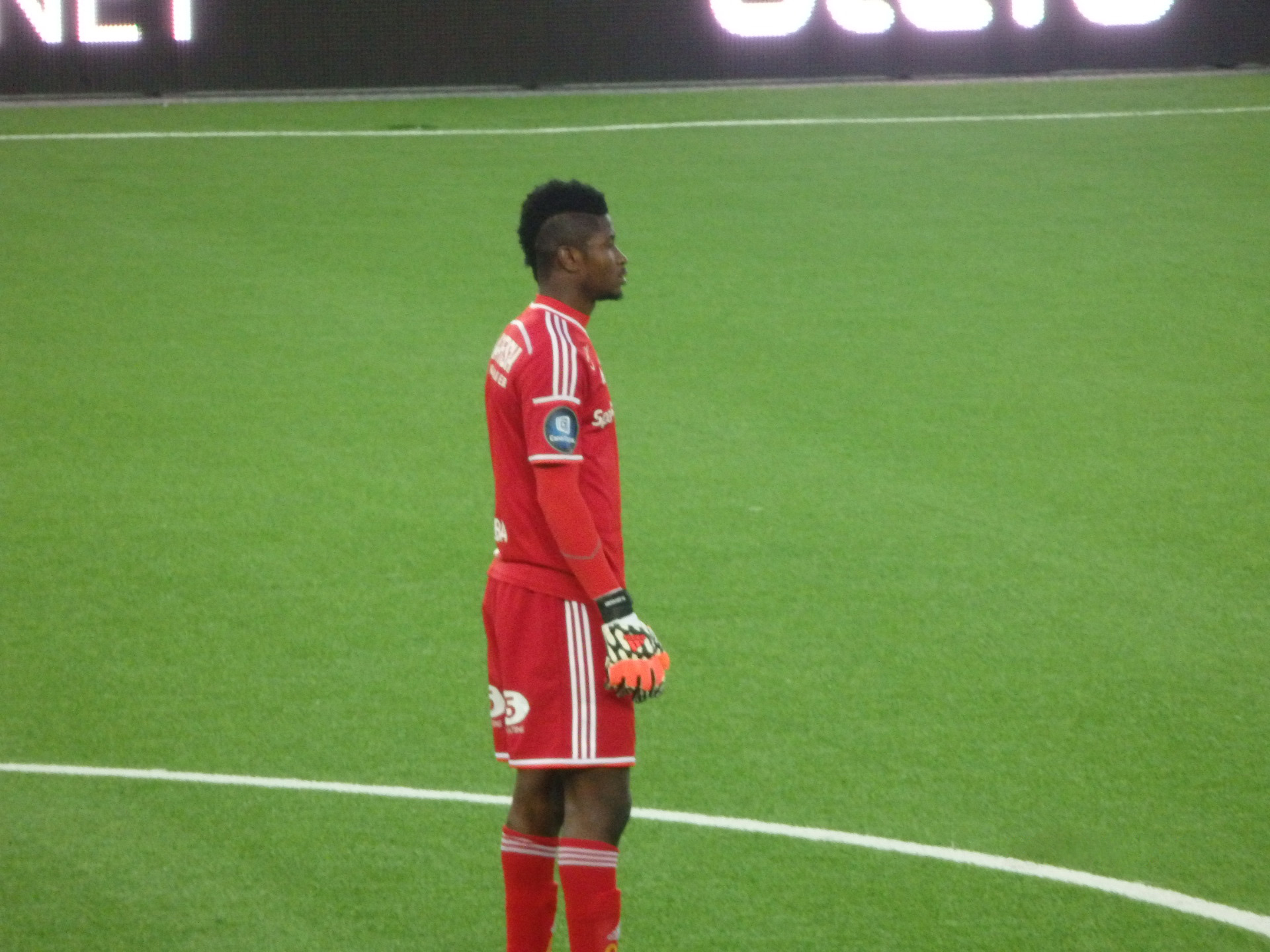

Personal information
- Full name: Sayouba Mandé
- Date of birth: 15 June 1993 (age 33)
- Place of birth: Abidjan, Ivory Coast
- Height: 1.93 m (6 ft 4 in)
- Position: Goalkeeper

Youth career
- –2012: Sporting Consultant

Senior career*
Years	Team	Apps	(Gls)
2012	→ Stabæk (loan)	9	(0)
2012–2018	Stabæk	163	(0)
2018–2023	OB	9	(0)
2022–2023	→ Helsingør (loan)	21	(0)
2024	Kongsvinger	15	(0)

International career^{‡}
2012–2020	Ivory Coast	5	(0)
- * Club domestic league appearances and goals as of 16 June 2023 ‡ National team caps and goals as of 20:54, 18 July 2019 (UTC)

Sayouba Mandé (born 15 June 1993) is a former Ivorian professional footballer who played as a goalkeeper.

== Club career ==
Mandé joined Stabæk in late March 2012 from the same Ivorian academy as Franck Boli, originally on loan until 31 July 2012. He played the first two games of the 2012 Norwegian Football Cup, and made his league debut on 20 May 2012 against FK Haugesund.

== International career ==
Mandé made his international debut for Ivory Coast in a friendly match against Belgium on 5 March 2014, and was later called up to the 2014 World Cup squad.

== Career statistics ==
=== Club ===
As of 17 July 2021

Appearances and goals by club, season and competition
Club	Season	League			National Cup		League Cup		Continental		Other		Total	
Club	Season	Division	Apps	Goals	Apps	Goals	Apps	Goals	Apps	Goals	Apps	Goals	Apps	Goals
Stabæk (loan)	2012	Eliteserien	9	0	2	0	-		2	0	-		13	0
Stabæk	2012	Eliteserien	9	0	0	0	-		0	0	-		9	0
Stabæk	2013	1. divisjon	30	0	4	0	-		-		-		34	0
Stabæk	2014	Eliteserien	27	0	5	0	-		-		-		32	0
Stabæk	2015	Eliteserien	30	0	5	0	-		-		-		35	0
Stabæk	2016	Eliteserien	29	0	0	0	-		2	0	2	0	33	0
Stabæk	2017	Eliteserien	21	0	3	0	-		-		-		24	0
Stabæk	2018	Eliteserien	17	0	2	0	-		-		-		19	0
Stabæk	Total		172	0	21	0	-	-	4	0	2	0	199	0
OB	2018–19	Superliga	0	0	0	0	-		-		-		0	0
OB	2019–20	Superliga	2	0	1	0	-		-		-		3	0
OB	2020–21	Superliga	7	0	0	0	-		-		-		7	0
OB	2021–22	Superliga	0	0	0	0	-		-		-		0	0
Total			9	0	1	0	-	-	0	0	0	0	10	0
Career total			181	0	22	0	-	-	4	0	2	0	209	0

=== International ===
As of match played 18 July 2019

Ivory Coast national team
Year	Apps	Goals
2014	1	0
2015	3	0
2018	1	0
Total	5	0

== Honours ==
Ivory Coast

- Africa Cup of Nations: 2015
