= Nicolai Næss =

Norwegian footballer (born 1993)

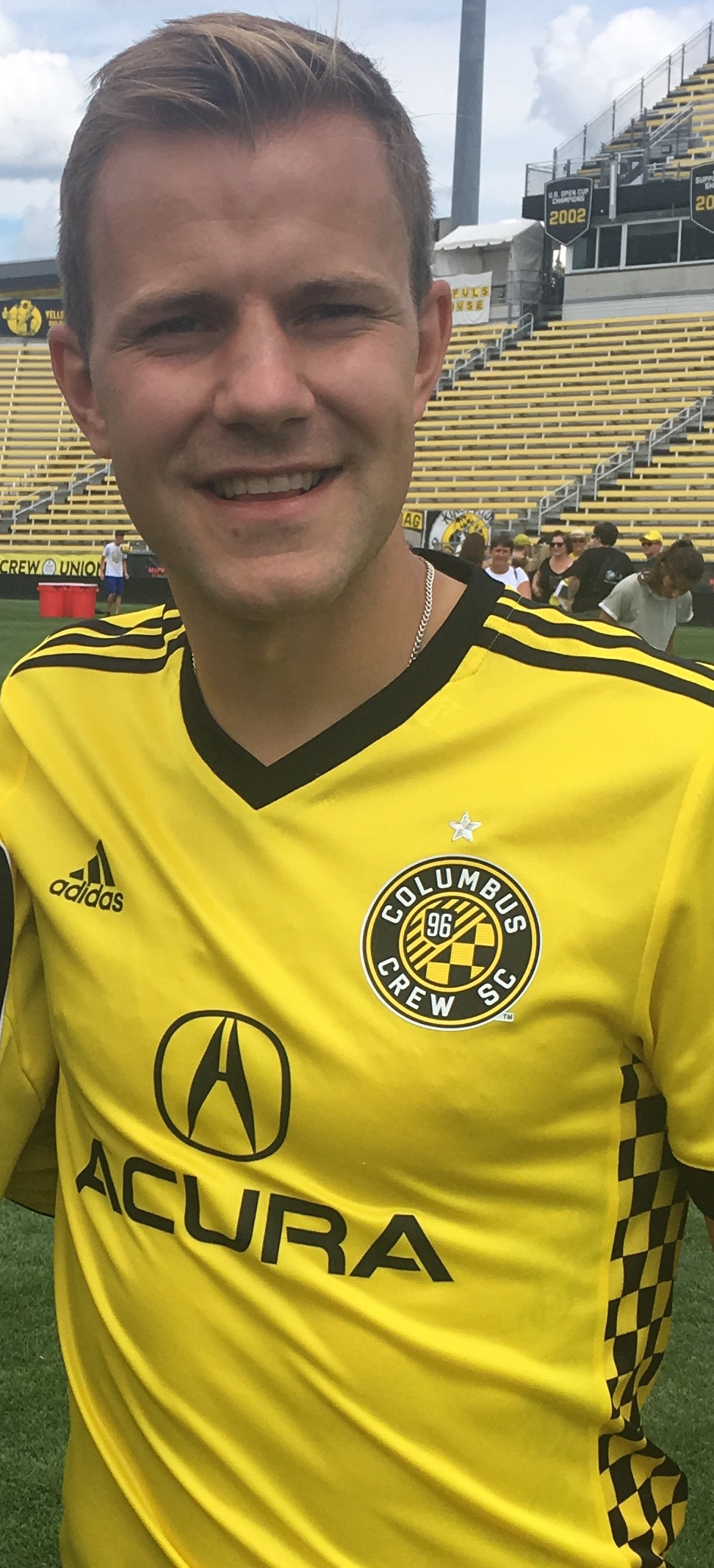

Personal information
- Date of birth: 18 January 1993 (age 33)
- Place of birth: Oslo, Norway
- Height: 1.83 m (6 ft 0 in)
- Position: Defender

Team information
- Current team: Stabæk
- Number: 3

Youth career
- Klemetsrud
- Vålerenga

Senior career*
Years	Team	Apps	(Gls)
2012	Vålerenga	5	(0)
2013–2016	Stabæk	90	(2)
2016–2017	Columbus Crew SC	31	(0)
2017–2018	Heerenveen	10	(0)
2019–2022	Sarpsborg 08	62	(1)
2022–	Stabæk	143	(7)

International career^{‡}
2012	Norway U19	2	(0)
- * Club domestic league appearances and goals as of 14 November 2026 ‡ National team caps and goals as of 20:20, 15 September 2017 (UTC)

Nicolai Næss (born 18 January 1993) is a Norwegian professional footballer who plays as a defender for Stabæk.

== Career ==
=== Club ===
Næss made his debut for Vålerenga on 31 March 2012 against Strømsgodset, they lost the game 3–2.

==== Stabæk ====
Prior to the start of the 2013 season, Næss signed for Stabæk.

==== Columbus Crew SC ====
On 21 July 2016, Næss signed with Columbus Crew. He made his club debut on 13 August 2016 in a 3–3 draw against New York City FC.

==== Heerenveen ====
On 30 August 2017, Næss transferred to Eredivisie side Heerenveen for an undisclosed fee.

== Career statistics ==
As of matches played 14 November 2026

Club	Season	League			Cup (Note: Includes the Norwegian Football Cup, U.S. Open Cup, and KNVB Cup)		Continental (Note: All appearances in the UEFA Europa League)		Other		Total	
Club	Season	Division	Apps	Goals	Apps	Goals	Apps	Goals	Apps	Goals	Apps	Goals
Vålerenga	2012	Tippeligaen	5	0	3	0	–		–		8	0
Stabæk	2013	Adeccoligaen	21	0	3	0	–		–		24	0
Stabæk	2014	Tippeligaen	24	1	5	0	–		–		29	1
Stabæk	2015	Tippeligaen	29	1	5	1	–		–		34	2
Stabæk	2016	Tippeligaen	16	0	4	0	2	0	0	0	22	0
Stabæk	Total		90	2	17	1	2	0	0	0	109	3
Columbus Crew SC	2016	MLS	13	0	0	0	–		–		13	0
Columbus Crew SC	2017	MLS	18	0	1	0	–		0	0	19	0
Columbus Crew SC	Total		31	0	1	0	0	0	0	0	32	0
Heerenveen	2017–18	Eredivisie	9	0	1	0	–		0	0	10	0
Heerenveen	2018–19	Eredivisie	1	0	1	0	–		–		2	0
Heerenveen	Total		10	0	2	0	0	0	0	0	12	0
Sarpsborg 08	2019	Eliteserien	20	1	3	0	–		–		23	1
Sarpsborg 08	2020	Eliteserien	29	0	0	0	–		–		29	0
Sarpsborg 08	2021	Eliteserien	13	0	0	0	–		–		13	0
Sarpsborg 08	Total		62	1	3	0	0	0	0	0	65	1
Stabæk Fotball	2022	OBOS-ligaen	30	3	3	1	–		–		33	4
Stabæk Fotball	2023	Eliteserien	29	1	5	0	–		–		34	1
Stabæk Fotball	2024	OBOS-ligaen	30	1	5	1	–		–		35	2
Stabæk Fotball	2025	OBOS-ligaen	26	2	5	2	–		–		31	4
Stabæk Fotball	2026	OBOS-ligaen	28	0	4	0	–		–		32	0
Stabæk Fotball	Total		143	7	22	4	0	0	0	0	165	11
Career total			341	7	45	4	2	0	0	0	388	11
