= Espen Isaksen =

Norwegian footballer (born 1979)

Personal information
- Full name: Espen Hugo Isaksen
- Date of birth: 16 January 1979 (age 47)
- Place of birth: Narvik, Norway
- Height: 1.86 m (6 ft 1 in)
- Position: Goalkeeper

Senior career*
Years	Team	Apps	(Gls)
1998–2001	Rosenborg	0	(0)
2001–2002	Byåsen	22	(0)
2002–2004	Manglerud Star	50	(0)
2004–2006	Stabæk	0	(0)
2006–2008	Odd Grenland	23	(0)
2009–2011	Tromsø	1	(0)
2014	Stabæk	1	(0)

International career^{‡}
	Norway U-17	2	(0)
- * Club domestic league appearances and goals as of 10 June 2014 ‡ National team caps and goals as of 18 June 2009

Espen Hugo Isaksen (born 16 January 1979) is a Norwegian football goalkeeper.

He started his top-level career with Rosenborg BK, but did not make a single league appearance and moved to Byåsen IL, where he spent a season and then played for 2 years for amateur side Oslo Øst. In 2004, he was signed by Stabæk Fotball, but only made 1 league appearance in 2 years he joined Odd Grenland. He retired after the 2008-season and is now the keeper coach for Tromsø IL. He later served as reserve goalkeeper. Isaksen was brought in for one game for Stabæk, because they had no keeper available for the game.

== Career statistics ==
Season	Club	Division	League		Cup		Total	
Season	Club	Division	Apps	Goals	Apps	Goals	Apps	Goals
2001	Byåsen	Adeccoligaen	22	0	0	0	22	0
2002	Manglerud Star	Adeccoligaen	21	0	0	0	21	0
2003	Manglerud Star	Adeccoligaen	29	0	1	0	30	0
2004	Stabæk	Tippeligaen	0	0	0	0	0	0
2005	Stabæk	Adeccoligaen	0	0	0	0	0	0
2006	Odd Grenland	Tippeligaen	2	0	1	0	3	0
2007	Odd Grenland	Tippeligaen	3	0	2	0	5	0
2008	Odd Grenland	Adeccoligaen	18	0	2	0	20	0
2009	Tromsø	Tippeligaen	1	0	0	0	1	0
2010	Tromsø	Tippeligaen	0	0	0	0	0	0
2011	Tromsø	Tippeligaen	0	0	0	0	0	0
2014	Stabæk	Tippeligaen	1	0	0	0	1	0
Career Total			97	0	6	0	103	0
