= Daniel Moen Hansen =

Norwegian footballer (born 1983)

Personal information
- Date of birth: 18 November 1983 (age 42)
- Place of birth: Horten, Norway
- Height: 1.87 m (6 ft 1 1/2 in)
- Position: Striker

Team information
- Current team: Strømmen
- Number: 10

Senior career*
Years	Team	Apps	(Gls)
1999–?	Ørn-Horten		
2001–2003	Brann	3	(0)
2003–2004	Mallorca B		
2004	Enköping		
2004–2005	Nybergsund		
2006	Ørn-Horten		
2007–2008	FK Tønsberg	57	(9)
2009	Randaberg	26	(11)
2010	Stavanger	26	(3)
2010	Bryne		
2011	Vidar		
2011–2012	Ull/Kisa	21	(10)
2013–	Strømmen	54	(12)
- * Club domestic league appearances and goals as of 20 April 2015

Daniel Moen Hansen (born 18 November 1983) is a Norwegian football striker who currently plays for Strømmen. He has played for a number of clubs in Scandinavia and Southern Europe.

== Career ==
Born in Horten, he started his career in Ørn-Horten, and briefly attended Norwegian College of Elite Sport before joining SK Brann. Moen Hansen made his senior debut in Brann in October 2001, and got two more Norwegian Premier League games in 2002.

He then left Brann, joining Spanish RCD Mallorca B in 2003, but the spell in Spain was no success for Hansen and in March 2004 he wanted to leave the club. In the spring of 2004 he joined Swedish team Enköpings SK. The stay was short, and Moen Hansen had a fruitless trial with Portuguese FC Penafiel, before signing for Nybergsund IL. Things went well until he broke his foot in the summer of 2005. After the 2005 season he rejoined Ørn/Horten.

After one year he moved on to FK Tønsberg. He left FK Tønsberg for Randaberg IL ahead of the 2009 season. In 2010, he played for two clubs, Stavanger IF and Bryne FK. In 2011, he moved on to FK Vidar, but already in August the same year he joined Ullensaker/Kisa IL, where he won promotion to Adeccoligaen with the club. In the beginning of the 2012 season, he was one of the top scorers of Adeccoligaen, and his goals pushed Ullensaker/Kisa to a surprise position at the top of the league. Unfortunately, he contracted an injury later in the season. Hansen joined Strømmen ahead of the 2013 season.
