= Tor Marius Gromstad =

Norwegian footballer (1989–2012)

Personal information
- Date of birth: 8 July 1989
- Place of birth: Arendal, Norway
- Date of death: 12 May 2012 (aged 22)
- Place of death: Oslo, Norway
- Height: 1.85 m (6 ft 1 in)
- Position: Defender

Youth career
- Hisøy IL

Senior career*
Years	Team	Apps	(Gls)
2006–2007	FK Arendal	41	(1)
2008–2012	Stabæk	43	(0)
Total		84	(0)
- * Club domestic league appearances and goals

Tor Marius Gromstad (8 July 1989 – 12 May 2012) was a Norwegian footballer who played as a defender for Stabæk and FK Arendal.

== Career ==
Gromstad transferred from Arendal to Stabæk in 2007, and he attended the secondary school Norges Toppidrettsgymnas while playing for Stabæk. In total he played 43 matches for the club, and Gromstad started six of the eight first matches in the 2012-season in addition to playing both Stabæk's cup matches.

== Disappearance and death ==
Gromstad was last seen after leaving his brother's apartment at 07:26 AM (UTC+2) on Saturday 12 May 2012, and was reported missing later the same night. He was not carrying his wallet or cellphone at the time of the disappearance. He was discovered dead on the morning of 14 May 2012, after being missing for 36 hours. According to a press release made by his club, Gromstad died from an accidental fall at a nearby construction site.

== Career statistics ==
Appearances and goals by club, season and competition
Club	Season	League			Cup		Total	
Club	Season	Division	Apps	Goals	Apps	Goals	Apps	Goals
Stabæk	2008	Tippeligaen	3	0	1	0	4	0
Stabæk	2009	Tippeligaen	3	0	0	0	3	0
Stabæk	2010	Tippeligaen	8	0	3	0	11	0
Stabæk	2011	Tippeligaen	16	0	1	0	17	0
Stabæk	2012	Tippeligaen	6	0	2	0	8	0
Career total			36	0	7	0	43	0
