= Torstein Andersen Aase =

Norwegian footballer (born 1991)

Personal information
- Full name: Torstein Andersen Aase
- Date of birth: 24 October 1991 (age 35)
- Place of birth: Oslo, Norway
- Height: 1.88 m (6 ft 2 in)
- Position: Striker

Team information
- Current team: Lyn
- Number: 13

Youth career
- Nordstrand

Senior career*
Years	Team	Apps	(Gls)
2006–2007	Nordstrand		
2008––2012	Stabæk	37	(4)
2013–2015	KFUM Oslo	45	(40)
2016–	Lyn	7	(2)
- * Club domestic league appearances and goals as of 25 December 2016

Torstein Andersen Aase (born 24 October 1991) is a Norwegian football striker who plays for Lyn.

Aase was born in Oslo and is the son of Thor Einar Andersen and Kristin Aase. He played youth football in Nordstrand IF, and made his senior team debut before turning 15 years old. After the 2007 season he went from Nordstrand to Stabæk Fotball. Aase moved to KFUM Oslo ahead of the 2013 season.

== Career statistics ==
Season	Club	Division	League		Cup		Total	
Season	Club	Division	Apps	Goals	Apps	Goals	Apps	Goals
2008	Stabæk	Tippeligaen	2	0	0	0	2	0
2009	Stabæk	Tippeligaen	6	1	2	0	8	1
2010	Stabæk	Tippeligaen	0	0	0	0	0	0
2011	Stabæk	Tippeligaen	22	2	2	1	24	3
2012	Stabæk	Tippeligaen	7	1	1	0	8	1
2013	KFUM Oslo	2. divisjon	15	14	0	0	15	14
2014	KFUM Oslo	2. divisjon	11	8	1	0	12	8
2015	KFUM Oslo	2. divisjon	19	18	2	2	21	20
2016	Lyn	3. divisjon	7	2	0	0	7	2
Career Total			89	46	8	3	97	49
