= Franck Boli =

Ivorian footballer

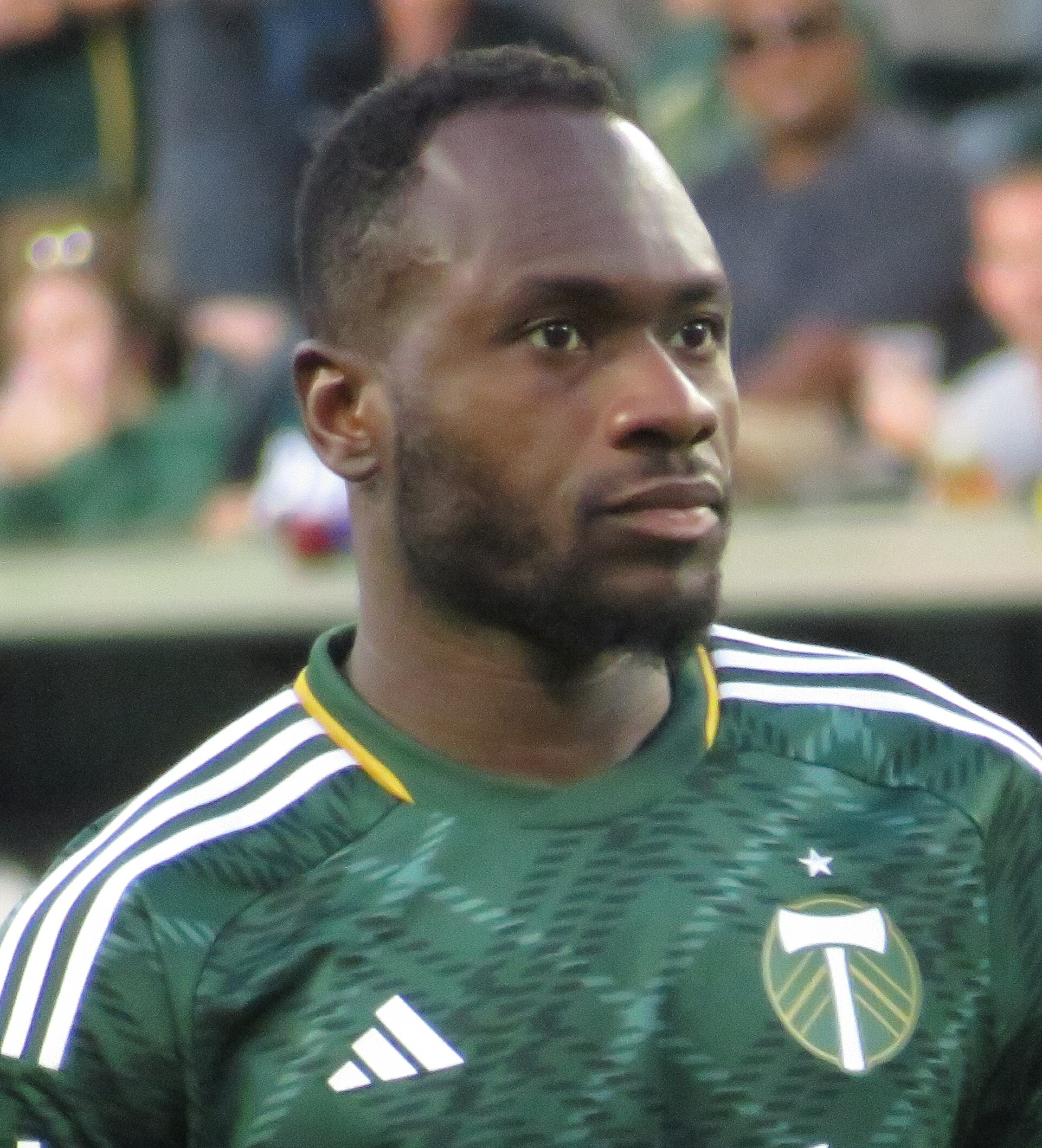
- Boli with the Portland Timbers in 2023

Personal information
- Full name: Bi Sylvestre Franck Fortune Boli
- Date of birth: 7 December 1993 (age 32)
- Place of birth: Yamoussoukro, Ivory Coast
- Height: 1.80 m (5 ft 11 in)
- Position: Forward

Youth career
- –2012: Sporting Consultant

Senior career*
Years	Team	Apps	(Gls)
2012–2015	Stabæk	82	(24)
2015–2016	Liaoning Whowin	20	(0)
2016	→ Aalesund (loan)	27	(7)
2017–2019	Stabæk	52	(27)
2019–2023	Ferencváros	84	(28)
2023	Portland Timbers	13	(4)
2024	Atlético San Luis	26	(8)

International career^{‡}
2021	Ivory Coast	1	(0)
- * Club domestic league appearances and goals as of 16:53, 18 June 2023 (UTC) ‡ National team caps and goals as of 3 September 2021

Franck Boli (born 7 December 1993) is an Ivorian professional footballer who plays as a forward.

== Club career ==
Boli signed with Eliteserien side Stabæk Fotball on 3 January 2012. The leader of sports at Stabæk Fotball, Inge André Olsen, said, "Boli has many qualities, with his technically good finishing and quick pace".

On 26 February 2015, Boli signed for Chinese Super League side Liaoning Whowin.

In 2016, Boli signed for the Norwegian club Aalesunds FK, in what the club claimed was a 1-year loan from Liaoning. In an article in the football magazine Josimar from 10 May 2019, NFF confirmed that Boli signed for Aalesunds FK on a free transfer from the Ivorian amateur club Williamsville AC before the 2016 season.

Boli returned to Stabæk on 20 December 2016, signing a three-year contract with the club. After he finished as top scorer of the 2018 Eliteserien, his contract was extended through 2021.

=== Ferencváros ===
On 1 August 2019, Boli signed for Hungarian champions Ferencváros, making him the second Eliteserien signing of the team in two years, following breakout performer Tokmac Nguen.

On 16 June 2020, Ferencváros clinched the championship by defeating Budapest Honvéd FC at the Hidegkuti Nándor Stadion on the 30th match day of the 2019–20 Nemzeti Bajnokság I season.

On 13 March 2023, Boli signed with Major League Soccer side Portland Timbers on a one-year deal.

== International career ==
Boli made his debut for the Ivory Coast national team on 3 September 2021 when he came on as a substitute for Jean Evrard Kouassi in the 62nd minute of a 2022 FIFA World Cup qualifier against Mozambique which ended in a 0–0 away draw.

== Career statistics ==
As of match played 30 October 2022

Appearances and goals by club, season and competition
Club	Season	League			National Cup		Continental		Other		Total	
Club	Season	Division	Apps	Goals	Apps	Goals	Apps	Goals	Apps	Goals	Apps	Goals
Stabæk	2012	Tippeligaen	28	5	3	1	2	0	–		33	6
Stabæk	2013	1. divisjon	26	6	4	3	–		–		30	9
Stabæk	2014	Tippeligaen	28	13	6	1	–		–		34	14
Stabæk	Total		82	24	13	5	2	0	0	0	97	29
Liaoning Whowin	2015	Chinese Super League	20	0	0	0	–		–		20	0
Liaoning Whowin	2016	Chinese Super League	0	0	0	0	–		–		0	0
Liaoning Whowin	Total		20	0	0	0	0	0	0	0	20	0
Aalesund (loan)	2016	Tippeligaen	27	6	2	0	–		–		29	6
Stabæk	2017	Eliteserien	10	4	1	0	–		–		11	4
Stabæk	2018	Eliteserien	29	17	3	3	–		2	0	34	20
Stabæk	2019	Eliteserien	13	6	2	2	–		–		15	8
Stabæk	Total		52	27	6	5	0	0	2	0	60	32
Ferencváros	2019–20	Nemzeti Bajnokság I	28	10	1	1	8	1	0	0	37	12
Ferencváros	2020–21	Nemzeti Bajnokság I	28	10	3	1	9	3	0	0	40	14
Ferencváros	2021–22	Nemzeti Bajnokság I	19	5	4	4	4	2	0	0	27	11
Ferencváros	2022–23	Nemzeti Bajnokság I	8	3	0	0	12	2	0	0	20	5
Ferencváros	Total		83	28	8	6	33	8	0	0	124	42
Career total			264	85	29	16	35	8	2	0	330	109

== Honours ==
Ferencváros

- NB I: 2019–20, 2020–21, 2021–22
- Magyar Kupa: 2021–22

Individual

- Eliteserien top scorer: 2018
