= Adnan Haidar =

Association football player and coach (born 1989)

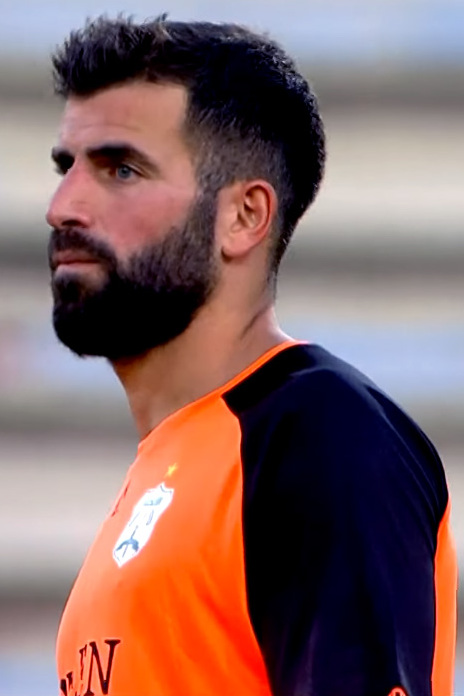
- Haidar with Ansar in 2019

Personal information
- Full name: Adnan Mahmoud Haidar
- Date of birth: 3 August 1989 (age 37)
- Place of birth: Drammen, Norway
- Height: 1.80 m (5 ft 11 in)
- Position: Midfielder

Team information
- Current team: Klemetsrud (player-assistant coach)

Youth career
- –2001: Klemetsrud
- 2001–2008: Vålerenga

Senior career*
Years	Team	Apps	(Gls)
2008–2010	Vålerenga 2	4	(0)
2008–2011	Vålerenga	18	(0)
2009	→ Skeid (loan)	9	(0)
2012–2013	Stabæk 2	7	(2)
2012–2013	Stabæk	43	(0)
2014	Bryne 2	7	(2)
2014	Bryne	19	(0)
2015	HamKam	17	(1)
2016	Moss 2	1	(0)
2016	Moss	22	(1)
2016–2017	Klemetsrud (futsal)	9	(9)
2017	KFUM 2	2	(2)
2017	KFUM	14	(3)
2017–2020	Ansar	42	(1)
2021	Holmlia	11	(3)
2022–	Klemetsrud	89	(39)
2024–2025	Klemetsrud (futsal)	7	(6)

International career
2005	Norway U16	9	(0)
2008	Norway U19	7	(0)
2012–2019	Lebanon	37	(1)

Managerial career
- 2022–: Klemetsrud (assistant)
- * Club domestic league appearances and goals as of 17 June 2026

Adnan Mahmoud Haidar (Arabic: عدنان محمود حيدر, Lebanese Arabic pronunciation: [ʕadˈneːn maħˈmuːd ˈħajdar]; born 3 August 1989) is a professional football player and coach. A midfielder, he is a player-assistant coach for Norwegian club Klemetsrud.

Born and raised in Norway, Haidar represented them at youth level internationally before switching allegiance for Lebanon at senior level. He played for Lebanon at the 2019 AFC Asian Cup.

== Early life ==
Haidar was born in Drammen, Norway, to Lebanese parents, and grew up in Oslo, where he lived in the Klemetsrud neighborhood. He began playing football with local club Klemetsrud before joining Vålerenga's youth academy in 2001.

== Club career ==
=== Vålerenga ===
After progressing through Vålerenga's youth system, Haidar made his senior debut for the Tippeligaen club in 2008. He made three appearances in all competitions during the season and won the Norwegian Cup in his first senior campaign.

In 2009, Haidar joined Skeid on loan for the season, making 11 appearances in the First Division before returning to Vålerenga.

At the end of the 2011 season, Haidar declined a contract offer from Vålerenga in search of more first-team opportunities and left the club. Following his departure, he trained with English club Burnley but did not earn a contract and later declined a second trial opportunity.

=== Stabæk ===
In January 2012, Haidar signed for Stabæk as a free agent and was assigned the number 10 shirt. He remained with the club following their relegation to the First Division and helped them secure an immediate return to the Tippeligaen by winning promotion in the 2012 season.

After Stabæk's promotion, Haidar left the club after making 24 appearances across the 2012 and 2013 seasons.

=== Bryne, HamKam, Moss, KFUM ===
In March 2014, Haidar signed for Bryne on a one-year contract.

Between 2015 and 2016, Haidar played for HamKam and Moss.

In April 2017, Haidar joined KFUM.

=== Ansar ===
In August 2017, Haidar moved to Lebanese Premier League side Ansar, and was part of a midfield trio alongside Abbas Ali Atwi and Alaa El Baba during the 2017–18 season.

Despite reported interest from rivals Nejmeh, Haidar renewed his contract with Ansar in August 2018, and again in August 2019. He remained with the club until 2020, when he left following the economic crisis in Lebanon.

=== Holmlia, Klemetsrud ===
After returning to Norway, Haidar joined Holmlia in the Fourth Division in summer 2021. On 22 February 2022, he returned to his former club Klemetsrud as a player-assistant coach.

== International career ==
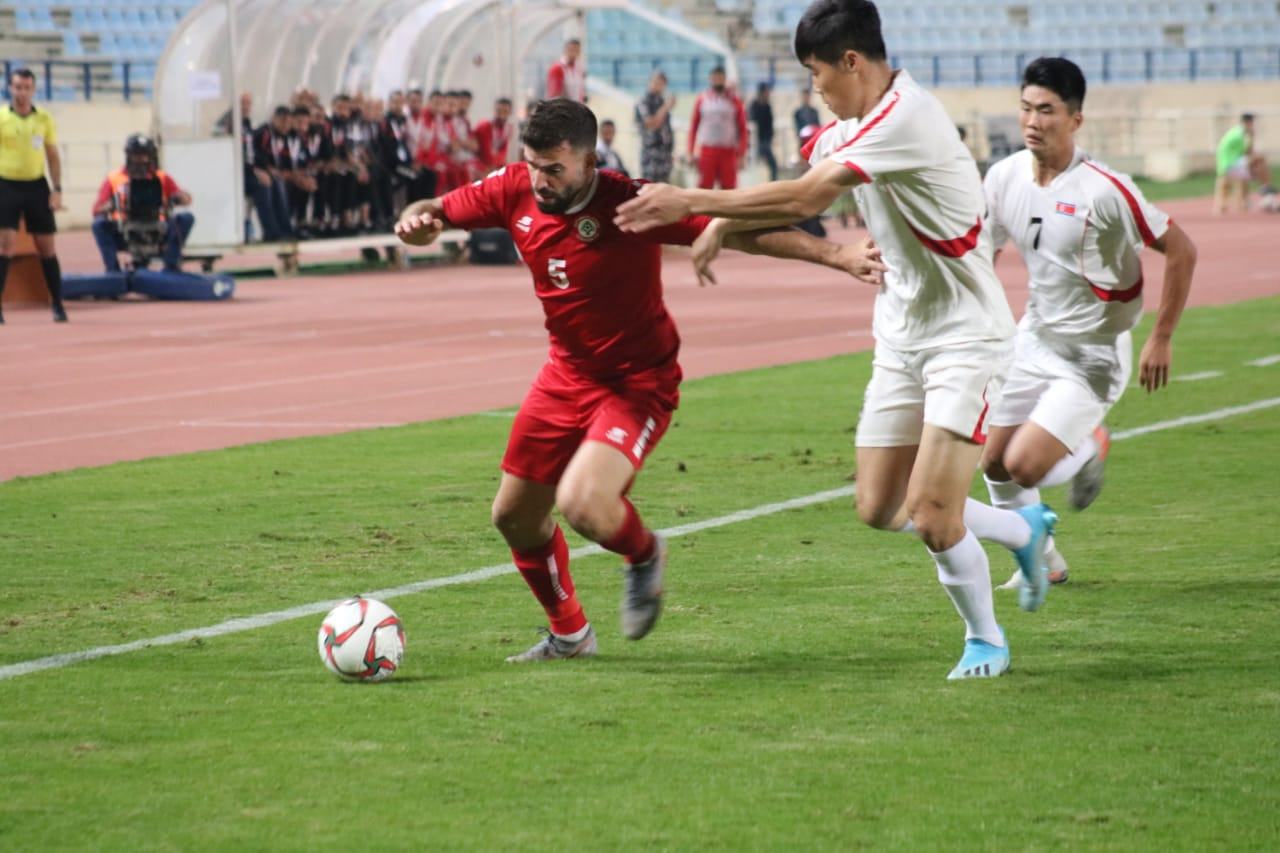
Haidar (left) with Lebanon against North Korea in 2019

=== Norway ===
Haidar represented Norway at youth level, making nine appearances for the under-16 team in 2005 and as seven appearances for the under-19 team in 2008.

=== Lebanon ===
Eligible to represent Lebanon through his heritage, Haidar received his first call-up in October 2012. He made his senior international debut on 16 October 2012 in a friendly against Yemen, a 2–1 victory for Lebanon. He scored his first international goal on 8 December 2012 during the 2012 WAFF Championship, scoring the only goal in Lebanon's 1–0 win over Oman.

In December 2018, Haidar was selected for Lebanon's squad at the 2019 AFC Asian Cup. He appeared in the final group-stage match against North Korea, entering as a substitute in a 4–1 victory.

== Style of play ==
Haidar is a central midfielder known for his physicality, defensive work rate, and ability in possession. He combines tackling and ball-winning ability with reliable passing, allowing him to contribute both defensively and in build-up play.

== Career statistics ==
=== Club ===
As of match played 17 June 2026

Club	Season	League			National cup (Note: Includes Norwegian Football Cup and Lebanese FA Cup)		Continental		Other		Total	
Club	Season	Division	Apps	Goals	Apps	Goals	Apps	Goals	Apps	Goals	Apps	Goals
Vålerenga 2	2010	Norwegian Second Division	4	0	0	0	—		—		4	0
Vålerenga	2008	Tippeligaen	2	0	0	0	—		—		2	0
Vålerenga	2010	Tippeligaen	6	0	0	0	—		—		6	0
Vålerenga	2011	Tippeligaen	10	0	0	0	1 (Note: Appearance(s) in UEFA Europa League qualifying round)	0	—		11	0
Vålerenga	Total		18	0	0	0	1	0	0	0	19	0
Skeid (loan)	2009	Norwegian First Division	9	0	0	0	—		—		9	0
Stabæk 2	2012	Norwegian Second Division	3	0	0	0	—		—		3	0
Stabæk 2	2013	Norwegian Third Division	4	2	0	0	—		—		4	2
Stabæk 2	Total		7	2	0	0	0	0	0	0	7	2
Stabæk	2012	Tippeligaen	24	0	3	0	2	0	—		29	0
Stabæk	2013	Norwegian First Division	19	0	1	0	—		—		20	0
Stabæk	Total		43	0	4	0	2	0	0	0	49	0
Bryne 2	2014	Norwegian Third Division	7	2	0	0	—		—		7	2
Bryne	2014	Norwegian First Division	19	0	1	0	—		—		20	0
HamKam	2015	Norwegian Second Division	17	1	2	0	—		—		19	1
Moss 2	2016	Norwegian Fourth Division	1	0	0	0	—		—		1	0
Moss	2016	Norwegian Second Division	22	1	2	0	—		—		24	1
KFUM 2	2017	Norwegian Fourth Division	2	2	0	0	—		—		2	2
KFUM	2017	Norwegian Second Division	14	3	2	0	—		—		16	3
Ansar	2017–18	Lebanese Premier League	18	0			3 (Note: Appearances in AFC Cup)	0	—		21	0
Ansar	2018–19	Lebanese Premier League	21	1			—		—		21	1
Ansar	2019–20	Lebanese Premier League	3	0			0	0	—		3	0
Ansar	Total		42	1			3	0	0	0	45	1
Holmlia	2021	Norwegian Fourth Division	11	3	—		—		2 (Note: Appearances in the OBOS Cup (Oslomesterskapet))	0	13	3
Klemetsrud	2022	Norwegian Sixth Division	18	10	—		—		1	0	19	10
Klemetsrud	2023	Norwegian Sixth Division	17	6	—		—		3 (Note: Appearances in Oslo Championship (Oslomesterskapet i Fotball))	4	20	10
Klemetsrud	2024	Norwegian Fifth Division	17	8	—		—		1	0	18	8
Klemetsrud	2025	Norwegian Fifth Division	22	11	—		—		2	0	24	11
Klemetsrud	2026	Norwegian Fifth Division	4	1	1	0	—		1	0	6	1
Klemetsrud	Total		89	39	1	0	0	0	10	4	100	43
Career total			307	54	12	0	6	0	12	4	335	58

=== International ===
Scores and results list Lebanon's goal tally first, score column indicates score after each Haidar goal.

List of international goals scored by Adnan Haidar
No.	Date	Venue	Opponent	Score	Result	Competition	Ref.
1	8 December 2012	Ali Sabah Al-Salem Stadium, Al Farwaniyah, Kuwait	Oman	0–1	0–1	2012 WAFF Championship	

== Honours ==
Vålerenga

- Norwegian Cup: 2008
- Tippeligaen runner-up: 2010

Ansar

- Lebanese Premier League runner-up: 2018–19
- Lebanese FA Cup runner-up: 2018–19
- Lebanese Elite Cup runner-up: 2019
- Lebanese Super Cup runner-up: 2017, 2019

Individual

- Lebanese Premier League Team of the Season: 2018–19

== See also ==
- List of Lebanon international footballers
- List of Lebanon international footballers born outside Lebanon
- List of sportspeople who competed for more than one nation
