= Mads Stokkelien =

Norwegian footballer (born 1990)

Personal information
- Date of birth: 15 March 1990 (age 36)
- Place of birth: Kristiansand, Norway
- Height: 6 ft 2 in (1.88 m)
- Position: Striker

Senior career*
Years	Team	Apps	(Gls)
2008–2011	Start	68	(15)
2012–2013	Stabæk	48	(18)
2014–2015	New York Cosmos	38	(8)
2015	Start	10	(1)
Total		164	(42)

International career
2008	Norway U18	2	(1)
2009	Norway U19	3	(0)
2009–2011	Norway U21	13	(0)
- * Club domestic league appearances and goals

Mads Stokkelien (born 15 March 1990) is a Norwegian former professional football striker. He last played for Start.

== Club career ==
=== IK Start ===
Having been an IK Start youth, he later debuted in IK Start's first team squad. He played two games in the Norwegian First Division in 2008. Stokkelien made his debut in the Norwegian Premier League in April 2009 against Aalesunds FK where he was a substitute for Espen Børufsen. In his second game he scored the equalizer goal against Brann in Bergen on the traditional 16 May game.

He also scored in the two following games, including two goals in his first game from start against Bodø/Glimt on 24 May 2009.

The 2011 season was struggling for Stokkelien, as he failed to score a single goal and had his own injury concerns that he sustained in a match against Sogndal. He would be out for six to eight weeks. Following a week out, the club would suffer from bad to worse, as they were relegated to Division One.

=== Stabæk Fotball ===
On 31 January 2012, Stokkelien signed with Norwegian Premier League club Stabæk Fotball and chose number eighteen shirt.

Stokkelien made his debut in the opening game of the season, as Stabæk drew 0–0 with Aalesunds FK. Stokkelien have struggled to score until on 15 July 2012 when he scored his first goal in a 3–1 loss against Sogndal. Stokkelien continued to struggle to score and earn a first team place, as the club went on to be relegated to Division One.

In 2013 season, Stokkelien continued to fight for the first team and aim for promotion to Tippeligaen. In the last game of the season, he scored his 17th goal, in a 1–1 draw against Bodø/Glimt to send the club to get promoted to the next season. After the match, Stokkelien described this as "the biggest I've ever been with as a footballer. It was absolutely amazing". Unlike his first season, Stokkelien made improvements under manager Petter Belsvik by scoring goals and ended up as the club's top-scorer, as well as the second top-scorer behind Jo Sondre Aas. His performance resulted him to be nominated for Division One Player Of The Year.

In conclusion of the 2013 season, Stokkelien attracted interests from abroad, which put his future at the club uncertain.

=== New York Cosmos ===
Stokkelien joined the New York Cosmos, of the North American Soccer League for the 2014 season.

Stokkelien made his debut for the Cosmos on 13 April 2014 against the Atlanta Silverbacks and scored a goal in the team's 4–0 win over the Atlanta Silverbacks.

On 14 June 2014, Stokkelien scored two goals to lead the Cosmos to a 3–0 local derby win over the New York Red Bulls in the Fourth Round of the 2014 Lamar Hunt U.S. Open Cup.

On 23 August 2014, Stokkelien scored a crucial game-tying goal in the 74th minute of the team's 1–1 draw with league-leading Minnesota United FC. That game started a hot scoring streak for Stokkelien who found the net in four out of five games starting from 23 August, with the Cosmos losing just once during that stretch.

On 8 November 2014, Stokkelien scored the opening goal in the team's 2–1 loss to the San Antonio Scorpions in the NASL semifinals.

Stokkelien finished the 2014 season with seven goals and four assists in 27 appearances. He also added three goals in three appearances in Cup play (U.S. Open Cup and The Championship). Stokkelien finished the season as the team leader in goals, assists, and games played and was named to the NASL Team of the Week three times (Spring Week 6, Fall Week 8, Fall Week 10).

Stokkelien parted company with New York Cosmos on 14 August 2015.

On 18 August 2015 he signed a contract with his former club Start.

== Personal life ==
While growing up, Stokkelien says Ole Gunnar Solskjær was his idol. Stokkelien revealed he's planning to study to become a dentist. Due to being a footballer as part of his career, Stokkelien says "I slept about three hours and almost had to go straight from the party to school because I can not get more absences." However, Stokkelien's career as a dentist appear at risk after his uncertain future.

== Career statistics ==
Club	Season	League			Cup		Other		Total	
Club	Season	Division	Apps	Goals	Apps	Goals	Apps	Goals	Apps	Goals
Start	2008	Adeccoligaen	2	0	0	0	–		2	0
Start	2009	Tippeligaen	23	10	3	5	–		26	15
Start	2010	Tippeligaen	27	5	5	1	–		32	6
Start	2011	Tippeligaen	16	0	4	2	–		20	2
Start	Total		68	15	12	8	0	0	80	23
Stabæk	2012	Tippeligaen	18	1	3	0	–		21	1
Stabæk	2013	Adeccoligaen	30	17	3	5	–		33	22
Stabæk	Total		48	18	6	5	0	0	54	23
New York Cosmos	2014	NASL	28	8	2	2	–		30	10
New York Cosmos	2015	NASL	10	0	2	1	–		12	1
New York Cosmos	Total		38	8	4	3	0	0	42	11
Start	2015	Tippeligaen	10	1	0	0	2	0	12	1
Career total			164	42	22	16	2	0	188	58
