= Ville Jalasto =

Finnish footballer (born 1986)

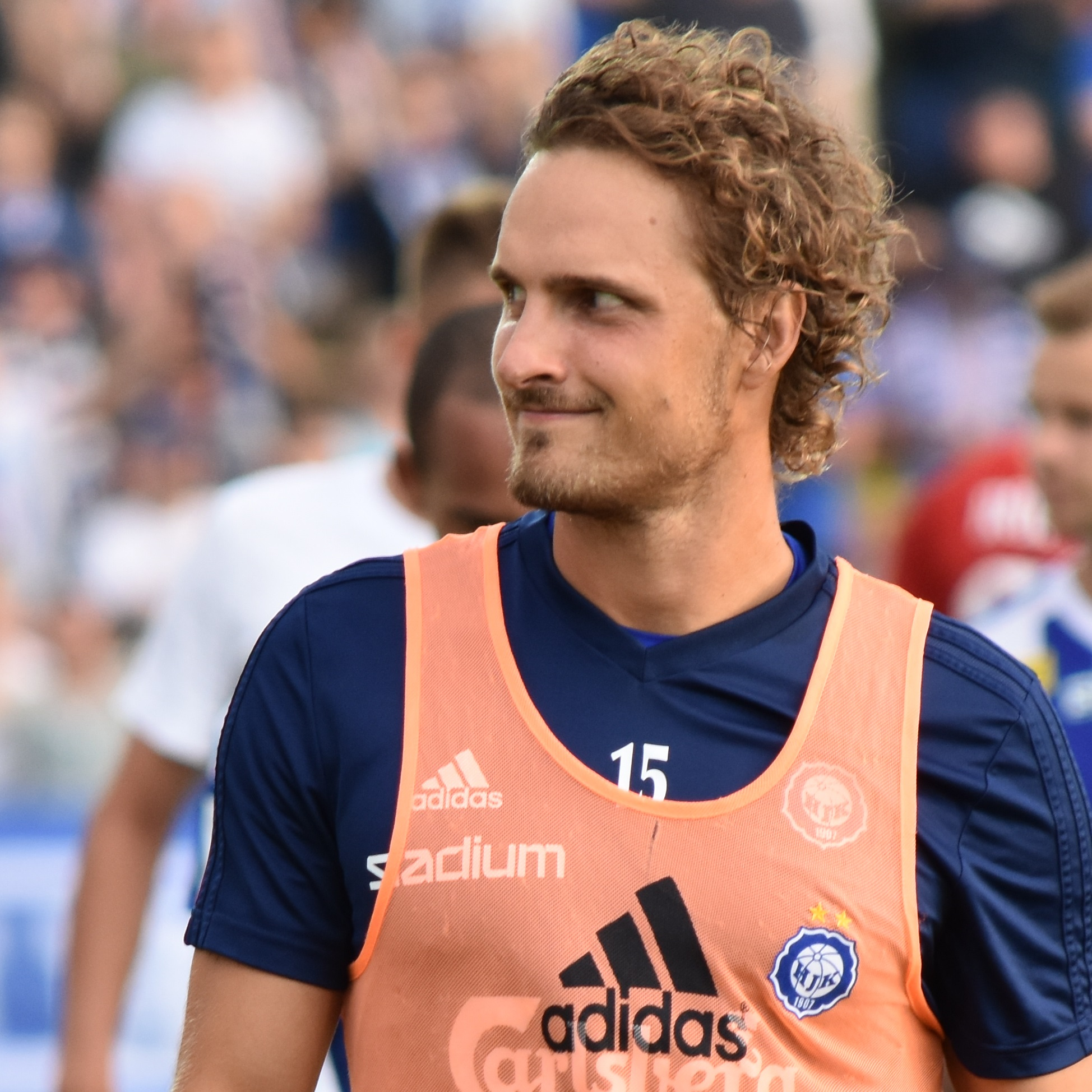
- Jalasto with HJK in 2018.

Personal information
- Date of birth: 19 April 1986 (age 40)
- Place of birth: Espoo, Finland
- Height: 1.83 m (6 ft 0 in)
- Position: Centre-back

Team information
- Current team: Kongsvinger
- Number: 6

Senior career*
Years	Team	Apps	(Gls)
2005–2008	Honka	71	(2)
2009–2012	Aalesund	84	(0)
2012–2015	Stabæk	89	(6)
2015–2018	HJK	60	(4)
2019–2020	Kongsvinger	37	(3)

International career
	Finland U21	14	(1)
2010–2016	Finland	7	(0)
- * Club domestic league appearances and goals as of 26 November 2021

Ville Jalasto (born 19 April 1986) is a Finnish former professional footballer who played as a centre-back. He made seven appearances for the Finland national team during 2010–2016.

== Club career ==
Jalasto was born in Espoo, Finland. He made his Tippeligaen debut for Aalesund 13 April 2009 coming off the bench against Odd Grenland.

In August 2012, Jalasto joined Stabæk.

Jalasto left Stabæk on 21 December 2015, signing for HJK in his native Finland the next day.

== International career ==
Jalasto made his national team debut on 29 May 2010 in a friendly against Poland.

== Career statistics ==
=== Club ===
As of match played 31 December 2020

Appearances and goals by club, season and competition
Club	Season	League			National Cup		Europe		Total	
Club	Season	Division	Apps	Goals	Apps	Goals	Apps	Goals	Apps	Goals
Honka	2006	Veikkausliiga	20	1	0	0	-		20	1
Honka	2007	Veikkausliiga	26	0	1	1	4 (Note: Includes UEFA Intertoto Cup)	0	31	1
Honka	2008	Veikkausliiga	25	2	3	1	6 (Note: Includes UEFA Cup)	0	34	3
Honka	2009	Veikkausliiga	0	0	3	0	0	0	3	0
Honka	Total		71	3	7	1	10	0	88	5
Aalesund	2009	Tippeligaen	23	0	6	1	-		29	1
Aalesund	2010	Tippeligaen	27	0	1	1	2 (Note: Includes UEFA Europa League)	0	30	1
Aalesund	2011	Tippeligaen	25	0	2	0	5	0	32	0
Aalesund	2012	Tippeligaen	9	0	4	0	-		13	0
Aalesund	Total		84	0	13	2	7	0	104	2
Stabæk	2012	Tippeligaen	11	0	0	0	-		11	0
Stabæk	2013	1. divisjon	28	1	4	0	-		32	1
Stabæk	2014	Tippeligaen	21	2	4	0	-		25	2
Stabæk	2015	Tippeligaen	29	3	4	1	-		33	4
Stabæk	Total		89	6	12	1	-	-	101	7
HJK	2016	Veikkausliiga	25	1	5	0	6	0	36	1
HJK	2017	Veikkausliiga	20	2	5	0	3	0	28	2
HJK	2018	Veikkausliiga	15	1	9	1	0	0	24	2
HJK	Total		60	4	19	1	9	0	88	5
Kongsvinger	2019	1. divisjon	16	1	4	0	-		20	1
Kongsvinger	2020	1. divisjon	20	2	1	0	-		21	2
Kongsvinger	Total		36	3	5	0	-	-	41	3
Career total			340	16	49	4	16	0	419	22

== Honours ==
Aalesund

- Norwegian Cup: 2009, 2011

HJK

- Veikkausliiga: 2017, 2018
- Finnish Cup: 2017
