= Thor Lange (footballer) =

Danish-Norwegian footballer (born 1993)

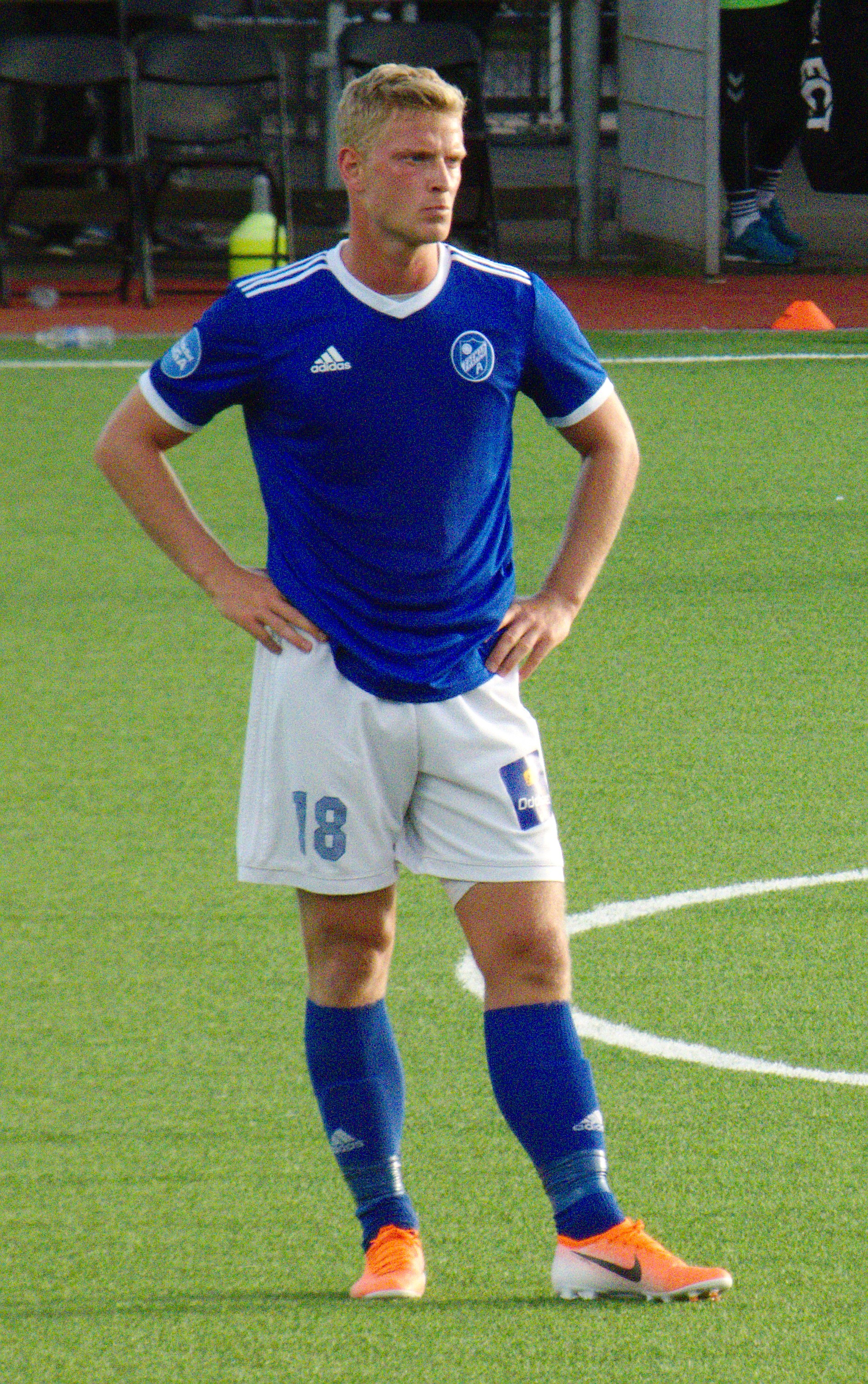
- Lange with Fremad Amager in 2019

Personal information
- Full name: Thor Søndergaard Lange
- Date of birth: 4 August 1993 (age 33)
- Place of birth: Hillerød, Denmark
- Height: 1.83 m (6 ft 0 in)
- Positions: Left-back; centre-back

Team information
- Current team: Haslum

Youth career
- 2000–2012: Stabæk

Senior career*
Years	Team	Apps	(Gls)
2012–2015	Stabæk	6	(0)
2014–2015	→ Strømmen (loan)	47	(1)
2016–2018	Strømmen	62	(3)
2018–2020	Fremad Amager	61	(6)
2020–2022	Horsens	20	(4)
2021	→ Fremad Amager (loan)	16	(0)
2022–2023	Stabæk	27	(1)
2024	Skeid	20	(3)
2025–	Haslum	12	(6)
Total		263	(19)
- * Club domestic league appearances and goals as of 7 June 2026

Thor Søndergaard Lange (born 4 August 1993) is a former professional footballer who played as a defender. He holds both Danish and Norwegian citizenship.

== Career ==
Born in Denmark, Lange grew up in Norway. He joined the academy of Stabæk at the age of 7. On 6 April 2013, he made his senior debut for the club. He spent the 2014 and 2015 seasons on loan at Strømmen, before making the move permanent in early 2016. In July 2018, he transferred to Danish 1st Division club Fremad Amager. In August 2020, he joined Horsens, where he made six appearances in the Danish Superliga. On 14 March 2022, he signed a two-year contract with Stabæk, returning to the club where he started his career.

In January 2024, Lange signed with Skeid Fotball.

In January 2025, Lange announced that he had retired from football to focus on his civilian career. He made a minor comeback in October in the Fourth Division for Haslum.
