= Stian Sortevik =

Norwegian footballer (born 1988)

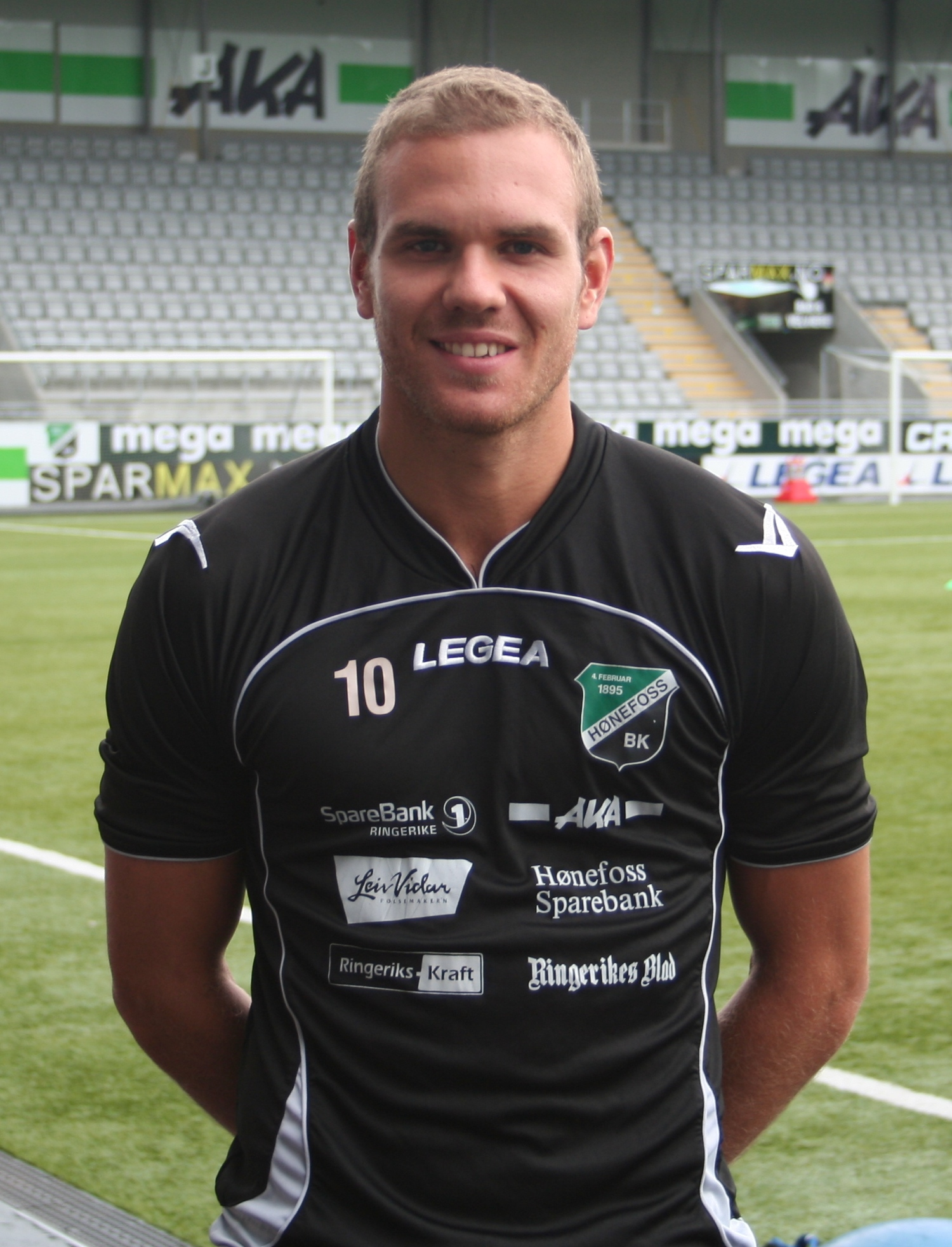

Personal information
- Full name: Stian Sortevik
- Date of birth: 17 July 1988 (age 38)
- Place of birth: Oslo, Norway
- Height: 1.80 m (5 ft 11 in)
- Position: Midfielder

Team information
- Current team: KFUM Oslo
- Number: 8

Senior career*
Years	Team	Apps	(Gls)
2007–2011	KFUM Oslo	154	(54)
2011	Hønefoss	8	(2)
2012–2014	Stabæk	65	(2)
2015–	KFUM Oslo	146	(26)
- * Club domestic league appearances and goals as of 22 December 2020

Stian Sortevik (born 17 July 1988) is a Norwegian football player.

== Club career ==
=== Stabæk Fotball ===
Having previously played for KFUM Oslo and Hønefoss, Stian Sortevik joined Norwegian Premier League side Stabæk Fotball ahead of the 2012 season.

He played on Norway's 2011 World Cup futsal team.

In 2015, he rejoined KFUM Oslo.

== Career statistics ==
=== Club ===
As of match played 13 December 2020

Appearances and goals by club, season and competition
Club	Season	League			National Cup		Continental		Total	
Club	Season	Division	Apps	Goals	Apps	Goals	Apps	Goals	Apps	Goals
Hønefoss	2011	Adeccoligaen	8	2	0	0	-		8	2
Hønefoss	Total		8	2	0	0	-	-	8	2
Stabæk	2012	Tippeligaen	19	0	2	0	1	0	22	0
Stabæk	2013	Adeccoligaen	25	1	4	1	-		29	2
Stabæk	2014	Tippeligaen	21	1	4	3	-		25	4
Stabæk	Total		65	2	10	4	1	0	76	6
KFUM Oslo	2015	Oddsen-ligaen	26	3	2	0	-		28	3
KFUM Oslo	2016	OBOS-ligaen	20	3	3	1	-		23	4
KFUM Oslo	2017	PostNord-ligaen	23	7	3	3	-		26	10
KFUM Oslo	2018	PostNord-ligaen	25	4	3	1	-		28	5
KFUM Oslo	2019	OBOS-ligaen	29	6	4	2	-		33	8
KFUM Oslo	2020	OBOS-ligaen	23	3	0	0	-		23	3
KFUM Oslo	Total		146	26	15	7	-	-	161	33
Career total			219	30	25	11	1	0	245	41
