= Nadderud Stadion =

Sports stadium in Nadderud, Norway

Nadderud
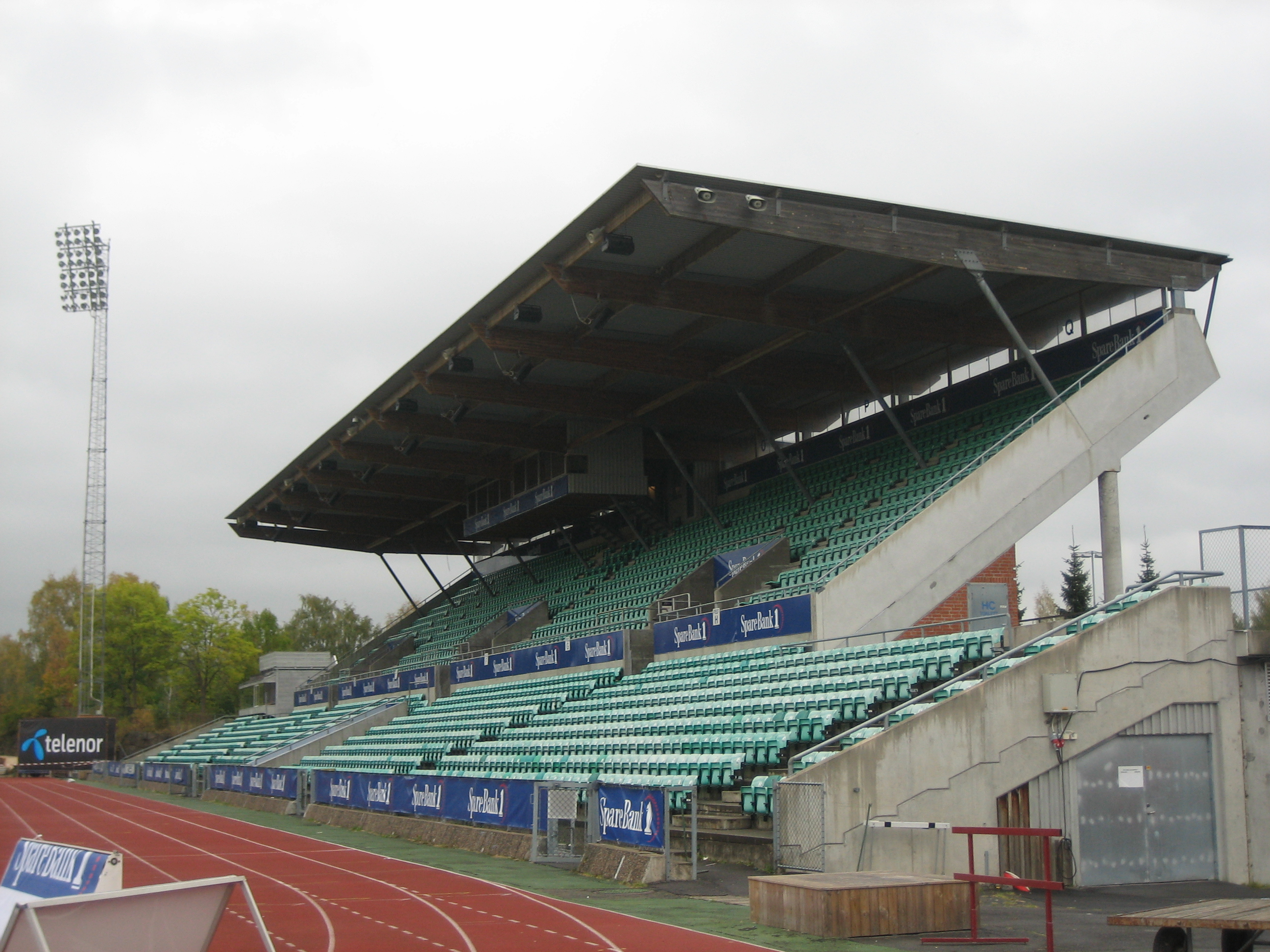
- Interactive map of Nadderud
- Full name: Nadderud stadion
- Location: Bekkestua, Bærum, Norway
- Coordinates: 59°55′16″N 10°34′52″E
- Owner: Bærum municipality
- Operator: Stabæk Fotball
- Capacity: 4,938
- Surface: grass

Construction
- Opened: 1961

Tenants
- Stabæk Fotball (Youth football); Former tenants:Stabæk Fotball (Elite football); IL Tyrving (track and field); Bærum SK (football)

Nadderud stadion is a multi-purpose stadium in Bekkestua, Bærum, Norway.

== Association football ==
It is currently used mostly for track and field meets and football matches, and is the home ground of the Norwegian Toppserien (women's) and Eliteserien (men's) team Stabæk Fotball. Former tenants are Bærum SK. Matches for the U-21 national team has also been played here.

The record attendance is about 10,000, from a 1970 Norwegian Cup match where Stabæk played Strømsgodset. Ahead of the 1996 season, a new main grandstand with seating for 2,900 people was opened, costing 15 million Norwegian krone (NOK). It increased the seating at the stadium with 1,400 seats from the old grandstand. The municipality installed flood lights ahead of the 2005 season. Stabæk moved to Telenor Arena for the 2009 Tippeligaen season, but returned to Nadderud for the 2012 season due to financial issues. In a 2012 survey carried out by the Norwegian Players' Association among away-team captains, Nadderud was ranked twelfth amongst league stadiums, with a score of 2.73 on a scale from one to five.

From 2009 the stadium is the home pitch of Stabæk's women's team Stabæk Fotball Kvinner (SFK), who play in Toppserien, the women's top division.

Before the start of the 2012 season, Stabæk Fotball has moved back to Nadderud and the team's Eliteserien matches will be played at the stadium. This follows a decline in fortune of the top tier team, who were not able to pay for their rent for Telenor Arena past the end of 2011.

On 27.04. 2026 Stabæk moved to the New Nadderud Stadion built adjacent to this old Nadderud. The youth teams of Stabæk will still use this old Nadderud after a small upgrade

== Athletics ==
The stadium hosted the European Cup in Athletics, First League for Men, in 2000. Domestically it has hosted the Norwegian Championships in 1966 (arranged by (IL Tyrving) and 1985 (arranged by (Fossum IF). It annually hosts the country's largest track and field meet, Tyrvinglekene.

== Bandy ==
The Norwegian bandy final was held here on 22 February 1970 when Strømsgodset IF under a heavy snowfall beat Stabæk IF 3–1.
