= 2012 Norwegian Football Cup =

Norgesmesterskapet i fotball for herrer

Tournament details
- Country: Norway
- Teams: 275 (overall); 128 (main competition)

Final positions
- Champions: Hødd (1st title)
- Runners-up: Tromsø

Tournament statistics
- Matches played: 127
- Goals scored: 498 (3.92 per match)
- Top goal scorer(s): Péter Kovács (8 goals)

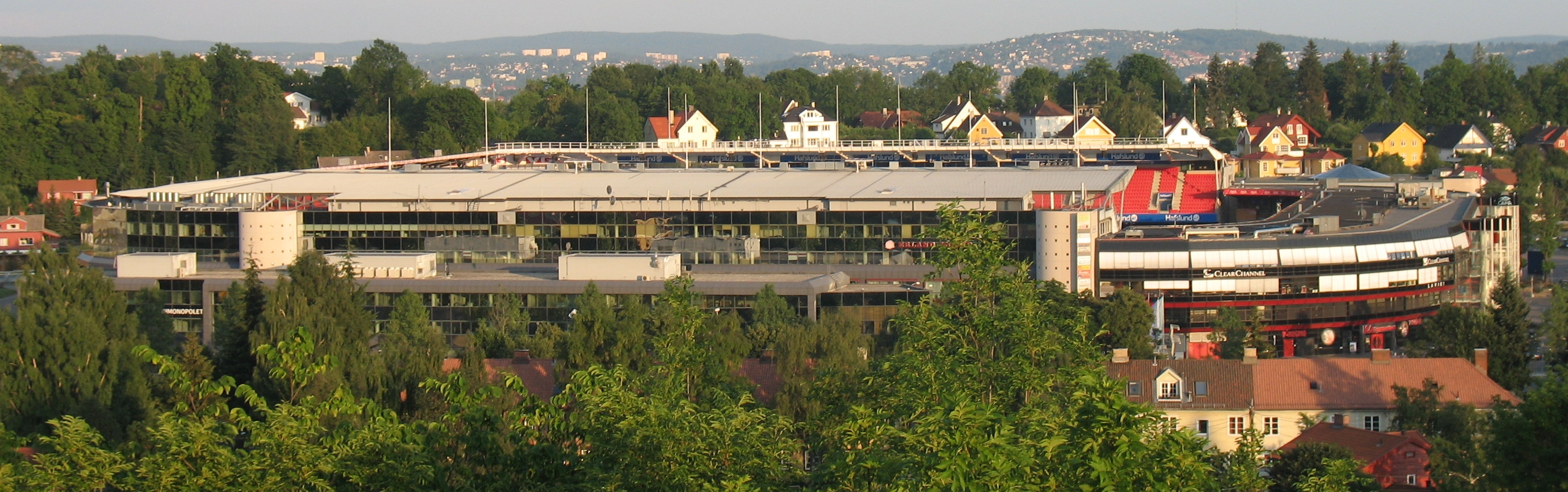
Ullevaal Stadion, Oslo – venue for the Norwegian Cup final

The 2012 Norwegian Football Cup was the 107th season of the Norwegian annual knockout football tournament. It began with qualification matches in April 2012. The first round was played on 1 May 2012 and the tournament ended with the final on 25 November 2012. Aalesund was the defending champions, having beaten Brann 2–1 in last season's final, but was eliminated by Sandefjord in the fourth round.

The victory earned Hødd a place in the second qualifying round of the 2013–14 UEFA Europa League.

== Calendar ==
Below are the dates for each round as given by the official schedule:

Round	Main date	Number of fixtures	Clubs
First qualifying round	9 April 2012	98	275 → 177
Second qualifying round	18 April 2012	49	177 → 128
First round	1 May 2012	64	128 → 64
Second round	9–10 May 2012	32	64 → 32
Third round	20–21 June 2012	16	32 → 16
Fourth round	4–5 July 2012	8	16 → 8
Quarter-finals	18–19 August 2012	4	8 → 4
Semi-finals	25–27 September 2012	2	4 → 2
Final	25 November 2012	1	2 → 1

== First round ==
The 49 winners from the second qualifying round joined with 79 clubs from the Tippeligaen, First Division and Second Division in this round of the competition.

This round saw the top-flight teams Sandnes Ulf and Sogndal eliminated. This was the first time since 1993, when Jevnaker eliminated Lyn, that a team from the top division is eliminated in the first round. 11,273 spectators saw Vålerenga win 2–1 against Lyn, which is a new all-time high attendance for the first round. The old record was 5,625, from 1945. This was also the first time since 1967 that the two teams from Oslo met in the Norwegian Cup.

Number of teams per tier entering this round
Tippeligaen (1)	1. divisjon (2)	2. divisjon (3)	3. divisjon (4)	4. divisjon (5)	Total
16 / 16	16 / 16	53 / 56	34 / 164	9 / 316	128 / 568

1 May 2012	Sprint-Jeløy (3)	0–2	(2) Mjøndalen	Moss
18:00 CEST (UTC+2)		Report	Rønningene 50'; Kirkevold 60'	Stadium: Bellevue stadion Attendance: 313; Referee: Ole-Alexander Ekeli Valen

1 May 2012	Askim (3)	1–3	(1) Fredrikstad	Askim
18:00 CEST (UTC+2)	Yousef 60'	Report	Gueye 3'; Hussain 14'; T. Elyounoussi 88'	Stadium: Askim stadion Attendance: 2,000; Referee: Espen Eskås

1 May 2012	Holmlia (3)	1–3	(2) Sarpsborg 08	Holmlia
18:00 CEST (UTC+2)	Salimi 13'	Report	Ødegaard 25'; N. Solberg 41', 75'	Stadium: Lusetjern kunstgress Attendance: 450; Referee: Knut Ivar Strømstad

1 May 2012	Lyn (4)	1–2	(1) Vålerenga	Oslo
18:00 CEST (UTC+2)	Dahir 73'	Report	Nielsen 12'; Anene 67'	Stadium: Bislett Stadium; Attendance: 11,273; Referee: Torkjell Jonsson Trædal

1 May 2012	Røa (3)	1–6	(1) Hønefoss	Røa
18:00 CEST (UTC+2)	Hovind 90'	Report 1 Report 2	Algerøy 12', 55' (o.g.); Beugre 45', 75', 78'; M. Nygård 87'	Stadium: Røa kunstgress Attendance: 300; Referee: Tore Olsen Hagelund

1 May 2012	Lommedalen (3)	0–3	(1) Stabæk	Lommedalen
18:00 CEST (UTC+2)		Report	Brustad 24', 55'; Kleiven 88'	Stadium: Lommedalen gress Attendance: 2,065; Referee: Kristian Randen

1 May 2012	Skjetten (5)	0–8	(1) Lillestrøm	Skjetten
18:00 CEST (UTC+2)		Report	Pálmason 12'; Toindouba 26'; Sigurdarson 45+1', 52', 73', 82'; Knudtzon 51'; Gabrielsen 90'	Stadium: Skjetten Stadion; Attendance: 2,000; Referee: Sigurd Kringstad

1 May 2012	Høland (5)	0–7	(2) Strømmen	Lillestrøm
18:00 CEST (UTC+2)		Report	Møller 6'; Nkee 22', 27', 45', 63'; Adra 77'; Rasch 82'	Stadium: Høland stadion Attendance: 280; Referee: Ola Skjørli Oterhals

1 May 2012	Hauerseter (4)	0–6	(2) Ull/Kisa	Nordkisa
18:00 CEST (UTC+2)		Report	Jansen 16'; Rosenkilde 23', 42'; Torgersen 36' (o.g.); Dos Santos 61'; Castilla 62'	Stadium: Nordkisa idrettspark Referee: Per Erik Haugen

1 May 2012	Eidsvold Turn (4)	1–3	(2) Kongsvinger	Eidsvoll
18:00 CEST (UTC+2)	Eriksen 75'	Report	Solum 31'; M. Myklebust 45+1'; Moen 90+2'	Stadium: Myhrer stadion Attendance: 800; Referee: Stig Jonny Unhammer

1 May 2012	Faaberg (5)	3–5	(2) HamKam	Fåberg
18:00 CEST (UTC+2)	Ness 44'; Asklien 51'; Moen 72'	Report	Jensen 13'; Nedrebø 15', 37', 83'; Lehne Olsen 76'	Stadium: Stampesletta; Attendance: 457; Referee: Kristofer Leirdal

1 May 2012	Drammens BK (5)	0–2	(2) Bærum	Drammen
18:00 CEST (UTC+2)		Report	Aalbu 63'; Shaswari 72'	Stadium: Marienlyst Stadion; Referee: Ole Johan Eliassen Lillebuen

1 May 2012	Solberg (5)	0–9	(1) Strømsgodset	Solbergelva
18:00 CEST (UTC+2)		Report	Kovács 19', 26', 53'; Vilsvik 33'; Keita 36', 60'; Storflor 55'; Sætra 68'; Konradsen 81'	Stadium: Solberg kunstgress Attendance: 2,200; Referee: Ole-Martin Loeshagen

1 May 2012	Runar (4)	0–6	(2) Sandefjord	Sandefjord
18:00 CEST (UTC+2)		Report	Dimitriadis 34'; Lamøy 47'; Aas 50'; Dieng 57'; Brekke 74'; Ch. Hansen 84' (pen.)	Stadium: Haukerød idrettspark Attendance: 1,043; Referee: Rohit Saggi

1 May 2012	Urædd (4)	0–9	(2) Notodden	Porsgrunn
18:00 CEST (UTC+2)		Report	Dale 26', 31', 51'; Lien 44'; Lundefaret 72', 79'; J. Kasin 75'; Holmen 84', 87'	Stadium: Kjølnes stadion Attendance: 110; Referee: Tim-Nicolai Fjellvang

1 May 2012	Gvarv (5)	0–4	(1) Odd Grenland	Gvarv
18:00 CEST (UTC+2)		Report	Rashani 5', 14'; Pettersen 79' (o.g.); Fredriksen 90+2'	Stadium: Gvarv stadion Attendance: 2,000; Referee: Raymond Nyberg

1 May 2012	Donn (4)	2–4	(2) Start	Kristiansand
18:00 CEST (UTC+2)	Lind 22'; Høgetveit 32' (o.g.)	Report	Tveit 38', 62'; Hoff 81'; Asante 90+2' (pen.)	Stadium: Kristiansand Stadion; Attendance: 1,705; Referee: Espen Larsen

1 May 2012	Flekkefjord (4)	1–4	(1) Viking	Flekkefjord
18:00 CEST (UTC+2)	Klungland 52'	Report	Nevland 5'; Gyan 8'; Anier 25'; Olsen 79'	Stadium: Uenes stadion Attendance: 2,140; Referee: Tore Hansen

1 May 2012	Staal Jørpeland (4)	2–1	(1) Sandnes Ulf	Jørpeland
18:00 CEST (UTC+2)	Dalehaug 38', 45'	Report	Saaliti 26'	Stadium: Jørpeland stadion Attendance: 1,650; Referee: Ole Gya

1 May 2012	Rosseland (5)	1–4	(2) Bryne	Bryne
18:00 CEST (UTC+2)	Monsen 76'	Report	Bright 3', 26'; Fernandes 70'; Helle 90+4'	Stadium: Rosselandsbanen; Attendance: 810; Referee: Ørjan Vikene

1 May 2012	Avaldsnes (4)	1–7	(1) Haugesund	Avaldsnes
18:00 CEST (UTC+2)	K. Boe 14' (pen.)	Report	Fevang 7', 38'; Jóhannesson 35', 46'; Storbæk 39'; Bjørnbak 59'; Anyora 90+1' (pen.)	Stadium: Avaldsnes Idrettssenter; Attendance: 1,182; Referee: Anders Birch Hansen

1 May 2012	Bjarg (3)	1–2	(1) Brann	Bergen
18:00 CEST (UTC+2)	E. Skåtun 30'	Report	Mjelde 44', 62'	Stadium: Stavollen Kunstgress; Attendance: 1,500; Referee: Jan Morten Tennøy

1 May 2012	Voss (4)	0–7	(3) Fana	Vossevangen
18:00 CEST (UTC+2)		Report	Lerpold 34' (pen.), 53', 74'; Birkeland 55'; Engeset 61', 76', 89'	Stadium: Prestegardsmoen; Attendance: 200; Referee: Jon Ophuus

1 May 2012	Florø (4)	3–0	(1) Sogndal	Florø
18:00 CEST (UTC+2)	S. Aase 24'; Solheim 48'; Tansø 75'	Report		Stadium: Florø Stadion; Referee: Petter Kristiansen Toppe

1 May 2012	Spjelkavik (5)	1–1 (a.e.t.) (2–4 p)	(3) Træff	Ålesund
18:00 CEST (UTC+2)	Hagerup 85'	Report	Sandnes 58'	Stadium: Spjelkavik stadion Referee: Karl Fredrik Folge Røsok
	Penalties
	Viddal (penalty scored); Omenas (penalty scored); Hagerup (penalty missed); Skare (penalty missed)		(penalty scored) Sandnes; (penalty scored) Flemmen; (penalty scored) Mundal; (penalty scored) Engh

1 May 2012	Tornado Måløy (4)	0–3	(2) Hødd	Måløy
18:00 CEST (UTC+2)		Report	Klock 4'; E. Heltne 13'; Karlsen 30'	Stadium: Måløy stadion Attendance: 550; Referee: Jonny Skjerven

1 May 2012	Herd (4)	0–1	(1) Aalesund	Ålesund
18:00 CEST (UTC+2)		Report	Tollås 56'	Stadium: Sparebanken Møre Arena; Attendance: 1,200; Referee: Christina Pedersen

1 May 2012	Sunndal (4)	0–4	(1) Molde	Sunndalsøra
18:00 CEST (UTC+2)		Report	Stamnestrø 28', 59'; Angan 78', 88'	Stadium: Sande Stadion; Attendance: 1,523; Referee: Mathias Smehus Kringstad

1 May 2012	Tiller (4)	0–8	(1) Rosenborg	Trondheim
18:00 CEST (UTC+2)		Report	Ma. Henriksen 10', 16'; Midtsjø 14', 69'; Dočkal 44', 48'; Svensson 57'; Strandberg 75'	Stadium: Tonstad kunstgress Attendance: 1,800; Referee: Kjetil Thorsø Hansen

1 May 2012	Kristiansund (3)	5–0	(3) Buvik	Kristiansund
18:00 CEST (UTC+2)	Psyché 5'; Edvardsen 49'; El Haj 51'; Angvik 63'; Tømmernes 70'	Report		Stadium: Kristiansund kunstgress Attendance: 357; Referee: Even Myrheim

1 May 2012	KIL/Hemne (4)	1–3	(3) Nardo	Kyrksæterøra
18:00 CEST (UTC+2)	Zahl 69'	Report	Solem 3'; Holthe 67'; Berbatovci 85'	Stadium: Trøndelag Sparebank Arena; Attendance: 162; Referee: Mads Følstad Skarsem

1 May 2012	Strindheim (4)	1–2	(3) Byåsen	Trondheim
18:00 CEST (UTC+2)	Nerland 77'	Report 1 Report 2	Snekvik 64', 90'	Stadium: Strindheim kunstgress Referee: Kim Rune Østerlie Borgersen

1 May 2012	Stjørdals-Blink (4)	4–2	(3) Levanger	Stjørdalshalsen
18:00 CEST (UTC+2)	Sisic 32'; Stokke 58'; Lillebo 61'; Augdal 82'	Report	Adalsteinsson 8'; Winnberg 86'	Stadium: Nye Blinkbanen; Referee: Pål Jakobsen

1 May 2012	Verdal (4)	2–1	(2) Ranheim	Verdalsøra
18:00 CEST (UTC+2)	Olsen 29'; Kløvjan 64'	Report	Krogstad 81'	Stadium: Verdal Stadion; Attendance: 300; Referee: Thomas Lystad

1 May 2012	Tverlandet (4)	0–5	(2) Bodø/Glimt	Tverlandet
18:00 CEST (UTC+2)		Report	Berglann 32'; V. Braaten 44'; Saltnes 60'; Konradsen 65'; Pedersen 72'	Stadium: Tverlandet kunstgress Attendance: 668; Referee: Tom Gunnar Rasmussen

1 May 2012	Lyngen/Karnes (4)	1–3	(2) Alta	Karnes
18:00 CEST (UTC+2)	Garfjell 48'	Report	Thomassen 21' (pen.); Nikolaisen 24', 81'	Stadium: Geitnes kunstgress Attendance: 150; Referee: Ole Martin Loe

1 May 2012	Porsanger (4)	0–2	(1) Tromsø	Straumen
18:00 CEST (UTC+2)		Report	Nystrøm 36', 53'	Stadium: Lakselv kunstgress Attendance: 599; Referee: Tom Egil Olsen

1 May 2012	Salangen (4)	1–3	(2) Tromsdalen	Sjøvegan
18:00 CEST (UTC+2)	Ratkje 71' (pen.)	Report	Johnsgård 34'; Johansen 79' (pen.); Flaat 81'	Stadium: Idrettsheia; Referee: Marius Jespersen

2 May 2012	Østsiden (3)	0–1	(3) Skeid	Fredrikstad
18:00 CEST (UTC+2)		Report	Keranovic 83'	Stadium: Østsiden idrettsplass Attendance: 150; Referee: Thomas Lilleby

2 May 2012	Moss (3)	2–0 (a.e.t.)	(3) Elverum	Moss
18:00 CEST (UTC+2)	H. Johannessen 107'; Gjestrumbakken 120'	Report		Stadium: Melløs Stadion; Referee: Bård Lindahl

2 May 2012	Follo (3)	1–2	(3) Raufoss	Ski
18:00 CEST (UTC+2)	Markegård 83'	Report	Berg 78'; Senstad 90+4'	Stadium: Ski Stadion; Attendance: 154; Referee: Omar Rafiq

2 May 2012	Oslo City (4)	2–4	(3) Nybergsund	Oslo
18:00 CEST (UTC+2)	Matos 4'; Ibrahim 36'	Report	S. G. Nygård 8'; Fjellstad 45' (pen.), 78'; Enkerud 90'	Stadium: Rommensletta kunstgress Referee: Martin Sleire Lundby

2 May 2012	Kjelsås (3)	4–1	(3) Birkebeineren	Oslo
18:00 CEST (UTC+2)	Knedal 8'; Aoudia 26'; Sveen 55'; Solvang 69'	Report	Ryghseter 82'	Stadium: Grefsen Stadion; Attendance: 194; Referee: Anders Overgård Hauglund

2 May 2012	Ottestad (4)	4–3	(3) Brumunddal	Ottestad
18:00 CEST (UTC+2)	Ottestad 24', 53'; O. M. Hansen 75' (pen.); Stai 90'	Report	Thun 39', 70' (pen.); Granmo 76'	Stadium: Ottestad Idrettspark; Attendance: 283; Referee: Anders Karset Gjermshus

2 May 2012	Lillehammer (3)	3–3 (a.e.t.) (3–4 p)	(3) Lørenskog	Lillehammer
18:00 CEST (UTC+2)	M. H. Fossum 21'; Trondsen 65' (pen.); Tråseth 107'	Report; Penalties	S. Kristoffersen 52' (pen.); Obeng 88'; Brenna 117'	Stadium: Stampesletta; Attendance: 225; Referee: Tommy Frydenlund
	Penalties
	Trondsen (penalty scored); Løkken (penalty scored); Hovemoen (penalty missed); Gjeilo (penalty missed); Tråseth (penalty scored); Breiland (penalty missed)		(penalty scored) S. Kristoffersen; (penalty missed) Brenna; (penalty scored) Achrifi; (penalty missed) Obeng; (penalty scored) Isnes; (penalty scored) Baba

2 May 2012	Gjøvik (3)	1–1 (a.e.t.) (7–6 p)	(3) Nesodden	Gjøvik
18:00 CEST (UTC+2)	Fremo 67'	Report; Penalties	Strøm-Pedersen 63'	Stadium: Gjøvik Stadion; Attendance: 265; Referee: Audun Fremstad
	Penalties
	Stangeland (penalty scored); Krastev (penalty scored); W. Iversen (penalty missed); Leliuga (penalty missed); Fremo (penalty scored); Furuseth (penalty scored); Simenstad (penalty scored); Skonnord (penalty scored); Gram (penalty missed); Olsztyński (penalty scored)		(penalty scored) Velten; (penalty scored) M. Kristiansen; (penalty missed) Viken; (penalty missed) Davidsen; (penalty scored) Bright-Taylor; (penalty scored) Smith; (penalty scored) G. A. Hansen; (penalty scored) Samura; (penalty missed) Haslie; (penalty missed) A. M. Myklebust

2 May 2012	Valdres (3)	2–0	(3) Frigg	Fagernes
18:00 CEST (UTC+2)	Grubisic 70'; Fera 90'	Report		Stadium: Blåbærmyra; Attendance: 295; Referee: Per Erik Haugen

2 May 2012	Jevnaker (4)	2–3	(3) Asker	Jevnaker
18:00 CEST (UTC+2)	Steffensen 7'; Myrengen 73'	Report 1 Report 2	Nicol 21'; S. Solberg 32'; Sakor 39'	Stadium: Jevnaker kunstgress Referee: Kristoffer Helgerud

2 May 2012	Kvik Halden (3)	4–1 (a.e.t.)	(3) Ørn-Horten	Halden
18:00 CEST (UTC+2)	Hermstad 2'; Khattab 96'; Mulac 99'; Eriksen 117'	Report	Belaska 29'	Stadium: Halden Stadion; Attendance: 207; Referee: Mads Andreas Ahlsen

2 May 2012	Tønsberg (3)	1–2	(3) KFUM Oslo	Tønsberg
18:00 CEST (UTC+2)	Malik 62'	Report	Hagen 10'; Hillås 87'	Stadium: Tønsberg Gressbane; Attendance: 228; Referee: Richard Børnick-Isaksen

2 May 2012	Fram Larvik (3)	0–3	(3) Pors Grenland	Larvik
18:00 CEST (UTC+2)		Report	Langeland 58'; Hegna 68'; Joyce 82'	Stadium: Framparken; Attendance: 442; Referee: Espen Hovland

2 May 2012	Arendal (4)	3–2	(3) Fløy	Arendal
18:00 CEST (UTC+2)	M. B. Henriksen 7', 27'; Gundersen 90'	Report	Myhre 13'; Andreasen 20'	Stadium: Bjønnes stadion Attendance: 250; Referee: Ingvald Langemyr

2 May 2012	Vindbjart (3)	3–4	(3) Jerv	Vennesla
18:00 CEST (UTC+2)	Gausdal 14' (pen.), 37'; Myre 58'	Report	Kallestad 13'; Rasmussen 35'; Pepa 69', 79'	Stadium: Moseidmoen; Attendance: 250; Referee: Karl Anders Sletten

2 May 2012	Egersund (3)	4–3 (a.e.t.)	(3) Mandalskameratene	Egersund
18:00 CEST (UTC+2)	M. Håland 65', 71' (pen.), 87'; Grande 94'	Report	Dujaka 54' (pen.); Ramsland 86'	Stadium: Idrettsparken; Attendance: 410; Referee: Ole Gya

2 May 2012	Vidar (3)	0–0 (a.e.t.) (4–3 p)	(3) Randaberg	Stavanger
18:00 CEST (UTC+2)		Report		Stadium: Lassa Idrettspark; Attendance: 110; Referee: Jørn Voll
	Penalties
	Storhaug (penalty scored); Ross (penalty scored); Kindervåg (penalty scored); Lie (penalty missed); P. Midbøe Lunde (penalty scored)		(penalty scored) Våland; (penalty missed) Tunge; (penalty missed) C. Håland; (penalty scored) Melhus

2 May 2012	Stavanger (4)	0–1	(3) Ålgård	Stavanger
18:00 CEST (UTC+2)		Report	Skogen 61'	Stadium: SIF Stadion; Attendance: 200; Referee: Cosmin Dima

2 May 2012	Øystese (4)	2–5	(3) Vard Haugesund	Øystese
18:00 CEST (UTC+2)	Bjørkevoll 22' (pen.); Raunehaug 25'	Report	Stople 9'; Avalos 20'; E. U. Andersen 42'; Holko 62'; Drivenes 75'	Stadium: Øystese idrettsplass Attendance: 250; Referee: Andre Holtar Arnholt

2 May 2012	Arna-Bjørnar (4)	2–1	(3) Fyllingsdalen	Bergen
18:00 CEST (UTC+2)	Rieber-Mohn 38'; Sommerstad 70'	Report	Brevig 66'	Stadium: Arna stadion Attendance: 110; Referee: Asbjørn Farestveit Olsen

2 May 2012	Austevoll (4)	2–2 (a.e.t.) (2–3 p)	(3) Nest-Sotra	Storebø
18:00 CEST (UTC+2)	Storebø 57'; Skår 65'	Report	S. E. Strømsnes 70'; Indredavik 90+3'	Stadium: Austevoll Kunstgras; Attendance: 250; Referee: Kristoffer Hagenes
	Penalties
	Haugland (penalty scored); Skar (penalty missed); Ø. Storebø (penalty scored); F. Storebø (penalty missed); Rabben (penalty missed)		(penalty missed) Kalstad; (penalty scored) Haugen; (penalty scored) Kåven; (penalty scored) Hetlevik; (penalty scored) Essaidi

2 May 2012	Os (4)	1–3	(3) Åsane	Osøyro
18:00 CEST (UTC+2)	Borgen 62' (pen.)	Report	Husøy 1', 34'; Hammersland 90'	Stadium: Kuventræ Stadion; Attendance: 200; Referee: Steinar Hauge

2 May 2012	Namsos (5)	2–5	(3) Mo	Namsos
18:00 CEST (UTC+2)	K. D. Fossum 40'; Modell 90+1'	Report	Råde 20'; Olsen Jakobsen 60'; Meidell 67', 90+4'; Jørgensen 79' (pen.)	Stadium: Kleppen Arena; Attendance: 85; Referee: Espen Tømmervold

2 May 2012	Mjølner (3)	5–0	(3) Finnsnes	Narvik
18:00 CEST (UTC+2)	S. D. Johnsen 44'; J. B. Strømsnes 62'; Torneus 70' (pen.); Schmiel 84'; Harlund 90+2'	Report		Stadium: Narvik Stadion; Attendance: 313; Referee: Geir-Oskar Isaksen

2 May 2012	Harstad (4)	3–2 (a.e.t.)	(3) Senja	Harstad
18:00 CEST (UTC+2)	T. Nilsen 44'; S. E. Jakobsen 61', 101'	Report	Tunstad 16', 19'	Stadium: Harstad Stadion; Attendance: 160; Referee: Stig Are Sørensen

3 May 2012	Skarbøvik (4)	0–0 (a.e.t.) (4–3 p)	(3) Grorud	Ålesund
18:00 CEST (UTC+2)		Report		Stadium: Skarbøvik Stadion; Attendance: 50; Referee: Trond Erik Julseth
	Penalties
	Kjevik (penalty scored); Bjerknes (penalty scored); Rud (penalty scored); Stormyr (penalty scored)		(penalty scored) Ali Essaidi; (penalty scored) Grønhaug; (penalty scored) Lekaj

== Second round ==
The second round took place on the week commencing 7 May 2012. The 64 winners from the first round competed in this stage of the competition. The setup for this round was announced on 3 May 2012.

Number of teams per tier entering this round
Tippeligaen (1)	1. divisjon (2)	2. divisjon (3)	3. divisjon (4)	4. divisjon (5)	Total
14 / 16	15 / 16	25 / 56	10 / 164	0 / 316	64 / 568

9 May 2012	Kvik Halden (3)	2–2 (a.e.t.) (5–3 p)	(1) Fredrikstad	Halden
18:00 CEST (UTC+2)	Mulac 27'; Mehmeti 112'	Report; Penalties	Elyounoussi 69', 110'	Stadium: Halden Stadion; Attendance: 1,580; Referee: Martin Lundby
	Penalties
	Hermstad (penalty scored); Mehmeti (penalty scored); Olsen (penalty scored); Mathisen (penalty scored); Solheim (penalty scored)		(penalty scored) Hussain; (penalty missed) Tveter; (penalty scored) Gueye; (penalty scored) Landgren

9 May 2012	Skeid (3)	0–3	(1) Vålerenga	Oslo
18:00 CEST (UTC+2)		Report	Berre 39'; Zajić 48' (pen.); Laajab 65'	Stadium: Bislett Stadium; Attendance: 2,033; Referee: Bjørn Hansen

9 May 2012	Asker (4)	5–3	(2) Bærum	Asker
18:00 CEST (UTC+2)	S. Solberg 8'; Shipshani 15', 37'; Nicol 64'; Linstad 82' (pen.)	Report	Llullaku 52'; Shaswari 58'; El Masrouri 62'	Stadium: Føyka Stadion; Attendance: 583; Referee: Anders Karset Gjermshus

9 May 2012	Lørenskog (3)	1–2	(2) Kongsvinger	Lørenskog
18:00 CEST (UTC+2)	Larsen 90'	Report	Fazlagić 13', 28'	Stadium: Rolvsrud stadion Attendance: 517; Referee: Stig Jonny Unhammer

9 May 2012	Ottestad (4)	0–2	(1) Lillestrøm	Ottestad
18:00 CEST (UTC+2)		Report	Kippe 13', 29'	Stadium: Ottestad Idrettspark; Attendance: 1,250; Referee: Kristoffer Leirdal

9 May 2012	HamKam (2)	5–1	(3) Valdres	Hamar
18:00 CEST (UTC+2)	Lehne Olsen 11'; Ø. B. Hansen 52'; Bjerke 55' (pen.); Dahle 67'; Jensen 83'	Report	Morgan 3'	Stadium: Briskeby Gressbane; Attendance: 378; Referee: Tommy Frydenlund

9 May 2012	Nybergsund (3)	1–4	(1) Hønefoss	Nybergsund
18:00 CEST (UTC+2)	Enkerud 17'	Report	Mora 25', 53'; Kaland 55'; Magnussen 88'	Stadium: Nybergsund Stadion; Attendance: 202; Referee: Trygve Kjensli

9 May 2012	Raufoss (3)	2–0	(2) Strømmen	Raufoss
18:00 CEST (UTC+2)	Berg 57'; Senstad 88'	Report		Stadium: Raufoss stadion Referee: Audun Fremstad

9 May 2012	Gjøvik (3)	0–2	(1) Strømsgodset	Gjøvik
18:00 CEST (UTC+2)		Report	Kovács 24'; Johansen 45'	Stadium: Gjøvik Stadion; Attendance: 946; Referee: Christian Moen

9 May 2012	Notodden (2)	4–3	(3) Kjelsås	Notodden
18:00 CEST (UTC+2)	Granerud 16'; Holmen 55'; Jenssen 63'; Dale 84'	Report	Sveen 33'; Aoudia 44'; Knedal 54'	Stadium: Idrettsparken; Attendance: 343; Referee: Rohit Saggi

9 May 2012	Pors Grenland (3)	0–2	(2) Sandefjord	Porsgrunn
18:00 CEST (UTC+2)		Report	Aas 11'; Lamøy 59'	Stadium: Pors Stadion; Attendance: 350; Referee: Ole-Martin Loeshagen

9 May 2012	Arendal (4)	0–5	(1) Odd Grenland	Arendal
18:00 CEST (UTC+2)		Report	Güven 7', 75'; F. Johnsen 17', 20', 77'	Stadium: Bjønnes stadion Attendance: 451; Referee: Ole Gya

9 May 2012	Egersund (3)	3–3 (a.e.t.) (8–7 p)	(3) Vidar	Egersund
18:00 CEST (UTC+2)	Dupikov 13'; M. Håland 69', 112' (pen.)	Report	Kanu 14'; Bøgild 20'; Relling 98'	Stadium: Idrettsparken; Attendance: 290; Referee: Ørjan Vikene
	Penalties
	Vigrestad (penalty scored); Binaku (penalty scored); Sleveland (penalty scored); Salvesen (penalty scored); Håland (penalty scored); Koldal (penalty scored); Mathisen-Andersen (penalty scored); Sillaste (penalty scored)		(penalty scored) Maldal; (penalty scored) Ross; (penalty scored) Kindervåg; (penalty scored) C. Midbøe Lunde; (penalty scored) P. Midbøe Lunde; (penalty scored) Bjørnsen; (penalty scored) Kanu; (penalty missed) Randulff

9 May 2012	Start (2)	5–0	(3) Vard Haugesund	Kristiansand
18:00 CEST (UTC+2)	Aas 20'; Kristjánsson 70', 79'; Vilhjálmsson 87'; Søgård 90+6'	Report		Stadium: Sør Arena; Attendance: 672; Referee: Raymond Nyberg

9 May 2012	Staal Jørpeland (4)	1–5	(1) Haugesund	Jørpeland
18:00 CEST (UTC+2)	A. Dalehaug 60'	Report	Skartun 5'; Fevang 40'; Đurđić 53' (pen.); Sema 70'; J. V. Nilsen 89'	Stadium: Jørpeland stadion Attendance: 1,870; Referee: Jan Morten Tennøy

9 May 2012	Ålgård (3)	0–2	(3) Nest-Sotra	Ålgård
18:00 CEST (UTC+2)		Report	Kåven 59'; Næss 69'	Stadium: Ålgård stadion Attendance: 150; Referee: Jørn Voll

9 May 2012	Fana (3)	1–4 (a.e.t.)	(1) Stabæk	Fana
18:00 CEST (UTC+2)	Lerpold 77'	Report	Clark 74'; Brustad 105', 106'; Boli 109'	Stadium: Fana Stadion; Attendance: 500; Referee: Jon Ophuus

9 May 2012	Arna-Bjørnar (4)	0–1	(2) Hødd	Bergen
18:00 CEST (UTC+2)		Report	Karlsen 56'	Stadium: Arna stadion Attendance: 300; Referee: André Knudsen Arnholt

9 May 2012	Åsane (3)	1–0	(2) Bryne	Bergen
18:00 CEST (UTC+2)	Gaustad 61'	Report		Stadium: Myrdal gress Attendance: 50; Referee: Anders Bjerk Hansen

9 May 2012	Træff (3)	0–1	(2) Ull/Kisa	Molde
18:00 CEST (UTC+2)		Report	Soltvedt 5'	Stadium: Reknesbanen; Attendance: 85; Referee: Even Myrheim

9 May 2012	Nardo (3)	0–1	(2) Bodø/Glimt	Trondheim
18:00 CEST (UTC+2)		Report	Johansen 85'	Stadium: Nissekollen kunstgras Attendance: 500; Referee: Rikhard Haugen Lyng

9 May 2012	Stjørdals-Blink (4)	1–2	(1) Tromsø	Stjørdalshalsen
18:00 CEST (UTC+2)	Sisic 84'	Report	Frantzen 45+2'; Drage 68'	Stadium: Øverlands Minde; Attendance: 1,008; Referee: Kim Rune Borgersen

9 May 2012	Verdal (4)	0–2 (a.e.t.)	(1) Molde	Verdalsøra
18:00 CEST (UTC+2)		Report	Dantas 94'; Berget 112' (pen.)	Stadium: Verdal Stadion; Attendance: 1,750; Referee: Kjetil Thorsø Hansen

9 May 2012	Harstad (4)	0–7	(1) Rosenborg	Harstad
18:00 CEST (UTC+2)		Report	S. Iversen 18', 28'; Svensson 19'; Dočkal 27', 74', 85'; Midtsjø 66'	Stadium: Harstad Stadion; Attendance: 3,500; Referee: Espen Eskås

9 May 2012	Tromsdalen (2)	3–2 (a.e.t.)	(3) Mjølner	Tromsø
18:00 CEST (UTC+2)	Johansen 4'; Waage 97'; Arnøy 111'	Report	Vinje 57'; E. E. Nilsen 117'	Stadium: TUIL Arena; Attendance: 381; Referee: Ole Martin Loe

10 May 2012	Sarpsborg 08 (2)	6–1	(3) Moss	Sarpsborg
18:00 CEST (UTC+2)	Hoås 16'; Giæver 36' (pen.), 44'; M. Elyounoussi 52'; Berge 55'; Wiig 83'	Report	Klaussen 27'	Stadium: Sarpsborg Stadion; Attendance: 948; Referee: Omar Rafiq

10 May 2012	KFUM Oslo (3)	0–2	(2) Mjøndalen	Oslo
18:00 CEST (UTC+2)		Report	Karlsen 68'; Rønningene 84'	Stadium: KFUM Arena; Attendance: 168; Referee: Sigurd Smehus Kringstad

10 May 2012	Skarbøvik (4)	0–1	(1) Aalesund	Ålesund
18:00 CEST (UTC+2)		Report	Phillips 58'	Stadium: Skarbøvik stadion Attendance: 1,100; Referee: Trond Erik Julseth

10 May 2012	Jerv (3)	1–4 (a.e.t.)	(1) Viking	Grimstad
18:00 CEST (UTC+2)	Pepa 45'	Report	Nisja 84', 118'; Ørnskov 93'; E. Jakobsen 112'	Stadium: Levermyr Stadion; Attendance: 602; Referee: Tore Hansen

10 May 2012	Florø (4)	1–6	(1) Brann	Florø
18:00 CEST (UTC+2)	S. Aase 77'	Report	Barmen 8'; Ojo 29', 45'; Sævarsson 44', 90+2'; Finne 72'	Stadium: Florø Stadion; Attendance: 3,100; Referee: Steinar Hauge

10 May 2012	Byåsen (3)	1–1 (a.e.t.) (5–4 p)	(3) Kristiansund	Trondheim
18:00 CEST (UTC+2)	Børmark-By 52'	Report; Penalties	El Haj 88'	Stadium: Idrettsparken; Attendance: 212; Referee: Mads Følstad Skarsem
	Penalties
	Hermo (penalty scored); F. M. Johannessen (penalty scored); Dahle (penalty scored); Brandtzæg (penalty scored); Karlsen (penalty scored)		(penalty scored) Edvardsen; (penalty scored) Hopmark; (penalty scored) Fløtre; (penalty scored) Michelsen; (penalty missed) Psyché

10 May 2012	Mo (3)	0–1	(2) Alta	Mo i Rana
18:00 CEST (UTC+2)		Report	Törnqvist 14'	Stadium: Sagbakken kunstgress Attendance: 470; Referee: Pål Jakobsen

== Third round ==
The third round was played on the week commencing 18 June 2012.

Number of teams per tier entering this round
Tippeligaen (1)	1. divisjon (2)	2. divisjon (3)	3. divisjon (4)	4. divisjon (5)	Total
13 / 16	12 / 16	7 / 56	0 / 164	0 / 316	32 / 568

20 June 2012	Asker (3)	2–1	(1) Stabæk	Asker
18:00 CEST (UTC+2)	Notice 53'; Tollås 88'	Report	Haugsdal 78'	Stadium: Føyka Stadion; Attendance: 2,041; Referee: Martin Lundby

20 June 2012	Ull/Kisa (2)	0–3	(1) Lillestrøm	Jessheim
18:00 CEST (UTC+2)		Report	Sigurðarson 12'; T. Kristoffersen 39' (o.g.); Omoijuanfo 77'	Stadium: UKI Arena; Attendance: 3,240; Referee: Brage Sandmoen

20 June 2012	Kongsvinger (2)	0–1	(2) Start	Kongsvinger
18:00 CEST (UTC+2)		Report	Shindika 56' (o.g.)	Stadium: Gjemselund Stadion; Attendance: 512; Referee: Espen Berntsen

20 June 2012	Raufoss (3)	2–3	(1) Odd Grenland	Raufoss
18:00 CEST (UTC+2)	Sveen 16'; Berg 40'	Report	Güven 19'; Samuelsen 35'; F. Johnsen 64'	Stadium: Raufoss Stadion; Attendance: 871; Referee: Omar Rafiq

20 June 2012	Strømsgodset (1)	3–2	(2) Notodden	Drammen
18:00 CEST (UTC+2)	Storflor 45+3'; Kovács 76', 79'	Report	S. Jenssen 14'; Dale 17'	Stadium: Marienlyst Stadion; Attendance: 5,582; Referee: Mads Ahlsen

20 June 2012	Alta (2)	2–2 (a.e.t.) (4–5 p)	(2) Bodø/Glimt	Alta
18:00 CEST (UTC+2)	Reginiussen 64'; Ludvigsen 90'	Report; Penalties	V. Braaten 4'; Khalili 6'	Stadium: Finnmarkshallen; Attendance: 566; Referee: Christian Moen
	Penalties
	Nome (penalty missed); Reginiussen (penalty scored); Törnqvist (penalty scored); Overvik (penalty scored); Ludvigsen (penalty scored); Rolandsen (penalty missed)		(penalty missed) Knarvik; (penalty scored) T. Braaten; (penalty scored) Robertsen; (penalty scored) Edvardsen; (penalty scored) V. Braaten; (penalty scored) Imingen

20 June 2012	Tromsø (1)	4–0	(2) Tromsdalen	Tromsø
18:00 CEST (UTC+2)	Jenssen 48'; Ondrášek 62'; Björck 65'; Lysvoll 87'	Report		Stadium: Alfheim Stadion; Attendance: 1,156; Referee: Trond Ivar Døvle

20 June 2012	Aalesund (1)	4–0	(3) Byåsen	Ålesund
18:00 CEST (UTC+2)	Post 59'; Sellin 76'; Ulvestad 86'; Phillips 88'	Report		Stadium: Color Line Stadion; Attendance: 1,340; Referee: Petter Toppe

20 June 2012	Molde (1)	3–2	(2) HamKam	Molde
18:00 CEST (UTC+2)	Berget 15'; Angan 51', 82'	Report	Gundersen 89'; Solhaug 90+3'	Stadium: Aker Stadion; Attendance: 2,321; Referee: Trygve Kjensli

20 June 2012	Nest-Sotra (3)	0–3	(1) Brann	Ågotnes
18:00 CEST (UTC+2)		Report	Sokolowski 15'; Ojo 20'; Korcsmár 89'	Stadium: Ågotnes Stadion; Attendance: 1,400; Referee: Kjetil Sælen

20 June 2012	Haugesund (1)	8–2	(3) Egersund	Haugesund
18:00 CEST (UTC+2)	Haukås 2'; Søderlund 3', 10'; Sema 22'; Đurđić 31', 37'; Storbæk 49'; Anyora 62'	Report	M. Perttamo 66'; M. Håland 86'	Stadium: Haugesund stadion Attendance: 1,103; Referee: Ole Gya

20 June 2012	Åsane (3)	0–2	(1) Viking	Bergen
18:00 CEST (UTC+2)		Report	Andersson 23', 70'	Stadium: Åsane Idrettspark; Attendance: 854; Referee: Jan Morten Tennøy

20 June 2012	Mjøndalen (2)	2–2 (a.e.t.) (3–0 p)	(1) Hønefoss	Mjøndalen
18:00 CEST (UTC+2)	Karlsen 26'; Kirkevold 103'	Report; Penalties	Mendy 80'; Beugre 100'	Stadium: Mjøndalen Stadion; Attendance: 1,075; Referee: Kristoffer Helgerud
	Penalties
	Kirkevold (penalty scored); Stokke (penalty scored); Gunnarsson (penalty scored)		(penalty missed) Lafton; (penalty missed) Larsen; (penalty missed) Bolseth

20 June 2012	Rosenborg (1)	4–0	(3) Kvik Halden	Trondheim
18:00 CEST (UTC+2)	Ma. Henriksen 32'; Prica 61'; Chibuike 62', 75'	Report		Stadium: Lerkendal Stadion; Attendance: 1,000; Referee: Kim Rune Borgersen

20 June 2012	Hødd (2)	2–1 (a.e.t.)	(2) Sarpsborg 08	Ulsteinvik
18:00 CEST (UTC+2)	Standal 66'; Helland 117'	Report	Giæver 38'	Stadium: Høddvoll; Attendance: 507; Referee: Per Ivar Staberg

20 June 2012	Sandefjord (2)	3–1 (a.e.t.)	(1) Vålerenga	Sandefjord
18:00 CEST (UTC+2)	Gabrielsen 44' (pen.); Aas 102'; Brekke 114'	Report	Pedersen 74'	Stadium: Komplett Arena; Attendance: 1,617; Referee: Tore Hansen

== Fourth round ==
The fourth round took place from 27 June to 5 July 2012.

Number of teams per tier entering this round
Tippeligaen (1)	1. divisjon (2)	2. divisjon (3)	3. divisjon (4)	4. divisjon (5)	Total
10 / 16	5 / 16	1 / 56	0 / 164	0 / 316	16 / 568

27 June 2012	Molde (1)	4–3	(1) Rosenborg	Molde
18:00 CEST (UTC+2)	Angan 39'; Hovland 51'; Hoseth 63'; Eikrem 89'	Report	Prica 20'; Rønning 41'; Dočkal 74'	Stadium: Aker Stadion; Attendance: 7,327; Referee: Tom Harald Hagen

4 July 2012	Bodø/Glimt (2)	4–0	(1) Lillestrøm	Bodø
18:00 CEST (UTC+2)	Robertsen 11'; Sané 15'; Berglann 86'; Knarvik 89'	Report		Stadium: Aspmyra Stadion; Attendance: 2,368; Referee: Kristoffer Helgerud

4 July 2012	Odd Grenland (1)	0–2	(1) Haugesund	Skien
18:00 CEST (UTC+2)		Report	Sema 50'; Skartun 90'	Stadium: Skagerak Arena; Attendance: 2,468; Referee: Ken Henry Johnsen

4 July 2012	Start (2)	1–1 (a.e.t.) (1–4 p)	(1) Tromsø	Kristiansand
18:00 CEST (UTC+2)	Vikstøl 90'	Report	Johansen 43'	Stadium: Sør Arena; Attendance: 3,109; Referee: Svein Oddvar Moen
	Penalties
	Vilhjálmsson (penalty missed); G. Andersen (penalty scored); Asante (penalty missed)		(penalty scored) Bendiksen; (penalty scored) M. Andersen; (penalty scored) Johansen; (penalty scored) Ciss

4 July 2012	Strømsgodset (1)	6–1	(2) Mjøndalen	Drammen
18:00 CEST (UTC+2)	Kovács 26'; Sankoh 42'; Konradsen 52', 63'; Kamara 85', 88'	Report	Kirkevold 73'	Stadium: Marienlyst Stadion; Attendance: 6,045; Referee: Tommy Skjerven

4 July 2012	Viking (1)	2–3 (a.e.t.)	(1) Brann	Stavanger
18:00 CEST (UTC+2)	Veton Berisha 60' de Lanlay 68'	Report	Mjelde 55'; Korcsmar 90'; Ojo 113'	Stadium: Viking Stadion; Attendance: 3,517; Referee: Svein-Erik Edvartsen

5 July 2012	Hødd (2)	7–0	(3) Asker	Ulsteinvik
18:00 CEST (UTC+2)	Heltne 4'; Sandal 20', 37'; Helland 53', 61'; Standal 56'; Mork 63'	Report		Stadium: Høddvoll; Attendance: 733; Referee: Tore Hansen

5 July 2012	Sandefjord (2)	2–1 (a.e.t.)	(1) Aalesund	Sandefjord
18:00 CEST (UTC+2)	Dimitriadis 35'; Lamøy 104'	Report	Morrison 33'	Stadium: Komplett.no Arena; Attendance: 1,512; Referee: Espen Berntsen

== Quarter-finals ==
The draw for the quarter-finals took place on 10 July 2012, and the matches were played on 18 and 19 August 2012.

Number of teams per tier entering this round
Tippeligaen (1)	1. divisjon (2)	2. divisjon (3)	3. divisjon (4)	4. divisjon (5)	Total
5 / 16	3 / 16	0 / 56	0 / 164	0 / 316	8 / 568

18 August 2012	Molde (1)	2–1	(2) Sandefjord	Molde
17:00 CEST (UTC+2)	Angan 83'; Hoseth 92'	Report	Aas 65'	Stadium: Aker Stadion; Attendance: 3,928; Referee: Dag Vidar Hafsås

18 August 2012	Haugesund (1)	2–2 (a.e.t.) (4–5 p)	(2) Hødd	Haugesund
20:00 CEST (UTC+2)	Đurđić 45' (pen.), 62'	Report	Helland 32', 49'	Stadium: Haugesund Stadion; Attendance: 3,124; Referee: Ken Henry Johnsen
	Penalties
	P. M. Kristiansen (penalty scored); Haukås (penalty scored); Søderlund (penalty missed); Đurđić (penalty scored); Strobæk (penalty scored); Bjørnbak (penalty missed)		(penalty scored) Latifu; (penalty scored) Nilsen; (penalty missed) Helland; (penalty scored) Sandal; (penalty scored) Karlsen; (penalty scored) Nyland

19 August 2012	Tromsø (1)	1–0	(2) Bodø/Glimt	Tromsø
17:00 CEST (UTC+2)	Ondrášek 23'	Report		Stadium: Alfheim Stadion; Attendance: 4,499; Referee: Kjetil Sælen

19 August 2012	Brann (1)	4–3	(1) Strømsgodset	Bergen
20:00 CEST (UTC+2)	Jonsson 44'; Nordkvelle 68'; Akabueze 71'; Huseklepp 86'	Report	Kovács 22'; Storflor 58'; Diomande 90'	Stadium: Brann Stadion; Attendance: 7,751; Referee: Svein Oddvar Moen

== Semi-finals ==
The draw for the semi-finals took place on 20 August, with the second-tier side Hødd being drawn at home against Brann, while Molde met Tromsø at Alfheim Stadion. The matches took place on the week commencing 24 September 2012.

Number of teams per tier entering this round
Tippeligaen (1)	1. divisjon (2)	2. divisjon (3)	3. divisjon (4)	4. divisjon (5)	Total
3 / 16	1 / 16	0 / 56	0 / 164	0 / 316	4 / 568

26 September 2012	Tromsø (1)	2–1	(1) Molde	Tromsø
20:00 CEST (UTC+2)	Ondrášek 3'; Årst 72'	Report	Chukwu 83'	Stadium: Alfheim Stadion; Attendance: 5,722; Referee: Tommy Skjerven

27 September 2012	Hødd (2)	3–1	(1) Brann	Ulsteinvik
16:00 CEST (UTC+2)	Aursnes 40'; Helland 66'; Sellin 81'	Report	Korcsmár 17'	Stadium: Høddvoll; Attendance: 6,261; Referee: Svein-Erik Edvartsen

== Final ==
The 2012 Norwegian Football Cup final was played between Tromsø and Hødd at Ullevaal Stadion in Oslo on 25 November 2012.

25 November 2012
13:15 CET (UTC+1)

Hødd	1–1 (a.e.t.)	Tromsø
Sellin 62'	Report	Ciss 87'
Penalties
Latifu (penalty scored); Nilsen (penalty scored); Helland (penalty scored); Sandal (penalty missed); Rekdal (penalty scored)	4–2	(penalty scored) Årst; (penalty scored) Drage; (penalty missed) Johansen; (penalty missed) Ciss

Ullevaal Stadion, Oslo
Attendance: 24,217
Referee: Kjetil Sælen (Arna-Bjørnar)

== Statistics ==
=== Top goalscorers ===
Rank	Player	Club	Goals
1	(Hungary) Péter Kovács	Strømsgodset	8
2	(Ivory Coast) Davy Claude Angan	Molde	6
2	(Czech Republic) Bořek Dočkal	Rosenborg	6
2	(Norway) Martin Haaland	Egersund	6
2	(Norway) Pål André Helland	Hødd	6
6	(Norway) Tarjei Dale	Notodden	5
6	(Serbia) Nikola Đurđić	Haugesund	5
6	(Iceland) Björn Bergmann Sigurðarson	Lillestrøm	5
