= 2014 Norwegian Football Cup =

Norgesmesterskapet i fotball for herrer

Tournament details
- Country: Norway
- Teams: 269 (overall); 188 (qualifying competition); 128 (main competition)

Final positions
- Champions: Molde (4th title)
- Runners-up: Odd

Tournament statistics
- Matches played: 127
- Goals scored: 503 (3.96 per match)
- Top goal scorer(s): Jo Sondre Aas; Frode Johnsen; Vidar Örn Kjartansson; Alexander Stølås (6 goals each)

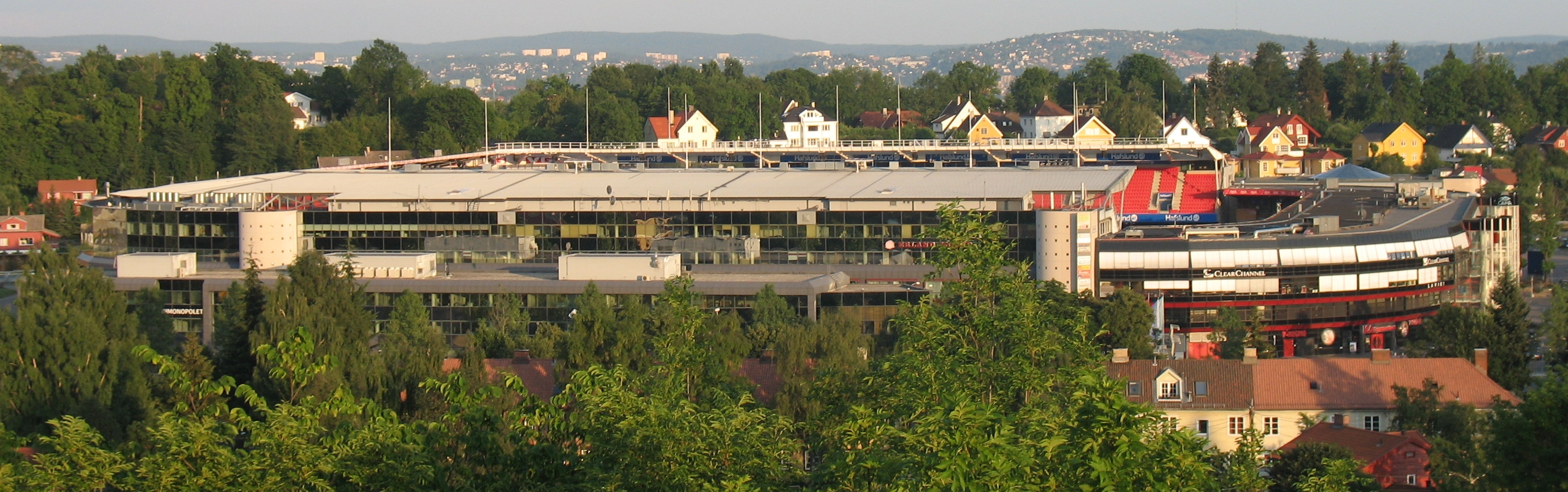
Ullevaal Stadion, Oslo - venue for the Norwegian Cup final

The 2014 Norwegian Football Cup was the 109th season of the Norwegian annual knockout football tournament. It began with qualification matches in March 2014. The first round was played 24 and 25 April 2014 and the tournament ended with the final on 23 November 2014.

Molde won the title after defeating Odd 2–0 in the final. The achievement made Molde the first club to win back-to-back Norwegian Cup titles since Lillestrøm defended their title in 1978. The victory would have earned Molde a place in the second qualifying round of the 2015–16 UEFA Europa League, but since the club already had qualified to the 2015–16 UEFA Champions League as winners of the 2014 Tippeligaen, this berth was passed down to Strømsgodset, fourth-place fininshers in the league.

== Calendar ==
Below are the dates for each round as given by the official schedule:

Phase	Round	Main date	Number of fixtures	Clubs
Qualifying rounds	First qualifying round	12–23 March 2014	94	269 → 175
Qualifying rounds	Second qualifying round	5 April 2014	47	175 → 128
Main tournament	First round	24/25 April 2014	64	128 → 64
Main tournament	Second round	7/8 May 2014	32	64 → 32
Main tournament	Third round	4/5 June 2014	16	32 → 16
Main tournament	Fourth round	27 June 2014	8	16 → 8
Main tournament	Quarter-finals	13/14 August 2014	4	8 → 4
Main tournament	Semi-finals	24/25 September 2014	2	4 → 2
Main tournament	Final	23 November 2014	1	2 → 1

== First round ==
The 47 winners from the Second Qualifying Round joined with 81 clubs from the Tippeligaen, 1. divisjon and 2. divisjon in this round of the competition.

Number of teams per tier entering this round
Tippeligaen (1)	1. divisjon (2)	2. divisjon (3)	3. divisjon (4)	4. divisjon (5)	Total
16 / 16	16 / 16	48 / 56	41 / 164	7 / 312	128 / 564

24 April 2014	Kirkenes (4)	0–4	(2) Tromsdalen	Kirkenes
16:30 CEST (UTC+2)		Report	Lysvoll 62', 72' (pen.), 77'; Johansen 90'; Barlow 90+2'	Stadium: Kirkenes Stadion; Attendance: 207; Referee: Tom Egil Olsen

24 April 2014	Åkra (4)	1–2	(1) Haugesund	Åkra
18:00 CEST (UTC+2)	Rasmussen 38' (pen.)	Report	Stølås 10', 36'	Stadium: Åkra kuntsgress Attendance: 1,050; Referee: Daniel Higraff

24 April 2014	Årdal (4)	0–4	(1) Sogndal	Øvre Årdal
18:00 CEST (UTC+2)		Report	Otoo 2'; Utvik 52'; Hopen 75'; Nesse 77'	Stadium: Jotun stadion Attendance: 650; Referee: Steinar Hauge

24 April 2014	Asker (3)	3–1 (a.e.t.)	(3) Kvik Halden	Asker
18:00 CEST (UTC+2)	Svensson 90+3'; Lyngen 104'; Linstad 119'	Report	Suka-Suka 4'	Stadium: Føyka stadion Attendance: 411; Referee: Fredrik Barth Brekke

24 April 2014	Bergsøy (4)	0–5	(1) Aalesund	Fosnavåg
18:00 CEST (UTC+2)		Report	Latifu 19'; Barrantes 22'; Aarøy 50', 77'; Bjørndal 67'	Stadium: Havila Stadion; Attendance: 1,247; Referee: Even Myrheim

24 April 2014	Bossekop (4)	1–4	(2) Alta	Alta
18:00 CEST (UTC+2)	Holm 5'	Report	Thomassen 57'; Ertsås 60', 90'; Dahl Abelsen 82'	Stadium: Finnmarkshallen; Referee: Peder Andre Amundsen

24 April 2014	Brattvåg (4)	0–3	(2) Kristiansund	Brattvåg
18:00 CEST (UTC+2)		Report	Mendy 10', 36', 44'	Stadium: Brattvåg stadion Attendance: 256; Referee: Per Ivar Staberg

24 April 2014	Brumunddal (3)	1–2	(3) Nybergsund	Brumunddal
18:00 CEST (UTC+2)	Sigtbakken 54'	Report	Nieves 69'; Zaim 90'	Stadium: Sveum Idrettspark; Attendance: 407; Referee: Tommy Frydenlund

24 April 2014	Drammen (4)	2–10	(1) Strømsgodset	Drammen
18:00 CEST (UTC+2)	Krantz 33', 46'	Report	Olsen 15', 50', 90', 90+1'; Sørum 22', 43'; Kovács 65', 75', 90+4'; Storflor 81'	Stadium: Marienlyst Stadion; Attendance: 1,200; Referee: Ole-Martin Loeshagen

24 April 2014	Drøbak-Frogn (3)	1–4	(3) Pors Grenland	Drøbak
18:00 CEST (UTC+2)	Larsen 63'	Report	Naustdal 8'; Enger 68'; Riis 83'	Stadium: Seiersten stadion Attendance: 127; Referee: Ajdin Medic

24 April 2014	Fana (3)	1–2	(4) Stord	Bergen
18:00 CEST (UTC+2)	Hestetun 11'	Report	Alsaker 17'; Hillestad 81'	Stadium: Nesttun Idrettsplass; Attendance: 150; Referee: Svein Tore Sinnes

24 April 2014	Fet (4)	0–6	(1) Lillestrøm	Fet
18:00 CEST (UTC+2)		Report	Omoijuanfo 15'; Fofana 60', 69'; Mjelde 71', 76'; Knudtzon 83'	Stadium: Fedrelandet kunstgress Attendance: 1,505; Referee: Anders Gjermshus

24 April 2014	Jerv (3)	3–0	(3) Fløy	Grimstad
18:00 CEST (UTC+2)	Olsvik 16', 61'; Pepa 87'	Report		Stadium: J.J. Ugland Stadion – Levermyr; Referee: Rohit Saggi

24 April 2014	Mjølner (4)	0–0 (a.e.t.) (7–8 p)	(2) Tromsø	Narvik
18:00 CEST (UTC+2)		Report; Penalties		Stadium: Narvik stadion Attendance: 648; Referee: Marius Jespersen
	Penalties
	Nerbø (penalty scored); Henriksen (penalty scored); Fjellbakk (penalty scored); Mathisen (penalty scored); Schjelderup (penalty scored); Soleng (penalty scored); Juma (penalty scored); Hansen (penalty missed)		(penalty scored) Bendiksen; (penalty scored) Johansen; (penalty scored) Drage; (penalty scored) Antonsen; (penalty scored) Wangberg; (penalty scored) Norbye; (penalty scored) Ingebrigtsen; (penalty scored) Espejord

24 April 2014	Ørn-Horten (3)	2–1	(3) Kjelsås	Horten
18:00 CEST (UTC+2)	Søderstrøm 24'; Belaska 58'	Report	Ashby 52'	Stadium: Lystlunden; Attendance: 115; Referee: Rune Nilsen

24 April 2014	Senja (4)	1–3	(3) Finnsnes	Senja
18:00 CEST (UTC+2)	Johnsgård 84'	Report	Kristiansen 36'; Måsø 43'; Simonsen 50'	Stadium: Senja stadion Attendance: 355; Referee: Vegar Ballovarre

24 April 2014	Florø (3)	2–0	(3) Førde	Florø
18:00 CEST (UTC+2)	Hove 10'; Aase 64'	Report		Stadium: Florø Stadion; Attendance: 1,100; Referee: Jonny Skjerven

24 April 2014	Fram Larvik (3)	6–1	(4) Larvik Turn	Larvik
18:00 CEST (UTC+2)	Dreshaj 6', 18', 22'; Patros 16', 60'; Adžić 88'	Report	Espedal 27'	Stadium: Fram Stadion; Attendance: 1,894; Referee: Terje Rock Rønning

24 April 2014	Frigg (4)	1–4	(2) Sandefjord	Oslo
18:00 CEST (UTC+2)	Abdulgani 35'	Report	Sellin 3', 21', 66'; Kirkevold 69'	Stadium: Tørteberg kunstgress Referee: Thomas Lilleby

24 April 2014	Gjøvik-Lyn (3)	5–1	(3) Eidsvold Turn	Gjøvik
18:00 CEST (UTC+2)	Sveen 5'; Pachu 29', 63'; Førsund 60' (o.g.); Sørum 87'	Report	Økland 47'	Stadium: Gjøvik Stadion; Attendance: 290; Referee: Kristian Konstali Randen

24 April 2014	Grorud (3)	7–0	(4) Lokomotiv Oslo	Oslo
18:00 CEST (UTC+2)	Jensen 24'; Mankowitz 48'; Tekle 50', 81', 89'; Grønhaug 68'; Bunæs 70'	Report		Stadium: Grorud matchbane Attendance: 45; Referee: Ole-Alexander Ekeli Valen

24 April 2014	Grue (4)	0–1	(3) Kongsvinger	Kirkenær
18:00 CEST (UTC+2)		Report	Myklebust 19'	Stadium: Grue Stadion; Attendance: 950; Referee: Henrik Ingwardo

24 April 2014	Harstad (3)	2–1	(3) Medkila	Harstad
18:00 CEST (UTC+2)	Willassen 75'; Nordberg 88'	Report	Norberg 50'	Stadium: Harstad Stadion; Attendance: 656; Referee: Geir-Oskar Isaksen

24 April 2014	Hasle-Løren (4)	0–2	(2) Bærum	Oslo
18:00 CEST (UTC+2)		Report	Jensen 19'; Pellegrino 86'	Stadium: Løren kunstgress Referee: Sulman Maroof Hussain

24 April 2014	Hauerseter (4)	1–2	(2) Strømmen	Hauerseter
18:00 CEST (UTC+2)	Sæther 60'	Report	El Haj 22'; White 81'	Stadium: Nordkisa Stadium; Attendance: 150; Referee: Torkjell Jonsson Trædal

24 April 2014	Aurskog-Høland (5)	0–5	(2) Ull/Kisa	Høland
18:00 CEST (UTC+2)		Report	Anene 14', 42'; Christiansen 17'; Mork 18'; Ahmadi 81'	Stadium: Høland Stadion; Attendance: 250; Referee: Jørgen Haugen

24 April 2014	Høllen (5)	0–4	(1) Start	Høllen
18:00 CEST (UTC+2)		Report	Lind 31', 57'; Tripić 76', 79'	Stadium: Søgne kunstgress Attendance: 3,350; Referee: Espen Larsen

24 April 2014	Fløya (4)	0–3	(2) Ranheim	Tromsø
18:00 CEST (UTC+2)		Report	Voll 45'; Aas 77', 90+3'	Stadium: Fløyabanen; Referee: Ole Martin Loe

24 April 2014	Bjarg (4)	2–2 (a.e.t.) (0–3 p)	(3) Åsane	Bergen
18:00 CEST (UTC+2)	Forthun 19', 32'	Report; Penalties	Gaustad 4'; Lerpold 52'	Stadium: Stavollen Kunstgress; Referee: Marius Hansen Grøtta
	Penalties
	Torgersen (penalty missed); Skulstad (penalty missed); Forthun (penalty missed)		(penalty scored) Moberg; (penalty scored) Tjelmeland; (penalty scored) Østgaard

24 April 2014	Brodd (5)	0–3	(1) Viking	Stavanger
18:00 CEST (UTC+2)		Report	Chikere 12'; Berisha 15' de Lanlay 43'	Stadium: Midjord kunstgrasbane Attendance: 1,500; Referee: Ole Gya

24 April 2014	Kjapp (4)	0–4	(1) Odd	Nordagutu
18:00 CEST (UTC+2)		Report	Johansen 17', 83'; Halvorsen 71'	Stadium: Kjapp hovedbane Attendance: 850; Referee: Tim Nicolai Fjellvang

24 April 2014	Varegg (4)	2–3	(1) Brann	Bergen
18:00 CEST (UTC+2)	Christophersen 5'; Bjordal 31'	Report	Larsen 27', 51'; Vindheim 62'	Stadium: Stemmemyren idrettsplass Attendance: 900; Referee: Kristoffer Hagenes

24 April 2014	Jevnaker (4)	0–8	(1) Stabæk	Jevnaker
18:00 CEST (UTC+2)		Report	Sortevik 15', 49', 62'; Kassi 25'; Boli 35'; Brustad 53', 63', 89'	Stadium: Jevnaker Stadion; Attendance: 668; Referee: Rohit Saggi

24 April 2014	KFUM Oslo (3)	0–4	(3) Notodden	Oslo
18:00 CEST (UTC+2)		Report	Jensen 57'; Skårdal 59', 82'; Holmen 90'	Stadium: KFUM Arena; Attendance: 136; Referee: Knut Ivar Strømstad

24 April 2014	Klepp (4)	1–4	(2) Bryne	Kleppe
18:00 CEST (UTC+2)	Hatteland 12'	Report	Khalili 35', 73'; Vagle 70', 87'	Stadium: Klepp stadion Attendance: 880; Referee: Ørjan Vikene

24 April 2014	Kolstad (4)	3–1	(3) Rødde	Trondheim
18:00 CEST (UTC+2)	Homstad 13', 19'; Bjerkan 45'	Report	Ølstøren 48'	Stadium: Huseby idrettspark Attendance: 420; Referee: Robert Eggen

24 April 2014	Krakerøy (4)	0–5	(3) Moss	Kråkerøy
18:00 CEST (UTC+2)		Report	Rosenkilde 56'; Mönell 72'; Ness 76'; Grønstad 83'; Aguado 89'	Stadium: Kråkerøy stadion Attendance: 750; Referee: Espen Eskås

24 April 2014	Larsnes/Gursken (4)	2–5	(2) Hødd	Gursken
18:00 CEST (UTC+2)	Rekdal 57'; Vik 81'	Report	Shroot 5', 51', 70'; Moltu 10'; Standal 20'	Stadium: River Plate Stadion; Attendance: 866; Referee: Torbjørn Myklebust Krøvel

24 April 2014	Lommedalen (4)	0–6	(2) Mjøndalen	Lommedalen
18:00 CEST (UTC+2)		Report	Gauseth 10'; Arneberg 47'; Diomande 59'; Bernstein 73'; Gundersen 84'; Midtgarden 87'	Stadium: Lommedalen gress Attendance: 500; Referee: Tore Olsen Hagelund

24 April 2014	Lørenskog (3)	3–2	(3) Birkebeineren	Lørenskog
18:00 CEST (UTC+2)	Krogstad 34'; Fellus 38'; Driscoll 56'	Report	Jøranlid 24'; Óscar 59'	Stadium: Rolvsrud Kunstgress; Attendance: 109; Referee: Sigurd Smehus Kringstad

24 April 2014	Lyn (3)	4–0	(3) Skeid	Oslo
18:00 CEST (UTC+2)	Dahir 9'; Brenden 15'; Sistek 34', 76'	Report		Stadium: Bislett Stadion; Attendance: 1,104; Referee: Per Erik Haugen

24 April 2014	Lyngbø (4)	1–1 (a.e.t.) (1–4 p)	(2) Nest-Sotra	Bergen
18:00 CEST (UTC+2)	Kvalheim 24'	Report; Penalties	Skålevik 62'	Stadium: Lyngbø Idrettspark; Referee: Andre Holtar Arnholt
	Penalties
	Kvalheim (penalty scored); Halland (penalty missed); Methlie (penalty scored)		(penalty scored) Aksnes; (penalty scored) Skålevik; (penalty scored) Næss; (penalty scored) Hagen

24 April 2014	Lyngdal (4)	1–2	(3) Egersund	Lyngdal
18:00 CEST (UTC+2)	Sanden 4'	Report	Grande 6'; Leidland 15'	Stadium: Lyngdal Stadion; Attendance: 200; Referee: Rune Akselsen

24 April 2014	Mo (3)	2–1	(4) Sandnessjøen	Mo i Rana
18:00 CEST (UTC+2)	Lorentzen 26'; Jakobsen 58'	Report	Edvardsen 52'	Stadium: Nye Sagbakken Stadion; Attendance: 230; Referee: Tor Anders Johansen

24 April 2014	Modum (4)	0–3	(2) Hønefoss	Åmot
18:00 CEST (UTC+2)		Report	Solli 29', 43'; Beugre 42'	Stadium: Åmot Stadion; Attendance: 490; Referee: Mohammad Usman Aslam

24 April 2014	Nordstrand (5)	0–5	(1) Vålerenga	Oslo
18:00 CEST (UTC+2)		Report	Alba 58'; Fredheim Holm 62'; Kjartansson 68', 76' (pen.), 87'	Stadium: Hallager kunstgress Attendance: 2,001; Referee: Anders Hauglund

24 April 2014	Orkla (4)	0–3	(1) Rosenborg	Orkanger
18:00 CEST (UTC+2)		Report	Mikkelsen 14'; Reginiussen 80'; Søderlund 86'	Stadium: Orkdalsbanken Stadion; Attendance: 2,810; Referee: Mads Følstad Skarsem

24 April 2014	Os (4)	1–2	(3) Vard Haugesund	Osøyro
18:00 CEST (UTC+2)	Kanestrøm 37'	Report	Miljeteig 27', 79'	Stadium: Kuventræ Stadion; Attendance: 250; Referee: Sivert Øksnes Amland

24 April 2014	Oslojuvelene (5)	1–5	(2) Fredrikstad	Oslo
18:00 CEST (UTC+2)	Martinsen 46'	Report	Westgaard 3', 32', 70'; Standerholen 11', 51'	Stadium: Frogner stadion Attendance: 371; Referee: Ola Skjørli Oterhals

24 April 2014	Ottestad (4)	2–4 (a.e.t.)	(2) HamKam	Ottestad
18:00 CEST (UTC+2)	Tronsmoen 20'; Nerheim 63'	Report	Sjølstad 35', 43'; Fofanah 100'; Gundersen 117'	Stadium: Ottestad Idrettspark; Attendance: 450; Referee: Bård Lindahl

24 April 2014	Raufoss (3)	2–1	(3) Holmen	Raufoss
18:00 CEST (UTC+2)	Hassan 23'; Henningsson 74'	Report	Heimisson 24'	Stadium: Raufoss Stadion; Referee: Jo Elias Haave

24 April 2014	Sarpsborg FK (5)	0–11	(1) Sarpsborg 08	Kurland
18:00 CEST (UTC+2)		Report	Kronberg 11'; Zajić 16', 57'; Jensen 20'; Dja Djédjé 22', 87'; Valdimarsson 38'; Brink 64'; Tokstad 66', 88'; Þórarinsson 77'	Stadium: Kurland kunstgress Attendance: 702; Referee: Henrik Andreas Pettersen

24 April 2014	Sola (4)	1–0	(1) Sandnes Ulf	Sola
18:00 CEST (UTC+2)	Eriksen 29'	Report		Stadium: Sola Stadion; Attendance: 650; Referee: Cosmin Dima

24 April 2014	Strindheim (4)	2–0	(3) Nardo	Trondheim
18:00 CEST (UTC+2)	Stokke 25'; Altinius 55'	Report		Stadium: Strindheim kunstgress Attendance: 112; Referee: Kent Ove Westrum Hammer

24 April 2014	Surnadal (5)	0–9	(1) Molde	Surnadalsøra
18:00 CEST (UTC+2)		Report	Svendsen 20', 64', 75'; Diouf 39', 57', 66', 85'; Agnaldo 60'; Hollingen 82'	Stadium: Syltøran Stadion; Attendance: 850; Referee: Mathias Smehus Kringstad

24 April 2014	Tverlandet (4)	0–5	(1) Bodø/Glimt	Løding
18:00 CEST (UTC+2)		Report	Ndiaye 24', 86'; Moe 39'; Berglann 78', 88'	Stadium: Tverlandet kunstgress Attendance: 900; Referee: Øystein Havig

24 April 2014	Tynset (4)	0–1	(3) Elverum	Tynset
18:00 CEST (UTC+2)		Report	Lynum 90'	Stadium: Nytrømoen gras Attendance: 250; Referee: Thomas Solum Lystad

24 April 2014	Vadmyra (4)	0–2	(3) Fyllingsdalen	Vadmyra
18:00 CEST (UTC+2)		Report	Glesnes 5'; Spord 58'	Stadium: Vadmyra Kunstgress; Attendance: 200; Referee: Anders Bjerk Hansen

24 April 2014	Valdres (3)	0–8	(3) Follo	Fagernes
18:00 CEST (UTC+2)		Report	Levorstad 13', 44', 55', 88'; Vestvatn 14'; Bwamy 43'; Rasch 76'; Azemi 84'	Stadium: Blåbærmyra kunstgress Referee: Shervin Enger Heydary

24 April 2014	Verdal (4)	1–5	(3) Byåsen	Verdalsøra
18:00 CEST (UTC+2)		Report	Riksvold 13', 90'; Ollé Ollé 22', 34'; Karlsen 64'	Stadium: Verdal stadion Referee: Kjetil Thorsø Hansen

25 April 2014	Steinkjer (4)	3–4	(3) Levanger	Steinkjer
18:00 CEST (UTC+2)	Sletvold 18'; Taraldsen 73', 89'	Report	Børmark-By 7'; Bartalsstovu 47'; Stensland 50'; Berger 90'	Stadium: Guldbergaunet Stadion; Attendance: 300; Referee: Kristian Aune

25 April 2014	Herd (3)	2–3 (a.e.t.)	(3) Træff	Ålesund
18:00 CEST (UTC+2)	Diallo 28'	Report	Brandal 19', 116'; Markeng 37'	Stadium: Amfi Moa Stadion; Attendance: 100; Referee: Helge Roar Åndal

25 April 2014	Arendal (3)	4–2	(3) Vindbjart	Arendal
18:00 CEST (UTC+2)	Rasmussen 23', 29'; Nordbø 38'; Chopart 90'	Report	Kvaalen 49'	Stadium: Bjønnes stadion Attendance: 334; Referee: Marius Lien

25 April 2014	Ålgård (3)	2–4	(3) Vidar	Ålgård
18:00 CEST (UTC+2)	Grønning 7'; Ravndal 78'	Report	Westlye 36'; Idland 41'; Refvik 55'; Ihle 90'	Stadium: Ålgård stadion Attendance: 532; Referee: Ola Kellerhals

== Second round ==
The 64 winners from the First Round took part in this stage of the competition. These matches took place on 7 and 8 May 2014.

Number of teams per tier entering this round
Tippeligaen (1)	1. divisjon (2)	2. divisjon (3)	3. divisjon (4)	4. divisjon (5)	Total
15 / 16	16 / 16	29 / 56	4 / 164	0 / 312	64 / 564

7 May 2014	Åsane (3)	0–2	(1) Sogndal	Åsane
18:00 CEST (UTC+2)		Report	Nilsen 38'; Brochmann 82'	Stadium: Åsane Idrettspark; Attendance: 100; Referee: Kjetil Thorsø Hansen

7 May 2014	Bærum (2)	3–4 (a.e.t.)	(3) Lyn	Sandvika
18:00 CEST (UTC+2)	Tollås 15'; Kosi Nervold 29'; Benmoussa 57'	Report	Isaksen 8', 112' (pen.); Sereba 17'; Sistek 79'	Stadium: Sandvika Stadion; Attendance: 270; Referee: Tommy Frydenlund

7 May 2014	Byåsen (3)	1–3	(2) Kristiansund	Trondheim
18:00 CEST (UTC+2)	Haugen 41'	Report	Torske 30'; Økland 32'; Mendy 90'	Stadium: Byåsen Arena; Attendance: 115; Referee: Rikhard Haugen Lyng

7 May 2014	Egersund (3)	3–2 (a.e.t.)	(3) Arendal	Egersund
18:00 CEST (UTC+2)	Perttamo 74', 95'; Leidland 91'	Report	Henriksen 22'; Håbestad 98'	Stadium: Idrettsparken; Attendance: 410; Referee: Ola Kellerhals

7 May 2014	Finnsnes (3)	2–2 (a.e.t.) (2–4 p)	(2) Tromsø	Finnsnes
18:00 CEST (UTC+2)	Andreassen 22'; Simonsen 52' (pen.)	Report; Penalties	Bendiksen 4' (pen.), 55' (pen.)	Stadium: Finnsnes Stadium; Attendance: 545; Referee: Vegar Ballovarre
	Penalties
	Andreassen (penalty missed); M. Olsen (penalty missed); Simonsen (penalty scored); Schjetne (penalty scored)		(penalty scored) Bendiksen; (penalty scored) J. Johansen; (penalty missed) Johnsen; (penalty scored) Ingebrigtsen; (penalty scored) Moldskred

7 May 2014	Follo (3)	1–0	(2) Fredrikstad	Ski
18:00 CEST (UTC+2)	Rasch 38'	Report		Stadium: Ski Stadion; Attendance: 451; Referee: Anders Overgård Hauglund

7 May 2014	Hødd (2)	1–5	(3) Florø	Ulsteinvik
18:00 CEST (UTC+2)	Standal 15'	Report	Sørensen 10'; Ryland 50', 84'; Solheim-Olsen 65'; Husa 81'	Stadium: Høddvoll Stadion; Attendance: 606; Referee: Mathias Smehus Kringstad

7 May 2014	Hønefoss (2)	1–2	(3) Grorud	Hønefoss
18:00 CEST (UTC+2)	Hæstad 62'	Report	Bunæs 12'; Akinyemi 87'	Stadium: AKA Arena; Attendance: 270; Referee: Mads Andreas Ahlsen

7 May 2014	Jerv (3)	1–2	(1) Start	Grimstad
18:00 CEST (UTC+2)	Pepa 16'	Report	Andersen 74'; Castro 90+7'	Stadium: Levermyr stadion Referee: Rohit Saggi

7 May 2014	Kolstad (4)	2–10	(1) Rosenborg	Trondheim
18:00 CEST (UTC+2)	Bjerkan 47'; Mosbakk 76'	Report	Chibuike 24', 34', 49', 84'; Bille Nielsen 26', 31', 39', 51'; Helland 59', 65'	Stadium: Huseby idrettspark Attendance: 1,750; Referee: Robert Eggen

7 May 2014	Kongsvinger (3)	5–3 (a.e.t.)	(2) Alta	Kongsvinger
18:00 CEST (UTC+2)	Myklebust 3', 15'; Ovlien 42'; Røer 99'; Ajeti 116'	Report	Reginiussen 25'; Tolk Solberg 53'; Thomassen 78' (pen.)	Stadium: Gjemselund Stadion; Attendance: 238; Referee: Torkjell Jonsson Trædal

7 May 2014	Lørenskog (3)	0–1	(1) Sarpsborg 08	Lørenskog
18:00 CEST (UTC+2)		Report	Þórarinsson 75'	Stadium: Rolvsrud Stadion; Attendance: 293; Referee: Bjørn Hansen

7 May 2014	Mo (3)	1–3	(1) Bodø/Glimt	Mo i Rana
18:00 CEST (UTC+2)	N.Bakksjø 78'	Report	N'Diaye 9', 17'; Konradsen 88'	Stadium: Moheia Kunstgress; Attendance: 850; Referee: Peder Andre Amundsen

7 May 2014	Moss (3)	0–5	(1) Lillestrøm	Moss
18:00 CEST (UTC+2)		Report	Moen 3' (pen.), 27'; Høiland 6', 87'; Mjelde 15'	Stadium: Melløs Stadion; Attendance: 585; Referee: Espen Eskås

7 May 2014	Nest-Sotra (2)	1–2 (a.e.t.)	(3) Fyllingsdalen	Ågotnes
18:00 CEST (UTC+2)	Kalve 21'	Report	Hafsås 84' (pen.); Kåven 117'	Stadium: Ågotnes Stadion; Attendance: 279; Referee: Svein Tore Sinnes

7 May 2014	Notodden (3)	3–2 (a.e.t.)	(2) Sandefjord	Notodden
18:00 CEST (UTC+2)	Gustavsen 4'; Holmen 27'; Brekke 107'	Report	Søderlund 47'; Sellin 69'	Stadium: Idrettsparken; Attendance: 412; Referee: Ole-Martin Loeshagen

7 May 2014	Nybergsund (3)	0–0 (a.e.t.) (3–4 p)	(2) HamKam	Nybergsund
18:00 CEST (UTC+2)		Report		Stadium: Nybergsund Stadion; Attendance: 211; Referee: Ajdin Medic
	Penalties
	Martin (penalty missed); Trstena (penalty scored); Zaim (penalty scored); Brenden (penalty missed); Gustavsen (penalty scored)		(penalty scored) Idris; (penalty scored) T. Hagen; (penalty scored) Aalmen; (penalty missed) Psyché; (penalty scored) Gundersen

7 May 2014	Ørn-Horten (3)	1–2 (a.e.t.)	(1) Strømsgodset	Horten
18:00 CEST (UTC+2)	Vordahl 42'	Report	Kovács 61', 113'	Stadium: Lystlunden; Attendance: 615; Referee: Anders Gjermshus

7 May 2014	Pors Grenland (3)	0–1	(2) Mjøndalen	Porsgrunn
18:00 CEST (UTC+2)		Report	Gauseth 44'	Stadium: Pors Stadion; Attendance: 207; Referee: Marius Lien

7 May 2014	Stord (4)	1–2	(1) Brann	Stord
18:00 CEST (UTC+2)	T.Skaar 12'	Report	Larsen 48'; Lorentzen 52'	Stadium: Stord Stadium; Attendance: 1,974; Referee: Kai Erik Steen

7 May 2014	Strindheim (4)	0–1	(1) Molde	Trondheim
18:00 CEST (UTC+2)		Report	Chukwu 90+3'	Stadium: Strindheim Kunstgress; Attendance: 112; Referee: Kim Rune Borgersen

7 May 2014	Strømmen (2)	3–0	(3) Asker	Strømmen
18:00 CEST (UTC+2)	Agwuocha 10'; Dragsnes 44', 80'	Report		Stadium: Strømmen Stadion; Attendance: 122; Referee: Kristian Konstali Randen

7 May 2014	Træff (3)	0–3	(1) Aalesund	Molde
18:00 CEST (UTC+2)		Report	Stewart 53'; Barrantes 63'; Matland 73'	Stadium: Reknesbanen; Referee: Kjetil Hansen Thorsø

7 May 2014	Tromsdalen (2)	1–1 (a.e.t.) (6–5 p)	(3) Harstad	Tromsdalen
18:00 CEST (UTC+2)	Sletvold 9'	Report; Penalties	Jørgensen 77'	Stadium: TUIL Arena; Attendance: 525; Referee: Ole Martin Loe
	Penalties
	Lysvoll (penalty scored); Kristoffersen (penalty scored); Rinde (penalty missed); Kjæve (penalty scored); Vik (penalty scored); Johansen (penalty scored); Sletvold (penalty scored)		(penalty scored) Jakobsen; (penalty missed) Nordberg; (penalty scored) Ingebrigtsen; (penalty scored) Johansen; (penalty scored) Willassen; (penalty scored) Kozica; (penalty missed) Eira

7 May 2014	Ull/Kisa (2)	2–1	(3) Gjøvik-Lyn	Jessheim
18:00 CEST (UTC+2)	Anene 16'; Giæver 86' (pen.)	Report	Urrang 7'	Stadium: UKI Arena; Attendance: 60; Referee: Knut Ivar Strømstad

7 May 2014	Vard Haugesund (3)	1–0 (a.e.t.)	(2) Bryne	Haugesund
18:00 CEST (UTC+2)	Powell 101'	Report		Stadium: Haugesund Stadion; Referee: Ørjan Vikene

7 May 2014	Vidar (3)	2–3	(1) Haugesund	Stavanger
18:00 CEST (UTC+2)	Herrem 15', 66'	Report	Bjørnbak 48'; Stølås 51'; Myrestam 81'	Stadium: Lassa idrettspark Attendance: 300; Referee: Ole Gya

8 May 2014	Elverum (3)	2–3	(1) Vålerenga	Elverum
18:00 CEST (UTC+2)	P.Nersveen 81'; L.Kleiven 82'	Report	Holm 52'; S.Nilsen 79'; Kjartansson 90+2'	Stadium: Sentralidrettsplassen; Attendance: 810; Referee: Christian Moen

8 May 2014	Fram Larvik (3)	2–4 (a.e.t.)	(1) Odd	Larvik
18:00 CEST (UTC+2)	Pietroń 71'; Adžić 104'	Report	Shala 75'; Johnsen 97', 103'; Storbæk 100'	Stadium: Fram Stadion; Attendance: 994; Referee: Espen Larsen

8 May 2014	Ranheim (2)	6–2	(3) Levanger	Trondheim
18:00 CEST (UTC+2)	Løkberg 7'; Aas 12', 42', 85'; Snekvik 50', 68'	Report	Stokke 3'; Børmark-By 39'	Stadium: DnB Arena; Attendance: 260; Referee: Thomas Solum Lystad

8 May 2014	Raufoss (3)	1–2	(1) Stabæk	Raufoss
18:00 CEST (UTC+2)	Lekaj 70'	Report	Thorsby 27'; Kassi 30'	Stadium: Raufoss Stadion; Referee: Per Erik Haugen

8 May 2014	Sola (4)	1–7	(1) Viking	Sola
18:00 CEST (UTC+2)	Kanu 65'	Report	Chikere 15', 53'; Sverrisson 23', 47'; Landu-Landu 29'; Ingason 33'; Hummervoll 88'	Stadium: Sola Stadium; Attendance: 1,273; Referee: Daniel Higraff

== Third round ==
The 32 winners from the Second Round took part in this stage of the competition. These matches took place on 28 May, 4 and 5 June 2014.

Number of teams per tier entering this round
Tippeligaen (1)	1. divisjon (2)	2. divisjon (3)	3. divisjon (4)	4. divisjon (5)	Total
14 / 16	9 / 16	9 / 56	0 / 164	0 / 312	32 / 564

28 May 2014	Grorud (3)	0–3 (a.e.t.)	(1) Stabæk	Oslo
18:00 CEST (UTC+2)		Report	Dahle 110'; Kassi 114'; Adu 117' (pen.)	Stadium: Grorud Matchbane; Attendance: 360; Referee: Ola Hobber Nilsen

4 June 2014	Egersund (3)	0–3	(1) Viking	Egersund
18:00 CEST (UTC+2)		Report	Þorsteinsson 12'; Sverrisson 25'; Berisha 76'	Stadium: Idrettsparken; Attendance: 1,520; Referee: Ole Gya

4 June 2014	Florø (3)	1–2	(1) Molde	Florø
18:00 CEST (UTC+2)	S.Aase 25'	Report	Toivio 8'; Hestad 61'	Stadium: Florø Stadion; Attendance: 2,150; Referee: Tommy Skjerven

4 June 2014	Kristiansund (2)	0–1	(1) Aalesund	Kristiansund
18:00 CEST (UTC+2)		Report	Phillips 77'	Stadium: Atlanten Stadion; Attendance: 2,200; Referee: Dag Vidar Hafsås

4 June 2014	Lillestrøm (1)	4–1	(3) Kongsvinger	Lillestrøm
18:00 CEST (UTC+2)	Mjelde 34', 90'; Moen 51'; Høiland 74'	Report	Myklebust 60'	Stadium: Åråsen Stadion; Attendance: 902; Referee: Trygve Kjensli

4 June 2014	Mjøndalen (2)	1–0	(2) Ull/Kisa	Mjøndalen
18:00 CEST (UTC+2)	Semb Aasmundsen 38'	Report		Stadium: Mjøndalen Stadion; Referee: Anders Karset Gjermshus

4 June 2014	Notodden (3)	0–4	(1) Odd	Notodden
18:00 CEST (UTC+2)		Report	Bentley 5'; Nordkvelle 35'; Halvorsen 45', 48'	Stadium: Notodden Stadion; Attendance: 1,567; Referee: Ken Henry Johnsen

4 June 2014	Rosenborg (1)	3–4 (a.e.t.)	(2) Ranheim	Trondheim
18:00 CEST (UTC+2)	Gamst Pedersen 40'; Bille Nielsen 44'; Svensson 98'	Report	Åsen 59'; Aas 81'; Bye 101', 107'	Stadium: Lerkendal Stadion; Attendance: 4,881; Referee: Per Ivar Staberg

4 June 2014	Sarpsborg 08 (1)	2–0	(3) Follo	Sarpsborg
18:00 CEST (UTC+2)	Dja Djédjé 16'; Wiig 18'	Report		Stadium: Sarpsborg Stadion; Attendance: 1,224; Referee: Svein-Erik Edvartsen

4 June 2014	Sogndal (2)	3–0	(2) Strømmen	Sogndalsfjøra
18:00 CEST (UTC+2)	Otoo 47', 66'; Nilsen 52'	Report		Stadium: Fosshaugane Campus; Attendance: 518; Referee: Kai Erik Steen

4 June 2014	Start (1)	4–0	(3) Vard Haugesund	Kristiansand
18:00 CEST (UTC+2)	Vilhjálmsson 4', 88'; Acosta 33'; Castro 79'	Report		Stadium: Sør Arena; Attendance: 944; Referee: Kristoffer Helgerud

4 June 2014	Tromsdalen (2)	4–2 (a.e.t.)	(1) Strømsgodset	Tromsdalen
18:00 CEST (UTC+2)	Sletvold 28'; Råde 92', 116'; Mienna 113'	Report	Lehne Olsen 52'; Ovenstad 115'	Stadium: TUIL Arena; Attendance: 1,089; Referee: Tom Harald Hagen

4 June 2014	Fyllingsdalen (3)	1–3	(1) Brann	Bergen
18:05 CEST (UTC+2)	E.Kampenes 4'	Report	Askar 54'; Orlov 71'; Huseklepp 90'	Stadium: Varden Amfi; Attendance: 3,798; Referee: Jan Morten Tennøy

4 June 2014	Vålerenga (1)	5–2	(3) Lyn	Oslo
19:00 CEST (UTC+2)	Berre 16'; S.Nilsen 21', 87'; Kjartansson 75', 81'	Report	F.Badou Jor 76'; M.Cham 90+3'	Stadium: Ullevaal Stadion; Attendance: 7,387; Referee: Omar Rafiq

5 June 2014	HamKam (2)	0–1	(1) Haugesund	Hamar
18:00 CEST (UTC+2)		Report	Nilsen 74'	Stadium: Briskeby Arena; Attendance: 695; Referee: Espen Eskås

5 June 2014	Tromsø (2)	1–2	(1) Bodø/Glimt	Tromsø
18:00 CEST (UTC+2)	Espejord 15'	Report	Olsen 45'; Sané 64'	Stadium: Alfheim Stadion; Attendance: 3,530; Referee: Espen Berntsen

== Fourth round ==
The 16 winners from the Third Round took part in this stage of the competition.

Number of teams per tier entering this round
Tippeligaen (1)	1. divisjon (2)	2. divisjon (3)	3. divisjon (4)	4. divisjon (5)	Total
13 / 16	3 / 16	0 / 56	0 / 164	0 / 312	16 / 564

27 June 2014	Haugesund (1)	5–0	(2) Tromsdalen	Haugesund
19:00 CEST (UTC+2)	Cvetinović 7'; Stølås 20', 24', 77'; Gytkjær 57'	Report		Stadium: Haugesund Stadion; Attendance: 2,715; Referee: Trond Ivar Døvle

27 June 2014	Molde (1)	4–1	(2) Mjøndalen	Molde
19:00 CEST (UTC+2)	Gulbrandsen 11'; Elyounoussi 31'; Chima 41', 79'	Report	Bakken 88'	Stadium: Aker Stadion; Attendance: 3,682; Referee: Trygve Kjensli

27 June 2014	Odd (1)	3–2	(1) Vålerenga	Skien
19:00 CEST (UTC+2)	Johnsen 51', 58'; Akabueze 90' (pen.)	Report	Høgh 68'; Holm 78'	Stadium: Skagerak Arena; Attendance: 5,744; Referee: Per Ivar Staberg

27 June 2014	Sarpsborg 08 (1)	3–2	(1) Start	Sarpsborg
19:00 CEST (UTC+2)	Olanare 3' (pen.), 57'; Dja Djédjé 81'	Report	Hoff 56'; Vilhjálmsson 86'	Stadium: Sarpsborg Stadion; Attendance: 1,604; Referee: Espen Berntsen

27 June 2014	Viking (1)	4–1	(1) Sogndal	Stavanger
19:00 CEST (UTC+2)	de Lanlay 25'; Sverrisson 57'; Böðvarsson 77'; Dyngeland 90' (o.g.)	Report	Karadas 72'	Stadium: Viking Stadion; Attendance: 2,300; Referee: Brage Sandmoen

27 June 2014	Aalesund (1)	1–3 (a.e.t.)	(1) Lillestrøm	Ålesund
19:00 CEST (UTC+2)	James 90'	Report	Moen 51'; Østli 119'; Høiland 120'	Stadium: Color Line Stadion; Attendance: 2,589; Referee: Kristoffer Helgerud

27 June 2014	Brann (1)	4–2	(2) Ranheim	Bergen
20:00 CEST (UTC+2)	Askar 14'; Haugen 30'; Barmen 53'; Huseklepp 90'	Report	Reginiussen 39'; Blakstad 88'	Stadium: Brann Stadion; Attendance: 2,656; Referee: Ola Hobber Nilsen

23 July 2014	Bodø/Glimt (1)	0–2	(1) Stabæk	Bodø
19:00 CEST (UTC+2)		Report	Kassi 30'; Adu 83'	Stadium: Aspmyra Stadion; Attendance: 1,699; Referee: Tom Harald Hagen

== Quarter-finals ==
The 8 winners from the Fourth Round took part in this stage of the competition.

Number of teams per tier entering this round
Tippeligaen (1)	1. divisjon (2)	2. divisjon (3)	3. divisjon (4)	4. divisjon (5)	Total
8 / 16	0 / 16	0 / 56	0 / 164	0 / 312	8 / 564

13 August 2014	Stabæk (1)	1–0	(1) Haugesund	Bærum
18:00 CEST (UTC+2)	Hoseth 1'	Report		Stadium: Nadderud Stadion; Attendance: 3,135; Referee: Tore Hansen

13 August 2014	Molde (1)	5–1	(1) Viking	Molde
20:00 CEST (UTC+2)	Chima Chukwu 14'; Elyounoussi 41'; Moström 51'; Flo 58'; Gulbrandsen 69'	Report	de Lanlay 33'	Stadium: Aker Stadion; Attendance: 5,015; Referee: Tommy Skjerven

14 August 2014	Lillestrøm (1)	0–2	(1) Sarpsborg 08	Lillestrøm
18:00 CEST (UTC+2)		Report	Zajić 15'; Wiig 80'	Stadium: Åråsen Stadion; Attendance: 5,278; Referee: Ken Henry Johnsen

14 August 2014	Odd (1)	3–1	(1) Brann	Skien
20:00 CEST (UTC+2)	Shala 66' (pen.), 87'; Kjelsrud Johansen 78'	Report	Huseklepp 24'	Stadium: Skagerak Arena; Attendance: 8,348; Referee: Dag Vidar Hafsås

== Semi-finals ==
The 4 winners from the Quarterfinals took part in this stage of the competition.

Number of teams per tier entering this round
Tippeligaen (1)	1. divisjon (2)	2. divisjon (3)	3. divisjon (4)	4. divisjon (5)	Total
4 / 16	0 / 16	0 / 56	0 / 164	0 / 312	4 / 564

24 September 2014	Stabæk (1)	0–1	(1) Molde	Bærum
20:00 CEST (UTC+2)		Report	Elyounoussi 86'	Stadium: Nadderud Stadion; Attendance: 4,938; Referee: Tom Harald Hagen

25 September 2014	Odd (1)	5–2	(1) Sarpsborg 08	Skien
19:45 CEST (UTC+2)	Shala 48', 71'; Halvorsen 58', 90+3'; Johnsen 66'	Report	Zajić 37'; Þórarinsson 77'	Stadium: Skagerak Arena; Attendance: 12,293; Referee: Svein Oddvar Moen

== Final ==
The 2 winners from the Semifinals take part in this stage of the competition.

23 November 2014
13:15 CET (UTC+1)

Odd	0–2	Molde
	Report	Gulbrandsen 73'; Elyounoussi 89'

Ullevaal Stadion, Oslo
Attendance: 26,582
Referee: Dag Vidar Hafsås (Kolstad)
