= Ørjan Nyland =

Norwegian footballer (born 1990)

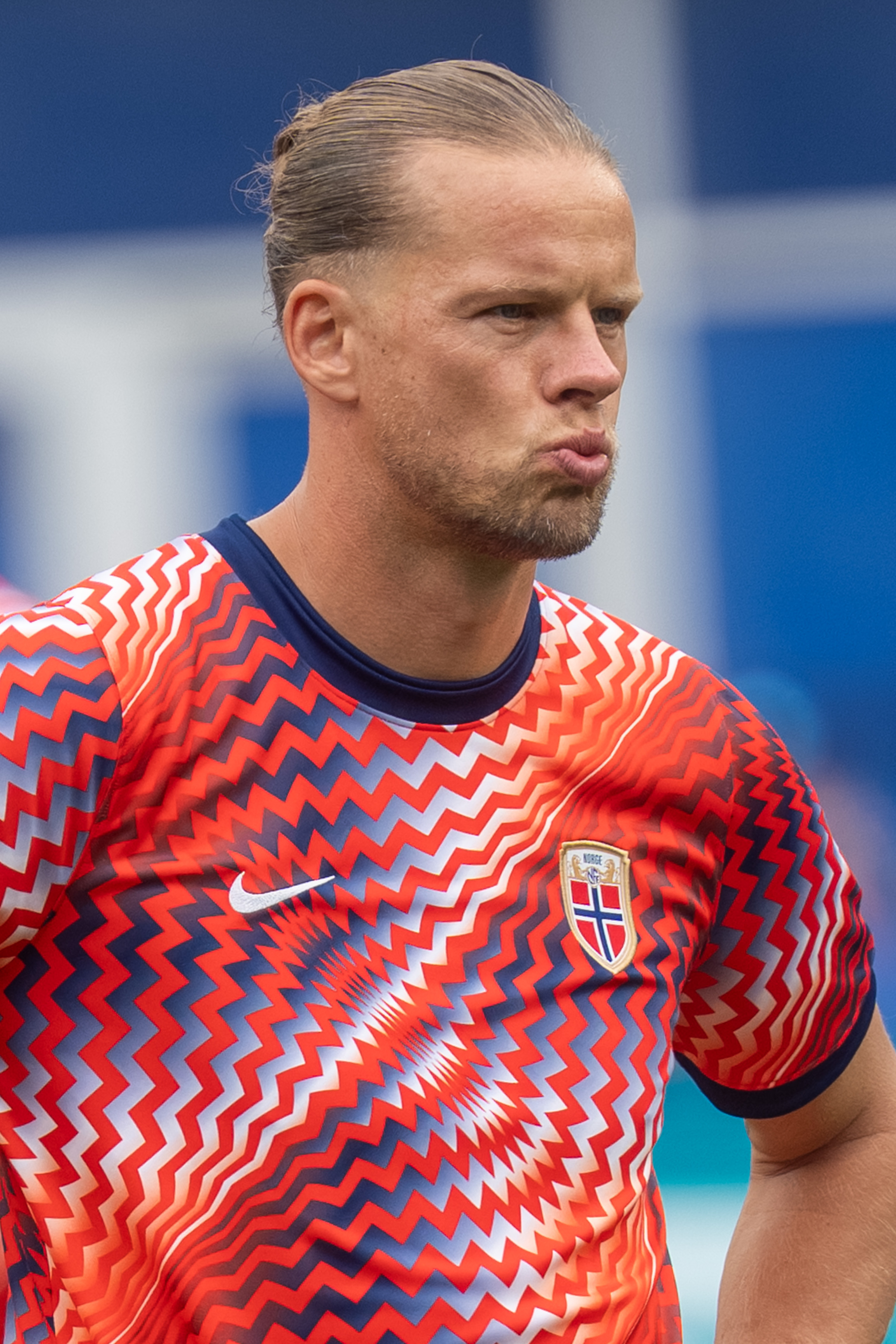
- Nyland with Norway in 2026

Personal information
- Full name: Ørjan Håskjold Nyland
- Date of birth: 10 September 1990 (age 36)
- Place of birth: Volda, Norway
- Height: 1.92 m (6 ft 4 in)
- Position: Goalkeeper

Team information
- Current team: RB Leipzig
- Number: 1

Youth career
- Mork IL
- –2011: Volda TI

Senior career*
Years	Team	Apps	(Gls)
2007–2012	Hødd	59	(0)
2013–2015	Molde	61	(0)
2015–2018	FC Ingolstadt	48	(0)
2018–2020	Aston Villa	30	(0)
2021	Norwich City	0	(0)
2021–2022	AFC Bournemouth	1	(0)
2022	Reading	10	(0)
2022–2023	RB Leipzig	2	(0)
2023–2026	Sevilla	59	(0)
2026–	RB Leipzig	1	(0)

International career^{‡}
2008	Norway U18	2	(0)
2011–2013	Norway U21	8	(0)
2013–	Norway	80	(0)
Medal record
Representing Norway
European Under-21 Championship
Bronze medal – third place	2013 Israel	U-21
- * Club domestic league appearances and goals as of 24 October 2026 ‡ National team caps and goals as of 17 November 2026

Ørjan Håskjold Nyland (born 10 September 1990) is a Norwegian professional footballer who plays as a goalkeeper for Bundesliga club RB Leipzig and the Norway national team.

Nyland previously played for Hødd, and was named the man of the match in the 2012 Norwegian Cup final. He joined the defending Tippeligaen champions Molde ahead of the 2013 season. He signed for Aston Villa in August 2018, and stayed with the club until his contract was terminated in 2020. He then had short stints with Norwich City and Bournemouth, before joining Reading in March 2022. On 14 October 2022, he signed for Bundesliga club RB Leipzig on a nine-month contract deal until June 2023.

Nyland made his debut for Norway in 2013, and has previously represented Norway at youth level. He was the first-choice goalkeeper for the under-21 team at the 2013 UEFA European Under-21 Championship.

== Club career ==
Nyland was born in Volda Municipality and competed in handball, alpine skiing and football when he was young. As a footballer, Nyland played for Mork IL and Volda TI before he joined Hødd in 2007. Nyland did not play in his first year at the club due to the competition from Kim Deinoff and Vebjørn Skeide. Deinoff left Hødd after the 2007-season and for the next two seasons, Nyland was the second choice behind Skeide before becoming the first choice during the 2010 season.

Nyland has been regarded as one of the most talented goalkeepers in Norway, and trained with Rosenborg on two occasions in 2007, the English club Everton in December 2008 and Molde in November 2011. In December 2011, Nyland was one of six young goalkeepers selected for Frode Grodås's project The national goalkeeper of tomorrow 2014 initiated by the Football Association of Norway, where the goal was to develop the next national team goalkeeper.

Ahead of the 2012 season, Tromsø wanted to sign Nyland as a back-up for Marcus Sahlman, but could not afford to pay what Hødd demanded for the goalkeeper, who had one year left of his contract. Nyland stayed at Hødd and was one of Hødd's best players during the 2012 season, winning the Statoil Talent Prize in October, an award given to outstanding young Norwegian footballers each month.

In the 2012 Norwegian Football Cup final, Nyland delivered several match-winning saves and was named man of the match. Nyland also saved Remi Johansen's penalty when Hødd won 4–2 in the penalty shootout against Tromsø and won their first Norwegian Football Cup title.

After the season, Nyland became a free agent. Two Tippeligaen sides, Start and Sogndal, wanted to sign Nyland, and publicly promised Nyland the spot as their first-choice goalkeeper if he signed. Lars Ivar Moldskred, as an advisor for Nyland, advised him to sign for Start, but he instead signed for defending Tippeligaen champions Molde where he competed with Espen Bugge Pettersen and Ole Söderberg.

=== Molde ===
Nyland made his first-team debut for Molde in the 5–0 victory against Elnesvågen og Omegn in the first round of the 2013 Norwegian Football Cup. Nyland also played the second round tie against Byåsen before he made his Tippeligaen debut in a 1–1 draw against Start on 6 May 2013. With Bugge Pettersen out injured, Nyland soon became the club's first choice goalkeeper and played every match in Tippeligaen until the 17th round when manager Ole Gunnar Solskjær rested him. He signed a new contract with Molde in September 2013, binding him to the club to the summer of 2018. Nyland missed a couple of matches in October due to an injury, but was back when Molde met Rosenborg on 26 October 2013. He played a total of 20 matches in Tippeligaen during the 2013 season, where Molde finished 6th.

=== FC Ingolstadt 04 ===
On 1 July 2015, Nyland signed a four-year contract with newly promoted Bundesliga side FC Ingolstadt 04 for an undisclosed fee. Nyland made his Bundesliga debut in a 0–4 home defeat against Borussia Dortmund on 23 August 2015.

=== Aston Villa ===
On 7 August 2018, Steve Bruce's Aston Villa revealed that they had signed Nyland on a three-year contract.

On 18 June 2020, Nyland was involved in a controversy after he appeared to carry the ball across the goal line after saving a free kick from Oliver Norwood and colliding with one of his own defenders. Because of interference with the Hawk-Eye goal line technology, play was allowed to continue and Sheffield United were denied a goal.

In summer 2020, Aston Villa signed Emiliano Martínez from Arsenal. Nyland fell from the first team and was linked with a move to another team. He made one appearance in the 2020–21 season before departing Villa by agreeing a mutual termination of his contract on 5 October 2020.

=== Norwich City ===
On 1 February 2021, Nyland signed for Norwich City for the remainder of the 2020–21 season. On 26 June 2021, he announced his departure from Norwich City.

=== Bournemouth ===
Nyland signed with Championship club Bournemouth on a free transfer on 17 August 2021. A week later, he made his debut for the club in the second round of the EFL Cup against former club Norwich City, conceding six goals in the process as the Cherries fell to a 0–6 defeat. On 31 January 2022, Bournemouth and Nyland agreed to terminate his contract but he remained at the Cherries to train to assist with his injury recovery.

=== Reading ===
On 10 March 2022, Nyland signed for Reading on a short-term contract until the end of the 2021–22 season. On 20 May 2022, Reading confirmed that Nyland would leave the club upon the expiration of his contract.

=== RB Leipzig ===
On 9 October 2022, Nyland joined RB Leipzig until June 2023, as a replacement for injured Péter Gulácsi and Janis Blaswich. In his last match, on 27 May 2023, Nyland assisted Christopher Nkunku in the last minute of added time in a 4–2 victory over Schalke, enabling the latter to win the 2022–23 Bundesliga top scorer, along with Niclas Füllkrug.

=== Sevilla FC ===
On 20 August 2023, Nyland joined Sevilla on a free transfer. He made his debut on 23 September, against Osasuna, keeping a clean sheet in a goalless away draw. On 23 May 2024, he extended his contract with the club by two years. He left the club after his contract expired in June 2026.

=== Return to RB Leipzig ===
On 4 August 2026, Nyland rejoined RB Leipzig, signing a contract until 2028.

== International career ==
Nyland represented Norway from under-16 to under-18 level, but was not selected for youth international teams for two years because he did not play regularly at Hødd. After he became first-choice goalkeeper at Hødd, he was called up for the under-21 team in June 2011 and made his debut for the team in the 1–4 loss against Sweden U21.

Nyland became a regular in Per Joar Hansen's U21-squad in 2012, where he was the second-choice goalkeeper behind Arild Østbø. Nyland played the last play-off match against France U21 when Østbø was unavailable due to an injury. Nyland received praise for his performance in that match, which was his third appearance for the under-21 team, when they qualified for the 2013 UEFA European Under-21 Football Championship after beating France U21 5–3.

As one of three goalkeepers, Nyland was included in the Norwegian squad for the under-21 championship, along with Arild Østbø and Gudmund Taksdal Kongshavn. Ahead of the championship, the head coach Tor Ole Skullerud hadn't decided whether he was using Østbø, who was the preferred choice in the qualification, or any of the two other goalkeepers who had both impressed for their teams in the start of the 2013 Tippeligaen season. Nyland was chosen to play the opening match against the hosts Israel U-21, and played three out of four matches in the championship, with Østbø playing the last group-stage match against Italy U-21. The Norwegian team was defeated by eventual winners Spain U-21 in the semi-final, and won a bronze-medal. Nyland was praised for his performances in the championship, especially in the match against Spain, and he was included in The Guardian's "team of the tournament", at the expense of David de Gea. Nyland was also included in UEFA's "all-star squad" together with his compatriot Stefan Strandberg.

Nyland was first called up for the Norway national team squad for the World Cup qualifiers against Cyprus and Switzerland in September 2013. He made his debut for the national team in the friendly match against Scotland on 20 November 2013, on Molde's home ground Aker Stadion.

On 21 May 2026, Nyland was included in the 26-man squad selected by Norway national team manager Ståle Solbakken for the 2026 FIFA World Cup. He made his World Cup debut in a 4–1 victory over Iraq, becoming the oldest Norwegian player ever to appear at the tournament at 35 years and 279 days. In the Round of 16 against Brazil, he made several crucial saves, including stopping a penalty, and also conceded one, helping Norway secure a 2–1 win to reach their first-ever World Cup quarter-final. In extra time of the quarter-final against England, he spilled a Morgan Rogers strike, allowing Jude Bellingham to score from close range for England's second goal of the match as Norway lost 2–1.

== Career statistics ==
=== Club ===
As of match played 27 October 2026

Appearances and goals by club, season and competition
Club	Season	League			National cup (Note: Includes Norwegian Cup, DFB-Pokal, FA Cup, Copa del Rey)		League cup (Note: Includes EFL Cup)		Europe		Other		Total	
Club	Season	Division	Apps	Goals	Apps	Goals	Apps	Goals	Apps	Goals	Apps	Goals	Apps	Goals
Hødd	2011	1. divisjon	28	0	3	0	—		—		—		31	0
Hødd	2012	1. divisjon	28	0	7	0	—		—		—		35	0
Hødd	Total		56	0	10	0	—		—		—		66	0
Molde	2013	Tippeligaen	20	0	6	0	—		6 (Note: Four appearances in UEFA Champions League, two appearances in UEFA Europa League)	0	—		32	0
Molde	2014	Tippeligaen	28	0	5	0	—		4 (Note: Appearances in UEFA Europa League)	0	—		37	0
Molde	2015	Tippeligaen	13	0	2	0	—		—		—		15	0
Molde	Total		61	0	13	0	—		10	0	—		84	0
FC Ingolstadt	2015–16	Bundesliga	6	0	1	0	—		—		—		7	0
FC Ingolstadt	2016–17	Bundesliga	12	0	1	0	—		—		—		13	0
FC Ingolstadt	2017–18	2. Bundesliga	30	0	3	0	—		—		—		33	0
FC Ingolstadt	Total		48	0	5	0	—		—		—		53	0
Aston Villa	2018–19	Championship	23	0	0	0	0	0	—		—		23	0
Aston Villa	2019–20	Premier League	7	0	1	0	3	0	—		—		11	0
Aston Villa	2020–21	Premier League	0	0	0	0	1	0	—		—		1	0
Aston Villa	Total		30	0	1	0	4	0	—		—		35	0
Norwich City	2020–21	Championship	0	0	0	0	0	0	—		—		0	0
Bournemouth	2021–22	Championship	1	0	1	0	1	0	—		—		3	0
Reading	2021–22	Championship	10	0	0	0	0	0	—		—		10	0
RB Leipzig	2022–23	Bundesliga	2	0	1	0	—		0	0	—		3	0
Sevilla	2023–24	La Liga	24	0	2	0	—		2 (Note: Appearances in UEFA Champions League)	0	—		28	0
Sevilla	2024–25	La Liga	30	0	1	0	—		—		—		31	0
Sevilla	2025–26	La Liga	5	0	2	0	—		—		—		7	0
Sevilla	Total		59	0	5	0	—		2	0	—		66	0
RB Leipzig	2026–27	Bundesliga	1	0	1	0	—		0	0	—		2	0
Career total			248	0	36	0	5	0	10	0	0	0	306	0

=== International ===
As of match played 17 November 2026

Appearances and goals by national team and year
National team	Year	Apps	Goals
Norway	2013	1	0
Norway	2014	9	0
Norway	2015	9	0
Norway	2016	4	0
Norway	2017	2	0
Norway	2018	2	0
Norway	2019	1	0
Norway	2020	0	0
Norway	2021	5	0
Norway	2022	9	0
Norway	2023	8	0
Norway	2024	8	0
Norway	2025	9	0
Norway	2026	13	0
Total		80	0

== Honours ==
Hødd

- Norwegian Cup: 2012

Molde

- Tippeligaen: 2014
- Norwegian Cup: 2013, 2014

Aston Villa

- EFL Cup runner-up: 2019–20

RB Leipzig

- DFB-Pokal: 2022–23

Norway U21

- UEFA European Under-21 Championship bronze: 2013

Individual

- UEFA European Under-21 Championship Team of the Tournament: 2013
- Tippeligaen Goalkeeper of the Year: 2014, 2015
- La Liga Save of the Month: April 2025
