= 2012 Norwegian Football Cup final =

- Event: 2012 Norwegian Football Cup
Hødd	Tromsø
1	1
- Hødd won 4–2 on penalties
- Date: 25 November 2012
- Venue: Ullevaal Stadion, Oslo
- Man of the Match: Ørjan Nyland
- Referee: Kjetil Sælen
- Attendance: 24,217

The 2012 Norwegian Football Cup final was the 107th final of the Norwegian Football Cup. The final was contested by Hødd and Tromsø and took place on 25 November 2012 at Ullevaal Stadion in Oslo, in front of a crowd of 24,217. This was Tromsø's third final, and they had won the two previous finals in 1986 and 1996, while the Norwegian First Division side Hødd played their first final ever.

Hødd, who entered the final as underdogs, won the final after penalties and became the first second-tier side to win the Norwegian Cup in 15 years, since Vålerenga won in 1997. As the winner of the Norwegian Cup, Hødd earned a place in the second qualifying round of the 2013–14 UEFA Europa League.

== Route to the final ==
Hødd		Round	Tromsø	
Tornado Måløy (D3); A 3–0	Klock 4', Heltne 13', Karlsen 30'	First round	Porsanger (D3); A 2–0	Nystrøm 36', 53'
Arna-Bjørnar (D3); A 1–0	Karlsen 55'	Second round	Stjørdals-Blink (D3); A 2–1	Frantzen 45', Drage 68'
Sarpsborg 08 (D1); H 2–1 aet	Standal 66', Helland 117'	Third round	Tromsdalen (D1); H 4–0	Yttergård Jenssen 48', Ondrášek 62', Björck 65', Lysvoll 87'
Asker (D2); H 7–0	Heltne 4', Sandal 20', 37', Helland 53', 61', Standal 56', Mork 63'	Fourth round	Start (D1); A 1–1 (4–1 p)	Johansen 43'
Haugesund (TL); A 2–2 (5–4 p)	Helland 32', 49'	Quarter-final	Bodø/Glimt (D1); H 1–0	Ondrášek 23'
Brann (TL); H 3–1	Aursnes 40', Helland 66', Sellin 81'	Semi-final	Molde (TL); H 2–1	Ondrášek 3', Årst 72'

- (TL) = Tippeligaen team
- (D1) = 1. divisjon team
- (D2) = 2. divisjon team
- (D3) = 3. divisjon team

=== Hødd ===
Hødd faced the Third Division team Tornado Måløy in the first round of the 2012 Norwegian Football Cup, and Hødd became the third team in four years to reach the -final after beating Tornado Maløy in the first round, like Molde did in 2009 and Aalesund in 2011. Fredrik Klock scored Hødd's first goal after a corner kick, before Vegard Heltne scored the second goal a few minutes later. Michael Karlsen's goal after 30 minutes was the last goal in the match, and Hødd won comfortably 3–0. Karlsen also scored in the second round when Hødd won 1–0 against another Third Division side, Arna-Bjørnar. Hødd's head coach Lars Arne Nilsen claimed ahead of the -final that Arna-Bjørnar was the team who was closest on eliminating Hødd from the cup that year.

The First Division side Sarpsborg 08 visited Høddvoll in the third round, and it was the guests that took the lead after 38 minutes when Morten Giæver scored. Espen Standal equalized after 66 minutes and with 1–1 at full-time, the match went into extra time. As the tie approached 120 minutes, Pål André Helland scored Hødd's winning goal. Helland scored twice when Hødd drew 2–2 in the quarter-final against the Tippeligaen side Haugesund. Hødd won the penalty shoot-out 5–4 when Martin Bjørnbak missed Haugesund's sixth penalty after Helland and Haugesund's Alexander Søderlund missed one penalty each while the rest scored.

The supporters of Brann booked plane-tickets and hotel-rooms in Oslo after their team were drawn away against Hødd in the semi-final, as they were confident that Brann would beat the second-tier team and reach a second consecutive cup -final, despite not winning in Møre og Romsdal since Brann won 2–0 against Molde on 6 May 2006. Zsolt Korcsmár sent Brann in the lead after 17 minutes before Fredrik Aursnes equalized five minutes before half time. With goals from Helland and Kjell Rune Sellin in the second half Hødd won 3–1, and qualified for their first ever Norwegian Cup -final.

=== Tromsø ===
Tromsø won 2–0 after two goals from Steffen Nystrøm against the Third Division side Porsanger in the first round. Tromsø met Stjørdals-Blink in the second round, six years after they met in the second round of the 2006 Norwegian Football Cup, and Tromsø won 2–1 after goals from William Frantzen and Thomas Drage. Tromsdalen, who have met only either Tromsø or Bodø/Glimt in the third round since 1993, were beaten 4–0 in the third round after goals from Ruben Yttergård Jenssen, Zdeněk Ondrášek, Fredrik Björck and Vegard Lysvoll.

Remi Johansen sent Tromsø in the lead after 42 minutes in the fourth-round match against second-tier team Start. Rolf Daniel Vikstøl equalized for Start three minutes into injury time, and after none of the team scored in the extra time the match was decided in a penalty shoot-out, which Tromsø won 4–1. Tromsø eliminated rivals FK Bodø/Glimt in the quarter-final after Ondrášek scored the only goal at Aspmyra Stadion. Last years Tippeligaen winners, Molde, the only team who won against Tromsø at Alfheim Stadion last season, were drawn against Tromsø in the semi-final. Ondrášek scored the first goal in the semi-final at Alfheim, and Tromsø were leading 1–0 at half time. Ole Martin Årst scored Tromsø's second goal in the 72nd minute, and when Molde only managed to score once, Daniel Chima seven minutes before full-time, Tromsø were ready for their first Norwegian Cup -final since 1996.

== Pre-match ==
=== Supporters ===
Like in the previous finals, the two clubs received 13,000 of the 25,500 tickets to the final. Of the 13,000 seats, the two club got 3,000 each while the remaining 7,000 are distributed between the clubs based on the average attendance in their home games in the league, which resulted in 7,300 tickets to Tromsø while Hødd received 5,700. The remaining 10,000 tickets went to partners of the Norwegian Football Association.

The Norwegian FA decided to rebuild parts of the stands at Ullevaal, in particular the stands where Tromsø's supporters were situated. Construction started a week and a half before the match and as a result Tromsø's supporters are not going to have a roof during the match. This has caused some distress among the supporters, who fear that the lack of a roof will rob their singing of the proper acoustics during the match.

=== Officials ===
Ten years after Kjetil Sælen made his debut as a referee in Tippeligaen, he was selected to officiate his first Norwegian Cup final. The Arna-Bjørnar based referee had previously been fourth official in the 2006 Norwegian Football Cup and had officiated 115 matches in Tippeligaen at the time of the final. Sælen's assistants for the final was Sven Erik Midthjell from Eid IL and Reidar Gundersen from Frisk Asker. Kristoffer Helgerud was originally assigned as fourth official, but were replaced by Brage Sandmoen the day before the final.

== Match ==
=== Background ===
Tromsø, who won the Norwegian Cup in 1986 and 1996, went into their third final as favourites; the team finished fourth in Tippeligaen while Hødd, who appeared in their first final, avoided relegation to the Second Division in the last match with better goal difference than Tromsdalen. The two teams had met each other on four previous occasions, when Tromsø were playing in the First Division in 2002 they won both matches against Hødd 3–0. Tromsø also won both matches when Hødd were playing in Tippeligaen in 1995.

=== Report ===
Saliou Ciss was preferred ahead of Tromsø's captain Miika Koppinen as the left centre back, and with Koppinen on the bench Ruben Yttergård Jensen was captaining Tromsø, who played in a 4-4-2 formation. Aursnes, who scored against Brann in the semifinal, was ill ahead of the final but recovered in time to start in Hødd's 4-2-3-1 formation alongside Sivert Heltne Nilsen in the midfield.

Hødd's Vegard Heltne fouled Hans Norbye after only 14 seconds and received the fastest ever yellow card in a Norwegian Cup final. One minute later, Ondrášek had a big opportunity to send Tromsø in the lead, but his shot hit above the crossbar. Tromsø controlled possession in the start of the first half, and Thomas Drage had a shot from the corner of the penalty area in the 17th minute, but his shot ended half a meter wide off the post. Hødd had two great chances at the end of the first half, but both the shots from Sandal and Helland went wide off the post.

Hødd settled into their own rhythm after half time, and took the lead after 62 minutes when Sandal sent a defence-splitting pass to Sellin who converted the ball behind Benny Lekström. Minutes later, Sandal unleashed a 30-yard strike which went only inches over the bar. Tromsø almost drew level when veteran striker Ole Martin Årst, but Hødd's goalkeeper Ørjan Nyland saved it with his face. Nyland then repeated his heroics five minutes later, this time denying Ondrášek with a one-hand save from point-blank range. Three minutes from full-time, Ciss finally ended Hødd's resolve when he scored from Remi Johansen's centre.

In the extra time, the pressure from Tromsø was almost continuous. However, it was Hødd who got the first big chance after 102 minutes when Andreas Rekdal was along with the goalkeeper, but instead of shooting Rekdal sent a pass to Helland who shot over the open goal from 20 meter. During the last three minutes of the extra time Nyland, who was voted as the man of the match by the official jury, had two magnificent saves on shots from Remi Johansen and Ruben Kristiansen.

After Akem Latifu, Årst, Nilsen, Drage and Helland converted their penalties, Ørjan Nyland saved the penalty from Remi Johansen with Hødd leading 3–2. Tromsø's goalkeeper Lekström then followed up by saving Sandal's penalties before Ciss sent his attempt wide. Andreas Rekdal scored on the next penalty, which meant that Hødd won the penalty shoot-out, and secured their first Norwegian Cup ever.

=== Details ===
25 November 2012
13:15 CET (UTC+1)

Hødd	1–1 (a.e.t.)	Tromsø
Sellin 62'	Report	Ciss 87'
Penalties
Latifu (penalty scored); Nilsen (penalty scored); Helland (penalty scored); Sandal (penalty missed); Rekdal (penalty scored)	4–2	(penalty scored) Årst; (penalty scored) Drage; (penalty missed) Johansen; (penalty missed) Ciss

Ullevaal Stadion, Oslo
Attendance: 24,217
Referee: Kjetil Sælen (Arna-Bjørnar)

Hødd	Tromsø

GK	1	(Norway) Ørjan Nyland
RB	24	(Nigeria) Akeem Latifu
CB	5	(Norway) Fredrik Klock (c)
CB	2	(Norway) Steffen Moltu
LB	3	(Norway) Victor Grodås
RM	22	(Norway) Fredrik Aursnes		(substituted off) 120'
CM	7	(Norway) Erik Sandal
LM	16	(Norway) Sivert Heltne Nilsen
RW	19	(Norway) Vegard Heltne	(yellow card) 1'	(substituted off) 85'
CF	23	(Norway) Kjell Rune Sellin		(substituted off) 96'
LW	8	(Norway) Pål André Helland
Substitutes:
GK	25	(Norway) Jan Lennart Urke
FW	9	(Norway) Espen Standal		(substituted on) 96'
DF	13	(Norway) Ruben Kenneth Brandal
MF	15	(Norway) Bendik Torset		(substituted on) 120'
DF	17	(Norway) Ørjan Engen Grimstad
MF	18	(Norway) Andreas Rekdal		(substituted on) 85'
MF	21	(Norway) Eirik Heltne
Head Coach:
(Norway) Lars Arne Nilsen

GK	27	(Sweden) Benny Lekström
RB	14	(Norway) Hans Norbye
CB	3	(Sweden) Fredrik Björck
CB	22	(Senegal) Saliou Ciss	(yellow card) 43'
LB	4	(Norway) Ruben Kristiansen
RM	18	(Norway) Thomas Kind Bendiksen		(substituted off) 81'
CM	2	(Senegal) Kara Mbodj		(substituted off) 67'
CM	11	(Norway) Ruben Yttergård Jenssen (c)
RM	10	(Norway) Thomas Drage
CF	28	(Switzerland) Aleksandar Prijović		(substituted off) 54'
CF	13	(Czech Republic) Zdeněk Ondrášek
Substitutes:
GK	35	(Finland) Henri Sillanpää
DF	7	(Finland) Miika Koppinen
FW	9	(Norway) Steffen Nystrøm
MF	15	(Norway) Magnus Andersen		(substituted on) 81'
DF	16	(Norway) Hans Åge Yndestad
MF	17	(Norway) Remi Johansen		(substituted on) 67'
FW	25	(Norway) Ole Martin Årst		(substituted on) 54'
Head Coach:
(Norway) Per-Mathias Høgmo

MATCH OFFICIALS

- Assistant referees:
  - Svein Erik Midthjell (Eid IL)
  - Reidar Gundersen (IF Frisk-Asker)
- Fourth official: Kristoffer Helgerud (Lier IL)

MATCH RULES

- 90 minutes.
- 30 minutes of extra-time if necessary.
- Penalty shoot-out if scores still level.
- Seven named substitutes.
- Maximum of three substitutions.

== See also ==
- 2012 Norwegian Football Cup
- 2012 Tippeligaen
- 2012 1. divisjon
- 2012 in Norwegian football
