= Fredrik Klock =

Norwegian footballer (born 1981)

Personal information
- Full name: Fredrik Linge Klock
- Date of birth: 3 September 1981 (age 45)
- Place of birth: Ålesund, Norway
- Height: 1.91 m (6 ft 3 in)
- Position: Central defender

Youth career
- Hessa IL

Senior career*
Years	Team	Apps	(Gls)
2001–2004	Aalesund	26	(1)
2002	→ FF Lillehammer (loan)		
2004–2005	Brann	3	(0)
2006–2012	Hødd		
- * Club domestic league appearances and goals

Fredrik Klock (born 3 September 1981) is a retired Norwegian footballer.

He earlier played with Brann in the Norwegian Premier League. He debuted in a Royal League game against Halmstad BK on 24 February 2005. He signed a three-year-long contract with IL Hødd 8 February 2006.

== Honours ==
=== Club ===
Hødd

- Norwegian Football Cup (1): 2012
