= Nordkisa =

Coordinates: 60°11′N 11°16′E

- Village
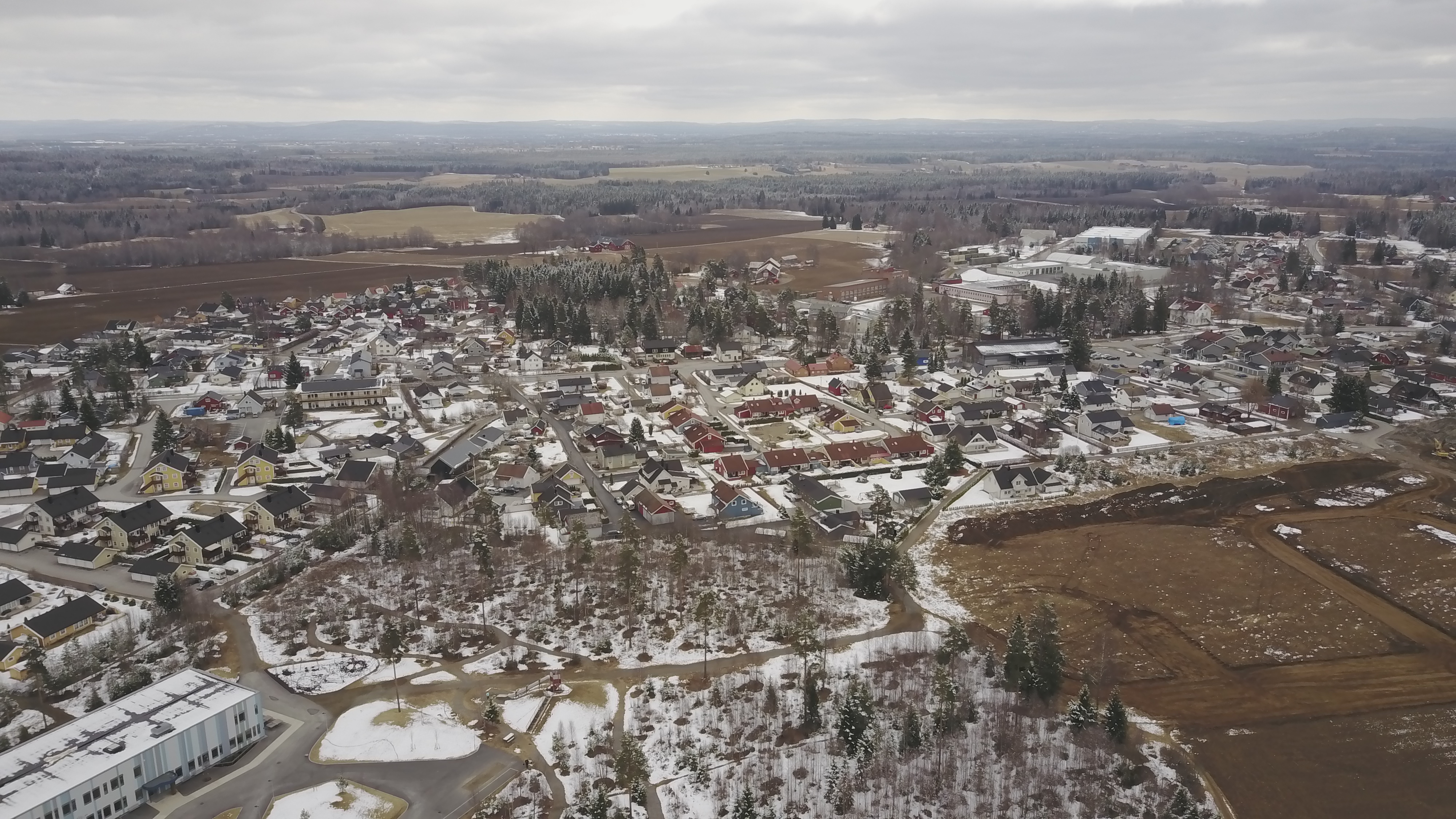

- Location in Akershus
- Country: Norway
- Region: Østlandet
- County: Akershus
- Municipality: Ullensaker
- Time zone: UTC+01:00 (CET)
  - Summer (DST): UTC+02:00 (CEST)

Nordkisa is a village in the municipality of Ullensaker, Norway. Its population (2024) is 1347.
