= Henrik Gustavsen =

Norwegian footballer (born 1992)

Personal information
- Date of birth: 8 April 1992 (age 34)
- Place of birth: Tønsberg, Norway
- Height: 1.80 m (5 ft 11 in)
- Position: Central midfielder

Youth career
- Halsen
- 2009–2010: Sandefjord

Senior career*
Years	Team	Apps	(Gls)
2010–2013	Sandefjord	68	(2)
2014–2021	Notodden	180	(12)

International career
2010	Norway U18	1	(0)

Managerial career
- 2022–: Sandefjord (youth)
- * Club domestic league appearances and goals as of 14 December 2021

Henrik Gustavsen (born 8 April 1992) is a Norwegian footballer who played most of his career for Notodden, as a midfielder.

== Career ==
Gustavsen joined Sandefjord Fotball in 2009, from Halsen IF. He later signed his professional contract with the club, and made his debut for Sandefjord in the Tippeligaen on 21 March 2010, in a 3-1 home victory against Molde FK, replacing Panajotis Dimitriadis in the dying minutes of the match. Gustavsen played in 15 matches for Sandefjord, with his club being relegated.

Moving on to Notodden FK, he played 198 matches across all competitions and served as captain in their 2021 2. divisjon season, before leaving the club in late 2021. He was subsequently hired as head coach of Sandefjord U16.
