= Ludvig Rinde =

Norwegian footballer (born 1991)

Personal information
- Full name: Ludvig Balteskard Rinde
- Date of birth: 24 March 1991 (age 35)
- Place of birth: Tromsø, Norway
- Height: 1.84 m (6 ft 1/2 in)
- Position: Defender

Youth career
- Tromsø

Senior career*
Years	Team	Apps	(Gls)
2010–2011	Tromsø	4	(0)
2012–2014	Tromsdalen	78	(2)
- * Club domestic league appearances and goals as of 2 November 2014

Ludvig Rinde (born 24 March 1991) is a retired Norwegian football defender. He played for Tromsø before he joined Tromsdalen ahead of the 2012 season.

== Club career ==
Rinde was born in Tromsø. He made his debut for Tromsø 10 April 2011 against Start, they won the game 2–0. Debut for Tromsdalen came on 9 April 2012 against Ranheim, they lost the game 1–3.

== Career statistics ==
As of 2 November 2014

Season	Club	Division	League		Cup		Total	
Season	Club	Division	Apps	Goals	Apps	Goals	Apps	Goals
2011	Tromsø	Tippeligaen	4	0	0	0	4	0
2012	Tromsdalen	Adeccoligaen	29	2	2	0	31	2
2013	Tromsdalen	2. divisjon	26	0	1	0	27	0
2014	Tromsdalen	1. divisjon	23	0	3	0	26	0
Career Total			82	2	6	0	88	2
