= Tommy Edvardsen =

Norwegian footballer (born 1984)

Personal information
- Full name: Tommy Bjerk-Edvardsen
- Date of birth: 26 December 1984 (age 41)
- Height: 1.79 m (5 ft 10 1/2 in)
- Position: Defender

Youth career
- Vålerenga

Senior career*
| Years | Team | Apps | (Gls) |
| 2003–2005 | Vålerenga | 15 | (1) |
| 2004 | → Haugesund (loan) | 14 | (0) |
| 2005 | → Moss (loan) | 24 | (2) |
| 2006–2010 | Moss | 88 | (4) |
| 2011–2014 | Kristiansund | 55 | (9) |
| 2014–2015 | Kongsvinger | 29 | (1) |
- * Club domestic league appearances and goals

Tommy Edvardsen (born 26 December 1984) is a Norwegian footballer who played as a defender.

He started his youth and senior career at Vålerenga. He got fourteen Eliteserien games in 2003, scoring once. He also played in the UEFA Cup. In 2004, he only got one game, as he was loaned out to FK Haugesund for most of the season. He left Haugesund after the 2004 season, but soon found his way to Moss FK on loan. The loan was made permanent after the season.

After six seasons with Moss, Edvardsen stated that he wanted to leave the club. He was, however, also playing for Moss in 2010, and joined Kristiansund ahead of the 2011 season, where he was a part of the team that won promotion to the First Division in 2012.
