= Samir Fazlagić =

Norwegian footballer (born 1982)

Personal information
- Date of birth: 21 October 1982 (age 44)
- Place of birth: Čapljina, SFR Yugoslavia
- Height: 1.86 m (6 ft 1 in)
- Position: Defender

Youth career
- Stabæk

Senior career*
Years	Team	Apps	(Gls)
2002–2005	Stabæk	23	(3)
2004	→ Skeid (loan)	11	(1)
2005–2009	Strømsgodset	86	(6)
2010–2011	Nybergsund IL-Trysil	27	(1)
2011–2013	Kongsvinger	48	(3)

International career
2003	Norway U-21	3	(1)
- * Club domestic league appearances and goals as of 5 September 2012

Samir Fazlagić (born 21 October 1982) is a former professional football player who last played for Kongsvinger. He first played in Stabæk.

Fazlagić has played three games for Norway's national under-21 football team.
