= Ørjan Berg Hansen =

Norwegian footballer (born 1984)

Personal information
- Date of birth: 29 April 1984 (age 42)
- Position: Defender

Team information
- Current team: Fram Larvik
- Number: 5

Youth career
- Larvik Turn

Senior career*
| Years | Team | Apps | (Gls) |
| 2003–2005 | Sandefjord | | |
| 2006 | → Kongsvinger (loan) | 23 | (1) |
| 2007–2011 | Kongsvinger | 84 | (4) |
| 2012 | HamKam | 27 | (2) |
| 2016 | Fram Larvik | 1 | (0) |
| 2018– | Fram Larvik | 1 | (0) |

Managerial career
- 2016–: Fram Larvik (director of sports)
- * Club domestic league appearances and goals as of 7 July 2018

Ørjan Berg Hansen (born 29 April 1984) is a Norwegian football defender who is currently the director of sports of Fram Larvik.

Hailing from Larvik, he started his career in Larvik Turn, only to go on to second-tier team Sandefjord. In 2006 he was loaned out to Kongsvinger, a loan that was made permanent after the season. The highlight was contesting the 2010 Tippeligaen. One season for HamKam in 2012 was followed by retirement due to inflammations in the knee region. He was later hired as director of sports in third-tier team Fram Larvik, playing the occasional match when the team found themselves in dire need of match-fit players.
