= Kurland, Norway =

Kurland
- Village
- Location in Akershus
- Coordinates: 59°55′57″N 11°01′13″E
- Country: Norway
- Region: Østlandet
- County: Akershus
- Time zone: UTC+01:00 (CET)
  - Summer (DST): UTC+02:00 (CEST)

Kurland is a village in Lørenskog, Akershus, Norway.
