= Alexander Zaim =

Swedish footballer

Personal information
- Date of birth: April 21, 1988 (age 38)
- Place of birth: Helsingborg, Sweden
- Height: 1.83 m (6 ft 0 in)
- Position: Midfielder

Youth career
- Helsingborgs IF

Senior career*
Years	Team	Apps	(Gls)
2006	Helsingborgs IF	1	(0)
2007–2008	Åtvidabergs FF	41	(0)
2009–2012	Landskrona BoIS	64	(4)
2013–2014	Nybergsund IL-Trysil		
2015	Eskilsminne IF	15	(0)
2016	Landskrona BoIS	7	(0)
- * Club domestic league appearances and goals as of 19 November 2016

Alexander Zaim (born April 21, 1988) is a Swedish football player. He has previously played for Helsingborgs IF, Åtvidabergs FF, Landskrona BoIS, Nybergsund IL-Trysil and Eskilsminne IF.
