= Tarjei Dale =

Norwegian footballer (born 1983)

Personal information
- Date of birth: 4 January 1983 (age 43)
- Place of birth: Skien, Norway
- Height: 1.80 m (5 ft 11 in)
- Positions: Midfielder; forward

Team information
- Current team: Notodden
- Number: 16

Youth career
- Gjerpen IF
- Odd Grenland

Senior career*
Years	Team	Apps	(Gls)
2002–2008	Odd Grenland	68	(8)
2005	→Pors Grenland (loan)	16	(1)
2008–2009	Sogndal	38	(14)
2010–2012	Notodden	15	(1)
2013-2019	Skiens Grane	20	(20)

International career^{‡}
	Norway U19	3	(0)
	Norway U20	2	(0)
	Norway U20	6	(0)
- * Club domestic league appearances and goals as of 5 July 2009 ‡ National team caps and goals as of 24 May 2009

Tarjei Dale (born 4 January 1983) is a retired Norwegian professional football player.

== Club career ==
Dale came to Odd Grenland as a junior player from Gjerpen IF in 2000. He got called up to their main squad in 2002 after playing several games for their reserve team. Tarjei played his first match for Odd Grenland when he played 1 minute against Moss FK in July 2002, that was his only match for the season.

In 2006 Odd Grenland played relegation play-off against Bryne FK. In the first match, where Odd Grenland won 3–0 at home, Tarjei scored two goals. In the second match, where Odd Grenland won 7–1 away, Tarje scored 3 goals.

In August 2008, Tarjei signed a two-year contract with Sogndal Fotball, he came to Sogndal from Odd Grenland on a free transfer. He played the fall season for Sogndal and played 11 matches and scored 5 goals.

Dale joined Notodden ahead of the 2010-season.
