= Albert Berbatovci =

Norwegian footballer (born 1989)

Personal information
- Date of birth: 17 February 1989 (age 37)
- Place of birth: SFR Yugoslavia
- Position: Midfielder

Team information
- Current team: Byåsen
- Number: 7

Senior career*
Years	Team	Apps	(Gls)
2007–2011	Rosenborg	1	(0)
2009	→ Stavanger (loan)	10	(0)
2010	→ Ranheim (loan)	3	(0)
2011	→ Tiller (loan)	12	(1)
2012–2017	Nardo	120	(27)
2018–	Byåsen		

International career
	Norway U18	3	(0)
	Norway U19	2	(0)
- * Club domestic league appearances and goals as of 27 March 2011

Albert Berbatovci (born 17 February 1989) is a Norwegian professional footballer who plays for Byåsen.

Born in SFR Yugoslavia, Berbatovci is of Kosovar Albanian heritage. He began his career in 2007 with Rosenborg, and has spent loan spells at Stavanger, Ranheim and Tiller. In 2012, he joined Nardo. In 2018 he went on to then-fourth-tier Byåsen.
