= Michael Karlsen =

Norwegian footballer (born 1990)

Personal information
- Date of birth: 3 February 1990 (age 36)
- Place of birth: Trondheim, Norway
- Height: 1.95 m (6 ft 5 in)
- Position: Striker

Senior career*
Years	Team	Apps	(Gls)
2009–2010	Rosenborg	3	(0)
2010	→ Ranheim (loan)	6	(3)
2010–2012	Hødd	43	(17)
2012–2013	Ranheim	26	(4)
2014	Rødde	23	(11)
2015–2016	Hødd	34	(2)
2016	Brattvåg	10	(4)
2017–2022	Ranheim	129	(33)

International career
2009	Norway U19	1	(0)
- * Club domestic league appearances and goals as of 7 July 2022

Michael Karlsen (born 3 February 1990) is a Norwegian former footballer who played as a striker. Karlsen, hailing from Trondheim, played for both Rosenborg and Ranheim, in addition to Hødd in the higher Norwegian divisions.

== Career statistics ==
=== Club ===
As of match played 4 July 2022

Appearances and goals by club, season and competition
Club	Season	League			National Cup		Europe		Total	
Club	Season	Division	Apps	Goals	Apps	Goals	Apps	Goals	Apps	Goals
Rosenborg	2009	Tippeligaen	3	0	0	0	-		3	0
Rosenborg	Total		3	0	0	0	-	-	3	0
Ranheim (loan)	2010	Adeccoligaen	6	3	2	0	-		8	3
Ranheim (loan)	Total		6	3	2	0	-	-	8	3
Hødd	2011	Adeccoligaen	28	16	3	1	-		31	17
Hødd	2012	Adeccoligaen	15	1	4	2	-		19	3
Hødd	Total		43	17	7	3	-	-	50	20
Ranheim	2012	Adeccoligaen	10	3	0	0	-		10	3
Ranheim	2013	Adeccoligaen	16	1	1	0	-		17	1
Ranheim	Total		26	4	1	0	-	-	27	4
Tillerbyen	2014	Oddsen-ligaen	23	11	1	0	-		24	11
Tillerbyen	Total		23	11	1	0	-	-	24	11
Hødd	2015	OBOS-ligaen	29	2	2	0	-		31	2
Hødd	2016	OBOS-ligaen	5	0	2	2	-		7	2
Hødd	Total		34	2	4	2	-	-	38	4
Brattvåg	2016	PostNord-ligaen	10	4	0	0	-		10	4
Brattvåg	Total		10	4	0	0	-	-	10	4
Ranheim	2017	OBOS-ligaen	26	9	3	1	-		29	10
Ranheim	2018	Eliteserien	22	8	3	3	-		25	11
Ranheim	2019	Eliteserien	26	7	3	1	-		29	8
Ranheim	2020	OBOS-ligaen	27	7	0	0	-		27	7
Ranheim	2021	OBOS-ligaen	21	2	2	0	-		23	2
Ranheim	2022	OBOS-ligaen	7	0	1	0	-		8	0
Ranheim	Total		129	33	12	5	-	-	141	37
Career total			274	74	27	10	-	-	301	83
