= Jo Sondre Aas =

Norwegian footballer (born 1989)

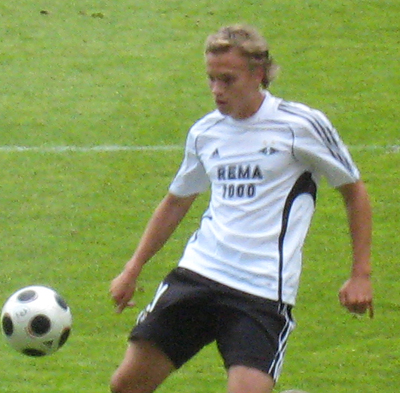

Personal information
- Full name: Jo Sondre Aas
- Date of birth: 2 July 1989 (age 37)
- Place of birth: Grindal, Rennebu Municipality, Norway
- Position: Forward

Team information
- Current team: Levanger
- Number: 10

Youth career
- –2005: Rennebu
- 2006–2007: Rosenborg

Senior career*
Years	Team	Apps	(Gls)
2007–2011	Rosenborg	14	(0)
2009	→ Moss (loan)	19	(4)
2009–2011	→ Ranheim (loan)	26	(5)
2011	Ranheim	30	(16)
2012	Sandefjord	30	(10)
2013–2015	Ranheim	78	(28)
2015–2018	Levanger	86	(20)
2019	Nest-Sotra	23	(5)
2020–2025	Levanger	141	(26)

Managerial career
- 2020–2025: Levanger (assistant)
- 2025–: Levanger
- * Club domestic league appearances and goals as of 11 November 2025

Jo Sondre Aas (born 2 July 1989) is a former Norwegian football player currently the head coach for Levanger.

== Career ==
After impressing performances for Rosenborg's youth-team in a tournament in Spain, Real Madrid invited Aas for a trial where he impressed, netting a hat-trick for Real's C team. However, he declined a contract and chose to stay in Norway. He started the 2009 season on loan from Rosenborg to Moss FK, but the contract was terminated after 19 matches, and Aas went on loan to Ranheim for the rest of the 2009 season. He was on loan to Ranheim until he permanently changed to Ranheim before the season 2011. He signed a three-year contract with Sandefjord on 11 January 2012 but after only one season with Sandefjord he returned to Ranheim because of personal reasons.

On 13 December 2018, Aas signed with Nest-Sotra.

== Career statistics ==
As of 11 November 2025

Club	Season	Division	League		Cup		Total	
Club	Season	Division	Apps	Goals	Apps	Goals	Apps	Goals
2007	Rosenborg	Tippeligaen	3	0	1	0	4	0
2008	Rosenborg	Tippeligaen	11	0	2	0	13	0
2009	Moss	Adeccoligaen	19	4	0	0	19	4
2010	Ranheim	Adeccoligaen	26	5	5	1	31	6
2011	Ranheim	Adeccoligaen	30	16	2	2	32	18
2012	Sandefjord	Adeccoligaen	30	10	5	4	35	14
2013	Ranheim	Adeccoligaen	29	18	4	5	33	23
2014	Ranheim	1. divisjon	29	7	4	6	33	13
2015	Ranheim	OBOS-ligaen	20	3	2	5	22	8
2016	Levanger	OBOS-ligaen	29	9	2	1	31	10
2017	Levanger	OBOS-ligaen	27	4	3	2	30	6
2018	Levanger	OBOS-ligaen	30	7	1	0	31	7
2019	Nest-Sotra	OBOS-ligaen	23	5	1	0	24	5
2020	Levanger	PostNord-ligaen	11	0	0	0	11	0
2021	Levanger	PostNord-ligaen	26	6	2	1	28	7
2022	Levanger	PostNord-ligaen	26	4	1	0	27	4
2023	Levanger	PostNord-ligaen	26	12	1	0	27	12
2024	Levanger	OBOS-ligaen	30	3	3	0	33	3
2025	Levanger	PostNord-ligaen	22	1	4	2	26	3
Career Total			447	114	43	29	490	143

== Honours ==
Individual

- Adeccoligaen top scorer: 2013
