= Kjell Rune Sellin =

Norwegian footballer (born 1989)

Personal information
- Date of birth: 1 June 1989 (age 37)
- Place of birth: Namsos, Norway
- Height: 1.79 m (5 ft 10 in)
- Positions: Striker; winger

Youth career
- Ørland BK

Senior career*
Years	Team	Apps	(Gls)
2007–2008	Byåsen	34	(24)
2008–2010	Rosenborg	18	(2)
2010	→ Kongsvinger (loan)	10	(1)
2011–2012	Aalesund	30	(3)
2012	→ Hødd (loan)	13	(3)
2013–2016	Sandefjord	110	(41)
2017	Sandnes Ulf	29	(11)
2018–2019	Fredrikstad	35	(13)
2019–2020	Strømmen	30	(8)
- * Club domestic league appearances and goals as of 24 October 2020

Kjell Rune Sellin (born 1 June 1989) is a former Norwegian footballer.

He came to Rosenborg BK from Norwegian Second Division team Byåsen IL in August 2008. He made his debut for Rosenborg as a substitute in the 4-0 loss against Tromsø IL the same month as he arrived to the club.

1 January 2017 he signed for Sandnes Ulf.

One year later he signed for Fredrikstad.

In 2019 Sellin signed for Strømmen.

On 17 February 2021 Sellin decide to retire from professional football.

== Career statistics ==
=== Club ===
As of match played 24 October 2020

Appearances and goals by club, season and competition
Club	Season	League			National Cup		Continental		Total	
Club	Season	Division	Apps	Goals	Apps	Goals	Apps	Goals	Apps	Goals
Rosenborg	2008	Tippeligaen	3	0	0	0	-		3	0
Rosenborg	2009	Tippeligaen	8	0	4	5	2	0	14	5
Rosenborg	2010	Tippeligaen	7	2	1	0	-		8	2
Rosenborg	Total		18	2	5	5	2	0	25	7
Kongsvinger (loan)	2010	Tippeligaen	10	1	0	0	-		10	1
Kongsvinger (loan)	Total		10	1	0	0	-	-	10	1
Aalesund	2011	Tippeligaen	22	3	5	2	5	1	32	6
Aalesund	2012	Tippeligaen	8	0	1	1	2	0	11	1
Aalesund	Total		30	3	6	3	7	1	43	7
Hødd (loan)	2012	1. divisjon	13	3	2	2	-		15	5
Hødd (loan)	Total		13	3	2	2	-	-	15	5
Sandefjord	2013	1. divisjon	28	8	3	1	-		31	9
Sandefjord	2014	1. divisjon	29	15	2	4	-		31	19
Sandefjord	2015	Tippeligaen	23	4	2	1	-		25	5
Sandefjord	2016	1. divisjon	30	14	5	3	-		35	17
Sandefjord	Total		110	41	12	9	-	-	122	50
Sandnes Ulf	2017	1. divisjon	29	11	2	0	-		31	11
Sandnes Ulf	Total		29	11	2	0	-	-	31	11
Fredrikstad	2018	2. divisjon	22	8	2	0	-		24	8
Fredrikstad	2019	2. divisjon	13	5	1	0	-		14	5
Fredrikstad	Total		35	13	3	0	-	-	38	13
Strømmen	2019	1. divisjon	15	2	0	0	-		15	2
Strømmen	2020	1. divisjon	15	6	-		-		15	6
Strømmen	Total		30	8	0	0	-	-	30	8
Career total			275	77	30	19	9	1	314	97

== Honours ==
=== Club ===
Rosenborg

- Norwegian Premier League Championship (2): 2009, 2010

Aalesund

- Norwegian Football Cup (1): 2011

Hødd

- Norwegian Football Cup (1): 2012
