= 2015 Viking FK season =

Viking
2015 season
- President: Charlie Granfelt
- Manager: Kjell Jonevret
- Stadium: Viking Stadion
- Tippeligaen: 5th
- Norwegian Cup: Semi-final
- Top goalscorer: League: Veton Berisha (11); All: Jón Daði Böðvarsson (15)
Home colours	Away colours

The 2015 season was Viking's third full season with Kjell Jonevret as manager. They are competing in the Tippeligaen and the cup.

== Squad ==
As of 10 August 2015

Note: Flags indicate national team as defined under FIFA eligibility rules; some limited exceptions apply. Players may hold more than one non-FIFA nationality.

No.	Pos.	Nation	Player
1	GK	NOR	Arild Østbø
4	MF	NOR	Joackim Jørgensen
5	DF	USA	A. J. Soares
6	DF	EST	Karol Mets
7	MF	ISL	Björn Daniel Sverrisson
8	MF	NOR	Vidar Nisja
10	FW	ENG	Kieffer Moore
11	MF	SEN	Makhtar Thioune
14	DF	NOR	André Danielsen (Vice-captain)
15	GK	NOR	Amund Wichne
17	FW	ISL	Jón Daði Böðvarsson

No.	Pos.	Nation	Player
19	FW	NGR	Suleiman Abdullahi
20	DF	ISL	Indriði Sigurðsson (Captain)
21	MF	NOR	Julian Veen Uldal
23	FW	ISL	Steinþór Freyr Þorsteinsson
24	DF	NOR	Aleksander Solli
25	DF	NOR	Rasmus Martinsen
26	FW	NGR	Samuel Adegbenro
27	MF	NOR	Zymer Bytyqi
28	MF	NOR	Kristoffer Haugen
30	GK	NOR	Iven Austbø

=== Out on loan ===
Note: Flags indicate national team as defined under FIFA eligibility rules; some limited exceptions apply. Players may hold more than one non-FIFA nationality.

No.	Pos.	Nation	Player
24	GK	NOR	Pål Vestly Heigre (at Tromsø)

== Transfers ==
=== Winter ===
In: Note: Flags indicate national team as defined under FIFA eligibility rules; some limited exceptions apply. Players may hold more than one non-FIFA nationality.

No.	Pos.	Nation	Player
5	DF	USA	A. J. Soares (from (United States) New England Revolution)
6	DF	EST	Karol Mets (from (Estonia) Flora)
9	MF	NOR	Magne Hoseth (from (Norway) Stabæk)
19	FW	NGR	Suleiman Abdullahi (from (Nigeria) El-Kanemi Warriors)
24	GK	NOR	Pål Vestly Heigre (loan return from (Norway) Start)
26	FW	NGR	Samuel Adegbenro (from (Nigeria) Kwara United)
27	FW	NOR	Zymer Bytyqi (from (Austria) RB Salzburg)

Out: Note: Flags indicate national team as defined under FIFA eligibility rules; some limited exceptions apply. Players may hold more than one non-FIFA nationality.

No.	Pos.	Nation	Player
2	DF	NOR	Trond Erik Bertelsen (to (Norway) Sandnes Ulf)
5	DF	ISL	Sverrir Ingi Ingason (to (Belgium) Lokeren)
6	DF	NOR	Håkon Skogseid (to (Denmark) Odense)
13	MF	NOR	Christian Landu Landu (to (Norway) Tromsø)
24	GK	NOR	Pål Vestly Heigre (on loan to (Norway) Tromsø)
26	DF	NOR	Pål Fjelde (to (Norway) Bryne)
—	DF	NOR	Øyvind Nilsen (to (Norway) Nest-Sotra)

=== Summer ===
In: Note: Flags indicate national team as defined under FIFA eligibility rules; some limited exceptions apply. Players may hold more than one non-FIFA nationality.

No.	Pos.	Nation	Player
10	FW	ENG	Kieffer Moore (from (England) Yeovil Town)
24	DF	NOR	Aleksander Solli (from (Norway) Hønefoss)

Out: Note: Flags indicate national team as defined under FIFA eligibility rules; some limited exceptions apply. Players may hold more than one non-FIFA nationality.

No.	Pos.	Nation	Player
9	MF	NOR	Magne Hoseth (released)
10	FW	NOR	Veton Berisha (to (Germany) Greuther Fürth)
16	FW	NOR	Yann-Erik de Lanlay (to (Norway) Rosenborg)
18	FW	NGR	Osita Henry Chikere (released)
22	MF	NOR	Fábian Alonso Calderon (to (Norway) Sola)
—	FW	NOR	Martin Hummervoll (on loan to (Iceland) Keflavík)

== Competitions ==
=== Tippeligaen ===
==== Table ====
Pos	Team	Pld	W	D	L	GF	GA	GD	Pts	Qualification or relegation
3	Stabæk	30	17	5	8	54	43	+11	56	Qualification for the Europa League first qualifying round
4	Odd	30	15	10	5	61	41	+20	55	Qualification for the Europa League first qualifying round
5	Viking	30	17	2	11	53	39	+14	53	
6	Molde	30	15	7	8	62	31	+31	52	
7	Vålerenga	30	14	7	9	49	41	+8	49	

Source: Football Association of Norway (in Norwegian), Soccerway
Rules for classification: 1) Points; 2) Goal difference; 3) Goals scored; 4) Head-to-head points; 5) Head-to-head goal difference; 6) Head-to-head away goals scored (between two teams).

==== Results summary ====
Overall								Home						Away					
Pld	W	D	L	GF	GA	GD	Pts	W	D	L	GF	GA	GD	W	D	L	GF	GA	GD
30	17	2	11	53	39	+14	53	10	2	3	29	18	+11	7	0	8	24	21	+3

Last updated: 8 November 2015.
Source: see below

==== Results by round ====
Round	1	2	3	4	5	6	7	8	9	10	11	12	13	14	15	16	17	18	19	20	21	22	23	24	25	26	27	28	29	30
Ground	A	H	A	H	A	H	H	A	H	A	H	A	A	H	A	H	A	H	A	H	A	H	A	H	A	H	A	H	A	H
Result	L	W	L	L	W	W	D	W	W	W	L	L	W	W	L	W	W	L	W	W	L	W	W	D	L	W	L	W	L	W
Position	13	9	10	12	9	7	7	7	4	4	5	6	4	5	5	4	4	4	4	3	3	3	3	3	5	5	5	5	5	5

Source: see below
A = Away; H = Home; W = Win; D = Draw; L = Loss

==== Matches ====
6 April 2015 1	Mjøndalen	1–0	Viking	Mjøndalen
15:30 CEST (UTC+2)	Sundli (yellow card) 4'; Olsen (yellow card) 39'; Kapidžić 63'; Gundersen (yellow card) 90+1'; Gauseth (yellow card) 90+4'	Summary	Sigurðsson (yellow card) 15'	Stadium: Isachsen Stadion; Attendance: 2,548; Referee: Brage Sandmoen

12 April 2015 2	Viking	3–1	Tromsø	Stavanger
18:00 CEST (UTC+2)	Ødegaard 20' (o.g.); Bytyqi (yellow card) 45+2' (goal) 75'; Berisha 56'; Nisja (yellow card) 84'	Summary	Åsen 46'	Stadium: Viking stadion Attendance: 9,652; Referee: Ken Henry Johnsen

19 April 2015 3	Stabæk	1–0	Viking	Bærum
18:00 CEST (UTC+2)	Næss (yellow card) 13'; Grossman (yellow card) 68' (goal) 87'	Summary	Mets (yellow card) 90'	Stadium: Nadderud Stadion; Attendance: 3,293; Referee: Tore Hansen

25 April 2015 4	Viking	1–4	Rosenborg	Stavanger
18:00 CEST (UTC+2)	Adegbenro (yellow card) 69'; Abdullahi 77'	Summary	Søderlund 32'; Eyjólfsson (yellow card) 40'; Stranberg (yellow card) 57'; Henderson 82', 86'	Stadium: Viking Stadion; Attendance: 8,769; Referee: Tom Harald Hagen

30 April 2015 5	Sandefjord	1–2	Viking	Sandefjord
18:00 CEST (UTC+2)	Dieng 79'; Bindia (yellow card) 90'	Summary	Abdullahi 46'; Adegbenro (yellow card) 66'; Berisha 82' (pen.)	Stadium: Komplett Arena; Attendance: 3,442; Referee: Trygve Kjensli

4 May 2015 6	Viking	2–1	Molde	Stavanger
19:00 CEST (UTC+2)	Adegbenro 44'; Berisha 72'; Thioune (yellow card) 78'	Summary	Moström (yellow card) 4'; Høiland 22'; Toivio (yellow card) 69'; Singh (yellow card) 87'	Stadium: Viking Stadion; Attendance: 7,086; Referee: Espen Berntsen

10 May 2015 7	Viking	1–1	Odd	Stavanger
18:00 CEST (UTC+2)	de Lanlay 53'; Abdullahi (yellow card) 90'	Summary	Occéan 15'; Hagen (yellow card) 20'; Oldrup Jensen (yellow card) 68'	Stadium: Viking Stadion; Attendance: 12,473; Referee: Svein-Erik Edvartsen

13 May 2015 8	Haugesund	0–2	Viking	Haugesund
18:00 CEST (UTC+2)	Olsen (yellow card) 58'	Summary	de Lanlay 9'; Þorsteinsson (yellow card) 16'; Bödvarsson 85'	Stadium: Haugesund Stadion; Attendance: 6,634; Referee: Dag Vidar Hafsås

16 May 2015 9	Viking	1–0	Start	Stavanger
20:00 CEST (UTC+2)	Mets (yellow card) 54'; Bytyqi 88'	Summary	Christensen (yellow card) 16'	Stadium: Viking Stadion; Attendance: 14,128; Referee: Tommy Skjerven

25 May 2015 10	Aalesund	0–4	Viking	Ålesund
18:00 CEST (UTC+2)	Larsen (yellow card) 35'	Summary	Abdullahi 44'; Berisha 70', 72'; Mets (yellow card) 75'; Böðvarsson 84'	Stadium: Color Line Stadion; Attendance: 6,197; Referee: Trond Ivar Døvle

31 May 2015 11	Viking	3–4	Vålerenga	Stavanger
18:00 CEST (UTC+2)	Adegbenro (yellow card) 33'; Thioune (yellow card) 40'; Berisha 45+4', 82'; Böðvarsson 69'; Sigurðsson (yellow card) 85'	Summary	Zahid 6', 24'; Brown 44'; Larsen (yellow card) 65'; Gunnarsson (yellow card) 77'; Grindheim 90+4'	Stadium: Viking stadion Attendance: 11,519; Referee: Ken Henry Johnsen

7 June 2015 12	Lillestrøm	2–1	Viking	Lillestrøm
20:00 CEST (UTC+2)	Fofana 38'; Knudtzon 45+1'; Pellegrino (yellow card) 69'	Summary	Berisha 59'; Danielsen (yellow card) 70'	Stadium: Åråsen Stadion; Attendance: 4,938; Referee: Ola Hobber Nilsen

21 June 2015 13	Bodø/Glimt	0–3	Viking	Bodø
15:30 CEST (UTC+2)	Saltnes (yellow card) 34'	Summary	Berisha 14' de Lanlay 22'; Adegbenro 35'	Stadium: Aspmyra stadion Attendance: 2,660; Referee: Omar Rafiq

28 June 2015 14	Viking	3–1	Sarpsborg 08	Stavanger
15:30 CEST (UTC+2)	Berisha 36', 58' (yellow card) 37'; Böðvarsson 53'	Summary	Askar (yellow card) 34'; Nordvik 42'	Stadium: Viking Stadion; Attendance: 8,822; Referee: Ola Hobber Nilsen

5 July 2015 15	Strømsgodset	4–1	Viking	Drammen
15:30 CEST (UTC+2)	Ogunjimi 10'; Ogunjimi 15'; Nana (red card) 45'; Wikheim 60'; Vilsvik 78'	Summary	Abdullahi 4'	Stadium: Marienlyst Stadion; Attendance: 7,019; Referee: Martin Lundby

11 July 2015 16	Viking	4–1	Aalesund	Haugesund
15:30 CEST (UTC+2)	Abdullahi 4'; Adegbenro (yellow card) 11'; Böðvarsson 29', 43'; Sigurðsson 65'	Summary	Skagestad (yellow card) 43'; Abdellaoue 61'	Stadium: Haugesund Stadion; Attendance: 7,642; Referee: Trygve Kjensli

24 July 2015 17	Start	0–3	Viking	Kristiansand
19:00 CEST (UTC+2)		Summary	Nisja 4'; Danielsen 36' (pen.); Böðvarsson 38'; Mets (yellow card) 57'	Stadium: Sør Arena; Attendance: 8,871; Referee: Dag Vidar Hafsås

31 July 2015 18	Viking	0–1	Haugesund	Stavanger
19:00 CEST (UTC+2)	Danielsen (yellow card) 42'	Summary	Mets 69' (o.g.); Skjerve (yellow card) 76'	Stadium: Viking Stadion; Attendance: 9,662; Referee: Tommy Skjerven

8 August 2015 19	Sarpsborg 08	0–2	Viking	Sarpsborg
18:00 CEST (UTC+2)	Bellaïd (yellow card) 10'	Summary	Danielsen 44' (pen.); Böðvarsson 81'	Stadium: Sarpsborg Stadion; Attendance: 3,986; Referee: Trygve Kjensli

15 August 2015 20	Viking	2–1	Bodø/Glimt	Stavanger
18:00 CEST (UTC+2)	Danielsen 63' (pen.); Böðvarsson (yellow card) 75'; Nisja 88'	Summary	Sané (yellow card) 22'; Azemi 54'; Valentin (yellow card) 83'	Stadium: Viking Stadion; Attendance: 9,875; Referee: Trond Ivar Døvle

23 August 2015 21	Odd	1–0	Viking	Skien
15:30 CEST (UTC+2)	Nordkvelle 32'	Summary	Þorsteinsson (yellow card) 33'; Sigurðsson (yellow card) 90+4'	Stadium: Skagerak Arena; Attendance: 8,447; Referee: Svein Erik Edvartsen

29 August 2015 22	Viking	2–0	Sandefjord	Stavanger
18:00 CEST (UTC+2)	Bytyqi 31'; Böðvarsson 50'	Summary	Pedersen (yellow card) 62'	Stadium: Viking Stadion; Attendance: 8,884; Referee: Tom Harald Hagen

13 September 2015 23	Vålerenga	2–4	Viking	Oslo
20:00 CEST (UTC+2)	Abdellaoue 7'; Berge (yellow card) 30'; Jääger 64'; Brown (yellow card) 81'	Summary	Abdullahi 11'; Adegbenro 35'; Jørgensen 67'; Moore (yellow card) 83'; Danielsen 85' (pen.)	Stadium: Ullevaal stadion Attendance: 7,198; Referee: Kim Andre Johnsen

18 September 2015 24	Viking	1–1	Strømsgodset	Stavanger
19:00 CEST (UTC+2)	Jørgensen (yellow card) 53'; Adegbenro 78'; Mets (yellow card) 90+1'	Summary	Fossum 15'; Horn (yellow card) 38'; Nana (yellow card) 57'; Tagbajumi (yellow card) 90'	Stadium: Viking Stadion; Attendance: 14,463; Referee: Ola Hobber Nilsen

27 September 2015 25	Rosenborg	2–0	Viking	Trondheim
18:00 CEST (UTC+2)	Midtsjø (yellow card) 38' de Lanlay 45+4'; Søderlund 67'	Summary	Thioune (yellow card) 39'; Nisja (yellow card) 56'; Sverrisson (yellow card) 65'	Stadium: Lerkendal Stadion; Attendance: 14,611; Referee: Anders Johansen

4 October 2015 26	Viking	1–0	Lillestrøm	Stavanger
18:00 CEST (UTC+2)	Þorsteinsson 23'	Summary	Origi (yellow card) 23'	Stadium: Viking Stadion; Attendance: 10,023; Referee: Trygve Kjensli

18 October 2015 27	Tromsø	3–1	Viking	Tromsø
20:00 CET (UTC+1)	Espejord 45+1', 82'; Wangberg (yellow card) 61'; Ødegaard 71'	Summary	Abdullahi 15'; Soares (yellow card) 64'; Sverrisson (yellow card) 77'; Thioune (yellow card) 86'	Stadium: Alfheim Stadion; Attendance: 3,430; Referee: Tore Hansen

25 October 2015 28	Viking	2–1	Stabæk	Stavanger
20:00 CEST (UTC+2)	Danielsen 11'; Abdullahi 70'; Mets (yellow card) 75'; Haugen (yellow card) 78'	Summary	Kassi 24'	Stadium: Viking stadion Attendance: 10,459; Referee: Tom Harald Hagen

1 November 2015 29	Molde	4–1	Viking	Molde
18:00 CET (UTC+1)	Moström 1'; Berge 52'; Elyounoussi 55'; Bakenga 83'	Summary	Haugen (yellow card) 19'; Thioune (yellow card) 45+1'; Sverrisson 80'	Stadium: Aker Stadion; Attendance: 8,220; Referee: Ola Hobber Nilsen

8 November 2015 30	Viking	3–1	Mjøndalen	Stavanger
18:00 CET (UTC+1)	Bytyqi 67'; Haugen 81'; Adegbenro 90+1'	Summary	Midtgarden 8'; Olsen (yellow card) 19'; Kapidžić (yellow card) 47'; Sundli (yellow card) 51'	Stadium: Viking Stadion; Attendance: 10,623; Referee: Svein-Erik Edvartsen

=== Norwegian Cup ===
22 April 2015 First round	Ålgård	0–7	Viking	Ålgård
18:00 CEST (UTC+2)		Summary	Chikere 17', 35' de Lanlay 28'; Nisja 66'; Böðvarsson 89', 90+2', 90+4'	Stadium: Ålgård Stadion; Attendance: 1,224; Referee: Ole Gya

7 May 2015 Second round	Varegg	0–9	Viking	Bergen
18:00 CEST (UTC+2)	T.Ulvestad (yellow card) 79'	Summary	Bytyqi 27'; Chikere 31', 36', 42', 53', 74'; Böðvarsson 69'; Haugen 84'; Soares 90+1'	Stadium: Stemmemyren Idrettsplass; Attendance: 400; Referee: Jan Morten Tennøy

|

3 June 2015 Third round	Arendal	3–5	Viking	Arendal
18:00 CEST (UTC+2)	K.Chopart 26'; Y.Ibrahimaj 32'; Stray 72'	Summary	Chikere 20'; Þorsteinsson 57', 90+2'; Berisha 70'; Soares (yellow card) 82'; Böðvarsson 85'	Stadium: Bjønnes Stadium; Attendance: 1,113; Referee: Tore Hansen

24 June 2015 Fourth round	Kristiansund	2–2 (a.e.t.) (0–3 p)	Viking	Kristiansund
CEST (UTC+2)	Økland 69' (pen.); Lund (yellow card) 100' (goal) 115'	Summary	Abdullahi 61'; Adegbenro 108'	Stadium: Atlanten Stadion; Attendance: 2,673; Referee: Dag Vidar Hafsås
	Penalties
	Økland (penalty missed); Månsson (penalty missed); Lund (penalty missed)		Hoseth (penalty scored); Berisha (penalty scored); Sigurðsson (penalty scored)

12 August 2015 Quarter-final	Viking	3–0	Molde	Stavanger
20:00 CEST (UTC+2)	Adegbenro 22'; Böðvarsson 37'; Sigurðsson (yellow card) 67' (goal) 84'; Mets (yellow card) 90+4'	Summary	Rindarøy (yellow card) 24'; Elyounoussi (yellow card) 55'; Hussain (yellow card) 66'; Forren (yellow card) 83'	Stadium: Viking Stadion; Attendance: 7,864; Referee: Tore Hansen

24 September 2015 Semi-final	Viking	0–1 (a.e.t.)	Sarpsborg 08	Stavanger
20:00 CEST (UTC+2)	Soares (yellow card) 112'	Report	Trondsen (yellow card) 77'; Mortensen 98'	Stadium: Viking Stadion; Attendance: 12,942; Referee: Dag Vidar Hafsås

== Squad statistics ==
As of match played 8 November 2015

=== Appearances and goals ===
No.	Pos	Nat	Player	Total		Tippeligaen		Norwegian Cup	
No.	Pos	Nat	Player	Apps	Goals	Apps	Goals	Apps	Goals
1	GK	(Norway) NOR	Arild Østbø	4	0	0+1	0	3	0
4	DF	(Norway) NOR	Joackim Jørgensen	29	1	21+2	1	6	0
5	DF	(United States) USA	A. J. Soares	23	1	19+1	0	2+1	1
6	DF	(Estonia) EST	Karol Mets	34	0	27+1	0	6	0
7	MF	(Iceland) ISL	Björn Daníel Sverrisson	8	1	3+5	1	0	0
8	MF	(Norway) NOR	Vidar Nisja	23	3	8+11	2	1+3	1
10	FW	(England) ENG	Kieffer Moore	11	0	1+8	0	0+2	0
11	MF	(Senegal) SEN	Makhtar Thioune	27	0	17+6	0	3+1	0
14	MF	(Norway) NOR	André Danielsen	36	5	30	5	5+1	0
17	FW	(Iceland) ISL	Jón Daði Böðvarsson	35	15	22+7	9	5+1	6
19	FW	(Nigeria) NGR	Suleiman Abdullahi	31	9	24+3	8	4	1
20	DF	(Iceland) ISL	Indriði Sigurðsson	31	2	25+1	1	4+1	1
21	MF	(Norway) NOR	Julian Veen Uldal	1	0	0+1	0	0	0
23	MF	(Iceland) ISL	Steinþór Freyr Þorsteinsson	26	3	7+13	1	6	2
24	DF	(Norway) NOR	Aleksander Solli	2	0	0+2	0	0	0
25	MF	(Norway) NOR	Rasmus Martinsen	1	0	0+1	0	0	0
26	FW	(Nigeria) NGR	Samuel Adegbenro	28	7	23+1	5	2+2	2
27	MF	(Norway) NOR	Zymer Bytyqi	25	5	12+9	4	3+1	1
28	DF	(Norway) NOR	Kristoffer Haugen	36	2	30	1	6	1
30	GK	(Norway) NOR	Iven Austbø	33	0	30	0	3	0
50	MF	(Norway) NOR	Herman Kleppa	1	0	0+1	0	0	0
51	DF	(Norway) NOR	Julian Ryerson	2	0	0+2	0	0	0
Players away from Viking on loan:
Players who left Viking during the season:
9	MF	(Norway) NOR	Magne Hoseth	12	0	1+8	0	2+1	0
10	FW	(Norway) NOR	Veton Berisha	16	12	14	11	0+2	1
16	MF	(Norway) NOR	Yann-Erik de Lanlay	18	4	16	3	2	1
18	FW	(Nigeria) NGR	Osita Henry Chikere	8	8	0+5	0	3	8

=== Goal scorers ===
Place	Position	Nation	Number	Name	Tippeligaen	Norwegian Cup	Total
1	FW	(Iceland)	17	Jón Daði Böðvarsson	9	6	15
2	FW	(Norway)	10	Veton Berisha	11	1	12
3	FW	(Nigeria)	19	Suleiman Abdullahi	8	1	9
4	FW	(Nigeria)	18	Osita Henry Chikere	0	8	8
5	FW	(Nigeria)	26	Samuel Adegbenro	5	2	7
6	MF	(Norway)	14	André Danielsen	5	0	5
6	MF	(Norway)	27	Zymer Bytyqi	4	1	5
8	MF	(Norway)	16	Yann-Erik de Lanlay	3	1	4
9	MF	(Norway)	8	Vidar Nisja	2	1	3
9	MF	(Iceland)	23	Steinþór Freyr Þorsteinsson	1	2	3
11	DF	(Iceland)	20	Indriði Sigurðsson	1	1	2
11	DF	(Norway)	28	Kristoffer Haugen	1	1	2
13	MF	(Norway)	4	Joackim Jørgensen	1	0	1
13	MF	(Iceland)	7	Björn Daníel Sverrisson	1	0	1
13	DF	(United States)	5	A. J. Soares	0	1	1
13				Own goal	1	0	1
				TOTALS	53	26	79

=== Disciplinary record ===
Number	Nation	Position	Name	Tippeligaen		Norwegian Cup		Total	
Number	Nation	Position	Name	Yellow card	Red card	Yellow card	Red card	Yellow card	Red card
4	(Norway)	DF	Joackim Jørgensen	1	0	0	0	1	0
5	(United States)	DF	A. J. Soares	1	0	2	0	3	0
6	(Estonia)	DF	Karol Mets	6	0	1	0	7	0
7	(Iceland)	MF	Björn Daníel Sverrisson	2	0	0	0	2	0
8	(Norway)	MF	Vidar Nisja	2	0	0	0	2	0
10	(Norway)	FW	Veton Berisha	1	0	0	0	1	0
10	(England)	FW	Kieffer Moore	1	0	0	0	1	0
11	(Senegal)	MF	Makhtar Thioune	5	0	0	0	5	0
14	(Norway)	MF	André Danielsen	2	0	0	0	2	0
17	(Iceland)	FW	Jón Daði Böðvarsson	1	0	0	0	1	0
19	(Nigeria)	FW	Suleiman Abdullahi	1	0	0	0	1	0
20	(Iceland)	DF	Indriði Sigurðsson	3	0	1	0	4	0
23	(Iceland)	MF	Steinþór Freyr Þorsteinsson	2	0	0	0	2	0
26	(Nigeria)	FW	Samuel Adegbenro	4	0	0	0	4	0
27	(Norway)	MF	Zymer Bytyqi	1	0	0	0	1	0
28	(Norway)	DF	Kristoffer Haugen	2	0	0	0	2	0
			TOTALS	35	0	4	0	39	0
