= 2014 Viking FK season =

Viking
2014 season
- Chairman: Christian Rugland
- Manager: Kjell Jonevret
- Stadium: Viking Stadion
- Tippeligaen: 10th
- Norwegian Cup: Quarter-final
- Top goalscorer: League: Vidar Nisja (9); All: Björn Daníel Sverrisson (10)
- Highest home attendance: 11,693 vs Rosenborg (31 August 2014)
- Lowest home attendance: 2,300 vs Sogndal (31 August 2014)
- Average home league attendance: 9,532
Home colours	Away colours

The 2014 season was Viking's second full season with Kjell Jonevret as manager. They competed in the Tippeligaen and were knocked out of the cup at the Quarterfinal stage by Molde.

== Squad ==
Note: Flags indicate national team as defined under FIFA eligibility rules; some limited exceptions apply. Players may hold more than one non-FIFA nationality.

No.	Pos.	Nation	Player
1	GK	NOR	Arild Østbø
2	DF	NOR	Trond Erik Bertelsen
4	MF	NOR	Joackim Jørgensen
5	DF	ISL	Sverrir Ingi Ingason
6	DF	NOR	Håkon Skogseid
7	MF	ISL	Björn Daníel Sverrisson
8	MF	NOR	Vidar Nisja
10	FW	NOR	Veton Berisha
11	MF	SEN	Makhtar Thioune
13	MF	NOR	Christian Landu Landu

No.	Pos.	Nation	Player
14	MF	NOR	André Danielsen (Vice captain)
16	FW	NOR	Yann-Erik de Lanlay
17	FW	ISL	Jón Daði Böðvarsson
18	FW	NGR	Osita Henry Chikere
20	DF	ISL	Indriði Sigurðsson (Captain)
21	MF	NOR	Julian Veen Uldal
23	FW	ISL	Steinþór Freyr Þorsteinsson
25	DF	NOR	Rasmus Martinsen
28	MF	NOR	Kristoffer Haugen
30	GK	NOR	Iven Austbø

== Transfers ==
=== Winter ===
In: Note: Flags indicate national team as defined under FIFA eligibility rules; some limited exceptions apply. Players may hold more than one non-FIFA nationality.

No.	Pos.	Nation	Player
1	GK	NOR	Arild Østbø (loan return from (Norway) Strømmen)
4	MF	NOR	Joackim Jørgensen (from (Sweden) Elfsborg)
5	DF	ISL	Sverrir Ingi Ingason (from (Iceland) Breiðablik)
7	MF	ISL	Björn Daníel Sverrisson (from (Iceland) FH)
23	MF	ISL	Steinþór Freyr Þorsteinsson (from (Norway) Sandnes Ulf)
30	GK	NOR	Iven Austbø (from (Norway) Sandefjord)

Out: Note: Flags indicate national team as defined under FIFA eligibility rules; some limited exceptions apply. Players may hold more than one non-FIFA nationality.

No.	Pos.	Nation	Player
1	GK	NOR	Rune Jarstein (to (Germany) Hertha Berlin)
3	DF	NOR	Johan Lædre Bjørdal (to (Denmark) AGF)
6	DF	COD	Richard Ekunde (to (Sweden) GAIS)
9	FW	SWE	Patrik Ingelsten (to (Sweden) Mjällby)
11	FW	FRO	Jóan Símun Edmundsson (to (Faroe Islands) AB)
18	MF	NOR	Jon-Helge Tveita (to (Norway) Bryne, previously on loan)
19	MF	GHA	King Gyan (to (Sweden) Halmstad)
21	FW	EST	Henri Anier (to (Scotland) Motherwell, previously on loan)
22	GK	NOR	Christoffer Midbøe Lunde (to (Norway) Sola)
23	FW	AUT	Benjamin Sulimani (to (Austria) Admira Wacker)
25	MF	NOR	Eirik Schulze (to (Norway) Strømmen)
27	FW	NOR	Trond Olsen (to (Norway) Bodø/Glimt)

=== Summer ===
In: Note: Flags indicate national team as defined under FIFA eligibility rules; some limited exceptions apply. Players may hold more than one non-FIFA nationality.

No.	Pos.	Nation	Player

Out: Note: Flags indicate national team as defined under FIFA eligibility rules; some limited exceptions apply. Players may hold more than one non-FIFA nationality.

No.	Pos.	Nation	Player
24	GK	NOR	Pål Vestly Heigre (to (Norway) Start)

== Competitions ==
=== Tippeligaen ===
==== Table ====
Pos	Team	Pld	W	D	L	GF	GA	GD	Pts
8	Sarpsborg 08	30	10	10	10	41	48	−7	40
9	Stabæk	30	11	6	13	44	52	−8	39
10	Viking	30	8	12	10	42	42	0	36
11	Haugesund	30	10	6	14	43	49	−6	36
12	Start	30	10	5	15	47	60	−13	35

Source: fotball.no
Rules for classification: 1) points; 2) goal difference; 3) number of goals scored.

==== Results summary ====
Overall								Home						Away					
Pld	W	D	L	GF	GA	GD	Pts	W	D	L	GF	GA	GD	W	D	L	GF	GA	GD
30	8	12	10	42	42	0	36	4	5	6	24	23	+1	4	7	4	18	19	−1

==== Results by round ====
Round	1	2	3	4	5	6	7	8	9	10	11	12	13	14	15	16	17	18	19	20	21	22	23	24	25	26	27	28	29	30
Ground	A	H	A	H	A	A	H	A	H	A	H	A	H	H	A	H	A	H	A	H	A	H	A	H	A	H	A	H	H	A
Result	D	D	W	W	W	W	D	D	D	L	L	D	W	L	D	D	W	D	D	W	D	L	L	L	L	L	D	L	W	L
Position	6	11	6	3	3	2	3	3	3	4	8	7	7	7	7	7	6	7	7	7	7	7	7	7	8	10	9	11	8	10

Updated to match(es) played on 9 November 2014. Source: see below
A = Away; H = Home; W = Win; D = Draw; L = Loss

==== Matches ====
29 March 2014 1	Rosenborg	2–2	Viking	Trondheim
18:00 CET (UTC+1)	Mix 64'; Dorsin 68'	Summary	Böðvarsson 87', 90'	Stadium: Lerkendal Stadion; Attendance: 16,287; Referee: Tommy Skjerven

4 April 2014 2	Viking	0–0	Strømsgodset	Stavanger
19:00 CEST (UTC+2)	Jørgensen (yellow card) 8'	Summary	Kastrati (yellow card) 39'; Ovenstad (yellow card) 66'; Júnior (yellow card) 77'	Stadium: Viking Stadion; Attendance: 12,090; Referee: Dag Vidar Hafsås

12 April 2014 3	Lillestrøm	0–1	Viking	Lillestrøm
15:30 CEST (UTC+2)		Summary	Böðvarsson 86'	Stadium: Åråsen Stadion; Attendance: 5157; Referee: Per Ivar Staberg

21 April 2014 4	Viking	2–0	Haugesund	Stavanger
15:30 CEST (UTC+2)	Ingason 25'; Sigurðsson (yellow card) 31'; Þorsteinsson 40'	Summary	Cvetinović (yellow card) 43'; Bamberg (yellow card) 58'	Stadium: Viking Stadion; Attendance: 11,174; Referee: Kjetil Sælen

27 April 2014 5	Start	0–2	Viking	Kristiansand
19:00 CEST (UTC+2)	Berger (yellow card) 90+3'	Summary	de Lanlay 5'; Þorsteinsson 20'; Sigurðsson (yellow card) 57'; Ingason (yellow card) 77'	Stadium: Sør Arena; Attendance: 7,570; Referee: Andres Johansen

1 May 2014 6	Aalesund	1–2	Viking	Ålesund
15:30 CEST (UTC+2)	Arnefjord (yellow card) 60'; Grytten 76'	Summary	Tollås 35' (o.g.); Sverrisson 56'; Danielsen (yellow card) 62'	Stadium: Color Line Stadion; Attendance: 8,289; Referee: Trond Døvle

5 May 2014 7	Viking	1–1	Odd	Stavanger
19:00 CEST (UTC+2)	Thioune (yellow card) 26'; Chikere (yellow card) 83'; Ingason 86' (yellow card) 90+5'	Summary	Hansen (yellow card) 39'; Samuelsen (yellow card) 57'; Jensen (yellow card) 71'; Rashani 77'	Stadium: Viking Stadion; Attendance: 9,286; Referee: Ken Henry Johnsen

11 May 2014 8	Vålerenga	1–1	Viking	Oslo
18:00 CEST (UTC+2)	Kjartansson 1'; Mathisen (yellow card) 41'	Summary	Þorsteinsson (yellow card) 37'; Sigurðsson 51'	Stadium: Ullevaal Stadion; Attendance: 8,280; Referee: Anders Johansen

16 May 2014 9	Viking	2–2	Sandnes Ulf	Stavanger
18:00 CEST (UTC+2)	Nisja 57', 71'; Sigurðsson (yellow card) 90+2'	Summary	Lennon 14'; Aanestad (yellow card) 29'; Rubio 48'; Jaiteh (yellow card) 80'; Sandberg (yellow card) 86'; Sola (yellow card) 90+2'	Stadium: Viking Stadion; Attendance: 16,508; Referee: Tore Hansen

20 May 2014 10	Molde	1–0	Viking	Molde
18:00 CEST (UTC+2)	Elyounoussi 90+3'	Summary		Stadium: Aker Stadion; Attendance: 8,847; Referee: Dag Vidar Hafsås

25 May 2014 11	Viking	2–3	Bodø/Glimt	Stavanger
18:00 CEST (UTC+2)	Sverrisson 19'; Nisja 45+1'	Summary	N'Diaye 26' (yellow card) 45+4'; Karlsen 50', 63'; Laajab (yellow card) 83'; Olsen (yellow card) 84'; Sané (yellow card) 90+4'	Stadium: Viking Stadion; Attendance: 9,682; Referee: Brage Sandmoen

9 June 2014 12	Sarpsborg 08	1–1	Viking	Sarpsborg
15:30 CEST (UTC+2)	K.Berge (yellow card) 36'; Ernemann 61'; Samuel (yellow card) 77'; Dja Djédjé (yellow card) 87'	Summary	Sverrisson (yellow card) 45+3'; Böðvarsson 46'	Stadium: Sarpsborg Stadion; Attendance: 3,810; Referee: Anders Johansen

12 June 2014 13	Viking	4–1	Stabæk	Stavanger
18:00 CEST (UTC+2)	Danielsen 45+2'; Böðvarsson 59'; Sverrisson 68'; Þorsteinsson 86'	Summary	Trondsen (yellow card) 15'; Thorsby 84'	Stadium: Viking Stadion; Attendance: 8,685; Referee: Dag Vidar Hafsås

6 July 2014 14	Viking	0–2	Brann	Stavanger
18:00 CEST (UTC+2)		Summary	Grønner 17' (yellow card) 61'; Orlov 35'	Stadium: Viking Stadion; Attendance: 9,931; Referee: Per Ivar Staberg

12 July 2014 15	Sogndal	0–0	Viking	Sogndalsfjøra
15:30 CEST (UTC+2)		Summary		Stadium: Fosshaugane Campus; Attendance: 2,875; Referee: Omar Rafiq

20 July 2014 16	Viking	0–0	Lillestrøm	Stavanger
19:00 CEST (UTC+2)	Sigurðsson (yellow card) 70'	Summary	Fofana (yellow card) 39'; Mikalsen (yellow card) 65'	Stadium: Viking Stadion; Attendance: 7,828; Referee: Espen Berntsen

27 July 2014 17	Brann	0–1	Viking	Bergen
20:00 CEST (UTC+2)		Summary	Sverrisson 35'; Østbø (yellow card) 78'	Stadium: Brann Stadion; Attendance: 8,792; Referee: Omar Rafiq

2 August 2014 18	Viking	5–5	Vålerenga	Stavanger
18:00 CEST (UTC+2)	Danielsen (yellow card) 8'; Sigurðsson 44'; Thioune 57'; Nisja 75', 84'; Sverrisson 90'	Summary	Larsen 9'; S.Nilsen (yellow card) 32'; Kjartansson 39', 61', 68' (yellow card) 86'; Zahid 66'	Stadium: Viking Stadion; Attendance: 8,460; Referee: Tommy Skjerven

10 August 2014 19	Haugesund	1–1	Viking	Haugesund
19:00 CEST (UTC+2)	Gytkjær 19'; Anyora (yellow card) 25'	Summary	Chikere 74'; Bertelsen (yellow card) 89'	Stadium: Haugesund Stadion; Attendance: 7,002; Referee: Ola Hobber Nilsen

16 August 2014 20	Viking	4–2	Sogndal	Stavanger
15:30 CEST (UTC+2)	Sigurðsson (yellow card) 25' (goal) 27'; Haugen 69'; Nisja 80' de Lanlay 90+3'	Summary	Valgarðsson (yellow card) 16'; Flo 21'; Brochmann 37'; Strand (yellow card) 70'; Patronen (yellow card) 75'	Stadium: Viking Stadion; Attendance: 8,260; Referee: Trond Ivar Døvle

22 August 2014 21	Sandnes Ulf	2–2	Viking	Sandnes
19:00 CEST (UTC+2)	Brenes 39', 53'; Raskaj (yellow card) 75'	Summary	Nisja (yellow card) 40'; Þorsteinsson 41'; Sverrisson 80'	Stadium: Sandnes Idrettspark; Attendance: 4,418; Referee: Andres Johansen

31 August 2014 22	Viking	1–2	Rosenborg	Stavanger
18:00 CEST (UTC+2)	Sverrisson (yellow card) 10'; Skogseid 76'	Summary	Skjelvik 13'; Jensen 34'; Örlund (yellow card) 86'; Riski (yellow card) 90+4'	Stadium: Viking Stadion; Attendance: 11,693; Referee: Ken Henry Johnsen

13 September 2014 23	Odd	4–1	Viking	Skien
15:30 CEST (UTC+2)	Samuelsen 8'; Bentley 50'; Johnsen 52'; Shala 71'	Summary	Grøgaard 4' (o.g.)	Stadium: Skagerak Arena; Attendance: 8,399; Referee: Trond Ivar Døvle

21 September 2014 24	Viking	0–1	Start	Stavanger
15:30 CEST (UTC+2)	Böðvarsson (yellow card) 55'; Jørgensen (yellow card) 73'	Summary	Vilhjálmsson 68'; Asante (yellow card) 86'	Stadium: Viking Stadion; Attendance: 9,545; Referee: Ola Hobber Nilsen

27 September 2014 25	Strømsgodset	2–1	Viking	Stavanger
18:00 CEST (UTC+2)	Abu (yellow card) 20'; Adjei-Boateng 37'; Storflor 51'	Summary	Landu Landu 41'; Sigurðsson (yellow card) 76'	Stadium: Viking Stadion; Attendance: 6,179; Referee: Svein-Erik Edvartsen

4 October 2014 26	Viking	1–2	Molde	Stavanger
18:00 CEST (UTC+2)	Nisja 8'; Danielsen (yellow card) 45+1'; Østbø (yellow card) 62'; Haugen (yellow card) 87'	Summary	Flo (yellow card) 30'; Singh (yellow card) 45+1' (goal) 63' (pen.); Hussain (yellow card) 46'; Sigurðarson 78'	Stadium: Viking Stadion; Attendance: 7,730; Referee: Omar Rafiq

19 October 2014 27	Stabæk	1–1	Viking	Bærum
18:00 CEST (UTC+2)	Høiland 73' (pen.)	Summary	Berisha 32'	Stadium: Nadderud Stadion; Attendance: 3,941; Referee: Anders Johansen

26 October 2014 28	Viking	1–2	Aalesund	Stavanger
18:00 CET (UTC+1)	Ingason 80'	Summary	James 20' 24'; Mattila (yellow card) 30'; Arnefjord (yellow card) 42'; Latifu (yellow card) 74'	Stadium: Viking Stadion; Attendance: 10,850; Referee: Brage Sandmoen

2 November 2014 29	Viking	1–0	Sarpsborg 08	Stavanger
18:00 CET (UTC+1)	Nisja 55'; Ingason (yellow card) 60'	Summary	Berthod (yellow card) 86'	Stadium: Viking Stadion; Attendance: 8,492; Referee: Martin Lundby

9 November 2014 30	Bodø/Glimt	3–2	Viking	Bodø
18:00 CET (UTC+1)	Moe 50'; Konradsen 54'; Laajab 74'	Summary	Nisja 44'; Sané 71' (o.g.)	Stadium: Aspmyra Stadion; Attendance: 2,533; Referee: Dag Vidar Hafsås

=== Norwegian Cup ===
24 April 2014 First round	Brodd	0–3	Viking	Stavanger
18:00 CEST (UTC+2)		Summary	Chikere 12', (yellow card) 69'; Berisha 15' de Lanlay 43'	Stadium: Midjord Idrettspark; Attendance: 1,500; Referee: Ole Gya

8 May 2014 Second round	Sola	1–7	Viking	Sola
18:00 CEST (UTC+2)	Ross (yellow card) 25'; K.Kaeophu (yellow card) 49'; Kanu 65'; A.J.Nilsen (yellow card) 66'	Summary	Chikere 15', 53'; Sverrisson 23', 47'; Landu-Landu 29'; Ingason 33'; Hummervoll 88'	Stadium: Sola Stadium; Attendance: 1,273; Referee: Daniel Higraff

4 June 2014 Third round	Egersund	0–3	Viking	Egersund
18:00 CEST (UTC+2)		Summary	Þorsteinsson 12'; Sverrisson 25'; Berisha 76'	Stadium: Idrettsparken; Attendance: 1,520; Referee: Ole Gya

24 April 2014 Fourth round	Viking	4–1	Sogndal	Stavanger
19:00 CEST (UTC+2)	de Lanlay 25'; Sverrisson 57'; Böðvarsson 77'; Dyngeland 90' (o.g.)	Summary	Karadas 72'	Stadium: Viking Stadion; Attendance: 2,300; Referee: Brage Sandmoen

13 August 2014 Quarter-final	Molde	5–1	Viking	Molde
20:00 CEST (UTC+2)	Chima 14'; Hestad (yellow card) 29'; Elyounoussi 40'; Moström 50'; Flo 58'; Gulbrandsen 68'	Summary	Sigurðsson (yellow card) 16' de Lanlay 32'	Stadium: Aker Stadion; Attendance: 5,015; Referee: Tommy Skjerven

== Squad statistics ==
As of match played 9 November 2013

=== Appearances and goals ===
No.	Pos	Nat	Player	Total		Tippeligaen		Norwegian Cup	
No.	Pos	Nat	Player	Apps	Goals	Apps	Goals	Apps	Goals
1	GK	(Norway) NOR	Arild Østbø	20	0	18	0	2	0
2	DF	(Norway) NOR	Trond Erik Bertelsen	13	0	12	0	1	0
4	MF	(Norway) NOR	Joackim Jørgensen	31	0	25+2	0	4	0
5	DF	(Iceland) ISL	Sverrir Ingi Ingason	34	4	29	3	5	1
6	DF	(Norway) NOR	Håkon Skogseid	16	1	8+5	1	3	0
7	MF	(Iceland) ISL	Björn Daníel Sverrisson	33	10	27+2	6	4	4
8	MF	(Norway) NOR	Vidar Nisja	30	9	20+8	9	1+1	0
10	FW	(Norway) NOR	Veton Berisha	29	3	10+15	1	2+2	2
11	MF	(Senegal) SEN	Makhtar Thioune	28	1	12+12	1	4	0
13	MF	(Norway) NOR	Christian Landu Landu	20	2	7+9	1	2+2	1
14	MF	(Norway) NOR	André Danielsen	31	1	28	1	3	0
16	FW	(Norway) NOR	Yann-Erik de Lanlay	30	5	26	2	4	3
17	FW	(Iceland) ISL	Jón Daði Böðvarsson	32	6	24+5	5	2+1	1
18	FW	(Nigeria) NGR	Osita Henry Chikere	18	4	3+10	1	3+2	3
20	DF	(Iceland) ISL	Indriði Sigurðsson	30	3	26	3	4	0
21	MF	(Norway) NOR	Julian Veen Uldal	2	0	0+1	0	0+1	0
23	FW	(Iceland) ISL	Steinþór Freyr Þorsteinsson	32	5	24+4	4	4	1
25	DF	(Norway) NOR	Rasmus Martinsen	3	0	0+1	0	1+1	0
26	DF	(Norway) NOR	Paul Fjelde	3	0	0+1	0	0+2	0
27	FW	(Norway) NOR	Martin Hummervoll	2	1	1	0	0+1	1
28	MF	(Norway) NOR	Kristoffer Haugen	27	1	18+5	1	3+1	0
29	FW	(Norway) NOR	Carl Henrik Sirevaag Refvik	1	0	0+1	0	0	0
30	GK	(Norway) NOR	Iven Austbø	16	0	12+1	0	3	0
Players away from Viking on loan:
Players who left Viking during the season:

=== Goal scorers ===
Place	Position	Nation	Number	Name	Tippeligaen	Norwegian Cup	Total
1	MF	(Iceland)	7	Björn Daníel Sverrisson	6	4	10
2	MF	(Norway)	8	Vidar Nisja	9	0	9
3	FW	(Iceland)	17	Jón Daði Böðvarsson	5	1	6
4	FW	(Norway)	16	Yann-Erik de Lanlay	2	3	5
4	MF	(Iceland)	23	Steinþór Freyr Þorsteinsson	4	1	5
6	DF	(Iceland)	5	Sverrir Ingi Ingason	3	1	4
6				Own goal	3	1	4
6	FW	(Nigeria)	18	Osita Henry Chikere	1	3	4
9	DF	(Iceland)	20	Indriði Sigurðsson	3	0	3
9	FW	(Norway)	10	Veton Berisha	1	2	3
11	DF	(Norway)	13	Christian Landu Landu	1	1	2
12	MF	(Norway)	14	André Danielsen	1	0	1
12	MF	(Senegal)	11	Makhtar Thioune	1	0	1
12	DF	(Norway)	28	Kristoffer Haugen	1	0	1
12	DF	(Norway)	6	Håkon Skogseid	1	0	1
12	FW	(Norway)	27	Martin Hummervoll	0	1	1
				TOTALS	41	18	59

=== Disciplinary record ===
Number	Nation	Position	Name	Tippeligaen		Norwegian Cup		Total	
Number	Nation	Position	Name	Yellow card	Red card	Yellow card	Red card	Yellow card	Red card
1	(Norway)	GK	Arild Østbø	2	0	0	0	2	0
2	(Norway)	DF	Trond Erik Bertelsen	1	0	0	0	1	0
4	(Norway)	MF	Joackim Jørgensen	2	0	0	0	2	0
5	(Iceland)	DF	Sverrir Ingi Ingason	3	0	0	0	3	0
7	(Iceland)	MF	Björn Daníel Sverrisson	2	0	0	0	2	0
8	(Norway)	MF	Vidar Nisja	1	0	0	0	1	0
11	(Senegal)	MF	Makhtar Thioune	1	0	0	0	1	0
14	(Norway)	MF	André Danielsen	3	0	0	0	3	0
17	(Iceland)	FW	Jón Daði Böðvarsson	1	0	0	0	1	0
18	(Nigeria)	FW	Osita Henry Chikere	1	0	1	0	2	0
20	(Iceland)	DF	Indriði Sigurðsson	6	0	1	0	7	0
23	(Iceland)	MF	Steinþór Freyr Þorsteinsson	1	0	0	0	1	0
28	(Norway)	DF	Kristoffer Haugen	1	0	0	0	1	0
			TOTALS	25	0	2	0	27	0
