= Sverrir Ingi Ingason =

Icelandic footballer

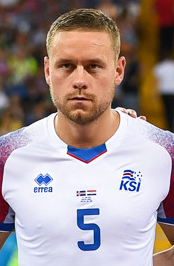
- Sverrir with Iceland at the 2018 FIFA World Cup

Personal information
- Date of birth: 5 August 1993 (age 33)
- Place of birth: Kópavogur, Iceland
- Height: 1.88 m (6 ft 2 in)
- Position: Centre-back

Team information
- Current team: Panathinaikos
- Number: 15

Youth career
- 1997–2011: Breiðablik

Senior career*
Years	Team	Apps	(Gls)
2011–2013	Breiðablik	42	(2)
2011	→ Augnablik (loan)	4	(1)
2014–2015	Viking	29	(3)
2015–2017	Lokeren	67	(1)
2017	Granada	17	(1)
2017–2019	Rostov	45	(5)
2019–2023	PAOK	105	(15)
2023–2024	Midtjylland	24	(2)
2024–	Panathinaikos	42	(1)

International career^{‡}
2009	Iceland U17	3	(0)
2010	Iceland U19	3	(0)
2012–2014	Iceland U21	11	(1)
2014–	Iceland	66	(4)
- * Club domestic league appearances and goals as of 19 April 2026 ‡ National team caps and goals as of 28 March 2026

Sverrir Ingi Ingason (born 5 August 1993) is an Icelandic professional footballer who plays as a centre back for Greek Super League club Panathinaikos and the Iceland national team.

Sverrir previously played for Icelandic club Breiðablik UBK before transferring to Viking FK. After a successful spell at the Norwegian club he moved to Lokeren of Belgium.

An Icelandic international, he participated at the UEFA Euro 2016 and the 2018 World Cup with the senior team.

== Early life ==
Sverrir was born in Kópavogur, a town near by the capital of Iceland, Reykjavík. He started playing football at the age of 4 at his local club Breiðablik. The club is known for its great youth system which has produced players like Willum Þór Willumsson, Alfreð Finnbogason and Jóhann Berg Guðmundsson.

== Club career ==
=== Breiðablik ===
In 2011 at the age of 18 Sverrir started playing for Breiðablik's feeder club Augnablik. He quickly got the attention of the parent's club manager, Ólafur Kristjánsson, who made Sverrir one of his key players. After that season 2012–13 he was voted the most promising player in Breiðablik.

In the season 2013–14 he became one of the best players in the league. He was voted the best player of Breiðablik and made it into the divisions team of the year.

=== Viking ===
Sverrir was the subject of transfer speculation, with the player linked to several clubs. On 1 January 2014 he decided to sign for Norwegian club Viking FK. At the club he played along with four other Icelandic players, Indriði Sigurðsson, Jón Daði Böðvarsson, Steinþór Freyr Þorsteinsson and Björn Daníel Sverrisson.

Sverrir was influential early on and right away started all the games in the heart of defence alongside the club's captain and one of Iceland's most experienced centre backs, Indriði Sigurdsson. After his first season, he was voted Viking FK best player of 2014.

=== Lokeren ===
One year later, in February 2015 Sverrir opted for a move to Lokeren. His debut with the new club was made one week later against Oostende for the league playing for 90 minutes. Making great appearances and playing all the matches for his club, Lokeren finished 8th for the Regular season and 1st for the Europa League playoffs. The next season Ingi made 32 appearances and scoring his only goal with the club against Standard Liège on 13 September. With his market value going up after another 21 appearances on 2016–17 season with the Tricolores, in January 2017 Granada CF made a move to take his signature for €1.8 million.

He stayed in Belgium making 70 appearances and scoring one goal.

=== Granada ===
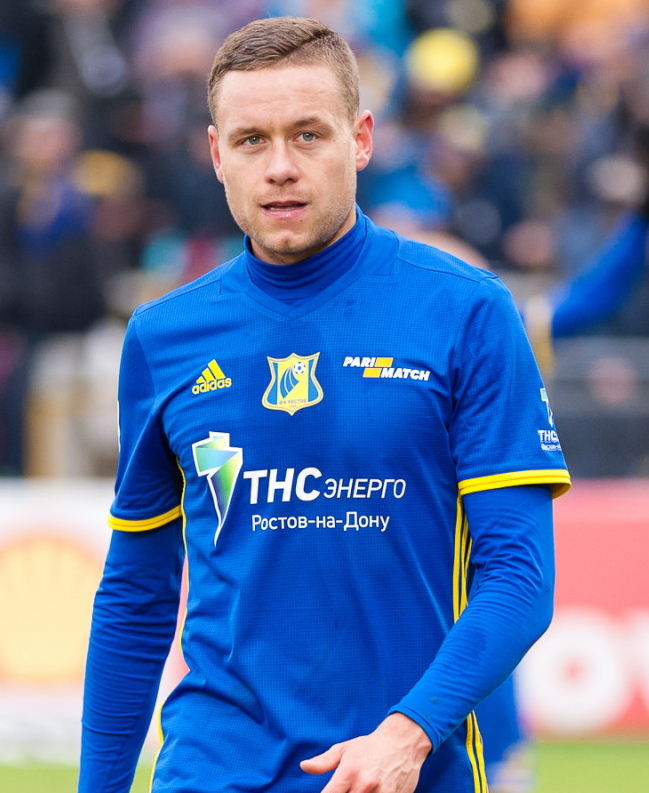
Ingason with Rostov in 2018

Sverrir moved to Andalusia for the first semester of 2017, joining Granada. He maintained his high level of performances, but his team could not avoid relegation. In the summer of 2017, FC Rostov paid €1.2 million to secure his services.

=== Rostov ===
On 30 June 2017, Russian Premier League side Rostov announced the signing of Sverrir on a three-year contract. Ingi united in Rostov with his national teammates Ragnar Sigurðsson and Björn Bergmann Sigurðarson finding there a good atmosphere to settle up on a new country. Full season for Ingarson making 30 appearances and scoring three goals overall for the Selmashi and finished 11th in the League also got to the Round of 16 Russian Cup.

In the 2018–19 season, making a good start, Ingason played 17 matches and scored twice.

On the winter transfer window on the same season PAOK made the move to buy him for a €4.5 million transfer fee.

=== PAOK ===
On 1 February 2019, Sverrir joined Greek club PAOK on a three-and-a-half-year contract. During the 2018–19 season Ingasson won the double with PAOK. On 1 December 2019, he scored his first goal with the club in an away derby match against rivals Olympiakos in a final 1–1 draw. On 23 December 2019, he scored a brace in a hammering 5–1 home win against Atromitos and the club will celebrate Christmas 2019 at the top of the Super League I table.

The following year 2019–20 he had an upgraded role in the team, playing in a total of 34 games, while offering four goals and one assist. In 2020–221, he was, for another year, a key member of the team for most of the season. In the final of the year, he suffered an injury that left him out for a long time. Nevertheless, he was crowned Greek cup winner for the second time with the PAOK jersey. In the final on 22 May, PAOK faced Olympiacos and prevailed with a score of 2–1. He did not play due to his injury.

On 1 February 2021, PAOK rejected a €5 million offer from an unnamed English club for his services.

Coming back from a long period of recovery from an injury, Sverrir temporarily played for PAOK B in Super League Greece 2, and made his debut on the first match of the season, on 6 November 2021.

The "black and white" announced the extension of its cooperation with Ingi Ingasson until the summer of 2025. "Let's go PAOKara", the first message of the Icelandic stopper. The agreement that existed a week ago between PAOK and Ingi Ingasson became official, with the "black and white" formalizing the event on Wednesday afternoon (23/2/22). After the successful 2021–22 season and the turbulent 2022–23 season, in which Ingasson remained a vital part of the squad, he was released in the summer of 2023, having left an important mark on the club in his 4 1/2-year service at Thessaloniki.

== International career ==
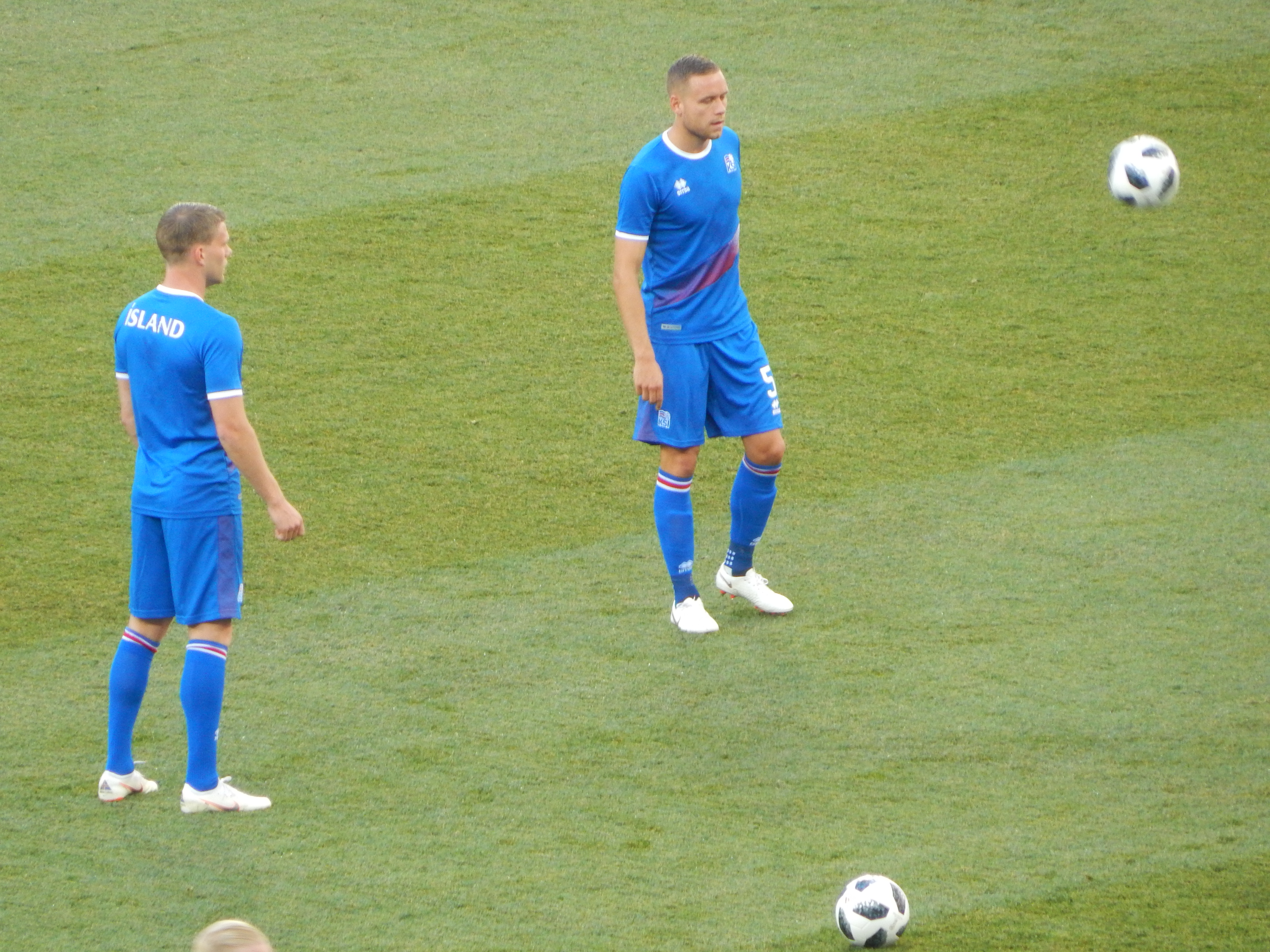
Ingason with Iceland in 2018

Sverrir was an Icelandic youth international, having earned caps at under-18, under-20 and at the under-21 level. He captained his side at the UEFA Euro Under-21s in 2015 where they lost against Denmark in the play-offs on away goals. He made his debut for the senior national team in January 2014 against Sweden. He was part of the squad which made it to the quarter-finals of the UEFA Euro 2016.

In May 2018, he was named in Iceland's 23-man squad for the 2018 World Cup in Russia.

== Career statistics ==
=== Club ===
As of match played 11 May 2025

Appearances and goals by club, season and competition
Club	Season	Division	League		Cup		Continental		Other		Total	
Club	Season	Division	Apps	Goals	Apps	Goals	Apps	Goals	Apps	Goals	Apps	Goals
Augnablik (loan)	2011	3. deild	4	1	0	0	—		—		4	1
Breiðablik	2011	Úrvalsdeild	0	0	5	0	—		—		5	0
Breiðablik	2012	Úrvalsdeild	21	2	11	1	—		—		32	3
Breiðablik	2013	Úrvalsdeild	21	0	13	4	6	0	—		40	4
Breiðablik	Total		42	2	29	5	6	0	—		77	7
Viking	2014	Tippeligaen	29	3	5	1	—		—		34	4
Lokeren	2014–15	Belgian Pro League	14	0	—		—		—		14	0
Lokeren	2015–16	Belgian Pro League	32	1	1	0	—		—		33	1
Lokeren	2016–17	Belgian Pro League	21	0	2	0	—		—		23	0
Lokeren	Total		67	1	3	0	—		—		70	1
Granada	2016–17	La Liga	17	1	—		—		—		17	1
Rostov	2017–18	Russian Premier League	28	3	2	0	—		—		30	3
Rostov	2018–19	Russian Premier League	17	2	2	0	—		—		19	2
Rostov	Total		45	5	4	0	—		—		49	5
PAOK	2018–19	Super League Greece	1	0	5	0	—		—		6	0
PAOK	2019–20	Super League Greece	28	4	6	0	0	0	—		34	4
PAOK	2020–21	Super League Greece	26	5	5	1	8	0	—		39	6
PAOK	2021–22	Super League Greece	20	2	7	0	6	0	—		33	2
PAOK	2022–23	Super League Greece	30	3	4	0	2	0	—		36	3
PAOK	Total		105	14	27	1	16	0	0	0	148	15
PAOK B	2021–22	Super League Greece 2	3	1	0	0	—		—		3	1
Midtjylland	2023–24	Danish Superliga	24	2	2	0	4	0	—		30	2
Panathinaikos	2024–25	Super League Greece	27	1	2	0	14	0	—		43	1
Career total			363	30	72	7	40	0	0	0	460	37

=== International ===
As of match played 28 March 2026

Appearances and goals by national team and year
National team	Year	Apps	Goals
Iceland	2014	1	0
Iceland	2015	2	0
Iceland	2016	6	3
Iceland	2017	7	0
Iceland	2018	10	0
Iceland	2019	3	0
Iceland	2020	7	0
Iceland	2021	3	0
Iceland	2022	1	0
Iceland	2023	6	0
Iceland	2024	9	0
Iceland	2025	10	1
Iceland	2026	1	0
Total		66	4

As of match played 13 November 2025
Scores and results list Iceland's goal tally first, score column indicates score after each Sverrir goal.

List of international goals scored by Sverrir Ingi Ingason
No.	Date	Venue	Opponent	Score	Result	Competition
1	29 March 2016	Karaiskakis Stadium, Piraeus, Greece	Greece	2–2	3–2	Friendly
2	1 June 2016	Ullevaal Stadion, Oslo, Norway	Norway	1–1	2–3	Friendly
3	15 November 2016	Ta'Qali National Stadium, Ta'Qali, Malta	Malta	2–0	2–0	Friendly
4	13 November 2025	Neftçi Arena, Baku, Azerbaijan	Azerbaijan	2–0	2–0	2026 FIFA World Cup qualification

== Honours ==
Breiðablik

- Icelandic League Cup: 2013

PAOK

- Super League Greece: 2018–19
- Greek Cup: 2018–19, 2020–21

Midtjylland

- Danish Superliga: 2023–24

Iceland

- Baltic Cup: 2022

Individual

- Super League Greece Team of the Season: 2020–21
