= Uldal =

Uldal is a surname. Notable people with the surname include:

- Hans Olav Uldal (born 1982), Norwegian track and field athlete
- Julian Veen Uldal (born 1997), Norwegian footballer
- Martin Uldal (born 2001), Norwegian biathlete
