= Yann-Erik de Lanlay =

Norwegian footballer (born 1992)

Personal information
- Full name: Yann-Erik Randa Bahezre de Lanlay
- Date of birth: 14 May 1992 (age 34)
- Place of birth: Stavanger, Norway
- Height: 1.80 m (5 ft 11 in)
- Position: Midfielder

Youth career
- –2007: Vaulen IL
- 2007–2009: Viking

Senior career*
Years	Team	Apps	(Gls)
2010–2015	Viking	127	(13)
2015–2019	Rosenborg	71	(10)
2020–2025	Viking	105	(5)
2026	Sandnes Ulf	18	(1)

International career
2011	Norway U19	8	(3)
2011–2013	Norway U21	13	(1)
2013–2014	Norway	5	(1)
- * Club domestic league appearances and goals as of 14 November 2026

Yann-Erik Randa Bahezre de Lanlay (born 14 May 1992) is a former Norwegian professional footballer who played as a midfielder.

== Club career ==
=== Early years ===
De Lanlay was born in Norway to a French father and Norwegian mother, and is therefore eligible to play for both countries. He began playing football for Vaulen IL when he was five years old. In 2006, he was picked for Statoil's football academy, where he played with Hull's Markus Henriksen, Molde's Ruben Gabrielsen and ex-teammate Christian Landu Landu. After having great success for his team he was during the summer of 2007 picked up by Viking FK.

=== Viking ===
De Lanlay came to Viking from Vaulen as a 15-year-old. He became a part of Viking's talent programme, under the leadership of Gary Goodchild. Here he also played with his three years older Brother Even de Lanlay. He was also considered a substantial talent, but had to cut down due to a knee injury. Yann-Erik was picked for the first team squad ahead of the 2010 season and made his first team debut on 17 October 2010 against Odd Grenland. During the winter of 2011, de Lanlay began playing regularly for the first team, and he scored his first goal against Fredrikstad in a 2–0 victory.

In October 2013, de Lanlay signed a new contract with Viking, binding him to the club until the end of the 2016 season.

=== Rosenborg ===
At 17 July 2015, Rosenborg announced that they had agreed with Viking for a transfer. De Lanlay signed a four-year contract with Rosenborg.

=== Return to Viking ===
On 23 December 2019, de Lanlay returned to Viking, signing a four-year contract with the club. He left the club after the 2025 season.

=== Sandnes Ulf ===
On 26 February 2026, de Lanlay signed a one-year contract with Sandnes Ulf.

== International career ==
De Lanlay was first called up for the Norwegian national team for the friendly matches against South Africa and Zambia in January 2013, and made his debut when he replaced Erik Huseklepp as a substitute at half time in the 1–0 victory against South Africa.

== Career statistics ==
=== Club ===
As of match played 14 November 2026

Appearances and goals by club, season and competition
Club	Season	League			National Cup		Europe		Other		Total	
Club	Season	Division	Apps	Goals	Apps	Goals	Apps	Goals	Apps	Goals	Apps	Goals
Viking	2010	Eliteserien	2	0	0	0	—		—		2	0
Viking	2011	Eliteserien	30	3	4	0	—		—		34	3
Viking	2012	Eliteserien	30	3	3	1	—		—		33	4
Viking	2013	Eliteserien	23	2	2	1	—		—		25	3
Viking	2014	Eliteserien	26	2	4	3	—		—		30	5
Viking	2015	Eliteserien	16	3	2	1	—		—		18	4
Viking	Total		127	13	15	6	—		—		142	19
Rosenborg	2015	Eliteserien	12	3	3	1	7 (Note: Appearance(s) in UEFA Europa League)	0	—		22	4
Rosenborg	2016	Eliteserien	17	2	1	1	4 (Note: Appearances in UEFA Champions League)	2	—		22	5
Rosenborg	2017	Eliteserien	8	0	2	0	9 (Note: Four appearances and one goal in UEFA Champions League, five appearances in UEFA Europa League)	1	0	0	19	1
Rosenborg	2018	Eliteserien	17	3	4	0	4	0	0	0	25	3
Rosenborg	2019	Eliteserien	17	2	1	0	5	0	—		23	2
Rosenborg	Total		71	10	11	2	29	3	0	0	111	15
Viking	2020	Eliteserien	19	2	—		1	0	—		20	2
Viking	2021	Eliteserien	20	1	2	1	—		—		22	2
Viking	2022	Eliteserien	21	1	5	1	2 (Note: Appearances in UEFA Europa Conference League)	0	—		28	2
Viking	2023	Eliteserien	24	1	4	0	—		—		28	1
Viking	2024	Eliteserien	20	0	4	1	—		—		24	1
Viking	2025	Eliteserien	1	0	1	0	—		—		2	0
Viking	Total		105	5	16	3	3	0	—		124	8
Sandnes Ulf	2026	OBOS-ligaen	18	1	2	0	—		—		20	1
Career total			321	29	44	11	32	3	0	0	396	44

=== International ===
As of match played 27 August 2014

Appearances and goals by national team and year
National team	Year	Apps	Goals
Norway	2013	2	0
Norway	2014	3	1
Total		5	1

Scores and results list Norway's goal tally first.

List of international goals scored by Yann-Erik de Lanlay
#	Date	Venue	Opponent	Score	Result	Competition	Reference
1.	15 January 2014	Mohammed Bin Zayed Stadium, Abu Dhabi, United Arab Emirates	Moldova	2–1	2–1	Friendly	

== Honours ==
=== Club ===
Rosenborg

- Tippeligaen/Eliteserien (4): 2015, 2016, 2017, 2018
- Norwegian Football Cup (3): 2015, 2016, 2018

Viking

- Eliteserien: 2025
