= Veton Berisha =

Norwegian footballer (born 1994)

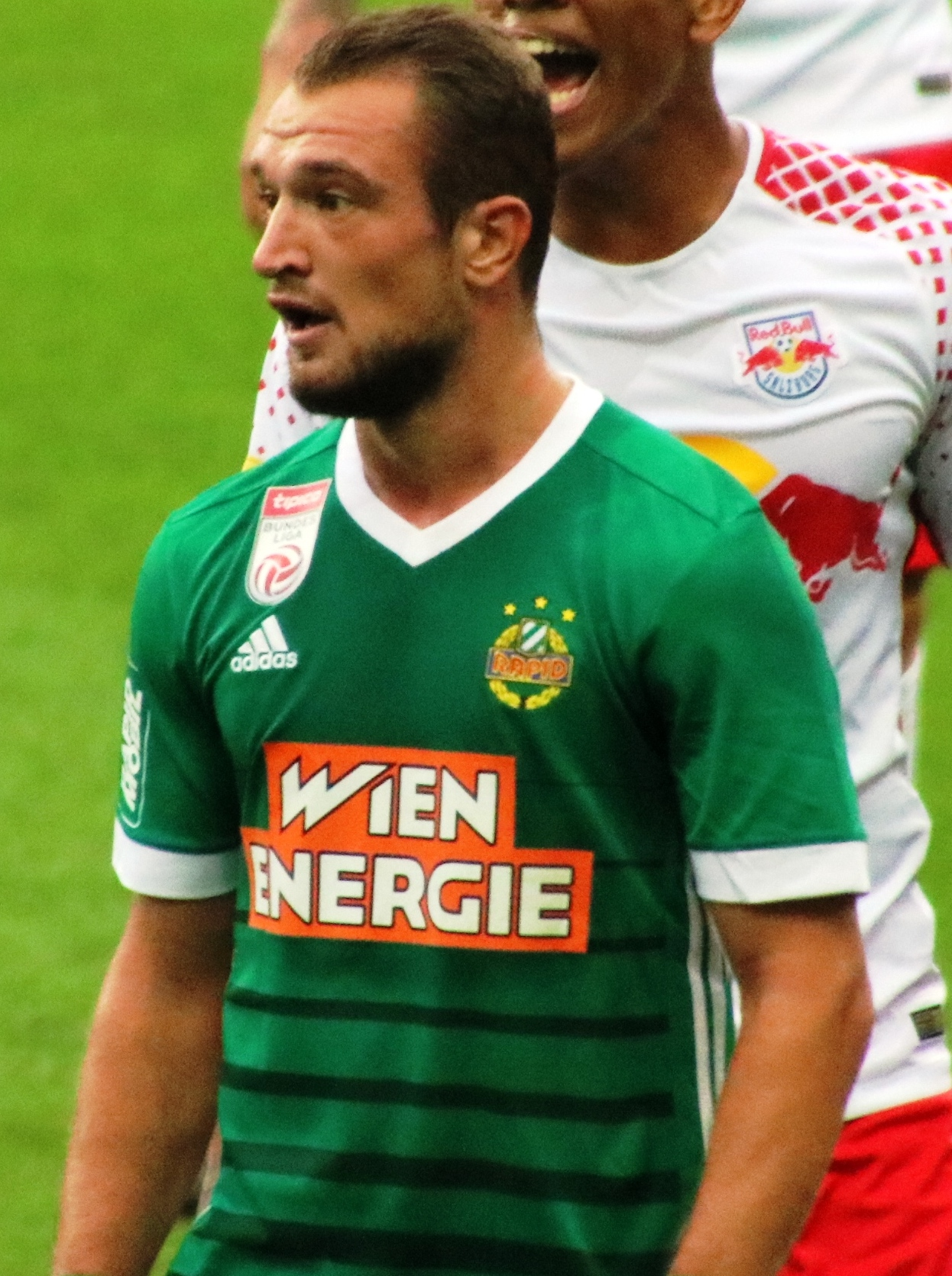
- Berisha with Rapid Wien in 2017

Personal information
- Full name: Veton Berisha
- Date of birth: 13 April 1994 (age 32)
- Place of birth: Egersund, Norway
- Height: 1.75 m (5 ft 9 in)
- Position: Forward

Team information
- Current team: Viking
- Number: 14

Youth career
- –2009: Egersund

Senior career*
Years	Team	Apps	(Gls)
2009–2010	Egersund	21	(1)
2010–2015	Viking	94	(24)
2015–2017	Greuther Fürth	63	(11)
2017–2019	Rapid Wien	44	(7)
2019	Brann	26	(3)
2020–2022	Viking	68	(46)
2022–2023	Hammarby IF	14	(4)
2023–2025	Molde	32	(9)
2025–	Viking	6	(2)

International career^{‡}
2009	Norway U15	1	(0)
2010	Norway U16	9	(3)
2011	Norway U17	9	(3)
2011–2012	Norway U18	14	(8)
2013	Norway U19	2	(1)
2013–2016	Norway U21	17	(2)
2016–2022	Norway	10	(1)
- * Club domestic league appearances and goals as of 10 May 2026 ‡ National team caps and goals as of 12 June 2022

Veton Berisha (born 13 April 1994) is a Norwegian professional footballer who plays as a forward for Viking. His parents are from Kosovo and he is the younger brother of Valon Berisha. Berisha has represented Norway at every level from under-15 to full international level.

== Club career ==
Berisha was born in Egersund, and started his career in the local club Egersunds IK. He was considered one of the biggest Norwegian talents at his age and, like his brother Valon, Veton was on a trial with Manchester City before he signed for Viking in May 2009, but did not join the club until the summer of 2010. He made his debut for Egersunds' first-team in 2009 against Hundvåg, and in total he played 21 matches for the Third Division side.

After joining Viking, Berisha trained with the first team in the pre-season ahead of the 2011 season, and made his debut for the club when he replaced Erik Nevland after 60 minutes in the first round of the 2011 Norwegian Cup against his old club Egersund. Berisha got his first minutes of playing-time in Tippeligaen in the 1–3 loss against Tromsø on 19 May 2011, and started his first match for Viking when Brann was beaten 3–0 on 17 June 2011.

On 19 June 2011, Berisha and his brother Valon became the first brothers to start a match for Viking in 22 years since Jan and Egil Fjetland played against Molde in the 1989 Norwegian Cup final. After the match, Viking's manager Åge Hareide said that "It's fun to start the game with two brothers, I only wish they could pass the ball to others than themselves, as it would create a lot more chances for us, but since they are brothers I guess we can forgive them. In the match against Aalesund on 17 July 2011, Berisha got his first league-goal when he scored the match-winning goal 12 minutes after he came on as a substitute to replace Erik Nevland.

During the mid-summer break in the 2012 season, Berisha expressed a concern about his lack of playing time; he had only played 69 minutes in the league that season and his last appearance in Viking's starting line-up was on 7 August 2011. But Berisha was hoping for a fresh start after Kjell Jonevret was hired as the new head coach following Hareide's departure. In the fourth round of the 2012 Norwegian Cup, Berisha scored Viking's first goal after only one minute on the pitch, but Brann eventually won 3–2.

On 15 July 2012, Berisha secured Jonevret his first victory as Viking-coach, when he scored the match-winning goal in the stoppage-time against Hønefoss.

On 22 April 2013, it was reported that Berisha fractured his right elbow and would be absent for two months.

After scoring 11 goals in 14 matches halfway through the 2015 season, Berisha joined 2. Bundesliga side Greuther Fürth on a free transfer on 1 July 2015. On 1 September 2017, he signed a three-year contract with Austrian club Rapid Wien.

On 30 March 2019, he returned to Norwegian football, signing a four-year contract with Brann. In January 2020, Berisha joined his former club Viking for a reported fee of around NOK 6.5 million. He signed a four-year contract with the club.

On 23 July 2022, Berisha transferred to Hammarby IF in the Swedish Allsvenskan, signing a four-and-a-half-year deal. The transfer fee was reportedly set at around 20 million Norwegian kroner, making it a record breaking transfer for Hammarby. In total, Berisha made 15 competitive appearances for Hammarby, scoring four goals, helping the side to reach a 3rd place in the 2022 Allsvenskan table.

On 24 January 2023, Molde announced the signing of Berisha to a four-year contract. He was sought out as a replacement for David Datro Fofana and the transfer fee was reportedly set at around 35-40 million Swedish kronor, with potential bonuses included.

On 1 August 2025, Molde announced that Berisha would leave the club immediately after a mutual agreement between the player and club to terminate his contract.

On 5 August 2025, Viking announced the signing of Berisha on a contract throughout the 2027 season. He made five appearances and scored two goals as Viking won the 2025 Eliteserien.

== International career ==
Having played one match for Norway U15 in 2009, Berisha played nine matches for Norway U16 the next year where he scored three goals. In 2011, Berisha also scored three goals in nine matches while representing his country, this time for the under-17 team. He made 14 appearances and scored eight goals for Norway U18 before representing the under-19 team twice in 2013, scoring one goal. Between 2013 and 2016, Berisha played 17 matches and scored two goals for the under-21 team.

On 29 May 2016, Berisha debuted for the Norwegian senior squad in a friendly match against Portugal. He scored his first goal for Norway on 5 June 2016 against Belgium.

Like his brother Valon, he was approached by Kosovo when the country became FIFA members in May 2016. Veton Berisha decided to keep representing Norway.

== Career statistics ==
=== Club ===
As of match played 10 May 2026

Appearances and goals by club, season and competition
Club	Season	League			National cup (Note: Includes Norwegian Cup, DFB Pokal, Austrian Cup, Svenska Cupen)		Europe		Total	
Club	Season	Division	Apps	Goals	Apps	Goals	Apps	Goals	Apps	Goals
Viking	2011	Eliteserien	12	1	4	0	—		16	1
Viking	2012	Eliteserien	21	7	3	1	—		24	8
Viking	2013	Eliteserien	22	4	1	0	—		23	4
Viking	2014	Eliteserien	25	1	4	2	—		29	3
Viking	2015	Eliteserien	14	11	2	1	—		16	12
Viking	Total		94	24	14	4	—		108	28
Greuther Fürth	2015–16	2. Bundesliga	33	8	1	0	—		34	8
Greuther Fürth	2016–17	2. Bundesliga	26	3	2	1	—		28	4
Greuther Fürth	2017–18	2. Bundesliga	4	0	1	0	—		5	0
Greuther Fürth	Total		63	11	4	1	—		67	12
Rapid Wien	2017–18	Austrian Bundesliga	27	4	2	0	—		29	4
Rapid Wien	2018–19	Austrian Bundesliga	17	3	2	1	10 (Note: Appearance(s) in UEFA Europa League)	1	29	5
Rapid Wien	Total		44	7	4	1	10	1	58	9
Brann	2019	Eliteserien	26	3	3	0	2	1	31	4
Viking	2020	Eliteserien	28	16	—		1	0	29	16
Viking	2021	Eliteserien	28	22	3	2	—		31	24
Viking	2022	Eliteserien	12	8	3	3	—		15	11
Viking	Total		68	46	6	5	1	0	75	51
Hammarby IF	2022	Allsvenskan	14	4	1	0	—		15	4
Molde	2023	Eliteserien	22	5	7	2	9 (Note: Four appearances in UEFA Champions League, five appearances in UEFA Europa League)	0	38	7
Molde	2024	Eliteserien	1	0	0	0	4 (Note: Appearances in UEFA Conference League)	0	5	0
Molde	2025	Eliteserien	9	4	3	3	—		12	7
Molde	Total		32	9	10	5	13	0	55	14
Viking	2025	Eliteserien	5	2	0	0	2	0	7	2
Viking	2026	Eliteserien	1	0	0	0	—		1	0
Viking	Total		6	2	0	0	2	0	8	2
Career total			347	106	42	16	28	2	417	124

=== International ===
As of match played 12 June 2022

Appearances and goals by national team and year
National team	Year	Apps	Goals
Norway	2016	4	1
Norway	2017	0	0
Norway	2018	0	0
Norway	2019	0	0
Norway	2020	1	0
Norway	2021	2	0
Norway	2022	3	0
Total		10	1

Scores and results list Norway's goal tally first, score column indicates score after each Berisha goal.

List of international goals scored by Veton Berisha
No.	Date	Venue	Opponent	Score	Result	Competition
1	5 June 2016	King Baudouin Stadium, Brussels, Belgium	Belgium	2–1	2–3	Friendly

== Honours ==
Molde

- Norwegian Cup: 2023

Viking

- Eliteserien: 2025

Individual

- Eliteserien Player of the Month: May 2022
