= Arild Østbø =

Norwegian footballer (born 1991)

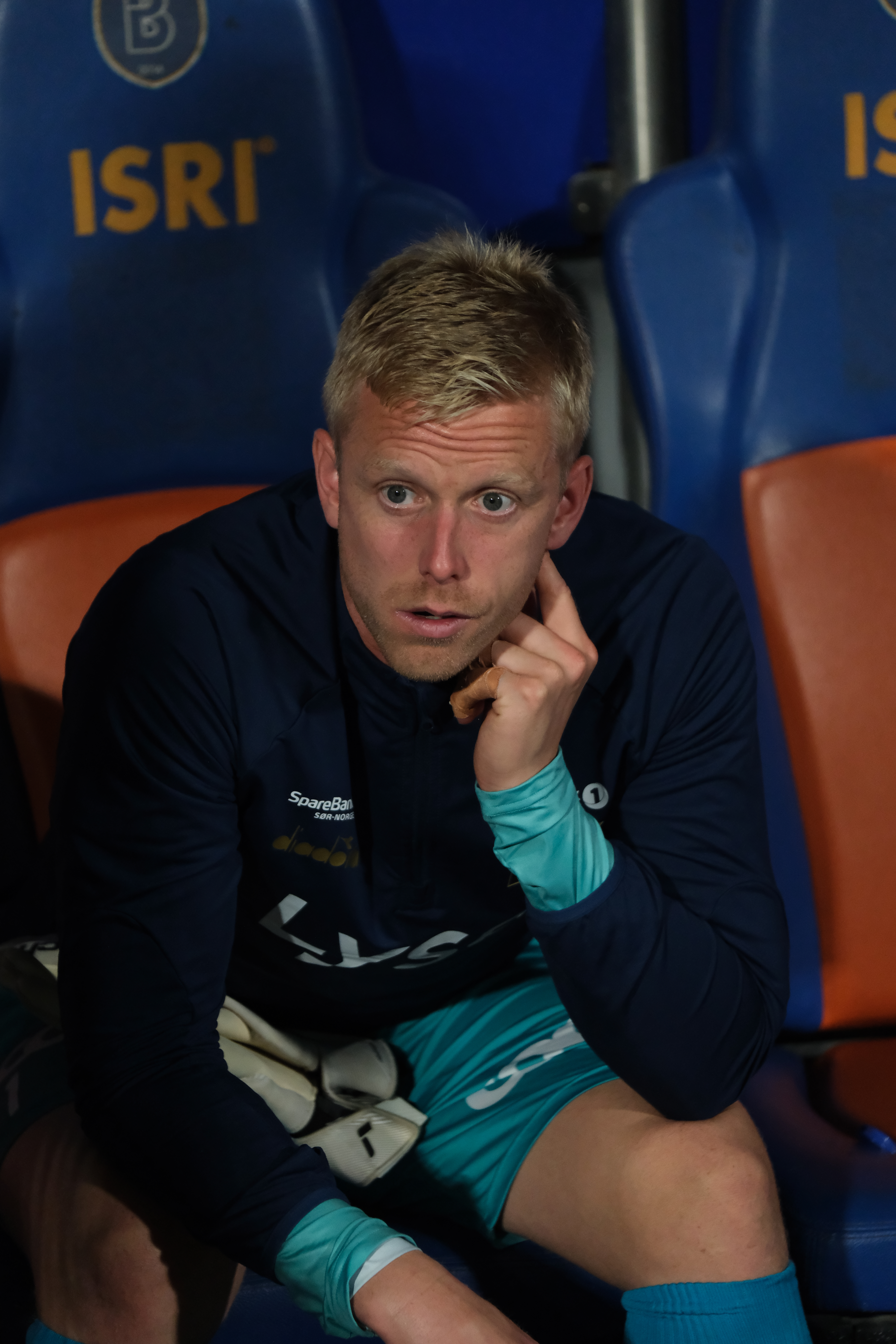
- Østbø with Viking in 2025

Personal information
- Full name: Arild Østbø
- Date of birth: 19 April 1991 (age 35)
- Place of birth: Stavanger, Norway
- Height: 1.83 m (6 ft 0 in)
- Position: Goalkeeper

Team information
- Current team: Viking
- Number: 1

Youth career
- –2003: Buøy
- 2003–2010: Viking

Senior career*
Years	Team	Apps	(Gls)
2008–2015	Viking	24	(0)
2009–2010	→ Sandnes Ulf (loan)		
2012	→ Start (loan)	7	(0)
2013	→ Strømmen (loan)	20	(0)
2016	Sarpsborg 08	13	(0)
2017–2019	Rosenborg	10	(0)
2020–	Viking	60	(0)

International career
2006	Norway U15	2	(0)
2007	Norway U16	10	(0)
2008	Norway U17	5	(0)
2009	Norway U18	4	(0)
2010	Norway U19	6	(0)
2010–2013	Norway U21	18	(0)
2013–2014	Norway U23	4	(0)
- * Club domestic league appearances and goals as of 17 October 2026

Arild Østbø (born 19 April 1991) is a Norwegian footballer who plays as a goalkeeper for Viking.

== Career ==
Østbø was born in Stavanger and joined the senior team of Viking FK in 2008. He formerly played for Buøy IL. He made his Viking debut in the 2008 Norwegian Football Cup, but his Tippeligaen debut came in 2010.

From 2009 to 2010 he was on loan in Sandnes Ulf; the deal was terminated after Sandnes Ulf got Bo Andersen as their first-choice goalkeeper.

Following Alexander Lund Hansen's transfer from Start to Rosenborg, Østbø was on 9 August 2012 loaned out to Start for the rest of the 2012-season.

Ahead of the 2013 season, Viking's first-choice goalkeeper Rune Jarstein wanted to leave the club to play abroad. When the international transfer window closed on 1 February 2013, Jarstein was however still a Viking-player, and Viking wanted to loan out Østbø instead. Østbø joined the First Division side Strømmen on a season-long loan-deal in February 2013, where Viking had an option to recall Østbø if Jarstein were sold in the summer. After his loan deal ended, he was poised to return to Viking as the successor of Jarstein.

On 2 November 2015, he signed a two-year contract with Sarpsborg 08. After one season in Sarpsborg, Østbø signed a three-year contract with Rosenborg in January 2017.

On 24 September 2019, Viking announced that Østbø would return to the club, signing a three-year contract ahead of the 2020 season. He made 12 appearances as Viking won the 2025 Eliteserien.

== Career statistics ==
=== Club ===
As of match played 17 October 2026

Appearances and goals by club, season and competition
Club	Season	League			National Cup		Europe		Other		Total	
Club	Season	Division	Apps	Goals	Apps	Goals	Apps	Goals	Apps	Goals	Apps	Goals
Viking	2008	Eliteserien	0	0	1	0	—		—		1	0
Viking	2009	Eliteserien	0	0	0	0	—		—		0	0
Viking	2010	Eliteserien	5	0	0	0	—		—		5	0
Viking	2011	Eliteserien	0	0	1	0	—		—		1	0
Viking	2012	Eliteserien	0	0	1	0	—		—		1	0
Viking	2013	Eliteserien	0	0	0	0	—		—		0	0
Viking	2014	Eliteserien	18	0	2	0	—		—		20	0
Viking	2015	Eliteserien	1	0	3	0	—		—		4	0
Viking	Total		24	0	8	0	—		—		32	0
Start (loan)	2012	1. divisjon	7	0	0	0	—		—		7	0
Strømmen (loan)	2013	1. divisjon	20	0	0	0	—		—		20	0
Sarpsborg 08	2016	Eliteserien	13	0	4	0	—		—		17	0
Rosenborg	2017	Eliteserien	6	0	5	0	0	0	0 (Note: Appearance(s) in Mesterfinalen.)	0	11	0
Rosenborg	2018	Eliteserien	3	0	4	0	0	0	1	0	8	0
Rosenborg	2019	Eliteserien	1	0	3	0	1 (Note: Appearance in UEFA Europa League)	0	—		5	0
Rosenborg	Total		10	0	12	0	1	0	1	0	24	0
Viking	2020	Eliteserien	13	0	—		0	0	—		13	0
Viking	2021	Eliteserien	14	0	3	0	—		—		17	0
Viking	2022	Eliteserien	2	0	2	0	0	0	—		4	0
Viking	2023	Eliteserien	0	0	4	0	—		—		4	0
Viking	2024	Eliteserien	7	0	4	0	—		—		11	0
Viking	2025	Eliteserien	12	0	3	0	1 (Note: Appearance in UEFA Conference League)	0	—		16	0
Viking	2026	Eliteserien	12	0	0	0	4 (Note: Appearance in UEFA Champions League)	0	—		16	0
Viking	Total		60	0	16	0	5	0	—		81	0
Career total			134	0	40	0	6	0	1	0	181	0

== Honours ==
Viking

- Eliteserien: 2025
