= Iven Austbø =

Norwegian footballer (born 1985)

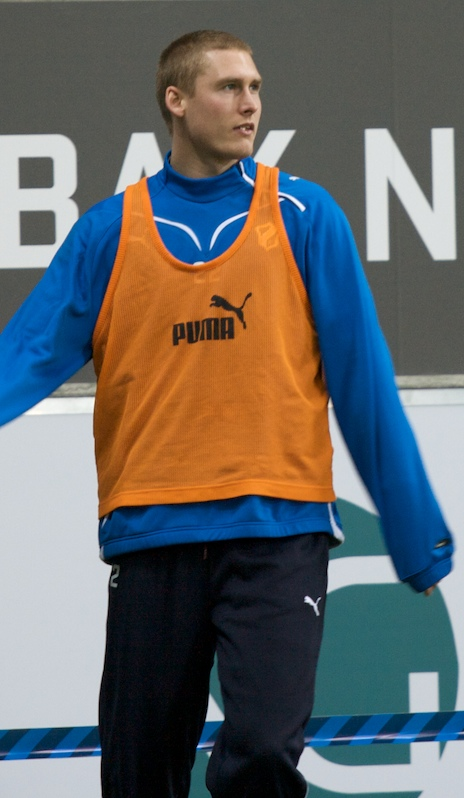
- Austbø in 2009

Personal information
- Date of birth: 22 February 1985 (age 41)
- Place of birth: Stavanger, Norway
- Height: 1.90 m (6 ft 3 in)
- Position: Goalkeeper

Youth career
- –2002: Randaberg
- 2002–2004: Viking

Senior career*
Years	Team	Apps	(Gls)
2004–2007	Viking	27	(0)
2008–2010	Stabæk	4	(0)
2011–2013	Sandefjord	88	(0)
2014–2021	Viking	171	(0)

International career
2001	Norway U16	5	(0)
2002	Norway U17	3	(0)
2003	Norway U18	8	(0)
2003–2004	Norway U19	9	(0)
2004–2006	Norway U21	9	(0)
- * Club domestic league appearances and goals

Iven Austbø (born 22 February 1985) is a Norwegian former professional footballer who played as a goalkeeper.

== Career ==
Austbø began his senior career in Viking, where he got his debut on the top level in Norway in 2004. Austbø became Viking's first choice goalkeeper after Anthony Basso left the club in 2006, and remained the first choice for the rest of the season. When Viking brought Thomas Myhre home from Charlton in 2007, Austbø was put back on the bench. Wanting to play first team football, Austbø signed for Stabæk in 2008, but again found himself to be the second choice behind Jon Knudsen. He was sold to Sandefjord in 2011, where he was the club's first choice goalkeeper in Adeccoligaen for three seasons. After the 2013 season, he again signed with Viking, where he stayed until retiring after the 2021 season.

== Career statistics ==
=== Club ===
Appearances and goals by club, season and competition
Club	Season	League			National Cup		Continental		Other		Total	
Club	Season	Division	Apps	Goals	Apps	Goals	Apps	Goals	Apps	Goals	Apps	Goals
Viking	2004	Eliteserien	2	0	0	0	—		—		2	0
Viking	2005	Eliteserien	3	0	2	0	1 (Note: Appearance(s) in UEFA Europa League)	0	—		6	0
Viking	2006	Eliteserien	5	0	4	0	—		—		9	0
Viking	2007	Eliteserien	17	0	4	0	—		—		21	0
Viking	Total		27	0	10	0	1	0	—		38	0
Stabæk	2008	Eliteserien	2	0	3	0	—		—		5	0
Stabæk	2009	Eliteserien	0	0	2	0	1	0	—		3	0
Stabæk	2010	Eliteserien	2	0	0	0	1	0	—		3	0
Stabæk	Total		4	0	5	0	2	0	—		11	0
Sandefjord	2011	1. divisjon	30	0	1	0	—		—		31	0
Sandefjord	2012	1. divisjon	29	0	3	0	—		1 (Note: Appearance in promotion play-offs.)	0	33	0
Sandefjord	2013	1. divisjon	29	0	2	0	—		—		31	0
Sandefjord	Total		88	0	6	0	—		1	0	95	0
Viking	2014	Eliteserien	13	0	3	0	—		—		16	0
Viking	2015	Eliteserien	30	0	3	0	—		—		33	0
Viking	2016	Eliteserien	30	0	0	0	—		—		30	0
Viking	2017	Eliteserien	24	0	0	0	—		—		24	0
Viking	2018	1. divisjon	18	0	0	0	—		—		18	0
Viking	2019	Eliteserien	29	0	6	0	—		—		35	0
Viking	2020	Eliteserien	17	0	—		1	0	—		18	0
Viking	2021	Eliteserien	10	0	0	0	—		—		10	0
Viking	Total		171	0	12	0	1	0	—		184	0
Career total			290	0	33	0	4	0	1	0	328	0

== Honours ==
Viking

- Norwegian First Division: 2018
- Norwegian Football Cup: 2019
