= Rasmus Martinsen =

Norwegian footballer (born 1996)

Personal information
- Full name: Rasmus Levin Martinsen
- Date of birth: 14 April 1996 (age 30)
- Place of birth: Stavanger, Norway
- Height: 1.77 m (5 ft 9 1/2 in)
- Position: Right back

Team information
- Current team: Hinna

Senior career*
Years	Team	Apps	(Gls)
2014–2018	Viking	27	(1)
2019	Brodd	12	(5)
2019–	Hinna	13	(6)

International career
2012	Norway U-16	10	(0)
2012–2013	Norway U-17	11	(0)
2014	Norway U-18	3	(0)
2014–2015	Norway U-19	5	(0)
- * Club domestic league appearances and goals as of 21:43, 23 December 2019 (UTC)

Rasmus Levin Martinsen (born 14 April 1996) is a Norwegian footballer who plays as a right-back for Hinna Fotball.

== Career ==
He made his league debut as a substitute against Odd in September 2014.

After the 2018 season, Viking did not renew Martinsen's contract and thus he left the club. On 6 April 2019, Martinsen signed for 3. divisjon club IL Brodd.

== Career statistics ==
As of 16 November 2018

Season	Club	Division	League		Cup		Total	
Season	Club	Division	Apps	Goals	Apps	Goals	Apps	Goals
2014	Viking	Eliteserien	1	0	2	0	3	0
2015	Viking	Eliteserien	1	0	0	0	1	0
2016	Viking	Eliteserien	1	0	1	0	2	0
2017	Viking	Eliteserien	15	1	2	0	17	1
2018	Viking	1. divisjon	9	0	1	0	10	0
Career Total			27	1	6	0	33	1
