= Björn Daníel Sverrisson =

Icelandic footballer (born 1990)

Personal information
- Full name: Björn Daníel Sverrisson
- Date of birth: 29 May 1990 (age 36)
- Place of birth: Hafnarfjörður, Iceland
- Height: 1.82 m (6 ft 0 in)
- Position: Midfielder

Youth career
- –2007: FH

Senior career*
| Years | Team | Apps | (Gls) |
| 2008–2013 | FH | 108 | (32) |
| 2014–2016 | Viking | 57 | (11) |
| 2016–2018 | AGF | 36 | (3) |
| 2017 | → Vejle BK (loan) | 9 | (0) |
| 2019–2025 | FH | 154 | (25) |
| Total | | 364 | (71) |

International career
| 2008 | Iceland U19 | 4 | (0) |
| 2009–2012 | Iceland U21 | 9 | (0) |
| 2014–2017 | Iceland | 8 | (0) |
- * Club domestic league appearances and goals

Björn Daníel Sverrisson is a former Icelandic footballer who played as a midfielder and a musician.

== Career ==
Björn has played club football in Iceland and Norway for FH and Viking FK.

Björn signed with Danish club AGF in 2018, but at the end of his contract which was at the end of the year, he left again.

He made his international debut for Iceland in 2014.

After the 2025-season, Björn announced that he will retire from football.

== Career statistics ==
As of match played 1 January 2026

| Club | Season | Division | League | | Cup | | Europe | | Other | | Total | |
| Club | Season | Division | Apps | Goals | Apps | Goals | Apps | Goals | Apps | Goals | Apps | Goals |
|---|---|---|---|---|---|---|---|---|---|---|---|---|
| FH | 2008 | Úrvalsdeild | 11 | 0 | 7 | 1 | 3 | 1 | — | | 21 | 2 |
| FH | 2009 | Úrvalsdeild | 17 | 4 | 8 | 3 | 2 | 0 | — | | 27 | 7 |
| FH | 2010 | Úrvalsdeild | 19 | 6 | 13 | 2 | 2 | 0 | — | | 34 | 8 |
| FH | 2011 | Úrvalsdeild | 19 | 4 | 9 | 0 | 2 | 0 | — | | 30 | 4 |
| FH | 2012 | Úrvalsdeild | 21 | 9 | 9 | 3 | 4 | 0 | — | | 34 | 12 |
| FH | 2013 | Úrvalsdeild | 21 | 9 | 9 | 1 | 6 | 2 | — | | 36 | 12 |
| FH | Total | | 108 | 32 | 55 | 10 | 19 | 3 | — | | 182 | 45 |
| Viking | 2014 | Tippeligaen | 29 | 6 | 5 | 3 | — | | — | | 34 | 9 |
| Viking | 2015 | Tippeligaen | 8 | 1 | 0 | 0 | — | | — | | 8 | 1 |
| Viking | 2016 | Tippeligaen | 20 | 4 | 1 | 0 | — | | — | | 21 | 4 |
| Viking | Total | | 57 | 11 | 6 | 3 | — | | — | | 63 | 14 |
| AGF | 2016–17 | Danish Superliga | 24 | 3 | 2 | 0 | — | | 3 (Note: Appearances in relegation play-offs.) | 1 | 29 | 4 |
| AGF | 2017–18 | Danish Superliga | 5 | 0 | 0 | 0 | — | | — | | 5 | 0 |
| AGF | 2018–19 | Danish Superliga | 7 | 0 | 1 | 0 | — | | — | | 8 | 0 |
| AGF | Total | | 36 | 3 | 3 | 0 | — | | 3 | 1 | 42 | 4 |
| Vejle (loan) | 2017–18 | Danish 1st Division | 9 | 0 | 0 | 0 | — | | — | | 9 | 0 |
| FH | 2019 | Úrvalsdeild | 22 | 3 | 5 | 0 | — | | — | | 27 | 3 |
| FH | 2020 | Úrvalsdeild | 17 | 2 | 3 | 0 | 1 | 0 | — | | 21 | 2 |
| FH | 2021 | Úrvalsdeild | 19 | 0 | 1 | 0 | 4 | 0 | — | | 24 | 0 |
| FH | 2022 | Úrvalsdeild | 27 | 0 | 5 | 3 | 0 | 0 | — | | 32 | 3 |
| FH | 2023 | Úrvalsdeild | 19 | 4 | 1 | 0 | 0 | 0 | — | | 20 | 4 |
| FH | 2024 | Úrvalsdeild | 24 | 8 | 1 | 0 | 0 | 0 | — | | 25 | 8 |
| FH | 2025 | Úrvalsdeild | 26 | 8 | 1 | 0 | 0 | 0 | — | | 27 | 8 |
| FH | Total | | 154 | 25 | 8 | 0 | 1 | 0 | — | | 163 | 25 |
| Career total | | | 364 | 51 | 81 | 16 | 24 | 3 | 3 | 1 | 472 | 71 |
