= Steinþór Freyr Þorsteinsson =

Icelandic footballer

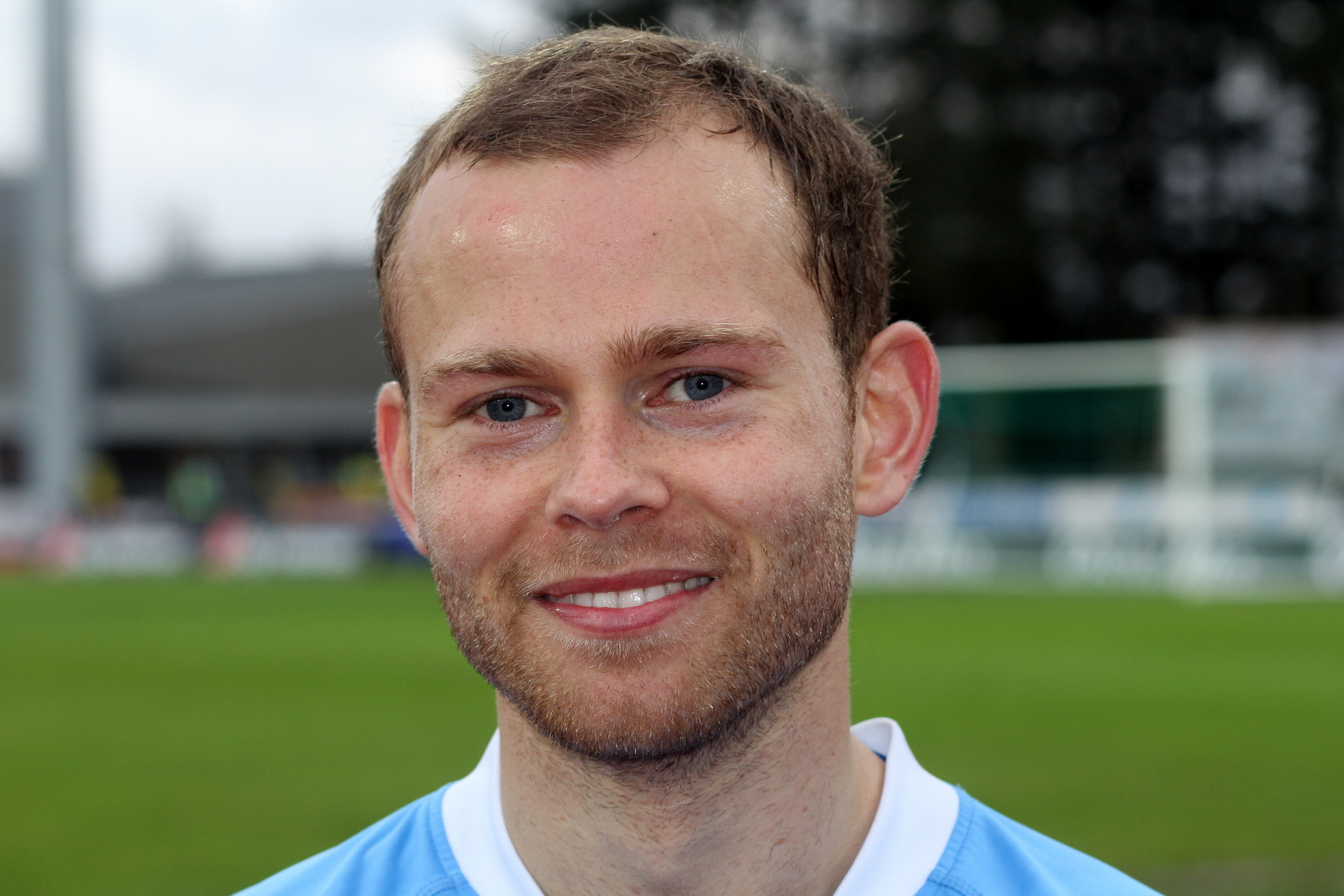

Personal information
- Full name: Steinþór Freyr Þorsteinsson
- Date of birth: 29 July 1985 (age 41)
- Place of birth: Kópavogur, Iceland
- Height: 1.71 m (5 ft 7 1/2 in)
- Position: Midfielder

Team information
- Current team: Dalvík/Reynir

Senior career*
Years	Team	Apps	(Gls)
2002–2008	Breiðablik	91	(3)
2009–2010	Stjarnan	26	(6)
2010	Örgryte IS	9	(2)
2011–2013	Sandnes Ulf	82	(13)
2014–2016	Viking	49	(5)
2016	→ Sandnes Ulf (loan)	22	(1)
2017–2023	KA	88	(4)
2024–2026	Völsungur	51	(4)
2026–	Dalvík/Reynir	7	(0)

International career
2001–2002	Iceland U-17	8	(2)
2003	Iceland U-19	5	(0)
2009–2014	Iceland	8	(0)
- * Club domestic league appearances and goals as of 22 July 2026

Steinþór Freyr Þorsteinsson (born 29 July 1985) is an Icelandic footballer who currently plays for Dalvík/Reynir. He is known for his outstanding athleticism and long throw-ins. He was voted the best player of the first seven rounds of the Icelandic deild in both 2009 and 2010.

On 31 July 2010 he signed a 2 1/2-year contract with Örgryte IS, but was released when the club went bankrupt in early February 2011. In March 2011 he signed a one-year contract with Norwegian club Sandnes Ulf. At Sandnes Ulf, Steinþór showed an amazing skill to win penalties and free kicks. In his first 9 games for the team, he had already won 6 penalties for the team.

== International career ==
Steinþór played his first senior national team game for Iceland in November 2009 against Iran. His 8th and final international was a January 2014 friendly match against Sweden.

== Career statistics ==
As of 15 April 2021

Club	Season	Division	League		Cup		Total	
Club	Season	Division	Apps	Goals	Apps	Goals	Apps	Goals
Breiðablik	2002	1.deild	11	1	1	0	12	1
Breiðablik	2003	1.deild	8	0	1	0	9	0
Breiðablik	2004	1.deild	16	1	2	1	18	2
Breiðablik	2005	1.deild	17	0	2	0	19	0
Breiðablik	2006	Úrvalsdeild	15	0	1	0	16	0
Breiðablik	2007	Úrvalsdeild	10	1	1	0	11	1
Breiðablik	2008	Úrvalsdeild	14	0	2	0	16	0
Breiðablik	Total		91	3	10	1	101	4
Stjarnan	2009	Úrvalsdeild	14	3	1	0	15	3
Stjarnan	2010	Úrvalsdeild	12	3	2	1	14	4
Stjarnan	Total		26	6	3	1	29	7
Örgryte IS	2010	Superettan	9	2	0	0	9	2
Sandnes Ulf	2011	Adeccoligaen	25	2	2	1	27	3
Sandnes Ulf	2012	Tippeligaen	29	6	1	0	30	6
Sandnes Ulf	2013	Tippeligaen	28	5	2	1	30	6
Sandnes Ulf	Total		82	13	5	2	87	15
Viking	2014	Tippeligaen	29	4	4	2	33	6
Viking	2015	Tippeligaen	20	1	6	2	26	3
Viking	Total		49	5	10	4	59	9
Sandnes Ulf (loan)	2016	OBOS-ligaen	22	1	2	0	24	1
KA	2017	Úrvalsdeild	17	0	0	0	17	0
KA	2018	Úrvalsdeild	14	1	1	0	15	1
KA	2019	Úrvalsdeild	10	0	1	0	11	0
KA	2020	Úrvalsdeild	15	3	2	1	17	4
KA	2021	Úrvalsdeild	15	0	1	0	16	0
KA	2022	Úrvalsdeild	17	0	3	0	20	0
KA	2023	Úrvalsdeild	0	0	0	0	0	0
KA	Total		88	4	8	1	96	5
Career Total			367	34	38	9	405	43
