= Christian Landu Landu =

Norwegian footballer (born 1992)

Christian Landu-Landu
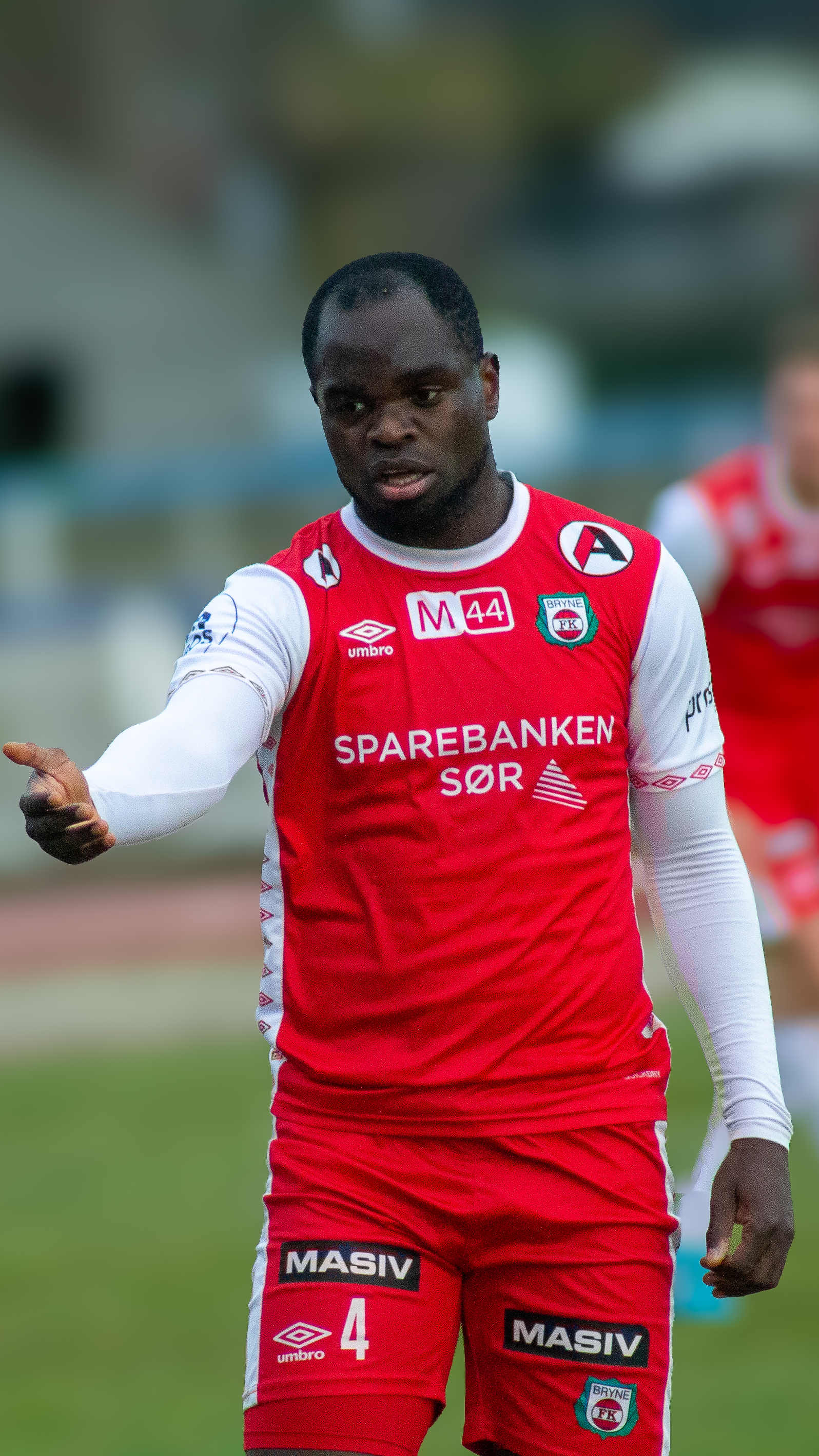

Personal information
- Full name: Christian Tamba Landu Landu
- Date of birth: 25 January 1992 (age 34)
- Place of birth: Stavanger, Norway
- Height: 1.83 m (6 ft 0 in)
- Positions: Defender; midfielder

Youth career
- –2005: Tasta
- 2005–2008: Viking

Senior career*
Years	Team	Apps	(Gls)
2008–2015	Viking	93	(2)
2015–2018	Tromsø	84	(1)
2019–2022	Sandnes Ulf	94	(3)
2023–2026	Bryne	71	(4)

International career^{‡}
2007	Norway U15	2	(1)
2007–2008	Norway U16	9	(0)
2008	Norway U17	8	(0)
2009–2010	Norway U18	6	(1)
2010–2011	Norway U19	6	(0)
2012	Norway U20	2	(0)
2013	Norway U21	6	(0)
- * Club domestic league appearances and goals as of 1 December 2025 ‡ National team caps and goals as of 27 March 2024

Christian Landu Landu (born 25 January 1992) is a Norwegian footballer currently free agent.

== Club career ==
=== Viking ===
Landu Landu was born in Stavanger and started his career in local club Tasta, before he joined Viking in 2005. He trained with the Viking first-team for the first time in 2006, and later, while still a youth player, began training with the first team every day. Egil Østenstad described him as a talented player.

He made his debut for the Viking first team as substitute in a Norwegian Premier League match on 3 August 2008, and started his first full-game against Sandefjord in Sandefjord. In the 2009 season he made 4 appearances for the first team, with another 12 following in the 2010 season. In November 2009 the player's agent claimed he was on trial at Liverpool.

=== Bryne ===
After his contract with Sandnes Ulf expired, Landu Landu signed a two-year contract with Bryne, starting from the 2023 season.

== International career ==
Landu Landu is of Congolese descent, but has represented Norway at youth international level.

He has been capped at all levels from U15 to U21 by Norway.

== Personal life ==
He was born in Stavanger to parents of Congolese ancestry. His father played football in his home country, but never at top level. He was at a young age brought to football by friends. He started his career as a goalkeeper, but thought that was boring after a while. He said that he suited best to an outfield role in an interview in 2009.

== Career statistics ==
As of 24 August 2025

Club	Season	League			National cup		Other		Total	
Club	Season	Division	Apps	Goals	Apps	Goals	Apps	Goals	Apps	Goals
Viking	2008	Tippeligaen	1	0	1	0	—		2	0
Viking	2009	Tippeligaen	4	0	1	0	—		5	0
Viking	2010	Tippeligaen	17	0	1	0	—		18	0
Viking	2011	Tippeligaen	17	0	4	0	—		21	0
Viking	2012	Tippeligaen	13	1	3	0	—		16	1
Viking	2013	Tippeligaen	24	0	3	0	—		27	0
Viking	2014	Tippeligaen	17	1	4	1	—		21	2
Viking	Total		93	2	17	1	—		110	3
Tromsø	2015	Tippeligaen	20	0	0	0	—		20	0
Tromsø	2016	Tippeligaen	28	0	4	0	—		32	0
Tromsø	2017	Eliteserien	24	1	2	0	—		26	1
Tromsø	2018	Eliteserien	12	0	4	1	—		16	1
Tromsø	Total		84	1	10	1	—		94	2
Sandnes Ulf	2019	1. divisjon	24	1	1	0	—		25	1
Sandnes Ulf	2020	1. divisjon	25	1	0	0	—		25	1
Sandnes Ulf	2021	1. divisjon	23	1	2	0	—		25	1
Sandnes Ulf	2022	1. divisjon	22	0	3	0	1 (Note: Appearances in Eliteserien play-offs)	0	26	0
Sandnes Ulf	Total		94	3	6	0	1	0	101	3
Bryne	2023	1. divisjon	25	3	2	0	1	0	28	3
Bryne	2024	1. divisjon	27	1	3	0	—		30	1
Bryne	2025	Eliteserien	8	0	4	0	—		12	0
Bryne	Total		60	4	6	0	1	0	67	3
Career Total			321	10	39	2	2	0	372	12
