= Osita Henry Chikere =

Nigerian footballer

Personal information
- Full name: Osita Henry Chikere
- Date of birth: 3 February 1991 (age 35)
- Place of birth: Mbaise, Nigeria
- Height: 1.95 m (6 ft 5 in)
- Position: Striker

Senior career*
Years	Team	Apps	(Gls)
2013–2015	Viking	21	(1)
2015	Sogndal	8	(0)
2016–2017	Eastern Suburbs	15	(2)
2018–2019	Rivers United		
2019–2020	Kano Pillars		
- * Club domestic league appearances and goals as of 12:02, 16 February 2022 (UTC)

Osita Henry Chikere (born 3 February 1991) is a Nigerian footballer who plays as a striker.

== Career ==
Chikere was born in Mbaise. He signed a contract for Viking in 2013. He made his debut for the club on 24 August 2013 against Sogndal; they lost the game 1–0. After leaving Viking, he played for Sogndal, Eastern Suburbs, Rivers United and Kano Pillars.

== Career statistics ==
As of match played 5 March 2017

Appearances and goals by club, season and competition
Club	Season	League			Cup		Total	
Club	Season	Division	Apps	Goals	Apps	Goals	Apps	Goals
Viking	2013	Eliteserien	3	0	0	0	3	0
Viking	2014	Eliteserien	13	1	5	3	18	4
Viking	2015	Eliteserien	5	0	3	8	8	8
Viking	Total		21	1	8	11	29	12
Sogndal	2015	Norwegian First Division	8	0	0	0	8	0
Eastern Suburbs	2016–17	New Zealand Football Championship	15	2	0	0	15	2
Career total			44	3	8	11	52	14
