= Vidar Nisja =

Norwegian footballer (born 1986)

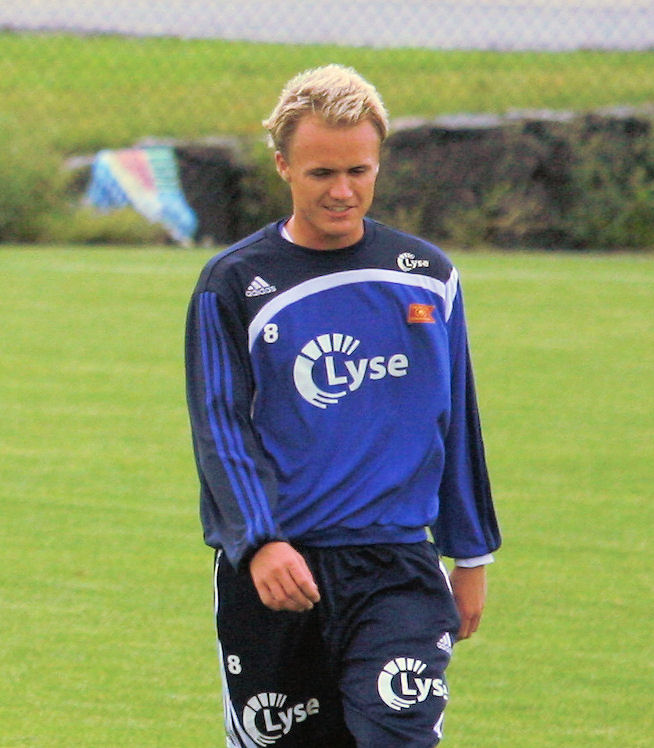

Personal information
- Date of birth: 21 August 1986 (age 40)
- Place of birth: Vigrestad, Norway
- Height: 1.80 m (5 ft 11 in)
- Position: Midfielder

Youth career
- –2004: Vigrestad

Senior career*
Years	Team	Apps	(Gls)
2004–2007	Bryne	73	(5)
2007–2016	Viking	190	(32)
2016–2018	Sandnes Ulf	61	(5)
Total		324	(42)

International career
2005	Norway U19	11	(3)
2006–2008	Norway U21	11	(1)
- * Club domestic league appearances and goals

Vidar Nisja (born 21 August 1986) was a Norwegian midfielder who retired 18 December 2018.

== Career statistics ==
As of 11 November 2018

Club	Season	Division	League		Cup		Europe		Total	
Club	Season	Division	Apps	Goals	Apps	Goals	Apps	Goals	Apps	Goals
2004	Bryne	1. divisjon	15	1	1	0	0	0	16	1
2005	Bryne	1. divisjon	26	4	3	1	0	0	29	5
2006	Bryne	1. divisjon	23	0	1	0	0	0	24	0
2007	Bryne	1. divisjon	9	0	0	0	0	0	9	0
2007	Viking	Tippeligaen	1	1	0	0	0	0	1	1
2008	Viking	Tippeligaen	14	2	2	0	3	0	19	2
2009	Viking	Tippeligaen	28	4	3	0	0	0	31	4
2010	Viking	Tippeligaen	29	3	5	2	0	0	34	5
2011	Viking	Tippeligaen	23	3	5	1	0	0	28	4
2012	Viking	Tippeligaen	27	7	3	2	0	0	30	9
2013	Viking	Tippeligaen	21	1	1	1	0	0	22	2
2014	Viking	Tippeligaen	28	9	2	0	0	0	30	9
2015	Viking	Tippeligaen	19	2	4	1	0	0	23	3
2016	Sandnes Ulf	1. divisjon	24	2	2	2	0	0	26	4
2017	Sandnes Ulf	1. divisjon	26	3	2	1	0	0	28	4
2018	Sandnes Ulf	1. divisjon	9	0	0	0	0	0	9	0
Career Total			322	42	34	11	3	0	359	53

== Personal ==
Nisja has actively participated in KRIK work and has studied at Stavanger Mission College.
