= Trond Erik Bertelsen =

Norwegian footballeer (born 1984)

Trond Bertelsen
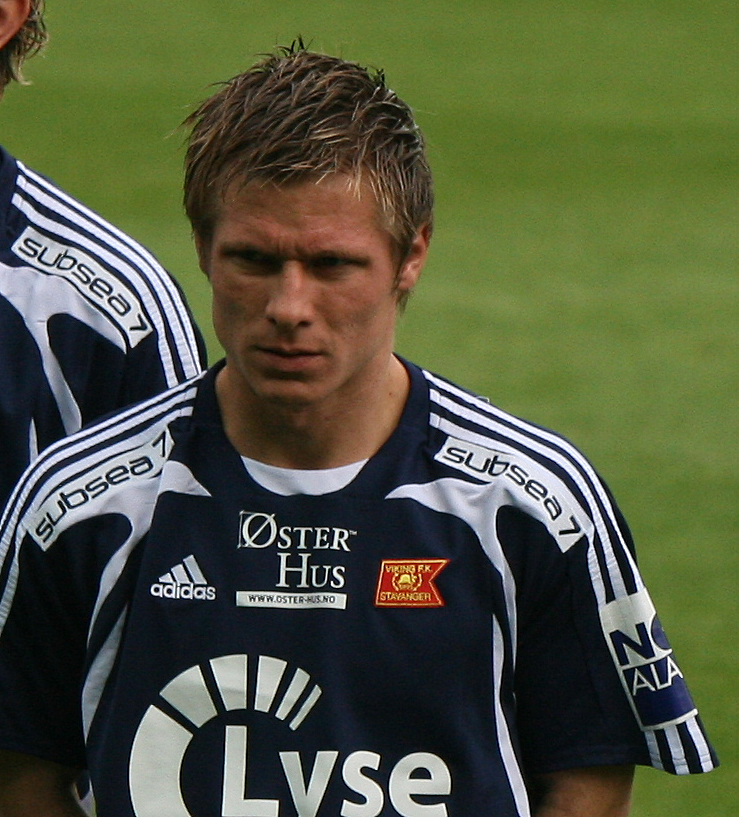
- Trond Erik Bertelsen at Viking Stadion in October 2008

Personal information
- Full name: Trond Erik Bertelsen
- Date of birth: 5 June 1984 (age 42)
- Place of birth: Sandnes, Norway
- Height: 1.71 m (5 ft 7 in)
- Position: Defender

Team information
- Current team: Stavanger

Senior career*
Years	Team	Apps	(Gls)
2001–2004	Haugesund	78	(1)
2005–2007	Fredrikstad	41	(1)
2008–2014	Viking	175	(1)
2015–2016	Sandnes Ulf	42	(0)
2017–	Stavanger		

International career^{‡}
2006–2009	Norway	5	(0)
- * Club domestic league appearances and goals as of 26 October 2016 ‡ National team caps and goals as of 31 January 2010

Trond Erik Bertelsen (born 5 June 1984) is a retired Norwegian football player who currently works for Sandnes Ulf.

He is originally from Sandnes where he played for Lura IL. The fast paced left back has 32 U21-international caps and 30 caps as a younger national team player. Bertelsen came to Fredrikstad FK from FK Haugesund during the winter of 2004, and was one of the first signings of coach Egil «Drillo» Olsen. In January 2006 he made his full international debut for the Norway national football team, and has received a total of three caps (23 September 2007). In 2006 he made four appearances in the Norwegian Football Cup, including an assist in the 3-0 quarter-final win against Vålerenga Fotball as Fredrikstad FK won the cup for the 11th time in the clubs history. Bertelsen also had a trial with Premier League side Aston Villa back in 2001, as a 17-year-old.

Bertelsen was linked to Viking during the summer of 2007, as he was meant to replace the position as left back for the ageing Thomas Pereira. Bertelsen expressed happiness over the possibility of returning to Rogaland to play for Viking. Viking though cancelled the transfer as a result of the knee injury that had plagued him, and worries over his possibilities of returning to top level football. Eventually Bertelsen and the two clubs came to an agreement and a contract was signed with the Stavanger club.

== Career statistics ==
As of 26 October 2016

Club	Season	Division	League		Cup		Continental		Total	
Club	Season	Division	Apps	Goals	Apps	Goals	Apps	Goals	Apps	Goals
2001	Haugesund	Adeccoligaen	3	0	0	0	-		3	0
2002	Haugesund	Adeccoligaen	16	0	1	0	-		17	0
2003	Haugesund	Adeccoligaen	30	0	4	0	-		34	0
2004	Haugesund	Adeccoligaen	29	1	1	0	-		30	1
2005	Fredrikstad	Tippeligaen	25	0	4	1	-		29	1
2006	Fredrikstad	Tippeligaen	16	1	4	1	-		20	2
2007	Fredrikstad	Tippeligaen	0	0	0	0	-		0	0
2008	Viking	Tippeligaen	21	0	4	0	4	0	29	0
2009	Viking	Tippeligaen	26	1	2	0	-		28	1
2010	Viking	Tippeligaen	29	0	5	1	-		34	1
2011	Viking	Tippeligaen	30	0	5	0	-		35	0
2012	Viking	Tippeligaen	29	0	2	0	-		31	0
2013	Viking	Tippeligaen	28	0	3	0	-		31	0
2014	Viking	Tippeligaen	12	0	1	0	-		13	0
2015	Sandnes Ulf	OBOS-ligaen	25	0	1	0	-		26	0
2016	Sandnes Ulf	OBOS-ligaen	17	0	2	0	-		19	0
Career Total			336	3	39	3	4	0	379	6
