= Indriði Sigurðsson =

Icelandic footballer

Personal information
- Full name: Indriði Sigurðsson
- Date of birth: 12 October 1981 (age 45)
- Place of birth: Reykjavík, Iceland
- Height: 1.84 m (6 ft 1/2 in)
- Position: Defender

Senior career*
Years	Team	Apps	(Gls)
1998–1999	KR Reykjavik	25	(0)
2000–2003	Lillestrøm	58	(0)
2003–2006	KRC Genk	76	(2)
2006–2009	Lyn	69	(1)
2009–2016	Viking	171	(10)
2016–2017	KR Reykjavik	26	(1)

International career
1996–1998	Iceland U-17	18	(5)
1998–1999	Iceland U-19	9	(0)
1999–2002	Iceland U-21	17	(0)
2000–2014	Iceland	65	(2)
- * Club domestic league appearances and goals

Indriði Sigurðsson (born 12 October 1981) is an Icelandic former football defender. He last played for the Icelandic club KR Reykjavik.

== Club career ==
He started his career in KR Reykjavik, and went to Norway to play for Lillestrøm SK in 2000. In September 2003 he moved on to KRC Genk in Belgium. Indriði transferred back to KR Reykjavik on 29 July 2006. After a short spell at KR, he was transferred to Lyn on 8 August 2006. On 3 August 2009, Indriði signed for Viking. With a total of 298 appearances, no foreign player has played more games in the Norwegian Premier League than Sigurðsson.

On 28 July 2017, Indriði announced his retirement for health reasons.

== International career ==
Indriði has been capped 65 times and has scored 2 goals for Iceland. He made his debut in January 2000 against Norway.

== Career statistics ==
As of 26 July 2015

Club	Season	Division	League		Cup		Total	
Club	Season	Division	Apps	Goals	Apps	Goals	Apps	Goals
2000	Lillestrøm	Tippeligaen	7	0	n/a	n/a	7	0
2001	Lillestrøm	Tippeligaen	11	0	n/a	n/a	11	0
2002	Lillestrøm	Tippeligaen	22	0	n/a	n/a	22	0
2003	Lillestrøm	Tippeligaen	18	0	n/a	n/a	18	0
2006	Lyn	Tippeligaen	10	0	0	0	10	0
2007	Lyn	Tippeligaen	20	0	2	0	22	0
2008	Lyn	Tippeligaen	24	1	4	0	28	1
2009	Lyn	Tippeligaen	15	0	3	0	18	0
2009	Viking	Tippeligaen	10	0	0	0	10	0
2010	Viking	Tippeligaen	29	2	4	1	33	3
2011	Viking	Tippeligaen	27	0	5	2	32	2
2012	Viking	Tippeligaen	24	1	3	0	27	1
2013	Viking	Tippeligaen	29	3	2	0	31	2
2014	Viking	Tippeligaen	26	3	4	0	30	3
2015	Viking	Tippeligaen	26	1	0	0	26	1
Career Total			298	11	27	3	325	14

=== International goals ===
#	Date	Venue	Opponent	Score	Result	Competition
1.	8 September 2004	Ferenc Szusza Stadium, Budapest, Hungary	Hungary	2–2	3–2	2006 FIFA World Cup qualification
2.	1 April 2009	Hampden Park, Glasgow, Scotland	Scotland	1–1	2–1	2010 FIFA World Cup qualification
