= Jón Daði Böðvarsson =

Icelandic footballer (born 1992)

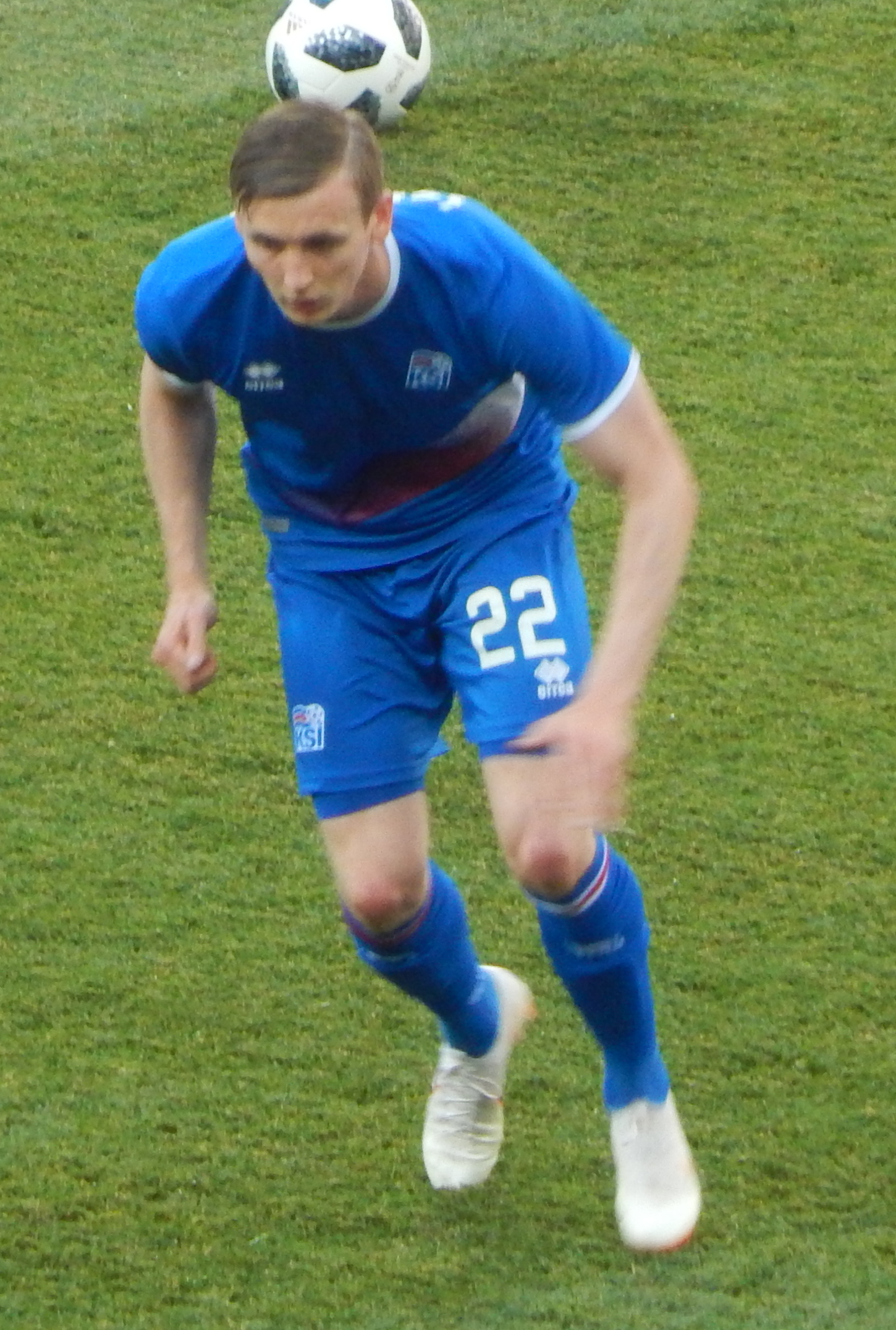
- Böðvarsson training with Iceland at the 2018 FIFA World Cup.

Personal information
- Full name: Jón Daði Böðvarsson
- Date of birth: 25 May 1992 (age 34)
- Place of birth: Selfoss, Iceland
- Height: 1.90 m (6 ft 3 in)
- Position: Forward

Youth career
- –2009: Selfoss
- 2011: → Aarhus U19 (loan)

Senior career*
Years	Team	Apps	(Gls)
2009–2012	Selfoss	80	(18)
2013–2015	Viking	81	(15)
2016	1. FC Kaiserslautern	15	(2)
2016–2017	Wolverhampton Wanderers	42	(3)
2017–2019	Reading	53	(14)
2019–2022	Millwall	69	(5)
2022–2024	Bolton Wanderers	78	(14)
2024–2025	Wrexham	4	(0)
2025	Burton Albion	13	(5)
2025–2026	Selfoss	17	(7)

International career^{‡}
2009–2010	Iceland U19	7	(1)
2011–2014	Iceland U21	12	(2)
2012–2022	Iceland	64	(4)
- * Club domestic league appearances and goals as of 22 July 2026 ‡ National team caps and goals as of 30 March 2022

Jón Daði Böðvarsson (transliterated as Jon Dadi Bodvarsson; born 25 May 1992) is an Icelandic former professional footballer who played as a striker. Jón Daði is the grandson of two of Iceland's premier writers, Þorsteinn frá Hamri and Ásta Sigurðardóttir.

== Club career ==
=== Selfoss ===
Jón Daði began his senior career during the 2009 season in the Icelandic second tier with Selfoss, scoring 20 as their side were promoted to the Icelandic top flight. After being loaned to the youth ranks of the Danish club Aarhus for four months in 2011, he returned to Selfoss, who had been relegated in the meantime. They scored seventy times during the 2011 season as the club were promoted back to the top flight.

=== Viking ===
After netting a further seventy goals back in the top division, Jón Daði moved to the Norwegian side Viking in November 2012.

=== Kaiserslautern ===
During three seasons in the Norwegian top flight, he scored 15 times before leaving for German second division side 1. FC Kaiserslautern in January 2016, with whom he had already signed a pre-contract in June 2015 for a three-year deal. He made his Kaiserslautern debut on 5 February 2016 against Union Berlin and scored the first of two goals for the team on 4 March 2016 in a 1–2 defeat at Nürnberg.

=== Wolverhampton Wanderers ===
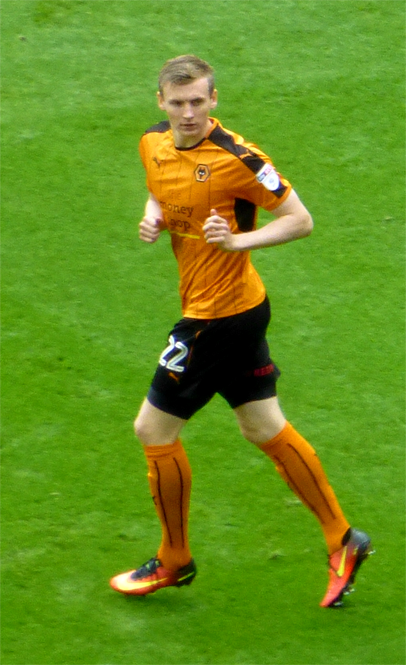
Jón Daði Böðvarsson playing for Wolverhampton Wanderers in 2016.

On 2 August 2016, Jón Daði signed for English Championship side Wolverhampton Wanderers for an undisclosed fee on a three-year deal. He scored his first goal on his debut for the club on 6 August 2016 in a 2–2 draw against Rotherham. His debut simultaneously meant he became the 1,000th player to appear in a league game for the club. Jón Daði scored his second goal for Wolves on 20 August, scoring the final goal in Wolves' 3–1 win against Birmingham City. His third and final goal for Wolves was in a 3–1 defeat to Bristol City in April 2017.

=== Reading ===
Despite being a fan favourite at Wolves, he moved to fellow English Championship side Reading in a three-year deal for an undisclosed fee on 14 July 2017. He scored his first goal for Reading in a 2–0 win at Birmingham City on 26 August 2017. His first hat trick for Reading was on 16 January 2018 in the 3rd round of the FA Cup.

=== Millwall ===
On 12 July 2019, he signed for fellow Championship side Millwall for an undisclosed fee. He scored his first goals for Millwall when he scored twice in an EFL Cup tie against Oxford United on 27 August 2019.

=== Bolton Wanderers ===
On 20 January 2022, he signed for League One side Bolton Wanderers on an eighteen-month contract after his Millwall contract was cancelled, taking over the number 9 shirt from the recently departed Eoin Doyle. On 2 April, Bolton won 4–0 against Plymouth Argyle in the 2023 EFL Trophy Final He missed the match through injury, though still received a medal as he had played in the earlier rounds. On 13 June 2023, he signed a new initial one-year deal, keeping him at Bolton for at least another season. On 2 December 2023, he scored a first half hat-trick against Harrogate Town in the FA Cup. On 22 May 2024, the club confirmed that he would be leaving at the end of his contract on 30 June.

=== Wrexham ===
On 25 October 2024, Jón Daði signed for Wrexham on a short-term deal.

=== Burton Albion ===
On 16 January 2025, Jón Daði joined fellow League One club Burton Albion following his contract at Wrexham being cancelled by mutual consent. He scored on his debut for Burton Albion, in a 2–1 win over Wigan Athletic on 21 January 2025

On 13 May 2025, the club said it had offered the player a new contract. However, Jón Daði declined the offer, opting to return to Iceland with his family after almost 10 years in England.

=== Return to Selfoss ===
On 1 July 2025, Jón Daði returned to home-town club Selfoss.

== International career ==
Having already played for Iceland at under-19 and under-21 level, Jón Daði made his full international debut on 14 November 2012 as a substitute in a friendly against Andorra. He scored his first international goal on 9 September 2014 in a 3–0 victory over Turkey during Euro 2016 qualifying.

He was selected for UEFA Euro 2016, the first international tournament for which Iceland had ever qualified. Jón Daði started all five matches at the tournament in France and scored in the final group game against Austria which ensured the Icelanders' progress from the group phase.

On 27 June 2016, Jón Daði played against England in the UEFA Euro 2016 round of 16 at the Stade de Nice, as Iceland upset England with a 2–1 victory to advance to the quarter-finals.

Jón Daði was called up to Iceland's 23-man squad for the 2018 FIFA World Cup on 11 May 2018.

== Career statistics ==
=== Club ===
As of match played 29 April 2025

Appearances and goals by club, season and competition
Club	Season	League			National Cup		League Cup		Other		Total	
Club	Season	Division	Apps	Goals	Apps	Goals	Apps	Goals	Apps	Goals	Apps	Goals
Selfoss	2008	1. deild karla	0	0	1	0	0	0	—		1	0
Selfoss	2009	1. deild karla	16	1	2	0	5	0	—		23	1
Selfoss	2010	Úrvalsdeild	21	3	1	0	7	2	—		29	5
Selfoss	2011	1. deild karla	21	7	2	0	0	0	—		23	7
Selfoss	2012	Úrvalsdeild	22	7	3	1	7	0	—		32	8
Selfoss	Total		80	18	9	1	19	2	—		108	21
Viking	2013	Tippeligaen	23	1	2	1	—		—		25	2
Viking	2014	Tippeligaen	29	5	3	1	—		—		32	6
Viking	2015	Tippeligaen	29	9	6	6	—		—		35	15
Viking	Total		81	15	11	8	—		—		92	23
1. FC Kaiserslautern	2015–16	2. Bundesliga	15	2	0	0	—		—		15	2
Wolverhampton Wanderers	2016–17	Championship	42	3	3	0	3	0	—		48	3
Reading	2017–18	Championship	33	7	2	3	1	0	—		36	10
Reading	2018–19	Championship	20	7	0	0	0	0	—		20	7
Reading	Total		53	14	2	3	1	0	—		56	17
Millwall	2019–20	Championship	31	4	2	0	2	2	—		35	6
Millwall	2020–21	Championship	38	1	1	0	1	0	—		40	1
Millwall	2021–22	Championship	0	0	0	0	1	0	—		1	0
Millwall	Total		69	5	3	0	4	2	—		76	7
Bolton Wanderers	2021–22	League One	21	7	0	0	0	0	0	0	21	7
Bolton Wanderers	2022–23	League One	21	3	1	1	1	1	4 (Note: Appearance(s) in the EFL Trophy.)	3	27	8
Bolton Wanderers	2023–24	League One	36	4	4	3	1	0	5	3	46	10
Bolton Wanderers	Total		78	14	5	4	2	1	9	6	94	25
Wrexham	2024–25	League One	4	0	1	0	0	0	2	0	7	0
Burton Albion	2024–25	League One	13	5	0	0	0	0	0	0	13	5
Career total			435	76	34	16	29	5	11	6	509	103

=== International ===
As of matches played 29 March 2022

Appearances and goals by national team and year
National team	Year	Apps	Goals
Iceland	2012	1	0
Iceland	2013	0	0
Iceland	2014	7	1
Iceland	2015	10	0
Iceland	2016	12	1
Iceland	2017	6	0
Iceland	2018	5	0
Iceland	2019	7	1
Iceland	2020	6	0
Iceland	2021	5	0
Iceland	2022	4	1
Total		64	4

Scores and results list Iceland's goal tally first, score column indicates score after each Jón Daði goal.

List of international goals scored by Jón Daði Böðvarsson
No.	Date	Venue	Opponent	Score	Result	Competition	Ref.
1	9 September 2014	Laugardalsvöllur, Reykjavík, Iceland	Turkey	1–0	3–0	2016 UEFA Euro qualification	
2	22 June 2016	Stade de France, Saint-Denis, France	Austria	1–0	2–1	UEFA Euro 2016	
3	7 September 2019	Laugardalsvöllur, Reykjavík, Iceland	Moldova	3–0	3–0	UEFA Euro 2020 qualification	
4	12 January 2022	Titanic Deluxe Belek Football Center, Antalya, Turkey	Uganda	1–0	1–1	Friendly	

== Honours ==
Selfoss

- 1. deild karla: 2009; runner-up/promotion: 2011

Bolton Wanderers

- EFL Trophy: 2022–23
