= Julian Veen Uldal =

Norwegian footballer (born 1997)

Personal information
- Full name: Julian Veen Uldal
- Date of birth: 11 June 1997 (age 29)
- Place of birth: Stavanger, Norway
- Height: 1.71 m (5 ft 7 1/2 in)
- Position: Full-back

Youth career
- Tasta
- 2012–2014: Viking

Senior career*
Years	Team	Apps	(Gls)
2014–2015	Viking	2	(0)
2016	Randaberg	11	(1)
2017	Brodd	10	(2)
2017–2018	Lyn	6	(0)
2019	Brodd	1	(0)
2019–	BI Athletics	2	(0)

International career^{‡}
2012	Norway U15	3	(0)
2013	Norway U16	16	(0)
2014	Norway U17	9	(0)
2014–2015	Norway U18	5	(0)
2015	Norway U19	1	(0)
- * Club domestic league appearances and goals as of 12 July 2020 ‡ National team caps and goals as of 12 July 2020

Julian Veen Uldal (born 11 June 1997) is a Norwegian footballer who played as a full-back.

He hails from Stavanger, and started his career in Tasta IL.

He made his first team debut for Viking FK in the 2014 Norwegian Football Cup. He later made his league debut as a substitute in the last game of the 2014 season. After spending 2016 in Randaberg he moved back and forth between Stavanger and Oslo, and clubs like Brodd and Lyn.
