= Kjell Jonevret =

Swedish football player and manager (born 1962)

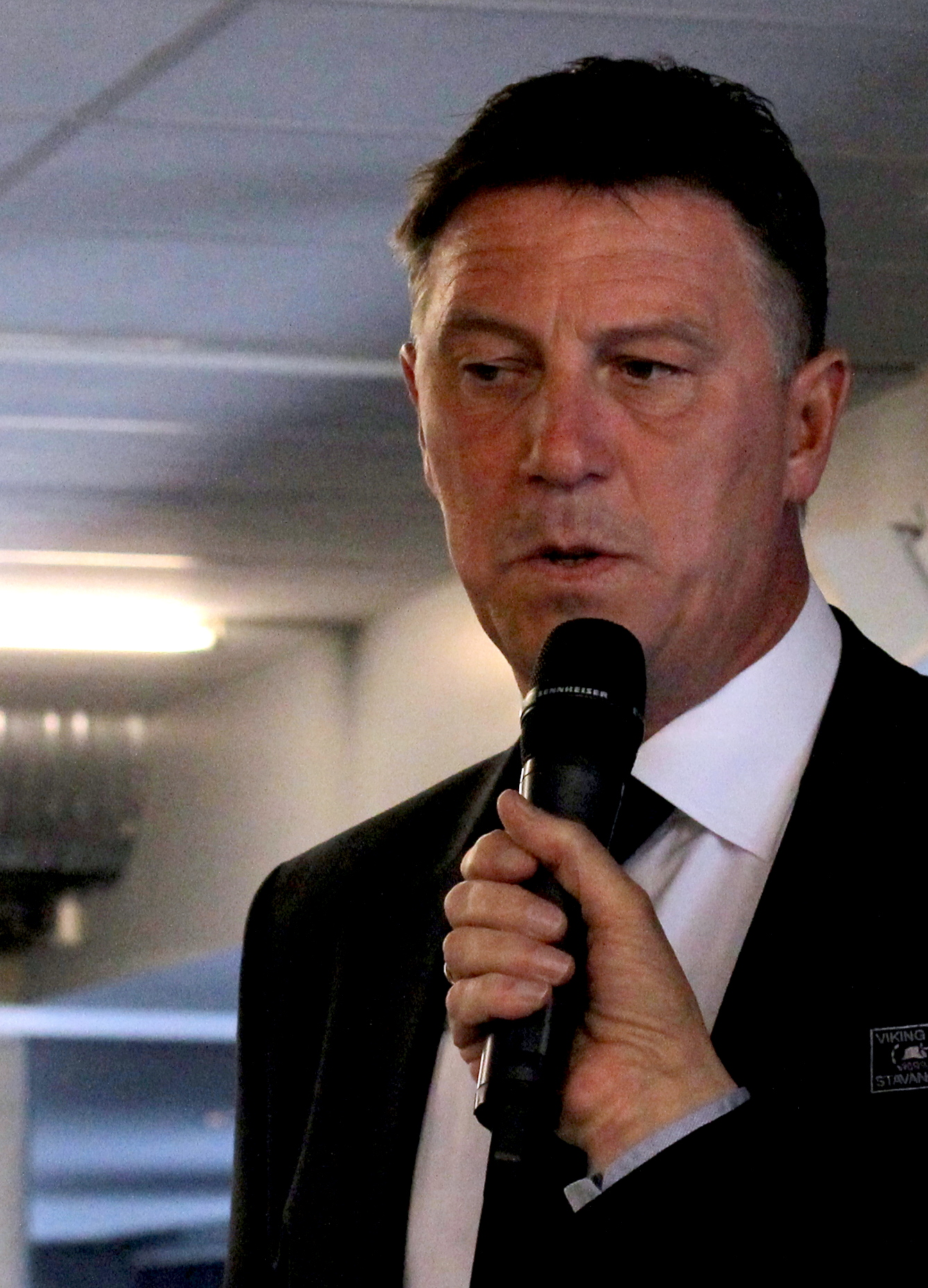
- Jonevret in 2014

Personal information
- Full name: Kjell Anders Jonevret
- Date of birth: 28 June 1962 (age 64)
- Place of birth: Stockholm, Sweden
- Position: Forward

Senior career*
Years	Team	Apps	(Gls)
1979–1983	Brommapojkarna		
1984–1985	AIK		
1985–1988	Brommapojkarna		
1989–1990	Viking	43	(19)
1990–1992	Vasalund		

International career
1979	Sweden U19	5	(1)

Managerial career
- 1993–1994: Vasalund (assistant)
- 1995: Brommapojkarna (U19)
- 1996–1997: AIK (assistant)
- 1998: Sirius
- 1999–2000: Västerås
- 2001–2003: Café Opera
- 2004–2006: Djurgården
- 2006–2010: Molde
- 2012–2016: Viking
- 2017: Orlando Pirates
- 2019: Brommapojkarna
- 2023–: Karlstad
- * Club domestic league appearances and goals

Kjell Anders Jonevret (born 28 June 1962) is a Swedish football coach and a former player.

== Managerial career ==
Jonevret managed Djurgården between 2004 and 2006. During his time in Djurgården, he led his team to the double, winning both the Allsvenskan and the Swedish cup in 2005.

He was hired as the manager for Molde in December 2006, but left the club in August 2010

Jonevret was appointed manager of South African team Orlando Pirates in February 2017 and resigned in August 2017 amid speculation he was about to be replaced.

== Managerial statistics ==
As of 12 October 2017

Team	From	To	Record				
Team	From	To	G	W	D	L	Win %
Molde	4 December 2006	30 August 2010	115	52	27	36	45.22
Viking	19 June 2012	14 November 2016	156	72	36	48	46.15
Orlando Pirates	20 February 2017	2 August 2017	18	6	7	5	33.33
Brommapojkarna	1 September 2019	30 November 2019	9	3	3	3	33.33
Karlstad	1 June 2023	Present	22	11	2	9	50.00
Total			320	144	75	101	45.00

== Honours ==
=== As a player ===
AIK

- Svenska cupen: 1984–85

Viking

- Norwegian football cup: 1989

=== As a manager ===
Djurgården:

- Allsvenskan: 2005
- Svenska Cupen: 2005

Molde

- Norwegian football cup runner-up: 2009
- Tippeligaen runner-up: 2009

=== Individual ===
- Swedish Manager of the Year: 2005
