= 2013 Norwegian Football Cup =

Norgesmesterskapet i fotball for herrer

Tournament details
- Country: Norway
- Teams: 272 (overall); 128 (main competition)

Final positions
- Champions: Molde (3rd title)
- Runners-up: Rosenborg

Tournament statistics
- Matches played: 127
- Goals scored: 528 (4.16 per match)
- Top goal scorer(s): Nicki Billie Nielsen (8 goals)

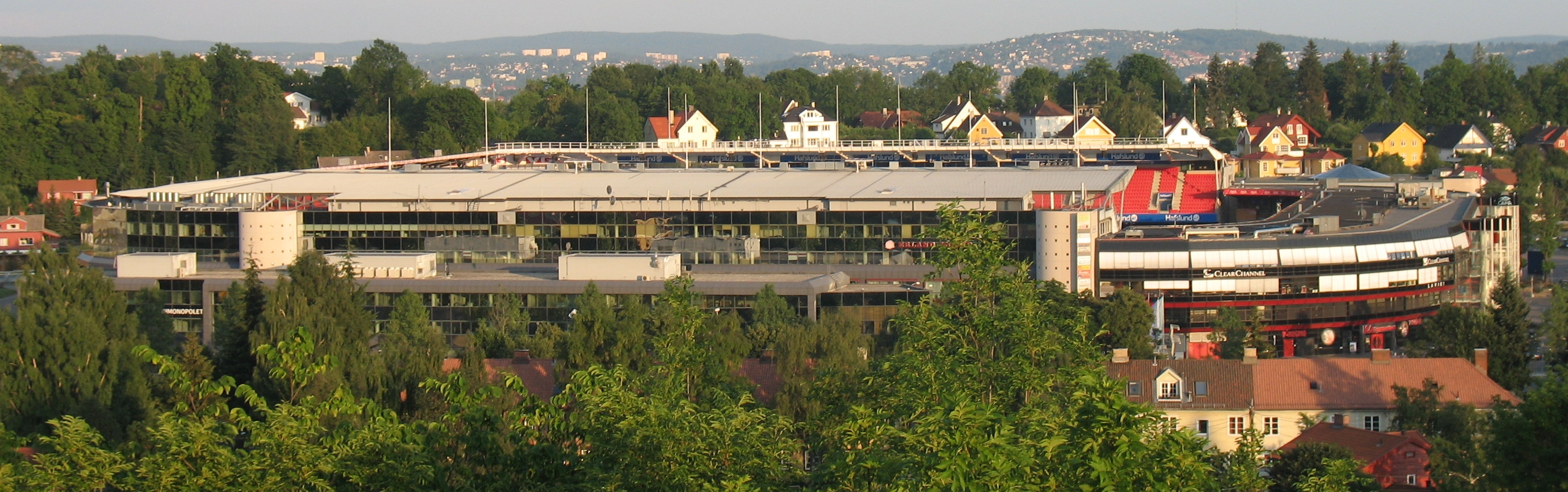
Ullevaal Stadion, Oslo – venue for the Norwegian Cup final

The 2013 Norwegian Football Cup was the 108th season of the Norwegian annual knockout football tournament. It began with qualification matches in March 2013. The first round was played 17 April 2013 and the tournament ended with the final on 24 November 2013, which Molde won by beating Rosenborg 4–2.

The victory earned Molde a place in the second qualifying round of the 2014–15 UEFA Europa League.

== Calendar ==
Below are the dates for each round as given by the official schedule:

Round	Main date	Number of fixtures	Clubs
First qualifying round	17 March 2013	96	272 → 176
Second qualifying round	1 April 2013	48	176 → 128
First round	16–18 April 2013	64	128 → 64
Second round	1/2 May 2013	32	64 → 32
Third round	29/30 May 2013	16	32 → 16
Fourth round	19/26 June 2013	8	16 → 8
Quarter-finals	3/4 July 2013	4	8 → 4
Semi-finals	25/26 September 2013	2	4 → 2
Final	24 November 2013	1	2 → 1

== First round ==
The 48 winners from the second qualifying round joined with 80 clubs from the Tippeligaen, First Division and Second Division in this round of the competition. The matches took place on 16, 17 and 18 April 2013.

Number of teams per tier entering this round
Tippeligaen (1)	1. divisjon (2)	2. divisjon (3)	3. divisjon (4)	4. divisjon (5)	Total
16 / 16	16 / 16	49 / 56	41 / 164	6 / 314	128 / 566

16 April 2013	Vigør (4)	0–2	(1) Start	Kristiansand
18:00 CEST (UTC+2)		Report	Vilhjálmsson 9'; Brattum 38' (o.g.)	Stadium: Hellemyr kunstgress Attendance: 1,148; Referee: Espen Larsen

16 April 2013	Frigg (3)	1–6	(1) Vålerenga	Oslo
18:30 CEST (UTC+2)	Eide 10'	Report	Zajić 21'; Abdellaoue 24', 45'; Berre 30'; Larsen 63'; Fellah 80'	Stadium: Frogner Stadion; Attendance: 1,051; Referee: Bjørn Hansen

17 April 2013	Kirkenes (4)	1–8	(1) Tromsø	Kirkenes
17:00 CEST (UTC+2)	Blix 12'	Report	Bendiksen 8', 55'; Nystrøm 14', 47'; Drage 18'; Jenssen 27'; Prijović 50', 65'	Stadium: Kirkenes Stadion; Attendance: 760; Referee: Kim Rune Lydersen

17 April 2013	Sprint-Jeløy (4)	0–2	(3) Moss	Moss
17:30 CEST (UTC+2)		Report	Dujaka 80', 90'	Stadium: Bellevue; Attendance: 570; Referee: Ole-Alexander Ekeli Valen

17 April 2013	Ålgård (3)	5–5 (a.e.t.) (3–4 p)	(3) Egersund	Ålgård
18:00 CEST (UTC+2)	Kjeldner 6'; Nielsen 8', 83'; Valsson 89'; Melhus 108'	Report	Sleveland 22'; M. Andersen 30'; Grande 43'; Haaland 84', 103'	Stadium: Ålgård Stadion; Attendance: 150; Referee: Ola Kellerhals

17 April 2013	Avaldsnes (5)	1–7	(1) Sandnes Ulf	Avaldsnes
18:00 CEST (UTC+2)	Aarvik 57'	Report	Helle 20' (pen.), 38'; Ricketts 22', 54'; Thorsteinsson 34'; Hetland 55' (o.g.); Olsson 62'	Stadium: Avaldsnes 1 Attendance: 50; Referee: Jan Morten Tennøy

17 April 2013	Bærum (3)	3–1	(4) Oslo City	Sandvika
18:00 CEST (UTC+2)	Mahnin 3', 34'; Berg 74'	Report	Tavakoli 44'	Stadium: Sandvika Stadion; Attendance: 100; Referee: Stig Jonny Unhammer

17 April 2013	Birkebeineren (3)	1–0	(3) Valdres	Nedre Eiker
18:00 CEST (UTC+2)	Frøshaug 58'	Report		Stadium: Årbogen nye gress Attendance: 50; Referee: Espen Hovland

17 April 2013	Bossekop (3)	1–4	(3) Alta	Alta
18:00 CEST (UTC+2)	Eriksen 23'	Report	Nikolaisen 22', 52'; Thomassen 84'; Mathisen 90'	Stadium: Finnmarkshallen; Attendance: 648; Referee: Vegar Ballovarre

17 April 2013	Brattvåg (4)	1–4	(2) Hødd	Brattvåg
18:00 CEST (UTC+2)	Bjørk 58'	Report	Heltne 25'; Helland 53'; Brandal 85'; Sandal 90+'	Stadium: Brattvåg gras Attendance: 445; Referee: Christina Westrum Pedersen

17 April 2013	Brodd (4)	2–5	(1) Haugesund	Storhaug
18:00 CEST (UTC+2)	Hovland Olsen 35'; Skoftedalen Fiskum 50'	Report	Skimmeland Aasheim 21'; Kjelsrud Johansen 45+1', 54'; Anyora 85'; Sema 90+3'	Stadium: Midjord idrettspark Referee: Jørn Voll

17 April 2013	Brumunddal (4)	0–2	(2) Elverum	Brumunddal
18:00 CEST (UTC+2)		Report	Brekke 42'; Emeh 46'	Stadium: Sveum Idrettspark; Attendance: 531; Referee: Tommy Frydenlund

17 April 2013	Buvik (4)	0–11	(1) Rosenborg	Buvika
18:00 CEST (UTC+2)		Report	Selnæs 13'; Moe 17'; Dočkal 21', 79'; Nielsen 24', 37'; Chibuike 45', 73'; Elyounoussi 62', 84', 90+2'	Stadium: Buvik Stadion; Attendance: 1,800; Referee: Rikhard Haugen Lyng

17 April 2013	Drøbak/Frogn (3)	2–3	(2) Follo	Drøbak
18:00 CEST (UTC+2)	Latyr 64'; Røssevold 90'	Report	Reier 6'; Markegård 36'; Karoliussen 52'	Stadium: Seiersten Stadion; Attendance: 333; Referee: Torkjell Jonsson Trædal

17 April 2013	Elnesvågen/Omegn (3)	0–5	(1) Molde	Elnesvågen
18:00 CEST (UTC+2)		Report	Coly 25', 30', 35', 60'; Agnaldo 51'	Stadium: Elnesvågen Stadion; Referee: Mathias Smehus Kringstad

17 April 2013	Fløy (3)	5–0	(4) Lyngdal	Kristiansand
18:00 CEST (UTC+2)	Richardsen 5'; Rasmussen 10' (o.g.); Werner 31'; Dreshaj 56'; Norheim 74'	Report		Stadium: Flekkerøy Stadion; Attendance: 164; Referee: Karl Anders Sletten

17 April 2013	Førde (3)	1–2	(4) Florø	Førde
18:00 CEST (UTC+2)	Nygård 65'	Report	Ryland 8'; Bauge 84'	Stadium: Førde Stadion; Attendance: 372; Referee: Kristoffer Hagenes

17 April 2013	Grorud (3)	2–2 (a.e.t.) (4–1 p)	(3) Gjøvik	Oslo
18:00 CEST (UTC+2)	Mankowitz 54'; Lekaj 103'	Report	T. Andersen 36'; Grønstad 93'	Stadium: Grorud matchbane Referee: Fredrik Barth Brekke
	Penalties
	Hatlén (penalty scored); Jensen (penalty scored); Slorby (penalty scored); Lekaj (penalty scored)		(penalty missed) Kollshaugen; (penalty scored) Haugland; (penalty missed) Furuseth

17 April 2013	Hallingdal (5)	0–11	(1) Strømsgodset	Hallingdal
18:00 CEST (UTC+2)		Report	Horn 2'; Wikheim 9'; Kovács 14', 45+1'; Kwakwa 27', 39'; Fossum 34'; Gundersen 75', 84'; Sørum 88', 90+4'	Stadium: Gol kunstgress Attendance: 1,900; Referee: Ole-Martin Loeshagen

17 April 2013	Hauerseter (4)	0–6	(2) HamKam	Jessheim
18:00 CEST (UTC+2)		Report	Sildnes 4'; Adebahr 47', 58', 89'; Hagen 69'; Gundersen 75'	Stadium: UKI Arena; Referee: Christian Moen

17 April 2013	Holmen (4)	0–3	(1) Hønefoss	Holmen
18:00 CEST (UTC+2)		Report	Larsen 13'; Mora 27' di Vita Jensen 42'	Stadium: Holmen gress Attendance: 587; Referee: Kristian Randen

17 April 2013	Hovding (5)	0–14	(1) Brann	Bergen
18:00 CEST (UTC+2)		Report	Gjesdal 5'; Barmen 12', 42', 74'; Finne 14', 64', 83', 87'; Kalve 24', 50'; Pavlov 53'; Larsen 61', 89', 90'	Stadium: Åstveit idrettspark Referee: Petter Toppe

17 April 2013	Husøy/Føynland (5)	0–5	(1) Odd	Husøy
18:00 CEST (UTC+2)		Report	Rashani 22'; Kleiven 40'; Krogsgård 41'; Johnsen 62'; Fredriksen 79'	Stadium: Husøy Arena; Attendance: 686; Referee: Rohit Saggi

17 April 2013	KIL/Hemne (4)	0–1	(2) Ranheim	Kyrksæterøra
18:00 CEST (UTC+2)		Report	Aas 71'	Stadium: Ånesøyan gras Referee: Dag Vidar Hafsås

17 April 2013	Kopervik (4)	0–5	(2) Bryne	Kopervik
18:00 CEST (UTC+2)		Report	Urstad 24'; Khalili 38'; Jakobsen 75', 86'; Khattab 82'	Stadium: Åsebøen Stadion; Attendance: 260; Referee: Kai Erik Steen

17 April 2013	KFUM Oslo (3)	1–0	(3) Fram Larvik	Oslo
18:00 CEST (UTC+2)	Hagen 70'	Report		Stadium: KFUM Arena; Attendance: 138; Referee: Ola Skjørli Oterhals

17 April 2013	Kråkerøy (4)	1–6	(2) Fredrikstad	Kråkerøy
18:00 CEST (UTC+2)	Holberg 29'	Report	Halvorsen 64', 77'; Standerholen 81', 90'; Westgaard 88'; Anier 90+2'	Stadium: Kråkerøy Stadion; Attendance: 2,073; Referee: Tom Henning Øvrebø

17 April 2013	Kvik Halden (3)	2–0	(4) Askim	Halden
18:00 CEST (UTC+2)	Eriksen 31'; Taletović 45+1'	Report		Stadium: Halden Stadion; Attendance: 131; Referee: Mads Andreas Ahlsen

17 April 2013	Larsnes/Gursken (4)	0–5	(1) Aalesund	Gursken
18:00 CEST (UTC+2)		Report	Hamed Allah 37', 66', 75'; Tollås 58'; Nordvik 87'	Stadium: River Plate Stadion; Attendance: 1,208; Referee: Even Myrheim

17 April 2013	Grei (5)	0–5	(3) Kjelsås	Rødtvet
18:00 CEST (UTC+2)		Report	Pettersen 9', 31'; Akinyemi 19'; Solvang 55'; Frøystveit 82'	Stadium: Grei gress Attendance: 200; Referee: Knut Ivar Strømstad

17 April 2013	Lyn (3)	3–1 (a.e.t.)	(3) Eidsvold Turn	Oslo
18:00 CEST (UTC+2)	Kristoffersen 64'; Moen 95', 103'	Report	Økland 22'	Stadium: Frogner Stadion; Attendance: 778; Referee: Anders Overgård Hauglund

17 April 2013	Nesodden (3)	0–3	(2) Kongsvinger	Nesodden
18:00 CEST (UTC+2)		Report	Myklebust 2'; Johannesen 14', 36'	Stadium: Nesodden Idrettsforening; Attendance: 216; Referee: Espen Eskås

17 April 2013	Nest-Sotra (3)	4–1	(4) Sotra	Ågotnes
18:00 CEST (UTC+2)	Haugen 25'; Pluemjai 43'; Nilsen 85', 90+2'	Report	Moen 83'	Stadium: Ågotnes Stadion; Attendance: 150; Referee: Steinar Hauge

17 April 2013	Nybergsund (3)	3–1 (a.e.t.)	(4) Tynset	Trysil
18:00 CEST (UTC+2)	Nygård 90'; Tøraasen 95'; Mwesigye 105'	Report	Flatgård 43'	Stadium: Nybergsund Stadion; Attendance: 170; Referee: Espen Berntsen

17 April 2013	Notodden (3)	0–2	(3) Asker	Notodden
18:00 CEST (UTC+2)		Report	Abshir 53'; Tollås 70'	Stadium: Notodden Stadion; Attendance: 302; Referee: Richard Børnick-Isaksen

17 April 2013	Oppsal (4)	1–7	(2) Ull/Kisa	Oslo
18:00 CEST (UTC+2)	Bjørseth 48'	Report	Christiansen 11'; Dos Santos 30', 89', 90+1'; Suleiman 46'; Langås 83'; Giæver 84'	Stadium: Trasop matchbane Attendance: 450; Referee: Tore Olsen Hagelund

17 April 2013	Ørn-Horten (4)	0–5	(2) Stabæk	Horten
18:00 CEST (UTC+2)		Report	Stokkelien 54', 56', 65'; Boli 78', 89'	Stadium: Lystlunden; Referee: Raymond Nyberg

17 April 2013	Ottestad (4)	0–4	(2) Strømmen	Ottestad
18:00 CEST (UTC+2)		Report	Stamsø Møller 22', 24', 68'; Brandtzæg 28'	Stadium: Ottestad Idrettspark; Attendance: 100; Referee: Martin Lundby

17 April 2013	Øystese (4)	3–2	(3) Arna-Bjørnar	Øystese
18:00 CEST (UTC+2)	Raunehaug 31'; Næs 42'; Nymark Brown 90+3'	Report	Aleksander Nilsen 56'; Fedje 59'	Stadium: Øystese Idrettsplass; Attendance: 150; Referee: Andre Holtar Arnholt

17 April 2013	Pors Grenland (3)	2–1 (a.e.t.)	(3) Arendal	Porsgrunn
18:00 CEST (UTC+2)	Lundeberg Enger 37'; Heldal 106'	Report	Rnkovic 44'	Stadium: Pors Stadion; Attendance: 198; Referee: Tim-Nicolai Fjellvang

17 April 2013	Skedsmo (3)	0–4	(1) Lillestrøm	Skedsmokorset
18:00 CEST (UTC+2)		Report	Pálmason 1', 22'; Gulbrandsen 33', 65'	Stadium: Skedsmo Stadion; Attendance: 1,500; Referee: Per Erik Haugen

17 April 2013	Solberg (4)	0–10	(2) Mjøndalen	Solbergelva
18:00 CEST (UTC+2)		Report	Belaska 11', 43'; Stokke 14', 16', 74'; Krantz 31', 53'; Ottesen 33'; Fossum 37'; Skagestad 84'	Stadium: Solberg gress Attendance: 750; Referee: Mohammad Usman Aslam

17 April 2013	Sparta Sarpsborg (4)	0–3	(1) Sarpsborg 08	Sarpsborg
18:00 CEST (UTC+2)		Report	Valdimarsson 1'; Thømt Jensen 24'; Jørgensen 57'	Stadium: Sarpsborg Stadion; Attendance: 591; Referee: Thomas Lilleby

17 April 2013	Stavanger (5)	0–5	(2) Vard Haugesund	Stavanger
18:00 CEST (UTC+2)		Report	Ulland Andersen 3', 50'; Avalos 4', 39'; Grov 56'	Stadium: SIF Stadion; Attendance: 50; Referee: Daniel Higraff

17 April 2013	Tønsberg (3)	1–1 (a.e.t.) (4–2 p)	(3) Østsiden	Tønsberg
18:00 CEST (UTC+2)	Fagelund Møllerplass 73'	Report	Gholamreza 44'	Stadium: Tønsberg Gressbane; Attendance: 70; Referee: Rune Nilsen
	Penalties
	Onshuus (penalty scored); Rinaldo Pedersen (penalty scored); Abrahamsen Bendu (penalty scored); Markussen (penalty scored)		(penalty scored) Magnussen; (penalty missed) Laabak; (penalty missed) Gholamreza; (penalty scored) Cicek

17 April 2013	Tornado Måløy (4)	0–4	(1) Sogndal	Måløy
18:00 CEST (UTC+2)		Report	Lund 4', 24'; Karadas 47', 59'	Stadium: Måløy Stadion; Attendance: 200; Referee: Jonny Skjerven

17 April 2013	Tromsdalen (3)	1–0 (a.e.t.)	(4) Skarp	Tromsø
18:00 CEST (UTC+2)	Kristoffersen 95'	Report		Stadium: Tromsdalen Stadion; Attendance: 161; Referee: Marius Jespersen

17 April 2013	Ullern (4)	2–1 (a.e.t.)	(3) Lørenskog	Oslo
18:00 CEST (UTC+2)	Lundefaret 71'; Christensson 120+1'	Report	Abdel El Moussaoui 50'	Stadium: Ullern gress Attendance: 50; Referee: Ajdin Medic

17 April 2013	Vadmyra (4)	2–3	(3) Åsane	Vadmyra
18:00 CEST (UTC+2)	Moen Rye 48', 67'	Report	Hammersland 23'; Gaustad 33'; Lerpold 75'	Stadium: Vadmyra Kunstgress; Attendance: 130; Referee: Bjørn Magne Bakkom

17 April 2013	Vaulen (4)	0–4	(1) Viking	Vaulen
18:00 CEST (UTC+2)		Report	Gyan 9'; Böðvarsson 20'; Thioune 40'; Haugen 78'	Stadium: Vaulenbanen; Attendance: 503; Referee: Ole Gya

17 April 2013	Vidar (3)	4–3	(4) Staal Jørpeland	Stavanger
18:00 CEST (UTC+2)	Herrem 45+1', 88'; Vikesdal Pedersen 52'; Berntsen 90+3'	Report	Juliusson 8'; Danielsen 15'; Danielsen 68'	Stadium: Lassa Gress; Attendance: 50; Referee: Cosmin Dima

17 April 2013	Mjølner (4)	1–5	(3) Harstad	Narvik
19:00 CEST (UTC+2)	Oluoch 24'	Report	Balteskard 6', 90+2'; Chappy 51'; Bakke 71'; Fjellstad 73'	Stadium: Narvik Stadion; Attendance: 164; Referee: Geir-Oskar Isaksen

17 April 2013	Fløya (4)	1–0	(3) Senja	Tromsø
20:00 CEST (UTC+2)	Mathisen 48'	Report		Stadium: Fløyabanen; Attendance: 75; Referee: Stig Are Sørensen

18 April 2013	Junkeren (4)	3–7	(2) Bodø/Glimt	Bodø
17:30 CEST (UTC+2)	Want 40', 69', 79'	Report	Pedersen 4', 12'; Richards 15'; Konradsen 37'; Nordberg 39', 90+3'; Braaten 67'	Stadium: Bodø Spektrum; Attendance: 648; Referee: Birgitta Solberg

18 April 2013	Byåsen (3)	1–0	(4) Stjørdals-Blink	Trondheim
18:00 CEST (UTC+2)	Kvande 90+4'	Report		Stadium: Byåsen Arena; Attendance: 204; Referee: Kristian Aune

18 April 2013	Fyllingsdalen (3)	2–2 (a.e.t.) (5–4 p)	(3) Fana	Bergen
18:00 CEST (UTC+2)	Edvardsen 2'; Glesnes 40'	Report	Dankertsen 74'; Walberg 82'	Stadium: Varden Amfi; Attendance: 100; Referee: Jon Ophuus
	Penalties
	A. Andersen (penalty scored); Edvardsen (penalty scored); Dessalegn (penalty scored); El-Amrani (penalty scored); Brevig (penalty scored)		(penalty scored) Songve; (penalty missed) Aandahl; (penalty scored) Engeset; (penalty scored) Birkeland; (penalty scored) Aase

18 April 2013	Herd (4)	2–2 (a.e.t.) (1–4 p)	(2) Kristiansund	Ålesund
18:00 CEST (UTC+2)	Dalhus 43'; Solevåg 47'	Report	Psyché 75'; T. Edvardsen 86'	Stadium: Rollonbanen; Attendance: 200; Referee: Karl Fredrik Folge Røsok
	Penalties
	Kampenes (penalty missed); Ulvestad (penalty missed); Skirk (penalty scored)		(penalty scored) T. Edvardsen; (penalty scored) Økland; (penalty scored) Risholt; (penalty scored) Sivertsen

18 April 2013	Herkules (4)	0–3	(2) Sandefjord	Skien
18:00 CEST (UTC+2)		Report	Gulliksen 3'; Saaliti 33'; Torp 90'	Stadium: Herkules hovedbane Referee: Terje Rock Rønning

18 April 2013	Levanger (3)	1–0	(3) Mo	Levanger
18:00 CEST (UTC+2)	Skeie 8'	Report		Stadium: Moan Fritidspark; Attendance: 215; Referee: Mads Følstad Skarsem

18 April 2013	Raufoss (3)	5–4 (a.e.t.)	(4) Fjellhamar	Raufoss
18:00 CEST (UTC+2)	Kahn 5' (o.g.); Hadžimehmedović 37', 48', 107'; Senstad 104'	Report	Kahn 35'; Amundsen 45', 55'; Granheim 113'	Stadium: Raufoss Stadion; Referee: Bård Lindahl

18 April 2013	Tiller (4)	3–2	(3) Nardo	Trondheim
18:00 CEST (UTC+2)	Snekvik 11', 17', 45'	Report	Solem 25'; Skrede 84' (o.g.)	Stadium: Tonstad kunstgress Attendance: 50; Referee: Thomas Solum Lystad

18 April 2013	Træff (3)	3–1	(3) Skarbøvik	Molde
18:00 CEST (UTC+2)	Tomren 59'; Brandal 62', 77'	Report	Gjerde 70'	Stadium: Reknesbanen; Referee: Marius Hansen Grøtta

18 April 2013	Vindbjart (3)	3–3 (a.e.t.) (5–3 p)	(4) Donn	Vennesla
18:00 CEST (UTC+2)	Follerås 18', 89'; Kvaalen 29'	Report	Myhrstad 8'; Lund 19'; Lind 45'	Stadium: Mosseidmoen; Attendance: 50; Referee: Marius Lien

18 April 2013	Steinkjer (4)	0–7	(3) Strindheim	Steinkjer
19:00 CEST (UTC+2)		Report	Nerland 5'; Stokke 17'; Hegna 25'; Henriksen 39'; Moen 41', 58', 64'	Stadium: Guldbergaunet Stadion; Attendance: 90; Referee: Robert Eggen

== Second round ==
The 64 winners from the first round were scheduled to play in this round of the competition. The matches took place on 1 and 2 May 2013.

Number of teams per tier entering this round
Tippeligaen (1)	1. divisjon (2)	2. divisjon (3)	3. divisjon (4)	4. divisjon (5)	Total
16 / 16	16 / 16	27 / 56	5 / 164	0 / 314	64 / 566

1 May 2013	Strømmen (2)	2–3	(3) Alta	Strømmen
15:00 CEST (UTC+2)	Daly 19'; Fellus 24'	Report	Thomassen 52'; Richardsen 56'; Sega Ngom 83'	Stadium: Strømmen Stadion; Attendance: 278; Referee: Anders Karset Gjermshus

1 May 2013	Tiller (4)	3–4	(2) Ranheim	Trondheim
15:00 CEST (UTC+2)	Unhjem Jakobsen 7', 44'; Snekvik 80'	Report	Sondre Aas 3'; Krogstad 55'; Rønning 68'; Åsen 90+3'	Stadium: Tonstad kunstgress Attendance: 250; Referee: Rikhard Haugen Lyng

1 May 2013	Ull/Kisa (2)	2–0	(3) Tromsdalen	Jessheim
16:00 CEST (UTC+2)	Langås 13'; Dos Santos 24'	Report		Stadium: UKI Arena; Attendance: 170; Referee: Espen Eskås

1 May 2013	Kvik Halden (3)	1–0	(1) Sarpsborg 08	Halden
18:00 CEST (UTC+2)	Agim Shabani 83'	Report		Stadium: Halden Stadion; Attendance: 1,490; Referee: Bjørn Hansen

1 May 2013	Follo (2)	2–1 (a.e.t.)	(3) Bærum	Ski
18:00 CEST (UTC+2)	Markegård 76', 120+1'	Report	Pellegrino 37'	Stadium: Ski Stadion; Attendance: 305; Referee: Per Erik Haugen

1 May 2013	Kjelsås (3)	3–4	(2) Stabæk	Oslo
18:00 CEST (UTC+2)	Aoudia 41', 84'; Akinyemi 64'	Report	Stengel 47'; Sortevik 52'; Boli 54'; Stokkelien 69'	Stadium: Grefsen Stadion; Attendance: 503; Referee: Trygve Kjensli

1 May 2013	Ullern (4)	1–8	(1) Vålerenga	Oslo
18:00 CEST (UTC+2)	Berg 3'	Report	Samuel 7'; Børven 17', 26', 30', 70'; Calvo 41'; Zahid 45'; Benmoussa 63'	Stadium: Ullern Idrettsplass; Attendance: 2,702; Referee: Ola Hobber Nilsen

1 May 2013	Asker (3)	2–1	(1) Strømsgodset	Asker
18:00 CEST (UTC+2)	Sæthre 29'; Mohammadian 57'	Report	Vilsvik 61'	Stadium: Føyka Stadion; Attendance: 2,019; Referee: Martin Lundby

1 May 2013	Kongsvinger (2)	1–1 (a.e.t.) (5–3 p)	(3) Raufoss	Kongsvinger
18:00 CEST (UTC+2)	Ellingsen 36'	Report	Haug 17'	Stadium: Gjemselund Stadion; Attendance: 655; Referee: Tommy Frydenlund
	Penalties
	Myklebust (penalty scored); Shindika (penalty scored); Skogh (penalty scored); Christian Moltzau (penalty scored); Hæstad (penalty scored)		(penalty scored) Berg; (penalty scored) Rolandsen; (penalty missed) Qaka; (penalty scored) Hadžimehmedović

1 May 2013	Elverum (2)	1–0	(3) Nybergsund	Elverum
18:00 CEST (UTC+2)	Izuchukwu 45+2'	Report		Stadium: Sentralidrettsplassen; Attendance: 641; Referee: Omar Rafiq

1 May 2013	HamKam (2)	3–1	(3) KFUM Oslo	Hamar
18:00 CEST (UTC+2)	Dahle 18'; Jevne Hagen 28'; Gundersen 41'	Report	Rashid 89'	Stadium: Briskeby gressbane Attendance: 526; Referee: Bård Lindahl

1 May 2013	Birkebeineren (3)	1–1 (a.e.t.) (2–4 p)	(1) Hønefoss	Krokstadelva
18:00 CEST (UTC+2)	Avdimetaj 36'	Report	Riski 54'	Stadium: Årbogen Kunstgress; Attendance: 400; Referee: Richard Isaksen
	Penalties
	Ryghseter (penalty scored); Peyghambernejad (penalty missed); Celina (penalty scored); Torgersen (penalty missed); Ekholdt (penalty missed)		(penalty scored) Riski; (penalty scored) Vendelbo; (penalty scored) Solli; (penalty scored) Midtgarden

1 May 2013	Sandefjord (2)	2–0	(3) Tønsberg	Sandefjord
18:00 CEST (UTC+2)	Dieng 86'; Sellin 90+3'	Report		Stadium: Komplett.no Arena; Attendance: 809; Referee: Rohit Saggi

1 May 2013	Pors Grenland (3)	1–2 (a.e.t.)	(1) Odd	Porsgrunn
18:00 CEST (UTC+2)	Enger 48'	Report	Storbæk 66'; Fevang 120'	Stadium: Pors Stadion; Attendance: 2,393; Referee: Raymond Nyberg

1 May 2013	Fløy (3)	2–0	(1) Sandnes Ulf	Kristiansand
18:00 CEST (UTC+2)	Christian Andreasen 62', 67'	Report		Stadium: Flekkerøy Stadion; Attendance: 380; Referee: Espen Larsen

1 May 2013	Egersund (3)	2–3	(1) Start	Egersund
18:00 CEST (UTC+2)	Nyborg 9'; Gløpstad 62'	Report	Vilhjálmsson 40'; Hoff 76'; Kristjánsson 87'	Stadium: Idrettsparken; Attendance: 1,050; Referee: Jørn Voll

1 May 2013	Bryne (2)	3–0	(3) Vindbjart	Bryne
18:00 CEST (UTC+2)	Skartun 38'; Andersen 55'; Tveita 63'	Report		Stadium: Bryne Stadion; Attendance: 484; Referee: Cosmin Dima

1 May 2013	Vidar (3)	0–3	(1) Viking	Stavanger
18:00 CEST (UTC+2)		Report	Nisja 1'; Bjørdal 70' de Lanlay 88'	Stadium: Lassa Idrettspark; Attendance: 600; Referee: Ørjan Vikene

1 May 2013	Øystese (4)	1–6	(1) Brann	Øystese
18:00 CEST (UTC+2)	Skåre Thune 10'	Report	Finne 16', 87'; Pusić 17', 21', 52'; Huseklepp 79'	Stadium: Øystese idrettsplass Attendance: 1,900; Referee: Kai Erik Steen

1 May 2013	Nest-Sotra (3)	2–4	(1) Haugesund	Ågotnes
18:00 CEST (UTC+2)	Næss 18'; Lid Kleppe 74'	Report	Haraldseid 36'; Haukås 42'; Anyora 78'; Johansen 90+1'	Stadium: Ågotnes Stadion; Attendance: 300; Referee: Kristoffer Hagenes

1 May 2013	Åsane (3)	0–1	(2) Hødd	Åsane
18:00 CEST (UTC+2)		Report	Standal 5'	Stadium: Åsane Idrettspark; Attendance: 250; Referee: Steinar Hauge

1 May 2013	Florø (4)	0–5	(1) Aalesund	Florø
18:00 CEST (UTC+2)		Report	James 52', 80'; Ulvestad 65'; Myklebust 84'; Hamed Allah 86'	Stadium: Florø Stadion; Referee: Jon Ophuus

1 May 2013	Træff (3)	3–3 (a.e.t.) (4–5 p)	(1) Sogndal	Molde
18:00 CEST (UTC+2)	Engh 34'; Oltedal 47', 90+2'	Report	Flo 25'; Mane 31', 49'	Stadium: Reknesbanen; Attendance: 360; Referee: Sigurd Smehus Kringstad
	Penalties
	Håkon Sandnes (penalty scored); Kosberg (penalty missed); Rønningen (penalty scored); Flemmen (penalty scored); Fredriksen (penalty scored); Amundsgård (penalty missed); Leirvik (penalty missed)		(penalty missed) Mane; (penalty scored) Karadas; (penalty scored) Sagna; (penalty scored) Flo; (penalty scored) Valsvik; (penalty missed) Næss Lund; (penalty scored) Teniste

1 May 2013	Strindheim (3)	0–5	(1) Rosenborg	Trondheim
18:00 CEST (UTC+2)		Report	Nielsen 18', 73', 80'; Chibuike 33'; Midtsjø 52'	Stadium: Strindheim Kunstgress; Attendance: 1,100; Referee: Thomas Solum Lystad

1 May 2013	Harstad (3)	1–2 (a.e.t.)	(2) Bodø/Glimt	Harstad
18:00 CEST (UTC+2)	Willassen 43'	Report	Ndiaye 10'; Braaten 106'	Stadium: Harstad Stadion; Attendance: 544; Referee: Marius Jespersen

1 May 2013	Fløya (4)	2–3	(1) Tromsø	Tromsø
18:00 CEST (UTC+2)	Lekström 26' (o.g.); Hanssen 90'	Report	Prijović 12', 39'; Johnsen 18'	Stadium: Fløyabanen; Attendance: 842; Referee: Ole Martin Loe

2 May 2013	Levanger (3)	4–2 (a.e.t.)	(2) Kristiansund	Levanger
18:00 CEST (UTC+2)	Aboubacar 76'; Flakk 78'; Myrslo 94', 99'	Report	Ashby 6'; Aalbu 30'	Stadium: Moan Fritidspark; Attendance: 237; Referee: Kristian Aune

2 May 2013	Moss (3)	0–2	(2) Fredrikstad	Moss
18:00 CEST (UTC+2)		Report	Solberg 62'; Anier 90'	Stadium: Melløs Stadion; Attendance: 847; Referee: Christian Moen

2 May 2013	Mjøndalen (2)	2–1 (a.e.t.)	(3) Lyn	Mjøndalen
18:00 CEST (UTC+2)	Karlsen 17'; Ingebretsen 99'	Report	Rasmussen 90+2'	Stadium: Mjøndalen Stadion; Attendance: 751; Referee: Ole-Martin Loeshagen

2 May 2013	Vard Haugesund (2)	1–0	(3) Fyllingsdalen	Haugesund
18:00 CEST (UTC+2)	Myhre 90+2'	Report		Stadium: Haugesund Stadion; Attendance: 223; Referee: Ole Gya

2 May 2013	Byåsen (3)	1–5	(1) Molde	Trondheim
18:00 CEST (UTC+2)	Alseth 61'	Report	Hussain 6'; Karlsen 13' (o.g.); Linnes 38'; Chima 57'; Agnaldo 85'	Stadium: Byåsen Arena; Attendance: 926; Referee: Kjetil Thorsø Hansen

2 May 2013	Grorud (3)	2–4 (a.e.t.)	(1) Lillestrøm	Oslo
18:00 CEST (UTC+2)	Hatlén 53'; Jensen 65'	Report	Riise 19'; Andersson 42'; Moen 117', 119'	Stadium: Grorud Matchbane; Attendance: 1,000; Referee: Mads Ahlsen

== Third round ==
The 32 winners from the Second round were scheduled to play in this round of the competition. The matches took place on 29 and 30 May 2013.

Number of teams per tier entering this round
Tippeligaen (1)	1. divisjon (2)	2. divisjon (3)	3. divisjon (4)	4. divisjon (5)	Total
14 / 16	13 / 16	5 / 56	0 / 164	0 / 314	32 / 566

29 May 2013	Bodø/Glimt (2)	2–0	(2) Elverum	Bodø
17:00 CEST (UTC+2)	Laajab 25'; Ndiaye 90+2'	Report		Stadium: Aspmyra Stadion; Attendance: 781; Referee: Mads Ahlsen

29 May 2013	Alta (3)	2–1	(1) Hønefoss	Alta
18:00 CEST (UTC+2)	Ngom 2'; Balto 86'	Report	Aðalsteinsson 87'	Stadium: Finnmarkshallen; Attendance: 561; Referee: Trygve Kjensli

29 May 2013	Asker (3)	2–3	(1) Vålerenga	Asker
18:00 CEST (UTC+2)	Sistek 53'; Ajeti 81'	Report	Calvo 24', 55'; Børven 34'	Stadium: Føyka Stadion; Attendance: 2,356; Referee: Martin Sleire Lundby

29 May 2013	Brann (1)	1–2	(2) Mjøndalen	Bergen
18:00 CEST (UTC+2)	Pusic 14'	Report	Kirkevold 50', 52'	Stadium: Brann Stadion; Attendance: 2,399; Referee: Ole Gya

29 May 2013	Hødd (2)	2–2 (a.e.t.) (4–5 p)	(1) Molde	Ulsteinvik
18:00 CEST (UTC+2)	Sandal 38'; Latifu 120'	Report	Eikrem 90+4'; Hovland 112'	Stadium: Høddvoll Stadion; Attendance: 3,415; Referee: Tommy Skjerven
	Penalties
	Latifu (penalty scored); Nilsen (penalty scored); Heltne (penalty scored); Aursnes (penalty scored); Rekdal (penalty missed); Grodås (penalty missed); Magnussen (penalty missed)		(penalty scored) Hovland; (penalty scored) Ekpo; (penalty scored) Agnaldo; (penalty scored) Tripic; (penalty missed) Eikrem; (penalty missed) Rindarøy; (penalty scored) Chima

29 May 2013	Kvik Halden (3)	0–2	(1) Lillestrøm	Halden
18:00 CEST (UTC+2)		Report	Moen 55'; Østli 82'	Stadium: Halden Stadion; Attendance: 1,005; Referee: Espen Eskås

29 May 2013	Levanger (3)	1–4	(1) Rosenborg	Levanger
18:00 CEST (UTC+2)	Myrslo 90+1'	Report	Mikkelsen 4'; Midtsjø 20'; Nielsen 37'; Selnæs 81'	Stadium: Moan Fritidspark; Attendance: 4,630; Referee: Dag Vidar Hafsås

29 May 2013	Odd (1)	2–0	(1) Sandefjord	Skien
18:00 CEST (UTC+2)	Johnsen 17'; Krogsgård 68'	Report		Stadium: Skagerak Arena; Attendance: 2,973; Referee: Ola Hobber Nilsen

29 May 2013	Ranheim (2)	4–2 (a.e.t.)	(1) Aalesund	Ranheim
18:00 CEST (UTC+2)	Krogstad 17'; Aas 28', 113', 117'	Report	James 21'; Martinussen 77'	Stadium: DNB Arena; Attendance: 1,285; Referee: Per Ivar Staberg

29 May 2013	Sogndal (1)	4–3	(2) Ull/Kisa	Sogndalsfjøra
18:00 CEST (UTC+2)	Mane 25', 83'; Flo 46'; Stamnestrø 78'	Report	Giæver 11', 77'; Dos Santos 89'	Stadium: Fosshaugane Campus; Attendance: 420; Referee: Kristoffer Helgerud

29 May 2013	Tromsø (1)	3–1	(2) Follo	Tromsø
18:00 CEST (UTC+2)	Fojut 7'; Andersen 67'; Johansen 75'	Report	Hagen 90+2'	Stadium: Alfheim Stadion; Attendance: 1,057; Referee: Kjetil Thorsø Hansen

29 May 2013	Vard Haugesund (2)	2–5	(1) Haugesund	Haugesund
18:00 CEST (UTC+2)	Kapidžić 52'; Miljeteig 90+2'	Report	Gytkjær 7', 31', 60'; Engblom 59', 70'	Stadium: Haugesund Stadion; Attendance: 1,991; Referee: Trond Ivar Døvle

29 May 2013	Viking (1)	2–4	(2) Bryne	Stavanger
18:00 CEST (UTC+2)	Edmundsson 67'; Bjørdal 67'	Report	Khalili 17'; Skartun 43', 83'; Andersen 60'	Stadium: Viking Stadion; Attendance: 5,422; Referee: Tom Harald Hagen

30 May 2013	Fløy (3)	1–2	(1) Start	Kristiansand
18:00 CEST (UTC+2)	Dreshaj 27'	Report	Castro 3'; Vilhjálmsson 83'	Stadium: Flekkerøy Stadion; Attendance: 2,500; Referee: Tore Hansen

30 May 2013	Kongsvinger (2)	0–1	(2) HamKam	Kongsvinger
18:00 CEST (UTC+2)		Report	Asani 66'	Stadium: Gjemselund Stadion; Attendance: 1,300; Referee: Omar Rafiq

30 May 2013	Stabæk (2)	3–1	(2) Fredrikstad	Nadderud
18:00 CEST (UTC+2)	Brustad 56', 64'; Stokkelien 90'	Report	Solberg 35'	Stadium: Nadderud Stadion; Attendance: 922; Referee: Brage Sandmoen

== Fourth round ==
The 16 winners from the Third round were scheduled to play in this round of the competition. The matches took place on 19 and 26 June 2013.

Number of teams per tier entering this round
Tippeligaen (1)	1. divisjon (2)	2. divisjon (3)	3. divisjon (4)	4. divisjon (5)	Total
10 / 16	5 / 16	1 / 56	0 / 164	0 / 314	16 / 566

19 June 2013	Start (1)	2–1	(2) Stabæk	Kristiansand
18:00 CEST (UTC+2)	Acosta 32'; Jalasto 60' (o.g.)	Report	Brustad 37'	Stadium: Sør Arena; Attendance: 2,150; Referee: Svein Oddvar Moen

19 June 2013	Lillestrøm (1)	2–0	(2) Bryne	Lillestrøm
18:00 CEST (UTC+2)	Moen 100'; Fofana 118'	Report		Stadium: Åråsen Stadion; Attendance: 1,712; Referee: Kjetil Sælen

19 June 2013	Molde (1)	6–0	(2) Ranheim	Molde
18:00 CEST (UTC+2)	Agnaldo 5'; Gatt 17'; Simonsen 27'; Olsen 49' (o.g.); Ekpo 50'; Chima 80'	Report		Stadium: Aker Stadion; Attendance: 4,380; Referee: Ken Henry Johnsen

19 June 2013	Bodø/Glimt (1)	2–1	(1) Odd	Bodø
18:00 CEST (UTC+2)	Johansen 75'; Laajab 79'	Report	Rashani 56'	Stadium: Aspmyra Stadion; Attendance: 2,379; Referee: Tom Harald Hagen

19 June 2013	Haugesund (1)	4–3	(3) Alta	Haugesund
18:00 CEST (UTC+2)	Andreassen 12', 61'; Engblom 55', 57'	Report	Thomassen 37'; Nikolaisen 51'; Ngom 65'	Stadium: Haugesund Stadion; Attendance: 2,483; Referee: Tommy Skjerven

19 June 2013	Rosenborg (1)	2–1	(1) Tromsø	Trondheim
18:00 CEST (UTC+2)	Jensen 23', 61'	Report	Ondrášek 63'	Stadium: Lerkendal Stadion; Attendance: 5,577; Referee: Per Ivar Staberg

19 June 2013	Mjøndalen (2)	3–2	(2) HamKam	Mjøndalen
18:00 CEST (UTC+2)	Solberg 19'; Kirkevold 65'; Gauseth 72'	Report	Dahle 23', 33'	Stadium: Mjøndalen Stadion; Attendance: 1,020; Referee: Trond Ivar Døvle

26 June 2013	Vålerenga (1)	3–1	(1) Sogndal	Oslo
18:00 CEST (UTC+2)	Børven 17'; Holm 72'; Abdellaoue 90+4'	Report	Holsæter 78'	Stadium: Ullevaal Stadion; Attendance: 2,040; Referee: Espen Berntsen

== Quarter-finals ==
The 8 winners from the Fourth Round were scheduled to play in this round of the competition. The matches took place on 3, 4 July and 21 August 2013.

Number of teams per tier entering this round
Tippeligaen (1)	1. divisjon (2)	2. divisjon (3)	3. divisjon (4)	4. divisjon (5)	Total
6 / 16	2 / 16	0 / 56	0 / 164	0 / 314	8 / 566

3 July 2013	Haugesund (1)	1–1 (a.e.t.) (5–3 p)	(2) Bodø/Glimt	Haugesund
18:00 CEST (UTC+2)	Ndiaye 8'	Report	Johansen 90'	Stadium: Haugesund Stadion; Attendance: 3,390; Referee: Ken Henry Johnsen
	Penalties
	Sema (penalty scored); Bangura (penalty scored); Mæland (penalty scored); Engblom (penalty scored); Kristiansen (penalty scored)		(penalty scored) Johansen; (penalty scored) V. Braaten; (penalty missed) T. Braaten; (penalty scored) Ndiaye

3 July 2013	Molde (1)	2–0	(2) Mjøndalen	Molde
19:35 CEST (UTC+2)	Hovland 49'; Tripic 82'	Report		Stadium: Aker Stadion; Attendance: 5,009; Referee: Brage Sandmoen

4 July 2013	Start (1)	0–1	(1) Lillestrøm	Kristiansand
19:00 CEST (UTC+2)		Report	Pálmason 71'	Stadium: Sør Arena; Attendance: 4,135; Referee: Dag Vidar Hafsås

21 August 2013	Rosenborg (1)	2–1	(1) Vålerenga	Trondheim
18:30 CEST (UTC+2)	Søderlund 78'; Bille Nielsen 90'	Report	Børven 87'	Stadium: Lerkendal Stadion; Attendance: 7,680; Referee: Tore Hansen

== Semi-finals ==
The 4 winners from the Quarter-finals were scheduled to play in this round of the competition. The matches took place on 25 and 26 September 2013.

Number of teams per tier entering this round
Tippeligaen (1)	1. divisjon (2)	2. divisjon (3)	3. divisjon (4)	4. divisjon (5)	Total
4 / 16	0 / 16	0 / 56	0 / 164	0 / 314	4 / 566

25 September 2013	Rosenborg (1)	2–1	(1) Haugesund	Trondheim
20:00 CEST (UTC+2)	Mikkelsen 35'; Bille Nielsen 58'	Report	Gytkjær 48'	Stadium: Lerkendal Stadion; Attendance: 8,738; Referee: Brage Sandmoen

26 September 2013	Lillestrøm (1)	2–2 (a.e.t.) (4–5 p)	(1) Molde	Lillestrøm
20:00 CEST (UTC+2)	Pálmason 30'; Østli 56'	Report	Hoseth 34', 90+1'	Stadium: Åråsen Stadion; Attendance: 6,480; Referee: Tom Harald Hagen
	Penalties
	Moen (penalty scored); Riise (penalty scored); Helstad (penalty scored); Kippe (penalty scored); Piermayr (penalty missed)		(penalty scored) Hoseth; (penalty scored) Forren; (penalty scored) Hovland; (penalty scored) Høiland; (penalty scored) Hussain

== Final ==
The 2013 Norwegian Football Cup final was played between Rosenborg and Molde at Ullevaal Stadion in Oslo on 24 November 2013.

24 November 2013
13:15 CET (UTC+1)

Rosenborg	2–4	Molde
Diskerud 17'; Reginiussen 49'	Report	Rindarøy 16'; Berget 71'; Hoseth 82'; Høiland 90'

Ullevaal Stadion, Oslo
Attendance: 24,824
Referee: Svein Oddvar Moen (Haugar)

== Statistics ==
=== Top goalscorers ===
Rank	Player	Club	Goals	Games
1	(Denmark) Nicki Bille Nielsen	Rosenborg	8	7
2	(Norway) Torgeir Børven	Vålerenga	7	4
3	(Norway) Bård Finne	Brann	6	2
4	(Norway) Mads Stokkelien	Stabæk	5	3
4	(Cape Verde) Steevan Dos Santos	Ull/Kisa	5	3
6	(Senegal) Aliou Coly	Molde	4	1
6	(Morocco) Abderrazak Hamed Allah	Aalesunds FK	4	3
6	(Norway) Asgeir Snekvik	Tiller	4	2
