= 2013 Viking FK season =

Viking
2013 season
- Chairman: Christian Rugland
- Manager: Kjell Jonevret
- Stadium: Viking Stadion
- Tippeligaen: 5th
- Norwegian Cup: Third Round vs Bryne
- Top goalscorer: League: Trond Olsen (9); All: Trond Olsen (9)
- Highest home attendance: 13,218 vs Sandnes Ulf; 5 October 2013
- Lowest home attendance: 5,422 vs Bryne; 29 May 2013
- Average home league attendance: 9,980
Home colours	Away colours

The 2013 season was Viking's first full season with Kjell Jonevret as manager. They finished 5th in the Tippeligaen and were knocked out of the cup by Adeccoligaen side Bryne in the Third Round.

== Squad ==
Note: Flags indicate national team as defined under FIFA eligibility rules; some limited exceptions apply. Players may hold more than one non-FIFA nationality.

No.	Pos.	Nation	Player
1	GK	NOR	Rune Jarstein
2	DF	NOR	Trond Erik Bertelsen
3	DF	NOR	Johan Lædre Bjørdal
5	DF	COD	Richard Ekunde
6	DF	NOR	Håkon Skogseid
8	MF	NOR	Vidar Nisja
9	FW	SWE	Patrik Ingelsten
10	FW	NOR	Veton Berisha
11	FW	FRO	Jóan Símun Edmundsson
13	MF	NOR	Christian Landu Landu
14	MF	NOR	André Danielsen (Vice captain)
15	MF	SEN	Makhtar Thioune

No.	Pos.	Nation	Player
16	FW	NOR	Yann-Erik de Lanlay
17	FW	ISL	Jón Daði Böðvarsson
18	FW	NGR	Osita Henry Chikere
19	MF	GHA	King Gyan
20	DF	ISL	Indriði Sigurðsson (Captain)
22	GK	NOR	Christoffer Midbøe Lunde
23	FW	AUT	Benjamin Sulimani
24	GK	NOR	Pål Vestly Heigre
25	MF	NOR	Eirik Schulze
27	FW	NOR	Trond Olsen
28	DF	NOR	Kristoffer Haugen
29	DF	NOR	Viljar Vevatne

=== On Loan ===
Note: Flags indicate national team as defined under FIFA eligibility rules; some limited exceptions apply. Players may hold more than one non-FIFA nationality.

No. / Pos. / Nation / Player; 21 / FW / EST / Henri Anier (at Motherwell)	No. / Pos. / Nation / Player

== Transfers ==
=== Winter ===
In: Note: Flags indicate national team as defined under FIFA eligibility rules; some limited exceptions apply. Players may hold more than one non-FIFA nationality.

No.	Pos.	Nation	Player
5	DF	COD	Richard Ekunde (from (Sweden) GAIS)
11	FW	FRO	Jóan Símun Edmundsson (loan return from (Denmark) Fredericia)
12	GK	NOR	Arild Østbø (loan return from (Norway) Start)
17	FW	NOR	Eirik Jakobsen (loan return from (Norway) Bryne)
17	FW	ISL	Jón Daði Böðvarsson (from (Iceland) Selfoss)
22	GK	NOR	Christoffer Midbøe Lunde (from (Norway) Vidar)

Out: Note: Flags indicate national team as defined under FIFA eligibility rules; some limited exceptions apply. Players may hold more than one non-FIFA nationality.

No.	Pos.	Nation	Player
4	DF	SWE	Björn Andersson (to (Sweden) GAIS)
10	FW	NOR	Erik Nevland (Retired)
12	GK	NOR	Arild Østbø (loan to (Norway) Strømmen)
17	FW	NOR	Eirik Jakobsen (to (Norway) Bryne)
18	MF	NOR	Jon-Helge Tveita (loan to (Norway) Bryne)

=== Summer ===
In: Note: Flags indicate national team as defined under FIFA eligibility rules; some limited exceptions apply. Players may hold more than one non-FIFA nationality.

No.	Pos.	Nation	Player
23	FW	AUT	Benjamin Sulimani (from (Austria) Admira Wacker)

Out: Note: Flags indicate national team as defined under FIFA eligibility rules; some limited exceptions apply. Players may hold more than one non-FIFA nationality.

No.	Pos.	Nation	Player
7	MF	DEN	Martin Ørnskov (to (Denmark) Brøndby)
21	FW	EST	Henri Anier (loan to (Scotland) Motherwell)

== Competitions ==
=== Tippeligaen ===
==== Table ====
Pos	Team	Pld	W	D	L	GF	GA	GD	Pts	Qualification or relegation
3	Haugesund	30	15	6	9	41	39	+2	51	Qualification for the Europa League first qualifying round
4	Aalesund	30	14	7	9	55	44	+11	49	
5	Viking	30	12	10	8	41	36	+5	46	
6	Molde	30	12	8	10	47	38	+9	44	Qualification for the Europa League second qualifying round (Note: Molde qualified for the second qualifying round of the UEFA Europa League as winners of the 2013 Norwegian Cup.)
7	Odd	30	11	7	12	43	39	+4	40	

Source: fotball.no
Rules for classification: 1) points; 2) goal difference; 3) number of goals scored.

==== Results summary ====
Overall								Home						Away					
Pld	W	D	L	GF	GA	GD	Pts	W	D	L	GF	GA	GD	W	D	L	GF	GA	GD
30	12	10	8	41	36	+5	46	9	5	1	23	12	+11	3	5	7	18	24	−6

==== Results by round ====
Round	1	2	3	4	5	6	7	8	9	10	11	12	13	14	15	16	17	18	19	20	21	22	23	24	25	26	27	28	29	30
Ground	H	A	A	A	A	H	A	H	A	H	A	H	A	H	A	A	H	H	A	H	A	H	A	H	A	H	A	H	A	H
Result	W	L	W	W	L	W	L	D	W	D	W	W	L	D	D	D	W	D	D	W	L	W	D	W	D	D	L	L	L	W
Position	5	8	3	3	5	3	3	6	4	6	4	3	4	5	4	5	3	4	4	4	5	4	4	3	3	3	4	6	6	5

Updated to match(es) played on 3 November 2013. Source: see below
A = Away; H = Home; W = Win; D = Draw; L = Loss

==== Matches ====
16 March 2013 1	Viking	2–1	Molde	Stavanger
19:00 CET (UTC+1)	Berisha 31'; Olsen 57'	Summary	Moström 10'	Stadium: Viking Stadion; Attendance: 9,059; Referee: Tommy Skjerven

1 April 2013 2	Sarpsborg 08	2–1	Viking	Sarpsborg
CEST (UTC+2)	Brink 42'; Wiig 55'	Summary	Böðvarsson 52'	Stadium: Sarpsborg Stadion; Attendance: 4,562; Referee: Per Ivar Staberg

7 April 2013 3	Lillestrøm	0–1	Viking	Lillestrøm
18:00 CEST (UTC+2)		Summary	Bjørdal 44'	Stadium: Åråsen Stadion; Attendance: 4,856; Referee: Dag Vidar Hafsås

14 April 2013 4	Viking	1–0	Odd	Stavanger
18:00 CEST (UTC+2)	Berisha 23'	Summary		Stadium: Viking Stadion; Attendance: 8,525; Referee: Tore Hansen

20 April 2013 5	Brann	2–0	Viking	Bergen
18:00 CEST (UTC+2)	Huseklepp 3'; Nordkvelle 19'	Summary		Stadium: Brann Stadion; Attendance: 11,458; Referee: Svein Erik Edvartsen

28 April 2013 6	Viking	4–1	Sogndal	Stavanger
15:30 CEST (UTC+2)	de Lanlay 5'; Ingelsten 10'; Olsen 90', 90'	Summary	Karadas 56'	Stadium: Viking Stadion; Attendance: 8,823; Referee: Per Staberg

5 May 2013 7	Strømsgodset	3–1	Viking	Drammen
18:00 CEST (UTC+2)	Vilsvik 10'; Keita 45'; Diomande 72'	Summary	Ingelsten 48' (pen.)	Stadium: Marienlyst Stadion; Attendance: 6,934; Referee: Tom Harald Hagen

9 May 2013 8	Viking	0–0	Haugesund	Stavanger
15:30 CEST (UTC+2)		Summary		Stadium: Viking Stadion; Attendance: 12,024; Referee: Trond Ivar Døvle

12 May 2013 9	Start	1–2	Viking	Kristiansand
19:00 CEST (UTC+2)	Hoff 26'	Summary	Olsen 45'; Sarr 90+2'	Stadium: Sør Arena; Attendance: 6,360; Referee: Ken Henry Johnsen

16 May 2013 10	Viking	0–0	Hønefoss	Stavanger
18:00 CEST (UTC+2)		Summary		Stadium: Viking Stadion; Attendance: 11,742; Referee: Tore Hansen

21 May 2013 11	Sandnes Ulf	0–1	Viking	Sandnes
19:00 CEST (UTC+2)		Summary	Danielsen 54'	Stadium: Sandnes Idrettspark; Attendance: 4,969; Referee: Svein Oddvar Moen

26 May 2013 12	Viking	2–1	Tromsø	Stavanger
18:00 CEST (UTC+2)	de Lanlay 25'; Olsen 90'	Summary	Jenssen 77'	Stadium: Viking Stadion; Attendance: 9,473; Referee: Ola Hobber Nilsen

23 June 2013 13	Aalesund	2–1	Viking	Ålesund
18:00 CEST (UTC+2)	James 20'; Fuhre 57'	Summary	Edmundsson (yellow card) 69'; Ingelsten 90+1'	Stadium: Color Line Stadion; Attendance: 7,256; Referee: Per Ivar Staberg

30 June 2013 14	Viking	0–0	Rosenborg	Stavanger
18:00 CEST (UTC+2)		Summary		Stadium: Viking Stadion; Attendance: 9,958; Referee: Brage Sandmoen

7 July 2013 15	Vålerenga	2–2	Viking	Oslo
19:00 CEST (UTC+2)	Børven 48'; Kongshavn 90+5'	Summary	Berisha 28'; Ingelsten 55'	Stadium: Ullevaal Stadion; Attendance: 8,621; Referee: Ken Henry Johnsen

13 July 2012 16	Molde	1–1	Viking	Molde
15:30 CEST (UTC+2)	Coly (yellow card) 39'; Toivio 82'	Summary	Olsen 30'	Stadium: Aker Stadion; Attendance: 9,840; Referee: Tore Hansen

28 July 2013 17	Viking	3–0	Start	Stavanger
19:00 CEST (UTC+2)	Sigurðsson 6'; Bjørdal 44'; Sulimani 70'	Summary		Stadium: Viking Stadion; Attendance: 9,534; Referee: Kjetil Sælen

3 August 2013 18	Viking	2–2	Lillestrøm	Stavanger
18:00 CEST (UTC+2)	Sulimani 56'; Ingelsten 72'	Summary	Knudtzon 29'; Pálmason 48'	Stadium: Viking Stadion; Attendance: 8,962; Referee: Brage Sandmoen

11 August 2013 19	Odd	1–1	Viking	Skien
18:00 CEST (UTC+2)	Berge 90+3'	Summary	Sulimani 62'	Stadium: Skagerak Arena; Attendance: 5,068; Referee: Ola Hobber Nilsen

18 August 2013 20	Viking	3–2	Brann	Stavanger
19:00 CEST (UTC+2)	Sulimani 27'; Thioune 59'; Olsen 68'	Summary	Pusic 9'; Mojsov 21'	Stadium: Viking Stadion; Attendance: 13,064; Referee: Per Ivar Staberg

24 August 2013 21	Sogndal	1–0	Viking	Sogndalsfjøra
15:30 CEST (UTC+2)	Bolseth 81'	Summary		Stadium: Fosshaugane Campus; Attendance: 3,867; Referee: Ken Henry Johnsen

1 September 2013 22	Viking	1–0	Strømsgodset	Stavanger
18:00 CEST (UTC+2)	Gyan 71'	Summary	Johansen (red card) 90+1'	Stadium: Viking Stadion; Attendance: 10,105; Referee: Tommy Skjerven

14 September 2013 23	Haugesund	1–1	Viking	Haugesund
18:00 CEST (UTC+2)	Gyan 7' (o.g.)	Summary	Skogseid 50'	Stadium: Haugesund Stadion; Attendance: 5,540; Referee: Trond Ivar Døvle

22 September 2013 24	Viking	1–0	Vålerenga	Stavanger
19:00 CEST (UTC+2)	Danielsen 2'	Summary		Stadium: Viking Stadion; Attendance: 10,643; Referee: Dag Vidar Hafsås

28 September 2013 25	Hønefoss	2–2	Viking	Hønefoss
15:30 CEST (UTC+2)	K.Sigurdsson 82'; Hovda 90+2'	Summary	I.Sigurðsson 36'; Ingelsten 59' (pen.)	Stadium: Aka Arena; Attendance: 2,638; Referee: Trond Ivar Døvle

5 October 2013 26	Viking	1–1	Sandnes Ulf	Stavanger
15:30 CEST (UTC+2)	Ingelsten 78' (pen.)	Summary	Skjølsvik 69'	Stadium: Viking Stadion; Attendance: 13,218; Referee: Svein Oddvar Moen

19 October 2013 27	Tromsø	4–3	Viking	Tromsø
15:30 CEST (UTC+2)	Andersen 11'; Moldskred 19'; Ondrášek 72'; Fojut 82'	Summary	Olsen 48'; Gyan 53'; Berisha 64'	Stadium: Alfheim Stadion; Attendance: 4,551; Referee: Per Ivar Staberg

27 October 2013 28	Viking	1–3	Aalesund	Stavanger
19:00 CEST (UTC+2)	Sigurðsson 67'	Summary	Hamdallah 24', 51', 53'	Stadium: Viking Stadion; Attendance: 9,604; Referee: Ken Henry Johnsen

3 November 2013 29	Rosenborg	2–1	Viking	Trondheim
18:00 CET (UTC+1)	Søderlund 9'; Mikkelsen (yellow card) 43' (goal) 57'; Bille Nielsen (yellow card) 90+4'	Summary	Olsen 68' (yellow card) 77'	Stadium: Lerkendal Stadion; Attendance: 15,392; Referee: Tore Hansen

10 November 2013 30	Viking	2–1	Sarpsborg 08	Stavanger
18:00 CET (UTC+1)	Sulimani 90'; Nisja 90+4'	Summary	Valdimarsson 77'	Stadium: Viking Stadion; Attendance: 9,529; Referee: Trygve Kjensli

=== Norwegian Cup ===
17 April 2013 First round	Vaulen	0–4	Viking	Vaulen
18:00 CEST (UTC+2)		Report	Gyan 9'; Böðvarsson 20'; Thioune 40'; Haugen 78'	Stadium: Vaulenbanen; Attendance: 503; Referee: Ole Gya

1 May 2013 Second round	Vidar	0–3	Viking	Stavanger
18:00 CEST (UTC+2)		Report	Nisja 1'; Bjørdal 70' de Lanlay 88'	Stadium: Lassa Idrettspark; Attendance: 600; Referee: Ørjan Vikene

29 May 2013 Third round	Viking	2–4	Bryne	Stavanger
18:00 CEST (UTC+2)	Edmundsson 67'; Bjørdal 67'	Report	Khalili 17'; Skartun 43', 83'; Andersen 60'	Stadium: Viking Stadion; Attendance: 5,422; Referee: Tom Harald Hagen

== Squad statistics ==
As of 11 November 2013

=== Appearances and goals ===
No.	Pos	Nat	Player	Total		Tippeligaen		Norwegian Cup	
No.	Pos	Nat	Player	Apps	Goals	Apps	Goals	Apps	Goals
1	GK	(Norway) NOR	Rune Jarstein	31	0	30+0	0	1+0	0
2	DF	(Norway) NOR	Trond Erik Bertelsen	31	0	28+0	0	3+0	0
3	DF	(Norway) NOR	Johan Lædre Bjørdal	32	4	30+0	2	2+0	2
5	DF	(Democratic Republic of the Congo) COD	Richard Ekunde	3	0	1+0	0	1+1	0
6	DF	(Norway) NOR	Håkon Skogseid	31	1	26+2	1	3+0	0
8	MF	(Norway) NOR	Vidar Nisja	22	2	7+14	1	1+0	1
9	FW	(Sweden) SWE	Patrik Ingelsten	28	7	22+5	7	1+0	0
10	FW	(Norway) NOR	Veton Berisha	23	4	15+7	4	1+0	0
11	FW	(Faroe Islands) FRO	Jóan Símun Edmundsson	7	1	1+5	0	0+1	1
13	MF	(Norway) NOR	Christian Landu Landu	27	0	12+12	0	2+1	0
14	MF	(Norway) NOR	André Danielsen	20	2	15+2	2	3+0	0
15	MF	(Senegal) SEN	Makhtar Thioune	21	2	17+2	1	2+0	1
16	FW	(Norway) NOR	Yann-Erik de Lanlay	25	3	22+1	2	2+0	1
17	FW	(Iceland) ISL	Jón Daði Böðvarsson	25	2	8+15	1	2+0	1
18	FW	(Nigeria) NGR	Osita Henry Chikere	3	0	0+3	0	0+0	0
19	MF	(Ghana) GHA	King Gyan	27	3	14+11	2	2+0	1
20	DF	(Iceland) ISL	Indriði Sigurðsson	31	3	29+0	3	1+1	0
22	GK	(Norway) NOR	Christoffer Midbøe Lunde	2	0	0+0	0	2+0	0
23	FW	(Austria) AUT	Benjamin Sulimani	13	5	9+4	5	0+0	0
25	MF	(Norway) NOR	Eirik Schulze	4	0	0+2	0	0+2	0
27	FW	(Norway) NOR	Trond Olsen	32	9	26+3	9	3+0	0
28	MF	(Norway) NOR	Kristoffer Haugen	4	0	0+2	0	0+2	0
Players away from Viking on loan:
Players who left Viking during the season:
7	MF	(Denmark) DEN	Martin Ørnskov	18	0	16+0	0	1+1	0

=== Goal scorers ===
Place	Position	Nation	Number	Name	Tippeligaen	Norwegian Cup	Total
1	FW	(Norway)	27	Trond Olsen	9	0	9
2	FW	(Sweden)	9	Patrik Ingelsten	7	0	7
3	FW	(Austria)	23	Benjamin Sulimani	5	0	5
4	FW	(Norway)	10	Veton Berisha	4	0	4
4	DF	(Norway)	3	Johan Lædre Bjørdal	2	2	4
6	DF	(Iceland)	20	Indriði Sigurðsson	3	0	3
6	FW	(Norway)	16	Yann-Erik de Lanlay	2	1	3
6	MF	(Ghana)	19	King Gyan	2	1	3
9	MF	(Norway)	14	André Danielsen	2	0	2
9	FW	(Iceland)	17	Jón Daði Böðvarsson	1	1	2
9	MF	(Senegal)	15	Makhtar Thioune	1	1	2
9	MF	(Norway)	8	Vidar Nisja	1	1	2
13	DF	(Norway)	6	Håkon Skogseid	1	0	1
13				Own goal	1	0	1
13	MF	(Norway)	28	Kristoffer Haugen	0	1	1
13	FW	(Faroe Islands)	11	Jóan Símun Edmundsson	0	1	1
				TOTALS	41	9	50

=== Disciplinary record ===
Number	Nation	Position	Name	Tippeligaen		Norwegian Cup		Total	
Number	Nation	Position	Name	Yellow card	Red card	Yellow card	Red card	Yellow card	Red card
1	(Norway)	GK	Rune Jarstein	1	0	0	0	1	0
2	(Norway)	DF	Trond Erik Bertelsen	1	0	1	0	2	0
3	(Norway)	DF	Johan Lædre Bjørdal	2	0	0	0	2	0
6	(Norway)	DF	Håkon Skogseid	2	0	0	0	2	0
7	(Denmark)	MF	Martin Ørnskov	2	0	0	0	2	0
10	(Norway)	FW	Veton Berisha	2	0	0	0	2	0
11	(Faroe Islands)	FW	Jóan Símun Edmundsson	1	0	0	0	1	0
13	(Norway)	MF	Christian Landu Landu	2	0	0	0	2	0
14	(Norway)	MF	André Danielsen	5	0	1	0	6	0
15	(Senegal)	MF	Makhtar Thioune	4	0	0	0	4	0
16	(Norway)	FW	Yann-Erik de Lanlay	1	0	0	0	1	0
19	(Ghana)	MF	King Gyan	3	0	0	0	3	0
20	(Iceland)	DF	Indriði Sigurðsson	4	0	0	0	4	0
23	(Austria)	FW	Benjamin Sulimani	1	0	0	0	1	0
27	(Norway)	FW	Trond Olsen	2	0	0	0	2	0
			TOTALS	33	0	2	0	35	0
