= 2016 Norwegian Second Division =

2. divisjon
- Season: 2016
- Champions: Tromsdalen, Elverum, Florø, Arendal
- Top goalscorer: Endre Kupen (26 goals)

The 2016 2. divisjon (referred to as PostNord-ligaen for sponsorship reasons) was a Norwegian football third-tier league season. The league consisted of 56 teams divided into 4 groups of 14 teams.

In February 2016 it was announced a change in format, starting in the 2017 season, that would reduce the number of groups from four to two. Therefore, the winners of the four groups were promoted to the 1. divisjon, while the bottom seven teams in each group were relegated to the 3. divisjon.

The league was played as a double round-robin tournament, where all teams played 26 matches. The first round was played on 9 April 2016, while the last round was played on 22 October 2016.

== League tables ==
=== Group 1 ===
Pos	Team	Pld	W	D	L	GF	GA	GD	Pts	Promotion or relegation
1	Tromsdalen (P)	26	21	4	1	71	19	+52	67	Promotion to First Division
2	Finnsnes	26	16	8	2	52	22	+30	56	
3	Skeid	26	15	7	4	57	29	+28	52	
4	Grorud	26	15	6	5	63	39	+24	51	
5	Follo	26	12	5	9	48	39	+9	41	
6	Kjelsås	26	11	8	7	38	34	+4	41	
7	Alta	26	12	4	10	58	44	+14	40	
8	Harstad (R)	26	8	7	11	45	51	−6	31	Relegation to Third Division
9	Senja (R)	26	7	8	11	34	41	−7	29	Relegation to Third Division
10	Oppsal (R)	26	8	5	13	36	53	−17	29	Relegation to Third Division
11	Stabæk 2 (R)	26	7	4	15	37	54	−17	25	Relegation to Third Division
12	Ullern (R)	26	4	6	16	28	51	−23	18	Relegation to Third Division
13	Tromsø 2 (R)	26	5	3	18	40	68	−28	18	Relegation to Third Division
14	Mo (R)	26	3	1	22	31	94	−63	10	Relegation to Third Division

Source: nifs.no; nrksport.no
Rules for classification: 1) points; 2) goal difference; 3) number of goals scored.
(P) Promoted; (R) Relegated

=== Group 2 ===
Pos	Team	Pld	W	D	L	GF	GA	GD	Pts	Promotion or relegation
1	Elverum (P)	26	20	4	2	68	13	+55	64	Promotion to First Division
2	HamKam	26	16	8	2	63	27	+36	56	
3	Hønefoss	26	12	6	8	49	35	+14	42	
4	Brumunddal	26	12	6	8	32	33	−1	42	
5	Nybergsund-Trysil	26	11	7	8	52	45	+7	40	
6	Byåsen	26	12	4	10	44	49	−5	40	
7	Nardo	26	11	6	9	28	36	−8	39	
8	Stjørdals-Blink (R)	26	12	2	12	53	40	+13	38	Relegation to Third Division
9	Brattvåg (R)	26	11	5	10	41	37	+4	38	Relegation to Third Division
10	Strindheim (R)	26	8	6	12	50	60	−10	30	Relegation to Third Division
11	Gjøvik-Lyn (R)	26	7	7	12	27	44	−17	28	Relegation to Third Division
12	Molde 2 (R)	26	6	7	13	42	49	−7	25	Relegation to Third Division
13	Rosenborg 2 (R)	26	6	2	18	31	66	−35	20	Relegation to Third Division
14	Tynset (R)	26	1	4	21	19	65	−46	7	Relegation to Third Division

Source: nifs.no; nrksport.no
Rules for classification: 1) points; 2) goal difference; 3) number of goals scored.
(P) Promoted; (R) Relegated

=== Group 3 ===
Pos	Team	Pld	W	D	L	GF	GA	GD	Pts	Promotion or relegation
1	Florø (P)	26	21	4	1	78	22	+56	67	Promotion to First Division
2	Nest-Sotra	26	19	4	3	83	26	+57	61	
3	Egersund	26	13	4	9	48	28	+20	43	
4	Vard Haugesund	26	11	7	8	46	34	+12	40	
5	Fana	26	10	9	7	35	29	+6	39	
6	Vålerenga 2	26	11	6	9	48	45	+3	39	
7	Vidar	26	12	3	11	55	60	−5	39	
8	Fyllingsdalen (R)	26	9	8	9	46	38	+8	35	Relegation to Third Division
9	Lysekloster (R)	26	10	0	16	40	61	−21	30	Relegation to Third Division
10	Lørenskog (R)	26	8	4	14	41	49	−8	28	Relegation to Third Division
11	Frigg (R)	26	7	5	14	37	62	−25	26	Relegation to Third Division
12	Stord (R)	26	6	6	14	36	65	−29	24	Relegation to Third Division
13	Sola (R)	26	6	3	17	27	60	−33	21	Relegation to Third Division
14	Førde (R)	26	4	7	15	29	70	−41	19	Relegation to Third Division

Source: nifs.no; nrksport.no
Rules for classification: 1) points; 2) goal difference; 3) number of goals scored.
(P) Promoted; (R) Relegated

=== Group 4 ===
Pos	Team	Pld	W	D	L	GF	GA	GD	Pts	Promotion or relegation
1	Arendal (P)	26	19	6	1	75	24	+51	63	Promotion to First Division
2	Bærum	26	14	5	7	55	42	+13	47	
3	Notodden	26	13	6	7	55	35	+20	45	
4	Vindbjart	26	14	2	10	67	50	+17	44	
5	Asker	26	13	4	9	52	44	+8	43	
6	Fram Larvik	26	13	2	11	58	46	+12	41	
7	Odd 2	26	12	5	9	56	51	+5	41	
8	Strømsgodset 2 (R)	26	11	4	11	50	58	−8	37	Relegation to Third Division
9	Kvik Halden (R)	26	10	6	10	47	50	−3	36	Relegation to Third Division
10	Tønsberg (R)	26	10	6	10	38	41	−3	36	Relegation to Third Division
11	Moss (R)	26	9	8	9	57	55	+2	35	Relegation to Third Division
12	Pors Fotball (R)	26	9	2	15	44	71	−27	29	Relegation to Third Division
13	Ørn-Horten (R)	26	3	2	21	28	78	−50	11	Relegation to Third Division
14	Fløy (R)	26	3	0	23	37	74	−37	9	Relegation to Third Division

Source: nifs.no; nrksport.no
Rules for classification: 1) points; 2) goal difference; 3) number of goals scored.
(P) Promoted; (R) Relegated

== Scorers ==
As of match played 22 October 2016

26 goals:

- (Norway) Endre Kupen - Florø

25 goals:

- (Norway) Markus Naglestad - Fram

24 goals:

- (Norway) Øyvind Løkkebø Gausdal - Vindbjart

21 goals:

- (Norway) Johnny Buduson - Skeid
- (Norway) Wilhelm Pepa - Arendal

20 goals:

- (Ivory Coast) (Norway) Kevin Beugré - Hønefoss
- (Norway) David Tavakoli - Skeid

18 goals:

- (Estonia) Kaimar Saag - Nybergsund
- (Norway) Robin Hjelmeseth - Elverum
- (Norway) Mohammed Ahamed Jama - Tromsdalen
- (Denmark) Kasper Højvig Nissen - Øygarden
- (Norway) Sindre Mauritz-Hansen - Asker

17 goals:

- (Norway) Ivar Sollie Rønning - HamKam
- (Norway) Fabian Stensrud Ness - Moss

16 goals:

- (Norway) Mesut Can - Grorud
- (Norway) Johnny Furdal - Øygarden
- (Norway) Sigurd Hauso Haugen - Odd B
- (Norway) Jim Andre Johansen - Notodden

15 goals:

- (Norway) Vegard Båtnes Braaten - Alta

14 goals:

- (Norway) Torbjørn Grytten - Brattvåg
- (Norway) Eirik Woll Kampenes - Fyllingsdalen / Vidar
- (Norway) (Morocco) Omar Fonstad el Ghaouti - Moss / Lørenskog

13 goals:

- (The Gambia) (Sweden) Saihou Jagne - HamKam
- (Norway) Ole Andreas Mundal Nesset - Elverum
- (Sweden) (Bosnia and Herzegovina) Almir Hasan Taletovic - Kvik
- (Norway) Preben Skeie - Vindbjart

12 goals:

- (Norway) Martin Grong Risan - Byåsen
- (Norway) Amund Bollingmo Vingelen - Strindheim
- (Norway) Sondre Hopmark Stokke - Stjørdals-Blink
- (Norway) Lars Henrik Baal Andreassen - Tromsdalen
- (Norway) Andreas Ulland Andersen - Vard
- (Norway) Erlend Ullaland Hove - Florø
- (Norway) Moses Dramwi Mawa - Bærum
- (Norway) Emanuel Kot Chol Tafesse - Bærum

11 goals:

- (Norway) Sebastian Jensen - Senja
- (Norway) Christer Johnsgård - Tromsø B
- (Norway) Morten Skulstad Hillestad - Stord
- (Norway) Stefan Mladenovic - Odd B
- (Norway) Jan Martin Hoel Andersen - Kvik

10 goals:

- (Norway) Sigurd Ertsås - Brumunddal
- (Norway) Jørgen Selnes Sollihaug - Stjørdals-Blink
- (Norway) Bardh Shala - Grorud
- (Norway) Magnus Killingberg Nikolaisen - Alta
- (Norway) Vegard Bergstedt Lysvoll - Tromsdalen
- (Kosovo) Dardan Dreshaj - Follo
- (Norway) Jonas Nikolaisen Simonsen - Finnsnes
- (Norway) Sondre Liseth - Fana
- (Norway) Sami Loulanti - Lørenskog
- (Norway) Kristoffer Kipperberg Tollås - Bærum
- (Denmark) Rasmus Lynge Christensen - Arendal

9 goals:

- (Senegal) Ibrahima Drame - Hønefoss
- (Senegal) Pape Pate Diouf - Molde B
- (Norway) Arne Gunnes - Byåsen
- (Norway) Mathias Dahl Abelsen - Alta
- (Norway) Christian Randa Ellefsen - Harstad
- (Norway) Håvard Haugen Dalseth - Follo
- (Norway) Bjarne Damsgård Langeland - Fyllingsdalen
- (The Gambia) Bubacarr Sumareh - Vard
- (France) Rashad Muhammed - Florø
- (Norway) David Eie - Frigg
- (Norway) Kristoffer Rasmus Rasmussen - Egersund
- (Denmark) Jakob Rasmussen - Arendal
- (Kosovo) Bajram Ajeti - Moss
- (Norway) Christian Østli - Tønsberg

8 goals:

- (Brazil) Ramon Carvalho - Gjøvik-Lyn
- (Norway) Stian Romslo Torgersen - Strindheim
- (Sweden) (Peru) Robin Gabriel Palacios Persson - Brattvåg
- (Norway) Asgeir Volden Snekvik - Byåsen
- (Norway) Mats Størseth Lillebo - Stjørdals-Blink
- (Norway) Albert Berbatovci - Nardo
- (Norway) Daniel Skjølberg Krogstad - Strindheim
- (Norway) Awat Peyghambernejad - Nybergsund
- (Norway) El Hadj Sega Ngom - Alta
- (Norway) Fredrik Levorstad - Follo
- (Norway) Sebastian Pedersen - Stabæk B
- (Norway) Kim André Kristiansen Råde - Mo
- (Norway) Ryan Doghman - Oppsal
- (Norway) Tor Martin Mienna - Tromsdalen
- (Norway) Kristoffer Zachariassen - Øygarden
- (Norway) Kjetil Skogen Kalve - Fyllingsdalen
- (Norway) Ståle Steen Sæthre - Lysekloster
- (Norway) Eirik Jakobsen - Vidar
- (Norway) Runar Ullaland Hove - Florø
- (Sweden) Adnan Cirak - Øygarden
- (Norway) Vegard Severeide Sætre - Vard
- (The Gambia) (Sweden) Alagie Sanyang - Tønsberg
- (Kosovo) (Norway) Ylldren Ibrahimaj - Arendal
- (Norway) Abdul-Basit Agouda - Strømsgodset B

7 goals:

- (Norway) El-mahdi Bellhcen - Elverum
- (Norway) Jonas Enkerud - Elverum
- (Norway) Andreas Løvland - Finnsnes
- (Norway) Remi André Olsen Jakobsen - Mo
- (Norway) Jesper Solli - Kjelsås
- (United States) Ridge J Robinson - Senja
- (Norway) Håkon Kjæve - Tromsdalen
- (Norway) Simen Møller - Kjelsås
- (Norway) Zirak Ahmed - Grorud
- (Norway) Oskar Johannes Løken - Stabæk B
- (Norway) Sverre Larsen - Egersund
- (Norway) Rino Falk Larsen - Vålerenga B
- (Norway) Vetle Lunde Myhre - Sola
- (Norway) Daniel Berntsen - Vidar
- (Norway) Ingvald Sandvik Halgunset - Vidar
- (Norway) Walid Chafouk Idrissi - Lørenskog
- (Norway) Carl Henrik Refvik - Vidar
- (Norway) Knut Ahlander - Strømsgodset B
- (Iceland) Atli Heimisson - Asker
- (Norway) Tobias Johansen Henanger - Arendal

6 goals:

- (Norway) Remi-André Svindland - Elverum
- (Norway) Valentin Blaka - HamKam
- (Norway) Remond Macougne Mendy - Nybergsund
- (Norway) Vegard Østraat Erlien - Rosenborg B
- (Norway) Marius Augdal - Stjørdals-Blink
- (Norway) Sander Svendsen - Molde B
- (Norway) Gabriel Andersen - Harstad
- (Norway) Christian Reginiussen - Alta
- (Norway) Kevin Mankowitz - Grorud
- (Norway) Morten-Andre Slorby - Grorud
- (Norway) Shadi Ali - Follo
- (Norway) Vebjørn Valle Grunnvoll - Finnsnes
- (Norway) Ohi Omoijuanfo - Stabæk B
- (Norway) Imad Ouhadou - Lørenskog
- (Norway) Jonas Heggestad Hestetun - Fana
- (Norway) Roger Blokhus Ekeland - Stord
- (Norway) Henrik Udahl - Vålerenga B
- (Norway) Øystein Myrkaskog - Førde
- (Denmark) Philip Lund - Egersund
- (Norway) Magnus Ask Mikkelsen - Fløy-Flekkerøy
- (Norway) Christian Beqiraj Follerås - Vindbjart
- (Norway) Kamal Saaliti - Notodden
- (Norway) Erik Rosland - Fram
- (Norway) Tim Andre Reinback - Moss
- (Norway) Tobias Lauritsen - Odd B
- (Norway) Kim Sjøberg Bentsen - Pors Fotball
- (Poland) Marcin Jacek Pietron - Fram
- (Norway) Victor Aashildrød Vindfjell - Vindbjart
- (Norway) Øystein Næsheim - Kvik

5 goals:

- (Norway) Feisal Ahmed Hassan - Gjøvik-Lyn
- (Norway) Kristian Eriksen - Brumunddal
- (Cameroon) Thomas Amang - Molde B
- (Norway) Vegard Ruud - Brumunddal
- (Norway) Emil Dahle - HamKam
- (Norway) Mats Lien Vågan - Oppsal
- (Norway) Magnus Aasarød - Kjelsås
- (Norway) Sander Birkeland - Finnsnes
- (Norway) Fredrik Lunde Michalsen - Tromsø B
- (Norway) (United States) Kenneth Di Vita Jensen - Ullern
- (Norway) Marcus Ursin Ingebrigtsen - Harstad
- (Norway) Emil Sildnes - Oppsal
- (Norway) Sondre Laugsand - Senja
- (Norway) Tobias Schjetne - Finnsnes
- (Norway) Tomas Kristoffersen - Tromsdalen
- (Norway) Håkon Saugen Rekdal - Ullern
- (Sudan) Agwa Okuot Obiech - Ullern
- (Norway) Stefan Alexander Dinessen Aase - Florø
- (Norway) Baste Bognøy Jonassen - Lysekloster
- (Norway) Akinbola Olajide Akinyemi - Øygarden
- (Norway) Jonas Tungeland - Stord
- (Norway) Lars Christian Kise - Frigg
- (Sweden) (Albania) Petrit Zhubi - Lysekloster
- (Norway) Fredrik Flo - Fana
- (Norway) Herman Sørby Stengel - Vålerenga B
- (Thailand) (Norway) Kittiphong Pluemjai - Øygarden
- (Norway) Tarjei Skoftedalen Fiskum - Pors Fotball
- (Norway) Adnan Hadzic - Ørn Horten
- (Norway) Eric Bugale Kitolano - Odd B
- (Norway) Andreas Hoven - Strømsgodset B
- (Norway) Lasse Bransdal - Tønsberg
- (Norway) Magnus Høgetveit Hallandvik - Fløy-Flekkerøy
- (Norway) André Bakke - Notodden

4 goals:

- (Norway) Trace Akino Murray - Hønefoss
- (Norway) Harmohan Singh - Brattvåg
- (Denmark) Tanoh Franck Boris Semou - HamKam
- (Spain) Juan Alexander Garcia Alonso - Nybergsund
- (Norway) Mats Oliver Arntsen Bjerkan - Byåsen
- (Norway) Andreas Weigner Rye - Strindheim
- (Nigeria) Joakim Danielsen Solem - Nardo
- (Norway) Kenneth Diallo - Gjøvik-Lyn
- (Norway) Dag Alexander Olsen - Gjøvik-Lyn
- (Sweden) Adnan Cirak - Elverum
- (Brazil) Agnaldo Pinto de Moraes Junior - Molde B
- (Norway) Michael Karlsen - Brattvåg

3 goals:

- (Norway) Marius Dalsaune Nossum - Byåsen
- (Norway) Ole Petter Berget - Hønefoss
- (Norway) (Bosnia and Herzegovina) Eman Markovic - Molde B
- (Norway) Henning Røe - Tynset
- (Norway) Lamine Larbi Nekrouf - Brattvåg
- (Norway) Fredrik Rynning Andresen - Tynset
- (Sweden) Hans Peter Emil Westberg - Gjøvik-Lyn
- (Norway) Henrik Lehne Olsen - Brumunddal / HamKam
- (Norway) Ole Erik Midtskogen - Tynset / HamKam
- (Norway) Ole Kristian Graff Nygård - Nybergsund
- (Spain) Ruben Alegre Guerra - Gjøvik-Lyn
- (Denmark) (Republic of Ireland) Sami Kamel - Hønefoss
- (Norway) Joachim Erlend Olufsen - Strindheim
- (Norway) Lars Martin Husby - Stjørdals-Blink
- (Norway) Sander Erik Kartum - Stjørdals-Blink
- (Norway) (China) Yongyong Hou - Rosenborg B
- (Norway) Andre Brendryen - Tynset
- (Norway) Erlend Tjøtta Vie - Strindheim
- (Norway) Fredrik Lund - Strindheim
- (Norway) Olaus Jair Skarsem - Rosenborg B
