= André Danielsen =

Norwegian footballer (born 1985)

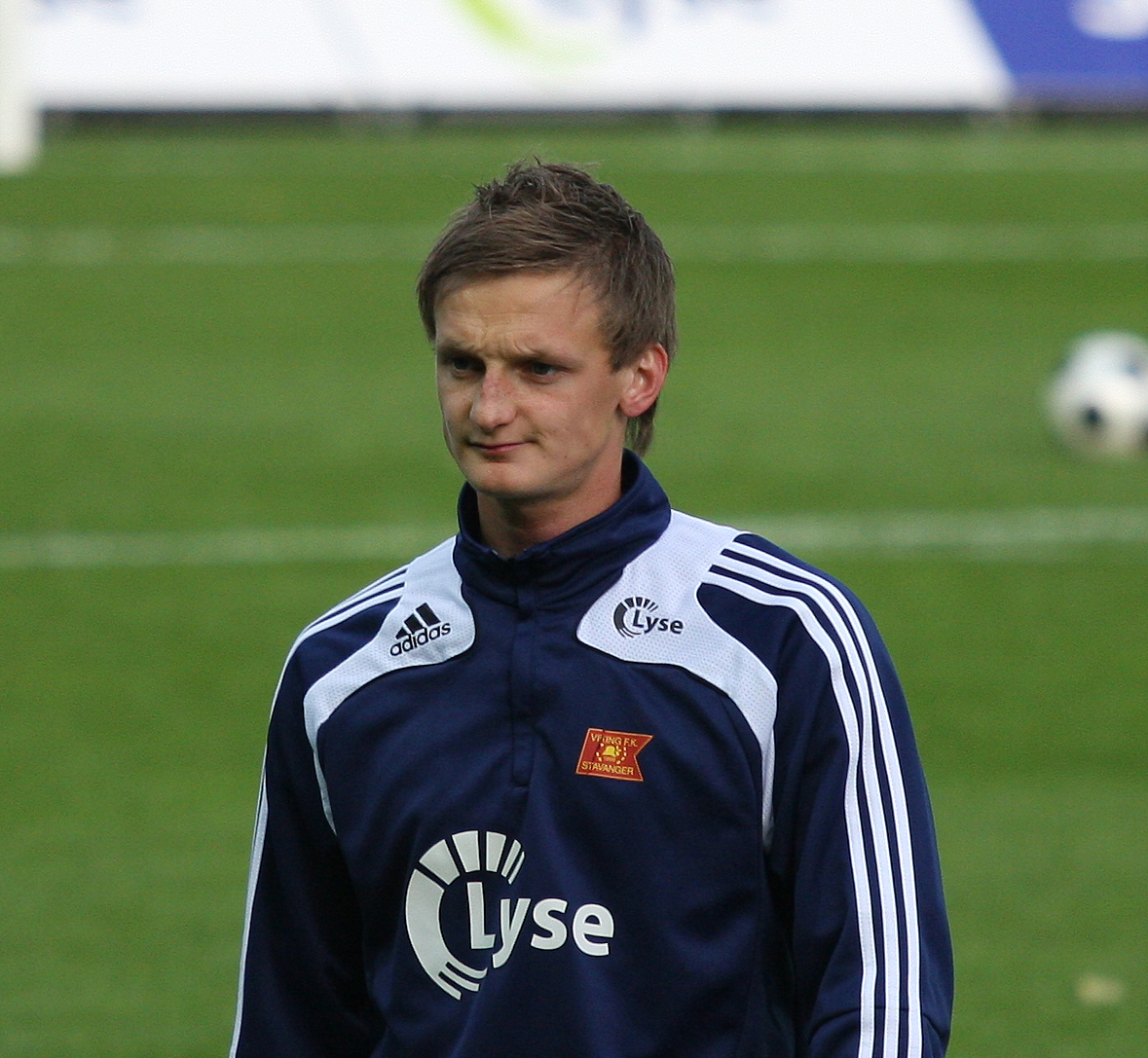
- Danielsen with Viking in 2008

Personal information
- Full name: André Saltvold Danielsen
- Date of birth: 20 January 1985 (age 41)
- Place of birth: Stavanger, Norway
- Height: 1.73 m (5 ft 8 in)
- Positions: Right-back; central midfielder

Youth career
- –2003: Stavanger IF

Senior career*
Years	Team	Apps	(Gls)
2003–2019	Viking	340	(27)
2005	→ Bryne (loan)	14	(0)
Total		354	(27)

International career
2003	Norway U-18	11	(0)
2004	Norway U-19	7	(0)
2004–2006	Norway U-21	7	(0)
2014	Norway	2	(0)
- * Club domestic league appearances and goals

André Saltvold Danielsen (born 20 January 1985) is a Norwegian former footballer who played as a right-back or central midfielder.

== Club career ==
Born in Stavanger, Danielsen started his career with Stavanger IF before joining Viking in 2003. In the fall of 2005 he was loaned out to Bryne. Danielsen is the player with the most appearances for Viking of all time with a total of 553 appearances throughout 17 seasons at the club. This number includes league matches, cup matches, European matches and friendly matches. On 28 October 2019, he announced that he would retire from football after the 2019 season. The same day, he revealed that he would continue to be involved with Viking as a coach for the academy at the club. The 2019 season ended with victory in the 2019 Norwegian Cup Final. Danielsen did not make the squad, but he still received a winner's medal.

== International career ==
Danielsen represented Norwegian national youth teams at under-18, under-19 and under-21 level. He made his senior debut for Norway in a friendly match against Russia on 31 May 2014. In August 2014, he made his second and last international appearance.

== Career statistics ==
Appearances and goals by club, season and competition
Club	Season	League			Cup		Europe		Total	
Club	Season	Division	Apps	Goals	Apps	Goals	Apps	Goals	Apps	Goals
Viking	2003	Eliteserien	10	0	2	0	—		12	0
Viking	2004	Eliteserien	10	0	2	2	—		12	2
Viking	2005	Eliteserien	2	0	3	0	—		5	0
Viking	2006	Eliteserien	11	0	4	0	—		15	0
Viking	2007	Eliteserien	25	0	5	1	—		30	1
Viking	2008	Eliteserien	24	1	4	0	4	0	32	1
Viking	2009	Eliteserien	19	2	3	2	—		22	4
Viking	2010	Eliteserien	29	5	5	1	—		34	6
Viking	2011	Eliteserien	20	3	3	0	—		23	3
Viking	2012	Eliteserien	27	3	4	0	—		31	3
Viking	2013	Eliteserien	17	2	3	0	—		20	2
Viking	2014	Eliteserien	28	1	3	0	—		31	1
Viking	2015	Eliteserien	30	5	6	0	—		36	5
Viking	2016	Eliteserien	29	2	1	0	—		30	2
Viking	2017	Eliteserien	28	1	2	0	—		30	1
Viking	2018	1. divisjon	22	2	1	0	—		23	2
Viking	2019	Eliteserien	9	0	1	0	—		10	0
Viking	Total		340	27	52	6	4	0	396	33
Bryne (loan)	2005	1. divisjon	14	0	0	0	—		14	0
Career total			354	27	52	6	4	0	410	33

== Honours ==
Viking

- Norwegian First Division: 2018
- Norwegian Football Cup: 2019
