= Benjamin Sulimani =

Austrian footballer

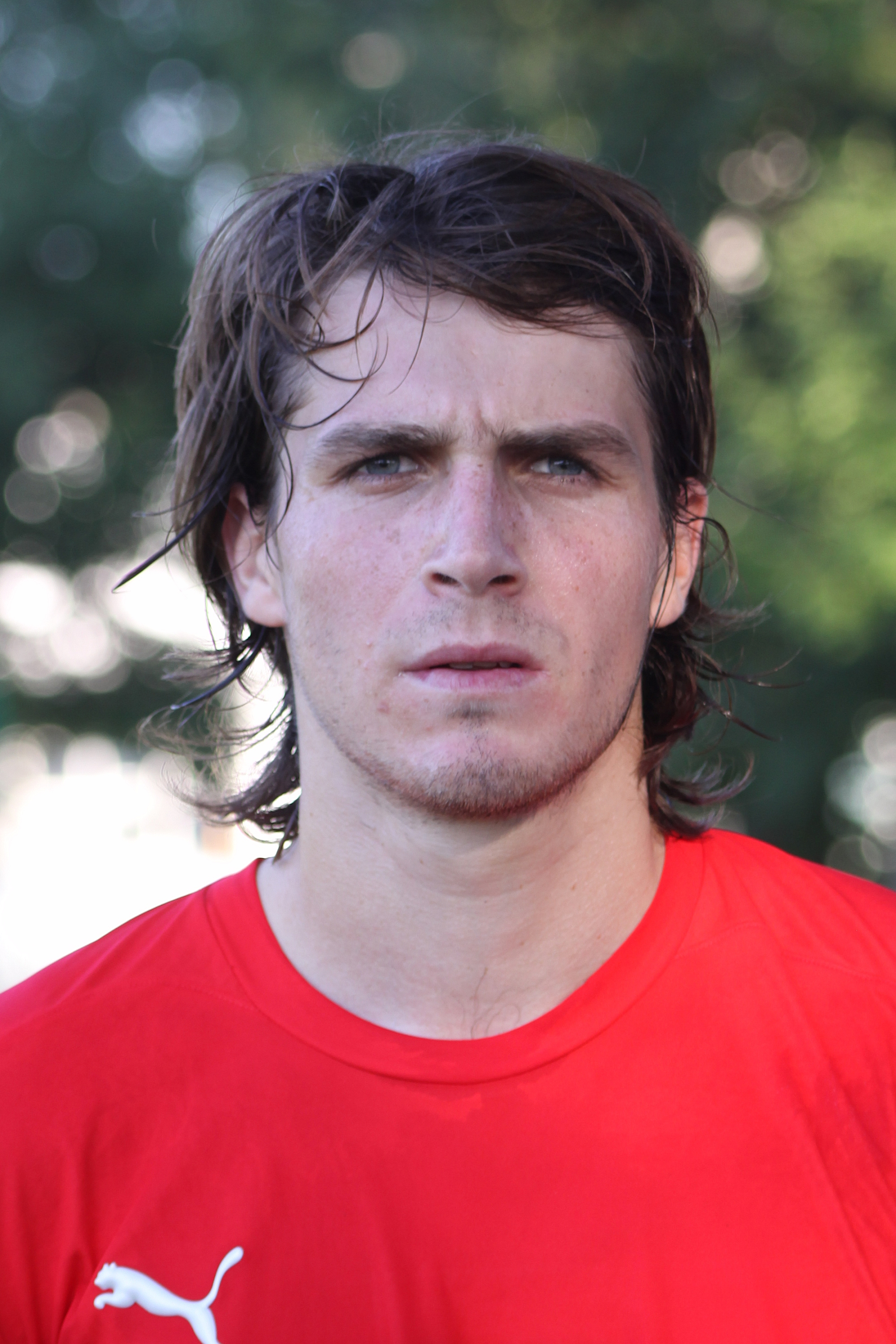

Personal information
- Full name: Benjamin Sulimani
- Date of birth: 26 September 1988 (age 38)
- Place of birth: Wels, Austria
- Height: 1.86 m (6 ft 1 in)
- Position: Forward

Team information
- Current team: SC Korneuburg
- Number: 23

Youth career
- 1994–2001: Hertha Wels
- 2001–2006: SV Ried
- 2006: SpVgg Greuther Fürth

Senior career*
Years	Team	Apps	(Gls)
2006–2007	Kapfenberger SV	7	(1)
2007–2008	Parndorf	17	(5)
2008–2009	Austria Lustenau	10	(3)
2009–2010	Austria Wien	1	(0)
2010–2013	Admira Wacker	72	(25)
2013	Viking	13	(5)
2014–2015	Admira Wacker	38	(9)
2015–2016	SV Grödig	27	(4)
2016–2017	SV Horn	27	(5)
2018–2021	SV Stripfing		
2021–	SC Korneuburg	13	(13)
- * Club domestic league appearances and goals as of 17:55, 26 December 2021 (UTC)

Benjamin Sulimani (born 26 September 1988) is an Austrian footballer who plays for SC Korneuburg.

His brother Emin is also a professional footballer.

== Career ==
In July 2013, Sulimani signed a six-month contract with Tippeligaen side Viking FK, before resigned for Admira Wacker in December 2013.
