= Eldar Hadžimehmedović =

Bosnian-Herzegovinian football player (born 1984)

Personal information
- Date of birth: 10 September 1984 (age 42)
- Place of birth: Tuzla, SR Bosnia-Herzegovina, Yugoslavia
- Height: 1.83 m (6 ft 0 in)
- Position: Striker

Youth career
- Bærum

Senior career*
Years	Team	Apps	(Gls)
2000	Bærum	16	(19)
2001–2004	Lyn	10	(7)
2004	→ Strømsgodset (loan)	14	(1)
2005–2006	Pors Grenland	47	(8)
2007	Bærum		
2008	Modum FK	8	(0)
2009	Lørenskog IF		
2010–2013	Raufoss IL	40	(8)
2014	Brumunddal	2	(0)

International career^{‡}
2000–2002	Bosnia and Herzegovina U-19	3	(0)
2002–2004	Bosnia and Herzegovina U-21	7	(0)
- * Club domestic league appearances and goals as of 2 January 2008 ‡ National team caps and goals as of 16 May 2006

Eldar Hadzimehmedovic (born 10 September 1984) is a retired Bosnian-Herzegovinian football player who played as a striker or as an attacking midfielder. His final club was Norwegian side Brumunddal.

== Life and career ==
He was born in Tuzla, SR Bosnia-Herzegovina, Yugoslavia, and came to Norway at the age of 12. He previously played for Bærum in two periods, Lyn, Strømsgodset, Pors Grenland and Modum FK. Ahead of the 2014 season he went from Raufoss to Brumunddal.

He never made a breakthrough at Lyn, but made a name for himself against NSÍ Runavík in the UEFA Cup qualifying round. In the second leg, the then-18-year-old Hadžimehmedović made the unusual starting eleven, scoring a hat-trick in the first half. He then scored another hat-trick in the first 25 minutes of the second half. Having scored his six goals, he was then substituted in the 70th minute. 6 goals by Eldar Hadzimehmedovic in this game is the most goals scored by a player in one game record in UEFA cup competition, and he currently holds the record for most goals in a match for Lyn, jointly with John Sveinsson.

== International career ==
Hadzimehmedovic has played for the Bosnia and Herzegovina national under-21 football team and the Under-19.
