= Kamal Saaliti =

Moroccan-born Norwegian footballer (born 1979)

Personal information
- Full name: Kamal Saaliti
- Date of birth: August 2, 1979 (age 47)
- Place of birth: Midar, Morocco
- Height: 1.79 m (5 ft 10 in)
- Position: Striker

Senior career*
Years	Team	Apps	(Gls)
1998–2001	Vålerenga	5	(0)
2002–2010	Hønefoss	211	(65)
2011–2012	Sandnes Ulf	48	(18)
2012–2013	Sandefjord	15	(2)
2013–2016	Notodden	82	(34)
2017	Oslo City	6	(1)
2017	Jevnaker	3	(4)
2018–2019	Årvoll	26	(13)
2021	Oslo City	9	(12)
2022–2023	Holmlia	6	(3)
- * Club domestic league appearances and goals as of 11 July 2026

Kamal Saaliti (born 2 August 1979) is a Moroccan-born Norwegian footballer who played as a striker.

He joined Hønefoss ahead of the 2002 season, having previously played for Frigg Oslo as well as Vålerenga in the Norwegian Premier League. He got only 2 Premier League games in 1998 and 1999, but has played 157 league games for Hønefoss. For half a year in 2003 he played for Sassari Torres 1903 in Italy. He scored Hønefoss first goal in Tippeligaen against Haugesund. On 5 January 2011 he signed with Sandnes Ulf.

== Career statistics ==
Season	Club	Division	League		Cup		Total	
Season	Club	Division	Apps	Goals	Apps	Goals	Apps	Goals
2002	Hønefoss	1. divisjon	26	11	0	0	26	11
2003	Hønefoss	1. divisjon	4	1	0	0	4	1
2004	Hønefoss	1. divisjon	29	9	0	0	29	9
2005	Hønefoss	1. divisjon	30	8	5	2	35	10
2006	Hønefoss	1. divisjon	24	10	3	3	27	13
2007	Hønefoss	1. divisjon	29	8	1	2	30	10
2008	Hønefoss	1. divisjon	29	7	0	0	29	7
2009	Hønefoss	1. divisjon	18	10	3	1	21	11
2010	Hønefoss	Eliteserien	22	1	3	2	25	3
2011	Sandnes Ulf	1. divisjon	29	15	3	0	32	15
2012	Sandnes Ulf	Eliteserien	19	3	1	1	20	4
2012	Sandefjord	1. divisjon	11	2	0	0	11	2
2013	Sandefjord	1. divisjon	4	0	2	1	6	1
2013	Notodden	2. divisjon	11	4	0	0	11	4
2014	Notodden	2. divisjon	24	8	2	0	26	8
2015	Notodden	2. divisjon	24	16	2	0	26	16
2016	Notodden	2. divisjon	23	6	1	0	24	6
Career Total			356	119	25	12	381	131
