= Wycliffe Juma =

Kenyan footballer (born 1980)

Wycliffe Juma Oluoch
Personal information
- Date of birth: 6 May 1980 (age 46)
- Place of birth: Nairobi, Kenya
- Position: Defender

Senior career*
Years	Team	Apps	(Gls)
2000–2006	Mathare United		
2006–2007	Løv-Ham		
2008–2010	Nybergsund		
2011–2014	Mjølner		

International career
	Kenya	2	(0)
- * Club domestic league appearances and goals

Wycliffe Juma Oluoch (born 6 May 1980) is a Kenyan football defender who last played for FK Mjølner. He has been capped twice.
