= Simen Standerholen =

Norwegian footballer (born 1993)

Personal information
- Full name: Simen Alexander Standerholen
- Date of birth: 15 October 1993 (age 33)
- Height: 1.83 m (6 ft 0 in)
- Position: Midfielder

Youth career
- Berg
- Fredrikstad

Senior career*
Years	Team	Apps	(Gls)
2011–2015	Fredrikstad	36	(2)
2012	→ Østsiden (loan)	11	(1)

International career
2011	Norway U-18	6	(0)
2012	Norway U-19	1	(0)
- * Club domestic league appearances and goals

Simen Standerholen (born 15 October 1993) is a retired Norwegian football midfielder.

Growing up in Berg, Østfold club Berg IL, he joined the junior setup of Fredrikstad and was also capped as a Norway youth international. He made his Eliteserien debut in June 2011 against Odd, and also played two matches in 2012 Eliteserien (and was loaned out to Østsiden) before Fredrikstad was relegated. He featured during the next two 1. divisjon seasons. He was released ahead of the 2016 season.
