= El Hadj Sega Ngom =

Senegalese footballer

Sega Ngom
Personal information
- Full name: El Hadj Sega Ngom
- Date of birth: 24 June 1990 (age 36)
- Place of birth: Dakar, Senegal
- Height: 1.78 m (5 ft 10 in)
- Position: Striker

Team information
- Current team: Finnsnes
- Number: 77

Youth career
- Yeggo Foot Pro

Senior career*
| Years | Team | Apps | (Gls) |
| 2010–2016 | Alta | 137 | (43) |
| 2011 | → Tromsø (loan) | 3 | (0) |
| 2017– | Finnsnes | 13 | (3) |
- * Club domestic league appearances and goals

El Hadj Sega Ngom (born 24 June 1990) is a Senegalese football striker who currently plays for Norwegian Second Division side Finnsnes.

He started his career in Yeggo Foot Pro. Then in 2010 he signed a contract for Alta. In 2011, he was loaned out to Tromsø.

After six seasons in Alta he went on to Finnsnes IL ahead of the 2017 season.

== Career statistics ==
As of 4 August 2017

| Season | Club | Division | League | | Cup | | Total | |
| Season | Club | Division | Apps | Goals | Apps | Goals | Apps | Goals |
|---|---|---|---|---|---|---|---|---|
| 2010 | Alta | Adeccoligaen | 24 | 4 | 2 | 2 | 26 | 6 |
| 2011 | Alta | Adeccoligaen | 16 | 5 | 3 | 0 | 19 | 5 |
| 2011 | Tromsø | Tippeligaen | 3 | 0 | 0 | 0 | 3 | 0 |
| 2012 | Alta | Adeccoligaen | 0 | 0 | 0 | 0 | 0 | 0 |
| 2013 | Alta | 2. divisjon | 21 | 10 | 2 | 3 | 23 | 13 |
| 2014 | Alta | 1. divisjon | 28 | 6 | 1 | 0 | 29 | 6 |
| 2015 | Alta | 2. divisjon | 25 | 10 | 1 | 0 | 26 | 10 |
| 2016 | Alta | 2. divisjon | 23 | 8 | 3 | 0 | 26 | 8 |
| 2017 | Finnsnes | 2. divisjon | 13 | 3 | 2 | 0 | 15 | 3 |
| Career Total | | | 153 | 46 | 14 | 5 | 167 | 51 |
