= Agnaldo =

Agnaldo is a masculine given name. People with the name include:

- Agnaldo (footballer, born 1958), Brazilian footballer
- Agnaldo (footballer, born 1975), Brazilian footballer
- Agnaldo (footballer, born 1978), Brazilian footballer
- Agnaldo Liz (born 1968), Brazilian footballer and manager
- Agnaldo Moraes (born 1994), Brazilian footballer
- Agnaldo Nunes (born 1976), Brazilian boxer
- Agnaldo Rayol (1938–2024), Brazilian singer and actor
- Agnaldo Timóteo (1936–2021), Brazilian singer and politician
