= Richard Ekunde =

Congolese footballer

Personal information
- Full name: Richard Ntomba Ekunde
- Date of birth: 4 August 1982 (age 44)
- Place of birth: Kinshasa, Zaire
- Height: 1.76 m (5 ft 9 1/2 in)
- Position: Defender

Team information
- Current team: FC Trollhättan
- Number: 5

Youth career
- Kinshasa City

Senior career*
Years	Team	Apps	(Gls)
2002–2004	Djurgårdens IF	0	(0)
2003	→ Åtvidabergs FF (loan)	8	(0)
2005	Åtvidabergs FF	28	(0)
2006–2012	GAIS	151	(0)
2013	Viking	1	(0)
2014–2015	GAIS	34	(1)
2016–	FC Trollhättan	16	(0)

International career^{‡}
2002	DR Congo U20	2	(0)
2003	DR Congo	2	(0)
- * Club domestic league appearances and goals as of 12 February 2016 ‡ National team caps and goals as of 15 September 2012

Richard Ntomba Ekunde (born 4 August 1982 in Kinshasa) is a Congolese footballer who plays for FC Trollhättan as a defender.

== Career ==
He was one of five Congolese players recruited from Kinshasa City by Djurgårdens IF in 2002. In 2003 the reigning Swedish champions loaned him out to their associate club Åtvidabergs FF. Before the 2005 season the move to Åtvidaberg was made permanent.

In December 2005 Ekunde signed a three-year deal with Gothenburg club GAIS and has, barring injuries, been a starting player for them ever since. In 2007, he was given the GAIS player of the year award and also extended his contract to the end of 2012.

On 20 March 2013 Ekunde signed a contract with the Norwegian club Viking.

In March 2014, Ekunde resigned for GAIS.
