= Murder of Anthony Avalos =

2018 torture and killing of a ten-year-old American boy

- Location: Lancaster, California, U.S
- Date: June 21, 2018; 8 years ago
- Attack type: Child murder by beating, torture murder, child abuse, child neglect
- Perpetrators: Heather Barron; Kareem Leiva
- Motive: Homophobia
- Verdict: Guilty
- Convictions: First-degree murder with special circumstances of torture
- Sentence: Life imprisonment without the possibility of parole

Anthony Avalos (May 4, 2008 – June 21, 2018) was a ten-year-old American boy who was tortured and killed after being beaten and suffering internal bleeding. When his body was discovered, it showed signs of physical abuse and malnutrition. His mother, Heather Barron, and her boyfriend, Kareem Leiva, were charged with first-degree murder with special circumstances of torture.

According to Sheriff Jim McDonnell, the arrest of Leiva was made after he made suspicious comments during an initial police interview.

In 2023, both perpetrators were found guilty and sentenced to life in prison without the possibility of parole.

== Background ==
Brandon Nichols, deputy director of the Los Angeles County Department of Children and Family Services, told the Los Angeles Times that Anthony had "said he liked boys" just weeks before his death.

In the aftermath of Avalos' death, several of his relatives revealed that Barron and Leiva had demonstrated repeated evidence of homophobia. They recounted Barron calling Avalos a gay slur and Leiva stating that he was uncomfortable being around homosexuals.

== Abuse ==
During his autopsy, Avalos's body showed clear signs of sustained abuse. He had bruises and burns all over his body, and he was extremely malnourished. According to court testimony, Avalos's aunt, Crystal Diuguid, divulged to her therapist that Avalos's mother was beating, starving, and locking him for hours in a room without any access to the bathroom. He was six years old at the time. The therapist called a child abuse hotline to report the abuse.

Caseworkers responded to 13 complaints of abuse regarding Avalos between February 2013 and April 2016, including sexual abuse when he was four years old.

In a statement, Los Angeles County Deputy District Attorney Jon Hatami said: "There were injuries to Anthony's side and his hip area, both his left hip and his right hip, and his arms, and even injuries to his feet." In another statement, he said, "At one point Anthony could not walk, was unconscious lying on his bedroom floor for hours, was not provided medical attention, and could not eat on his own."

Over the last few days of his life, Avalos was tortured repeatedly. He was whipped all over his body, was held upside-down and dropped on his head, sprayed with hot sauce in his eyes, nose, and mouth, and forced to kneel on rice for several hours.

A 911 call was made one day before Avalos was murdered.

== Department of Child and Family Services ==
For more than four years, from 2013 to 2017, Anthony had been under the supervision of the Los Angeles DCFS. In that period of time, at least 13 known calls (by teachers, counselors, relatives, and police) were made to the child abuse hotline regarding Anthony's welfare. DCFS followed up eight times.

According to a review by CBS News of released documents from DCFS, records from Maximus Inc., court records, and interviews from family and relatives, child protective workers missed numerous warnings of life-threatening abuse and repeatedly failed to intervene.

== Charges ==
On August 28, 2019, the Los Angeles County District Attorney's Office announced it was seeking the death penalty against both Barron and Leiva. Both pled not guilty to intentional first-degree murder with the special circumstance of infliction of torture on the victim. In addition to the murder with special circumstances charge, Barron was charged with an additional abuse charge of one of her other sons. The Los Angeles County District Attorney's Office under District Attorney George Gascón subsequently dropped the death penalty option for both Barron and Leiva. On March 7, 2023, Barron and Leiva were found guilty. On April 25, 2023, they were sentenced to life in prison without parole.
