= King Gyan =

Ghanaian footballer

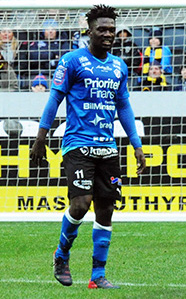

Personal information
- Full name: King Osei Gyan
- Date of birth: 22 December 1988 (age 37)
- Place of birth: Accra, Ghana
- Height: 5 ft 9 in (1.75 m)
- Position: Midfielder

Youth career
- –2004: Right to Dream Academy
- 2004–2006: Dunn School
- 2006–2007: Fulham

Senior career*
Years	Team	Apps	(Gls)
2007–2010	Fulham	0	(0)
2007–2010	→ Germinal Beerschot (loan)	57	(2)
2011–2013	Viking	56	(6)
2014–2015	Halmstads BK	45	(1)

International career^{‡}
2008	Ghana	1	(0)
- * Club domestic league appearances and goals as of 1 January 2016 ‡ National team caps and goals as of December 2009

King Osei Gyan (born 22 December 1988) is a Ghanaian former professional footballer who played as a midfielder. He played for Fulham, Germinal Beerschot, Viking and Halmstads BK.

== Club career ==
Gyan trained at the Right to Dream Academy in Ghana before leaving his home country for the United States to further his football career. While attending Dunn School, Gyan was honored as a 2005 NSCAA/adidas Boys High School All-America Team. That same year, he was awarded the 2005 NSCAA/adidas High School Boys State Player of the Year for the state of California. In 2006, he joined the youth system of English Premiership club Fulham, and in 2008 was loaned to Belgian Jupiler League side Germinal Beerschot until 2010 due to work permit issues. He was released in the summer of 2010.

In January 2011, Gyan joined Canadian club Toronto FC of Major League Soccer on trial for their pre-season in Antalya, Turkey. After a two-week training camp with Viking, he signed a contract with the Norwegian Premier League club. Swedish club Halmstads BK signed him on a one-year contract after a week of tryouts on 11 February 2014.

Gyan retired from professional football in 2016, and has since worked for the Right to Dream Academy.

== International career ==
Gyan represented Ghana at senior international level in a friendly fixture against Tanzania in 2008.
