= Dardan Dreshaj =

Norwegian footballer (born 1992)

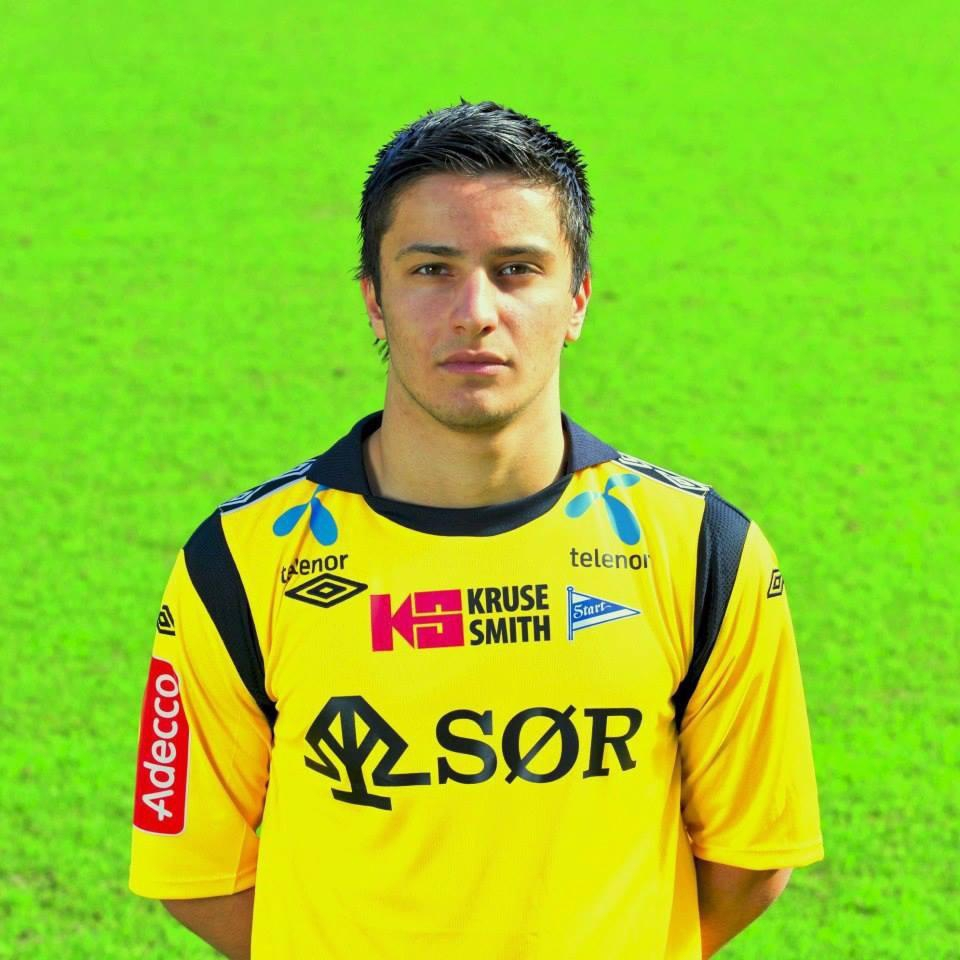

Personal information
- Date of birth: 4 August 1992 (age 34)
- Place of birth: Levanger, Norway
- Position: Forward

Team information
- Current team: Trauma
- Number: 10

Youth career
- Mandalskameratene
- 2010–2011: Start

Senior career*
Years	Team	Apps	(Gls)
2011–2012	Start	8	(2)
2013	Flekkerøy	25	(8)
2014	Fram	25	(19)
2015	Arendal	23	(7)
2016	Follo	19	(10)
2017–2021	Flekkerøy	83	(49)
2021–	Trauma	18	(11)
- * Club domestic league appearances and goals as of 1 July 2022

Dardan Dreshaj (born 4 August 1992) is a Norwegian football striker who plays for Trauma.

Of Kosovan descent, his parents migrated to Norway in 1990. Dreshaj was born in Levanger, but grew up in Mandal Municipality. After playing youth and B team football for Mandalskameratene and Start he made his debut for Start in the 2011 Eliteserien game against Haugesund, scoring Start's only goal. The next year he got league 7 games, now in the 2012 1. divisjon. From 2013 to 2016 he spent one season each in Flekkerøy, Fram, Arendal and Follo, always scoring double figures in league and cup combined. In 2017 he rejoined Flekkerøy and scored 24 goals in 25 league games.
