= Simen Møller =

Norwegian footballer and commentator (born 1988)

Simen Stamsø Møller
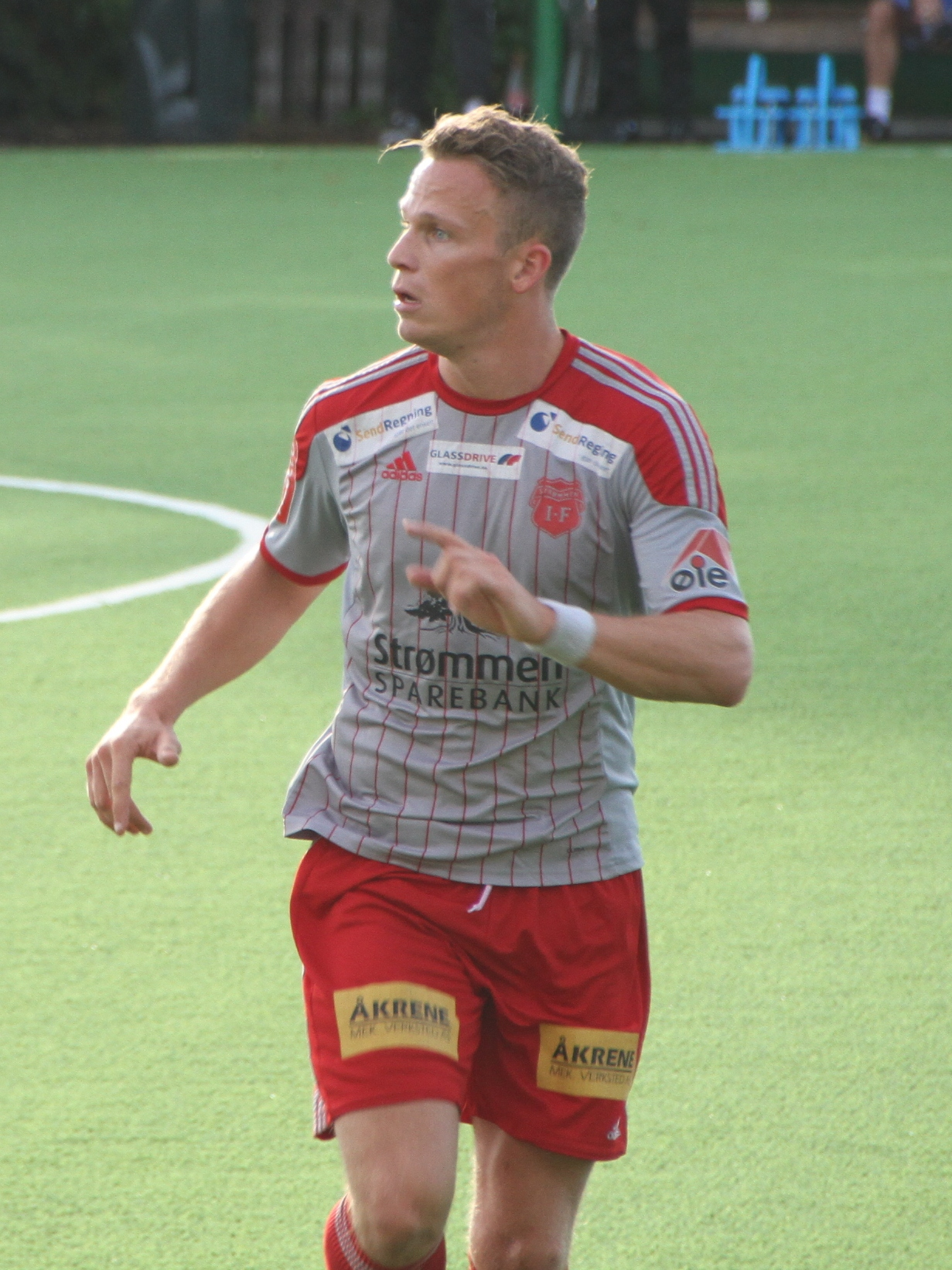
- Møller in 2012

Personal information
- Full name: Simen Axel Stamsø Møller
- Date of birth: 6 September 1988 (age 38)
- Place of birth: Oslo, Norway
- Height: 1.85 m (6 ft 1 in)
- Position: Forward

Team information
- Current team: Kjelsås 2

Youth career
- –1997: Lille Tøyen
- 1998–2004: Skeid

Senior career*
Years	Team	Apps	(Gls)
2005–2010	Kjelsås		
2011–2012	Tromsø	1	(0)
2011	→ Strømmen (loan)	13	(9)
2012–2013	Strømmen	37	(8)
2014–2016	Kjelsås	58	(40)
2017–2018	Årvoll	17	(18)
2017	→ Biggleswade United (loan)	8	(5)
2019–	Kjelsås 2	2	(2)
- * Club domestic league appearances and goals as of 5 November 2020

Simen Axel Stamsø-Møller (born 6 September 1988) is a Norwegian former football forward, as well as a football commentator on national television.

== Career ==
=== Early career ===
He started his youth career in Lille Tøyen, before he transferred to the local talent club Skeid, at the age of 10. In Skeid he was overshadowed by his older brother, Julian, and when he started at Bjerke Upper Secondary School, he chose to study media and communications, instead of elite sports like his brother. He therefore left Skeid, and signed for Kjelsås.

=== Kjelsås ===
Møller had his breakthrough in Kjelsås in 2009, scoring 20 of the total 38 goals Kjelsås had that season, preventing relegation from the 2009 Norwegian Second Division. The 2010-season started out with injury problems, but he still ended up scoring 16 goals in the league that season. He was then discovered by the Norwegian scout Stig Marius Torbjørnsen, and went to Tromsø on trial.

=== Tromsø ===
On 18 October 2010, he signed a three-year contract with the North Norwegian club. Tromsø manager Per Mathias Høgmo described him as a "goalgetter", and that he would be a great addition to his 2011-squad.

On 4 January 2011, he travelled up north to continue his football career. He made his debut against Tromsdalen in a friendly match in January 2011, coming on in the second half and scored two goals. He came on as a substitute against FC Daugava in the Europa League on 30 June for his first official match. Four days later, in an away match against Fredrikstad FK he was again brought on as a substitute for his first league match.

In 2014, he returned to third-tier Kjelsås. His job outside of playing was that of football commentator, commenting Italian football for C More. In July 2015 he was hired by TV 2 to work with the Premier League.

== Career statistics ==
Club	Season	Division	League		Cup		Europe		Total	
Club	Season	Division	Apps	Goals	Apps	Goals	Apps	Goals	Apps	Goals
Kjelsås	2009	2. divisjon	2	0	0	0	0	0	2	0
Kjelsås	2010	Fair Play ligaen	3	0	1	0	0	0	4	0
Tromsø	2011	Tippeligaen	1	0	2	0	4	1	7	1
Strømmen	2011	Adeccoligaen	13	9	0	0	0	0	13	9
Strømmen 2	2012	3. divisjon	5	3	0	0	0	0	5	3
Strømmen	2012	Adeccoligaen	29	6	2	1	0	0	31	7
Strømmen 2	2013	3. divisjon	3	4	0	0	0	0	3	4
Total Strømmen 2			8	7	0	0	0	0	8	7
Strømmen	2013	Adeccoligaen	8	2	2	3	0	0	10	5
Total Strømmen			50	17	4	4	0	0	54	21
Kjelsås 2	2014	3. divisjon	2	1	0	0	0	0	2	1
Kjelsås	2014	Oddsen-ligaen	23	13	1	0	0	0	24	13
Kjelsås 2	2015	4. divisjon	3	5	0	0	0	0	3	5
Kjelsås	2015	Oddsen-ligaen	20	20	2	1	0	0	22	21
Kjelsås 2	2016	3. divisjon	5	2	0	0	0	0	5	2
Kjelsås	2016	PostNord-ligaen	15	7	0	0	0	0	15	7
Total Kjelsås			63	40	4	1	0	0	67	41
Biggleswade United	2016–17	Spartan South Midlands Football League	8	5	0	0	0	0	8	5
Årvoll	2017	4. divisjon	9	8	0	0	0	0	9	8
Årvoll	2018	4. divisjon	5	6	3	4	0	0	8	9
Total Årvoll			14	14	3	4	0	0	17	18
Kjelsås 2	2019	4. divisjon	2	2	0	0	0	0	2	2
Total Kjelsås 2			12	10	0	0	0	0	12	10
Career Total			156	93	12	9	4	1	172	103
