= Andreas Ulland Andersen =

Norwegian footballer (born 1989)

Personal information
- Full name: Andreas Ulland Andersen
- Date of birth: 6 May 1989 (age 37)
- Place of birth: Haugesund, Norway
- Height: 1.77 m (5 ft 9 1/2 in)
- Position: Winger

Team information
- Current team: Avaldsnes

Youth career
- Vard Haugesund

Senior career*
Years	Team	Apps	(Gls)
2007–2011	Viking	25	(0)
2010	→ Sandnes Ulf (loan)	11	(0)
2011	→ Randaberg (loan)	28	(6)
2012	Sandnes Ulf	11	(0)
2013–2014	Bryne	41	(3)
2015–2018	Vard Haugesund	81	(41)
2019–	Avaldsnes	54	(32)

International career^{‡}
2006	Norway U-17	5	(1)
2007	Norway U-18	10	(1)
2008	Norway U-19	5	(0)

Managerial career
- 2019–: Avaldsnes (player-manager)
- * Club domestic league appearances and goals as of 25 May 2023 ‡ National team caps and goals as of 1 November 2018

Andreas Ulland Andersen (born 6 May 1989) is a Norwegian footballer who plays as a midfielder. He is the current player-manager for Avaldsnes.

== Club career ==
He joined Viking in autumn 2006, after playing for the Norwegian team Vard Haugesund.

In the latter half of 2010 he joined Sandnes Ulf on loan. During the 2011 season, Andersen was on another loan, this time to Randaberg.

Andersen signed a one-year contract with Sandnes Ulf after being released by Viking ahead of the 2012-season. Ahead of the 2013 season he joined Bryne FK.

He is the older brother of the footballer Eirik Ulland Andersen.

== Career statistics ==
As of 1 November 2018

Season	Club	Division	League		Cup		Total	
Season	Club	Division	Apps	Goals	Apps	Goals	Apps	Goals
2007	Viking	Tippeligaen	1	0	1	1	2	1
2008	Viking	Tippeligaen	4	0	3	0	7	0
2009	Viking	Tippeligaen	11	0	1	0	12	0
2010	Viking	Tippeligaen	9	0	1	0	10	0
2010	Sandnes Ulf (loan)	1. divisjon	11	0	0	0	11	0
2011	Randaberg (loan)	1. divisjon	28	6	2	2	30	8
2012	Sandnes Ulf	Tippeligaen	11	0	1	0	12	0
2013	Bryne	1. divisjon	26	3	2	1	28	4
2014	Bryne	1. divisjon	15	0	2	0	17	0
2015	Vard Haugesund	2. divisjon	19	14	1	1	20	15
2016	Vard Haugesund	2. divisjon	24	12	2	0	26	12
2017	Vard Haugesund	2. divisjon	16	6	0	0	16	6
2018	Vard Haugesund	2. divisjon	22	9	1	0	23	9
Career total			197	50	17	5	214	55
