= 2012 FK Haugesund season =

Haugesund
2012 season
- Chairman: Leif Helge Kaldheim
- Manager: Jostein Grindhaug
- Stadium: Haugesund Stadion
- Tippeligaen: 7th
- Norwegian Cup: Quarterfinal vs Hødd
- Top goalscorer: League: Nikola Đurđić (12); All: Nikola Đurđić (17)
| Home colours | Away colours |

The 2012 season was Haugesund's third season in the Tippeligaen following their promotion in 2009 and their 4th season with Jostein Grindhaug as manager.

== Squad ==
As of 23 August 2012 Note: Flags indicate national team as defined under FIFA eligibility rules; some limited exceptions apply. Players may hold more than one non-FIFA nationality.

| No. | Pos. | Nation | Player |
|---|---|---|---|
| 1 | GK | NOR | Per Morten Kristiansen (captain) |
| 2 | DF | NOR | Joakim Våge Nilsen |
| 3 | DF | SWE | David Myrestam |
| 5 | MF | NOR | Trygve Nygaard |
| 6 | MF | NOR | Håvard Storbæk |
| 7 | FW | NOR | Oddbjørn Skartun |
| 8 | MF | NOR | Michael Haukås |
| 9 | FW | NOR | Alexander Søderlund |
| 10 | MF | SLE | Umaru Bangura |
| 11 | DF | NOR | Tor Arne Andreassen |
| 12 | GK | NOR | Lars Øvernes |

| No. | Pos. | Nation | Player |
|---|---|---|---|
| 13 | MF | NOR | Eirik Mæland |
| 14 | DF | ISL | Andrés Már Jóhannesson |
| 15 | DF | NOR | Martin Bjørnbak |
| 16 | MF | NGR | Ugonna Anyora |
| 17 | MF | NOR | Geir Ludvig Fevang |
| 18 | DF | NOR | Vegard Skjerve |
| 19 | MF | NOR | Kristoffer Haraldseid |
| 20 | FW | SWE | Maic Sema |
| 21 | FW | SWE | Pontus Engblom |
| 25 | FW | NOR | Henrik Kjelsrud Johansen |

=== Out on loan ===
Note: Flags indicate national team as defined under FIFA eligibility rules; some limited exceptions apply. Players may hold more than one non-FIFA nationality.

| No. / Pos. / Nation / Player; 4 / DF / CAN / Chris Pozniak (at Bryne until the end of the 2012-season) | No. / Pos. / Nation / Player; 44 / FW / SRB / Nikola Đurđić (at Helsingborg until 15 January 2013) |

== Transfers ==
=== Winter ===
In: Note: Flags indicate national team as defined under FIFA eligibility rules; some limited exceptions apply. Players may hold more than one non-FIFA nationality.

| No. | Pos. | Nation | Player |
|---|---|---|---|
| 6 | MF | NOR | Håvard Storbæk (from (Norway) Odd Grenland) |
| 8 | MF | NOR | Michael Haukås (from (Norway) Bodø/Glimt) |
| 15 | DF | NOR | Martin Bjørnbak (from (Norway) Bodø/Glimt) |
| 20 | FW | SWE | Maic Sema (from (Sweden) Hammarby) |

Out: Note: Flags indicate national team as defined under FIFA eligibility rules; some limited exceptions apply. Players may hold more than one non-FIFA nationality.

| No. | Pos. | Nation | Player |
|---|---|---|---|
| 21 | MF | NOR | Eirik Ulland Andersen (to (Norway) Vard Haugesund) |
| — | DF | NOR | Are Tronseth (to (Norway) Ranheim) |

=== Summer ===
In: Note: Flags indicate national team as defined under FIFA eligibility rules; some limited exceptions apply. Players may hold more than one non-FIFA nationality.

| No. | Pos. | Nation | Player |
|---|---|---|---|
| 3 | DF | SWE | David Myrestam (from (Sweden) GIF Sundsvall) |
| 21 | FW | SWE | Pontus Engblom (from (Sweden) AIK) |
| 22 | MF | BIH | Amer Osmanagic (from (Serbia) OFK Beograd) |

Out: Note: Flags indicate national team as defined under FIFA eligibility rules; some limited exceptions apply. Players may hold more than one non-FIFA nationality.

| No. | Pos. | Nation | Player |
|---|---|---|---|
| 3 | DF | FRA | Derek Decamps (to (France) Angers) |
| 4 | DF | CAN | Chris Pozniak (loan to (Norway) Bryne) |
| 22 | MF | BIH | Amer Osmanagić |
| 44 | FW | SRB | Nikola Đurđić (loan to (Sweden) Helsingborg) |

== Competitions ==
=== Tippeligaen ===
==== Results summary ====
| Overall | | | | | | | | Home | | | | | | Away | | | | | |
| Pld | W | D | L | GF | GA | GD | Pts | W | D | L | GF | GA | GD | W | D | L | GF | GA | GD |
|---|---|---|---|---|---|---|---|---|---|---|---|---|---|---|---|---|---|---|---|
| 30 | 11 | 9 | 10 | 46 | 40 | +6 | 42 | 8 | 4 | 3 | 26 | 16 | +10 | 3 | 5 | 7 | 20 | 24 | −4 |

==== Results by round ====
| Round | 1 | 2 | 3 | 4 | 5 | 6 | 7 | 8 | 9 | 10 | 11 | 12 | 13 | 14 | 15 | 16 | 17 | 18 | 19 | 20 | 21 | 22 | 23 | 24 | 25 | 26 | 27 | 28 | 29 | 30 |
|---|---|---|---|---|---|---|---|---|---|---|---|---|---|---|---|---|---|---|---|---|---|---|---|---|---|---|---|---|---|---|
| Ground | A | H | A | A | H | A | H | A | H | A | H | A | H | A | H | H | A | H | A | H | H | A | H | A | H | A | H | A | H | A |
| Result | L | W | D | D | W | W | D | D | W | W | D | W | D | L | L | D | L | W | L | W | L | L | W | L | W | L | L | D | W | D |
| Position | 12 | 6 | 7 | 10 | 7 | 4 | 4 | 5 | 4 | 3 | 3 | 3 | 3 | 4 | 4 | 4 | 5 | 4 | 7 | 4 | 6 | 7 | 7 | 8 | 7 | 8 | 8 | 8 | 7 | 7 |

Source: see below
A = Away; H = Home; W = Win; D = Draw; L = Loss

==== Results ====
| 25 March 2012 1 | Vålerenga | 2–1 | Haugesund | Oslo |
| 18:00 CET (UTC+1) | Nordvik (yellow card) 55'; Pušić (yellow card) 65' (goal) 90+2'; Nielsen 83' | Summary | Bjørnbak (red card) 33'; Đurđić 38' (pen.); Søderlund (yellow card) 61' | Stadium: Haugesund Stadion; Attendance: 12,445; Referee: Per Ivar Staberg |

| 1 April 2012 2 | Haugesund | 2–0 | Molde | Haugesund |
| 18:00 CEST (UTC+2) | Søderlund 15', 54'; Andreassen (yellow card) 38' | Summary | Hoseth (yellow card) 55' | Stadium: Haugesund Stadion; Attendance: 4,880; Referee: Tore Hansen |

| 9 April 2012 3 | Strømsgodset | 3–3 | Haugesund | Drammen |
| 18:00 CEST (UTC+2) | Diomande 33'; Kamara 57' (pen.); Kovács 84' | Summary | Đurđić 18', 43' (yellow card) 89'; Skjerve (yellow card) 57'; Andreassen 86' | Stadium: Marienlyst Stadion; Attendance: 4,726; Referee: Espen Berntsen |

| 15 April 2012 4 | Sogndal | 1–1 | Haugesund | Sogndalsfjøra |
| 18:00 CET (UTC+1) | Mané 10'; Teniste (yellow card) 90+4' | Summary | Søderlund 73' | Stadium: Fosshaugane Campus; Attendance: 3,114; Referee: Kristoffer Helgerud |

| 21 April 2012 5 | Haugesund | 2–1 | Brann | Haugesund |
| 18:00 CEST (UTC+2) | Skjerve (yellow card) 24'; Søderlund 34'; Đurđić 34' | Summary | El Fakiri (yellow card) 29'; Ojo 41'; Mjelde (yellow card) 73' | Stadium: Haugesund Stadion; Attendance: 5,000; Referee: Ken Henry Johnsen |

| 28 April 2012 6 | Viking | 0–2 | Haugesund | Stavanger |
| 18:00 CET (UTC+1) | de Lanlay (yellow card) 44' | Summary | Søderlund 4'; Nilsen (yellow card) 67'; Fevang 80' | Stadium: Viking Stadion; Attendance: 13,443; Referee: Per Ivar Staberg |

| 6 May 2012 7 | Haugesund | 1–1 | Lillestrøm | Haugesund |
| 18:00 CEST (UTC+2) | Sema 57' | Summary | Sigurdarson 35' | Stadium: Haugesund Stadion; Attendance: 4,646; Referee: Kjetil Saelen |

| 13 May 2012 8 | Fredrikstad | 0–0 | Haugesund | Fredrikstad |
| 18:00 CET (UTC+1) | Landgren (yellow card) 28'; Jabbie (yellow card) 89' | Summary | Søderlund (yellow card) 25' | Stadium: Fredrikstad Stadion; Attendance: 6,045; Referee: Trond Ivar Døvle |

| 16 May 2012 9 | Haugesund | 4–2 | Aalesund | Haugesund |
| 18:00 CEST (UTC+2) | Đurđić 27' (pen.), 29', 45' (yellow card) 57'; Fevang (yellow card) 34'; Nilsen (yellow card) 46'; Haukås 51'; Nygaard (yellow card) 55' | Summary | Stewart 56' (yellow card) 63'; Arnefjord 61'; Tollås (yellow card) 85' | Stadium: Haugesund Stadion; Attendance: 4,857; Referee: Anders Johansen |

| 20 May 2012 10 | Stabæk | 0–2 | Haugesund | Bærum |
| 18:00 CEST (UTC+2) | Clark (yellow card) 19'; Cunningham (yellow card) 56'; Stengel (yellow card) 58' | Summary | Søderlund 37', 65'; Fevang (yellow card) 44' | Stadium: Nadderud Stadion; Attendance: 3,721; Referee: Tore Hansen |

| 24 May 2012 11 | Haugesund | 1–1 | Hønefoss | Haugesund |
| 19:00 CEST (UTC+2) | Sema 51'; Fevang (yellow card) 80' | Summary | Sigurðsson (yellow card) 38' (yellow-red card) 69'; Riski 90' (yellow card) 90+1' | Stadium: Haugesund Stadion; Attendance: 4,520; Referee: Tommy Skjerven |

| 28 May 2012 12 | Sandnes Ulf | 0–2 | Haugesund | Sandnes |
| 18:00 CEST (UTC+2) | Espedal (yellow card) 29'; Þorsteinsson (yellow card) 56' | Summary | Søderlund 32'; Decamps (yellow card) 33'; Anyora (yellow card) 40'; Đurđić 68'; Skjerve (yellow card) 83' | Stadium: Sandnes Idrettspark; Attendance: 4,710; Referee: Trond Ivar Døvle |

| 30 June 2012 13 | Haugesund | 1–1 | Tromsø | Haugesund |
| 18:00 CEST (UTC+2) | Đurđić 51' | Summary | Norbye 59'; Yndestad (yellow card) 78'; Drage (yellow card) 82' | Stadium: Haugesund Stadion; Attendance: 4,520; Referee: Tommy Skjerven |

| 8 July 2012 14 | Odd Grenland | 2–1 | Haugesund | Skien |
| 18:00 CEST (UTC+2) | Güven 31'; Børven 50' | Summary | Haukås (yellow card) 57'; Đurđić (yellow card) 72'; Decamps 79' | Stadium: Skagerak Arena; Attendance: 4,515; Referee: Trond Ivar Døvle |

| 15 July 2012 15 | Haugesund | 0–1 | Rosenborg | Haugesund |
| 20:00 CEST (UTC+2) | Bangura (yellow card) 60' | Summary | Wangberg (yellow card) 8'; Issah (yellow card) 41'; Dočkal 49' (yellow card) 59' | Stadium: Haugesund Stadion; Attendance: 4,935; Referee: Per Ivar Staberg |

| 20 July 2012 16 | Haugesund | 0–0 | Sogndal | Haugesund |
| 29:00 CEST (UTC+2) | Skjerve (yellow card) 17'; Đurđić (yellow card) 71' | Summary | | Stadium: Haugesund Stadion; Attendance: 4,554; Referee: Trond Ivar Døvle |

| 29 July 2012 17 | Hønefoss | 3–2 | Haugesund | Hønefoss |
| 18:00 CEST (UTC+2) | Groven 38'; Sigurðsson 67'; Mora 73' | Summary | Bangura (yellow card) 30'; Fevang 45+1'; Đurđić 50'; Bjørnbak (yellow card) 66' | Stadium: Aka Arena; Attendance: 1,876; Referee: Andres Johansen |

| 3 August 2012 18 | Haugesund | 4–2 | Vålerenga | Haugesund |
| 19:00 CEST (UTC+2) | Osmanagić 22'; Mæland 50'; Søderlund 90'; Engblom 90+2' | Summary | Suleiman (yellow card) 52'; Fellah 58'; Pušić 71'; Berre (yellow card) 76' | Stadium: Haugesund Stadion; Attendance: 4,421; Referee: Kristoffer Helgerud |

| 11 August 2012 19 | Brann | 3–2 | Haugesund | Bergen |
| 18:00 CEST (UTC+2) | Askar 39', 61'; Nordkvelle 59'; Haugen (yellow card) 86' | Summary | Đurđić 67', 77'; Engblom (yellow card) 90+1' | Stadium: Brann Stadion; Attendance: 15,328; Referee: Per Ivar Staberg |

| 26 August 2012 20 | Haugesund | 4–1 | Stabæk | Haugesund |
| 18:00 CEST (UTC+2) | Søderlund 1'; Fevang 3'; Myrestam 23'; Storbæk 50' | Summary | Eiríksson (yellow card) 10'; Haidar (yellow card) 35'; Larsen (yellow card) 38'; Haugsdal 45+2'; Gunnarsson (yellow card) 68' | Stadium: Haugesund Stadion; Attendance: 4,349; Referee: Svein-Erik Edvartsen |

| 2 September 2012 21 | Haugesund | 0–1 | Odd Grenland | Haugesund |
| 18:00 CEST (UTC+2) | Anyora (yellow card) 84' | Summary | Niklas Gunnarsson 85'; Rashani (yellow card) 89' | Stadium: Haugesund Stadion; Attendance: 4,024; Referee: Tore Hansen |

| 15 September 2012 22 | Molde | 1–0 | Haugesund | Molde |
| 18:00 CEST (UTC+2) | Berget 13' | Report | Skjerve (yellow card) 45+2' | Stadium: Aker Stadion; Attendance: 8,614; Referee: Brage Sandmoen |

| 23 September 2012 23 | Haugesund | 3–2 | Sandnes Ulf | Haugesund |
| 18:00 CEST (UTC+2) | Storbæk 19'; Johansen 77'; Myrestam 85' | Summary | Gytkjær 16'; Þorsteinsson 38' (yellow card) 59' | Stadium: Haugesund Stadion; Attendance: 4,219; Referee: Trygve Kjensli |

| 28 September 2012 24 | Rosenborg | 5–2 | Haugesund | Trondheim |
| 19:00 CEST (UTC+2) | Diskerud (yellow card) 24' (goal) 88'; Dočkal (yellow card) 29' (goal) 55'; Søderlund 47' (o.g.); Prica 68'; Chibuike 83' | Summary | Myrestam (yellow card) 10'; Fevang 17', 73'; Bjørnbak (yellow card) 49'; Bangura (yellow card) 54' | Stadium: Lerkendal Stadion; Attendance: 11,249; Referee: Anders Johansen |

| 7 October 2012 25 | Haugesund | 1–0 | Fredrikstad | Haugesund |
| 18:00 CEST (UTC+2) | Søderlund (yellow card) 20'; Fevang 90' | Summary | Landgren (yellow card) 31'; Jabbie (yellow card) 45+1' | Stadium: Haugesund Stadion; Attendance: 3,854; Referee: Kristoffer Helgerud |

| 21 October 2012 26 | Tromsø | 2–0 | Haugesund | Tromsø |
| 18:00 CEST (UTC+2) | Mbodj (yellow card) 21'; Prijović 58'; Årst 74' | Summary | Storbæk (yellow card) 37'; Bangura (yellow card) 57' | Stadium: Alfheim Stadion; Attendance: 3,843; Referee: Anders Johansen |

| 26 October 2012 27 | Haugesund | 2–3 | Strømsgodset | Haugesund |
| 19:00 CEST (UTC+2) | Engblom 44'; Haukås 76' | Summary | Kovács 49', 90+5'; Storbæk 54'; Ibrahim (yellow card) 61'; Johansen (yellow card) 65' | Stadium: Haugesund Stadion; Attendance: 3,954; Referee: Ken Henry Johnsen |

| 4 November 2012 28 | Aalesund | 2–2 | Haugesund | Ålesund |
| 18:00 CET (UTC+1) | Barrantes 11'; James 34'; Stewart (yellow card) 90' | Summary | Haukås 78'; Fevang 87' | Stadium: Color Line Stadion; Attendance: 8,324; Referee: Trond Ivar Døvle |

| 11 November 2012 29 | Haugesund | 1–0 | Viking | Haugesund |
| 18:00 CET (UTC+1) | Nygaard (yellow card) 65'; Søderlund (yellow card) 79'; Andreassen 85' | Summary | | Stadium: Haugesund Stadion; Attendance: 5,000; Referee: Anders Johansen |

| 18 November 2012 30 | Lillestrøm | 0–0 | Haugesund | Lillestrøm |
| 18:00 CET (UTC+1) | Ramović (yellow card) 27'; Moen (yellow card) 70'; Stoor (yellow card) 78' | Summary | | Stadium: Åråsen Stadion; Attendance: 4,886; Referee: Trygve Kjensli |

==== Table ====
| Pos | Team | Pld | W | D | L | GF | GA | GD | Pts |
|---|---|---|---|---|---|---|---|---|---|
| 5 | Viking | 30 | 14 | 7 | 9 | 41 | 36 | +5 | 49 |
| 6 | Brann | 30 | 13 | 3 | 14 | 57 | 50 | +7 | 42 |
| 7 | Haugesund | 30 | 11 | 9 | 10 | 46 | 40 | +6 | 42 |
| 8 | Vålerenga | 30 | 12 | 5 | 13 | 42 | 44 | −2 | 41 |
| 9 | Lillestrøm | 30 | 9 | 12 | 9 | 46 | 47 | −1 | 39 |

Source: fotball.no
Rules for classification: 1) points; 2) goal difference; 3) number of goals scored.

=== Norwegian Cup ===
| 1 May 2012 First Round | Avaldsnes | 1–7 | Haugesund | Avaldsnes |
| 18:00 CEST (UTC+2) | K.Boe 14' (pen.); E.Langåker (yellow card) 43' | Summary | Fevang 7', 38'; Jóhannesson 35', 46'; Storbæk 39'; Bjørnbak 59'; Aasheim (yellow card) 64'; Anyora 90+1' (pen.) | Stadium: Avaldsnes Idrettssenter; Attendance: 1,182; Referee: Anders Birch Hansen |

| 9 May 2012 Second Round | Staal Jørpeland | 1–5 | Haugesund | Jørpeland |
| 18:00 CEST (UTC+2) | K.Ramsland (yellow card) 20'; A.Dalehaug 60' | Summary | Skartun 5'; Fevang 40'; Đurđić 53' (pen.); Anyora (yellow card) 58'; Sema 70'; Nilsen 89' | Stadium: Jørpeland stadium Attendance: 1,870; Referee: Jan Morten Tennøy |

| 20 June 2012 Third Round | Haugesund | 8–2 | Egersund | Haugesund |
| 18:00 CEST (UTC+2) | Haukås 2'; Søderlund 3', 10'; Sema 22'; Đurđić 31', 37'; Storbæk 49'; Anyora 62' | Summary | M.Perttamo 66'; M.Håland 86' | Stadium: Haugesund stadion Attendance: 1,103; Referee: Ole Gya |

| 4 July 2012 Fourth Round | Odd Grenland | 0–2 | Haugesund | Skien |
| 18:00 CEST (UTC+2) | | Summary | Đurđić (yellow card) 37'; Sema 50'; Jóhannesson (yellow card) 65'; Mæland (yellow card) 90'; Skartun 90+2' | Stadium: Skagerak Arena; Attendance: 2,468; Referee: Ken Henry Johnsen |

| 18 August 2012 Quarterfinal | Haugesund | 2–2 (a.e.t.) (4–5 p) | Hødd | Haugesund |
| 20:00 CEST (UTC+2) | Osmanagić (yellow card) 26'; Đurđić 46' (pen.), 62'; Nygaard (yellow card) 53' | Summary | Helland 32', 49' | Stadium: Haugesund stadion Attendance: 3,124; Referee: Ken Henry Johnsen |
| | Penalties |
| | Kristiansen (penalty scored); Haukås (penalty scored); Søderlund (penalty missed); Đurđić (penalty scored); Strobæk (penalty scored); Bjørnbak (penalty missed) | | (penalty scored) Latifu; (penalty scored) Nilsen; (penalty missed) Helland; (penalty scored) Sandal; (penalty scored) Karlsen; (penalty scored) Nyland |

== Squad statistics ==
=== Appearances and goals ===
| No. | Pos | Nat | Player | Total | | Tippeligaen | | Norwegian Football Cup | |
| No. | Pos | Nat | Player | Apps | Goals | Apps | Goals | Apps | Goals |
|---|---|---|---|---|---|---|---|---|---|
| 1 | GK | (Norway) NOR | Per Morten Kristiansen | 33 | 0 | 30 | 0 | 3 | 0 |
| 2 | DF | (Norway) NOR | Joakim Våge Nilsen | 24 | 1 | 18+3 | 0 | 2+1 | 1 |
| 3 | DF | (Sweden) SWE | David Myrestam | 9 | 2 | 9 | 2 | 0 | 0 |
| 5 | MF | (Norway) NOR | Trygve Nygaard | 21 | 0 | 19+1 | 0 | 1 | 0 |
| 6 | MF | (Norway) NOR | Håvard Storbæk | 26 | 4 | 10+11 | 2 | 3+2 | 2 |
| 7 | FW | (Norway) NOR | Oddbjørn Skartun | 13 | 2 | 2+7 | 0 | 2+2 | 2 |
| 8 | MF | (Norway) NOR | Michael Haukås | 25 | 4 | 14+8 | 3 | 2+1 | 1 |
| 9 | FW | (Norway) NOR | Alexander Søderlund | 32 | 12 | 29 | 10 | 3 | 2 |
| 10 | MF | (Sierra Leone) SLE | Umaru Bangura | 30 | 0 | 29 | 0 | 1 | 0 |
| 11 | DF | (Norway) NOR | Tor Arne Andreassen | 16 | 2 | 10+5 | 2 | 1 | 0 |
| 12 | GK | (Norway) NOR | Lars Øvernes | 2 | 0 | 0 | 0 | 2 | 0 |
| 13 | MF | (Norway) NOR | Eirik Mæland | 17 | 1 | 8+7 | 1 | 1+1 | 0 |
| 14 | DF | (Iceland) ISL | Andrés Már Jóhannesson | 13 | 2 | 7+2 | 0 | 4 | 2 |
| 15 | DF | (Norway) NOR | Martin Bjørnbak | 22 | 1 | 16+1 | 0 | 5 | 1 |
| 16 | MF | (Nigeria) NGR | Ugonna Anyora | 25 | 2 | 17+5 | 0 | 3 | 2 |
| 17 | MF | (Norway) NOR | Geir Ludvig Fevang | 28 | 10 | 22+2 | 7 | 4 | 3 |
| 18 | MF | (Norway) NOR | Vegard Skjerve | 30 | 0 | 27 | 0 | 2+1 | 0 |
| 19 | MF | (Norway) NOR | Kristoffer Haraldseid | 12 | 0 | 3+6 | 0 | 3 | 0 |
| 20 | FW | (Sweden) SWE | Maic Sema | 28 | 5 | 18+5 | 2 | 4+1 | 3 |
| 21 | FW | (Sweden) SWE | Pontus Engblom | 13 | 2 | 9+3 | 2 | 0+1 | 0 |
| 25 | FW | (Norway) NOR | Henrik Kjelsrud Johansen | 9 | 1 | 2+7 | 1 | 0 | 0 |
| 26 | MF | (Norway) NOR | Tom Undheim | 1 | 0 | 0 | 0 | 0+1 | 0 |
| 27 | FW | (Norway) NOR | Tor André Aasheim | 2 | 0 | 0 | 0 | 0+2 | 0 |
| 30 | MF | (Norway) NOR | Fredrik Deilkås | 1 | 0 | 0 | 0 | 0+1 | 0 |
| | DF | (Norway) NOR | Bjørn Inge Utvik | 1 | 0 | 0 | 0 | 1 | 0 |
| | DF | (Norway) NOR | Morten Bådsvik | 1 | 0 | 0 | 0 | 1 | 0 |
Players away from Haugesund on loan:
| 4 | DF | (Canada) CAN | Chris Pozniak | 2 | 0 | 1 | 0 | 0+1 | 0 |
| 44 | FW | (Serbia) SRB | Nikola Đurđić | 21 | 17 | 17 | 12 | 4 | 5 |
Players who appeared for Haugesund no longer at the club:
| 3 | DF | (France) FRA | Derek Decamps | 15 | 1 | 11+2 | 1 | 2 | 0 |
| 22 | MF | (Bosnia and Herzegovina) BIH | Amer Osmanagić | 3 | 1 | 2 | 1 | 1 | 0 |

=== Goal scorers ===
| Place | Position | Nation | Number | Name | Tippeligaen | Norwegian Cup | Total |
|---|---|---|---|---|---|---|---|
| 1 | FW | (Serbia) | 44 | Nikola Đurđić | 12 | 5 | 17 |
| 2 | FW | (Norway) | 9 | Alexander Søderlund | 10 | 2 | 12 |
| 3 | MF | (Norway) | 17 | Geir Ludvig Fevang | 7 | 3 | 10 |
| 4 | FW | (Sweden) | 20 | Maic Sema | 2 | 3 | 5 |
| 5 | MF | (Norway) | 8 | Michael Haukås | 3 | 1 | 4 |
| 5 | MF | (Norway) | 6 | Håvard Storbæk | 2 | 2 | 4 |
| 7 | DF | (Norway) | 11 | Tor Arne Andreassen | 2 | 0 | 2 |
| 7 | FW | (Sweden) | 21 | Pontus Engblom | 2 | 0 | 2 |
| 7 | DF | (Sweden) | 3 | David Myrestam | 2 | 0 | 2 |
| 7 | DF | (Iceland) | 14 | Andrés Már Jóhannesson | 0 | 2 | 2 |
| 7 | MF | (Nigeria) | 16 | Ugonna Anyora | 0 | 2 | 2 |
| 7 | FW | (Norway) | 7 | Oddbjørn Skartun | 0 | 2 | 2 |
| 12 | DF | (France) | 3 | Derek Decamps | 1 | 0 | 1 |
| 12 | MF | (Bosnia and Herzegovina) | 22 | Amer Osmanagić | 1 | 0 | 1 |
| 12 | MF | (Norway) | 13 | Eirik Mæland | 1 | 0 | 1 |
| 12 | FW | (Norway) | 25 | Henrik Kjelsrud Johansen | 1 | 0 | 1 |
| 12 | DF | (Norway) | 15 | Martin Bjørnbak | 0 | 1 | 1 |
| 12 | DF | (Norway) | 2 | Joakim Våge Nilsen | 0 | 1 | 1 |
| | | | | TOTALS | 46 | 24 | 70 |

=== Disciplinary record ===
| Number | Nation | Position | Name | Tippeligaen | | Norwegian Cup | | Total | |
| Number | Nation | Position | Name | Yellow card | Red card | Yellow card | Red card | Yellow card | Red card |
| 2 | (Norway) | DF | Joakim Våge Nilsen | 2 | 0 | 0 | 0 | 2 | 0 |
| 3 | (France) | DF | Derek Decamps | 1 | 0 | 0 | 0 | 1 | 0 |
| 3 | (Sweden) | DF | David Myrestam | 1 | 0 | 0 | 0 | 1 | 0 |
| 5 | (Norway) | MF | Trygve Nygaard | 2 | 0 | 1 | 0 | 3 | 0 |
| 6 | (Norway) | MF | Håvard Storbæk | 1 | 0 | 0 | 0 | 1 | 0 |
| 8 | (Norway) | MF | Michael Haukås | 1 | 0 | 0 | 0 | 1 | 0 |
| 9 | (Norway) | FW | Alexander Søderlund | 4 | 0 | 0 | 0 | 4 | 0 |
| 10 | (Sierra Leone) | MF | Umaru Bangura | 4 | 0 | 0 | 0 | 4 | 0 |
| 11 | (Norway) | DF | Tor Arne Andreassen | 1 | 0 | 0 | 0 | 1 | 0 |
| 13 | (Norway) | MF | Eirik Mæland | 0 | 0 | 1 | 0 | 1 | 0 |
| 14 | (Iceland) | DF | Andrés Már Jóhannesson | 0 | 0 | 1 | 0 | 1 | 0 |
| 15 | (Norway) | DF | Martin Bjørnbak | 2 | 1 | 0 | 0 | 2 | 1 |
| 16 | (Nigeria) | MF | Ugonna Anyora | 2 | 0 | 1 | 0 | 3 | 0 |
| 17 | (Norway) | MF | Geir Ludvig Fevang | 3 | 0 | 0 | 0 | 3 | 0 |
| 18 | (Norway) | MF | Vegard Skjerve | 5 | 0 | 0 | 0 | 5 | 0 |
| 21 | (Sweden) | FW | Pontus Engblom | 1 | 0 | 0 | 0 | 1 | 0 |
| 22 | (Bosnia and Herzegovina) | MF | Amer Osmanagić | 0 | 0 | 1 | 0 | 1 | 0 |
| 27 | (Norway) | FW | Tor André Aasheim | 0 | 0 | 1 | 0 | 1 | 0 |
| 44 | (Serbia) | FW | Nikola Đurđić | 4 | 0 | 1 | 0 | 5 | 0 |
| | | | TOTALS | 34 | 1 | 7 | 0 | 41 | 1 |
