= 2013 FK Haugesund season =

Haugesund
2013 season
- Chairman: Leif Helge Kaldheim
- Manager: Jostein Grindhaug
- Stadium: Haugesund Stadion
- Tippeligaen: 3rd
- Norwegian Cup: Semi-finals vs Rosenborg
- Top goalscorer: League: Christian Gytkjær (11); All: Christian Gytkjær (15)
- Highest home attendance: 7,889 vs Odds; 3 November 2013
- Lowest home attendance: 2,483 vs Alta; 19 June 2013
- Average home league attendance: 4,827; 13 November 2013
Home colours	Away colours

The 2013 season was FK Haugesund's 4th season back in the Tippeligaen since their promotion in 2009 and their fifth season with Jostein Grindhaug as manager. They participated in the Tippeligaen finishing third, qualifying for the first qualifying round of the 2014–15 UEFA Europa League. They also reached the Semi-finals of the Cup, where they lost to Rosenborg.

== Squad ==
Note: Flags indicate national team as defined under FIFA eligibility rules; some limited exceptions apply. Players may hold more than one non-FIFA nationality.

No.	Pos.	Nation	Player
1	GK	NOR	Per Morten Kristiansen (captain)
2	DF	NOR	Joakim Våge Nilsen
3	DF	SWE	David Myrestam
4	DF	DEN	Henrik Kildentoft
5	MF	NOR	Trygve Nygaard
7	FW	DEN	Christian Gytkjær
8	MF	NOR	Michael Haukås
10	MF	SLE	Umaru Bangura
11	DF	NOR	Tor Arne Andreassen
12	GK	NOR	Olav Dalen

No.	Pos.	Nation	Player
13	MF	NOR	Eirik Mæland
15	DF	NOR	Martin Bjørnbak
16	MF	NGR	Ugonna Anyora
17	MF	NOR	Geir Ludvig Fevang
18	DF	NOR	Vegard Skjerve
19	MF	NOR	Kristoffer Haraldseid
23	MF	BRA	Daniel Bamberg
25	FW	NOR	Henrik Kjelsrud Johansen
50	DF	SRB	Dušan Cvetinović

=== Out on loan ===
Note: Flags indicate national team as defined under FIFA eligibility rules; some limited exceptions apply. Players may hold more than one non-FIFA nationality.

No.	Pos.	Nation	Player
14	DF	ISL	Andrés Már Jóhannesson (on loan to Fylkir)
20	FW	SWE	Maic Sema (on loan to MVV)

No.	Pos.	Nation	Player
21	FW	SWE	Pontus Engblom (on loan to Sundsvall)

== Transfers ==
=== Winter ===
In: Note: Flags indicate national team as defined under FIFA eligibility rules; some limited exceptions apply. Players may hold more than one non-FIFA nationality.

No.	Pos.	Nation	Player
4	DF	DEN	Henrik Kildentoft (from (Denmark) Nordsjælland)
7	FW	DEN	Christian Gytkjær (from (Denmark) Nordsjælland)
12	GK	NOR	Olav Dalen (from (Norway) Nybergsund)
23	MF	BRA	Daniel Bamberg (from (Sweden) Örebro)

Out: Note: Flags indicate national team as defined under FIFA eligibility rules; some limited exceptions apply. Players may hold more than one non-FIFA nationality.

No.	Pos.	Nation	Player
4	DF	CAN	Chris Pozniak (Retired)
6	MF	NOR	Håvard Storbæk (to (Norway) Odds)
7	FW	NOR	Oddbjørn Skartun (to (Norway) Bryne)
12	GK	NOR	Lars Øvernes (to (Norway) HamKam)
44	FW	SRB	Nikola Đurđić (to (Germany) SpVgg Greuther Fürth)
—	MF	BIH	Amer Osmanagić (released)

=== Summer ===
In: Note: Flags indicate national team as defined under FIFA eligibility rules; some limited exceptions apply. Players may hold more than one non-FIFA nationality.

No.	Pos.	Nation	Player
50	DF	SRB	Dušan Cvetinović (from (Liechtenstein) FC Vaduz)

Out: Note: Flags indicate national team as defined under FIFA eligibility rules; some limited exceptions apply. Players may hold more than one non-FIFA nationality.

No.	Pos.	Nation	Player
9	FW	NOR	Alexander Søderlund (to (Norway) Rosenborg)
14	DF	ISL	Andrés Már Jóhannesson (on loan to (Iceland) Fylkir)
20	FW	SWE	Maic Sema (on loan to (Netherlands) MVV)
21	FW	SWE	Pontus Engblom (on loan to (Sweden) Sundsvall)

== Competitions ==
=== Tippeligaen ===
==== Results summary ====
Overall								Home						Away					
Pld	W	D	L	GF	GA	GD	Pts	W	D	L	GF	GA	GD	W	D	L	GF	GA	GD
30	15	6	9	41	39	+2	51	10	2	3	25	15	+10	5	4	6	16	24	−8

==== Results by round ====
Round	1	2	3	4	5	6	7	8	9	10	11	12	13	14	15	16	17	18	19	20	21	22	23	24	25	26	27	28	29	30
Ground	A	A	A	H	H	A	H	A	H	A	H	A	H	A	H	H	A	H	H	A	H	A	H	A	H	A	H	A	H	A
Result	L	D	W	W	W	L	L	D	W	W	L	L	W	L	W	L	D	W	W	W	W	L	D	D	D	W	W	W	W	L
Position	16	15	13	10	8	7	9	9	8	5	5	6	6	7	6	6	6	5	5	5	4	5	5	5	5	4	3	3	3	3

Updated to match(es) played on 10 November 2013. Source: see below
A = Away; H = Home; W = Win; D = Draw; L = Loss

==== Results ====
16 March 2013 1	Aalesund	3–0	Haugesund	Ålesund
15:30 CET (UTC+1)	Stewart 9'; Barrantes 36', 41'	Summary		Stadium: Color Line Stadion; Attendance: 6,925; Referee: Espen Berntsen

7 April 2013 3	Sandnes Ulf	1–1	Haugesund	Sandnes
CEST (UTC+2)	Frejd 52'	Summary	Sema 17' (pen.)	Stadium: Sandnes Idrettspark; Attendance: 3,185; Referee: Ken Henry Johnsen

14 April 2013 4	Hønefoss	0–1	Haugesund	Hønefoss
18:00 CEST (UTC+2)		Summary	Gytkjær 84'	Stadium: Aka Arena; Attendance: 2,247; Referee: Trygve Kjensli

21 April 2013 5	Haugesund	3–1	Rosenborg	Haugesund
19:00 CET (UTC+1)	Bamberg 15' (pen.); Søderlund 35'; Andreassen 89'	Summary	Diskerud 51'; Gamboa (yellow card) 25' (yellow-red card) 66'	Stadium: Haugesund Stadion; Attendance: 5,391; Referee: Kjetil Sælen

24 April 2013 2	Haugesund	3–2	Start	Haugesund
18:30 CEST (UTC+2)	Gytkjær 34', 51'; Andreassen 46'	Summary	Castro 45', 77'	Stadium: Haugesund Stadion; Attendance: 4,648; Referee: Kristoffer Helgerud

28 April 2013 6	Tromsø	2–1	Haugesund	Tromsø
18:00 CEST (UTC+2)	Johansen 20'; Ondrášek 62'	Summary	Kildentoft 79'	Stadium: Alfheim Stadion; Attendance: 4,166; Referee: Trond Ivar Døvle

5 May 2013 7	Haugesund	0–1	Sarpsborg 08	Haugesund
18:00 CEST (UTC+2)		Summary	Olsen 85'	Stadium: Haugesund Stadion; Attendance: 4,268; Referee: Dag Vidar Hafsås

9 May 2013 8	Viking	0–0	Haugesund	Stavanger
15:30 CEST (UTC+2)		Summary		Stadium: Viking Stadion; Attendance: 12,024; Referee: Trond Ivar Døvle

12 May 2013 9	Haugesund	1–0	Vålerenga	Haugesund
15:30 CEST (UTC+2)	Søderlund 82'	Summary		Stadium: Haugesund Stadion; Attendance: 4,452; Referee: Kristoffer Helgerud

16 May 2013 10	Molde	1–5	Haugesund	Molde
18:00 CEST (UTC+2)	Vatshaug 5'	Summary	Gytkjær 1', 42', 84' (pen.); Søderlund 47'; Haukås 59'	Stadium: Aker Stadion; Attendance: 8,878; Referee: Dag Vidar Hafsås

20 May 2013 11	Haugesund	0–1	Sogndal	Haugesund
18:00 CEST (UTC+2)		Summary	Mane 69' (pen.)	Stadium: Haugesund Stadion; Attendance: 4,661; Referee: Omar Rafiq

26 May 2013 12	Lillestrøm	3–0	Haugesund	Lillestrøm
15:30 CEST (UTC+2)	Riise 3'; Gulbrandsen 63'; Knudtzon 88'	Summary		Stadium: Åråsen Stadion; Attendance: 4,106; Referee: Kristoffer Helgerud

23 June 2013 13	Haugesund	2–1	Brann	Haugesund
19:00 CEST (UTC+2)	Bamberg 3', 60'	Summary	Askar 90+1'	Stadium: Haugesund Stadion; Attendance: 5,152; Referee: Brage Sandmoen

30 June 2013 14	Odd	4–0	Haugesund	Skien
18:00 CEST (UTC+2)	Storbæk 46'; Shala 59'; Johnsen 88'; White 90+4'	Summary	Anyora (red card) 57'	Stadium: Skagerak Arena; Attendance: 5,197; Referee: Dag Vidar Hafsås

6 July 2013 15	Haugesund	2–1	Strømsgodset	Haugesund
18:00 CEST (UTC+2)	Hamoud 23' (o.g.); Haukås 66'	Summary	Ovenstad 83'	Stadium: Haugesund Stadion; Attendance: 4,273; Referee: Per Ivar Staberg

14 July 2013 16	Haugesund	1–2	Aalesund	Haugesund
15:30 CEST (UTC+2)	Bamberg 34'; Haukås (yellow card) 64' (yellow-red card) 90'; Gytkjær (yellow card) 90+3'	Summary	Larsen 25'; Phillips (yellow card) 39'; Carlsen 60'; James (yellow card) 85'	Stadium: Haugesund Stadion; Attendance: 4,631; Referee: Svein Edvartsen

28 July 2013 17	Sogndal	1–1	Haugesund	Sogndalsfjøra
18:00 CEST (UTC+2)	Mane 90+1' (pen.)	Summary	Haraldseid 74'	Stadium: Fosshaugane Campus; Attendance: 3,348; Referee: Ola Hobber Nilsen

4 August 2013 18	Haugesund	3–1	Sandnes Ulf	Haugesund
18:00 CEST (UTC+2)	Bamberg 7'; Cvetinović 30'; Myrestam 76'	Summary	Torsteinbø 3'; Furebotn (red card) 41'	Stadium: Haugesund Stadion; Attendance: 4,347; Referee: Ken Henry Johnsen

11 August 2013 19	Haugesund	1–0	Hønefoss	Haugesund
18:00 CEST (UTC+2)	Gytkjær 12'	Summary	Hoås (yellow card) 45+2' (yellow-red card) 53'	Stadium: Haugesund Stadion; Attendance: 4,686; Referee: Tore Hansen

18 August 2013 20	Start	1–2	Haugesund	Kristiansand
15:30 CEST (UTC+2)	Castro 76'	Summary	Mathisen 40' (o.g.); Gytkjær 42'	Stadium: Sør Arena; Attendance: 5,628; Referee: Trygve Kjensli

25 August 2013 21	Haugesund	1–0	Tromsø	Haugesund
18:00 CEST (UTC+2)	Cvetinović 40'	Summary		Stadium: Haugesund Stadion; Attendance: 4,913; Referee: Ola Hobbber Nilsen

1 September 2013 22	Sarpsborg 08	2–1	Haugesund	Sarpsborg
18:00 CEST (UTC+2)	Tom Erik Breive 66' (yellow card) 69'; Kjetil Berge (yellow card) 86'; Kronberg (yellow card) 86'; Ernemann (yellow card) 89'; Olanare 90'	Summary	Dušan Cvetinović (yellow card) 12'; Bangura (yellow card) 49'; Andreassen 61'	Stadium: Sarpsborg Stadion; Attendance: 3,061; Referee: Dag Hafsås

14 September 2013 23	Haugesund	1–1	Viking	Haugesund
18:00 CEST (UTC+2)	Gyan 7' (o.g.); Mæland (yellow card) 48'; Andreassen (yellow card) 88'; Skjerve (yellow card) 90+1'	Summary	Gyan (yellow card) 31'; Danielsen (yellow card) 32'; Skogseid 50'	Stadium: Haugesund Stadion; Attendance: 5,540; Referee: Trond Døvle

20 September 2013 24	Rosenborg	1–1	Haugesund	Trondheim
19:00 CET (UTC+1)	Chibuike 21'	Summary	Nilsen (yellow card) 78'; Gytkjær 84'	Stadium: Lerkendal Stadion; Attendance: 11,236; Referee: Ola Nilsen

29 September 2013 25	Haugesund	1–1	Molde	Haugesund
15:30 CEST (UTC+2)	Nilsen 11'	Summary	Chima 59'; Ekpo (yellow card) 75'; Coly (red card) 88'	Stadium: Haugesund Stadion; Attendance: 5,329; Referee: Tore Hansen

4 October 2013 26	Brann	0–1	Haugesund	Bergen
19:00 CEST (UTC+2)		Summary	Gytkjær 76'; Andreassen (yellow card) 90+3'	Stadium: Brann Stadion; Attendance: 10,229; Referee: Ken Henry Johnsen

20 October 2013 27	Haugesund	3–2	Lillestrøm	Haugesund
18:00 CET (UTC+1)	Haukås 8' (yellow card) 80'; Gytkjær 17'; Nilsen 53'; Andreassen (yellow card) 84'	Summary	Mjelde 23'; Kippe (yellow card) 36'; Moen 46'	Stadium: Haugesund Stadion; Attendance: 6,002; Referee: Kristoffer Helgerud

26 October 2013 28	Vålerenga	1–2	Haugesund	Oslo
15:30 CEST (UTC+2)	Børven 51'	Summary	Cvetinović 60'; Muri 64' (o.g.)	Stadium: Ullevaal Stadion; Attendance: 7,940; Referee: Tommy Skjerven

3 November 2013 29	Haugesund	3–1	Odd	Haugesund
18:00 CEST (UTC+2)	Jonassen 34' (o.g.); Bamberg 37'; Haraldseid 90+3'	Summary	Shala 30'	Stadium: Haugesund Stadion; Attendance: 7,889; Referee: Dag Vidar Hafsås

10 November 2013 30	Strømsgodset	4–0	Haugesund	Drammen
18:00 CET (UTC+1)	Kamara 53', 90'; Johansen 64'; Storflor 69'	Summary	Cvetinović (red card) 55'	Stadium: Marienlyst Stadion; Attendance: 7,544; Referee: Svein Erik Edvartsen

==== Table ====
Pos	Team	Pld	W	D	L	GF	GA	GD	Pts	Qualification or relegation
1	Strømsgodset (C)	30	19	6	5	66	26	+40	63	Qualification for the Champions League second qualifying round
2	Rosenborg	30	18	8	4	50	25	+25	62	Qualification for the Europa League first qualifying round
3	Haugesund	30	15	6	9	41	39	+2	51	Qualification for the Europa League first qualifying round
4	Aalesund	30	14	7	9	55	44	+11	49	
5	Viking	30	12	10	8	41	36	+5	46	

Source: fotball.no
Rules for classification: 1) points; 2) goal difference; 3) number of goals scored.
(C) Champions

=== Norwegian Cup ===
17 April 2013 First round	Brodd	2–5	Haugesund	Storhaug
18:00 CEST (UTC+2)	Olsen 35'; Fiskum 50'	Summary	Aasheim 21'; Johansen 45+1', 54'; Anyora 85'; Sema 90+3'	Stadium: Midjord idrettspark Attendance: 410; Referee: Jørn Voll

1 May 2013 Second round	Nest-Sotra	2–4	Haugesund	Ågotnes
18:00 CEST (UTC+2)	Næss 18'; Lid Kleppe 74'	Report	Haraldseid 36'; Haukås 42'; Anyora 78'; Johansen 90+1'	Stadium: Ågotnes stadion Attendance: 300; Referee: Kristoffer Hagenes

29 May 2013 Third round	Vard Haugesund	2–5	Haugesund	Haugesund
18:00 CEST (UTC+2)	Kapidžić 52'; Miljeteig 90+2'	Report	Gytkjær 7', 31', 60'; Engblom 59', 70'	Stadium: Haugesund Stadion; Attendance: 1,991; Referee: Trond Ivar Døvle

19 June 2013 Fourth round	Haugesund	4–3	Alta	Haugesund
18:00 CEST (UTC+2)	Andreassen 12', 61'; Engblom 55', 57'	Report	Thomassen 37'; Nikolaisen 51'; Ngom 65'	Stadium: Haugesund Stadion; Attendance: 2,483; Referee: Tommy Skjerven

3 July 2013 Quarter-finals	Haugesund	1–1 (a.e.t.) (5–3 p)	Bodø/Glimt	Haugesund
18:00 CEST (UTC+2)	Johansen 90'	Report	Ndiaye 8'	Stadium: Haugesund Stadion; Attendance: 3,390; Referee: Ken Henry Johnsen
	Penalties
	Sema (penalty scored); Bangura (penalty scored); Mæland (penalty scored); Engblom (penalty scored); Kristiansen (penalty scored)		(penalty scored) Johansen; (penalty scored) V. Braaten; (penalty missed) T. Braaten; (penalty scored) Ndiaye

25 September 2013 Semi-finals	Rosenborg	2–1	Haugesund	Trondheim
20:00 CEST (UTC+2)	Mikkelsen 35'; Bille Nielsen 58'	Report	Gytkjær 48'	Stadium: Lerkendal Stadion; Attendance: 8,438; Referee: Brage Sandmoen

== Squad statistics ==
As of 13 November 2013

=== Appearances and goals ===
No.	Pos	Nat	Player	Total		Tippeligaen		Norwegian Cup	
No.	Pos	Nat	Player	Apps	Goals	Apps	Goals	Apps	Goals
1	GK	(Norway) NOR	Per Morten Kristiansen	34	0	30+0	0	4+0	0
2	DF	(Norway) NOR	Joakim Våge Nilsen	14	2	11+2	2	1+0	0
3	DF	(Sweden) SWE	David Myrestam	34	1	29+0	1	5+0	0
4	DF	(Denmark) DEN	Henrik Kildentoft	20	1	16+1	1	3+0	0
5	MF	(Norway) NOR	Trygve Nygaard	21	0	6+12	0	3+0	0
7	FW	(Denmark) DEN	Christian Gytkjær	28	15	24+1	11	3+0	4
8	MF	(Norway) NOR	Michael Haukås	34	4	15+14	3	2+3	1
10	MF	(Sierra Leone) SLE	Umaru Bangura	32	0	27+1	0	3+1	0
11	DF	(Norway) NOR	Tor Arne Andreassen	31	5	24+2	3	5+0	2
12	GK	(Norway) NOR	Olav Dalen	2	0	0+0	0	2+0	0
13	MF	(Norway) NOR	Eirik Mæland	26	0	19+2	0	5+0	0
15	DF	(Norway) NOR	Martin Bjørnbak	13	0	9+0	0	4+0	0
16	MF	(Nigeria) NGR	Ugonna Anyora	25	2	18+2	0	4+1	2
17	MF	(Norway) NOR	Geir Ludvig Fevang	9	0	4+4	0	0+1	0
18	DF	(Norway) NOR	Vegard Skjerve	29	0	25+0	0	4+0	0
19	MF	(Norway) NOR	Kristoffer Haraldseid	32	3	9+17	2	3+3	1
23	MF	(Brazil) BRA	Daniel Bamberg	32	6	28+0	6	4+0	0
25	FW	(Norway) NOR	Henrik Kjelsrud Johansen	19	4	6+8	0	2+3	4
50	DF	(Serbia) SRB	Dušan Cvetinović	15	3	14+0	3	1+0	0
	MF	(Norway) NOR	Tor Andre Skimmeland Aasheim	1	1	0+0	0	1+0	1
	MF	(Norway) NOR	Tom Undheim	1	0	0+0	0	1+0	0
	MF	(Norway) NOR	Fredrik Deilkås	1	0	0+0	0	0+1	0
	FW	(Norway) NOR	Henning Nesse	1	0	0+0	0	0+1	0
Players away from Haugesund on loan:
20	FW	(Sweden) SWE	Maic Sema	5	2	1+1	1	3+0	1
21	FW	(Sweden) SWE	Pontus Engblom	17	4	2+10	0	3+2	4
Players who left Haugesund during the season:
6	MF	(Norway) NOR	Håvard Storbæk	1	0	1+0	0	0+0	0
9	FW	(Norway) NOR	Alexander Søderlund	12	3	12+0	3	0+0	0

=== Goal scorers ===
Place	Position	Nation	Number	Name	Tippeligaen	Norwegian Cup	Total
1	FW	(Denmark)	7	Christian Gytkjær	11	4	15
2	MF	(Brazil)	23	Daniel Bamberg	6	0	6
3	DF	(Norway)	11	Tor Arne Andreassen	3	2	5
3				Own goal	5	0	5
5	MF	(Norway)	8	Michael Haukås	3	1	4
5	FW	(Sweden)	21	Pontus Engblom	0	4	4
5	FW	(Norway)	25	Henrik Kjelsrud Johansen	0	4	4
8	FW	(Norway)	9	Alexander Søderlund	3	0	3
8	DF	(Serbia)	50	Dušan Cvetinović	3	0	3
8	MF	(Norway)	19	Kristoffer Haraldseid	2	1	3
11	DF	(Norway)	2	Joakim Våge Nilsen	2	0	2
11	FW	(Sweden)	20	Maic Sema	1	1	2
11	MF	(Nigeria)	16	Ugonna Anyora	0	2	2
14	DF	(Denmark)	4	Henrik Kildentoft	1	0	1
14	DF	(Sweden)	3	David Myrestam	1	0	1
14	MF	(Norway)		Tor Andre Skimmeland Aasheim	0	1	1
				TOTALS	41	20	61

=== Disciplinary record ===
Number	Nation	Position	Name	Tippeligaen		Norwegian Cup		Total	
Number	Nation	Position	Name	Yellow card	Red card	Yellow card	Red card	Yellow card	Red card
2	(Norway)	DF	Joakim Våge Nilsen	2	0	0	0	2	0
3	(Sweden)	DF	David Myrestam	1	0	0	0	1	0
4	(Denmark)	DF	Henrik Kildentoft	3	0	0	0	3	0
7	(Denmark)	FW	Christian Gytkjær	3	0	1	0	4	0
8	(Norway)	MF	Michael Haukås	4	1	0	0	4	1
9	(Norway)	FW	Alexander Søderlund	1	0	0	0	1	0
10	(Sierra Leone)	MF	Umaru Bangura	3	0	0	0	3	0
11	(Norway)	DF	Tor Arne Andreassen	5	0	1	0	6	0
12	(Norway)	GK	Olav Dalen	0	0	1	0	1	0
13	(Norway)	MF	Eirik Mæland	5	0	0	0	5	0
16	(Nigeria)	MF	Ugonna Anyora	3	1	0	0	3	1
18	(Norway)	DF	Vegard Skjerve	3	0	0	0	3	0
19	(Norway)	MF	Kristoffer Haraldseid	1	0	0	0	1	0
20	(Sweden)	FW	Maic Sema	0	0	2	0	1	0
21	(Sweden)	FW	Pontus Engblom	0	0	1	0	1	0
23	(Brazil)	MF	Daniel Bamberg	2	0	0	0	2	0
50	(Serbia)	DF	Dušan Cvetinović	2	1	0	0	2	1
			TOTALS	38	3	6	0	44	3
