= Erstad =

Erstad is a surname. Notable people with the surname include:

- Darin Erstad (born 1974), American baseball player
- Jacob Erstad (1898–1963), Norwegian gymnast
- Jostein Erstad (1922–2011), Norwegian jurist
- Sindre Erstad (born 1982), Norwegian footballer
