= Espedal (disambiguation) =

Espedal is a place in Fjaler, Norway.

Espedal may also refer to:

== Places ==
- Nedre Espedal, a village in Sandnes Municipality in Rogaland county, Norway
- Øvre Espedal, a village in Sandnes Municipality in Rogaland county, Norway

== People ==
- Ronny Espedal, a Norwegian footballer
- Kristian Espedal or Gaahl, a Norwegian black metal vocalist
- Alf Espedal, an SOE agent
