= Henrik Kjelsrud Johansen =

Norwegian footballer (born 1993)

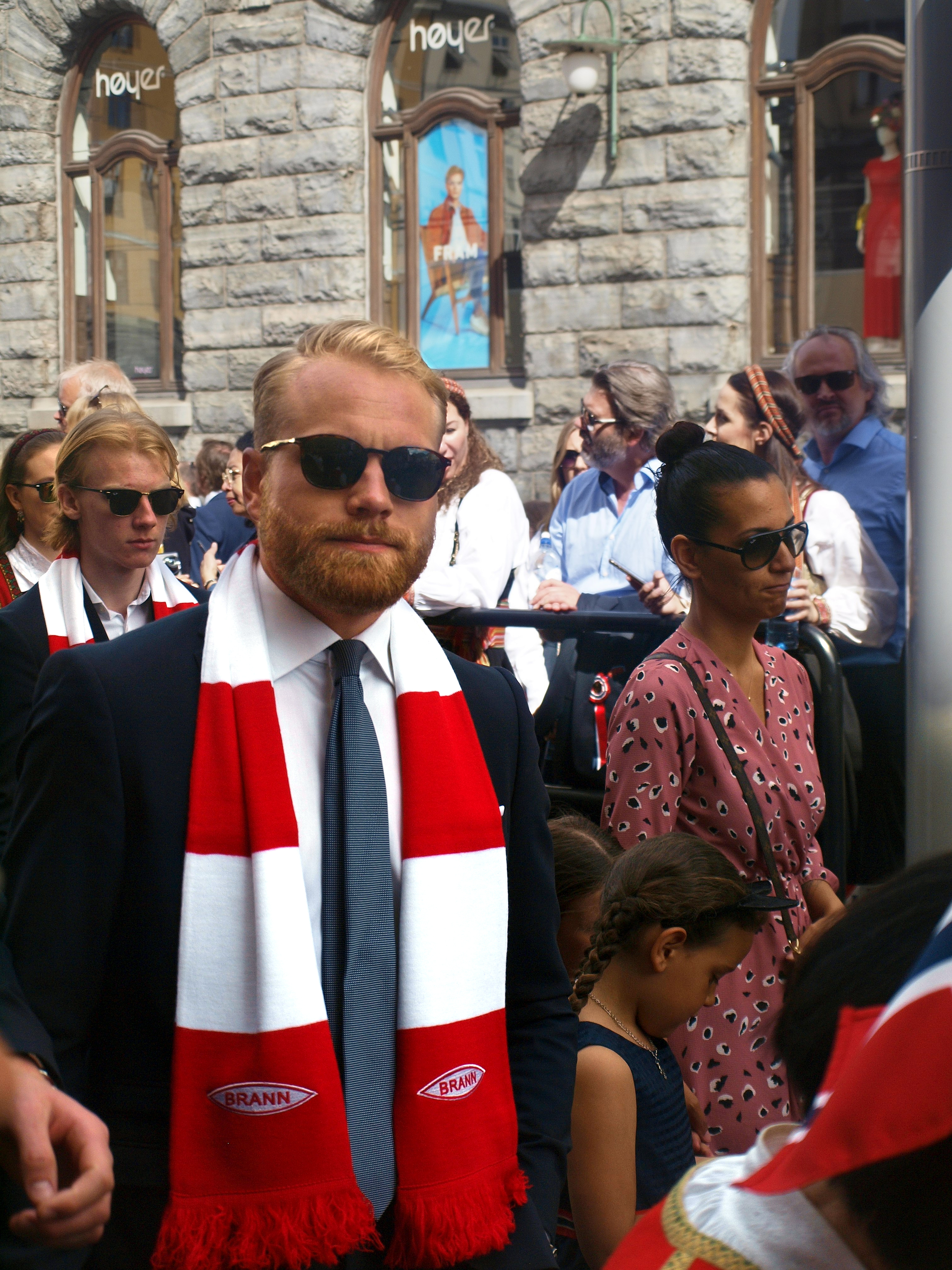

Personal information
- Full name: Henrik Kjelsrud Johansen
- Date of birth: 22 March 1993 (age 33)
- Place of birth: Gjøvik, Norway
- Position: Forward

Senior career*
Years	Team	Apps	(Gls)
2010	Gjøvik	1	(0)
2011–2012	Raufoss	17	(14)
2011	→ Lillestrøm (loan)	4	(0)
2012–2013	Haugesund	23	(1)
2014–2016	Odd	18	(0)
2015	→ Fredrikstad (loan)	19	(11)
2016–2017	Vålerenga	30	(3)
2018–2019	Brann	23	(1)
2019–2024	Fredrikstad	99	(42)

International career^{‡}
2011	Norway U18	5	(3)
2012	Norway U19	6	(0)
2013	Norway U21	2	(0)
- * Club domestic league appearances and goals as of 4 December 2024 ‡ National team caps and goals as of 23 January 2014

Henrik Kjelsrud Johansen (born 22 March 1993) is a former Norwegian footballer who plays as a forward. He previously played for the Eliteserien clubs Lillestrøm, Haugesund, Odd, Vålerenga, Brann and Fredrikstad.

== Club career ==
Hailing from Gjøvik, Johansen played for Gjøvik FF before he joined Raufoss IL ahead of the 2011 season. He was loaned out to Lillestrøm in August 2011, and Johansen played four matches for the club in Tippeligaen but Lillestrøm did not use their option to sign him permanently.

Johansen returned to Raufoss ahead of the 2012 season, and scored 14 goals in 16 matches for the team in the Second Division before he was sold to FK Haugesund in August 2012. Johansen made his debut for Haugesund in the 0–1 loss against Odd in September 2012. He scored his first goal in Tippeligaen in the match against Sandnes Ulf on 23 September 2012. Johansen scored four goals for Haugesund in the 2013 Norwegian Football Cup and played 14 matches in the 2013 Tippeligaen without scoring a goal, when Haugesund won bronze in Tippeligaen.

Ahead of the 2014 season, Johansen transferred to Odd, and their head coach Dag-Eilev Fagermo stated that he had been watching Johansen since Odd met Raufoss in the 2012 Norwegian Football Cup.

In February 2018, Johansen signed for SK Brann for a reported fee around €50 000.

== International career ==
Johansen first represented Norway when he played for the under-18 team in 2011. He has later represented Norway at under-19 and under-21 level.

== Career statistics ==
As of 23 November 2024

Club	Season	League			National cup		Europe		Other		Total	
Club	Season	Division	Apps	Goals	Apps	Goals	Apps	Goals	Apps	Goals	Apps	Goals
Raufoss	2011	2. divisjon	1	0	0	0	—		—		1	0
Raufoss	2012	2. divisjon	16	14	3	0	—		—		19	14
Raufoss	Total		17	14	3	0	—		—		20	14
Lillestrøm (loan)	2011	Tippeligaen	4	0	3	0	—		—		7	0
Haugesund	2012	Tippeligaen	9	1	0	0	—		—		9	1
Haugesund	2013	Tippeligaen	14	0	5	4	—		—		19	4
Haugesund	Total		23	1	5	4	—		—		28	5
Odd	2014	Tippeligaen	8	0	3	2	—		—		11	2
Odd	2016	Tippeligaen	10	0	4	5	4 (Note: Appearances in UEFA Europa League)	0	—		18	5
Odd	Total		18	0	7	7	4	0	—		29	7
Fredrikstad (loan)	2015	1. divisjon	19	11	1	0	—		—		20	11
Vålerenga	2016	Tippeligaen	14	2	1	0	—		—		15	2
Vålerenga	2017	Eliteserien	22	3	5	2	—		—		27	5
Vålerenga	Total		36	5	6	2	—		—		42	7
Brann	2018	Eliteserien	18	1	3	2	—		—		21	3
Brann	2019	Eliteserien	5	0	2	3	—		—		7	3
Brann	Total		23	1	5	5	—		—		28	6
Fredrikstad	2019	2. divisjon	12	12	0	0	—		—		12	12
Fredrikstad	2020	2. divisjon	19	14	—		—		—		19	14
Fredrikstad	2021	1. divisjon	20	7	0	0	—		1 (Note: Appearance in Eliteserien play-offs)	2	21	9
Fredrikstad	2022	1. divisjon	4	1	0	0	—		—		4	1
Fredrikstad	2023	1. divisjon	20	4	2	0	—		—		22	4
Fredrikstad	2024	Eliteserien	23	4	4	2	—		—		27	6
Fredrikstad	Total		98	42	6	2	—		1	2	105	46
Career Total			238	74	35	20	4	0	1	2	278	96

== Honours ==
Fredrikstad

- Norwegian Cup: 2024
