= Fevang FK =

Norwegian football club

- Full name: Fevang Fotballklubb
- Founded: 26 August 1966
- Ground: Fevang Idrettspark; Sandefjord
- League: Fifth Division
- 2011: Sixth Division / Vestfold, 1st (promoted)
| Home colours | Away colours |

Fevang Fotballklubb is a Norwegian association football club from the outskirts of Sandefjord.

The club was established on 26 August 1966 in the small farmer village Fevang about 5 km outside of Sandefjord. The first team are currently playing in the Norwegian Fifth Division (sixth tier), after earning promotion from the Sixth Division in 2011. It played as high as the Third Division in 1997.

Fevang has produced some talents, most notably Geir Ludvig Fevang.

The club colours are black and white, in stripes similar to those of Juventus FC

== Most appearances ==
1. Andre Horntvedt - 300 appearances (as of 2005)
2. John Horntvedt - 275 appearances
3. Bjørn Einar Karlsen - 264 appearances
