= Olav Dalen =

Norwegian football goalkeeper (born 1985)

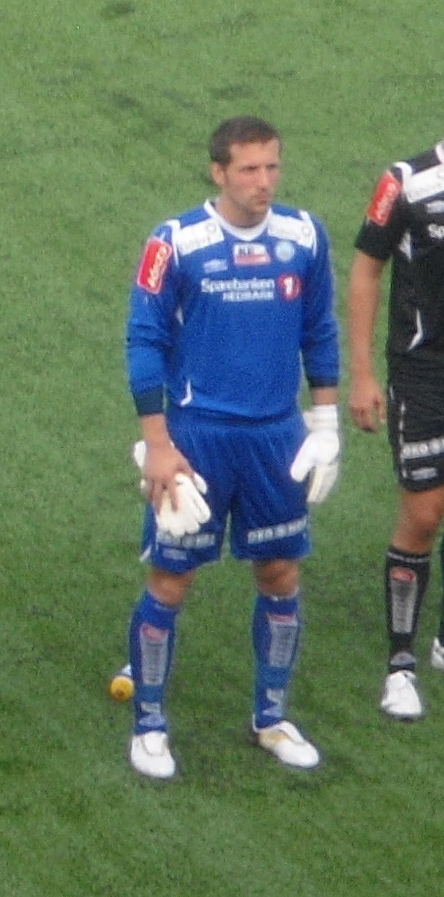

Personal information
- Full name: Olav Baggerud Dalen
- Date of birth: 6 March 1985 (age 41)
- Place of birth: Gjøvik, Norway
- Position: Goalkeeper

Team information
- Current team: Nordre Land

Youth career
- Nordre Land

Senior career*
Years	Team	Apps	(Gls)
–2006	Raufoss		
2007–2008	Ullensaker/Kisa		
2009–2010	Kongsvinger	10	(0)
2011	Randaberg	25	(0)
2012	Nybergsund		
2013–2014	Haugesund	7	(0)
2015–	Nordre Land	0	(0)
- * Club domestic league appearances and goals as of 23 February 2013

Olav Dalen (born 6 March 1985) is a Norwegian football goalkeeper, who play for Nordre Land. He made his debut for Kongsvinger in Tippeligaen in 2010 and has also played for Raufoss, Ullensaker/Kisa, Randaberg, Nybergsund and Haugesund.

== Career ==
Dalen was born in Gjøvik, and grew up in Dokka south of Gjøvik, where he played for Nordre Land. His first professional club was Raufoss, where he played four matches in the First Division in the 2004 season. While playing for the Second Division side Ullensaker/Kisa between 2007 and 2008 he spent time training with Lillestrøm.

Dalen joined Kongsvinger ahead of the 2009 season. Dalen saved a penalty and was named man of the match by a local jury when he made his debut for Kongsvinger against Nybergsund in August 2009. He played a total of three matches for Kongsvinger in 2009. Dalen punctured his lung in March 2009, and was out of play for four weeks. With Thomas Myhre as the only available senior goalkeeper, Kongsvinger considered putting their goalkeeping-coach, Bjørge Fedje, on the bench. Dalen made his debut in the Tippeligaen against Odd Grenland on 29 August 2010. He kept a clean sheet in his debut, a feat he repeated in the next match against Sandefjord. His first conceded goal in Tippeligaen came in his third match, after he passed the ball into Alexander Mathisen's feet when Kongsvinger lost 2–0 against Aalesund. After playing seven league-matches for Kongsvinger, Dalen punctured his lung once more, and was out for the rest of the season, with third-choice Tobias Holmen Johansen playing the team's last two matches.

Dalen's contract with Kongsvinger expired after the 2010 season, and he joined a trial with Tromsø in January 2011, after a recommendation from Frode Grodås, who was Lillestrøm's goalkeeping coach when Dalen was training with Lillestrøm. Dalen did not get a contract with Tromsø, and joined Aalesund's pre-season training camp to La Manga Club. Dalen was not offered a contract with Aalesund, but instead joined the newly promoted First Division side Randaberg, with his new head coach Thomas Pereira claiming that the signing of Dalen was worth between 10 and 12 points for Randaberg in 2011. He played 25 matches and conceded 83 goals in 2011 when Randaberg was relegated from the First Division. Ahead of the 2012 season he transferred to Nybergsund. He joined the Tippeligaen side Haugesund ahead of the 2013 season to challenge the first-choice goalkeeper Per Morten Kristiansen, and signed a two-year contract with the club.

He left Haugesund after the 2014 season when his contract expired.
