= Ahmed Suleiman =

Nigerian footballer

Personal information
- Full name: Ahmed Suleiman
- Date of birth: 18 August 1992 (age 34)
- Place of birth: Jos, Nigeria
- Height: 1.70 m (5 ft 7 in)
- Position: Striker

Senior career*
Years	Team	Apps	(Gls)
2012–2013	Vålerenga	10	(0)
2013	→ Ull/Kisa (loan)	14	(0)
2013–2015	Ull/Kisa	46	(6)
2016	Ljungskile SK	17	(2)
- * Club domestic league appearances and goals as of 26 January 2016

Ahmed Suleiman (born 18 August 1992) is a Nigerian footballer who plays as a striker.

== Club career ==
Suleiman made his debut for Vålerenga on 29 April 2012 against Brann, they won the game 2-1. In 2013, he was loaned out to the Norwegian First Division club Ull/Kisa to July 2013. He signed a permanent deal with Ull/Kisa in August 2013 after his loan spell was over.

== Career statistics ==
As of 11 July 2015

Season	Club	Division	League		Cup		Total	
Season	Club	Division	Apps	Goals	Apps	Goals	Apps	Goals
2012	Vålerenga	Tippeligaen	10	0	1	0	11	0
2013	Ull/Kisa	Adeccoligaen	27	3	3	1	30	4
2014	Ull/Kisa	1. divisjon	19	3	2	0	21	3
2015	Ull/Kisa	2. divisjon	11	3	2	0	13	3
Career Total			67	9	8	1	75	10
