= Dušan Cvetinović =

Serbian footballer

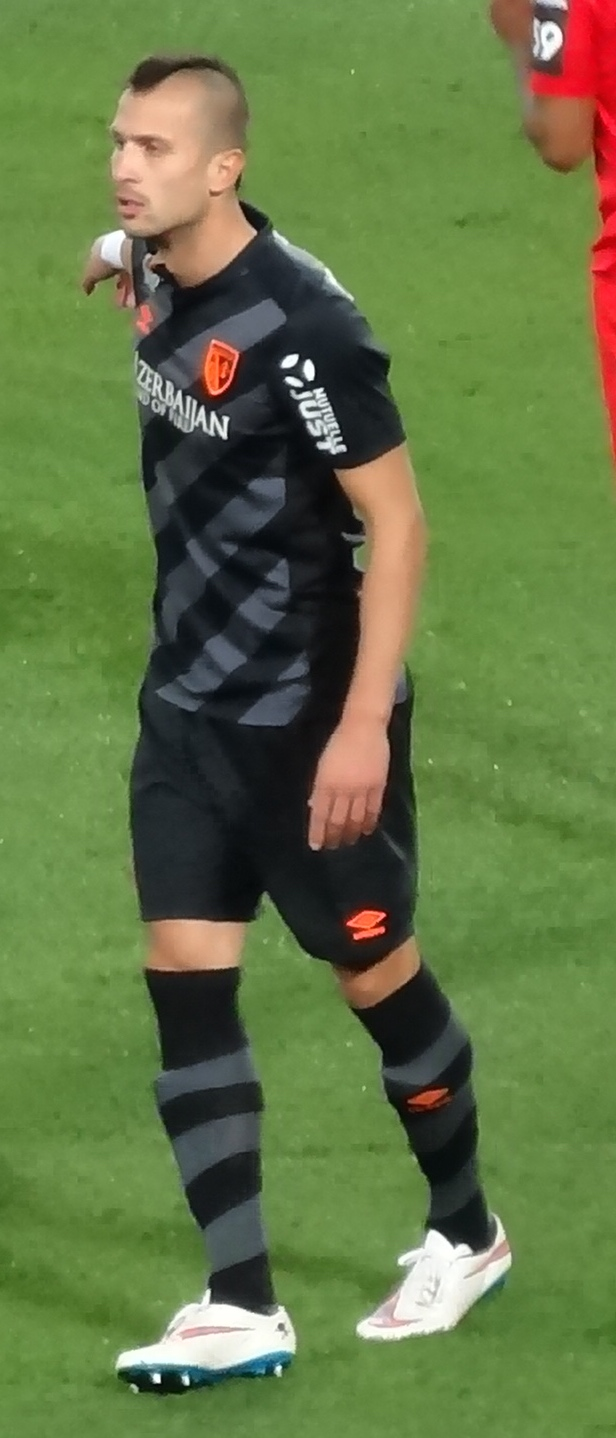
- Cvetinović with Lens in 2015

Personal information
- Full name: Dušan Cvetinović
- Date of birth: 24 December 1988 (age 37)
- Place of birth: Šabac, SFR Yugoslavia
- Height: 1.86 m (6 ft 1 in)
- Position: Centre back

Team information
- Current team: Teleoptik
- Number: 5

Senior career*
| Years | Team | Apps | (Gls) |
| 2006–2007 | Mačva Šabac | 8 | (1) |
| 2007–2008 | Dinamo Vranje | 41 | (1) |
| 2009–2010 | Wohlen | 35 | (0) |
| 2010–2011 | Grasshoppers | 7 | (0) |
| 2011–2013 | Vaduz | 33 | (0) |
| 2013–2016 | Haugesund | 54 | (5) |
| 2015–2016 | → Lens (loan) | 19 | (0) |
| 2016–2018 | Lens | 61 | (6) |
| 2018–2019 | Yokohama F. Marinos | 15 | (1) |
| 2020–2021 | Tokushima Vortis | 23 | (1) |
| 2022 | Radnički 1923 | 15 | (0) |
| 2023 | TSC | 12 | (1) |
| 2024–2026 | Mladost Lučani | 48 | (1) |
| 2026– | Teleoptik | 0 | (0) |
- * Club domestic league appearances and goals as of 13 June 2026

Dušan Cvetinović (Serbian Cyrillic: Душан Цветиновић; born 24 December 1988) is a Serbian professional footballer who plays as a defender for Teleoptik.

== Career ==
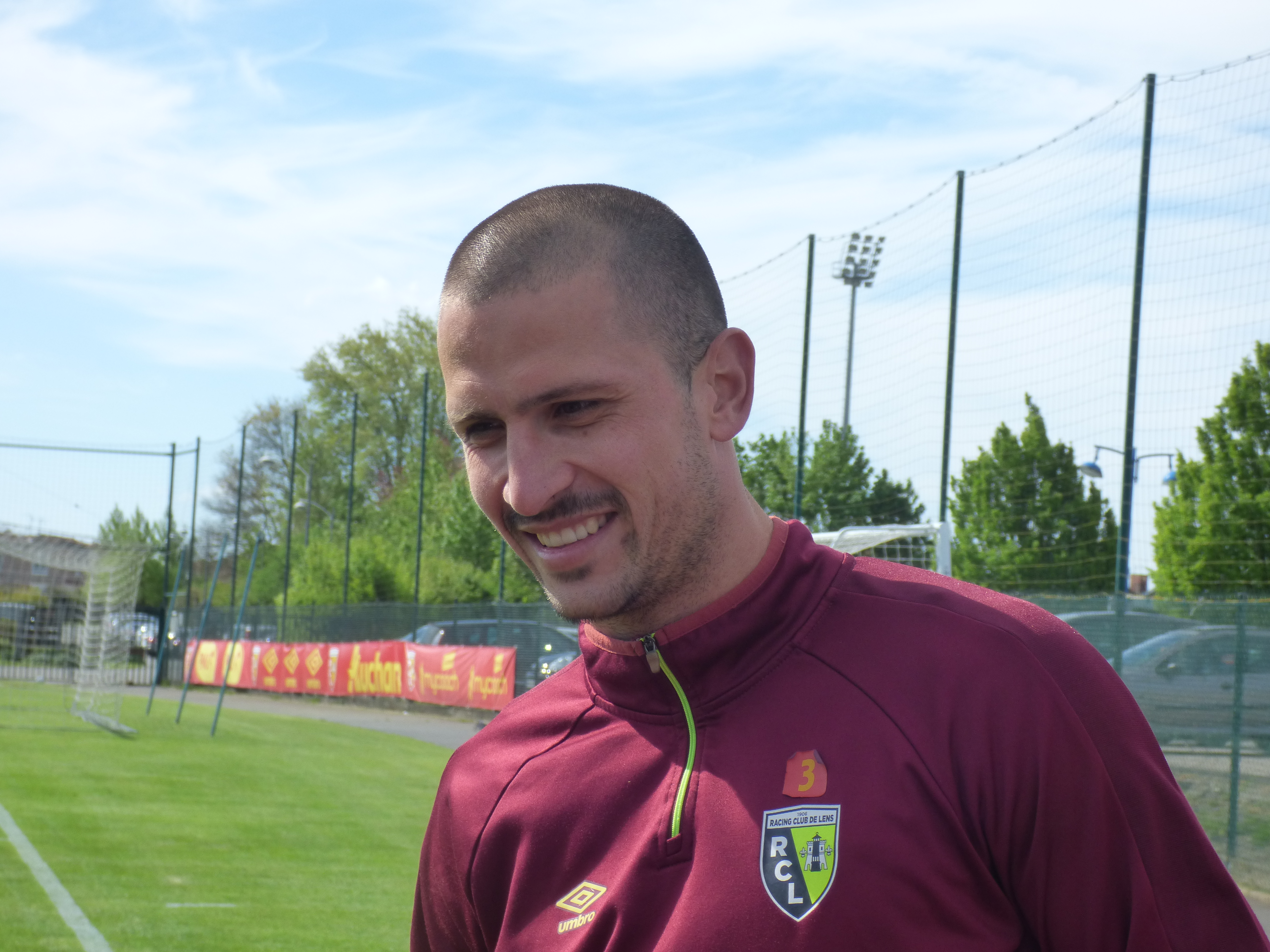
Cvetinović as a member of Lens in 2018

Born in Šabac, Cvetinović made his senior debut at his hometown club Mačva in the 2006–07 season. He then joined Dinamo Vranje, immediately helping the club win promotion to the Serbian First League. Subsequently, he moved abroad and signed with Swiss club Wohlen in the 2009 winter transfer window. He also spent one season at Grasshoppers, before transferring to Vaduz in the summer of 2011.

In July 2013, Cvetinović moved to Norwegian side Haugesund. He scored 3 goals in 14 league appearances until the end of the 2013 season, as the club finished in third place. In the following campaign, he established himself as a regular member of the team's defensive line.

On 18 August 2015, Cvetinović went on a season-long loan to French club Lens, with an option for a permanent deal. He was sent off on his debut for the club in a 1–2 away loss to Dijon three days later. In total, Cvetinović appeared in 19 games for Lens during the 2015–16 season. In the summer of 2016, Cvetinović signed a permanent contract with the French side.

== Career statistics ==
As of 2 December 2018.

Appearances and goals by club, season and competition
| Club | Season | League | | Cup | | League Cup | | Continental | | Total | |
| Club | Season | Apps | Goals | Apps | Goals | Apps | Goals | Apps | Goals | Apps | Goals |
|---|---|---|---|---|---|---|---|---|---|---|---|
| Mačva Šabac | 2006–07 | 8 | 1 | 0 | 0 | – | | – | | 8 | 1 |
| Dinamo Vranje | 2007–08 | 26 | 1 | – | | – | | – | | 26 | 1 |
| Dinamo Vranje | 2008–09 | 15 | 0 | – | | – | | – | | 15 | 0 |
| Dinamo Vranje | Total | 41 | 1 | 0 | 0 | 0 | 0 | 0 | 0 | 41 | 1 |
| Wohlen | 2008–09 | 12 | 0 | 0 | 0 | – | | – | | 12 | 0 |
| Wohlen | 2009–10 | 23 | 0 | 2 | 0 | – | | – | | 25 | 0 |
| Wohlen | Total | 35 | 0 | 2 | 0 | 0 | 0 | 0 | 0 | 37 | 0 |
| Grasshoppers | 2010–11 | 7 | 0 | 1 | 0 | – | | – | | 8 | 0 |
| Vaduz | 2011–12 | 16 | 0 | 0 | 0 | – | | 3 | 1 | 19 | 1 |
| Vaduz | 2012–13 | 17 | 0 | 0 | 0 | – | | – | | 17 | 0 |
| Vaduz | Total | 33 | 0 | 0 | 0 | 0 | 0 | 3 | 1 | 36 | 1 |
| Haugesund | 2013 | 14 | 3 | 1 | 0 | – | | – | | 15 | 3 |
| Haugesund | 2014 | 26 | 2 | 3 | 1 | – | | 3 | 0 | 32 | 3 |
| Haugesund | 2015 | 14 | 0 | 0 | 0 | – | | – | | 14 | 0 |
| Haugesund | Total | 54 | 5 | 4 | 1 | 0 | 0 | 3 | 0 | 61 | 6 |
| Lens | 2015–16 | 19 | 0 | – | | – | | – | | 19 | 0 |
| Lens | 2016–17 | 29 | 4 | 3 | 0 | 1 | 0 | – | | 33 | 4 |
| Lens | 2017–18 | 32 | 2 | 4 | 0 | 1 | 0 | – | | 37 | 2 |
| Lens | Total | 80 | 6 | 7 | 0 | 2 | 0 | 0 | 0 | 89 | 6 |
| Yokohama F. Marinos | 2018 | 14 | 1 | 1 | 0 | 5 | 0 | – | | 20 | 1 |
| Yokohama F. Marinos | 2019 | 0 | 0 | 0 | 0 | 0 | 0 | – | | 0 | 0 |
| Yokohama F. Marinos | Total | 14 | 1 | 1 | 0 | 5 | 0 | 0 | 0 | 20 | 1 |
| Career total | | 272 | 14 | 15 | 1 | 7 | 0 | 6 | 1 | 290 | 16 |
