= Sindre Erstad =

Norwegian footballer (born 1982)

Sindre Erstad (born 25 January 1982) is a Norwegian football defender who currently plays for Norwegian team Radøy/Manger.

He hails from Radøy. His first significant club was Åsane, and went from there to Sogndal. He played sixteen Norwegian Premier League games for the club in 2001, and two in 2003. He later played for Løv-Ham and Stavanger IF. Ahead of the 2009 season he transferred from Randaberg IL to Åsane.
