= Umaru Bangura =

Sierra Leonean footballer (born 1987)

- Bangura with Sierra Leone in 2022

Personal information
- Date of birth: 7 October 1987 (age 39)
- Place of birth: Freetown, Sierra Leone
- Height: 1.83 m (6 ft 0 in)
- Positions: Defender; midfielder

Youth career
- 2004–2005: Mighty Blackpool
- 2005: Watford

Senior career*
Years	Team	Apps	(Gls)
2006–2010	Hønefoss	123	(7)
2010–2013	Haugesund	81	(1)
2014–2016	Dinamo Minsk	58	(0)
2016–2021	Zürich	80	(1)
2021–2022	Neuchâtel Xamax	29	(0)
Total		371	(9)

International career^{‡}
2006–2022	Sierra Leone	53	(4)
- * Club domestic league appearances and goals as of 21 May 2022 ‡ National team caps and goals as of 21:42, 12 January 2022 (UTC)

Umaru Bangura (born 7 October 1987) is a Sierra Leonean former professional footballer who played for the Sierra Leone national team. He played as a central defender or in midfield.

== Career ==
=== Hønefoss ===
Bangura started his senior career with Hønefoss BK in Norway.

=== Haugesund ===
In January 2011, Bangura moved to Eliteserien club FK Haugesund. He made his league debut for the club on 20 March 2011 in a 2–0 away loss to Tromsø IL. He was subbed on in the 71st minute for Ugonna Anyora. He scored his first league goal for the club on 25 September 2011 in a 1–0 home victory over Aalesunds FK. His goal came in the 54th minute.

During the English 2013 summer transfer window, Bangura attracted interest from Premier League side Crystal Palace, but the move failed to materialise.

=== Dinamo Minsk ===
In December 2013, Bangura agreed to move to FC Dinamo Minsk in the Vysheyshaya Liga. He made his league debut for the club on 30 March 2014 in a 1–0 away victory over FC Dnepr Mogilev. He played all ninety minutes of the match.

=== Zürich ===
In August 2016, he signed a three years contract with Swiss club FC Zürich. He made his league debut for the club on 22 August 2016 in a 1–0 home victory over Neuchâtel Xamax. He was subbed on for Armando Sadiku in the 84th minute. He scored his first league goal for the club on 2 October 2016 in a 5–0 away victory over FC Wohlen. His goal, scored in the 61st minute, made the score 4–0 to Zürich.

=== Neuchâtel Xamax ===
On 8 January 2021, it was announced that Bangura had joined Swiss Challenge League club Neuchâtel Xamax on a contract until the end of the season, after being released by Zürich.

== International career ==
Bangura is the captain of the Sierra Leone national team. In October 2019, he stated that he was considering quitting the national team after his team was attacked by angry fans, but retracted his decision soon after and represented Sierra Leone at the 2021 Africa Cup of Nations, the country's first ever AFCON.

== Career statistics ==
=== Club ===
As of match played 17 December 2021

Appearances and goals by club, season and competition
Club	Season	League			Cup		Continental		Play-offs		Total	
Club	Season	Division	Apps	Goals	Apps	Goals	Apps	Goals	Apps	Goals	Apps	Goals
Hønefoss	2006	Adeccoligaen	15	0			—		—		15	1
Hønefoss	2007	Adeccoligaen	23	0			—		—		23	0
Hønefoss	2008	Adeccoligaen	27	2			—		—		27	2
Hønefoss	2009	Adeccoligaen	29	3	1	0	—		—		30	3
Hønefoss	2010	Tippeligaen	29	2	4	1	—		3	0	36	3
Hønefoss	Total		123	7	5	1	0	0	3	0	131	9
Haugesund	2011	Tippeligaen	24	1	4	0	—		—		28	1
Haugesund	2012	Tippeligaen	29	0	1	0	—		—		30	0
Haugesund	2013	Tippeligaen	28	0	4	0	—		—		32	0
Haugesund	Total		81	1	9	0	0	0	0	0	90	1
Dinamo Minsk	2014	Vysheyshaya Liga	23	0	0	0	7	0	—		30	0
Dinamo Minsk	2015	Vysheyshaya Liga	22	0	3	0	12	0	—		37	0
Dinamo Minsk	2016	Vysheyshaya Liga	13	0	4	0	0	0	—		17	0
Dinamo Minsk	Total		58	0	7	0	19	0	0	0	84	0
Zürich	2016–17	Swiss Challenge League	17	1	2	0	3	0	—		22	1
Zürich	2017–18	Swiss Super League	24	0	4	0	—		—		28	0
Zürich	2018–19	Swiss Super League	25	0	2	0	8	0	—		35	0
Zürich	2019–20	Swiss Super League	14	0	1	0	—		—		15	0
Zürich	2020–21	Swiss Super League	0	0	1	0	—		—		1	0
Zürich	Total		80	1	10	0	11	0	0	0	111	1
Neuchâtel Xamax	2020–21	Swiss Challenge League	18	0	0	0	—		—		18	0
Neuchâtel Xamax	2021–22	Swiss Challenge League	3	0	1	0	—		—		4	0
Neuchâtel Xamax	Total		21	0	1	0	0	0	0	0	22	0
Career total			363	9	32	1	30	0	3	0	428	10

=== International ===
As of match played 11 January 2022

Appearances and goals by national team and year
National team	Year	Apps	Goals
Sierra Leone	2006	2	0
Sierra Leone	2007	5	0
Sierra Leone	2008	6	0
Sierra Leone	2010	2	0
Sierra Leone	2011	4	0
Sierra Leone	2012	6	0
Sierra Leone	2013	4	0
Sierra Leone	2014	6	2
Sierra Leone	2015	4	0
Sierra Leone	2016	4	1
Sierra Leone	2017	1	1
Sierra Leone	2019	4	0
Sierra Leone	2020	2	0
Sierra Leone	2021	2	0
Sierra Leone	2022	1	0
Total		53	4

Sierra Leone score listed first, score column indicates score after each Bangura goal

List of international goals scored by Umaru Bangura
No.	Date	Venue	Opponent	Score	Result	Competition	Ref.
1	31 May 2014	National Stadium, Freetown, Sierra Leone	Swaziland	1–0	1–0	2015 Africa Cup of Nations qualification	
2	19 July 2014	National Stadium, Freetown, Sierra Leone	Seychelles	2–0	2–0	2015 Africa Cup of Nations qualification	
3	28 March 2016	National Stadium, Freetown, Sierra Leone	Gabon	1–0	1–0	Friendly	
4	10 June 2017	National Stadium, Freetown, Sierra Leone	Kenya	2–0	2–1	2019 Africa Cup of Nations qualification	

== Honours ==
Order

- Sierra Leone Member of the Order of the Rokel: 2017
