= Haugesund Stadion =

Football stadium in Haugesund, Norway

- Gamlå
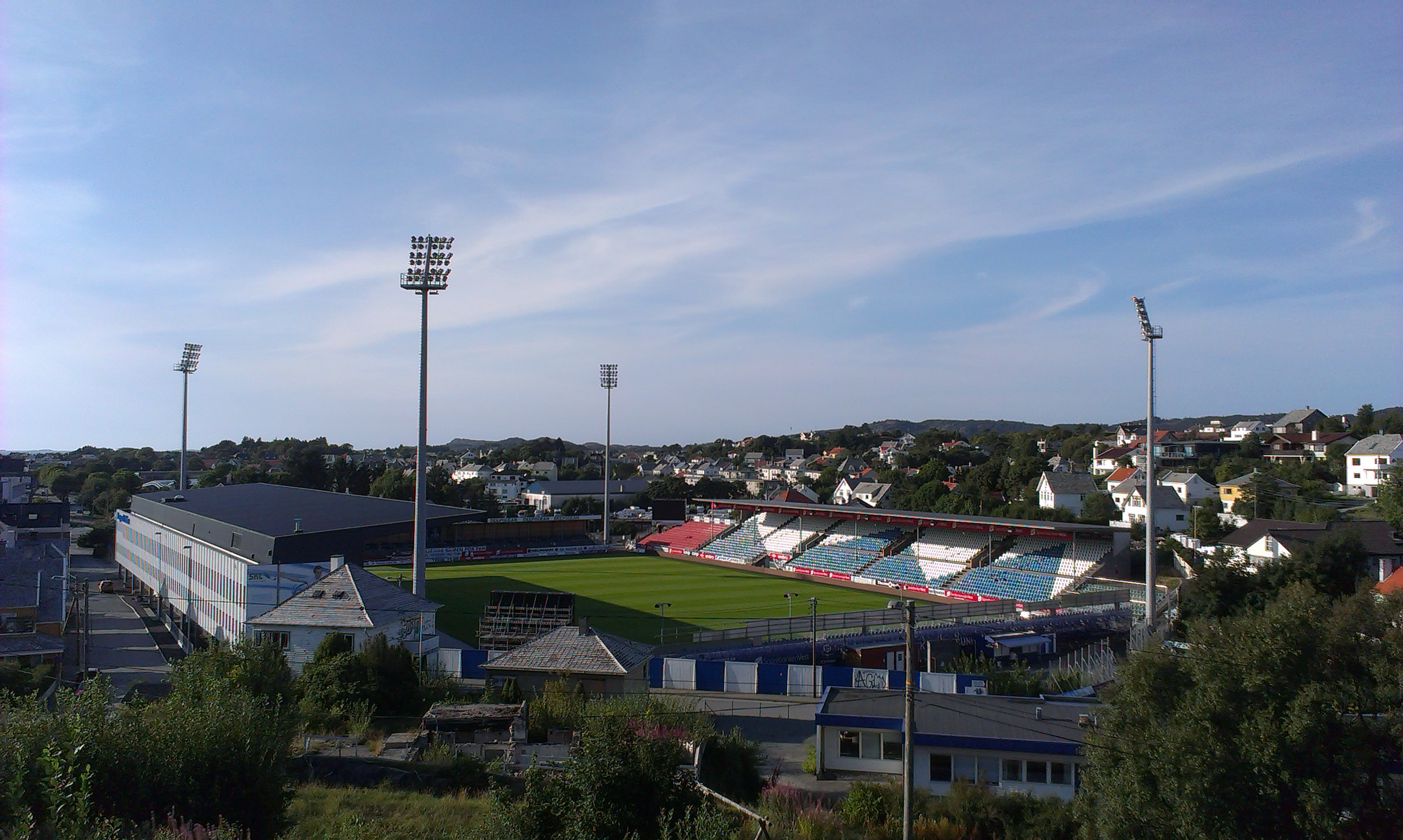
- Interactive map of Haugesund Stadion
- Location: Haugesund, Norway
- Coordinates: 59.413°N 5.279°E
- Owner: FKH AS (60%), Haugesund Kommune (40%)
- Operator: HKFKH AS
- Capacity: 8,703
- Surface: Natural Grass
- Field size: 105 x 68 m

Construction
- Built: 1920
- Expanded: 2013
- Architect: Link Arkitektur

Tenants
- FK Haugesund, Vard Haugesund (football)

Haugesund Stadion, currently named Haugesund Sparebank Arena for sponsorship purposes, is a soccer-specific stadium in Haugesund, Norway. Haugesund Stadion is the home ground of Eliteserien team FK Haugesund and 2. divisjon team SK Vard Haugesund.

== Capacity ==
Stand	Capacity
West Stand (Krafttribunen)	2500
East Stand (Macron-Tribunen)	3254
North Stand (Deep Ocean-tribunen)	2000
South Stand	1000
Haugesund Stadion	8754

== History ==
The first football field in Haugesund was Barneparken, located at the current Rådhusplassen and opened in 1911, costing 400 Norwegian krone. The pitch was uneven, underdimensioned and lacked proper locker rooms. The municipality found the venue unsuitable, and in 1918 bought a parcel of land at Sørhaug from Erik Jacobsen. The venue opened on 17 May 1920, as Haugesund kommunale idrettsplass. However, the municipality did not build a locker room, so the three clubs using the venue, Haugesund IL, SK av 1918 and Vard Haugesund each put up NOK 700 towards new facilities. The structure included a small office, a change room and two showers with only cold water. Djerv 1919 later also became a tenant.

The first stand was completed in 1926, with capacity for 500 spectators. This quickly proved too small, and plans were launched for an expansion. However, this was not completed until 1936, when a larger renovation of the stadium was carried out. The pitch received international measurements and a concrete stand was erected on the east end with space for 700 spectators. A new locker room was also built, regarded among the most modern in the country. However, the stadium retained a gravel field.

There were demands from the clubs that a grass pitch should be installed. The municipal council voted in December 1945 in favor of laying a grass field on the stadium, as well as building a training ground next door at Flotmyr. The upgrades of the main stadium came at NOK 75,000, while the Flotmyr field cost NOK 120,000. The new pitch there was opened in July 1946 with a match between Vard and the Bergen City Team in front of 3,000 spectators. The new grass turf field on the main stadium was opened in August 1948. It also received a new entrance, and the following year stands for a further 500 spectators. The grass and stands were improved several times in the following years and decades. The grass turf on Flotmyr gradually fell into disrepair and was later relegated to a gravel field. The Haugesund Stadion name was adopted in 1968.

Discussions of a new stadium or an upgrade have been carried out since the mid-2000s. In 2005 there was a proposal to build an all-new 8,000-seat stadium at Flotmyr.

In a 2012 survey carried out by the Norwegian Players' Association among away-team captains, Haugesund Stadion was ranked ninth amongst league stadiums, with a score of 3.20 on a scale from one to five. Haugesund Stadion was previously a multi-purpose stadium, but the running track was removed after the 2012 season.

In May 2021, the stadium was renamed Haugesund Sparebank Arena following a sponsorship deal with Haugesund Sparebank.

== Events ==
It was used as an athletics venue for Haugesund IL. The venue hosted the Norwegian Athletics Championships in 1965 and 1981. The record attendance is about 10,000, from a 28 September 1996 match between Haugesund and Sogndal.

The venue has hosted Norway national under-21 football team matches twice, playing 1–2 against Denmark on 23 June 1976 and 1–0 against Portugal on 19 April 1994. As of the end of the 2013 season, Haugesund Stadion has been used for 122 top-league matches. These include 11 games with Djerv 1919 in 1976, Vard in 1988 and FK Haugesund in 1997–98, 2000 and since 2010.

== Gallery ==
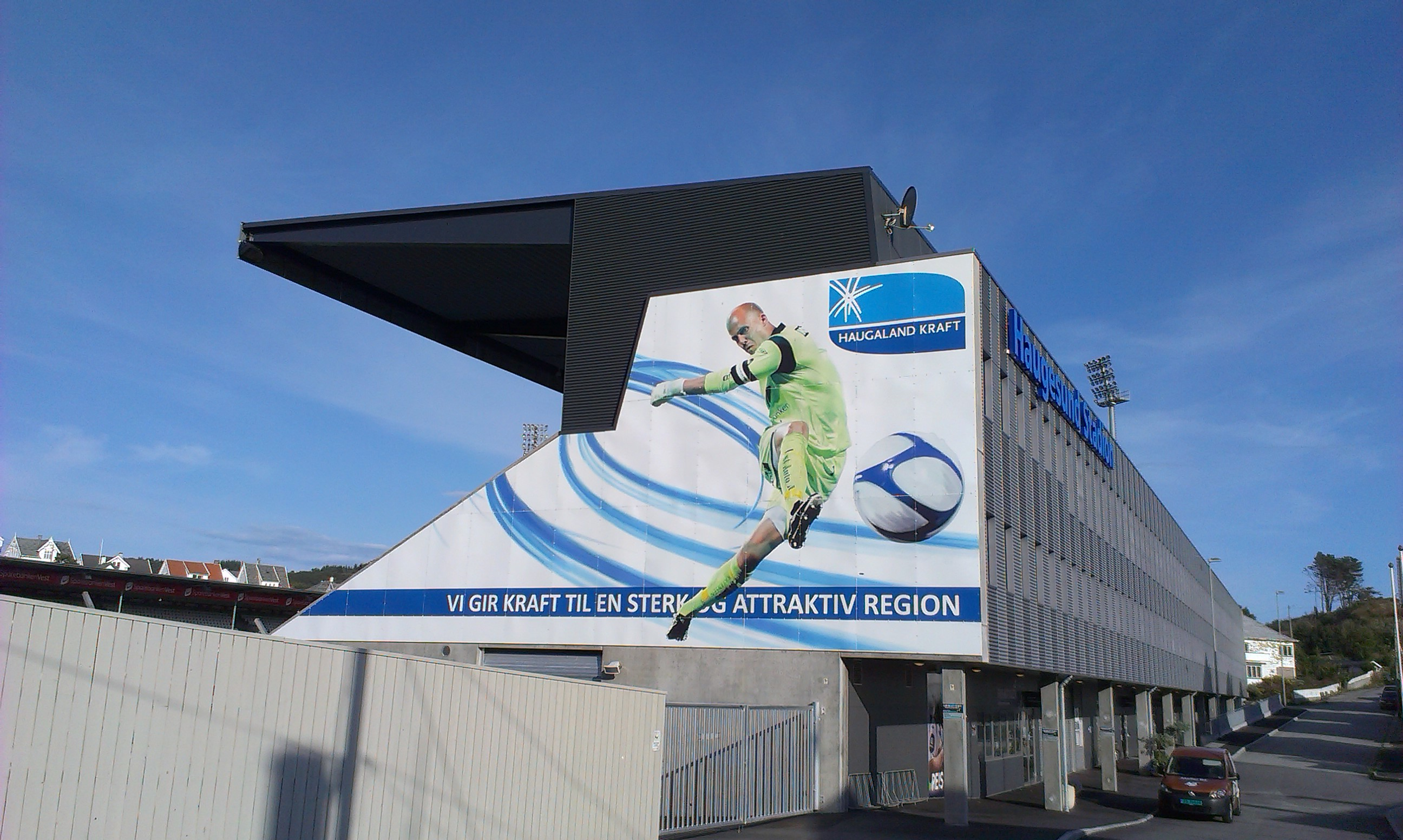

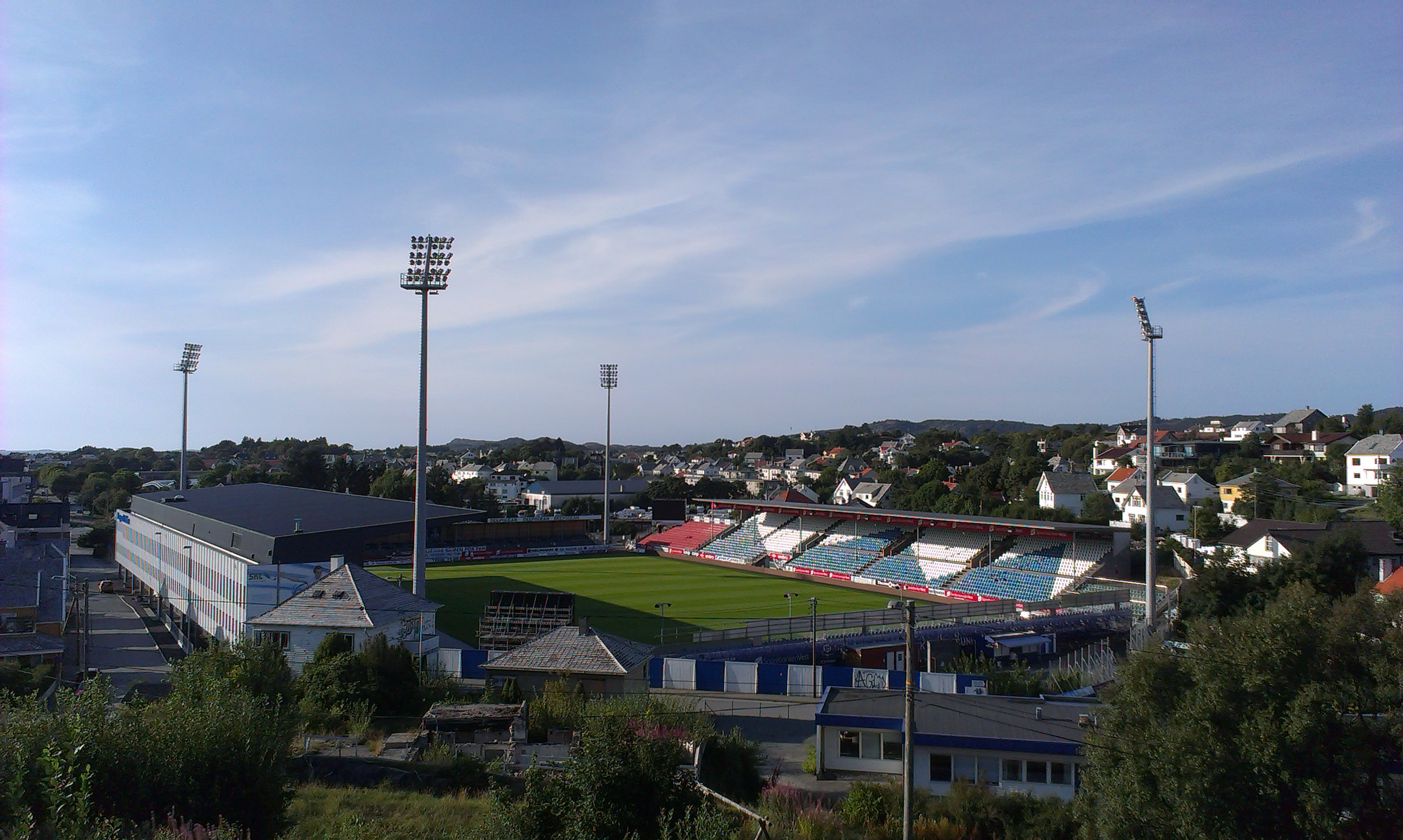

== Bibliography ==
- Fjon, Eilif; Bauge, John Arne (1999). Kim é' det besta laget? (in Norwegian). Haugesund: SK Djerv 1919. ISBN 82-995073-0-8.
- Fagerli, Arnfinn; Nilsen, Christian Lunde (1999). Norsk fotball-leksikon (in Norwegian). Orion. ISBN 82-458-0398-7.
