= Geir Ludvig Fevang =

Norwegian footballer (born 1980)

Personal information
- Date of birth: 17 November 1980 (age 45)
- Place of birth: Norway
- Height: 1.80 m (5 ft 11 in)
- Position: Midfielder

Youth career
- Fevang
- Runar

Senior career*
Years	Team	Apps	(Gls)
1999–2005	Sandefjord	161	(36)
2006–2010	Start	88	(20)
2010–2012	Lokeren	26	(0)
2012–2014	Haugesund	59	(11)
2015–2016	Sandefjord	46	(3)

Managerial career
- 2017–2020: Sandefjord (assistant)
- 2018: Sandefjord (interim)
- * Club domestic league appearances and goals as of 4 November 2016

Geir Ludvig Fevang (born 17 November 1980) is a retired Norwegian football midfielder who last played for Sandefjord. He previously played for Fevang FK, IL Runar, Sandefjord Fotball, IK Start, Lokeren and Haugesund.

== Career ==
Fevang came to IK Start in 2006, and had previously played for the clubs Sandefjord Fotball, Fevang FK and IL Runar. In August 2010, he signed for the Belgian club Lokeren. In March 2012 he moved back to Norway, and signed for FK Haugesund.

After three seasons, he moved back to his first senior club, Sandefjord, who had been promoted to the 2015 Tippeligaen. After the 2016 season he retired to become Sandefjord's assistant manager.

== Career statistics ==
Season	Club	Division	League		Cup		Total	
Season	Club	Division	Apps	Goals	Apps	Goals	Apps	Goals
2000	Sandefjord	Adeccoligaen	24	4	0	0	24	4
2001	Sandefjord	Adeccoligaen	23	5	0	0	23	5
2002	Sandefjord	Adeccoligaen	26	5	1	0	27	5
2003	Sandefjord	Adeccoligaen	30	7	3	1	33	8
2004	Sandefjord	Adeccoligaen	27	8	4	0	31	8
2005	Sandefjord	Adeccoligaen	28	7	0	0	28	7
2006	Start	Tippeligaen	11	1	3	3	14	4
2007	Start	Tippeligaen	7	1	1	0	8	1
2008	Start	Adeccoligaen	26	11	1	1	27	12
2009	Start	Tippeligaen	29	7	2	1	31	8
2010	Start	Tippeligaen	15	1	3	0	18	1
2010–11	Lokeren	Jupiler Pro League	9	0	0	0	9	0
2011–12	Lokeren	Jupiler Pro League	17	0	0	0	17	0
2012	Haugesund	Tippeligaen	24	7	4	3	28	10
2013	Haugesund	Tippeligaen	8	0	1	0	9	0
2014	Haugesund	Tippeligaen	27	4	1	0	28	4
2015	Sandefjord	Tippeligaen	26	2	2	0	28	2
2016	Sandefjord	OBOS-ligaen	20	1	4	2	24	3
Career Total			377	71	30	11	407	82

== Honours ==
Lokeren

- Belgian Cup: 2011–12
