= Amer Osmanagić =

Bosnian footballer (born 1989)

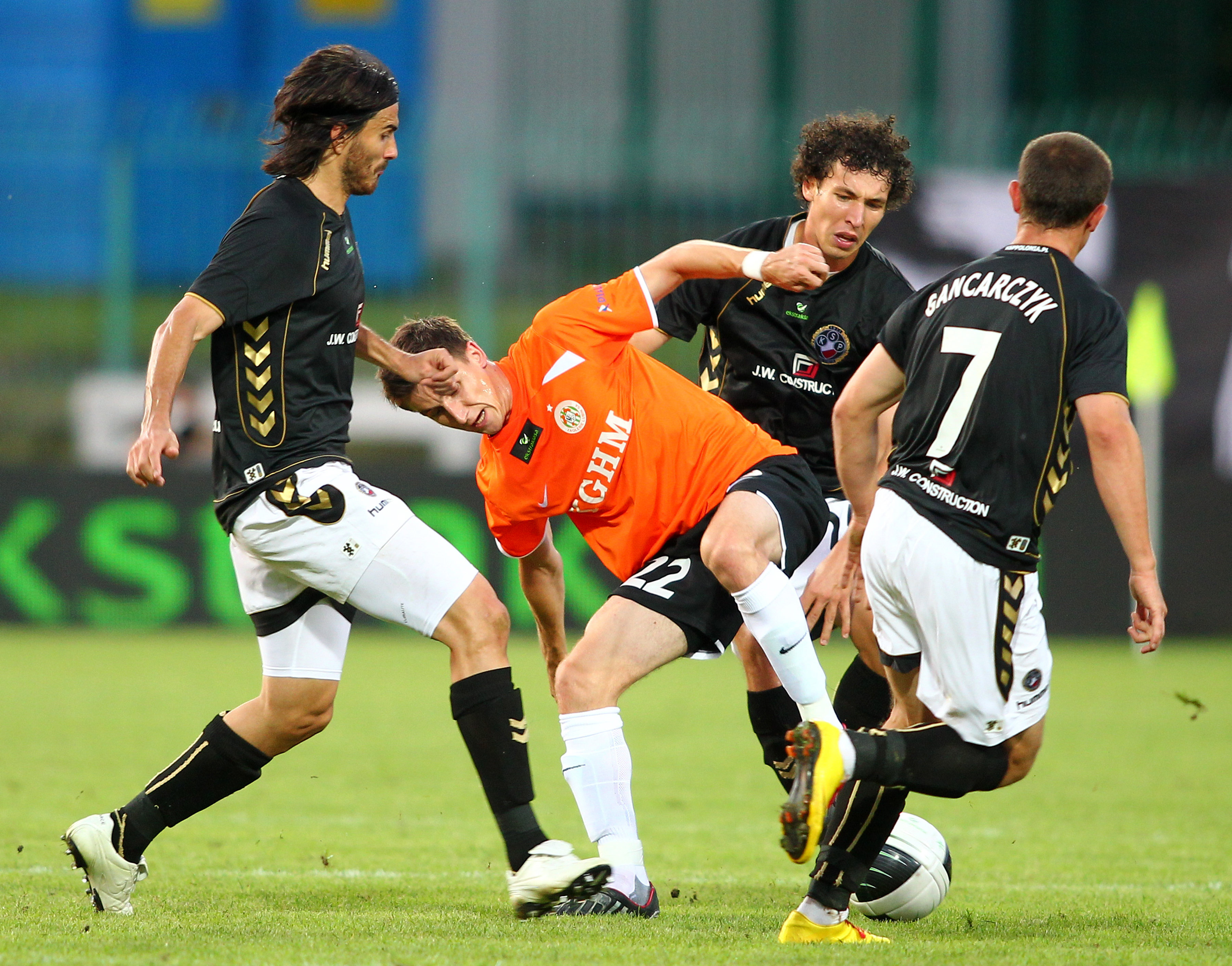
- Amer Osmanagić (middle) playing for Zagłębie Lubin in 2010

Personal information
- Full name: Amer Osmanagić
- Date of birth: 7 May 1989 (age 37)
- Place of birth: Janja, SFR Yugoslavia
- Height: 1.86 m (6 ft 1 in)
- Position: Midfielder

Team information
- Current team: Kačer Belanovica

Youth career
- 1997–2001: Sloboda Tuzla
- 2001–2007: Partizan

Senior career*
Years	Team	Apps	(Gls)
2007–2008	Teleoptik	40	(5)
2008–2012	OFK Belgrade	26	(3)
2009–2010	→ Velež Mostar (loan)	27	(1)
2010–2011	→ Zagłębie Lubin (loan)	17	(0)
2012	Haugesund	2	(1)
2013–2014	Sarajevo	27	(1)
2014–2015	Čelik Zenica	12	(0)
2015	Olimpik Sarajevo	13	(0)
2015–2016	Novi Pazar	18	(1)
2016–2017	Zemun	20	(2)
2017–2018	Sloboda Tuzla	21	(1)
2018–2019	Zvijezda 09	22	(1)
2019–2020	Kalamata	19	(5)
2020–2021	Triglia	7	(0)
2021–2022	Vršac		
2022–	Kačer Belanovica		

International career
2004–2007	Bosnia and Herzegovina U17	2	(0)
2007–2008	Bosnia and Herzegovina U19	3	(0)
2008–2009	Bosnia and Herzegovina U21	3	(0)
- * Club domestic league appearances and goals as of 7 May 2024

Amer Osmanagić (born 7 May 1989) is a Bosnian footballer who plays as a midfielder for Kačer Belanovica.

== Club career ==
Born in Janja, SR Bosnia and Herzegovina, then still part of SFR Yugoslavia, he started playing in the youth teams of FK Sloboda Tuzla, later moving to Belgrade's FK Partizan. In the season 2007-08 he played his first senior season for Partizan's satellite club FK Teleoptik. In January 2009, he signed his first professional senior contract with Serbian SuperLiga club OFK Belgrade. In the summer of 2009, he was loaned to FK Velež Mostar. In 2009, he was voted the best player in the Bosnian Premier League by journalists.

On 18 June 2010, he was loaned to Zagłębie Lubin on a one-year deal. and after one season in the Polish Ekstraklasa, he returned to OFK Beograd where he would play for the 2011–12 Serbian SuperLiga season.

In summer 2012 Osmanagić moved to Norway and signed a three-year contract with FK Haugesund. He made his debut in Tippeligaen and scored his first goal in the match against Vålerenga on 3 August 2012. Osmanagić played in the league-match against Brann and the cup-match Hødd, but did not play again for Haugesund and on 24 October 2012 the club terminated his contract. On 26 July 2014 Osmanagić signed for Čelik Zenica to then move to Olimpic Sarajevo on 1 January 2015, where he played until the end of the season.

== International career ==
Since 2008 he has been member of the Bosnia and Herzegovina national under-21 football team. Earlier, he had represented Bosnia at U-17 and U-19 level.

== Honours ==
Sarajevo

- Bosnian Cup: 2013–14

Olimpik

- Bosnian Cup: 2014–15

Individual

- Bosnian Premier League Player of the Year: 2009
