= David Myrestam =

Swedish footballer

Personal information
- Date of birth: 4 April 1987 (age 39)
- Place of birth: Sweden
- Height: 1.81 m (5 ft 11 in)
- Position: Defender

Youth career
- Ersboda SK

Senior career*
Years	Team	Apps	(Gls)
2006	Mariehem SK	23	(13)
2007–2009	Umeå FC	25	(1)
2009–2012	GIF Sundsvall	93	(1)
2012–2016	FK Haugesund	113	(4)
2017–2021	GIF Sundsvall	101	(2)
- * Club domestic league appearances and goals

David Myrestam (born 4 April 1987) is a Swedish former footballer who played as a defender.
