= Eirik Mæland =

Norwegian footballer (born 1989)

Personal information
- Full name: Eirik Vespestad Mæland
- Date of birth: 15 February 1989 (age 37)
- Place of birth: Stord Municipality, Norway
- Height: 1.76 m (5 ft 9 1/2 in)
- Position: Midfielder

Team information
- Current team: Lillestrøm (assistant manager)

Youth career
- –2006: Bremnes

Senior career*
Years	Team	Apps	(Gls)
2007–2017	Haugesund	143	(12)
2018–2019	Fredrikstad	31	(0)
2020	Kongsvinger	2	(0)

Managerial career
- 2020: Kongsvinger (assistant)
- 2021–2022: Kongsvinger
- 2023–2024: Molde (assistant)
- 2024: Molde (interim)
- 2025–: Lillestrøm (assistant)
- * Club domestic league appearances and goals

Eirik Vespestad Mæland (born 15 February 1989) is a Norwegian football coach and former footballer who currently is assistant coach of 1. divisjon club Lillestrøm.

== Club career ==
He started his senior career in the Norwegian team Haugesund in 2007. He made his debut on 20 June 2007 in a 4–2 loss against Bryne.

== Managerial career ==
On 13 January 2021, Mæland was appointed head coach of Kongsvinger. On 13 December 2022, Molde announced that Mæland would become first team assistant coach at the club.

== Career statistics ==
Club	Season	League			Cup		Total	
Club	Season	Division	Apps	Goals	Apps	Goals	Apps	Goals
Haugesund	2007	1. divisjon	3	0	1	0	4	0
Haugesund	2008	1. divisjon	16	1	0	0	16	1
Haugesund	2009	1. divisjon	19	3	0	0	19	3
Haugesund	2010	Eliteserien	21	4	2	0	23	4
Haugesund	2011	Eliteserien	11	2	0	0	11	2
Haugesund	2012	Eliteserien	15	1	2	0	17	1
Haugesund	2013	Eliteserien	21	0	4	0	25	0
Haugesund	2014	Eliteserien	7	0	1	0	8	0
Haugesund	2015	Eliteserien	8	0	0	0	8	0
Haugesund	2016	Eliteserien	18	1	1	2	19	3
Haugesund	2017	Eliteserien	4	0	0	0	4	0
Haugesund	Total		143	12	11	2	154	14
Fredrikstad	2018	2. divisjon	25	0	2	0	27	0
Fredrikstad	2019	2. divisjon	6	0	2	0	8	0
Fredrikstad	Total		31	0	4	0	35	0
Kongsvinger	2020	1. divisjon	2	0	0	0	2	0
Career Total			176	12	15	2	191	14
