= Lars Øvernes =

Norwegian footballer (born 1989)

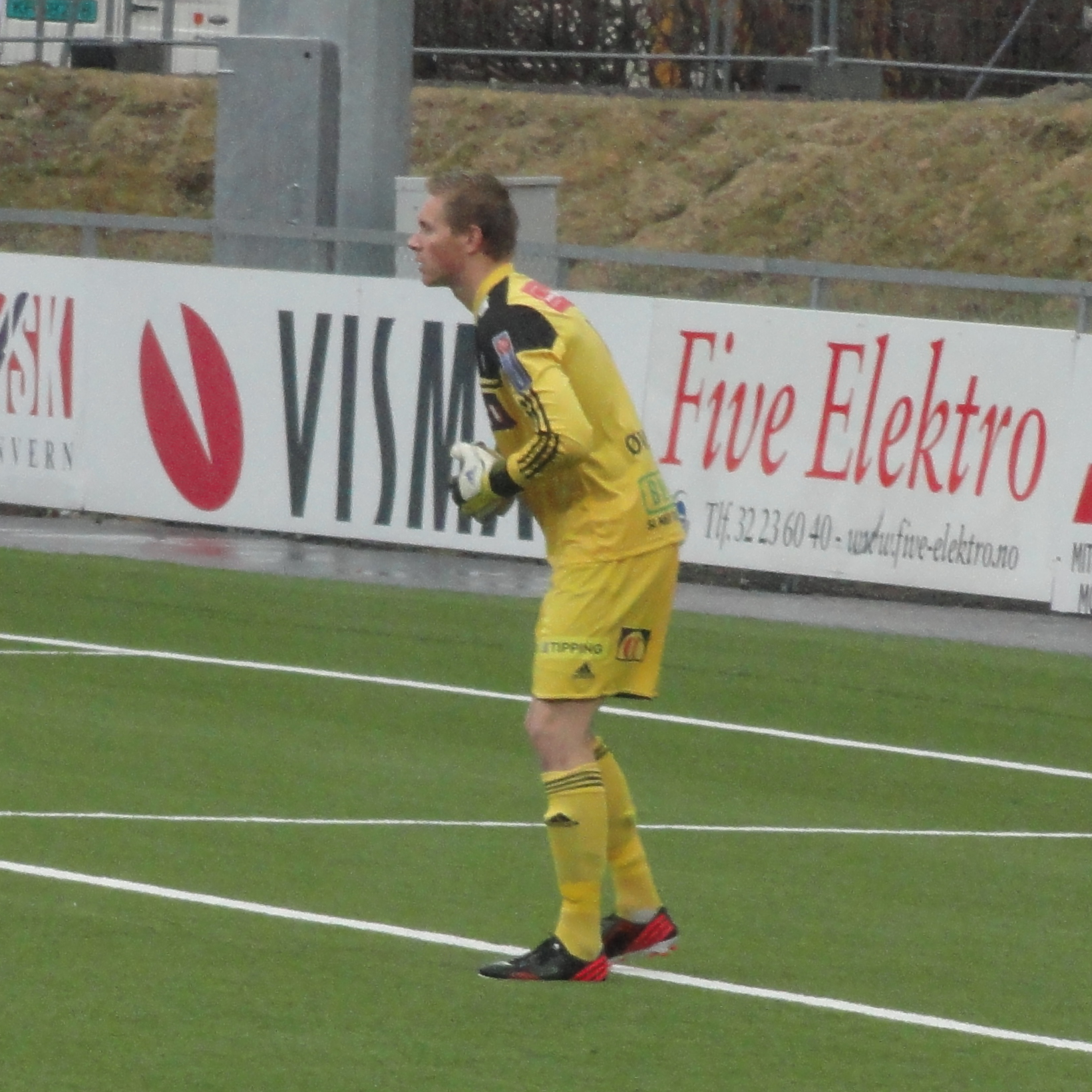

Personal information
- Date of birth: 28 February 1989 (age 37)
- Place of birth: Haugesund, Norway
- Height: 1.87 m (6 ft 2 in)
- Position: Goalkeeper

Team information
- Current team: Etne
- Number: 1

Youth career
- Etne
- Haugesund

Senior career*
Years	Team	Apps	(Gls)
2007–2012	Haugesund	10	(0)
2013–2014	HamKam	50	(0)
2015–2016	Sola	51	(0)
2017–	Etne		

International career
2007	Norway U18	2	(0)
- * Club domestic league appearances and goals

Lars Øvernes (born 28 February 1989) is a retired Norwegian footballer who played as a goalkeeper. He has previously played for Haugesund in Eliteserien.

Hailing from Etne Municipality, Øvernes made his debut in Eliteserien against Vålerenga on 8 August 2010. After six seasons as the second-choice goalkeeper in Haugesund, where he played four matches in Eliteserien and ten league matches in total, Øvernes left Haugesund when his contract expired after the 2012 season and signed for HamKam.

He is a brother-in-law of Sindre Tjelmeland.

== Career statistics ==
Season	Club	Division	League		Cup		Total	
Season	Club	Division	Apps	Goals	Apps	Goals	Apps	Goals
2007	Haugesund	1. divisjon	0	0	0	0	0	0
2008	Haugesund	1. divisjon	5	0	1	0	6	0
2009	Haugesund	1. divisjon	1	0	0	0	1	0
2010	Haugesund	Eliteserien	1	0	2	0	3	0
2011	Haugesund	Eliteserien	3	0	1	0	4	0
2012	Haugesund	Eliteserien	0	0	2	0	2	0
2013	HamKam	1. divisjon	29	0	2	0	31	0
2014	HamKam	1. divisjon	21	0	2	0	23	0
2015	Sola	2. divisjon	26	0	2	0	28	0
2016	Sola	2. divisjon	25	0	1	0	26	0
Career Total			111	0	13	0	124	0
