= Ronny Espedal =

Norwegian footballer (born 1975)

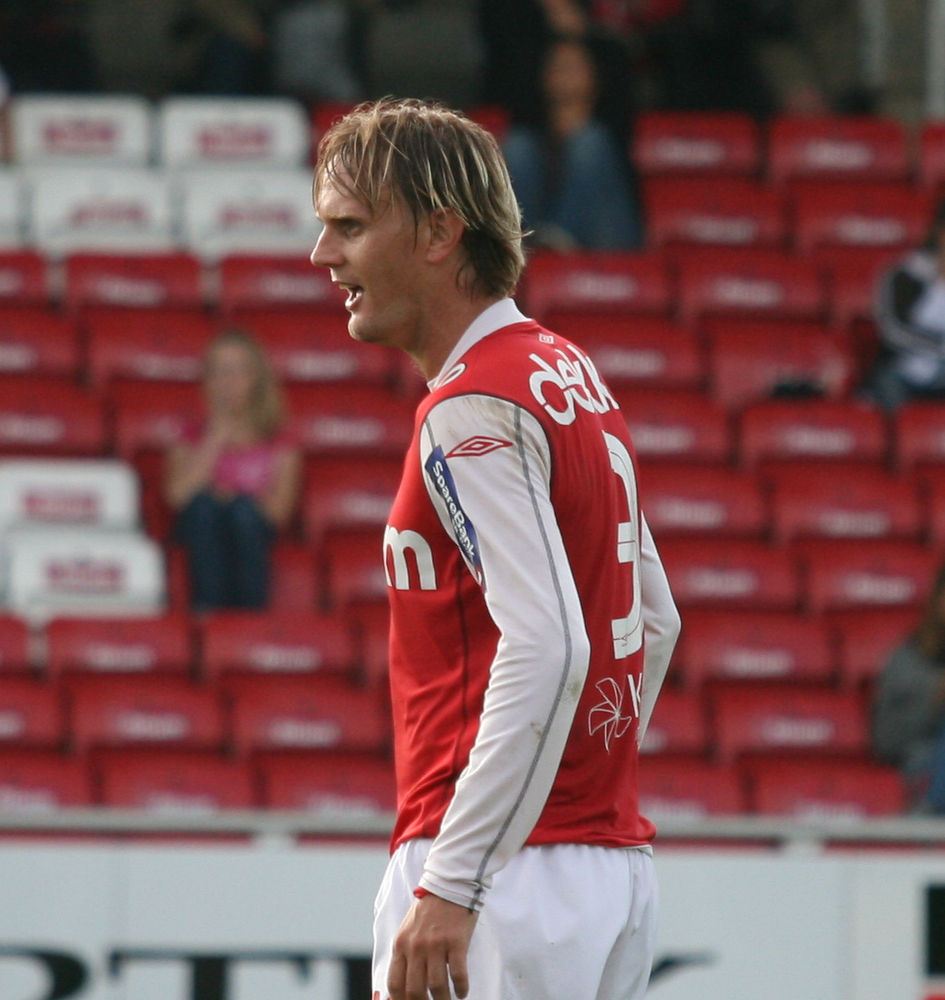
Ronny Espedal at Bryne Stadion in 2008

Ronny Espedal (born 9 May 1975) is a retired Norwegian football defender who last played for Sandnes Ulf.

He spent his early career in Randaberg IL and FK Vidar, and later joined FK Haugesund and Bryne FK in the hope of winning promotion to the Norwegian Premier League. This did not happen, and in 2010 he joined Sandnes Ulf. Sandnes Ulf won a surprise promotion from the 2011 Norwegian First Division, and Espedal made his first-tier debut at the age of almost 37. He retired after the 2012 season, in which Sandnes Ulf retained their spot in the Norwegian Premier League. There had been speculation if Espedal might change his mind about his announced retirement in view of the club's recent success but he insisted that it was time to give opportunities to young players. He resides in Hundvåg, is married and has three children.
