= Trygve Nygaard =

Norwegian footballer (born 1975)

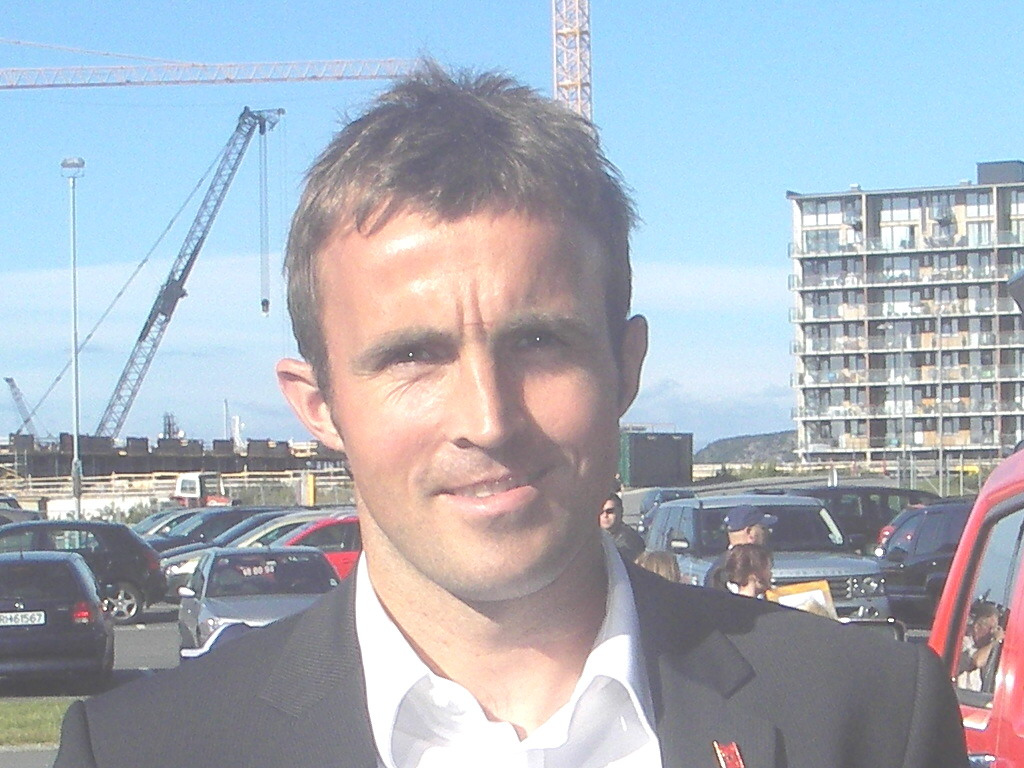

Personal information
- Full name: Trygve Nygaard
- Date of birth: 19 August 1975 (age 51)
- Place of birth: Haugesund, Norway
- Height: 1.80 m (5 ft 11 in)
- Position: Midfielder

Senior career*
Years	Team	Apps	(Gls)
1991–1995	Vard Haugesund		
1996–1998	Haugesund		
1999–2008	Viking	171	(15)
2009–2013	Haugesund	130	(1)
- * Club domestic league appearances and goals as of 22 July 2015

Trygve Nygaard (born 19 August 1975) is a retired Norwegian footballer.
