= Oddbjørn Skartun =

Norwegian footballer (born 1989)

Personal information
- Full name: Oddbjørn Skartun
- Date of birth: 28 January 1989 (age 37)
- Place of birth: Sogndal, Norway
- Height: 1.84 m (6 ft 0 in)
- Position: Forward

Team information
- Current team: Vard Haugesund
- Number: 9

Youth career
- Sogndal

Senior career*
Years	Team	Apps	(Gls)
2006–2009	Sogndal	5	(0)
2009–2011	Vard Haugesund	78	(26)
2012	Haugesund	9	(0)
2013–2016	Bryne	104	(43)
2017	Sandnes Ulf	29	(4)
2018–	Vard Haugesund	2	(0)
- * Club domestic league appearances and goals as of 22 April 2018

Oddbjørn Skartun (born 28 January 1989) is a Norwegian footballer who plays as a forward. He has previously played for Sogndal, Vard Haugesund, Haugesund and Sandnes Ulf.

== Career ==
Skartun was born and raised in Sogndal Municipality, and played a total of six matches (five league matches) for the Norwegian First Division side Sogndal IL between 2006 and 2009. In 2009, Skartun moved to Vard Haugesund, and scored 26 goals in three seasons for the team in the Second Division. Ahead of the 2012 season, Skartun signed a contract with Haugesund, where he made nine appearances in Tippeligaen, eight as a substitute. He scored two goals for the first-team in the Norwegian Cup and scored 30 goals for the reserve team in the Third Division. Skartun joined Bryne ahead of the 2013 season, and signed a two-year contract with the club. After scoring six goals in the first ten matches for Bryne in the First Division, Skartun scored two goals when Viking was eliminated in the third round of the 2013 Norwegian Football Cup.

Ahead of the 2018 season, he left Sandnes Ulf and trained for several months with Vard Haugesund, but was reluctant to sign for a third-tier club. He nonetheless did.

== Personal life ==
Skartun is the son of the former Sogndal player Jarle Skartun. His uncles, Gjermund Skartun and Rolf Navarsete did also play for Sogndal.

== Career statistics ==
As of 6 November 2017

Season	Club	Division	League		Cup		Total	
Season	Club	Division	Apps	Goals	Apps	Goals	Apps	Goals
2012	Haugesund	Tippeligaen	9	0	4	2	13	2
2013	Bryne	Adeccoligaen	30	16	2	2	32	18
2014	Bryne	1. Divisjon	27	7	1	0	28	7
2015	Bryne	OBOS-ligaen	29	12	2	0	31	12
2016	Bryne	OBOS-ligaen	18	8	1	0	19	8
2017	Sandnes Ulf	OBOS-ligaen	29	4	2	0	31	4
Career Total			142	47	12	4	154	51
