= Maic Sema =

Swedish footballer (born 1988)

Personal information
- Full name: Maic Ndongala Namputu Sema
- Date of birth: 2 December 1988 (age 37)
- Place of birth: Åsele, Sweden
- Height: 1.72 m (5 ft 8 in)
- Position: Forward

Youth career
- IF Sylvia

Senior career*
Years	Team	Apps	(Gls)
2007–2008	Sylvia	38	(6)
2008–2011	Hammarby	71	(13)
2012–2014	Haugesund	51	(13)
2013	→ MVV Maastricht (loan)	15	(5)
2015	AEL Limassol	21	(2)
2016–2017	Örebro SK	55	(12)
2018	NorthEast United FC	7	(0)
2018–2019	GIF Sundsvall	40	(9)
2019–2023	IFK Norrköping	77	(5)
- * Club domestic league appearances and goals as of 15 November 2023

Maic Ndongala Namputu Sema (born 2 December 1988) is a Swedish professional footballer who plays as a forward.

== Career ==
Sema was born in Åsele. Until 2011, he played for Hammarby IF, where he came from IF Sylvia summer 2008. In the 2011 season, he made 10 goals for Hammarby and was elected by the fans as Player of the Year. In January 2012 Sema went to Norwegian FK Haugesund. He was loaned out to MVV Maastricht in the Dutch Eerste Divisie in 2013.

He left Haugesund after the 2014 season. He later had a short spell at Cypriot First Division side, AEL Limassol, before becoming a free agent at the end of the 2014–15 season. He was most recently trialing with Blackburn Rovers, appearing in a friendly match against Tranmere Rovers, in which his team won 2–0.

In March 2018, Sema joined GIF Sundsvall in Allsvenskan. In August 2019, Maic Sema joined the main club of his home town, IFK Norrköping.

== Personal life ==
Sema was born in Sweden to Congolese parents, his brother Ken Sema is also a footballer.

== Career statistics ==
As of 30 December 2015

Appearances and goals by club, season and competition
Club	Season	League			Cup		Total	
Club	Season	Division	Apps	Goals	Apps	Goals	Apps	Goals
Hammarby	2008	Allsvenskan	3	0	0	0	3	0
Hammarby	2009	Allsvenskan	12	0	0	0	12	0
Hammarby	2010	Superettan	26	3	0	0	26	3
Hammarby	2011	Superettan	30	10	0	0	30	10
Hammarby	Total		71	13	0	0	71	13
Haugesund	2012	Tippeligaen	23	2	5	3	28	5
Haugesund	2013	Tippeligaen	2	1	2	1	4	2
Haugesund	2014	Tippeligaen	26	10	5	0	31	10
Haugesund	Total		51	13	12	4	63	17
MVV Maastricht (loan)	2013–14	Eerste Divisie	15	5	2	1	17	6
AEL Limassol	2014–15	Cypriot First Division	21	2	4	3	25	5
Career total			158	33	18	8	176	41
