= Joakim Våge Nilsen =

Norwegian footballer (born 1991)

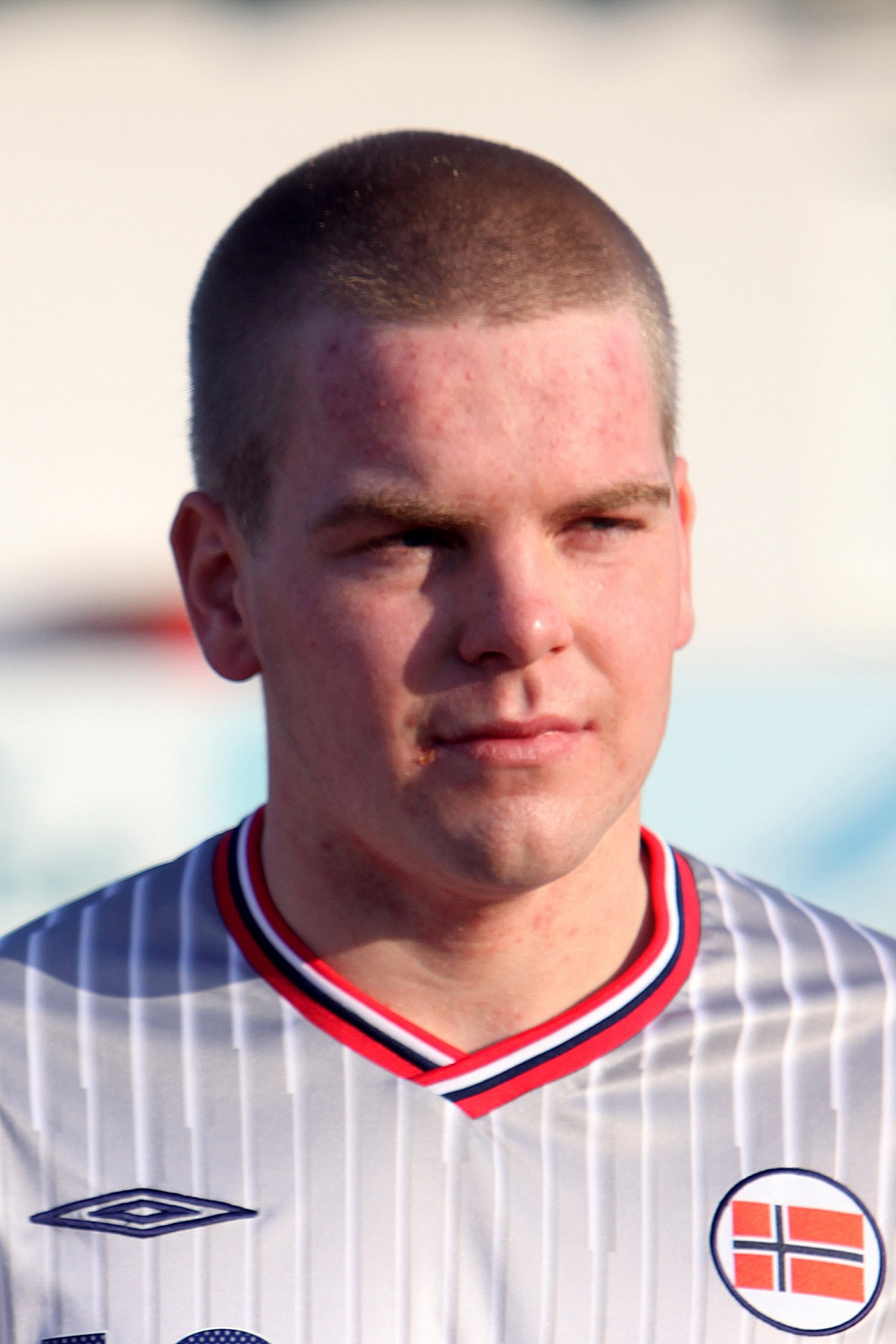

Personal information
- Full name: Joakim Våge Nilsen
- Date of birth: 24 April 1991 (age 35)
- Place of birth: Bømlo Municipality, Norway
- Height: 1.78 m (5 ft 10 in)
- Position: Left back

Youth career
- Foldrøy
- Bremnes

Senior career*
Years	Team	Apps	(Gls)
2007–2015	Haugesund	154	(5)
2016–2017	Odd	35	(1)
2018–2021	Haugesund	52	(1)
- * Club domestic league appearances and goals as of 8 August 2020

Joakim Våge Nilsen (born 24 April 1991) is a retired Norwegian football defender.

== Haugesund ==
He made his debut for Haugesund on 5 April 2009 against Tromsdalen at the age of 17 years. He played in all but one Adeccoligaen game that season, only missing the game against Skeid through suspension after being sent off against Nybergsund five days before his eighteenth birthday. The young left back was an integral part to Haugesund winning the Norwegian First Division that year.

After helping Haugesund to promotion to Tippeligaen 2010 – the first time in ten years – Våge Nilsen continued as a mainstay in the first team, missing just two games and amounting a total of 2520 Tippeligaen minutes, 93% of what he could have played. He scored his first professional goal on 21 March 2010 against Strømsgodset, the equaliser in a 2–2 draw. In September, the youngster won the Statoils talent award, an award handed to the best young player in Norwegian football every month.

Våge Nilsen signed for Odd for the 2016 season after seven seasons with Haugesund. He returned to Haugesund for the start of the 2018 season.

== Career statistics ==
Club	Season	Division	League		Cup		Total	
Club	Season	Division	Apps	Goals	Apps	Goals	Apps	Goals
Haugesund	2007	1. divisjon	1	0	0	0	1	0
Haugesund	2008	1. divisjon	7	0	1	1	8	1
Haugesund	2009	1. divisjon	29	0	1	0	30	0
Haugesund	2010	Tippeligaen	28	2	3	0	31	2
Haugesund	2011	Tippeligaen	16	0	0	0	16	0
Haugesund	2012	Tippeligaen	20	0	3	1	23	1
Haugesund	2013	Tippeligaen	13	2	0	0	13	2
Haugesund	2014	Tippeligaen	30	0	4	1	34	1
Haugesund	2015	Tippeligaen	10	1	2	0	12	1
Haugesund	Total		154	5	14	3	168	8
Odd	2016	Tippeligaen	22	1	4	1	26	2
Odd	2017	Eliteserien	25	0	3	0	28	0
Odd	Total		47	1	7	1	54	2
Haugesund	2018	Eliteserien	30	1	2	0	32	1
Haugesund	2019	Eliteserien	13	0	1	0	14	0
Haugesund	2020	Eliteserien	9	0	0	0	9	0
Haugesund	Total		52	1	3	0	55	1
Career Total			253	7	24	4	277	11
