= Michael Haukås =

Norwegian footballer (born 1986)

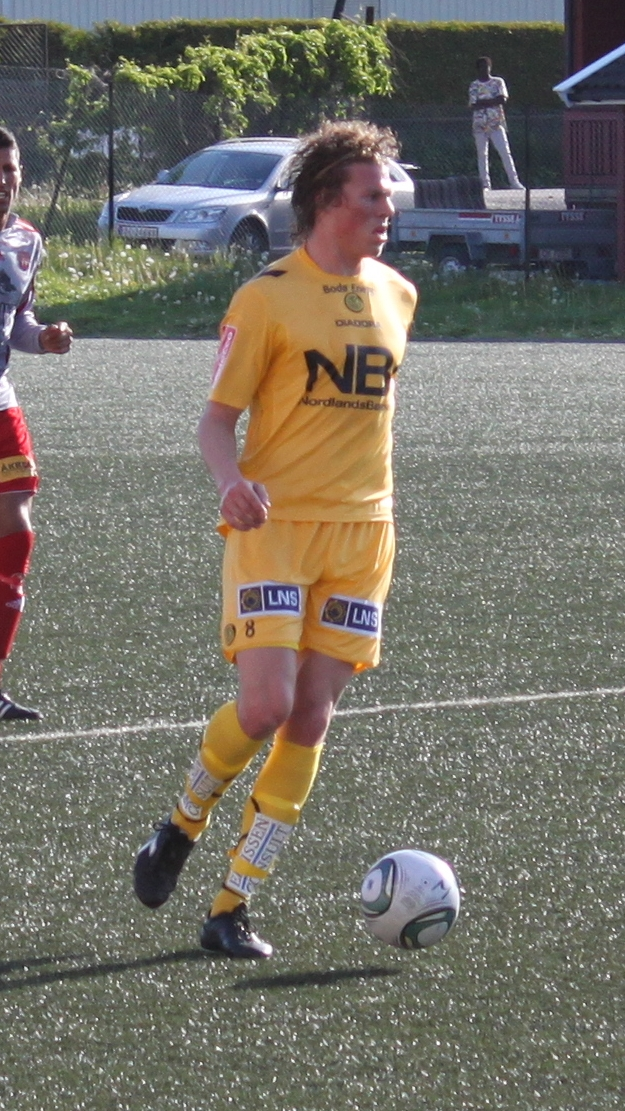

Personal information
- Full name: Michael Enge Haukås
- Date of birth: 21 November 1986 (age 39)
- Place of birth: Haugesund, Norway
- Height: 1.90 m (6 ft 3 in)
- Position: Midfielder

Youth career
- −2004: Djerv 1919

Senior career*
Years	Team	Apps	(Gls)
2005–2008	Vard Haugesund		
2009	Stavanger	21	(6)
2010–2011	Bodø/Glimt	52	(8)
2012–2015	Haugesund	76	(8)
2016–2017	Viking	39	(1)
- * Club domestic league appearances and goals as of 6 January 2018

Michael Enge Haukås (born 21 November 1986) is a retired Norwegian football player.

== Club career ==
He started his senior career in the Norwegian team Vard Haugesund in 2005, and in 2009 he played for Stavanger.

In 2010, he signed for Norwegian team Bodø/Glimt. He made his debut on 11 April 2010 against Mjøndalen.

After two good seasons with Bodø/Glimt he signed for Haugesund in 2012. He made his debut on 25 March 2012 against Vålerenga;and won the bronze medal with FK Haugesund in 2013.

After his contract with Haugesund ended in December 2015, he signed a two-year contract at Viking FK in 2016.

Haukås retired from professional football in 2017.

== Career statistics ==
As of 6 January 2018

Season	Club	Division	League		Cup		Total	
Season	Club	Division	Apps	Goals	Apps	Goals	Apps	Goals
2009	Stavanger	1. divisjon	21	6	0	0	21	6
2010	Bodø/Glimt	1. divisjon	24	5	3	1	27	6
2011	Bodø/Glimt	1. divisjon	28	3	3	0	31	3
2012	Haugesund	Eliteserien	22	3	3	1	25	4
2013	Haugesund	Eliteserien	29	3	4	1	33	4
2014	Haugesund	Eliteserien	0	0	0	0	0	0
2015	Haugesund	Eliteserien	25	2	2	0	27	2
2016	Viking	Eliteserien	24	1	3	0	27	1
2017	Viking	Eliteserien	15	0	2	0	17	0
Career Total			188	23	20	3	208	26
