= Tor Arne Andreassen =

Norwegian footballer (born 1983)

Personal information
- Full name: Tor Arne Andreassen
- Date of birth: 16 March 1983 (age 43)
- Place of birth: Haugesund, Norway
- Height: 1.84 m (6 ft 0 in)
- Position: Defensive midfielder

Youth career
- –2002: Vard Haugesund

Senior career*
Years	Team	Apps	(Gls)
2003–2017	Haugesund	300	(35)
- * Club domestic league appearances and goals as of 26 November 2017

Tor Arne Andreassen (born 16 March 1983) is a Norwegian former footballer who played in defence and midfield for Haugesund.

== Career statistics ==
Season	Club	Division	League		Cup		Total	
Season	Club	Division	Apps	Goals	Apps	Goals	Apps	Goals
2003	Haugesund	Adeccoligaen	26	3	5	0	31	3
2004	Haugesund	Adeccoligaen	26	1	0	0	26	1
2005	Haugesund	Adeccoligaen	0	0	0	0	0	0
2006	Haugesund	Adeccoligaen	21	1	1	0	22	1
2007	Haugesund	Adeccoligaen	23	3	6	0	29	3
2008	Haugesund	Adeccoligaen	11	1	0	0	11	1
2009	Haugesund	Adeccoligaen	26	4	1	0	27	4
2010	Haugesund	Tippeligaen	27	6	3	0	30	6
2011	Haugesund	Tippeligaen	22	4	3	0	25	4
2012	Haugesund	Tippeligaen	14	2	1	0	15	2
2013	Haugesund	Tippeligaen	26	3	3	2	29	5
2014	Haugesund	Tippeligaen	28	1	5	0	33	1
2015	Haugesund	Tippeligaen	16	2	1	0	17	2
2016	Haugesund	Tippeligaen	11	1	2	1	13	2
2017	Haugesund	Eliteserien	23	3	3	1	26	4
Career Total			300	35	34	4	334	39
