= Per Morten Kristiansen =

Norwegian footballer (born 1981)

Personal information
- Full name: Per Morten Kristiansen
- Date of birth: 14 July 1981 (age 45)
- Place of birth: Sarpsborg, Norway
- Height: 1.85 m (6 ft 1 in)
- Position: Goalkeeper

Team information
- Current team: Fredrikstad
- Number: 30

Youth career
- Greåker IF
- Fredrikstad FK

Senior career*
Years	Team	Apps	(Gls)
2000–2005	Moss	127	(0)
2006–2015	Haugesund	240	(1)
2016–	Fredrikstad	21	(0)
- * Club domestic league appearances and goals as of 2 November 2016

Per Morten Kristiansen (born 14 July 1981) is a Norwegian football goalkeeper who last played for FK Haugesund.

His former clubs are Greåker IF, Fredrikstad and Moss.

== Career statistics ==
Season	Club	Division	League		Cup		Total	
Season	Club	Division	Apps	Goals	Apps	Goals	Apps	Goals
2000	Moss	Tippeligaen	5	0	0	0	5	0
2001	Moss	Tippeligaen	25	0	1	0	26	0
2002	Moss	Tippeligaen	24	0	4	0	28	0
2003	Moss	Adeccoligaen	13	0	0	0	13	0
2004	Moss	Adeccoligaen	30	0	1	0	31	0
2005	Moss	Adeccoligaen	30	0	0	0	30	0
2006	Haugesund	Adeccoligaen	30	0	1	0	31	0
2007	Haugesund	Adeccoligaen	30	0	7	0	37	0
2008	Haugesund	Adeccoligaen	13	1	0	0	13	1
2009	Haugesund	Adeccoligaen	29	0	1	0	30	0
2010	Haugesund	Tippeligaen	29	0	2	0	31	0
2011	Haugesund	Tippeligaen	27	0	3	0	30	0
2012	Haugesund	Tippeligaen	30	0	3	0	33	0
2013	Haugesund	Tippeligaen	30	0	2	0	32	0
2014	Haugesund	Tippeligaen	19	0	0	0	19	0
2015	Haugesund	Tippeligaen	3	0	0	0	3	0
2016	Fredrikstad	OBOS-ligaen	21	0	1	0	22	0
Career Total			388	1	26	0	414	1
