= Ugonna Anyora =

Nigerian football midfielder

Personal information
- Date of birth: 29 April 1991 (age 35)
- Place of birth: Enugu, Nigeria
- Height: 1.83 m (6 ft 0 in)
- Position: Midfielder

Team information
- Current team: Enugu Rangers

Youth career
- Enugu Rangers

Senior career*
Years	Team	Apps	(Gls)
2010–2014	Haugesund	86	(0)
2015	Hønefoss	22	(3)
2016	Assyriska	16	(0)
2018–	Enugu Rangers	6	(0)
- * Club domestic league appearances and goals as of 19 March 2018

Ugonna Anyora // (born 29 April 1991) is a Nigerian football midfielder who plays as a midfielder for Enugu Rangers.

== Career ==
Anyora made his debut in Tippeligaen in the 2–0 victory against Vålerenga on 8 August 2010.

Anyora left Haugesund after the 2014 season when his contract expired. After a trial, Anyora signed a two-year contract with Hønefoss BK on 18 February 2015. After just one season, which saw Hønefoss relegated to 2. divisjon, Anyora left the club.

Anyora joined his former club, Enugu Rangers, in January 2018.

== Career statistics ==
As of 11 November 2015

Season	Club	Division	League		Cup		Total	
Season	Club	Division	Apps	Goals	Apps	Goals	Apps	Goals
2010	Haugesund	Tippeligaen	2	0	0	0	2	0
2011	Haugesund	Tippeligaen	25	0	3	1	28	1
2012	Haugesund	Tippeligaen	22	0	3	2	25	2
2013	Haugesund	Tippeligaen	20	0	5	2	25	2
2014	Haugesund	Tippeligaen	17	0	4	0	21	0
2015	Hønefoss	OBOS-ligaen	22	3	0	0	22	3
Career total			108	3	15	5	123	8
