= 2011 FK Haugesund season =

Haugesund
2011 season
- Chairman: Leif Helge Kaldheim
- Manager: Jostein Grindhaug
- Stadium: Haugesund Stadion
- Tippeligaen: 6th
- Norwegian Cup: Fourth Round vs Viking
- Top goalscorer: League: Nikola Đurđić (12); All: Alexander Søderlund (15)
| Home colours | Away colours |

The 2011 season was Haugesund's 2nd season in the Tippeligaen following their promotion in 2009, their 3rd season with Jostein Grindhaug as manager and 9th season in existence. They finished the season in 6th position, whilst also reaching the Fourth round of the Norwegian Cup.

== Squad ==
Note: Flags indicate national team as defined under FIFA eligibility rules; some limited exceptions apply. Players may hold more than one non-FIFA nationality.

| No. | Pos. | Nation | Player |
|---|---|---|---|
| 1 | GK | NOR | Per Morten Kristiansen (Captain) |
| 2 | DF | NOR | Joakim Våge Nilsen |
| 3 | DF | FRA | Derek Decamps |
| 4 | DF | CAN | Chris Pozniak |
| 5 | MF | NOR | Trygve Nygaard |
| 7 | DF | ISL | Andrés Már Jóhannesson |
| 9 | FW | NOR | Alexander Søderlund |
| 10 | MF | SLE | Umaru Bangura |
| 11 | DF | NOR | Tor Arne Andreassen |
| 12 | GK | NOR | Lars Øvernes |
| 13 | MF | NOR | Eirik Mæland |
| 14 | MF | NOR | Jarle Steinsland |

| No. | Pos. | Nation | Player |
|---|---|---|---|
| 15 | DF | NOR | Ole Kristian Kråkmo |
| 16 | MF | NGA | Ugonna Anyora |
| 18 | DF | NOR | Vegard Skjerve |
| 19 | MF | NOR | Kristoffer Haraldseid |
| 20 | MF | FIN | Juska Savolainen |
| 21 | MF | NOR | Eirik Ulland Andersen |
| 23 | MF | BRA | Daniel Bamberg |
| 25 | DF | NOR | Are Tronseth (Vice-Captain) |
| 26 | MF | NOR | Fredrik Deilkås |
| 28 | FW | NOR | Lars Hansen |
| 44 | FW | SRB | Nikola Đurđić |

== Transfers ==
=== Winter ===
In: Note: Flags indicate national team as defined under FIFA eligibility rules; some limited exceptions apply. Players may hold more than one non-FIFA nationality.

| No. | Pos. | Nation | Player |
|---|---|---|---|
| 9 | FW | NOR | Alexander Søderlund (from (Norway) Vard Haugesund) |
| 10 | MF | SLE | Umaru Bangura (from (Norway) Hønefoss) |
| 23 | MF | BRA | Daniel Bamberg (from (Sweden) IFK Norrköping) |
| 28 | FW | NOR | Lars Waage Hansen (from (Norway) Vard Haugesund) |

Out: Note: Flags indicate national team as defined under FIFA eligibility rules; some limited exceptions apply. Players may hold more than one non-FIFA nationality.

| No. | Pos. | Nation | Player |
|---|---|---|---|
| 3 | MF | SVN | Rok Elsner (to (Poland) Śląsk Wrocław) |
| 7 | MF | DEN | Martin Christensen (to (Denmark) SønderjyskE) |
| 9 | FW | SWE | John Pelu (to (Azerbaijan) Mughan) |
| 15 | DF | DEN | Allan Olesen (to (Sweden) IFK Mariehamn) |
| 17 | MF | NOR | Dag Roar Ørsal |
| 24 | GK | NED | Beau Molenaar (to (Norway) Åkra) |

=== Summer ===
In: Note: Flags indicate national team as defined under FIFA eligibility rules; some limited exceptions apply. Players may hold more than one non-FIFA nationality.

| No. | Pos. | Nation | Player |
|---|---|---|---|
| 3 | DF | FRA | Derek Decamps (from (South Africa) Ajax Cape Town) |
| 7 | MF | ISL | Andrés Már Jóhannesson (from (Iceland) Fylkir) |

Out: Note: Flags indicate national team as defined under FIFA eligibility rules; some limited exceptions apply. Players may hold more than one non-FIFA nationality.

| No. | Pos. | Nation | Player |
|---|---|---|---|
| 6 | FW | NOR | Thomas Sørum (to (Sweden) Helsingborg) |
| 8 | MF | DEN | Jacob Sørensen (to (Denmark) Vejle Kolding) |
| 22 | FW | NOR | Sten Ove Eike (to (Norway) Sandefjord) |

== Competitions ==
=== Tippeligaen ===
==== Results summary ====
| Overall | | | | | | | | Home | | | | | | Away | | | | | |
| Pld | W | D | L | GF | GA | GD | Pts | W | D | L | GF | GA | GD | W | D | L | GF | GA | GD |
|---|---|---|---|---|---|---|---|---|---|---|---|---|---|---|---|---|---|---|---|
| 30 | 14 | 5 | 11 | 55 | 43 | +12 | 47 | 10 | 4 | 1 | 39 | 17 | +22 | 4 | 1 | 10 | 16 | 26 | −10 |

==== Results by round ====
| Round | 1 | 2 | 3 | 4 | 5 | 6 | 7 | 8 | 9 | 10 | 11 | 12 | 13 | 14 | 15 | 16 | 17 | 18 | 19 | 20 | 21 | 22 | 23 | 24 | 25 | 26 | 27 | 28 | 29 | 30 |
|---|---|---|---|---|---|---|---|---|---|---|---|---|---|---|---|---|---|---|---|---|---|---|---|---|---|---|---|---|---|---|
| Ground | A | H | A | H | A | H | A | H | A | H | H | A | H | A | H | A | H | A | A | H | A | H | A | H | A | H | A | H | A | H |
| Result | L | W | L | D | L | L | W | D | L | W | W | L | W | L | W | L | W | W | W | D | L | W | L | W | D | W | L | D | W | W |
| Position | 12 | 8 | 11 | 11 | 14 | 15 | 14 | 15 | 10 | 7 | 9 | 6 | 9 | 10 | 8 | 11 | 8 | 6 | 6 | 7 | 8 | 5 | 7 | 7 | 7 | 5 | 8 | 8 | 7 | 6 |

Source: see below
A = Away; H = Home; W = Win; D = Draw; L = Loss

==== Results ====
| 20 March 2011 1 | Tromsø | 2–0 | Haugesund | Tromsø |
| 18:00 CET (UTC+1) | Drage 50'; Mbodji (yellow card) 63'; Rushfeldt 90+4' | Report | Anyora (yellow card) 56' | Stadium: Alfheim Stadion; Attendance: 3,962; Referee: Dag Vidar Hafsås |

| 3 April 2011 2 | Haugesund | 4–2 | Sarpsborg 08 | Haugesund |
| 18:00 CEST (UTC+2) | Sørensen 19'; Sørum 48'; Jonvik 60' (o.g.); Đurđić 67' (pen.) | Report | Giæver (yellow card) 27'; Hansen 78'; J.Jørgensen 81' | Stadium: Haugesund Stadion; Attendance: 4,727; Referee: Ken Henry Johnsen |

| 10 April 2011 3 | Aalesund | 1–0 | Haugesund | Ålesund |
| 18:00 CEST (UTC+2) | Phillips 19'; Larsen (penalty missed) 72' | Report | | Stadium: Color Line Stadion; Attendance: 8,963; Referee: Brage Sandmoen |

| 15 April 2011 4 | Haugesund | 3–3 | Brann | Haugesund |
| 19:00 CEST (UTC+2) | Sørum 8', 9'; Mæland 26'; Bangura (yellow card) 68' | Report | Mjelde 1'; Sævarsson (yellow card) 11'; Ojo 35' (pen.); Kalvenes (yellow card) 37'; Guastavino 39' | Stadium: Haugesund Stadion; Attendance: 5,000; Referee: Svein-Erik Edvartsen |

| 25 April 2011 5 | Lillestrøm | 5–0 | Haugesund | Lillestrøm |
| 16:00 CEST (UTC+2) | Sigurðarson 26'; Gíslason (yellow card) 36'; Ujah 56', 60'; Igiebor 79', 86' (yellow card) 81' | Report | Pozniak (yellow card) 42' | Stadium: Åråsen Stadion; Attendance: 6,612; Referee: Kjetil Sælen |

| 8 May 2011 6 | Haugesund | 3–4 | Stabæk | Haugesund |
| 18:00 CEST (UTC+2) | Søderlund 40', 58' (pen.); Nordberg 82' | Report | Gunnarsson 1', 83'; Ollé Ollé 25', 36' (yellow card) 27' | Stadium: Haugesund Stadion; Attendance: 4,194; Referee: Dag Vidar Hafsås |

| 16 May 2011 7 | Rosenborg | 0–1 | Haugesund | Trondheim |
| 18:00 CEST (UTC+2) | Lago (yellow card) 78' | Report | Sørum 53' | Stadium: Lerkendal Stadion; Attendance: 20,710; Referee: Tom Harald Hagen |

| 19 May 2011 8 | Haugesund | 1–1 | Vålerenga | Haugesund |
| 19:00 CEST (UTC+2) | Nordberg 20'; Nordberg (yellow card) 68'; Søderlund (yellow card) 85' | Report | Strandberg 6'; Haidar (yellow card) 30' | Stadium: Haugesund Stadion; Attendance: 4,844; Referee: Tommy Skjerven |

| 29 May 2011 10 | Haugesund | 5–0 | Molde | Haugesund |
| 18:00 CEST (UTC+2) | Søderlund 7'; Diouf 22' (o.g.); Sørum 39', 51'; Đurđić 59' (pen.) | Report | | Stadium: Haugesund Stadion; Attendance: 4,287; Referee: Kristoffer Helgerud |

| 13 June 2011 11 | Haugesund | 2–0 | Viking | Haugesund |
| 18:00 CEST (UTC+2) | Bamberg 2'; Đurđić (yellow card) 24' (goal) 55' | Report | Nevland (yellow card) 13'; Sæternes (yellow card) 40'; Berisha (yellow card) 52'; Landu Landu (yellow card) 83' | Stadium: Haugesund Stadion; Attendance: 5,000; Referee: Tom Henning Øvrebø |

| 16 June 2011 12 | Sogndal | 3–1 | Haugesund | Sogndalsfjøra |
| 19:00 CEST (UTC+2) | Halvorsen 9', 38'; Solheim 24' | Report | Søderlund 4' | Stadium: Fosshaugane Campus; Attendance: 1,884; Referee: Kristoffer Helgerud |

| 19 June 2011 13 | Haugesund | 1–0 | Start | Haugesund |
| 16:00 CEST (UTC+2) | Bamberg 24'; Bangura (yellow card) 39' (yellow-red card) 64'; Đurđić (yellow card) 75' | Report | Hanssen (yellow card) 80' | Stadium: Haugesund Stadion; Attendance: 4,401; Referee: Kjetil Sælen |

| 26 June 2011 14 | Strømsgodset | 3–1 | Haugesund | Drammen |
| 18:00 CEST (UTC+2) | Vilsvik (penalty missed) 45' 52'; Madsen (yellow card) 86'; Andersen 89'; Kamara 90+2' (pen.) | Report | Sørum 9'; Søderlund (yellow card) 88' | Stadium: Marienlyst Stadion; Attendance: 5,922; Referee: Tom Henning Øvrebø |

| 29 June 2011 9 | Fredrikstad | 1–0 | Haugesund | Fredrikstad |
| 19:00 CEST (UTC+2) | Jabbie (yellow card) 30'; Elyounoussi 83' | Report | | Stadium: Fredrikstad Stadion; Attendance: 8,518; Referee: Trygve Kjensli |
Note: Match originally scheduled for 22 May 2011, but postponed due to player strikes.

| 3 July 2011 15 | Haugesund | 2–1 | Odd | Haugesund |
| 18:00 CEST (UTC+2) | Đurđić 33' (pen.); Bamberg 55'; Andreassen (yellow card) 84' | Report | Fevang (yellow card) 32'; Larsen (yellow card) 32'; Johnsen (penalty missed) 35'; Brenne 37'; Samuelsen (yellow card) 60'; Brenne (yellow card) 76' | Stadium: Haugesund Stadion; Attendance: 9,095; Referee: Espen Berntsen |

| 17 July 2011 16 | Molde | 3–1 | Haugesund | Molde |
| 18:00 CEST (UTC+2) | Chima 12'; Moström 15', 63'; Forren (yellow card) 62'; Holm (yellow card) 80'; Mota (yellow card) 85' | Report | Anyora (yellow card) 35'; Andreassen 78' | Stadium: Aker Stadion; Attendance: 11,032; Referee: Trond Ivar Døvle |

| 31 July 2011 18 | Sarpsborg 08 | 0–3 | Haugesund | Sarpsborg |
| 18:00 CEST (UTC+2) | Wembangomo (yellow card) 86' | Report | Sørum 16'; Andreassen 54'; Skjerve (yellow card) 73'; Bamberg (yellow card) 81'; Đurđić 86' (pen.) | Stadium: Sarpsborg Stadion; Attendance: 2,814; Referee: Trond Ivar Døvle |

| 3 August 2011 17 | Haugesund | 4–0 | Sogndal | Haugesund |
| 18:00 CEST (UTC+2) | Bamberg 3'; Pozniak 21'; Đurđić 40'; Søderlund 75' | Report | Bakke (yellow card) 19' Hansen (yellow card) 56'; Gjermundstad (yellow card) 76' | Stadium: Haugesund Stadion; Attendance: 4,559; Referee: Brage Sandmoen |
Note: Match originally scheduled for 24 May 2011, but postponed due to the 2011 Norway attacks.

| 8 August 2011 19 | Start | 1–4 | Haugesund | Kristiansand |
| 19:00 CEST (UTC+2) | Hanssen (yellow card) 63'; Dreshaj 89' | Report | Jóhannesson (yellow card) 27'; Søderlund 32', 41', 44'; Đurđić 36' | Stadium: Sør Arena; Attendance: 6,426; Referee: Ken Henry Johnsen |

| 21 August 2011 20 | Haugesund | 2–2 | Rosenborg | Haugesund |
| 18:00 CEST (UTC+2) | Sørum 64'; Bamberg 68'; Tronseth (yellow card) 81' | Report | Moldskred 4'; Prica 20'; Moldskred (yellow card) 31' | Stadium: Haugesund Stadion; Attendance: 4,950; Referee: Anders Johansen |

| 27 August 2011 21 | Vålerenga | 3–2 | Haugesund | Oslo |
| 18:00 CEST (UTC+2) | Singh (yellow card) 11' (goal) 25'; Ogude 50'; Berre 57'; Strandberg (yellow card) 65' | Report | Søderlund 44'; Jóhannesson (yellow card) 59'; Sørum (yellow card) 60' (goal) 89' | Stadium: Ullevaal Stadion; Attendance: 10,977; Referee: Dag Vidar Hafsås |

| 11 September 2011 22 | Haugesund | 2–0 | Lillestrøm | Haugesund |
| 18:00 CEST (UTC+2) | Andreassen (yellow card) 30' (goal) 63'; Skjerve (yellow card) 54'; Bangura (yellow card) 61'; Đurđić 76' | Report | Bassey (yellow card) 35'; Gulbrandsen (yellow card) 55'; Ringstad (yellow card) 62' | Stadium: Haugesund Stadion; Attendance: 4,319; Referee: Tom Harald Hagen |

| 16 September 2011 23 | Brann | 1–0 | Haugesund | Bergen |
| 19:00 CEST (UTC+2) | Sævarsson (yellow card) 29'; Grorud (yellow card) 58'; Ojo (yellow card) 80' (goal) 83' | Report | Đurđić (yellow card) 82' | Stadium: Brann Stadion; Attendance: 13,032; Referee: Espen Berntsen |

| 25 September 2011 24 | Haugesund | 1–0 | Aalesund | Haugesund |
| 18:00 CEST (UTC+2) | Skjerve (yellow card) 51'; Bangura 54' | Report | Carlsen (yellow card) 48' | Stadium: Haugesund Stadion; Attendance: 4,505; Referee: Dag Vidar Hafsås |

| 1 October 2011 25 | Viking | 1–1 | Haugesund | Stavanger |
| 18:00 CEST (UTC+2) | Bjarnason (yellow card) 13'; Danielsen 57' | Report | Pozniak (yellow card) 6'; Đurđić 90+3' (pen.) | Stadium: Viking Stadion; Attendance: 12,199; Referee: Kjetil Sælen |

| 16 October 2011 26 | Haugesund | 3–2 | Fredrikstad | Haugesund |
| 18:00 CEST (UTC+2) | Søderlund 12'; Anyora (yellow card) 31'; Bamberg 42'; Đurđić 53' | Report | Elyounoussi 29'; Hussain 35' (yellow card) 65'; Martinsen (yellow card) 84' | Stadium: Haugesund Stadion; Attendance: 4,420; Referee: Tore Hansen |

| 23 October 2011 27 | Odd | 1–0 | Haugesund | Skien |
| 18:00 CEST (UTC+2) | Børven 50'; Larsen (yellow card) 81' | Report | Decamps (yellow card) 89' | Stadium: Skagerak Arena; Attendance: 5,141; Referee: Svein-Erik Edvartsen |

| 28 October 2011 28 | Haugesund | 1–1 | Tromsø | Haugesund |
| 19:00 CEST (UTC+2) | Bangura (yellow card) 53'; Đurđić 79' (pen.) | Report | Ciss (yellow card) 24'; Koppinen 51'; Sahlman (yellow card) 78' | Stadium: Haugesund Stadion; Attendance: 4,628; Referee: Tommy Skjerven |

| 20 November 2011 29 | Stabæk | 1–2 | Haugesund | Bærum |
| 18:00 CET (UTC+1) | Ondo 89' | Report | Bamberg 34'; Søderlund 58' | Stadium: Telenor Arena; Attendance: 4,194; Referee: Per Ivar Staberg |

| 27 November 2011 30 | Haugesund | 5–1 | Strømsgodset | Haugesund |
| 18:00 CET (UTC+1) | Kamara 35' (o.g.); Andreassen 39'; Mæland 43'; Đurđić 67'; Bamberg 79' | Report | Johansen 8' (yellow card) 86'; Konradsen (yellow card) 46'; Kamara (yellow card) 59'; Andersen (yellow card) 62' | Stadium: Haugesund Stadion; Attendance: 4,082; Referee: Ola Hobber Nilsen |

==== Table ====
| Pos | Team | Pld | W | D | L | GF | GA | GD | Pts |
|---|---|---|---|---|---|---|---|---|---|
| 4 | Brann | 30 | 14 | 6 | 10 | 51 | 49 | +2 | 48 |
| 5 | Odd Grenland | 30 | 14 | 6 | 10 | 44 | 44 | 0 | 48 |
| 6 | Haugesund | 30 | 14 | 5 | 11 | 55 | 43 | +12 | 47 |
| 7 | Vålerenga | 30 | 14 | 5 | 11 | 42 | 33 | +9 | 47 |
| 8 | Strømsgodset | 30 | 12 | 9 | 9 | 44 | 43 | +1 | 45 |

Source: fotball.no
Rules for classification: 1) points; 2) goal difference; 3) number of goals scored.

=== Norwegian Cup ===
| 1 May 2011 First Round | Vaulen | 0–10 | Haugesund | Stavanger |
| 18:00 CEST (UTC+2) | | Summary | Andersen 3' (pen.), 62', 90', 90+2'; Søderlund 25', 36'; Sørum 41', 44'; Anyora 66'; Sørensen 87' | Stadium: Vaulenbanen; Attendance: 402; Referee: Jørn Voll |

| 11 May 2011 Second Round | Bjarg | 0–3 | Haugesund | Bergen |
| 18:00 CEST (UTC+2) | | Summary | Anyora (yellow card) 45'; Søderlund 55'; Andersen 72'; Stave 90+3' | Stadium: Stavollen Kunstgress; Attendance: 500; Referee: Steinar Hauge |

| 25 May 2011 Third Round | Randaberg | 3–5 | Haugesund | Randaberg |
| 18:00 CEST (UTC+2) | Andersen 22', 52' (yellow card) 73'; F.Norberg 55' | Summary | Đurđić 12'; Sørum 41'; T.Nordberg 49'; Søderlund 74'; Anyora (yellow card) 83'; Eike 90+3' (pen.) | Stadium: Randaberg Stadion; Attendance: 674; Referee: Anders Johansen |

| 22 June 2011 Fourth Round | Haugesund | 2–3 (a.e.t.) | Viking | Haugesund |
| 18:00 CEST (UTC+2) | Bamberg 18'; Skogseid 23' (o.g.); Đurđić (yellow card) 107' | Summary | Sæternes 45'; Nevland 89', 100' | Stadium: Haugesund Stadion; Attendance: 4,342; Referee: Svein-Erik Edvartsen |

== Squad statistics ==
As of match played 27 November 2011

=== Appearances and goals ===
| No. | Pos | Nat | Player | Total | | Tippeligaen | | Norwegian Cup | |
| No. | Pos | Nat | Player | Apps | Goals | Apps | Goals | Apps | Goals |
|---|---|---|---|---|---|---|---|---|---|
| 1 | GK | (Norway) NOR | Per Morten Kristiansen | 30 | 0 | 27 | 0 | 3 | 0 |
| 2 | DF | (Norway) NOR | Joakim Våge Nilsen | 16 | 0 | 16 | 0 | 0 | 0 |
| 3 | DF | (France) FRA | Derek Decamps | 6 | 0 | 2+4 | 0 | 0 | 0 |
| 4 | DF | (Canada) CAN | Chris Pozniak | 28 | 1 | 21+4 | 1 | 2+1 | 0 |
| 5 | MF | (Norway) NOR | Trygve Nygaard | 30 | 0 | 22+5 | 0 | 1+2 | 0 |
| 7 | MF | (Iceland) ISL | Andrés Már Jóhannesson | 7 | 0 | 5+2 | 0 | 0 | 0 |
| 9 | FW | (Norway) NOR | Alexander Søderlund | 33 | 15 | 20+9 | 11 | 4 | 4 |
| 10 | MF | (Sierra Leone) SLE | Umaru Bangura | 28 | 1 | 19+5 | 1 | 4 | 0 |
| 11 | DF | (Norway) NOR | Tor Arne Andreassen | 25 | 4 | 22 | 4 | 3 | 0 |
| 12 | GK | (Norway) NOR | Lars Øvernes | 4 | 0 | 3 | 0 | 1 | 0 |
| 13 | MF | (Norway) NOR | Eirik Mæland | 11 | 0 | 6+5 | 0 | 0 | 0 |
| 15 | DF | (Norway) NOR | Ole Kristian Kråkmo | 13 | 0 | 7+4 | 0 | 2 | 0 |
| 16 | MF | (Nigeria) NGA | Ugonna Anyora | 28 | 1 | 23+2 | 0 | 3 | 1 |
| 18 | DF | (Norway) NOR | Vegard Skjerve | 33 | 0 | 29 | 0 | 4 | 0 |
| 19 | DF | (Norway) NOR | Kristoffer Haraldseid | 8 | 0 | 2+6 | 0 | 0 | 0 |
| 21 | MF | (Norway) NOR | Eirik Ulland Andersen | 13 | 5 | 0+10 | 0 | 2+1 | 5 |
| 22 | FW | (Norway) NOR | Sten Ove Eike | 8 | 1 | 0+5 | 0 | 1+2 | 1 |
| 23 | MF | (Brazil) BRA | Daniel Bamberg | 31 | 9 | 27+1 | 8 | 3 | 1 |
| 25 | DF | (Norway) NOR | Are Tronseth | 14 | 0 | 8+6 | 0 | 0 | 0 |
| 26 | MF | (Norway) NOR | Fredrik Deilkås | 1 | 0 | 0+1 | 0 | 0 | 0 |
| 28 | FW | (Norway) NOR | Lars Hansen | 1 | 0 | 0+1 | 0 | 0 | 0 |
| 44 | FW | (Serbia) SRB | Nikola Đurđić | 29 | 15 | 27 | 14 | 1+1 | 1 |
| | MF | (Norway) NOR | Andreas Stave | 1 | 1 | 0 | 0 | 0+1 | 1 |
Players away from Haugesund on loan:
Players who left Haugesund during the season:
| 3 | DF | (Norway) NOR | Tom Erik Nordberg | 17 | 3 | 13+1 | 2 | 3 | 1 |
| 6 | FW | (Norway) NOR | Thomas Sørum | 24 | 13 | 18+2 | 10 | 4 | 3 |
| 8 | MF | (Denmark) DEN | Jacob Sørensen | 20 | 2 | 13+4 | 1 | 3 | 1 |

=== Goal scorers ===
| Place | Position | Nation | Number | Name | Tippeligaen | Norwegian Cup | Total |
|---|---|---|---|---|---|---|---|
| 1 | FW | (Serbia) | 44 | Nikola Đurđić | 14 | 1 | 15 |
| 1 | FW | (Norway) | 9 | Alexander Søderlund | 11 | 4 | 15 |
| 3 | FW | (Norway) | 6 | Thomas Sørum | 10 | 3 | 13 |
| 4 | MF | (Brazil) | 23 | Daniel Bamberg | 8 | 1 | 9 |
| 5 | MF | (Norway) | 21 | Eirik Ulland Andersen | 0 | 5 | 5 |
| 6 | MF | (Norway) | 11 | Tor Arne Andreassen | 4 | 0 | 4 |
| 7 | DF | (Norway) | 3 | Tom Erik Nordberg | 2 | 1 | 3 |
| 8 | MF | (Norway) | 13 | Eirik Mæland | 2 | 0 | 2 |
| 8 | | | | Own goal | 1 | 1 | 2 |
| 10 | DF | (Canada) | 4 | Chris Pozniak | 1 | 0 | 1 |
| 10 | MF | (Sierra Leone) | 10 | Umaru Bangura | 1 | 0 | 1 |
| 10 | MF | (Denmark) | 8 | Jacob Sørensen | 1 | 0 | 1 |
| 10 | MF | (Nigeria) | 16 | Ugonna Anyora | 0 | 1 | 1 |
| 10 | MF | (Denmark) | 8 | Jacob Sørensen | 0 | 1 | 1 |
| 10 | MF | (Norway) | | Andreas Stave | 0 | 1 | 1 |
| 10 | FW | (Norway) | 22 | Sten Ove Eike | 0 | 1 | 1 |
| | | | | TOTALS | 55 | 20 | 75 |

=== Clean sheets ===
| Place | Position | Nation | Number | Name | Tippeligaen | Norwegian Cup | Total |
|---|---|---|---|---|---|---|---|
| 1 | GK | (Norway) | 1 | Per Morten Kristiansen | 8 | 2 | 10 |
| | | | | TOTALS | 8 | 2 | 10 |

=== Disciplinary record ===
| Number | Nation | Position | Name | Tippeligaen | | Norwegian Cup | | Total | |
| Number | Nation | Position | Name | Booked | Sent off (straight red) | Booked | Sent off (straight red) | Booked | Sent off (straight red) |
| 3 | (France) | DF | Derek Decamps | 1 | 0 | 0 | 0 | 1 | 0 |
| 4 | (Canada) | DF | Chris Pozniak | 2 | 0 | 0 | 0 | 2 | 0 |
| 7 | (Iceland) | MF | Andrés Már Jóhannesson | 2 | 0 | 0 | 0 | 2 | 0 |
| 9 | (Norway) | FW | Alexander Søderlund | 2 | 0 | 0 | 0 | 2 | 0 |
| 10 | (Sierra Leone) | MF | Umaru Bangura | 5 | 1 | 0 | 0 | 5 | 1 |
| 11 | (Norway) | DF | Tor Arne Andreassen | 2 | 0 | 0 | 0 | 2 | 0 |
| 16 | (Nigeria) | MF | Ugonna Anyora | 3 | 0 | 2 | 0 | 5 | 0 |
| 18 | (Norway) | DF | Vegard Skjerve | 3 | 0 | 0 | 0 | 3 | 0 |
| 23 | (Brazil) | MF | Daniel Bamberg | 1 | 0 | 0 | 0 | 1 | 0 |
| 25 | (Norway) | DF | Are Tronseth | 1 | 0 | 0 | 0 | 1 | 0 |
| 44 | (Serbia) | FW | Nikola Đurđić | 3 | 0 | 1 | 0 | 4 | 0 |
Players who left Haugesund during the season:
| 3 | (Norway) | DF | Tom Erik Nordberg | 1 | 0 | 0 | 0 | 1 | 0 |
| 6 | (Norway) | FW | Thomas Sørum | 1 | 0 | 0 | 0 | 1 | 0 |
| | | | TOTALS | 27 | 2 | 3 | 0 | 30 | 2 |
