= 2010 FK Haugesund season =

Haugesund
2010 season
- Chairman: Leif Helge Kaldheim
- Manager: Jostein Grindhaug
- Stadium: Haugesund Stadion
- Tippeligaen: 6th
- Norwegian Cup: Fourth round vs Strømsgodset
- Top goalscorer: League: Nikola Đurđić (12); All: Nikola Đurđić (17)
Home colours	Away colours

The 2010 season was Haugesund's 1st season in the Tippeligaen following their promotion in 2009, their 2nd season with Jostein Grindhaug as manager and 8th season in existence. They finished the season in 6th position, whilst also reaching the Fourth round of the Norwegian Cup.

== Squad ==
Note: Flags indicate national team as defined under FIFA eligibility rules; some limited exceptions apply. Players may hold more than one non-FIFA nationality.

No.	Pos.	Nation	Player
1	GK	NOR	Per Morten Kristiansen
2	DF	NOR	Joakim Våge Nilsen
3	MF	SLO	Rok Elsner
4	DF	CAN	Chris Pozniak
5	MF	NOR	Trygve Nygaard
6	FW	NOR	Thomas Sørum
7	MF	DEN	Martin Christensen
8	MF	DEN	Jacob Sørensen
9	FW	SWE	John Pelu
11	MF	NOR	Tor Arne Andreassen
12	GK	NOR	Lars Øvernes

No.	Pos.	Nation	Player
13	MF	NOR	Eirik Mæland
14	MF	NOR	Jarle Steinsland
15	DF	DEN	Allan Olesen
16	MF	NGR	Ugonna Anyora
17	MF	NOR	Dag Roar Ørsal
18	DF	NOR	Vegard Skjerve
20	GK	FIN	Juska Savolainen
22	FW	NOR	Sten Ove Eike
24	GK	NED	Beau Molenaar
25	DF	NOR	Are Tronseth
44	FW	SRB	Nikola Đurđić

== Transfers ==
=== Winter ===
In: Note: Flags indicate national team as defined under FIFA eligibility rules; some limited exceptions apply. Players may hold more than one non-FIFA nationality.

No.	Pos.	Nation	Player
4	DF	CAN	Chris Pozniak (from (Canada) Vancouver Whitecaps)
8	MF	DEN	Martin Christensen (from (Italy) Rimini)
15	DF	DEN	Allan Olesen (from (Denmark) Randers)
20	MF	FIN	Juska Savolainen (from (Norway) Rosenborg)

Out: Note: Flags indicate national team as defined under FIFA eligibility rules; some limited exceptions apply. Players may hold more than one non-FIFA nationality.

No.	Pos.	Nation	Player
3	DF	SWE	Elias Storm
8	DF	NOR	Eirik Horneland
8	MF	NOR	Aleksander Stølås
30	DF	SWE	Niklas Sandberg (to (Singapore) SAFFC)

=== Summer ===
In: Note: Flags indicate national team as defined under FIFA eligibility rules; some limited exceptions apply. Players may hold more than one non-FIFA nationality.

No.	Pos.	Nation	Player
3	MF	SLO	Rok Elsner (from (Kuwait) Al-Arabi)
16	MF	NGR	Ugonna Anyora

Out: Note: Flags indicate national team as defined under FIFA eligibility rules; some limited exceptions apply. Players may hold more than one non-FIFA nationality.

No.	Pos.	Nation	Player
10	MF	CIV	Victorien Djedje

== Competitions ==
=== Tippeligaen ===
==== Results summary ====
Overall								Home						Away					
Pld	W	D	L	GF	GA	GD	Pts	W	D	L	GF	GA	GD	W	D	L	GF	GA	GD
30	12	9	9	51	39	+12	45	9	5	1	34	13	+21	3	4	8	17	26	−9

Last updated: 13 March 2016.
Source: see below

==== Results by round ====
Round	1	2	3	4	5	6	7	8	9	10	11	12	13	14	15	16	17	18	19	20	21	22	23	24	25	26	27	28	29	30
Ground	A	H	A	H	A	H	A	H	A	A	H	A	H	A	H	H	A	H	A	H	A	H	A	H	A	H	H	A	H	A
Result	D	D	L	W	L	W	D	W	D	L	D	L	W	L	W	D	L	W	L	W	W	D	W	D	L	W	W	W	L	D
Position	8	12	13	8	10	9	10	7	8	9	10	12	10	11	9	10	11	10	10	9	8	8	5	6	8	5	4	4	6	6

Source: see below
A = Away; H = Home; W = Win; D = Draw; L = Loss

==== Results ====
13 March 2010 1	Brann	0–0	Haugesund	Bergen
17:00 CET (UTC+1)	Austin (yellow card) 20'; Jaiteh (yellow card) 32'	Summary	Pelu (yellow card) 35'; Tronseth (yellow card) 87'	Stadium: Brann Stadion; Attendance: 15,005; Referee: Tommy Skjerven

21 March 2010 2	Haugesund	2–2	Strømsgodset	Haugesund
18:00 CET (UTC+1)	Sørum 38'; Pozniak (yellow card) 54'; Nilsen 83'	Summary	Berget 58'; Storflor 60' (yellow card) 72'; Riddez (yellow card) 86'	Stadium: Haugesund Stadion; Attendance: 5,000; Referee: Dag Vidar Hafsås

28 March 2010 3	Odd	4–1	Haugesund	Skien
18:00 CEST (UTC+2)	Bentley 46', 76'; Brenne 70'; Kovács 73'	Summary	Pozniak (yellow card) 2'; Sørum 80'	Stadium: Skagerak Arena; Attendance: 6,149; Referee: Brage Sandmoen

5 April 2010 4	Haugesund	5–1	Hønefoss	Haugesund
18:00 CEST (UTC+2)	Andreassen 3'; Nygaard 24'; Sørum 24'; Đurđić 90'; Steinsland 90'	Summary	Saaliti 14'; Olsen (yellow card) 30'; Sigurðsson (yellow card) 85'	Stadium: Haugesund Stadion; Attendance: 4,812; Referee: Svein-Erik Edvartsen

11 April 2010 5	Tromsø	2–0	Haugesund	Tromsø
18:00 CEST (UTC+2)	Johansen 3'; Yndestad (yellow card) 71'; Rushfeldt 82'	Summary		Stadium: Alfheim Stadion; Attendance: 3,896; Referee: Per Ivar Staberg

14 April 2010 6	Haugesund	2–1	Aalesund	Haugesund
19:00 CEST (UTC+2)	Aarøy 4' (o.g.); Pelu 17'; Andreassen (yellow card) 27'	Summary	Carlsen (yellow card) 37'; Roberts 38'; Parr (red card) 89'	Stadium: Haugesund Stadion; Attendance: 4,633; Referee: Terje Hauge

18 April 2010 7	Lillestrøm	1–1	Haugesund	Lillestrøm
18:00 CEST (UTC+2)	Nsaliwa 50' (pen.) (yellow card) 90'	Summary	Pozniak 13'; Nygaard (yellow card) 45'; Olesen (yellow card) 49'; Andreassen (yellow card) 52'	Stadium: Åråsen Stadion; Attendance: 6,553; Referee: Dag Vidar Hafsås

25 April 2010 8	Haugesund	3–0	Kongsvinger	Haugesund
18:00 CEST (UTC+2)	Sørensen 5'; Sørum 87'; Steinsland 87'	Summary	Risholt (yellow card) 27'; Myhre (yellow card) 35'; Frejd (yellow card) 53'	Stadium: Haugesund Stadion; Attendance: 4,555; Referee: Brage Sandmoen

2 May 2010 9	Stabæk	0–0	Haugesund	Oslo
18:00 CEST (UTC+2)		Summary	Nygaard 48'; Tronseth (yellow card) 90'	Stadium: Ullevaal Stadion; Attendance: 6,661; Referee: Kristoffer Helgerud

5 May 2010 10	Viking	1–0	Haugesund	Stavanger
19:00 CEST (UTC+2)	Bjarnason 44'	Summary	Andreassen (yellow card) 62'	Stadium: Viking Stadion; Attendance: 13,231; Referee: Espen Berntsen

9 May 2010 11	Haugesund	0–0	Rosenborg	Haugesund
18:00 CEST (UTC+2)	Đurđić (yellow card) 26'; Mæland (yellow card) 40'	Summary	Prica (yellow card) 29'; Henriksen (yellow card) 56'	Stadium: Haugesund Stadion; Attendance: 5,000; Referee: Tom Harald Hagen

16 May 2010 12	Molde	2–1	Haugesund	Molde
16:00 CEST (UTC+2)	Fall 10'; Skjerve 58' (o.g.)	Summary	Pozniak (yellow card) 41'; Đurđić 60'	Stadium: Aker Stadion; Attendance: 9,000; Referee: Dag Vidar Hafsås

24 May 2010 13	Haugesund	2–0	Sandefjord	Haugesund
18:00 CEST (UTC+2)	Mæland 22' (pen.); Andreassen 36'; Nygaard (yellow card) 59'	Summary	Nystuen (yellow card) 2'	Stadium: Haugesund Stadion; Attendance: 4,459; Referee: Kjetil Sælen

6 June 2010 14	Vålerenga	5–2	Haugesund	Oslo
18:00 CEST (UTC+2)	Abdellaoue 21'; Fellah 29'; Nordvik (yellow card) 39'; Berre 42' dos Santos 51'; Muri 70'	Summary	Mæland (yellow card) 45' (goal) 55' (pen.); Skjerve (yellow card) 68'; Sørensen 79'	Stadium: Ullevaal Stadion; Attendance: 12,906; Referee: Svein-Erik Edvartsen

4 July 2010 15	Haugesund	4–2	Start	Haugesund
18:00 CEST (UTC+2)	Sørensen 14'; Sørum 19', 78'; Mæland 73' (pen.); Tronseth (red card) 90'	Summary	Bolaños (yellow card) 3'; Børufsen (yellow card) 37' (goal) 51'; Goodson (yellow card) 73'; Fevang 90'	Stadium: Haugesund Stadion; Attendance: 4,056; Referee: Tommy Skjerven

10 July 2010 16	Haugesund	1–1	Brann	Haugesund
18:00 CEST (UTC+2)	Mæland 45'; Andreassen (yellow card) 78'; Nygaard (yellow card) 86'	Summary	Mjelde (yellow card) 14' (goal) 24'; Bakke (yellow card) 29'; Bjarnason (yellow card) 72'; El Fakiri (yellow card) 80'; Moen (yellow card) 90'	Stadium: Haugesund Stadion; Attendance: 5,000; Referee: Kristoffer Helgerud

18 July 2010 17	Strømsgodset	2–1	Haugesund	Drammen
18:00 CEST (UTC+2)	Andersen 59'; Pedersen 62'; Keita (yellow card) 90'	Summary	Đurđić (yellow card) 35'; Ørsal 72'; Steinsland (yellow card) 82'	Stadium: Marienlyst Stadion; Attendance: 5,031; Referee: Tom Harald Hagen

25 July 2010 18	Haugesund	4–0	Viking	Haugesund
18:00 CEST (UTC+2)	Andreassen 5', 45'; Sørensen 37'; Đurđić 45'	Summary	Bertelsen (yellow card) 26'	Stadium: Haugesund Stadion; Attendance: 5,000; Referee: Per Ivar Staberg

1 August 2010 19	Rosenborg	4–3	Haugesund	Trondheim
CEST (UTC+2)	Iversen 11', 50', 75'; Skjerve 22' (o.g.)	Summary	Đurđić 16'; Tronseth 20'; Nilsen 31' (yellow card) 90'	Stadium: Lerkendal Stadion; Attendance: 14,652; Referee: Kjetil Sælen

8 August 2010 20	Haugesund	2–0	Vålerenga	Haugesund
18:00 CEST (UTC+2)	Đurđić (yellow card) 45' (goal) 69' (pen.); Sørum 88'	Summary	Sæternes (yellow card) 11'; Berre (yellow card) 58'; Fellah (yellow card) 82'	Stadium: Haugesund Stadion; Attendance: 5,000; Referee: Roy Helge Olsen

22 August 2010 21	Kongsvinger	0–1	Haugesund	Kongsvinger
18:00 CEST (UTC+2)	Shindika (yellow card) 90'	Summary	Steinsland 66'; Nilsen (yellow card) 72'	Stadium: Gjemselund Stadion; Attendance: 2,806; Referee: Brage Sandmoen

28 August 2010 22	Haugesund	0–0	Tromsø	Haugesund
17:00 CEST (UTC+2)	Andreassen (yellow card) 56'	Summary	Høgli (yellow card) 31'	Stadium: Haugesund Stadion; Attendance: 4,179; Referee: Tom Henning Øvrebø

12 September 2010 23	Hønefoss	0–2	Haugesund	Hønefoss
18:00 CEST (UTC+2)	Hagen (yellow card) 20'; Obiefule (yellow card) 26'; Saaliti (yellow card) 90'	Summary	Sørum 12', 18'	Stadium: Aka Arena; Attendance: 2,711; Referee: Tom Harald Hagen

20 September 2010 24	Haugesund	3–3	Lillestrøm	Haugesund
19:00 CEST (UTC+2)	Đurđić 45', 47' (yellow card) 85'; Steinsland (yellow card) 63'; Tronseth 72'	Summary	Sundgot 38'; Mouelhi 54'; Kippe 63'	Stadium: Haugesund Stadion; Attendance: 4,202; Referee: Svein-Erik Edvartsen

26 September 2010 25	Aalesund	2–1	Haugesund	Ålesund
18:00 CEST (UTC+2)	Fredriksen 18' (yellow card) 22'; Aarøy 19'	Summary	Đurđić 43'	Stadium: Color Line Stadion; Attendance: 9,827; Referee: Terje Hauge

3 October 2010 26	Haugesund	3–0	Odd Grenland	Haugesund
18:00 CEST (UTC+2)	Steinsland 38'; Andreassen 45'; Sørum 48'; Tronseth (yellow card) 69'	Summary	Rambekk (yellow card) 62'	Stadium: Haugesund Stadion; Attendance: 4,102; Referee: Ken Henry Johnsen

17 October 2010 27	Haugesund	2–1	Stabæk	Haugesund
18:00 CEST (UTC+2)	Andreassen 22'; Sørum 30'; Sørensen (yellow card) 66'	Summary	Pálmason 9' (yellow card) 44' (yellow-red card) 69'; Gunnarsson (yellow card) 78'	Stadium: Haugesund Stadion; Attendance: 5,000; Referee: Terje Hauge

24 October 2010 28	Sandefjord	0–1	Haugesund	Sandefjord
18:00 CEST (UTC+2)	Bindia (yellow card) 45'	Summary	Steinsland (yellow card) 27'; Skjerve (yellow card) 31'; Đurđić 80' (pen.)	Stadium: Komplett Arena; Attendance: 3,512; Referee: Kristoffer Helgerud

31 October 2010 29	Haugesund	1–2	Molde	Haugesund
18:00 CET (UTC+1)	Nygaard (yellow card) 31'; Đurđić 68' (pen.); Sørum (yellow card) 87'	Summary	Forren (yellow card) 6'; Hoseth 25' (yellow card) 29'; Fall 56'	Stadium: Haugesund Stadion; Attendance: 4,914; Referee: Brage Sandmoen

7 November 2010 30	Start	3–3	Haugesund	Kristiansand
18:00 CET (UTC+1)	Hoff 23'; Børufsen 76'; Hulsker 79' (yellow card) 82'	Summary	Pozniak (red card) 20'; Đurđić 36', 75'; Sørensen 42'; Tronseth (yellow card) 79'; Andreassen (yellow card) 82'	Stadium: Sør Arena; Attendance: 6,889; Referee: Trond Ivar Døvle

==== Table ====
Pos	Team	Pld	W	D	L	GF	GA	GD	Pts	Qualification or relegation
4	Aalesund	30	14	5	11	46	37	+9	47	Qualification for the Europa League first qualifying round (Note: Norway was among the best three associations in the UEFA Fair Play ranking and thus received an additional spot in the first qualifying round of the Europa League.)
5	Odd Grenland	30	12	10	8	48	41	+7	46	
6	Haugesund	30	12	9	9	51	39	+12	45	
7	Strømsgodset	30	13	4	13	51	59	−8	43	Qualification for the Europa League third qualifying round (Note: Strømsgodset qualified for the third qualifying round of the UEFA Europa League as winners of the 2010 Norwegian Cup.)
8	Start	30	11	9	10	57	60	−3	42	

Source: fotball.no
Rules for classification: 1) points; 2) goal difference; 3) number of goals scored.

=== Norwegian Cup ===
13 May 2010 First Round	Klepp	0–4	Haugesund	Kleppe
18:00 CEST (UTC+2)		Report	Đurđić 40', 42'; Ørsal 76'; Djedje 90+2'	Stadium: Klepp Stadium; Attendance: 420; Referee: Trond Egil Hansen

19 May 2010 Second Round	Vard Haugesund	1–2	Haugesund	Haugesund
18:00 CEST (UTC+2)	Ø.Liestøl 27'; R.Løvland (yellow card) 90+1'	Report	Pelu (yellow card) 42'; Đurđić 71'; Sørensen (yellow card) 74'; Sørum 78'	Stadium: Haugesund Stadion; Attendance: 1,650; Referee: Tomas Østerhus Tjelle

9 June 2010 Third Round	Haugesund	6–1	Bryne	Haugesund
18:00 CEST (UTC+2)	Đurđić 7', 58'; Sørum 9'; Sørensen 42'; Skjerve 49', 89'; Tronseth (yellow card) 51'	Report	Bala 34'; H.Stenersen (yellow card) 37'	Stadium: Haugesund Stadion; Attendance: 1,788; Referee: Terje Hauge

7 July 2010 Fourth Round	Strømsgodset	3–0	Haugesund	Drammen
18:00 CEST (UTC+2)	Rnkovic 9'; Pedersen 41', 71'	Report		Stadium: Marienlyst Stadion; Attendance: 2,133; Referee: Per Ivar Staberg

== Squad statistics ==
As of match played 7 November 2010

=== Appearances and goals ===
No.	Pos	Nat	Player	Total		Tippeligaen		Norwegian Cup	
No.	Pos	Nat	Player	Apps	Goals	Apps	Goals	Apps	Goals
1	GK	(Norway) NOR	Per Morten Kristiansen	31	0	29	0	2	0
2	DF	(Norway) NOR	Joakim Våge Nilsen	31	0	28	0	3	0
3	MF	(Slovenia) SLO	Rok Elsner	5	0	4+1	0	0	0
4	DF	(Canada) CAN	Chris Pozniak	32	0	28	0	4	0
5	MF	(Norway) NOR	Trygve Nygaard	30	0	28	0	2	0
6	FW	(Norway) NOR	Thomas Sørum	31	2	28	0	3	2
7	MF	(Denmark) DEN	Martin Christensen	16	0	6+8	0	2	0
8	MF	(Denmark) DEN	Jacob Sørensen	30	1	27	0	3	1
9	FW	(Sweden) SWE	John Pelu	21	0	8+10	0	1+2	0
11	MF	(Norway) NOR	Tor Arne Andreassen	30	0	26+1	0	3	0
12	GK	(Norway) NOR	Lars Øvernes	3	0	1	0	2	0
13	MF	(Norway) NOR	Eirik Mæland	23	0	16+5	0	1+1	0
14	MF	(Norway) NOR	Jarle Steinsland	25	0	14+9	0	0+2	0
15	DF	(Denmark) DEN	Allan Olesen	11	0	5+4	0	2	0
16	MF	(Nigeria) NGR	Ugonna Anyora	2	0	0+2	0	0	0
17	MF	(Norway) NOR	Dag Roar Ørsal	10	1	1+5	0	3+1	1
18	DF	(Norway) NOR	Vegard Skjerve	31	2	28	0	3	2
20	MF	(Finland) FIN	Juska Savolainen	18	0	2+12	0	3+1	0
22	FW	(Norway) NOR	Sten Ove Eike	18	0	0+14	0	1+3	0
25	DF	(Norway) NOR	Are Tronseth	31	0	28	0	3	0
44	FW	(Serbia) SRB	Nikola Đurđić	30	5	23+4	0	2+1	5
	DF	(Norway) NOR	Erik Anglevik	1	0	0	0	1	0
Players away from Haugesund on loan:
Players who left Haugesund during the season:
10	MF	(Ivory Coast) CIV	Victorien Djedje	1	1	0	0	0+1	1

=== Goal scorers ===
Place	Position	Nation	Number	Name	Tippeligaen	Norwegian Cup	Total
1	FW	(Serbia)	44	Nikola Đurđić	12	5	17
2	FW	(Norway)	6	Thomas Sørum	11	2	13
3	MF	(Norway)	11	Tor Arne Andreassen	6	0	6
3	MF	(Denmark)	8	Jacob Sørensen	5	1	6
5	MF	(Norway)	13	Eirik Mæland	4	0	4
5	MF	(Norway)	14	Jarle Steinsland	4	0	4
7	DF	(Norway)	25	Are Tronseth	2	0	2
7	DF	(Norway)	2	Joakim Våge Nilsen	2	0	2
7	MF	(Norway)	17	Dag Roar Ørsal	1	1	1
7	DF	(Norway)	18	Vegard Skjerve	0	2	2
10	MF	(Norway)	5	Trygve Nygaard	1	0	1
10	FW	(Sweden)	9	John Pelu	1	0	1
10	DF	(Canada)	4	Chris Pozniak	1	0	1
10	MF	(Ivory Coast)	10	Victorien Djedje	0	1	1
				TOTALS	51	12	63

=== Disciplinary record ===
Number	Nation	Position	Name	Tippeligaen		Norwegian Cup		Total	
Number	Nation	Position	Name	Yellow card	Red card	Yellow card	Red card	Yellow card	Red card
2	(Norway)	DF	Joakim Våge Nilsen	2	0	0	0	2	0
4	(Canada)	DF	Chris Pozniak	3	1	0	0	3	1
5	(Norway)	MF	Trygve Nygaard	4	0	0	0	4	0
6	(Norway)	FW	Thomas Sørum	1	0	0	0	1	0
8	(Denmark)	MF	Jacob Sørensen	1	0	1	0	2	0
9	(Sweden)	FW	John Pelu	1	0	1	0	2	0
11	(Norway)	MF	Tor Arne Andreassen	6	0	0	0	6	0
13	(Norway)	MF	Eirik Mæland	2	0	0	0	2	0
14	(Norway)	MF	Jarle Steinsland	3	0	0	0	3	0
15	(Denmark)	DF	Allan Olesen	1	0	0	0	1	0
18	(Norway)	DF	Vegard Skjerve	2	0	0	0	2	0
25	(Norway)	DF	Are Tronseth	4	1	1	0	5	1
44	(Serbia)	FW	Nikola Đurđić	4	0	1	0	5	0
			TOTALS	34	2	3	0	37	2
