= List of Norwegian football transfers 2010 =

This is a list of Norway football transfers for the 2010 transfer window. Only moves featuring at least one Tippeligaen club are listed.

== Stabæk ==
In: Note: Flags indicate national team as defined under FIFA eligibility rules; some limited exceptions apply. Players may hold more than one non-FIFA nationality.

No.	Pos.	Nation	Player
—	DF	NOR	Kristian Flittie Onstad (from Esbjerg fB)
—	FW	ISL	Veigar Páll Gunnarsson (from AS Nancy)
—	DF	ISL	Bjarni Ólafur Eiríksson (from Valur)
—	MF	BRA	Diogo da Costa Oliveira (from Internacional Porto Alegre)

Out: Note: Flags indicate national team as defined under FIFA eligibility rules; some limited exceptions apply. Players may hold more than one non-FIFA nationality.

No.	Pos.	Nation	Player
—	DF	NOR	Thomas Rogne (To Celtic)
—	DF	NOR	Inge Andre Olsen (Retired)

== Rosenborg ==
In: Note: Flags indicate national team as defined under FIFA eligibility rules; some limited exceptions apply. Players may hold more than one non-FIFA nationality.

No.	Pos.	Nation	Player
1	GK	SWE	Daniel Örlund (From AIK) (Note: Örlund: - The goal is Champions League)
—	GK	NOR	Erik Mellevold Bråthen (from Fredrikstad FK)
8	MF	NOR	Fredrik Winsnes (from Strømsgodset IF) (Note: Winsnes to Rosenborg)
—	DF	NOR	Simen Søraunet Wangberg (from Rosenborg BK Youth)
—	FW	NOR	Michael Kleppe Jamtfall (loan return from Ranheim IL)
—	FW	NOR	Morten Moldskred (from Tromsø IL)

Out: Note: Flags indicate national team as defined under FIFA eligibility rules; some limited exceptions apply. Players may hold more than one non-FIFA nationality.

No.	Pos.	Nation	Player
1	GK	NOR	Alexander Lund Hansen (to OB) (Note: Lund Hansen to Odense)
12	GK	NOR	Rune Jarstein (to Viking)
16	MF	NOR	Albert Berbatovci (to Ranheim IL)
17	MF	NOR	Pål André Helland (on loan to Ranheim IL)
19	MF	FIN	Juska Savolainen (to FK Haugesund) (Note: Savolainen to Haugesund)
21	FW	NOR	Jo Sondre Aas (on loan to Ranheim IL)
36	FW	NOR	Michael Karlsen (on loan to Ranheim IL)
—	FW	SWE	John Pelu (FK Haugesund, used to be on loan with the club) (Note: Fra RBK til Haugesund)

== Lyn ==
In: Note: Flags indicate national team as defined under FIFA eligibility rules; some limited exceptions apply. Players may hold more than one non-FIFA nationality.

No.	Pos.	Nation	Player
—	MF	NOR	Steinar Strømnes (from Kongsvinger)

Out: Note: Flags indicate national team as defined under FIFA eligibility rules; some limited exceptions apply. Players may hold more than one non-FIFA nationality.

No.	Pos.	Nation	Player
9	MF	AUS	Kasey Wehrman (loan return to Fredrikstad FK) (Note: KASEY WEHRMAN - Wehrman ferdig i Lyn)
18	FW	NOR	Jo Inge Berget (to Strømsgodset I.F. via Udinese)
22	DF	NOR	Tommy Berntsen (End of Career) (Note: Send din hilsen til Lyn-kaptein Tommy Berntsen her!)
27	DF	NOR	Magne Simonsen (to Molde FK)
25	DF	NGR	Paul Obiefule (to Hønefoss)
14	FW	NOR	Kim Holmen (to Kongsvinger Toppfotball)
15	MF	NOR	Erling Knudtzon (to Lillestrøm SK)

== Lillestrøm ==
In: Note: Flags indicate national team as defined under FIFA eligibility rules; some limited exceptions apply. Players may hold more than one non-FIFA nationality.

No.	Pos.	Nation	Player
—	DF	ISL	Viktor Bjarki Arnarsson (loan return from Nybergsund IL-Trysil)
—	MF	NOR	Erling Knudtzon (loan from Lyn)
—	FW	NOR	Tarik Elyounoussi (loan from SC Heerenveen)
—	FW	NGR	Anthony Ujah (loan from Warri Wolves)

Out: Note: Flags indicate national team as defined under FIFA eligibility rules; some limited exceptions apply. Players may hold more than one non-FIFA nationality.

No.	Pos.	Nation	Player
4	DF	JAM	Adrian Reid (loan return to Portmore)
—	FW	NOR	Tore Andreas Gundersen (to Dynamo Dresden)

== Aalesund ==
In: Note: Flags indicate national team as defined under FIFA eligibility rules; some limited exceptions apply. Players may hold more than one non-FIFA nationality.

No.	Pos.	Nation	Player
—	DF	EST	Enar Jääger (from Ascoli)
—	MF	NOR	Magnus Sylling Olsen (from Kongsvinger)
—	MF	NOR	Fredrik Carlsen (loan from Vålerenga)

Out: Note: Flags indicate national team as defined under FIFA eligibility rules; some limited exceptions apply. Players may hold more than one non-FIFA nationality.

No.	Pos.	Nation	Player
12	GK	NOR	Andreas Lie (End of contract)
24	GK	USA	Adin Brown (End of contract)
31	DF	HON	Reinieri Mayorquín (loan return to CD Marathón) (Note: Mayorquín skrev under)

== Tromsø ==
In: Note: Flags indicate national team as defined under FIFA eligibility rules; some limited exceptions apply. Players may hold more than one non-FIFA nationality.

No.	Pos.	Nation	Player
13	GK	CAN	Kenny Stamatopoulos (loan return from Fredrikstad FK) (Note: FFK henter Kenny Stamatopoulos)
—	DF	SEN	Serigne Kara (from Diambars)
—	DF	AUS	Jade North (from Incheon United)
—	DF	NOR	Hans Norbye (from Tromsdalen)
—	FW	NOR	Vegard Braaten (from Alta)

Out: Note: Flags indicate national team as defined under FIFA eligibility rules; some limited exceptions apply. Players may hold more than one non-FIFA nationality.

No.	Pos.	Nation	Player
13	GK	NOR	Espen Isaksen (End of Career)
3	DF	NOR	Tore Reginiussen (to Schalke 04)
—	DF	AUS	Jade North (to Wellington Phoenix FC)
4	FW	NOR	Morten Moldskred (to Rosenborg BK) (Note: Espen Isaksen gir seg | ba-avis.no)

== Bodø/Glimt ==
In: Note: Flags indicate national team as defined under FIFA eligibility rules; some limited exceptions apply. Players may hold more than one non-FIFA nationality.

No.	Pos.	Nation	Player

Out: Note: Flags indicate national team as defined under FIFA eligibility rules; some limited exceptions apply. Players may hold more than one non-FIFA nationality.

No.	Pos.	Nation	Player
10	FW	NOR	Jan Derek Sørensen (End of Career) (Note: Årets siste kamp!)
16	MF	NOR	Stig Johansen (End of Career) (Note: Stig Johansen vil ikke fortsette i Glimt | adressa.no)
22	DF	NOR	Even Iversen (End of contract) (Note: Årets siste kamp!)

== Fredrikstad ==
In: Note: Flags indicate national team as defined under FIFA eligibility rules; some limited exceptions apply. Players may hold more than one non-FIFA nationality.

No.	Pos.	Nation	Player
7	MF	AUS	Kasey Wehrman (loan return from Lyn Oslo) (Note: KASEY WEHRMAN - - Derfor rykket Fredrikstad ned)

Out: Note: Flags indicate national team as defined under FIFA eligibility rules; some limited exceptions apply. Players may hold more than one non-FIFA nationality.

No.	Pos.	Nation	Player
1	GK	CAN	Kenny Stamatopoulos (loan return to Tromsø IL)
10	FW	GHA	Dominic Adiyiah (to AC Milan)
11	FW	BRA	Éverton (loan return to Adap Galo Maringá)
14	MF	NOR	Raymond Kvisvik (to Kvik Halden FK) (Note: Fredrikstad fotballklubb - Kvisvik klar for Kvik Halden)
20	MF	DEN	Daniel Wass (loan return to Brøndby IF) (Note: Daniel Wass: Jeg vil blive i Brøndby | Tipsbladet)
25	GK	NOR	Erik Mellevold Bråthen (to Rosenborg BK)

== Strømsgodset ==
In: Note: Flags indicate national team as defined under FIFA eligibility rules; some limited exceptions apply. Players may hold more than one non-FIFA nationality.

No.	Pos.	Nation	Player
—	DF	NOR	Lars Sætra (from Strømsgodset Youth) (Note: Lars Sætra signerte proffkontrakt med Godset)
—	MF	NOR	Kjetil Lundebakken (from Strømsgodset Youth) (Note: Lundebakken og Sætra forlenget med Godset)
—	FW	NOR	Jo Inge Berget (from Lyn)
—	GK	NOR	Lars Stubhaug (from Everton)

Out: Note: Flags indicate national team as defined under FIFA eligibility rules; some limited exceptions apply. Players may hold more than one non-FIFA nationality.

No.	Pos.	Nation	Player
3	DF	NOR	Vidar Riseth (to Kongsvinger IL) (Note: Vidar Riseths siste fotballkamp)
8	DF	NOR	Ousman Nyan (End of Career) (Note: Ousman Nyan takket for seg)
20	MF	SWE	Mattias Andersson (to Fredrikstad FK) (Note: Mattias Andersson klar for FFK | NorskeFans.com | Norsk fotball)
21	MF	NOR	Fredrik Winsnes (to Rosenborg BK) (Note: Fredrik Winsnes snakker ut om overgangen til Rosenborg)

== Molde ==
In: Note: Flags indicate national team as defined under FIFA eligibility rules; some limited exceptions apply. Players may hold more than one non-FIFA nationality.

No.	Pos.	Nation	Player
—	GK	ENG	Ben Amos (on loan from Manchester United)
—	DF	NOR	Magne Simonsen (from Lyn)
—	DF	SWE	Emil Johansson (from Hammarby)
—	FW	SEN	Baye Djiby Fall (on loan from Lokomotiv Moscow with an option to buy)

Out: Note: Flags indicate national team as defined under FIFA eligibility rules; some limited exceptions apply. Players may hold more than one non-FIFA nationality.

No.	Pos.	Nation	Player
32	FW	SEN	Mame Biram Diouf (loan return to Manchester United) (Note: Manchester United ponder Mame Biram Diouf recall from Molde)
20	FW	NOR	Rune Ertsås (loan to Sandefjord Fotball)

== Start ==
In: Note: Flags indicate national team as defined under FIFA eligibility rules; some limited exceptions apply. Players may hold more than one non-FIFA nationality.

No.	Pos.	Nation	Player
1	FW	NOR	Rune Nilsen (loan return from FC Copenhagen) (Note: Jeg er den kjedeligste på laget - IK Starts offisielle websider)
19	MF	BRA	Ygor (loan return from Portuguesa) (Note: Manchester United ponder Mame Biram Diouf recall from Molde)
22	DF	NOR	Leif Otto Paulsen (loan return from Bryne FK)

Out: Note: Flags indicate national team as defined under FIFA eligibility rules; some limited exceptions apply. Players may hold more than one non-FIFA nationality.

No.	Pos.	Nation	Player

== Viking ==
In: Note: Flags indicate national team as defined under FIFA eligibility rules; some limited exceptions apply. Players may hold more than one non-FIFA nationality.

No.	Pos.	Nation	Player
1	GK	NOR	Rune Jarstein (from Rosenborg BK)
5	MF	ISL	Stefan Gislason (on loan from Brøndby IF)
9	FW	SWE	Patrik Ingelsten (from SC Heerenveen)
—	FW	NOR	Erik Nevland (from Fulham FC, joining Viking 1 August 2010)

Out: Note: Flags indicate national team as defined under FIFA eligibility rules; some limited exceptions apply. Players may hold more than one non-FIFA nationality.

No.	Pos.	Nation	Player
1	GK	NOR	Thomas Myhre (Released from contract)
5	DF	NOR	Thomas Pereira (End of Career) (Note: Pereira får testimonial-kamp)
9	FW	NGR	Peter Ijeh (End of Contract)
27	FW	SEN	Mame Niang (to Kongsvinger)
99	MF	NOR	Jone Samuelsen (to Odd Grenland)

== Odd Grenland ==
In: Note: Flags indicate national team as defined under FIFA eligibility rules; some limited exceptions apply. Players may hold more than one non-FIFA nationality.

No.	Pos.	Nation	Player
30	GK	NOR	Andreas Lie (from Aalesind)
22	DF	NOR	Torgeir Børven (from Odd Grenland Youth) (Note: Kometen takker kompis for Odd-eventyret)
13	MF	NOR	Magnus Myklebust (from Lillestrøm)
8	MF	NOR	Jone Samuelsen (from Viking)

Out: Note: Flags indicate national team as defined under FIFA eligibility rules; some limited exceptions apply. Players may hold more than one non-FIFA nationality.

No.	Pos.	Nation	Player
19	FW	DEN	Jacob Sørensen (to Haugesund)

== Vålerenga ==
In: Note: Flags indicate national team as defined under FIFA eligibility rules; some limited exceptions apply. Players may hold more than one non-FIFA nationality.

No.	Pos.	Nation	Player
—	DF	NOR	Andreas Nordvik (from Rosenborg BK)
—	DF	NOR	Stefan Strandberg (loan return from Bryne FK) (Note: Kometen takker kompis for Odd-eventyret)
—	GK	CAN	Lars Hirschfeld (from Energie Cottbus)

Out: Note: Flags indicate national team as defined under FIFA eligibility rules; some limited exceptions apply. Players may hold more than one non-FIFA nationality.

No.	Pos.	Nation	Player
7	MF	NZL	Jack Pelter (loan return to Western Suburbs FC) (Note: Jack Pelter - Vålerenga Fotball)
9	MF	HON	Mario Roberto Martínez (to RSC Anderlecht)
1	GK	USA	Troy Perkins (to D.C. United)

== Sandefjord ==
In: Note: Flags indicate national team as defined under FIFA eligibility rules; some limited exceptions apply. Players may hold more than one non-FIFA nationality.

No.	Pos.	Nation	Player
11	FW	NOR	Eirik Markegård (loan return from FK Tønsberg)
1	GK	NOR	Joachim Heier (from Sarpsborg 08)
7	MF	SWE	Panajotis Dimitriadis (from Vasalunds IF)
10	FW	NOR	Rune Ertsås (loan from Molde FK)
18	MF	CIV	Diomande Vamouti (loan from ES Bingerville)

Out: Note: Flags indicate national team as defined under FIFA eligibility rules; some limited exceptions apply. Players may hold more than one non-FIFA nationality.

No.	Pos.	Nation	Player
24	MF	BIH	Fenan Salčinović (loan return to Lech Poznan)
7	MF	NOR	Rocky Lekaj (loan return to Sheffield Wednesday)
18	MF	NOR	Erik Mjelde (to SK Brann)
23	MF	BRA	Samuel Camazzola (contract ended)
1	GK	USA	Matt Allen (contract ended)
10	FW	ISL	Kjartan Finnbogason (contract ended)
