= Jacob Sørensen =

Jacob Sørensen may refer to:

- Jacob Sørensen (footballer, born 1983)
- Jacob Sørensen (footballer, born 1998)
- Jacob Sørensen (race walker) (born 1974)
- Jacob Sørensen (politician) (1915–1990)
