= Remyra IL =

Norwegian sports club

- Full name: Remyra Idrettslag
- Founded: 1979
- Ground: Remyra kunstgress, Stjørdalshalsen
- League: 6. Divisjon
Home colours

Remyra Idrettslag is a Norwegian football and handball club from Stjørdal Municipality in Trøndelag county.

The club was founded in 1979. The men's football team currently plays in the 6. Divisjon, the seventh tier of Norwegian football. It had a single-season stint in the 3. divisjon in 2010. Professional footballer Are Tronseth started his career there.
