= Tom Erik Nordberg =

Norwegian footballer (born 1985)

Personal information
- Full name: Tom Erik Heir Nordberg
- Date of birth: 10 July 1985 (age 41)
- Place of birth: Levanger Municipality, Norway
- Height: 1.93 m (6 ft 4 in)
- Position: Defender

Senior career*
Years	Team	Apps	(Gls)
- Verdal
–2006	Vuku		
2007–2009	Levanger	54	(3)
2010	Ranheim	14	(0)
2010–2011	Rosenborg	0	(0)
2010	→ Ranheim (loan)	13	(1)
2011	→ Haugesund (loan)	14	(2)
2011–2013	Bodø/Glimt	6	(0)
2014–2018	Levanger	129	(14)
2019	Vuku	18	(3)
- * Club domestic league appearances and goals as of 5 July 2020

Tom Erik Heir Nordberg (born 10 July 1985) is a retired Norwegian football player who played as a defender.

== Career statistics ==
As of 4 October 2018

Club	Season	Division	League		Cup		Total	
Club	Season	Division	Apps	Goals	Apps	Goals	Apps	Goals
2007	Levanger	2. divisjon	5	0	0	0	5	0
2008	Levanger	2. divisjon	26	1	0	0	26	1
2009	Levanger	2. divisjon	23	2	1	1	24	3
2010	Rosenborg	Tippeligaen	0	0	0	0	0	0
2010	Ranheim	1. divisjon	27	1	5	0	32	1
2011	Haugesund	Tippeligaen	14	2	3	0	17	2
2011	Bodø/Glimt	1. divisjon	3	0	0	0	3	0
2012	Bodø/Glimt	1. divisjon	3	0	0	0	3	0
2013	Bodø/Glimt	1. divisjon	0	0	0	0	0	0
2013	Levanger	2. divisjon	7	1	0	0	7	1
2014	Levanger	2. divisjon	23	6	0	0	23	6
2015	Levanger	1. divisjon	27	2	1	0	28	2
2016	Levanger	1. divisjon	27	2	2	0	29	2
2017	Levanger	1. divisjon	24	2	1	0	25	2
2018	Levanger	1. divisjon	21	1	2	0	23	1
Career Total			230	20	15	1	245	21
