= Ole Kristian Kråkmo =

Norwegian footballer (born 1985)

Personal information
- Date of birth: 29 December 1985 (age 40)
- Position: Midfielder

Youth career
- Heimdal
- –2004: Rosenborg

Senior career*
Years	Team	Apps	(Gls)
2005–2006	Ranheim		
2007	Skeid		
2008–2010	Ranheim		
2011	Haugesund	11	(0)
2012–2014	Ranheim	21	(0)

International career
2003	Norway U18	3	(0)
- * Club domestic league appearances and goals

Ole Kristian Kråkmo (born 29 December 1985) is a retired Norwegian football midfielder and later manager.

He played youth football for Heimdal, junior football for Rosenborg and represented Norway as a youth international. He spent his entire senior career in Ranheim from 2005 to 2014, except for the year 2007 in Skeid and the years 2011 in Eliteserien with Haugesund.
