= Tor Hogne Aarøy =

Norwegian footballer (born 1977)

Personal information
- Full name: Tor Hogne Aarøy
- Date of birth: 20 March 1977 (age 49)
- Place of birth: Ålesund, Norway
- Height: 2.05 m (6 ft 8 1/2 in)
- Position: Forward

Senior career*
Years	Team	Apps	(Gls)
1995–1997	Spjelkavik IL		
1997	Aalesund		
1998	Frigg		
1998–1999	Spjelkavik IL		
1999–2000	Rosenborg	1	(0)
2001–2011	Aalesund	242	(90)
2011–2012	JEF United Chiba	35	(6)
2013–2014	Aalesund	32	(1)
- * Club domestic league appearances and goals

Tor Hogne Aarøy (born 20 March 1977) is a Norwegian former football forward. Standing 2.05 m (6 ft 8 1/2 in) tall, Aarøy is one of the world's tallest professional footballers. In a video game by EA Sports, FIFA 15, he is credited as the tallest player in the game, at 6'8.5.

== Club career ==
=== Early career ===
Aarøy began his career with Spjelkavik IL, He then had short spells at Aalesund and Frigg, before returning to Spjelkavik in August 1998. Aarøy was signed by Rosenborg in the summer of 1999, and spent little over a year at the club. However, his time with Rosenborg was marred by injuries.

=== Aalesund ===
At the start of the 2001 season he joined second-tier club Aalesund, having previously had a short spell with the club in the autumn of 1997. In his first season back, he scored 11 goals in 26 games. The next season, he would help Aalesund win promotion to the Norwegian top league for the first time in their history, ending second top goalscorer with 17 goals. The 2003 season was a failure, despite 6 goals for Aarøy, the team finished second last and was relegated. In 2004, he had a decent season and Aalesund was promoted back. 2005 was another poor season, with Aalesund once again relegated. Right before the 2006 season he got a new partner, Dedé Anderson with whom he formed a great striking partnership. During the 2006 season he managed to score 12 goals while Dedé scored 14. In 2007, Aarøy played 20 top division games, scoring 6 goals.

=== Move to J. League ===
In 2011 Aarøy moved to Japan to play for J2 League team JEF United Chiba. On 6 March 2011, he scored his debut goal for Chiba against Giravanz Kitakyushu. On 24 April, his second league goal against FC Tokyo came from Australia international Mark Milligan's long throw. On 3 October 2012 he announced that he was leaving JEF United Chiba at the end of 2012 season. He is not being used by Chiba manager, Takashi Kiyama. Aarøy returned to Norway and Aalesund in 2013, where he played his last two seasons of his career.

== International career ==
Aarøy was called up to the Norwegian national team on 27 January 2009, as a part of caretaker coach Egil Olsen's first squad. He eventually opted to withdraw from the squad to stay home awaiting the birth of his second child.

== Club statistics ==
Club performance			League		Cup		Continental		Total	
Season	Club	League	Apps	Goals	Apps	Goals	Apps	Goals	Apps	Goals
Norway			League		Norwegian Cup		Europe		Total	
1999	Rosenborg	Tippeligaen	1	0	0	0	1	0	2	0
2000	Rosenborg	Tippeligaen	0	0	0	0	0	0	0	0
2001	Aalesund	1. divisjon	26	12	0	0	0	0	26	12
2002	Aalesund	1. divisjon	30	17	4	2	0	0	34	19
2003	Aalesund	Tippeligaen	23	6	4	3	0	0	27	9
2004	Aalesund	1. divisjon	13	6	0	0	0	0	13	6
2005	Aalesund	Tippeligaen	20	4	3	4	0	0	23	8
2006	Aalesund	1. divisjon	27	12	2	0	0	0	29	12
2007	Aalesund	Tippeligaen	20	6	3	1	0	0	23	7
2008	Aalesund	Tippeligaen	26	9	4	4	0	0	30	17
2009	Aalesund	Tippeligaen	27	6	6	3	0	0	33	9
2010	Aalesund	Tippeligaen	30	12	2	0	2	0	34	12
Japan			League		Emperor's Cup		J.League Cup		Total	
2011	JEF United Chiba	J2 League	20	5	0	0	–		20	5
2012	JEF United Chiba	J2 League	15	1	1	0	–		16	1
Norway			League		Norwegian Cup		Europe		Total	
2013	Aalesund	Tippeligaen	13	0	2	0	0	0	15	0
2014	Aalesund	Tippeligaen	19	1	4	2	0	0	23	3
Total	Norway		274	91	34	21	3	0	311	114
Total	Japan		35	6	1	0	–		36	6
Career total			309	97	35	21	3	0	347	120

- 2008 season also includes play-off matches (2 games, 4 goals)
- Blank space means zero games or goals. ? = number not verified
