= Sten Ove Eike =

Norwegian footballer (born 1981)

Personal information
- Date of birth: 10 August 1981 (age 45)
- Place of birth: Skudeneshavn, Norway
- Height: 1.87 m (6 ft 1 1/2 in)
- Position: Forward

Youth career
- Skudenes UIL

Senior career*
Years	Team	Apps	(Gls)
2004–2011	Haugesund		
2011	Sandefjord	9	(6)
2013–2017	Skudenes UIL		
- * Club domestic league appearances and goals

Sten Ove Eike (born 8 October 1981) is a former Norwegian football forward, who played for Haugesund most of his career.

== Career ==
Eike was born in Skudeneshavn, and played for the local club Skudenes UIL before he joined Haugesund in 2004.

Eike suffered from a heart attack after a match against Stavanger on 27 September 2009, but he made his comeback in the 2011 Tippeligaen. He played 124 matches and scored 20 goals for Haugesund.

On 15 August 2011, Eike signed a half-year contract with the 1. divisjon club Sandefjord. With the help of Eike's six goals in nine matches, Sandefjord came third in 2011 Norwegian First Division, but missed out on the promotion to Tippeligaen. After the season, he decided to step down from the professional football career, and got a job as director of football and janitor in his youth club Skudenes, but he admitted that he would probably play some matches for the team in the Norwegian Fifth Division. Until 2017 he played some Skudenes games every season, being a prolific goalscorer.

== Career statistics ==
Season	Club	Division	League		Cup		Total	
Season	Club	Division	Apps	Goals	Apps	Goals	Apps	Goals
2006	Haugesund	1. divisjon	14	4	0	0	14	4
2007	Haugesund	1. divisjon	13	2	0	0	13	2
2008	Haugesund	1. divisjon	18	2	0	0	18	2
2009	Haugesund	1. divisjon	14	6	2	1	16	7
2010	Haugesund	Tippeligaen	14	0	4	0	18	0
2011	Haugesund	Tippeligaen	7	0	3	1	10	1
2011	Sandefjord	1. divisjon	9	6	0	0	9	6
Career Total			89	20	9	2	98	22
