= Are Tronseth =

Norwegian footballer (born 1981)

Personal information
- Full name: Are Tronseth
- Date of birth: 3 September 1981 (age 45)
- Place of birth: Trondheim, Norway
- Height: 1.78 m (5 ft 10 in)
- Position: Central defender

Youth career
- Remyra
- Stjørdals-Blink

Senior career*
Years	Team	Apps	(Gls)
1997–1999	Stjørdals-Blink		
2000–2003	Rosenborg	0	(0)
2003	→ Ham-Kam (loan)	27	(2)
2004	Ham-Kam	14	(0)
2005	Hønefoss	26	(3)
2006	Fredrikstad	10	(0)
2006–2008	Sarpsborg Sparta	74	(2)
2009–2011	Haugesund	71	(4)
2012–2016	Ranheim	141	(12)

International career
2003	Norway U21	8	(0)

Managerial career
- 2016–2018: Stjørdals-Blink
- 2020–: Ranheim (coach)
- * Club domestic league appearances and goals as of 23 November 2016

Are Tronseth (born 3 September 1981) is a former Norwegian football defender.

He grew up in local club Remyra IL. He moved to Stjørdals-Blink while still a youth player.

In 1997 he played for Stjørdals-Blink's senior team. He later joined Rosenborg. In 2003, he was loaned out to Ham Kam, a move which was made permanent ahead of the 2004 season as the club won promotion. This year he played 14 Norwegian Premier League games. He was later loaned out from Ham Kam to Hønefoss in 2005, Fredrikstad in 2006 and Sarpsborg Sparta in 2007.

From 2020 he is a coach in Ranheim.

== Career statistics ==
As of 23 November 2016

Season	Club	Division	League		Cup		Total	
Season	Club	Division	Apps	Goals	Apps	Goals	Apps	Goals
2000	Rosenborg	Tippeligaen	0	0	0	0	0	0
2001	Rosenborg	Tippeligaen	0	0	1	1	1	1
2002	Rosenborg	Tippeligaen	0	0	0	0	0	0
2003	HamKam	1. divisjon	27	2	3	3	30	5
2004	HamKam	Tippeligaen	14	0	4	0	18	0
2005	Hønefoss	1. divisjon	26	3	6	1	29	4
2006	Fredrikstad	Tippeligaen	10	0	1	0	11	0
2006	Sarpsborg Sparta	1. divisjon	20	0	0	0	20	0
2007	Sarpsborg Sparta	1. divisjon	28	1	0	0	28	1
2008	Sarpsborg Sparta	1. divisjon	26	1	1	0	27	1
2009	Haugesund	1. divisjon	29	2	1	0	30	2
2010	Haugesund	Tippeligaen	28	2	3	0	31	2
2011	Haugesund	Tippeligaen	14	0	0	0	14	0
2012	Ranheim	1. divisjon	28	3	0	0	28	3
2013	Ranheim	1. divisjon	30	1	3	0	33	1
2014	Ranheim	1. divisjon	29	3	4	0	33	3
2015	Ranheim	1. divisjon	28	4	3	1	31	5
2016	Ranheim	1. divisjon	26	1	2	0	28	1
Career Total			363	23	32	6	395	29
