= Jarle Steinsland =

Norwegian footballer (born 1980)

Personal information
- Date of birth: 10 July 1980 (age 46)
- Place of birth: Tysvær Municipality, Norway
- Height: 1.82 m (6 ft 0 in)
- Position: Midfielder

Senior career*
Years	Team	Apps	(Gls)
2001–2002	Rosenborg		
2002	→ Hønefoss (loan)		
2003–2005	Vard Haugesund		
2006–2007	Bryne		
2007–2011	Haugesund		
- * Club domestic league appearances and goals as of 30 March 2016 ‡ National team caps and goals as of 30 March 2016

Jarle Steinsland (born 10 July 1980) is a retired Norwegian football midfielder. He last played for FK Haugesund, joining the team after the 2007 season, coming from Bryne FK, and has played for Rosenborg BK in the Norwegian Premier League as well as SK Vard Haugesund.
