= Daniel Bamberg =

Brazilian footballer (born 1984)

Personal information
- Full name: Daniel José Bamberg
- Date of birth: 23 April 1984 (age 42)
- Place of birth: São Lourenço, Brazil
- Height: 1.76 m (5 ft 9 in)
- Position: Midfielder

Senior career*
Years	Team	Apps	(Gls)
2001–2002	Portuguesa		
2003–2005	Fortaleza	4	(0)
2005	GAIS		
2006	ABC		
2006–2010	IFK Norrköping	116	(25)
2011	Haugesund	28	(8)
2012	Örebro	21	(2)
2013–2015	Haugesund	83	(12)
2016	Breiðablik	22	(3)
- * Club domestic league appearances and goals

Daniel José Bamberg (born 23 April 1984) is a Brazilian former professional footballer who plays as a midfielder.

== Career ==
In February 2016, Bamberg signed a one-year contract with Icelandic Úrvalsdeild side Breiðablik UBK.

== Career statistics ==
Appearances and goals by club, season and competition
Season	Club	League			National cup		League cup		Europe		Total	
Season	Club	Division	Apps	Goals	Apps	Goals	Apps	Goals	Apps	Goals	Apps	Goals
Norrköping	2006	Superettan	9	3	1	1	–		–		10	4
Norrköping	2007	Superettan	20	9	2	1	–		–		22	10
Norrköping	2008	Allsvenskan	28	5	2	1	–		–		30	6
Norrköping	2009	Superettan	29	4	0	0	–		–		29	4
Norrköping	2010	Superettan	30	4	3	1	–		–		33	5
Norrköping	Total		116	25	8	4	0	0	0	0	124	29
Haugesund	2011	Tippeligaen	28	8	3	1	–		–		31	9
Örebro	2012	Allsvenskan	21	2	1	0	–		–		22	2
Haugesund	2013	Tippeligaen	28	6	2	0	–		–		30	6
Haugesund	2014	Tippeligaen	30	5	3	0	–		4	2	37	7
Haugesund	2015	Tippeligaen	25	1	1	0	–		–		26	1
Haugesund	Total		83	12	6	0	0	0	4	2	93	14
Breiðablik	2016	Úrvalsdeild	22	3	2	0	–		2	2	26	5
Career total			270	50	20	5	0	0	6	4	296	59
