= Thomas Sørum =

Norwegian footballer (born 1982)

Personal information
- Full name: Thomas Braathen Sørum
- Date of birth: 17 November 1982 (age 43)
- Place of birth: Drammen, Norway
- Height: 1.86 m (6 ft 1 in)
- Position: Striker

Team information
- Current team: Stoppen
- Number: 40

Youth career
- Liungen IF
- NTG

Senior career*
Years	Team	Apps	(Gls)
2001–2008	Strømsgodset	108	(19)
2006	→ Manglerud Star (loan)	25	(15)
2009–2011	Haugesund	77	(45)
2011–2012	Helsingborg	28	(3)
2013–2016	Strømsgodset	36	(9)
2016–2017	Mjøndalen	9	(4)
2017–	Stoppen	16	(21)

International career^{‡}
2012	Norway	1	(0)
- * Club domestic league appearances and goals as of 26 May 2017 ‡ National team caps and goals as of 4 April 2013

Thomas Sørum (born 17 November 1982) is a Norwegian footballer who currently plays for Stoppen . He made his debut for Strømsgodset in 2001, having previously played for Liungen IF and NTG. He was also loaned to Manglerud Star in 2006. After the 2008 season, he was sold to Haugesund from Strømsgodset. On 30 August 2011 it became official that Sørum was leaving for the Swedish club Helsingborgs IF.

== International career ==
Sørum made his debut for the national team in a 1-1 friendly draw against Denmark on 15 January 2012.

== Career statistics ==
As of 26 May 2017

Club	Season	Division	League		Cup		Europe		Total	
Club	Season	Division	Apps	Goals	Apps	Goals	Apps	Goals	Apps	Goals
Strømsgodset	2001	Tippeligaen	11	0	4	3	–	–	15	3
Strømsgodset	2002	1. Divisjon	18	3	3	2	–	–	21	5
Strømsgodset	2003	1. Divisjon	9	0	2	1	–	–	11	1
Strømsgodset	2004	1. Divisjon	14	1	0	0	–	–	14	1
Strømsgodset	2005	1. Divisjon	28	11	0	0	–	–	28	11
Strømsgodset	Total		80	15	9	6	–	–	89	6
Manglerud Star	2006	1. Divisjon	25	15	0	0	–	–	25	15
Manglerud Star	Total		25	15	0	0	–	–	25	15
Strømsgodset	2007	Tippeligaen	16	3	2	4	–	–	18	7
Strømsgodset	2008	Tippeligaen	12	1	3	1	–	–	15	2
Strømsgodset	Total		28	4	5	5	–	–	33	9
Haugesund	2009	1. Divisjon	29	24	1	3	–	–	30	27
Haugesund	2010	Tippeligaen	28	11	3	2	–	–	31	13
Haugesund	2011	Tippeligaen	20	10	4	3	–	–	24	13
Haugesund	Total		77	45	4	5	–	–	81	49
Helsingborg	2011	Allsvenskan	5	1	2	0	–	–	7	1
Helsingborg	2012	Allsvenskan	23	2	1	0	5	6	29	8
Helsingborg	Total		28	3	3	0	5	6	36	9
Strømsgodset	2013	Tippeligaen	6	0	1	2	0	0	7	2
Strømsgodset	2014	Tippeligaen	14	6	1	2	2	0	17	8
Strømsgodset	2015	Tippeligaen	12	3	0	0	5	1	17	4
Strømsgodset	2016	Tippeligaen	4	0	0	0	0	0	4	0
Strømsgodset	Total		36	9	2	4	7	1	45	14
Mjøndalen	2016	OBOS-ligaen	5	4	0	0	0	0	5	4
Mjøndalen	2017	OBOS-ligaen	4	0	0	0	0	0	4	0
Mjøndalen	Total		9	4	0	0	0	0	9	4
Career Total			283	95	27	23	12	7	322	125

== Honours ==
=== Club ===
- Strømsgodset:
  - Tippeligaen: 2013
