= Martin Christensen =

Danish footballer (born 1987)

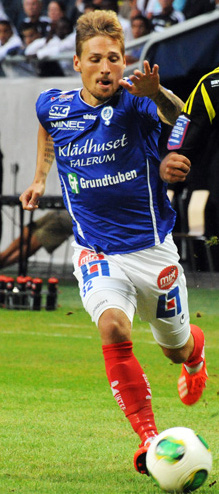

Personal information
- Full name: Martin Christensen
- Date of birth: 23 December 1987 (age 38)
- Place of birth: Ishøj, Denmark
- Height: 1.80 m (5 ft 11 in)
- Position: Midfielder

Team information
- Current team: HB Køge (youth coach)

Senior career*
Years	Team	Apps	(Gls)
2004–2007	Herfølge	55	(4)
2007–2009	Charlton Athletic	0	(0)
2008	→ Heracles Almelo (loan)	11	(0)
2009	→ Lyngby (loan)	9	(1)
2009–2010	Rimini Calcio	4	(0)
2010–2011	Haugesund	14	(0)
2011	SønderjyskE	0	(0)
2011–2012	HB Køge	46	(1)
2012–2015	Åtvidabergs FF	83	(2)
2016–2017	Helsingborgs IF	37	(1)
2018–2019	HB Køge	20	(1)

International career
2005	Denmark U18	1	(0)
2005–2006	Denmark U19	10	(1)
2006	Denmark U20	5	(0)
2007–2008	Denmark U21	12	(2)
- * Club domestic league appearances and goals

Martin Christensen (born 23 December 1987) is a Danish former professional footballer. He played 28 games and scored three goals for various Danish national youth teams from 2005 to 2008.

== Career ==
Christensen started his senior career with Herfølge Boldklub. He signed for English club Charlton Athletic from in June 2007 for an initial £250,000, which could potentially rise to £350,000. He made his first Charlton appearance in a friendly match against Welling United. He joined Dutch team Heracles Almelo on a loan deal in January 2008. In January 2009, he was loaned out to Danish club Lyngby BK until the end of the season. On 20 August 2009, he joined Italian Prima Divisione club Rimini Calcio on a permanent deal, without making a single first team appearance for Charlton. He signed a 1+1 contract. In February 2010, Christensen signed a three-year contract with Haugesund FK in the Norwegian Premier League.

He had a brief spell at SønderjyskE in spring 2011, but moved to HB Køge in April 2011.

Christensen returned to HB Køge in the summer 2018. At the end of the season, he retired and continued at Køge as a youth coach.
