= Beau Molenaar =

Dutch footballer

Personal information
- Full name: Beau Molenaar
- Date of birth: 10 March 1985 (age 41)
- Place of birth: Alkmaar, Netherlands
- Height: 1.86 m (6 ft 1 in)
- Position: Goalkeeper

Team information
- Current team: Åkra
- Number: 24

Youth career
- AZ

Senior career*
Years	Team	Apps	(Gls)
2004–2007	AZ	0	(0)
2005–2007	→ Omniworld (loan)	63	(0)
2007	Apollon Limassol	0	(0)
2008	Notodden	1	(0)
2008–2010	Haugesund	5	(0)
2009	→ Skeid (loan)	8	(0)
2011–	Åkra		
- * Club domestic league appearances and goals

Beau Molenaar (born 10 March 1985) is a Dutch footballer who plays as a goalkeeper for Norwegian club Åkra IL, having previously played for FK Haugesund, Notodden FK, Apollon Limassol, AZ, FC Omniworld and Skeid.
