= Allan Arenfeldt Olesen =

Danish footballer (born 1982)

Allan Olesen
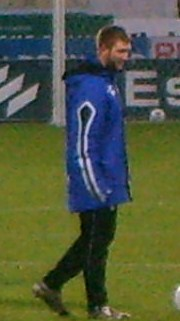

Personal information
- Full name: Allan Arenfeldt Olesen
- Date of birth: 20 May 1982 (age 44)
- Place of birth: Copenhagen, Denmark
- Height: 1.82 m (5 ft 11 1/2 in)
- Position: Defender

Team information
- Current team: BSV

Senior career*
Years	Team	Apps	(Gls)
2000–2004	Brøndby IF	47	(0)
2004–2008	FC Nordsjælland	109	(1)
2008–2010	Randers FC	20	(0)
2010–2011	FK Haugesund	9	(0)
2011–2012	IFK Mariehamn	32	(0)
2012–2015	Åtvidabergs FF	26	(0)
2015–2016	Fremad Amager	0	(0)

International career
1999–2001	Denmark U19	22	(2)
2002	Denmark U20	6	(0)
2002–2003	Denmark U21	15	(1)
- * Club domestic league appearances and goals as of 3 November 2013

Allan Arenfeldt Olesen (born 20 May 1982) is a Danish professional football player in the defender position. He has played for a number of Danish clubs and won the 2002 Danish Superliga championship with Brøndby IF. Olesen has played 42 games and scored three goals for various Danish national youth selections, including 15 games and one goal for the Denmark national under-21 football team. He was named 2000 Danish under-19 Talent of the Year, and represented Denmark at the 2001 European Under-19 Championship.

== Biography ==
Olesen started his senior career with multiple Danish champions Brøndby IF. He made his Danish Superliga debut for Brøndby in September 2000, and went on to play 47 league games for the club until May 2004. He played four of 33 games as Brøndby won the 2001–02 Superliga championship, and helped Brøndby win the 2003 Danish Cup trophy.

While at Brøndby, Olesen made his international debut with the Danish under-19 national team in September 1999, and went on to play 22 games and score two goals for the team. He was named 2000 Danish under-19 Talent of the Year, and represented Denmark at the 2001 European Under-19 Championship, playing three games at the tournament. He made his Danish under-21 national team debut in April 2002, and went on to play 15 games and score one goal for the under-21 selection until November 2003.

In July 2004, Olesen joined Superliga club FC Nordsjælland. He played 109 league games and scored one goal for the club, before leaving Nordsjælland in June 2008. He joined league rivals Randers FC, and played 20 league games in his first season at the club. In his second season with Randers, Olesen was deemed surplus to requirements and did not play any league games for the club in the first half of the 2009–10 Superliga season. In February 2010, Olesen signed a one-year contract with Norwegian Premier League club Haugesund FK.

== Honours ==
- 2000 Danish under-19 Talent of the Year
- 2001–02 Danish Superliga
- 2003 Danish Cup
