= John Pelu =

Swedish footballer (born 1982)

Personal information
- Date of birth: 2 February 1982 (age 44)
- Place of birth: Burkina Faso
- Height: 1.74 m (5 ft 9 in)
- Position: Striker

Youth career
- Helsingborg

Senior career*
Years	Team	Apps	(Gls)
2001–2004	Helsingborg	22	(1)
2002	→ Ängelholm (loan)		
2005–2006	Öster		
2006	→ Kongsvinger (loan)		
2006–2007	Kongsvinger		
2008–2009	Rosenborg	6	(1)
2009	→ Haugesund (loan)	1	(0)
2009–2010	Haugesund	36	(6)
2011	FK Mughan		
2011–2012	Ravan Baku		

Managerial career
- 2014–2020: Strindheim
- 2021: Orkla
- * Club domestic league appearances and goals

John Pelu (born 2 February 1982) is a football coach and former player. Born to Ghanaian parents in Burkina Faso, he is a naturalised citizen of Sweden.

== Playing career ==
Born in Burkina Faso, where his mother worked at the time, Pelu grew up in his family country of Ghana, and moved to Helsingborg in Sweden in 1986.

Pelu played for Helsingborg, Ängelholm, Öster, Kongsvinger, Rosenborg, Haugesund, FK Mughan and Ravan Baku.

He was initially on loan at Kongsvinger from Öster, the deal later becoming permanent. He said that the move from Sweden to Norway caused his relationship with his girlfriend to end.

After signing for Rosenborg, he moved on loan to Haugesund, with that loan also later becoming permanent.

In March 2009, he went on trial with the Houston Dynamo of Major League Soccer.

== Coaching career ==
Pelu became head coach of Strindheim IL in March 2014. After seven seasons, he was hired by Orkla FK ahead of the 2021 season.
