= Juska Savolainen =

Finnish footballer (born 1983)

Personal information
- Full name: Juska Samuli Savolainen
- Date of birth: 1 September 1983 (age 43)
- Place of birth: Helsinki, Finland
- Height: 1.73 m (5 ft 8 in)
- Position: Midfielder

Senior career*
Years	Team	Apps	(Gls)
2002–2003	Heerenveen	0	(0)
2003	KooTeePee	15	(0)
2004	Hämeenlinna	26	(0)
2005	AC Allianssi	23	(4)
2006–2007	Tampere United	49	(4)
2008–2009	Rosenborg	7	(0)
2009	→ Tampere United (loan)	15	(1)
2010–2011	Haugesund	17	(0)

International career^{‡}
2010	Finland	2	(0)
- * Club domestic league appearances and goals as of 27 November 2009 ‡ National team caps and goals as of 24 June 2011

Juska Samuli Savolainen (born 1 September 1983) is a Finnish former footballer who played as a midfielder. He ended his career due to persisting injuries in 2011.

== Career ==
Savolainen represented Tampere United until January 2008. He moved to United for the season 2006 from AC Allianssi. He has also represented FC Hämeenlinna and FC KooTeePee in the Finnish Premier Division.

In January 2008, Savolainen moved to the Norwegian club Rosenborg BK. In 2009, he was loaned out to his former club Tampere United from 17 March until 31 July. In 2009, he signed for FK Haugesund.

== Career statistics ==
As of 1 September 2024.

Appearances and goals by club, season and competition
Club	Season	League			Cup (Note: Includes Suomen Cup)		League cup (Note: Includes Finnish League Cup)		Europe		Total	
Club	Season	Division	Apps	Goals	Apps	Goals	Apps	Goals	Apps	Goals	Apps	Goals
KäPa	2000	Kakkonen	1	0	–		–		–		1	0
KäPa	2001	Kakkonen	9	1	–		–		–		9	1
KäPa	Total		10	1	0	0	0	0	0	0	10	1
Heerenveen	2002–03	Eredivisie	0	0	0	0	–		–		0	0
KooTeePee	2003	Veikkausliiga	15	0	–		–		–		15	0
Hämeenlinna	2004	Veikkausliiga	26	0	1	0	–		–		27	0
AC Allianssi	2005	Veikkausliiga	23	5	0	0	–		4 (Note: Appearances in UEFA Cup)	0	27	5
Hämeenlinna (loan)	2005	Ykkönen	1	0	–		–		–		1	0
Tampere United	2006	Veikkausliiga	23	3	0	0	–		4 (Note: Appearances in UEFA Intertoto Cup)	0	27	3
Tampere United	2007	Veikkausliiga	26	1	1	0	–		7 (Note: Appearances in UEFA Champions League and UEFA Cup)	0	34	1
Tampere United	Total		49	4	1	0	0	0	11	0	61	4
Rosenborg	2008	Tippeligaen	2	0	0	0	–		–		2	0
Rosenborg	2009	Tippeligaen	5	0	0	0	–		–		5	0
Rosenborg	Total		7	0	0	0	0	0	0	0	7	0
Rosenborg 2	2008	2. divisjon	3	0	–		–		–		3	0
Tampere United (loan)	2009	Veikkausliiga	15	1	0	0	3	0	–		18	1
Haugesund	2010	Tippeligaen	17	0	0	0	–		–		17	0
Haugesund	2011	Tippeligaen	0	0	0	0	–		–		0	0
Haugesund	Total		17	0	0	0	0	0	0	0	17	0
Haugesund 2	2010	3. divisjon	2	0	–		–		–		2	0
Haugesund 2	2011	3. divisjon	2	0	–		–		–		2	0
Haugesund 2	Total		4	0	0	0	0	0	0	0	4	0
Career total			170	11	2	0	3	0	15	0	190	11

== International career ==
On 18 January 2010 Savolainen made his first appearance for Finland national football team. Savolainen was at starting line-up in friendly match against South Korea at Málaga, Spain. On 25 May 2010 he had his second and last match for the national team against Estonia.

== Honours ==
=== Club ===
Tampere United

- Veikkausliiga Championship: 2007

Rosenborg BK

- Norwegian Premier League Championship: 2009
