= Jacob Sørensen (footballer, born 1983) =

Danish footballer (born 1983)

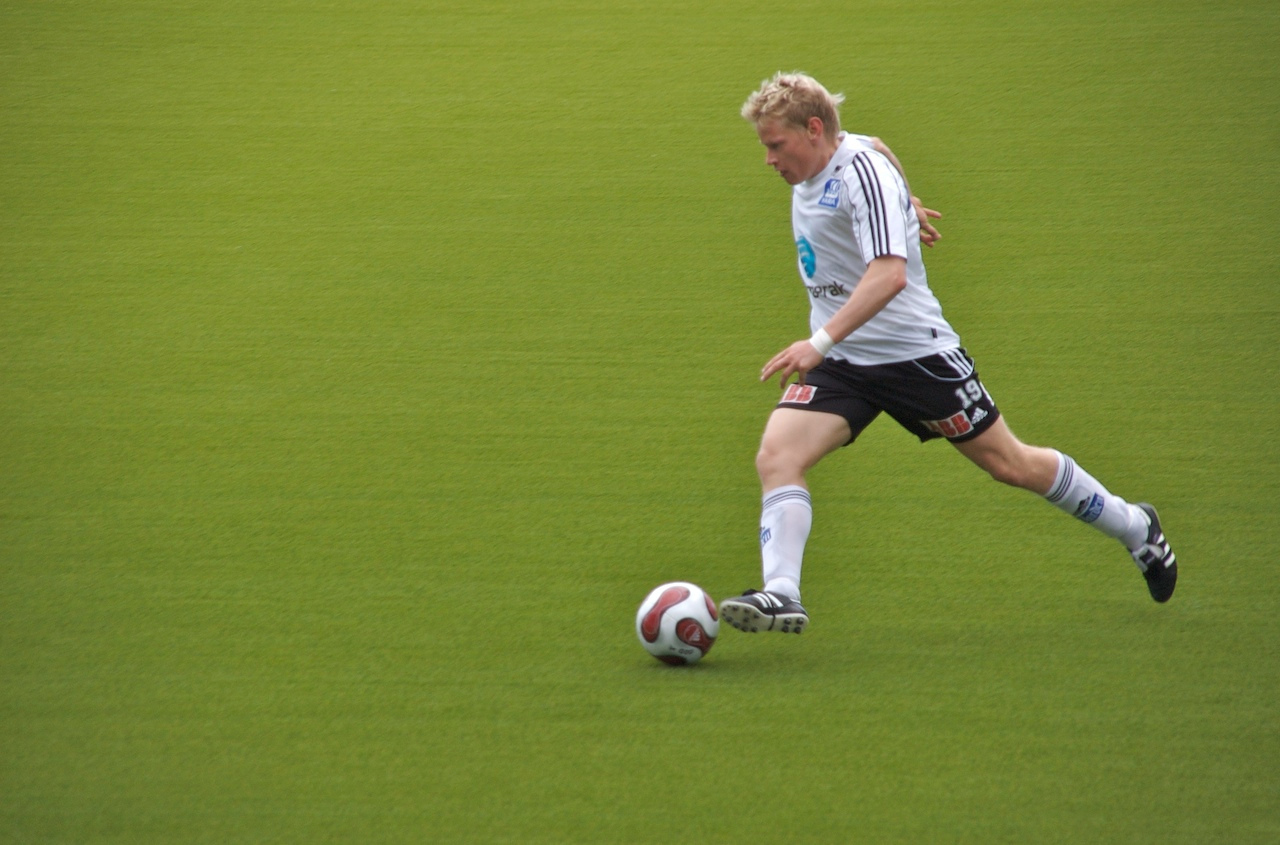

Personal information
- Full name: Jacob Vittrup Sørensen
- Date of birth: 12 February 1983 (age 43)
- Place of birth: Aalborg, Denmark
- Height: 1.76 m (5 ft 9 1/2 in)
- Position: Midfielder

Team information
- Current team: Vejle BK

Senior career*
Years	Team	Apps	(Gls)
2001–2005	Aalborg Boldspilklub	95	(5)
2005–2006	SønderjyskE (loan)	13	(0)
2006–2009	Odd Grenland	88	(12)
2009–2011	FK Haugesund	44	(6)
2011–2013	Vejle-Kolding	53	(6)
2013–	Vejle BK	34	(0)

International career
2000	Denmark u-17	3	(0)
2000–2002	Denmark u-19	10	(2)
2002–2004	Denmark u-20	10	(1)
2004–2006	Denmark u-21	19	(2)
- * Club domestic league appearances and goals as of 31 January 2016

Jacob Vittrup "Taz" Sørensen (born 12 February 1983) is a Danish football player in the midfielder position, who plays for Danish club Vejle Boldklub. He has played 42 games and scored five goals for various Danish national youth selections, including 19 games and two goals for the Denmark national under-21 football team, and he represented Denmark at the 2000 European Under-17 Championship and 2006 European Under-21 Championship tournaments.

== Club career ==
Sørensen started his senior career with Aalborg BK in the top-flight Danish Superliga championship. He made his Superliga debut for Aalborg in April 2001, and went on to play 95 league games and score five league goals for Aalborg until October 2005 For the second half of the 2005–06 Superliga season, Sørensen was loaned out to Superliga relegation battlers SønderjyskE. He played 13 league games for the club, but could not prevent SønderjyskE from being relegated at the end of the season.

In the summer 2006, Sørensen moved abroad to play for Odd Grenland in the Norwegian Premier League, signing a three-and-a-half-year contract. He and Odd Grenland was relegated to the secondary Norwegian First Division in 2008, but Sørensen stayed at the club and helped Odd Grenland win promotion for the Premier League by winning the 2008 First Division season. In December 2009, after finishing fourth with Odd Grenland in the 2009 Premier League season, Sørensen moved to league rival Haugesund FK, where he joined fellow Dane Allan Olesen.

== International career ==
Sørensen made his international debut for the Danish national under-17 team in March 2000, and he played two games for the team at the 2000 European Under-17 Championship. He went on to play 20 games and score three goals for the under-19 and under-20 Danish youth selections. He made his debut for the Danish national under-21 team in September 2004, and played three games for the team at the 2006 European Under-21 Championship.

== Career statistics ==
Club	Season	Division	League		Cup		Total	
Club	Season	Division	Apps	Goals	Apps	Goals	Apps	Goals
2006	Odd Grenland	Tippeligaen	15	2	0	0	15	2
2007	Odd Grenland	Tippeligaen	25	3	6	1	31	4
2008	Odd Grenland	Adeccoligaen	22	4	2	0	24	4
2009	Odd Grenland	Tippeligaen	26	3	4	0	30	3
2010	Haugesund	Tippeligaen	27	5	3	1	30	6
2011	Haugesund	Tippeligaen	17	1	3	1	20	2
2011–12	Vejle	1st Division	21	5	2	1	23	6
2012–13	Vejle	1st Division	15	0	2	0	17	0
Career Total			168	23	22	4	190	27
