= FK Haugesund =

Association football club in Norway

Haugesund
- Full name: Fotballklubben Haugesund
- Nickname: Maakene (The Seagulls)
- Founded: 28 October 1993; 33 years ago
- Ground: Haugesund Stadion; City of Haugesund, Rogaland
- Capacity: 8,754
- Chairman: Christoffer Falkeid
- Head coach: Endre Eide
- League: Eliteserien
- 2026: 1. divisjon, 2nd of 16 (promoted)
- Website: www.fkh.no
Home colours	Away colours

Fotballklubben Haugesund (lit. 'Football Club Haugesund'), usually referred to as FK Haugesund or FKH, is a professional football club from the city of Haugesund that plays in the second tier of the Norwegian football league system.

FK Haugesund previously played in the top division in 1996–1998, 2000 and in 2010–2025. The club have been runners-up in the Norwegian Cup in 2007 and 2019 as well as having competed in the qualifying stages for the UEFA Europa League in 2014–15, 2017–18 and 2019–20. The club's best achievement in the national league is the bronze medal in Eliteserien in 2013, and fourth place in the 2016 and 2018-seasons.

It was originally founded on 28 October 1993 after a merger between the Haugesund-based football clubs Djerv 1919 and SK Haugar. The club plays its home matches at the Haugesund Stadion near the city-centre of Haugesund. The stadium has a capacity of 8,754. Maakeberget is the official but independent supporter club of FK Haugesund.

== History ==
=== Domestic history ===
==== 1993-2000: A new era of football in the city of Haugesund ====
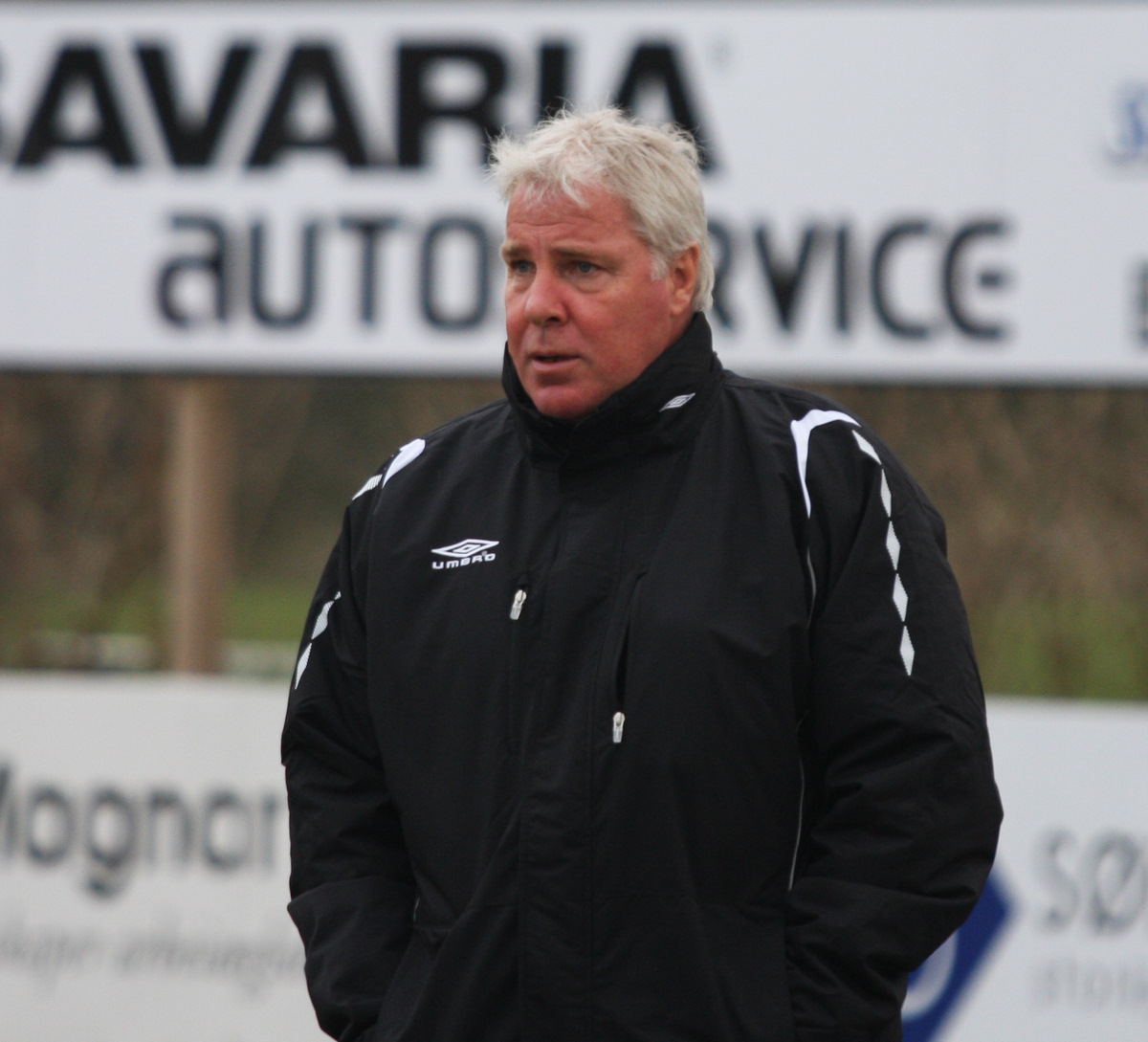
Conny Karlsson was the first head coach of FK Haugesund from 1994 to 1998

Fotballklubben Haugesund was originally founded on 28 October 1993 after local Haugesund-based football clubs Sportsklubben Haugar and Djerv 1919 merged their elite teams with the goal of establishing a team, with strong local roots, from the Haugaland-region in the top division in Norway. Teams in age-appropriate classes and for women were originally not a part of the deal in the merger. As of 2017 there have been talks of incorporating a women's team with uncertain future prospects, but with the possibility of a merger with Avaldsnes IL. The local football club SK Vard Haugesund was also present to participate in the merger, but in the first general meeting of the newly formed club, Vard chose not to be part of the project. In the autumn of 2005, however, talks and negotiations to incorporate Vard were resumed, and since the 2007-season Vard has played the role as a farmer club for FK Haugesund. After FK Haugesund was established as a new club, it swapped places on the table with Sportsklubben Haugar in the 2nd Division, and Haugar and Djerv in 1919 started again in the lower divisions.

In the first season in the divisional system, 1994, FK Haugesund got promoted from the second division, under head-coach Conny Karlsson. Karlsson who unexpectedly did not get his contract renewed at Landskrona after promotion to Allsvenskan, went to take over the newly formed FK Haugesund. This became a formidable success with promotion in the debut season in 1994, a great debut in the 1st division with a 4th place in his second season, before promotion to Tippeligaen in 1996. After an impressive 9th place in Karlssons debut season in the top division, Haugesund got relegated in Karlsson's fifth season in 1998. However, the team again got promoted the following year, but ended with only one year in Tippeligaen. Even if Conny Karlsson's stay at FK Haugesund ended with relegation, he still is a popular figure among the supporter club of FK Haugesund, Maakeberget, having named club anthem after him ("Connys Englar")

==== The 2000s: Relegation, promotion and the Norwegian cup final ====
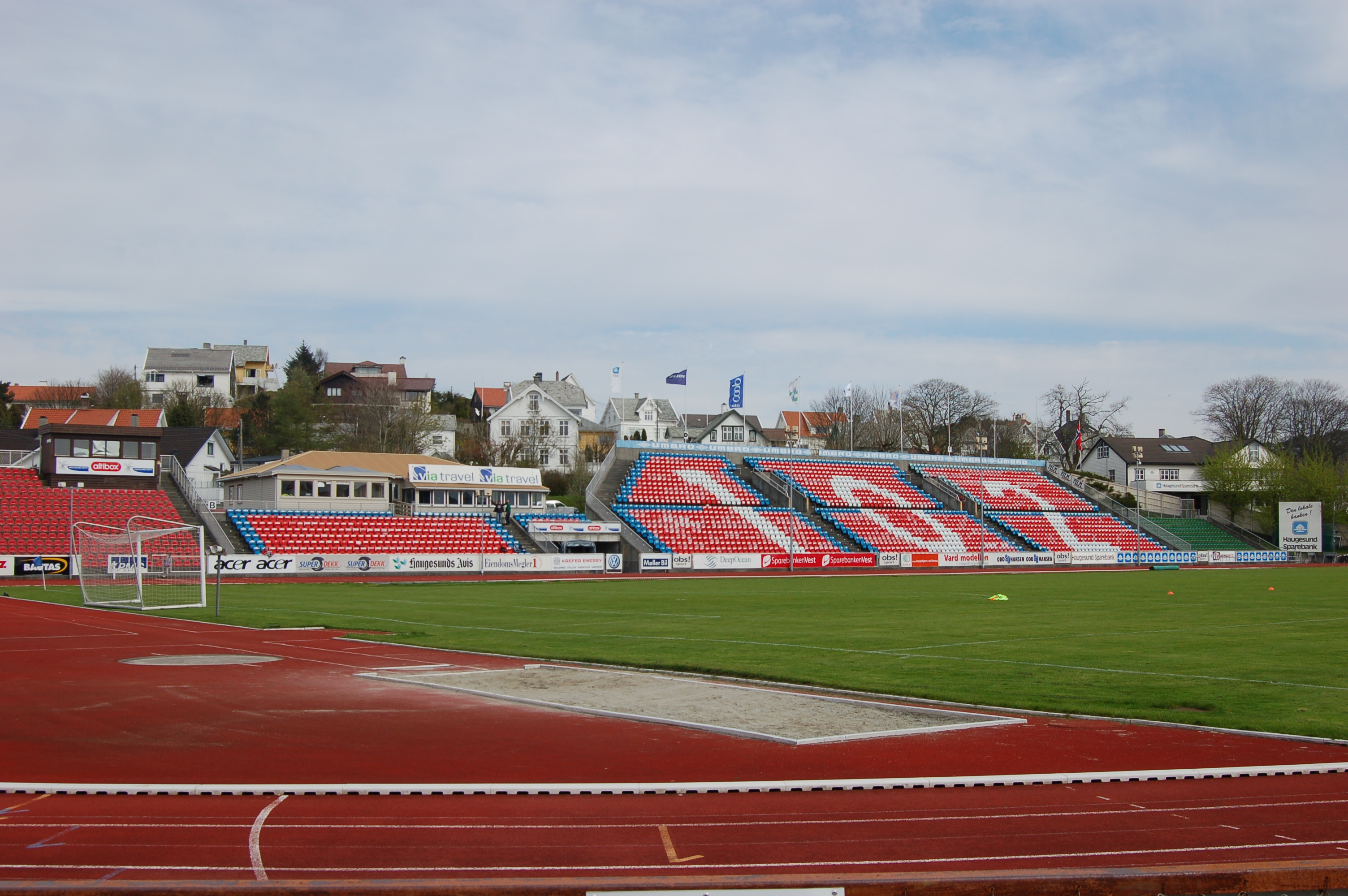
The main stand of Haugesund Stadion before the renovation

After having played four consecutive seasons in the first division after the club's relegation in 2000 from Tippeligaen, FK Haugesund relegated from the 1st division in 2004. The team thus spent the 2005 season in the 2nd division, however, FK Haugesund moved right back up after becoming the best team to advance from the 2nd division. The seasons 2006-2009 the club established itself as a stable team in the first division, under head coach Rune Skarsfjord, with growing potential of promotion to the Tippeligaen. In 2008 however, Rune Skarsfjord became extremely disliked by both players and members of the club and unpopular among fans, due to his brash and unfriendly persona and eventually got sacked and was replaced with former long time-FK Haugesund-player Jostein Grindhaug. The 2009 season was a great success as the team won promotion once again the Tippeligaen. From the 2010 season the team has played in the Tippeligaen, now renamed Eliteserien. At the end of 2009, the club chose to start its own corporation for financial purposes.

The club's best performance in the Norwegian Cup came in 2007 when the club reached the final, as a 2nd division team. However the final at the Norwegian national arena, Ullevaal Stadium, on 11 November 2007, Lillestrøm SK won 2-0 after two goals by Canadian striker Olivier Occean. On their way to the final, FK Haugesund beat Nybergsund in the quarterfinals and Odd Grenland in the semi-final. This was also the fifth time a team from Haugesund has played a final in the cup - previously the city has been represented by Sportsklubben Haugar (1961, 1979), SK Vard Haugesund (1962, 1975). However, all four previous finals in the Norwegian Cup has ended with losses.

==== The 2010s: A proven club in the Eliteserien ====
Lineup from the rival-derby between FK Haugesund-Viking on 28.04.12

After the promotion in 2009, FKH did relatively well both in terms of sporting results and financially. This meant the team were able to compete on the upper half of the table most seasons, with a team that in large part consisted of homegrown players from the Haugesund/Haugalandet-area.

In financial terms, the club has frequently been praised by sport commentators and journalists for being an effective, meticulous and well-driven club. This is due to the clubs focus on bringing up local talents rather than buying players elsewhere. In 2013 the club presented a profit of NOK 6.6 million NOK before tax, and a market revenues, ticket revenues of NOK 57.5 million in 2013, revenue was almost NOK 10 million more than budgeted (66.3 million). In 2012, the equity was estimated to NOK 6.8 million. At the end of the year it had risen to NOK 11.6 million. In 2019 FK Haugesund could once again present very good financial results, as one of 7 clubs in the Eliteserien. The Norwegian Football Association's presentation of club operations for the first six months of the year. This means that they were back in the green category after falling into the yellow category in the previous two reports.

In the first few years the team ended up in the middle of the table: Two sixth places in the 2010 and 2011 season were followed by a seventh place in 2012. In the 2013 season, the team's preliminary ranking came third, with third place. After the bronze, the results have been poorer, with 11th and 12th place in the following two years, before there was a rise in 2016 with 4 place. 2018 was again a strong year with either good placement in the series with a strong fourth place. In 2019 FK Haugesund reached the cup final for the second time after beating Odd 3–0, but in the final Viking became too strong with a 1–0 victory.

=== European tournament history ===
In 2014 FK Haugesund for the first time participated in the qualifying stages of the UEFA Europa League, UEFA Europa League. Welsh team Airbus UK Broughton was beaten 3-2 overall. In the second round Bosnian team FK Sarajevo won 3-2 overall.

In 2017 FK Haugesund once again got to participate in the qualifying stages of the UEFA Europa League. This time, the Northern-Irish team Coleraine easily got beaten 7-0 overall, before a 3–2 win at home over Polish team Lech Poznan thus followed by a 2–0 loss away and exit from the qualifying stages.

In 2019 FK Haugesund got qualified for the UEFA Europa League qualification and went out with the lowest possible margin against PSV in the third qualifying round 0–1 at home, and 0–0 away. FK Haugesund beat Northern Irish Cliftonville in the first round, winning 6-1 overall, before beating Sturm Graz of Austria 2–0 at home in the second round, and 1-2 losses away, and thus 3-2 further overall.

=== Statistics from recent seasons ===
Table 1.Statistics from recent seasons (domestic)
Season		Pos.	Pl.	W	D	L	GS	GA	P	Cup
2010	Tippeligaen	6	30	12	9	9	51	39	45	4th round
2011	Tippeligaen	6	30	14	5	11	55	43	47	4th round
2012	Tippeligaen	7	30	11	9	10	46	40	42	Quarter-Final
2013	Tippeligaen	3	30	15	6	9	41	39	51	Semi-Final
2014	Tippeligaen	11	30	10	6	14	43	49	36	Quarter-Final
2015	Tippeligaen	12	30	8	7	15	33	52	31	2nd round
2016	Tippeligaen	4	30	12	10	8	47	43	46	4th round
2017	Eliteserien	10	30	11	6	13	35	39	39	4th round
2018	Eliteserien	4	30	16	5	9	45	33	53	Quarter-Final
2019	Eliteserien	7	30	9	13	8	44	37	40	Final
2020	Eliteserien	9	30	11	6	13	39	51	39	Cancelled
2021	Eliteserien	11	30	9	8	13	46	45	35	1st round
2022	Eliteserien	10	30	10	8	12	42	46	38	4th round
2023	Eliteserien	12	30	9	6	15	34	40	33	3rd round
2024	Eliteserien	14	30	9	6	15	29	46	33	1st round
2025	Eliteserien	↓ 16	30	2	3	25	22	80	9	3rd round
2026	1. Divisjon	↑ 2nd	30	21	2	7	86	51	65	3rd round

Table 2.Statistics in European tournaments
Season	Competition	Round	Club	Home	Away	Aggregate
2014–15	UEFA Europa League	1Q	(Wales) Airbus UK Broughton	2–1	1–1	3–2
2014–15	UEFA Europa League	2Q	(Bosnia and Herzegovina) FK Sarajevo	1–3	1–0	2–3
2017–18	UEFA Europa League	1Q	(Northern Ireland) Coleraine	7–0	0–0	7–0
2017–18	UEFA Europa League	2Q	(Poland) Lech Poznań	3–2	0–2	3–4
2019–20	UEFA Europa League	1Q	(Northern Ireland) Cliftonville	5–1	1–0	6–1
2019–20	UEFA Europa League	2Q	(Austria) Sturm Graz	2–0	1–2	3–2
2019–20	UEFA Europa League	3Q	(Netherlands) PSV Eindhoven	0–1	0–0	0–1

== Supporters and fan culture ==
'The three seagulls' in the City of Haugesund coat of arms inspired the name Maakeberget

Maakeberget (The Seagull Mountain or The Mountain of Seagulls) is the official but independent supporter club for FK Haugesund. The supporter club was founded on 8 May 1996. The origin of the name "Maakeberget" comes from the 3 gulls in the city's coat of arms and "The mountain inward the fjord and along the sea" when arriving to the city by sea. FK Haugesund has a strong presence in the city of Haugesund as well as in the Haugalandet-area, in general.

Maakebergets residence is the West Stand ("Vestre Stå") at Haugesund Stadion. The West stand is considered sacred ground among the supporters, not because there is anyone buried there, but because the supporters, who have their presence in the said stand, view this terrace as a temple for football in Haugesund. Maakeberget is a non-profit organization with strong democratic principles. There are no criteria that must be met to be a member, nor any age limit. The supporter club holds several member meetings a year, and the Board meets once a month. The board has a certain link to the management of the club, but still strives to keep the board / administration at arm's length. The supporter club also deals with the sale of supporter equipment in its own supporter shop, at the stadium and at Stamstedet on match days. All sales are based on dugnad, with a small profit to the Maakeberget, which goes back in full to the members with the main emphasis on support for away matches.

Maakeberget and supporters of FK Haugesund are often called "Maaker" ("Seagulls"), and sometimes "Arabs" by outside fans and commentators. However, FKH-supporters and people from Haugesund very rarely refer to themselves as "Arabs", and it is by some considered pejorative. A typical "maake" is often described as being born in the city, raised in the Flotmyr-part of the city of Haugesund, has little sympathy for rivals Viking FK and SK Brann, votes for right-wing Høyre or Progress Party (Norway) and has a passion, not only for the football team, but also for the city of Haugesund and the Haugalandet-area as a whole. However, one does not have to be "typical maake" at all to be a passionate supporter of the Fotballklubben Haugesund.

== Community activities ==
FK Haugesund is involved in various community activities, most notably the UngJobb-project.

UngJobb is a collaboration project between FK Haugesund, Haugesund municipality, NAV and Haugaland Industri for youth that is outside the school and labor market. The project provides youth with training, work practices and individual guidance. The project aims the provide training for young people and show what it takes to get to work, as well as good values, attitudes, interactions, affiliation and motivation. The goal of the project is permanent work for all young people who are involved.

FK Haugesund has also been involved in the Abrac project. The project involves fundraising and support for the Abrac orphanage in Brazil.

== Club rivalries ==
The main rival of FK Haugesund is Viking FK, and to a lesser degree SK Brann.

Viking is located in Stavanger, Rogaland, the same county as FK Haugesund. Viking is therefore the geographically closest rival to FK Haugesund, excluding Vard Haugesund. Viking is therefore considered the FKH's most important and biggest rival. Historically, SK Vard Haugesund have been perceived as minor local rivals due to their resistance in forming FK Haugesund in 1993.

The rivalries with Brann and Viking are often referred to as Vestlandsderbyet (the derby of Western Norway).

== Stadium and facilities ==
The stadium has an official capacity of 8,754. The stadium is colloquially referred to as "Gamlå" (the Old One).

Discussions of a new stadium or an upgrade have been carried out since the mid 2000s. In 2005 there was a proposal to build an all-new 8,000-seat stadium at Flotmyr.

In a 2012 survey carried out by the Norwegian Players' Association among away-team captains, Haugesund Stadion was ranked ninth amongst league stadiums, with a score of 3.20 on a scale from one to five. Haugesund Stadion was previously a multi-purpose stadium, but the running track was removed after the 2012 season.

The venue has hosted Norway national under-21 football team matches twice, playing 1–2 against Denmark on 23 June 1976 and 1–0 against Portugal on 19 April 1994. As of the end of the 2013 season, Haugesund Stadion has been used for 122 top-league matches. These include 11 games with Djerv 1919 in 1976, Vard in 1988 and FK Haugesund in 1997–98, 2000 and since 2010.

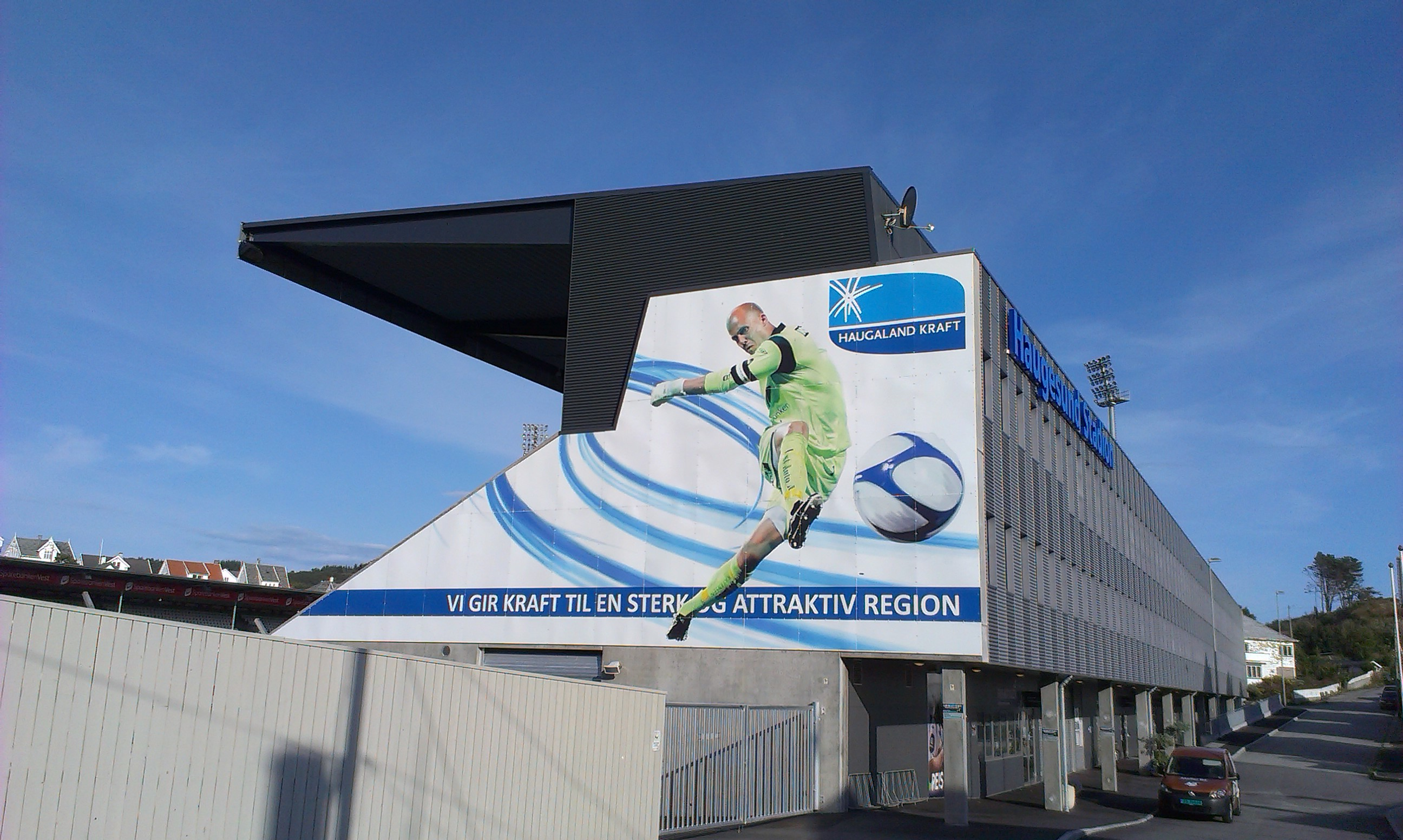

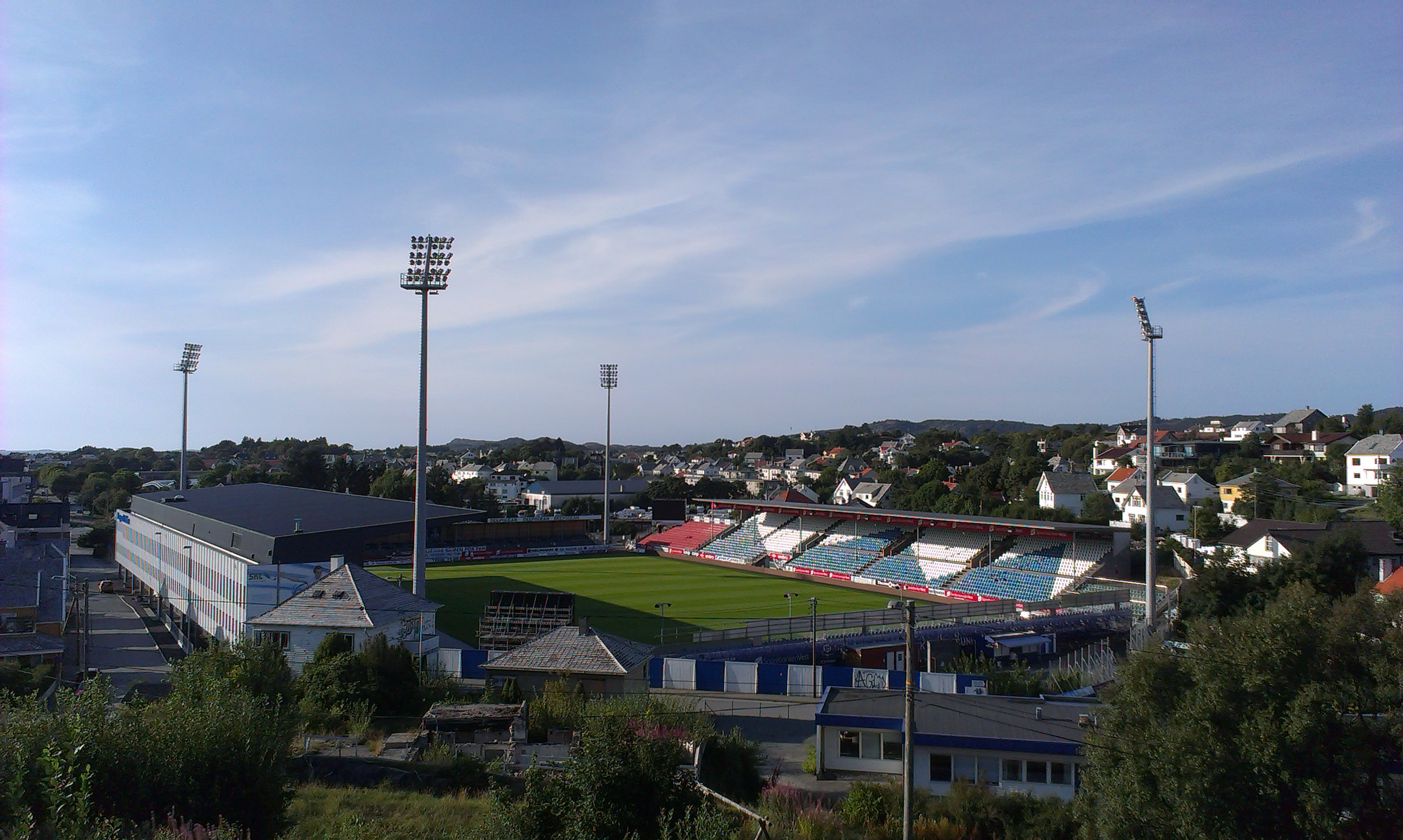

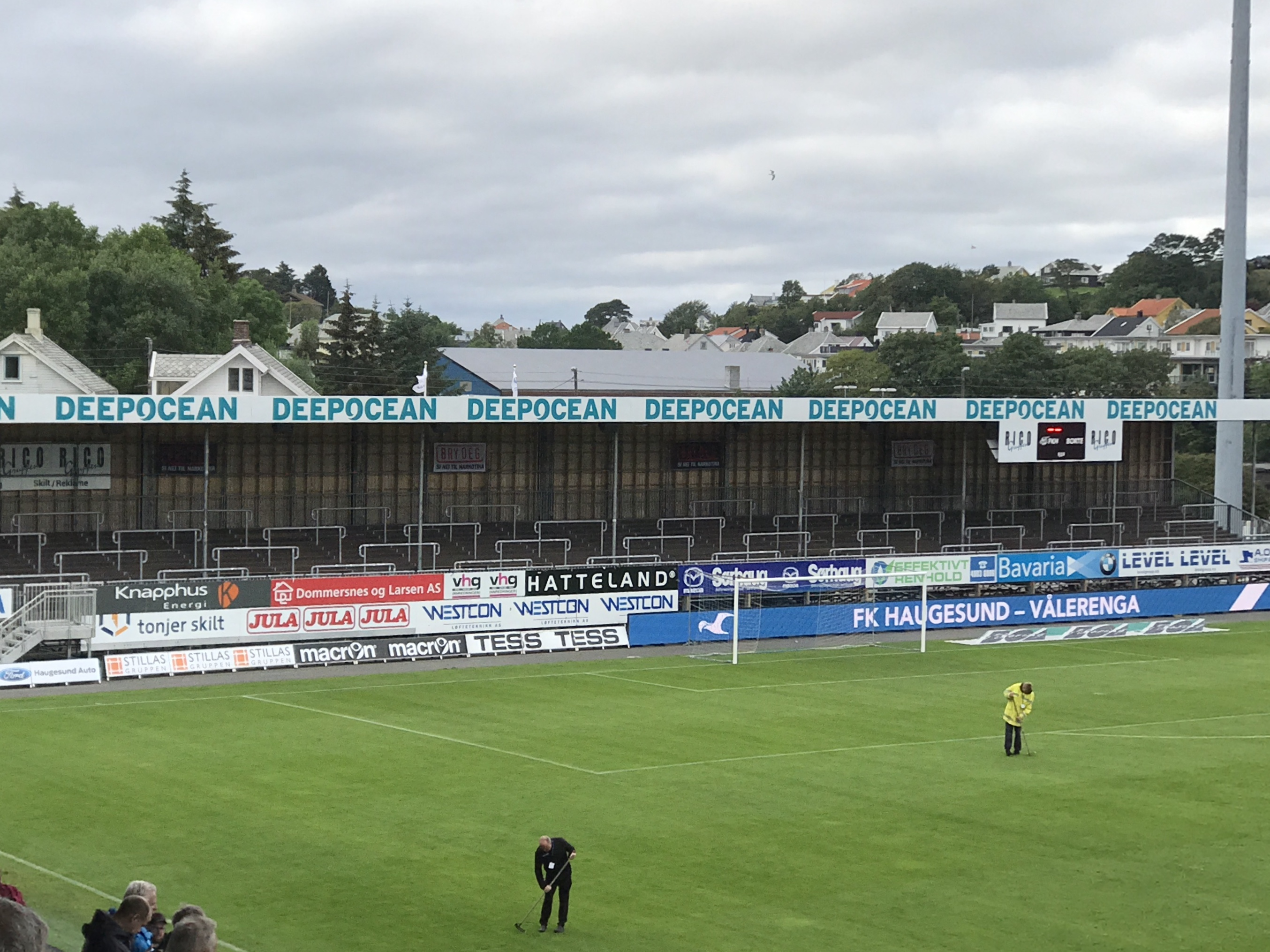

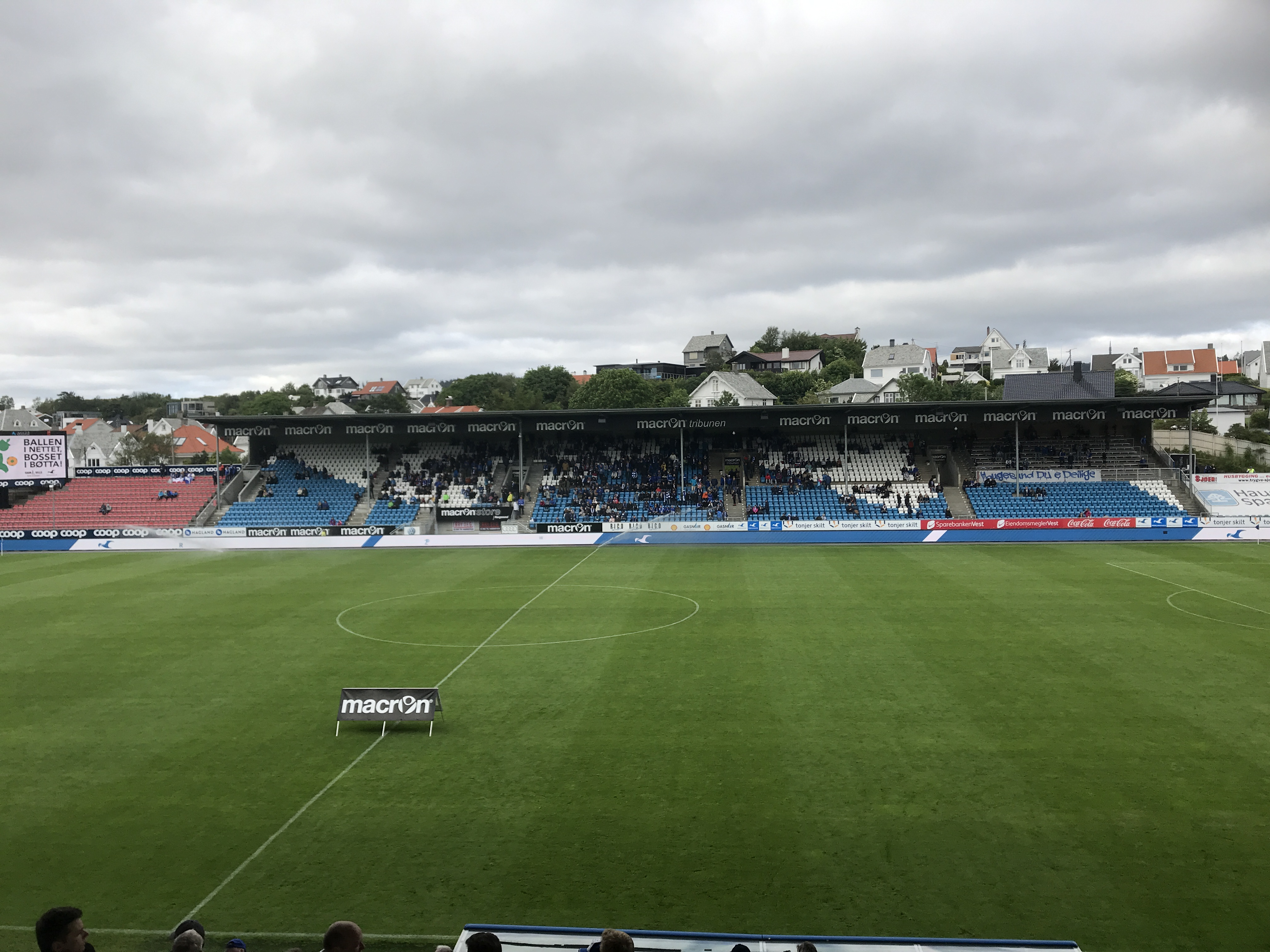

== Players ==
=== Current squad ===
As of 8 November 2026

Note: Flags indicate national team as defined under FIFA eligibility rules; some limited exceptions apply. Players may hold more than one non-FIFA nationality.

No.	Pos.	Nation	Player
1	GK	NOR	Per Kristian Bråtveit
3	DF	NOR	Stian Molde
4	DF	FIN	Miika Koskela
5	DF	DEN	Rasmus Møller
7	MF	DEN	Emil Rohd
8	MF	FIN	Pyry Hannola
10	MF	NOR	Emir Derviskadic
11	FW	NOR	Niklas Sandberg
13	GK	NZL	Kees Sims (on loan from GAIS)
14	MF	NOR	Sivert Heltne Nilsen
15	DF	NOR	Martin Bjørnbak
16	MF	CPV	Bruno Leite
18	DF	NOR	Vegard Solheim
19	FW	IDN	Lassana Doucouré

No.	Pos.	Nation	Player
20	FW	BFA	Ismaël Seone
21	GK	NOR	Einar Bøe Fauskanger
23	DF	NOR	Jonathan Norbye
25	DF	NOR	Mikkel Hope
26	FW	NOR	Eirik Viland Andersen
29	FW	MLI	Sory Ibrahim Diarra
30	FW	CIV	Ismael Camara
31	DF	NOR	Sebastian Lønning
32	GK	NOR	Frank Stople
40	MF	NOR	Almar Grindhaug
41	MF	NOR	Lars Remmem (on loan from Brann)
42	DF	NOR	Anders Bondhus
46	FW	NOR	Fabian Jakobsen

For season transfers, see List of Norwegian football transfers winter 2025–26, and List of Norwegian football transfers summer 2026.

=== Out on loan ===
Note: Flags indicate national team as defined under FIFA eligibility rules; some limited exceptions apply. Players may hold more than one non-FIFA nationality.

No.	Pos.	Nation	Player
17	FW	NOR	Håvard Vatland Karlsen (at Raufoss until 31 December 2026)
39	MF	NOR	Martin Alvsaker (at Vard Haugesund until 31 December 2026)

=== Notable former players ===
- (Bosnia and Herzegovina) Haris Hajradinovic
- (Brazil) Daniel Bamberg
- (Canada) Chris Pozniak
- (Canada) Kevin de Serpa
- (Canada) Milan Kojic
- (Cape Verde) Paulo Dos Santos
- (Costa Rica) Carlos Castro
- (Costa Rica) Rodolfo Rodriguez
- (Croatia) Marko Ćosić
- (Denmark) Allan Olesen
- (Denmark) Christian Gytkjær
- (Denmark) Henrik Kildentoft
- (Denmark) Jacob Sørensen
- (Denmark) Martin Christensen
- (Denmark) Pascal Gregor
- (Denmark) Patrick Olsen
- (Denmark) Søren Christensen
- (Finland) Benjamin Källman
- (Finland) Roope Riski
- (Finland) Juska Savolainen
- (Finland) Toni Tervonen
- (France) Derek Decamps
- (Ghana) Kwame Karikari
- (Guadeloupe) Mickaël Antoine-Curier
- (Ivory Coast) Victorien Djedje
- (Netherlands) Beau Molenaar
- (Nigeria) Babajide David Akintola
- (Nigeria) Bala Garba
- (Nigeria) Felix Ademola
- (Nigeria) Umaru Bangura
- (Nigeria) William Troost-Ekong
- (Norway) Alexander Søderlund
- (Norway) Asbjørn Helgeland
- (Norway) Christian Grindheim
- (Norway) (Greece) Christos Zafeiris
- (Norway) Eirik Horneland
- (Norway) Eirik Ulland Andersen
- (Norway) Erik Huseklepp
- (Norway) Geir Ludvig Fevang
- (Norway) Håvard Nordtveit
- (Norway) Henrik Kjelsrud Johansen
- (Norway) Jan Kjell Larsen
- (Norway) Joakim Våge Nilsen
- (Norway) Jonas Johansen
- (Norway) Jone Samuelsen
- (Norway) Jostein Grindhaug
- (Norway) Kenneth Høie
- (Norway) Kjetil Løvvik
- (Norway) Kristoffer Haraldseid
- (Norway) Martin Bjørnbak
- (Norway) Martin Samuelsen
- (Norway) Michael Haukås
- (Norway) Morten Berre
- (Norway) Morten Hæstad
- (Norway) Morten Moldskred
- (Norway) Per Kristian Bråtveit
- (Norway) Per Morten Kristiansen
- (Norway) Stian Ringstad
- (Norway) Thomas Sørum
- (Norway) Tor Arne Andreassen
- (Norway) Torbjørn Agdestein
- (Norway) Trond Erik Bertelsen
- (Norway) Trygve Nygaard
- (Senegal) Simon Diedhiou
- (Serbia) Dušan Cvetinović
- (Serbia) Nemanja Tubic
- (Serbia) Nikola Đurđić
- (Serbia) Nikola Komazec
- (Slovakia) Filip Kiss
- (Slovenia) Rok Elsner
- (Somalia) Liban Abdi
- (Sweden) Anders Blomquist
- (Sweden) David Myrestam
- (Sweden) Douglas Bergqvist
- (Sweden) Hasse Berggren
- (Sweden) John Pelu
- (Sweden) Magnus Johansson
- (Sweden) Maic Sema
- (Sweden) Pontus Engblom

== Staff ==
Coaching staff
Position	Name
Head coach	Øyvind Hompland (interim)
Assistant coach	Dennis Horneland
Goalkeeper coach	Kamil Rylka
Physical coach	Harald Andreassen
Reserve team coach	Milenko Caceres
U-16 coach	Øyvind Hompland
Head of youth development	Kolbjørn Fosen
Director of football	Kristoffer Haraldseid
Head physio	Ørjan Sørhus
Sporting coordinator	Jon Olav Rokstad
Nutritionist	Ellinor Loge Hauge

Administrative managers
Position	Name
Chairman of the Board	Leiv Helge Kaldheim
Chief executive officer	Leif Birkeland (interim)
Head of media	Runar Nordvik
Head of sales	Anders Velde
Private market manager	Mai Vibeke Haaland Simonsen
Head of IT	Lars Ingolf Sexe
Supporter coordinator	Randi Hettervik Flesjå

== Managers ==
Name	Year(s)
(Sweden) Conny Karlsson	1994–1998
(Norway) Åge Steen	1 Jan 1999– 6 Aug 2000
(Norway) Kjell-Inge Bråtveit	7 Aug 2000 – 31 Dec 2002
(Norway) Harald Aabrekk	2002–2005
(Norway) Rune Skarsfjord	2006–2008
(Norway) Jostein Grindhaug	2009–2015
(England) Mark Dempsey	1 Jan 2016 – 14 July 2016
(Italy) Andrea Loberto	14 July 2016 – 31 Oct 2016
(Norway) Eirik Horneland	31 Oct 2016 – 8 Jan 2019
(Norway) Jostein Grindhaug	9 Jan 2019 – 4 Sep 2023
(Denmark) Sancheev Manoharan	10 Sep 2023 – 31 Dec 2023
(Iceland) Óskar Hrafn Þorvaldsson	1 January 2024 – 10 May 2024
(Denmark) Sancheev Manoharan	24 May 2024 – 26 May 2025
(Finland) Toni Korkeakunnas	27 May 2025 – 9 March 2026
(Norway) Endre Eide	22 April 2026 – present

== Honours ==
- Eliteserien
  - Third place (1): 2013
- Norwegian Cup
  - Runners-up (2): 2007, 2019
