= 2017 FK Haugesund season =

Haugesund
2017 season
- Chairman: Leif Helge Kaldheim
- Manager: Eirik Horneland
- Stadium: Haugesund Stadion
- Tippeligaen: 10th
- Norwegian Cup: Fourth round vs Molde
- UEFA Europa League: Second qualifying round vs Lech Poznań
- Top goalscorer: League: Frederik Gytkjær; Shuaibu Ibrahim (6 each); All: Shuaibu Ibrahim (11)
Home colours	Away colours

The 2017 season is Haugesund's 8th season in the Tippeligaen following their promotion in 2009.

== Squad ==
As of 23 August 2017

Note: Flags indicate national team as defined under FIFA eligibility rules; some limited exceptions apply. Players may hold more than one non-FIFA nationality.

No.	Pos.	Nation	Player
1	GK	NOR	Per Kristian Bråtveit
4	DF	NOR	Fredrik Pallesen Knudsen
5	DF	CRO	Marko Ćosić
6	MF	POL	Jakub Serafin (on loan from Lech Poznań)
7	FW	SOM	Liban Abdi
8	MF	NOR	Sondre Tronstad
9	FW	DEN	Frederik Gytkjær
11	MF	NOR	Tor Arne Andreassen
12	GK	NOR	Helge Sandvik
13	MF	NOR	Eirik Mæland
15	DF	NGR	Izuchuckwu Anthony
16	MF	POR	Bruno Leite

No.	Pos.	Nation	Player
17	FW	NGR	Shuaibu Ibrahim
18	DF	NOR	Vegard Skjerve
19	DF	NOR	Kristoffer Haraldseid
22	DF	NOR	Alexander Stølås
24	GK	NOR	Herman Fossdal
26	DF	NOR	Sverre Bjørkkjær
29	MF	NOR	Robert Kling
31	MF	NOR	Kristoff Gunnarshaug
33	MF	NOR	Kristoffer Velde
35	MF	NGR	Anthony Ikedi (on loan from Gent)
55	MF	SRB	Aleksandar Kovačević

== Transfers ==
=== Winter ===
In: Note: Flags indicate national team as defined under FIFA eligibility rules; some limited exceptions apply. Players may hold more than one non-FIFA nationality.

No.	Pos.	Nation	Player
4	DF	NOR	Fredrik Pallesen Knudsen (from (Norway) Brann, previously on loan at (Norway) Åsane)
9	FW	DEN	Frederik Gytkjær (from (Denmark) Lyngby)
10	FW	NOR	Erik Huseklepp (from (Norway) Brann)
14	DF	BRA	Bruno Soares (from (Kazakhstan) Kairat)
16	MF	POR	Bruno Leite (from (Norway) Skeid)
20	FW	NOR	Johnny Per Buduson (from (Norway) Skeid)
23	MF	BIH	Haris Hajradinović (from (Belgium) Gent, previously on loan)
35	MF	NGR	Anthony Ikedi (on loan from (Belgium) Gent)

Out: Note: Flags indicate national team as defined under FIFA eligibility rules; some limited exceptions apply. Players may hold more than one non-FIFA nationality.

No.	Pos.	Nation	Player
3	DF	SWE	David Myrestam (to (Sweden) GIF Sundsvall)
5	DF	NGR	William Troost-Ekong (loan return to (Belgium) Gent)
10	MF	NOR	Roy Miljeteig (to (Norway) Sandnes Ulf)
14	FW	NOR	Torbjørn Agdestein (to (Norway) Odd)
28	MF	NOR	Arent-Emil Hauge (on loan to (Norway) Vard Haugesund)
30	FW	NOR	Erling Myklebust (on loan to (Norway) Vard Haugesund)
55	DF	SRB	Nemanja Tubić (to (Serbia) Napredak Kruševac)
—	MF	GHA	Derrick Mensah (to (Slovenia) Aluminij, previously on loan at (Czech Republic) Karviná)

=== Summer ===
In: Note: Flags indicate national team as defined under FIFA eligibility rules; some limited exceptions apply. Players may hold more than one non-FIFA nationality.

No.	Pos.	Nation	Player
5	DF	CRO	Marko Ćosić (from (Croatia) NK Inter Zaprešić)
6	MF	POL	Jakub Serafin (on loan from (Poland) Lech Poznań)
55	MF	SRB	Aleksandar Kovačević (from (Poland) Lechia Gdańsk)

Out: Note: Flags indicate national team as defined under FIFA eligibility rules; some limited exceptions apply. Players may hold more than one non-FIFA nationality.

No.	Pos.	Nation	Player
6	MF	SVK	Filip Kiss (to (Saudi Arabia) Al-Ettifaq)
10	FW	NOR	Erik Huseklepp (on loan to (Norway) Åsane)
14	DF	BRA	Bruno Soares (to (Israel) Hapoel Tel Aviv)
20	FW	NOR	Johnny Per Buduson (on loan to (Norway) Fredrikstad FK)
23	MF	BIH	Haris Hajradinović (to (Croatia) NK Osijek)

== Competitions ==
=== Eliteserien ===
==== Results summary ====
Overall								Home						Away					
Pld	W	D	L	GF	GA	GD	Pts	W	D	L	GF	GA	GD	W	D	L	GF	GA	GD
30	11	6	13	35	39	−4	39	6	5	4	21	18	+3	5	1	9	14	21	−7

Last updated: 26 November 2017.
Source: see below

==== Results by round ====
Round	1	2	3	4	5	6	7	8	9	10	11	12	13	14	15	16	17	18	19	20	21	22	23	24	25	26	27	28	29	30
Ground	A	H	A	A	H	A	H	A	H	A	H	A	H	A	H	H	A	H	A	H	A	H	A	A	H	A	H	H	A	H
Result	L	W	W	L	D	W	D	L	L	L	D	W	W	D	W	W	L	D	W	D	W	W	L	L	W	L	L	L	L	L
Position	14	9	4	7	8	6	7	8	12	12	13	10	8	8	7	5	5	6	5	5	5	4	5	6	5	6	6	6	8	10

Updated to match(es) played on 26 November 2017. Source: see below
A = Away; H = Home; W = Win; D = Draw; L = Loss

==== Results ====
2 April 2017 1	Strømsgodset	3–1	Haugesund	Drammen
18:00 CEST (UTC+2)	Pedersen (yellow card) 20' (goal) 76'; Tagbajumi (yellow card) 23' (goal) 34', 81'	Report	Gytkjær 1'; Abdi (yellow card) 13' (yellow-red card) 59'; Andreassen (yellow card) 33'; Kiss (yellow card) 54'	Stadium: Marienlyst Stadion; Attendance: 5,575; Referee: Ola Hobber Nilsen

6 April 2017 2	Haugesund	4–3	Vålerenga	Haugesund
19:00 CEST (UTC+2)	Gytkjær 15', 90' (yellow card) 32'; Ibrahim 36', 47'	Report	Skjerve 38' (o.g.); Lundström (yellow card) 40'; Keita 70'; Juklerød (yellow card) 78'; Grødem 80'	Stadium: Haugesund Stadion; Attendance: 4,421; Referee: Tore Hansen

9 April 2017 3	Lillestrøm	0–2	Haugesund	Lillestrøm
18:00 CEST (UTC+2)	Knudtzon (yellow card) 7'; Udoji (yellow card) 66'	Report	Abdi 30' (yellow card) 67'; Ibrahim 90+2'	Stadium: Åråsen Stadion; Attendance: 5,090; Referee: Kai Erik Steen

17 April 2017 4	Brann	3–1	Haugesund	Bergen
18:00 CEST (UTC+2)	Børven 17', 77'; Nilsen 29'; Acosta (yellow card) 84'	Report	Abdi 61'; Kiss (yellow card) 70'	Stadium: Brann Stadion; Attendance: 11,348; Referee: Espen Eskås

24 April 2017 5	Haugesund	0–0	Molde	Haugesund
19:00 CEST (UTC+2)		Report	Gabrielsen (yellow card) 38'; Aursnes (yellow card) 82'	Stadium: Haugesund Stadion; Attendance: 3,788; Referee: Kai Erik Steen

30 April 2017 6	Stabæk	0–3	Haugesund	Bærum
18:00 CEST (UTC+2)	Kassi (yellow card) 69'; Lumanza (yellow card) 85'	Report	Kiss 43'; Huseklepp 53'; Hajradinović 83'	Stadium: Nadderud Stadion; Attendance: 4,001; Referee: Dag Vidar Hafsås

7 May 2017 7	Haugesund	0–0	Sogndal	Haugesund
18:00 CEST (UTC+2)		Report	Fredriksen (red card) 75'	Stadium: Haugesund Stadion; Attendance: 4,627; Referee: Martin Lundby

13 May 2017 8	Sandefjord	2–0	Haugesund	Sandefjord
18:00 CEST (UTC+2)	Seck 57'; Sødlund 88'	Report	Kiss (yellow card) 68'; Tronstad (yellow card) 75'	Stadium: Komplett Arena; Attendance: 3,167; Referee: Ola Hobber Nilsen

16 May 2017 9	Haugesund	0–2	Odd	Haugesund
18:00 CEST (UTC+2)	Hajradinović (yellow card) 45'	Report	Ruud 29', 51' (yellow card) 45+1'; Occéan (yellow card) 39'	Stadium: Haugesund Stadion; Attendance: 4,342; Referee: Espen Eskås

21 May 2017 10	Kristiansund	2–3	Haugesund	Kristiansund
18:00 CEST (UTC+2)	Qaka (yellow card) 44'; Stokke 46'; McDermott (yellow card) 53'; Sørli 60'; Mendy 84'	Report	Haraldseid (yellow card) 1'; McDermott 52'; Ulvestad 62' (o.g.)	Stadium: Atlanten Stadion; Attendance: 3,392; Referee: Trond Ivar Døvle

28 May 2017 11	Haugesund	0–0	Sarpsborg 08	Haugesund
18:00 CEST (UTC+2)	Kiss (yellow card) 50'	Report	Trondsen (yellow card) 79'	Stadium: Haugesund Stadion; Attendance: 4,004; Referee: Trygve Kjensli

4 June 2017 12	Aalesund	0–1	Haugesund	Ålesund
18:00 CEST (UTC+2)	Marlinho (yellow card) 49'	Report	Ibrahim 9' (yellow card) 59'; Skjerve (yellow card) 35'	Stadium: Color Line Stadion; Attendance: 5,764; Referee: Kai Erik Steen

18 June 2017 13	Haugesund	1–0	Rosenborg	Haugesund
18:00 CEST (UTC+2)	Hajradinović 3'; Knudsen (yellow card) 23'; Kiss (yellow card) 74'	Report	Lundemo (yellow card) 51'; Meling (red card) 80'	Stadium: Haugesund Stadion; Attendance: 5,385; Referee: Trond Ivar Døvle

25 June 2017 14	Viking	1–1	Haugesund	Stavanger
20:00 CEST (UTC+2)	Appiah 29'; Martinsen (yellow card) 32'; Sale (yellow card) 64'; Ernemann (yellow card) 83'	Report	Abdi (yellow card) 39'; Hajradinović (yellow card) 43'; Knudsen (yellow card) 80'; Skjerve 88' (yellow card) 90+3'	Stadium: Viking Stadion; Attendance: 8,234; Referee: Rohit Saggi

2 July 2017 15	Haugesund	2–0	Tromsø	Haugesund
18:00 CEST (UTC+2)	Kiss 17' (pen.) (yellow card) 21'; Leite (yellow card) 51'; Abdi 83'	Report	Pedersen (yellow card) 17' (yellow-red card) 74'; Gundersen (yellow card) 18'	Stadium: Haugesund Stadion; Attendance: 4,077; Referee: Kristoffer Hagenes

12 July 2017 16	Vålerenga	–	Haugesund	Oslo
19:00 CEST (UTC+2)				Stadium: Ullevaal Stadion

16 July 2017 17	Haugesund	2–0	Aalesund	Haugesund
18:00 CEST (UTC+2)	Skjerve (yellow card) 21'; Ibrahim 55'; Andreassen 84'	Report	Carlsen (yellow card) 38'; Gyasi (yellow card) 68'; Ramsteijn (yellow card) 90+2'	Stadium: Haugesund Stadion; Attendance: 3,831; Referee: Espen Eskås

6 August 2017 18	Sarpsborg 08	2–1	Haugesund	Sarpsborg
18:00 CEST (UTC+2)	Ćosić 63' (o.g.); Halvorsen 90+4'	Report	Ćosić (yellow card) 1'; Rosted (yellow card) 32'	Stadium: Sarpsborg Stadion; Attendance: 4,396; Referee: Ola Hobber Nilsen

13 August 2017 19	Haugesund	2–2	Stabæk	Haugesund
18:00 CEST (UTC+2)	Abdi 9'; Andreassen 40'	Report	Kassi (yellow card) 32'; Omoijuanfo 64' (yellow card) 88'; Gyasi 66'; Vetlesen (yellow card) 83'	Stadium: Haugesund Stadion; Attendance: 3,827; Referee: Tore Hansen

20 August 2017 20	Rosenborg	0–1	Haugesund	Trondheim
18:00 CEST (UTC+2)	Rasmussen (yellow card) 62'; Trondsen (yellow card) 90'	Report	Reginiussen 26' (o.g.); Knudsen (yellow card) 53'	Stadium: Lerkendal Stadion; Attendance: 16,285; Referee: Espen Andreas Eskås

10 September 2017 21	Haugesund	1–1	Lillestrøm	Haugesund
18:00 CEST (UTC+2)	Abdi 19'; Kovačević (yellow card) 73'	Report	Andreassen 53'	Stadium: Haugesund Stadion; Attendance: 4,242; Referee: Trygve Kjensli

17 September 2017 22	Sogndal	0–1	Haugesund	Sogndalsfjøra
18:00 CEST (UTC+2)	Birkelund (yellow card) 22'; Greenidge (yellow card) 76'	Report	Gytkjær 68'; Abdi (yellow card) 77'; Knudsen (yellow card) 82'	Stadium: Fosshaugane Campus; Attendance: 2,589; Referee: Tom Harald Hagen

23 September 2017 23	Haugesund	2–1	Viking	Haugesund
18:00 CEST (UTC+2)	Kovačević (yellow card) 45'; Stølås 78' (yellow card) 80'; Skjerve 90+5'	Report	Høiland (yellow card) 45'; Haugen 45+1' (yellow card) 80'; Green (yellow card) 90+6'	Stadium: Haugesund Stadion; Attendance: 5,919; Referee: Kai Erik Steen

1 October 2017 24	Odd	1–0	Haugesund	Skien
18:00 CEST (UTC+2)	Hussain 44'; Berge (yellow card) 51'	Report	Gytkjær (yellow card) 63'; Ćosić (yellow card) 71'	Stadium: Skagerak Arena; Attendance: 6,899; Referee: Kristoffer Hagenes

12 October 2017 16	Vålerenga	3–0	Haugesund	Oslo
19:00 CEST (UTC+2)	Stengel 27' (pen.); Johansen 34' (yellow card) 61'; Juklerød (yellow card) 64' (goal) 85'; Jääger (yellow card) 79'; Myhre (yellow card) 90+3'	Report	Stølås (yellow card) 26'	Stadium: Intility Arena; Attendance: 9,204; Referee: Rohit Saggi

15 October 2017 25	Haugesund	2–0	Sandefjord	Haugesund
18:00 CEST (UTC+2)	Serafin (yellow card) 12'; Ikedi 16'; Ibrahim 83'; Andreassen (yellow card) 88'; Tronstad (yellow card) 90+2'	Report	van Berkel (yellow card) 73'; Morer (yellow card) 81'; Kastrati (yellow card) 86'	Stadium: Haugesund Stadion; Attendance: 3,721; Referee: Dag Vidar Hafsås

22 October 2017 26	Molde	1–0	Haugesund	Molde
18:00 CEST (UTC+2)	Sarr 29'; Moström (yellow card) 45+1'	Report		Stadium: Aker Stadion; Attendance: 6,866; Referee: Martin Lundby

28 October 2017 27	Haugesund	2–3	Brann	Haugesund
18:00 CEST (UTC+2)	Andreassen 17'; Ikedi 44'; Ćosić (yellow card) 60'; Haraldseid (yellow card) 88'; Serafin (yellow card) 90+4'	Report	Barmen 23'; Wormgoor 60' (pen.); Marengo (yellow card) 62'; Børven 82'; Haugen (yellow card) 90+5'	Stadium: Haugesund Stadion; Attendance: 6,100; Referee: Espen Eskås

5 November 2017 28	Haugesund	1–3	Strømsgodset	Haugesund
18:00 CET (UTC+1)	Serafin 5'; Ibrahim (yellow card) 56'	Report	Jradi 7'; Glesnes 57' (yellow card) 68'; Andersen 63'	Stadium: Haugesund Stadion; Attendance: 3,709; Referee: Sigurd Kringstad

19 November 2017 29	Tromsø	2–0	Haugesund	Tromsø
18:00 CET (UTC+1)	Olsen 21'; Pedersen 47'	Report	Knudsen (yellow card) 26'; Serafin (yellow card) 62'	Stadium: Alfheim Stadion; Attendance: 3,863; Referee: Trygve Kjensli

26 November 2017 30	Haugesund	2–3	Kristiansund	Haugesund
18:00 CET (UTC+1)	Gytkjær 32', 45+1'; Andreassen (yellow card) 90+3'; Sandvik (yellow card) 90+5'	Report	Sørli 19'; Gjertsen 51'; Bamba 66'; Coly (yellow card) 86'	Stadium: Haugesund Stadion; Attendance: 4,834; Referee: Kristoffer Hagenes

==== Table ====
Pos	Team	Pld	W	D	L	GF	GA	GD	Pts	Qualification or relegation
8	Vålerenga	30	11	6	13	48	46	+2	39	
9	Stabæk	30	10	9	11	46	50	−4	39	
10	Haugesund	30	11	6	13	35	39	−4	39	
11	Tromsø	30	10	8	12	42	49	−7	38	
12	Lillestrøm	30	10	7	13	40	43	−3	37	Qualification for the Europa League second qualifying round (Note: Lillestrøm qualified for the Europa League second qualifying round as winners of the 2017 Norwegian Cup.)

Source: Football Association of Norway (in Norwegian), Soccerway
Rules for classification: 1) Points; 2) Goal difference; 3) Goals scored; 4) Head-to-head points; 5) Head-to-head goal difference; 6) Head-to-head away goals scored (only if between two teams); 7) Head-to-head goals scored; 8) Play-off (only used to decide champions or relegation).

=== Norwegian Cup ===
27 April 2017 First Round	Vidar	0–3	Haugesund	Stavanger
18:00 CEST (UTC+2)		Report	Andreassen 39'; Stølås (yellow card) 43'; Gytkjær 70'; Buduson 90+4'	Stadium: Lassa Idrettspark; Attendance: 300; Referee: Daniel Higraff

24 May 2017 Second Round	Vard Haugesund	0–6	Haugesund	Haugesund
18:00 CEST (UTC+2)	M.Hindal (yellow card) 90'	Report	Ibrahim 11', 16'; Kiss 24'; Soares (yellow card) 43'; Huseklepp 80', 90+1'; Buduson 87'	Stadium: Haugesund Stadion; Attendance: 880; Referee: Steinar Hauge

31 May 2017 Third Round	Egersund	1–2 (a.e.t.)	Haugesund	Egersund
18:30 CEST (UTC+2)	M.Madsen (yellow card) 77'; B.Sumareh (yellow card) 90+2'; S.Larsen 118'	Report	Wawrzynkiewicz 103' (o.g.); Ibrahim 108'; Hajradinović (yellow card) 120'	Stadium: Idrettsparken; Attendance: 1,024; Referee: Tore Hansen

9 August 2017 Fourth Round	Haugesund	0–2	Molde	Haugesund
18:00 CEST (UTC+2)	Serafin (yellow card) 16'; Hajradinović (yellow card) 22' (yellow-red card); Ćosić (yellow card) 85'; Andreassen (yellow card) 88'	Report	Brustad 3'; Sigurðarson 66'; Remmer (yellow card) 83'	Stadium: Haugesund Stadion; Attendance: 2,688; Referee: Rohit Saggi

=== UEFA Europa League ===
==== Qualifying rounds ====
29 June 2017 First qualifying round 1st leg	Haugesund (Norway)	7–0	(Northern Ireland) Coleraine	Haugesund, Norway
19:00 CEST (UTC+2)	Tronstad 8'; Abdi 33'; Skjerve (yellow card) 39'; Hajradinović 42'; Ikedi 49'; Ibrahim 52'; Huseklepp 61'; Buduson 71'	Report	Bradley (yellow card) 14'; S.O'Donnell (yellow card) 18'	Stadium: Haugesund Stadion; Attendance: 2,523; Referee: Alexandru Tean (Moldova)

6 July 2017 First qualifying round 2nd leg	Coleraine (Northern Ireland)	0–0 (0–7 agg.)	(Norway) Haugesund	Coleraine, Northern Ireland
20:45 CEST (UTC+2)	J.McGonigle (yellow card) 42'	Report		Stadium: The Showgrounds; Attendance: 944; Referee: Carlos Xistra (Portugal)

13 July 2017 Second qualifying round 1st leg	Haugesund (Norway)	3–2	(Poland) Lech Poznań	Haugesund, Norway
19:00 CEST (UTC+2)	Abdi 24'; Hajradinović (yellow card) 31' (goal) 71'; Kiss (yellow card) 45'; Ibrahim 73'; Stølås (yellow card) 78'	Report	Gumny (yellow card) 27'; Majewski (yellow card) 68' (goal) 75'; Tetteh (yellow card) 85'; Jevtić 90+3'	Stadium: Haugesund Stadion; Attendance: 4,011; Referee: Alain Bieri (Switzerland)

20 July 2017 Second qualifying round 2nd leg	Lech Poznań (Poland)	2–0 (4–3 agg.)	(Norway) Haugesund	Poznań, Poland
20:00 CEST (UTC+2)	Jevtić 32'; Nielsen (yellow card) 85' (goal) 90+3'; Šitum (yellow card) 87'	Report	Abdi (yellow card) 40' (red card) 76'; Andreassen (yellow card) 77'; Leite (yellow card) 90+5'	Stadium: Stadion Miejski; Referee: Alexander Harkam (Austria)

== Squad statistics ==
As of match played 26 November 2017

=== Appearances and goals ===
No.	Pos	Nat	Player	Total		Tippeligaen		Norwegian Cup		UEFA Europa League	
No.	Pos	Nat	Player	Apps	Goals	Apps	Goals	Apps	Goals	Apps	Goals
1	GK	(Norway) NOR	Per Kristian Bråtveit	31	0	28	0	1	0	2	0
4	DF	(Norway) NOR	Fredrik Pallesen Knudsen	30	0	26	0	1	0	3	0
5	DF	(Croatia) CRO	Marko Ćosić	9	0	3+5	0	1	0	0	0
6	MF	(Poland) POL	Jakub Serafin	11	1	10	1	1	0	0	0
7	FW	(Somalia) SOM	Liban Abdi	29	7	23+1	5	1	0	4	2
8	MF	(Norway) NOR	Sondre Tronstad	37	1	23+6	0	4	0	3+1	1
9	FW	(Denmark) DEN	Frederik Gytkjær	30	7	13+12	6	1+1	1	1+2	0
11	MF	(Norway) NOR	Tor Arne Andreassen	29	4	18+5	3	2+1	1	1+2	0
12	GK	(Norway) NOR	Helge Sandvik	7	0	2	0	3	0	2	0
13	MF	(Norway) NOR	Eirik Mæland	4	0	4	0	0	0	0	0
15	DF	(Nigeria) NGR	Izuchuckwu Anthony	1	0	1	0	0	0	0	0
16	MF	(Portugal) POR	Bruno Leite	29	0	22+1	0	2+1	0	2+1	0
17	FW	(Nigeria) NGR	Shuaibu Ibrahim	36	11	24+5	6	2+1	3	3+1	2
18	DF	(Norway) NOR	Vegard Skjerve	36	2	29	2	3	0	4	0
19	DF	(Norway) NOR	Kristoffer Haraldseid	35	0	28	0	4	0	3	0
22	DF	(Norway) NOR	Alexander Stølås	38	1	30	1	4	0	4	0
26	DF	(Norway) NOR	Sverre Bjørkkjær	6	0	0+2	0	0+2	0	1+1	0
29	MF	(Norway) NOR	Robert Kling	2	0	0	0	1+1	0	0	0
33	MF	(Norway) NOR	Kristoffer Velde	9	0	2+7	0	0	0	0	0
35	MF	(Nigeria) NGR	Anthony Ikedi	17	3	4+9	2	1+1	0	2	1
55	MF	(Serbia) SRB	Aleksandar Kovačević	8	0	3+3	0	1+1	0	0	0
Players away from Haugesund on loan:
10	FW	(Norway) NOR	Erik Huseklepp	22	4	10+5	1	1+2	2	1+3	1
20	FW	(Norway) NOR	Johnny Per Buduson	18	3	1+12	0	3	2	1+1	1
Players who left Haugesund during the season:
6	MF	(Slovakia) SVK	Filip Kiss	21	3	14	2	3	1	4	0
14	DF	(Brazil) BRA	Bruno Soares	2	0	0	0	2	0	0	0
23	MF	(Bosnia and Herzegovina) BIH	Haris Hajradinović	21	4	12+2	2	3+1	0	3	2

=== Goal scorers ===
Place	Position	Nation	Number	Name	Tippeligaen	Norwegian Cup	UEFA Europa League	Total
1	FW	(Nigeria)	17	Shuaibu Ibrahim	6	3	2	11
2	FW	(Denmark)	9	Frederik Gytkjær	6	1	0	7
2	FW	(Somalia)	7	Liban Abdi	5	0	2	7
4				Own goal	4	1	0	5
5	MF	(Norway)	11	Tor Arne Andreassen	3	1	0	4
5	MF	(Bosnia and Herzegovina)	23	Haris Hajradinović	2	0	2	4
5	FW	(Norway)	10	Erik Huseklepp	1	2	1	4
8	MF	(Slovakia)	6	Filip Kiss	2	1	0	3
8	MF	(Nigeria)	35	Anthony Ikedi	2	0	1	3
8	FW	(Norway)	20	Johnny Per Buduson	0	2	1	3
11	DF	(Norway)	18	Vegard Skjerve	1	1	0	2
12	DF	(Norway)	22	Alexander Stølås	1	0	0	1
12	MF	(Poland)	6	Jakub Serafin	1	0	0	1
12	MF	(Norway)	8	Sondre Tronstad	0	0	1	1
				TOTALS	35	11	10	56

=== Disciplinary record ===
Number	Nation	Position	Name	Tippeligaen		Norwegian Cup		UEFA Europa League		Total	
Number	Nation	Position	Name	Yellow card	Red card	Yellow card	Red card	Yellow card	Red card	Yellow card	Red card
4	(Norway)	DF	Fredrik Pallesen Knudsen	5	0	0	0	0	0	5	0
5	(Croatia)	DF	Marko Ćosić	3	0	1	0	0	0	4	0
6	(Slovakia)	MF	Filip Kiss	6	0	0	0	1	0	7	0
6	(Poland)	MF	Jakub Serafin	3	0	1	0	0	0	4	0
7	(Somalia)	FW	Liban Abdi	5	1	0	0	1	1	6	2
8	(Norway)	MF	Sondre Tronstad	2	0	0	0	0	0	2	0
9	(Denmark)	FW	Frederik Gytkjær	2	0	0	0	0	0	2	0
11	(Norway)	MF	Tor Arne Andreassen	3	0	1	0	1	0	5	0
12	(Norway)	GK	Helge Sandvik	1	0	0	0	0	0	1	0
14	(Brazil)	DF	Bruno Soares	0	0	1	0	0	0	1	0
16	(Portugal)	MF	Bruno Leite	1	0	0	0	1	0	2	0
17	(Nigeria)	FW	Shuaibu Ibrahim	2	0	0	0	0	0	2	0
18	(Norway)	DF	Vegard Skjerve	3	0	0	0	1	0	4	0
19	(Norway)	DF	Kristoffer Haraldseid	2	0	0	0	0	0	2	0
22	(Norway)	DF	Alexander Stølås	3	0	0	0	1	0	4	0
23	(Bosnia and Herzegovina)	MF	Haris Hajradinović	2	0	3	1	1	0	6	1
55	(Serbia)	MF	Aleksandar Kovačević	2	0	0	0	0	0	2	0
			TOTALS	44	1	8	1	7	1	59	3
