= 2018 FK Haugesund season =

Haugesund
2018 season
- Chairman: Leif Helge Kaldheim
- Manager: Eirik Horneland
- Stadium: Haugesund Stadion
- Eliteserien: 4th
- Norwegian Cup: Quarter-final vs Strømsgodset
- Top goalscorer: League: Babajide David (9); All: Babajide David (9)
| Home colours | Away colours |

The 2018 season was Haugesund's 9th season in the Tippeligaen following their promotion in 2009.

== Squad ==
As of 16 August 2018

Note: Flags indicate national team as defined under FIFA eligibility rules; some limited exceptions apply. Players may hold more than one non-FIFA nationality.

| No. | Pos. | Nation | Player |
|---|---|---|---|
| 1 | GK | NOR | Per Kristian Bråtveit |
| 3 | DF | CIV | Benjamin Karamoko |
| 4 | DF | NOR | Fredrik Pallesen Knudsen |
| 5 | DF | CRO | Marko Ćosić |
| 6 | DF | NOR | Joakim Våge Nilsen |
| 7 | MF | NOR | Christian Grindheim |
| 8 | MF | NOR | Sondre Tronstad |
| 9 | MF | DEN | Frederik Gytkjær |
| 12 | GK | NOR | Helge Sandvik |
| 14 | MF | NOR | Torbjørn Kallevåg |
| 15 | MF | NGA | Izuchuckwu Anthony |
| 16 | MF | POR | Bruno Leite |

| No. | Pos. | Nation | Player |
|---|---|---|---|
| 17 | FW | SEN | Ibrahima Wadji |
| 18 | DF | NOR | Vegard Skjerve |
| 19 | DF | NOR | Kristoffer Haraldseid |
| 20 | FW | MLI | Ibrahima Konè |
| 21 | MF | NOR | Tobias Svendsen |
| 22 | MF | NOR | Alexander Stølås |
| 24 | GK | NOR | Herman Fossdal |
| 33 | FW | NOR | Kristoffer Velde |
| 34 | MF | NOR | Kevin Martin Krygard |
| 35 | MF | NGA | Anthony Ikedi |
| 77 | MF | NGA | Babajide David (on loan from Midtjylland) |

=== Out on loan ===
Note: Flags indicate national team as defined under FIFA eligibility rules; some limited exceptions apply. Players may hold more than one non-FIFA nationality.

| No. / Pos. / Nation / Player; 17 / FW / NGA / Shuaibu Ibrahim (on loan to Kongsvinger) | No. / Pos. / Nation / Player |

== Transfers ==
=== Winter ===
In: Note: Flags indicate national team as defined under FIFA eligibility rules; some limited exceptions apply. Players may hold more than one non-FIFA nationality.

| No. | Pos. | Nation | Player |
|---|---|---|---|
| 3 | DF | CIV | Benjamin Karamoko (from (France) Saint-Étienne) |
| 6 | DF | NOR | Joakim Våge Nilsen (from (Norway) Odd) |
| 7 | MF | NOR | Christian Grindheim (from (Norway) Vålerenga) |
| 14 | MF | NOR | Torbjørn Kallevåg (from (Norway) Hødd) |
| 20 | FW | MLI | Ibrahima Koné (from (Mali) CO de Bamako) |
| 25 | MF | CPV | Erin Pinheiro (loan from (France) Saint-Étienne) |
| 35 | MF | NGA | Anthony Ikedi (from (Belgium) Gent, previously on loan) |
| 77 | MF | NGA | Babajide David (on loan from (Denmark) Midtjylland) |

Out: Note: Flags indicate national team as defined under FIFA eligibility rules; some limited exceptions apply. Players may hold more than one non-FIFA nationality.

| No. | Pos. | Nation | Player |
|---|---|---|---|
| 6 | MF | POL | Jakub Serafin (loan return to (Poland) Lech Poznań) |
| 7 | FW | SOM | Liban Abdi (to (Saudi Arabia) Al-Ettifaq) |
| 10 | FW | NOR | Erik Huseklepp (to (Norway) Åsane, previously on loan) |
| 11 | MF | NOR | Tor Arne Andreassen (retired) |
| 13 | MF | NOR | Eirik Mæland (to (Norway) Fredrikstad) |
| 15 | MF | NGA | Izuchuckwu Anthony (loan to (Norway) Jerv) |
| 17 | FW | NGA | Shuaibu Ibrahim (loan to (Norway) Kongsvinger) |
| 20 | FW | NOR | Johnny Per Buduson (to (Norway) HamKam, previously on loan at (Norway) Fredrikstad) |
| 25 | MF | CPV | Erin Pinheiro (loan terminated) |
| 26 | DF | NOR | Sverre Bjørkkjær (to (Norway) Strømmen) |
| 28 | MF | NOR | Arent-Emil Hauge (on loan to (Norway) Vard Haugesund) |
| 29 | MF | NOR | Robert Kling (to (Norway) Florø) |
| — | FW | NOR | Erling Myklebust (to (Norway) Vard Haugesund, previously on loan) |

=== Summer ===
In: Note: Flags indicate national team as defined under FIFA eligibility rules; some limited exceptions apply. Players may hold more than one non-FIFA nationality.

| No. | Pos. | Nation | Player |
|---|---|---|---|
| 15 | MF | NGA | Izuchuckwu Anthony (loan return from (Norway) Jerv) |
| 17 | FW | SEN | Ibrahima Wadji (on loan from (Norway) Molde) |
| 21 | MF | NOR | Tobias Svendsen (on loan from (Norway) Molde) |

Out: Note: Flags indicate national team as defined under FIFA eligibility rules; some limited exceptions apply. Players may hold more than one non-FIFA nationality.

| No. | Pos. | Nation | Player |
|---|---|---|---|
| 31 | MF | NOR | Kristoffer Gunnarshaug (to (Norway) Lysekloster) |
| 55 | MF | SRB | Aleksandar Kovačević (to (Greece) Xanthi) |

== Competitions ==
=== Eliteserien ===
==== Results summary ====
| Overall | | | | | | | | Home | | | | | | Away | | | | | |
| Pld | W | D | L | GF | GA | GD | Pts | W | D | L | GF | GA | GD | W | D | L | GF | GA | GD |
|---|---|---|---|---|---|---|---|---|---|---|---|---|---|---|---|---|---|---|---|
| 30 | 16 | 5 | 9 | 45 | 33 | +12 | 53 | 10 | 2 | 3 | 25 | 14 | +11 | 6 | 3 | 6 | 20 | 19 | +1 |

Last updated: 24 November 2018.
Source: see below

==== Results by round ====
| Round | 1 | 2 | 3 | 4 | 5 | 6 | 7 | 8 | 9 | 10 | 11 | 12 | 13 | 14 | 15 | 16 | 17 | 18 | 19 | 20 | 21 | 22 | 23 | 24 | 25 | 26 | 27 | 28 | 29 | 30 |
|---|---|---|---|---|---|---|---|---|---|---|---|---|---|---|---|---|---|---|---|---|---|---|---|---|---|---|---|---|---|---|
| Ground | A | H | A | H | A | H | A | A | H | A | H | H | A | H | A | H | A | H | A | H | A | H | A | H | A | H | A | H | A | H |
| Result | W | L | W | D | L | W | W | D | W | D | L | W | W | D | L | W | W | W | D | W | L | L | L | W | W | W | L | W | L | W |
| Position | 4 | 7 | 3 | 3 | 9 | 6 | 4 | 4 | 3 | 4 | 5 | 5 | 4 | 4 | 6 | 5 | 3 | 3 | 3 | 3 | 3 | 3 | 4 | 4 | 4 | 4 | 4 | 4 | 4 | 4 |

Updated to match(es) played on 24 November 2018. Source: see below
A = Away; H = Home; W = Win; D = Draw; L = Loss

==== Results ====
| 11 March 2018 1 | Odd | 1–2 | Haugesund | Skien |
| 18:00 CET (UTC+1) | Broberg 75' | Report | Berge 52'; Gytkjær 62' | Stadium: Skagerak Arena; Attendance: 4,466; Referee: Tom Harald Hagen |

| 17 March 2018 2 | Haugesund | 0–1 | Molde | Haugesund |
| 18:00 CET (UTC+1) | | Report | Aursnes 9'; Normann (yellow card) 85' | Stadium: Haugesund Stadion; Attendance: 3,820; Referee: Tore Hansen |

| 2 April 2018 3 | Bodø/Glimt | 0–3 | Haugesund | Bodø |
| 18:00 CEST (UTC+2) | Popović (yellow card) 81' | Report | Moe 20' (o.g.); David 42'; Kallevåg (yellow card) 45'; Gytkjær 82' (pen.) | Stadium: Aspmyra Stadion; Attendance: 2,934; Referee: Dag Vidar Hafsås |

| 8 April 2018 4 | Haugesund | 1–1 | Sarpsborg 08 | Haugesund |
| 18:00 CEST (UTC+2) | David 45'; Skjerve (yellow card) 90+4' | Report | Schwartz 50'; Singh (yellow card) 90+2' | Stadium: Haugesund Stadion; Attendance: 3,474; Referee: Espen Eskås |

| 15 April 2018 5 | Ranheim | 4–2 | Haugesund | Trondheim |
| 18:00 CEST (UTC+2) | Reginiussen 6', 67'; Storflor 16'; Tønne 84' | Report | Stølås 19'; Grindheim 62' | Stadium: EXTRA Arena; Attendance: 2,040; Referee: Tommy Skjerven |

| 22 April 2018 6 | Haugesund | 1–0 | Strømsgodset | Haugesund |
| 18:00 CEST (UTC+2) | Kallevåg 19' | Report | Júnior (yellow card) 34'; Pedersen (yellow card) 53'; Ringstad (yellow card) 61' | Stadium: Haugesund Stadion; Attendance: 3,690; Referee: Ola Hobber Nilsen |

| 29 April 2018 7 | Start | 0–1 | Haugesund | Kristiansand |
| 18:00: CEST (UTC+2) | Afeez (yellow card) 39' | Report | Gytkjær 49' (yellow card) 58'; Stølås (yellow card) 89' | Stadium: Sør Arena; Attendance: 4,159; Referee: Trygve Kjensli |

| 6 May 2018 8 | Vålerenga | 2–2 | Haugesund | Oslo |
| 18:00 CEST (UTC+2) | Carvalho 23'; Holm (yellow card) 33'; Michael 81' | Report | Skjerve 16'; Knudsen 64' | Stadium: Intility Arena; Attendance: 7,708; Referee: Tom Harald Hagen |

| 13 May 2018 9 | Haugesund | 3–2 | Kristiansund | Haugesund |
| 18:00 CEST (UTC+2) | David 37'; Gytkjær 71' (yellow card) 90+1'; Kallevåg 81' | Report | Bamba 1' (yellow card) 90+1'; Aasbak (yellow card) 31'; Aasmundsen (yellow card) 58'; Bye 90+4' | Stadium: Haugesund Stadion; Attendance: 4,063; Referee: Sigurd Smehus Kringstad |

| 16 May 2018 10 | Brann | 1–1 | Haugesund | Bergen |
| 18:00 CEST (UTC+2) | Nilsen (yellow card) 51'; Barmen 70'; Karadas (yellow card) 85' | Report | Haraldseid (yellow card) 32'; Grindheim 54' | Stadium: Brann Stadion; Referee: Espen Eskås |

| 21 May 2018 11 | Haugesund | 1–2 | Rosenborg | Haugesund |
| 18:00 CEST (UTC+2) | Gytkjær (penalty missed) 68'; Velde 88' (yellow card) 89' | Report | Søderlund 2', 27'; Rasmussen (yellow card) 20' (yellow-red card) 54' | Stadium: Haugesund Stadion; Attendance: 6,502; Referee: Trond Ivar Døvle |

| 27 May 2018 12 | Haugesund | 1–0 | Tromsø | Haugesund |
| 18:00 CEST (UTC+2) | Gytkjær 30' | Report | Ødegaard (yellow card) 89' | Stadium: Haugesund Stadion; Attendance: 4,192; Referee: Dag Vidar Hafsås |

| 10 June 2018 13 | Sandefjord | 0–2 | Haugesund | Sandefjord |
| 18:00 CEST (UTC+2) | Pálsson (yellow card) 11' (yellow-red card) 54'; Johansen (yellow card) 74'; Grorud (yellow card) 87' | Report | Skjerve 13'; Tronstad (yellow card) 19'; Karamoko 45'; Kallevåg (yellow card) 69' | Stadium: Komplett Arena; Attendance: 2,493; Referee: Kristoffer Hagenes |

| 24 June 2018 14 | Haugesund | 2–2 | Lillestrøm | Haugesund |
| 18:00 CEST (UTC+2) | David 43'; Stølås 77' | Report | Olsen 28', 51'; Kippe (yellow card) 80' | Stadium: Haugesund Stadion; Attendance: 4,311; Referee: Kai Erik Steen |

| 1 July 2018 15 | Stabæk | 2–1 | Haugesund | Bærum |
| 20:00 CEST (UTC+2) | Boli 35', 62' | Report | Velde 90+2' | Stadium: Nadderud Stadion; Attendance: 3,035; Referee: Rohit Saggi |

| 8 July 2018 16 | Haugesund | 4–2 | Sandefjord | Haugesund |
| 18:00 CEST (UTC+2) | David 64'; Karamoko 66'; Grindheim 90'; Leite 90+3' | Report | Engblom 8', 39'; Ofkir (yellow card) 38' | Stadium: Haugesund Stadion; Attendance: 3,504; Referee: Dag Vidar Hafsås |

| 5 August 2018 17 | Tromsø | 1–2 | Haugesund | Tromsø |
| 18:00 CEST (UTC+2) | Andersen 61'; Pedersen (yellow card) 74'; Wangberg (yellow card) 75' | Report | Koné 5'; Stølås 75' | Stadium: Alfheim Stadion; Attendance: 3,713; Referee: Kristoffer Hagenes |

| 13 August 2018 18 | Haugesund | 1–0 | Vålerenga | Haugesund |
| 19:00 CEST (UTC+2) | Tronstad (yellow card) 45'; Stølås 55' | Report | Finne (yellow card) 31'; Holm (yellow card) 42'; Tollås (yellow card) 90+1' | Stadium: Haugesund Stadion; Attendance: 4,083; Referee: Kai Erik Steen |

| 19 August 2018 19 | Lillestrøm | 1–1 | Haugesund | Lillestrøm |
| 18:00 CEST (UTC+2) | Smárason 33' (pen.) | Report | Wadji 10' (yellow card) 36'; Stølås (yellow card) 51'; Nilsen (yellow card) 56'; Kallevåg (yellow card) 90+3' | Stadium: Åråsen Stadion; Attendance: 4,676; Referee: Sigurd Smehus Kringstad |

| 26 August 2018 20 | Haugesund | 2–0 | Stabæk | Haugesund |
| 18:00 CEST (UTC+2) | David 32'; Nilsen 39' | Report | Keita (yellow card) 54' | Stadium: Haugesund Stadion; Attendance: 3,822; Referee: Tommy Skjerven |

| 2 September 2018 21 | Rosenborg | 1–0 | Haugesund | Trondheim |
| 18:00 CEST (UTC+2) | Denić (yellow card) 19'; Levi 23'; Jensen (yellow card) 88' | Report | Skjerve (yellow card) 55'; Ikedi (yellow card) 74' | Stadium: Lerkendal Stadion; Attendance: 15,427; Referee: Espen Eskås |

| 15 September 2018 22 | Haugesund | 1–3 | Brann | Haugesund |
| 18:00 CEST (UTC+2) | Knudsen (yellow card) 36'; Velde 80'; Tronstad (yellow card) 87' | Report | Bamba 9'; Rólantsson 12'; Barmen 62' | Stadium: Haugesund Stadion; Attendance: 7,523; Referee: Rohit Saggi |

| 23 September 2018 23 | Kristiansund | 2–1 | Haugesund | Kristiansund |
| 18:00 CEST (UTC+2) | Kastrati (yellow card) 48' (goal) 58'; Coly (yellow card) 52'; Kalludra 74' | Report | Skjerve 38'; Leite (yellow card) 73' | Stadium: Kristiansund Stadion; Attendance: 3,753; Referee: Dag Vidar Hafsås |

| 30 September 2018 24 | Haugesund | 1–0 | Bodø/Glimt | Haugesund |
| 18:00 CEST (UTC+2) | David 52' | Report | | Stadium: Haugesund Stadion; Attendance: 4,563; Referee: Kai Erik Steen |

| 6 October 2018 25 | Strømsgodset | 0–1 | Haugesund | Drammen |
| 18:00 CEST (UTC+2) | | Report | Leite (yellow card) 24'; Wadji 77' | Stadium: Marienlyst Stadion; Attendance: 5,477; Referee: Tore Hansen |

| 21 October 2018 26 | Haugesund | 2–0 | Odd | Haugesund |
| 18:00 CEST (UTC+2) | Tronstad (yellow card) 26'; David 32' (pen.); Wadji 59' | Report | Rossbach (yellow card) 45+1'; Ruud (yellow card) 51' | Stadium: Haugesund Stadion; Attendance: 3,931; Referee: Kristoffer Hagenes |

| 28 October 2018 27 | Sarpsborg 08 | 2–1 | Haugesund | Sarpsborg |
| 18:00 CET (UTC+1) | Heintz 5'; Mortensen 32'; Thomassen (yellow card) 71' | Report | David (yellow card) 53'; Wadji 59' (yellow card) 90+4'; Karamoko (yellow card) 74' | Stadium: Sarpsborg Stadion; Attendance: 4,555; Referee: Espen Eskås |

| 4 November 2018 28 | Haugesund | 2–0 | Ranheim | Haugesund |
| 18:00 CET (UTC+1) | Grindheim (yellow card) 33' (goal) 53'; Tronstad 41' | Report | Reginiussen (yellow card) 75' | Stadium: Haugesund Stadion; Attendance: 3,430; Referee: Trygve Kjensli |

| 11 November 2018 29 | Molde | 2–0 | Haugesund | Molde |
| 18:00 CET (UTC+1) | James 2'; Haugen 53' | Report | Knudsen (yellow card) 16' | Stadium: Aker Stadion; Attendance: 6,641; Referee: Tommy Skjerven |

| 24 November 2018 30 | Haugesund | 3–1 | Start | Haugesund |
| 18:00 CET (UTC+1) | David 59'; Wadji 68', 77' | Report | Akinyemi 12' (yellow card) 45+2'; Hadzic (yellow card) 33' | Stadium: Haugesund Stadion; Attendance: 3,841; Referee: Kai Erik Steen |

==== Table ====
| Pos | Team | Pld | W | D | L | GF | GA | GD | Pts | Qualification or relegation |
|---|---|---|---|---|---|---|---|---|---|---|
| 2 | Molde | 30 | 18 | 5 | 7 | 63 | 36 | +27 | 59 | Qualification for the Europa League first qualifying round |
| 3 | Brann | 30 | 17 | 7 | 6 | 45 | 31 | +14 | 58 | Qualification for the Europa League first qualifying round |
| 4 | Haugesund | 30 | 16 | 5 | 9 | 45 | 33 | +12 | 53 | Qualification for the Europa League first qualifying round |
| 5 | Kristiansund | 30 | 13 | 7 | 10 | 46 | 41 | +5 | 46 | |
| 6 | Vålerenga | 30 | 11 | 9 | 10 | 39 | 44 | −5 | 42 | |

Source: Football Association of Norway (in Norwegian), Soccerway
Rules for classification: 1) Points; 2) Goal difference; 3) Goals scored; 4) Head-to-head points; 5) Head-to-head goal difference; 6) Head-to-head away goals scored (only if between two teams); 7) Head-to-head goals scored; 8) Play-off (only used to decide champions or relegation).

=== Norwegian Cup ===
| 18 April 2018 First Round | Skjold | 0–3 | Haugesund | Skjold |
| 18:00 CEST (UTC+2) | | Report | Kovačević 13'; Velde 36'; Skjerve 41' | Stadium: Grinde kunstgras Attendance: 700; Referee: Mischa Kellerhals |

| 2 May 2018 Second Round | Lysekloster | 1–2 | Haugesund | Søvik |
| 18:00 CEST (UTC+2) | R.Mo (yellow card) 50'; Dyngeland 61'; E.Rode (yellow card) 90+1' | Report | Koné 38'; Velde 56'; Nilsen (yellow card) 84' | Stadium: Monastery Framo Idrettspark; Attendance: 501; Referee: Svein Tore Sinnes |

| 9 May 2018 Third Round | Nest-Sotra | 1–2 | Haugesund | Bergen |
| 18:00 CEST (UTC+2) | S.Liseth 19'; M.Bjørlo (yellow card) 72'; K.Bidne (yellow card) 90' | Report | Gytkjær 55', 90+2' | Stadium: Varden Amfi; Attendance: 603; Referee: Tom Harald Hagen |

| 13 June 2018 Fourth Round | Mjøndalen | 2–2 (a.e.t.) (6–7 p) | Haugesund | Mjøndalen |
| CEST (UTC+2) | Jansen 73', 90'; Eid (yellow card) 86' | Report | Grindheim 19'; Gytkjær 46' | Stadium: Mjøndalen Arena; Attendance: 1,071; Referee: Trygve Kjensli |
| | Penalties |
| | Gauseth (penalty scored); Hedlund (penalty missed); Lindseth (penalty scored); Sell (penalty scored); Eid (penalty scored); Bojang (penalty scored); Johansen (penalty scored); A.Hansen (penalty missed) | | (penalty missed) Stølås; (penalty scored) Haraldseid; (penalty scored) Velde; (penalty scored) Kallevåg; (penalty missed) Skjerve; (penalty scored) Koné; (penalty scored) Tronstad; (penalty scored) David |

| 26 September 2018 Quarterfinal | Haugesund | 0–1 | Strømsgodset | Haugesund |
| 18:00 CEST (UTC+2) | Stølås (yellow card) 55'; Tronstad (yellow card) 90' | Report | Abdellaoue 16'; Pellegrino (yellow card) 55'; Hauger (yellow card) 76'; Júnior (yellow card) 80'; Vilsvik (yellow card) 87' | Stadium: Haugesund Stadion; Attendance: 2,921; Referee: Trond Ivar Døvle |

== Squad statistics ==
As of match played 24 November 2018

=== Appearances and goals ===
| No. | Pos | Nat | Player | Total | | Tippeligaen | | Norwegian Cup | |
| No. | Pos | Nat | Player | Apps | Goals | Apps | Goals | Apps | Goals |
|---|---|---|---|---|---|---|---|---|---|
| 1 | GK | (Norway) NOR | Per Kristian Bråtveit | 27 | 0 | 24 | 0 | 3 | 0 |
| 3 | DF | (Ivory Coast) CIV | Benjamin Karamoko | 22 | 2 | 19+1 | 2 | 2 | 0 |
| 4 | DF | (Norway) NOR | Fredrik Pallesen Knudsen | 27 | 2 | 20+3 | 2 | 4 | 0 |
| 6 | DF | (Norway) NOR | Joakim Våge Nilsen | 34 | 1 | 30 | 1 | 3+1 | 0 |
| 7 | MF | (Norway) NOR | Christian Grindheim | 31 | 5 | 26+2 | 4 | 2+1 | 1 |
| 8 | MF | (Norway) NOR | Sondre Tronstad | 33 | 1 | 28+1 | 1 | 4 | 0 |
| 9 | FW | (Denmark) DEN | Frederik Gytkjær | 19 | 8 | 15+2 | 5 | 2 | 3 |
| 12 | GK | (Norway) NOR | Helge Sandvik | 8 | 0 | 6 | 0 | 2 | 0 |
| 14 | MF | (Norway) NOR | Torbjørn Kallevåg | 30 | 2 | 19+7 | 2 | 3+1 | 0 |
| 16 | MF | (Portugal) POR | Bruno Leite | 26 | 1 | 11+13 | 1 | 0+2 | 0 |
| 17 | FW | (Senegal) SEN | Ibrahima Wadji | 13 | 6 | 11+1 | 6 | 1 | 0 |
| 18 | DF | (Norway) NOR | Vegard Skjerve | 26 | 4 | 22 | 3 | 4 | 1 |
| 19 | DF | (Norway) NOR | Kristoffer Haraldseid | 34 | 0 | 29 | 0 | 5 | 0 |
| 20 | FW | (Mali) MLI | Ibrahima Koné | 27 | 2 | 10+12 | 1 | 4+1 | 1 |
| 21 | MF | (Norway) NOR | Tobias Svendsen | 8 | 0 | 1+7 | 0 | 0 | 0 |
| 22 | DF | (Norway) NOR | Alexander Stølås | 34 | 4 | 29 | 4 | 5 | 0 |
| 30 | FW | (Norway) NOR | Dennis Horneland | 1 | 0 | 0 | 0 | 0+1 | 0 |
| 31 | MF | (Norway) NOR | Kristoffer Gunnarshaug | 1 | 0 | 0 | 0 | 1 | 0 |
| 33 | FW | (Norway) NOR | Kristoffer Velde | 14 | 4 | 0+9 | 2 | 2+3 | 2 |
| 34 | FW | (Norway) NOR | Kevin Martin Krygaard | 1 | 0 | 0 | 0 | 0+1 | 0 |
| 35 | MF | (Nigeria) NGA | Anthony Ikedi | 10 | 0 | 0+9 | 0 | 1 | 0 |
| 77 | MF | (Nigeria) NGA | Babajide David | 34 | 9 | 30 | 9 | 4 | 0 |
Players away from Haugesund on loan:
| 17 | FW | (Nigeria) NGA | Shuaibu Ibrahim | 1 | 0 | 0+1 | 0 | 0 | 0 |
Players who left Haugesund during the season:
| 25 | MF | (Cape Verde) CPV | Erin Pinheiro | 1 | 0 | 0 | 0 | 1 | 0 |
| 55 | MF | (Serbia) SRB | Aleksandar Kovačević | 4 | 1 | 0+2 | 0 | 2 | 1 |

=== Goal scorers ===
| Place | Position | Nation | Number | Name | Tippeligaen | Norwegian Cup | Total |
|---|---|---|---|---|---|---|---|
| 1 | MF | (Nigeria) | 77 | Babajide David | 9 | 0 | 9 |
| 2 | FW | (Denmark) | 9 | Frederik Gytkjær | 5 | 3 | 8 |
| 3 | FW | (Senegal) | 17 | Ibrahima Wadji | 6 | 0 | 6 |
| 4 | MF | (Norway) | 7 | Christian Grindheim | 4 | 1 | 5 |
| 5 | DF | (Norway) | 22 | Alexander Stølås | 4 | 0 | 4 |
| 5 | DF | (Norway) | 18 | Vegard Skjerve | 3 | 1 | 4 |
| 5 | FW | (Norway) | 33 | Kristoffer Velde | 2 | 2 | 4 |
| 8 | MF | (Norway) | 14 | Torbjørn Kallevåg | 2 | 0 | 2 |
| 8 | DF | (Ivory Coast) | 3 | Benjamin Karamoko | 2 | 0 | 2 |
| 8 | DF | (Norway) | 4 | Fredrik Pallesen Knudsen | 2 | 0 | 2 |
| 8 | FW | (Mali) | 20 | Ibrahima Koné | 1 | 1 | 2 |
| 8 | | | | Own goal | 2 | 0 | 2 |
| 13 | MF | (Portugal) | 16 | Bruno Leite | 1 | 0 | 1 |
| 13 | DF | (Norway) | 6 | Joakim Våge Nilsen | 1 | 0 | 1 |
| 13 | MF | (Norway) | 8 | Sondre Tronstad | 1 | 0 | 1 |
| 13 | MF | (Serbia) | 55 | Aleksandar Kovačević | 0 | 1 | 1 |
| | | | | TOTALS | 45 | 9 | 54 |

=== Disciplinary record ===
| Number | Nation | Position | Name | Tippeligaen | | Norwegian Cup | | Total | |
| Number | Nation | Position | Name | Booked | Sent off (straight red) | Booked | Sent off (straight red) | Booked | Sent off (straight red) |
|---|---|---|---|---|---|---|---|---|---|
| 3 | (Ivory Coast) | DF | Benjamin Karamoko | 1 | 0 | 0 | 0 | 1 | 0 |
| 4 | (Norway) | DF | Fredrik Pallesen Knudsen | 1 | 0 | 0 | 0 | 1 | 0 |
| 6 | (Norway) | DF | Joakim Våge Nilsen | 1 | 0 | 1 | 0 | 2 | 0 |
| 7 | (Norway) | MF | Christian Grindheim | 1 | 0 | 0 | 0 | 1 | 0 |
| 8 | (Norway) | MF | Sondre Tronstad | 4 | 0 | 1 | 0 | 5 | 0 |
| 9 | (Denmark) | FW | Frederik Gytkjær | 2 | 0 | 0 | 0 | 2 | 0 |
| 12 | (Norway) | GK | Helge Sandvik | 1 | 0 | 0 | 0 | 1 | 0 |
| 14 | (Norway) | MF | Torbjørn Kallevåg | 3 | 0 | 0 | 0 | 3 | 0 |
| 16 | (Portugal) | MF | Bruno Leite | 2 | 0 | 0 | 0 | 2 | 0 |
| 17 | (Senegal) | FW | Ibrahima Wadji | 2 | 0 | 0 | 0 | 2 | 0 |
| 18 | (Norway) | DF | Vegard Skjerve | 2 | 0 | 0 | 0 | 2 | 0 |
| 19 | (Norway) | DF | Kristoffer Haraldseid | 1 | 0 | 0 | 0 | 1 | 0 |
| 20 | (Mali) | FW | Ibrahima Koné | 1 | 0 | 0 | 0 | 1 | 0 |
| 22 | (Norway) | DF | Alexander Stølås | 2 | 0 | 1 | 0 | 3 | 0 |
| 33 | (Norway) | FW | Kristoffer Velde | 2 | 0 | 0 | 0 | 2 | 0 |
| 35 | (Nigeria) | MF | Anthony Ikedi | 1 | 0 | 0 | 0 | 1 | 0 |
| 77 | (Nigeria) | FW | Babajide David | 1 | 0 | 0 | 0 | 1 | 0 |
| | | | TOTALS | 28 | 0 | 3 | 0 | 31 | 0 |
