= 2016 FK Haugesund season =

Haugesund
2016 season
- Chairman: Leif Helge Kaldheim
- Manager: Mark Dempsey (until 14 July); Andrea Loberto (interim) (14 July - 31 October); Eirik Horneland (from 31 October)
- Stadium: Haugesund Stadion
- Tippeligaen: 4th
- Norwegian Cup: Fourth round vs Bodø/Glimt
- Top goalscorer: League: Torbjørn Agdestein (10); All: Torbjørn Agdestein (12)
Home colours	Away colours

The 2016 season was Haugesund's 7th season in the Tippeligaen following their promotion in 2009.

== Season Review ==
Haugesund started the season under the management of Mark Dempsey. Dempsey resigned as manager on 14 July 2016.

== Squad ==
As of 20 July 2016

Note: Flags indicate national team as defined under FIFA eligibility rules; some limited exceptions apply. Players may hold more than one non-FIFA nationality.

No.	Pos.	Nation	Player
1	GK	NOR	Per Kristian Bråtveit
3	DF	SWE	David Myrestam
5	DF	NGR	William Troost-Ekong (on loan from Gent; captain)
6	MF	SVK	Filip Kiss
7	FW	NOR	Liban Abdi
8	MF	NOR	Sondre Tronstad
10	MF	NOR	Roy Miljeteig
11	MF	NOR	Tor Arne Andreassen
12	GK	NOR	Helge Sandvik
13	MF	NOR	Eirik Mæland
14	FW	NOR	Torbjørn Agdestein
15	DF	NGR	Izuchuckwu Anthony

No.	Pos.	Nation	Player
17	FW	NGR	Shuaibu Ibrahim
18	DF	NOR	Vegard Skjerve
19	DF	NOR	Kristoffer Haraldseid
22	MF	NOR	Alexander Stølås
23	MF	BIH	Haris Hajradinović (on loan from Gent)
24	GK	NOR	Herman Fossdal
26	DF	NOR	Sverre Bjørkkjær
28	MF	NOR	Arent-Emil Hauge
29	MF	NOR	Robert Kling
30	FW	NOR	Erling Myklebust
55	DF	SRB	Nemanja Tubić

=== Out on loan ===
Note: Flags indicate national team as defined under FIFA eligibility rules; some limited exceptions apply. Players may hold more than one non-FIFA nationality.

No.	Pos.	Nation	Player
16	MF	GHA	Derrick Mensah (at Karviná)

== Transfers ==
=== Winter ===
In: Note: Flags indicate national team as defined under FIFA eligibility rules; some limited exceptions apply. Players may hold more than one non-FIFA nationality.

No.	Pos.	Nation	Player
4	DF	SRB	Nemanja Tubić (free agent)
8	MF	NOR	Sondre Tronstad (from (England) Huddersfield Town)
10	MF	NOR	Roy Miljeteig (from (Norway) Vard Haugesund)
12	GK	NOR	Helge Sandvik (from (Norway) Vard Haugesund)
15	DF	NGR	Izuchuckwu Anthony (from (Nigeria) Golden Booth Soccer Academy)
16	MF	GHA	Derrick Mensah (from (Czech Republic) Baník Ostrava)
17	FW	NGR	Shuaibu Ibrahim (from (Nigeria) Golden Booth Soccer Academy)
20	FW	GHA	Kwame Karikari (from (Sweden) Halmstad)
23	MF	BIH	Haris Hajradinović (on loan from (Belgium) Gent)

Out: Note: Flags indicate national team as defined under FIFA eligibility rules; some limited exceptions apply. Players may hold more than one non-FIFA nationality.

No.	Pos.	Nation	Player
1	GK	NOR	Per Morten Kristiansen (to (Norway) Fredrikstad)
4	DF	CRO	Mirko Kramarić (to (Bosnia and Herzegovina) Željezničar Sarajevo)
7	FW	DEN	Christian Gytkjær (to (Norway) Rosenborg)
8	MF	NOR	Michael Haukås (to (Norway) Viking)
9	FW	SRB	Nikola Komazec (to (Georgia (country)) Dinamo Batumi)
10	DF	NOR	Joakim Våge Nilsen (to (Norway) Odd)
15	DF	NOR	Martin Bjørnbak (to (Norway) Bodø/Glimt)
16	MF	NGR	Sad'eeq Yusuf (loan return to (Belgium) Genk)
17	MF	DEN	Søren Christensen (to (Croatia) Slaven Belupo)
20	FW	SEN	Simon Diedhiou (to (Belgium) Gent)
21	FW	NGR	Adamu Abubakar (released)
23	MF	BRA	Daniel Bamberg (to (Iceland) Breiðablik)
29	MF	NOR	Robert Kling (on loan to (Norway) Stord)
30	FW	NOR	Erling Flotve Myklebust (on loan to (Norway) Stord)
—	FW	FIN	Roope Riski (to (Finland) SJK Seinäjoki, previously on loan)

=== Summer ===
In: Note: Flags indicate national team as defined under FIFA eligibility rules; some limited exceptions apply. Players may hold more than one non-FIFA nationality.

No.	Pos.	Nation	Player
6	MF	SVK	Filip Kiss (from (Wales) Cardiff City, previously on loan)
7	FW	NOR	Liban Abdi (free agent)

Out: Note: Flags indicate national team as defined under FIFA eligibility rules; some limited exceptions apply. Players may hold more than one non-FIFA nationality.

No.	Pos.	Nation	Player
16	MF	GHA	Derrick Mensah (on loan to (Czech Republic) Karviná, previously on loan to (Croatia) Istra 1961)
20	FW	GHA	Kwame Karikari (to (Ukraine) Stal Kamianske, previously on loan to (Kazakhstan) Irtysh Pavlodar)
50	DF	SRB	Dušan Cvetinović (to Lens, loan made permanent)

== Competitions ==
=== Tippeligaen ===
==== Results summary ====
Overall								Home						Away					
Pld	W	D	L	GF	GA	GD	Pts	W	D	L	GF	GA	GD	W	D	L	GF	GA	GD
30	12	10	8	47	43	+4	46	8	6	1	31	18	+13	4	4	7	16	25	−9

Last updated: 8 November 2016.
Source: See Results

==== Results by round ====
Round	1	2	3	4	5	6	7	8	9	10	11	12	13	14	15	16	17	18	19	20	21	22	23	24	25	26	27	28	29	30
Ground	A	H	A	A	H	A	H	A	H	H	A	H	A	H	A	H	A	H	A	H	A	H	A	H	A	H	A	H	A	H
Result	W	W	L	L	D	W	W	L	D	W	W	D	L	W	D	W	L	L	W	W	D	W	D	D	L	D	L	W	D	D
Position	3	1	4	9	7	5	5	7	7	4	5	5	7	5	6	4	5	6	5	5	4	3	3	4	4	5	5	4	5	4

Updated to match(es) played on 8 November 2016. Source: See Results
A = Away; H = Home; W = Win; D = Draw; L = Loss

==== Results ====
13 March 2016 1	Sarpsborg 08	0–1	Haugesund	Sarpsborg
18:00 CET (UTC+1)		Summary	Mæland (yellow card) 16'; Karikari 82'; Skjerve (yellow card) 89'	Stadium: Sarpsborg Stadion; Attendance: 3,535; Referee: Martin Lundby

19 March 2016 2	Haugesund	3–0	Aalesund	Haugesund
15:30 CET (UTC+1)	Troost-Ekong 9', (yellow card) 28'; Tronstad 38', (yellow card) 73'; Agdestein (yellow card) 54'; Miljeteig (yellow card) 62'; Hajradinović (yellow card) 77'; Karikari 90'	Summary	Arnarson (yellow card) 27'	Stadium: Haugesund Stadion; Attendance: 5,168; Referee: Trond Ivar Døvle

3 April 2016 3	Strømsgodset	2–0	Haugesund	Drammen
20:00 CEST (UTC+2)	Nana 33'; Høiland (yellow card) 53', (penalty missed); Ovenstad (yellow card) 60', (goal) 68'; Pedersen (yellow card) 90'	Summary	Kiss (yellow card) 20' (yellow-red card) 28'; Tubić (yellow card) 42'; Troost-Ekong (yellow card) 64'; Hajradinović (red card) 81'	Stadium: Marienlyst Stadion; Attendance: 6,095; Referee: Ken Andre Johnsen

8 April 2016 4	Sogndal	1–0	Haugesund	Sogndalsfjøra
19:00 CEST (UTC+2)	Otoo 33'	Summary	Tubić (yellow card) 29'; Skjerve (yellow card) 40'	Stadium: Fosshaugane Campus; Attendance: 2,753; Referee: Tore Hansen

15 April 2016 5	Haugesund	2–2	Lillestrøm	Haugesund
19:00 CEST (UTC+2)	Mæland 10'; Agdestein 52'; Kiss (yellow card) 79'; Anthony (yellow card) 87'	Summary	Mikalsen 34'; Friday 80'; Jradi (yellow card) 90+1'	Stadium: Haugesund Stadion; Attendance: 4,475; Referee: Ola Hobber Nilsen

20 April 2016 6	Bodø/Glimt	3–4	Haugesund	Bodø
19:00 CEST (UTC+2)	Olsen 19'; Azemi 45+1', 59' (pen.); Babenko (yellow card) 81'	Summary	Agdestein 12', 21'; Bråtveit (yellow card) 64'; Mensah (yellow card) 67'; Kiss 77' (pen.); Stølås 90+2'	Stadium: Aspmyra Stadion; Attendance: 2,867; Referee: Trygve Kjensli

25 April 2016 7	Haugesund	3–1	Stabæk	Haugesund
19:00 CEST (UTC+2)	Haraldseid (yellow card) 3'; Miljeteig 40'; Tronstad 51'; Kiss 75'	Summary	Issah (yellow card) 5'; Kassi 72'	Stadium: Haugesund Stadion; Attendance: 4,438; Referee: Tommy Skjerven

1 May 2016 8	Viking	3–2	Haugesund	Stavanger
15:30 CEST (UTC+2)	Bringaker 35'; Adegbenro (yellow card) 54'; Abdullahi 71', 73'; Ibrahim (yellow card) 84'; Mets (yellow card) 90+6'	Summary	Agdestein 14', 86'; Kiss (yellow card) 22'; Skjerve (yellow card) 36'; Tronstad (yellow card) 78'; Troost-Ekong (yellow card) 90'	Stadium: Viking Stadion; Attendance: 9,032; Referee: Tore Hansen

8 May 2016 9	Haugesund	3–3	Molde	Haugesund
20:00 CEST (UTC+2)	Stølås (yellow card) 25'; Andreassen 77'; Kiss 85' (pen.), 89'; Hajradinović (yellow card) 90+1'	Summary	Hestad 20'; Amang (yellow card) 44'; Strand 48'; Gulbrandsen 76'; Horvath (red card) 82'	Stadium: Haugesund Stadion; Attendance: 4,784; Referee: Martin Lundby

11 May 2016 10	Haugesund	3–1	Odd	Haugesund
18:00 CEST (UTC+2)	Agdestein 9'; Hajradinović 27', 31'	Summary	Berge 21'; Eriksen (yellow card) 65'; Jensen (yellow card) 69'	Stadium: Haugesund Stadion; Attendance: 4,081; Referee: Kai Erik Steen

16 May 2016 11	Vålerenga	0–1	Haugesund	Oslo
18:00 CEST (UTC+2)	Zahid (yellow card) 65'; Wæhler (yellow card) 67'; Jääger (yellow card) 69'	Summary	Ibrahim 18'; Stølås (yellow card) 60'; Skjerve (yellow card) 80'	Stadium: Ullevaal Stadion; Attendance: 9,164; Referee: Kim Andre Johnsen

22 May 2016 12	Haugesund	1–1	Rosenborg	Haugesund
18:00 CEST (UTC+2)	Ibrahim 16'; Stølås (yellow card) 90'	Summary	Konradsen 31'	Stadium: Haugesund Stadion; Attendance: 7,722; Referee: Trygve Kjensli

29 May 2016 13	Brann	1–0	Haugesund	Bergen
18:00 CEST (UTC+2)	Haugen (yellow card) 25'; Braaten (yellow card) 42'; Skålevik 50'; Leciejewski (yellow card) 90+2'	Summary		Stadium: Brann Stadion; Attendance: 11,011; Referee: Svein Erik Edvartsen

2 July 2016 14	Haugesund	2–1	Start	Haugesund
15:30 CEST (UTC+2)	Skjerve 49'; Miljeteig 67'	Summary	Rasmussen 15'	Stadium: Haugesund Stadion; Attendance: 5,106; Referee: Ola Hobber Nilsen

9 July 2016 15	Tromsø	2–2	Haugesund	Tromsø
18:00 CEST (UTC+2)	Ingebrigtsen 44'; Gundersen 83' (yellow card) 89'	Summary	Miljeteig 22'; Agdestein 71'; Ibrahim (yellow card) 75'	Stadium: Alfheim Stadion; Attendance: 3,118; Referee: Trygve Kjensli

16 July 2016 16	Haugesund	4–1	Viking	Haugesund
15:30 CEST (UTC+2)	Agdestein 16'; Hajradinović (yellow card) 39'; Kiss (yellow card) 56'; Stølås 70', 76' (yellow card) 74'; Abdi 86'	Summary	Haukås 12'; Pedersen (yellow card) 23'; Ibrahim (yellow card) 54'; Mets (yellow card) 62'	Stadium: Haugesund Stadion; Attendance: 6,077; Referee: Tore Hansen

23 July 2016 17	Rosenborg	6–0	Haugesund	Trondheim
15:30 CEST (UTC+2)	Gytkjær 17'; Stølås 48' (o.g.); Vilhjálmsson 52', 59'; Bakenga 76', 89'	[ Summary]	Stølås (yellow card) 39'	Stadium: Lerkendal Stadion; Attendance: 16,901; Referee: Martin Lundby

31 July 2016 18	Haugesund	0–1	Sogndal	Haugesund
18:00 CEST (UTC+2)	Skjerve (yellow card) 66'; Tronstad (yellow card) 90+1'	Summary	Sveen 55'; Kjemhus (yellow card) 63'; Koomson (yellow card) 72'	Stadium: Haugesund Stadion; Attendance: 4,432; Referee: Tom Harald Hagen

7 August 2016 19	Stabæk	0–1	Haugesund	Bærum
15:30 CEST (UTC+2)	Kassi (yellow card) 90+2'	Summary	Agdestein 30'; Kiss (yellow card) 89'; Stølås (yellow card) 90+2'	Stadium: Nadderud Stadion; Attendance: 3,344; Referee: Kai Erik Steen

14 August 2016 20	Haugesund	2–1	Tromsø	Haugesund
18:00 CEST (UTC+2)	Stølås 14'; Olsen 89' (o.g.)	Summary	Landu (yellow card) 7'; Ødegaard (red card) 73'; Gundersen 83'; Antonsen (yellow card) 84'; Jenssen (yellow card) 90+4'	Stadium: Haugesund Stadion; Attendance: 4,347; Referee: Trygve Kjensli

20 August 2016 21	Lillestrøm	1–1	Haugesund	Kjeller
15:30 CEST (UTC+2)	Innocent (yellow card) 43'; Rindarøy (yellow card) 89'; Martin 90+2'	Summary	Myrestam 40'; Haraldseid (yellow card) 46'; Abdi (yellow card) 54'; Kiss (yellow card) 56'	Stadium: Åråsen Stadion; Attendance: 4,756; Referee: Tom Harald Hagen

27 August 2016 22	Haugesund	3–2	Brann	Haugesund
18:00 CEST (UTC+2)	Hajradinović 36' (pen.) (yellow card) 49'; Troost-Ekong 45+1'; Haraldseid 81'	Summary	Barmen 28' (yellow card) 45'; Skålevik 30' (yellow card) 60'; Nilsen (yellow card) 35'; Demidov (yellow card) 90+2'; Kristiansen (yellow card) 90+3'	Stadium: Haugesund Stadion; Attendance: 7,130; Referee: Trond Ivar Døvle

11 September 2016 23	Molde	0–0	Haugesund	Molde
20:00 CEST (UTC+2)		Summary	Hajradinović (yellow card) 25'; Tubić (yellow card) 54' (yellow-red card) 80'	Stadium: Aker Stadion; Attendance: 7,459; Referee: Tore Hansen

16 September 2016 24	Haugesund	1–1	Vålerenga	Haugesund
19:00 CEST (UTC+2)	Stølås 31'	Summary	Nakkim (yellow card) 57'; Zahid 75' (yellow card) 78'	Stadium: Haugesund Stadion; Attendance: 5,330; Referee: Tommy Skjerven

25 September 2016 25	Start	1–0	Haugesund	Kristiansand
18:00 CEST (UTC+2)	Skogmo (yellow card) 66'; Antwi (yellow card) 72'; Sigurdsen 83'	Summary		Stadium: Sør Arena; Attendance: 4,150; Referee: Trygve Kjensli

2 October 2016 26	Haugesund	1–1	Sarpsborg 08	Haugesund
15:30 CEST (UTC+2)	Kiss (yellow card) 33' (goal) 75' (pen.); Troost-Ekong (yellow card) 55'; Abdi (yellow card) 87'	Summary	Ernemann 64'; Kirkevold (yellow card) 67'	Stadium: Haugesund Stadion; Attendance: 4,411; Referee: Espen Eskås

16 October 2016 27	Odd	2–1	Haugesund	Skien
18:00 CEST (UTC+2)	Occéan 31'; Nordkvelle 34' (pen.)	Summary	Skjerve 77'; Hajradinović (yellow card) 89'	Stadium: Skagerak Arena; Attendance: 7,512; Referee: Dag Vidar Hafsås

23 October 2016 28	Haugesund	2–1	Bodø/Glimt	Haugesund
18:00 CEST (UTC+2)	Tubić (yellow card) 9'; Troost-Ekong 35'; Kiss 56'	Summary	Azemi 44'	Stadium: Haugesund Stadion; Attendance: 4,302; Referee: Ola Hobber Nilsen

30 October 2016 29	Aalesund	3–3	Haugesund	Ålesund
18:00 CET (UTC+1)	Mos 28' (pen.), 57'; Larsen 72'; Wormgoor (yellow card) 90'	Summary	Agdestein 21'; Skjerve 30'; Troost-Ekong (yellow card) 38'; Kiss (yellow card) 56'; Hajradinović 78'	Stadium: Color Line Stadion; Attendance: 7,095; Referee: Martin Lundby

6 November 2016 30	Haugesund	1–1	Strømsgodset	Haugesund
18:00 CEST (UTC+2)	Abdi 26'	Summary	Kiss 31' (o.g.); Vilsvik (yellow card) 33'; Madsen (yellow card) 54'; Glesnes (yellow card) 55'	Stadium: Haugesund Stadion; Attendance: 6,380; Referee: Kai Erik Steen

==== Table ====
Pos	Team	Pld	W	D	L	GF	GA	GD	Pts	Qualification or relegation
2	Brann	30	16	6	8	42	27	+15	54	Qualification for the Europa League second qualifying round
3	Odd	30	15	6	9	44	35	+9	51	Qualification for the Europa League first qualifying round
4	Haugesund	30	12	10	8	47	43	+4	46	Qualification for the Europa League first qualifying round
5	Molde	30	13	6	11	48	42	+6	45	
6	Sarpsborg 08	30	12	9	9	35	37	−2	45	

Source: Football Association of Norway (in Norwegian), Soccerway
Rules for classification: 1) Points; 2) Goal difference; 3) Goals scored; 4) Head-to-head points; 5) Head-to-head goal difference; 6) Head-to-head away goals scored (between two teams).

=== Norwegian Cup ===
12 April 2016 First Round	Stord Sunnhordland	1–8	Haugesund	Stord
17:00 CEST (UTC+2)	S.Coarse 32'; A.Njøs (yellow card) 63' (yellow-red card) 72'; J.Skard (yellow card) 83'	Summary	Kiss 10'; Troost-Ekong 38'; Mensah 59'; Ibrahim 73', 83'; Karikari 77', 88'; M.Granheim 87' (o.g.)	Stadium: Vikahaugane Kunstgress; Attendance: 1,250; Referee: Svein Tore Sinnes

28 April 2016 Second Round	Varegg	2–4	Haugesund	Sandviken
18:00 CEST (UTC+2)	K. Valsvik 10' (pen.); T. Aabrekk (yellow card) 33'; E. Anfinsen 54'; T. Ulvestad (yellow card) 90'	Summary	Andreassen (yellow card) 34', (goal) 45+1'; Hajradinović (yellow card) 39'; Ibrahim 44'; Karikari 75'; Kiss 89'	Stadium: Stemmemyren Idrettsplass; Referee: Anders Bjerk Hansen

4 May 2016 Third Round	Åsane	1–4	Haugesund	Åsane
18:00 CEST (UTC+2)	Herrem 20'; F. Knudsen (red card) 24'; S. Hagos (yellow card) 84'	Summary	Kiss 25' (pen.); Karikari 29', 50'; Agdestein 42'	Stadium: Myrdal Gress; Attendance: 368; Referee: Ola Hobber Nilsen

25 May 2016 Fourth Round	Bodø/Glimt	3–3 (a.e.t.) (7–6 p)	Haugesund	Bodø
18:00 CEST (UTC+2)	Normann 48'; Jacobsen (yellow card) 52'; Azemi 84' (yellow card) 87'; Furebotn 101'	Report	Mæland 81', 99'; Agdestein 88'; Anthony (yellow card) 92'	Stadium: Aspmyra Stadion; Attendance: 942; Referee: Ola Hobber Nilsen
	Penalties
	Babenko (penalty scored); Jevtović (penalty scored); Bjørnbak (penalty scored); Saltnes (penalty scored); Olsen (penalty missed); Hauge (penalty scored); Furebotn (penalty scored); Jacobsen (penalty scored)		(penalty scored) Kiss; (penalty scored) Agdestein; (penalty scored) Mæland; (penalty missed) Tronstad; (penalty missed) Hajradinović; (penalty scored) Stølås; (penalty scored) Skjerve; (penalty missed) Bjørkkjær

== Squad statistics ==
As of match played 6 November 2016

=== Appearances and goals ===
No.	Pos	Nat	Player	Total		Tippeligaen		Norwegian Cup	
No.	Pos	Nat	Player	Apps	Goals	Apps	Goals	Apps	Goals
1	GK	(Norway) NOR	Per Kristian Bråtveit	24	0	23	0	1	0
3	DF	(Sweden) SWE	David Myrestam	32	1	29+1	1	1+1	0
5	DF	(Nigeria) NGR	William Troost-Ekong	28	4	24	3	4	1
6	MF	(Slovakia) SVK	Filip Kiss	31	9	27	6	3+1	3
7	FW	(Norway) NOR	Liban Abdi	14	2	7+7	2	0	0
8	MF	(Norway) NOR	Sondre Tronstad	26	2	19+4	2	2+1	0
10	MF	(Norway) NOR	Roy Miljeteig	19	3	12+6	3	1	0
11	MF	(Norway) NOR	Tor Arne Andreassen	14	2	7+5	1	2	1
12	GK	(Norway) NOR	Helge Sandvik	10	0	7	0	3	0
13	MF	(Norway) NOR	Eirik Mæland	19	3	16+2	1	0+1	2
14	FW	(Norway) NOR	Torbjørn Agdestein	32	12	25+5	10	1+1	2
15	DF	(Nigeria) NGR	Izuchuckwu Anthony	18	0	11+3	0	2+2	0
17	FW	(Nigeria) NGR	Shuaibu Ibrahim	20	5	8+9	2	3	3
18	DF	(Norway) NOR	Vegard Skjerve	29	3	26	3	2+1	0
19	DF	(Norway) NOR	Kristoffer Haraldseid	28	2	25	2	2+1	0
21	FW	(Norway) NOR	Erling Myklebust	5	0	0+5	0	0	0
22	MF	(Norway) NOR	Alexander Stølås	31	5	26+2	5	3	0
23	MF	(Bosnia and Herzegovina) BIH	Haris Hajradinović	31	4	21+6	4	4	0
26	DF	(Norway) NOR	Sverre Bjørkkjær	5	0	1+1	0	3	0
28	MF	(Norway) NOR	Arent-Emil Hauge	2	0	0	0	1+1	0
29	MF	(Norway) NOR	Robert Kling	8	0	1+5	0	1+1	0
36	FW	(Norway) NOR	Eirik Baugstø	1	0	0	0	0+1	0
55	DF	(Serbia) SRB	Nemanja Tubić	12	0	12	0	0	0
Players away from Haugesund on loan:
16	MF	(Ghana) GHA	Derrick Mensah	6	1	2+2	0	2	1
Players who appeared for Haugesund no longer at the club:
20	FW	(Ghana) GHA	Kwame Karikari	16	7	2+11	2	3	5

=== Goal scorers ===
Place	Position	Nation	Number	Name	Tippeligaen	Norwegian Cup	Total
1	FW	(Norway)	14	Torbjørn Agdestein	10	2	12
2	MF	(Slovakia)	6	Filip Kiss	6	3	9
3	FW	(Ghana)	20	Kwame Karikari	2	5	7
4	FW	(Norway)	22	Alexander Stølås	5	0	5
4	FW	(Nigeria)	17	Shuaibu Ibrahim	2	3	5
6	FW	(Bosnia and Herzegovina)	23	Haris Hajradinović	4	0	4
6	DF	(Nigeria)	5	William Troost-Ekong	3	1	4
8	MF	(Norway)	10	Roy Miljeteig	3	0	3
8	DF	(Norway)	18	Vegard Skjerve	3	0	3
8	MF	(Norway)	13	Eirik Mæland	1	2	3
11	MF	(Norway)	8	Sondre Tronstad	2	0	2
11	FW	(Norway)	7	Liban Abdi	2	0	2
11	DF	(Norway)	19	Kristoffer Haraldseid	2	0	2
11	MF	(Norway)	11	Tor Arne Andreassen	1	1	2
15	DF	(Sweden)	3	David Myrestam	1	0	1
15	MF	(Ghana)	16	Derrick Mensah	0	1	1
15				Own goal	0	1	1
				TOTALS	47	19	66

=== Disciplinary record ===
Number	Nation	Position	Name	Tippeligaen		Norwegian Cup		Total	
Number	Nation	Position	Name	Yellow card	Red card	Yellow card	Red card	Yellow card	Red card
1	(Norway)	GK	Per Kristian Bråtveit	1	0	0	0	1	0
5	(Nigeria)	DF	William Troost-Ekong	5	0	0	0	5	0
6	(Slovakia)	MF	Filip Kiss	6	1	0	0	6	1
7	(Norway)	FW	Liban Abdi	2	0	0	0	2	0
8	(Norway)	MF	Sondre Tronstad	3	0	0	0	3	0
10	(Norway)	MF	Roy Miljeteig	1	0	0	0	1	0
11	(Norway)	MF	Tor Arne Andreassen	0	0	1	0	1	0
13	(Norway)	MF	Eirik Mæland	1	0	0	0	1	0
14	(Norway)	FW	Torbjørn Agdestein	1	0	0	0	1	0
15	(Nigeria)	DF	Izuchuckwu Anthony	1	0	1	0	2	0
16	(Ghana)	MF	Derrick Mensah	2	0	0	0	2	0
17	(Nigeria)	FW	Shuaibu Ibrahim	1	0	0	0	1	0
18	(Norway)	DF	Vegard Skjerve	6	0	0	0	6	0
19	(Norway)	DF	Kristoffer Haraldseid	2	0	0	0	2	0
22	(Norway)	MF	Alexander Stølås	6	0	0	0	6	0
23	(Bosnia and Herzegovina)	MF	Haris Hajradinović	6	1	1	0	7	1
55	(Serbia)	DF	Nemanja Tubić	5	1	0	0	5	1
			TOTALS	49	2	3	0	52	2
