= Gytkjær =

Gytkjær is a Danish surname. Notable people with the surname include:

- Christian Gytkjær (born 1990), Danish footballer
- Frederik Gytkjær (born 1993), Danish footballer
