= Ikedi =

Ikedi can be a masculine given name or a surname. Notable people with the name include:

- Ikedi Ohakim, Nigerian politician
- Anthony Ikedi (born 1998), Nigerian footballer
