= Izuchukwu Anthony =

Nigerian footballer

Personal information
- Full name: Izuchukwu Jude Anthony
- Date of birth: 3 November 1997 (age 29)
- Place of birth: Abia State, Nigeria
- Height: 1.87 m (6 ft 2 in)
- Position: Centre back

Team information
- Current team: Akritas Chlorakas
- Number: 16

Youth career
- GBS Academy

Senior career*
Years	Team	Apps	(Gls)
2016–2018	Haugesund	15	(0)
2018	→ Jerv (loan)	6	(1)
2019	Nest-Sotra	26	(1)
2020–2021	Spartak Trnava	32	(0)
2021–2022	Hapoel Haifa	26	(0)
2022–2023	Al-Khaleej	23	(0)
2023–2024	Radnički Kragujevac	7	(0)
2024	Nantong Zhiyun	28	(3)
2025–	Akritas Chlorakas	24	(0)

International career^{‡}
2019	Nigeria U23	3	(0)
2021–	Nigeria	1	(0)
- * Club domestic league appearances and goals as of 14 June 2026 ‡ National team caps and goals as of 8 June 2021

Izuchukwu Jude Anthony (born 3 November 1997) is a Nigerian professional footballer who plays as a centre-back for Cypriot First Division club Akritas Chlorakas.

== Club career ==
On 30 January 2016, Anthony signed a three-year contract with Haugesund.

On 20 August 2022, Anthony joined Saudi Arabian club Al-Khaleej on a one-year deal.

On 20 January 2024, Anthony signed with Chinese Super League club Nantong Zhiyun.

== Career statistics ==
As of match played 20 December 2025

Appearances and goals by club, season and competition
Club	Season	League			National Cup		Continental		Total	
Club	Season	Division	Apps	Goals	Apps	Goals	Apps	Goals	Apps	Goals
Haugesund	2016	Eliteserien	14	0	4	0	—		18	0
Haugesund	2017	Eliteserien	1	0	0	0	0	0	1	0
Haugesund	2018	Eliteserien	0	0	0	0	0	0	0	0
Haugesund	Total		15	0	4	0	0	0	19	0
Jerv (loan)	2018	1. divisjon	6	1	1	0	—		7	1
Nest-Sotra	2019	1. divisjon	26	1	3	0	—		29	1
Spartak Trnava	2019–20	Slovak First Football League	11	0	0	0	—		11	0
Spartak Trnava	2020–21	Slovak First Football League	18	0	0	0	—		18	0
Spartak Trnava	2021–22	Slovak First Football League	3	0	0	0	—		3	0
Spartak Trnava	Total		32	0	0	0	—		32	0
Hapoel Haifa	2021–22	Israeli Premier League	26	0	3	0	—		29	0
Al-Khaleej	2022–23	Saudi Pro League	23	0	1	0	—		24	0
Radnički Kragujevac	2023–24	Serbian SuperLiga	7	0	1	0	—		8	0
Nantong Zhiyun	2024	Chinese Super League	28	3	1	0	—		29	3
Akritas Chlorakas	2025–26	Cypriot First Division	15	0	1	0	—		16	0
Career Total			178	5	15	0	0	0	193	5
