= Per Kristian Bråtveit =

Norwegian footballer (born 1996)

Personal information
- Full name: Per Kristian Worre Bråtveit
- Date of birth: 15 February 1996 (age 30)
- Place of birth: Haugesund, Norway
- Height: 1.87 m (6 ft 2 in)
- Position: Goalkeeper

Team information
- Current team: Haugesund
- Number: 1

Youth career
- Randaberg
- Djerv 1919
- Haugesund

Senior career*
Years	Team	Apps	(Gls)
2012–2018	Haugesund	107	(0)
2019–2022	Djurgårdens IF	28	(0)
2021	→ Groningen (loan)	0	(0)
2021–2022	→ Nîmes (loan)	30	(0)
2022	Vålerenga	0	(0)
2022–2023	AGF	0	(0)
2023	Odd	13	(0)
2024–2025	Strømsgodset	55	(0)
2026	Aberdeen	5	(0)
2026–	Haugesund	3	(0)

International career^{‡}
2011–2012	Norway U15	1	(0)
2012–2013	Norway U16	6	(0)
2013–2014	Norway U17	7	(0)
2014	Norway U18	2	(0)
2014	Norway U19	1	(0)
2014–2018	Norway U21	9	(0)
2020	Norway	1	(0)
- * Club domestic league appearances and goals as of 14 November 2026 ‡ National team caps and goals as of 18 November 2020

Per Kristian Worre Bråtveit (born 15 February 1996) is a Norwegian professional footballer who plays as a goalkeeper. He currently plays for Haugesund.

== Club career ==
=== Early career ===
In his youth, Bråtveit spent time with SK Djerv before moving to Haugesund.

=== Haugesund ===
He made his senior debut for Haugesund on 9 June 2014 against Strømsgodset; Haugesund lost 2–1.

=== Djurgården ===
On 19 December 2018, he signed for Djurgårdens IF. He made his debut in the first game of the 2019 season against GIF Sundsvall on 1 April.

== Career statistics ==
=== Club ===
As of 14 November 2026

Appearances and goals by club, season and competition
Club	Season	League			National Cup (Note: Includes Norwegian Cup, Svenska Cupen, Coupe de France)		Continental		Total	
Club	Season	Division	Apps	Goals	Apps	Goals	Apps	Goals	Apps	Goals
Haugesund	2014	Tippeligaen	5	0	4	0	3 (Note: Appearances in UEFA Europa League)	0	12	0
Haugesund	2015	Tippeligaen	27	0	1	0	—		28	0
Haugesund	2016	Tippeligaen	23	0	1	0	—		24	0
Haugesund	2017	Eliteserien	28	0	1	0	2	0	31	0
Haugesund	2018	Eliteserien	24	0	3	0	—		27	0
Haugesund	Total		107	0	10	0	5	0	122	0
Djurgården	2019	Allsvenskan	10	0	6	0	—		16	0
Djurgården	2020	Allsvenskan	18	0	0	0	3 (Note: One appearance in UEFA Champions League, two appearances in UEFA Europa League)	0	21	0
Djurgården	Total		28	0	6	0	3	0	37	0
Groningen (loan)	2020–21	Eredivisie	0	0	0	0	—		0	0
Nîmes (loan)	2021–22	Ligue 2	30	0	1	0	—		31	0
Vålerenga	2022	Eliteserien	0	0	0	0	—		0	0
Vålerenga	Total		0	0	0	0	—		0	0
AGF	2022–23	Danish Superliga	0	0	0	0	—		0	0
AGF	Total		0	0	0	0	—		0	0
Odd	2023	Eliteserien	13	0	0	0	—		13	0
Odd	Total		13	0	0	0	—		13	0
Strømsgodset	2024	Eliteserien	30	0	2	0	—		32	0
Strømsgodset	2025	Eliteserien	25	0	1	0	—		26	0
Strømsgodset	Total		55	0	3	0	—		58	0
Aberdeen	2025–26	Scottish Premiership	5	0	1	0	—		6	0
Haugesund	2026	OBOS-ligaen	3	0	0	0	—		3	0
Career total			241	0	21	0	8	0	270	0

== Honours ==
Djurgårdens IF

- Allsvenskan: 2019
