= Ibrahima Wadji =

Senegalese footballer (born 1995)

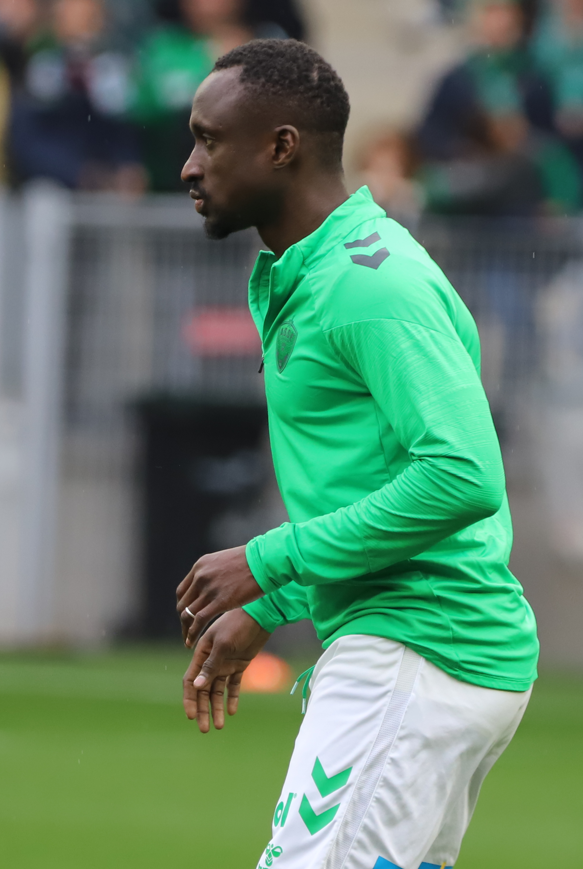
- Wadji with Saint-Étienne in 2025

Personal information
- Date of birth: 5 May 1995 (age 31)
- Place of birth: Bignona, Senegal
- Height: 1.75 m (5 ft 9 in)
- Position: Forward

Team information
- Current team: Turan Tovuz
- Number: 99

Senior career*
Years	Team	Apps	(Gls)
2016	Mbour Petite-Côte		
2016‐2017	Gazişehir Gaziantep	28	(1)
2017–2018	Molde	13	(2)
2018	→ Haugesund (loan)	12	(6)
2019–2021	Haugesund	43	(19)
2021–2022	Qarabağ	16	(11)
2022–2025	Saint-Étienne	49	(12)
2025–	Turan Tovuz	25	(2)
- * Club domestic league appearances and goals as of 22 June 2026

Ibrahima Wadji (born 5 May 1995) is a Senegalese professional footballer who plays as a forward for Azerbaijan Premier League club Turan Tovuz.

== Career ==
On 8 August 2017, Wadji joined Molde from Gazişehir Gaziantep.

In July 2018, Wadji joined Haugesund on loan from Molde until the end of the 2018 season, with an opportunity to join Haugesund permanently at the end of the loan. On 4 December 2018, Haugesund confirmed the permanent signing of Wadji on a contract until the end of 2021.

On 21 June 2019, Haugesund confirmed that Wadji had tested positive for Morphine in an anti-doping test after their match against Kristiansund on 19 May 2019.

On 18 August 2021, Wadji signed for Qarabağ on a three-year contract.

On 30 August 2022, Qarabağ announced that Wadji had been sold to Saint-Étienne. He signed a three-year contract. On 2 June 2024, he scored an extra-time goal in a 2–2 away draw against Metz in the relegation play-offs second leg, securing his club's promotion to Ligue 1 by winning 4–3 on aggregate.

On 31 July 2025, Wadji signed for Azerbaijani club Turan Tovuz on a one-year contract with an option for a second year.

== Career statistics ==
As of match played 21 April 2026

Appearances and goals by club, season and competition
Club	Season	League			Cup		Continental		Total	
Club	Season	Division	Apps	Goals	Apps	Goals	Apps	Goals	Apps	Goals
Gazişehir Gaziantep	2015–16	TFF First League	11	1	0	0	—		11	1
Gazişehir Gaziantep	2016–17	TFF First League	17	0	2	0	—		19	0
Gazişehir Gaziantep	Total		28	1	2	0	—		30	1
Molde	2017	Eliteserien	9	1	1	0	—		10	1
Molde	2018	Eliteserien	4	1	2	2	1 (Note: Appearance(s) in the UEFA Europa League)	0	7	3
Molde	Total		13	2	3	2	1	0	17	4
Haugesund (loan)	2018	Eliteserien	12	6	1	0	—		13	6
Haugesund	2019	Eliteserien	10	4	1	1	—		11	5
Haugesund	2020	Eliteserien	20	7	0	0	—		20	7
Haugesund	2021	Eliteserien	13	8	0	0	—		13	8
Haugesund	Total		43	19	1	1	—		44	20
Qarabağ	2021–22	Azerbaijan Premier League	16	11	4	4	8 (Note: Appearances in the UEFA Europa Conference League)	1	28	16
Qarabağ	2022–23	Azerbaijan Premier League	0	0	0	0	8 (Note: Appearances in the UEFA Champions League)	4	8	4
Qarabağ	Total		16	11	4	4	16	5	36	20
Saint-Étienne	2022–23	Ligue 2	30	12	1	0	—		31	12
Saint-Étienne	2023–24	Ligue 2	9	0	0	0	1 (Note: Appearance in the Ligue 1 relegation/promotion play-offs)	1	10	1
Saint-Étienne	2024–25	Ligue 1	10	0	0	0	0	0	10	0
Saint-Étienne	Total		49	12	1	0	1	1	51	13
Turan Tovuz	2025–26	Azerbaijan Premier League	20	1	5	2	—		25	3
Career total			181	53	17	9	18	6	216	67
