= Erin Pinheiro =

Cape Verdean footballer (born 1997)

Erin Gomes Pinheiro
Personal information
- Full name: Erin Jorge Gomes Pinheiro
- Date of birth: 15 July 1997 (age 29)
- Place of birth: São Vicente, Cape Verde
- Height: 1.90 m (6 ft 3 in)
- Position: Midfielder

Team information
- Current team: Atlético CP
- Number: 22

Youth career
- –2015: Saint-Étienne

Senior career*
Years	Team	Apps	(Gls)
2015–2017	Saint-Étienne II	22	(1)
2015–2018	Saint-Étienne	2	(0)
2018	→ Haugesund (loan)	0	(0)
2020–2021	Batuque		
2022–2024	Derby		
2024–	Atlético CP	23	(0)
- * Club domestic league appearances and goals as of 25 June 2025

Erin Gomes Pinheiro (born 15 July 1997) is a Cape Verdean footballer who plays as a midfielder for Portuguese side Atlético CP.

== Club career ==
Pinheiro is a youth exponent from Saint-Étienne. He made his Ligue 1 debut on 28 October 2015 against Paris Saint-Germain replacing Fabien Lemoine after 74 minutes in a 4–1 home win.

Pinheiro joined FK Haugesund on loan on the last day of the Norwegian transfer window, playing in their 2018 Norwegian Cup first round match against Skjold before the loan was terminated early on 10 May 2018.
