= Frederik Gytkjær =

Danish footballer (born 1993)

Personal information
- Full name: Frederik Lund Gytkjær
- Date of birth: 16 March 1993 (age 33)
- Place of birth: Roskilde, Denmark
- Height: 1.80 m (5 ft 11 in)
- Position: Striker

Team information
- Current team: Lyngby
- Number: 26

Youth career
- 1998–2001: Jyllinge FC
- 2001–2004: Ølstykke FC
- 2004–2012: Lyngby

Senior career*
Years	Team	Apps	(Gls)
2012–2016	Lyngby	90	(23)
2017–2018	Haugesund	41	(11)
2019–	Lyngby	170	(52)

International career
2008–2009	Denmark U16	2	(2)
2008–2010	Denmark U17	15	(2)
2010–2011	Denmark U18	10	(3)
2012	Denmark U20	1	(0)
- * Club domestic league appearances and goals as of 11:48, 13 September 2026 (UTC)

Frederik Lund Gytkjær (Danish pronunciation: [ˈkytˌkʰeˀɐ̯]; born 16 March 1993) is a Danish professional footballer who plays for Danish Superliga club Lyngby Boldklub.

A versatile player, Gytkjær has both played as a forward and as a midfielder throughout his career. Besides playing for Lyngby, he has also played two seasons for Norwegian club Haugesund. Between 2008 and 2012, Gytkjær represented Denmark at four levels.

== Club career ==
=== Lyngby ===
==== 1998–12: Youth career ====
Gytkjær played for local clubs Jyllinge FC and Ølstykke FC before joining the academy of Lyngby Boldklub in 2004. There, he was described as "one of the best Danish players born in 1993", according to Niels Frederiksen who was then in charge of Lyngby's academy. In 2009, at the age of sixteen, he joined the Hamburger SV academy for a trial, before returning the Lyngby where he signed a contract extension the following year.

==== 2012–16: First team ====
Gytkjær was promoted to the Lyngby first team in the summer of 2012 alongside fellow academy players, among other Uffe Bech who would go on to play for Hannover 96 and Panathinaikos later in his career. Gytkjær made his first team-debut on 18 November 2012, coming on as a substitute for Fanol Përdedaj in the 89th minute of a 1–1 draw home against AB. He ended the season with no goals in 9 appearances.

The following season, Gytkjær started playing more regularly during Lyngby's 2013–14 campaign in the Danish second tier, which ended in third place. At the end of the season, he signed a one-year contract extension with the club, after finishing the season with three goals in 28 total appearances.

Gytkjær started to score more goals during the next two seasons in the Danish second tier, with a notable climax on 24 September 2014, where he scored six goals in a Danish Cup matchup against Kalundborg GB which ended in a 10–0 win for Lyngby. During these two seasons, ending in promotion to the Danish Superliga, Gytkjær scored 20 goals in 45 league appearances, marking a more offensive role for the midfielder.

=== Haugesund ===
After half a season in the Superliga, Gytkjær signed a three-and-a-half-year contract with Norwegian club Haugesund on 7 December 2016. He made his debut against Strømsgodset on 2 April 2017, the first match of the 2017 Eliteserien season, scoring his first goal after just 19 seconds in a 3–1 loss for Haugesund. The following week he scored a brace in a 4–3 win over Vålerenga. On 6 July, Gytkjær made his European debut starting in a 0–0 away draw against Northern Irish club Coleraine in the first qualifying round of the 2017–18 Europa League. After advancing 7–0 on aggregate, Haugesund drew Polish club Lech Poznań in the second round, meaning a matchup between Gytkjær and his brother, Christian. Gytkjær and Haugesund would go on to lose 4–3 on aggregate, after beating Lech Poznań 3–2 at home in the first matchup. He finished the season with 29 total appearances, in which he scored six goals.

The following season, Gytkjær saw less playing time and on 30 November 2018, he was released by Haugesund a year before the expiration of his contract making him a free agent. He made a total of 49 appearances for the club in which he scored 14 goals.

=== Return to Lyngby ===
On 15 January 2019, Gytkjær agreed a transfer to his former club Lyngby. He signed a one-and-a-half-year deal with De Kongeblå. His return was praised by director of football, Birger Jørgensen, who called him a "local hero". Gytkjær made his first appearance since his return to the club on 3 March in a 1–0 win over Hvidovre IF, and scored his first goal from a free-kick on 21 April in a 3–0 win over Nykøbing FC in the Danish second tier. His first season after returning to Lyngby resulted in promotion to the Danish Superliga.

He suffered relegation to the Danish 1st Division again with the club on 9 May 2021 after a loss to last placed AC Horsens.

On 1 September 2021, Gytkjær scored four goals in a 5–1 win over Tårnby FF in the second round of the Danish Cup. He suffered a concussion in a league match against FC Fredericia on 28 February 2022, sidelining him for the rest of the season which saw Lyngby win promotion back to the Superliga.

== International career ==
Gytkjær has appeared internationally for Denmark at under-16, 17, 18 and 20-levels, making 28 total appearances in which he scored seven goals.

== Personal life ==
He is the younger brother of fellow striker Christian Gytkjær.

== Career statistics ==
As of match played 9 September 2026

Appearances and goals by club, season and competition
Club	Season	League			National cup (Note: Includes Danish Cup, Norwegian Football Cup)		Europe		Other		Total	
Club	Season	Division	Apps	Goals	Apps	Goals	Apps	Goals	Apps	Goals	Apps	Goals
Lyngby	2012–13	Danish 1st Division	8	0	1	0	—		—		9	0
Lyngby	2013–14	Danish 1st Division	26	3	2	0	—		—		28	3
Lyngby	2014–15	Danish 1st Division	24	8	0	0	—		—		24	8
Lyngby	2015–16	Danish 1st Division	21	12	0	0	—		—		21	12
Lyngby	2016–17	Danish Superliga	11	0	0	0	—		—		11	0
Lyngby	Total		90	23	3	0	—		—		93	23
Haugesund	2017	Eliteserien	24	6	2	1	3 (Note: Appearances in UEFA Europa League)	0	—		29	7
Haugesund	2018	Eliteserien	17	5	2	3	—		—		19	8
Haugesund	Total		41	11	4	4	3	0	—		48	15
Lyngby	2018–19	Danish 1st Division	13	3	0	0	—		2 (Note: Appearances in Danish Superliga relegation play-offs)	1	15	4
Lyngby	2019–20	Danish Superliga	22	6	0	0	—		2	1	24	7
Lyngby	2020–21	Danish Superliga	6	0	0	0	—		—		6	0
Lyngby	2021–22	Danish 1st Division	19	12	1	4	—		—		20	16
Lyngby	2022–23	Danish Superliga	23	5	0	0	—		—		23	5
Lyngby	2023–24	Danish Superliga	28	5	5	3	—		—		20	6
Lyngby	2024–25	Danish Superliga	27	8	0	0	—		—		27	8
Lyngby	2025–26	Danish 1st Division	26	12	1	0	—		—		27	12
Lyngby	2026–27	Danish Superliga	6	1	2	1	—		—		8	2
Lyngby	Total		170	52	9	8	—		4	2	183	62
Career total			301	86	16	12	3	0	4	2	324	100

== Honours ==
Lyngby

- Danish 1st Division: 2015–16, 2025–26

Individual

- Danish 1st Division top scorer: 2025–26 (shared)
