= Jakub Serafin =

Polish footballer

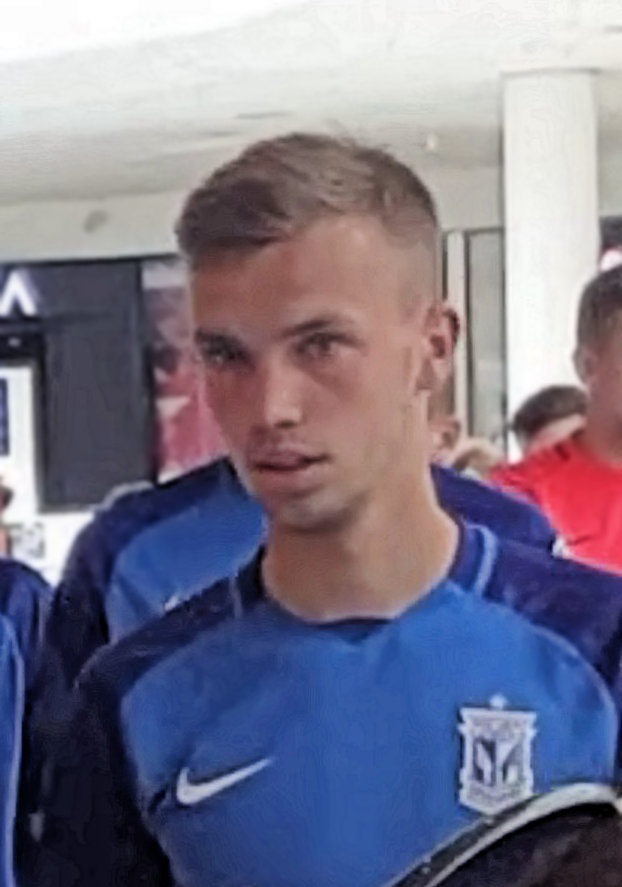
- Serafin in 2017 with Lech Poznań

Personal information
- Full name: Jakub Serafin
- Date of birth: 25 May 1996 (age 30)
- Place of birth: Olsztyn, Poland
- Height: 1.81 m (5 ft 11 in)
- Position: Midfielder

Team information
- Current team: Miedź Legnica
- Number: 8

Youth career
- GKS Gietrzwałd/Unieszewo
- Naki Olsztyn
- –2012: Stomil Olsztyn
- 2012–2014: Lech Poznań

Senior career*
| Years | Team | Apps | (Gls) |
| 2014–2018 | Lech Poznań II | 24 | (1) |
| 2015–2018 | Lech Poznań | 2 | (0) |
| 2015 | → GKS Bełchatów (loan) | 15 | (0) |
| 2016–2017 | → Bytovia Bytów (loan) | 41 | (3) |
| 2017 | → Haugesund (loan) | 10 | (1) |
| 2018–2020 | Cracovia | 6 | (0) |
| 2019–2020 | → Puszcza Niepołomice (loan) | 32 | (1) |
| 2020–2025 | Puszcza Niepołomice | 153 | (4) |
| 2025– | Miedź Legnica | 32 | (1) |

International career
| 2015 | Poland U19 | 4 | (1) |
- * Club domestic league appearances and goals as of 15:17, 29 May 2026 (UTC)

Jakub Serafin (born 25 May 1996) is a Polish professional footballer who plays as a midfielder for I liga club Miedź Legnica.

== Club career ==
On 26 January 2016, Serafin was loaned to Bytovia Bytów on a one-and-half-year deal.

On 1 August 2017, he was loaned to Haugesund. He returned to Lech Poznań after six months.

On 14 August 2020, after playing for the club on loan in the 2019–20 season, Serafin signed a two-year contract with Puszcza Niepołomice.

On 21 July 2025, fellow I liga club Miedź Legnica announced the signing of Serafin on a three-year deal, after activating his buyout clause.

== Career statistics ==
As of match played 24 May 2026

Appearances and goals by club, season and competition
| Club | Season | League | | | National cup (Note: Includes Polish Cup, Norwegian Cup) | | Europe | | Other | | Total | |
| Club | Season | Division | Apps | Goals | Apps | Goals | Apps | Goals | Apps | Goals | Apps | Goals |
|---|---|---|---|---|---|---|---|---|---|---|---|---|
| Lech Poznań II | 2013–14 | III liga, gr. C | 1 | 0 | — | | — | | — | | 1 | 0 |
| Lech Poznań II | 2014–15 | III liga, gr. C | 16 | 1 | — | | — | | — | | 16 | 1 |
| Lech Poznań II | 2017–18 | III liga, gr. II | 7 | 0 | — | | — | | — | | 7 | 0 |
| Lech Poznań II | Total | | 24 | 1 | — | | — | | — | | 24 | 1 |
| Lech Poznań | 2014–15 | Ekstraklasa | 2 | 0 | 1 | 0 | 0 | 0 | — | | 3 | 0 |
| GKS Bełchatów (loan) | 2015–16 | I liga | 15 | 0 | 1 | 0 | — | | — | | 16 | 0 |
| Bytovia Bytów (loan) | 2015–16 | I liga | 11 | 0 | — | | — | | — | | 11 | 0 |
| Bytovia Bytów (loan) | 2016–17 | I liga | 30 | 3 | 0 | 0 | — | | — | | 30 | 3 |
| Bytovia Bytów (loan) | Total | | 41 | 3 | 0 | 0 | — | | — | | 41 | 3 |
| Haugesund (loan) | 2017 | Eliteserien | 10 | 1 | 1 | 0 | — | | — | | 11 | 1 |
| Cracovia | 2018–19 | Ekstraklasa | 6 | 0 | 2 | 0 | — | | — | | 8 | 0 |
| Puszcza Niepołomice (loan) | 2019–20 | I liga | 32 | 1 | 1 | 0 | — | | — | | 33 | 1 |
| Puszcza Niepołomice | 2020–21 | I liga | 28 | 1 | 4 | 0 | — | | — | | 32 | 1 |
| Puszcza Niepołomice | 2021–22 | I liga | 30 | 0 | 0 | 0 | — | | — | | 30 | 0 |
| Puszcza Niepołomice | 2022–23 | I liga | 32 | 2 | 2 | 0 | — | | 2 (Note: Appearances in I liga promotion play-offs) | 0 | 36 | 2 |
| Puszcza Niepołomice | 2023–24 | Ekstraklasa | 29 | 0 | 1 | 0 | — | | — | | 30 | 0 |
| Puszcza Niepołomice | 2024–25 | Ekstraklasa | 32 | 1 | 5 | 0 | — | | — | | 37 | 1 |
| Puszcza Niepołomice | Total | | 183 | 5 | 13 | 0 | — | | 2 | 0 | 198 | 5 |
| Miedź Legnica | 2025–26 | I liga | 32 | 1 | 2 | 0 | — | | — | | 34 | 1 |
| Career total | | | 313 | 11 | 20 | 0 | 0 | 0 | 2 | 0 | 335 | 11 |

== Honours ==
Lech Poznań

- Ekstraklasa: 2014–15
