= Marko Ćosić =

Croatian footballer

Personal information
- Date of birth: 2 March 1994 (age 32)
- Place of birth: Zagreb, Croatia
- Height: 1.91 m (6 ft 3 in)
- Position: Centre back

Team information
- Current team: Inker Zaprešić
- Number: 4

Youth career
- 2002–2013: Inter Zaprešić

Senior career*
| Years | Team | Apps | (Gls) |
| 2011–2016 | Inter Zaprešić | 74 | (3) |
| 2016–2017 | Hajduk Split | 16 | (3) |
| 2017 | → Inter Zaprešić (loan) | 2 | (0) |
| 2017–2018 | Haugesund | 8 | (0) |
| 2019–2020 | Rudar Velenje | 25 | (1) |
| 2020–2021 | Hapoel Afula | 14 | (1) |
| 2021–2021 | Rudeš | 0 | (0) |
| 2021 | Hrvatski Dragovoljac | 13 | (0) |
| 2022-2023 | Gżira United | 39 | (0) |
| 2023- | Inker Zaprešić | 2 | (0) |

International career
| 2008 | Croatia U14 | 2 | (0) |
| 2009 | Croatia U15 | 1 | (0) |
| 2009 | Croatia U16 | 2 | (0) |
- * Club domestic league appearances and goals as of 31 August 2023

Marko Ćosić (born 2 March 1994) is a Croatian footballer who plays as a defender for Croatian side Inker Zaprešić.

== Club career ==
Born in Zagreb, Ćosić came through the youth ranks and started his professional career at NK Inter Zaprešić. A former youth international, he made his first-team and Prva HNL debut on 23 July 2011 in a 2–0 away loss to GNK Dinamo Zagreb, coming in the 77th minute for Stjepan Babić. Nevertheless, he continued on playing for the U-19 team, featuring only sporadically, until the club's relegation to the Druga HNL in the summer of 2013 when he became a first-team regular. His team achieved promotion after two seasons, and during the following 2015–16 Prva HNL season Ćosić was the team captain.

On 16 June 2016, Ćosić made a transfer to Hajduk Split for an undisclosed fee. Ćosić picked the number 44 kit. Ćosić made his Hajduk debut in a 2–2 away draw against CSMS Iași in the second round of 2016–17 UEFA Europa League qualifying, playing the full 90 minutes. Ćosić scored his first Hajduk goal in the 3rd round of 2016–17 UEFA Europa League qualifying, scoring the first in a 3–0 win over FC Oleksandriya at CSC Nika Stadium.

Ćosić signed with Slovenian PrvaLiga club NK Rudar Velenje on 23 January 2019 until June 2020.
