= Johnny Per Buduson =

Norwegian footballer (born 1991)

Personal information
- Full name: Johnny Per Buduson
- Date of birth: 9 September 1991 (age 35)
- Place of birth: Norway
- Position: Forward

Team information
- Current team: Skeid
- Number: 9

Youth career
- Hauketo

Senior career*
| Years | Team | Apps | (Gls) |
| –2013 | Klemetsrud | | |
| 2014–2016 | Skeid | 73 | (49) |
| 2017–2018 | Haugesund | 13 | (0) |
| 2017 | → Fredrikstad (loan) | 10 | (0) |
| 2018 | HamKam | 8 | (0) |
| 2018– | Skeid | 138 | (59) |
- * Club domestic league appearances and goals as of 18 November 2023

Johnny Per Buduson (born 9 September 1991) is a Norwegian footballer who plays for Skeid.

He originally joined Skeid from Klemetsrud ahead of the 2014 season.

== Career statistics ==
As of match played 14 November 2021

Appearances and goals by club, season and competition
| Club | Season | League | | | Cup | | Other | | Total | |
| Club | Season | Division | Apps | Goals | Apps | Goals | Apps | Goals | Apps | Goals |
|---|---|---|---|---|---|---|---|---|---|---|
| Skeid | 2014 | 2. divisjon | 25 | 12 | 1 | 0 | — | | 26 | 12 |
| Skeid | 2015 | 2. divisjon | 23 | 16 | 2 | 0 | — | | 25 | 16 |
| Skeid | 2016 | 2. divisjon | 25 | 21 | 1 | 0 | — | | 26 | 21 |
| Skeid | Total | | 73 | 49 | 4 | 0 | — | | 77 | 49 |
| Haugesund | 2017 | Eliteserien | 13 | 0 | 3 | 2 | — | | 16 | 2 |
| Fredrikstad (loan) | 2017 | 1. divisjon | 10 | 0 | 0 | 0 | 1 (Note: Appearance in relegation play-offs) | 0 | 11 | 0 |
| HamKam | 2018 | 1. divisjon | 8 | 0 | 4 | 2 | — | | 12 | 2 |
| Skeid | 2018 | 2. divisjon | 11 | 4 | 0 | 0 | — | | 11 | 4 |
| Skeid | 2019 | 1. divisjon | 30 | 8 | 3 | 2 | — | | 33 | 10 |
| Skeid | 2020 | 2. divisjon | 18 | 15 | — | | 2 (Note: Appearances in promotion play-offs) | 1 | 20 | 16 |
| Skeid | 2021 | 2. divisjon | 16 | 15 | 1 | 1 | — | | 17 | 16 |
| Skeid | Total | | 75 | 42 | 4 | 3 | 2 | 1 | 81 | 46 |
| Career total | | | 179 | 91 | 15 | 7 | 3 | 1 | 197 | 99 |
