= Torbjørn Agdestein =

Norwegian footballer (born 1991)

Personal information
- Date of birth: 29 November 1991 (age 34)
- Place of birth: Stord Municipality, Norway
- Position: Striker

Senior career*
Years	Team	Apps	(Gls)
2007–2010	Stord	35	(16)
2010–2013	Brighton & Hove Albion	6	(0)
2011	→ Bath City (loan)	3	(0)
2013–2014	Inverness Caledonian Thistle	13	(0)
2014–2017	Haugesund	52	(10)
2015	→ Kristiansund (loan)	13	(4)
2017–2018	Odd	7	(0)
2018–2021	Aalesund	49	(23)
2022	Stord	20	(16)
2024	Stord	7	(6)
Total		205	(75)

International career^{‡}
2012	Norway U21	1	(0)
- * Club domestic league appearances and goals as of 15 September 2021 ‡ National team caps and goals as of 13 May 2018

Torbjørn Agdestein (born 29 November 1991) is a Norwegian footballer who plays as a striker. After playing for Stord, Agdestein played for Brighton, Bath, Inverness, Haugesund, Kristiansund, Odd and Aalesund.

== Club career ==
=== Stord IL ===
Agdestein started his career at Stord IL, playing 35 games and scoring 16 goals.

=== Brighton & Hove Albion ===
In 2010, Agdestein was transferred to English club Brighton & Hove Albion for an undisclosed fee and featured in the development squad. Agdestein made his first competitive appearance for Brighton during an FA Cup 3rd round replay against Wrexham. Three days later, he made his first league appearance for Brighton coming on as a second-half substitute and providing an assist to Will Buckley in a 2–1 victory at Peterborough United. Towards the end of the 2010–11 season, Agdestein had his Brighton contract extended for one-year.

During September 2011, Agdestein joined Conference National side Bath City on loan. However, making three appearances, Agdestein returned to Brighton.

Following his return from Bath City, Agdestein soon played regularly in the reserve team and in March 2012, signed a two-year contract.

On 26 July 2013, Agdestein left Brighton after his contract was terminated by mutual consent despite having one-year left to run.

=== Inverness Caledonian Thistle ===
Agdestein signed for Inverness Caledonian Thistle in July 2013 on a six- month contract, the club beating off competition from Viking. However, Agdestein suffered a lack of playing time due to the form of Billy McKay and only made one start. Despite a desire to sign a new contract, Agdestein left the club when his contract expired and his agent said he was in talks with English clubs.

=== Haugesund ===
After leaving Scotland and not getting a move to England, Agdestein returned to Norway, where he joined Tippeligaen side Haugesund.

On 30 March, he signed a loan deal with Norwegian First Division club Kristiansund.

After breaking into the first team squad he earned the title as the club's top goalscorer in his final Haugesund season after bagging 10 league goals.

=== Odd ===
He signed for Odd on the 17 August on a three-year deal. Agdestein only earned 7 league appearances and failed to score a single league goal. He did, however, score a hat-trick against IL Hei in the first round of the 2017 Norwegian Football Cup.

=== Aalesund ===
Before the 2018 season he signed for second-tier side Aalesunds FK on a three-year deal. Following a lengthy injury, rupturing both his left and right cruciate ligament in succession, he was released in the summer of 2021.

=== Return to Stord IL ===
After being released by Aalesunds FK, he signed for Stord IL the following season. He made an immediate impact during his second stint at the club, scoring 16 goals in 20 appearances.

After the season he announced that he would retire from football, choosing to move to Bremnes IL, becoming their CEO.

In a surprise move, Agdestein chose to come back from retirement in August 2024 in an attempt to help struggling Stord avoid relegation.

== International career ==
On 22 February 2012 it was announced Agdestein had been called up to the Norway under-21 national team for the first time, ahead of their friendly with Slovenia. He was capped once.

== Career statistics ==
=== Club ===
As of match played 5 October 2024

Appearances and goals by club, season and competition
Club	Season	League			National Cup		Continental		Total	
Club	Season	Division	Apps	Goals	Apps	Goals	Apps	Goals	Apps	Goals
Brighton & Hove Albion	2011–12	Championship	4	0	2	0	-		6	0
Brighton & Hove Albion	2012–13	Championship	2	0	1	0	-		3	0
Brighton & Hove Albion	Total		6	0	3	0	-	-	9	0
Bath City (loan)	2011–12	National League	3	0	0	0	-		3	0
Inverness Caledonian Thistle	2013–14	Scottish Premiership	13	0	0	0	-		13	0
Haugesund	2014	Eliteserien	13	0	3	0	3	1	19	1
Haugesund	2015	Eliteserien	9	0	0	0	-		9	0
Haugesund	2016	Eliteserien	30	10	2	2	-		32	12
Haugesund	Total		52	10	5	2	3	1	60	13
Kristiansund (loan)	2015	Norwegian First Division	13	4	3	0	-		16	4
Odd	2017	Eliteserien	7	0	3	3	1	0	11	3
Aalesund	2018	Norwegian First Division	26	12	1	0	-		27	12
Aalesund	2019	Norwegian First Division	20	10	1	2	-		21	12
Aalesund	2020	Eliteserien	0	0	-		-		0	0
Aalesund	2021	Norwegian First Division	3	1	0	0	-		3	1
Aalesund	Total		49	23	2	2	-	-	51	25
Stord	2022	Norwegian Third Division	20	16	0	0	-		20	16
Stord	2024	Norwegian Third Division	7	6	0	0	-		7	6
Stord	Total		27	22	0	0	-	-	27	22
Career total			170	59	13	7	4	1	187	67
