= Roy Miljeteig =

Norwegian footballer (born 1988)

Personal information
- Full name: Roy André Miljeteig
- Date of birth: 12 June 1988 (age 38)
- Height: 1.80 m (5 ft 11 in)
- Position: Midfielder

Team information
- Current team: Torvastad
- Number: 7

Youth career
- Skjold
- Vedavåg

Senior career*
Years	Team	Apps	(Gls)
2006	Vedavåg		
2007–2009	Skjold		
2010	Vard		
2010	→ Åkra (loan)		
2011	Skjold		
2012–2015	Vard	91	(41)
2016	Haugesund	18	(3)
2017	Sandnes Ulf	27	(1)
2018	Egersund	23	(7)
2019–	Vard	26	(17)
- * Club domestic league appearances and goals as of 14 July 2020

Roy André Miljeteig (born 12 June 1988) is a Norwegian football midfielder who currently plays for Torvastad.

== Career ==
Miljeteig grew up in Aksdal. A late bloomer, he started his senior career in minnows SK Vedavåg while attending upper secondary school in Åkrehamn. The club was relegated from the fourth to the fifth tier. After three seasons in his native Skjold IL, he had a failed stint in Vard in 2010. However, from 2012 to 2015 he was a mainstay in Vard, Haugesund's second best team, and was picked up by FK Haugesund ahead of the 2016 season.

He made his Norwegian Premier League debut in March 2016 against Sarpsborg 08, at the relatively late age of 27.

Miljeteig signed with Vard for the 2019 season.

By 2024, Miljeteig had joined fifth-division side Torvastad. He played in their first-round cup tie against Haugesund, in which he scored the second of two penalties leading to the team's upset win.
