= Anthony Ikedi =

Nigerian footballer

Personal information
- Full name: Ikenna Anthony Ikedi
- Date of birth: 19 September 1998 (age 28)
- Place of birth: Nigeria
- Height: 1.98 m (6 ft 6 in)
- Position: Midfielder

Youth career
- –2017: Golden Boot Soccer Academy

Senior career*
Years	Team	Apps	(Gls)
2017–2018	KAA Gent	0	(0)
2017	→ Haugesund (loan)	13	(2)
2018–2020	Haugesund	10	(0)
2019	→ Nest-Sotra (loan)	3	(0)
2020	Øygarden	8	(1)
- * Club domestic league appearances and goals as of 3 October 2020

Ikenna Anthony Ikedi (born 19 September 1998) is a Nigerian footballer who plays as a midfielder for Øygarden.

== Career ==
=== Club ===
In May 2017, Ikedi joined FK Haugesund on loan from KAA Gent.

== Career statistics ==
=== Club ===
As of match played 13 December 2020

Appearances and goals by club, season and competition
Club	Season	League			National Cup		Continental		Total	
Club	Season	Division	Apps	Goals	Apps	Goals	Apps	Goals	Apps	Goals
Haugesund (loan)	2017	Eliteserien	13	2	2	0	2	1	17	3
Haugesund	2018	Eliteserien	9	0	1	0	-		1	0
Haugesund	2019	Eliteserien	1	0	0	0	1	0	2	0
Haugesund	Total		23	2	3	0	3	1	29	3
Nest-Sotra (loan)	2019	1. divisjon	3	0	0	0	-		3	0
Nest-Sotra (loan)	Total		3	0	0	0	-	-	3	0
Øygarden	2020	1. divisjon	8	1	0	0	-		8	1
Øygarden	Total		8	1	0	0	-	-	8	1
Career total			34	3	3	0	3	1	40	4
