= Vegard Skjerve =

Norwegian footballer (born 1988)

Personal information
- Date of birth: 22 May 1988 (age 38)
- Place of birth: Rennebu Municipality, Norway
- Height: 1.87 m (6 ft 1 1/2 in)
- Position: Defender

Senior career*
Years	Team	Apps	(Gls)
2008–2018	Haugesund	276	(14)
- * Club domestic league appearances and goals as of 21 October 2018

Vegard Skjerve (born 22 May 1988) is a retired Norwegian footballer who spent his career as a defender in Haugesund.

== Club career ==
Skjerve was born in Rennebu Municipality. He made his debut for Haugesund on 6 April 2008 against Notodden.

Planning to retire after the 2018 season, an injury forced him to retire prematurely with a month left.

== Career statistics ==
As of 21 October 2018

Season	Club	Division	League		Cup		Total	
Season	Club	Division	Apps	Goals	Apps	Goals	Apps	Goals
2008	Haugesund	1. divisjon	13	1	1	0	14	1
2009	Haugesund	1. divisjon	28	2	1	1	29	3
2010	Haugesund	Eliteserien	28	0	3	2	31	2
2011	Haugesund	Eliteserien	29	0	4	0	33	0
2012	Haugesund	Eliteserien	27	0	3	0	30	0
2013	Haugesund	Eliteserien	25	0	3	0	28	0
2014	Haugesund	Eliteserien	24	0	4	0	28	0
2015	Haugesund	Eliteserien	25	3	1	0	26	3
2016	Haugesund	Eliteserien	26	3	3	0	29	3
2017	Haugesund	Eliteserien	29	2	3	0	32	2
2018	Haugesund	Eliteserien	22	3	2	1	24	4
Career Total			276	14	28	4	304	18
