= Sverre Bjørkkjær =

Norwegian football player (born 1996)

Personal information
- Date of birth: 12 July 1996 (age 30)
- Place of birth: Philippines
- Height: 1.70 m (5 ft 7 in)
- Position: Defender

Team information
- Current team: Ullensaker/Kisa
- Number: 4

Senior career*
Years	Team	Apps	(Gls)
–2011	Søgne FK		
2012–2018	Haugesund	16	(0)
2015	→ Åsane (loan)	4	(0)
2018–2022	Strømmen	101	(2)
2023–	Ullensaker/Kisa	81	(0)

International career^{‡}
2011	Norway U-15	3	(0)
2013	Norway U-17	5	(0)
2014	Norway U-18	2	(0)
- * Club domestic league appearances and goals as of 15 November 2026 ‡ National team caps and goals as of 08:48, 15 November 2016 (UTC)

Sverre Bjørkkjær (born 12 July 1996) is a Norwegian footballer who plays as a defender for Ullensaker/Kisa. Prior to August 2012, Bjørkkjær has played for third division side, Søgne FK. Bjørkkjær has also played for Norway's national under-18 team at the U18 Lisbon International Tournament.

After spending the start of the 2015 season on loan to Åsane, Bjærkkjær made his first-tier debut for Haugesund in July 2015 as a substitute against Stabæk.

== Career statistics ==
=== Club ===
As of match played 15 May 2021

Appearances and goals by club, season and competition
Club	Season	League			National Cup		Continental		Total	
Club	Season	Division	Apps	Goals	Apps	Goals	Apps	Goals	Apps	Goals
Haugesund	2014	Tippeligaen	0	0	1	0	—		1	0
Haugesund	2015	Tippeligaen	12	0	0	0	—		12	0
Haugesund	2016	Tippeligaen	2	0	3	0	—		5	0
Haugesund	2017	Eliteserien	2	0	2	0	2	0	6	0
Haugesund	Total		16	0	6	0	2	0	24	0
Åsane (loan)	2015	OBOS-ligaen	4	0	2	0	—		6	0
Åsane (loan)	Total		4	0	2	0	—		6	0
Strømmen	2018	OBOS-ligaen	30	1	2	0	—		32	1
Strømmen	2019	OBOS-ligaen	28	0	3	0	—		31	0
Strømmen	2020	OBOS-ligaen	29	1	0	0	—		29	1
Strømmen	2021	OBOS-ligaen	1	0	0	0	—		1	0
Strømmen	Total		88	2	5	0	—		93	2
Career total			108	2	13	0	2	0	123	2
