= Liban Abdi =

Somali footballer (born 1988)

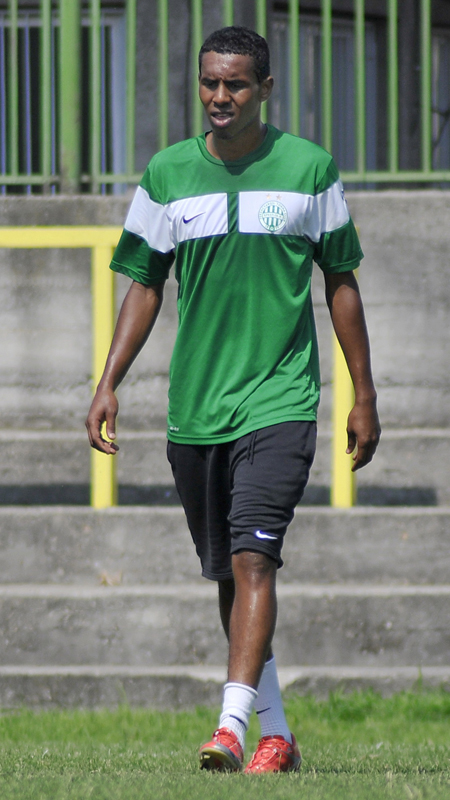
- Abdi with Ferencváros

Personal information
- Full name: Liban Abdi Ali
- Date of birth: 5 October 1988 (age 38)
- Place of birth: Burao, Somaliland
- Height: 1.82 m (6 ft 0 in)
- Position: Left winger

Youth career
- Vålerenga
- Skeid
- 2004–2007: Sheffield United

Senior career*
Years	Team	Apps	(Gls)
2007–2010	Sheffield United	0	(0)
2008–2010	→ Ferencváros (loan)	17	(3)
2008–2010	→ Ferencváros II (loan)	5	(0)
2010–2012	Ferencváros	29	(2)
2010–2012	Ferencváros II	14	(7)
2012–2013	Olhanense	16	(4)
2013–2014	Académica de Coimbra	11	(0)
2014–2015	Çaykur Rizespor	13	(1)
2015	→ Levski Sofia (loan)	9	(2)
2016–2017	Haugesund	38	(7)
2018	Al-Ettifaq	12	(2)
Total		164	(28)
- * Club domestic league appearances and goals as of 17:40, 23 June 2019 (UTC)

Liban Abdi Ali (Somali: Liibaan Cabdi; born 5 October 1988) is a Somalilander footballer who plays as a left winger. He previously played for Sheffield United in England, for Ferencváros in Hungary, for Olhanense in Portugal, and for FK Haugesund in his home country Norway.

Born in Somaliland, Abdi grew up in Norway and holds Norwegian citizenship. He is eligible to play internationally for Somaliland and Norway.

== Early life ==
Abdi was born in Burao, Somaliland, in 1988. He spent most of his childhood in Oslo, Norway, where he attended both primary and secondary school. He lived in Stovner, an eastern borough in Oslo.

== Career ==
=== Club career ===
Abdi moved to England with his family at the age of 14, and after a year in England he joined Sheffield United's youth academy. Abdi was the first Somali to be awarded a professional football contract at Sheffield United after impressing with the club's Academy. Following spells with Newport Pagnell Town and Buckingham Town, he was picked up by United when he subsequently moved to Sheffield with the assistance of the Football Unites, Racism Divides program.

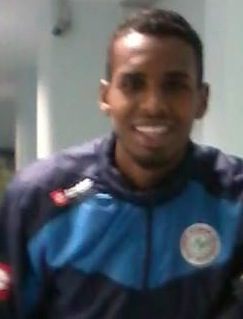
Liban Abdi in 2014.

Having signed a two-year contract in the summer of 2008, Abdi was loaned out to the Blades' sister club, Ferencváros, for the following season to gain first team experience. On his return, and after failing to break into the first team at Bramall Lane, he was released by Sheffield United in July 2010.

He then joined Ferencváros on a permanent basis, spending two seasons with the club, before moving to Portuguese Primeira Liga club Olhanense in the 2012 close season.

== International career ==
Abdi is eligible to play for both Somaliland, Somalia, and Norway but has not represented any of them although he has stated that he wants to play for Norway. When Norway national team coach Egil "Drillo" Olsen announced his squad for the friendly match against Greece in August 2012, Drillo said that he had never seen Abdi in action despite the fact that he was playing in Portugal. Two months later Drillo stated that Abdi was not good enough for the Norwegian team, when announcing his squad for the World Cup qualifiers against Switzerland and Cyprus. In September 2018 he stated that he would not play for Somalia, but would try and help the country off the pitch.

== Career statistics ==
As of match played on 12 April 2018

Appearances and goals by club, season and competition
Club	Season	League			Cup		League Cup		Other		Total	
Club	Season	Division	Apps	Goals	Apps	Goals	Apps	Goals	Apps	Goals	Apps	Goals
Sheffield United	2008–09	Championship	0	0	0	0	0	0	0	0	0	0
Sheffield United	2009–10	Championship	0	0	0	0	0	0	—		0	0
Sheffield United	Total		0	0	0	0	0	0	0	0	0	0
Ferencvárosi	2008–09 (Note: On loan from Sheffield United)	Nemzeti Bajnokság II	7	2	1	2	1	0	—		9	4
Ferencvárosi	2009–10	Nemzeti Bajnokság I	10	1	1	0	4	0	—		15	1
Ferencvárosi	2010–11	Nemzeti Bajnokság I	17	1	2	0	2	1	—		21	2
Ferencvárosi	2011–12	Nemzeti Bajnokság I	12	1	3	0	1	0	4 (Note: Appearance(s) in UEFA Europa League)	2	20	3
Ferencvárosi	Total		46	5	7	2	8	1	4	2	65	10
Ferencvárosi II	2009–10	Nemzeti Bajnokság III	5	0	—		—		—		5	0
Ferencvárosi II	2010–11	Nemzeti Bajnokság II	7	2	—		—		—		7	2
Ferencvárosi II	2011–12	Nemzeti Bajnokság II	7	5	—		—		—		7	5
Ferencvárosi II	Total		19	7	0	0	0	0	0	0	19	7
Olhanense	2012–13	Primeira Liga	16	4	1	1	2	0	—		19	5
Académica de Coimbra	2013–14	Primeira Liga	11	0	0	0	—		—		11	0
Çaykur Rizespor	2013–14	Süper Lig	6	1	0	0	—		—		6	1
Çaykur Rizespor	2014–15	Süper Lig	7	0	6	0	—		—		13	0
Çaykur Rizespor	Total		13	1	6	0	0	0	0	0	19	1
Levski Sofia (loan)	2014–15	A Group	9	2	5	0	—		—		14	2
Haugesund	2016	Eliteserien	14	2	0	0	—		—		14	2
Haugesund	2017	Eliteserien	24	5	1	0	—		4	2	29	7
Haugesund	Total		38	7	1	0	0	0	4	2	43	9
Al-Ettifaq	2017–18	Saudi Professional League	12	2	1	0	—		—		13	2
Career totals			164	28	21	3	10	1	8	4	203	36
