= State Highway 75 (Karnataka) =

Road in Karnataka, India

State Highway 75

Route information
- Maintained by Karnataka Road Development Corporation Limited.
- Length: 78 km (48 mi)

Major junctions
- From: Bhalki
- To: Chincholi

Location
- Country: India
- State: Karnataka
- Districts: Bidar, Gulbarga

Highway system
- Roads in India; Expressways; National; State; Asian; State Highways in Karnataka

State Highway 75 (Karnataka) is a state highway connecting Bhalki and Chincholi in the South Indian state of Karnataka India.It has a total length of 78 kilometres (48 mi).

== Route description ==
The route followed by State Highway 75 (Karnataka) connecting Bhalki with Chincholi via Humnabad, Kabirwadi, Chitgoppa, Kodambal, Ainapur, Chincholi, Channur, Rananpur cross, Narnal, Chimmanchod cross, Kanakpur, Chincholi and Chimmaidlai cross.

== See also ==
- List of state highways in Karnataka.
