= Tajlapur =

- village
- Location in Karnataka, India Tajlapur (India)
- Coordinates: 17.53043°N 77.3314899°E
- Country: India
- State: Karnataka
- District: Gulbarga
- Talukas: Chincholi

Government
  - Body: grampanchayat

Population (2011)
  - Total: 890

Languages
  - Official: Kannada
- Time zone: UTC+5:30 (IST)
- PIN: 585306.
- Vehicle registration: KA-32

Tajlapur is a village in the southern state of Karnataka, India. It is located in Chincholi taluk of Kalburgi district. The nearest villages are Kanakpur and Chimmanchod

== Demographics ==
As of 2011 India census Tajlapur had a population of 890 with 480 males and 410 females.

== Education Institutions ==
The school in Tajlapur is *Government higher primary school.

== Agriculture ==
Major Crops produced in the Tajlapur are Pigeon pea, Sorghum, Pearl millet, chickpea, mung bean, vigna mungo.

== Transport ==
KSRTC bus facility is available to travel within the Karnataka state and Nabour states, to travel within 15 to 20 km, share auto available. The nearest railway station is (45 km) tandur railway station TDU. The nearest airport is (157 km) Rajiv Gandhi International Airport.

== See also ==
- Gulbarga
- Districts of Karnataka
