= Khodabandeh (disambiguation) =

Khodabandeh may refer to:

== People ==
- Mohammad Khodabanda (1532–1595), Safavid Shah of Iran from 1578 to 1587
- Öljaitü (1282–1316), also known as Mohammad-e Khodabande, ruler of the Ilkhanate from 1304 to 1316

== Places ==
- Khodabandeh, village in Razavi Khorasan, Iran
- Khodabandeh County, county of Zanjan Province, Iran

- Khodabandeh (electoral district), electoral district corresponding to the county

- Khodabandehlu Rural District, sub-district of the Central District of the Sahneh County, Kermanshah Province, Iran
- Shahrak-e Taleqani, Andika, alternatively Khodabandeh, village in Khuzestan Province, Iran

== See also ==
- Khudavandpur, a village in Andhra Pradesh, India
- Khudavandpur, Chincholi, a village in Karnataka, India
