= Kalagi (disambiguation) =

Kalagi has several meanings, including:

- Kalagi, a town located in the Western Division of the Gambia
- Kalagi, Mukono, a town located in Mukono District, Uganda
- Kalagi, Mubende, a town located in Mubende District, Uganda
