= 2015 FK Haugesund season =

Haugesund
2015 season
- Chairman: Leif Helge Kaldheim
- Manager: Jostein Grindhaug
- Stadium: Haugesund Stadion
- Tippeligaen: 12th
- Norwegian Cup: Second Round vs Fyllingsdalen
- Top goalscorer: League: Christian Gytkjær (10); All: Christian Gytkjær (13)
Home colours	Away colours

The 2015 season is Haugesund's sixth season in the Tippeligaen following their promotion in 2009 and their 7th season with Jostein Grindhaug as manager.

== Squad ==
As of 19 August 2015

Note: Flags indicate national team as defined under FIFA eligibility rules; some limited exceptions apply. Players may hold more than one non-FIFA nationality.

No.	Pos.	Nation	Player
1	GK	NOR	Per Morten Kristiansen (captain)
3	DF	SWE	David Myrestam
4	DF	CRO	Mirko Kramarić
5	DF	NGR	William Troost-Ekong (on loan from Gent)
6	MF	SVK	Filip Kiss (loan from Cardiff City)
7	FW	DEN	Christian Gytkjær
8	MF	NOR	Michael Haukås
9	FW	SRB	Nikola Komazec
10	DF	NOR	Joakim Våge Nilsen
11	DF	NOR	Tor Arne Andreassen
12	GK	NOR	Per Kristian Bråtveit
13	MF	NOR	Eirik Mæland
14	FW	NOR	Torbjørn Agdestein

No.	Pos.	Nation	Player
15	DF	NOR	Martin Bjørnbak
16	MF	NGR	Sad'eeq Yusuf (on loan from Gent)
17	MF	DEN	Søren Christensen
18	DF	NOR	Vegard Skjerve
19	MF	NOR	Kristoffer Haraldseid
20	FW	SEN	Simon Diedhiou
22	MF	NOR	Alexander Stølås
23	MF	BRA	Daniel Bamberg
26	DF	NOR	Sverre Bjørkkjær
28	MF	NOR	Arent-Emil Hauge
29	MF	NOR	Robert Kling
30	MF	NOR	Erling Flotve Myklebust
—	FW	NGR	Adamu Abubakar

=== Out on loan ===
Note: Flags indicate national team as defined under FIFA eligibility rules; some limited exceptions apply. Players may hold more than one non-FIFA nationality.

No. / Pos. / Nation / Player; 21 / FW / FIN / Roope Riski (at SJK Seinäjôki)	No. / Pos. / Nation / Player; 50 / DF / SRB / Dušan Cvetinović (at Lens)

== Transfers ==
=== Winter ===
In: Note: Flags indicate national team as defined under FIFA eligibility rules; some limited exceptions apply. Players may hold more than one non-FIFA nationality.

No.	Pos.	Nation	Player
6	MF	DEN	Patrick Olsen (from (Italy) Inter Milan)
17	MF	DEN	Søren Christensen (from (Denmark) FC Nordsjælland)
20	FW	SEN	Simon Diedhiou (from (Senegal) Diambars FC)
21	FW	FIN	Roope Riski (from (Norway) Hønefoss)
28	MF	NOR	Arent-Emil Hauge (promoted)
29	MF	NOR	Robert Kling (promoted)

Out: Note: Flags indicate national team as defined under FIFA eligibility rules; some limited exceptions apply. Players may hold more than one non-FIFA nationality.

No.	Pos.	Nation	Player
6	MF	NGR	Emmanuel Ekpo (released)
9	FW	SRB	Nikola Komazec (loan to (Thailand) Pattaya United)
12	GK	NOR	Olav Dalen (retired)
14	FW	NOR	Torbjørn Agdestein (loan to (Norway) Kristiansund)
16	MF	NGR	Ugonna Anyora (to (Norway) Hønefoss)
17	MF	NOR	Geir Ludvig Fevang (to (Norway) Sandefjord)
20	MF	SWE	Maic Sema (to (Cyprus) AEL Limassol)
21	FW	SWE	Pontus Engblom (to (Norway) Sandnes Ulf)
26	DF	NOR	Sverre Bjørkkjær (loan to (Norway) Åsane)
—	MF	UGA	Tony Mawejje (released)

=== Summer ===
In: Note: Flags indicate national team as defined under FIFA eligibility rules; some limited exceptions apply. Players may hold more than one non-FIFA nationality.

No.	Pos.	Nation	Player
5	DF	NGR	William Troost-Ekong (on loan from (Belgium) Gent)
6	MF	SVK	Filip Kiss (on loan from (Wales) Cardiff City)
9	FW	SRB	Nikola Komazec (loan return from (Thailand) Pattaya United)
14	FW	NOR	Torbjørn Agdestein (loan return from (Norway) Kristiansund)
16	MF	NGR	Sad'eeq Yusuf (on loan from (Belgium) Gent)
26	DF	NOR	Sverre Bjørkkjær (loan return from (Norway) Åsane)
—	FW	NGR	Adamu Abubakar (from (Nigeria) GBS Academy)

Out: Note: Flags indicate national team as defined under FIFA eligibility rules; some limited exceptions apply. Players may hold more than one non-FIFA nationality.

No.	Pos.	Nation	Player
6	MF	DEN	Patrick Olsen (to (France) RC Lens)
21	FW	FIN	Roope Riski (on loan to (Finland) SJK Seinäjôki)
27	FW	NOR	Tor André Aasheim (to (Iceland) Breiðablik UBK)
50	DF	SRB	Dušan Cvetinović (on loan to (France) RC Lens)

== Competitions ==
=== Tippeligaen ===
==== Results summary ====
Overall								Home						Away					
Pld	W	D	L	GF	GA	GD	Pts	W	D	L	GF	GA	GD	W	D	L	GF	GA	GD
30	8	7	15	33	52	−19	31	3	5	7	19	27	−8	5	2	8	14	25	−11

Last updated: 8 November 2015.
Source: see below

==== Results by round ====
Round	1	2	3	4	5	6	7	8	9	10	11	12	13	14	15	16	17	18	19	20	21	22	23	24	25	26	27	28	29	30
Ground	A	H	A	H	A	H	A	H	A	H	H	A	H	A	H	A	H	A	H	A	H	A	A	H	A	H	A	H	A	H
Result	D	L	L	D	W	W	L	L	D	W	L	L	D	L	D	W	D	W	W	L	L	W	L	D	W	L	L	L	L	L
Position	10	14	14	14	13	9	12	13	12	11	11	13	13	13	14	13	13	11	10	11	11	11	11	10	10	11	11	12	12	12

Updated to match(es) played on 8 November 2015. Source: see below
A = Away; H = Home; W = Win; D = Draw; L = Loss

==== Results ====
6 April 2015 1	Stabæk	1–1	Haugesund	Bærum
18:00 CEST (UTC+2)	Diomande 15'; Kassi (yellow card) 44'; Asante (yellow card) 81'	Summary	Andreassen (yellow card) 72'; Diedhiou 80'; Mæland (penalty missed); Haraldseid (yellow card) 89'	Stadium: Nadderud Stadion; Attendance: 3,512; Referee: Ken Henry Johnsen

12 April 2015 2	Haugesund	0–6	Rosenborg	Haugesund
18:00 CEST (UTC+2)	Christensen (yellow card) 29'	Summary	Søderlund 18', 58'; Mikkelsen 28'; Malec 80'; Skjelvik 86'	Stadium: Haugesund Stadion; Attendance: 5,761; Referee: Tommy Skjerven

17 April 2015 3	Vålerenga	2–0	Haugesund	Oslo
19:00 CEST (UTC+2)	Brown 36', 37'	Summary	Bjørnbak (yellow card) 22'; Andreassen (yellow card) 90+3'	Stadium: Ullevaal Stadion; Attendance: 8,007; Referee: Andres Johansen

25 April 2015 4	Haugesund	0–0	Molde	Haugesund
18:00 CEST (UTC+2)	Bamberg (yellow card) 57'; Bjørnbak (yellow card) 73'; Haukås (yellow card) 85'	Summary	Diouf (yellow card) 84'	Stadium: Haugesund Stadion; Attendance: 5,446; Referee: Trond Ivar Døvle

30 April 2015 5	Bodø/Glimt	1–2	Haugesund	Bodø
18:00 CEST (UTC+2)	Cruz (yellow card) 79'; Azemi 84'	Summary	Nilsen 26'; Gytkjær (yellow card) 39' (yellow-red card) 45+1'; Skjerve 54', (yellow card) 64' (yellow-red card) 69'	Stadium: Aspmyra Stadion; Attendance: 2,528; Referee: Martin Lundby

2 May 2015 6	Haugesund	2–1	Sandefjord	Haugesund
18:00 CEST (UTC+2)	Diedhiou 34'; Gytkjær 67'	Summary	Mjelde 8'; Risholt (yellow card) 26' (yellow-red card) 87'	Stadium: Haugesund Stadion; Attendance: 5,002; Referee: Ola Hobber Nilsen

10 May 2015 7	Sarpsborg 08	3–0	Haugesund	Sarpsborg
18:00 CEST (UTC+2)	Hansen 10'; Ernemann (yellow card) 58'; Nordvik 63'; Zajić 81'	Summary		Stadium: Sarpsborg Stadion; Attendance: 3,432; Referee: Trond Ivar Døvle

13 May 2015 8	Haugesund	0–2	Viking	Haugesund
18:00 CEST (UTC+2)	Olsen (yellow card) 58'	Summary	de Lanlay 9'; Þorsteinsson (yellow card) 16'; Bödvarsson 85'	Stadium: Haugesund Stadion; Attendance: 6,634; Referee: Dag Vidar Hafsås

16 May 2015 9	Odd	0–0	Haugesund	Skien
18:00 CEST (UTC+2)		Summary	Skjerve (yellow card) 17'; Myrestam (yellow card) 31'; Olsen (yellow card) 41'; Riski (yellow card) 67'	Stadium: Skagerak Arena; Attendance: 9,054; Referee: Tore Hansen

24 May 2015 10	Haugesund	4–0	Strømsgodset	Haugesund
18:00 CEST (UTC+2)	Bjørnbak 12'; Diedhiou 34', 71'; Skjerve (yellow card) 55'; Christensen (yellow card) 87'; Bamberg 89'	Summary	Adjei-Boateng (yellow card) 44'; Kovács (yellow card) 46'; Wikheim (yellow card) 75'	Stadium: Haugesund Stadion; Attendance: 5,726; Referee: Anders Johansen

30 May 2015 11	Haugesund	0–2	Start	Haugesund
15:30 CEST (UTC+2)	Diedhiou (yellow card) 88'	Summary	Ajer 50', 85'; Dahle (yellow card) 59'	Stadium: Haugesund Stadion; Attendance: 5,109; Referee: Espen Berntsen

6 June 2015 12	Aalesund	2–1	Haugesund	Ålesund
18:00 CEST (UTC+2)	Latifu (yellow card) 36'; Larsen 40'; Barrantes 45+1'	Summary	Diedhiou 68', (yellow card) 74'; Riski (yellow card) 72'; Haukås (yellow card) 83'	Stadium: Color Line Stadion; Attendance: 5,660; Referee: Omar Rafiq

21 June 2015 13	Haugesund	1–1	Mjøndalen	Haugesund
18:00 CEST (UTC+2)	Gytkjær 6'; Cvetinović (yellow card) 34'; Andreassen (yellow card) 83'; Stølås (yellow card) 89'	Summary	Diop (yellow card) 26'; M.Strange (yellow card) 39'; Aasmundsen (yellow card) 52' (yellow-red card) 68'; Sundli 64'	Stadium: Haugesund Stadion; Attendance: 6,016; Referee: Trond Ivar Døvle

28 June 2015 14	Tromsø	2–0	Haugesund	Tromsø
18:00 CEST (UTC+2)	Ondrášek 80'; Johansen 85'	Summary	Christensen (yellow card) 38'	Stadium: Alfheim Stadion; Attendance: 3,240; Referee: Dag Vidar Hafsås

4 July 2015 15	Haugesund	3–3	Lillestrøm	Haugesund
18:00 CEST (UTC+2)	Gytkjær 13' (pen.), 23', 90+1'	Summary	Knudtzon 11'; Riise (yellow card) 12'; Fofana 55', 86'	Stadium: Haugesund Stadion; Attendance: 5,273; Referee: Kai Erik Steen

10 July 2015 16	Molde	0–1	Haugesund	Molde
19:00 CEST (UTC+2)	Semb Berge (yellow card) 33'; Toivio (yellow card) 90'	Summary	Diedhiou 8'; Cvetinović (yellow card) 74'; Bråtveit (yellow card) 90+3'	Stadium: Aker Stadion; Attendance: 9,355; Referee: Omar Rafiq

25 July 2015 17	Haugesund	2–2	Stabæk	Haugesund
18:00 CEST (UTC+2)	Haukås 31'; Cvetinović (yellow card) 74'; Skjerve 90+1'	Summary	Jalasto 11' (yellow card) 63'; Næss (yellow card) 21'; Diomande 41'; Grossman (yellow card) 74'	Stadium: Haugesund Stadion; Attendance: 4,533; Referee: Kim Andre Johnsen

31 July 2015 18	Viking	0–1	Haugesund	Stavanger
19:00 CEST (UTC+2)	Danielsen (yellow card) 42'	Summary	Mets 69' (o.g.); Skjerve (yellow card) 76'	Stadium: Viking Stadion; Attendance: 9,662; Referee: Tommy Skjerven

9 August 2015 19	Haugesund	3–1	Aalesund	Haugesund
18:00 CEST (UTC+2)	Gytkjær 29', 42', 88'; Haraldseid (yellow card) 53'	Summary	Þrándarson (yellow card) 43'; Lie (yellow card) 44'; James 54' (pen.); Bjørdal (yellow card) 82'	Stadium: Haugesund Stadion; Attendance: 4,668; Referee: Martin Lundby

15 August 2015 20	Mjøndalen	2–1	Haugesund	Mjøndalen
CEST (UTC+2)	M.Olsen (yellow card) 52'; Bernstein 56'; Hurtado (yellow card) 59'; Henderson 90+4'	Summary	Yusuf (yellow card) 27'; Hurtado 39' (o.g.); Haukås (yellow card) 90+3'	Stadium: Mjøndalen Arena; Attendance: 2,233; Referee: Dag Vidar Hafsås

23 August 2015 21	Haugesund	2–4	Bodø/Glimt	Haugesund
18:00 CEST (UTC+2)	Andreassen 16'; Skjerve 65'	Summary	Chatto 17'; Sørloth 30'; Bjørnbak 73' (o.g.); Valentin (yellow card) 78'; Olsen 84'	Stadium: Haugesund Stadion; Attendance: 5,827; Referee: Anders Johansen

30 August 2015 22	Start	1–3	Haugesund	Kristiansand
18:00 CEST (UTC+2)	Hammer (yellow card) 72'; Kristjánsson 89'; Vikstøl (yellow card) 90+1'	Summary	Haraldseid 9'; Diedhiou 64'; Gytkjær 80'	Stadium: Sør Arena; Attendance: 4,989; Referee: Trygve Kjensli

11 September 2015 23	Strømsgodset	5–0	Haugesund	Drammen
19:00 CEST (UTC+2)	Horn (yellow card) 9'; Vilsvik 23'; Tagbajumi 27', 32'; Adjei-Boateng 40'; Abu 74'	Summary	Kiss (yellow card) 14'; Christensen (yellow card) 22'; Bamberg (yellow card) 52'	Stadium: Marienlyst Stadion; Attendance: 6,180; Referee: Tore Hansen

20 September 2015 24	Haugesund	1–1	Sarpsborg 08	Haugesund
18:00 CEST (UTC+2)	Stølås 27'; Troost-Ekong (yellow card) 33'; Haukås (yellow card) 40'; Bjørnbak (yellow card) 45+2'	Summary	Wiig (yellow card) 22'; Groven (yellow card) 34'; Nordvik (yellow card) 44'; Maguire 87'; Trondsen (yellow card) 89'	Stadium: Haugesund Stadion; Attendance: 4,766; Referee: Espen Eskås

26 September 2015 25	Sandefjord	0–1	Haugesund	Sandefjord
18:00 CEST (UTC+2)	Sellin (yellow card) 45'; Pedersen (yellow card) 75'	Summary	Diedhiou 84'	Stadium: Komplett.no Arena; Attendance: 3,421; Referee: Tore Hansen

4 October 2015 26	Haugesund	1–2	Odd	Haugesund
15:30 CEST (UTC+2)	Kiss (yellow card) 47'; Diedhiou 69'	Summary	Nordkvelle 33'; Ruud (yellow card) 59'; Occéan 88'	Stadium: Haugesund Stadion; Attendance: 4,855; Referee: Tommy Skjerven

18 October 2015 27	Lillestrøm	2–0	Haugesund	Lillestrøm
18:00 CEST (UTC+2)	Skjerve 17' (o.g.); Vilhjálmsson 19'	Summary	Kiss (yellow card) 42'; Bjørnbak (yellow card) 65'	Stadium: Åråsen Stadion; Attendance: 4,051; Referee: Martin Lundby

24 October 2015 28	Haugesund	0–1	Vålerenga	Haugesund
18:00 CEST (UTC+2)	Yusuf (yellow card) 59'	Summary	Grindheim 45'; Zahid (yellow card) 54'; Braaten (yellow card) 84'; Holm (yellow card) 90+1'	Stadium: Haugesund Stadion; Attendance: 4,802; Referee: Kim Andre Johnsen

1 November 2015 29	Rosenborg	4–3	Haugesund	Trondheim
18:00 CET (UTC+1)	de Lanlay 20'; Mikkelsen 64'; Selnæs 66'; Vilhjálmsson 83'	Summary	Gytkjær 14' (pen.); Andreassen 53'; Haraldseid (yellow card) 62'; Haukås 69'	Stadium: Lerkendal Stadion; Attendance: 20,745; Referee: Kai Erik Steen

8 November 2015 30	Haugesund	0–1	Tromsø	Haugesund
18:00 CET (UTC+1)	Diedhiou (yellow card) 90+4'	Summary	Wangberg (yellow card) 18'; Antonsen 31'; Landu (yellow card) 65'; Lekström (yellow card) 84'	Stadium: Haugesund Stadion; Attendance: 6,372; Referee: Kim Andre Johnsen

==== Table ====
Pos	Team	Pld	W	D	L	GF	GA	GD	Pts	Qualification or relegation
10	Aalesund	30	11	5	14	42	57	−15	38	
11	Sarpsborg 08	30	8	10	12	37	49	−12	34	
12	Haugesund	30	8	7	15	33	52	−19	31	
13	Tromsø	30	7	8	15	36	50	−14	29	
14	Start (O)	30	5	7	18	35	64	−29	22	Qualification for the relegation play-offs

Source: Football Association of Norway (in Norwegian), Soccerway
Rules for classification: 1) Points; 2) Goal difference; 3) Goals scored; 4) Head-to-head points; 5) Head-to-head goal difference; 6) Head-to-head away goals scored (between two teams).
(O) Play-off winners

=== Norwegian Cup ===
22 April 2015 First Round	Randaberg	0–4	Haugesund	Randaberg
18:00 CEST (UTC+2)		Summary	Myrestam 30'; Gytkjær 32', 41', 53'; Andreassen (yellow card) 37'; Bjørnbak (yellow card) 44'	Stadium: Randaberg Stadion; Attendance: 200; Referee: Daniel Higraff

6 May 2015 Second Round	Fyllingsdalen	4–1	Haugesund	Bergen
18:00 CEST (UTC+2)	Herrem 23', 53' (pen.), 71'; Nielsen (yellow card) 52'; Heltne 85'	Summary	Diedhiou 39'; Kramarić (red card)	Stadium: Varden Amfi; Attendance: 648; Referee: Kai Erik Steen

== Squad statistics ==
As of match played 8 November 2015

=== Appearances and goals ===
No.	Pos	Nat	Player	Total		Tippeligaen		Norwegian Cup	
No.	Pos	Nat	Player	Apps	Goals	Apps	Goals	Apps	Goals
1	GK	(Norway) NOR	Per Morten Kristiansen	4	0	3	0	1	0
3	DF	(Sweden) SWE	David Myrestam	23	1	22	0	1	1
4	DF	(Croatia) CRO	Mirko Kramarić	1	0	0	0	1	0
5	DF	(Nigeria) NGR	William Troost-Ekong	13	0	13	0	0	0
6	MF	(Slovakia) SVK	Filip Kiss	9	0	9	0	0	0
7	FW	(Denmark) DEN	Christian Gytkjær	32	13	29+1	10	1+1	3
8	MF	(Norway) NOR	Michael Haukås	27	2	16+9	2	1+1	0
10	DF	(Norway) NOR	Joakim Våge Nilsen	11	1	7+3	1	1	0
11	DF	(Norway) NOR	Tor Arne Andreassen	18	2	10+6	2	2	0
12	GK	(Norway) NOR	Per Kristian Bråtveit	28	0	27	0	1	0
13	MF	(Norway) NOR	Eirik Mæland	8	0	7+1	0	0	0
14	FW	(Norway) NOR	Torbjørn Agdestein	9	0	2+7	0	0	0
15	DF	(Norway) NOR	Martin Bjørnbak	20	1	18	1	1+1	0
16	MF	(Nigeria) NGR	Sad'eeq Yusuf	7	0	5+2	0	0	0
17	MF	(Denmark) DEN	Søren Christensen	29	0	27+1	0	1	0
18	DF	(Norway) NOR	Vegard Skjerve	26	3	25	3	1	0
19	MF	(Norway) NOR	Kristoffer Haraldseid	30	1	28+1	1	1	0
20	FW	(Senegal) SEN	Simon Diedhiou	30	10	21+7	9	1+1	1
22	MF	(Norway) NOR	Alexander Stølås	21	1	8+12	1	0+1	0
23	MF	(Brazil) BRA	Daniel Bamberg	26	1	21+4	1	1	0
26	DF	(Norway) NOR	Sverre Bjørkkjær	12	0	6+6	0	0	0
28	MF	(Norway) NOR	Arent-Emil Hauge	3	0	0+3	0	0	0
29	MF	(Norway) NOR	Robert Kling	2	0	0+1	0	1	0
30	MF	(Norway) NOR	Erling Flotve Myklebust	2	0	0+2	0	0	0
Players away from Haugesund on loan:
9	FW	(Serbia) SRB	Nikola Komazec	0	0	0	0	0	0
21	FW	(Finland) FIN	Roope Riski	12	0	2+8	0	2	0
50	DF	(Serbia) SRB	Dušan Cvetinović	16	0	14	0	2	0
Players who appeared for Haugesund no longer at the club:
6	MF	(Denmark) DEN	Patrick Olsen	12	0	10+1	0	1	0
27	FW	(Norway) NOR	Tor André Aasheim	3	0	0+1	0	1+1	0

=== Goal scorers ===
Place	Position	Nation	Number	Name	Tippeligaen	Norwegian Cup	Total
1	FW	(Denmark)	7	Christian Gytkjær	10	3	13
2	FW	(Senegal)	20	Simon Diedhiou	9	1	10
3	DF	(Norway)	18	Vegard Skjerve	3	0	3
4	DF	(Norway)	11	Tor Arne Andreassen	2	0	2
4	MF	(Norway)	8	Michael Haukås	1	0	1
4				Own goal	2	0	2
7	DF	(Norway)	10	Joakim Våge Nilsen	1	0	1
7	DF	(Norway)	15	Martin Bjørnbak	1	0	1
7	MF	(Brazil)	23	Daniel Bamberg	1	0	1
7	MF	(Norway)	19	Kristoffer Haraldseid	1	0	1
7	MF	(Norway)	22	Alexander Stølås	1	0	1
7	DF	(Sweden)	3	David Myrestam	0	1	1
				TOTALS	33	5	38

=== Disciplinary record ===
Number	Nation	Position	Name	Tippeligaen		Norwegian Cup		Total	
Number	Nation	Position	Name	Yellow card	Red card	Yellow card	Red card	Yellow card	Red card
3	(Sweden)	DF	David Myrestam	1	0	0	0	1	0
4	(Croatia)	DF	Mirko Kramarić	0	0	0	1	0	1
5	(Nigeria)	DF	William Troost-Ekong	1	0	0	0	1	0
6	(Denmark)	MF	Patrick Olsen	2	0	0	0	2	0
6	(Slovakia)	MF	Filip Kiss	3	0	0	0	3	0
7	(Denmark)	FW	Christian Gytkjær	2	1	0	0	2	1
8	(Norway)	MF	Michael Haukås	4	0	0	0	4	0
11	(Norway)	DF	Tor Arne Andreassen	3	0	1	0	4	0
12	(Norway)	GK	Per Kristian Bråtveit	1	0	0	0	1	0
15	(Norway)	DF	Martin Bjørnbak	4	0	1	0	5	0
16	(Nigeria)	MF	Sad'eeq Yusuf	2	0	0	0	2	0
17	(Denmark)	MF	Søren Christensen	4	0	0	0	4	0
18	(Norway)	DF	Vegard Skjerve	5	1	0	0	5	1
19	(Norway)	DF	Kristoffer Haraldseid	3	0	0	0	3	0
20	(Senegal)	FW	Simon Diedhiou	3	0	0	0	3	0
21	(Finland)	FW	Roope Riski	2	0	0	0	2	0
22	(Norway)	MF	Alexander Stølås	1	0	0	0	1	0
23	(Brazil)	MF	Daniel Bamberg	2	0	0	0	2	0
50	(Serbia)	DF	Dušan Cvetinović	3	0	0	0	3	0
			TOTALS	46	2	2	1	48	3
