= 2014 FK Haugesund season =

Haugesund
2014 season
- Chairman: Leif Helge Kaldheim
- Manager: Jostein Grindhaug
- Stadium: Haugesund Stadion
- Tippeligaen: 11th
- Norwegian Cup: Quarter-finals vs Stabæk
- Europa League: Second qualifying round
- Top goalscorer: League: Christian Gytkjær (15); All: Christian Gytkjær (16)
- Highest home attendance: 8,945 vs Brann; 9 November 2014
- Lowest home attendance: 2,715 vs Tromsdalen; 27 June 2014
- Average home league attendance: 5,400
Home colours	Away colours

The 2014 season was FK Haugesund's 5th season back in the Tippeligaen since their promotion in 2009 and their 6th season with Jostein Grindhaug as manager. They finished the season in 11th position, were eliminated at the Quarter-finals stage of the Norwegian Cup by Stabæk and reached Second qualifying round of the Europa League where they were defeated by FK Sarajevo.

== Squad ==
Note: Flags indicate national team as defined under FIFA eligibility rules; some limited exceptions apply. Players may hold more than one non-FIFA nationality.

No.	Pos.	Nation	Player
1	GK	NOR	Per Morten Kristiansen (captain)
3	DF	SWE	David Myrestam
4	DF	CRO	Mirko Kramarić
6	MF	NGR	Emmanuel Ekpo
7	FW	DEN	Christian Gytkjær
8	MF	NOR	Michael Haukås
9	FW	SRB	Nikola Komazec
10	DF	NOR	Joakim Våge Nilsen
11	DF	NOR	Tor Arne Andreassen
12	GK	NOR	Olav Dalen
13	MF	NOR	Eirik Mæland
14	FW	NOR	Torbjørn Agdestein

No.	Pos.	Nation	Player
15	DF	NOR	Martin Bjørnbak
16	MF	NGR	Ugonna Anyora
17	MF	NOR	Geir Ludvig Fevang
18	DF	NOR	Vegard Skjerve
19	MF	NOR	Kristoffer Haraldseid
20	FW	SWE	Maic Sema
21	FW	SWE	Pontus Engblom
22	MF	NOR	Alexander Stølås
23	MF	BRA	Daniel Bamberg
24	GK	NOR	Per Kristian Worre Bråtveit
50	DF	SRB	Dušan Cvetinović

=== Out on loan ===
Note: Flags indicate national team as defined under FIFA eligibility rules; some limited exceptions apply. Players may hold more than one non-FIFA nationality.

No.	Pos.	Nation	Player
6	MF	UGA	Tony Mawejje (at Valur)

== Transfers ==
=== Winter ===
In: Note: Flags indicate national team as defined under FIFA eligibility rules; some limited exceptions apply. Players may hold more than one non-FIFA nationality.

No.	Pos.	Nation	Player
5	MF	SLO	Rok Elsner (from (Greece) Aris)
6	MF	UGA	Tony Mawejje (from (Iceland) ÍBV)
14	MF	NOR	Torbjørn Agdestein (from (Scotland) Inverness CT)
20	FW	SWE	Maic Sema (loan return from (Netherlands) MVV Maastricht)
21	FW	SWE	Pontus Engblom (loan return from (Sweden) GIF Sundsvall)
22	MF	NOR	Alexander Stølås (from (Norway) Vard Haugesund)

Out: Note: Flags indicate national team as defined under FIFA eligibility rules; some limited exceptions apply. Players may hold more than one non-FIFA nationality.

No.	Pos.	Nation	Player
4	DF	DEN	Henrik Kildentoft (loan to (Norway) Hønefoss)
5	MF	NOR	Trygve Nygaard (Retired)
10	MF	SLE	Umaru Bangura (to (Belarus) Dinamo Minsk)
14	DF	ISL	Andrés Már Jóhannesson (to (Iceland) Fylkir)
25	FW	NOR	Henrik Kjelsrud Johansen (to (Norway) Odd)

=== Summer ===
In: Note: Flags indicate national team as defined under FIFA eligibility rules; some limited exceptions apply. Players may hold more than one non-FIFA nationality.

No.	Pos.	Nation	Player
4	DF	CRO	Mirko Kramarić (from (Croatia) Istra 1961)
6	MF	NGR	Emmanuel Ekpo (from (Norway) Molde)
9	FW	SRB	Nikola Komazec (from (South Korea) Busan)

Out: Note: Flags indicate national team as defined under FIFA eligibility rules; some limited exceptions apply. Players may hold more than one non-FIFA nationality.

No.	Pos.	Nation	Player
5	MF	SLO	Rok Elsner (released)
6	MF	UGA	Tony Mawejje (loan to (Iceland) Valur)
—	DF	DEN	Henrik Kildentoft (loan to (Norway) Hønefoss made permanent)

== Competitions ==
=== Tippeligaen ===
==== Results summary ====
Overall								Home						Away					
Pld	W	D	L	GF	GA	GD	Pts	W	D	L	GF	GA	GD	W	D	L	GF	GA	GD
30	10	6	14	43	48	−5	36	6	4	5	27	20	+7	4	2	9	16	28	−12

==== Results by round ====
Round	1	2	3	4	5	6	7	8	9	10	11	12	13	14	15	16	17	18	19	20	21	22	23	24	25	26	27	28	29	30
Ground	H	A	H	A	H	A	H	A	H	A	H	A	H	A	H	A	H	A	H	A	H	A	A	H	A	H	A	H	A	H
Result	D	L	D	L	L	W	L	L	L	D	D	L	W	L	W	D	W	W	D	L	L	L	L	W	L	W	W	W	W	L
Position	7	12	12	14	15	12	13	15	16	16	15	16	14	15	14	13	13	11	11	12	12	13	14	13	13	13	12	12	10	11

Updated to match(es) played on 10 November 2014. Source: see below
A = Away; H = Home; W = Win; D = Draw; L = Loss

==== Results ====
29 March 2014 1	Haugesund	1–1	Lillestrøm	Haugesund
15:30 CET (UTC+1)	Gytkjær 81'	Summary	Ringstad 76'	Stadium: Haugesund Stadion; Attendance: 5,649; Referee: Espen Berntsen

6 April 2014 2	Start	3–1	Haugesund	Kristiansand
15:30 CEST (UTC+2)	Sarr 71'; Berger 75'; Kristjánsson 77'	Summary	Engblom 23'	Stadium: Sør Arena; Attendance: 5,324; Referee: Trygve Kjensli

12 April 2014 3	Haugesund	1–1	Vålerenga	Haugesund
18:00 CEST (UTC+2)	Fevang 44'	Summary	Kjartansson 90+2'	Stadium: Haugesund Stadion; Attendance: 4,769; Referee: Anders Johansen

21 April 2014 4	Viking	2–0	Haugesund	Stavanger
15:30 CEST (UTC+2)	Ingason 25'; Þorsteinsson 40'	Summary		Stadium: Viking Stadion; Attendance: 11,174; Referee: Kjetil Sælen

27 April 2014 5	Haugesund	0–3	Sogndal	Haugesund
18:00 CEST (UTC+2)		Summary	Otoo 16'; Valgarðsson 34'; Utvik 57'	Stadium: Haugesund Stadion; Attendance: 5,419; Referee: Tore Hansen

30 April 2014 6	Brann	1–3	Haugesund	Bergen
19:00 CEST (UTC+2)	Orlov 27'	Summary	Gytkjær 40' (pen.), 42', 50'	Stadium: Brann Stadion; Attendance: 10012; Referee: Omar Rafiq

4 May 2014 7	Haugesund	1–2	Aalesund	Haugesund
15:30 CEST (UTC+2)	Bamberg 65'	Summary	Mattila 44'; Grytten 57'	Stadium: Haugesund Stadion; Attendance: 4,756; Referee: Svein Erik Edvartsen

10 May 2014 8	Bodø/Glimt	2–1	Haugesund	Bodø
15:30 CEST (UTC+2)	Laajab 10'; Ndiaye 45'	Summary	Stølås 74'	Stadium: Aspmyra Stadion; Attendance: 2,907; Referee: Trond Ivar Døvle

16 May 2014 9	Haugesund	1–2	Odds	Haugesund
18:00 CEST (UTC+2)	Fevang 51'	Summary	Shala 40'; Storbæk 90'	Stadium: Haugesund Stadion; Attendance: 6,323; Referee: Tommy Skjerven

20 May 2014 10	Sandnes Ulf	0–0	Haugesund	Sandnes
18:00 CEST (UTC+2)		Summary		Stadium: Sandnes Idrettspark; Attendance: 2,905; Referee: Trond Ivar Døvle

23 May 2014 11	Haugesund	1–1	Molde	Haugesund
19:00 CEST (UTC+2)	Stølås 86'	Summary	Linnes 49'	Stadium: Haugesund Stadion; Attendance: 5,311; Referee: Omar Rafiq

9 June 2014 12	Strømsgodset	2–1	Haugesund	Drammen
15:30 CEST (UTC+2)	Fossum 33'; Ødegaard 69'	Summary	Stølås 8'	Stadium: Marienlyst Stadion; Attendance: 6,312; Referee: Tore Hansen

12 June 2014 13	Haugesund	4–0	Sarpsborg 08	Haugesund
20:05 CEST (UTC+2)	Sema 14', 68'; Gytkjær 17'; Fevang 44'	Summary		Stadium: Haugesund Stadion; Attendance: 4,818; Referee: Trond Ivar Døvle

6 July 2014 14	Rosenborg	5–3	Haugesund	Trondheim
19:00 CEST (UTC+2)	Jensen 4', 75'; Søderlund 11'; Riski 78'; Pedersen 82'	Summary	Gytkjær 51', 66'; Sema 62'	Stadium: Lerkendal Stadion; Attendance: 11,068; Referee: Ken Henry Johnsen

13 July 2014 15	Haugesund	2–0	Stabæk	Haugesund
15:30 CEST (UTC+2)	Fevang 42'; Sema 58'	Summary		Stadium: Haugesund Stadion; Attendance: 4,819; Referee: Kristoffer Helgerud

20 July 2014 16	Odd	0–0	Haugesund	Skien
18:00 CEST (UTC+2)		Summary		Stadium: Skagerak Arena; Attendance: 5,728; Referee: Tommy Skjerven

27 July 2014 17	Haugesund	5–1	Start	Haugesund
15:30 CEST (UTC+2)	Gytkjær 12', 42'; Bamberg 67'; Sema 71', 88'	Summary	Hoff 11'	Stadium: Haugesund Stadion; Attendance: 4,434; Referee: Ken Henry Johnsen

3 August 2014 18	Sarpsborg 08	0–2	Haugesund	Sarpsborg
18:00 CEST (UTC+2)		Summary	Andreassen 39'; Gytkjær 50'	Stadium: Sarpsborg Stadion; Attendance: 3,637; Referee: Brage Sandmoen

10 August 2014 19	Haugesund	1–1	Viking	Haugesund
19:00 CEST (UTC+2)	Gytkjær 19'	Summary	Chikere 74'	Stadium: Haugesund Stadion; Attendance: 7,002; Referee: Ola Hobber Nilsen

16 August 2014 20	Aalesund	3–0	Haugesund	Ålesund
18:00 CEST (UTC+2)	James 13'; Ulvestad 51' (pen.); Larsen 73'	Summary		Stadium: Color Line Stadion; Attendance: 6,674; Referee: Omar Rafiq

24 August 2014 21	Haugesund	1–2	Bodø/Glimt	Haugesund
18:00 CEST (UTC+2)	Gytkjær 59'	Summary	Badou 10'; Olsen 43'	Stadium: Haugesund Stadion; Attendance: 4,839; Referee: Tommy Skjerven

31 August 2014 22	Lillestrøm	2–0	Haugesund	Lillestrøm
15:30 CEST (UTC+2)	Fofana 61'; Moen 80'	Summary		Stadium: Åråsen Stadion; Attendance: 4,759; Referee: Ola Hobber Nilsen

14 September 2014 23	Vålerenga	4–1	Haugesund	Oslo
18:00 CEST (UTC+2)	Kjartansson 32', 34', 72'; Zahid 60'	Summary	Cvetinović 48'	Stadium: Ullevaal Stadion; Attendance: 8,729; Referee: Espen Berntsen

21 September 2014 24	Haugesund	2–1	Rosenborg	Haugesund
20:00 CEST (UTC+2)	Bamberg 22'; Sema 25'	Summary	Malec 80'	Stadium: Haugesund Stadion; Attendance: 4,872; Referee: Omar Rafiq

27 September 2014 25	Sogndal	4–1	Haugesund	Sogndalsfjøra
15:30 CEST (UTC+2)	Flo 11'; Nilsen 57', 61'; Otoo 83'	Summary	Sema 45'	Stadium: Fosshaugane Campus; Attendance: 3,321; Referee: Tom Harald Hagen

5 October 2014 26	Haugesund	2–0	Sandnes Ulf	Haugesund
18:00 CEST (UTC+2)	Sema 56'; Bamberg 77'	Summary		Stadium: Haugesund Stadion; Attendance: 6,009; Referee: Brage Sandmoen

18 October 2014 27	Molde	1–2	Haugesund	Molde
18:00 CEST (UTC+2)	Chima 90+1'	Summary	Stølås 53'; Sema 67'	Stadium: Aker Stadion; Referee: Espen Berntsen

26 October 2014 28	Haugesund	3–2	Strømsgodset	Haugesund
18:00 CEST (UTC+2)	Gytkjær 42'; Cvetinović 68'; Bamberg 88'	Summary	Kovács 85', 90+2'	Stadium: Haugesund Stadion; Attendance: 5,724; Referee: Per Ivar Staberg

2 November 2014 29	Stabæk	0–1	Haugesund	Bærum
18:00 CEST (UTC+2)		Summary	Gytkjær 60' (pen.)	Stadium: Nadderud Stadion; Attendance: 3,350; Referee: Dag Vidar Hafsås

9 November 2014 30	Haugesund	2–3	Brann	Haugesund
18:00 CET (UTC+1)	Gytkjær 36'; Haraldseid 79'; Mæland (yellow card) 80'; Myrestam (yellow card) 90+4'	Summary	Huseklepp 6'; Orlov 12'; Skaanes (yellow card) 41'; Badji (yellow card) 47'; A.Vindheim (yellow card) 78' (goal) 90+11'	Stadium: Haugesund Stadion; Attendance: 8,945; Referee: Tom Harald Hagen

==== Table ====
Pos	Team	Pld	W	D	L	GF	GA	GD	Pts
9	Stabæk	30	11	6	13	44	52	−8	39
10	Viking	30	8	12	10	42	42	0	36
11	Haugesund	30	10	6	14	43	49	−6	36
12	Start	30	10	5	15	47	60	−13	35
13	Bodø/Glimt	30	10	5	15	45	60	−15	35

Source: fotball.no
Rules for classification: 1) points; 2) goal difference; 3) number of goals scored.

=== Norwegian Cup ===
24 April 2014 First Round	Åkra IL	1–2	Haugesund	Åkrehamn
18:00 CEST (UTC+2)	Rasmussen 38'	Summary	Stølås 9', 36'	Stadium: Åkra kunstgress Attendance: 1,050; Referee: Daniel Higraff

7 May 2014 Second Round	Vidar	2–3	Haugesund	Stavanger
18:00 CEST (UTC+2)	Herrem 15', 66'	Summary	Bjørnbak 48'; Stølås 51'; Myrestam 81'	Stadium: Lassa idrettspark Attendance: 300; Referee: Ole Gya

5 June 2014 Third Round	HamKam	0–1	Haugesund	Hamar
18:00 CEST (UTC+2)		Summary	Nilsen 74'	Stadium: Briskeby Arena; Attendance: 695; Referee: Espen Eskås

27 June 2014 Fourth Round	Haugesund	5–0	Tromsdalen	Haugesund
19:00 CEST (UTC+2)	Cvetinović 7'; Stølås 20', 24', 77'; Gytkjær 57'	Summary		Stadium: Haugesund Stadion; Attendance: 2,715; Referee: Tommy Skjerven

13 August 2014 Quarter-finals	Stabæk	1–0	Haugesund	Bærum
18:00 CEST (UTC+2)	Hoseth 1'	Summary		Stadium: Nadderud Stadion; Referee: Tore Hansen

=== Europa League ===
==== Qualifying phase ====
3 July 2014 1st qualifying round 1st leg	Airbus UK Broughton (Wales)	1–1	(Norway) Haugesund	Bangor, Wales
20:45 CEST (UTC+2)	Johnson 29'	Summary	Bamberg 43'	Stadium: Nantporth; Attendance: 595; Referee: Antti Munukka (Finland)

10 July 2014 1st qualifying round 2nd leg	Haugesund (Norway)	2–1 (3–2 agg.)	(Wales) Airbus UK Broughton	Haugesund, Norway
19:00 CEST (UTC+2)	Agdestein 7'; Sema 56'	Summary	Pearson 14'; J.Barrow (red card) 69'	Stadium: Haugesund Stadion; Attendance: 3,079; Referee: Fran Jović (Croatia)

17 July 2014 2nd qualifying round 1st leg	Sarajevo (Bosnia and Herzegovina)	0–1	(Norway) Haugesund	Sarajevo, Bosnia and Herzegovina
22:00 CEST (UTC+2)		Summary	Bamberg 85'	Stadium: Asim Ferhatović Hase Stadium; Attendance: 13,000; Referee: Anatolii Zhabchenko (Ukraine)

24 July 2014 2nd qualifying round 2nd leg	Haugesund (Norway)	1–3 (2–3 agg.)	(Bosnia and Herzegovina) Sarajevo	Haugesund, Norway
19:00 CEST (UTC+2)	Sema 47' (pen.)	Report	Stojčev 21'; Okić 36', 82'; Berberović (yellow card) 47' (yellow-red card) 79'	Stadium: Haugesund Stadion; Attendance: 3,976; Referee: Mihály Fábián (Hungary)

== Squad statistics ==
As of match played 9 November 2014

=== Appearances and goals ===
No.	Pos	Nat	Player	Total		Tippeligaen		Norwegian Cup		Europa League	
No.	Pos	Nat	Player	Apps	Goals	Apps	Goals	Apps	Goals	Apps	Goals
1	GK	(Norway) NOR	Per Morten Kristiansen	20	0	19	0	0	0	1	0
3	DF	(Sweden) SWE	David Myrestam	32	1	14+9	0	5	1	4	0
4	DF	(Croatia) CRO	Mirko Kramarić	5	0	1+3	0	0+1	0	0	0
6	MF	(Nigeria) NGR	Emmanuel Ekpo	3	0	1	0	0	0	2	0
7	FW	(Denmark) DEN	Christian Gytkjær	31	16	23+3	15	3	1	1+1	0
9	FW	(Serbia) SRB	Nikola Komazec	4	0	0+3	0	0+1	0	0	0
10	DF	(Norway) NOR	Joakim Våge Nilsen	38	1	30	0	4	1	1+3	0
11	DF	(Norway) NOR	Tor Arne Andreassen	37	1	28	1	2+3	0	3+1	0
12	GK	(Norway) NOR	Olav Dalen	8	0	6+1	0	1	0	0	0
13	MF	(Norway) NOR	Eirik Mæland	8	0	7	0	0+1	0	0	0
14	FW	(Norway) NOR	Torbjørn Agdestein	19	2	1+12	0	2+1	1	3	1
15	DF	(Norway) NOR	Martin Bjørnbak	17	1	11+1	0	3	1	2	0
16	MF	(Nigeria) NGR	Ugonna Anyora	24	0	13+4	0	3+1	0	3	0
17	MF	(Norway) NOR	Geir Ludvig Fevang	31	4	24+3	4	1	0	1+2	0
18	DF	(Norway) NOR	Vegard Skjerve	29	0	24	0	3+1	0	1	0
19	MF	(Norway) NOR	Kristoffer Haraldseid	35	1	22+5	1	2+2	0	3+1	0
20	FW	(Sweden) SWE	Maic Sema	34	12	21+5	10	5	0	3	2
21	FW	(Sweden) SWE	Pontus Engblom	9	1	3+4	1	1+1	0	0	0
22	MF	(Norway) NOR	Alexander Stølås	36	10	15+13	4	5	6	2+1	0
23	MF	(Brazil) BRA	Daniel Bamberg	37	7	27+3	5	3	0	3+1	2
24	GK	(Norway) NOR	Per Kristian Worre Bråtveit	12	0	5	0	4	0	3	0
26	DF	(Norway) NOR	Sverre Bjørkkjær	1	0	0	0	0+1	0	0	0
27	FW	(Norway) NOR	Tor Andre Skimmeland Aasheim	8	1	0+4	0	1+1	0	2	1
50	DF	(Serbia) SRB	Dušan Cvetinović	34	3	26	2	5	1	3	0
Players away from the club on loan:
6	MF	(Uganda) UGA	Tony Mawejje	3	0	0	0	1+1	0	1	0
Players who played for Haugesund that left during the season:
5	MF	(Slovenia) SLO	Rok Elsner	12	0	9	0	1	0	2	0

=== Goal scorers ===
Place	Position	Nation	Number	Name	Tippeligaen	Norwegian Cup	Europa League	Total
1	FW	(Denmark)	7	Christian Gytkjær	15	1	0	16
2	FW	(Sweden)	20	Maic Sema	10	0	2	12
3	MF	(Norway)	22	Alexander Stølås	4	6	0	10
4	MF	(Brazil)	23	Daniel Bamberg	5	0	2	7
5	MF	(Norway)	17	Geir Ludvig Fevang	4	0	0	4
6	FW	(Norway)	14	Torbjørn Agdestein	1	1	0	2
6	DF	(Serbia)	50	Dušan Cvetinović	1	1	0	2
8	FW	(Sweden)	21	Pontus Engblom	1	0	0	1
8	DF	(Norway)	11	Tor Arne Andreassen	1	0	0	1
8	MF	(Norway)	19	Kristoffer Haraldseid	1	0	0	1
8	DF	(Norway)	15	Martin Bjørnbak	0	1	0	1
8	DF	(Sweden)	3	David Myrestam	0	1	0	1
8	DF	(Norway)	10	Joakim Våge Nilsen	0	1	0	1
				TOTALS	42	11	5	58

=== Disciplinary record ===
Number	Nation	Position	Name	Tippeligaen		Norwegian Cup		Europa League		Total	
Number	Nation	Position	Name	Yellow card	Red card	Yellow card	Red card	Yellow card	Red card	Yellow card	Red card
3	(Sweden)	DF	David Myrestam	3	0	0	0	0	0	3	0
4	(Croatia)	DF	Mirko Kramarić	1	0	0	0	0	0	1	0
5	(Slovenia)	MF	Rok Elsner	3	0	0	0	0	0	3	0
7	(Denmark)	FW	Christian Gytkjær	0	0	0	0	1	0	1	0
9	(Serbia)	FW	Nikola Komazec	1	0	0	0	0	0	1	0
10	(Norway)	DF	Joakim Våge Nilsen	1	0	0	0	0	0	1	0
11	(Norway)	DF	Tor Arne Andreassen	6	0	1	0	1	0	8	0
13	(Norway)	MF	Eirik Mæland	1	0	0	0	0	0	1	0
14	(Norway)	FW	Torbjørn Agdestein	1	0	0	0	0	0	1	0
15	(Norway)	DF	Martin Bjørnbak	2	0	0	0	0	0	2	0
16	(Nigeria)	MF	Ugonna Anyora	5	0	0	0	1	0	6	0
17	(Norway)	MF	Geir Ludvig Fevang	3	0	0	0	0	0	3	0
18	(Norway)	DF	Vegard Skjerve	4	0	0	0	0	0	4	0
19	(Norway)	MF	Kristoffer Haraldseid	1	0	0	0	1	0	2	0
22	(Norway)	MF	Alexander Stølås	1	0	1	0	0	0	2	0
23	(Brazil)	MF	Daniel Bamberg	2	0	0	0	0	0	2	0
50	(Serbia)	DF	Dušan Cvetinović	6	0	0	0	0	0	6	0
			TOTALS	41	0	2	0	4	0	47	0
