= Hasargundgi =

- village
- Location in Karnataka, India Hasargundgi (India)
- Coordinates: 17.53043°N 77.3314899°E
- Country: India
- State: Karnataka
- District: Gulbarga
- Talukas: Chincholi

Government
  - Body: grampanchayat

Languages
  - Official: Kannada
- Time zone: UTC+5:30 (IST)
- PIN: 585306
- Vehicle registration: KA 32

Hasargundgi is a village and Grampanchayat headquarter of Hasargundgi grampanchayat, in the southern state of Karnataka, India It is located in Chincholi taluk of Kalburgi district. The nearest village is Chimmanchod.

== Demographics ==
As of 2011 India census Hasargundgi had a population of 2364 with 1177 males and 1187 females.

== Education ==
The schools in Hasargundgi are Government higher primary and high school run by Government of Karnataka India

== Agriculture ==
Major Crops produced in the Hasargundgi pare Pigeon pea, Sorghum, Pearl millet, chickpea, mung bean, vigna mungo.

== Transport ==
KSRTC bus facility is available to travel within the Karnataka state and Nabour states, to travel within 15 to 20 km, share auto available. The nearest railway station is (43 km) tandur railway station (TDU, railway station code). The nearest airport is (155 km) Rajiv Gandhi International Airport.

== See also ==
- Gulbarga
- Districts of Karnataka
