= Garampalli =

- village
- Location in Karnataka, India Garampalli (India)
- Coordinates: 17.5252300°N 77.304750°E
- Country: India
- State: Karnataka
- District: Gulbarga
- Talukas: Chincholi

Government
  - Body: grampanchayat

Languages
  - Official: Kannada
- Time zone: UTC+5:30 (IST)
- PIN: 585306.
- Vehicle registration: KA 32

Garampalli is a village in the southern state of Karnataka, India It is located in Chincholi taluk of Kalaburagi district. It belongs to karakmukli grampanchayat.And one of the basaveshwara temple is their, And yearly one time village festival takes place .In time of April–May. And in front of the basaveshwara temple, Mullamari river is passed and reach to chincholi. And this river is came from Nagaral dam(village).

== Demographics ==
As of 2011 India census Garampalli had a population of 2189 with 1082 males and 1107 females.

== Education ==
The school in Garampalli is government higher primary school Garampalli.

== Agriculture ==
Major crops produced in the Garampalli area are pigeon pea, sorghum, pearl millet, chickpea, mung bean, and vigna mungo.

== Transport ==
KSRTC bus facility is available to travel within the Karnataka state and Nabour states. The nearest railway station is (43 km) tandur railway station TDU . The nearest airport is (155 km) Rajiv Gandhi International Airport.

== See also ==
- Gulbarga
- Districts of Karnataka
