= Kodli =

Kodli kodli
- Village
- Nickname: kodli
- Location in Karnataka, India Kodli (India)
- Coordinates: 17°24′N 77°12′E
- Country: India
- State: Karnataka
- District: Gulbarga
- Talukas: Chincholi

Population (2011)
  - Total: 6,357

Languages
  - Official: Kannada
- Time zone: UTC+5:30 (IST)

Kodli is a village in the southern state of Karnataka, India It is located in the Chincholi taluk of Kalaburagi district in Karnataka.

== Demographics ==
As of 2011 India census, Kodli had a population of 6357 with 3116 males and 3241 females. This is one of the village in Chincholi which is very backward due to political carelessness. The main economic activity is agriculture. Now there are lot of young educated people who are changing the living status by going for employment to Bangalore, Hyderabad, Chennai and Mumbai.

== See also ==
- Gulbarga
- Districts of Karnataka
