= Hudadhalli =

Hudadalli
- village
- Location in Karnataka, India Hudadalli (India)
- Coordinates: 17.476073°N 77.280742°E
- Country: India
- State: Karnataka
- District: Gulbarga
- Talukas: Chincholi

Government
  - Body: grampanchayat

Languages
  - Official: Kannada
- Time zone: UTC+5:30 (IST)
- PIN: 585306.
- Vehicle registration: KA 32

Hudadalli is a village in the southern state of Karnataka, India It is located in Chincholi taluk of Kalaburagi district.

== Demographics ==
As of 2011 India census had a population of 838 with 424 males and 414 females.

== Agriculture ==
Major Crops produced in the Dhotikol are Pigeon pea, Sorghum, Pearl millet, chickpea, mung bean, vigna mungo.

== Transport ==
KSRTC bus facility is available to travel within the Karnataka state and Nabour states. The nearest railway station is (47 km) tandur railway station TDU. The nearest airport is (159 km) Rajiv Gandhi International Airport.

== See also ==
- Gulbarga
- Districts of Karnataka
