= Ratkal =

- Village
- Location in Karnataka, India Ratkal (India)
- Coordinates: 17.451696°N 77.106806°E
- Country: India
- State: Karnataka
- District: Gulbarga
- Talukas: Chincholi

Government
  - Body: grampanchayat

Population (2011)
  - Total: 4,759

Languages
  - Official: Kannada
- Time zone: UTC+5:30 (IST)
- PIN: 585322.
- Vehicle registration: KA 32

Ratkal is a village in the Indian state of Karnataka.It is located in Northern Karnataka, in Chincholi taluk of Kalburgi district.

== Demographics ==
As of 2011 India census, Ratkal had a population of 4759 with 2346 males and 2413 females.

== Education Institutions ==
The school in Ratkal are

- Government higher primary school Ratkal.
- Government high school Ratkal.

== Economy ==
Agriculture is the primary occupation in Ratkal, major Crops produce in Ratkal are Pigeon pea, Sorghum, Pearl millet, chickpea, mung bean, vigna mungo.

== Transport ==
- Bus

A KSRTC bus facility is available to travel within the Karnataka state and Nabor states.

- Rail

Kalaburagi railway station is the nearest station to Ratkal.

- Airport

Rajiv Gandhi International Airport Hyderabad is near to Ratkal.
