= Mayanja Kyompitira Sebalu =

Ugandan politician

Mayanja Kyompitira Sebalu (born 1931 at Nagalama, Kyagwe North East, Mukono District) is a Ugandan lawyer and politician. In 1961, Sebalu served under Benedicto Kiwanuka as the first finance minister of the country.

== Biography ==
He was educated at Namilyango College, then went on to study in India at Punjab University, Calcutta University, and Delhi University, where he acquired degrees in economics (1956) and law (1958).

When Sebalu returned to Uganda, he and Benedicto Kiwanuka started a law firm. The two worked together and later Kiwanuka became the Democratic Party president.

As a lawyer, Sebalu stood for the 1961 Ugandan general election where he was elected to represent Kyaggwe North East in the Parliament of Uganda under the Democratic Party. With a large majority in parliament, Kiwanuka as Democratic Party's] leader had to form a government and Sebalu was named Minister of Economic Development. The Democratic Party attained 44 seats of the available 82.

As he progressed with his ministerial duties, after less than a year Sebalu took over from Christopher George Melmoth as Minister of Finance making him the first Finance Minister of Uganda. After being defeated in the hotly contested 1962 Ugandan general election, Sebalu lost his seat in cabinet and his private legal practice after Independence.
