= Ainoli =

- Village
- Interactive map of Ainoli
- Country: India
- State: Karnataka
- District: Gulbarga
- Talukas: Chincholi

Population (2011)
  - Total: 5,363

Languages
  - Official: Kannada
- Time zone: UTC+5:30 (IST)
- PIN: 585307

Ainoli is a village in the southern state of Karnataka, India. It is located in the Chincholi taluk of Kalaburagi district in Karnataka.

== Demographics ==
As of 2011 India census, Ainoli had a population of 5363 with 2693 males and 2670 females.

It is located near Chincholi which is 5 km away from Chincholi and 90 km from Gulbarga which is its district. There are three major castes like Veerashaiva Lingayat, Muslim, Kabbaliga and marginally Kuruba Scheduled Castes and Scheduled Tribes are also present. It is surrounded by Chincholi reserve forest in its east.

== Education facilities ==
It has a government school up to 10th standard (SSLC) and one private school named "Basava Jyoti" up to 7th standard.
