= Hassan Wasswa =

Ugandan footballer (born 1988)

Personal information
- Full name: Hassan Mawanda Wasswa
- Date of birth: 14 February 1988 (age 38)
- Place of birth: Nsambya, Uganda
- Height: 1.73 m (5 ft 8 in)
- Position: Defensive midfielder

Senior career*
Years	Team	Apps	(Gls)
2006–2007	Kampala City		
2007–2008	Saint George S.C.		
2008–2009	F.C. Cape Town		
2009–2010	Karabükspor	31	(1)
2010–2011	Altay	26	(0)
2011–2012	Kayseri Erciyesspor	21	(0)
2012–2013	Kampala City		
2013–2014	Đồng Nai F.C.		
2014–2015	SC Villa		
2015–2016	Al-Shorta		
2016–2017	Al-Nejmeh	0	(0)
2017–2018	Tala'ea El Gaish	18	(0)
2019–2022	Jeddah	0	(0)

International career
2006–2021	Uganda	75	(0)
- * Club domestic league appearances and goals

Hassan Mawanda Wasswa (born 14 February 1988) is a Ugandan former professional footballer who played as a defensive midfielder. He made 75 appearances the Uganda national team.

== Club career ==
On 4 January 2017, Wasswa moved to Lebanese Premier League club Nejmeh. However, due to injury problems, he did not feature for the club. In August 2019, Wasswa joined Saudi Arabian club Jeddah Club.

== International career ==
Wasswa retired from international football in April 2021 after 13 years with the Uganda national team. He made with 75 appearances for the Uganda Cranes.

== Style of play ==
Mostly a defensive midfielder, Wasswa was also deployed at centre-back.

== After retirement ==
On 25 February 2024, Wasswa featured in Kiwanuka Sulaiman's friendly featuring Uganda national team ex-internationals and the Nakifuma Select FC which was played at Kikube Playground in Nakifuma alongside other players including captain Tony Mawejje. In the game he scored a brace as the Uganda side won 3–1 with another goal coming from Hassan Mubiru. Abbey Oketcho scored a consolation for the home team.

== Career statistics ==
Appearances and goals by national team and year
National team	Year	Apps	Goals
Uganda	2006	8	0
Uganda	2007	0	0
Uganda	2008	0	0
Uganda	2009	0	0
Uganda	2010	1	0
Uganda	2011	3	0
Uganda	2012	12	0
Uganda	2013	9	0
Uganda	2014	6	0
Uganda	2015	4	0
Uganda	2016	8	0
Uganda	2017	11	0
Uganda	2018	7	0
Uganda	2019	6	0
Total		75	0

== Honours ==
Saint George

- Ethiopian Premier League: 2007–08

Karabükspor

- TFF First League: 2009–10
