= Nidugunda =

- village
- Country: India
- State: Karnataka
- District: Gulbarga
- Talukas: Chincholi

Population (2001)
  - Total: 5,775

Languages
  - Official: Kannada
- Time zone: UTC+5:30 (IST)

Nidugunda is a village in the southern state of Karnataka, India. It is located in the Chincholi taluk of Kalaburagi district.

== Demographics ==
As of 2001 India census, Nidugunda had a population of 5775 with 2889 males and 2886 females.

== See also ==
- Gulbarga
- Districts of Karnataka
