= Kupnoor =

- Village
- Location in Karnataka
- Coordinates: 17°21′N 77°09′E
- Country: India
- State: Karnataka
- District: Gulbarga
- Taluk: Chincholi

Languages
  - Official: Kannada (ಕನ್ನಡ)
- PIN: 585324

Kupnoor is a village in Chincholi Taluk in Gulbarga District of Karnataka, India. It comes under Kupnoor Panchayath and belongs to Gulbarga Division . It is located 74 km towards East from District headquarters Gulbarga and 585 km from State capital Bangalore.

== Importance ==
Kupnoor (ಕುಪನೂರ) is known for Lord Mallikarjun Temple. Temple celebrates number of festivals and Annual Jatra (ಜಾತ್ರೆ ) is celebrated during Makar Sankranti which is unique among all the festivals. Temple attracts several hundred devotees from the surrounding villages.

== Demographics ==
Kannada is the Local Language here. Total population of Kupnoor is 1694 as per Population Census 2011. Males are 851 and Females are 843 living in 316 Houses.
