= Dhotikol, Chincholi =

Dhotikol
- village
- Location in Karnataka, India Dhotikol (India)
- Coordinates: 17.5252300°N 77.304750°E
- Country: India
- State: Karnataka
- District: Gulbarga
- Talukas: Chincholi

Government
  - Body: grampanchayat

Languages
  - Official: Kannada
- Time zone: UTC+5:30 (IST)
- PIN: 585306.
- Vehicle registration: KA 32

Dhotikol is a village in the southern state of Karnataka, India It is located in Chincholi taluk of Kalaburagi district. It belongs to karakmukli grampanchayat.

== Demographics ==
As of 2011 India census Dhotikol had a population of 1461 with 679 males and 782 females.

== Agriculture ==
Major Crops produced in the Dhotikol are Pigeon pea, Sorghum, Pearl millet, chickpea, mung bean, vigna mungo.

== Transport ==
KSRTC bus facility is available to travel within the Karnataka state and Nabour states. The nearest railway station is (47 km) tandur railway station TDU . The nearest airport is (159 km) Rajiv Gandhi International Airport.

== See also ==
- Gulbarga
- Districts of Karnataka
