= Khudavandpur, Chincholi =

Khudavandpur
- village
- Location in Karnataka, India Khudavandpur (India)
- Coordinates: 17.5252300°N 77.304750°E
- Country: India
- State: Karnataka
- District: Gulbarga
- Talukas: Chincholi

Government
  - Body: grampanchayat

Languages
  - Official: Kannada
- Time zone: UTC+5:30 (IST)
- PIN: 585306.
- Vehicle registration: KA 32

Khudavandpur is a village in the southern state of Karnataka, India It is located in Chincholi taluk of Kalaburagi district. It belongs to karakmukli grampanchayat.

== Demographics ==
As of 2011 India census Khudavandpur had a population of 556 with 285 males and 271 females.

== Agriculture ==
Major crops produced in the Garampalli are pigeon pea, sorghum, pearl millet, chickpea, mung bean, vigna mungo.

== Transport ==
KSRTC bus facility is available to travel within the Karnataka state and Nabour states. The nearest railway station is (46 km) tandur railway station TDU. The nearest airport is (158 km) Rajiv Gandhi International Airport.

== See also ==
- Gulbarga
- Districts of Karnataka
