= Sulepeth =

- Town
- Country: India
- State: Karnataka
- District: Gulbarga
- Talukas: Chincholi

Population (2001)
  - Total: 6,707

Languages
  - Official: Kannada
- Time zone: UTC+5:30 (IST)

Sulepeth is a town in the southern state of Karnataka, India. It is located in the Chincholi taluk of Kalaburagi district in Karnataka. It is 73 km distance from its Headquarter Gulbarga And Extends same Distance to another District Bidar. Sulepeth is famous for Lord Veerbhadreshwar. The Jatra (Festival) starts on Ugadi (New Year for Karnataka) and ends after exactly 30 Days of celebration. Jatra is very special and famous in surroundings.Thousands of people come to visit the celebration on its final day from surrounding places.

== Demographics ==
As of 2001 India census, Sulepeth had a population of 6707 with 3380 males and 3327 females.

== See also ==
- Gulbarga
- Districts of Karnataka
