= Naggalama Hospital =

Private, faith-based community hospital in Uganda

- Roman Catholic Diocese of Lugazi

Geography
- Location: Naggalama, Mukono District, Central Region, Uganda
- Coordinates: 00°31′30″N 32°46′57″E

Organisation
- Care system: Private, Non-profit
- Type: General, Community

Services
- Emergency department: I
- Beds: 100

History
- Founded: 1906

Links
- Other links: Hospitals in Uganda

Naggalama Hospital, whose full name is St. Francis Hospital, Naggalama, is a hospital in Naggalama, Mukono District, in the Central Region of Uganda. It is a private, non-profit, faith-based community hospital, owned by the Roman Catholic Diocese of Lugazi.

== Location ==
The hospital is located along the Mukono–Kayunga–Njeru Road, approximately 24 kilometres (15 mi), north of the city of Mukono, where the district headquarters are located. This location is about 29 kilometres (18 mi), southwest of Kayunga General Hospital, in the town of Kayunga.

Naggalama Hospital is located approximately 40 kilometres (25 mi), by road, northeast of Mulago National Referral Hospital, in Kampala, Uganda's capital and largest city. The geographical coordinates of Naggalama Hospital are: 0°31'30.0"N, 32°46'57.0"E (Latitude:0.525000; Longitude:32.782500).

== Overview ==
Nagalama hospital is a private, non-profit, rural, community hospital, owned by the Roman Catholic Diocese of Lugazi. The hospital is accredited by the Uganda Catholic Medial Bureau and is administered by the Little Sisters of St. Francis. The planned bed capacity of the hospital is 100. Like most community hospitals in Uganda, Nagalama Hospital operates under severe constraints of staffing and funding. The hospital charges fees for treatment, but no one is turned away because of inability to pay. Funding for the hospital is dependent on service fees, donations from within Uganda and overseas, support from the Catholic Church and subsidies from the Ugandan Government.

== Administration ==
The hospital is managed by Sr Jane Frances Nakafeero, of the Little Sisters of St. Francis, since May 2013. Sr Jane has been improving the hospital buildings, the staff and their living accommodation, the presence of a comfortable guesthouse for doctors and professors donating their expertise and a student house for exchange students from abroad. A new private maternity ward has been added, as well as a well equipped ambulance with oxygen, intravenous fluids, heart monitor and a cardiac defibrillator. The children's ward has a special recreation room for children who are able to move around. The hospital raised funds to build a new surgical ward. In 2013, the hospital established a Palliative Care Service, for the chronically terminally ill, who voluntarily enroll in the program.

== See also ==
- Hospitals in Uganda
