= Nagalama =

- Map of Uganda showing the location of Nagalama.
- Coordinates: 00°30′54″N 32°46′12″E
- Country: Uganda
- Region: Central Region, Uganda
- District: Mukono District
- Elevation: 1,180 m (3,870 ft)
- Time zone: UTC+3 (EAT)

Nagalama, whose correct phonetic spelling is Naggalama is a town in Uganda's Central Region.

== Location ==
Nagalama is located in Mukono District, on the Kalagi-Kayunga Road, approximately 6 kilometres (3.7 mi), by road, southwest of the larger, neighboring town of Nakifuma, where the county headquarters are located. This location is approximately 22 kilometres (14 mi), by road, north of Mukono, where the district headquarters are located. Nagalama is situated approximately 38 kilometres (24 mi), by road, northeast of Kampala, Uganda's capital and largest city.

== Population ==
As of May 2011, the exact population of Nagalama is not publicly known.

== Landmarks ==
The landmarks within or near Nagalama include:

- The offices of Nagalama Town Council
- St. Francis Hospital Nagalama – a 100-bed community hospital, affiliated with the Roman Catholic Diocese of Lugazi
- Nagalama Central Market
- Nagalama Catholic Church
- St. Joseph's Primary School – A public, non-residential elementary school (Grades 1–7)
- St. Joseph's Senior Secondary School – A public non-residential middle and high school (Grades 8–13)
- The Kalagi-Kayunga Road – The all-weather tarmac road passes through Nagalama in a Northeast to Southwest direction.

== See also ==
- Mukono District
- Mukono
- Nakifuma
- Nagalama Hospital
- Central Region, Uganda
