= Kiwanuka Sulaiman =

Ugandan politician and footballer (born 1982)

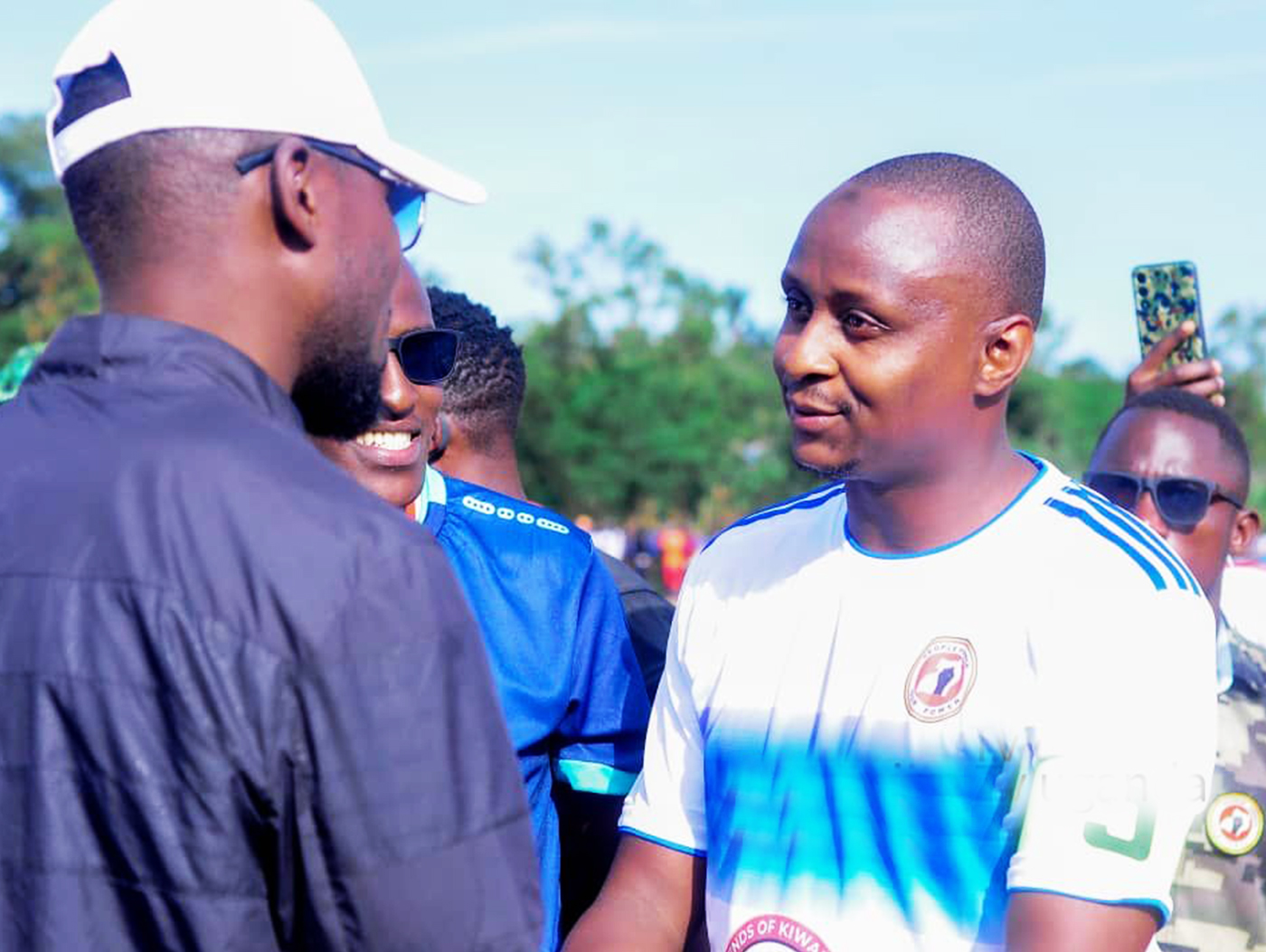
- Sulaiman in 2023
- Nominated by: National Unity Platform
- Constituency: Nakifuma

Personal details
- Born: 20 September 1982 (age 44) Wanjeyo, Nakifuma
- Citizenship: Uganda
- Party: National Unity Platform
- Occupation: Politician, businessman

Kiwanuka Sulaiman (born 20 September 1982) is a Ugandan politician, businessman and former professional football player who played as a striker for Express FC and Tooro United F.C. before his career was cut short by injuries. He later became the owner of The Spartans FC. He is a son to former motorsport administrator, the late Hajji Juma Nkambwe, who lived at Wanjeyo.

He is a member of Parliament for Nakifuma county.

He was born in 1982 at Nakifuma, Kinyonyi to Hajjat Hadijah Namatovu.

== Early life and education ==
Sulaiman was born to Hajji Juma Nkambwe and Hajjat Hadijah Namatovu. After his birth, he didn't spend much time with his mother who had to continue with her studies. He was left with his Grandmother Nanfuka Walia who stayed in Bweyogerere.

He attended early education at Nursery Ku Muzikiti in Bweyogerere before joining Hassan Trabih for primary one to seven. For his secondary education, he joined Bweyogerere Secondary School for senior one and two. Since he was a footballer, his mentorship coach Kaddu Badru moved with him through three different school including Naggalama Islamic, Kasawo Secondary School and Later Namagabi Secondary School - Kayunga where he achieved his ordinary level Certificate of Education. He rejoined Namagabi Secondary School, Kayunga for an Advanced Certificate of Education by Headteacher Yusuf Kinene and became a sports prefect during the time.

He studied BCOM External from Makerere University.

== Football administration ==
During his time as a director at The Spartans FC in 2018, he had a disagreement with the Federation of Uganda Football Associations over the transfer of Isaac Ogwang from SC Villa and led to the dismissal of The Spartans FC from FUFA Competitions.

He is the founder of Ekibbiitu ky'ebyemizannyo in Nakifuma, taking place at the end of every year. Many sports activities take place in a dream to make Nakifuma "Uganda's Brazil'.

In December 2021, Sulaiman organized a Boxing Day free event at Kimenyedde, in which he injected 12 million Ugandan shillings prize money for different sports disciplines like boxing, athletics, wrestling, dancing, netball, bicycle races and football. It gathered audiences from Nagojje, Ntunda, Kimenyedde, Kasawo, Seeta, Kabimbiri, Namuganga, Naggalama and Namataba. Kimenyedde Select FC won in the football category against The Spartans FC 4-2 on penalties after a 1-1 draw in normal time. Baka Ocheng scored a late equalizer for Kimenyedde Select after a lead from Emma Kalyowa to win 1 million Ugandan shillings prize money.

== Buganda Masaza sponsorship ==
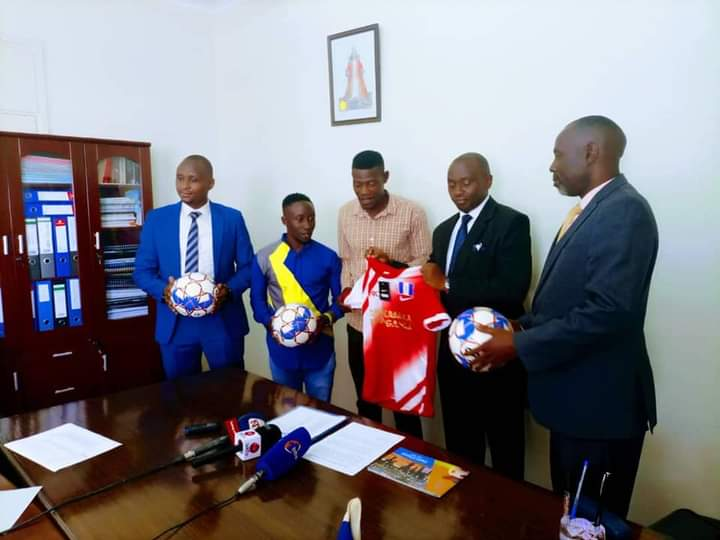
Kiwanuka Sulaiman being unveiled as Team Manager for Buganda Masaza select in 2022

He became part of Masaza committee in 2021 when he joined Ssaza Kyaggwe and since then, he has been an official individual sponsor of the entire tournament. He was recognized as one of the key people in supporting Masaza competitions. In Masaza 2021, he injected $1900 (6,650,000/= Uganda Shillings) to Ssaza Kyaggwe despite their quarter final dismiss.

== Political life ==
He was in the race for Nakifuma Member of Parliament in 2021 as an independent candidate and lost to National Unity Platform flag bearer Fred Ssimbwa. Kiwanuka contributed to building a police post in Kateete

== Friends of Kiwanuka organization projects ==
Agriculture and farming

Friends Of Kiwanuka Organization is a charity that was established in 2021 by Hon. Kiwanuka Sulaiman to make contributions to Greater Mukono Community. The charity projects have included supporting farmers and agriculturalists with seeds and other equipment. In September 2022, two counties in Greater Mukono, Nakifuma and Namuganga, received maize seeds for over 100 farmers worth 10 million Ugandan shillings as empowerment to their farming projects.

School Sports Development Kasawo Secondary School, Kigayaza, Namagabi secondary school, Kayunga, Latifah Mixed Secondary School, Kabimba are among the schools empowered through sports structures. In March 2022, Kasawo Secondary School received four football balls, 50 bags of cement and a brand new jersey attached with 1 Million Uganda Shillings after their friendly against The Spartans FC.

Sports Achievements

In 2021, Kiwanuka donated $400 to Ugandan skipper Fauzia Najjemba, who is also a born talent of Nakifuma, as thanks for raising Nakifuma on a National level. Fauzia was featuring for Kampala Queens WFC in the FUFA Women Super League. Kiwanuka Sulaiman dreamt of making Nakifuma "The Brazil of Uganda and in doing so; has promoted and empowered talents to give the exposure. In February 2024, hosted the Uganda Cranes Ex-Internationals at Kikube playground in Nakifuma for a friendly game against Nakifuma Select Fc which featured some of the National team talents with the likes of Tony Mawejje, Geofrey Massa, Yunus Sentamu, Joseph Kizito, Moses Waiswa among others.

Nsaji Sports Complex

Kiwanuka is currently building a sports facility that was started in 2022, under the name of Nsaji Sports Complex, based in Nsaji, Nakifuma, seated on a 7-acre ground to accommodate sports activities on an international level. Nsaji Sports Complex is expected to open in 2029.

== See also ==
- Bobi Wine
- National Unity Platform
