= Chimmaidlai =

- village
- Location in Karnataka, India Chimmaidlai (India)
- Coordinates: 17.435539°N 77.372638°E
- Country: India
- State: Karnataka
- District: Gulbarga
- Talukas: Chincholi

Government
  - Body: grampanchayat

Population (2011)
  - Total: 3,071

Languages
  - Official: Kannada
- Time zone: UTC+5:30 (IST)
- PIN: 585307
- Vehicle registration: KA 32

Chimmaidlai is a village in the southern state of Karnataka, India. It is located in Chincholi taluk of Kalburgi district. According to the 2011 census of India, this village has population of 3071, where 1555 are males and 1516 are females.

== Education Institutions ==
The school in Chimmaidlai is

- Government higher primary school chimmaidlai.

== Agriculture ==
Major crops produced in Chimmaidlai are Pigeon pea, Sorghum, Pearl millet, chickpea, mung bean, vigna mungo.

== Transport ==
KSRTC bus facility available to travel within the Karnataka state and nabor states. The nearest railway station is (37 km) Tandur railway station and nearest airport is (150 km) Rajiv Gandhi International Airport Hyderabad.
