= Nakifuma =

- Map of Uganda showing the location of Nakifuma.
- Coordinates: 00°32′27″N 32°47′24″E
- Country: Uganda
- Region: Central Uganda
- District: Mukono District

Government
  - Chairman LC 1: NSUBUGA MOSES
- Elevation: 1,160 m (3,810 ft)

Population (2024 Census)
  - Total: 66,547
- Time zone: UTC+3 (EAT)

Nakifuma is a town in the Central Region of Uganda.

== Location ==
Nakifuma lies in Nakifuma sub-county, Kyaggwe County, in Mukono District. The town is located on the main highway from Kampala, through Gayaza, Kalagi and on to Kayunga. This location lies approximately 26 kilometres (16 mi), by road, northeast of Mukono, where the district headquarters are located. and approximately 46 kilometres (29 mi), by road, northeast of Kampala, Uganda's capital and largest city. The road leading in and out of Nakifuma is an all-weather tarmac highway. The coordinates of Nakifuma are:0°32'27.0"N, 32°47'24.0"E (Latitude:0.5408; Longitude:32.7900).

== Overview ==
Nakifuma is the location of the headquarters of Nakifuma sub-county, one of the two sub-counties in Mukono District. The other sub-county in the district is Mukono sub-county, where the town of Mukono is located. Nakifuma Central market is the largest fresh-food market in the town.

== Population ==
At the 2024 census Nakifuma had a population of 66,547.

== Points of interest ==
The following points of interest lie within town or close to its borders:

- The offices of Nakifuma Town Council
- The offices of Nakifuma County, one of the constituent counties of Mukono District.
- Nakifuma Central Market
- Nakifuma Police Station
- Mukono Technical Business Institute (Nakiwaate Zone - Nakifuma Town)
- The Kalagi-Kayunga Road - The all-weather, tarmac road passes through Nakifuma in a Northeast to Southwest direction.

== See also ==
- Mukono District
- Mukono
- Nagalama
- Kalagi
- Central Uganda
