= Kanakpur, Chincholi =

Kanakpur,Chincholi
- village
- Location in Karnataka, India Kanakpur,Chincholi (India)
- Coordinates: 17.471704°N 77.323515°E
- Country: India
- State: Karnataka
- District: Gulbarga
- Talukas: Chincholi

Government
  - Body: grampanchayat

Languages
  - Official: Kannada
- Time zone: UTC+5:30 (IST)
- PIN: 585306.
- Vehicle registration: KA 32
- lok sabha: Bidar (Lok Sabha constituency)
- Vidhan Sabha: Chincholi

Kanakpur, is a grampanchayat headquarter village in the southern state of Karnataka, India, this village previously called with name Karakmukli. It is located in the Chincholi taluk of Kalaburagi district.

== Demographics ==
As of 2011 India census Karakmukli had a population of 2185 with 1072 males and 1113 females.

== Education Institutions ==
Schools in kanakpur are

- Government higher primary school kanakpur
- Government high school kanakpur

For further studies students need to travel (13 km) from kanakpur.

- Govt first grade college chincholi.
- HKES's Smt. C.B. Patil Arts & Commerce Degree College, Chincholi.
- Siddarath college of education chincholi.
- Govt first grade college sulepeth.
- Government Industrial training institute, chincholi.

To study technical education Diploma and Engineering student need to travel or stay 40 to 80 km, of nearer cities Humnabad, Kalagi, Gulbarga, Bidar.

== Universities ==
The nearest universities are Gulbarga University and Central University of Karnataka

== Agriculture ==
Major Crops produced in the Karakmukli are Pigeon pea, Sorghum, Pearl millet, chickpea, mung bean, vigna mungo.

== Transport ==
KSRTC bus facility is available to travel within the Karnataka state and Nabour states, to travel within 15 to 20 km, share auto available. The nearest railway station is (43 km) tandur railway station TDU and Sedam railway station. The nearest domestic airport is Gulbarga Airport and Rajiv Gandhi International Airport (155 km) is the international airport.

== See also ==
- Gulbarga
- Districts of Karnataka
- State Highway 75 (Karnataka)
