= Kalagi, Mubende =

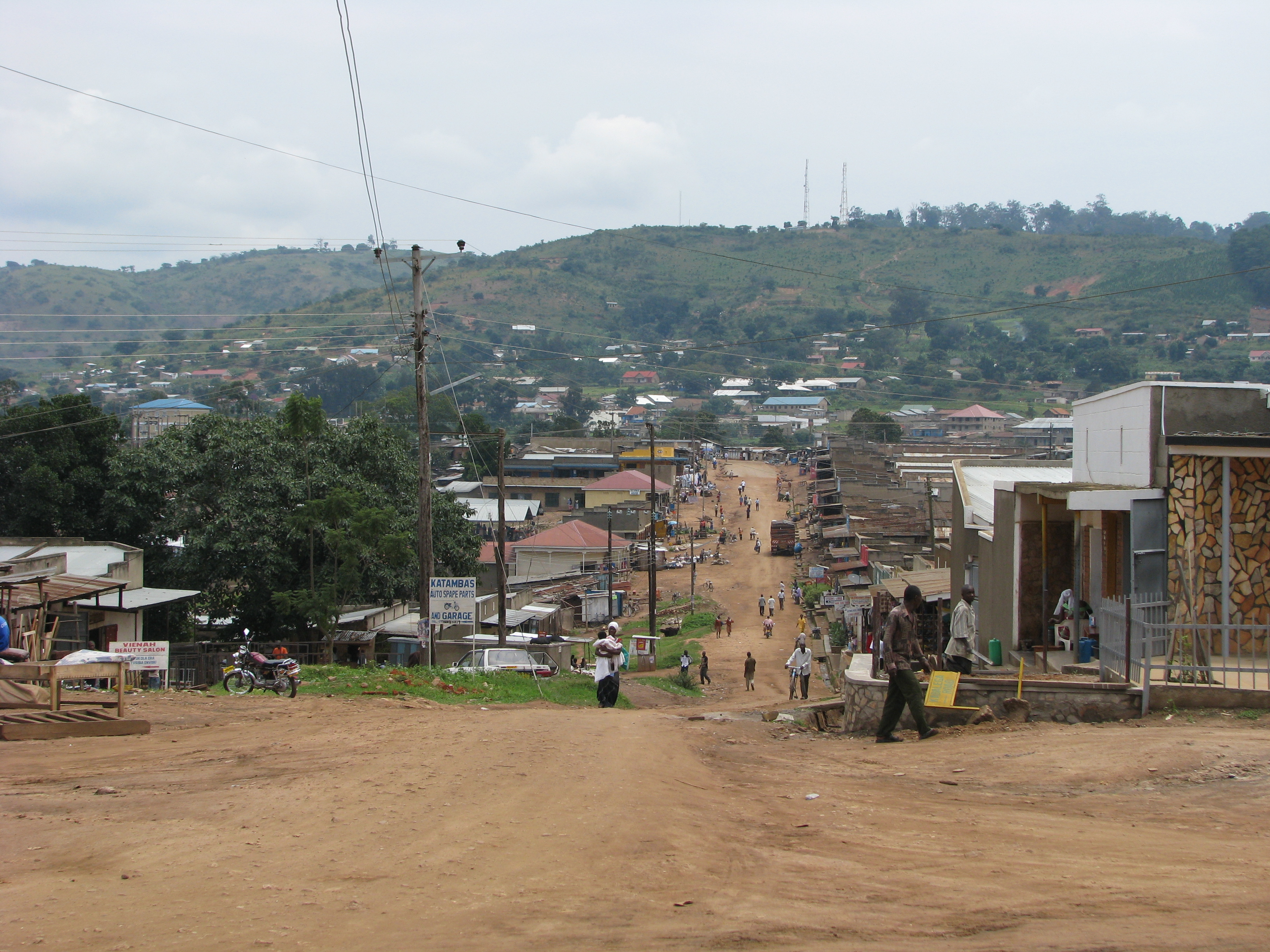

- Location in Uganda
- Coordinates: 00°31′01″N 31°38′56″E
- Country: Uganda
- District: Mubende District

Kalagi is a settlement in Mubende District in Central Uganda.

== Location ==
The settlement is located approximately 39 kilometres (24 mi) east of Mubende, where the district headquarters are situated. Kalagi is approximately 129 kilometres (80 mi) by road, west of Kampala, Uganda's capital and largest city. The road is an all-weather tarmac highway between Kampala and Mubende. The small village was a coffee growing area in the 1950s and 60s, and is dominated by the family of the late Yosiya Baale of the Nyange clan. He was succeeded by his third son, David Livingstone Seruwu, who died in 2017. The coordinates of Kalagi, Mubende are:0°31'01.0"N, 31°38'56.0"E (Latitude:0.516944; Longitude:31.648889).

== See also ==
- List of cities and towns in Uganda
