= Kodambal =

- village
- Location in Karnataka, India Kodambal (India)
- Coordinates: 17.77°N 77.14°E
- Country: India
- State: Karnataka
- District: Bidar
- Talukas: Homnabad

Population (2001)
  - Total: 5,543

Languages
  - Official: Kannada
- Time zone: UTC+5:30 (IST)
- Postal code: 585412
- Vehicle registration: KA 39

Kodambal is a village in the southern state of Karnataka, India. It is located in the Chitguppa taluk of Bidar district in Karnataka.

== Demographics ==
As of 2001 India census, Kodambal had a population of 5,543, with 2,801 males and 2,742 females.

== Education ==
Government primary school, Government High school, Govt Girls Hostel.Government Urdu primary school

== Politics ==
Present Gram Panchayat Chairwoman: Shri. Rangamma. Present Taluka Panchayat member: Mr. Beerappa Marthand. PDO: Sangamesh.

== See also ==
- Bidar
- Districts of Karnataka
