= Shahrak-e Taleqani, Andika =

Shahrak-e Taleqani شهرك طالقاني
- Village
- Location within Iran
- Coordinates: 32°03′07″N 49°25′37″E
- Country: Iran
- Province: Khuzestan
- County: Andika
- Bakhsh: Abezhdan
- Rural District: Abezhdan

Population (2006)
  - Total: 217
- Time zone: UTC+3:30 (IRST)
  - Summer (DST): UTC+4:30 (IRDT)

Shahrak-e Taleqani (Persian: شهرك طالقاني, also Romanized as Shahrak-e Ţāleqānī; also known as Khodā Bandeh) is a village in Abezhdan Rural District, Abezhdan District, Andika County, Khuzestan Province, Iran. At the 2006 census, its population was 217, in 40 families.
