= Tony Mawejje =

Ugandan footballer (born 1986)

Personal information
- Date of birth: 15 December 1986 (age 39)
- Place of birth: Masaka, Uganda
- Height: 1.80 m (5 ft 11 in)
- Position: Midfielder

Youth career
- –2003: Masaka Local Council

Senior career*
Years	Team	Apps	(Gls)
2004–2005	Kampala City Council		
2006–2007	Police FC		
2008–2009	Uganda Revenue Authority		
2009–2013	ÍBV Vestmannaeyjar	106	(10)
2012	→ Golden Arrows (loan)	1	(0)
2014	Haugesund	0	(0)
2014	→ Valur (loan)	11	(1)
2015–2017	Þróttur	16	(0)
2017–2019	Tirana	52	(2)
2019	Al-Arabi SC	1	(0)
2020–2022	Police FC		

International career
2004–2018	Uganda	83	(8)

Managerial career
- 2023–2024: Kampala Queens FC
- 2024-2025: Wakiso Giants FC
- 2025-2026: ST Noa Girls
- 2026-present: Muteesa I Royal University
- * Club domestic league appearances and goals

Anthony Mawejje Jr. (born 15 December 1986) is a Ugandan former professional footballer who played as a midfielder. He made 83 appearances for the Uganda national team.

== Club career ==
Mawejje signed a two-year contract with Norwegian Tippeligaen club Haugesund ahead of the 2014 season. In July 2014, after only three appearances for Haugesund, Mawejje moved to Valur on loan. On 27 January 2015, Mawejje became a free agent.

Mawejje joined Police FC of the Uganda Premier League in July 2020.

=== Tirana ===
In July Mawejje joined Tirana in Albania and made his debut on 6 September 2017 in a win against FK Kukësi where he played the entire match. Tony scored his first goal for Tirana on 16 September 2017 against KS Iliria; Tirana won 1–0.

== International career ==
Mawejje featured for the Uganda national team for 15 years career earning 83 appearances and 8 goals until he retired in May 2022. He was one of the players who helped Uganda Cranes qualify for the 2017 Africa Cup of Nations in Gabon. Uganda did not got out of Group D. They returned in AFCON 2019 and carried Uganda until the Round Of 16 under coach Sébastien Desabre. That was Mawejje's last Africa Cup Of Nations tournament being that Uganda never qualified again until his retirement in 2022.

Mawejje is most remembered for his lone strike against Comoros in Afcon qualifiers 2017 as Uganda won 1–0 on 5 September 2015. He had almost spent eight months away from the national team.

== Managerial career ==
Mawejje began a coaching course through FUFA and was later announced as assistant coach at Uganda women club Kampala Queens WFC replacing Kato Alimiya Ssenyange who had left the club in at the end of 2022–23 season. He worked with coach Charles Ssenyange Kadiidi through the 2023–24 season who was also later replaced by Charles Ayiekoh Lukula after five months.

Following the departure of John Ayala Luyinda as a head coach at Wakiso Giants FC, Mawejje and Steven Bengo took over the positions where Tonny became the assistant coach at the club in 14 July 2024. In September, 2025, Mawejje became the new head coach for FUFA Women Super League club ST Noa Girls replacing Jimmy Kintu who had joined Calvary FC. One year later during September, 2026, became the new head coach of Muteesa I Royal University where he replaced George William Ssengabi.

== Other activities after retirement ==
Mawejje played alongside other former Uganda international players in Kiwanuka Sulaiman's friendly against Nakifuma Select FC on 25 February 2024 at Kikube Playground in Nakifuma. The Uganda Cranes ex-internationals won 3–1 courtesy of goals by Hassan Wasswa, who scored a brace, and a penalty from Hassan Mubiru. Abbey Oketcho scored a consolation for the home team.

== Career statistics ==
=== Club ===
Appearances and goals by club, season and competition
Club	Season	League			National cup		League cup		Continental		Total	
Club	Season	Division	Apps	Goals	Apps	Goals	Apps	Goals	Apps	Goals	Apps	Goals
ÍBV Vestmannaeyjar	2009	Úrvalsdeild	21	2	2	1	0	0	–		23	3
ÍBV Vestmannaeyjar	2010	Úrvalsdeild	22	2	1	0	6	0	–		29	2
ÍBV Vestmannaeyjar	2011	Úrvalsdeild	21	1	4	0	5	0	2	0	32	1
ÍBV Vestmannaeyjar	2012	Úrvalsdeild	21	3	0	0	0	0	2	0	23	3
ÍBV Vestmannaeyjar	2013	Úrvalsdeild	21	2	2	0	0	0	4	0	21	2
ÍBV Vestmannaeyjar	Total		106	10	9	1	11	0	8	0	134	11
Golden Arrows (loan)	2011–12	Premier Soccer League	1	0					–		1	0
Haugesund	2014	Tippeligaen	0	0	2	0	–		1	0	3	0
Valur (loan)	2014	Úrvalsdeild	11	1	0	0	0	0	–		11	1
Þróttur	2015	1. deild karla	10	0	0	0	0	0	–		10	0
Þróttur	2016	Úrvalsdeild	6	0	3	0	0	0	–		9	0
Þróttur	Total		16	0	3	0	0	0	0	0	19	0
KF Tirana	2017–18	Kategoria e Parë	21	1	5	0	0	0	1 (Note: Appearance in Albanian Supercup)	0	27	1
KF Tirana	2018–19	Kategoria Superiore	31	0	8	0	0	0	0	0	39	0
KF Tirana	Total		52	1	13	0	0	0	1	0	66	1
Career total			186	12	27	1	11	0	10	0	234	14

=== International ===
Appearances and goals by national team and year
National team	Year	Apps	Goals
Uganda	2003	2	0
Uganda	2004	2	0
Uganda	2005	3	0
Uganda	2007	3	0
Uganda	2008	1	0
Uganda	2009	10	3
Uganda	2010	8	1
Uganda	2011	10	0
Uganda	2012	5	0
Uganda	2013	4	2
Uganda	2014	10	1
Uganda	2015	3	1
Uganda	2016	10	0
Uganda	2017	6	0
Uganda	2020	2	0
Total		79	8

Scores and results list Uganda's goal tally first, score column indicates score after each Mawejje goal.

List of international goals scored by Tony Mawejje
No.	Date	Venue	Opponent	Score	Result	Competition
1	1 January 2009	National Stadium, Kampala, Uganda	Rwanda	1–0	4–0	2008 CECAFA
2	7 January 2009	National Stadium, Kampala, Uganda	Somalia	2–0	4–0	2008 CECAFA
3	7 January 2009	National Stadium, Kampala, Uganda	Somalia	3–0	4–0	2008 CECAFA
4	12 December 2010	National Stadium, Dar es Salaam, Tanzania	Ethiopia	3–2	3–4	2010 CECAFA
5	8 June 2013	National Stadium, Kampala, Uganda	Liberia	1–0	1–0	2014 FIFA World Cup qualification
6	15 June 2013	National Stadium, Kampala, Uganda	Angola	2–1	2–1	2014 FIFA World Cup qualification
7	6 September 2014	Baba Yara Stadium, Kumasi, Ghana	Ghana	1–1	1–1	2015 Africa Cup of Nations qualification
8	5 September 2015	Stade Said Mohamed Cheikh, Mitsamiouli, Comoros	Comoros	1–0	1–0	2017 Africa Cup of Nations qualification

== Honours ==
Tirana

- Albanian Supercup: 2017
- Albanian First Division: Winner Group B
- Albanian First Division: 2017–18

Police FC

- Kagame Interclub Cup: 2006

Uganda Revenue Authority

- Uganda Super League: 2008–09

Uganda

- CECAFA Senior Challenge Cup: three times

== See Also ==
- Kampala Queens FC
- Kiwanuka Sulaiman
- Police FC
