= Emmanuel Ekpo =

Nigerian footballer

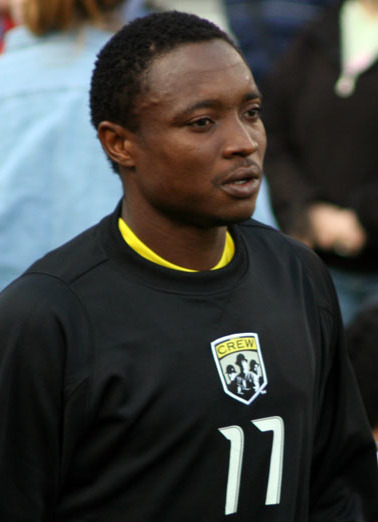

Personal information
- Full name: Emmanuel Ekpo
- Date of birth: 20 December 1987 (age 38)
- Place of birth: Ekori, Nigeria
- Height: 6 ft 1 in (1.85 m)
- Positions: Attacking midfielder; winger

Youth career
- 2005–2006: Calabar Rovers

Senior career*
Years	Team	Apps	(Gls)
2006–2007	Akwa United		
2007–2008	Enyimba International		
2008–2011	Columbus Crew	108	(5)
2012–2014	Molde	40	(0)
2014	Haugesund	1	(0)
2016–2017	Eastern Suburbs AFC	4	(0)

International career
2008	Nigeria Olympic	6	(0)
2011	Nigeria	1	(0)
- * Club domestic league appearances and goals

Emmanuel Ekpo (born 20 December 1987) is a Nigerian former professional footballer who played as an attacking midfielder and winger.

== Career ==
=== Professional ===
Ekpo spent his early years in the youth system of Calabar Rovers, before going on to play professionally for Akwa United and Enyimba in the Nigerian Premier League.

Ekpo signed a contract with Columbus Crew on 15 April 2008, and scored an impressive first goal for the Crew on 28 June 2008, in a game against Colorado Rapids. He went on to be an invaluable part of the Crew team which won the 2008 MLS Cup, the 2008 MLS Supporters Shield, and the 2009 Supporters shield repeat, featuring in over 80 games in all competitions in his first three seasons with the club.

In December 2011 Ekpo became a free agent when he did not re-sign with the Crew. In February 2012 he signed with Molde of Norway, managed by Ole Gunnar Solskjaer, on a three-year contract through 2014.

After two and a half seasons with Molde, Ekpo moved to Haugesund in July 2014, leaving Haugesund after the 2014 season when his contract expired.

In October 2016, Ekpo joined Eastern Suburbs AFC in New Zealand.

=== International ===
Ekpo participated in African Games qualifying in 2007, took part in CAF Olympic qualifying in 2008, and won a silver medal for participating in the Nigerian national team's games during the 2008 Olympic Games in Beijing. He was a second-half substitute in all six of Nigeria's games.

On 6 September 2011, Ekpo received his first cap with the senior team. He played 20 minutes in a 3–1 loss to Argentina in a friendly.

== Career statistics ==
=== Club ===
As of match played 13 November 2016

Appearances and goals by club, season and competition
Club	Season	League			National Cup		Continental		Other		Total	
Club	Season	Division	Apps	Goals	Apps	Goals	Apps	Goals	Apps	Goals	Apps	Goals
Columbus Crew	2008	Major League Soccer	20	2			-		-		20	2
Columbus Crew	2009	Major League Soccer	30	2			6	0	-		36	2
Columbus Crew	2010	Major League Soccer	26	0	3	0	6	1	-		35	1
Columbus Crew	2011	Major League Soccer	32	1	0	0	2	0	-		34	1
Columbus Crew	Total		108	5	3	0	14	1	-	-	125	6
Molde	2012	Tippeligaen	13	0	1	0	2	0	-		16	0
Molde	2013	Tippeligaen	25	0	4	1	4	0	-		33	1
Molde	2014	Tippeligaen	2	0	2	0	0	0	-		4	0
Molde	Total		40	0	7	1	6	0	-	-	53	1
Haugesund	2014	Tippeligaen	1	0	0	0	2	0	–		3	10
Eastern Suburbs	2016–17	New Zealand Football Championship	4	0	–		–		–		4	0
Career total			153	5	10	1	22	1	-	-	185	7

== Honors ==
Columbus Crew

- Major League Soccer MLS Cup: 2008
- Major League Soccer Supporter's Shield: 2008, 2009

Molde

- Tippeligaen: 2012
- Norwegian Football Cup: 2013
