= Chimmanchod =

Chimmanchod Chimmanchoda
- village
- Location in Karnataka, India Chimmanchod (India)
- Coordinates: 17.5252300°N 77.304750°E
- Country: India
- State: Karnataka
- District: Gulbarga
- Taluka: Chincholi

Government
  - Type: Gram
  - Body: Panchayat of Chimmanchod

Area
  - Total: 34 km^{2} (13 sq mi)
  - Rank: 3rd: Chincholi Taluka
- Elevation: 478 m (1,568 ft)

Population (2011)
  - Total: 5,988
  - Rank: 3rd: Chincholi Taluka
  - Density: 174/km^{2} (450/sq mi)

Languages
  - Official: Kannada
- Time zone: UTC+5:30 (IST)
- Pin Code: 585306
- Vehicle registration: KA 32

Chimmanchod also spelled chimmanchoda is a village in the southern state of Karnataka, India It is located in the Chincholi taluk of Kalaburagi district in Karnataka It's Famous For Many Historical Places And Dam

== Demographics ==
As of 2021 India census, Chimmanchod had a population of 9940 with 5450 males and 4490 females.

== See also ==
- Gulbarga
- Districts of Karnataka
