= Kalagi =

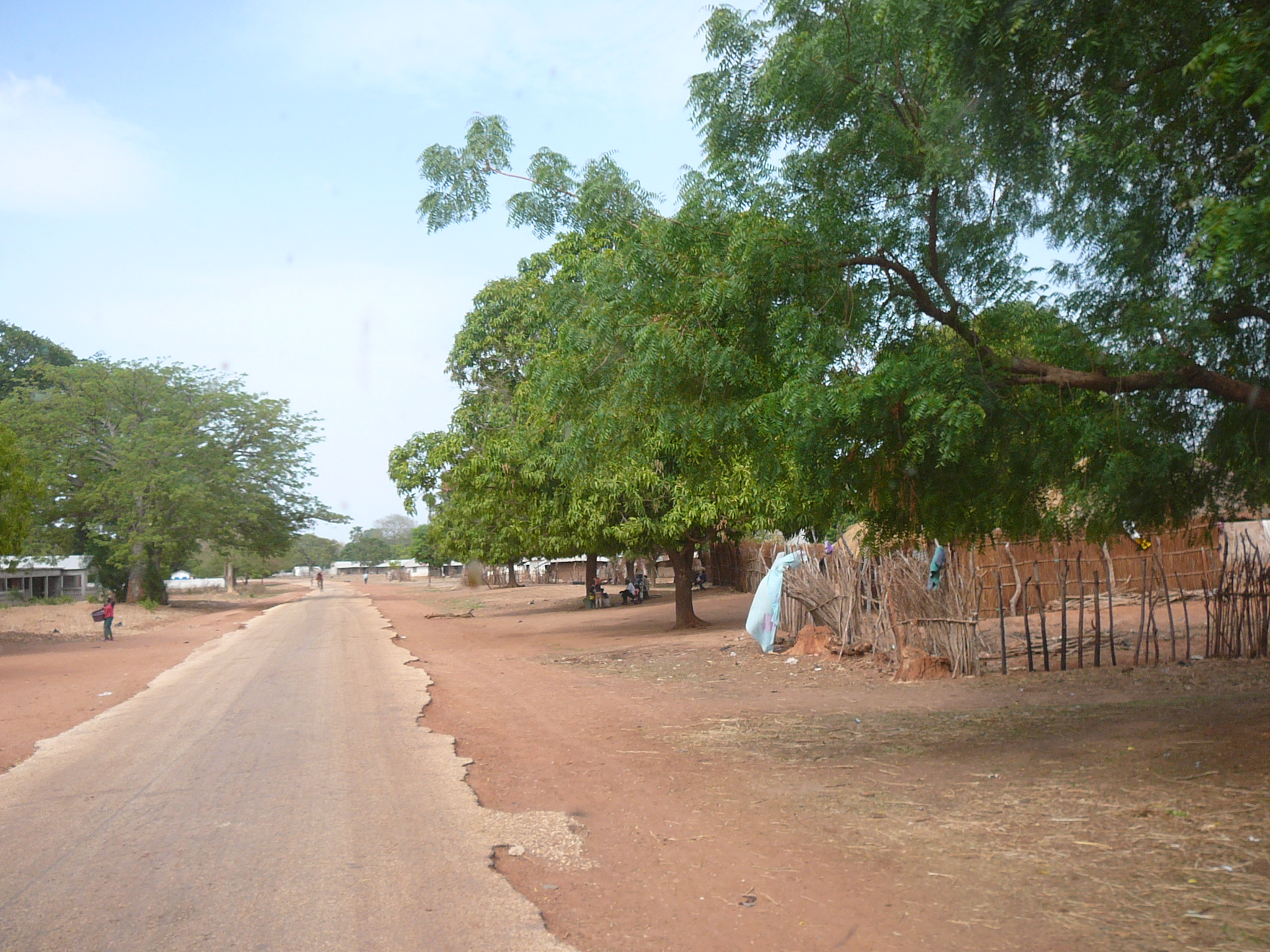

- Location in the Gambia
- Coordinates: 13°15′N 15°50′W
- Country: The Gambia
- Division: Western Division

Population (Est. 2009)
  - Total: 2,825

Kalagi is a town located in the Western Division of the Gambia.

According to a 2013 estimate around 2825 inhabitants live there. The result of the last published census of 2013 2609.
