= Mirko Kramarić =

Croatian footballer

Personal information
- Date of birth: 27 January 1989 (age 37)
- Place of birth: Zagreb, SFR Yugoslavia
- Height: 1.84 m (6 ft 0 in)
- Position: Left-back

Team information
- Current team: Etzella Ettelbruck
- Number: 8

Youth career
- –2008: Dinamo Zagreb

Senior career*
Years	Team	Apps	(Gls)
2008–2010	Lokomotiva	22	(0)
2011–2013	Inter Zaprešić	70	(7)
2014	Istra 1961	11	(0)
2014–2015	Haugesund	4	(0)
2014	→ Haugesund 2	6	(1)
2015	→ Haugesund 2	14	(1)
2015–2016	Željezničar Sarajevo	7	(0)
2017	Radomlje	3	(0)
2018–2019	Brežice	25	(2)
2019–2021	Alisontia Steinsel	32	(4)
2022–	Etzella Ettelbruck	54	(7)

International career
2005	Croatia U17	3	(0)
- * Club domestic league appearances and goals as of 16 June 2024

Mirko Kramarić (Croatian pronunciation: [mǐːrko krǎmaritɕ]; born 27 January 1989) is a Croatian professional footballer who plays as a left-back for Luxembourg National Division club FC Etzella Ettelbruck.

== Career statistics ==
Club performance			League		Cup		League Cup		Continental		Total	
Season	Club	League	Apps	Goals	Apps	Goals	Apps	Goals	Apps	Goals	Apps	Goals
Croatia			League		National Cup		League Cup		Europe		Total	
2008–09	Lokomotiva	Druga HNL	16	0							16	0
2009–10	Lokomotiva	Prva HNL	4	0							4	0
2010–11	Lokomotiva	Prva HNL	3	0							3	0
2010–11	Inter Zaprešić	Prva HNL	10	2							10	2
2011–12	Inter Zaprešić	Prva HNL	20	1							20	1
2012–13	Inter Zaprešić	Prva HNL	27	4							27	4
2013–14	Inter Zaprešić	Druga HNL	13	0	2						15	0
2013–14	Istra 1961	Prva HNL	11	0	2						13	0
2014	Haugesund	Tippeligaen	4	0	1	0	—		—		5	0
2015	Haugesund	Tippeligaen	0	0	1	0	—		—		1	0
2016–17	Željezničar	Premier BIH	7	0	4						11	0
2017	Radomlje	Prva SNL	3	0							3	0
2018–2019	Brežice	Druga SNL	25	2							25	2
2019–2020	Alisontia	Division of Honour	14	1	1	1					15	2
2020-2021	Alisontia	Division of Honour	6	0	1	0					7	0
2021	Alisontia	Division of Honour	9	1	1	1					10	2
2022	Etzella	BGL	9	1	2	0					11	1
Career total			181	12	15	2	0	0	0	0	196	14
