= Kalagi, Mukono =

- Location in Uganda
- Coordinates: 00°30′18″N 32°45′00″E
- Country: Uganda
- District: Mukono District
- Elevation: 3,840 ft (1,170 m)

Kalagi is a town in Mukono District in the Central Region of Uganda.

== Location ==
The town is approximately 10 miles (16 km) north of Mukono, the district headquarters, on an all weather tarmac road. In Kalagi, the road from Mukono forms a T-junction with the road from Kasangati to Kayunga. The coordinates of Kalagi are 0°30'18.0"N, 32°45'00.0"E (Latitude:0.5050; Longitude:32.7500).

== Points of interest ==
The following additional points of interest lie within the town or near its edges:

- offices of Kalagi Town Council
- Kalagi central market
- Ssamba Foundation
