= Chincholi =

Town in the state of Karnataka, India

- Town
- Location in Karnataka, India
- Coordinates: 17.47°N 77.43°E
- Country: India
- State: Karnataka
- District: Kalaburagi

Government
  - Type: Municipality

Area
  - Total: 6 km^{2} (2.3 sq mi)
- Elevation: 462 m (1,516 ft)

Population (2011)
  - Total: 20,897
  - Density: 2,859.67/km^{2} (7,406.5/sq mi)

Languages
  - Official: Kannada
- Time zone: UTC+5:30 (IST)
- PIN: 585 307
- 08475: 08475
- ISO 3166 code: IN-KA
- Vehicle registration: KA 32
- lok sabha: Bidar (Lok Sabha constituency)
- Vidhan Sabha: Chincholi
- Website: www.chincholitown.mrc.gov.in

Chincholi is a panchayat town and a taluka in Kalaburagi district in the state of Karnataka, India.

== Geography ==
Chincholi is located at 17.47°N 77.43°E. It has an average elevation of 462 m (1,516 ft). The town is spread over an area of 6 km^{2} (2.3 sq mi).

== Demographics ==
As of 2011 India census, Chincholi had a population of 20,897 with males numbering 10,852 and females 10,045.

Chincholi Taluka borders the following talukas of Kalaburagi district: Gulbarga Taluka to the west, Chitapur taluka to the south-west and Sedam Taluka to the south. It also borders Chittaguppa Taluk of Bidar district to the north and Tandur Mandal of Vikarabad district of Telangana to the east and Mogudampally mandal of Sangareddy district of Telangana to northeast.

== Politics ==
Chincholi is part of Chincholi Assembly constituency and Bidar (Lok Sabha constituency).

Two time chief minister of Karnataka Veerendra Patil was from this taluka.

Villages in Chincholi Taluk

Sl No	Village Name	Village Code

1	Ainapur	620327
2	Ainoli	620369
3	Allapur	620423
4	Antwaram	620372
5	Anwar	620395
6	Bedagpalli	620444
7	Benkanhalli	620449
8	Benkeppalli	620328
9	Bhairampalli	620401
10	Bhaktampalli	620440
11	Bhantanahalli	620450
12	Bhikkanhalli	620370
13	Bhoglingdhalli	620388
14	Bhonaspur	620374
15	Bhootpur	620462
16	Bhunyar[B]	620324
17	Bhunyar[K]	620325
18	Burugdoddi	620371
19	Burugpalli	620455
20	Chandankera	620343
21	Chandrampalli	620363
22	Channur	620337
23	Chatarsal	620456
24	Chengta	620323
25	Chikkalingadhalli	620397
26	Chimmaidlai	620414
27	Chimmanchod	620347
28	Chincholi (TP)	803208
29	Chincholi [R]	620390
30	Chindnoor	620381
31	Chinkunta	620421
32	Chintpalli	620460
33	Dastapur	620415
34	Daultapur	620393
35	Degalmadi	620367
36	Dharmasagar	620362
37	Dhotikol	620410
38	Dhuttarga	620340
39	Fathepur	620368
40	Gadikeshwar	620448
41	Gadilingdhalli	620338
42	Gandhinagar	620405
43	Ganganpalli	620399
44	Ganjgera	620420
45	Garagpalli	620442
46	Garampalli	620352
47	Ghanpur	620454
48	Gongi	620341
49	Gottamgotta	620357
50	Gottamgotta[K] *	620356
51	Goudanhalli	620392
52	Gurampalli	620334
53	Halcher	620435
54	Halkoda	620468
55	Hanumannagar	620384
56	Hasargundgi	620333
57	Hodebeeranhalli	620437
58	Hosalli	620433
59	Hovinhalli	620466
60	Hudadhalli	620413
61	Hulsgud	620404
62	Huvinbhavi	620419
63	Indarpadhosali	620394
64	Iragpalli	620453
65	Jawaharnagar	620425
66	Jettur	620470
67	Jilwarsha	620380
68	Kalbhavi	620389
69	Kallur Road	620400
70	Kallur [K]	620463
71	Kallur[B]	620464
72	Kanchanhal	620428
73	Karachkhed	620457
74	Karakmukli	620412
75	Katangidda	620359
76	Keroli	620451
77	Khairtapur	620417
78	Khanapur	620326
79	Khudavandpur	620411
80	Kodli	620429
81	Kollur	620364
82	Konchawaram	620378
83	Kordampalli	620452
84	Korvi	620436
85	Kotga	620339
86	Kudhalli	620432
87	Kupnoor	620447
88	Kusrampalli	620354
89	Lachmasagar	620382
90	Linganagar	620373
91	Magdampur	620376
92	Mambapur	620383
93	Manikpur	620355
94	Marpalli	620349
95	Miryan	620402
96	Mogha	620407
97	Moranhal	620418
98	Mukramba	620403
99	Nagaidlai	620365
100	Nagarhal	620335
101	Narnal	620346
102	Nawadgi	620430
103	Neemahosalli	620391
104	Nidugunda	620458
105	Nirchalma	620387
106	Pangarga	620342
107	Pardarmotakpalli	620439
108	Pastpur	620408
109	Patpalli	620366
110	Penchganpalli	620446
111	Pochawaram	620379
112	Polakpalli	620396
113	Potangal	620469
114	Raikod	620461
115	Ramteerth	620443
116	Ranapur	620344
117	Ratkal	620427
118	Rudnoor	620465
119	Rummungud	620406
120	Rustumpur	620409
121	Salebeernhalli	620331
122	Salgar Basanthpur	620329
123	Sangam[K]	620441
124	Sangapur	620358
125	Sasargaon	620345
126	Seri	620424
127	Shadipur	620385
128	Shikarm0Takpalli	620350
129	Shivrampur	620375
130	Shivredpalli	620377
131	Siroli	620467
132	Somlingadhalli	620398
133	Srinagar	620360
134	Sulepeth	620438
135	Sunthan	620426
136	Tadpalli	620422
137	Tajlapur	620348
138	Tegaltippi	620434
139	Tirmalapur	620353
140	Tumkunta	620332
141	Venkatapur	620459
142	Venkatapur	620361
143	Wazirgaon	620431
144	Yakapur	620445
145	Yakatpur	620386
146	Yalmamdi	620336
147	Yelakpalli	620416
148	Yempalli	620351
149	Yetabarpur	620330

== Tourist places ==
- Sukshetra Buggi
- Chandrapalli reservoir
- Etti Potta Falls
- Nagaral reservoir and Gottamgotta
- Chincholi Wildlife Sanctuary

== Transport ==
KSRTC provides bus travels within Karnataka and the nearby states of Maharastra and Telangana. The nearest railway stations are Sedam railway station (42 km (26 mi)) and Tandur railway station (30 km (19 mi)). The nearest international airport is Rajiv Gandhi International Airport (146 km (91 mi)), whilst the nearest domestic airport is Gulbarga Airport (80 km (50 mi)). Another nearby domestic airport is Bidar Airport (60 km (37 mi))
