= 2015 IK Start season =

Start
2015 season
- Chairman: Magne Kristiansen
- Manager: Mons Ivar Mjelde (until 4 September); Bård Borgersen (from 4 September)
- Stadium: Sør Arena
- Tippeligaen: 14th
- Norwegian Cup: Second Round vs Vindbjart
- Top goalscorer: League: Kristoffer Ajer (8); All: Kristoffer Ajer (12)
Home colours	Away colours

The 2015 season is Start's 3rd season in the Tippeligaen since their promotion back to the league in 2012, and their fifth season with Mons Ivar Mjelde as manager. Start competed in the Tippeligaen and the Norwegian Cup.

== Squad ==
Note: Flags indicate national team as defined under FIFA eligibility rules; some limited exceptions apply. Players may hold more than one non-FIFA nationality.

No.	Pos.	Nation	Player
1	GK	NOR	Håkon Opdal (captain)
2	DF	NOR	Jon Hodnemyr
3	DF	NOR	Ole Martin Rindarøy (on loan from Molde)
4	MF	USA	Alex DeJohn
5	DF	NOR	Robert Sandnes
6	MF	NOR	Kristoffer Ajer
8	FW	NOR	Espen Hoff
9	MF	NOR	Daniel Aase (on loan from Vindbjart)
14	MF	NOR	Espen Børufsen
15	DF	DEN	Michael Christensen
16	MF	NOR	Andreas Hollingen (on loan from Molde)
17	MF	ISL	Guðmundur Kristjánsson
18	FW	NOR	Mads Stokkelien
19	FW	NGR	Austin Ikenna

No.	Pos.	Nation	Player
21	MF	NOR	Henrik Breimyr
22	FW	NOR	Lars-Jørgen Salvesen
23	MF	NOR	Erlend Segberg
25	GK	IRL	Sean McDermott
26	DF	NOR	Jesper Mathisen
27	MF	NOR	Eirik Wichne
28	DF	NOR	Rolf Daniel Vikstøl
30	FW	NOR	Lasse Sigurdsen
31	GK	SWE	Samuel Dirscher
32	MF	NOR	Matias Rasmussen
33	DF	NOR	Jørgen Hammer
36	FW	NOR	Markus Jørgensen Håbestad
—	MF	NOR	Tobias Christensen

=== Players out on loan ===
Note: Flags indicate national team as defined under FIFA eligibility rules; some limited exceptions apply. Players may hold more than one non-FIFA nationality.

No.	Pos.	Nation	Player
11	FW	CRC	Alejandro Castro (at Brann)
20	DF	NOR	John Olav Norheim (at Nest-Sotra)

No.	Pos.	Nation	Player
25	GK	ISL	Ingvar Jónsson (at Sandnes Ulf)

== Transfers ==
=== Winter ===
In: Note: Flags indicate national team as defined under FIFA eligibility rules; some limited exceptions apply. Players may hold more than one non-FIFA nationality.

No.	Pos.	Nation	Player
3	DF	NOR	Ole Martin Rindarøy (loan from (Norway) Molde)
4	DF	USA	Alex DeJohn (from (Finland) TPS)
9	MF	NOR	Emil Dahle (loan from (Norway) Stabæk)
15	DF	DEN	Michael Christensen (from (Denmark) Vestsjælland)
16	MF	NOR	Andreas Hollingen (loan from (Norway) Molde)
23	MF	NOR	Erlend Segberg (from (Norway) Vigør)
25	GK	ISL	Ingvar Jónsson (from (Iceland) Stjarnan)
27	MF	NOR	Eirik Wichne (from (Norway) Mandalskameratene)
30	FW	NOR	Lasse Sigurdsen (from (Norway) Flekkerøy)

Out: Note: Flags indicate national team as defined under FIFA eligibility rules; some limited exceptions apply. Players may hold more than one non-FIFA nationality.

No.	Pos.	Nation	Player
2	DF	NOR	Glenn Andersen (to (Norway) Jerv)
4	DF	NGR	Seyi Olofinjana
9	FW	GHA	Ernest Asante (to (Norway) Stabæk)
11	FW	CRC	Alejandro Castro (loan to (Norway) Brann, previously at Sarpsborg 08)
13	MF	NOR	Zlatko Tripić (to (Germany) Greuther Fürth)
15	DF	CRC	Bismark Acosta (to (Norway) Brann)
16	FW	NOR	Alexander Lind (to (Norway) Jerv)
24	GK	NOR	Pål Vestly Heigre (loan return to (Norway) Viking)
30	GK	NOR	Terje Reinertsen (retired)
33	DF	NOR	Amin Nouri (to (Norway) Brann)
99	MF	CRC	Fernando Paniagua

=== Summer ===
In: Note: Flags indicate national team as defined under FIFA eligibility rules; some limited exceptions apply. Players may hold more than one non-FIFA nationality.

No.	Pos.	Nation	Player
9	MF	NOR	Daniel Aase (loan from (Norway) Vindbjart)
18	FW	NOR	Mads Stokkelien (free agent)
19	FW	NGR	Austin Ikenna (from (Kenya) Leopards)
21	MF	NOR	Henrik Breimyr (from (Norway) Bryne)
25	GK	IRL	Sean McDermott (from (Norway) Sandnes Ulf)
33	DF	NOR	Jørgen Hammer (from (Norway) Stabæk)
—	MF	NOR	Tobias Christensen (from (Norway) Vigør)

Out: Note: Flags indicate national team as defined under FIFA eligibility rules; some limited exceptions apply. Players may hold more than one non-FIFA nationality.

No.	Pos.	Nation	Player
9	MF	NOR	Emil Dahle (loan return to (Norway) Stabæk)
10	MF	NGR	Solomon Owello (to (Norway) Sandnes Ulf)
18	FW	ISL	Matthías Vilhjálmsson (to (Norway) Rosenborg)
20	DF	NOR	John Olav Norheim (on loan to (Norway) Nest-Sotra)
25	GK	ISL	Ingvar Jónsson (on loan to (Norway) Sandnes Ulf)

== Competitions ==
=== Tippeligaen ===
==== Results summary ====
Overall								Home						Away					
Pld	W	D	L	GF	GA	GD	Pts	W	D	L	GF	GA	GD	W	D	L	GF	GA	GD
30	6	7	17	35	64	−29	25	4	3	8	18	29	−11	2	4	9	17	35	−18

==== Results by round ====
Round	1	2	3	4	5	6	7	8	9	10	11	12	13	14	15	16	17	18	19	20	21	22	23	24	25	26	27	28	29	30
Ground	A	H	A	H	A	H	A	H	A	H	A	H	A	H	H	A	H	A	A	H	A	H	A	H	A	H	A	H	A	H
Result	D	W	D	L	L	W	L	D	L	L	W	L	D	W	W	L	L	L	L	L	L	L	L	D	D	L	L	D	L	L
Position	8	4	6	8	11	8	11	12	12	13	10	12	12	10	9	9	10	12	13	13	13	13	15	13	13	13	14	14	14	14

Updated to match(es) played on 9 November 2015. Source: see below
A = Away; H = Home; W = Win; D = Draw; L = Loss

==== Results ====
7 April 2015 1	Lillestrøm	1–1	Start	Lillestrøm
19:00 CEST (UTC+2)	Kippe (red card) 47'; Fofana (yellow card) 58'; Mikalsen 90+4'	Summary	Børufsen 11' (yellow card) 90+5'; Dahle (yellow card) 55'; Sandnes (yellow card) 63'	Stadium: Åråsen Stadion; Attendance: 4,961; Referee: Dag Vidar Hafsås

12 April 2015 2	Start	2–1	Sandefjord	Kristiansand
18:00 CEST (UTC+2)	Kristjánsson (yellow card) 76'; Børufsen (yellow card) 81'; Hoff 83', 90+3'	Summary	Gabrielsen 67'; Herlofsen (yellow card) 87'; Larsen (yellow card) 90+6'	Stadium: Sør Arena; Attendance: 5,234; Referee: Martin Lundby

18 April 2015 3	Mjøndalen	1–1	Start	Mjøndalen
15:30 CEST (UTC+2)	Midtgarden (penalty missed); Gundersen 48'	Summary	Christensen (yellow card) 36'; Vilhjálmsson 88'	Stadium: Isachsen Stadion; Attendance: 2,468; Referee: Ola Hobber Nilsen

24 April 2015 4	Start	2–3	Vålerenga	Kristiansand
19:00 CEST (UTC+2)	Børufsen 43'; Vilhjálmsson 53'	Summary	Zahid 4'; Brown 55'; Stengel 84'	Stadium: Sør Arena; Attendance: 7,349; Referee: Dag Vidar Hafsås

30 April 2015 5	Rosenborg	3–2	Start	Trondheim
20:00 CEST (UTC+2)	Dorsin (yellow card) 35'; Søderlund 57', 74'; Henderson 86'	Summary	Børufsen 4'; Vikstøl (yellow card) 23'; Kristjánsson (yellow card) 24'; Sandnes (yellow card) 48' (yellow-red card) 62'; Ajer 90+3'	Stadium: Lerkendal Stadion; Attendance: 14 134; Referee: Svein-Erik Edvartsen

3 May 2015 6	Start	3–1	Tromsø	Kristiansand
15:30 CEST (UTC+2)	Hollingen 4'; Vilhjálmsson 18'; Ajer 89'; Kristjánsson (yellow card) 90'	Summary	Ondrášek 31'; Antonsen (yellow card) 50'	Stadium: Sør Arena; Attendance: 5,123; Referee: Trond Ivar Døvle

10 May 2015 7	Molde	4–0	Start	Molde
20:00 CEST (UTC+2)	Høiland 22', 31', 87'; Agnaldo 71'	Summary	DeJohn (yellow card) 27'; Hollingen (yellow card) 72'	Stadium: Aker Stadion; Attendance: 8,269; Referee: Ken Henry Johnsen

13 May 2015 8	Start	1–1	Bodø/Glimt	Kristiansand
18:00 CEST (UTC+2)	Vikstøl 8'; Salvesen (yellow card) 67'	Summary	Cruz 6'; Brix (yellow card) 19'; Sané (yellow card) 69'	Stadium: Sør Arena; Attendance: 4,900; Referee: Svein-Erik Edvartsen

16 May 2015 9	Viking	1–0	Start	Stavanger
20:00 CEST (UTC+2)	Mets (yellow card) 54'; Bytyqi 88'	Summary	Christensen (yellow card) 16'	Stadium: Viking Stadion; Attendance: 14,128; Referee: Tommy Skjerven

25 May 2015 10	Start	1–2	Sarpsborg 08	Kristiansand
20:00 CEST (UTC+2)	Børufsen (yellow card) 30'; Hoff (red card) 40'; Vilhjálmsson 69'	Summary	Nordvik (yellow card) 27'; Kronberg (yellow card) 53'; Kerr (yellow card) 60'; Tokstad 65'; Wiig 86'	Stadium: Sør Arena; Attendance: 4,683; Referee: Trygve Kjensli

30 May 2015 11	Haugesund	0–2	Start	Haugesund
15:30 CEST (UTC+2)	Diedhiou (yellow card) 88'	Summary	Ajer 50', 85'; Dahle (yellow card) 59'	Stadium: Haugesund Stadion; Attendance: 5,109; Referee: Espen Berntsen

7 June 2015 12	Start	0–1	Strømsgodset	Kristiansand
18:00 CEST (UTC+2)	Christensen (yellow card) 63'	Summary	Vilsvik (yellow card) 61'; Fossum 70'	Stadium: Sør Arena; Attendance: 9,239; Referee: Tommy Skjerven

19 June 2015 13	Odd	3–3	Start	Skien
19:00 CEST (UTC+2)	Occéan 33' (pen.); Eriksen 35'; Samuelsen 42'; Hagen (yellow card) 89'; Ruud (yellow card) 90'	Summary	Børufsen 39'; Ajer (yellow card) 40'; Hoff (yellow card) 53'; Vilhjálmsson 73'; Hollingen (yellow card) 76'; Salvesen 89' (pen.)	Stadium: Skagerak Arena; Attendance: 7,318; Referee: Trygve Kjensli

27 June 2015 14	Start	3–1	Aalesund	(town)
15:30 CEST (UTC+2)	Vilhjálmsson 2'; Christensen (yellow card) 14'; Børufsen 21'; Vikstøl (yellow card) 29'; Kristjánsson (yellow card) 83'; Ajer 85' (pen.)	Summary	Dyrestam (yellow card) 19'; Þrándarson 22' (yellow card) 69'; Abdellaoue (yellow card) 90+3'	Stadium: Sør Arena; Attendance: 6,002; Referee: Ole Gya

4 July 2015 15	Start	4–1	Stabæk	Kristiansand
15:30 CEST (UTC+2)	Vilhjálmsson 20'; Hoff 45+1'; Ajer 53', 69'; Sandnes (yellow card) 87'	Summary	Diomande 68'	Stadium: Sør Arena; Attendance: 5,221; Referee: Anders Johansen

12 July 2015 16	Tromsø	2–1	Start	Tromsø
18:00 CEST (UTC+2)	Andersen 23'; Sandnes 63' (o.g.)	Summary	Ajer 19'	Stadium: Alfheim Stadion; Attendance: 3,526; Referee: Trond Ivar Døvle

24 July 2015 17	Start	0–3	Viking	Kristiansand
19:00 CEST (UTC+2)		Summary	Nisja 4'; Danielsen 36' (pen.); Böðvarsson 38'; Mets (yellow card) 57'	Stadium: Sør Arena; Attendance: 8,871; Referee: Dag Vidar Hafsås

2 August 2015 18	Aalesund	2–0	Start	Ålesund
18:00 CEST (UTC+2)	Þrándarson 53'; Matland 64'	Summary	Børufsen (yellow card) 18'; Christensen (yellow card) 63'	Stadium: Color Line Stadion; Attendance: 6,939; Referee: Svein Oddvar Moen

9 August 2015 19	Bodø/Glimt	5–1	Start	Bodø
18:00 CEST (UTC+2)	Sørloth 12', 66', 76', 90+2' (pen.); Olsen 45+1'; Sané (yellow card) 72'	Summary	Salvesen 10'; Børufsen (yellow card) 45+1'; Kristjánsson (yellow card) 90+2'	Stadium: Aspmyra stadion Attendance: 3,674; Referee: Kai Erik Steen

16 August 2015 20	Start	0–4	Odd	Kristiansand
15:30 CEST (UTC+2)	Christensen (yellow card) 61'	Summary	Zekhnini 2'; Bentley 12'; Occéan 34' (pen.); Storbæk (yellow card) 80'; Halvorsen 85'	Stadium: Sør Arena; Attendance: 5,207; Referee: Martin Lundby

23 August 2015 21	Strømsgodset	2–1	Start	Drammen
18:00 CEST (UTC+2)	Hammer 43' (o.g.); Pedersen 64' (pen.)	Summary	Vikstøl 7'; Aase (yellow card) 29'; Christensen (yellow card) 81'; Stokkelien (yellow card) 90+1'	Stadium: Marienlyst Stadion; Attendance: 6,433; Referee: Svein Oddvar Moen

30 August 2015 22	Start	1–3	Haugesund	Kristiansand
18:00 CEST (UTC+2)	Hammer (yellow card) 72'; Kristjánsson 89'; Vikstøl (yellow card) 90+1'	Summary	Haraldseid 9'; Diedhiou 64'; Gytkjær 80'	Stadium: Sør Arena; Attendance: 4,989; Referee: Trygve Kjensli

13 September 2015 23	Sarpsborg 08	3–1	Start	Sarpsborg
18:00 CEST (UTC+2)	Mortensen 3'; Tokstad 16'; Groven (yellow card) 45'; Wiig 68'	Summary	Børufsen 78'	Stadium: Sarpsborg Stadion; Attendance: 3,485; Referee: Andres Johansen

19 September 2015 24	Start	0–0	Lillestrøm	Kristiansand
15:30 CEST (UTC+2)		Summary	Margeirsson (yellow card) 80'	Stadium: Sør Arena; Attendance: 5,354; Referee: Tom Harald Hagen

25 September 2015 25	Vålerenga	1–1	Start	Oslo
19:00 CEST (UTC+2)	Holm 18'; Wæhler (yellow card) 65'	Summary	Breimyr (yellow card) 36'; Vikstøl (yellow card) 50'; Opdal 66'	Stadium: Ullevaal stadion Attendance: 8,308; Referee: Svein Oddvar Moen

4 October 2015 26	Start	0–4	Rosenborg	(town)
20:00 CEST (UTC+2)	Salvesen (yellow card) 86'	Summary	Konradsen 6'; Helland 25' (pen.); Midtsjø 45'; Skjelvik 47'	Stadium: Sør Arena; Attendance: 5,386; Referee: Trond Ivar Døvle

17 October 2015 27	Sandefjord	4–1	Start	Sandefjord
15:30 CEST (UTC+2)	Sellin 2'; Dieng 27', 88'; Morer (yellow card) 60'; Juel-Nielsen (yellow card) 86'; Mendy 90+4'	Summary	Bindia 63' (o.g.); Vikstøl (yellow card) 65'; Christensen (yellow card) 87'	Stadium: Komplett.no Arena; Attendance: 3,435; Referee: Svein-Erik Edvartsen

23 October 2015 28	Start	1–1	Mjøndalen	Kristiansand
19:00 CEST (UTC+2)	Aase 60'; Kristjánsson (yellow card) 63'	Summary	Sundli 20'	Stadium: Sør Arena; Attendance: 8,854; Referee: Svein Oddvar Moen

1 November 2015 29	Stabæk	3–2	Start	Bærum
18:00 CET (UTC+1)	Kassi 31'; Issah 53'; Jalasto 82'	Summary	Stokkelien 45'; Vikstøl 48'; Ajer (yellow card) 88'; Hoff (yellow card) 90+4'	Stadium: Nadderud Stadion; Attendance: 4,567; Referee: Anders Johansen

8 November 2015 30	Start	0–3	Molde	Kristiansand
18:00 CET (UTC+1)	Børufsen (yellow card) 38'	Summary	Svendsen 22'; Gabrielsen 42'; Flo 72'	Stadium: Sør Arena; Attendance: 5,914; Referee: Dag Vidar Hafsås

==== Table ====
Pos	Team	Pld	W	D	L	GF	GA	GD	Pts	Qualification or relegation
12	Haugesund	30	8	7	15	33	52	−19	31	
13	Tromsø	30	7	8	15	36	50	−14	29	
14	Start (O)	30	5	7	18	35	64	−29	22	Qualification for the relegation play-offs
15	Mjøndalen (R)	30	4	9	17	38	69	−31	21	Relegation to First Division
16	Sandefjord (R)	30	4	4	22	36	68	−32	16	Relegation to First Division

Source: Football Association of Norway (in Norwegian), Soccerway
Rules for classification: 1) Points; 2) Goal difference; 3) Goals scored; 4) Head-to-head points; 5) Head-to-head goal difference; 6) Head-to-head away goals scored (between two teams).
(O) Play-off winners; (R) Relegated

==== Relegation play-offs ====
21 November 2015 First leg	Jerv	1–1	Start	Grimstad
12:00 CET (UTC+1)	Omoijuanfo 87'	Summary	Stokkelien 20' (yellow card) 43'; Ikenna (yellow card) 67'	Stadium: Levermyr Stadion; Referee: Trygve Kjensli

25 November 2015 Second leg	Start	3–1 (4–2 agg.)	Jerv	Kristiansand
19:00 CET (UTC+1)	DeJohn (yellow card) 16' (goal) 82'; Hollingen 42'; Børufsen 49'	Summary	Antwi (yellow card) 26' (goal) 45'	Stadium: Sør Arena; Attendance: 12,245; Referee: Tom Harald Hagen

=== Norwegian Cup ===
21 April 2015 First Round	Vigør	0–5	Start	Kristiansand
18:00 CEST (UTC+2)	Utgård (yellow card) 10'; Kydland (yellow card) 19'	Summary	Ajer 43', 45+1', 52', 57' (yellow card) 62'; Hoff 73'	Stadium: Hellemyr kunstgress Attendance: 876; Referee: Espen Larsen

6 May 2015 Second Round	Vindbjart	4–0	Start	Vennesla
18:00 CEST (UTC+2)	Gausdal 48' (pen.), 63'; Follerås 52'; Skeie (yellow card) 71'; Aase (yellow card) 80'; Zernichow 82'	Summary	Sandnes (yellow card) 51'; Kristjánsson (yellow card) 79'	Stadium: Moseidmoen; Attendance: 2,300; Referee: Rohit Saggi

== Squad statistics ==
As of match played 25 November 2015

=== Appearances and goals ===
No.	Pos	Nat	Player	Total		Tippeligaen		Norwegian Cup		Play-off	
No.	Pos	Nat	Player	Apps	Goals	Apps	Goals	Apps	Goals	Apps	Goals
1	GK	(Norway) NOR	Håkon Opdal	31	1	29	1	0	0	2	0
2	DF	(Norway) NOR	Jon Hodnemyr	15	0	7+5	0	2	0	0+1	0
3	DF	(Norway) NOR	Ole Martin Rindarøy	20	0	15+1	0	2	0	2	0
4	DF	(United States) USA	Alex DeJohn	25	1	17+5	0	1	0	2	1
5	DF	(Norway) NOR	Robert Sandnes	22	0	10+9	0	2	0	0+1	0
6	MF	(Norway) NOR	Kristoffer Ajer	34	12	29+1	8	1+1	4	2	0
8	FW	(Norway) NOR	Espen Hoff	30	4	21+5	3	2	1	1+1	0
9	MF	(Norway) NOR	Daniel Aase	10	1	4+5	1	0	0	1	0
14	MF	(Norway) NOR	Espen Børufsen	27	7	25	6	0	0	2	1
15	DF	(Denmark) DEN	Michael Christensen	30	0	27	0	1	0	2	0
16	MF	(Norway) NOR	Andreas Hollingen	22	2	15+4	1	0+1	0	2	1
17	MF	(Iceland) ISL	Guðmundur Kristjánsson	28	1	24	1	2	0	1+1	0
18	FW	(Norway) NOR	Mads Stokkelien	12	2	9+1	1	0	0	2	1
19	FW	(Nigeria) NGR	Austin Ikenna	6	0	0+5	0	0	0	0+1	0
21	MF	(Norway) NOR	Henrik Breimyr	14	0	12	0	0	0	2	0
22	FW	(Norway) NOR	Lars-Jørgen Salvesen	24	2	7+15	2	1+1	0	0	0
23	MF	(Norway) NOR	Erlend Segberg	10	0	1+9	0	0	0	0	0
28	DF	(Norway) NOR	Rolf Daniel Vikstøl	28	3	26	3	0+1	0	1	0
32	MF	(Norway) NOR	Matias Rasmussen	12	0	4+7	0	0	0	0+1	0
33	DF	(Norway) NOR	Jørgen Hammer	10	0	10	0	0	0	0	0
36	FW	(Norway) NOR	Markus Jørgensen Håbestad	1	0	0+1	0	0	0	0	0
Players away from the club on loan:
20	MF	(Norway) NOR	John Olav Norheim	6	0	0+4	0	2	0	0	0
25	GK	(Iceland) ISL	Ingvar Jónsson	3	0	1	0	2	0	0	0
Players who played for Start that left during the season:
9	MF	(Norway) NOR	Emil Dahle	13	0	9+2	0	1+1	0	0	0
10	MF	(Nigeria) NGR	Solomon Owello	19	0	14+3	0	2	0	0	0
18	FW	(Iceland) ISL	Matthías Vilhjálmsson	15	7	14	7	1	0	0	0

=== Goal scorers ===
Place	Position	Nation	Number	Name	Tippeligaen	Norwegian Cup	Play-offs	Total
1	MF	(Norway)	6	Kristoffer Ajer	8	4	0	12
2	FW	(Iceland)	18	Matthías Vilhjálmsson	7	0	0	7
2	MF	(Norway)	14	Espen Børufsen	6	0	1	7
4	FW	(Norway)	8	Espen Hoff	3	1	0	4
5	DF	(Norway)	28	Rolf Daniel Vikstøl	3	0	0	3
6	FW	(Norway)	22	Lars-Jørgen Salvesen	2	0	0	2
6	FW	(Norway)	18	Mads Stokkelien	1	0	1	2
6	MF	(Norway)	16	Andreas Hollingen	1	0	1	2
8	MF	(Iceland)	17	Guðmundur Kristjánsson	1	0	0	1
8	GK	(Norway)	1	Håkon Opdal	1	0	0	1
8	MF	(Norway)	9	Daniel Aase	1	0	0	1
8	DF	(United States)	4	Alex DeJohn	0	0	1	1
				TOTALS	34	5	4	43

=== Disciplinary record ===
Number	Nation	Position	Name	Tippeligaen		Norwegian Cup		Play-off		Total	
Number	Nation	Position	Name	Yellow card	Red card	Yellow card	Red card	Yellow card	Red card	Yellow card	Red card
4	(United States)	DF	Alex DeJohn	1	0	0	0	1	0	2	0
5	(Norway)	DF	Robert Sandnes	4	1	1	0	0	0	5	1
6	(Norway)	MF	Kristoffer Ajer	2	0	1	0	0	0	3	0
8	(Norway)	FW	Espen Hoff	2	1	0	0	0	0	2	1
9	(Norway)	MF	Emil Dahle	2	0	0	0	0	0	2	0
9	(Norway)	MF	Daniel Aase	1	0	0	0	0	0	1	0
14	(Norway)	MF	Espen Børufsen	6	0	0	0	0	0	6	0
15	(Denmark)	DF	Michael Christensen	8	0	0	0	0	0	8	0
16	(Norway)	MF	Andreas Hollingen	2	0	0	0	0	0	2	0
17	(Iceland)	MF	Guðmundur Kristjánsson	6	0	1	0	0	0	7	0
18	(Norway)	FW	Mads Stokkelien	1	0	0	0	1	0	2	0
19	(Nigeria)	FW	Austin Ikenna	0	0	0	0	1	0	1	0
21	(Norway)	MF	Henrik Breimyr	1	0	0	0	0	0	1	0
22	(Norway)	FW	Lars-Jørgen Salvesen	2	0	0	0	0	0	2	0
28	(Norway)	DF	Rolf Daniel Vikstøl	5	0	0	0	0	0	5	0
33	(Norway)	DF	Jørgen Hammer	1	0	0	0	0	0	1	0
			TOTALS	44	2	3	0	3	0	50	2
