= 2016 IK Start season =

Start
2016 season
- Chairman: Magne Kristiansen
- Manager: Steinar Pedersen
- Stadium: Sør Arena
- Tippeligaen: 16th
- Norwegian Cup: Third Round vs Sandnes Ulf
- Top goalscorer: League: Lars-Jørgen Salvesen (4); All: Lars-Jørgen Salvesen (6)
Home colours	Away colours

The 2016 season is Start's 4th season in the Tippeligaen since their promotion back to the league in 2012, and their first season with Steinar Pedersen as manager. Start competed in the Tippeligaen and the Norwegian Cup.

== Squad ==
As of 14 August 2016

Note: Flags indicate national team as defined under FIFA eligibility rules; some limited exceptions apply. Players may hold more than one non-FIFA nationality.

No.	Pos.	Nation	Player
1	GK	NOR	Håkon Opdal
2	DF	NOR	Jens Kristian Skogmo
3	DF	FIN	Tapio Heikkilä
4	DF	USA	Alex DeJohn
5	DF	NOR	Robert Sandnes
6	MF	NOR	Kristoffer Ajer
7	MF	NGR	Chidiebere Nwakali (on loan from Manchester City)
8	FW	NOR	Espen Hoff
9	MF	NOR	Daniel Aase
10	MF	LBR	Dulee Johnson
11	FW	NGR	Uduak Cyril Idemokon (on loan from Bujoc)
14	MF	NOR	Espen Børufsen
15	DF	NOR	Henrik Robstad
16	MF	NOR	Andreas Hollingen

No.	Pos.	Nation	Player
17	MF	ISL	Guðmundur Kristjánsson
18	MF	NOR	Jibril Bojang
19	FW	NGR	Austin Ikenna
20	DF	NOR	John Olav Norheim
22	FW	NOR	Lars-Jørgen Salvesen
23	MF	NOR	Erlend Segberg
26	DF	NOR	Jesper Mathisen
27	MF	NOR	Eirik Wichne
28	DF	NOR	Rolf Daniel Vikstøl (captain)
29	FW	BIH	Adi Markovic
30	FW	NOR	Lasse Sigurdsen
33	FW	GHA	Denny Antwi
—	MF	NOR	Thomas Zernichow
—	FW	NOR	Markus Håbestad

== Transfers ==
=== Winter ===
In: Note: Flags indicate national team as defined under FIFA eligibility rules; some limited exceptions apply. Players may hold more than one non-FIFA nationality.

No.	Pos.	Nation	Player
2	DF	NOR	Jens Kristian Skogmo (from (Norway) Follo)
3	DF	FIN	Tapio Heikkilä (from (Finland) SJK Seinäjoki)
7	MF	NGR	Chidiebere Nwakali (on loan from (England) Manchester City)
9	MF	NOR	Daniel Aase (from (Norway) Vindbjart, previously on loan)
11	FW	NGR	Uduak Cyril Idemokon (on loan from (Nigeria) Bujoc)
15	DF	NOR	Henrik Robstad (from (Norway) Jerv)
16	MF	NOR	Andreas Hollingen (from (Norway) Molde, previously on loan)
—	MF	NOR	Henrik Byklum (from (Norway) Randesund)

Out: Note: Flags indicate national team as defined under FIFA eligibility rules; some limited exceptions apply. Players may hold more than one non-FIFA nationality.

No.	Pos.	Nation	Player
2	DF	NOR	Jon Hodnemyr (to (Norway) Vindbjart)
3	DF	NOR	Ole Martin Rindarøy (loan return to (Norway) Molde)
6	MF	NOR	Kristoffer Ajer (to (Scotland) Celtic)
11	FW	CRC	Alejandro Castro (released, previously on loan at (Norway) Brann)
15	DF	DEN	Michael Christensen (to (Denmark) Hobro)
18	FW	NOR	Mads Stokkelien (released)
20	DF	NOR	John Olav Norheim (on loan to (Norway) KFUM Oslo, previously on loan at (Norway) Nest-Sotra)
31	MF	NOR	Joachim Eriksen (to (Norway) Fløy)
33	DF	NOR	Jørgen Hammer (to (Norway) KFUM Oslo)
—	MF	NOR	Henrik Byklum (on loan to (Norway) Fløy)
—	GK	ISL	Ingvar Jónsson (to (Norway) Sandefjord, previously on loan at (Norway) Sandnes Ulf)

=== Summer ===
In: Note: Flags indicate national team as defined under FIFA eligibility rules; some limited exceptions apply. Players may hold more than one non-FIFA nationality.

No.	Pos.	Nation	Player
10	MF	LBR	Dulee Johnson (from (Norway) Molde)
18	MF	NOR	Jibril Bojang (from (Norway) Lørenskog)
33	FW	GHA	Denny Antwi (from (Norway) Jerv)
—	MF	NOR	Thomas Zernichow (from (Norway) Vindbjart)

Out: Note: Flags indicate national team as defined under FIFA eligibility rules; some limited exceptions apply. Players may hold more than one non-FIFA nationality.

No.	Pos.	Nation	Player
21	MF	NOR	Henrik Breimyr (to (Norway) Sandnes Ulf)
25	GK	IRL	Sean McDermott (to (Norway) Ull/Kisa)
32	MF	NOR	Mathias Rasmussen (to (Denmark) Nordsjælland)

== Competitions ==
=== Tippeligaen ===
==== Results summary ====
Overall								Home						Away					
Pld	W	D	L	GF	GA	GD	Pts	W	D	L	GF	GA	GD	W	D	L	GF	GA	GD
30	2	10	18	23	59	−36	16	2	4	9	15	34	−19	0	6	9	8	25	−17

Last updated: 8 November 2016.
Source: see below

==== Results by round ====
Round	1	2	3	4	5	6	7	8	9	10	11	12	13	14	15	16	17	18	19	20	21	22	23	24	25	26	27	28	29	30
Ground	H	A	H	H	A	H	A	H	A	H	A	A	H	A	H	A	H	A	H	A	H	A	H	A	H	A	H	A	H	A
Result	D	D	L	D	L	L	L	D	L	L	D	D	L	L	L	D	L	L	L	D	D	L	L	L	W	L	W	D	L	L
Position	10	11	12	12	14	16	16	16	16	16	16	16	16	16	16	16	16	16	16	16	16	16	16	16	16	16	16	16	16	16

Updated to match(es) played on 8 November 2016. Source: See Results
A = Away; H = Home; W = Win; D = Draw; L = Loss

==== Results ====
13 March 2016 1	Start	1–1	Lillestrøm	Kristiansand
20:00 CET (UTC+1)	Heikkilä 37'; Hollingen (yellow card) 84'	Summary	Kolstad (yellow card) 26'; Martin 42'; Jradi (yellow card) 69'	Stadium: Sør Arena; Attendance: 3,623; Referee: Svein-Erik Edvartsen

18 March 2016 2	Tromsø	0–0	Start	Tromsø
18:00 CET (UTC+1)	Landu Landu (yellow card) 38'; Wangberg (yellow card) 63'	Summary	Ajer (yellow card) 68'	Stadium: Alfheim Stadion; Attendance: 4,241; Referee: Trygve Kjensli

2 April 2016 3	Start	0–1	Viking	Kristiansand
15:30 CEST (UTC+2)	Ajer (yellow card) 58'	Summary	Abdullahi 27'; Sverrisson (yellow card) 54'; Danielsen (yellow card) 60'	Stadium: Sør Arena; Attendance: 6,112; Referee: Trygve Kjensli

10 April 2016 4	Start	1–1	Molde	Kristiansand
18:00 CEST (UTC+2)	Nwakali (yellow card) 60'; Kristjánsson (yellow card) 79'; Rasmussen 90+2'	Summary	Strand (yellow card) 27', (goal) 57'; Aursnes (yellow card) 38'; Svendsen (yellow card) 45'; Elyounoussi (yellow card) 54'	Stadium: Sør Arena; Attendance: 4,209; Referee: Espen Eskås

17 April 2016 5	Odd	3–0	Start	Skien
20:00 CEST (UTC+2)	Occéan (penalty missed); Nordkvelle 32'; Berge 39', 69'; Ruud (yellow card) 89'	Summary	Kristjánsson (yellow card) 38'; Sandnes (yellow card) 89'	Stadium: Skagerak Arena; Attendance: 6,440; Referee: Kai Erik Steen

21 April 2016 6	Start	1–4	Sarpsborg 08	Kristiansand
19:00 CET (UTC+2)	Heikkilä 11'; Ajer (yellow card) 82'	Summary	Tokstad 3', 23', 75'; Mortensen 33'	Stadium: Sør Arena; Attendance: 3,692; Referee: Trond Ivar Døvle

24 April 2016 7	Vålerenga	2–0	Start	Oslo
20:00 CEST (UTC+2)	Brown 6', 89'; Castro (yellow card) 32'	Summary		Stadium: Ullevaal Stadion; Attendance: 6,379; Referee: Svein Oddvar Moen

1 May 2016 8	Start	2–2	Strømsgodset	Kristiansand
18:00 CEST (UTC+2)	Sandnes 52'; Salvesen 88'	Summary	Abu (yellow card) 9'; Storflor 41'; Nguen 63'; Valsvik (yellow card) 72'	Stadium: Sør Arena; Attendance: 4,248; Referee: Trygve Kjensli

7 May 2016 9	Brann	1–0	Start	Bergen
20:00 CEST (UTC+2)	Skålevik 61'; Nilsen (yellow card) 85'	Summary	Ajer (yellow card) 45+1'; Nwakali (yellow card) 67'	Stadium: Brann Stadion; Attendance: 9,767; Referee: Espen Eskås

12 May 2016 10	Start	0–2	Rosenborg	Kristiansand
19:00 CEST (UTC+2)	Kristjánsson (yellow card) 23'	Summary	Svensson (yellow card) 71'; Gytkjær (yellow card) 75'; Vilhjálmsson 80', 88'	Stadium: Sør Arena; Attendance: 5,006; Referee: Ola Hobber Nilsen

16 May 2016 11	Aalesund	1–1	Start	Ålesund
15:30 CEST (UTC+2)	B.H.Riise (yellow card) 61'; Skagestad 78'	Summary	Nwakali 65'	Stadium: Color Line Stadion; Attendance: 6,751; Referee: Tommy Skjerven

22 May 2016 12	Sogndal	2–2	Start	Sogndalsfjøra
18:00 CEST (UTC+2)	Psyché 10' 53'; Kjemhus (yellow card) 37'; Sarr (yellow card) 84'	Summary	DeJohn (yellow card) 15' (goal) 62'; Hoff 81'	Stadium: Fosshaugane Campus; Attendance: 2,770; Referee: Kai Erik Steen

29 May 2016 13	Start	0–5	Stabæk	Kristiansand
18:00 CEST (UTC+2)	Sandnes (yellow card) 90'	Summary	Omoijuanfo 33'; Issah (yellow card) 36'; Gorozia 41'; Jeppe Moe (yellow card) 45'; Asante (yellow card) 66'; Njie 78' 89'; Meling 87'	Stadium: Sør Arena; Attendance: 7,273; Referee: Trond Ivar Døvle

2 July 2016 14	Haugesund	2–1	Start	Haugesund
15:30 CEST (UTC+2)	Skjerve 49'; Miljeteig 67'	Summary	Rasmussen 15'	Stadium: Haugesund Stadion; Attendance: 5,106; Referee: Ola Hobber Nilsen

8 July 2016 15	Start	1–4	Bodø/Glimt	Kristiansand
19:00 CEST (UTC+2)	Nwakali 57'	Summary	Olsen 32'; Moe (yellow card) 55'; Furebotn 67'; Azemi 90'; Hauge 90+4' (pen.)	Stadium: Sør Arena; Attendance: 4,318; Referee: Martin Lundby

17 July 2016 16	Molde	2–2	Start	Molde
18:00 CEST (UTC+2)	Singh (yellow card) 7'; Svendsen 21'; Toivio 72'; Forren (yellow card) 90+1'	Summary	Børufsen 8' (yellow card) 60'; Kristjánsson 62' (yellow card) 67'; Nwakali (yellow card) 73'; Heikkilä (yellow card) 83'	Stadium: Aker Stadion; Attendance: 8,508; Referee: Espen Eskås

24 July 2016 17	Start	2–4	Vålerenga	Kristiansand
15:30 CEST (UTC+2)	Børufsen 78', 84'	Summary	Abdellaoue (yellow card) 11'; Tollås 23'; Zahid 53'; Grindheim 81'; Johansen 88'	Stadium: Sør Arena; Attendance: 5,022; Referee: Svein Oddvar Moen

29 July 2016 18	Sarpsborg 08	1–0	Start	Sarpsborg
19:00 CEST (UTC+2)	Lindberg (yellow card) 69' (goal) 78'; Toivomäki (yellow card) 76'; Hansen (yellow card) 82'	Summary	Salvesen (yellow card) 18'; Johnson (yellow card) 23'; Vikstøl (yellow card) 82'	Stadium: Sarpsborg Stadion; Attendance: 3,757; Referee: Trygve Kjensli

7 August 2016 19	Start	1–2	Odd	Kristiansand
18:00 CEST (UTC+2)	Johnson 12' (pen.); Aase (yellow card) 39'	Summary	Bentley 53'; O.Berg (yellow card) 77'; Occéan 81'	Stadium: Sør Arena; Attendance: 3,810; Referee: Trond Ivar Døvle

14 August 2016 20	Strømsgodset	1–1	Start	Drammen
18:00 CEST (UTC+2)	Pedersen 27' (pen.) (yellow card) 45'; Madsen (yellow card) 87'; Kastrati (yellow card) 90+2'	Summary	Robstad (yellow card) 16'; Johnson (yellow card) 27'; Vikstøl (yellow card) 77'; Bojang (yellow card) 81'; Salvesen 86'	Stadium: Marienlyst Stadion; Referee: Kai Erik Steen

21 August 2016 21	Start	1–1	Sogndal	Kristiansand
18:00 CEST (UTC+2)	Børufsen (yellow card) 13'; Johnson (yellow card) 82'; Salvesen 89'	Summary	Furebotn 7'; Pedersen (yellow card) 55'; Raitala (yellow card) 81'	Stadium: Sør Arena; Attendance: 4,157; Referee: Kristoffer Hagenes

28 August 2016 22	Bodø/Glimt	2–0	Start	Bodø
18:00 CEST (UTC+2)	Jakobsen (yellow card) 26'; Azemi 60'; Halvorsen 63' (pen.) (yellow card) 71'	Report		Stadium: Aspmyra Stadion; Attendance: 3,087; Referee: Martin Lundby

9 September 2016 23	Start	1–4	Aalesund	Kristiansand
19:00 CEST (UTC+2)	Antwi (yellow card) 8'; E.Segberg (yellow card) 11'; Nwakali 18'	Report	Wormgoor (yellow card) 27'; B.H.Riise 51'; Boli (yellow card) 58' (goal) 87'; Þrándarson 74'; Fet 76'	Stadium: Sør Arena; Attendance: 3,401; Referee: Tommy Skjerven

18 September 2016 24	Rosenborg	2–0	Start	Trondheim
20:00 CEST (UTC+2)	Gytkjær 61'; Reitan 90' (pen.); Bjørdal (yellow card) 90'	Summary	E.Wichne (yellow card) 85'	Stadium: Lerkendal Stadion; Attendance: 14,142; Referee: Kai Erik Steen

25 September 2016 25	Start	1–0	Haugesund	Kristiansand
18:00 CEST (UTC+2)	Skogmo (yellow card) 66'; Antwi (yellow card) 72'; Sigurdsen 83'	Summary		Stadium: Sør Arena; Attendance: 4,150; Referee: Trygve Kjensli

2 October 2016 26	Viking	2–0	Start	Stavanger
20:00 CEST (UTC+2)	Heikkilä 26' (o.g.); Jørgensen 67'	Summary	Robstad (yellow card) 52'	Stadium: Viking Stadion; Attendance: 8,371; Referee: Trond Ivar Døvle

16 October 2016 27	Start	2–1	Tromsø	Kristiansand
15:30 CEST (UTC+2)	E.Segberg 14'; Salvesen 28'; Skogmo (yellow card) 59'; Vikstøl (red card) 77'; Sandnes (yellow card) 90+1'	Summary	Olsen 4'; Ødegaard (yellow card) 62'; Ingebrigtsen (yellow card) 64'; Antonsen (yellow card) 78'	Stadium: Sør Arena; Attendance: 3,440; Referee: Rohit Saggi

23 October 2016 28	Lillestrøm	1–1	Start	Lillestrøm
18:00 CEST (UTC+2)	Kolstad (yellow card) 41'; Malec 61'	Summary	Antwi 25' (yellow card) 26'	Stadium: Åråsen Stadion; Attendance: 8,796; Referee: Espen Eskås

30 October 2016 29	Start	1–2	Brann	Kristiansand
18:00 CET (UTC+1)	Heikkilä (yellow card) 17'; Sandnes 66'	Summary	Braaten (yellow card) 53'; Grønner (yellow card) 55'; Huseklepp 71'; Haugen 78'	Stadium: Sør Arena; Attendance: 4,524; Referee: Tom Harald Hagen

6 November 2016 30	Stabæk	3–0	Start	Bærum
18:00 CET (UTC+1)	Omoijuanfo 27', 32'; Keita (yellow card) 70'; Alanzinho 76'	Summary	Hollingen (yellow card) 13'; Salvesen (yellow card) 66'	Stadium: Nadderud Stadion; Attendance: 4,350; Referee: Svein-Erik Edvartsen

==== Table ====
Pos	Team	Pld	W	D	L	GF	GA	GD	Pts	Qualification or relegation
12	Lillestrøm	30	8	10	12	45	50	−5	34	
13	Tromsø	30	9	7	14	36	46	−10	34	
14	Stabæk (O)	30	8	7	15	35	42	−7	31	Qualification for the relegation play-offs
15	Bodø/Glimt (R)	30	8	6	16	36	45	−9	30	Relegation to First Division
16	Start (R)	30	2	10	18	23	59	−36	16	Relegation to First Division

Source: Football Association of Norway (in Norwegian), Soccerway
Rules for classification: 1) Points; 2) Goal difference; 3) Goals scored; 4) Head-to-head points; 5) Head-to-head goal difference; 6) Head-to-head away goals scored (between two teams).
(O) Play-off winners; (R) Relegated

=== Norwegian Cup ===
14 April 2016 First Round	Donn	0–8	Start	Kristiansand
18:00 CEST (UTC+2)	F. Kviljo (yellow card) 35'; M. Myhrstad (yellow card) 52' (yellow-red card) 79'	Summary	Vikstøl 40'; Sandnes (yellow card) 46', (goal) 52'; Ajer 47'; Sigurdsen 55', 90+3'; Rasmussen 83' (pen.); Segberg 86'; Salvesen 90+1'	Stadium: Kristiansand Stadion; Attendance: 533; Referee: Marius Lien

27 April 2016 Second Round	Fram Larvik	0–3	Start	Larvik
18:00 CEST (UTC+2)	M. Naglestad (yellow card) 33'; A. Sagaas (yellow card) 39'	Summary	Børufsen (yellow card) 17'; Nwakali 71'; Sandnes 73', (yellow card) 84'; Wichne 81'	Stadium: Fram Stadion; Attendance: 952; Referee: Rohit Saggi

4 May 2016 Third Round	Sandnes Ulf	3–1	Start	Sandnes
18:00 CEST (UTC+2)	Eriksen 7', 16'; Schulze (yellow card) 46'; Helle (yellow card) 65'; Engblom 75'; Sandberg (yellow card) 90'	Summary	DeJohn (yellow card) 14'; Salvesen 54'; Nwakali (yellow card) 80'	Stadium: Sandnes Idrettspark; Attendance: 841; Referee: Rohit Saggi

== Squad statistics ==
As of match played 6 November 2016

=== Appearances and goals ===
No.	Pos	Nat	Player	Total		Tippeligaen		Norwegian Cup	
No.	Pos	Nat	Player	Apps	Goals	Apps	Goals	Apps	Goals
1	GK	(Norway) NOR	Håkon Opdal	31	0	30	0	1	0
2	DF	(Norway) NOR	Jens Kristian Skogmo	22	0	19+1	0	2	0
3	DF	(Finland) FIN	Tapio Heikkilä	32	2	30	2	2	0
4	DF	(United States) USA	Alex DeJohn	21	1	17+2	1	2	0
5	DF	(Norway) NOR	Robert Sandnes	24	4	8+14	2	1+1	2
7	MF	(Nigeria) NGR	Chidiebere Nwakali	24	4	21+1	3	2	1
8	FW	(Norway) NOR	Espen Hoff	16	1	9+7	1	0	0
9	FW	(Norway) NOR	Daniel Aase	11	0	5+5	0	1	0
10	MF	(Liberia) LBR	Dulee Johnson	8	1	7+1	1	0	0
11	FW	(Nigeria) NGR	Uduak Cyril Idemokon	3	0	3	0	0	0
14	MF	(Norway) NOR	Espen Børufsen	28	3	27	3	1	0
15	DF	(Norway) NOR	Henrik Robstad	32	0	29	0	3	0
16	MF	(Norway) NOR	Andreas Hollingen	15	0	12+3	0	0	0
17	MF	(Iceland) ISL	Guðmundur Kristjánsson	25	1	14+8	1	2+1	0
18	MF	(Norway) NOR	Jibril Bojang	9	0	4+5	0	0	0
19	MF	(Nigeria) NGR	Austin Ikenna	5	0	2+1	0	0+2	0
21	MF	(Norway) NOR	Henrik Breimyr	1	0	0	0	0+1	0
22	FW	(Norway) NOR	Lars-Jørgen Salvesen	28	6	13+13	4	0+2	2
23	MF	(Norway) NOR	Erlend Segberg	11	2	9+1	1	1	1
25	GK	(Ireland) EIR	Sean McDermott	2	0	0	0	2	0
27	MF	(Norway) NOR	Eirik Wichne	22	1	14+6	0	2	1
28	DF	(Norway) NOR	Rolf Daniel Vikstøl	24	1	20+1	0	3	1
29	MF	(Bosnia and Herzegovina) BIH	Adi Markovic	2	0	0	0	0+2	0
30	FW	(Norway) NOR	Lasse Sigurdsen	18	3	4+12	1	2	2
33	FW	(Ghana) GHA	Denny Antwi	11	1	10+1	1	0	0
Players away from the club on loan:
Players who played for Start that left during the season:
6	MF	(Norway) NOR	Kristoffer Ajer	14	1	11	0	3	1
32	MF	(Norway) NOR	Mathias Rasmussen	18	3	11+4	2	3	1

=== Goal scorers ===
Place	Position	Nation	Number	Name	Tippeligaen	Norwegian Cup	Total
1	FW	(Norway)	22	Lars-Jørgen Salvesen	4	2	6
2	MF	(Nigeria)	7	Chidiebere Nwakali	3	1	4
2	DF	(Norway)	5	Robert Sandnes	2	2	4
4	MF	(Norway)	14	Espen Børufsen	3	0	3
4	MF	(Norway)	32	Mathias Rasmussen	2	1	3
6	DF	(Finland)	3	Tapio Heikkilä	2	0	2
6	MF	(Norway)	23	Erlend Segberg	1	1	2
6	FW	(Norway)	30	Lasse Sigurdsen	0	2	2
9	DF	(United States)	4	Alex DeJohn	1	0	1
9	MF	(Norway)	8	Espen Hoff	1	0	1
9	MF	(Iceland)	17	Espen Børufsen	1	0	1
9	MF	(Liberia)	10	Dulee Johnson	1	0	1
9	FW	(Norway)	30	Lasse Sigurdsen	1	0	1
9	FW	(Ghana)	33	Denny Antwi	1	0	1
9	MF	(Norway)	6	Kristoffer Ajer	0	1	1
9	MF	(Norway)	27	Eirik Wichne	0	1	1
9	DF	(Norway)	28	Rolf Daniel Vikstøl	0	1	1
				TOTALS	23	12	35

=== Disciplinary record ===
Number	Nation	Position	Name	Tippeligaen		Norwegian Cup		Total	
Number	Nation	Position	Name	Yellow card	Red card	Yellow card	Red card	Yellow card	Red card
2	(Norway)	DF	Jens Kristian Skogmo	2	0	0	0	2	0
3	(Finland)	DF	Tapio Heikkilä	2	0	0	0	2	0
4	(United States)	DF	Alex DeJohn	1	0	1	0	2	0
5	(Norway)	DF	Robert Sandnes	3	0	2	0	5	0
6	(Norway)	MF	Kristoffer Ajer	4	0	0	0	4	0
7	(Nigeria)	MF	Chidiebere Nwakali	3	0	1	0	4	0
9	(Norway)	FW	Daniel Aase	1	0	0	0	1	0
10	(Liberia)	MF	Dulee Johnson	3	0	0	0	3	0
14	(Norway)	MF	Espen Børufsen	2	0	1	0	3	0
15	(Norway)	DF	Henrik Robstad	2	0	0	0	2	0
16	(Norway)	MF	Andreas Hollingen	2	0	0	0	2	0
17	(Iceland)	MF	Guðmundur Kristjánsson	4	0	0	0	4	0
18	(Norway)	MF	Jibril Bojang	1	0	0	0	1	0
22	(Norway)	FW	Lars-Jørgen Salvesen	2	0	0	0	2	0
23	(Norway)	MF	Erlend Segberg	1	0	0	0	1	0
27	(Norway)	MF	Eirik Wichne	1	0	0	0	1	0
28	(Norway)	DF	Rolf Daniel Vikstøl	2	1	0	0	2	1
33	(Ghana)	FW	Denny Antwi	3	0	0	0	3	0
			TOTALS	39	1	5	0	44	1
