= List of Norwegian football transfers summer 2015 =

This is a list of Norwegian football transfers in the summer transfer window 2015 by club. Only clubs of the 2015 Tippeligaen and 2015 Norwegian First Division are included. The registration period opened on 22 July and closed on 18 August.

== 2015 Tippeligaen ==
=== Bodø/Glimt ===
In: Note: Flags indicate national team as defined under FIFA eligibility rules; some limited exceptions apply. Players may hold more than one non-FIFA nationality.

No.	Pos.	Nation	Player
9	FW	NOR	Jim Johansen (loan return from (Norway) Sogndal)
19	DF	NOR	Erik Tønne (from (Norway) Sandnes Ulf)
34	DF	NOR	Fredrik André Bjørkan (Promoted)

Out: Note: Flags indicate national team as defined under FIFA eligibility rules; some limited exceptions apply. Players may hold more than one non-FIFA nationality.

No.	Pos.	Nation	Player
4	DF	POR	Joshua Silva (to (Germany) Viktoria 1889 Berlin)
7	MF	SEN	Badou (to (Turkey) Osmanlıspor)
20	FW	NOR	Ulrik Berglann (on loan to (Norway) Strømmen)
22	DF	NOR	Martin Pedersen (on loan to (Norway) Finnsnes)

=== Haugesund ===
In: Note: Flags indicate national team as defined under FIFA eligibility rules; some limited exceptions apply. Players may hold more than one non-FIFA nationality.

No.	Pos.	Nation	Player
5	DF	NGA	William Troost-Ekong (on loan from (Belgium) Gent)
6	MF	SVK	Filip Kiss (on loan from (Wales) Cardiff City)
9	FW	SRB	Nikola Komazec (loan return from (Thailand) Pattaya United)
14	FW	NOR	Torbjørn Agdestein (loan return from (Norway) Kristiansund)
16	MF	NGA	Sad'eeq Yusuf (on loan from (Belgium) Gent)
21	FW	NGA	Adamu Abubakar (from (Nigeria) GBS Academy)
26	DF	NOR	Sverre Bjørkkjær (loan return from (Norway) Åsane)
—	MF	NOR	Kevin Martin Krygård (Promoted)

Out: Note: Flags indicate national team as defined under FIFA eligibility rules; some limited exceptions apply. Players may hold more than one non-FIFA nationality.

No.	Pos.	Nation	Player
6	MF	DEN	Patrick Olsen (released)
21	FW	FIN	Roope Riski (on loan to (Finland) Seinäjoen)
27	FW	NOR	Tor André Aasheim (to (Iceland) Breiðablik)
50	DF	SRB	Dušan Cvetinović (on loan to (France) Lens)

=== Lillestrøm ===
In: Note: Flags indicate national team as defined under FIFA eligibility rules; some limited exceptions apply. Players may hold more than one non-FIFA nationality.

No.	Pos.	Nation	Player
2	DF	NED	Michael Timisela (free agent)
8	MF	FRA	Malaury Martin (from (Norway) Sandnes Ulf)
16	DF	NOR	Håkon Skogseid (free agent)
—	DF	SWE	Martin Falkeborn (from (Norway) Egersunds, from 1 Jan 2016)

Out: Note: Flags indicate national team as defined under FIFA eligibility rules; some limited exceptions apply. Players may hold more than one non-FIFA nationality.

No.	Pos.	Nation	Player
8	MF	NOR	Bjørn Helge Riise (to (Norway) Aalesund)
21	FW	CIV	Moryké Fofana (to (France) Lorient)
90	FW	NOR	Amahl Pellegrino (to (Norway) Mjøndalen)

=== Mjøndalen ===
In: Note: Flags indicate national team as defined under FIFA eligibility rules; some limited exceptions apply. Players may hold more than one non-FIFA nationality.

No.	Pos.	Nation	Player
6	MF	NZL	Craig Henderson (on loan from (Norway) Stabæk)
17	FW	NOR	Amahl Pellegrino (from (Norway) Lillestrøm)
19	FW	NOR	Tokmac Nguen (on loan from (Norway) Strømsgodset)
20	FW	SEN	Ousseynou Boye (from (Senegal) Diambars)
23	FW	USA	Erik Hurtado (on loan from (Canada) Vancouver Whitecaps)
24	MF	NOR	Henrik Gulden (on loan from (Germany) VfL Bochum)
30	GK	DEN	Marco Priis Jørgensen (free agent)

Out: Note: Flags indicate national team as defined under FIFA eligibility rules; some limited exceptions apply. Players may hold more than one non-FIFA nationality.

No.	Pos.	Nation	Player
6	MF	NOR	Michael Stilson (on loan to (Norway) Ranheim)
12	GK	NOR	Andreas Håskjold (to (Norway) Nesodden)
17	MF	NOR	Erlend Skagestad (on loan to (Norway) Modum)
19	DF	NOR	Joakim Mohn Rishovd (to (Norway) Modum)
20	FW	GAM	Alagie Sosseh (to (Norway) Nest-Sotra)
23	FW	NOR	Tim André Nilsen (on loan to (Norway) Fredrikstad)
24	MF	SEN	Amidou Diop (loan return to (Norway) Molde)

=== Molde ===
In: Note: Flags indicate national team as defined under FIFA eligibility rules; some limited exceptions apply. Players may hold more than one non-FIFA nationality.

No.	Pos.	Nation	Player
3	MF	SEN	Amidou Diop (loan return from (Norway) Mjøndalen)

Out: Note: Flags indicate national team as defined under FIFA eligibility rules; some limited exceptions apply. Players may hold more than one non-FIFA nationality.

No.	Pos.	Nation	Player
10	MF	NOR	Thomas Kind Bendiksen (on loan to (Norway) Tromsø)
12	GK	NOR	Ørjan Nyland (to (Germany) FC Ingolstadt 04)
30	FW	SEN	Pape Paté Diouf (on loan to (Norway) Odd)
42	DF	NOR	Eirik Haugen (to (France) Marseille)

=== Odd ===
In: Note: Flags indicate national team as defined under FIFA eligibility rules; some limited exceptions apply. Players may hold more than one non-FIFA nationality.

No.	Pos.	Nation	Player
9	FW	SEN	Pape Paté Diouf (on loan from (Norway) Molde)
10	FW	CAN	Olivier Occéan (from (Germany) Eintracht Frankfurt)
12	FW	NOR	Ulrik Flo (from (Norway) Sogndal)

Out: Note: Flags indicate national team as defined under FIFA eligibility rules; some limited exceptions apply. Players may hold more than one non-FIFA nationality.

No.	Pos.	Nation	Player
10	FW	CAN	Olivier Occéan (loan return to (Germany) Eintracht Frankfurt)

=== Rosenborg ===
In: Note: Flags indicate national team as defined under FIFA eligibility rules; some limited exceptions apply. Players may hold more than one non-FIFA nationality.

No.	Pos.	Nation	Player
10	FW	ISL	Matthías Vilhjálmsson (from (Norway) Start)
14	DF	NOR	Johan Lædre Bjørdal (from (Denmark) AGF)
18	MF	NOR	Magnus Stamnestrø (from (Norway) Kristiansund)
19	FW	NOR	Yann-Erik de Lanlay (from (Norway) Viking)
24	MF	NOR	Anders Konradsen (from (France) Rennes)

Out: Note: Flags indicate national team as defined under FIFA eligibility rules; some limited exceptions apply. Players may hold more than one non-FIFA nationality.

No.	Pos.	Nation	Player
5	DF	NOR	Per Verner Rønning (to (Norway) Levanger, previously on loan)
9	FW	FIN	Riku Riski (on loan to (Sweden) IFK Göteborg)
10	FW	SVK	Tomáš Malec (loan return to (Slovakia) Trenčín)
17	FW	DEN	Emil Nielsen (on loan to (Denmark) AGF)
18	MF	SCO	Liam Henderson (loan return to (Scotland) Celtic)
24	DF	NOR	Stefan Strandberg (to (Russia) Krasnodar)
31	MF	NOR	Bent Sørmo (to (Norway) Levanger, previously on loan)
33	GK	NOR	Jacob Storevik (to (Norway) Levanger)

=== Sandefjord ===
In: Note: Flags indicate national team as defined under FIFA eligibility rules; some limited exceptions apply. Players may hold more than one non-FIFA nationality.

No.	Pos.	Nation	Player
2	DF	NOR	Lars Grorud (from (Norway) Fram Larvik)
6	MF	ESP	Pau Morer Vicente (from (Spain) Girona)
12	GK	NOR	Anders Gundersen (on loan from (Norway) Strømsgodset)
15	MF	NOR	Martin Andresen (free agent)
40	GK	IRL	Gary Hogan (from (Norway) Ullern)

Out: Note: Flags indicate national team as defined under FIFA eligibility rules; some limited exceptions apply. Players may hold more than one non-FIFA nationality.

No.	Pos.	Nation	Player
6	MF	NOR	Roger Risholt (to (Norway) Fredrikstad)
12	GK	NOR	Lars Herlofsen (released)
16	FW	NOR	Pål Alexander Kirkevold (to (Denmark) Hobro)
22	MF	NOR	André Sødlund (on loan to (Norway) Nest-Sotra)
23	MF	NOR	Mats Haakenstad (to (Norway) Fram Larvik)
40	GK	DEN	Michael Tørnes (released)

=== Sarpsborg 08 ===
In: Note: Flags indicate national team as defined under FIFA eligibility rules; some limited exceptions apply. Players may hold more than one non-FIFA nationality.

No.	Pos.	Nation	Player
1	GK	DEN	Lasse Heinze (from (Denmark) Midtjylland)
8	FW	NGA	Kachi (from (Nigeria) Gee Lec IFA)
10	MF	NED	Barry Maguire (free agent)
28	FW	HUN	Péter Kovács (from (Norway) Strømsgodset)
29	DF	NOR	Alexander Groven (from (Norway) Hønefoss)
31	GK	NOR	Christian Sukke (loan return from (Norway) Sogndal)
—	FW	NOR	Amani Dickson Mbedule (from (Norway) Trosvik)

Out: Note: Flags indicate national team as defined under FIFA eligibility rules; some limited exceptions apply. Players may hold more than one non-FIFA nationality.

No.	Pos.	Nation	Player
5	MF	NOR	Olav Øby (on loan to (Norway) Follo)
8	FW	EST	Henrik Ojamaa (loan return to (Poland) Legia Warsaw)
10	MF	SWE	Liridon Kalludra (to (Norway) Kristiansund)
14	FW	NOR	Badr Rahhaoui (on loan to (Norway) Kvik Halden)
21	FW	DEN	Oliver Feldballe (to (Denmark) Fredericia)
22	MF	DEN	Claes Kronberg (to (Norway) Viking, to 1. Jan 2016)
31	GK	NOR	Christian Sukke (on loan to (Norway) Ull/Kisa)
45	GK	USA	Quentin Westberg (to (France) Tours)
—	DF	NOR	Andreas Melleby (on loan to (Norway) Kvik Halden)

=== Stabæk ===
In: Note: Flags indicate national team as defined under FIFA eligibility rules; some limited exceptions apply. Players may hold more than one non-FIFA nationality.

No.	Pos.	Nation	Player
6	MF	GHA	Anthony Annan (free agent)
77	FW	NOR	Muhamed Keita (on loan from (Poland) Lech Poznań)
—	FW	NOR	Emil Dahle (loan return from (Norway) Start)

Out: Note: Flags indicate national team as defined under FIFA eligibility rules; some limited exceptions apply. Players may hold more than one non-FIFA nationality.

No.	Pos.	Nation	Player
2	DF	RUS	Yevgeni Kirisov (released)
5	DF	NOR	Jørgen Hammer (to (Norway) Start)
10	FW	NOR	Adama Diomande (to (England) Hull City)
14	FW	NOR	Emil Ekblom (on loan to (Norway) Strømmen)
18	MF	NZL	Craig Henderson (on loan to (Norway) Mjøndalen)
—	FW	NOR	Emil Dahle (on loan to (Norway) Bryne)

=== Start ===
In: Note: Flags indicate national team as defined under FIFA eligibility rules; some limited exceptions apply. Players may hold more than one non-FIFA nationality.

No.	Pos.	Nation	Player
9	FW	NOR	Daniel Aase (on loan from (Norway) Vindbjart)
18	FW	NOR	Mads Stokkelien (free agent)
19	FW	NGA	Austin Ikenna (from (Kenya) Leopards)
21	MF	NOR	Henrik Breimyr (from (Norway) Bryne)
25	GK	IRL	Sean McDermott (from (Norway) Sandnes Ulf)
33	DF	NOR	Jørgen Hammer (from (Norway) Stabæk)
—	MF	NOR	Tobias Christensen (from (Norway) Vigør)

Out: Note: Flags indicate national team as defined under FIFA eligibility rules; some limited exceptions apply. Players may hold more than one non-FIFA nationality.

No.	Pos.	Nation	Player
9	FW	NOR	Emil Dahle (loan return to (Norway) Stabæk)
10	MF	NGA	Solomon Owello (to (Norway) Sandnes Ulf)
18	FW	ISL	Matthías Vilhjálmsson (to (Norway) Rosenborg)
20	DF	NOR	John Olav Norheim (on loan to (Norway) Nest-Sotra)
25	GK	ISL	Ingvar Jónsson (on loan to (Norway) Sandnes Ulf)

=== Strømsgodset ===
In: Note: Flags indicate national team as defined under FIFA eligibility rules; some limited exceptions apply. Players may hold more than one non-FIFA nationality.

No.	Pos.	Nation	Player
10	FW	NOR	Marcus Pedersen (from (Norway) Brann)
30	GK	POL	Łukasz Jarosiński (from (Norway) Hønefoss)
33	FW	NGA	Marco Tagbajumi (on loan from (Cyprus) Limassol)
—	FW	NOR	Abdul-Basit Agouda (loan return from (Norway) Skeid)

Out: Note: Flags indicate national team as defined under FIFA eligibility rules; some limited exceptions apply. Players may hold more than one non-FIFA nationality.

No.	Pos.	Nation	Player
10	FW	HUN	Péter Kovács (to (Norway) Sarpsborg 08)
12	GK	NOR	Borger Thomas (on loan to (Norway) HamKam)
13	GK	NOR	Anders Gundersen (on loan to (Norway) Sandefjord)
58	DF	NOR	Christoffer Lindquist (on loan to Hønefoss)
93	FW	NOR	Tokmac Nguen (on loan to (Norway) Mjøndalen)

=== Tromsø ===
In: Note: Flags indicate national team as defined under FIFA eligibility rules; some limited exceptions apply. Players may hold more than one non-FIFA nationality.

No.	Pos.	Nation	Player
21	MF	NOR	Thomas Kind Bendiksen (on loan from (Norway) Molde)
48	MF	CRO	Marin Oršulić (from (Bulgaria) CSKA Sofia)

Out: Note: Flags indicate national team as defined under FIFA eligibility rules; some limited exceptions apply. Players may hold more than one non-FIFA nationality.

No.	Pos.	Nation	Player
10	MF	NOR	Thomas Drage (to (Norway) Sogndal)

=== Viking ===
In: Note: Flags indicate national team as defined under FIFA eligibility rules; some limited exceptions apply. Players may hold more than one non-FIFA nationality.

No.	Pos.	Nation	Player
10	FW	ENG	Kieffer Moore (from (England) Yeovil Town)
24	DF	NOR	Aleksander Solli (from (Norway) Hønefoss)
—	MF	DEN	Claes Kronberg (from (Norway) Sarpsborg 08, from 1. Jan 2016)

Out: Note: Flags indicate national team as defined under FIFA eligibility rules; some limited exceptions apply. Players may hold more than one non-FIFA nationality.

No.	Pos.	Nation	Player
9	MF	NOR	Magne Hoseth (released)
10	FW	NOR	Veton Berisha (to (Germany) Greuther Fürth)
16	FW	NOR	Yann-Erik de Lanlay (to (Norway) Rosenborg)
18	FW	NGA	Osita Henry Chikere (released)
22	MF	NOR	Fábian Alonso Calderon (to (Norway) Sola)
—	FW	NOR	Martin Hummervoll (on loan to (Iceland) Keflavík)

=== Vålerenga ===
In: Note: Flags indicate national team as defined under FIFA eligibility rules; some limited exceptions apply. Players may hold more than one non-FIFA nationality.

No.	Pos.	Nation	Player
3	DF	EST	Enar Jääger (on loan from (Estonia) Flora Tallinn)
5	DF	SWE	Robert Lundström (from (Sweden) Sundsvall)
8	MF	SWE	Melker Hallberg (on loan from (Italy) Udinese)
18	FW	NOR	Mohammed Abdellaoue (from (Germany) VfB Stuttgart)
38	GK	GER	Sascha Burchert (on loan from (Germany) Hertha Berlin)
38	GK	FIN	Otto Fredrikson (on loan from (Norway) Kongsvinger)

Out: Note: Flags indicate national team as defined under FIFA eligibility rules; some limited exceptions apply. Players may hold more than one non-FIFA nationality.

No.	Pos.	Nation	Player
2	DF	NOR	Niklas Gunnarsson (on loan to (Sweden) Elfsborg)
3	DF	NOR	Ruben Kristiansen (to (Norway) Brann)
8	MF	NOR	Sivert Heltne Nilsen (to (Norway) Brann)
18	FW	NOR	Moussa Njie (to (Norway) Bærum)
38	GK	FIN	Otto Fredrikson (loan return to (Norway) Kongsvinger)

=== Aalesund ===
In: Note: Flags indicate national team as defined under FIFA eligibility rules; some limited exceptions apply. Players may hold more than one non-FIFA nationality.

No.	Pos.	Nation	Player
15	MF	BRA	Marlinho (from (Brazil) Duque de Caxias)
16	MF	NOR	Magne Hoseth (free agent)
21	MF	NOR	Bjørn Helge Riise (from (Norway) Lillestrøm)
24	GK	NOR	Helge Sandvik (on loan from (Norway) Vard Haugesund)

Out: Note: Flags indicate national team as defined under FIFA eligibility rules; some limited exceptions apply. Players may hold more than one non-FIFA nationality.

No.	Pos.	Nation	Player
7	MF	FIN	Sakari Mattila (to (England) Fulham)
24	GK	NOR	Helge Sandvik (loan return to (Norway) Vard Haugesund)
31	MF	CRC	Michael Barrantes (to (China) Shanghai Shenzin)
34	DF	NOR	Izatullah Ahmadzi (on loan to (Norway) Langevåg)
37	FW	NOR	Torbjørn Grytten (on loan to (Norway) Brattvåg)

== 1. Divisjon ==
=== Brann ===
In: Note: Flags indicate national team as defined under FIFA eligibility rules; some limited exceptions apply. Players may hold more than one non-FIFA nationality.

No.	Pos.	Nation	Player
10	MF	NOR	Steffen Lie Skålevik (from (Norway) Nest-Sotra)
17	DF	NOR	Viljar Vevatne (from (Norway) Bryne)
20	FW	NOR	Håkon Lorentzen (loan return from (Norway) Åsane)
21	DF	NOR	Ruben Kristiansen (from (Norway) Vålerenga)
23	MF	NOR	Sivert Heltne Nilsen (from (Norway) Vålerenga)
25	MF	LBR	Amadaiya Rennie (on loan from (Sweden) Hammarby)

Out: Note: Flags indicate national team as defined under FIFA eligibility rules; some limited exceptions apply. Players may hold more than one non-FIFA nationality.

No.	Pos.	Nation	Player
10	FW	SWE	Jakob Orlov (on loan to (Sweden) Hammarby)
16	MF	NOR	Emil Hansson (to (Netherlands) Feyenoord)
19	FW	NOR	Marcus Pedersen (to (Norway) Strømsgodset)
27	DF	SWE	Erdin Demir (to (Belgium) Waasland-Beveren)

=== Bryne ===
In: Note: Flags indicate national team as defined under FIFA eligibility rules; some limited exceptions apply. Players may hold more than one non-FIFA nationality.

No.	Pos.	Nation	Player
17	FW	NOR	Emil Dahle (on loan from (Norway) Stabæk, previously on loan to (Norway) Start)
18	FW	NOR	Mads Bøgild (from (Norway) Vidar)
19	MF	CRO	Branislav Bosnjak (free agent)
33	GK	NOR	Jonas Høidahl (from (Norway) Frøyland)

Out: Note: Flags indicate national team as defined under FIFA eligibility rules; some limited exceptions apply. Players may hold more than one non-FIFA nationality.

No.	Pos.	Nation	Player
7	MF	NOR	Henrik Breimyr (to (Norway) Start)
19	DF	NOR	Adnan Čaušević (to (Norway) Vard Haugesund)
23	DF	NOR	Viljar Vevatne (to (Norway) Brann)

=== Bærum ===
In: Note: Flags indicate national team as defined under FIFA eligibility rules; some limited exceptions apply. Players may hold more than one non-FIFA nationality.

No.	Pos.	Nation	Player
10	FW	NOR	Moussa Njie (from (Norway) Vålerenga)
16	DF	NOR	Hugues Wembangomo (free agent)
34	MF	SEN	Bocar Seck (from (France) Bordeaux)

Out: Note: Flags indicate national team as defined under FIFA eligibility rules; some limited exceptions apply. Players may hold more than one non-FIFA nationality.

No.	Pos.	Nation	Player
14	MF	USA	Bobby Warshaw (to (Norway) Hønefoss)
18	DF	NOR	Mats Walberg (on loan to (Norway) Nest-Sotra)
37	MF	NOR	Andreas Aalbu (to (Norway) Fredrikstad)

=== Follo ===
In: Note: Flags indicate national team as defined under FIFA eligibility rules; some limited exceptions apply. Players may hold more than one non-FIFA nationality.

No.	Pos.	Nation	Player
3	DF	NOR	Dadi Dodou Gaye (from (Norway) Lørenskog)
18	FW	SWE	Admir Bajrovic (on loan from (Sweden) Ljungskille)
33	MF	NOR	Olav Øby (on loan from (Norway) Sarpsborg 08)

Out: Note: Flags indicate national team as defined under FIFA eligibility rules; some limited exceptions apply. Players may hold more than one non-FIFA nationality.

No.	Pos.	Nation	Player
20	MF	NOR	Shadi Ali (on loan to (Norway) Ullern)

=== Fredrikstad ===
In: Note: Flags indicate national team as defined under FIFA eligibility rules; some limited exceptions apply. Players may hold more than one non-FIFA nationality.

No.	Pos.	Nation	Player
2	MF	NOR	Roger Risholt (from (Norway) Sandefjord)
14	MF	NOR	Andreas Aalbu (from (Norway) Bærum)
15	FW	NOR	Kenneth Di Vita Jensen (from (Norway) Lommedalen)
16	MF	NOR	Sulayman Jaborteh (on loan from (Norway) Moss)
22	MF	CIV	Hermann Pleple
23	FW	NOR	Tim André Nilsen (on loan from (Norway) Mjøndalen)

Out: Note: Flags indicate national team as defined under FIFA eligibility rules; some limited exceptions apply. Players may hold more than one non-FIFA nationality.

No.	Pos.	Nation	Player
7	FW	NOR	Rozhat Shaswari (to (Norway) Kristiansund)

=== Hødd ===
In: Note: Flags indicate national team as defined under FIFA eligibility rules; some limited exceptions apply. Players may hold more than one non-FIFA nationality.

No.	Pos.	Nation	Player
5	DF	FRA	Darnel Situ (free agent)
20	FW	NIR	Robin Shroot (from (Norway) Sogndal)

Out: Note: Flags indicate national team as defined under FIFA eligibility rules; some limited exceptions apply. Players may hold more than one non-FIFA nationality.

No.	Pos.	Nation	Player

=== Hønefoss ===
In: Note: Flags indicate national team as defined under FIFA eligibility rules; some limited exceptions apply. Players may hold more than one non-FIFA nationality.

No.	Pos.	Nation	Player
11	MF	NOR	Fitim Kastrati (free agent)
13	DF	NOR	Christoffer Lindquist (on loan from (Norway) Strømsgodset)
14	MF	USA	Bobby Warshaw (from (Norway) Bærum)
34	DF	NOR	Kristoffer Hay (Promoted)

Out: Note: Flags indicate national team as defined under FIFA eligibility rules; some limited exceptions apply. Players may hold more than one non-FIFA nationality.

No.	Pos.	Nation	Player
1	GK	POL	Łukasz Jarosiński (to (Norway) Strømsgodset)
5	DF	NOR	Aleksander Solli (to (Norway) Viking)
9	FW	SEN	Malick Mané (loan return to (Sweden) Göteborg)
11	FW	NOR	Øyvind Hoås (to (Norway) Kristiansund)
13	MF	FIN	Toni Kolehmainen (to (Finland) HJK Helsinki)
23	DF	NOR	Alexander Groven (to (Norway) Sarpsborg 08)

=== Jerv ===
In: Note: Flags indicate national team as defined under FIFA eligibility rules; some limited exceptions apply. Players may hold more than one non-FIFA nationality.

No.	Pos.	Nation	Player
20	FW	NOR	Jakob Erzeid Toft (from (Norway) Lyngdal)
33	FW	GHA	Denny Antwi (from (Sweden) Rosengård)

Out: Note: Flags indicate national team as defined under FIFA eligibility rules; some limited exceptions apply. Players may hold more than one non-FIFA nationality.

No.	Pos.	Nation	Player
14	FW	NOR	Tobias Olsvik (on loan to (Norway) Arendal)
21	FW	NOR	Henrik Dahlum (to (Norway) Fløy)

=== Kristiansund ===
In: Note: Flags indicate national team as defined under FIFA eligibility rules; some limited exceptions apply. Players may hold more than one non-FIFA nationality.

No.	Pos.	Nation	Player
9	FW	NOR	Øyvind Hoås (from (Norway) Hønefoss)
20	MF	SWE	Liridon Kalludra (from (Norway) Sarpsborg 08)
77	FW	NOR	Rozhat Shaswari (from (Norway) Fredrikstad)

Out: Note: Flags indicate national team as defined under FIFA eligibility rules; some limited exceptions apply. Players may hold more than one non-FIFA nationality.

No.	Pos.	Nation	Player
9	MF	NOR	Magnus Stamnestrø (to (Norway) Rosenborg)
13	FW	NOR	Torbjørn Agdestein (loan return to (Norway) Haugesund)
20	FW	NGA	George White (released)

=== Levanger ===
In: Note: Flags indicate national team as defined under FIFA eligibility rules; some limited exceptions apply. Players may hold more than one non-FIFA nationality.

No.	Pos.	Nation	Player
7	FW	NOR	Georg Flatgård (from (Norway) Rødde)
21	FW	NOR	Erlend Flø Gustad (promoted)
25	MF	NOR	Bent Sørmo (from (Norway) Rosenborg, previously on loan)
26	DF	NOR	Per Verner Rønning (from (Norway) Rosenborg, previously on loan)
33	GK	NOR	Jacob Storevik (from (Norway) Rosenborg)

Out: Note: Flags indicate national team as defined under FIFA eligibility rules; some limited exceptions apply. Players may hold more than one non-FIFA nationality.

No.	Pos.	Nation	Player
21	MF	SWE	Mathias Carlsson (retired)
—	MF	NOR	Andreas Skeie (to (Norway) Rørvik)

=== Nest-Sotra ===
In: Note: Flags indicate national team as defined under FIFA eligibility rules; some limited exceptions apply. Players may hold more than one non-FIFA nationality.

No.	Pos.	Nation	Player
3	DF	NOR	Mats Walberg (on loan from (Norway) Bærum)
7	FW	GAM	Alagie Sosseh (from (Norway) Mjøndalen)
11	MF	NOR	André Sødlund (on loan from (Norway) Sandefjord)
12	GK	NOR	Henrik Reite Hansen (on loan from (Norway) Fløya)
13	DF	NOR	John Olav Norheim (on loan from (Norway) Start)
16	DF	DEN	Mads Nielsen (from (Denmark) Brøndby)
21	MF	SWE	Petrit Zhubi (from (Sweden) GAIS)
24	MF	ISL	Aron Rúnarsson Heiðdal (from (Iceland) Stjarnan)
—	FW	NGA	George White (free agent)

Out: Note: Flags indicate national team as defined under FIFA eligibility rules; some limited exceptions apply. Players may hold more than one non-FIFA nationality.

No.	Pos.	Nation	Player
3	DF	SRB	Gojko Ivković (to (Norway) Lysekloster)
7	MF	NOR	Hassan Rahmani (to (Norway) Moss)
9	MF	NOR	Steffen Lie Skålevik (to (Norway) Brann)
11	FW	NOR	Marius Wichne (on loan to (Norway) Fana)
12	GK	NOR	Andreas Eikum (to (Norway) Fyllingsdalen)
13	DF	NOR	Øyvind Nilsen (on loan to (Norway) Fyllingsdalen)

=== Ranheim ===
In: Note: Flags indicate national team as defined under FIFA eligibility rules; some limited exceptions apply. Players may hold more than one non-FIFA nationality.

No.	Pos.	Nation	Player
21	MF	NOR	Michael Stilson (on loan from (Norway) Mjøndalen)

Out: Note: Flags indicate national team as defined under FIFA eligibility rules; some limited exceptions apply. Players may hold more than one non-FIFA nationality.

No.	Pos.	Nation	Player
17	MF	NOR	Asgeir Snekvik (on loan to (Norway) Byåsen)
18	DF	NOR	Vegard Fiske (on loan to (Norway) Stjørdals-Blink)
20	FW	NOR	Kim Riksvold (on loan to (Norway) Byåsen)

=== Sandnes Ulf ===
In: Note: Flags indicate national team as defined under FIFA eligibility rules; some limited exceptions apply. Players may hold more than one non-FIFA nationality.

No.	Pos.	Nation	Player
1	GK	ISL	Ingvar Jónsson (on loan from (Norway) Start)
18	MF	NGA	Solomon Owello (from (Norway) Start)
22	FW	ISL	Ólafur Karl Finsen (on loan from (Iceland) Stjarnan)

Out: Note: Flags indicate national team as defined under FIFA eligibility rules; some limited exceptions apply. Players may hold more than one non-FIFA nationality.

No.	Pos.	Nation	Player
1	GK	ISL	Hannes Þór Halldórsson (to (Netherlands) N.E.C.)
3	DF	SWE	Emil Johansson (to (Sweden) Degerfors)
4	MF	FRA	Malaury Martin (to (Norway) Lillestrøm)
13	GK	IRL	Sean McDermott (to (Norway) Start)
16	MF	NOR	Niklas Sandberg (on loan to (Norway) Sola)
23	DF	NOR	Erik Tønne (to (Norway) Bodø/Glimt)

=== Sogndal ===
In: Note: Flags indicate national team as defined under FIFA eligibility rules; some limited exceptions apply. Players may hold more than one non-FIFA nationality.

No.	Pos.	Nation	Player
6	MF	NOR	Peter Aase (from (Norway) Florø)
10	MF	NOR	Thomas Drage (from (Norway) Tromsø)
11	FW	NGA	Osita Henry Chikere (free agent)

Out: Note: Flags indicate national team as defined under FIFA eligibility rules; some limited exceptions apply. Players may hold more than one non-FIFA nationality.

No.	Pos.	Nation	Player
8	FW	NOR	Ulrik Flo (to (Norway) Odd)
10	FW	NIR	Robin Shroot (to (Norway) Hødd)
11	FW	NOR	Jim Johansen (loan return to (Norway) Bodø/Glimt)
12	GK	NOR	Christian Sukke (loan return to (Norway) Sarpsborg 08)

=== Strømmen ===
In: Note: Flags indicate national team as defined under FIFA eligibility rules; some limited exceptions apply. Players may hold more than one non-FIFA nationality.

No.	Pos.	Nation	Player
9	FW	NOR	Ulrik Berglann (on loan from (Norway) Bodø/Glimt)
19	FW	NOR	Emil Ekblom (on loan from (Norway) Stabæk)

Out: Note: Flags indicate national team as defined under FIFA eligibility rules; some limited exceptions apply. Players may hold more than one non-FIFA nationality.

No.	Pos.	Nation	Player

=== Åsane ===
In: Note: Flags indicate national team as defined under FIFA eligibility rules; some limited exceptions apply. Players may hold more than one non-FIFA nationality.

No.	Pos.	Nation	Player
8	DF	NOR	Jacob Glesnes (from (Norway) Fyllingsdalen)
17	FW	NOR	Thomas Aarsund (from (Norway) Brattvåg)
88	FW	NOR	Geir André Herrem (from (Norway) Fyllingsdalen)

Out: Note: Flags indicate national team as defined under FIFA eligibility rules; some limited exceptions apply. Players may hold more than one non-FIFA nationality.

No.	Pos.	Nation	Player
8	MF	NOR	Kjetil Kalve (on loan to (Norway) Fyllingsdalen)
11	MF	ESP	Damian Sánchez Olsen (retired)
17	DF	NOR	Sverre Bjørkkjær (loan return to (Norway) Haugesund)
18	MF	NOR	Erlend Grov (on loan to (Norway) Fyllingsdalen)
22	DF	NOR	Glenn Håberg (released)
23	FW	NOR	Joachim Forthun (to (Norway) Fana)
30	FW	NOR	Håkon Lorentzen (loan return to (Norway) Brann)
