= Neda Alaei =

Norwegian writer

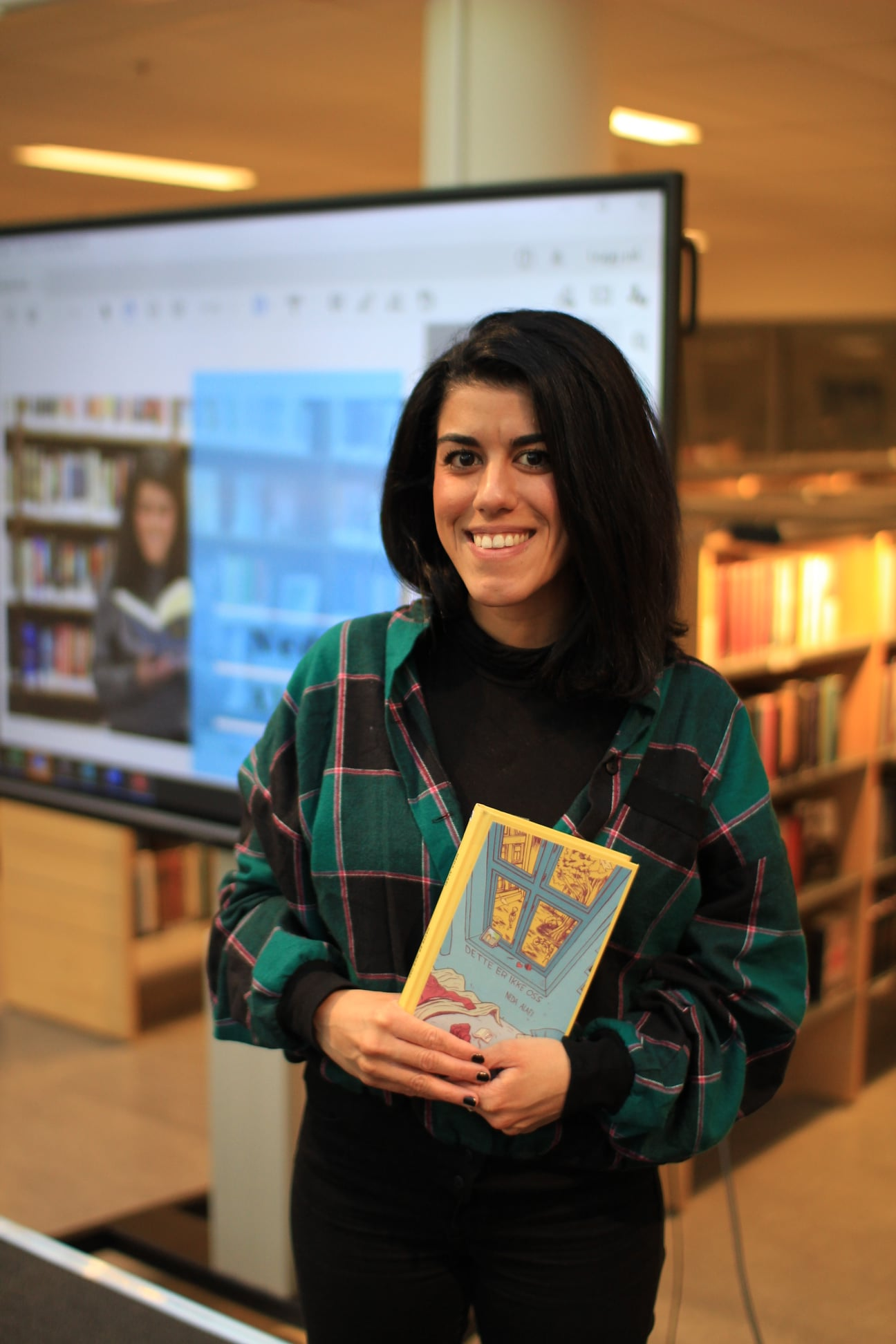
Alaei with her debut novel, 2019.

Neda Alaei (born 1991) is a Norwegian writer of young adult fiction.

Alaei hails from Moss, and utilized her professional background in the child protective services when writing for teenagers. Her debut novel was Dette er ikke oss (2019), which earned her the Uprisen award. She followed with Å fange luft (2021) and På én betingelse (2023), winning her second Uprisen the following year. All her books have been published by Gyldendal Norsk Forlag.

Awards
Preceded by Michael Stilson	Recipient of the Uprisen; 2020	Succeeded by Anne Gunn Halvorsen; Randi Fuglehaug
Preceded by Marte Mittet	Recipient of the Uprisen; 2024	Succeeded by
