= Kristoffer Ajer =

Norwegian footballer (born 1998)

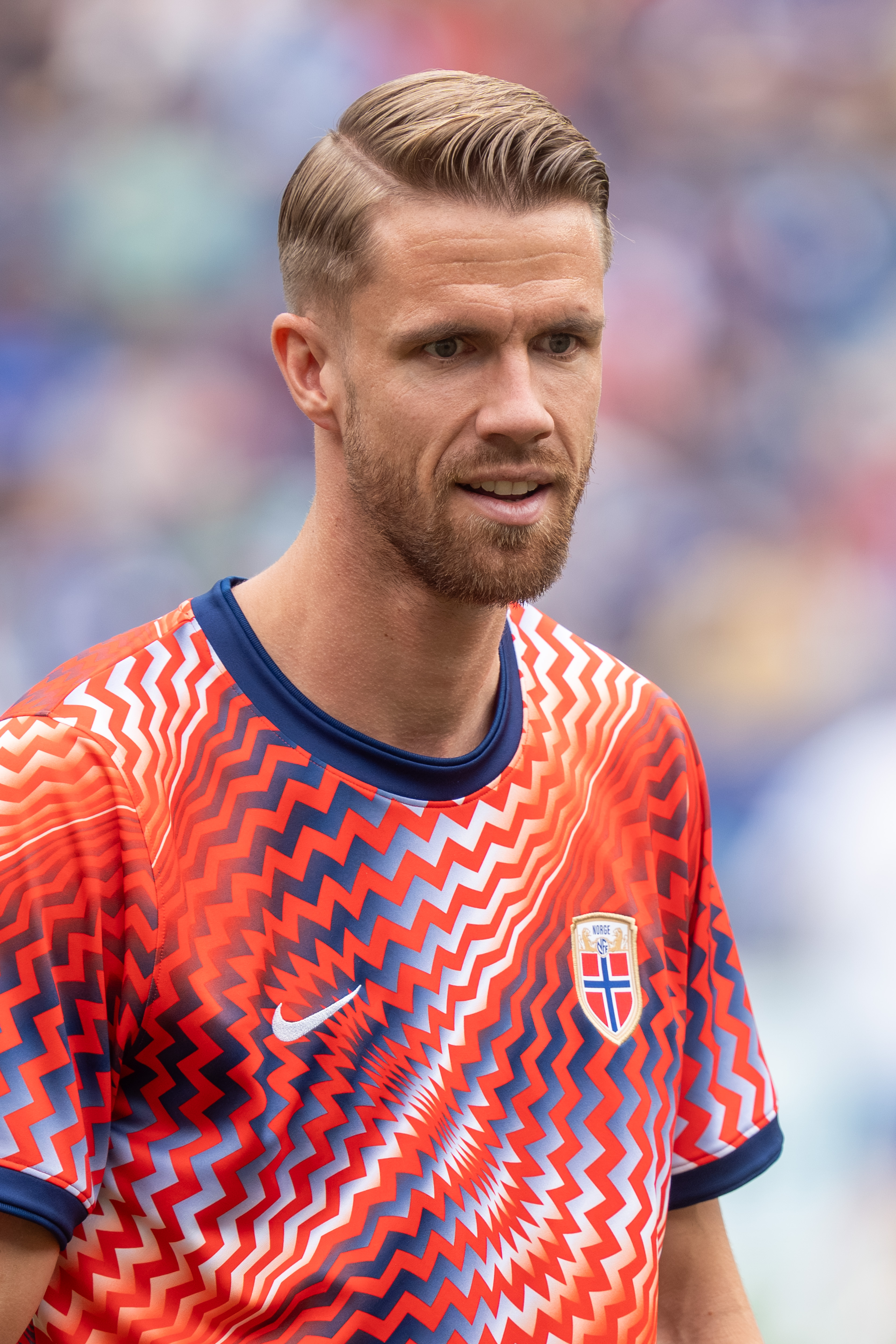
- Ajer with Norway in 2026

Personal information
- Full name: Kristoffer Vassbakk Köpp Ajer
- Date of birth: 17 April 1998 (age 28)
- Place of birth: Rælingen, Norway
- Height: 1.98 m (6 ft 6 in)
- Positions: Centre-back; right-back

Team information
- Current team: Brentford
- Number: 20

Youth career
- –2009: Rælingen
- 2010–2014: Lillestrøm

Senior career*
Years	Team	Apps	(Gls)
2013–2014	Lillestrøm II	8	(2)
2014–2016	Start	54	(9)
2016–2021	Celtic	115	(5)
2017	→ Kilmarnock (loan)	16	(0)
2021–	Brentford	118	(4)

International career^{‡}
2014	Norway U16	12	(1)
2015	Norway U17	2	(1)
2015	Norway U18	10	(6)
2016	Norway U19	6	(3)
2017–2018	Norway U21	5	(0)
2018–	Norway	63	(3)
- * Club domestic league appearances and goals as of 19:00, 10 October 2026 (UTC) ‡ National team caps and goals as of 17 November 2026

Kristoffer Vassbakk Köpp Ajer (born 17 April 1998) is a Norwegian professional footballer who plays either as centre-back or right-back for Premier League club Brentford and the Norway national team.

== Early and personal life ==
Kristoffer Vassbakk Ajer was born in Rælingen, Akershus County in Norway on 17 April 1998. In his younger years he participated in athletics, handball and ice hockey before ending up playing football.

As a youth player he originally started his footballing career at Rælingen FK before joining Lillestrøm SK when he was eleven years old. He was eventually picked up by IK Start in 2014, which marked the start of his professional footballing career as a result of his parents moving to the city of Kristiansand on the Southern coast of Norway.

While playing professionally for IK Start, he attended Kristiansand Katedralskole Gimle (High School) where he was known as a very conscientious and diligent student receiving a total of 18 straight A's. He attributed this to his strong competitive instinct and self-discipline, as well as the support from his teachers and parents and the fact that he values having a good education outside of his footballing career. Ajer originally planned enrolling at the Faculty of Medicine at the University of Oslo while simultaneously playing football professionally, but he has since put those plans on hold. On the reasons why he excelled as a footballer, he attributed this to his early physical development, strength and maturity:

I feel like I've been pretty lucky in my career. I was developing physically from a very early age: When I was six years old I was two heads taller than the rest of the players on the field. After a match where we won 30–0, I accounted for 26 goals. I remember I was refused to play the next matches of the tournament if I could not prove my age. After this, my mother always had my passport with her when I was playing football matches.

He is also a mentor/ambassador for the Equinor campaign for future athletes, entrepreneurs and talents in Norway called Morgendagens Helter ("Heroes of Tomorrow").

== Club career ==
=== Start ===
He made his professional debut for Start on 19 July 2014 in a 2–1 win against Bodø/Glimt.

At 16 years of age, Ajer captained Start in a 1–1 draw against Lillestrøm on 7 April 2015, becoming the youngest ever footballer to captain a team in the Tippeligaen. While playing for IK Start he played both as a central midfielder, but was gradually placed as a central defender.

=== Celtic ===
In early January 2016, Ajer had a one-week trial with Scottish club Celtic. On 17 February 2016, he signed a four-year contract with Celtic and joined the club in June 2016 for a fee which could rise up to £650,000. He was loaned to Kilmarnock in January 2017 and returned to his parent club to become a mainstay in central defence. On 14 May 2018, Ajer penned a new four-year deal with Celtic. On 30 August, Ajer scored his first goal for Celtic in a 3–0 win against FK Sūduva.

On 24 October 2019, Ajer made his 100th appearance in all competitions for Celtic's first team in a Europa League match against Lazio.

=== Brentford ===
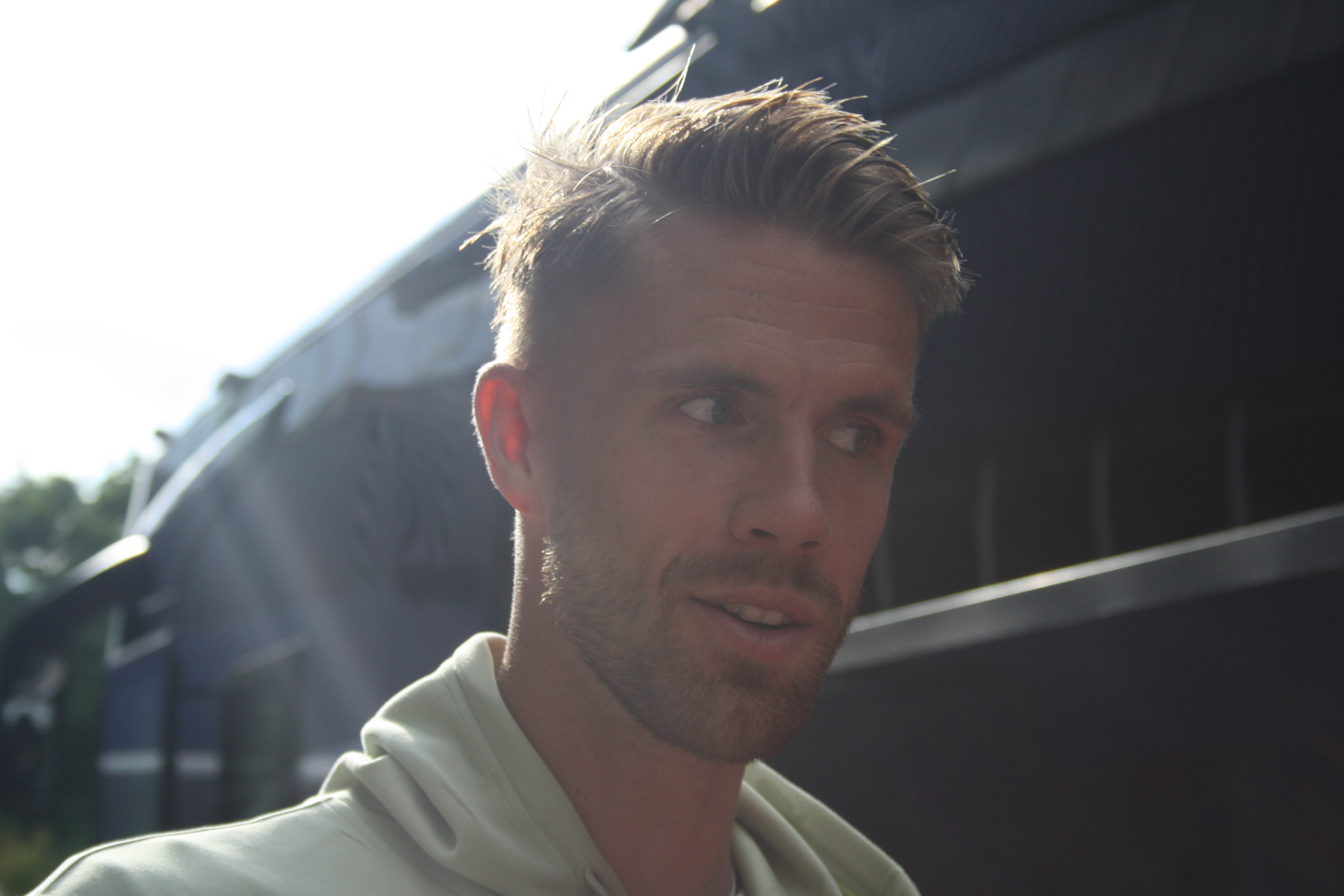
Ajer signing autographs after a Brentford match in 2025.

On 21 July 2021, Ajer completed a move to Premier League club Brentford on a five-year deal for an undisclosed fee. He made his Premier League debut on 13 August 2021 in a 2–0 win against Arsenal. He scored his first goal for Brentford against Southampton on 7 May 2022.

On 21 November 2023, Ajer signed a new deal with Brentford until the summer of 2028, with the club keeping an option to extend his contract for a further season. He scored his second goal against Burnley on 16 March 2024.

== International career ==
On 13 March 2018, Ajer received his first call-up to the Norwegian senior squad for friendly matches against Australia and Albania, debuting in the former match to honour his late grandfather.

On 21 May 2026, Ajer was included in the 26-man squad selected by Norway national team manager Ståle Solbakken for the 2026 FIFA World Cup. On 4 October that same year, Ajer scored a remarkable half-volley goal against Portugal during the UEFA Nations League A group stage.

== Career statistics ==
=== Club ===
As of match played 7 November 2026

Appearances and goals by club, season and competition
Club	Season	League			National cup (Note: Includes Norwegian Cup, Scottish Cup, FA Cup)		League cup (Note: Includes Scottish League Cup, EFL Cup)		Europe		Other		Total	
Club	Season	Division	Apps	Goals	Apps	Goals	Apps	Goals	Apps	Goals	Apps	Goals	Apps	Goals
Lillestrøm II	2013	3. divisjon Group 3	4	2	—		—		—		—		4	2
Lillestrøm II	2014	3. divisjon Group 3	4	0	—		—		—		—		4	0
Lillestrøm II	Total		8	2	—		—		—		—		8	2
Start	2014	Tippeligaen	13	1	0	0	—		—		—		13	1
Start	2015	Tippeligaen	30	8	2	4	—		—		2 (Note: Appearances in Tippeligaen relegation play-offs)	0	34	12
Start	2016	Tippeligaen	11	0	3	1	—		—		—		14	1
Start	Total		54	9	5	5	—		—		2	0	61	14
Celtic	2016–17	Scottish Premiership	0	0	—		0	0	1 (Note: Appearance in UEFA Champions League)	0	—		1	0
Celtic	2017–18	Scottish Premiership	24	0	5	0	1	0	4 (Note: Two appearances in UEFA Champions League, two appearances in UEFA Europa League)	0	—		34	0
Celtic	2018–19	Scottish Premiership	28	0	4	0	3	0	10 (Note: Five appearances in UEFA Champions League, five appearances and one goal in UEFA Europa League)	1	—		45	1
Celtic	2019–20	Scottish Premiership	28	3	3	0	4	0	15 (Note: Five appearances and one goal in UEFA Champions League, ten appearances and in UEFA Europa League)	1	—		50	4
Celtic	2020–21	Scottish Premiership	35	2	1	0	2	0	8 (Note: One appearance in UEFA Champions League, seven appearances in UEFA Europa League)	0	—		46	1
Celtic	Total		115	5	13	0	10	0	38	2	—		176	6
Kilmarnock (loan)	2016–17	Scottish Premiership	16	0	1	0	—		—		—		17	0
Brentford	2021–22	Premier League	24	1	2	0	2	0	—		—		28	1
Brentford	2022–23	Premier League	9	0	1	0	0	0	—		—		10	0
Brentford	2023–24	Premier League	28	2	1	0	2	0	—		—		31	2
Brentford	2024–25	Premier League	24	0	0	0	1	0	—		—		25	0
Brentford	2025–26	Premier League	27	0	1	0	3	0	—		—		31	0
Brentford	2026–27	Premier League	10	1	0	0	2	0	—		—		12	1
Brentford	Total		122	4	5	0	10	0	—		—		137	4
Career total			315	19	24	5	22	0	38	2	2	0	401	25

=== International ===
As of match played 17 November 2026

Appearances and goals by national team and year
National team	Year	Apps	Goals
Norway	2018	6	0
Norway	2019	8	0
Norway	2020	5	0
Norway	2021	6	0
Norway	2022	2	0
Norway	2023	6	1
Norway	2024	6	0
Norway	2025	9	1
Norway	2026	15	1
Total		63	3

Scores and results list Norway's goal tally first.

List of international goals scored by Kristoffer Ajer
No.	Date	Venue	Opponent	Score	Result	Competition
1.	7 September 2023	Ullevaal Stadion, Oslo, Norway	Jordan	2–0	6–0	Friendly
2.	25 March 2025	Nagyerdei Stadion, Debrecen, Hungary	Israel	3–1	4–2	2026 FIFA World Cup qualification
3.	4 October 2026	Estádio do Dragão, Porto, Portugal	Portugal	1–0	1–2	2026–27 UEFA Nations League A

== Honours ==
Celtic

- Scottish Premiership: 2017–18, 2018–19, 2019–20
- Scottish Cup: 2017–18, 2018–19, 2019–20
- Scottish League Cup: 2017–18, 2018–19, 2019–20

Brentford B

- Premier League Cup: 2022–23

Individual

- PFA Scotland Team of the Year: 2018–19 Scottish Premiership, 2020–21 Scottish Premiership
