= Andreas Hollingen =

Norwegian footballer (born 1994)

Personal information
- Date of birth: 3 October 1994 (age 32)
- Place of birth: Molde, Norway
- Height: 1.79 m (5 ft 10 1/2 in)
- Position: Attacking midfielder

Team information
- Current team: KFUM Oslo (physical coach)

Youth career
- Ekko/Aureosen
- Molde

Senior career*
Years	Team	Apps	(Gls)
2012–2015	Molde	1	(0)
2014	→ HamKam (loan)	10	(2)
2015	→ Start (loan)	19	(1)
2016–2018	Start	15	(0)

Managerial career
- 2019–2020: Frigg Oslo (youth coach)
- 2020–: KFUM Oslo (physical coach)
- * Club domestic league appearances and goals

Andreas Hollingen (born 3 October 1994) is a retired Norwegian footballer who played as a midfielder.

== Career ==
Hollingen made his first-team debut for Molde in October 2012 in the Europa League against Steaua București. He later made his Norwegian Premier League debut in July 2013 in a 3–2 win against Tromsø.

On 10 August 2014, Hollingen joined HamKam on loan for the remainder of the season.

On 26 March 2015, Hollingen joined IK Start on a season-long loan. The loan was made permanent from the 2016-season. He left the club at the end of the 2018 season.

Hollingen fought with injuries in four years and never played professionally again since leaving IK Start at the age of 24 in December 2018.

=== Later career ===
From August 2019 to February 2020, he worked as a youth coach at Frigg Oslo FK. Later in 2020, Hollingen was hired as a physical coach for KFUM Oslo's Norwegian First Division team.

== Career statistics ==
As of match played 6 November 2016

Appearances and goals by club, season and competition
Club	Season	League			National Cup		Continental		Other		Total	
Club	Season	Division	Apps	Goals	Apps	Goals	Apps	Goals	Apps	Goals	Apps	Goals
Molde	2012	Tippeligaen	0	0	0	0	1	0	-		2	0
Molde	2013	Tippeligaen	1	0	1	0	0	0	-		2	0
Molde	2014	Tippeligaen	0	0	2	1	0	0	-		2	1
Molde	2015	Tippeligaen	0	0	0	0	0	0	-		0	0
Molde	Total		1	0	3	1	1	0	0	0	5	1
HamKam (loan)	2014	Norwegian First Division	10	2	0	0	-		-		10	2
Start (loan)	2015	Tippeligaen	19	1	1	0	-		2	1	22	2
Start	2016	Tippeligaen	15	0	0	0	-		-		15	0
Start	Total		34	1	1	0	0	2	1	0	37	2
Career total			45	3	4	1	1	0	2	1	52	5
