= Michael Stilson =

Norwegian footballer

Personal information
- Full name: Michael Christopher Stilson
- Date of birth: 4 July 1989 (age 37)
- Place of birth: Trondheim, Norway
- Height: 1.76 m (5 ft 9 in)
- Position: Midfielder

Youth career
- Strindheim

Senior career*
Years	Team	Apps	(Gls)
2011–2014	Ranheim	81	(7)
2014	Lokomotiv Oslo	5	(0)
2015–2016	Mjøndalen	16	(1)
2015	→ Ranheim (loan)	13	(0)
- * Club domestic league appearances and goals

Michael Christopher Stilson (born 4 July 1987) is a Norwegian footballer and novelist.

== Personal life ==
Stilson was born in Trondheim. His father being American and his mother Norwegian, he had three older sisters.

== Football career ==
Stilson made his debut for Mjøndalen in 2015. After not playing many games for Mjøndalen in 2015 he was loaned out to his former club Ranheim for the rest of the season.

=== Career statistics ===
As of 9 December 2016

Season	Club	Division	League		Cup		Total	
Season	Club	Division	Apps	Goals	Apps	Goals	Apps	Goals
2011	Ranheim	Adeccoligaen	26	0	3	0	29	0
2012	Ranheim	Adeccoligaen	27	6	0	0	27	6
2013	Ranheim	Adeccoligaen	27	1	4	2	31	2
2014	Ranheim	Adeccoligaen	1	0	0	0	1	0
2015	Mjøndalen	Tippeligaen	5	0	3	0	8	0
2015	Ranheim	1. divisjon	13	0	0	0	13	0
2016	Mjøndalen	1. divisjon	11	1	1	1	12	2
Career Total			110	8	11	3	121	11

== Literary career ==
Stilson made his literary debut with Bare spille ball (2018), followed by Alene gjennom (2020) and Kampfikseren (2023). These are football-themed young adult fiction books. His debut earned him the award Uprisen.

Awards
Preceded by Thomas Enger	Recipient of the Uprisen; 2019	Succeeded by Neda Alaei
