= Tapio Heikkilä =

Finnish footballer (born 1990)

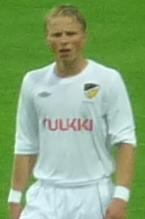
- Tapio Heikkilä in 2011

Personal information
- Date of birth: 8 April 1990 (age 36)
- Place of birth: Espoo, Finland
- Height: 1.87 m (6 ft 1 1/2 in)
- Position: Centre back

Youth career
- EPS
- Honka

Senior career*
Years	Team	Apps	(Gls)
2008–2012	Honka	71	(6)
2013–2016	HJK	86	(6)
2015–2016	SJK	0	(0)
2016–2018	Start	55	(4)
2018–2019	Sandnes Ulf	47	(6)
2020–2021	Honka	27	(1)

International career^{‡}
- Finland U-17
- Finland U-18
- Finland U-19
	Finland U-21	5	(0)
	Finland	4	(0)
Medal record
Honka
Runner-up	Finnish Cup	2008
Runner-up	Veikkausliiga	2008
Runner-up	Veikkausliiga	2009
Winner	Finnish League Cup	2010
Winner	Finnish League Cup	2011
Winner	Finnish Cup	2012
- * Club domestic league appearances and goals as of 31 October 2021 ‡ National team caps and goals as of 23 September 2015

Tapio Heikkilä (born 8 April 1990) is a Finnish football player.

== Career ==
=== Club ===
In December 2015, Heikkilä signed a two-year contract with SJK. Little over a month later, 1 February 2016, and after only one appearance for SJK in the League Cup, Heikkilä moved to Norwegian Tippeligaen side IK Start.

== Honours ==
=== Club ===
FC Honka

- Veikkausliiga Runners-up (2): 2008, 2009
- Finnish Cup: 2012
- Finnish League Cup (2): 2010, 2011

== Career statistics ==
As of 31 December 2021

Club	Season	League			Cup		League Cup		Europe		Total	
Club	Season	Division	Apps	Goals	Apps	Goals	Apps	Goals	Apps	Goals	Apps	Goals
Honka	2008	Veikkausliiga	2	0	1	0	1	0	0	0	4	0
Honka	2009	Veikkausliiga	0	0	0	0	1	0	0	0	1	0
Honka	2010	Veikkausliiga	6	0	0	0	0	0	1	0	7	0
Honka	2011	Veikkausliiga	30	5	0	0	0	0	4	0	34	5
Honka	2012	Veikkausliiga	33	1	5	0	4	0	–		42	1
Honka	Total		71	6	6	0	6	0	5	0	88	6
HJK	2013	Veikkausliiga	31	1	1	0	3	0	2	0	37	1
HJK	2014	Veikkausliiga	27	3	3	0	5	0	3	0	38	3
HJK	2015	Veikkausliiga	27	2	3	0	6	0	5	0	51	2
HJK	Total		85	6	7	0	14	0	10	0	116	6
Start	2016	Tippeligaen	30	2	2	0	–		–		32	2
Start	2017	1. divisjon	25	2	2	0	–		–		27	2
Start	Total		55	4	4	0	0	0	0	0	59	4
Sandnes Ulf	2018	1. divisjon	27	3	3	0	–		–		30	3
Sandnes Ulf	2019	1. divisjon	20	3	3	0	–		–		23	3
Sandnes Ulf	Total		47	6	6	0	0	0	0	0	53	6
Honka	2020	Veikkausliiga	15	1	3	0	–		0	0	18	1
Honka	2021	Veikkausliiga	12	0	5	0	–		1	0	18	0
Honka	Total		27	1	8	0	0	0	1	0	36	1
Career total			285	23	31	0	20	0	16	0	352	23
