= Austin Ikenna =

Nigerian footballer

Personal information
- Full name: Austin Ikenna Uzoremeke
- Date of birth: 15 August 1993 (age 33)
- Place of birth: Nigeria
- Height: 1.80 m (5 ft 11 in)
- Position: Forward

Youth career
- Rivers United

Senior career*
Years	Team	Apps	(Gls)
–2013	CA Bizertin		
2014–2015	Leopards		
2015–2017	IK Start	8	(0)
2020	FC Wels	2	(0)
- * Club domestic league appearances and goals as of 17:47, 15 February 2021 (UTC)

Austin Ikenna Uzoremeke (born 15 August 1993) is a Nigerian footballer who plays as a forward.

== Career ==
After terminating his contract with Tunisian side CA Bizertin, Ikenna signed for Kenyan side A.F.C. Leopards on a two-year contract in January 2014. Ikenna went on trial with Aalesunds FK in July 2015, after being recommended to the club by André Schei Lindbæk, but failed to secure a deal. In August of the same year, Ikenna signed for IK Start until 2017.

In February 2017, Ikenna's contract with IK Start was terminated by mutual consent.

== Career statistics ==
=== Club ===
As of match played 24 July 2016

Appearances and goals by club, season and competition
Club	Season	League			National Cup		Continental		Other		Total	
Club	Season	Division	Apps	Goals	Apps	Goals	Apps	Goals	Apps	Goals	Apps	Goals
Start	2015	Tippeligaen	5	0	0	0	-		1	0	6	0
Start	2016	Tippeligaen	3	0	2	0	-		-		5	0
Start	Total		8	0	2	0	-	-	1	0	11	0
Career total			8	0	2	0	-	-	1	0	11	0
