= Alex DeJohn =

American soccer player

Personal information
- Full name: Alexander Ray DeJohn
- Date of birth: May 10, 1991 (age 35)
- Place of birth: Marlboro, New Jersey, United States
- Height: 6 ft 0 in (1.83 m)
- Position: Defender

Youth career
- Players Development Academy

College career
Years	Team	Apps	(Gls)
2009–2012	Old Dominion Monarchs	66	(2)

Senior career*
Years	Team	Apps	(Gls)
2011	Central Jersey Spartans	11	(0)
2013	Ekenäs IF	26	(2)
2014	TPS	28	(1)
2015–2016	Start	41	(1)
2017–2018	Dalkurd	38	(2)
2019–2020	Orlando City	12	(0)
2021	Pittsburgh Riverhounds	0	(0)
2021–2022	Atlanta United	9	(0)
2021–2022	Atlanta United 2	6	(0)
- * Club domestic league appearances and goals as of June 11, 2024

Alexander Ray DeJohn (born May 10, 1991) is an American former professional soccer player who played as a defender. Born in Marlboro, New Jersey, DeJohn played college soccer for the Old Dominion Monarchs before being drafted in the 2013 MLS Supplemental Draft by the New England Revolution as the 42nd pick (80th overall). Despite being drafted, DeJohn moved to Finland and joined Ekenäs IF before moving to Veikkausliiga club TPS.

DeJohn spent two seasons in Finland before moving to Norway with Start. He then moved to Sweden and signed with Dalkurd. In 2019, DeJohn moved back to the United States and signed with Orlando City where he played two seasons.

== Early life and college ==
Born in Marlboro, New Jersey, DeJohn began his career with the Players Development Academy, where he played with the PDA Cruyff side. In 2009, DeJohn entered Old Dominion University where he played college soccer for the Old Dominion Monarchs. He played with the Monarchs for four years, playing 66 games and scoring 2 goals. Following the 2012 season, DeJohn was named into the second team CAA All-Conference squad.

== Career ==
While playing college soccer for the Old Dominion Monarchs, DeJohn spent the summer of 2011 playing with the Central Jersey Spartans of the Premier Development League.

=== Ekenäs IF and TPS ===
On January 22, 2013, DeJohn was selected by the New England Revolution with the 42nd pick in the MLS Supplemental Draft (80th overall in the MLS SuperDraft). Later in 2013, DeJohn moved to Finland and joined Kakkonen (third division) club Ekenäs IF. He made his debut for the club on April 28, 2013, against Gnistan, starting in the 4–1 defeat. He scored his first goal for the club on May 25 against LPS, finding the net in the 3–0 victory.

Following his first season in Finland, DeJohn signed with Veikkausliiga (first division) club TPS. He made his debut for TPS on January 24, 2014, against Inter Turku, starting in a 3–2 defeat. He scored his goal for the club on February 19 against Mariehamn, scoring the opener in a 2–2 draw.

=== Start and Dalkurd ===
Following his two seasons in Finland, DeJohn moved to Norway and signed with Eliteserien club Start. He made his club debut on April 7, 2015, against Lillestrøm, starting as the match ended in a 1–1 draw.

DeJohn stayed with Start for two seasons before moving to Sweden and signing with Superettan club Dalkurd. His debut for Dalkurd was on March 5, 2017, against AIK. He started as the match ended in a 0–0 draw. During the 2017 season, DeJohn helped Dalkurd finish in second place and earn promotion to the Allsvenskan. DeJohn scored his first goals in the Swedish top tier on August 27, 2018, against Hammarby, a brace during a 3–2 defeat.

=== Orlando City ===
On January 10, 2019, DeJohn returned to the United States and joined Major League Soccer club Orlando City. He made his debut on March 2 against New York City FC, starting in the 2–2 draw. Following his first season with Orlando, DeJohn had his contract option declined before re-signing with the club on November 27, 2019.

On December 2, 2020, following the 2020 season, DeJohn had his contract declined again and was thus released.

=== Atlanta United ===
On February 9, 2021, DeJohn joined USL Championship club Pittsburgh Riverhounds. However, a month later, on March 12, DeJohn signed with Major League Soccer side Atlanta United. According to Riverhounds head coach Bob Lilley, the club had an agreement with DeJohn that he could terminate his contract if he receives and accepts an opportunity with a club in Major League Soccer. On May 1, 2021, DeJohn appeared for Atlanta United 2, the club's reserve affiliate in the USL Championship, against OKC Energy. He then made his debut for Atlanta United on May 9, 2021, in a 1–1 draw against Inter Miami, coming on as a 73rd-minute substitute. DeJohn's contract option was declined by Atlanta following the 2022 season.

== Career statistics ==
As of June 11, 2024

Appearances and goals by club, season and competition
Club	Season	League			Cup		Continental		Total	
Club	Season	Division	Apps	Goals	Apps	Goals	Apps	Goals	Apps	Goals
Central Jersey Spartans	2011	Premier Development League	11	0	—		—		11	0
Ekenäs IF	2013	Kakkonen	26	1	—		—		26	1
TPS	2014	Veikkausliiga	28	1	4	1	—		32	2
Start	2015	Tippeligaen	22	0	2	1	—		24	1
Start	2016	Tippeligaen	19	1	1	0	—		20	1
Start	Total		41	1	3	1	0	0	44	2
Dalkurd	2017	Superettan	20	0	1	0	—		21	0
Dalkurd	2018	Allsvenskan	18	2	5	1	—		23	3
Dalkurd	Total		38	2	6	1	0	0	44	3
Orlando City	2019	MLS	6	0	3	0	—		9	0
Orlando City	2020	MLS	6	0	—		—		6	0
Orlando City	Total		12	0	3	0	0	0	15	0
Atlanta United	2021	MLS	4	0	—		—		4	0
Atlanta United	2022	MLS	5	0	2	0	—		5	0
Atlanta United	Total		9	0	2	0	0	0	11	0
Atlanta United 2	2021	USL Championship	3	0	—		—		3	0
Atlanta United 2	2022	USL Championship	3	0	—		—		3	0
Atlanta United 2	Total		6	0	0	0	0	0	6	0
Career total			171	5	18	3	0	0	189	8
