= Lasse Sigurdsen =

Norwegian footballer (born 1997)

Personal information
- Full name: Lasse Sigurdsen
- Date of birth: 1 June 1997 (age 29)
- Place of birth: Kristiansand, Norway
- Height: 1.80 m (5 ft 11 in)
- Position: Forward

Team information
- Current team: KFUM Oslo
- Number: 30

Youth career
- Fløy
- 2015–2016: Start

Senior career*
Years	Team	Apps	(Gls)
2012–2014	Fløy		
2016–2018	Start	20	(1)
2018	→ Fløy (loan)	23	(1)
2018–2020	Fløy	30	(17)
2020–	KFUM Oslo	11	(3)
- * Club domestic league appearances and goals as of 22 December 2020

Lasse Sigurdsen (born 1 June 1997) is a Norwegian football striker who plays for 1. divisjon side KFUM Oslo.

He started his career in Fløy, and played for the senior team before joining IK Start. He then made his Tippeligaen debut in March 2016 as a last-minute substitute against Lillestrøm. In 2018 he returned to Fløy on loan.

== Career statistics ==
As of match played 9 June 2018

Club	Season	Division	League		Cup		Total	
Club	Season	Division	Apps	Goals	Apps	Goals	Apps	Goals
2016	Start	Tippeligaen	16	1	2	2	18	3
2017	Start	OBOS-ligaen	4	0	0	0	4	0
2018	Fløy	PostNord-ligaen	9	0	1	0	10	0
Career Total			29	1	3	2	32	3
