= Jon Hodnemyr =

Norwegian footballer (born 1995)

Personal information
- Date of birth: 4 December 1995 (age 30)
- Height: 1.78 m (5 ft 10 in)
- Position: Defender

Team information
- Current team: Vindbjart

Youth career
- –2010: Vindbjart

Senior career*
Years	Team	Apps	(Gls)
2010–2013	Vindbjart		
2014–2015	Start	13	(0)
2016–	Vindbjart	0	(0)
- * Club domestic league appearances and goals as of 12 January 2016

Jon Hodnemyr (born 4 December 1995) is a Norwegian football defender who currently plays for Vindbjart.

== Career ==
He started his career in Vindbjart FK, and made his senior debut in 2010, only 14 years and 287 days of age. Ahead of the 2014 season he joined IK Start. He made his league debut in November 2014 against Vålerenga, playing the whole match.
