= Emil Dahle =

Norwegian footballer (born 1990)

Personal information
- Date of birth: 30 October 1990 (age 36)
- Place of birth: Molde, Norway
- Position: Midfielder

Team information
- Current team: Brattvåg
- Number: 10

Youth career
- Åndalsnes
- –2010: Molde

Senior career*
Years	Team	Apps	(Gls)
2011–2013	HamKam	84	(19)
2014–2016	Stabæk	4	(0)
2015	→ Start (loan)	12	(0)
2015	→ Bryne (loan)	14	(0)
2016	HamKam	25	(6)
2017–	Brattvåg	235	(19)
- * Club domestic league appearances and goals as of 15 November 2026

Emil Dahle (born 30 October 1990) is a Norwegian football midfielder who currently plays for 2. divisjon side Brattvåg.

He hails from Mittet in Rauma Municipality and played youth football for Åndalsnes and Molde. He made his debut for HamKam in the 2011 Adeccoligaen. Before the 2014 season he moved to Stabæk. He made his league debut for Stabæk in the win against Sogndal in March 2014.

In March 2015 he signed a loan deal with Start to 20 July 2015. Then, on 24 July 2015, he went on loan to Bryne for the rest of the season. Ahead of the 2016 season he returned to HamKam. One year later he returned to his home county and Brattvåg IL.

== Career statistics ==
Club	Season	Division	League		Cup		Total	
Club	Season	Division	Apps	Goals	Apps	Goals	Apps	Goals
2011	HamKam	1. divisjon	28	7	2	0	30	7
2012	HamKam	1. divisjon	27	3	3	1	30	4
2013	HamKam	1. divisjon	29	9	4	3	33	12
2014	Stabæk	Tippeligaen	4	0	2	1	6	1
2015	Start	Tippeligaen	12	0	2	0	14	0
2015	Bryne	1. divisjon	14	0	0	0	14	0
Career Total			114	19	13	5	127	24
