= Erlend Segberg =

Norwegian footballer (born 1997)

Personal information
- Date of birth: 12 April 1997 (age 29)
- Position: Midfielder

Team information
- Current team: Start
- Number: 23

Senior career*
Years	Team	Apps	(Gls)
2013–2014	Vigør	28	(9)
2015–2020	Start	101	(4)
2021–2023	Aalesund	71	(7)
2024	Fredrikstad	9	(0)
2024	Kristiansund	15	(0)
2025–2026	Trapani	8	(0)
2026–	Start	16	(1)

International career
2015	Norway U18	8	(0)
- * Club domestic league appearances and goals as of 22 August 2026

Erlend Segberg (born 12 April 1997) is a Norwegian professional footballer who plays as a midfielder for Norwegian Eliteserien club Start.

== Career ==
In January 2026 he signed for Start.

== Career statistics ==
As of match played 8 August 2026

Appearances and goals by club, season and competition
Club	Season	League			National Cup		Other		Total	
Club	Season	Division	Apps	Goals	Apps	Goals	Apps	Goals	Apps	Goals
Start	2015	Eliteserien	10	0	0	0	–		10	0
Start	2016	Eliteserien	10	1	1	1	–		11	2
Start	2017	1. divisjon	23	1	2	0	–		25	1
Start	2018	Eliteserien	16	0	1	0	–		17	0
Start	2019	1. divisjon	24	0	1	0	–		25	0
Start	2020	Eliteserien	18	2	0	0	–		18	2
Start	Total		101	4	5	1	0	0	106	5
Aalesund	2021	1. divisjon	30	5	2	1	–		32	6
Aalesund	2022	Eliteserien	15	0	0	0	–		15	0
Aalesund	2023	Eliteserien	7	0	0	0	–		7	0
Aalesund	Total		52	5	2	1	0	0	54	6
Fredrikstad	2024	Eliteserien	9	0	3	1	–		12	1
Kristiansund	2024	Eliteserien	15	0	0	0	–		15	0
Trapani	2024–25	Serie C	8	0	0	0	–		8	0
Start	2026	Eliteserien	16	2	0	0	–		16	2
Career total			201	11	10	3	0	0	211	14
