= Robert Sandnes =

Norwegian footballer (born 1991)

Personal information
- Full name: Robert Johann Sandnes
- Date of birth: 29 December 1991 (age 34)
- Place of birth: Ålesund, Norway
- Height: 1.77 m (5 ft 10 in)
- Position: Defender

Youth career
- –2007: Skarbøvik
- 2008–2010: Aalesund

Senior career*
Years	Team	Apps	(Gls)
2011–2012	Aalesund	0	(0)
2012	Selfoss	19	(0)
2013	Stjarnan	17	(2)
2014–2016	Start	57	(2)
2017	KR	15	(0)
2018–2019	Aalesund	13	(1)
- * Club domestic league appearances and goals as of 18 August 2018

Robert Sandnes (born 29 December 1991) is a retired Norwegian football defender who last played for Aalesund.

He also played for three Icelandic clubs as well as Start from 2014 to 2016.

== Career statistics ==
As of 18 August 2018

Season	Club	Division	League		Cup		Total	
Season	Club	Division	Apps	Goals	Apps	Goals	Apps	Goals
2011	Aalesund	Tippeligaen	0	0	2	0	2	0
2012	Selfoss	Úrvalsdeild	19	0	2	0	21	0
2013	Stjarnan	Úrvalsdeild	17	2	4	0	21	2
2014	Start	Tippeligaen	15	0	2	0	17	0
2015	Start	Tippeligaen	20	0	2	0	22	0
2016	Start	Tippeligaen	22	2	2	2	24	4
2017	KR	Úrvalsdeild	15	0	0	0	15	0
2018	Aalesund	1. divisjon	13	1	1	0	14	1
2019	Aalesund	1. divisjon	0	0	0	0	0	0
Career Total			121	5	15	2	136	7
