= Michael Christensen (footballer) =

Danish footballer (born 1983)

Personal information
- Full name: Michael Larsen Christensen
- Date of birth: 6 February 1983 (age 43)
- Place of birth: Denmark
- Height: 1.84 m (6 ft 1/2 in)
- Position: Defender

Senior career*
Years	Team	Apps	(Gls)
2003–2006	OB	28	(0)
2007–2012	SønderjyskE	62	(0)
2012–2015	FC Vestsjælland	61	(2)
2015–2016	Start	27	(0)
2016	Hobro IK	11	(0)
- * Club domestic league appearances and goals as of 11 January 2016

Michael Christensen (born 6 February 1983) is a Danish professional football defender, who last played for Superliga side Hobro IK.
