= Espen Børufsen =

Norwegian footballer (born 1988)

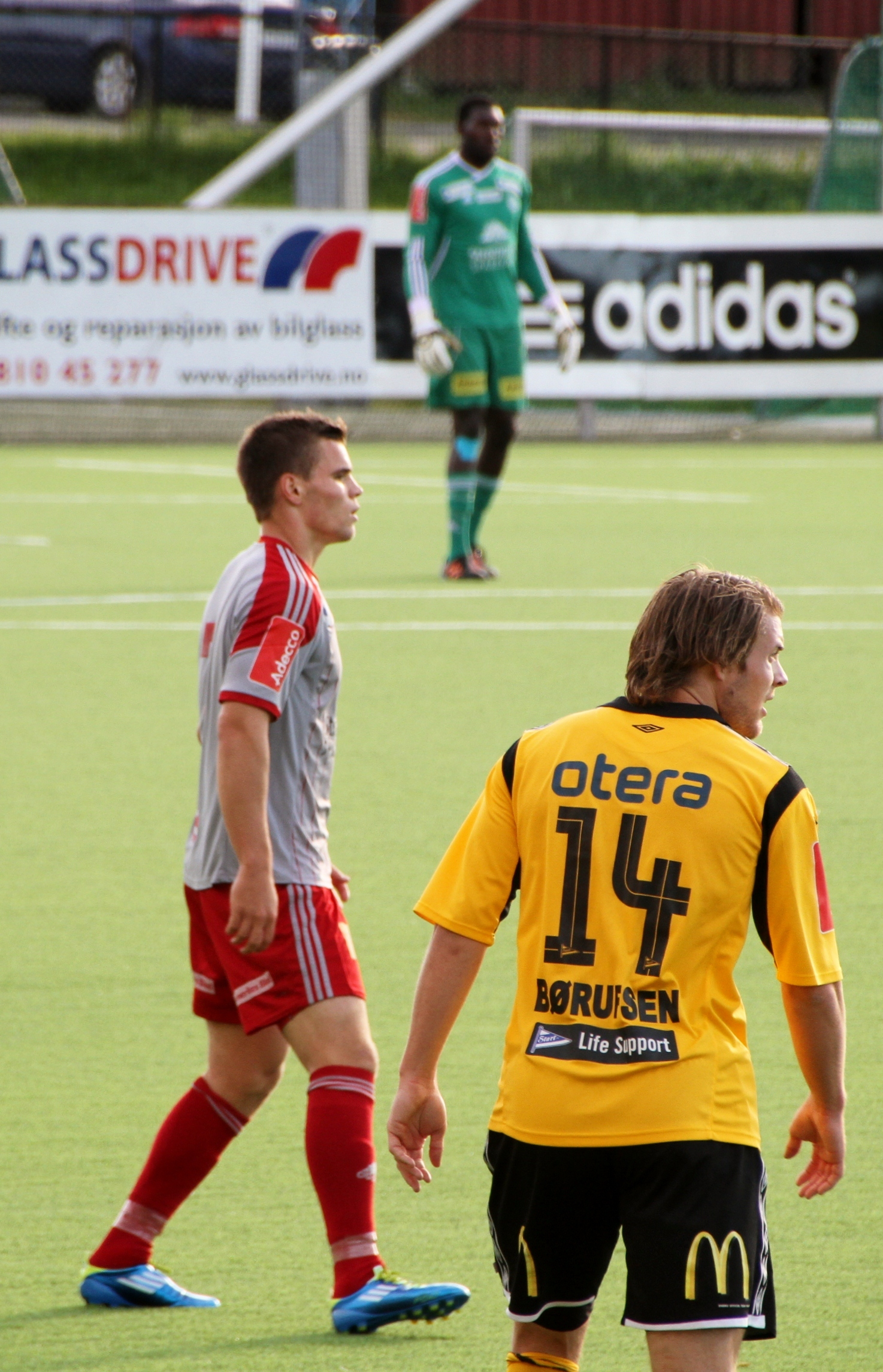

Personal information
- Full name: Espen Fjone Børufsen
- Date of birth: 4 March 1988 (age 38)
- Place of birth: Kristiansand, Norway
- Height: 1.79 m (5 ft 10 in)
- Position: Left midfielder

Youth career
- Våg
- 2005–2006: Start

Senior career*
| Years | Team | Apps | (Gls) |
| 2006–2020 | Start | 302 | (43) |

International career
| 2004 | Norway U16 | 3 | (1) |
| 2006 | Norway U18 | 7 | (0) |
| 2007 | Norway U19 | 5 | (0) |
| 2007–2010 | Norway U21 | 11 | (0) |
| 2013 | Norway U23 | 1 | (0) |
- * Club domestic league appearances and goals

Espen Børufsen (born 4 March 1988) is a Norwegian former footballer who played as a midfielder. He spent his entire professional career with Start.

He was extensively capped as a youth international, most for U21. As a youth player Børufsen played for FK Våg. He joined Start in the 2005 season. He retired after the 2020 season.

== Career statistics ==
Appearances and goals by club, season and competition
| Club | Season | League | | | Cup | | Other | | Total | |
| Club | Season | Division | Apps | Goals | Apps | Goals | Apps | Goals | Apps | Goals |
|---|---|---|---|---|---|---|---|---|---|---|
| Start | 2006 | Eliteserien | 3 | 0 | 0 | 0 | - | | 3 | 0 |
| Start | 2007 | Eliteserien | 21 | 5 | 3 | 0 | - | | 24 | 5 |
| Start | 2008 | 1. divisjon | 17 | 1 | 0 | 0 | - | | 17 | 1 |
| Start | 2009 | Eliteserien | 30 | 2 | 3 | 1 | - | | 33 | 3 |
| Start | 2010 | Eliteserien | 27 | 9 | 4 | 0 | - | | 31 | 9 |
| Start | 2011 | Eliteserien | 26 | 3 | 5 | 1 | - | | 31 | 4 |
| Start | 2012 | 1. divisjon | 19 | 2 | 1 | 0 | - | | 20 | 2 |
| Start | 2013 | Eliteserien | 29 | 0 | 3 | 0 | - | | 32 | 0 |
| Start | 2014 | Eliteserien | 23 | 3 | 3 | 0 | - | | 26 | 3 |
| Start | 2015 | Eliteserien | 25 | 6 | 0 | 0 | 2 | 1 | 27 | 7 |
| Start | 2016 | Eliteserien | 26 | 3 | 1 | 0 | - | | 27 | 3 |
| Start | 2017 | 1. divisjon | 29 | 7 | 2 | 0 | - | | 31 | 7 |
| Start | 2018 | Eliteserien | 9 | 2 | 1 | 1 | - | | 10 | 3 |
| Start | 2019 | 1. divisjon | 0 | 0 | 0 | 0 | - | | 0 | 0 |
| Start | 2020 | Eliteserien | 18 | 0 | 0 | 0 | - | | 18 | 0 |
| Start | Total | | 302 | 43 | 25 | 3 | 2 | 1 | 329 | 47 |
| Career Total | | | 302 | 43 | 25 | 3 | 2 | 1 | 329 | 47 |
