= Espen Hoff =

Norwegian footballer (born 1981)

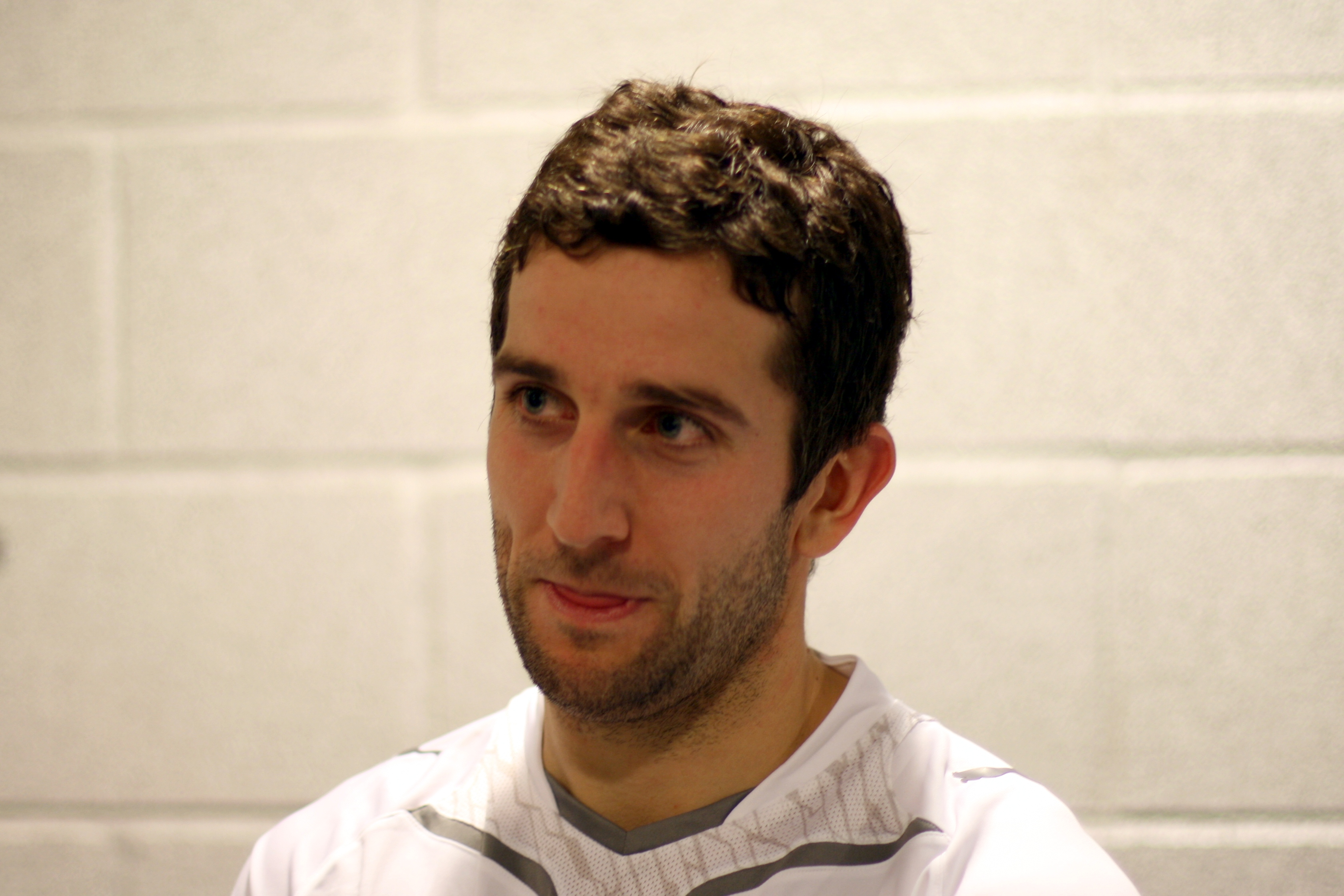

Personal information
- Date of birth: 20 November 1981 (age 44)
- Place of birth: Larvik, Norway
- Height: 1.73 m (5 ft 8 in)
- Position: Winger

Youth career
- Sporty
- Larvik Turn

Senior career*
Years	Team	Apps	(Gls)
1999–2005	Odd Grenland	154	(38)
2006–2008	Lyn	67	(22)
2009–2010	Stabæk	46	(6)
2010–2016	Start	160	(36)
Total		427	(102)

International career
2005–2006	Norway	2	(0)
- * Club domestic league appearances and goals

Espen Hoff (born 20 November 1981) is a retired Norwegian professional footballer, born in Larvik. He is primarily a winger, but may also play as an attacking midfielder, whilst at Lyn he occasionally featured on the left wing. With 406 top division appearances, Hoff has made the sixth-highest number of appearances in Eliteserien.

== Club career ==
Espen Hoff was signed from Odd Grenland before the start of the 2006 season in Norway. As a junior, he played for Larvik Turn, before moving to Skien and Odd Grenland in 1999.

At Odd Grenland, he scored 37 goals in 155 league matches, and additional 20 goals in 30 Norwegian Cup games. He also appeared in 6 European Cup games, without netting. He won the Norwegian Cup with Odd Grenland in 2000.

He signed for Tippeligaen Champions Stabæk in 2008 and from 2009 onwards he was a Stabæk player. He joined Start in 2010.

== International career ==
Espen Hoff has been capped twice for his national side, making his début in a friendly against Bahrain on 25 January 2005. He was capped 27 times for the Norwegian U-21 team, scoring 3 goals.

== Career statistics ==
Season	Club	Division	League		Cup		Total	
Season	Club	Division	Apps	Goals	Apps	Goals	Apps	Goals
1999	Odd Grenland	Tippeligaen	7	1	0	0	7	1
2000	Odd Grenland	Tippeligaen	23	7	5	3	28	10
2001	Odd Grenland	Tippeligaen	25	8	5	2	30	10
2002	Odd Grenland	Tippeligaen	25	6	7	4	32	10
2003	Odd Grenland	Tippeligaen	24	8	3	1	27	9
2004	Odd Grenland	Tippeligaen	26	5	2	2	28	7
2005	Odd Grenland	Tippeligaen	24	2	4	7	28	9
2006	Lyn	Tippeligaen	21	6	1	2	22	8
2007	Lyn	Tippeligaen	23	6	3	2	26	8
2008	Lyn	Tippeligaen	23	10	5	5	28	15
2009	Stabæk	Tippeligaen	28	1	4	0	32	1
2010	Stabæk	Tippeligaen	18	5	3	4	21	9
2010	Start	Tippeligaen	11	2	1	1	12	3
2011	Start	Tippeligaen	29	11	5	3	34	14
2012	Start	Adeccoligaen	21	7	3	1	24	8
2013	Start	Tippeligaen	29	6	3	1	32	7
2014	Start	Tippeligaen	28	6	2	1	30	7
2015	Start	Tippeligaen	26	3	1	1	27	4
2016	Start	Tippeligaen	16	1	0	0	16	1
Career Total			427	102	57	40	484	142

== Honours ==
Odd Grenland

- Norwegian Cup: 2000
