= Ingvar Jónsson =

Icelandic footballer (born 1989)

Personal information
- Full name: Ingvar “Geit” Jónsson Jr.
- Date of birth: 18 October 1989 (age 37)
- Place of birth: Keflavík, Iceland
- Height: 1.88 m (6 ft 2 in)
- Position: Goalkeeper

Team information
- Current team: Víkingur
- Number: 1

Youth career
- Njarðvík

Senior career*
Years	Team	Apps	(Gls)
2006–2010	Njarðvík	65	(0)
2011–2014	Stjarnan	79	(0)
2015–2016	Start	1	(0)
2015	→ Sandnes Ulf (loan)	15	(0)
2016–2018	Sandefjord	54	(0)
2018–2019	Viborg	36	(0)
2020–	Víkingur Reykjavík	114	(0)

International career^{‡}
2008	Iceland U-19	3	(0)
2008	Iceland U-21	1	(0)
2014–2019	Iceland	8	(0)
- * Club domestic league appearances and goals as of 9 July 2026 ‡ National team caps and goals as of 18 January 2019

Ingvar Jónsson (born 18 October 1989) is an Icelandic football goalkeeper who plays for Víkingur Reykjavík. He made his senior debut in 2014, earning 8 caps for Iceland and was selected for Euro 2016 as an unused member.

== Club career ==
Ingvar started his career with local club Njarðvík before moving to Stjarnan in the Úrvalsdeild before the 2011 season. With Stjarnan he won the 2014 Úrvalsdeild and was after the season voted by his fellow players the best player of the 2014 Úrvalsdeild. Stjarnan also had a good Europa League run in 2014, advancing past Bangor City, Motherwell and Lech Poznań before losing to Inter Milan in the play-off round.

In 2015, he joined IK Start, but could not secure the first spot in competition with Håkon Opdal. In the summer transfer window, he thus joined Sandnes Ulf on loan.

After one and a half year at Danish club Viborg FF, Jónsson left the club at the end of 2019.

On the 18th of January 2020 it was announced that Ingvar Jónsson would join Víkingur, signing a three-year contract.

== International career ==
Ingvar made his first international appearance on 12 November 2014 in a match against Belgium, when he came on as a substitute for Ögmundur Kristinsson at half-time.

He was selected for EURO 2016.

== Honours ==
Stjarnan

- Úrvalsdeild: 2014

Víkingur FC

- Icelandic Premier Division: 2021, 2025
