= Henrik Breimyr =

Norwegian footballer (born 1993)

Personal information
- Full name: Henrik Malde Breimyr
- Date of birth: 20 July 1993 (age 33)
- Place of birth: Stavanger, Norway
- Height: 1.87 m (6 ft 2 in)
- Position: Central midfielder

Team information
- Current team: Egersund
- Number: 4

Youth career
- 2007–2009: Reading
- 2009–2011: Aldershot Town

Senior career*
Years	Team	Apps	(Gls)
2011–2012	Aldershot Town	0	(0)
2011	→ Eastleigh (loan)	9	(1)
2012	→ Viking (loan)	2	(0)
2012	→ Bryne (loan)	13	(2)
2013–2015	Bryne	81	(4)
2015–2016	Start	15	(0)
2016	Sandnes Ulf	3	(1)
2017–2018	Hødd	58	(4)
2019	Tromsdalen	24	(1)
2020–	Egersund	1	(0)

International career
2011–2013	Norway U18	4	(0)
- * Club domestic league appearances and goals as of 6 October 2019

Henrik Malde Breimyr (born 20 July 1993) is a Norwegian footballer, playing for Egersund. Breimyr plays as a central defender.

== Club career ==
Henrik played schoolboy football for Fulham and Reading. He was released by Reading in the summer of 2009 and joined Aldershot Town's academy. He has also played for the club's reserves.

After impressive appearances for Aldershot's youth and reserve teams, Henrik was given a trial by Chelsea's academy in February 2011, playing against the academy sides of Portsmouth, Birmingham and Milton Keynes Dons.

Breimyr was runner-up in the 2011 League Two Apprentice of the Year, and signed a professional contract with Aldershot in April 2011 that tied him to the club until 2013.

In February 2012, Breimyr joined the Norwegian side Viking on a one-year-long loan deal. He made his debut in Tippeligaen against Haugesund on 28 April 2012, when he replaced Christian Landu Landu as a substitute in the 55th minute. Breimyr spent most of the first half of the season playing at Viking's reserve team in the Third Division, and the loan-deal was terminated on 3 August 2012 by mutual consent. Instead Breimyr was loaned out to First Division side Bryne on 22 August 2012.

Breimyr left IL Hødd at the end of the 2018 season.

== International career ==
Towards the end of the 2011–12 season, Breimyr was called up to the Norway under-18 squad for the Slovakia Cup. He played in all four of Norway's games, including the loss to Denmark under-18s in the final of the tournament. From there on he has been a regular in the national team squad and currently has a total of seven under-18 caps and four under-19 caps. He made his debut for the under-21 side on 6 February 2013 against Turkey.

== Career statistics ==
As of 14 July 2020

Season	Club	Division	League		Cup		Total	
Season	Club	Division	Apps	Goals	Apps	Goals	Apps	Goals
2012	Viking	Tippeligaen	1	0	2	0	3	0
2012	Bryne	Adeccoligaen	13	2	0	0	13	2
2013	Bryne	Adeccoligaen	29	1	3	0	32	1
2014	Bryne	1. divisjon	27	1	1	0	28	1
2015	Bryne	OBOS-ligaen	15	2	3	0	18	2
2015	Start	Tippeligaen	12	0	0	0	12	0
2016	Start	Tippeligaen	0	0	1	0	1	0
2016	Sandnes Ulf	OBOS-ligaen	3	1	0	0	3	1
2017	Hødd	PostNord-ligaen	26	0	2	0	28	0
2018	Hødd	PostNord-ligaen	14	3	4	0	18	3
2019	Tromsdalen	OBOS-ligaen	24	1	2	0	26	1
2020	Egersund	PostNord-ligaen	1	0	0	0	1	0
Career Total			165	11	18	0	183	11
