= Jørgen Hammer =

Norwegian footballer (born 1991)

Personal information
- Full name: Jørgen Paulov Hammer
- Date of birth: 2 April 1991 (age 35)
- Place of birth: Sandvika, Norway
- Height: 1.90 m (6 ft 3 in)
- Position: Defender

Team information
- Current team: KFUM Oslo
- Number: 33

Youth career
- Hosle
- Bærum
- –2010: Stabæk

Senior career*
Years	Team	Apps	(Gls)
2010–2015	Stabæk	84	(4)
2015	Start	10	(1)
2016–	KFUM Oslo	93	(6)
- * Club domestic league appearances and goals as of 22 December 2020

Jørgen Paulov Hammer (born 2 April 1991) is a Norwegian association football player who currently plays for KFUM Oslo.

== Career ==
He spent his youth career in Hosle IL and Bærum SK before joining Stabæk Fotball at junior level. He signed a professional contract in August 2010, lasting throughout the year. Already two days later he made his first-team debut, at home against Lillestrøm SK.

In August 2015, Hammer moved from Stabæk to IK Start.

== Career statistics ==
=== Club ===
As of match played 23 October 2016

Season	Club	Division	League		Cup		Total	
Season	Club	Division	Apps	Goals	Apps	Goals	Apps	Goals
2010	Stabæk	Tippeligaen	7	1	1	0	8	1
2011	Stabæk	Tippeligaen	25	2	1	0	26	2
2012	Stabæk	Tippeligaen	25	1	1	0	26	1
2013	Stabæk	Adeccoligaen	24	0	2	0	26	0
2014	Stabæk	Tippeligaen	2	0	0	0	2	0
2015	Stabæk	Tippeligaen	1	0	1	0	2	0
2015	IK Start	Tippeligaen	10	1	0	0	10	1
2016	KFUM Oslo	OBOS-ligaen	8	0	0	0	8	0
Career Total			102	5	6	0	108	5
