= Daniel Aase =

Norwegian footballer (born 1989)

Personal information
- Date of birth: 22 June 1989 (age 37)
- Place of birth: Kristiansand, Norway
- Height: 1.81 m (5 ft 11 1/2 in)
- Position: Attacking midfielder

Youth career
- Start

Senior career*
| Years | Team | Apps | (Gls) |
| 2005–2007 | → Start 2 | | |
| 2008–2015 | Vindbjart | 76 | (16) |
| 2015 | → Start (loan) | 10 | (1) |
| 2016–2018 | Start | 38 | (4) |
| 2018–2020 | Jerv | 66 | (6) |

International career
| 2011 | Norway futsal | 1 | (0) |
- * Club domestic league appearances and goals as of 15 December 2020

Daniel Aase (born 22 June 1989) is a retired Norwegian footballer who played as a midfielder.

== Career ==
Aase played for Start 2 between 2005 and 2007, joining Vindbjart ahead of the 2008 season. After several good seasons in the 2. divisjon, he was loaned to Start in 2015. He made his Tippeligaen debut in July 2015 against Viking. A permanent move followed, staying until he was shipped to FK Jerv in the summer of 2018. After 68 league and cup matches and seven goals, he retired after the 2020 season.

=== Career statistics ===
As of match played 24 October 2020

Appearances and goals by club, season and competition
| Club | Season | League | | | National Cup | | Continental | | Other | | Total | |
| Club | Season | Division | Apps | Goals | Apps | Goals | Apps | Goals | Apps | Goals | Apps | Goals |
|---|---|---|---|---|---|---|---|---|---|---|---|---|
| Start | 2015 | Tippeligaen | 10 | 1 | 0 | 0 | – | | – | | 10 | 1 |
| Start | 2016 | Tippeligaen | 10 | 0 | 1 | 0 | – | | – | | 11 | 0 |
| Start | 2017 | 1. divisjon | 28 | 4 | 1 | 2 | – | | – | | 29 | 6 |
| Start | 2018 | Eliteserien | 0 | 0 | 0 | 0 | – | | – | | 0 | 0 |
| Jerv | 2018 | 1. divisjon | 15 | 2 | 0 | 0 | – | | – | | 15 | 2 |
| Jerv | 2019 | 1. divisjon | 27 | 2 | 2 | 1 | – | | – | | 29 | 3 |
| Jerv | 2020 | 1. divisjon | 14 | 2 | 0 | 0 | – | | – | | 14 | 2 |
| Career total | | | 104 | 11 | 4 | 3 | 0 | 0 | 0 | 0 | 108 | 14 |
