= 2016 Stabæk Fotball season =

Stabæk
2016 season
- Chairman: Espen Moe
- Manager: Billy McKinlay (until 8 July 2016); Antoni Ordinas (from 8 July 2016)
- Stadium: Nadderud Stadion
- Tippeligaen: 14th
- Norwegian Cup: Fourth round vs Strømsgodset
- UEFA Europa League: First qualifying round vs Connah's Quay Nomads
- Top goalscorer: League: Five Players (4); All: Ohi Omoijuanfo (9)
Home colours	Away colours

The 2016 season was Stabæk's third consecutive season in the Tippeligaen following their relegation in 2012. It marked their 20th season in the top flight of Norwegian football. Stabæk had finished the previous season in third place, qualifying for the 2016–17 UEFA Europa League First qualifying round.

== Season events ==
Billy McKinlay resigned as manager on 8 July 2016, after being knocked out of the UEFA Europa League by Connah's Quay Nomads.

== Squad ==
As of 25 August 2016

Note: Flags indicate national team as defined under FIFA eligibility rules; some limited exceptions apply. Players may hold more than one non-FIFA nationality.

No.	Pos.	Nation	Player
1	GK	CIV	Sayouba Mandé
3	DF	NOR	Morten Skjønsberg
4	DF	SWE	Marcus Nilsson
7	FW	CRC	Mynor Escoe (loan from Saprissa)
8	MF	USA	Cole Grossman
9	MF	GEO	Giorgi Gorozia
10	FW	ALB	Agon Mehmeti
11	MF	NOR	Moussa Njie
12	GK	NOR	Christian Mørch
16	DF	NOR	Andreas Hanche-Olsen
18	DF	NOR	Jeppe Moe
20	MF	GHA	Kamal Issah
21	MF	NOR	Daniel Granli
22	GK	IND	Gurpreet Singh Sandhu

No.	Pos.	Nation	Player
23	MF	NOR	Emil Bohinen
24	GK	NOR	Simen Kjellevold
25	DF	NOR	Birger Meling
28	MF	CIV	Luc Kassi
30	FW	NOR	Markus Aanesland
32	MF	BRA	Alanzinho
40	MF	NOR	Marius Østvold
50	FW	NOR	Marcus Mehnert
60	MF	NOR	Edvard Race
77	FW	NOR	Muhamed Keita (loan from Lech Poznan)
90	DF	NOR	Jesper Espung
98	FW	NOR	Sebastian Pedersen
99	FW	NOR	Ohi Omoijuanfo

=== Out on loan ===
Note: Flags indicate national team as defined under FIFA eligibility rules; some limited exceptions apply. Players may hold more than one non-FIFA nationality.

No.	Pos.	Nation	Player
14	DF	NOR	Emil Ekblom (on loan at KFUM Oslo)

For season transfers, see List of Norwegian football transfers winter 2014–15 and List of Norwegian football transfers summer 2015.

== Transfers ==
=== Winter ===
In: Note: Flags indicate national team as defined under FIFA eligibility rules; some limited exceptions apply. Players may hold more than one non-FIFA nationality.

No.	Pos.	Nation	Player
10	FW	ALB	Agon Mehmeti (from (Sweden) Malmö)
11	MF	NOR	Moussa Njie (from (Norway) Bærum)
16	DF	NOR	Andreas Hanche-Olsen (from junior squad)
17	DF	SCO	Alex Davey (on loan from (England) Chelsea)
19	MF	GHA	Shadrach Eghan (loan from (Netherlands) Twente)
23	MF	NOR	Emil Bohinen (from junior squad)
99	FW	NOR	Ohi Omoijuanfo (from (Norway) Jerv)

Out: Note: Flags indicate national team as defined under FIFA eligibility rules; some limited exceptions apply. Players may hold more than one non-FIFA nationality.

No.	Pos.	Nation	Player
6	MF	GHA	Anthony Annan (released)
6	MF	NOR	Emil Dahle (to (Norway) HamKam, previously on loan at (Norway) Bryne)
11	MF	BEL	Yassine El Ghanassy (to (Belgium) KV Oostende)
14	FW	NOR	Emil Ekblom (on loan to (Norway) KFUM Oslo)
15	DF	FIN	Ville Jalasto (to (Finland) HJK)
16	DF	DEN	Thor Lange (released, previously on loan at (Norway) Strømmen)
18	MF	NZL	Craig Henderson (released, previously on loan at (Norway) Mjøndalen)
77	FW	NOR	Muhamed Keita (loan return to (Poland) Lech Poznan)

=== Summer ===
In: Note: Flags indicate national team as defined under FIFA eligibility rules; some limited exceptions apply. Players may hold more than one non-FIFA nationality.

No.	Pos.	Nation	Player
4	DF	SWE	Marcus Nilsson (from (England) Fleetwood Town)
7	FW	CRC	Mynor Escoe (on loan from (Costa Rica) Saprissa)
32	MF	BRA	Alanzinho (from (Turkey) Gaziantep B.B.)
77	FW	NOR	Muhamed Keita (on loan from (Poland) Lech Poznan, previously on loan at (Norway) Strømsgodset)

Out: Note: Flags indicate national team as defined under FIFA eligibility rules; some limited exceptions apply. Players may hold more than one non-FIFA nationality.

No.	Pos.	Nation	Player
4	DF	NOR	Nicolai Næss (to (United States) Columbus Crew)
7	FW	GHA	Ernest Asante (to (Denmark) Nordsjælland)
13	MF	NOR	Eirik Haugstad (to (Norway) Jerv)
17	DF	SCO	Alex Davey (loan return to (England) Chelsea)
19	MF	GHA	Shadrach Eghan (loan return to (Netherlands) Twente)
—	MF	NOR	Cornelius Bencsik (to (Norway) Asker)

== Friendlies ==
22 January 2016	Stabæk	3–0	Follo	Oslo, Norway
13:00 CET (UTC+1)	Paulo 52'; Omoijuanfo 59', 66'	Summary		Stadium: Vallhall Arena

31 January 2016	Stabæk (Norway)	0–2	(Russia) Terek Grozny	Malta
20:00 CET (UTC+1)		Summary	Ivanov 15'; Mbengue 74'

3 February 2016	Viktoria Plzeň (Czech Republic)	2–0	(Norway) Stabæk	Malta
17:00 CET (UTC+1)	Ďuriš 62', 67'	Summary

5 February 2016	Stabæk (Norway)	0–2	(Poland) Legia Warsaw	Marbella, Spain
16:10 CET (UTC+1)		Summary	Nikolić 42'; Hämäläinen 72'

14 February 2016	IFK Göteborg (Sweden)	2–0	(Norway) Stabæk	Gothenburg, Sweden
15:00 CET (UTC+1)	Rieks 12'; Hysén 35'	Summary		Stadium: Prioritet Serneke Arena; Attendance: 2,018; Referee: Bojan Pandzic (Sweden)

20 February 2016	Stabæk	1–2	Vålerenga	Nadderud, Norway
14:05 CET (UTC+1)	Omoijuanfo 64'	Summary	Ómarsson 43', 61'	Stadium: Nadderud Stadion; Attendance: 11,404

23 February 2016	Stabæk (Norway)	1–2	(Russia) Amkar Perm	Nadderud, Norway
16:00 CET (UTC+1)	D. Cornelius 64'	Summary	Peev 50'; Anene 59'	Stadium: Nadderud Stadion

27 February 2016	Rostov (Russia)	2–0	(Norway) Stabæk	Marbella, Spain
16:00 CET (UTC+1)	Ezatolahi 35'; Bastos 62'	Summary

6 March 2016	Mjøndalen	1–0	Stabæk	Mjøndalen, Norway
18:05 CET (UTC+1)	Pellegrino 75'	Summary	Issah (yellow card) 35'; Skjønsberg (yellow card) 40'	Stadium: Isachsen Stadion

== Competitions ==
=== Tippeligaen ===
==== Results summary ====
Overall								Home						Away					
Pld	W	D	L	GF	GA	GD	Pts	W	D	L	GF	GA	GD	W	D	L	GF	GA	GD
30	8	7	15	35	42	−7	31	5	1	9	15	18	−3	3	6	6	20	24	−4

Last updated: 7 November 2016.
Source: see below

==== Results by round ====
Round	1	2	3	4	5	6	7	8	9	10	11	12	13	14	15	16	17	18	19	20	21	22	23	24	25	26	27	28	29	30
Ground	A	H	A	H	A	H	A	H	A	H	A	H	A	H	A	H	A	A	H	A	H	A	H	A	H	H	A	H	A	H
Result	L	L	L	W	D	L	L	L	L	W	L	L	W	L	W	D	D	D	L	D	W	D	L	W	W	L	D	L	L	W
Position	14	15	15	13	12	13	15	15	15	15	15	15	15	15	13	13	14	14	15	15	14	14	15	14	13	14	15	15	15	14

Updated to match(es) played on 7 November 2016. Source: see below
A = Away; H = Home; W = Win; D = Draw; L = Loss

==== Results ====
11 March 2016 1	Aalesund	1–0	Stabæk	Ålesund
19:00 CET (UTC+1)	Larsen 47'	Summary	Issah (yellow card) 71'	Stadium: Color Line Stadion; Attendance: 5,941; Referee: Tore Hansen

20 March 2016 2	Stabæk	1–2	Molde	Bærum
20:00 CET (UTC+1)	Meling 27'	Summary	Elyounoussi 66', 75'; Aursnes (yellow card) 83'; Svendsen (yellow card) 90+3'	Stadium: Nadderud Stadion; Attendance: 3,289; Referee: Svein Oddvar Moen

3 April 2016 3	Bodø/Glimt	3–1	Stabæk	Bodø
18:00 CEST (UTC+2)	Azemi 32'; Jevtović 64'; Bjørnbak 72'	Summary	Davey (yellow card) 40'; Skjønsberg (yellow card) 71'; Omoijuanfo 86'	Stadium: Aspmyra Stadion; Attendance: 2,980; Referee: Tommy Skjerven

9 April 2016 4	Stabæk	2–1	Vålerenga	Bærum
18:00 CEST (UTC+2)	Kassi 1'; Mehmeti (yellow card) 26'; Issah (yellow card) 80'; Gorozia 90'	Summary	Larsen (yellow card) 12'; Brown 68'; Zahid (yellow card) 89'	Stadium: Nadderud Stadion; Attendance: 4,151; Referee: Svein-Erik Edvartsen

17 April 2016 5	Sarpsborg 08	1–1	Stabæk	Sarpsborg
18:00 CEST (UTC+2)	Groven 44'; Lund Nielsen (yellow card) 62'; Glesnes (yellow card) 82'	Summary	Mehmeti 46', (yellow card) 82'	Stadium: Sarpsborg Stadion; Attendance: 3,296; Referee: Dag Vidar Hafsås

20 April 2016 6	Stabæk	0–1	Strømsgodset	Bærum
19:00 CEST (UTC+2)	Mandé (yellow card) 39'	Summary	Madsen (yellow card) 29'; Vilsvik 39' (pen.)	Stadium: Nadderud Stadion; Attendance: 3,807; Referee: Tom Harald Hagen

25 April 2016 7	Haugesund	3–1	Stabæk	Haugesund
19:00 CEST (UTC+2)	Haraldseid (yellow card) 3'; Miljeteig 40'; Tronstad 51'; Kiss 75'	Summary	Issah (yellow card) 5'; Kassi 72'	Stadium: Haugesund Stadion; Attendance: 4,438; Referee: Tommy Skjerven

1 May 2016 8	Stabæk	1–2	Odd	Bærum
20:00 CEST (UTC+2)	Mehmeti 2'; Meling (yellow card) 78'	Summary	Nordkvelle 5'; Bentley 41'; Jensen (yellow card) 60'; Samuelsen (yellow card) 69'	Stadium: Nadderud Stadion; Attendance: 3,301; Referee: Ken Henry Johansen

8 May 2016 9	Rosenborg	3–1	Stabæk	Trondheim
18:00 CEST (UTC+2)	Midtsjø 45', 50'; Gytkjær 53'; Jensen (yellow card) 85'	Summary	Mehmeti (yellow card) 53'; Meling (yellow card) 84'; Kassi 87'; Issah (yellow card) 90'	Stadium: Lerkendal Stadion; Attendance: 17,133; Referee: Trond Ivar Døvle

12 May 2016 10	Stabæk	1–0	Viking	Bærum
18:00 CEST (UTC+2)	Asante 77'	Summary		Stadium: Nadderud Stadion; Attendance: 3,289; Referee: Tore Hansen

16 May 2016 11	Brann	1–0	Stabæk	Bergen
18:00 CEST (UTC+2)	Nilsen 47'	Summary	Meling (yellow card) 83'	Stadium: Brann Stadion; Attendance: 17,686; Referee: Svein Oddvar Moen

21 May 2016 12	Stabæk	0–3	Tromsø	Bærum
15:30 CEST (UTC+2)	Kassi (yellow card) 56'	Summary	Gjesdal 7'; Olsen 25'; Wangberg 49'; Moussa (yellow card) 89'	Stadium: Nadderud Stadion; Attendance: 3,289; Referee: Kim Andre Johnsen

29 May 2016 13	Start	0–5	Stabæk	Kristiansand
18:00 CEST (UTC+2)	Sandnes (yellow card) 90'	Summary	Omoijuanfo 33'; Issah (yellow card) 36'; Gorozia 41'; Moe (yellow card) 45'; Asante (yellow card) 66'; Njie 78', 89'; Meling 87'	Stadium: Sør Arena; Attendance: 7,273; Referee: Trond Ivar Døvle

3 July 2016 14	Stabæk	0–1	Sogndal	Bærum
18:00 CEST (UTC+2)	Eghan (yellow card) 90+3'	Summary	Kjemhus (yellow card) 56'; Otoo 73', (yellow card) 74'; Sarr (yellow card) 76'; Ramsland (yellow card) 86'	Stadium: Nadderud Stadion; Attendance: 3,052; Referee: Tom Harald Hagen

10 July 2016 15	Lillestrøm	1–2	Stabæk	Lillestrøm
18:00 CEST (UTC+2)	Kippe (yellow card) 57'; J. Kolstad 88'	Summary	Njie 37'; Meling (yellow card) 61'; Mehmeti 89'	Stadium: Åråsen Stadion; Attendance: 4,185; Referee: Kai-Erik Steen

17 July 2016 16	Stabæk	1–1	Brann	Bærum
18:00 CEST (UTC+2)	Issah (yellow card) 50', (goal) 72'; Kassi (yellow card) 85'	Summary	Karadas 67'	Stadium: Nadderud Stadion; Attendance: 3,894; Referee: Dag Vidar Hafsås

24 July 2016 17	Tromsø	2–2	Stabæk	Tromsø
18:00 CEST (UTC+2)	Michalsen (yellow card) 23'; Wangberg (yellow card) 44'; Antonsen 76'; Ødegaard (yellow card) 81'; Ingebrigtsen 88'	Summary	Issah (yellow card) 13'; Wangberg 36' (o.g.); Mehmeti 56'	Stadium: Alfheim Stadion; Attendance: 3,441; Referee: Trond Ivar Døvle

31 July 2016 18	Strømsgodset	2–2	Stabæk	Drammen
20:00 CEST (UTC+2)	Nana 2'; Pedersen 7'; Júnior (red card) 75'	Summary	Gorozia 5'; Vilsvik 30' (o.g.); Grossman (yellow card) 44'	Stadium: Marienlyst Stadion; Attendance: 6,179; Referee: Svein Oddvar Moen

7 August 2016 19	Stabæk	0–1	Haugesund	Bærum
15:30 CEST (UTC+2)	Kassi (yellow card) 90+2'	Summary	Agdestein 30'; Kiss (yellow card) 89'; Stølås (yellow card) 90+2'	Stadium: Nadderud Stadion; Attendance: 3,344; Referee: Kai-Erik Steen

14 August 2016 20	Viking	2–2	Stabæk	Stavanger
20:00 CEST (UTC+2)	Aasheim 50'; Pedersen 61'	Summary	Asante 30'; Meling (yellow card) 61' (goal) 71'; Skjønsberg (yellow card) 78'; Nilsson (yellow card) 85'	Stadium: Viking Stadion; Attendance: 7,269; Referee: KimAndre Johnsen

21 August 2016 21	Stabæk	3–0	Aalesund	Bærum
18:00 CEST (UTC+2)	Grossman 16'; Keita 30' (yellow card) 76'; Granli (yellow card) 66'; Kassi 86'	Summary	Carlsen (yellow card) 51'; Riise (yellow card) 81' (yellow-red card) 83'; Fet (yellow card) 86'	Stadium: Nadderud Stadion; Attendance: 4,938; Referee: Trond Ivar Døvle

28 August 2016 22	Sogndal	1–1	Stabæk	Sogndalsfjøra
15:30 CEST (UTC+2)	Ramsland 70'; Patronen (yellow card) 90'	Summary	Kassi (yellow card) 30'; Mehmeti (yellow card) 39'; Hanche-Olsen (yellow card) 50'; Meling 78'	Stadium: Fosshaugane Campus; Attendance: 3,004; Referee: Kai-Erik Steen

11 September 2016 23	Stabæk	0–2	Rosenborg	Bærum
18:00 CEST (UTC+2)	Nilsson (yellow card) 81'	Summary	Bakenga 85'; Jensen 90+1'	Stadium: Nadderud Stadion; Attendance: 4,938; Referee: Svein-Erik Edvartsen

18 September 2016 24	Odd	0–1	Stabæk	Skien
18:00 CEST (UTC+2)		Summary	Keita 58'; Escoe (yellow card) 80'	Stadium: Skagerak Arena; Attendance: 8,530; Referee: Tom Harald Hagen

26 September 2016 25	Stabæk	1–0	Bodø/Glimt	Bærum
19:00 CEST (UTC+2)	Meling (yellow card) 57'; Hanche-Olsen 62'; Mandé (yellow card) 90+1'; Gorozia (yellow card) 90+6'	Summary	Saltnes (yellow card) 15'; Jakobsen (yellow card) 34'	Stadium: Nadderud Stadion; Attendance: 3,643; Referee: Trond Ivar Døvle

1 October 2016 26	Stabæk	1–2	Lillestrøm	Bærum
15:30 CEST (UTC+2)	Hanche-Olsen (yellow card) 69'; Pedersen 90'	Summary	Skogseid (yellow card) 25'; Sinyan 35'; Origi (yellow card) 45+2'; Martin 51'; Innocent (yellow card) 68'	Stadium: Nadderud Stadion; Attendance: 4,252; Referee: Tore Hansen

16 October 2016 27	Vålerenga	1–1	Stabæk	Oslo
20:00 CEST (UTC+2)	Lekven (yellow card) 53'; Lindkvist 84'	Summary	Keita 3' (pen.)	Stadium: Ullevaal Stadion; Attendance: 7,088; Referee: Svein Oddvar Moen

22 October 2016 28	Stabæk	1–2	Sarpsborg 08	Bærum
15:30 CEST (UTC+2)	Njie 42'; Keita (yellow card) 56'	Summary	Sundli 84'; Mortensen 88'	Stadium: Nadderud Stadion; Attendance: 3,593; Referee: Tommy Skjerven

30 October 2016 29	Molde	3–0	Stabæk	Molde
18:00 CEST (UTC+2)	Gatt 10'; Flo (yellow card) 41'; Toivio 47'	Summary	Omoijuanfo (yellow card) 56'	Stadium: Aker Stadion; Attendance: 8,140; Referee: Tore Hansen

6 November 2016 30	Stabæk	3–0	Start	Bærum
18:00 CET (UTC+1)	Omoijuanfo 27', 32'; Keita (yellow card) 70'; Alanzinho 76'	Summary	Hollingen (yellow card) 13'; Salvesen (yellow card) 66'	Stadium: Nadderud Stadion; Attendance: 4,350; Referee: Svein-Erik Edvartsen

==== Table ====
Pos	Team	Pld	W	D	L	GF	GA	GD	Pts	Qualification or relegation
12	Lillestrøm	30	8	10	12	45	50	−5	34	
13	Tromsø	30	9	7	14	36	46	−10	34	
14	Stabæk (O)	30	8	7	15	35	42	−7	31	Qualification for the relegation play-offs
15	Bodø/Glimt (R)	30	8	6	16	36	45	−9	30	Relegation to First Division
16	Start (R)	30	2	10	18	23	59	−36	16	Relegation to First Division

Source: Football Association of Norway (in Norwegian), Soccerway
Rules for classification: 1) Points; 2) Goal difference; 3) Goals scored; 4) Head-to-head points; 5) Head-to-head goal difference; 6) Head-to-head away goals scored (between two teams).
(O) Play-off winners; (R) Relegated

==== Relegation play-offs ====
30 November 2016 First leg	Jerv	1–0	Stabæk	Grimstad
12:00 CET (UTC+1)	C.MacConnacher (yellow card) 27'; M.Ogungbaro 76'	Summary	Kassi (yellow card) 45+1'; Skjønsberg (yellow card) 74'	Stadium: Levermyr Stadion; Attendance: 1,750; Referee: Dag Roger Nebben

4 December 2016 Second leg	Stabæk	2–0 (2–1 agg.)	Jerv	Bærum
18:00 CET (UTC+1)	Hanche-Olsen (yellow card) 80'; Omoijuanfo 83', 85'	Summary	Berglann (yellow card) 29'; E.Knudsen (yellow card) 33'	Stadium: Nadderud Stadion; Attendance: 4,528; Referee: Svein Oddvar Moen

=== Norwegian Cup ===
13 April 2016 First Round	Korsvoll	1–4	Stabæk	Oslo
18:00 CEST (UTC+2)	A. Thun 24'; L. Alexandersen (yellow card) 72'; D. Lundström (yellow card) 75'	Summary	Kassi 41'; Mehmeti (yellow card) 71', (goal) 86'; Omoijuanfo 83'; Eghan 90'	Stadium: Korsvollbanen; Referee: Anders Hauglund

27 April 2016 Second Round	Sparta Sarpsborg	1–7	Stabæk	Sarpsborg
18:00 CEST (UTC+2)	A. Horvei 52' (pen.); S. Kosiah (yellow card) 74'; S. Shawali (yellow card) 85'; F. Andersen (yellow card) 86'	Summary	Gorozia 17'; Omoijuanfo 29', 59'; Moe 75'; Issah 80'; Njie 90+2', 90+2'	Stadium: Sarpsborg Stadion; Referee: Jørgen Haugen

4 May 2016 Third Round	Bærum	0–3	Stabæk	Bærum
18:00 CEST (UTC+2)	Iqbal (yellow card) 59'	Summary	Mehmeti 19', 51'; Meling 53', (yellow card) 54'	Stadium: Sandvika Stadion; Attendance: 1,000; Referee: Torkjell Jonsson Trædal

25 May 2016 Fourth Round	Strømsgodset	1–0	Stabæk	Drammen
18:00 CEST (UTC+2)	Pedersen 39'; Nguen (yellow card) 90'	Summary	Issah (yellow card) 38'; Skjønsberg (yellow card) 90'	Stadium: Marienlyst Stadion; Attendance: 3,801; Referee: Kai Erik Steen

=== UEFA Europa League ===
==== Qualifying rounds ====
30 June 2016 First qualifying round 1st leg	Connah's Quay Nomads (Wales)	0–0	(Norway) Stabæk	Rhyl (Note: Connah's Quay Nomads played their home match at Belle Vue, Rhyl, instead of their regular stadium Deeside Stadium, Connah's Quay.), Wales
20:15 CEST (UTC+2)	J. Disney (yellow card) 67'	Summary		Stadium: Belle Vue; Attendance: 573; Referee: Johnny Casanova (San Marino)

7 July 2016 First qualifying round 2nd leg	Stabæk (Norway)	0–1 (0–1 agg.)	(Wales) Connah's Quay Nomads	Fredrikstad (Note: Stabæk will play their home match at Fredrikstad Stadion, Fredrikstad, instead of their regular stadium Nadderud Stadion, Bærum.), Norway
19:00 CEST (UTC+2)	Issah (red card) 51'; Haugstad (yellow card) 87'	Summary	C. Morris 15'; J. Disney (yellow card) 24' (yellow-red card) 78'; Woolfe (yellow card) 41'; Danby (yellow card) 42'; M. Wilde (yellow card) 50'; I. Kearney (yellow card) 51'; J. Owen (yellow card) 60'	Stadium: Fredrikstad Stadion; Referee: Laurent Kopriwa (Luxembourg)

== Squad statistics ==
As of match played 4 December 2016

=== Appearances and goals ===
No.	Pos	Nat	Player	Total		Tippeligaen		Playoffs		Norwegian Cup		Europa League	
No.	Pos	Nat	Player	Apps	Goals	Apps	Goals	Apps	Goals	Apps	Goals	Apps	Goals
1	GK	(Ivory Coast) CIV	Sayouba Mandé	33	0	29	0	2	0	0	0	1+1	0
3	DF	(Norway) NOR	Morten Skjønsberg	36	0	30	0	2	0	2	0	2	0
4	DF	(Sweden) SWE	Marcus Nilsson	13	0	13	0	0	0	0	0	0	0
7	FW	(Costa Rica) CRC	Mynor Escoe	6	0	4+2	0	0	0	0	0	0	0
8	MF	(United States) USA	Cole Grossman	28	1	23	1	1	0	1+1	0	2	0
9	MF	(Georgia (country)) GEO	Giorgi Gorozia	29	4	14+9	3	0	0	3+1	1	2	0
10	FW	(Albania) ALB	Agon Mehmeti	29	7	17+7	4	0	0	3	3	0+2	0
11	MF	(Norway) NOR	Moussa Njie	36	5	22+6	3	2	0	3+1	2	2	0
13	MF	(Norway) NOR	Eirik Haugstad	11	0	0+9	0	0	0	0+1	0	0+1	0
16	DF	(Norway) NOR	Andreas Hanche-Olsen	15	1	11+2	1	2	0	0	0	0	0
18	DF	(Norway) NOR	Jeppe Moe	25	1	12+5	0	2	0	3+1	1	2	0
20	MF	(Ghana) GHA	Kamal Issah	23	1	17	0	0	0	4	1	2	0
21	DF	(Norway) NOR	Daniel Granli	20	0	13+3	0	2	0	1+1	0	0	0
22	GK	(India) IND	Gurpreet Singh Sandhu	6	0	1	0	0	0	4	0	1	0
25	DF	(Norway) NOR	Birger Meling	35	5	27+1	4	2	0	2+1	1	2	0
28	MF	(Ivory Coast) CIV	Luc Kassi	28	5	21+2	4	2	0	3	1	0	0
30	FW	(Norway) NOR	Markus Aanesland	1	0	0+1	0	0	0	0	0	0	0
32	MF	(Brazil) BRA	Alanzinho	10	1	5+3	1	1+1	0	0	0	0	0
40	MF	(Norway) NOR	Marius Østvold	2	0	0+1	0	0	0	0+1	0	0	0
50	FW	(Norway) NOR	Marcus Mehnert	2	0	1+1	0	0	0	0	0	0	0
60	DF	(Norway) NOR	Edvard Race	8	0	5+2	0	0	0	1	0	0	0
77	FW	(Norway) NOR	Muhamed Keita	11	3	9	3	2	0	0	0	0	0
98	FW	(Norway) NOR	Sebastian Pedersen	6	1	1+4	1	0+1	0	0	0	0	0
99	FW	(Norway) NOR	Ohi Omoijuanfo	36	9	15+13	4	2	2	4	3	2	0
Players away from Stabæk on loan:
Players who appeared for Stabæk no longer at the club:
4	DF	(Norway) NOR	Nicolai Næss	22	0	16	0	0	0	4	0	2	0
7	MF	(Ghana) GHA	Ernest Asante	26	2	20	2	0	0	3+1	0	2	0
17	DF	(Scotland) SCO	Alex Davey	7	0	4+1	0	0	0	2	0	0	0
19	MF	(Ghana) GHA	Shadrach Eghan	9	1	0+4	0	0	0	0+4	1	0+1	0

=== Goal scorers ===
Place	Position	Nation	Number	Name	Tippeligaen	Playoffs	Norwegian Cup	Europa League	Total
1	FW	(Norway)	99	Ohi Omoijuanfo	4	2	3	0	9
2	FW	(Albania)	10	Agon Mehmeti	4	0	3	0	7
2	MF	(Norway)	11	Moussa Njie	4	0	2	0	6
4	FW	(Ivory Coast)	28	Luc Kassi	4	0	1	0	5
4	DF	(Norway)	25	Birger Meling	4	0	1	0	5
6	MF	(Georgia (country))	9	Giorgi Gorozia	3	0	1	0	4
7	FW	(Norway)	77	Muhamed Keita	3	0	0	0	3
8	MF	(Ghana)	7	Ernest Asante	2	0	0	0	2
8	MF	(Ghana)	20	Kamal Issah	1	0	1	0	2
8				Own goal	2	0	0	0	2
11	MF	(United States)	8	Cole Grossman	1	0	0	0	1
11	DF	(Norway)	16	Andreas Hanche-Olsen	1	0	0	0	1
11	FW	(Norway)	98	Sebastian Pedersen	1	0	0	0	1
11	MF	(Brazil)	32	Alanzinho	1	0	0	0	1
11	MF	(Ghana)	19	Shadrach Eghan	0	0	1	0	1
11	DF	(Norway)	18	Jeppe Moe	0	0	1	0	1
				Total	35	2	14	0	51

=== Disciplinary record ===
Number	Nation	Position	Name	Tippeligaen		Playoffs		Norwegian Cup		Europa League		Total	
Number	Nation	Position	Name	Yellow card	Red card	Yellow card	Red card	Yellow card	Red card	Yellow card	Red card	Yellow card	Red card
1	(Ivory Coast)	GK	Sayouba Mandé	2	0	0	0	0	0	0	0	2	0
3	(Norway)	DF	Morten Skjønsberg	2	0	1	0	1	0	0	0	4	0
4	(Sweden)	DF	Marcus Nilsson	1	0	0	0	0	0	0	0	1	0
7	(Ghana)	MF	Ernest Asante	1	0	0	0	0	0	0	0	1	0
7	(Costa Rica)	FW	Mynor Escoe	1	0	0	0	0	0	0	0	1	0
8	(United States)	DF	Cole Grossman	2	0	0	0	0	0	0	0	2	0
9	(Georgia (country))	MF	Giorgi Gorozia	1	0	0	0	0	0	0	0	1	0
10	(Albania)	FW	Agon Mehmeti	4	0	0	0	1	0	0	0	5	0
13	(Norway)	MF	Eirik Haugstad	0	0	0	0	0	0	1	0	1	0
16	(Norway)	DF	Andreas Hanche-Olsen	2	0	1	0	0	0	0	0	3	0
17	(Scotland)	DF	Alex Davey	1	0	0	0	0	0	0	0	1	0
18	(Norway)	DF	Jeppe Moe	1	0	0	0	0	0	0	0	1	0
19	(Ghana)	MF	Shadrach Eghan	1	0	0	0	0	0	0	0	1	0
20	(Ghana)	MF	Kamal Issah	7	0	0	0	1	0	0	1	8	1
21	(Norway)	MF	Daniel Granli	1	0	0	0	0	0	0	0	1	0
25	(Norway)	DF	Birger Meling	6	0	0	0	1	0	0	0	7	0
28	(Ivory Coast)	MF	Luc Kassi	4	0	1	0	0	0	0	0	5	0
77	(Norway)	FW	Muhamed Keita	3	0	0	0	0	0	0	0	3	0
99	(Norway)	FW	Ohi Omoijuanfo	1	0	0	0	0	0	0	0	1	0
			Total	41	0	3	0	4	0	1	1	49	1
