= 2015 Stabæk Fotball season =

Stabæk
2015 season
- Chairman: Espen Moe
- Manager: Bob Bradley
- Stadium: Nadderud Stadion
- Tippeligaen: 3rd
- Norwegian Cup: Semifinal
- Top goalscorer: League: Adama Diomande (17); All: Adama Diomande (25)
Home colours	Away colours

The 2015 season was Stabæk's second season back in the Tippeligaen following their relegation in 2012, their 19th season in the top flight of Norwegian football and their second season with Bob Bradley as their manager. Stabæk finished the season in third place, qualifying for the 2016–17 UEFA Europa League First qualifying round. Stabæk also reached the Semifinals of the Norwegian Cup, where they were defeated by Rosenborg in extra time.

== Squad ==
As of 5 September 2015

Note: Flags indicate national team as defined under FIFA eligibility rules; some limited exceptions apply. Players may hold more than one non-FIFA nationality.

No.	Pos.	Nation	Player
1	GK	CIV	Sayouba Mandé
3	DF	NOR	Morten Skjønsberg
4	DF	NOR	Nicolai Næss
6	MF	GHA	Anthony Annan
7	FW	GHA	Ernest Asante
8	MF	USA	Cole Grossman
9	MF	GEO	Giorgi Gorozia
11	FW	BEL	Yassine El Ghanassy
12	GK	NOR	Christian Schaanning Mørch
13	FW	NOR	Eirik Haugstad
15	DF	FIN	Ville Jalasto
17	DF	NOR	Jesper Espung

No.	Pos.	Nation	Player
20	MF	GHA	Kamal Issah
21	MF	NOR	Daniel Granli
22	GK	IND	Gurpreet Singh Sandhu
25	DF	NOR	Birger Meling
28	MF	CIV	Luc Kassi
30	MF	NOR	Cornelius Bensick
40	MF	NOR	Marius Østvold
42	GK	NOR	Simen Omholt-Jensen
50	DF	NOR	Andreas Hanche-Olsen
60	MF	NOR	Harald Holter
77	FW	NOR	Muhamed Keita (loan from Lech Poznań)

=== Out on loan ===
As of 18 August 2015.

Note: Flags indicate national team as defined under FIFA eligibility rules; some limited exceptions apply. Players may hold more than one non-FIFA nationality.

No.	Pos.	Nation	Player
14	FW	NOR	Emil Ekblom (at Strømmen)
18	MF	NZL	Craig Henderson (at Mjøndalen)

No.	Pos.	Nation	Player
—	MF	NOR	Emil Dahle (at Bryne)

== Transfers ==
=== Winter ===
In: Note: Flags indicate national team as defined under FIFA eligibility rules; some limited exceptions apply. Players may hold more than one non-FIFA nationality.

No.	Pos.	Nation	Player
2	DF	RUS	Yevgeni Kirisov (from (Russia) Domodedovo Moscow)
7	FW	GHA	Ernest Asante (from (Norway) Start)
8	MF	USA	Cole Grossman (from (United States) Real Salt Lake)
10	FW	NOR	Adama Diomande (from (Belarus) Dinamo Minsk)
11	FW	BEL	Yassine El Ghanassy (from (Belgium) Gent)
20	MF	GHA	Kamal Issah (from (Denmark) Nordsjælland)
16	DF	NOR	Thor Lange (loan return from (Norway) Strømmen)

Out: Note: Flags indicate national team as defined under FIFA eligibility rules; some limited exceptions apply. Players may hold more than one non-FIFA nationality.

No.	Pos.	Nation	Player
2	DF	DEN	Timmi Johansen (to (Denmark) Næsby)
6	FW	NOR	Fredrik Brustad (to (Sweden) AIK)
7	MF	USA	Andrew Jacobson (loan return to (United States) New York City)
8	FW	NOR	Stian Sortevik (to (Norway) KFUM Oslo)
10	MF	NOR	Emil Dahle (loan to (Norway) Start)
11	FW	CIV	Franck Boli (to (China) Liaoning Whowin)
12	GK	NOR	Borger Thomas (loan return to (Norway) Strømsgodset)
14	DF	NOR	Jon Inge Høiland (Retired)
16	MF	NOR	Magne Hoseth (to (Norway) Viking)
30	MF	USA	Michael Stephens (to (United States) Chicago Fire)
32	MF	NOR	Tomasz Sokolowski
81	MF	NOR	Anders Trondsen (to (Norway) Sarpsborg 08)

=== Summer ===
In: Note: Flags indicate national team as defined under FIFA eligibility rules; some limited exceptions apply. Players may hold more than one non-FIFA nationality.

No.	Pos.	Nation	Player
6	MF	GHA	Anthony Annan (from (Germany) 1860 München)
77	FW	NOR	Muhamed Keita (loan from (Poland) Lech Poznań)

Out: Note: Flags indicate national team as defined under FIFA eligibility rules; some limited exceptions apply. Players may hold more than one non-FIFA nationality.

No.	Pos.	Nation	Player
2	DF	RUS	Yevgeni Kirisov
5	DF	NOR	Jørgen Hammer (to (Norway) Start)
6	DF	NOR	Edvard Race
10	FW	NOR	Adama Diomande (to (England) Hull City)
18	MF	NZL	Craig Henderson (loan to (Norway) Mjøndalen)
14	FW	NOR	Emil Ekblom (on loan to (Norway) Strømmen)
—	FW	NOR	Emil Dahle (on loan to (Norway) Bryne, previously on loan to (Norway) Start)

== Friendlies ==
17 January 2015	Stabæk	4–1	Follo	Bærum
14:00 CET (UTC+1)	Dahle 3'; E.Ekblom 55', 58', 73'	Summary	H.Dalseth 76'	Stadium: Nadderud Stadion

23 January 2015	Bærum	2–0	Stabæk	Sandvika
14:00 CET (UTC+1)	S.Juklerød 56'; M.Benmoussa 63'	Summary		Stadium: Kadettangen

30 January 2015	Stabæk	0–2	Fredrikstad	Bærum
13:00 CET (UTC+1)		Summary	Nystrøm 61'; Johansen 64'	Stadium: Nadderud Stadion

7 February 2015	Stabæk	0–0	Vålerenga	Bærum
14:00 CET (UTC+1)		Summary		Stadium: Nadderud Stadion

7 March 2015	Stabæk	2–0	Sandefjord	Bærum
13:00 CET (UTC+1)	Haugstad 13'; Meling 52'	Summary		Stadium: Nadderud Stadion

12 March 2015	Stabæk	1–1	Bodø/Glimt	La Manga, Spain
15:00 CET (UTC+1)	Bensick 64'	Summary	Furebotn 28'; Badou (yellow card) 90'

16 March 2015	Rosenborg	4–0	Stabæk	La Manga, Spain
18:00 CET (UTC+1)	Helland 25', 38'; Nielsen 84'; Selnæs 87'	Summary

22 March 2015	Sarpsborg 08	2–2	Stabæk	Sarpsborg
15:00 CET (UTC+1)	Wiig 17'; Jensen 40'	Summary	Gorozia 29'; Ekblom 57'; Grossman (yellow card) 67'	Stadium: Sarpsborg Stadion

25 March 2015	Stabæk	0–2	Tromsø	Bærum
15:00 CET (UTC+1)		Summary	Åsen 6', 26'	Stadium: Nadderud Stadion

28 March 2015	Mjøndalen	2–2	Stabæk	Mjøndalen
14:00 CET (UTC+1)	Sosseh 59'; Kapidžić 78'	Summary	Issah 66'; Asante 69'	Stadium: Isachsen Stadion

=== Simple Invitational ===
Pos	Team	GP	W	L	D	GF	GA	GD	Pts
1	(Canada) Vancouver Whitecaps FC	3	2	0	1	5	3	+2	7
2	(United States) Portland Timbers	3	1	1	1	2	2	0	4
3	(United States) Chicago Fire	3	0	0	3	2	2	0	3
4	(Norway) Stabæk	3	0	2	1	2	4	-2	1

23 February 2015 Simple Invitational	(United States) Chicago Fire	0–0	Stabæk	Portland, Oregon
00:30 CET (UTC+1)	Cociș (yellow card) 51'	Report		Stadium: Providence Park

26 February 2015 Simple Invitational	(Canada) Vancouver Whitecaps FC	3–2	Stabæk	Portland, Oregon
01:00 CET (UTC+1)	Mezquida 13'; Mattocks 23' (pen.), 44'; Hurtado (yellow card) 24'; Sampson (yellow card) 70'	Report	Kassi (yellow card) 62'; Trondsen 68' (pen.); Haugstad 81'	Stadium: Providence Park

29 February 2015 Simple Invitational	(United States) Portland Timbers	1–0	Stabæk	Portland, Oregon
01:00 CET (UTC+1)	Adi 31'	Report	Issah (yellow card) 70'	Stadium: Providence Park; Attendance: 15,523

== Competitions ==
=== Tippeligaen ===
==== Results summary ====
Overall								Home						Away					
Pld	W	D	L	GF	GA	GD	Pts	W	D	L	GF	GA	GD	W	D	L	GF	GA	GD
30	17	5	8	51	41	+10	56	10	2	3	25	17	+8	7	3	5	26	24	+2

Last updated: 9 November 2015.
Source: see below

==== Results by round ====
Round	1	2	3	4	5	6	7	8	9	10	11	12	13	14	15	16	17	18	19	20	21	22	23	24	25	26	27	28	29	30
Ground	H	A	H	A	A	H	A	H	A	H	A	H	A	H	A	H	A	H	A	H	A	H	A	H	H	A	H	A	H	A
Result	D	L	W	W	W	W	W	W	D	L	W	W	D	W	L	D	D	W	W	W	W	L	L	W	W	W	L	L	W	L
Position	12	12	9	5	5	2	2	2	2	2	2	2	2	2	2	2	3	2	2	2	2	2	2	2	2	2	2	3	3	3

Updated to match(es) played on 9 November 2015. Source: see below
A = Away; H = Home; W = Win; D = Draw; L = Loss

==== Results ====
6 April 2015 1	Stabæk	1–1	Haugesund	Bærum
18:00 CEST (UTC+2)	Diomande 15'; Kassi (yellow card) 44'; Asante (yellow card) 81'	Summary	Andreassen (yellow card) 72'; Diedhou 80'; Haraldseid (yellow card) 89'	Stadium: Nadderud Stadion; Attendance: 3,512; Referee: Ken Henry Johnsen

12 April 2015 2	Odd	2–0	Stabæk	Skien
18:00 CEST (UTC+2)	Gashi (yellow card) 51'; Ruud 61' (pen.); Næss 75' (o.g.)	Summary	Gorozia (red card) 62'	Stadium: Skagerak Arena; Attendance: 8,123; Referee: Trond Ivar Døvle

19 April 2015 3	Stabæk	1–0	Viking	Bærum
18:00 CEST (UTC+2)	Næss (yellow card) 13'; Grossman (yellow card) 68' (goal) 87'	Summary	Mets (yellow card) 90'	Stadium: Nadderud Stadion; Attendance: 3,293; Referee: Tore Hansen

26 April 2015 4	Lillestrøm	0–2	Stabæk	Lillestrøm
18:00 CEST (UTC+2)	Kippe (yellow card) 35'	Summary	Issah (yellow card) 12' (goal) 45+1'; Asante 45'; Meling (yellow card) 90+1'	Stadium: Åråsen Stadion; Attendance: 4,881; Referee: Svein Erik Edvartsen

30 April 2015 5	Tromsø	0–2	Stabæk	Tromsø
18:00 CEST (UTC+2)		Summary	Issah (yellow card) 7'; Kassi (yellow card) 22'; Meling (yellow card) 39'; Asante 42'; Grossman 45+5'; Jalasto (yellow card) 52'	Stadium: Alfheim Stadion; Attendance: 3,080; Referee: Ken Henry Johnsen

3 May 2015 6	Stabæk	1–0	Mjøndalen	Bærum
18:00 CEST (UTC+2)	Issah (yellow card) 65'; Asante 70'; El Ghanassy (yellow card) 79'	Summary	Olsen (yellow card) 39'	Stadium: Nadderud Stadion; Attendance: 3,778; Referee: Tommy Skjerven

9 May 2015 7	Vålerenga	0–2	Stabæk	Oslo
20:00 CEST (UTC+2)	Grindheim (yellow card) 72'	Summary	Diomande 35' (pen.); Kassi (yellow card) 42' (yellow-red card) 56'; Asante 64'; El Ghanassy (yellow card) 75'	Stadium: Ullevaal Stadion; Attendance: 7,500; Referee: Tom Harald Hagen

13 May 2015 8	Stabæk	4–0	Sandefjord	Bærum
18:00 CEST (UTC+2)	Diomande 39', 56', 70'; Asante 48'	Summary		Stadium: Nadderud Stadion; Attendance: 3,329; Referee: Anders Johansen

16 May 2015 9	Molde	3–3	Stabæk	Molde
18:00 CEST (UTC+2)	Svendsen 34', 37'; Hussain (yellow card) 66'; Kamara 87'	Summary	Skjønsberg (yellow card) 38'; Diomande 39', 68'; Issah 61'; Meling (yellow card) 90'	Stadium: Aker Stadion; Attendance: 1 633; Referee: Dag Vidar Hafsås

25 May 2015 10	Stabæk	2–3	Rosenborg	Bærum
18:00 CEST (UTC+2)	Diomande 6' (yellow card) 43'; Dorsin 15' (o.g.)	Summary	Helland 39' (pen.) (yellow card) 66' (yellow-red card) 73'; Søderlund 41', 63' (yellow card) 82'	Stadium: Nadderud Stadion; Attendance: 4,938; Referee: Svein Oddvar Moen

31 May 2015 11	Sarpsborg 08	0–1	Stabæk	Sarpsborg
18:00 CEST (UTC+2)	Jensen (yellow card) 50'	Summary	Diomande 68'	Stadium: Sarpsborg Stadion; Attendance: 3,977; Referee: Anders Johansen

7 June 2015 12	Stabæk	3–2	Bodø/Glimt	Bærum
18:00 CEST (UTC+2)	Jalasto 31'; Asante 59'; Gorozia 68'	Summary	Sørloth 9'; Badou (yellow card) 75'; Brix (yellow card) 88'; Olsen 90+2'	Stadium: Nadderud Stadion; Attendance: 3,805; Referee: Espen Berntsen

21 June 2015 13	Aalesund	1–1	Stabæk	Ålesund
18:00 CEST (UTC+2)	Abdellaoue 6'; Larsen (yellow card) 30'	Summary	Grossman 45'; Meling (yellow card) 58'	Stadium: Color Line Stadion; Attendance: 6,518; Referee: Tommy Skjerven

27 June 2015 14	Stabæk	3–2	Strømsgodset	Bærum
20:00 CEST (UTC+2)	Meling 22'; Asante 40'; El Ghanassy 58'; Gorozia (yellow card) 60'	Summary	Ogunjimi 46' (yellow card) 59'; Abu (yellow card) 47' (yellow-red card) 82'; Wikheim 49'; Hanin (yellow card) 59'	Stadium: Nadderud Stadion; Attendance: 3,923; Referee: Kim Andre Johnsen

4 July 2015 15	Start	4–1	Stabæk	Kristiansand
15:30 CEST (UTC+2)	Vilhjálmsson 20'; Hoff 45+1'; Ajer 53', 69'; Sandnes (yellow card) 87'	Summary	Diomande 68'	Stadium: Sør Arena; Attendance: 5,221; Referee: Anders Johansen

12 July 2015 16	Stabæk	0–0	Sarpsborg 08	Bærum
15:30 CEST (UTC+2)	Diomande (yellow card) 59'	Summary	Jensen (yellow card) 43'; Trondsen (yellow card) 49'; Øby (yellow card) 58'	Stadium: Nadderud Stadion; Attendance: 3,298; Referee: Svein Oddvar Moen

25 July 2015 17	Haugesund	2–2	Stabæk	Haugesund
18:00 CEST (UTC+2)	Haukås 31'; Cvetinović (yellow card) 74'; Skjerve 90+1'	Summary	Jalasto 11' (yellow card) 63'; Næss (yellow card) 21'; Diomande 41'; Grossman (yellow card) 74'	Stadium: Haugesund Stadion; Attendance: 4,533; Referee: Kim Andre Johnsen

1 August 2015 18	Stabæk	2–0	Vålerenga	Bærum
18:00 CEST (UTC+2)	Asante 11'; Kassi 72'	Summary	Stengel (yellow card) 82'	Stadium: Nadderud Stadion; Attendance: 4,782; Referee: Espen Berntsen

9 August 2015 19	Strømsgodset	0–2	Stabæk	Drammen
18:00 CEST (UTC+2)	Vilsvik (yellow card) 42'; Wikheim (yellow card) 83'	Summary	Diomande 54', 76'	Stadium: Marienlyst Stadion; Attendance: 6,661; Referee: Dag Vidar Hafsås

16 August 2015 20	Stabæk	3–2	Lillestrøm	Bærum
20:00 CEST (UTC+2)	Diomande 50', 88'; Gorozia (yellow card) 66'; Næss 86'	Summary	Friday 15'; Kolstad 30'; Ringstad (yellow card) 53'; Knudtzon (yellow card) 79'	Stadium: Nadderud Stadion; Attendance: 3,610; Referee: Svein Oddvar Moen

22 August 2015 21	Sandefjord	2–4	Stabæk	Sandefjord
18:00 CEST (UTC+2)	Kirkevold 27', 73' (yellow card) 90+3'; Dieng (yellow card) 33'; Mjelde (yellow card) 62'; Hansen (yellow card) 84'	Summary	Diomande 4', 75' (pen.); Grossman 11'; Kassi 86'	Stadium: Komplett Arena; Referee: Espen Berntsen

30 August 2015 22	Stabæk	1–2	Odd	Bærum
15:30 CEST (UTC+2)	Keita (yellow card) 58'; Kassi 84'	Summary	Bentley 10'; Occéan 34' (pen.); Gashi (yellow card) 53' (yellow-red card) 65'	Stadium: Nadderud Stadion; Attendance: 4,523; Referee: Kim Andre Johnsen

13 September 2015 23	Rosenborg	1–0	Stabæk	Trondheim
18:00 CEST (UTC+2)	Midtsjø (yellow card) 76'; Selnæs (yellow card) 88'; Konradsen 90+3'	Summary	Keita (yellow card) 45'; Jalasto (yellow card) 55'; Grossman (yellow card) 75'	Stadium: Lerkendal Stadion; Attendance: 19,981; Referee: Svein-Erik Edvartsen

19 September 2015 24	Stabæk	2–1	Tromsø	Bærum
18:00 CEST (UTC+2)	Kassi 31'; Keita 90+3'	Summary	Johansen 58'; Oršulić (yellow card) 83'; Landu Landu (yellow card) 85'	Stadium: Nadderud Stadion; Attendance: 3,456; Referee: Kai Erik Steen

27 September 2015 25	Stabæk	1–0	Molde	Bærum
20:00 CEST (UTC+2)	Keita 14'	Summary	Forren (yellow card) 36'	Stadium: Nadderud Stadion; Attendance: 3,538; Referee: Tommy Skjerven

3 October 2015 26	Mjøndalen	1–4	Stabæk	Mjøndalen
18:00 CEST (UTC+2)	Aasmundsen (yellow card) 24'; Hurtado 47'	Summary	Asante 13'; Kassi 31', 76'; El Ghanassy 65' (pen.)	Stadium: Isachsen Stadion; Attendance: 2,272; Referee: Andres Johansen

17 October 2015 27	Stabæk	1–4	Aalesund	Bærum
18:00 CEST (UTC+2)	Asante (yellow card) 52' (goal) 74'	Summary	Hoseth 34', 79'; Matland 51'; Latifu (yellow card) 68'; James (yellow card) 76' (goal) 90'	Stadium: Nadderud Stadion; Attendance: 3,852; Referee: Kim Andre Johnsen

25 October 2015 28	Viking	2–1	Stabæk	Stavanger
20:00 CET (UTC+1)	Danielsen 11'; Abdullahi 70'; Mets (yellow card) 75'; Haugen (yellow card) 78'	Summary	Kassi 24'	Stadium: Viking stadion Attendance: 10,459; Referee: Tom Harald Hagen

1 November 2015 29	Stabæk	3–2	Start	Bærum
18:00 CET (UTC+1)	Kassi 31'; Issah 53'; Jalasto 82'	Summary	Stokkelien 45'; Vikstøl 48'; Ajer (yellow card) 88'; Hoff (yellow card) 90+4'	Stadium: Nadderud Stadion; Attendance: 4,567; Referee: Anders Johansen

8 November 2015 30	Bodø/Glimt	6–1	Stabæk	Bodø
18:00 CET (UTC+1)	Brix (yellow card) 15'; Olsen 47'; Konradsen 51', 54'; Sørloth 64' (pen.), 67', 88'; Cruz (yellow card) 85'	Summary	El Ghanassy 14'	Stadium: Aspmyra stadion Attendance: 2,286; Referee: Tommy Skjerven

==== Table ====
Pos	Team	Pld	W	D	L	GF	GA	GD	Pts	Qualification or relegation
1	Rosenborg (C)	30	21	6	3	73	27	+46	69	Qualification for the Champions League second qualifying round (Note: Rosenborg qualified for the Europa League second qualifying round by winning the 2015 Norwegian Cup. However, since they already qualified for European competition based on their league position, the spot awarded to the cup winners was passed down the league.)
2	Strømsgodset	30	17	6	7	67	44	+23	57	Qualification for the Europa League second qualifying round
3	Stabæk	30	17	5	8	54	43	+11	56	Qualification for the Europa League first qualifying round
4	Odd	30	15	10	5	61	41	+20	55	Qualification for the Europa League first qualifying round
5	Viking	30	17	2	11	53	39	+14	53	

Source: Football Association of Norway (in Norwegian), Soccerway
Rules for classification: 1) Points; 2) Goal difference; 3) Goals scored; 4) Head-to-head points; 5) Head-to-head goal difference; 6) Head-to-head away goals scored (between two teams).
(C) Champions

=== Norwegian Cup ===
22 April 2015 First Round	Runar	0–6	Stabæk	Sandefjord
18:00 CEST (UTC+2)		Summary	Ekblom 7'; Diomande 24', 39'; Issah 30', 44'; Bensick 69'	Stadium: Haukerød Idrettsplass; Referee: Mohammed Uslem Aslem

6 May 2015 Second Round	KFUM Oslo	1–3	Stabæk	Oslo
18:00 CEST (UTC+2)	Dymbe (yellow card) 73'; Obeng 76'	Summary	Diomande 27'; Gorozia 33'; Granli 50'; Skjønsberg (yellow card) 52'; Kassi (yellow card) 83'	Stadium: KFUM Arena; Attendance: 934; Referee: Anders Hauglund

3 June 2015 Third round	Senja	1–3	Stabæk	Silsand
18:00 CEST (UTC+2)	Østeraas (yellow card) 41'; Bakkelund (yellow card) 58'; Johnsgård 74'	Summary	Gorozia (yellow card) 9'; Diomande 42', 58'; Asante 85'	Stadium: Islandbotn; Attendance: 603; Referee: Christian Moen

24 June 2015 Fourth round	Stabæk	5–1	Strømmen	Bærum
19:00 CEST (UTC+2)	Asante 34'; Jalasto 63'; Diomande 70', 77'; Granli 83'	Summary	M.Ramsland 17' (yellow card) 52'; Konate (yellow card) 37'; F.Nilsen (red card) 69'	Stadium: Nadderud Stadion; Attendance: 1,890; Referee: Tom Harald Hagen

13 August 2015 Quarterfinal	Sandefjord	0–1	Stabæk	Sandefjord
19:00 CEST (UTC+2)	Bindia (yellow card) 67'; Kurtovic (yellow card) 87'	Summary	Diomande 64'	Stadium: Komplett Arena; Attendance: 1,824; Referee: Tommy Skjerven

23 September 2015 Semifinal	Rosenborg	3–2 (a.e.t.)	Stabæk	Trondheim
20:00 CEST (UTC+2)	Helland 7'; Søderlund 78' (pen.); Selnæs (yellow card) 79'; Vilhjálmsson 95'	Summary	Annan (yellow card) 15'; Keita 52' (yellow card) 90+1'; Jalasto (yellow card) 59'; Næss 70' (pen.); Issah (yellow card) 109'	Stadium: Lerkendal Stadion; Attendance: 9,932; Referee: Tom Harald Hagen

== Squad statistics ==
As of match played 8 November 2015

=== Appearances and goals ===
No.	Pos	Nat	Player	Total		Tippeligaen		Norwegian Cup	
No.	Pos	Nat	Player	Apps	Goals	Apps	Goals	Apps	Goals
1	GK	(Ivory Coast) CIV	Sayouba Mandé	35	0	30	0	5	0
3	DF	(Norway) NOR	Morten Skjønsberg	35	0	30	0	5	0
4	DF	(Norway) NOR	Nicolai Næss	34	2	29	1	5	1
6	MF	(Ghana) GHA	Anthony Annan	8	0	7	0	1	0
7	FW	(Ghana) GHA	Ernest Asante	36	12	30	10	5+1	2
8	MF	(United States) USA	Cole Grossman	33	4	28	4	5	0
9	MF	(Georgia (country)) GEO	Giorgi Gorozia	32	2	15+11	1	5+1	1
11	FW	(Belgium) BEL	Yassine El Ghanassy	30	3	24+2	3	1+3	0
13	FW	(Norway) NOR	Eirik Haugstad	27	0	0+23	0	2+2	0
14	FW	(Norway) NOR	Emil Ekblom	7	1	0+5	0	1+1	1
15	DF	(Finland) FIN	Ville Jalasto	33	4	29	3	4	1
20	MF	(Ghana) GHA	Kamal Issah	31	5	21+5	3	4+1	2
21	MF	(Norway) NOR	Daniel Granli	27	2	8+14	0	3+2	2
22	GK	(India) IND	Gurpreet Singh Sandhu	1	0	0	0	1	0
25	DF	(Norway) NOR	Birger Meling	32	1	26+1	1	5	0
28	MF	(Ivory Coast) CIV	Luc Kassi	34	8	23+5	8	6	0
30	MF	(Norway) NOR	Cornelius Bensick	5	1	0+2	0	0+3	1
60	DF	(Norway) NOR	Edvard Race	2	0	0+1	0	1	0
77	FW	(Norway) NOR	Muhamed Keita	13	3	9+2	2	1+1	1
Players away from Stabæk on loan:
	MF	(Norway) NOR	Emil Dahle	0	0	0	0	0	0
Players who appeared for Stabæk no longer at the club:
2	DF	(Russia) RUS	Yevgeni Kirisov	1	0	0	0	0+1	0
5	DF	(Norway) NOR	Jørgen Hammer	2	0	1	0	1	0
10	FW	(Norway) NOR	Adama Diomande	26	25	21	17	5	8
60	MF	(Norway) NOR	Harald Holter	1	0	0	0	0+1	0

=== Goal scorers ===
Place	Position	Nation	Number	Name	Tippeligaen	Norwegian Cup	Total
1	FW	(Norway)	10	Adama Diomande	17	8	25
2	FW	(Ghana)	7	Ernest Asante	10	2	12
3	MF	(Ivory Coast)	28	Luc Kassi	8	0	8
4	MF	(Ghana)	20	Kamal Issah	3	2	5
5	MF	(United States)	8	Cole Grossman	4	0	4
5	DF	(Finland)	15	Ville Jalasto	3	1	4
7	FW	(Belgium)	11	Yassine El Ghanassy	3	0	3
7	FW	(Norway)	77	Muhamed Keita	2	1	3
9	MF	(Georgia (country))	9	Giorgi Gorozia	1	1	2
9	DF	(Norway)	4	Nicolai Næss	1	1	2
9	DF	(Norway)	21	Daniel Granli	0	2	2
12	MF	(Norway)	25	Birger Meling	1	0	1
12	FW	(Norway)	14	Emil Ekblom	0	1	1
12	MF	(Norway)	30	Cornelius Bensick	0	1	1
12				Own goal	0	1	1
				TOTALS	54	20	74

=== Disciplinary record ===
Number	Nation	Position	Name	Tippeligaen		Norwegian Cup		Total	
Number	Nation	Position	Name	Yellow card	Red card	Yellow card	Red card	Yellow card	Red card
3	(Norway)	DF	Morten Skjønsberg	1	0	1	0	2	0
4	(Norway)	DF	Nicolai Næss	2	0	0	0	2	0
6	(Ghana)	MF	Anthony Annan	0	0	1	0	1	0
7	(Ghana)	FW	Ernest Asante	2	0	0	0	2	0
8	(United States)	MF	Cole Grossman	3	0	0	0	3	0
9	(Georgia (country))	MF	Giorgi Gorozia	2	1	1	0	3	1
10	(Norway)	FW	Adama Diomande	2	0	0	0	2	0
11	(Belgium)	FW	Yassine El Ghanassy	2	0	0	0	2	0
15	(Finland)	DF	Ville Jalasto	3	0	1	0	4	0
20	(Ghana)	MF	Kamal Issah	3	0	1	0	4	0
25	(Norway)	DF	Birger Meling	4	0	0	0	4	0
28	(Ivory Coast)	MF	Luc Kassi	4	1	1	0	5	1
77	(Norway)	FW	Muhamed Keita	2	0	1	0	3	0
			TOTALS	30	2	7	0	37	2
