= List of Norwegian football transfers winter 2014–15 =

This is a list of Norwegian football transfers in the winter transfer window 2014–15 by club. Only clubs of the 2015 Tippeligaen and 2015 Norwegian First Division is included.

== 2015 Tippeligaen ==
=== Bodø/Glimt ===
In: Note: Flags indicate national team as defined under FIFA eligibility rules; some limited exceptions apply. Players may hold more than one non-FIFA nationality.

No.	Pos.	Nation	Player
4	DF	POR	Joshua Silva (free agent)
8	MF	NOR	Henrik Furebotn (from (Norway) Sandnes)
9	FW	NOR	Jim Johansen (loan return from (Norway) Bryne)
10	FW	NOR	Fitim Azemi (from (Norway) Follo)
11	FW	NOR	Alexander Sørloth (on loan from (Norway) Rosenborg)
11	FW	NOR	Vegard Braaten (loan return from (Norway) Alta)
18	DF	NOR	Brede Moe (from (Norway) Rosenborg)
26	FW	USA	Danny Cruz (on loan from (United States) Philadelphia Union)
26	FW	NOR	Viljar Nordberg (loan return from (Norway) Harstad)

Out: Note: Flags indicate national team as defined under FIFA eligibility rules; some limited exceptions apply. Players may hold more than one non-FIFA nationality.

No.	Pos.	Nation	Player
4	DF	NOR	Thomas Braaten (to (Norway) Hønefoss)
9	FW	NOR	Jim Johansen (on loan to (Norway) Sogndal)
10	FW	NOR	Ibba Laajab (to Hebei China Fortune)
11	FW	NOR	Vegard Braaten (to (Norway) Levanger)
17	MF	NOR	Mathias Normann (on loan to (Norway) Alta)
19	FW	SEN	Mouhamadou Moustapha N'Diaye (loan return to (Czech Republic) Slovan Liberec)
28	FW	JAM	Dane Richards (to (United States) New York Red Bulls)

=== Haugesund ===
In: Note: Flags indicate national team as defined under FIFA eligibility rules; some limited exceptions apply. Players may hold more than one non-FIFA nationality.

No.	Pos.	Nation	Player
6	MF	DEN	Patrick Olsen (from (Italy) Inter Milan)
17	MF	DEN	Søren Christensen (from (Denmark) FC Nordsjælland)
20	FW	SEN	Simon Diedhiou
21	FW	FIN	Roope Riski (from (Norway) Hønefoss)
28	MF	NOR	Arent-Emil Hauge (promoted)
29	MF	NOR	Robert Kling (promoted)

Out: Note: Flags indicate national team as defined under FIFA eligibility rules; some limited exceptions apply. Players may hold more than one non-FIFA nationality.

No.	Pos.	Nation	Player
6	FW	NGA	Emmanuel Ekpo (released)
9	FW	SRB	Nikola Komazec (on loan to (Thailand) Pattaya United)
12	GK	NOR	Olav Dalen (to (Norway) Nordre Land)
14	FW	NOR	Torbjørn Agdestein (on loan to (Norway) Kristiansund)
16	MF	NGA	Ugonna Anyora (to (Norway) Hønefoss)
17	MF	NOR	Geir Ludvig Fevang (to (Norway) Sandefjord)
20	MF	SWE	Maic Sema (to (Cyprus) AEL Limassol)
21	FW	SWE	Pontus Engblom (to (Norway) Sandnes Ulf)
26	DF	NOR	Sverre Bjørkkjær (on loan to (Norway) Åsane)
—	MF	UGA	Tony Mawejje (released)

=== Lillestrøm ===
In: Note: Flags indicate national team as defined under FIFA eligibility rules; some limited exceptions apply. Players may hold more than one non-FIFA nationality.

No.	Pos.	Nation	Player
1	GK	NOR	Kenneth Udjus (loan return from (Norway) Sogndal)
5	DF	FIN	Lum Rexhepi (from (Finland) FC Honka)
6	MF	ISL	Finnur Ori Margeirsson (from (Iceland) Breiðablik UBK)
9	FW	ISL	Árni Vilhjálmsson (from (Iceland) Breiðablik UBK)
14	MF	NOR	Fredrik Krogstad (from (Norway) Lørenskog)
19	FW	NOR	Joachim Osvold (loan return from (Finland) TPS)
27	MF	NOR	Markus Brændsrød (from (Norway) Vålerenga)

Out: Note: Flags indicate national team as defined under FIFA eligibility rules; some limited exceptions apply. Players may hold more than one non-FIFA nationality.

No.	Pos.	Nation	Player
1	GK	NOR	Kenneth Udjus (to (Norway) Brann)
10	MF	NOR	Petter Vaagan Moen (to (Norway) Strømsgodset)
14	MF	ISL	Pálmi Rafn Pálmason (to (Iceland) KR)
16	MF	NOR	Ohi Omoijuanfo (to (Norway) Jerv)
17	MF	NOR	Erik Mjelde (to (Norway) Sandefjord)

=== Mjøndalen ===
In: Note: Flags indicate national team as defined under FIFA eligibility rules; some limited exceptions apply. Players may hold more than one non-FIFA nationality.

No.	Pos.	Nation	Player
6	MF	NOR	Michael Stilson (from (Norway) Lokomotiv Oslo)
21	MF	NOR	Magnus Sylling Olsen (from (Norway) HamKam)
23	FW	NOR	Tim André Nilsen (from (Norway) Sogndal)
24	MF	SEN	Amidou Diop (on loan from (Norway) Molde)

Out: Note: Flags indicate national team as defined under FIFA eligibility rules; some limited exceptions apply. Players may hold more than one non-FIFA nationality.

No.	Pos.	Nation	Player
6	MF	NOR	Bjarne Kortgaard Ingebretsen (retired)
21	MF	NOR	Magnus Sylling Olsen (loan return to (Norway) HamKam)

=== Molde ===
In: Note: Flags indicate national team as defined under FIFA eligibility rules; some limited exceptions apply. Players may hold more than one non-FIFA nationality.

No.	Pos.	Nation	Player
2	DF	NOR	Fredrik Semb Berge (on loan from (Denmark) Brøndby)
10	MF	NOR	Thomas Kind Bendiksen (from (Norway) Tromsø)
11	FW	NOR	Ola Kamara (on loan from Austria Wien)
17	FW	NOR	Mushaga Bakenga (on loan from (Belgium) Club Brugge)
26	GK	SWE	Andreas Linde (from (Sweden) Helsingborg)
31	FW	USA	Ben Spencer (loan return from (United States) Indy Eleven)
33	MF	NOR	Andreas Hollingen (loan return from (Norway) HamKam)

Out: Note: Flags indicate national team as defined under FIFA eligibility rules; some limited exceptions apply. Players may hold more than one non-FIFA nationality.

No.	Pos.	Nation	Player
1	GK	NOR	Espen Bugge Pettersen (to (Norway) Strømsgodset)
2	DF	SEN	Seydina Keita (loan return to (Senegal) Diambars FC)
3	MF	SEN	Amidou Diop (on loan to (Norway) Mjøndalen)
11	FW	ISL	Björn Bergmann Sigurðarson (loan return to (England) Wolverhampton Wanderers)
27	FW	NGA	Daniel Chima Chukwu (to (China) Shanghai Shenxin)
29	FW	ENG	John Cofie (to (England) Crawley Town)
33	MF	NOR	Andreas Hollingen (on loan to (Norway) Start)
37	DF	NOR	Ole Martin Rindarøy (on loan to (Norway) Start)
38	MF	NOR	Stian Rode Gregersen (on loan to (Norway) Kristiansund)
—	DF	NOR	Magnar Ødegaard (to (Norway) Tromsø)
—	FW	SEN	Aliou Coly (to (Norway) Kristiansund)

=== Odd ===
In: Note: Flags indicate national team as defined under FIFA eligibility rules; some limited exceptions apply. Players may hold more than one non-FIFA nationality.

No.	Pos.	Nation	Player
2	DF	NOR	Espen Ruud (from (Denmark) Odense)
6	MF	NOR	Oliver Berg (from (Norway) Raufoss)
10	FW	CAN	Olivier Occéan (on loan from (Germany) Eintracht Frankfurt)

Out: Note: Flags indicate national team as defined under FIFA eligibility rules; some limited exceptions apply. Players may hold more than one non-FIFA nationality.

No.	Pos.	Nation	Player
1	GK	NOR	André Hansen (to (Norway) Rosenborg)
6	MF	NOR	Christer Kleiven (to (Norway) Vigør)
9	FW	NOR	Henrik Kjelsrud Johansen (on loan to (Norway) Fredrikstad)
10	MF	ALB	Herolind Shala (to (Czech Republic) Sparta Prague)
19	FW	NOR	Snorre Krogsgård (to (Sweden) Halmstad)

=== Rosenborg ===
In: Note: Flags indicate national team as defined under FIFA eligibility rules; some limited exceptions apply. Players may hold more than one non-FIFA nationality.

No.	Pos.	Nation	Player
1	GK	NOR	André Hansen (from (Norway) Odd)
18	MF	SCO	Liam Henderson (on loan from (Scotland) Celtic)
21	MF	NOR	Fredrik Midtsjø (loan return from (Norway) Sandnes)
36	FW	NOR	Andreas Klausen Helmersen (promoted)
—	GK	NOR	Julian Faye Lund (from (Norway) Oppsal, from 15 July 2015)

Out: Note: Flags indicate national team as defined under FIFA eligibility rules; some limited exceptions apply. Players may hold more than one non-FIFA nationality.

No.	Pos.	Nation	Player
1	GK	SWE	Daniel Örlund (to (Finland) HJK Helsinki)
5	DF	NOR	Per Verner Rønning (on loan to (Norway) Levanger)
18	DF	NOR	Brede Moe (to (Norway) Bodø/Glimt)
18	MF	NOR	Daniel Berntsen (to (Sweden) Djurgården)
30	GK	NOR	Lars Stubhaug
31	MF	NOR	Bent Sørmo (on loan to (Norway) Levanger)
34	DF	NOR	Aslak Fonn Witry (on loan to (Norway) Ranheim)
37	FW	NOR	Alexander Sørloth (on loan to (Norway) Bodø/Glimt)
42	MF	USA	Mikkel Diskerud (to (United States) New York City FC)

=== Sandefjord ===
In: Note: Flags indicate national team as defined under FIFA eligibility rules; some limited exceptions apply. Players may hold more than one non-FIFA nationality.

No.	Pos.	Nation	Player
1	GK	DEN	Jakob Busk (on loan from (Denmark) Copenhagen)
7	MF	NOR	Geir Ludvig Fevang (from (Norway) Haugesund)
8	MF	NOR	Erik Mjelde (from (Norway) Lillestrøm)
12	GK	NOR	Lars Herlofsen (from (Norway) Tromsø)
20	FW	NOR	Jean Mendy (from (Norway) Kristiansund)
40	GK	DEN	Michael Tørnes (Free agent)
—	DF	NOR	Kim Skogsrud (loan return from (Norway) Strømmen)

Out: Note: Flags indicate national team as defined under FIFA eligibility rules; some limited exceptions apply. Players may hold more than one non-FIFA nationality.

No.	Pos.	Nation	Player
1	GK	NOR	Eirik Holmen Johansen (loan return to (England) Manchester City)
2	FW	NOR	Cato Hansen (to (Norway) Egersund)
7	MF	NOR	Ørjan Røyrane (to (Norway) Kongsvinger)
8	MF	NOR	Lars Iver Strand (released)
24	MF	NOR	Andreas Diserud (on loan to (Norway) Fram Larvik)
—	DF	NOR	Kim Skogsrud (to (Norway) Egersund)

=== Sarpsborg 08 ===
In: Note: Flags indicate national team as defined under FIFA eligibility rules; some limited exceptions apply. Players may hold more than one non-FIFA nationality.

No.	Pos.	Nation	Player
6	MF	NOR	Anders Trondsen (from (Norway) Stabæk)
8	FW	EST	Henrik Ojamaa (loan from (Poland) Legia Warsaw)
10	MF	SWE	Liridon Kalludra (from (Norway) Kristiansund)
15	DF	NOR	Sigurd Rosted (from (Norway) Kjelsås)
19	DF	ALG	Habib Bellaïd (free agent)
20	MF	NOR	Simen Brenne (free agent)
44	FW	NOR	Leonard Getz (from (Norway) Fredrikstad)
45	GK	USA	Quentin Westberg (free agent)
77	FW	NOR	Amin Askar (on loan from (Norway) Brann)
92	MF	NOR	Kamer Qaka (from (Norway) Hønefoss)
—	MF	NOR	Magnus Hart (from (Norway) Fredrikstad)
—	FW	DEN	Patrick Mortensen (from (Denmark) Lyngby)

Out: Note: Flags indicate national team as defined under FIFA eligibility rules; some limited exceptions apply. Players may hold more than one non-FIFA nationality.

No.	Pos.	Nation	Player
6	DF	GER	Jérome Polenz (to (Australia) Brisbane Roar)
8	MF	ISL	Guðmundur Þórarinsson (to (Denmark) FC Nordsjælland)
10	FW	CRC	Alejandro Castro (loan return to (Norway) Start)
25	MF	NOR	Martin Hoel Andersen (on loan to (Norway) Kvik Halden)
31	GK	NOR	Christian Sukke (on loan to (Norway) Sogndal)
43	DF	NOR	Brice Wembangomo (on loan to (Norway) Kvik Halden)
69	DF	FRA	Jérémy Berthod (retired)
—	MF	NOR	Gagandeep Singh Lally (released)

=== Stabæk ===
In: Note: Flags indicate national team as defined under FIFA eligibility rules; some limited exceptions apply. Players may hold more than one non-FIFA nationality.

No.	Pos.	Nation	Player
2	DF	RUS	Yevgeni Kirisov (from (Russia) Domodedovo Moscow)
7	FW	GHA	Ernest Asante (from (Norway) Start)
8	MF	USA	Cole Grossman (from (United States) Real Salt Lake)
10	FW	NOR	Adama Diomande (from (Belarus) Dinamo Minsk)
11	FW	BEL	Yassine El Ghanassy (free agent)
14	FW	NOR	Emil Ekblom
20	MF	GHA	Kamal Issah (from (Denmark) Nordsjælland)

Out: Note: Flags indicate national team as defined under FIFA eligibility rules; some limited exceptions apply. Players may hold more than one non-FIFA nationality.

No.	Pos.	Nation	Player
2	DF	DEN	Timmi Johansen (to (Denmark) Næsby)
6	FW	NOR	Fredrik Brustad (to (Sweden) AIK)
7	MF	USA	Andrew Jacobson (loan return to (United States) New York City)
8	MF	NOR	Stian Sortevik (to (Norway) KFUM Oslo)
10	MF	NOR	Emil Dahle (on loan to (Norway) Start)
11	FW	CIV	Franck Boli (to (China) Liaoning Whowin)
12	GK	NOR	Borger Thomas (loan return to (Norway) Strømsgodset)
14	DF	NOR	Jon Inge Høiland (retired)
16	MF	NOR	Magne Hoseth (to (Norway) Viking)
24	MF	NOR	Anders Trondsen (to (Norway) Sarpsborg 08)
30	MF	USA	Michael Stephens (to (United States) Chicago Fire)
32	MF	NOR	Tomasz Sokolowski (released)

=== Start ===
In: Note: Flags indicate national team as defined under FIFA eligibility rules; some limited exceptions apply. Players may hold more than one non-FIFA nationality.

No.	Pos.	Nation	Player
3	DF	NOR	Ole Martin Rindarøy (on loan from (Norway) Molde)
4	DF	USA	Alex DeJohn (from (Finland) TPS)
9	MF	NOR	Emil Dahle (on loan from (Norway) Stabæk)
11	FW	CRC	Alejandro Castro (loan return from (Norway) Sarpsborg 08)
15	DF	DEN	Michael Christensen (from (Denmark) FC Vestsjælland)
16	MF	NOR	Andreas Hollingen (on loan from (Norway) Molde)
23	MF	NOR	Erlend Segberg (from (Norway) Vigør)
25	GK	ISL	Ingvar Jónsson (from (Iceland) Stjarnan)
27	MF	NOR	Eirik Wichne (from (Norway) Mandalskameratene)
30	FW	NOR	Lasse Sigurdsen (from (Norway) Flekkerøy)

Out: Note: Flags indicate national team as defined under FIFA eligibility rules; some limited exceptions apply. Players may hold more than one non-FIFA nationality.

No.	Pos.	Nation	Player
2	DF	NOR	Glenn Andersen (to (Norway) Jerv)
4	MF	NGA	Seyi Olofinjana (released)
9	FW	GHA	Ernest Asante (to (Norway) Stabæk)
11	FW	CRC	Alejandro Castro (on loan to (Norway) Brann)
13	FW	NOR	Zlatko Tripić (to (Germany) Greuther Fürth)
15	DF	CRC	Bismar Acosta (to (Norway) Brann)
16	FW	NOR	Alexander Lind (to (Norway) Jerv)
30	GK	NOR	Terje Reinertsen (retired)
33	DF	NOR	Amin Nouri (to (Norway) Brann)
99	MF	CRC	Fernando Paniagua (released)

=== Strømsgodset ===
In: Note: Flags indicate national team as defined under FIFA eligibility rules; some limited exceptions apply. Players may hold more than one non-FIFA nationality.

No.	Pos.	Nation	Player
1	GK	NOR	Espen Bugge Pettersen (from (Norway) Molde)
6	DF	FRA	Florent Hanin (free agent)
8	MF	NOR	Petter Vaagan Moen (from (Norway) Lillestrøm)
12	GK	NOR	Borger Thomas (loan return from (Norway) Stabæk)
17	FW	NOR	Thomas Lehne Olsen (loan return from (Norway) Ull/Kisa)
18	DF	NOR	Henrik Bredeli (promoted)
58	DF	NOR	Christoffer Lindquist (promoted)
92	MF	NOR	Tokmac Nguen (loan return from (Norway) Bærum)
—	FW	NOR	Abdul-Basit Agouda (from (Norway) Skeid)

Out: Note: Flags indicate national team as defined under FIFA eligibility rules; some limited exceptions apply. Players may hold more than one non-FIFA nationality.

No.	Pos.	Nation	Player
3	DF	USA	Jeb Brovsky (loan return to (United States) New York City FC)
6	MF	NOR	Simen Brenne (released)
12	GK	GHA	Adam Larsen Kwarasey (to (United States) Portland Timbers)
16	MF	NOR	Martin Ødegaard (to (Spain) Real Madrid)
18	MF	GHA	Divine Naah (loan return to (England) Manchester City)
27	DF	NOR	Jarl-André Storbæk (to (Norway) Nybergsund IL-Trysil)
30	GK	NOR	Hermann Rhodén (to (Norway) Drammen FK)
44	DF	MKD	Stefan Aškovski (loan return to (Serbia) Partizan)
90	MF	DEN	Patrick Olsen (loan return to (Italy) Inter)
—	FW	NOR	Abdul-Basit Agouda (on loan to (Norway) Skeid)

=== Tromsø ===
In: Note: Flags indicate national team as defined under FIFA eligibility rules; some limited exceptions apply. Players may hold more than one non-FIFA nationality.

No.	Pos.	Nation	Player
2	DF	NOR	Magnar Ødegaard (from (Norway) Molde)
6	MF	NOR	Christian Landu Landu (from (Norway) Viking)
7	MF	SWE	Marcus Hansson (from (Sweden) Gefle IF)
8	MF	NOR	Gjermund Åsen (from (Norway) Ranheim)
12	GK	NOR	Gudmund Taksdal Kongshavn (from (Norway) Vålerenga)
23	GK	NOR	Pål Vestly Heigre (on loan from (Norway) Viking)

Out: Note: Flags indicate national team as defined under FIFA eligibility rules; some limited exceptions apply. Players may hold more than one non-FIFA nationality.

No.	Pos.	Nation	Player
7	DF	FIN	Miika Koppinen (retired)
8	MF	NOR	Thomas Kind Bendiksen (to (Norway) Molde)
27	GK	NOR	Lars Herlofsen (to (Norway) Sandefjord)

=== Viking ===
In: Note: Flags indicate national team as defined under FIFA eligibility rules; some limited exceptions apply. Players may hold more than one non-FIFA nationality.

No.	Pos.	Nation	Player
5	DF	USA	A. J. Soares (from (United States) New England Revolution)
6	DF	EST	Karol Mets (from (Estonia) Flora)
9	MF	NOR	Magne Hoseth (from (Norway) Stabæk)
19	FW	NGA	Suleiman Abdullahi (from (Nigeria) El-Kanemi Warriors)
24	GK	NOR	Pål Vestly Heigre (loan return from (Norway) Start)
26	FW	NGA	Samuel Adegbenro (from (Nigeria) Kwara United)
27	FW	NOR	Zymer Bytyqi (from (Austria) RB Salzburg)

Out: Note: Flags indicate national team as defined under FIFA eligibility rules; some limited exceptions apply. Players may hold more than one non-FIFA nationality.

No.	Pos.	Nation	Player
2	DF	NOR	Trond Erik Bertelsen (to (Norway) Sandnes Ulf)
5	DF	ISL	Sverrir Ingi Ingason (to (Belgium) Lokeren)
6	DF	NOR	Håkon Skogseid (to (Denmark) Odense)
13	MF	NOR	Christian Landu Landu (to (Norway) Tromsø)
24	GK	NOR	Pål Vestly Heigre (on loan to (Norway) Tromsø)
26	DF	NOR	Pål Fjelde (to (Norway) Bryne)
—	DF	NOR	Øyvind Nilsen (to (Norway) Nest-Sotra)

=== Vålerenga ===
In: Note: Flags indicate national team as defined under FIFA eligibility rules; some limited exceptions apply. Players may hold more than one non-FIFA nationality.

No.	Pos.	Nation	Player
4	DF	NOR	Jonatan Tollås Nation (from (Norway) Aalesund)
17	FW	NOR	Daniel Braaten (free agent)
22	FW	ISL	Elías Már Ómarsson (from (Iceland) Keflavík)
22	MF	CRC	Diego Calvo (loan return from (Sweden) IFK Göteborg)
23	MF	NOR	Sander Berge (from (Norway) Asker)
24	DF	NOR	Kjetil Wæhler (from (Sweden) IFK Göteborg)
26	FW	JAM	Deshorn Brown (from (United States) Colorado Rapids)
28	FW	NOR	Riki Alba (loan return from (Norway) Nest-Sotra)

Out: Note: Flags indicate national team as defined under FIFA eligibility rules; some limited exceptions apply. Players may hold more than one non-FIFA nationality.

No.	Pos.	Nation	Player
10	FW	ISL	Vidar Örn Kjartansson (to (China) Jiangsu Guoxin-Sainty)
15	DF	NOR	Max Bjørsvik (loan return to (Norway) Nest-Sotra)
22	MF	CRC	Diego Calvo (to (Costa Rica) Alajuelense)
24	DF	DEN	Nicolai Høgh (to (Denmark) AB)
25	MF	NOR	Markus Brændsrød (to (Norway) Lillestrøm)
26	DF	NOR	Simen Olafsen (to (Norway) Follo)
28	FW	NOR	Riki Alba (on loan to (Norway) Bærum)
34	GK	NOR	Gudmund Taksdal Kongshavn (to (Norway) Tromsø)
35	DF	NOR	Kamran Ali Iqbal (to (Norway) Nest-Sotra)
36	MF	NOR	Mathias Blårud (to (Norway) Strømmen)
43	MF	NOR	Fitim Kastrati (released)
—	DF	NOR	André Muri (retired)

=== Aalesund ===
In: Note: Flags indicate national team as defined under FIFA eligibility rules; some limited exceptions apply. Players may hold more than one non-FIFA nationality.

No.	Pos.	Nation	Player
3	DF	ISL	Daníel Leó Grétarsson (from (Iceland) Grindavik)
4	DF	FIN	Tero Mäntylä (from (Bulgaria) Ludogorets)
9	FW	SWE	Carl Björk (from (Norway) Brattvåg)
11	MF	ISL	Aron Elís Þrándarson (from (Iceland) Víkingur)
23	DF	NOR	Edvard Skagestad (from (Sweden) IFK Norrköping)

Out: Note: Flags indicate national team as defined under FIFA eligibility rules; some limited exceptions apply. Players may hold more than one non-FIFA nationality.

No.	Pos.	Nation	Player
4	DF	NOR	Jonatan Tollås Nation (to (Norway) Vålerenga)
15	DF	SWE	Daniel Arnefjord (released)
16	DF	NOR	Hugues Wembangomo (released)
17	DF	JAM	Demar Phillips (to (United States) Real Salt Lake)
18	FW	NOR	Christian Myklebust (released)
19	FW	NOR	Tor Hogne Aarøy (released)
23	MF	NOR	Fredrik Ulvestad (to (England) Burnley)
24	MF	MAR	El Mehdi Karnass (to (Morocco) FAR Rabat)

== 1. Divisjon ==
=== Brann ===
In: Note: Flags indicate national team as defined under FIFA eligibility rules; some limited exceptions apply. Players may hold more than one non-FIFA nationality.

No.	Pos.	Nation	Player
1	GK	USA	Alex Horwath (from (Sweden) Ljungskile)
7	MF	NOR	Kristoffer Larsen (loan return from (Norway) Hønefoss)
11	FW	CRC	Alejandro Castro (on loan from (Norway) Start)
12	GK	NOR	Kenneth Udjus (from (Norway) Lillestrøm)
15	DF	CRC	Bismar Acosta (from (Norway) Start)
33	DF	NOR	Amin Nouri (from (Norway) Start)

Out: Note: Flags indicate national team as defined under FIFA eligibility rules; some limited exceptions apply. Players may hold more than one non-FIFA nationality.

No.	Pos.	Nation	Player
2	DF	ISL	Birkir Már Sævarsson (to (Sweden) Hammarby IF)
5	DF	MKD	Daniel Mojsov (released)
7	MF	NOR	Hassan El Fakiri (retired)
12	GK	NOR	Øystein Øvretveit (on loan to (Norway) Nest-Sotra)
15	FW	SEN	Ibrahima Dramé (to (Norway) Hønefoss)
17	MF	SEN	Stéphane Badji (to (Turkey) İstanbul BB)
18	DF	SWE	Markus Jonsson (released)
20	FW	NOR	Håkon Lorentzen (on loan to (Norway) Åsane)
21	DF	NOR	Andreas Vindheim (to (Sweden) Malmö FF)
22	FW	NOR	Amin Askar (on loan to (Norway) Sarpsborg 08)

=== Bryne ===
In: Note: Flags indicate national team as defined under FIFA eligibility rules; some limited exceptions apply. Players may hold more than one non-FIFA nationality.

No.	Pos.	Nation	Player
5	DF	NOR	Tord Johnsen Salte (promoted)
6	DF	NOR	Pål Fjelde (from (Norway) Viking)
8	DF	NOR	Bjørnar Holmvik (from (Norway) Fredrikstad)
22	MF	NOR	Magnus Retsius Grødem (promoted)
25	MF	NOR	Andreas Breimyr (on loan from (England) Crystal Palace)

Out: Note: Flags indicate national team as defined under FIFA eligibility rules; some limited exceptions apply. Players may hold more than one non-FIFA nationality.

No.	Pos.	Nation	Player
5	DF	NOR	Tord Johnsen Salte (to (France) Lyon)
6	MF	LBN	Adnan Haidar (to (Norway) HamKam)
8	MF	NOR	Aleksander Midtsian (to (Norway) Rosseland)
9	DF	NOR	Tommy Eide Møster (to (Norway) Ålgard)
14	FW	NOR	Jim Johansen (loan return to (Norway) Bodø/Glimt)
25	MF	NOR	Andreas Breimyr (to (England) Crystal Palace)
32	MF	NOR	Andreas Ulland Andersen (to (Norway) Vard Haugesund)

=== Bærum ===
In: Note: Flags indicate national team as defined under FIFA eligibility rules; some limited exceptions apply. Players may hold more than one non-FIFA nationality.

No.	Pos.	Nation	Player
1	GK	FRA	Kris Devaux (from (Norway) Strindheim)
7	FW	GHA	Emmanuel Amarh (from (Norway) Moss)
8	MF	NOR	Morten Giæver (from (Norway) Ull/Kisa)
9	DF	NOR	Rasmus Isegran
10	MF	MNE	Vasko Kalezić (on loan from (Norway) Hønefoss)
11	FW	NOR	Riki Alba (on loan from (Norway) Vålerenga)
20	MF	CAN	Ethan Gage (from (Sweden) Nyköping)

Out: Note: Flags indicate national team as defined under FIFA eligibility rules; some limited exceptions apply. Players may hold more than one non-FIFA nationality.

No.	Pos.	Nation	Player
7	MF	NOR	Daniel Berg (to (Norway) Kristiansund)
8	DF	NOR	Lars Rønning Sandbu (retired)
17	MF	NOR	Tokmac Nguen (loan return to (Norway) Strømsgodset)

=== Follo ===
In: Note: Flags indicate national team as defined under FIFA eligibility rules; some limited exceptions apply. Players may hold more than one non-FIFA nationality.

No.	Pos.	Nation	Player
17	FW	NOR	Akinbola Akinyemi (from (Norway) Kjelsås)
21	FW	NOR	Didrik Sereba (from (Norway) Lyn)
22	GK	NOR	Jonathan Rasheed (from (Sweden) Ljungskile)
26	DF	NOR	Simen Olafsen (from (Norway) Vålerenga)

Out: Note: Flags indicate national team as defined under FIFA eligibility rules; some limited exceptions apply. Players may hold more than one non-FIFA nationality.

No.	Pos.	Nation	Player
7	FW	NOR	Fitim Azemi (to (Norway) Bodø/Glimt)
13	DF	NOR	Henrik Nøkleby (to (Norway) Ski)

=== Fredrikstad ===
In: Note: Flags indicate national team as defined under FIFA eligibility rules; some limited exceptions apply. Players may hold more than one non-FIFA nationality.

No.	Pos.	Nation	Player
4	DF	CAN	Adam Straith (free agent)
5	MF	SWE	Amin Nazari (on loan from (Sweden) Malmö)
6	DF	SWE	Johan Hammar (on loan from (Sweden) Malmö)
14	FW	SLV	Rafael Burgos (from (Austria) SV Ried)
17	FW	NOR	Henrik Kjelsrud Johansen (on loan from (Norway) Odd)
69	DF	FRA	Loïc Abenzoar (from (Norway) Hønefoss)

Out: Note: Flags indicate national team as defined under FIFA eligibility rules; some limited exceptions apply. Players may hold more than one non-FIFA nationality.

No.	Pos.	Nation	Player
2	DF	NOR	Haitam Aleesami (to (Sweden) IFK Göteborg)
5	DF	NOR	Bjørnar Holmvik (to (Norway) Bryne)
13	FW	NOR	Robert Stene (to (Norway) Ranheim)
16	FW	SEN	Momo Gueye (released)
26	DF	NOR	Lars Grorud (to (Norway) Fram Larvik)
—	MF	NOR	Magnus Hart (to (Norway) Sarpsborg 08)
—	FW	NOR	Leonard Getz (to (Norway) Sarpsborg 08)

=== Hødd ===
In: Note: Flags indicate national team as defined under FIFA eligibility rules; some limited exceptions apply. Players may hold more than one non-FIFA nationality.

No.	Pos.	Nation	Player
3	DF	NOR	Christoffer Aasberg (from (Norway) Byåsen)
9	FW	NOR	Magnus Myklebust (from (Norway) Kongsvinger)
11	FW	NOR	Michael Karlsen (from (Norway) Rødde)
14	MF	NOR	Torbjørn Kallevåg (from (Norway) Vard Haugesund)

Out: Note: Flags indicate national team as defined under FIFA eligibility rules; some limited exceptions apply. Players may hold more than one non-FIFA nationality.

No.	Pos.	Nation	Player
11	FW	ENG	Robin Shroot (to (Norway) Sogndal)
14	MF	NOR	Henrik Grimstad (to (Norway) Bergsøy)
17	FW	CRO	Franjo Tepurić (to (Norway) Bergsøy)
—	MF	NOR	Tobias Vibe (to (Norway) Tromsdalen)
—	DF	NOR	Victor Grodås (to (Norway) Sogndal)

=== Hønefoss ===
In: Note: Flags indicate national team as defined under FIFA eligibility rules; some limited exceptions apply. Players may hold more than one non-FIFA nationality.

No.	Pos.	Nation	Player
3	DF	NAM	Miguel Hamutenya (from (Norway) Strømmen)
9	FW	SEN	Malick Mané (on loan from (Sweden) IFK Göteborg)
15	FW	SEN	Ibrahima Dramé (from (Norway) Brann)
24	GK	NOR	Terjei Aasen Omenås (from (Norway) Lyn)
31	MF	NGA	Ugonna Anyora (from (Norway) Haugesund)
32	DF	NOR	Thomas Braaten (from (Norway) Bodø/Glimt)

Out: Note: Flags indicate national team as defined under FIFA eligibility rules; some limited exceptions apply. Players may hold more than one non-FIFA nationality.

No.	Pos.	Nation	Player
3	DF	DEN	Henrik Kildentoft (to (Denmark) Vendsyssel FF)
6	DF	ISL	Kristján Örn Sigurðsson (retired)
9	MF	NOR	Mats André Kaland (to (Sweden) Varbergs BoIS)
10	FW	FIN	Roope Riski (to (Norway) Haugesund)
14	MF	NOR	Kristoffer Larsen (loan return to (Norway) Brann)
19	MF	NOR	Kamer Qaka (to (Norway) Sarpsborg 08)
25	GK	NOR	Alexander Pedersen (to (Norway) Kongsvinger)
69	DF	FRA	Loïc Abenzoar (to (Norway) Fredrikstad)
70	MF	MNE	Vasko Kalezić (on loan to (Norway) Bærum)

=== Jerv ===
In: Note: Flags indicate national team as defined under FIFA eligibility rules; some limited exceptions apply. Players may hold more than one non-FIFA nationality.

No.	Pos.	Nation	Player
2	DF	NOR	Glenn Andersen (from (Norway) Start)
5	DF	NOR	Nils Petter Andersen (from (Norway) Fløy)
10	FW	NOR	Christoffer Myhre (from (Norway) Fløy)
17	MF	GHA	Fuseini Mohammed (from (Russia) FC Terek Grozny)
69	FW	NOR	Alexander Lind (from (Norway) Start)
99	FW	NOR	Ohi Omoijuanfo (from (Norway) Lillestrøm)

Out: Note: Flags indicate national team as defined under FIFA eligibility rules; some limited exceptions apply. Players may hold more than one non-FIFA nationality.

No.	Pos.	Nation	Player
2	DF	NOR	Sven Fredrik Stray (to (Norway) Arendal)
9	FW	NOR	Wilhelm Pepa (to (Norway) Arendal)

=== Kristiansund ===
In: Note: Flags indicate national team as defined under FIFA eligibility rules; some limited exceptions apply. Players may hold more than one non-FIFA nationality.

No.	Pos.	Nation	Player
1	GK	NOR	Alexander Hovdevik (from (Norway) Rødde)
3	MF	NOR	Stian Rode Gregersen (on loan from (Norway) Molde)
7	MF	NOR	Daniel Berg (from (Norway) Bærum)
13	FW	NOR	Torbjørn Agdestein (on loan from (Norway) Haugesund)
17	FW	SEN	Aliou Coly (from (Norway) Molde)
18	MF	NOR	Marius Hagen (from (Sweden) Husqvarna)
20	FW	NGA	George White (from (Norway) Strømmen)
27	FW	NOR	Dawda Leigh (free agent)
28	FW	NOR	Mahmoud El Haj (from (Norway) Strømmen)

Out: Note: Flags indicate national team as defined under FIFA eligibility rules; some limited exceptions apply. Players may hold more than one non-FIFA nationality.

No.	Pos.	Nation	Player
10	MF	SWE	Liridon Kalludra (to (Norway) Sarpsborg 08)
18	FW	NOR	Jean Mendy (to (Norway) Sandefjord)
55	MF	GHA	Aziz Idris (to (Norway) HamKam)

=== Levanger ===
In: Note: Flags indicate national team as defined under FIFA eligibility rules; some limited exceptions apply. Players may hold more than one non-FIFA nationality.

No.	Pos.	Nation	Player
11	FW	NOR	Bendik Bye (from (Norway) Ranheim)
16	MF	NOR	Ørjan Hopen (from (Norway) Sogndal)
18	FW	NOR	Vegard Braaten (from (Norway) Bodø/Glimt)
25	MF	NOR	Bent Sørmo (on loan from (Norway) Rosenborg)
26	DF	NOR	Per Verner Rønning (on loan from (Norway) Rosenborg)

Out: Note: Flags indicate national team as defined under FIFA eligibility rules; some limited exceptions apply. Players may hold more than one non-FIFA nationality.

No.	Pos.	Nation	Player

=== Nest-Sotra ===
In: Note: Flags indicate national team as defined under FIFA eligibility rules; some limited exceptions apply. Players may hold more than one non-FIFA nationality.

No.	Pos.	Nation	Player
1	GK	NOR	Øystein Øvretveit (on loan from (Norway) Brann)
4	DF	NOR	Max Bjørsvik (loan return from (Norway) Vålerenga)
11	FW	NOR	Marius Wichne (from (Norway) Fana)
13	MF	NOR	Øyvind Nilsen (from (Norway) Viking)
18	DF	NOR	Kamran Ali Iqbal (from (Norway) Vålerenga)

Out: Note: Flags indicate national team as defined under FIFA eligibility rules; some limited exceptions apply. Players may hold more than one non-FIFA nationality.

No.	Pos.	Nation	Player
1	GK	ESP	Martín Sánchez Olsen (to (Norway) Åsane)
7	MF	ESP	Damian Sánchez Olsen (to (Norway) Åsane)
16	DF	NOR	Kevin Duré (to (Norway) Åsane)
18	FW	NOR	Riki Alba (loan return to (Norway) Vålerenga)
19	MF	NOR	Kjetil Kalve (to (Norway) Åsane)
25	MF	NOR	Ørjan Hopen (loan return to (Norway) Sogndal)

=== Ranheim ===
In: Note: Flags indicate national team as defined under FIFA eligibility rules; some limited exceptions apply. Players may hold more than one non-FIFA nationality.

No.	Pos.	Nation	Player
2	DF	NOR	Aslak Fonn Witry (on loan from (Norway) Rosenborg)
9	FW	NOR	Torgil Gjertsen (from (Norway) Strindheim)
11	FW	NOR	Ørjan Børmark-By (from (Norway) HamKam)
12	GK	SWE	Andreas Lindberg (from (Sweden) IFK Norrköping)
13	FW	NOR	Robert Stene (from (Norway) Fredrikstad)

Out: Note: Flags indicate national team as defined under FIFA eligibility rules; some limited exceptions apply. Players may hold more than one non-FIFA nationality.

No.	Pos.	Nation	Player
3	DF	NOR	Christian Eggen Rismark (on loan to (Norway) Rødde)
11	FW	NOR	Bendik Bye (to (Norway) Levanger)
20	FW	NOR	Torgil Gjertsen (loan return to (Norway) Strindheim)
23	MF	NOR	Gjermund Åsen (to (Norway) Tromsø)

=== Sandnes Ulf ===
In: Note: Flags indicate national team as defined under FIFA eligibility rules; some limited exceptions apply. Players may hold more than one non-FIFA nationality.

No.	Pos.	Nation	Player
6	DF	NOR	Trond Erik Bertelsen (from (Norway) Viking)
7	MF	USA	Paul Torres (from (Sweden) Landskrona)
10	MF	DEN	Tonny Brochmann (from (Norway) Sogndal)
11	FW	SWE	Pontus Engblom (from (Norway) Haugesund)
14	DF	DEN	Nicolai Geersen (from (Norway) Egersund)
25	DF	NOR	Vegard Skjørestad (from (Norway) Hana)

Out: Note: Flags indicate national team as defined under FIFA eligibility rules; some limited exceptions apply. Players may hold more than one non-FIFA nationality.

No.	Pos.	Nation	Player
2	DF	ISL	Eiður Sigurbjörnsson (loan return to (Sweden) Örebro SK)
5	DF	SWE	Edier Frejd (released)
6	DF	NOR	Avni Pepa (to (Albania) Flamurtari Vlorë)
7	MF	NOR	Henrik Furebotn (to (Norway) Bodø/Glimt)
10	FW	CRC	Randall Brenes (loan return to (Costa Rica) Cartaginés)
11	FW	CHI	Diego Rubio (loan return to (Portugal) Sporting)
15	FW	ISL	Hannes Sigurðsson (to (Germany) SSV Jahn Regensburg)
20	MF	GAM	Tijan Jaiteh (released)
24	MF	NOR	Fredrik Midtsjø (loan return to (Norway) Rosenborg)

=== Sogndal ===
In: Note: Flags indicate national team as defined under FIFA eligibility rules; some limited exceptions apply. Players may hold more than one non-FIFA nationality.

No.	Pos.	Nation	Player
5	DF	NOR	Victor Grodås (from (Norway) Hødd)
10	FW	ENG	Robin Shroot (from (Norway) Hødd)
11	FW	NOR	Jim Johansen (on loan from (Norway) Bodø/Glimt)
12	GK	NOR	Christian Sukke (on loan from (Norway) Sarpsborg 08)
22	MF	NOR	Lars Christian Kjemhus (from (Norway) Fana)

Out: Note: Flags indicate national team as defined under FIFA eligibility rules; some limited exceptions apply. Players may hold more than one non-FIFA nationality.

No.	Pos.	Nation	Player
5	DF	ISL	Hjörtur Logi Valgarðsson (to (Sweden) Örebro SK)
12	GK	NOR	Kenneth Udjus (loan return to (Norway) Lillestrøm)
14	DF	SWE	Tom Söderberg (loan return to (Sweden) IF Elfsborg)
19	FW	NGA	Edward Ofere (to (Scotland) Inverness Calesonian Thistle)
21	GK	NOR	Leif Lysne (released)
22	FW	NOR	Tim André Nilsen (to (Norway) Mjøndalen)
23	MF	DEN	Tonny Brochmann (to (Norway) Sandnes)
27	MF	NOR	Kristoffer Nesse Stephensen (to (Norway) Åsane)
—	MF	NOR	Ørjan Hopen (to (Norway) Levanger, previously on loan at (Norway) Nest-Sotra)
—	MF	NOR	Martin Wilhelmsen Trøen (to (Norway) Eidsvold, previously on loan at (Norway) HamKam)

=== Strømmen ===
In: Note: Flags indicate national team as defined under FIFA eligibility rules; some limited exceptions apply. Players may hold more than one non-FIFA nationality.

No.	Pos.	Nation	Player
1	GK	CAN	Simon Thomas (from (England) Newport County)
18	MF	NOR	Mathias Blårud (from (Norway) Vålerenga)
23	DF	NOR	Pål Steffen Andresen (from (Norway) Ull/Kisa)

Out: Note: Flags indicate national team as defined under FIFA eligibility rules; some limited exceptions apply. Players may hold more than one non-FIFA nationality.

No.	Pos.	Nation	Player
1	GK	USA	David Bingham (loan return to (United States) San Jose Earthquakes)
3	DF	NAM	Miguel Hamutenya (to (Norway) Hønefoss)
9	FW	NOR	Mahmoud El Haj (to (Norway) Kristiansund)
15	DF	NOR	Kim Skogsrud (loan return to (Norway) Sandefjord)
18	MF	SRB	Igor Mirčeta (retired)
20	FW	NGA	George White (to (Norway) Kristiansund)
25	GK	SWE	Samuel Dirscher (released)

=== Åsane ===
In: Note: Flags indicate national team as defined under FIFA eligibility rules; some limited exceptions apply. Players may hold more than one non-FIFA nationality.

No.	Pos.	Nation	Player
8	MF	NOR	Kjetil Kalve (from (Norway) Nest-Sotra)
10	FW	NOR	Senai Hagos (from (Norway) Fyllingsdalen)
11	MF	ESP	Damian Sánchez Olsen (from (Norway) Nest-Sotra)
14	FW	NOR	Magnus Nyborg (from (Norway) Lambertseter)
16	DF	NOR	Kevin Duré (from (Norway) Nest-Sotra)
17	DF	NOR	Sverre Bjørkkjær (on loan from (Norway) Haugesund)
18	MF	NOR	Erlend Grov (from (Norway) Trott)
19	MF	NOR	Simen Lassen (from (Norway) Brann)
21	FW	NOR	Joachim Soltvedt (from (Norway) Brann)
29	MF	NOR	Kristoffer Nesse Stephensen (from (Norway) Sogndal)
30	FW	NOR	Håkon Lorentzen (on loan from (Norway) Brann)
91	GK	ESP	Martín Sánchez Olsen (from (Norway) Nest-Sotra)

Out: Note: Flags indicate national team as defined under FIFA eligibility rules; some limited exceptions apply. Players may hold more than one non-FIFA nationality.

No.	Pos.	Nation	Player
9	MF	NOR	Nicolai Misje (to (Norway) Varegg)
19	MF	NOR	Sindre Flaa (to (Norway) Lysekloster)
—	FW	NOR	Tommy Gauseth (to (Norway) Lysekloster)
—	MF	NOR	Sindre Tjelmeland (released)
