= Kristin Haugstad =

Norwegian footballer (born 1994)

Personal information
- Date of birth: 17 January 1994 (age 32)
- Position: Forward

Team information
- Current team: Øvrevoll Hosle
- Number: 24

Youth career
- Nesodden

Senior career*
Years	Team	Apps	(Gls)
2011–2014	Vålerenga	51	(12)
2014–2017	La Salle Explorers		
2015	→ Nesodden (loan)		
2016	→ Vålerenga (loan)	4	(0)
2017	→ Amazon Grimstad (loan)	7	(3)
2018	IFK Kalmar	14	(1)
2019	Amazon Grimstad	14	(5)
2020–2021	Lyn	24	(1)
2020	→ Amazon Grimstad (loan)	8	(5)
2022	Slavia Prague		
2023	Røa	26	(4)
2024–	Øvrevoll Hosle	8	(1)

International career^{‡}
2009	Norway U15	2	(0)
2010	Norway U16	9	(3)
2011	Norway U17	4	(2)
2011–2013	Norway U19	9	(0)
- * Club domestic league appearances and goals as of 30 May 2024 ‡ National team caps and goals as of 30 May 2024

Kristin Haugstad (born 17 January 1994) is a Norwegian footballer who plays as a forward for Øvrevoll Hosle.

== Life ==
Haugstad hails from Oksval at Nesodden and is a twin sister of Eirik Haugstad. They both participated in athletics during their youth before committing to football.

Haugstad uses a hearing aid, having had hearing impairment since the age of 22.

== Career ==
Kristin Haugstad made her debut for Vålerenga while they played in the 1. divisjon, winning promotion to the 2012 Toppserien. She was a regular in 2012 and 2013 before leaving in 2014 to attend La Salle University and play for the La Salle Explorers.

During the college off-season, she represented her childhood club Nesodden in the summer of 2015, Vålerenga in 2016 and Amazon Grimstad in 2017. Graduating from La Salle in December 2017, she joined IFK Kalmar for the 2018 Damallsvenskan.

Following a return to Norway and Amazon Grimstad, she joined Lyn in 2020. In 2020 she joined Amazon Grimstad for a third time, on loan from Lyn. Spending 2022 with Slavia Prague, she helped win the double in the Czech Republic. Nonetheless, she returned to Norway in 2023 to play for her third Oslo-based club, Røa.
