= Giorgi Gorozia =

Russian and Georgian footballer (born 1995)

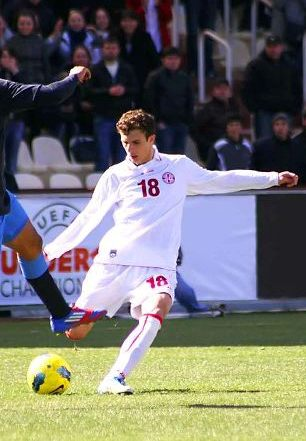

Personal information
- Date of birth: 26 March 1995 (age 31)
- Place of birth: Samara, Russia
- Height: 1.80 m (5 ft 11 in)
- Position: Midfielder

Youth career
- Lokomotivi Tbilisi

Senior career*
Years	Team	Apps	(Gls)
2011–2014	Locomotive Tbilisi	54	(18)
2013–2014	→ Torpedo Kutaisi (loan)	14	(0)
2014–2017	Stabæk	53	(4)
2017	Zira	5	(0)
2017	Locomotive Tbilisi	16	(2)
2018	Hibernians	7	(0)
2018	RoPS	13	(1)
2019–2020	Locomotive Tbilisi	14	(0)
2021	Dynamo Bryansk	6	(0)

International career
2011–2012	Georgia U17	9	(0)
2013–2014	Georgia U19	5	(0)
2015–2016	Georgia U21	3	(0)
- * Club domestic league appearances and goals as of 15 May 2021

Giorgi Gorozia (Georgian: გიორგი გოროზია; born 26 March 1995) is a Georgian footballer who plays as a midfielder.

== Career ==
=== Club ===
Gorozia started his career at Lokomotivi Tbilisi, where he had a loan spell at FC Torpedo Kutaisi before moving to Norwegian club Stabæk Fotball on a three-year contract in August 2014. Gorozia made his début for Stabæk in a 1–1 home draw against Viking on 19 October 2014 in the Tippeligaen.

On 17 February 2017, Gorozia signed for Zira FK until the end of the 2016–17 season.

On 25 July 2018, Gorozia signed for RoPS.

=== International ===
Gorozia has represented Georgia at under-17, under-19 and under-21 level. Even though he was born in Russia and possesses Russian citizenship, that makes him ineligible for the Russia national football team and therefore he is considered a foreign player when he plays for Russian clubs.

== Career statistics ==
As of match played 26 November 2017

Appearances and goals by club, season and competition
Club	Season	League			National Cup		Continental		Other		Total	
Club	Season	Division	Apps	Goals	Apps	Goals	Apps	Goals	Apps	Goals	Apps	Goals
Locomotive Tbilisi	2011–12	Pirveli Liga	19	5	1	0	-		-		20	5
Locomotive Tbilisi	2012–13	Pirveli Liga	26	7	2	1	-		-		28	8
Locomotive Tbilisi	2013–14	Pirveli Liga	9	6	0	0	-		-		9	6
Locomotive Tbilisi	Total		54	18	3	1	-	-	-	-	57	19
Torpedo Kutaisi (loan)	2013–14	Umaglesi Liga	14	0	2	0	2	0	-		18	0
Stabæk	2014	Tippeligaen	4	0	1	0	-		-		5	0
Stabæk	2015	Tippeligaen	26	1	6	1	-		-		32	2
Stabæk	2016	Tippeligaen	23	3	4	1	2	0	0	0	29	4
Stabæk	Total		53	4	11	2	2	0	0	0	66	6
Zira	2016–17	Azerbaijan Premier League	5	0	0	0	-		-		5	0
Locomotive Tbilisi	2017	Erovnuli Liga	16	2	0	0	-		-		16	2
Hibernians	2017–18	Maltese Premier League	7	0	2	0	–		–		9	0
RoPS	2018	Veikkausliiga	13	1	0	0	–		–		13	1
Locomotive Tbilisi	2019	Erovnuli Liga	13	0	1	0	–		–		0	
Dynamo Bryansk	2020–21	Russian First League	6	0	0	0	–		–		6	0
Career total			181	25	19	3	4	0	0	0	204	28
