= Mynor Escoe =

Costa Rican footballer (born 1991)

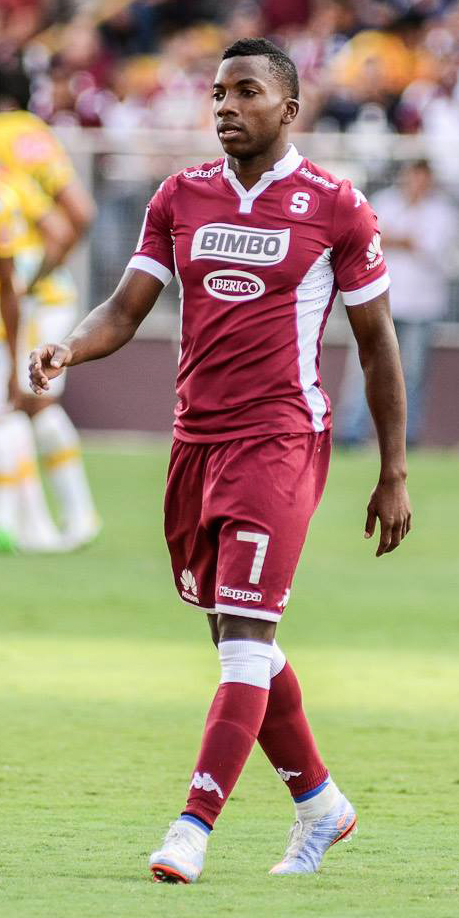

Personal information
- Full name: Mynor Javier Escoe Miller
- Date of birth: 6 April 1991 (age 35)
- Place of birth: San José, Costa Rica
- Height: 1.74 m (5 ft 9 in)
- Position: Winger

Team information
- Current team: Limón

Senior career*
| Years | Team | Apps | (Gls) |
| 2010–2017 | Saprissa | 84 | (23) |
| 2010 | → Brujas (loan) | 2 | (0) |
| 2010–2011 | → Lorient B (loan) | 16 | (1) |
| 2012–2013 | → Charleroi (loan) | 12 | (0) |
| 2016 | → Stabæk (loan) | 6 | (0) |
| 2017 | UTC | 9 | (2) |
| 2017–2018 | Tampico Madero | 13 | (1) |
| 2019 | Herediano | 19 | (3) |
| 2019 | San Carlos | 15 | (1) |
| 2020 | Mineros de Guayana | 4 | (0) |
| 2021– | Limón | 12 | (1) |

International career
| 2011 | Costa Rica U20 | 10 | (4) |
- * Club domestic league appearances and goals as of 18:52, 7 June 2021 (UTC)

Mynor Javier Escoe Miller (born 6 April 1991) is a Costa Rican footballer for club Limón.
