= Eirik Haugstad =

Norwegian footballer (born 1994)

Personal information
- Date of birth: 17 January 1994 (age 32)
- Place of birth: Norway
- Height: 1.79 m (5 ft 10 1/2 in)
- Position: Midfielder

Team information
- Current team: Nesodden
- Number: 25

Youth career
- –2010: Nesodden
- 2010–2012: Lyn
- 2012–2013: Stabæk Fotball

Senior career*
Years	Team	Apps	(Gls)
2011	Lyn	5	(0)
2013–2016	Stabæk Fotball	44	(0)
2016–2017	FK Jerv	20	(5)
2018–2022	Lyn	73	(18)
2024–	Nesodden	6	(1)
- * Club domestic league appearances and goals as of 12 September 2024

Eirik Haugstad (born 17 January 1994) is a Norwegian football midfielder who currently plays for Nesodden IF.

== Career ==
He hails from Oksval at Nesodden and played youth football for Nesodden IF, but transferred to Lyn when enrolling in the Norwegian College of Elite Sport. When the elite branch ("FK Lyn") went bankrupt in 2010, he joined the club's amateur branch ("Lyn Fotball"). In 2011 Lyn Fotball played in the 4. Division, the fifth tier of Norwegian football, and Haugstad played four senior games there. He mostly played for the junior team, and in 2012 he joined Stabæk to have the same role there. He did however make his first-team debut for Stabæk against Elverum in the 1. divisjon in 2013, his last year as a junior.

In 2014, he was a part of Stabæk's senior squad. His debut in the Norwegian Premier League was unprecedented. Stabæk's two goalkeepers were away for the FIFA World Cup (Sayouba Mandé) and suspended for a send-off (Borger Thomas). Stabæk chose to field their former goalkeeper, now retired Espen Isaksen. Not having a professional contract, Isaksen was only allowed to play a single game and was not allowed in the starting eleven. Thus, Eirik Haugstad started as Stabæk's goalkeeper and was substituted for Isaksen after only three seconds of play. Haugstad later made his first-tier debut on his own merits, as a substitute against Vålerenga in July 2014.

In the summer of 2016 Haugstad OBOS-ligaen side FK Jerv. In the fall of 2016, Jerv faced Haugstad's former club Stabæk in a promotion/relegation playoff. Haugstad scored the only goal in Jerv's 1–0 home victory, but they lost 0–2 on away ground. Ahead of the 2018 season Haugstad went down two tiers to sign for fourth-tier Lyn Fotball.

Haugstad was a talented track and field athlete, who clocked personal best times of 11.37 in the 100 metres (2011), 22.63 in the 200 metres (2012), 49.73 in the 400 metres (2011) and 2.00 in the high jump (2012, indoors). His twin sister Kristin Haugstad played in Toppserien for Vålerenga, later moving to Damallsvenskan.
