= Cole Grossman =

American soccer player

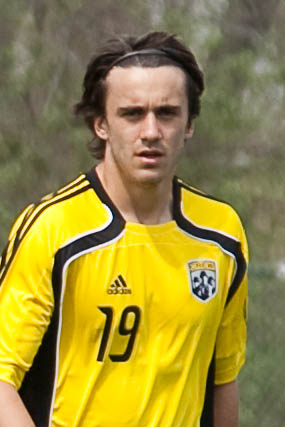

Personal information
- Full name: Nicholas Holland Grossman
- Date of birth: April 10, 1989 (age 37)
- Place of birth: St. Louis, Missouri, U.S.
- Height: 6 ft 0 in (1.83 m)
- Position: Midfielder

Youth career
- 2007–2010: Duke Blue Devils

College career
Years	Team	Apps	(Gls)
2007–2010	Duke Blue Devils	71	(25)

Senior career*
Years	Team	Apps	(Gls)
2009	Cary Clarets	12	(4)
2011–2012	Columbus Crew	12	(1)
2013–2014	Real Salt Lake	21	(1)
2015–2016	Stabæk	51	(5)
- * Club domestic league appearances and goals as of 30 November 2016

Nicholas Holland "Cole" Grossman (born April 10, 1989) is an American former soccer player who most recently played for Stabæk in the Norwegian Eliteserien.

== Career ==
=== College and amateur ===
Grossman is a product of Duke University, where he appeared in 70 career games (starting 59) and achieved 25 goals and 24 assists. During his time with Duke, Grossman was a two-time NSCAA All-South Region team pick (2nd in 2009 and 1st in 2010) and was named in the All-ACC teams twice (2nd 2009 and 1st in 2010). He was named a Soccer America and TopDrawerSoccer.com All-American in 2010.

During his college years, Grossman also played with the Cary Clarets of the USL Premier Development League during their 2009 season.

=== Professional ===
On January 14, 2011, Grossman was drafted in the second round (28th overall) in the 2011 MLS SuperDraft by Columbus Crew. He made his professional debut on February 22, 2011, in the first leg of the Crew's CONCACAF Champions League quarter-final series against Real Salt Lake.

On November 19, 2012, Grossman was selected by Real Salt Lake in the waiver draft, after being released by Columbus earlier that day.

After two seasons with Salt Lake, in January 2015 Grossman signed with Stabæk in Norway's top league, the Tippeligaen. Grossman made his debut with Stabæk on 6 April 2015. He left the club on 1 January 2017.

== Career statistics ==
=== Club ===
As of match played 6 November 2016

Appearances and goals by club, season and competition
Club	Season	League			National Cup		Continental		Total	
Club	Season	Division	Apps	Goals	Apps	Goals	Apps	Goals	Apps	Goals
Columbus Crew	2011	Major League Soccer	2	0	1	1	2	0	5	1
Columbus Crew	2012	Major League Soccer	10	1	1	0	-		11	1
Columbus Crew	Total		12	1	2	0	2	0	16	2
Real Salt Lake	2014	Major League Soccer	5	1	0	0	-		5	1
Real Salt Lake	2014	Major League Soccer	17	0	1	0	-		18	0
Real Salt Lake	Total		22	1	1	0	-	-	23	1
Stabæk	2015	Tippeligaen	28	4	5	1	-		33	5
Stabæk	2016	Tippeligaen	23	1	2	0	2	0	27	1
Stabæk	Total		51	5	7	1	2	0	60	6
Career total			85	7	10	2	4	0	99	9
