= Daniel Granli =

Norwegian footballer (born 1994)

Personal information
- Full name: Daniel Fredrik Granli
- Date of birth: 1 May 1994 (age 32)
- Place of birth: Bærum, Norway
- Height: 1.88 m (6 ft 2 in)
- Position: Centre-back

Team information
- Current team: IF Elfsborg
- Number: 4

Youth career
- Lier
- Bærum
- –2012: Stabæk

Senior career*
Years	Team	Apps	(Gls)
2013–2019	Stabæk	119	(1)
2019–2020	AIK	24	(0)
2020	→ AaB (loan)	11	(0)
2021–2023	AaB	65	(3)
2023–2024	ADO Den Haag	18	(0)
2025–	IF Elfsborg	11	(0)

International career^{‡}
2014	Norway U21	1	(0)
2020	Norway	1	(0)
- * Club domestic league appearances and goals as of 11 November 2025 ‡ National team caps and goals as of 18 November 2020

Daniel Fredrik Granli (born 1 May 1994) is a Norwegian footballer who plays for Swedish club IF Elfsborg. Historically a right back, since 2018 he is mainly a centre-back.

== Career ==
=== Club career ===
He is a son of former goalkeeper Espen Granli, and hails from Lier. After starting his youth career in Lier he went on to Bærum and Stabæk. He made his senior team debut in April 2013, when Stabæk was languishing in the 1. divisjon, in a match against Kongsvinger. He subsequently signed the professional contract. Stabæk was promoted, and he made his first-tier debut in March 2014 against Sogndal.

On 28 January 2019 Granli signed with Swedish AIK on a four-year contract. However, he was loaned out to Danish Superliga club AaB on 3 September 2020 for the rest of the year with an option to buy. On 6 January 2021 AaB confirmed, that they had triggered the buying option.

On 14 August 2023 he signed a two-year contract with ADO Den Haag in the Netherlands. On 28 December 2024, ADO Den Haag announced that Daniel Granli's contract, originally set to expire on 30 June 2025, would be terminated by mutual agreement on 31 December 2024.

On 26 February 2025, Granli signed with IF Elfsborg in Sweden until the end of 2025.

== Career statistics ==
=== Club ===
As of match played 19 November 2024

Appearances and goals by club, season and competition
Club	Season	League			National Cup		Europe		Total	
Club	Season	Division	Apps	Goals	Apps	Goals	Apps	Goals	Apps	Goals
Stabæk	2013	1. divisjon	16	1	2	0	—		18	1
Stabæk	2014	Tippeligaen	21	0	3	0	—		24	0
Stabæk	2015	Tippeligaen	22	0	5	2	—		27	2
Stabæk	2016	Tippeligaen	17	0	2	0	—		19	0
Stabæk	2017	Eliteserien	14	0	5	0	—		19	0
Stabæk	2018	Eliteserien	29	0	3	0	—		32	0
Stabæk	Total		119	1	20	2	—		139	3
AIK	2019	Allsvenskan	11	0	5	0	7	0	23	0
AIK	2020	Allsvenskan	13	0	2	0	—		15	0
AIK	Total		24	0	7	0	7	0	38	0
AaB	2020–21	Danish Superliga	27	0	0	0	—		27	0
AaB	2021–22	Danish Superliga	28	0	3	0	—		31	0
AaB	2022–23	Danish Superliga	22	2	6	0	—		28	2
AaB	2023–24	Danish 1st Division	1	0	0	0	—		1	0
AaB	Total		78	2	9	0	—		87	2
ADO Den Haag	2023–24	Eerste Divisie	9	0	0	0	—		9	0
ADO Den Haag	2024–25	Eerste Divisie	9	0	0	0	—		9	0
ADO Den Haag	Total		18	0	0	0	—		18	2
Career total			239	3	36	2	7	0	282	5

=== International ===
Appearances and goals by national team and year
National team	Year	Apps	Goals
2020	1	0	
Total		1	0
