= Muhamed Keita =

Norwegian footballer (born 1990)

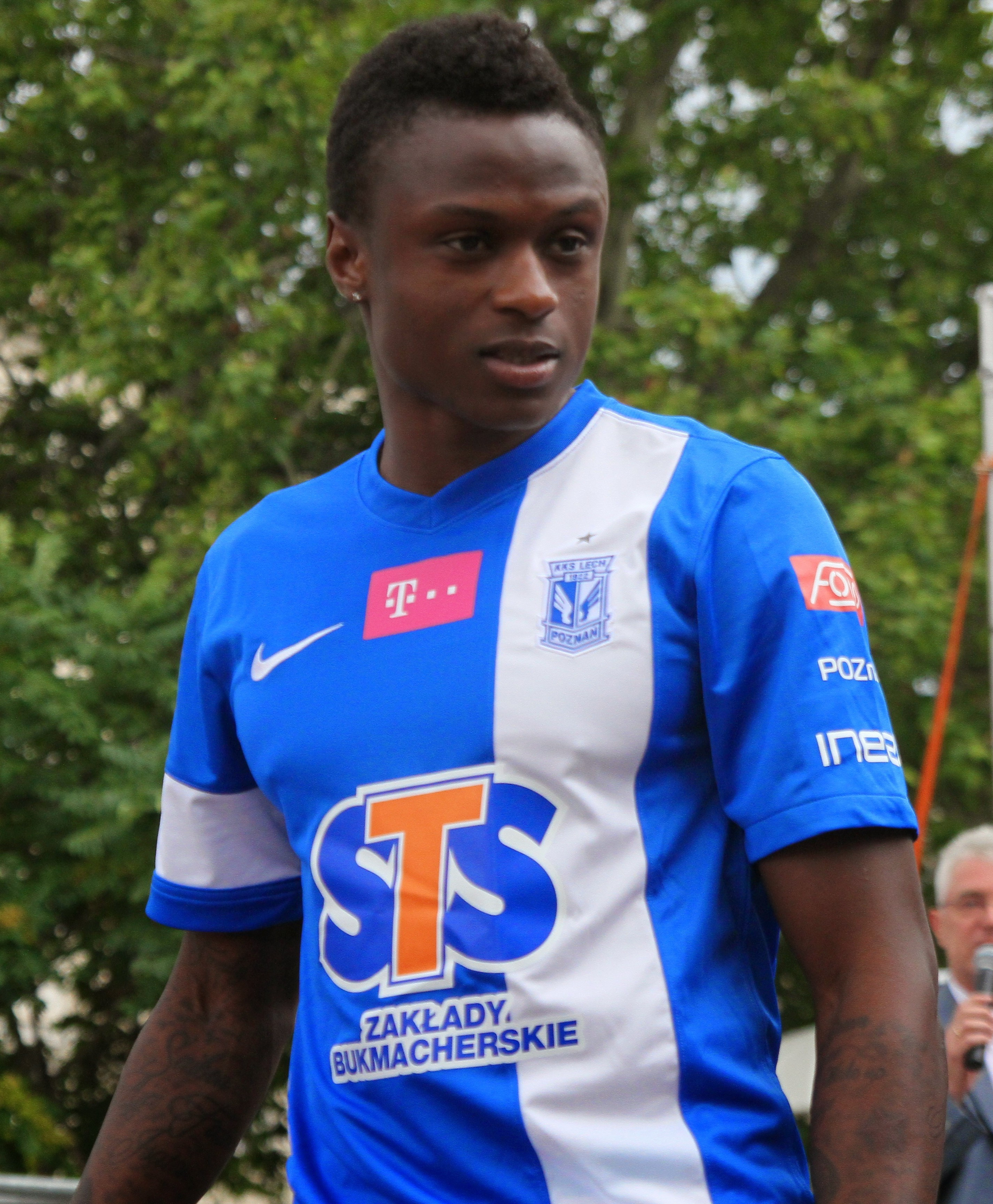
- Keita in 2014

Personal information
- Full name: Muhamed Maudo Keita
- Date of birth: 2 September 1990 (age 36)
- Place of birth: Banjul, Gambia
- Height: 1.70 m (5 ft 7 in)
- Positions: Forward; winger

Youth career
- Drafn
- 2006–2008: Strømsgodset

Senior career*
Years	Team	Apps	(Gls)
2008–2014	Strømsgodset	125	(18)
2014–2017	Lech Poznań	19	(2)
2015	Lech Poznań II	1	(1)
2015	→ Stabæk (loan)	11	(2)
2016	→ Strømsgodset (loan)	13	(4)
2016	→ Stabæk (loan)	9	(3)
2017	→ Vålerenga (loan)	6	(1)
2017–2018	New York Red Bulls	6	(0)
2019	Strømsgodset	16	(3)
2020	Ohod	0	(0)
2021–2022	Gamle Oslo	11	(2)
2023	Steinberg	3	(1)

International career
2008	Norway U18	9	(0)
2010–2011	Norway U21	4	(1)
2012–2015	Norway U23	5	(0)
- * Club domestic league appearances and goals as of 10 October 2024

Muhamed Keita (born 2 September 1990) is a Norwegian former professional footballer who played as a forward or winger.

== Club career ==
=== Early career ===
Born in Banjul, Gambia, Keita began his career with Norwegian side Drafn. While with Drafn he caught the attention of Strømsgodset, joining the club's youth system in 2006.

=== Strømsgodset ===
Keita made his first team debut for Strømsgodset away against Brann, and followed this up with some notable performances: he scored a hat-trick after coming off the bench against Pors Grenland in the Norwegian Cup, and was impressive against Viking in the final match of the 2008 season. On 26 April 2009 Keita scored his first league goal for Godset, scoring on a free kick in a 1–0 victory over Stabæk. Keita's progress caught the eye of Parma, and he attended trials with the Italian club in January 2009. However, he stayed in Norway for the next four years, winning the league with Strømsgodset in 2013.

=== Lech Poznań ===
On 2 July 2014, Keita joined Polish club Lech Poznań of the Ekstraklasa. On 20 July 2014, he made his league debut for Lech, starting in a 4–0 victory over Piast Gliwice. On 26 October 2014, he scored an 80th-minute goal to lead his club to a 1–0 victory over Górnik Łęczna. This was also his first goal with his new side. On 3 March 2015, Keita scored in a 5–1 victory over Znicz Pruszków in a Polish Cup match. On 4 April 2015, he opened the scoring for Lech in a 2–1 victory over GKS Bełchatów. In his first year in Poland, Keita helped his club capture the 2014–15 Ekstraklasa title. During the season he appeared in 28 matches and scored three goals.

=== Stabæk ===
On 22 June 2015, Keita returned to Norway joining Stabæk on loan. On 25 July 2015, he made his debut for Stabæk in a 2–2 draw with FK Haugesund. On 19 September 2015, Keita scored in extra time to help his club to a 2–1 victory over Tromsø, the goal was his first for Stabæk. On 23 September, he continued his scoring form for Stabæk, scoring his team's opening goal in a 3–2 loss to BK Rosenborg in the Norwegian Cup semi-finals. The following match day of 27 September he scored in his third straight match, this time leading Stabæk to a 1–0 victory over league rival Molde. He ended the season appearing in 13 matches scoring three goals as Stabæk finished in third place qualifying for the 2016–17 UEFA Europa League.

=== Return to Strømsgodset ===
During January 2016, Keita returned to Strømsgodset on loan from Lech Poznań. During his second spell with the club he scored many key goals for Strømsgodset. On 22 May 2016, he helped his club to a 3–2 come from behind victory over Vålerenga, scoring the first goal of the match for Godset. On 4 July 2016, he opened the scoring for his club in a 4–2 victory over Aalesund. Keita contributed with a game-winning goal the next matchday to help Godset to a 1–0 victory over Viking. On 17 July 2016, he was once again on the scoresheet as he scored a late goal to lead his club to a 1–0 victory over Tromsø. On 21 July 2016, he continued his fine form scoring a brace to help his side to a 2–2 draw against Danish club SønderjyskE in a Europa League match.

=== Return to Stabæk ===
On 17 August 2016, it was announced that Keita would be returning on loan to Stabæk as the club was embroiled in a relegation battle. In his short stint with the club he scored three key goals to help Stabæk avoid relegation. On 21 August 2016, he made his return for Stabæk scoring in a 3–0 victory over Aalesund. On 18 September Keita scored another goal to lead Stabæk to a 1–0 victory over Odd. On 16 October he scored from the penalty spot to help Stabæk gain a valuable point in a 1–1 draw against Vålerenga.

=== Vålerenga ===
On 25 March 2017, Keita was loaned to Norwegian side Vålerenga. During his short loan spell he appeared in 6 league matches scoring one goal. On 6 April 2017 he scored for the club in a 4–3 loss to Haugesund.

=== New York Red Bulls ===
On 28 July 2017, Keita signed a multi-year deal with Major League Soccer side New York Red Bulls. On 2 September 2017, he made his debut for New York appearing in a 2–2 draw at FC Dallas. On 22 October 2017, in the last game of the regular season, Keita recorded an assist by finding defender Michael Murillo for a game-tying goal against DC United in a 2–1 win. He was released from the club on 3 February 2018.

=== Third spell at Strømsgodset ===
Keita returned to his first club, Strømsgodset for the 2019 season, but failed to impress. He was released from the club after the 2019 season.

=== Ohod Club ===
On 2 January 2020, Keita signed with Ohod Club before being released the same month.

== Career statistics ==
As of match played 10 November 2019

Appearances and goals by club, season and competition
Club	Season	League			National cup (Note: Includes Norwegian Cup, Polish Cup, U.S. Open Cup)		Europe		Total	
Club	Season	Division	Apps	Goals	Apps	Goals	Apps	Goals	Apps	Goals
Strømsgodset	2008	Tippeligaen	9	0	3	4	—		12	4
Strømsgodset	2009	Tippeligaen	24	5	2	0	—		26	5
Strømsgodset	2010	Tippeligaen	22	3	6	2	—		28	5
Strømsgodset	2011	Tippeligaen	26	4	4	5	2 (Note: Appearance(s) in UEFA Europa League)	0	32	9
Strømsgodset	2012	Tippeligaen	19	3	5	2	—		24	5
Strømsgodset	2013	Tippeligaen	19	3	1	0	1	0	21	3
Strømsgodset	2014	Tippeligaen	6	0	1	0	—		7	0
Strømsgodset	Total		125	18	22	13	3	0	150	31
Lech Poznań	2014–15	Ekstraklasa	19	2	6	1	3	0	28	3
Lech Poznań II	2014–15	III liga, gr. C	1	1	—		—		1	1
Stabæk (loan)	2015	Tippeligaen	11	2	2	1	—		13	3
Stabæk (loan)	2016	Tippeligaen	9	3	0	0	—		9	3
Stabæk (loan)	Total		20	5	2	1	0	0	22	6
Strømsgodset (loan)	2016	Tippeligaen	13	4	2	0	2	2	17	6
Vålerenga (loan)	2017	Eliteserien	6	1	0	0	—		6	1
New York Red Bulls	2017	MLS	6	0	1	0	—		7	0
Strømsgodset	2019	Eliteserien	16	3	1	0	—		17	3
Career total			206	34	34	14	8	2	248	50

== Honours ==
Strømsgodset

- Tippeligaen: 2013
- Norwegian Football Cup: 2010

Lech Poznań

- Ekstraklasa: 2014–15
