= Oksval =

- Village
- Location in Akershus Oksval (Norway)
- Coordinates: 59°52′N 10°40′E
- Country: Norway
- Region: Østlandet
- County: Akershus
- Municipality: Nesodden
- Time zone: UTC+01:00 (CET)
  - Summer (DST): UTC+02:00 (CEST)

Oksval is a village in Nesodden, Akershus, Norway.

Oksval waterside.
