= Yassine El Ghanassy =

Belgian footballer

Personal information
- Full name: Yassine El Ghanassy
- Date of birth: 12 July 1990 (age 36)
- Place of birth: La Louvière, Belgium
- Height: 1.73 m (5 ft 8 in)
- Position: Left winger

Youth career
- 1995–1998: CS Fayt-Manage
- 1998–2008: La Louvière

Senior career*
Years	Team	Apps	(Gls)
2008	La Louvière	6	(0)
2008–2014	Gent	112	(16)
2012	→ West Bromwich Albion (loan)	0	(0)
2013	→ Heerenveen (loan)	12	(5)
2014	→ Al Ain (loan)	11	(1)
2015–2016	Stabæk	26	(3)
2016–2017	Oostende	36	(5)
2017–2019	Nantes	20	(0)
2018–2019	→ Al-Raed (loan)	16	(1)
2021	Újpest	1	(0)
2022	Zakynthos	10	(1)

International career^{‡}
2005	Belgium U16	1	(0)
2009	Belgium U19	3	(0)
2010–2011	Belgium U21	7	(1)
2011	Belgium	2	(0)
- * Club domestic league appearances and goals as of 21:00, 1 May 2022 (UTC) ‡ National team caps and goals as of 09:56, 12 February 2016 (UTC)

Yassine El Ghanassy (born 12 July 1990) is a Belgian professional footballer who plays as a left winger.

== Club career ==
Yassine El Ghanassy was born on 12 July 1990 as the only son of the former football player Hajjaj El Ghanassy. He started playing when he was fifteen at the team Fayt-Manage in Hainaut. He was signed by the youth team of La Louvière, where he quickly gained the attention of many sides. At the age of sixteen, he went to the English team Birmingham City, impressing on trial, but a transfer didn't follow as La Louvière wanted a transfer price which was too high for such a young player.

In 2008, El Ghanassy made his debut in the first team of La Louvière. The team had just been relegated to the Third Division and was about to merge with RACS Couillet. El Ghanassy received some playing time, but nevertheless left for Gent not long afterwards.

Although he was initially added to the youth team, he played a number of games in the Jupiler Pro League. Thanks to his creativity and drive he was being named as the successor to Bryan Ruiz, who had left in the summer of 2009 for FC Twente. Due to their similarities as players, he was compared to Ruiz by pundits.

In his first appearances for Gent, El Ghanassy became known as a fine passer of the ball, and one who provided many assists for his teammates, but rarely scored himself. His first goal was scored in the Belgian League playoffs in 2009/10 against Zulte Waregem. Since that goal he has become more prolific. One of his most important contributions was a goal against the Belarusian team FC Naftan Novopolotsk in the Champions League qualifiers. It was the only goal in that game, which meant that Gent qualified for the third qualifying round. During this period, El Ghanassy was followed by several European top teams, with Manchester City, Milan, Everton, Anderlecht, Sunderland and Lyon being linked with the Belgian. On 25 October 2010, it was revealed scouts from Scottish club Celtic had watched El Ghanassy in action. His agent described him as a "magician" in an interview with STV, saying he would encourage the player to move to the Glasgow club.

On 11 July 2012, West Bromwich Albion confirmed the loan signing of El Ghanassy from Gent. He signed a season-long deal with an option to make the move permanent in West Bromwich Albion's favour. He scored his first goal for WBA against Yeovil in the League Cup on 28 August 2012.

On 30 January 2013, Dutch side Heerenveen announced that they had signed El Ghanassy on loan for the rest of the season.

After turning down a three-year contract with Kairat in the Kazakhstan Premier League during January 2015, El Ghanassy signed a one-year contract with Stabæk on 29 March. On 12 April 2015, he played his first match for the club against Norwegian club Odds.

After spells with Oostende and FC Nantes, El Ghanassy was released by the latter in October 2019. In January 2020, he was in talks with Ligue 2 side Stade Malherbe Caen about a contract, but a move never materialized.

== International career ==
Because El Ghanassy has double Belgian-Moroccan nationality, he could choose to play for either country, leading to him playing International youth team games for both nations.

El Ghanassy was called up by the national coach Georges Leekens to play in the Belgium national team on 8 October 2010 and to play his first international game. El Ghanassy made his debut for Belgium in a friendly match against Finland, and as a result, would still be eligible to play for Morocco.

== Personal life ==
On 8 March 2018, El Ghanassy received a six-month prison sentence after appearing in court for a speeding offence for the 15th time. He was given the jail term by a court in Bruges and was banned from driving for two years. This happened after being caught for reckless driving in June 2016.

== Career statistics ==
=== Club ===
As of match played 4 July 2018

Appearances and goals by club, season and competition
Club	Season	League			National Cup		League Cup		Continental		Other		Total	
Club	Season	Division	Apps	Goals	Apps	Goals	Apps	Goals	Apps	Goals	Apps	Goals	Apps	Goals
La Louvière	2007–08		6	0			–		–		–		6	0
Gent	2008–09	Jupiler Pro League	11	0			–		–		–		11	0
Gent	2009–10	Jupiler Pro League	26	1	6	0	–		2	1	10	2	44	4
Gent	2010–11	Jupiler Pro League	30	6	5	1	–		10	0	9	0	54	7
Gent	2011–12	Jupiler Pro League	24	4	4	2	–		–		9	1	37	7
Gent	2012–13	Jupiler Pro League	0	0	0	0	–		–		–		0	0
Gent	2013–14	Jupiler Pro League	21	5	3	0	–		–		–		24	5
Gent	Total		112	16	18	3	0	0	12	1	28	3	170	23
West Bromwich Albion (loan)	2012–13	Premier League	0	0	1	0	2	1	–		–		3	1
Heerenveen (loan)	2012–13	Eredivisie	12	5	0	0	–		–		2	0	14	5
Al Ain (loan)	2013–14	UAE Arabian Gulf League	11	1	0	0	–		7	0	–		18	1
Stabæk	2015	Tippeligaen	26	3	4	0	–		–		–		30	3
Oostende	2015–16	Jupiler Pro League	5	1	0	0	–		–		10	4	15	5
Oostende	2016–17	Jupiler Pro League	28	4	5	0	–		–		8	0	41	4
Oostende	2017–18	Jupiler Pro League	3	0	0	0	–		1	0	0	0	4	0
Oostende	Total		36	5	5	0	0	0	1	0	18	4	60	9
Nantes	2017–18	Ligue 1	20	0	1	0	1	0	–		–		22	0
Career total			223	30	29	3	3	1	20	1	48	7	323	42

=== International ===
As of match played 10 August 2011

Appearances and goals by national team and year
National team	Year	Apps	Goals
Belgium	2011	2	0
Total		2	0

== Honours ==
K.A.A. Gent

- Belgian Cup (1): 2009–10
