= Ernest Asante =

Ghanaian footballer

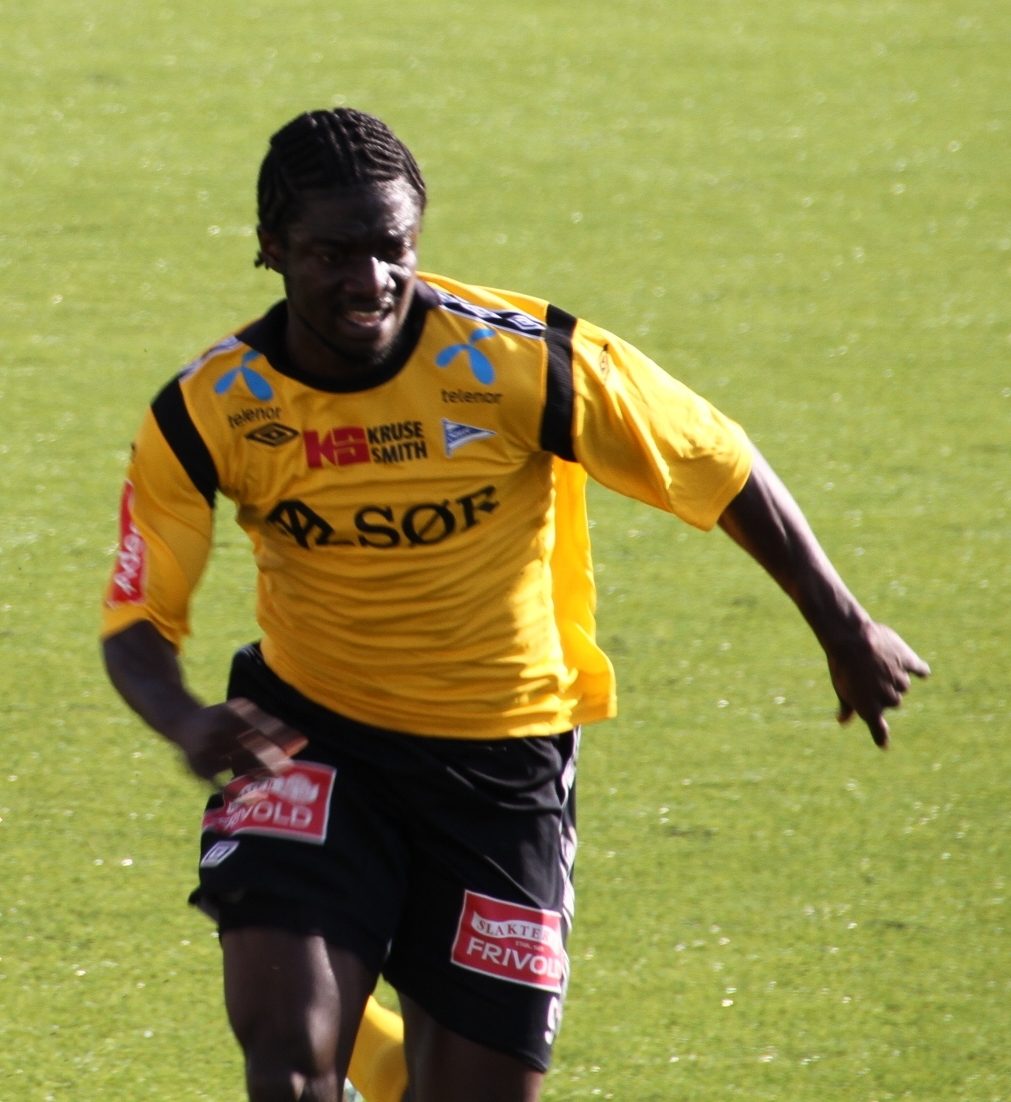
- Asante with IK Start in 2012

Personal information
- Date of birth: 6 November 1988 (age 37)
- Place of birth: Sunyani, Ghana
- Height: 1.71 m (5 ft 7 in)
- Positions: Forward; winger

Senior career*
Years	Team	Apps	(Gls)
2008–2009	Feyenoord Academy		
2009–2010	Beveren	26	(3)
2011–2014	Start	109	(25)
2015–2016	Stabæk	50	(12)
2016–2018	Nordsjælland	66	(21)
2018–2019	Al Jazira	24	(8)
2019–2020	Al-Hazem	9	(0)
2020	Al-Fujairah	7	(1)
2020–2022	Omonia	39	(10)
2022–2026	Doxa Katokopias	103	(18)
2022–2023	AEK Larnaca (loan)	11	(0)

International career^{‡}
2019	Ghana	1	(0)
- * Club domestic league appearances and goals as of 2 February 2026 ‡ National team caps and goals as of 23 March 2019 (UTC)

Ernest Asante (born 6 November 1988) is a Ghanaian footballer.

== Club career ==
=== Early career ===
Asante played for the Brong Ahafo U12 side in the National Milo Games hosted in Sunyani, B/A while attending middle school at Ridge.

=== Start ===
On 23 January 2011, Asante signed a three-year contract with Norwegian Tippeligaen side IK Start after impressing on trial. On 3 April 2011, he made his debut for Start in a 5–1 win against Strømsgodset, coming on as a substitute in the 60th minute and setting up a goal.

=== Stabæk ===
On 7 March 2015, Asante signed a three-year contract with league rivals Stabæk Fotball.

=== FC Nordsjælland ===
In August 2016 he signed a contract with Danish Superliga club FC Nordsjælland.

=== Omonia ===
On 24 August 2020, Asante signed a two-year contract with Cypriot First Division club Omonia. In his first season at the club, Asante helped Omonia win the league championship for the 21st time in club history. In April 2021, he suffered a rupture of the anterior cruciate ligament and meniscus injury, which kept him out of action for the rest of the season, and for a large portion of the following season. His team went on to win that year's Cypriot Cup.

=== Doxa Katokopias ===
On 27 August 2022, Asante joined Cypriot First Division club Doxa Katokopias. In September, he joined AEK Larnaca on a year-long loan.

== International career ==
Asante played in the 2005 FIFA U-17 World Championship, the eleventh edition of the tournament, which was held in the cities of Lima, Trujillo, Chiclayo, Piura and Iquitos in Peru between 16 September and 2 October 2005. Ghana placed third after drawing in all of their three group matches, scoring three and conceding three in the process.

He made his debut for the Ghana national football team on 23 March 2019 in an Africa Cup of Nations qualifier against Kenya, as a 76th-minute substitute for Jordan Ayew.

== Career statistics ==
As of 11 April 2021

Club	Season	Division	League		Cup		Continental		Total	
Club	Season	Division	Apps	Goals	Apps	Goals	Apps	Goals	Apps	Goals
Start	2011	Tippeligaen	23	0	4	1	–		27	1
Start	2012	Adeccoligaen	29	11	4	1	–		33	12
Start	2013	Tippeligaen	28	6	4	0	–		32	6
Start	2014	Tippeligaen	29	8	4	0	–		33	8
Start	Total		109	25	16	2	0	0	125	27
Stabæk	2015	Tippeligaen	30	10	6	2	–		36	12
Stabæk	2016	Tippeligaen	20	2	4	0	2	0	26	2
Stabæk	Total		50	12	10	2	2	0	62	14
Nordsjælland	2016–17	Superliga	30	5	2	0	–		32	5
Nordsjælland	2017–18	Superliga	36	16	0	0	–		36	16
Nordsjælland	Total		66	21	2	0	0	0	68	21
Al Jazira	2018–19	UAE Pro-League	26	8	1	0	–		27	8
Al-Hazem	2019–20	Saudi Pro League	9	0	0	0	–		9	0
Fujairah	2019–20	UAE Pro League	7	1	0	0	–		7	1
Omonia	2020–21	Cypriot First Division	30	8	2	0	9	1	41	9
Career total			297	75	31	4	11	1	339	80

== Honours ==
Omonia

- Cypriot First Division: 2020–21
- Cypriot Cup: 2021–22
- Cypriot Super Cup: 2021
