= Kamal Issah =

Ghanaian footballer (born 1992)

Personal information
- Full name: Kamal Issah Sissoko
- Date of birth: 29 August 1992 (age 34)
- Place of birth: Kumasi, Ghana
- Height: 1.78 m (5 ft 10 in)
- Position: Midfielder

Senior career*
Years	Team	Apps	(Gls)
2010–2011	Rennes B	20	(2)
2011–2013	Rennes	0	(0)
2013–2014	Nordsjæland	5	(0)
2015–2016	Stabæk	43	(4)
2016–2018	Gençlerbirliği	40	(1)
2018–2019	Eskişehirspor	30	(1)
2020–2021	İstanbulspor	24	(4)
2021	Ankara Keçiörengücü	11	(0)
2022	Östersund	8	(0)
2023–2026	Real Kashmir	21	(1)
2026–	Samaleswari		
- * Club domestic league appearances and goals as of 13 April 2024

Kamal Issah Sissoko (born 29 August 1992) is a Ghanaian professional footballer who plays as a midfielder for the Indian Football League club Samaleswari.

== Career ==
On 1 December 2014, it was announced that Issah had joined Norwegian Tippeligaen side Stabæk.

On 12 July 2017, he joined Grimsby Town on trial.
