= Emil Ekblom =

Norwegian footballer (born 1994)

Personal information
- Full name: Emil Mikael Ekblom
- Date of birth: 29 January 1994 (age 32)
- Height: 1.80 m (5 ft 11 in)
- Position: Striker

Youth career
- –2013: Stabæk

College career
Years	Team	Apps	(Gls)
2013–2014	Syracuse Orange	39	(18)

Senior career*
Years	Team	Apps	(Gls)
2015–2016	Stabæk	5	(0)
2015	→ Strømmen (loan)	15	(0)
2016	→ KFUM (loan)	25	(3)
2017	KFUM	22	(10)
- * Club domestic league appearances and goals as of 27 October 2022

Emil Mikael Ekblom (born 29 January 1994) is a retired Norwegian football striker who last played for KFUM.

== Career ==
Ekblom played youth and junior football for Stabæk before moving to the United States. He studied at the Syracuse University and played for Syracuse Orange, but returned to Norway to pursue a professional career. In 2015, he tried out for, and was signed by, Stabæk. He made his Norwegian Premier League debut in April 2015 against Odd.

Ekblom spent 15 matches on loan at Strømmen IF in 2015, and joined KFUM on loan in 2016. Following that season, the move was made permanent.

== Career statistics ==
As of 8 August 2017

Season	Club	Division	League		Cup		Total	
Season	Club	Division	Apps	Goals	Apps	Goals	Apps	Goals
2015	Stabæk	Tippeligaen	5	0	2	1	7	1
2015	Strømmen	OBOS-ligaen	15	0	0	0	15	0
2016	KFUM Oslo	OBOS-ligaen	25	3	3	1	28	4
2017	KFUM Oslo	PostNord-ligaen	13	6	2	1	15	7
Career Total			58	9	7	3	65	12
