= 2014 IK Start season =

Start
2014 season
- Chairman: Magne Kristiansen
- Manager: Mons Ivar Mjelde
- Stadium: Sør Arena
- Tippeligaen: 12th
- Norwegian Cup: Quarter-finals vs Sarpsborg 08
- Top goalscorer: League: Ernest Asante (8); All: Matthías Vilhjálmsson (9)
- Highest home attendance: 8,008 vs Stabæk (14 September 2014)
- Lowest home attendance: 944 vs Vard Haugesund (4 June 2014)
- Average home league attendance: 5,649
Home colours	Away colours

The 2014 season is Start's 2nd season in the Tippeligaen since their promotion back to the league in 2012, and their fourth season with Mons Ivar Mjelde as manager. Start competed in the Tippeligaen and, finishing 12th, and the Norwegian Cup, where they were knocked out at the Fourth Round by Sarpsborg 08.

== Squad ==
Note: Flags indicate national team as defined under FIFA eligibility rules; some limited exceptions apply. Players may hold more than one non-FIFA nationality.

No.	Pos.	Nation	Player
1	GK	NOR	Håkon Opdal (captain)
2	DF	NOR	Glenn Andersen
4	MF	NGR	Seyi Olofinjana
5	DF	NOR	Robert Sandnes
8	FW	NOR	Espen Hoff
9	FW	GHA	Ernest Asante
10	MF	NGR	Solomon Owello
13	FW	NOR	Zlatko Tripić
14	MF	NOR	Espen Børufsen
15	DF	CRC	Bismark Acosta
16	FW	NOR	Alexander Lind
17	MF	ISL	Guðmundur Kristjánsson

No.	Pos.	Nation	Player
18	FW	ISL	Matthías Vilhjálmsson
19	DF	NOR	Kristoffer Ajer
20	MF	NOR	John Olav Norheim
21	DF	NOR	Jon Hodnemyr
24	GK	NOR	Pål Vestly Heigre
22	FW	NOR	Lars-Jørgen Salvesen
26	DF	NOR	Jesper Mathisen
28	DF	NOR	Rolf Daniel Vikstøl
30	GK	NOR	Terje Reinertsen
33	DF	NOR	Amin Nouri
99	MF	CRC	Fernando Paniagua

== Transfers ==
=== Winter ===
In: Note: Flags indicate national team as defined under FIFA eligibility rules; some limited exceptions apply. Players may hold more than one non-FIFA nationality.

No.	Pos.	Nation	Player
4	DF	AUT	Markus Berger (from (Ukraine) Chornomorets Odesa)
5	DF	NOR	Robert Sandnes (from (Iceland) Selfoss)
13	MF	NOR	Zlatko Tripić (from (Norway) Molde)
16	FW	NOR	Alexander Lind (from (Norway) Donn)
99	MF	CRC	Fernando Paniagua (from (Costa Rica) Deportivo Saprissa)
20	FW	NOR	John Olav Norheim (from (Norway) Fløy)
21	DF	NOR	Jon Hodnemyr (from (Norway) Vindbjart)

Out: Note: Flags indicate national team as defined under FIFA eligibility rules; some limited exceptions apply. Players may hold more than one non-FIFA nationality.

No.	Pos.	Nation	Player
4	DF	NOR	Birger Madsen (retired)
5	MF	FIN	Markus Heikkinen (to (Finland) HJK)
16	FW	NOR	Christian Tveit (to (Norway) Nest-Sotra)
19	DF	NOR	Alain Delgado (to (Norway) Jerv)
21	MF	NOR	Henrik Dahlum (to (Norway) Jerv)
22	MF	NOR	Sondre Tronstad (to (England) Huddersfield)

=== Summer ===
In: Note: Flags indicate national team as defined under FIFA eligibility rules; some limited exceptions apply. Players may hold more than one non-FIFA nationality.

No.	Pos.	Nation	Player
4	MF	NGR	Seyi Olofinjana
19	MF	NOR	Kristoffer Ajer (from (Norway) Lillestrøm)
24	GK	NOR	Pål Vestly Heigre (to (Norway) Start)

Out: Note: Flags indicate national team as defined under FIFA eligibility rules; some limited exceptions apply. Players may hold more than one non-FIFA nationality.

No.	Pos.	Nation	Player
4	DF	AUT	Markus Berger (to (Russia) Ural)
6	MF	SEN	Babacar Sarr (to (Norway) Sogndal)
11	FW	CRC	Jorge Castro (on loan to (Norway) Sandnes Ulf)
—	MF	NOR	Robert Våge Skårdal (to (Norway) Fløy)

== Competitions ==
=== Tippeligaen ===
==== Results summary ====
Overall								Home						Away					
Pld	W	D	L	GF	GA	GD	Pts	W	D	L	GF	GA	GD	W	D	L	GF	GA	GD
30	10	5	15	47	60	−13	35	5	4	6	28	28	0	5	1	9	19	32	−13

==== Results by round ====
Round	1	2	3	4	5	6	7	8	9	10	11	12	13	14	15	16	17	18	19	20	21	22	23	24	25	26	27	28	29	30
Ground	A	H	A	A	H	A	H	A	H	A	H	A	H	H	A	H	A	H	A	H	A	H	H	A	H	A	H	A	H	A
Result	L	W	D	W	L	L	D	L	D	L	L	W	L	W	W	W	L	D	L	L	L	W	L	W	W	W	L	L	D	L
Position	13	7	8	5	8	10	10	11	11	12	12	12	12	12	9	8	9	9	10	11	11	11	12	11	10	7	9	10	12	12

Updated to match(es) played on 2 November 2014. Source: see below
A = Away; H = Home; W = Win; D = Draw; L = Loss

==== Results ====
30 March 2014 1	Strømsgodset	4–2	Start	Drammen
18:00 CEST (UTC+2)	Olsen (yellow card) 15'; Wikheim 16', 69'; Abu (yellow card) 21'; Francisco Júnior 35'; Sørum 46'	Summary	Asante 10', 27'; Nouri (yellow card) 45+2'; Sandnes (yellow card) 74'; Acosta (yellow card) 90'	Stadium: Marienlyst Stadion; Attendance: 6,845; Referee: Svein Oddvar Moen

6 April 2014 2	Start	3–1	Haugesund	Kristiansand
15:30 CEST (UTC+2)	Tripić (yellow card) 53'; Sarr 71'; Berger 75'; Kristjánsson 77'	Summary	Skjerve (yellow card) 8'; Engblom 23'; Andreassen (yellow card) 42'; Myrestam (yellow card) 50'; Elsner (yellow card) 70'	Stadium: Sør Arena; Attendance: 5,324; Referee: Trygve Kjensli

13 April 2014 3	Sarpsborg 08	1–1	Start	Sarpsborg
18:00 CEST (UTC+2)	Dja Djédjé (yellow card) 27'; Ernemann 45'	Summary	Vikstøl (yellow card) 45' (goal) 88'; Vilhjálmsson (yellow card) 51'; Kristjánsson (yellow card) 73'	Stadium: Sarpsborg Stadion; Attendance: 4,294; Referee: Ken Henry Johnsen

21 April 2014 4	Aalesund	1–2	Start	Ålesund
15:30 CEST (UTC+2)	Larsen (yellow card) 23'; Grytten (yellow card) 57'; Arnefjord 89'	Summary	Tripić 38'; Asante 59' (yellow card) 90'	Stadium: Color Line Stadion; Attendance: 7,608; Referee: Omar Rafiq

27 April 2014 5	Start	0–2	Viking	Kristiansand
19:00 CEST (UTC+2)	Berger (yellow card) 90+3'	Summary	de Lanlay 5'; Þorsteinsson 20'; Sigurðsson (yellow card) 57'; Ingason (yellow card) 77'	Stadium: Sør Arena; Attendance: 7,570; Referee: Andres Johansen

1 May 2014 6	Molde	2–0	Start	Molde
18:00 CEST (UTC+2)	Gulbrandsen 44'; Ekpo (yellow card) 45+1'; Chima 55'	Summary	Asante (yellow card) 24'; Tripić (yellow card) 34'; Berger (yellow card) 58'	Stadium: Aker Stadion; Attendance: 9,085; Referee: Svein Oddvar Moen

4 May 2014 7	Start	1–1	Brann	Kristiansand
19:00 CEST (UTC+2)	Hoff 33'	Summary	Mojsov (yellow card) 18'; Berger 80' (o.g.); I.Dramé (yellow card) 89'	Stadium: Sør Arena; Attendance: 6,504; Referee: Per Staberg

11 May 2014 8	Sogndal	2–1	Start	Sogndalsfjøra
18:00 CEST (UTC+2)	Otoo 67'; Patronen (yellow card) 85'; Valsvik 89'; Nilsen 90+1'	Summary	Andersen 65'	Stadium: Fosshaugane Campus; Attendance: 2,524; Referee: Martin Lundby

16 May 2014 9	Start	2–2	Vålerenga	Kristiansand
18:00 CEST (UTC+2)	Hoff 61'; Tripić 79'	Summary	Kjartansson 15', 90' (pen.)	Stadium: Sør Arena; Attendance: 8,555; Referee: Ken Henry Johnsen

20 May 2014 10	Bodø/Glimt	2–1	Start	Bodø
18:00 CEST (UTC+2)	Laajab 45', 80'	Summary	Andersen 36'; Berger (yellow card) 59'	Stadium: Aspmyra Stadion; Attendance: 2,912; Referee: Svein Edvartsen

25 May 2014 11	Start	0–1	Odd	Kristiansand
18:00 CEST (UTC+2)	Andersen (yellow card) 20'; Kristjánsson (yellow card) 22'; Acosta (red card) 64'; Owello (yellow card) 76'; Opdal (yellow card) 90+2'	Summary	Hagen 66'; Eriksen (yellow card) 73'; Rashani (yellow card) 86'; Berge (yellow card) 90+3'	Stadium: Sør Arena; Attendance: 5,210; Referee: Kristoffer Helgerud

9 June 2014 12	Stabæk	1–2	Start	Bærum
18:00 CEST (UTC+2)	Fontanello (yellow card) 47'; Trondsen (yellow card) 65' (goal) 67'	Summary	Nouri 18'; Børufsen (yellow card) 55'; Berger (yellow card) 67'; Sarr (yellow card) 75'; Castro 81'	Stadium: Nadderud Stadion; Attendance: 3,856; Referee: Trond Ivar Døvle

12 June 2014 13	Start	2–4	Rosenborg	Kristiansand
18:00 CEST (UTC+2)	Hoff (yellow card) 33' (goal) 90'; Castro 60'	Summary	Søderlund 20', 53'; Riski 36', 87'	Stadium: Sør Arena; Attendance: 6,559; Referee: Brage Sandmoen

6 July 2014 14	Start	3–1	Lillestrøm	Kristiansand
18:00 CEST (UTC+2)	Tripić 33' (pen.) (yellow card) 39'; Børufsen 47' (yellow card) 56'; Hoff 68'	Summary	Omoijuanfo (yellow card) 5'; Kippe (yellow card) 16'; Mjelde 36'	Stadium: Sør Arena; Attendance: 5,286; Referee: Tom Harald Hagen

12 July 2014 15	Sandnes Ulf	1–2	Start	Sandnes
18:00 CEST (UTC+2)	Rubio 80'; Jaiteh (yellow card) 87'	Summary	Vilhjálmsson 4', 15'; Paniagua (yellow card) 90+1'	Stadium: Sandnes Idrettspark; Attendance: 2,674; Referee: Ola Hobber Nilsen

19 July 2014 16	Start	2–1	Bodø/Glimt	Kristiansand
15:30 CEST (UTC+2)	Vikstøl (yellow card) 42'; Owello (yellow card) 52'; Acosta (yellow card) 59'; Sané 72' (o.g.); Asante 90+3'	Summary	Badou (yellow card) 45+1'; Laajab 56'	Stadium: Sør Arena; Attendance: 5,304; Referee: Dag Vidar Hafsås

27 July 2014 17	Haugesund	5–1	Start	Haugesund
15:30 CEST (UTC+2)	Gytkjær 12', 42'; Bamberg 67'; Sema 71', 88'	Summary	Hoff 11'; Kristjánsson (yellow card) 48'	Stadium: Haugesund Stadion; Attendance: 4,434; Referee: Ken Henry Johnsen

3 August 2014 18	Start	1–1	Molde	Kristiansand
18:00 CEST (UTC+2)	Hoff 74'	Summary	Gulbrandsen (yellow card) 20'; Chima 72'	Stadium: Sør Arena; Attendance: 5,565; Referee: Trygve Kjensli

10 August 2014 19	Rosenborg	3–2	Start	Trondheim
18:00 CEST (UTC+2)	Mix 29'; Søderlund 43', 83'	Summary	Asante 17'; Børufsen 26'; Paniagua (yellow card) 42'	Stadium: Lerkendal Stadion; Attendance: 11 513; Referee: Rohit Saggi

15 August 2014 20	Start	2–3	Strømsgodset	Kristiansand
19:00 CEST (UTC+2)	Acosta 4'; Hoff (yellow card) 79'; Asante 88'; Andersen (yellow card) 90+2'	Summary	Adjei-Boateng 23' (yellow card) 45+1'; Ogunjimi 38', 68'; Abu (yellow card) 81'; Kovács (yellow card) 90+3'	Stadium: Sør Arena; Attendance: 6,098; Referee: Brage Sandmoen

24 August 2014 21	Odd	4–1	Start	Skien
15:30 CEST (UTC+2)	Jensen (yellow card) 45+1'; Bentley 57'; Storbæk 75'; Johnsen 87', 90'	Summary	Børufsen 12' (yellow card) 33'; Olofinjana (yellow card) 18'	Stadium: Skagerak Arena; Attendance: 8,395; Referee: Ola Hobber Nilsen

31 August 2014 22	Start	3–2	Sogndal	Kristiansand
18:00 CEST (UTC+2)	Tripić 4'; Vikstøl 38'; Asante 84' (pen.)	Summary	Bolseth (yellow card) 18'; Sarr (yellow card) 21'; Otoo 35', 49'; Söderberg (yellow card) 79'	Stadium: Sør Arena; Attendance: 4,899; Referee: Svein Edvartsen

14 September 2014 23	Start	2–3	Stabæk	Kristiansand
18:00 CEST (UTC+2)	Hoff (yellow card) 13'; Olofinjana (yellow card) 15'; Vilhjálmsson 67'; Asante 90+4'	Summary	Skjønsberg (yellow card) 13'; Brustad 48'; Trondsen (yellow card) 66'; Jacobson 72' (yellow card) 84'; Boli 79'	Stadium: Sør Arena; Attendance: 8,008; Referee: Ken Henry Johnsen

21 September 2014 24	Viking	0–1	Start	Stavanger
15:30 CEST (UTC+2)	Böðvarsson (yellow card) 55'; Jørgensen (yellow card) 73'	Summary	Vilhjálmsson 68'; Asante (yellow card) 86'	Stadium: Viking Stadion; Attendance: 9,545; Referee: Ola Hobber Nilsen

28 September 2014 25	Start	3–1	Sarpsborg 08	Kristiansand
18:00 CEST (UTC+2)	Ajer 22'; Vikstøl (yellow card) 66'; Tripić 80', 82'	Summary	Kronberg (yellow card) 14'; Wiig 75'; Þórarinsson (yellow card) 85'	Stadium: Sør Arena; Attendance: 4,950; Referee: Anders Johansen

5 October 2014 26	Brann	1–2	Start	Bergen
20:00 CEST (UTC+2)	Mojsov (yellow card) 57'; Pedersen (yellow card) 68' (goal) 81'	Summary	Vilhjálmsson 18'; Karadas 62' (o.g.)	Stadium: Brann Stadion; Attendance: 11,347; Referee: Svein Oddvar Moen

18 October 2014 27	Start	1–2	Aalesund	Kristiansand
15:30 CEST (UTC+2)	Tripić (yellow card) 55'; Owello 87'	Summary	James 13'; H.Bjørdal (yellow card) 62'; Larsen 89'	Stadium: Sør Arena; Attendance: 4,835; Referee: Ken Henry Johnsen

26 October 2014 28	Lillestrøm	4–1	Start	Lillestrøm
18:00 CET (UTC+1)	Pálmason 33', 38', 69'; Knudtzon 50'	Summary	Børufsen (yellow card) 52'; Mikalsen 72' (o.g.)	Stadium: Åråsen Stadion; Attendance: 5,583; Referee: Ola Hobber Nilsen

2 November 2014 29	Start	3–3	Sandnes Ulf	Kristiansand
18:00 CET (UTC+1)	Kristjánsson (yellow card) 11' (goal) 45+2'; Ajer (yellow card) 32'; Acosta 90+3'; Salvesen 90+4'	Summary	Frejd 12'; Midtsjø 39' (yellow card) 53'; Brenes 47'	Stadium: Sør Arena; Attendance: 4,768; Referee: Kristoffer Helgerud

9 November 2014 30	Vålerenga	1–0	Start	Oslo
18:00 CET (UTC+1)	Stengel 40'	Summary		Stadium: Ullevaal Stadion; Attendance: 7,583; Referee: Svein Oddvar Moen

==== Table ====
Pos	Team	Pld	W	D	L	GF	GA	GD	Pts	Qualification or relegation
10	Viking	30	8	12	10	42	42	0	36	
11	Haugesund	30	10	6	14	43	49	−6	36	
12	Start	30	10	5	15	47	60	−13	35	
13	Bodø/Glimt	30	10	5	15	45	60	−15	35	
14	Brann (R)	30	8	5	17	41	54	−13	29	Qualification for the relegation play-offs

Source: fotball.no
Rules for classification: 1) points; 2) goal difference; 3) number of goals scored.
(R) Relegated

=== Norwegian Cup ===
24 April 2014 First Round	Høllen	0–4	Start	Søgne
18:00 CEST (UTC+2)	C.Rogstad (yellow card) 16' (red card) 55'; (yellow card) 81'; J.E.Langeland (yellow card) 87'	Summary	Kristjánsson (yellow card) 17'; Vilhjálmsson 31'; Lind 57'; Sarr (yellow card) 74'; Tripić 76' (pen.), 79' (pen.)	Stadium: Søgne Stadion; Attendance: 3,350; Referee: Espen Larsen

7 May 2014 Second Round	Jerv	1–2	Start	Grimstad
18:00 CEST (UTC+2)	Pepa 16'; A.Delgado (yellow card) 27'; Stray (yellow card) 45+1'; S.Bera (yellow card) 59'; J.Aaland (yellow card) 75'	Summary	Kristjánsson (yellow card) 41'; Berger (yellow card) 45+2'; Vikstøl (yellow card) 56'; Hoff (yellow card) 68'; Andersen 74'; Castro 90+7'	Stadium: Levermyr stadion Referee: Rohit Saggi

4 June 2014 Third Round	Start	4–0	Vard Haugesund	Kristiansand
18:00 CEST (UTC+2)	Vilhjálmsson 4', 88', (yellow card) 38'; Acosta 33'; Vikstøl (yellow card) 62'; Berger (yellow card) 68'; Castro 79'	Summary	H.Vindenes (yellow card) 37'; Powell (yellow card) 78'	Stadium: Sør Arena; Attendance: 944; Referee: Kristoffer Helgerud

27 June 2014 Fourth Round	Sarpsborg 08	3–2	Start	Sarpsborg
19:00 CEST (UTC+2)	Samuel 3' (pen.), 57'; Hansen (yellow card) 67'; Dja Djédjé 81'	Summary	Opdal (yellow card) 3'; Acosta (yellow card) 51'; Hoff 56'; Vilhjálmsson 86'	Stadium: Sarpsborg Stadion; Attendance: 1,604; Referee: Espen Berntsen

== Squad statistics ==
As of match played 9 November 2014

=== Appearances and goals ===
No.	Pos	Nat	Player	Total		Tippeligaen		Norwegian Cup	
No.	Pos	Nat	Player	Apps	Goals	Apps	Goals	Apps	Goals
1	GK	(Norway) NOR	Håkon Opdal	21	0	20	0	1	0
2	DF	(Norway) NOR	Glenn Andersen	30	3	25+2	2	3	1
4	MF	(Nigeria) NGR	Seyi Olofinjana	7	0	4+3	0	0	0
5	DF	(Norway) NOR	Robert Sandnes	17	0	4+11	0	2	0
8	FW	(Norway) NOR	Espen Hoff	30	7	22+6	6	2	1
9	FW	(Ghana) GHA	Ernest Asante	33	8	21+8	8	3+1	0
10	MF	(Nigeria) NGR	Solomon Owello	32	1	24+4	1	4	0
13	FW	(Norway) NOR	Zlatko Tripić	31	8	25+2	6	1+3	2
14	MF	(Norway) NOR	Espen Børufsen	26	3	21+2	3	3	0
15	DF	(Costa Rica) CRC	Bismark Acosta	28	3	25	2	3	1
16	FW	(Norway) NOR	Alexander Lind	13	1	2+10	0	1	1
17	MF	(Iceland) ISL	Guðmundur Kristjánsson	32	2	23+6	2	3	0
18	FW	(Iceland) ISL	Matthías Vilhjálmsson	26	9	20+3	5	1+2	4
19	DF	(Norway) NOR	Kristoffer Ajer	13	1	7+6	1	0	0
21	DF	(Norway) NOR	Jon Hodnemyr	2	0	1	0	0+1	0
22	FW	(Norway) NOR	Lars-Jørgen Salvesen	3	1	1+2	1	0	0
24	GK	(Norway) NOR	Pål Vestly Heigre	1	0	1	0	0	0
26	DF	(Norway) NOR	Jesper Mathisen	4	0	4	0	0	0
28	DF	(Norway) NOR	Rolf Daniel Vikstøl	30	2	26+1	2	3	0
30	GK	(Norway) NOR	Terje Reinertsen	12	0	9	0	3	0
32	MF	(Norway) NOR	Mathias Rasmussen	2	0	0+1	0	0+1	0
33	DF	(Norway) NOR	Amin Nouri	26	1	16+6	1	4	0
99	MF	(Costa Rica) CRC	Fernando Paniagua	16	0	12+3	0	1	0
Players away from the club on loan:
11	FW	(Costa Rica) CRC	Jorge Castro	10	4	2+5	2	2+1	2
Players who played for Start that left during the season:
4	DF	(Austria) AUT	Markus Berger	14	1	11	1	3	0
6	MF	(Senegal) SEN	Babacar Sarr	17	1	4+9	1	1+3	0

=== Goal scorers ===
Place	Position	Nation	Number	Name	Tippeligaen	Norwegian Cup	Total
1	FW	(Iceland)	18	Matthías Vilhjálmsson	5	4	9
2	FW	(Ghana)	9	Ernest Asante	8	0	8
2	MF	(Norway)	13	Zlatko Tripić	6	2	8
4	MF	(Norway)	8	Espen Hoff	6	1	7
5	FW	(Costa Rica)	11	Jorge Castro	2	2	4
6	MF	(Norway)	14	Espen Børufsen	3	0	3
6	DF	(Costa Rica)	15	Bismark Acosta	2	1	3
6				Own goal	3	0	3
9	DF	(Norway)	28	Rolf Daniel Vikstøl	2	0	2
9	DF	(Norway)	2	Glenn Andersen	2	0	2
9	MF	(Iceland)	17	Guðmundur Kristjánsson	2	0	2
12	MF	(Senegal)	6	Babacar Sarr	1	0	1
12	DF	(Austria)	4	Markus Berger	1	0	1
12	DF	(Norway)	33	Amin Nouri	1	0	1
12	DF	(Norway)	19	Kristoffer Ajer	1	0	1
12	MF	(Nigeria)	10	Solomon Owello	1	0	1
12	FW	(Norway)	22	Lars-Jørgen Salvesen	1	0	1
12	FW	(Norway)	16	Alexander Lind	0	1	1
12	DF	(Norway)	2	Glenn Andersen	0	1	1
				TOTALS	47	12	59

=== Disciplinary record ===
Number	Nation	Position	Name	Tippeligaen		Norwegian Cup		Total	
Number	Nation	Position	Name	Yellow card	Red card	Yellow card	Red card	Yellow card	Red card
1	(Norway)	GK	Håkon Opdal	1	0	1	0	2	0
2	(Norway)	DF	Glenn Andersen	2	0	0	0	2	0
4	(Austria)	DF	Markus Berger	4	0	2	0	6	0
4	(Nigeria)	MF	Seyi Olofinjana	2	0	0	0	2	0
5	(Norway)	DF	Robert Sandnes	1	0	0	0	1	0
6	(Senegal)	MF	Babacar Sarr	1	0	1	0	2	0
8	(Norway)	MF	Espen Hoff	3	0	1	0	4	0
9	(Ghana)	FW	Ernest Asante	3	0	0	0	3	0
10	(Nigeria)	MF	Solomon Owello	2	0	0	0	2	0
13	(Norway)	FW	Zlatko Tripić	4	0	0	0	4	0
14	(Norway)	MF	Espen Børufsen	4	0	0	0	4	0
15	(Costa Rica)	DF	Bismark Acosta	1	1	1	0	2	1
17	(Iceland)	MF	Guðmundur Kristjánsson	4	0	2	0	6	0
18	(Iceland)	FW	Matthías Vilhjálmsson	2	0	1	0	3	0
19	(Norway)	DF	Kristoffer Ajer	1	0	0	0	1	0
28	(Norway)	DF	Rolf Daniel Vikstøl	3	0	2	0	5	0
33	(Norway)	DF	Amin Nouri	1	0	0	0	1	0
99	(Costa Rica)	MF	Fernando Paniagua	2	0	0	0	2	0
			TOTALS	41	1	11	0	52	1
