= 2013 IK Start season =

Start
2013 season
- Chairman: Magne Kristiansen
- Manager: Mons Ivar Mjelde
- Stadium: Sør Arena
- Tippeligaen: 9th
- Norwegian Cup: Quarter-finals vs Lillestrøm
- Top goalscorer: League: Matthías Vilhjálmsson (11); All: Matthías Vilhjálmsson (14)
- Highest home attendance: 6,737 vs Vålerenga; 19 April 2013
- Lowest home attendance: 2,150 vs Stabæk; 19 June 2013
- Average home league attendance: 5,825
Home colours	Away colours

The Norwegian football club IK Start returned to the top league Tippeligaen for the 2013 season. It was their second full season with Mons Ivar Mjelde as manager, and they finished the season in 9th place. They also took part in the Norwegian Cup, reaching the quarter-finals stage before being beaten by Lillestrøm.

== Squad ==
As of 1 February 2013. Note: Flags indicate national team as defined under FIFA eligibility rules; some limited exceptions apply. Players may hold more than one non-FIFA nationality.

No.	Pos.	Nation	Player
1	GK	NOR	Håkon Opdal
2	DF	NOR	Glenn Andersen
4	DF	NOR	Birger Madsen
5	DF	FIN	Markus Heikkinen
6	MF	SEN	Babacar Sarr
8	FW	NOR	Espen Hoff
9	FW	GHA	Ernest Asante
10	MF	NGR	Solomon Owello
11	FW	CRC	Jorge Alejandro Castro
14	MF	NOR	Espen Børufsen
15	DF	CRC	Bismark Acosta

No.	Pos.	Nation	Player
16	FW	NOR	Christian Tveit
17	MF	ISL	Guðmundur Kristjánsson
18	FW	ISL	Matthías Vilhjálmsson
19	DF	NOR	Alain Delgado
21	FW	NOR	Henrik Dahlum
22	MF	NOR	Sondre Tronstad
26	DF	NOR	Jesper Mathisen
28	DF	NOR	Rolf Daniel Vikstøl
30	GK	NOR	Terje Reinertsen
31	FW	NOR	Joachim Eriksen
33	DF	NOR	Amin Nouri

== Transfers ==
=== Winter ===
In: Note: Flags indicate national team as defined under FIFA eligibility rules; some limited exceptions apply. Players may hold more than one non-FIFA nationality.

No.	Pos.	Nation	Player
6	MF	SEN	Babacar Sarr (from (Iceland) Selfoss)

Out: Note: Flags indicate national team as defined under FIFA eligibility rules; some limited exceptions apply. Players may hold more than one non-FIFA nationality.

No.	Pos.	Nation	Player
5	MF	NGR	Oladapo Olufemi (to (Nigeria) Shooting Stars)
7	MF	NOR	Fredrik Strømstad (to (Norway) Tigerberget)
15	GK	NOR	Arild Østbø (loan return to (Norway) Viking)
20	FW	USA	Villyan Bijev (loan return to (England) Liverpool)
24	DF	NOR	Steinar Pedersen (Retired)

=== Summer ===
In: Note: Flags indicate national team as defined under FIFA eligibility rules; some limited exceptions apply. Players may hold more than one non-FIFA nationality.

No.	Pos.	Nation	Player
5	DF	FIN	Markus Heikkinen (from (Austria) Rapid Wien)

Out: Note: Flags indicate national team as defined under FIFA eligibility rules; some limited exceptions apply. Players may hold more than one non-FIFA nationality.

No.	Pos.	Nation	Player

== Competitions ==
=== Tippeligaen ===
==== Results summary ====
Overall								Home						Away					
Pld	W	D	L	GF	GA	GD	Pts	W	D	L	GF	GA	GD	W	D	L	GF	GA	GD
30	10	8	12	43	46	−3	38	5	5	5	25	23	+2	5	3	7	18	23	−5

==== Results ====
17 March 2013 1	Start	3–2	Hønefoss	Kristiansand
19:00 CET (UTC+1)	Mathisen 13' (yellow card) 28'; Vilhjálmsson 23'; Hoff 33' (pen.)	Summary	Mats André Kaland 54'; Riski (yellow card) 55'; Mora 63'; Groven (yellow card) 75'	Stadium: Sør Arena; Attendance: 4,729; Referee: Dag Hafsås

6 April 2013 2	Start	2–2	Tromsø	Kristiansand
16:30 CEST (UTC+2)	Hoff 56' (pen.); Kristjánsson 78'	Summary	Koppinen 72'; Moldskred 74'	Stadium: Sør Arena; Attendance: 5,712; Referee: Svein Erik Edvartsen

12 April 2013 3	Rosenborg	1–1	Start	Trondheim
20:00 CEST (UTC+2)	Elyounoussi 8'; Bille Nielsen (yellow card) 65'	Summary	Kristjánsson (yellow card) 45'; Mathisen (yellow card) 52'; Bismark Acosta (yellow card) 65'; Owello (yellow card) 67'; Børufsen 87'	Stadium: Lerkendal Stadion; Attendance: 15,662; Referee: Tom Harald Hagen

19 April 2013 4	Start	1–0	Vålerenga	Kristiansand
20:00 CEST (UTC+2)	Vikstøl (yellow card) 40'; Asante 74'	Summary	Aaron Samuel Olanare (yellow card) 71'; Zajić (yellow card) 82'; Berre (yellow card) 84'	Stadium: Sør Arena; Attendance: 6,737; Referee: Espen Berntsen

24 April 2013 5	Haugesund	3–2	Start	Haugesund
18:30 CEST (UTC+2)	Gytkjær 34', 51'; Andreassen 46'; Eirik Mæland (yellow card) 52'	Summary	Castro 45', 77'; Nouri (yellow card) 74'	Stadium: Haugesund Stadion; Attendance: 4,648; Referee: Kristoffer Helgerud

27 April 2013 6	Lillestrøm	3–2	Start	Lillestrøm
16:30 CEST (UTC+2)	Pálmason 25'; Moen 54' (pen.); Helstad 56'	Summary	Castro 22'; Vilhjálmsson 41' (yellow card) 63'; Babacar Sarr (yellow card) 47' (yellow-red card) 75'; Opdal (yellow card) 53'; Owello (yellow card) 70'	Stadium: Åråsen Stadion; Attendance: 4,765; Referee: Anders Johansen

6 May 2013 7	Start	1–1	Molde	Kristiansand
20:00 CEST (UTC+2)	Castro 43'; Kristjánsson (yellow card) 88'	Summary	Moström (yellow card) 5' (goal) 45'; Hoseth (yellow card) 25'	Stadium: Sør Arena; Attendance: 5,612; Referee: Brage Sandmoen

9 May 2013 8	Brann	2–0	Start	Bergen
20:00 CEST (UTC+2)	Korcsmár (yellow card) 17'; Sokolowski 19'; Askar 52'	Summary	Andersen (yellow card) 31'; Hoff (yellow card) 34'; Bismark Acosta (yellow card) 41'	Stadium: Brann Stadion; Attendance: 10,702; Referee: Dag Hafsås

12 May 2013 9	Start	1–2	Viking	Kristiansand
20:00 CEST (UTC+2)	Hoff 26'; Kristjánsson (yellow card) 57'	Summary	Sigurðsson (yellow card) 33'; Olsen 45'; Ørnskov (yellow card) 71'; Skogseid (yellow card) 80'; Babacar Sarr 90+2' (o.g.)	Stadium: Sør Arena; Attendance: 6,360; Referee: Ken Henry Johnsen

16 May 2013 10	Odd	0–1	Start	Skien
21:00 CEST (UTC+2)		Summary	Vikstøl 60'; Børufsen (yellow card) 67'	Stadium: Skagerak Arena; Attendance: 6,397; Referee: Tommy Skjerven

20 May 2013 11	Start	0–6	Strømsgodset	Kristiansand
16:30 CEST (UTC+2)		Summary	Adjei-Boateng 7' (yellow card) 85'; Johansen 11'; Storbæk 18'; Andersen 38' (o.g.); Diomande 54'; Horn (red card) 59'; Ibrahim (yellow card) 63'; Gustav Wikheim 90'	Stadium: Sør Arena; Attendance: 6,001; Referee: Per Staberg

26 May 2013 12	Sogndal	1–1	Start	Sogndalsfjøra
19:00 CEST (UTC+2)	Karadas 33' (yellow card) 80'	Summary	Bismark Acosta (yellow card) 13'; Vilhjálmsson 69'; Kristjánsson (yellow card) 80'	Stadium: Fosshaugane Campus; Attendance: 4,011; Referee: Kjetil Sælen

22 June 2013 13	Sarpsborg 08	2–1	Start	Sarpsborg
15:30 CEST (UTC+2)	Hoås 9'; Brink 47'	Summary	Asante 53'	Stadium: Sarpsborg Stadion; Attendance: 3,336; Referee: Tommy Skjerven

30 June 2013 14	Start	2–2	Aalesund	Kristiansand
18:00 CEST (UTC+2)	Asante 49'; Vilhjálmsson 61'	Summary	Ulvestad 34'; Larsen 38'	Stadium: Sør Arena; Attendance: 5,295; Referee: Trond Ivar Døvle

7 July 2013 15	Sandnes Ulf	3 1	Start	Sandnes
18:00 CEST (UTC+2)	Sola 28', 63'; Høiland 54'	Summary	Hoff 11'	Stadium: Sandnes Idrettspark; Attendance: 2,241; Referee: Tommy Skjerven

13 July 2013 16	Start	3–3	Brann	Kristiansand
19:00 CEST (UTC+2)	Vikstøl 3'; Asante 24'; Kristjánsson 76'; Owello (red card) 90+5'	Summary	Pusic 8'; Andersen 47' (o.g.); Larsen 71'	Stadium: Sør Arena; Attendance: 6,214; Referee: Svein Oddvar Moen

28 July 2013 17	Viking	3–0	Start	Stavanger
19:00 CEST (UTC+2)	Sigurðsson 6'; Bjørdal 44'; Sulimani 70'	Summary		Stadium: Viking Stadion; Attendance: 9,534; Referee: Kjetil Sælen

3 August 2013 18	Start	0–1	Odd	Kristiansand
15:30 CEST (UTC+2)		Summary	Jensen 35'	Stadium: Sør Arena; Attendance: 4,855; Referee: Omar Rafiq

11 August 2013 19	Vålerenga	1–3	Start	Oslo
19:00 CEST (UTC+2)	Lecjaks 90+1'	Summary	Castro 26'; Acosta 40'; Tronstad 81'	Stadium: Ullevaal Stadion; Attendance: 8,553; Referee: Svein Erik Edvartsen

18 August 2013 20	Start	1–2	Haugesund	Kristiansand
15:30 CEST (UTC+2)	Castro 76'	Summary	Mathisen 40'; Gytkjær 42'	Stadium: Sør Arena; Attendance: 5,628; Referee: Trygve Kjensli

25 August 2013 21	Aalesund	1–1	Start	Ålesund
15:30 CEST (UTC+2)	Barrantes 73'	Summary	Heikkinen 77'	Stadium: Color Line Stadion; Attendance: 8,657; Referee: Brage Sandmoen

1 September 2013 22	Start	7–0	Sandnes Ulf	Kristiansand
15:30 CEST (UTC+2)	Vikstøl 8'; Vilhjálmsson 32', 48', 58'; Asante 54'; Hoff 72'; Acosta 79'	Summary		Stadium: Sør Arena; Attendance: 4,982; Referee: Ola Hobber Nilsen

15 September 2013 23	Hønefoss	0–1	Start	Hønefoss
18:00 CEST (UTC+2)		Summary	Heikkinen 50'	Stadium: Aka Arena; Attendance: 2,909; Referee: Tom Harald Hagen

22 September 2013 24	Start	2–0	Sogndal	Kristiansand
18:00 CEST (UTC+2)	Vilhjálmsson 28', 48'	Summary		Stadium: Sør Arena; Attendance: 10,345; Referee: Trygve Kjensli

29 September 2013 25	Tromsø	2–3	Start	Tromsø
18:00 CEST (UTC+2)	Ondrášek 67'; Nystrøm 71'	Summary	Hoff 40'; Acosta 48'; Vilhjálmsson 62'	Stadium: Alfheim Stadion; Attendance: 6,033; Referee: Svein Oddvar Moen

6 October 2013 26	Start	1–1	Sarpsborg 08	Kristiansand
15:30 CEST (UTC+2)	Vilhjálmsson 46'	Summary	Ernemann 60'	Stadium: Sør Arena; Attendance: 6,884; Referee: Per Ivar Staberg

19 October 2013 27	Start	0–1	Rosenborg	Kristiansand
18:00 CEST (UTC+2)		Summary	Svensson 84'	Stadium: Sør Arena; Attendance: 7,013; Referee: Svein Erik Edvartsen

27 October 2013 28	Strømsgodset	1–0	Start	Drammen
19:00 CEST (UTC+2)	Kovács 82'	Summary		Stadium: Marienlyst Stadion; Attendance: 6,577; Referee: Brage Sandmoen

3 November 2013 29	Start	1–0	Lillestrøm	Kristiansand
18:00 CET (UTC+1)	Mathisen 6'	Summary		Stadium: Sør Arena; Attendance: 6,380; Referee: Kristoffer Helgerund

10 November 2013 30	Molde	0–1	Start	Molde
18:00 CET (UTC+1)		Summary	Asante 49'	Stadium: Aker Stadion; Attendance: 7,906; Referee: Martin Lundby

==== Table ====
Pos	Team	Pld	W	D	L	GF	GA	GD	Pts
7	Odd	30	11	7	12	43	39	+4	40
8	Brann	30	11	6	13	46	46	0	39
9	Start	30	10	8	12	43	46	−3	38
10	Lillestrøm	30	9	9	12	37	44	−7	36
11	Vålerenga	30	10	6	14	41	50	−9	36

Source: fotball.no
Rules for classification: 1) points; 2) goal difference; 3) number of goals scored.

=== Norwegian Cup ===
16 April 2013 First Round	Vigør	0–2	Start	Kristiansand
18:00 CEST (UTC+2)		Report	Vilhjálmsson 9'; Atle Brattum 38' (o.g.)	Stadium: Hellemyr kunstgress Attendance: 1,148; Referee: Espen Larsen

1 May 2013 Second Round	Egersund	2–3	Start	Egersund
18:00 CEST (UTC+2)	Kim Robert Nyborg 9'; Jan Eric Gløpstad 62'	Report	Vilhjálmsson 40'; Hoff 76'; Kristjánsson 87'	Stadium: Idrettsparken; Attendance: 1,050; Referee: Jørn Voll

30 May 2013 Third Round	Flekkerøy	1–2	Start	Kristiansand
18:00 CEST (UTC+2)	Dardan Dreshaj 27'	Summary	Castro 3'; Vilhjálmsson 83'	Stadium: Flekkerøy stadion Attendance: 2,500; Referee: Tore Hansen

19 June 2013 Fourth Round	Start	2–1	Stabæk	Kristiansand
18:00 CEST (UTC+2)	Acosta 32'; Jalasto 60' (o.g.)	Report	Brustad 37'	Stadium: Sør Arena; Attendance: 2,150; Referee: Svein Oddvar Moen

4 July 2013 Quarter-finals	Start	0–1	Lillestrøm	Kristiansand
19:00 CEST (UTC+2)		Summary	Pálmason 71'	Stadium: Sør Arena; Attendance: 4,135; Referee: Dag Vidar Hafsås

== Squad statistics ==
As of 11 November 2013

=== Appearances and goals ===
No.	Pos	Nat	Player	Total		Tippeligaen		Norwegian Cup	
No.	Pos	Nat	Player	Apps	Goals	Apps	Goals	Apps	Goals
1	GK	(Norway) NOR	Håkon Opdal	33	0	30+0	0	3+0	0
2	DF	(Norway) NOR	Glenn Andersen	27	0	22+1	0	4+0	0
5	DF	(Finland) FIN	Markus Heikkinen	10	2	10+0	2	0+0	0
6	MF	(Senegal) SEN	Babacar Sarr	28	0	6+17	0	2+3	0
8	FW	(Norway) NOR	Espen Hoff	33	7	27+2	6	3+1	1
9	FW	(Ghana) GHA	Ernest Asante	33	6	16+12	6	3+2	0
10	MF	(Nigeria) NGR	Solomon Owello	30	0	26+1	0	3+0	0
11	FW	(Costa Rica) CRC	Jorge Castro	34	7	15+14	6	4+1	1
14	MF	(Norway) NOR	Espen Børufsen	33	1	29+0	1	4+0	0
15	DF	(Costa Rica) CRC	Bismark Acosta	32	4	27+0	3	5+0	1
16	FW	(Norway) NOR	Christian Tveit	16	0	2+10	0	0+4	0
17	MF	(Iceland) ISL	Guðmundur Kristjánsson	31	3	21+5	2	5+0	1
18	FW	(Iceland) ISL	Matthías Vilhjálmsson	34	14	25+4	11	5+0	3
21	FW	(Norway) NOR	Henrik Dahlum	1	0	0+0	0	0+1	0
22	MF	(Norway) NOR	Sondre Tronstad	11	1	4+5	1	1+1	0
25	DF	(Norway) NOR	Alexander Jones	1	0	0+0	0	1+0	0
26	DF	(Norway) NOR	Jesper Mathisen	24	2	22+1	2	1+0	0
28	DF	(Norway) NOR	Rolf Daniel Vikstøl	33	2	28+0	2	5+0	0
30	GK	(Norway) NOR	Terje Reinertsen	2	0	0+0	0	2+0	0
33	DF	(Norway) NOR	Amin Nouri	25	0	20+1	0	4+0	0
34	MF	(Bosnia and Herzegovina) BIH	Omar Marković	1	0	0+1	0	0+0	0
35	MF	(Norway) NOR	Jonas Kristensen	1	0	0+0	0	0+1	0
Players away from Start on loan:
Players who left Start during the season:

=== Goal scorers ===
Place	Position	Nation	Number	Name	Tippeligaen	Norwegian Cup	Total
1	FW	(Iceland)	18	Matthías Vilhjálmsson	11	3	14
2	FW	(Costa Rica)	11	Jorge Castro	6	1	7
2	FW	(Norway)	8	Espen Hoff	6	1	7
4	FW	(Ghana)	9	Ernest Asante	6	0	6
5	DF	(Costa Rica)	15	Bismark Acosta	3	1	4
6	DF	(Norway)	28	Rolf Daniel Vikstøl	3	0	3
6	MF	(Iceland)	17	Guðmundur Kristjánsson	2	1	3
8	DF	(Norway)	26	Jesper Mathisen	2	0	2
8	DF	(Finland)	5	Markus Heikkinen	2	0	2
8				Own goal	0	2	2
11	MF	(Norway)	14	Espen Børufsen	1	0	1
11	MF	(Norway)	22	Sondre Tronstad	1	0	1
				TOTALS	43	9	52

=== Disciplinary record ===
Number	Nation	Position	Name	Tippeligaen		Norwegian Cup		Total	
Number	Nation	Position	Name	Yellow card	Red card	Yellow card	Red card	Yellow card	Red card
1	(Norway)	GK	Håkon Opdal	1	0	0	0	1	0
2	(Norway)	DF	Glenn Andersen	2	0	1	0	3	0
5	(Finland)	DF	Markus Heikkinen	1	0	0	0	1	0
6	(Senegal)	MF	Babacar Sarr	4	1	2	0	6	1
8	(Norway)	FW	Espen Hoff	4	0	1	0	5	0
9	(Ghana)	FW	Ernest Asante	0	0	1	0	1	0
10	(Nigeria)	MF	Solomon Owello	5	1	0	0	5	1
11	(Costa Rica)	FW	Jorge Castro	1	0	0	0	1	0
14	(Norway)	MF	Espen Børufsen	3	0	1	0	4	0
15	(Costa Rica)	DF	Bismark Acosta	7	0	0	0	7	0
17	(Iceland)	MF	Guðmundur Kristjánsson	7	0	0	0	7	0
18	(Iceland)	FW	Matthías Vilhjálmsson	3	0	0	0	3	0
26	(Norway)	DF	Jesper Mathisen	3	0	0	0	3	0
28	(Norway)	DF	Rolf Daniel Vikstøl	5	0	0	0	5	0
33	(Norway)	DF	Amin Nouri	1	0	0	0	1	0
			TOTALS	47	2	6	0	53	2
