= Alexander Lind =

Alexander Lind may refer to:

- Alexander Lind (footballer, born 1989)
- Alexander Lind (footballer, born 2002)
