= Amin Nouri =

Norwegian footballer (born 1990)

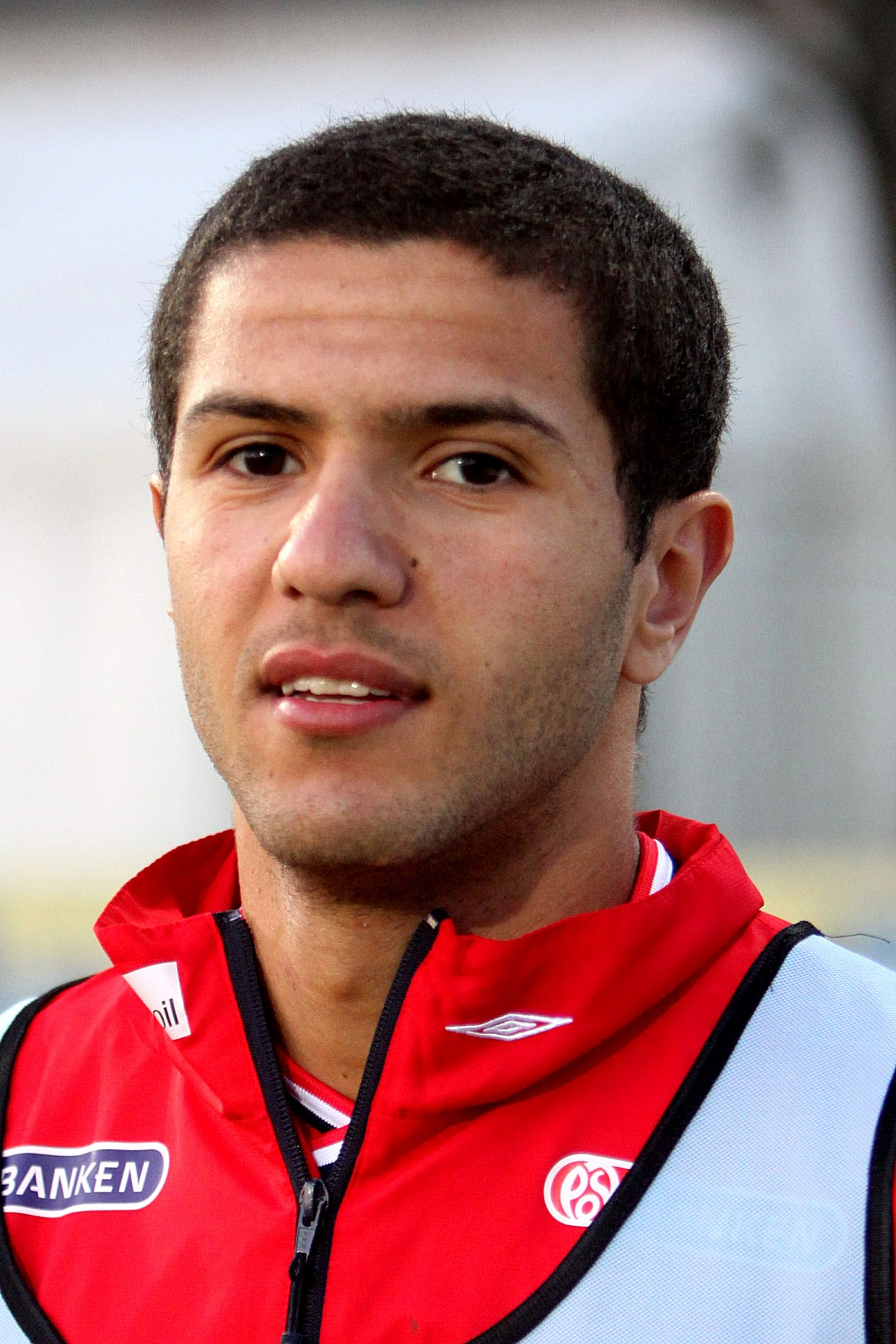

Personal information
- Full name: Amin Mimoun Nouri
- Date of birth: 10 January 1990 (age 36)
- Place of birth: Oslo, Norway
- Height: 1.80 m (5 ft 11 in)
- Position: Right back

Team information
- Current team: KFUM Oslo
- Number: 33

Youth career
- 2003–2008: Klemetsrud (no)

Senior career*
Years	Team	Apps	(Gls)
2008–2011	Vålerenga	47	(0)
2008	→ Nybergsund (loan)	1	(0)
2011–2014	Start	84	(1)
2015–2017	Brann	87	(1)
2018–2021	Vålerenga	35	(2)
2019	→ Oostende (loan)	12	(0)
2020	→ HamKam (loan)	15	(1)
2021	Sogndal	11	(0)
2022–2023	HamKam	26	(1)
2024–	KFUM Oslo	54	(2)

International career^{‡}
2005	Norway U15	7	(0)
2006	Norway U16	13	(3)
2007	Norway U17	14	(2)
2007–2008	Norway U18	8	(0)
2008–2009	Norway U19	10	(0)
2009–2011	Norway U21	11	(0)
2013–2014	Norway U23	3	(0)
- * Club domestic league appearances and goals as of 23 July 2026 ‡ National team caps and goals as of 14 October 2014

Amin Mimoun Nouri (born 10 January 1990) is a Norwegian professional footballer who currently plays for KFUM Oslo. He can play as a full back or as a midfielder.

== Career ==
On 16 July 2011 he was traded to Start from Vålerenga.

In February 2024 Nouri signed for newly promoted Eliteserien team KFUM Oslo on a one season long contract.

== International career ==
Nouri has represented Norway internationally at various youth levels. He hasn't played for Norway at senior level and remains eligible to play for the country of his parents, Morocco.

== Career statistics ==
As of 10 November 2025

Club	Season	League			National cup (Note: Includes Norwegian Cup, Belgian Cup)		Europe		Other		Total	
Club	Season	Division	Apps	Goals	Apps	Goals	Apps	Goals	Apps	Goals	Apps	Goals
Vålerenga	2008	Eliteserien	2	0	0	0	—		—		2	0
Vålerenga	2009	Eliteserien	19	0	0	0	2 (Note: Appearance(s) in UEFA Europa League)	0	—		21	0
Vålerenga	2010	Eliteserien	24	0	0	0	—		—		24	0
Vålerenga	2011	Eliteserien	2	0	0	0	1	0	—		3	0
Vålerenga	Total		47	0	0	0	3	0	—		50	0
Nybergsund (loan)	2008	1. divisjon	1	0	0	0	—		—		1	0
Start	2011	Eliteserien	13	0	1	0	—		—		14	0
Start	2012	1. divisjon	28	0	4	0	—		—		32	0
Start	2013	Eliteserien	21	0	4	0	—		—		25	0
Start	2014	Eliteserien	22	1	4	0	—		—		26	1
Start	Total		84	1	13	0	—		—		97	1
Brann	2015	1. divisjon	30	0	3	0	—		—		33	0
Brann	2016	Eliteserien	30	0	0	0	—		—		30	0
Brann	2017	Eliteserien	27	1	3	0	2	0	1 (Note: Appearance in Mesterfinalen)	0	33	1
Brann	Total		87	1	6	0	2	0	1	0	96	1
Vålerenga	2018	Eliteserien	30	2	4	0	—		—		34	2
Vålerenga	2019	Eliteserien	4	0	0	0	—		—		4	0
Vålerenga	2020	Eliteserien	1	0	—		—		—		1	0
Vålerenga	2021	Eliteserien	0	0	0	0	—		—		0	0
Vålerenga	Total		35	2	4	0	—		—		39	2
Oostende (loan)	2018–19	Belgian First Division A	12	0	2	0	—		—		14	0
HamKam (loan)	2020	1. divisjon	15	1	—		—		—		15	1
Sogndal	2021	1. divisjon	11	0	1	0	—		1	0	13	0
HamKam	2022	Eliteserien	20	1	2	1	—		—		22	1
HamKam	2023	Eliteserien	6	0	4	0	—		—		10	0
HamKam	Total		26	1	6	1	—		—		32	1
KFUM Oslo	2024	Eliteserien	23	1	5	0	—		—		28	1
KFUM Oslo	2025	Eliteserien	23	1	6	0	—		—		29	1
KFUM Oslo	Total		46	2	11	0	—		—		57	2
Career total			342	8	33	1	5	0	1	0	381	9
