= Rolf Daniel Vikstøl =

Norwegian footballer (born 1989)

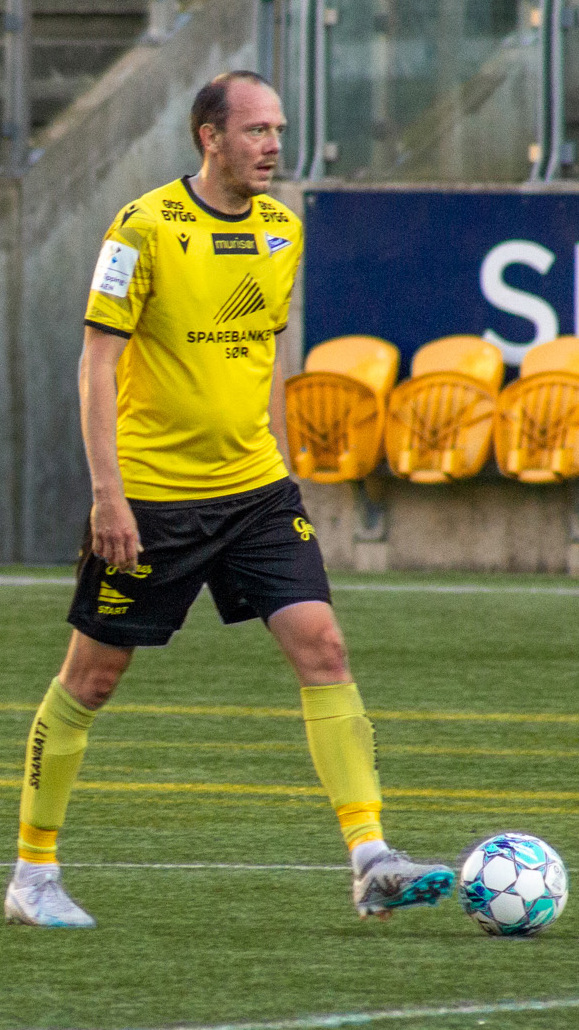

Personal information
- Full name: Rolf Daniel Vikstøl
- Date of birth: 22 February 1989 (age 37)
- Place of birth: Kristiansand, Norway
- Height: 1.84 m (6 ft 0 in)
- Position: Left-back

Youth career
- –2005: Våg
- 2006–2008: Start

Senior career*
Years	Team	Apps	(Gls)
2007–2017	Start	217	(14)
2018–2022	Viking	85	(5)
2023	Start	17	(0)
2024	Våg	4	(0)

International career
2007	Norway U18	3	(0)
2008	Norway U19	1	(0)
2013	Norway U23	1	(0)
- * Club domestic league appearances and goals

Rolf Daniel Vikstøl (born 22 February 1989) is a Norwegian former footballer who played as a defender for IK Start and Viking FK.

== Career ==
After previously playing for the club Våg, he came to Start in 2006, and played occasional games for the first team in the 2008 season. On 9 March 2018, he signed a two-year deal with Viking. He left the club after the 2022 season. On 21 March 2023, he returned to Start on a one-year contract. He retired after the 2023 season.

== Career statistics ==
Appearances and goals by club, season and competition
Club	Season	League			Cup		Continental		Other		Total	
Club	Season	Division	Apps	Goals	Apps	Goals	Apps	Goals	Apps	Goals	Apps	Goals
Start	2007	Eliteserien	0	0	1	0	—		—		1	0
Start	2008	1. divisjon	7	0	0	0	—		—		7	0
Start	2009	Eliteserien	7	1	3	0	—		—		10	1
Start	2010	Eliteserien	26	3	5	0	—		—		31	3
Start	2011	Eliteserien	28	1	5	0	—		—		33	1
Start	2012	1. divisjon	28	1	4	1	—		—		32	2
Start	2013	Eliteserien	28	3	4	0	—		—		32	3
Start	2014	Eliteserien	27	2	3	0	—		—		30	2
Start	2015	Eliteserien	26	3	1	0	—		1 (Note: Appearance in relegation play-offs)	0	28	3
Start	2016	Eliteserien	21	0	3	1	—		—		24	1
Start	2017	1. divisjon	19	0	2	0	—		—		21	0
Start	Total		217	14	31	2	—		1	0	249	16
Viking	2018	1. divisjon	17	1	0	0	—		—		17	1
Viking	2019	Eliteserien	16	1	4	1	—		—		20	2
Viking	2020	Eliteserien	18	1	—		1 (Note: Appearance in UEFA Europa League)	0	—		19	1
Viking	2021	Eliteserien	22	1	3	1	—		—		25	2
Viking	2022	Eliteserien	12	1	3	0	4 (Note: Appearances in UEFA Europa Conference League)	0	—		19	1
Viking	Total		85	5	10	2	5	0	—		100	7
Start	2023	1. divisjon	17	0	3	0	—		—		20	0
Våg	2024	4. divisjon	4	0	0	0	—		—		4	0
Career total			323	19	44	4	5	0	1	0	373	23

== Honours ==
Start

- 1. divisjon: 2012

Viking

- 1. divisjon: 2018
- Norwegian Football Cup: 2019
