= Babacar Sarr =

Senegalese footballer and international fugitive

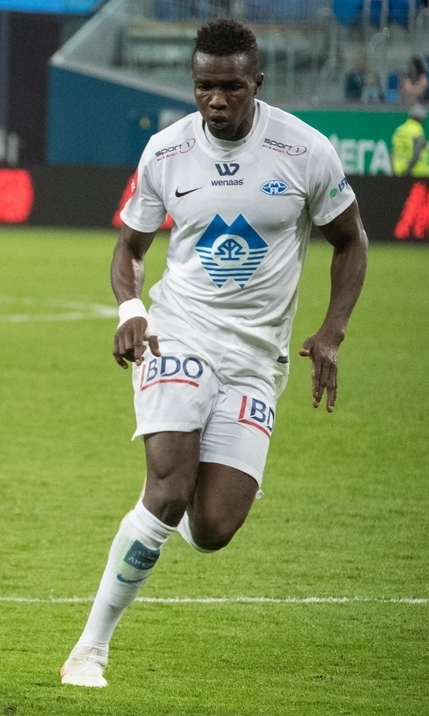
- Sarr with Molde in 2018

Personal information
- Date of birth: 15 February 1991 (age 35)
- Place of birth: Senegal
- Height: 1.89 m (6 ft 2 1/2 in)
- Position: Midfielder

Senior career*
| Years | Team | Apps | (Gls) |
| 2011–2012 | Selfoss | 38 | (3) |
| 2012 | → Bastia (loan) | 3 | (0) |
| 2013–2014 | Start | 36 | (1) |
| 2014–2016 | Sogndal | 55 | (6) |
| 2016–2019 | Molde | 65 | (5) |
| 2019 | Yenisey Krasnoyarsk | 13 | (1) |
| 2019–2020 | Damac | 13 | (0) |
- * Club domestic league appearances and goals

Babacar Sar (born 15 February 1991) is a Senegalese former professional footballer, who is most known for the two separate rape accusations he has against him from two different women in Norway, for which he is wanted by Interpol due to the lack of presence in the trials.

== Career ==
Sarr started his professional career at Icelandic team Selfoss, before being loaned out to French side CA Bastia in 2012.

In December 2012, Sarr signed a four-year contract with Norwegian club Start. He made his debut on 17 March 2013 against Hønefoss, helping his team to a 3–2 win.

On 13 July 2014, Sarr signed for Norwegian side Sogndal, playing there for two seasons before signing for Molde. He was released from his contract with Molde by mutual consent on 18 January 2019.

On 5 February 2019, Sarr signed for Yenisey Krasnoyarsk. On 3 March 2019, in his Yenisey debut, he scored a late equalizer in a 1–1 game against FC Rostov. Following Yenisey's relegation from the Russian Premier League at the end of the 2018–19 season, Sarr was released by the club.

Just hours after Norwegian police declared him internationally wanted, Damac of the Saudi Professional League announced his signature on 11 June 2019.

== Rape trial ==
In July 2024, media said that [one of the two] prosecuting authorities in Norway, have made a 5 year extension, for bringing Babacar to justice; The warrant for his arrest is due to expire in 2029.

Earlier (and as of 2023), he is an international fugitive wanted for failing to appear in appellate court in Norway, after he was acquitted in the lower court, regarding the rape charge.

In August 2018 at Molde District Court, Sarr was acquitted of one case of rape whilst a player of Molde. In 2023 media quoted the court verdict: the accuser woke up, "wearing a top, a jacket and a handbag (shoulder bag). The strap of the handbag was over her one shoulder, on the outer surface of the jacket [...] The possibility of Sarr [... and her] having had intercourse [...] while Visnes [the accuser] was dressed like that, is quite unlikely". He was then sentenced to pay reparation to the woman.

As of 2021, the case is under appeal. He is wanted by Interpol as of 2023; the international arrest warrant, is scheduled to run until 2025. In 2021, media wrote that Sarr no longer resides in Saudi Arabia.

In March 2020, the Supreme Court rejected the appeal from Sarr, who was sentenced to pay 150.000 Kroner in compensation to the woman in this rape case. The compensation judgement is thus final.

Accusation that did not make it to trial

In February 2020, Sarr was again accused of a rape; the allegation was that a crime took place in November 2018, after Molde played an away match against Sandefjord. This case was dropped at the end of February 2020 because the police had not informed Sarr that the investigation against him had resumed within the statutory deadline of three months.

== Career statistics ==
As of match played 11 January 2020

| Club | Season | Division | League | | Cup | | League Cup | | Europe | | Total | |
| Club | Season | Division | Apps | Goals | Apps | Goals | Apps | Goals | Apps | Goals | Apps | Goals |
|---|---|---|---|---|---|---|---|---|---|---|---|---|
| Selfoss | 2011 | 1. deild karla | 17 | 2 | 2 | 0 | 3 | 0 | — | | 22 | 2 |
| Selfoss | 2012 | Úrvalsdeild | 21 | 1 | 2 | 0 | 4 | 0 | — | | 27 | 1 |
| Selfoss | Total | | 38 | 3 | 4 | 0 | 7 | 0 | — | — | 49 | 3 |
| CA Bastia (loan) | 2011-12 | Championnat de France Amateur | 3 | 0 | 0 | 0 | 0 | 0 | — | | 3 | 0 |
| Start | 2013 | Tippeligaen | 23 | 0 | 5 | 0 | — | | — | | 28 | 0 |
| Start | 2014 | Tippeligaen | 13 | 1 | 4 | 0 | — | | — | | 17 | 1 |
| Start | Total | | 36 | 1 | 9 | 0 | — | — | — | — | 45 | 1 |
| Sogndal | 2014 | Tippeligaen | 11 | 0 | 0 | 0 | — | | — | | 11 | 0 |
| Sogndal | 2015 | OBOS-ligaen | 29 | 4 | 3 | 0 | — | | — | | 32 | 0 |
| Sogndal | 2016 | Tippeligaen | 15 | 2 | 3 | 1 | — | | — | | 18 | 3 |
| Sogndal | Total | | 55 | 6 | 6 | 1 | — | — | — | — | 61 | 6 |
| Molde | 2016 | Tippeligaen | 13 | 0 | 0 | 0 | — | | 0 | 0 | 13 | 0 |
| Molde | 2017 | Eliteserien | 25 | 1 | 5 | 0 | — | | — | | 30 | 1 |
| Molde | 2018 | Eliteserien | 27 | 4 | 2 | 0 | — | | 7 | 1 | 36 | 5 |
| Molde | Total | | 65 | 5 | 7 | 0 | — | — | 7 | 1 | 79 | 6 |
| Yenisey Krasnoyarsk | 2018–19 | Russian Premier League | 13 | 1 | 0 | 0 | — | | — | | 13 | 1 |
| Damac | 2019–20 | Saudi Professional League | 13 | 0 | 0 | 0 | — | | — | | 13 | 0 |
| Career total | | | 223 | 16 | 26 | 1 | 7 | 0 | 7 | 1 | 263 | 18 |
