= Kjell Kosberg =

Norwegian architect (born 1953)

Coordinates: 62.7375°N 7.1591°E

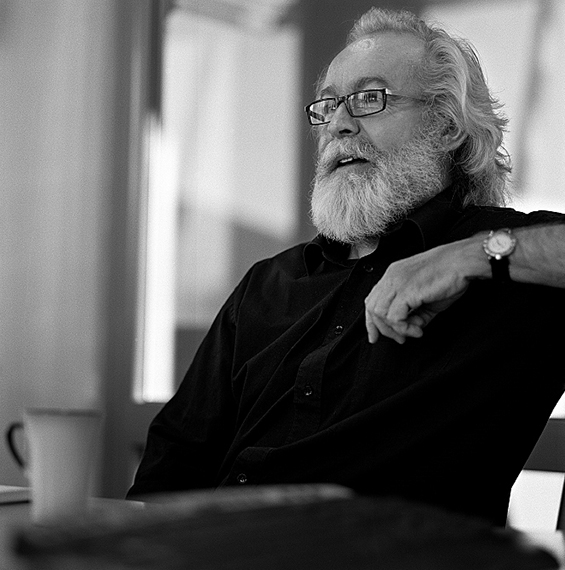

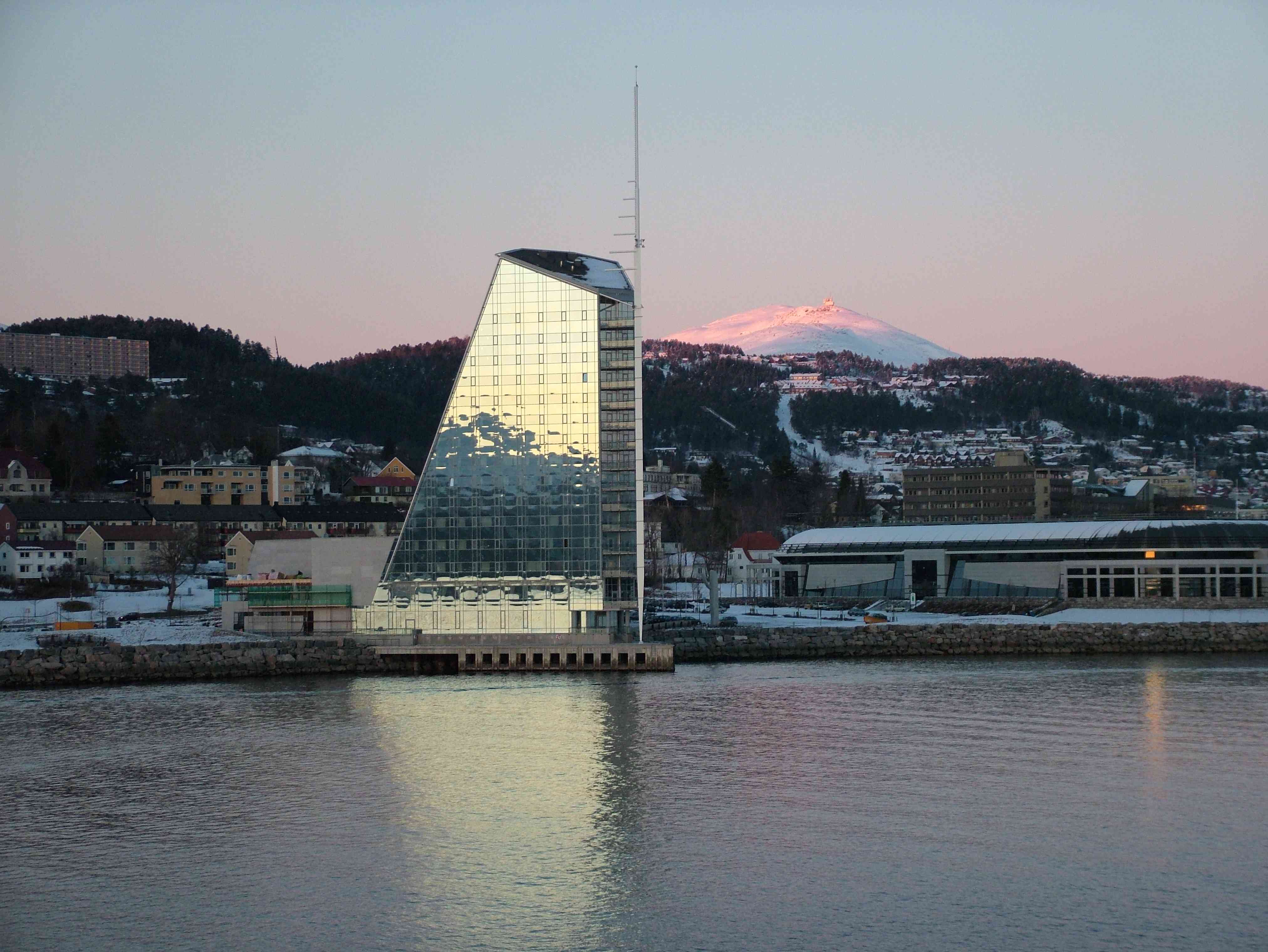
Rica Seilet Hotel and Aker Stadion in Molde

Kjell Kosberg (born 8 April 1953) is a Norwegian architect. He established Kosbergs Arkitektkontor in Molde in 1986. He established an office in Oslo in 1994, which was later merged with the Molde office. He has designed a large number of buildings in Molde, including Plassen, Aker Stadion (1998), Rica Seilet Hotel (2002), Bjørnsonhuset (2002), as well as Sør Arena, Briskeby Arena and Quality Oslo Airport Hotel, among others.

== Projects ==
=== Scandic Seilet Hotel ===
Scandic Seilet (formerly Rica Seilet Hotel) is a high-rise hotel located in the town of Molde in Molde Municipality, Møre og Romsdal county, Norway.

The hotel was opened on 11 September 2002. After acquisition by Scandic Hotels, the hotel name was changed to Scandic Seilet. It is designed by Kosberg. At 16 floors and 82 metres (269 ft), it is the tallest building in the town of Molde.

The tower of the hotel has become a popular local attraction. The hotel contains 224 rooms, 10 meeting rooms, a lobby bar and a 24/7 shop. Next to the hotel and sharing the same entrance with the hotel, lies Bjørnsonhuset, a combined cultural and convention center. Bjørnsonsplassen is situated in front of the hotel with a parking lot built in stones, surrounded by a rose garden. The hotel overlooks Moldefjord.
