= Sør Arena =

Football stadium in Torsvika, Norway

Sparebanken Sør Arena
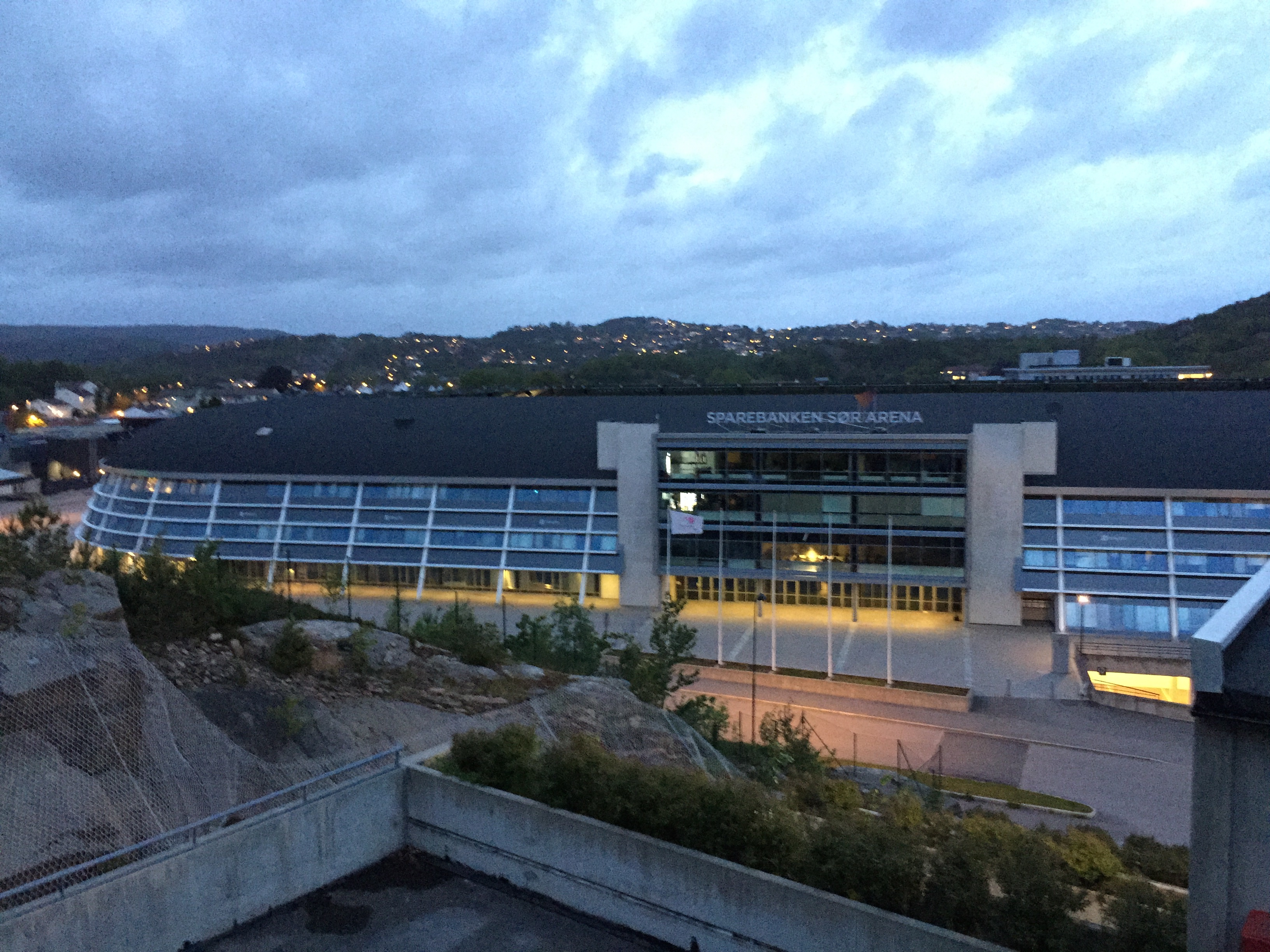
- Interactive map of Sparebanken Sør Arena
- Location: Torsvika, Kristiansand, Norway
- Coordinates: 58°9′13″N 8°1′43″E
- Owner: Kristiansand Kommune
- Operator: Sørlandshallen Eiendom AS
- Capacity: 14,563
- Surface: Artificial grass
- Record attendance: 14,448

Construction
- Groundbreaking: 11 January 2006
- Opened: 15 April 2007
- Cost: NOK 400 million
- Architect: Kjell Kosberg

Tenant
- IK Start (2007–)

Sparebanken Sør Arena ("South Arena") is a football stadium located at Torsvika in Kristiansand, Norway. The all-seater stadium has a capacity of 14,563 spectators, and serves as the home ground of Tippeligaen side IK Start. It was designed by Kjell Kosberg, and is architecturally similar to Aker Stadion. The venue has seen concerts by Elton John, Dolly Parton and A-ha, among others.. UEFA refers to the stadium as Kristiansand Arena.

Construction started in 2006, and the stadium officially opened on 15 April 2007, replacing Kristiansand Stadion as Start's home ground. The venue cost 400 million Norwegian krone (NOK), of which the stadium itself cost NOK 250 million, after significant cost overruns. While originally planned with artificial turf, the venue was ultimately built with a natural grass pitch. The venue and the holding company Start Stadion were taken over by Sparebanken Sør, the main creditor, in 2008. They subsequently also took over Start Toppfotball, the company running the club. Both companies were sold to Ernst Ravnaas in 2009. Following decreased attendance, ahead of the 2011 season the seating on the corners was sold as advertisement space and the maximum capacity has artificially been reduced to 11,700.

== History ==
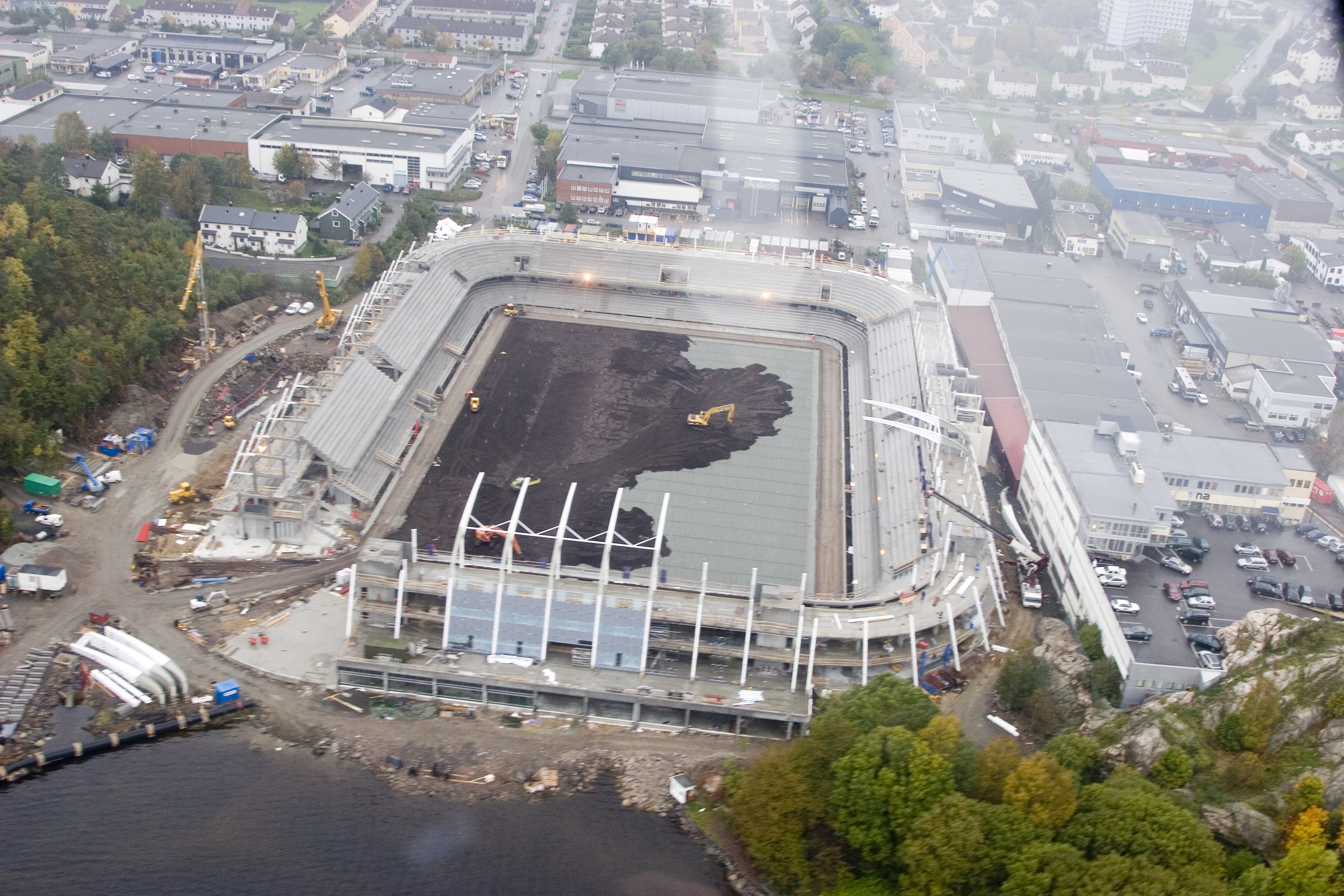
Sør Arena during construction

Traditionally, Start has played their home games at Kristiansand Stadion, a municipal multi-purpose stadium. In May 2005, the municipal council approved the plans for a new stadium for Start. At the time, the structure was estimated to cost NOK 177 million, of which NOK 120 million would be for the stadium itself, while the remaining would be for commercial properties.

The club held an architecture competition, and received six bids. On 28 September 2005, Start Toppfotball announced that they had selected the design by Kjell Kosberg from Kosbergs Arkitektkontor, who had previously designed Aker Stadion and Briskeby Arena. The default proposal contained a spectator capacity for 9,948 people, but the plans were scalable, allowing for increased capacity if the club so wanted. Ernst Ravnaas, co-owner of the club, stated that given the recent high attendance, he wanted to build a larger stadium than the default proposal. Financing was planned with a free lot from Kristiansand Municipality, a NOK 40 million loan from the municipality, a NOK 20 million grant from Cultiva, a municipal culture fund, NOK 20 in value added tax refund, NOK 10 to 20 million in naming rights, the sale of commercial property, NOK 30 to 40 million in a bank loan, and the remaining with share capital from Start Toppfotball.

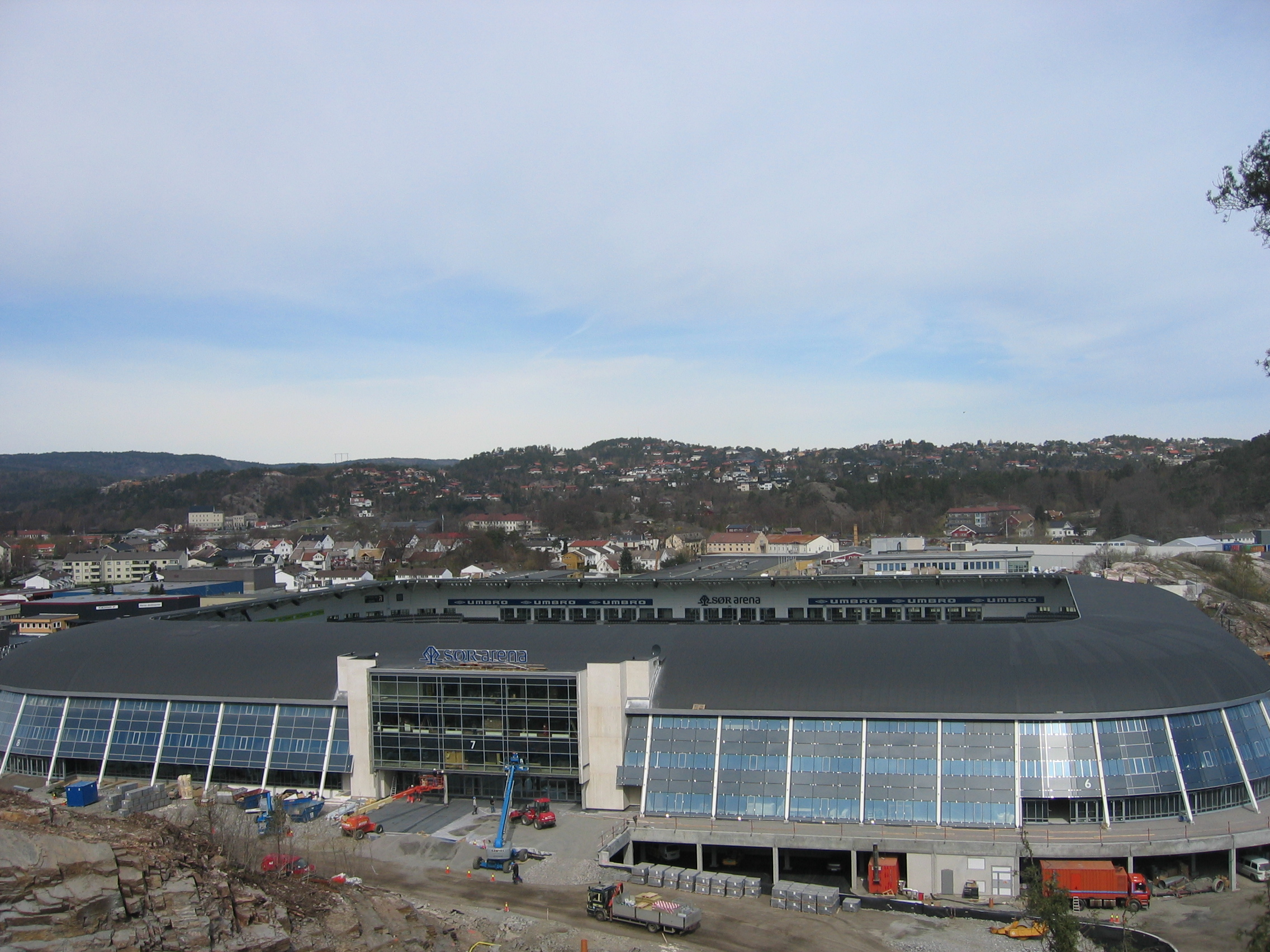
During construction

In October, the club stated that they hoped to finance a further expansion of the stadium to 14,000 seats by selling part of the lot to a private developer, which would use it to build a 17-story building. On 23 December, Rasmussengruppen signed a contract where they bought shares worth NOK 45 million in Start Toppfotball. In addition, they paid NOK 15 million for the right to build 11,000 square meters (120,000 sq ft) of commercial property in conjunction with the stadium, and an option to purchase the high-rise lot for NOK 25 million. The high-rise lot was again bought from the municipality for NOK 15 million. Combined with the free lot for the stadium, Start Toppfotball received municipal subsidies of NOK 25 million for constructing the venue.

A controversy arose regarding whether to lay natural or artificial turf. Kristofer Hæstad, one of Start's star players, stated that he would not continue to play for the club if artificial turf was laid. The contract with the municipality stated that the stadium would have to be built with artificial turf. In March, Start decided that they would instead lay natural grass, and if necessary pay the municipality for the cost of building another artificial turf venue. The name of the venue was announced on 21 October, after the club had signed a ten-year naming rights agreement with Sparebanken Sør worth NOK 35 million. The rights to sell the naming rights were first transferred from the stadium owner to the company Rettighetskompaniet AS, which subsequently sold these to Sparebanken Sør.

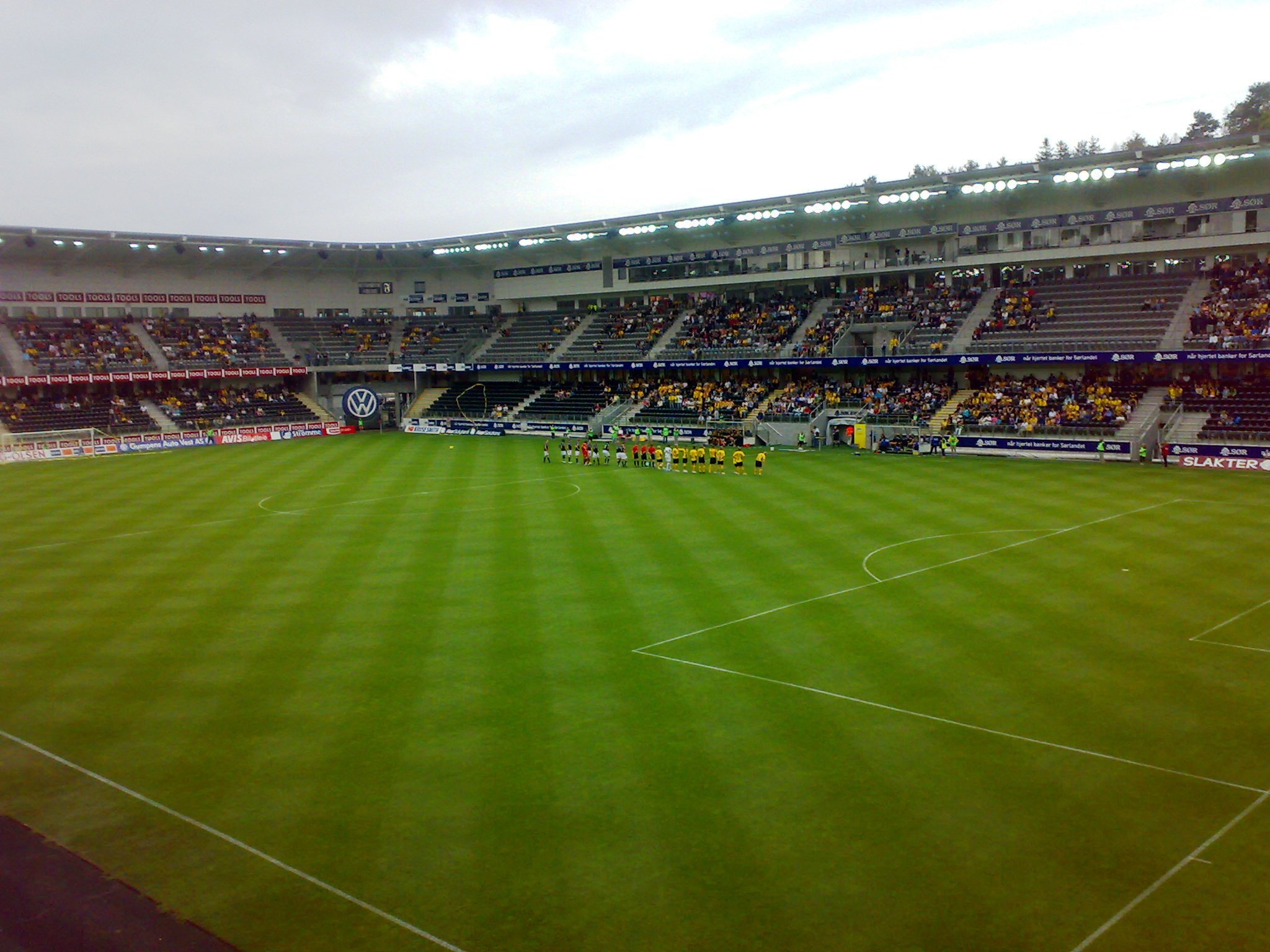
The pitch

Construction of the stadium was subject to significant cost overruns. These were mostly caused by the increased size of both spectator and commercial area, increased standard to VIP facilities, a general increase in construction costs, and the deadline to finish the venue in time for the league to start. Total investments exceeded NOK 400 million, of which 250 million was paid for by Start. This resulted in the stadium company having a debt of NOK 173 million, in addition to NOK 60 million in share equity. In November 2007, Start sold 2,500 square meters (27,000 sq ft) of commercial space at the stadium for NOK 25 million to finance part of the cost overrun.

The opening of the stadium took place on 15 April 2007, in the season's first league game, against Viking. The game attracted 14,448 spectators, a record attendance and the only time the venue has been sold out. After the opening, the pitch was the worst in the league, and by May the grass within the penalty areas and along the one side had been replaced. By 2010, the pitch quality had improved and was regarded as "world class" by the Start players. The cost of preparing the pitch, including snow removal, ahead of the season is about NOK 500,000. Ahead of the 2008 season, the 1,400 club seats had to be replaced for a cost of NOK 1.5 million, because the wood in the chairs were rotting. The reason was that the chairs were designed for in-door use, and the necessary precautions to protect them when not in use had not been taken.

The stadium had a book value of NOK 230 million, way over the real value, causing Start Toppfotball to have to write down the investment. To finance this, Sparebanken Sør, the main creditor, bought Start Stadion from Start Toppfotball for NOK 2,600 on 23 December 2008. At the same time, the club signed a 40-year agreement to lease the stadium from Sparebanken Sør for NOK 12 million per year. On 7 March 2009, the bank also bought the remaining shares of Start Toppfotball, becoming the sole owner of both the club and the stadium. Sparebanken Sør offered to sell Sparebanken Sør Arena to the municipality for NOK 100 million, but the municipality rejected this on 29 May. The bank subsequently sold Start Stadion and Start Toppfotball to Ravnaas on 25 June for NOK 1 each. Start Stadion had at the time a debt of NOK 34 million to Start Toppfotball, NOK 60 million to Sparebanken Sør and NOK 40 million to Kristiansand Municipality. Sparebanken Sør lost NOK 80 million in their transactions with Start and Sparebanken Sør Arena.

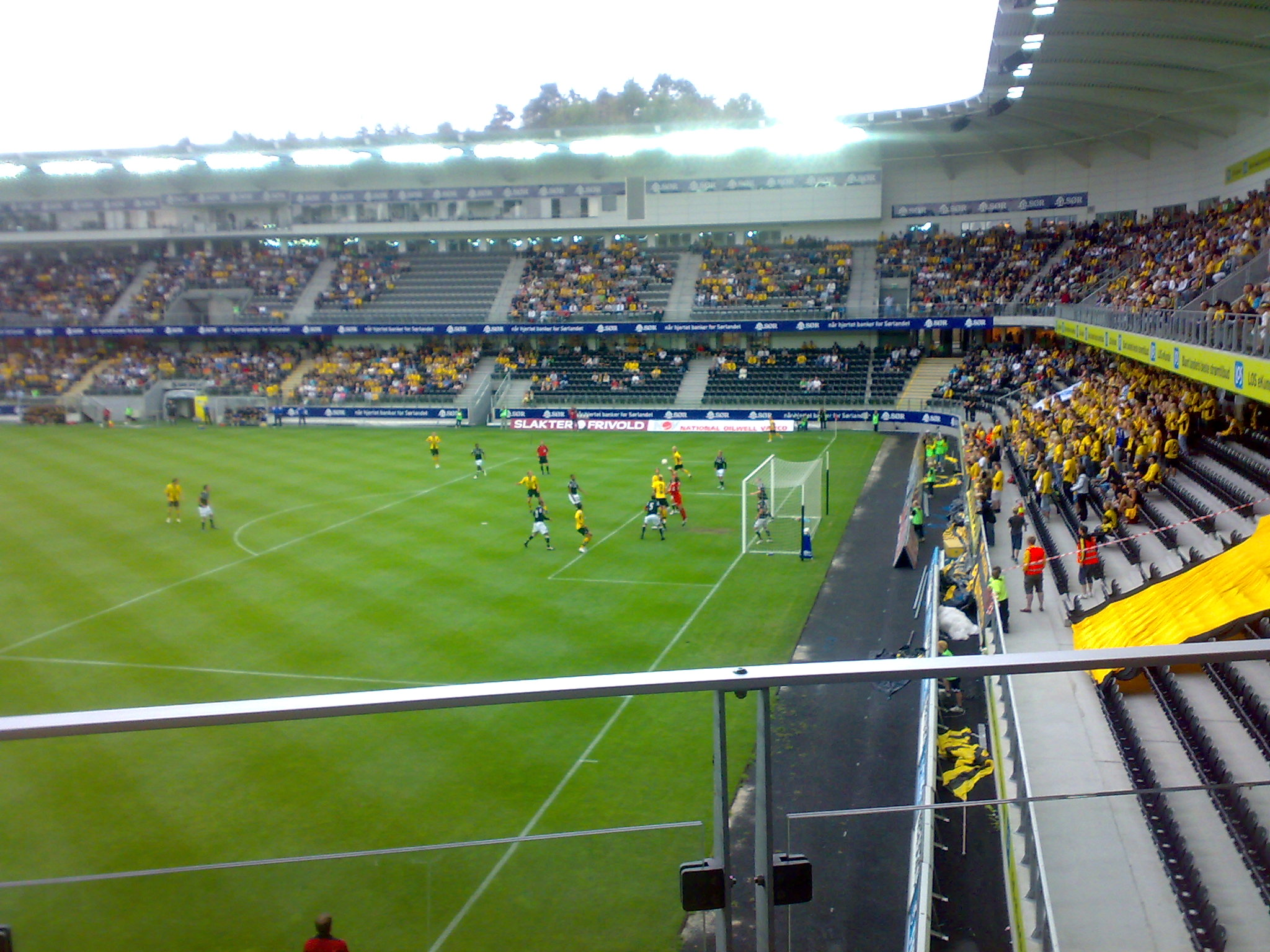
Inside view

Following a fall in game attendance in 2009 and 2010, Start decided ahead of the 2011 season to reduce the stadium's capacity. Advertisement banners were sold to cover the corners, thus reducing the capacity to 11,700 tickets. The club stated that the intention was to move spectators closer together to increase the atmosphere, and at the same time making it easier to sell out the stadium. In February 2012, Kristiansand District Court sentenced Start to pay NOK 6.4 million in value added tax on the naming rights. The club stated that they believed the naming rights were exempt. After the 2011 season, Start was again relegated to the First Division. In an attempt to better the club's financial situation, Start agreed to lay artificial turf on Sparebanken Sør Arena, in exchange for NOK 250,000 in municipal funding to use the stadium for recreational sports. Removal of the natural pitch started on 28 May 2012.

Start won the 2012 Norwegian First Division and were promoted to the top league for their 2013 season. Start Stadion had been involved in a legal suit with the Norwegian Tax Administration over whether value added tax was to be paid for the stadium's naming rights. The company lost the case both in Agder Court of Appeal and the Supreme Court, resulting in the company having to pay NOK 9 million in taxes. As the company did not have such values, it was forced to file for bankruptcy on 23 May 2013. At the time the company had a debt of NOK 107 million. At the time the municipality has commenced negotiations with Sparebanken Sør to purchase the stadium. Football economist Tor Geir Kvinen stated that Sparebanken Sør had by then spent NOK 200 million on subsidizing Start and that in reality the municipality and bank were funding the repeated deficits in the club. The municipality announced a plan in October 2013, whereby they would purchase the bank's NOK 54 million loan for NOK 44 million and receive all the shares in the stadium company. The bank would then buy the naming rights for ten more years for NOK 10 million and yet unsold commercial property. The municipality would then be owed NOK 64 million by the stadium company, up from NOK 46 million.

== Facilities ==
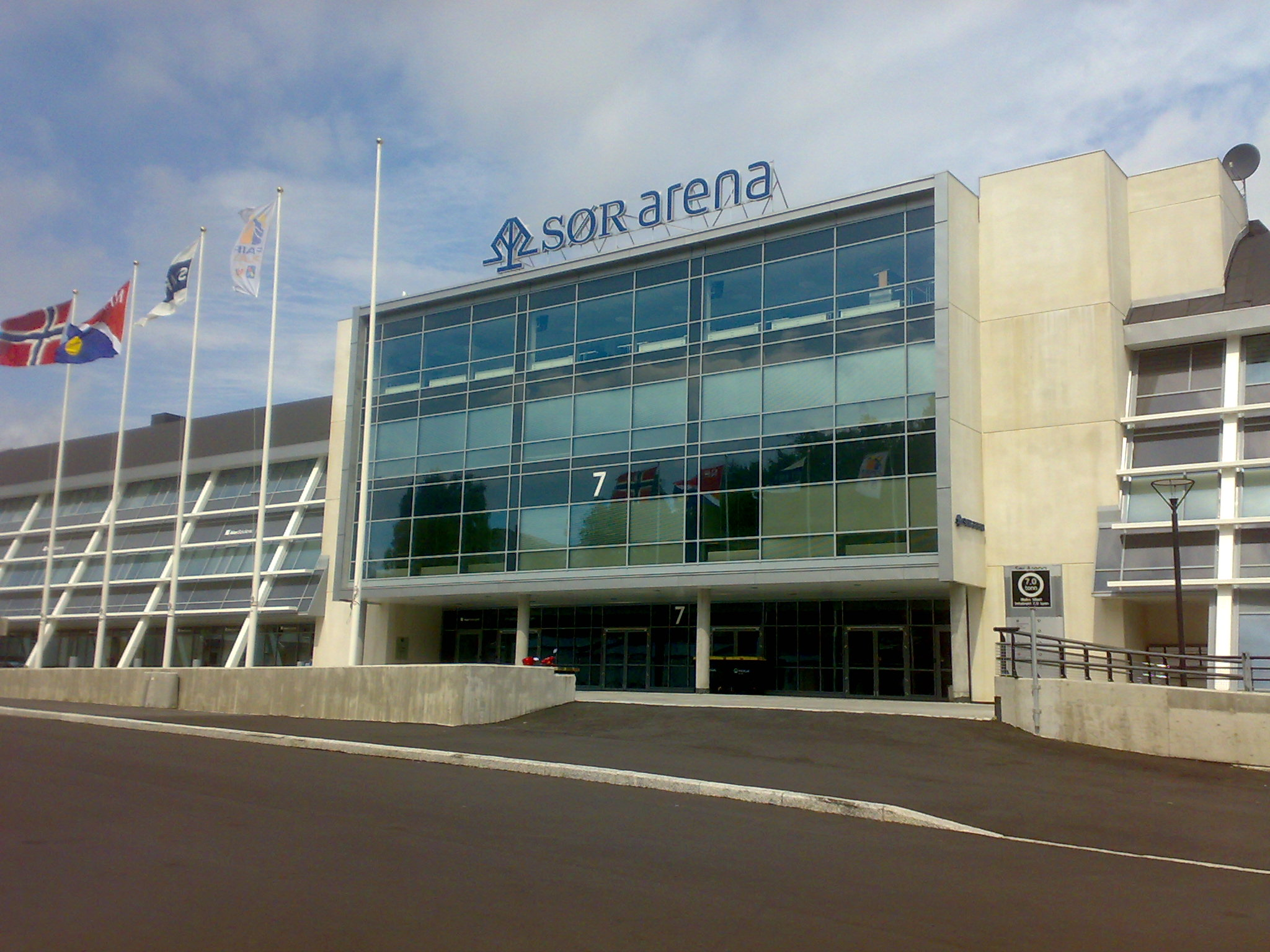
Main facade

The stadium has a capacity for 14,563 spectators, of which 1,400 are club seating. However, the seating is artificially reduced to 11,700. Built into the stadium is 22,000 square meters (240,000 sq ft) of commercial property. The venue has many architectural similarities with Aker Stadion, home of Molde FK, which was also designed by Kosberg. During one winter, the pitch was accidentally converted to a bandy field, when it was covered with a layer of ice up to 10 centimeters (4 in) thick because of cold weather.

== Events ==
The Norway national under-21 football team won 2–0 over Estonia at Sparebanken Sør Arena on 20 November 2007. The stadium hosted a UEFA Women's Euro 2009 qualifying match on 3 May 2008, in which Norway beat Israel 7–0. The final in the 2011–13 International Challenge Trophy was held at the stadium on 14 August 2013, in which the Norway national under-23 football team lost 0–1 in extra time against Turkey A2.

Concerts held at the stadium have included Elton John in 2007, which attracted a crowd of 19,000, Dolly Parton in 2008 and A-ha in 2010. A 2008 tour with artists from Norske Talenter and Idol attracted only 800 people, including free entrants. From 2011, the finals in PlussbankCup, a junior football tournament held in Kristiansand, are hosted at Sparebanken Sør Arena.

The following list shows the average, maximum and minimum attendance for Start's home games in Eliteserien. It also gives the rank among the average attendance for the Eliteserien teams. Years in the First Division are indicated with a dagger (†).

Attendance
Season	Avg	Min	Max	Rank	Ref
2007	11,216	9,056	14,448	6	
2008	7,455	5,885	13,329	1†	
2009	8,288	6,627	10,793	8	
2010	8,390	6,412	10,903	7	
2011	7,056	5,128	11,419	9	
2012	4,373	3,437	5,760	1†	
2013	6,183	4,729	10,345	8	
2014	5,962	4,768	8,555	9	
2015	6,155	4,683	9,239	8	
2016	4,466	3,401	7,273	11	
2017	4,092	2,896	8,066	1†	
