= Fernando Paniagua =

Costa Rican footballer (born 1988)

Personal information
- Full name: Fernando Paniagua Marchena
- Date of birth: September 9, 1988 (age 38)
- Place of birth: Nicoya, Costa Rica
- Height: 1.77 m (5 ft 10 in)
- Position: Midfielder

Team information
- Current team: UCR

Senior career*
| Years | Team | Apps | (Gls) |
| 2006–2013 | Deportivo Saprissa | 53 | (0) |
| 2013 | Santos de Guápiles | 12 | (0) |
| 2013–2014 | UCR | 29 | (2) |
| 2014–2015 | Start | 15 | (0) |
| 2015– | UCR | 9 | (0) |
- * Club domestic league appearances and goals as of 11 August 2015

Fernando Paniagua Marchena (born 9 September 1988) is a Costa Rican football midfielder who plays for CF Universidad de Costa Rica

== Career ==
In March 2014, Paniagua signed a three-year contract with Tippeligaen side Start. After a year with Start, Paniagua and Start agreed to mutually terminates Paniagua's contract at the end of March 2015.

=== Career statistics ===
As of match played 26 October 2014

| Season | Club | Division | League | | Cup | | Continental | | Total | |
| Season | Club | Division | Apps | Goals | Apps | Goals | Apps | Goals | Apps | Goals |
|---|---|---|---|---|---|---|---|---|---|---|
| 2009–10 | Deportivo Saprissa | Costa Rican FPD | 27 | 0 | - | | 2 | 0 | 29 | 0 |
| 2010–11 | Deportivo Saprissa | Costa Rican FPD | 5 | 0 | - | | 3 | 0 | 8 | 0 |
| 2011–12 | Deportivo Saprissa | Costa Rican FPD | 2 | 0 | - | | - | | 2 | 0 |
| 2012–13 | Deportivo Saprissa | Costa Rican FPD | 6 | 0 | - | | - | | 6 | 0 |
| 2012–13 | Santos de Guápiles | Costa Rican FPD | 12 | 0 | - | | - | | 12 | 0 |
| 2013–14 | UCR | Costa Rican FPD | 29 | 2 | - | | - | | 29 | 2 |
| 2014 | Start | Tippeligaen | 15 | 0 | 1 | 0 | - | | 16 | 0 |
| 2015–16 | UCR | Costa Rican FPD | 2 | 0 | - | | - | | 2 | 0 |
| Career Total | | | 98 | 2 | 1 | 0 | 5 | 0 | 104 | 2 |
