= Magne Kristiansen =

Norwegian-American electrical engineer

Magne “Kris” Kristiansen (April 14, 1932 - May 9, 2017) was an electrical engineer and the P. W. Horn Professor and emeritus Professor at Texas Tech University, formerly the C. B. Thornton Professor from 1990 to 2009. He is member of the National Society of Professional Engineers, American Physical Society, American Association for the Advancement of Science, Institute of Electrical and Electronics Engineers (Life Fellow) and Russian Academy of Science.

== Early life ==
Born to parents Ella and Martin Kristiansen in Elverum, Norway, he joined the Royal Norwegian Air Force in 1950. Upon leaving the Air Force, he came to the US where he completed a doctorate in Electrical Engineering at the University of Texas.
