= Glenn Andersen =

Norwegian footballer (born 1980)

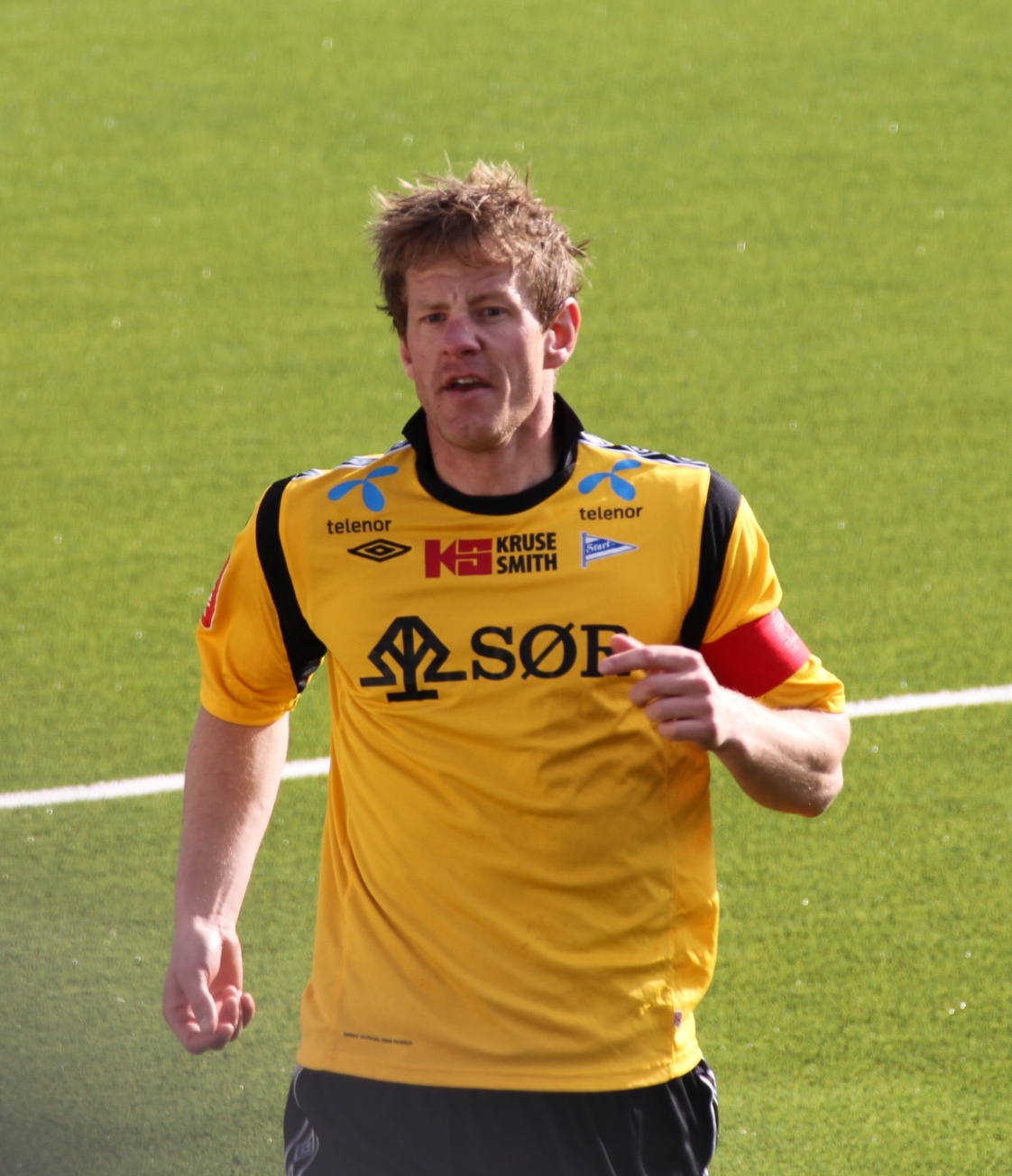
- Andersen playing against Mjøndalen IF, May 2012.

Personal information
- Full name: Glenn Brevik Andersen
- Date of birth: 5 April 1980 (age 46)
- Place of birth: Arendal, Norway
- Height: 1.88 m (6 ft 2 in)
- Position: Defender

Senior career*
Years	Team	Apps	(Gls)
2002–2003	Ørn-Horten	58	(10)
2004–2005	Start	25	(0)
2006–2012	Strømsgodset	164	(11)
2012–2014	Start	74	(9)
2015–2018	Jerv	116	(13)
Total		437	(43)
- * Club domestic league appearances and goals

Glenn Brevik Andersen (born 5 April 1980) is a retired Norwegian footballer. He has previously played for Ørn-Horten, Strømsgodset and Start.

== Retirement ==
Andersen retired after the 2018 season.

== Career statistics ==
Season	Club	Division	League		Cup		Total	
Season	Club	Division	Apps	Goals	Apps	Goals	Apps	Goals
2002	Ørn-Horten	Adeccoligaen	29	6	0	0	29	6
2003	Ørn-Horten	Adeccoligaen	29	4	4	1	33	5
2004	Start	Adeccoligaen	16	0	0	0	16	0
2005	Start	Tippeligaen	9	0	1	0	10	0
2006	Strømsgodset	Adeccoligaen	29	1	1	0	30	1
2007	Strømsgodset	Tippeligaen	22	1	4	1	26	2
2008	Strømsgodset	Tippeligaen	26	2	5	1	31	3
2009	Strømsgodset	Tippeligaen	29	1	2	1	31	2
2010	Strømsgodset	Tippeligaen	29	3	6	1	35	4
2011	Strømsgodset	Tippeligaen	29	3	1	0	30	3
2012	Start	Adeccoligaen	24	7	2	0	26	7
2013	Start	Tippeligaen	23	0	3	0	26	0
2014	Start	Tippeligaen	27	2	3	1	30	3
2015	Jerv	OBOS-ligaen	27	1	2	0	29	1
2016	Jerv	OBOS-ligaen	27	3	1	0	28	3
2017	Jerv	OBOS-ligaen	29	5	4	0	33	5
2018	Jerv	OBOS-ligaen	12	2	2	0	14	2
Career Total			416	41	41	6	457	47
