= Jorge Castro (footballer) =

Costa Rican footballer (born 1990)

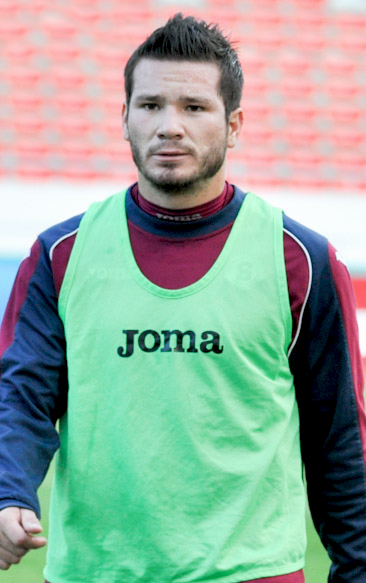
- Castro in 2012

Personal information
- Full name: Jorge Alejandro Castro Salazar
- Date of birth: September 11, 1990 (age 36)
- Place of birth: San José, Costa Rica
- Height: 1.79 m (5 ft 10 in)
- Position: Striker

Youth career
- Deportivo Saprissa

Senior career*
| Years | Team | Apps | (Gls) |
| 2010–2013 | Deportivo Saprissa | 36 | (10) |
| 2010–2011 | → UCR (loan) | 22 | (1) |
| 2011 | → Santos de Guápiles (loan) | 13 | (7) |
| 2013–2015 | Start | 36 | (8) |
| 2014friendly match | → Sarpsborg 08 (loan) | 14 | (2) |
| 2015 | → Brann (loan) | 14 | (2) |
| 2016–2017 | Cartaginés | 32 | (4) |
| 2017 | Herediano | 19 | (0) |
| 2017 | Guadalupe | 3 | (0) |
| 2017–2019 | Sporting San José | | |
| 2019–2020 | Municipal Grecia | 50 | (11) |
| 2020 | → Sporting San José (loan) | 14 | (1) |
| 2021 | Jicaral | 10 | (0) |
- * Club domestic league appearances and goals as of 20:43, 11 January 2022 (UTC)

Jorge Alejandro Castro Salazar (born 11 September 1990) is a Costa Rican football forward.

== Club career ==
He began his career at Deportivo Saprissa before signing a four-year contract with a start in December 2012.

== International career ==
Castro was included in the Costa Rica teams for the 2007 FIFA U-17 World Championship and 2009 FIFA World Youth Championship.

He was included in the Costa Rica national football team for the 2011 Copa América, but did not play at all in the tournament.

== Career statistics ==
| Season | Club | Division | League | | Cup | | Total | |
| Season | Club | Division | Apps | Goals | Apps | Goals | Apps | Goals |
|---|---|---|---|---|---|---|---|---|
| 2013 | Start | Tippeligaen | 29 | 6 | 4 | 1 | 33 | 7 |
| 2014 | Start | Tippeligaen | 7 | 2 | 3 | 2 | 10 | 4 |
| 2014 | Sarpsborg 08 | Tippeligaen | 14 | 2 | 2 | 0 | 16 | 2 |
| 2015 | Brann | OBOS-ligaen | 14 | 2 | 4 | 4 | 18 | 6 |
| Career Total | | | 64 | 12 | 13 | 7 | 77 | 19 |
