= Guðmundur Kristjánsson =

Icelandic footballer

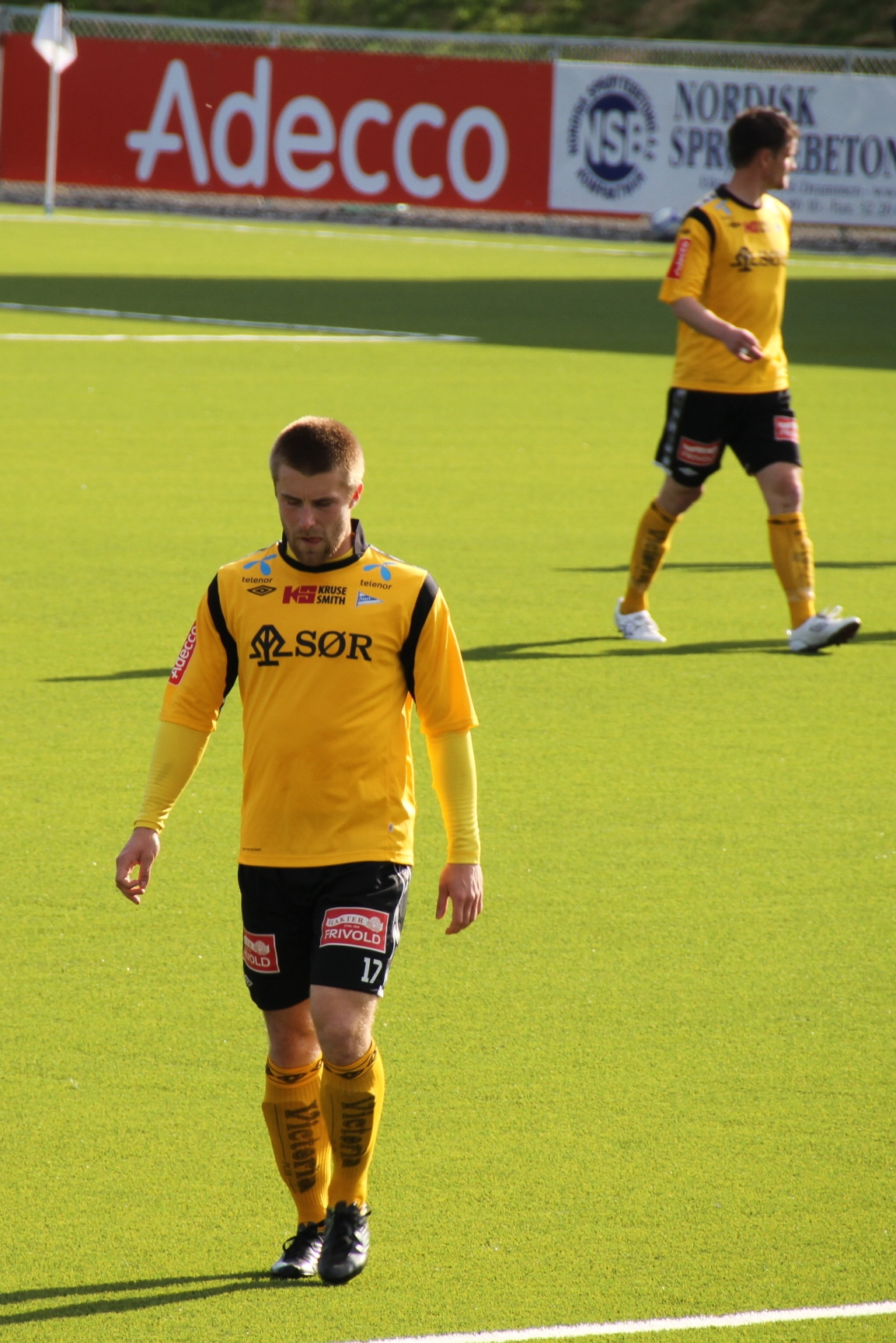
- Guðmundur Kristjánsson, May 2012

Personal information
- Date of birth: 1 March 1989 (age 37)
- Place of birth: Iceland
- Height: 1.80 m (5 ft 11 in)
- Positions: Midfielder; centre back

Team information
- Current team: Stjarnan
- Number: 5

Youth career
- Breiðablik

Senior career*
Years	Team	Apps	(Gls)
2007–2012	Breiðablik	80	(17)
2008	→ Haukar (loan)	6	(1)
2012	→ Start (loan)	27	(7)
2013–2017	Start	121	(6)
2018–2023	FH Hafnarfjörður	102	(1)
2023–	Stjarnan	87	(4)

International career^{‡}
2005	Iceland U17	7	(0)
2006–2008	Iceland U19	11	(1)
2008–2011	Iceland U21	11	(0)
2009–	Iceland	7	(0)
- * Club domestic league appearances and goals as of 16 November 2026 ‡ National team caps and goals as of 18 March 2026

Guðmundur Kristjánsson (born 1 March 1989) is an Icelandic football player, currently playing for Icelandic club Stjarnan and the Iceland national team.

== Career statistics ==
=== Club ===
Appearances and goals by club, season and competition
Club	Season	League			National cup		Total	
Club	Season	Division	Apps	Goals	Apps	Goals	Apps	Goals
Breiðablik	2009	Úrvalsdeild	19	5	0	0	19	5
Breiðablik	2010	Úrvalsdeild	21	5	1	0	22	5
Breiðablik	2011	Úrvalsdeild	21	6	3	0	24	6
Breiðablik	Total		61	16	4	0	65	16
Start (loan)	2012	Adeccoligaen	27	7	4	2	31	9
Start	2013	Tippeligaen	26	2	5	1	31	3
Start	2014	Tippeligaen	29	2	3	0	32	2
Start	2015	Tippeligaen	23	1	1	0	24	1
Start	2016	Tippeligaen	22	1	3	0	25	1
Start	2017	OBOS-ligaen	15	0	1	0	16	0
Start	Start total		142	13	17	3	159	16
Career total			203	29	21	3	224	32
