= Alexander Lind (footballer, born 1989) =

Norwegian footballer

Personal information
- Date of birth: 23 March 1989 (age 37)
- Height: 1.86 m (6 ft 1 in)
- Position: Forward

Team information
- Current team: Donn
- Number: 2

Youth career
- Gimletroll

Senior career*
Years	Team	Apps	(Gls)
- Gimletroll
–2013	Donn		
2014–	Start	12	(1)
2015–2018	Jerv	66	(18)
2019–	Donn	12	(2)
- * Club domestic league appearances and goals as of 15 December 2019

Alexander Lind (born 23 March 1989) is a Norwegian football striker who plays for FK Donn.

He spent time in Eliteserien with IK Start in 2014, playing almost half the games. He thereafter played four seasons in the 1. divisjon with FK Jerv.
