= Terje Reinertsen =

Norwegian footballer (born 1987)

Personal information
- Date of birth: 14 September 1987 (age 39)
- Height: 1.91 m (6 ft 3 in)
- Position: Goalkeeper

Youth career
- Farsund
- 2004–2006: Mandalskameratene

Senior career*
Years	Team	Apps	(Gls)
2006–2008	Mandalskameratene	13	(0)
2009	Notodden	3	(0)
2010–2012	Vindbjart		
2012–2014	Start	10	(0)

International career
2004	Norway U17	2	(0)
2005	Norway U18	1	(0)
2006	Norway U19	2	(0)
- * Club domestic league appearances and goals

Terje Reinertsen (born 14 September 1987) is a retired Norwegian football goalkeeper.

He hails from the Spind area of Farsund Municipality. Playing for Mandalskameratene, he represented Norway as a youth international. He joined Notodden FK in 2009, Vindbjart FK in 2010 and last played in IK Start from November 2012 to 2014. He got 9 Eliteserien games.
