= Solomon Owello =

Nigerian footballer

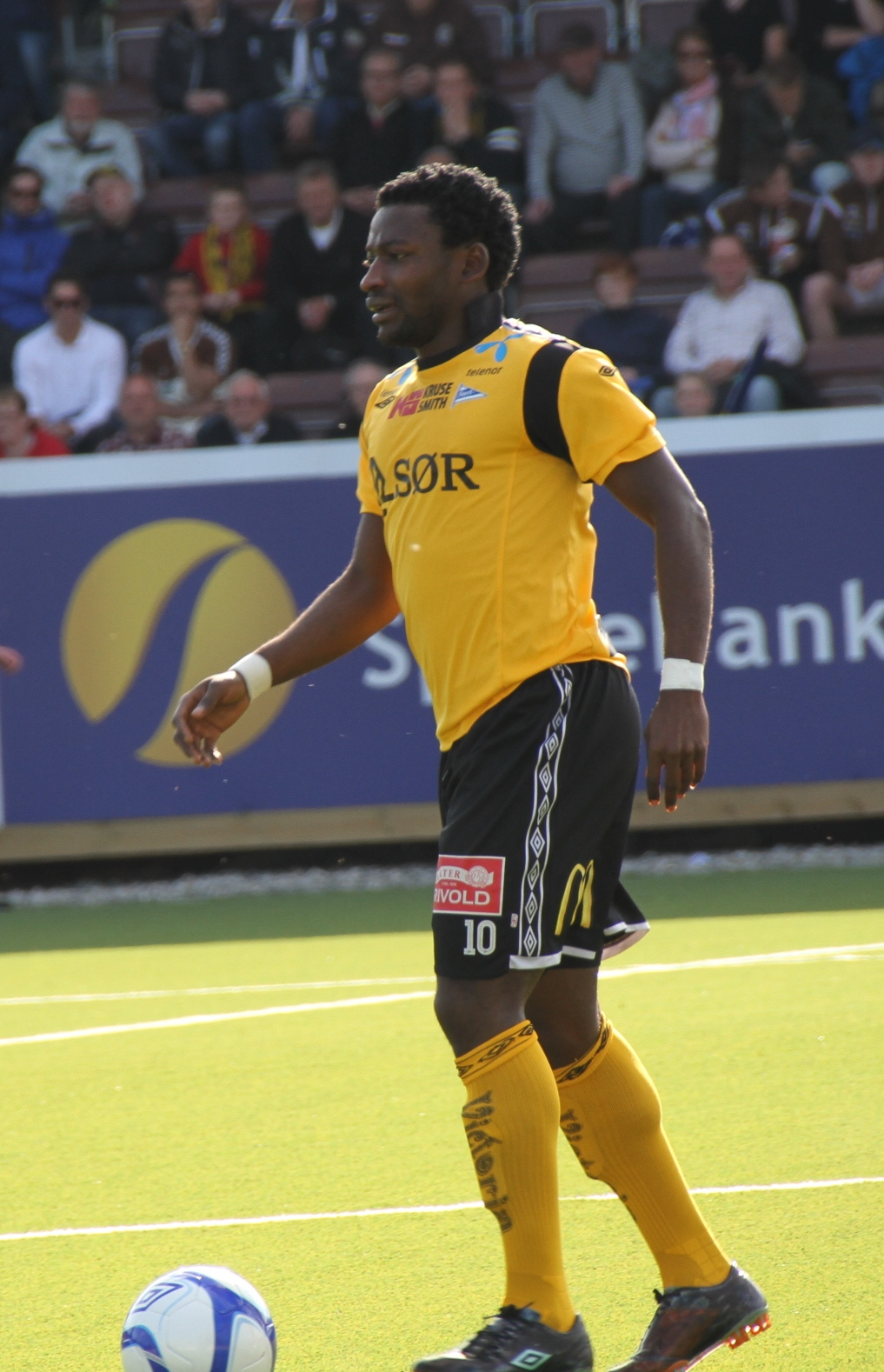
- Solomon Owello play against Mjøndalen IF, May 2012

Personal information
- Full name: Solomon James Owello
- Date of birth: 25 December 1988 (age 37)
- Place of birth: Nigeria
- Height: 1.70 m (5 ft 7 in)
- Position: Midfielder

Senior career*
Years	Team	Apps	(Gls)
2006–2008	Niger Tornadoes F.C.		
2008–2015	Start	193	(8)
2015	Sandnes Ulf	10	(0)
2016–2018	Niger Tornadoes F.C.		
2018–2020	Kwara United F.C.		
- * Club domestic league appearances and goals as of 19:38, 16 January 2023 (UTC)

Solomon James Owello (born 25 December 1988) is a Nigerian former footballer who played as a midfielder.

== Career ==
He came to Start in 2008 from Nigerian club Niger Tornadoes F.C.

In 2016 Owello came back to Nigeria and joined Niger Tornadoes. He then joined Kwara United F.C. on 25 November 2018.

=== Career statistics ===
As of match played 24 August 2015

Season	Club	Division	League		Cup		Total	
Season	Club	Division	Apps	Goals	Apps	Goals	Apps	Goals
2008	Start	1. divisjon	14	0	0	0	14	0
2009	Start	Tippeligaen	21	0	1	0	22	0
2010	Start	Tippeligaen	26	1	3	0	29	1
2011	Start	Tippeligaen	28	0	6	0	34	0
2012	Start	1. divisjon	30	6	2	0	32	6
2013	Start	Tippeligaen	27	0	2	0	29	0
2014	Start	Tippeligaen	28	1	4	0	32	1
2015	Start	Tippeligaen	19	0	2	0	21	0
2015	Sandnes Ulf	1. divisjon	10	0	0	0	10	0
Career Total			203	8	19	0	222	8
