= Birger Madsen =

Norwegian footballer (born 1982)

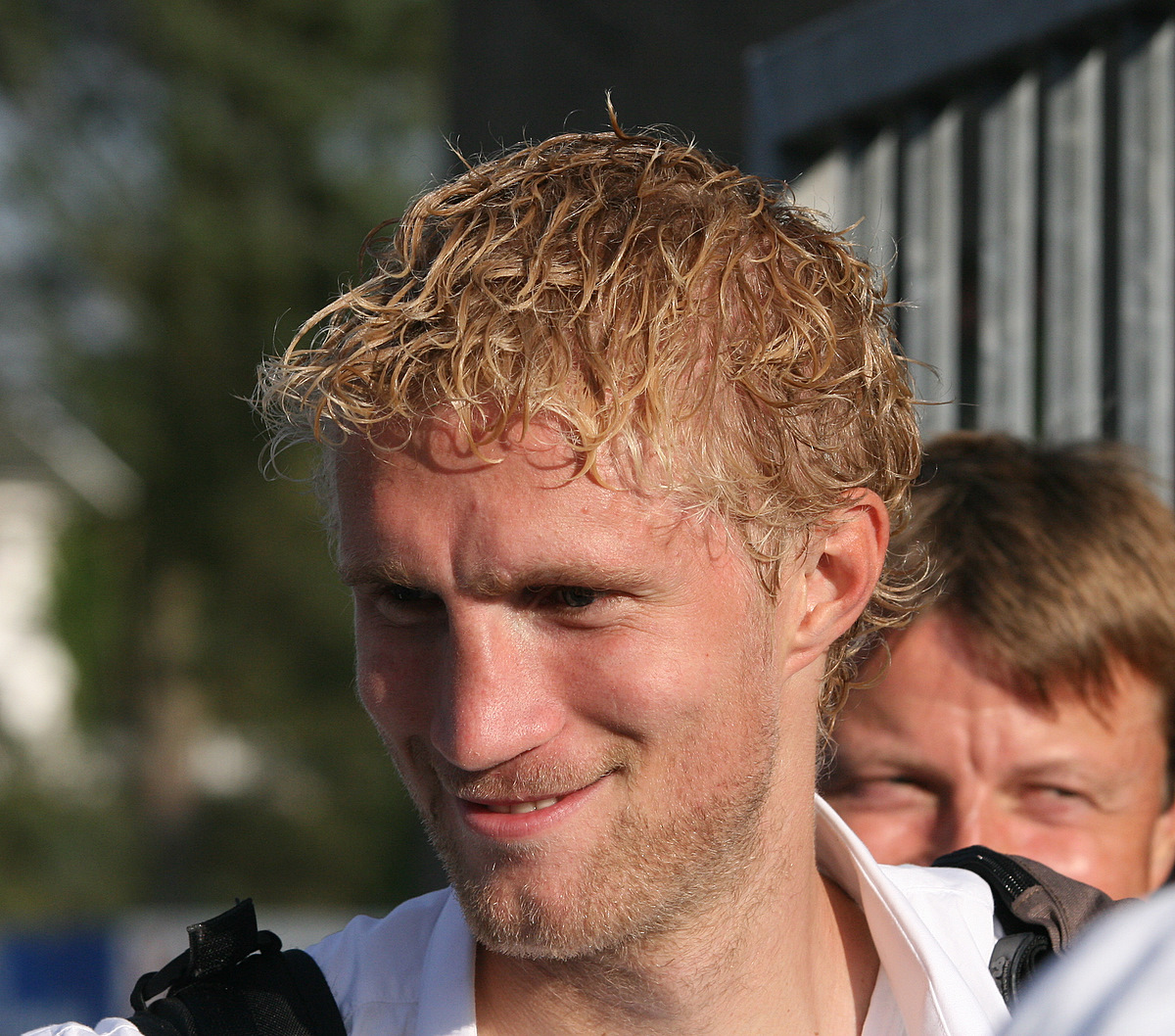

Personal information
- Date of birth: 23 April 1982 (age 44)
- Place of birth: Oslo, Norway
- Height: 1.95 m (6 ft 5 in)
- Position: Defender

Youth career
- 1988–1994: Manglerud Star
- 1995–1997: Skeid
- 1998: Nordstrand
- 1999–2000: Skeid

Senior career*
Years	Team	Apps	(Gls)
2000–2005	Skeid	84	(4)
2006–2009	Sandefjord	85	(6)
2009–2010	Vålerenga	11	(2)
2010–2013	Start	9	(0)
- * Club domestic league appearances and goals

Birger Madsen (born 23 April 1982) is a Norwegian professional footballer who played as a defender.

He played in Tippeligaen for Sandefjord, Vålerenga and Start, before retiring after the 2013 season due to illness.

== Career statistics ==
Season	Club	Division	League		Cup		Total	
Season	Club	Division	Apps	Goals	Apps	Goals	Apps	Goals
2000	Skeid	Adeccoligaen	1	0	0	0	1	0
2001	Skeid	Adeccoligaen	5	0	0	0	5	0
2002	Skeid	Adeccoligaen	19	1	2	0	21	1
2003	Skeid	Adeccoligaen	16	0	5	1	21	1
2004	Skeid	Adeccoligaen	29	3	0	0	29	3
2005	Skeid	Adeccoligaen	14	0	0	0	14	0
2006	Sandefjord	Tippeligaen	13	2	2	1	15	3
2007	Sandefjord	Tippeligaen	23	3	1	1	24	4
2008	Sandefjord	Adeccoligaen	29	0	0	0	29	0
2009	Sandefjord	Tippeligaen	20	1	1	0	21	1
2009	Vålerenga	Tippeligaen	5	1	1	0	6	1
2010	Vålerenga	Tippeligaen	6	1	0	0	6	1
2011	Start	Tippeligaen	3	0	0	0	3	0
2012	Start	Adeccoligaen	6	0	2	0	8	0
2013	Start	Tippeligaen	0	0	0	0	0	0
Career Total			189	12	14	3	203	15
