= Henrik Dahlum =

Norwegian footballer (born 1994)

Personal information
- Full name: Henrik Dahlum
- Date of birth: 9 March 1994 (age 32)
- Place of birth: Kristiansand, Norway
- Position: Midfielder

Team information
- Current team: Fløy
- Number: 9

Youth career
- Våg
- Start

Senior career*
Years	Team	Apps	(Gls)
2011–2013	Start	7	(0)
2014–2015	Jerv	22	(4)
2015–	Fløy	50	(10)
- * Club domestic league appearances and goals as of 18 January 2018

Henrik Dahlum (born 9 March 1994) is a Norwegian footballer playing for Fløy. He is the son of the former Norwegian international Tore André "Totto" Dahlum.

Dahlum made his debut for Start in Tippeligaen in 2011. Before the 2012 Norwegian season he signed a professional contract with the Norwegian club IK Start. He can play both midfield and forward.

== Career statistics ==
Club	Season	Division	League		Cup		Total	
Club	Season	Division	Apps	Goals	Apps	Goals	Apps	Goals
2011	Start	Tippeligaen	2	0	0	0	2	0
2012	Start	Adeccoligaen	5	0	0	0	5	0
2013	Start	Tippeligaen	0	0	1	0	1	0
2014	Jerv	2. divisjon	12	4	1	0	13	4
2015	Jerv	OBOS-ligaen	1	0	0	0	1	0
2015	Flekkerøy (Fløy)	2. divisjon	10	5	0	0	10	5
2016	Flekkerøy (Fløy)	2. divisjon	20	3	1	0	21	3
2017	Flekkerøy (Fløy)	3. divisjon	20	2	2	1	22	3
Career Total			75	14	5	1	75	15
