= Jesper Mathisen =

Norwegian footballer (born 1987)

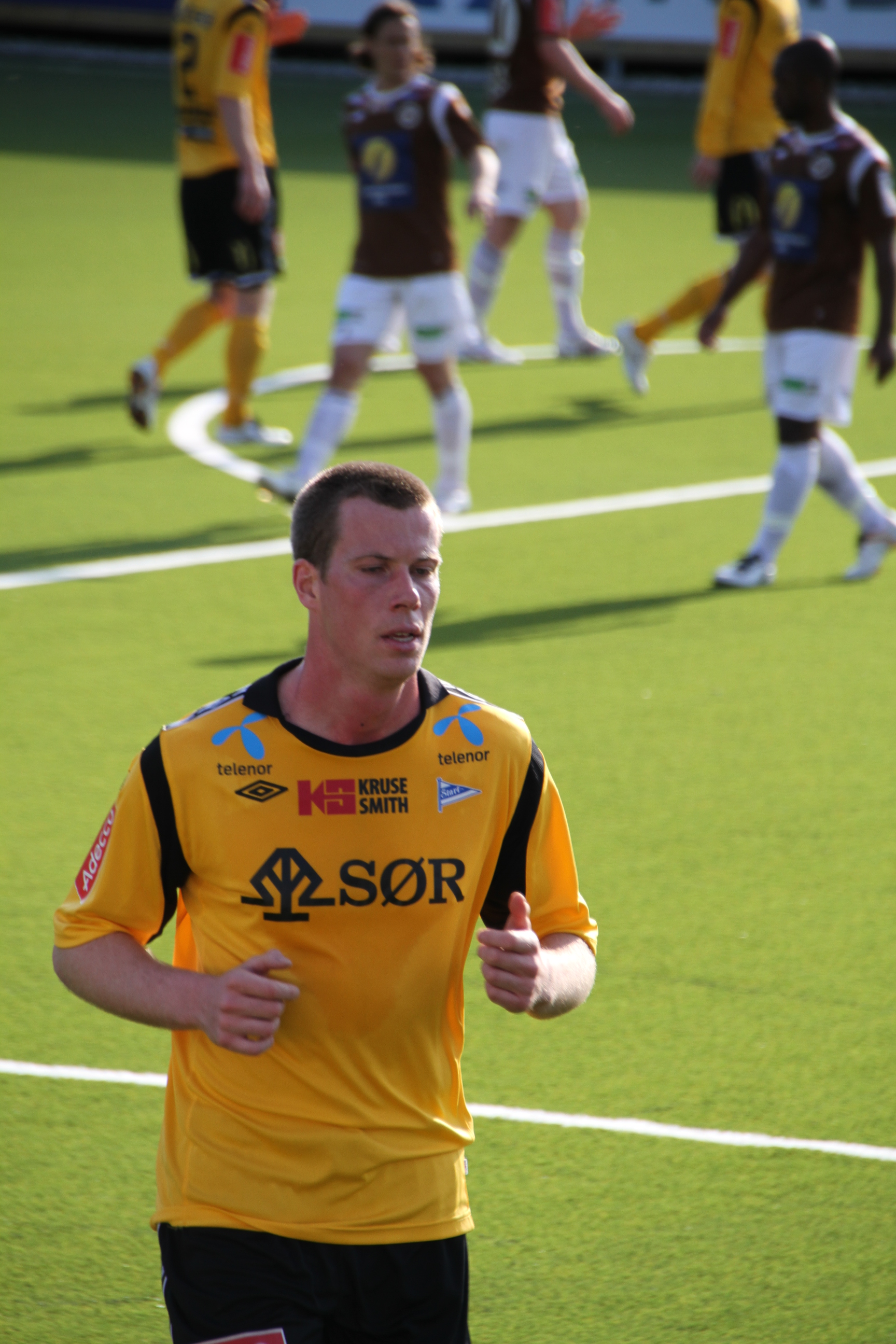
- Mathisen with IK Start in 2012

Personal information
- Full name: Jesper Aleksander Mathisen
- Date of birth: 17 March 1987 (age 39)
- Place of birth: Kristiansand, Norway
- Height: 1.96 m (6 ft 5 in)
- Position: Centre-back

Senior career*
Years	Team	Apps	(Gls)
2004–2015	IK Start	144	(10)
2005	→ Bryne (loan)	2	(0)
Total		146	(10)

International career
2003	Norway U16	8	(4)
2004	Norway U17	6	(4)
2004–2005	Norway U18	10	(6)
2005–2006	Norway U19	12	(2)
2005–2007	Norway U21	2	(0)
- * Club domestic league appearances and goals

Jesper Mathisen (born 17 March 1987) is a Norwegian former footballer who spent his entire career with IK Start with the exception of a loan to Bryne. Originally a striker, he converted to being a centre-back.

== Career ==
Mathisen was on IK Start's first team from 2004, but only in the 2008 season he got significant playing time. He did better for youth specific national teams, and in 2005 scored four goals against Malta on the U-18 team.

== Personal life ==
Jesper Mathisen is the son of footballer Svein "Matta" Mathisen, who is often referred to as a legendary Start player.

== Career statistics ==
Appearances and goals by club, season and competition
Club	Season	League			Cup		Total	
Club	Season	Division	Apps	Goals	Apps	Goals	Apps	Goals
Start	2004	1. divisjon	2	0	0	0	2	0
Start	2005	Tippeligaen	2	0	1	0	3	0
Start	2006	Tippeligaen	2	0	1	0	3	0
Start	2007	Tippeligaen	2	0	0	0	2	0
Start	2008	1. divisjon	24	1	1	1	25	2
Start	2009	Tippeligaen	17	0	2	0	19	0
Start	2010	Tippeligaen	19	2	5	1	24	3
Start	2011	Tippeligaen	24	1	5	2	29	3
Start	2012	1. divisjon	25	4	3	0	28	4
Start	2013	Tippeligaen	23	2	0	0	23	2
Start	2014	Tippeligaen	4	0	0	0	4	0
Start	2015	Tippeligaen	0	0	0	0	0	0
Start	Total		144	10	18	4	162	14
Bryne (loan)	2005	1. divisjon	2	0	0	0	10	0
Career total			146	10	18	4	164	14
