= Bismar Acosta =

Costa Rican footballer (born 1986)

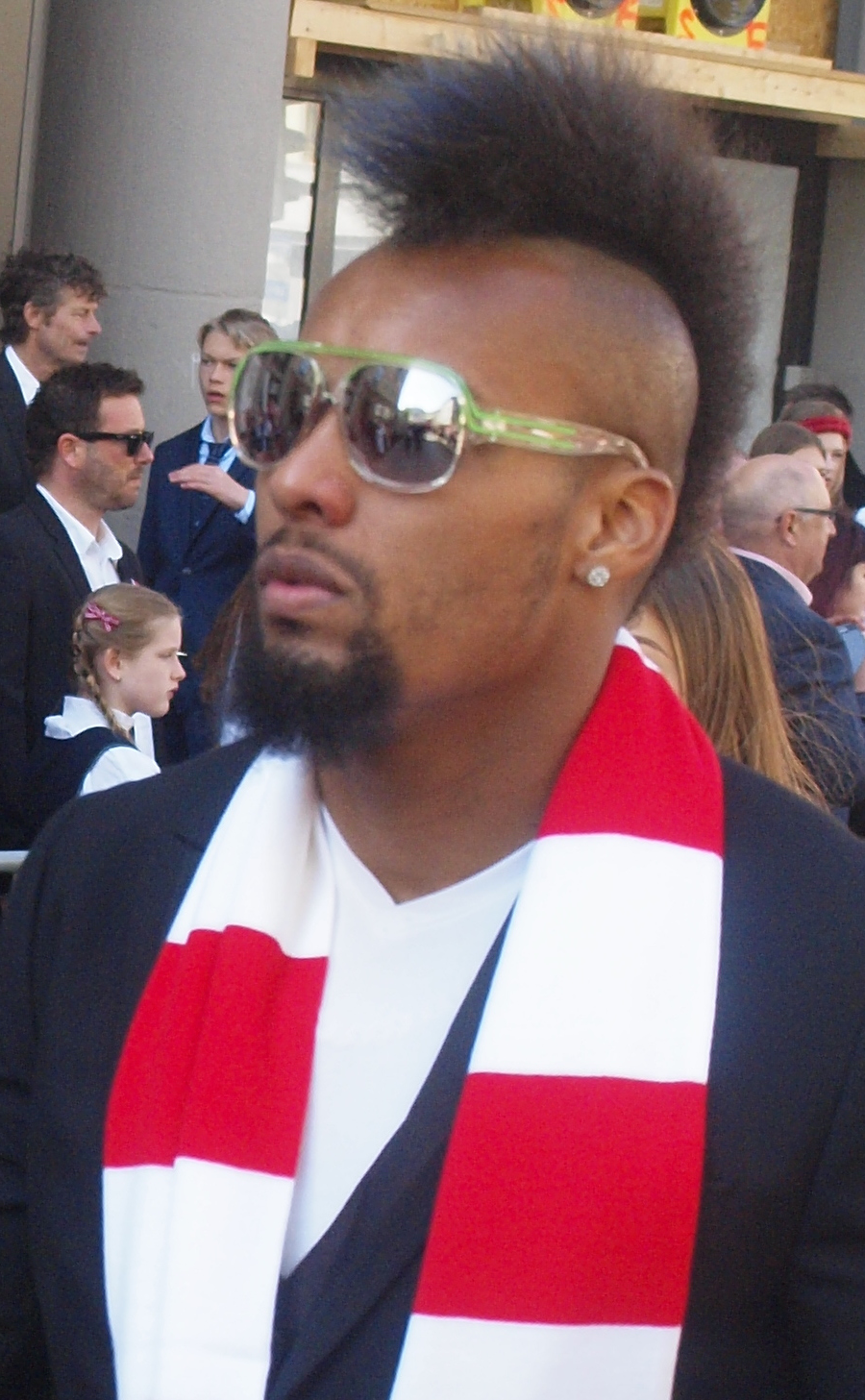
- Bismar Acosta

Personal information
- Full name: Bismar Gilberto Acosta Evans
- Date of birth: 19 December 1986 (age 39)
- Place of birth: Santa Cruz, Costa Rica
- Height: 1.82 m (6 ft 0 in)
- Position: Defender

Team information
- Current team: Pitbulls FC

Senior career*
Years	Team	Apps	(Gls)
2005–2007	Santacruceña	41	(1)
2007–2008	San Carlos	28	(0)
2008–2011	Herediano	73	(2)
2011–2013	Belén	61	(4)
2013–2015	Start	52	(5)
2015–	Brann	139	(7)

International career
2010–	Costa Rica	8	(0)
- * Club domestic league appearances and goals as of 17 September 2020

Bismar Gilberto Acosta Evans (born 19 December 1986) is a Costa Rican footballer who plays for Costa Rican club Pitbulls FC.

== Club career ==
Acosta spent eight years in the Costa Rican league, most notably with Herediano. He moved abroad to join Norwegian side Start in January 2013, and then SK Brann in March 2015.

== Career statistics ==
=== Club ===
As of match played 13 September 2020

Appearances and goals by club, season and competition
Club	Season	League			National Cup		Continental		Other		Total	
Club	Season	Division	Apps	Goals	Apps	Goals	Apps	Goals	Apps	Goals	Apps	Goals
Herediano	2009–10	Liga FPD	25	1	0	0	2	0	-		27	1
Herediano	2010–11	Liga FPD	23	1	0	0	-		-		23	1
Herediano	Total		48	2	0	0	2	0	-	-	50	2
Belén	2011–12	Liga FPD	40	3	0	0	-		-		40	3
Belén	2012–13	Liga FPD	21	1	0	0	-		-		21	1
Belén	Total		61	4	0	0	-	-	-	-	61	4
Start	2013	Tippeligaen	27	3	5	1	-		-		32	4
Start	2014	Tippeligaen	25	2	3	1	-		-		28	3
Start	Total		52	5	8	2	-	-	-	-	60	7
Brann	2015	OBOS-ligaen	28	1	4	0	-		-		32	1
Brann	2016	Tippeligaen	20	2	1	0	-		-		21	2
Brann	2017	Eliteserien	27	1	3	0	2	1	1	0	33	2
Brann	2018	Eliteserien	27	2	2	0	-		-		29	2
Brann	2019	Eliteserien	28	1	3	0	2	0	-		33	1
Brann	2020	Eliteserien	9	0	0	0	-		-		9	0
Brann	Total		139	7	13	0	4	1	1	0	157	8
Career total			300	18	21	2	6	1	1	0	328	21

== International career ==
Acosta made his debut for Costa Rica in an October 2010 friendly match against Peru and has, as of January 2014, earned a total of 8 caps, scoring no goals. He has represented his country in 2 FIFA World Cup qualification matches.
