= 2018 IK Start season =

IK Start
2018 season
- Chairman: Magne Kristiansen
- Manager: Mark Dempsey (until 18 May); Mick Priest (interim) (from 19 May)(until 29 May); Kjetil Rekdal
- Stadium: Sør Arena
- Eliteserien: 15th (relegated)
- Norwegian Cup: Semi-final vs Rosenborg
- Top goalscorer: League: Kristján Flóki Finnbogason (2); All: Aron Sigurðarson (4)
Home colours	Away colours

The 2018 season is IK Start's first season back in the Eliteserien following their relegation at the end of the 2016 season.

== Season events ==
Prior to the start of the season, IK Start appointed Mark Dempsey as their new manager. After a run of poor results, Dempsey was fired on 18 May 2018, Mick Priest taking over as Interim Manager.Kjetil Rekdal took over on a permanent basis on May 30.

== Squad ==
As of 31 August 2018. Note: Flags indicate national team as defined under FIFA eligibility rules; some limited exceptions apply. Players may hold more than one non-FIFA nationality.

No.	Pos.	Nation	Player
1	GK	NOR	Håkon Opdal
2	DF	SWE	Elliot Käck
3	DF	NOR	Espen Hammer Berger
4	MF	NGA	Aremu Afeez
5	MF	NOR	Adnan Hadzic
6	DF	NOR	Simon Larsen (captain)
7	FW	SWE	Kevin Kabran
8	FW	GHA	Ibrahim Mensah
10	MF	NOR	Tobias Christensen
11	FW	ISL	Aron Sigurðarson
14	MF	NOR	Espen Børufsen
15	DF	NOR	Henrik Robstad
16	MF	NOR	Andreas Hollingen

No.	Pos.	Nation	Player
17	MF	ISL	Guðmundur Andri Tryggvason
18	MF	GHA	Isaac Twum
19	MF	NOR	Kasper Skaanes
20	FW	NOR	Mathias Bringaker
21	MF	NOR	Niklas Sandberg
23	MF	NOR	Erlend Segberg
24	MF	KOS	Herolind Shala
26	GK	GER	Jonas Deumeland
27	DF	NOR	Eirik Wichne
31	DF	JAM	Damion Lowe
33	FW	SWE	Isac Lidberg
77	FW	NGA	Adeleke Akinyemi

=== Out on loan ===
Note: Flags indicate national team as defined under FIFA eligibility rules; some limited exceptions apply. Players may hold more than one non-FIFA nationality.

No. / Pos. / Nation / Player; 22 / FW / ISL / Kristján Flóki Finnbogason (at Brommapojkarna)	No. / Pos. / Nation / Player; 45 / GK / NOR / Benjamin Boujar (at Hødd)

== Transfers ==
=== Winter ===
In: Note: Flags indicate national team as defined under FIFA eligibility rules; some limited exceptions apply. Players may hold more than one non-FIFA nationality.

No.	Pos.	Nation	Player
2	DF	SWE	Elliot Käck (from (Sweden) Djurgården)
3	DF	NOR	Espen Hammer Berger (from (Norway) Levanger)
4	MF	NGA	Aremu Afeez (from (Ghana) Inter Allies)
7	FW	SWE	Kevin Kabran (from (Sweden) Brommapojkarna)
11	MF	ISL	Aron Sigurðarson (from (Norway) Tromsø)
17	FW	ISL	Guðmundur Andri Tryggvason (from (Iceland) KR Reykjavik)
18	MF	GHA	Isaac Twum (from (Ghana) Inter Allies)
19	MF	NOR	Kasper Skaanes (from (Norway) Brann)
20	FW	NOR	Mathias Bringaker (from (Norway) Viking)
21	MF	NOR	Niklas Sandberg (from (Norway) Ull/Kisa)
25	MF	NGA	Michael Ogungbaro (from (Norway) Jerv)
26	GK	GER	Jonas Deumeland
33	FW	SWE	Isac Lidberg (from (Sweden) Åtvidaberg)

Out: Note: Flags indicate national team as defined under FIFA eligibility rules; some limited exceptions apply. Players may hold more than one non-FIFA nationality.

No.	Pos.	Nation	Player
2	DF	NOR	Jens Kristian Skogmo (to (Norway) Arendal)
3	DF	FIN	Tapio Heikkilä (to (Norway) Sandnes Ulf)
4	MF	USA	Conor O'Brien
7	MF	NED	Niels Vorthoren (to (Norway) Sandnes Ulf)
11	FW	NOR	Steffen Lie Skålevik (loan return to (Norway) Brann)
17	MF	ISL	Guðmundur Kristjánsson (to (Iceland) FH)
19	FW	NGA	Abubakar Ibrahim (on loan to (Norway) HamKam)
21	MF	NOR	Mikael Ugland (on loan to (Norway) Fløy)
25	MF	NGA	Michael Ogungbaro (on loan to (Norway) Åsane)
26	GK	NOR	Mats Olsen (to (Norway) Fløy)
28	DF	NOR	Rolf Daniel Vikstøl (to (Norway) Viking)
30	FW	NOR	Lasse Sigurdsen (on loan to (Norway) Fløy)}
32	MF	NOR	Thomas Zernichow (to (Norway) Jerv)
33	FW	GHA	Dennis Antwi (on loan to (Norway) Åsane)}
33	FW	SWE	Isac Lidberg (on loan to (Norway) Jerv)
—	DF	NOR	Philip Sandvik Aukland (on loan to (Norway) Arendal)}

=== Summer ===
In: Note: Flags indicate national team as defined under FIFA eligibility rules; some limited exceptions apply. Players may hold more than one non-FIFA nationality.

No.	Pos.	Nation	Player
8	FW	GHA	Ibrahim Mensah (from (Slovenia) Aluminij)
24	MF	KOS	Herolind Shala (from (Denmark) Lyngby)
33	FW	SWE	Isac Lidberg (loan return from (Norway) Jerv)
77	FW	NGA	Adeleke Akinyemi (from (Latvia) Ventspils)

Out: Note: Flags indicate national team as defined under FIFA eligibility rules; some limited exceptions apply. Players may hold more than one non-FIFA nationality.

No.	Pos.	Nation	Player
8	FW	NOR	Lars-Jørgen Salvesen (to (Norway) Ull/Kisa)
9	MF	NOR	Daniel Aase (to (Norway) Jerv)
19	FW	NGA	Abubakar Ibrahim (to (Norway) HamKam, previously on loan)
22	FW	ISL	Kristján Flóki Finnbogason (on loan to (Sweden) Brommapojkarna)
30	FW	NOR	Lasse Sigurdsen (to (Norway) Fløy, previously on loan)}
33	FW	SWE	Isac Lidberg (on loan to (Norway) HamKam)
45	GK	NOR	Benjamin Boujar (on loan to (Norway) Hødd)
—	FW	NOR	Markus Håbestad (to (Norway) Arendal)
—	DF	NOR	Peter Reinhardsen (to (Norway) Jerv)
—	MF	NOR	Håkon Suggelia (to (Norway) Jerv)

== Competitions ==
=== Eliteserien ===
==== Results summary ====
Overall								Home						Away					
Pld	W	D	L	GF	GA	GD	Pts	W	D	L	GF	GA	GD	W	D	L	GF	GA	GD
30	8	5	17	29	54	−25	29	6	2	7	17	20	−3	2	3	10	12	34	−22

Last updated: 24 November 2018.
Source: see below

==== Results by round ====
Round	1	2	3	4	5	6	7	8	9	10	11	12	13	14	15	16	17	18	19	20	21	22	23	24	25	26	27	28	29	30
Ground	H	H	A	H	A	A	H	A	H	A	H	A	H	H	A	H	A	H	A	H	A	H	A	A	H	A	H	A	H	A
Result	W	L	L	L	L	D	L	L	L	L	W	L	D	W	L	W	L	D	D	L	D	W	W	L	W	W	L	L	L	L
Position	2	8	13	16	16	16	16	16	16	16	15	15	15	15	15	15	15	15	15	15	15	14	14	15	14	11	13	13	14	15

Updated to match(es) played on 24 November 2018. Source: see below
A = Away; H = Home; W = Win; D = Draw; L = Loss

==== Results ====
11 March 2018 1	Start	4–1	Tromsø	Kristiansand
18:00 CET (UTC+1)	Finnbogason 6'; Kabran 7'; Twum (yellow card) 22'; Robstad (yellow card) 34'; Käck 61'; Christensen (yellow card) 75'; Afeez 90+1'	Report	Wangberg (yellow card) 13'; Landu Landu (yellow card) 43'; Pedersen 90'	Stadium: Sør Arena; Attendance: 3,608; Referee: Trygve Kjensli

2 April 2018 3	Start	1–4	Sandefjord	Kristiansand
18:00 CET (UTC+1)	Finnbogason 21'; Lowe (yellow card) 29'; Wichne (yellow card) 43'; Afeez (yellow card) 54'	Report	Storbæk 34'; Kane (yellow card) 56'; Vallès (yellow card) 61' (goal) 78'; Engblom 68', 84'	Stadium: Sør Arena; Attendance: 4,716; Referee: Kristoffer Hagenes

9 April 2018 4	Lillestrøm	1–0	Start	Lillestrøm
19:00 CEST (UTC+2)	Olsen 32'; Antonijevic (yellow card) 61'	Report	Lowe (yellow card) 73'	Stadium: Åråsen Stadion; Attendance: 3,925; Referee: Dag Vidar Hafsås

14 April 2018 5	Start	1–6	Vålerenga	Kristiansand
18:00 CEST (UTC+2)	Larsen (red card) 5'; Christensen 39'; Finnbogason (yellow card) 56'	Report	Holm 6'; Johnson 25'; Finne 50'; Ejuke 53' (yellow card) 77'; Friðjónsson 66'; Tollås 70'	Stadium: Sør Arena; Attendance: 5,007; Referee: Kai Erik Steen

22 April 2018 6	Rosenborg	2–0	Start	Trondheim
18:00 CEST (UTC+2)	Reginiussen 47'; Konradsen 90'	Report	Lowe (yellow card) 40'; Twum (yellow card) 86'; Käck (yellow card) 90'	Stadium: Lerkendal Stadion; Attendance: 15,594; Referee: Trond Ivar Døvle

25 April 2018 2	Stabæk	1–1	Start	Bærum
18:30 CEST (UTC+2)	Omoijuanfo 70'; Moe (yellow card) 87'	Report	Christensen (yellow card) 67'; Sigurðarson 82'; Twum (yellow card) 86'; Kabran (yellow card) 89'; Lowe (yellow card) 90+5'	Stadium: Nadderud Stadion; Attendance: 3,043; Referee: Tommy Skjerven

29 April 2018 7	Start	0–1	Haugesund	Kristiansand
18:00: CEST (UTC+2)	Afeez (yellow card) 39'	Report	Gytkjær 49' (yellow card) 58'; Stølås (yellow card) 89'	Stadium: Sør Arena; Attendance: 4,159; Referee: Trygve Kjensli

6 May 2018 8	Odd	3–0	Start	Skien
18:00 CEST (UTC+2)	Nordkvelle 19'; Rashani 44'; Lauritsen 76'	Report	Salvesen (red card) 40'	Stadium: Skagerak Arena; Attendance: 6,530; Referee: Sigurd Smehus Kringstad

12 May 2018 9	Start	0–1	Brann	Kristiansand
18:00 CEST (UTC+2)	Robstad (yellow card) 79'	Report	Skålevik 75'	Stadium: Sør Arena; Attendance: 4,859; Referee: Svein Oddvar Moen

16 May 2018 10	Sarpsborg 08	4–0	Start	Sarpsborg
18:00 CEST (UTC+2)	Mortensen 3'; Askar 31', 80'; Nielsen 55'	Report	Larsen (yellow card) 30'; Sigurðarson (yellow card) 55'; Finnbogason (yellow card) 66'; Afeez (yellow card) 90'	Stadium: Sarpsborg Stadion; Attendance: 5,630; Referee: Kai Erik Steen

21 May 2018 11	Start	1–0	Bodø/Glimt	Kristiansand
18:00 CEST (UTC+2)	Børufsen 7'; Lowe (yellow card) 76'; Finnbogason (yellow card) 87'; Christensen (yellow card) 90+4'; Deumeland (yellow card) 90+4'	Report	Isidoro (yellow card) 45+1'; Hauge (yellow card) 67'; Jurado (yellow card) 79'; Zinckernagel (yellow card) 90+4'; Opseth (yellow card) 90+5'	Stadium: Sør Arena; Attendance: 3,500; Referee: Rohit Saggi

27 May 2018 12	Molde	3–1	Start	Molde
18:00 CEST (UTC+2)	Hussain 23' (yellow card) 45'; Chukwu 53' (yellow card) 90'; Aursnes 88'; Sarr (yellow card) 90+2'	Report	Christensen (yellow card) 27'; Afeez 33'; Finnbogason (yellow card) 45'	Stadium: Aker Stadion; Attendance: 6,335; Referee: Trygve Kjensli

10 June 2018 13	Start	1–1	Strømsgodset	Kristiansand
18:00 CEST (UTC+2)	Børufsen 18'; Sigurðarson (yellow card) 81'	Report	Pedersen 52'; Nguen (yellow card) 54' (yellow-red card) 86'	Stadium: Sør Arena; Attendance: 4,602; Referee: Espen Eskås

24 June 2018 14	Start	2–0	Kristiansund	Kristiansand
18:00 CEST (UTC+2)	Kabran 61'; Lowe (yellow card) 85'; Bringaker 88'	Report	Baranov (yellow card) 74'	Stadium: Sør Arena; Attendance: 4,010; Referee: Svein Oddvar Moen

1 July 2018 15	Ranheim	2–0	Start	Trondheim
18:00 CEST (UTC+2)	Dønnem 34'; Løkberg (yellow card) 55'; Karlsen 58' (penalty missed) 81'; Reginiussen (yellow card) 84'	Report	Wichne (yellow card) 33'; Finnbogason (yellow card) 80'; Berger (yellow card) 85'	Stadium: EXTRA Arena; Attendance: 1,600; Referee: Kai Erik Steen

8 July 2018 16	Start	2–1	Stabæk	Kristiansand
18:00 CEST (UTC+2)	Kabran 60'; Afeez 61'; Käck (yellow card) 77'	Report	Brochmann 49'; Demidov (yellow card) 77'	Stadium: Sør Arena; Attendance: 4,282; Referee: Tom Harald Hagen

6 August 2018 17	Brann	4–1	Start	Bergen
19:00 CEST (UTC+2)	Haugen 3'; Ordagić 31'; Koomson 85'; Marengo 90'	Report	Kabran 59'; Segberg (yellow card) 63'; Robstad (yellow card) 83'	Stadium: Brann Stadion; Attendance: 9,865; Referee: Trygve Kjensli

12 August 2018 18	Start	0–0	Ranheim	Kristiansand
18:00 CEST (UTC+2)	Käck (yellow card) 58'; Sandberg (yellow card) 80'	Report	Witry (yellow card) 58'	Stadium: Sør Arena; Attendance: 3,714; Referee: Espen Eskås

19 August 2018 19	Strømsgodset	1–1	Start	Drammen
18:00 CEST (UTC+2)	Tokstad (yellow card) 12'; Glesnes 80'	Report	Afeez (yellow card) 31'; Kabran 32'; Deumeland (yellow card) 45'	Stadium: Marienlyst Stadion; Attendance: 5,992; Referee: Kristoffer Hagenes

27 August 2018 20	Start	0–1	Odd	Kristiansand
19:00 CEST (UTC+2)	Hadzic (yellow card) 77'	Report	Rashani 3'; Rossbach (yellow card) 58'	Stadium: Sør Arena; Attendance: 3,494; Referee: Dag Vidar Hafsås

2 September 2018 21	Kristiansund	1–1	Start	Kristiansund
18:00 CEST (UTC+2)	Bye 88'	Report	Berger (yellow card) 23'; Shala 32'; Käck (yellow card) 70'	Stadium: Kristiansund Stadion; Attendance: 3,861; Referee: Tommy Skjerven

16 September 2018 22	Start	3–0	Lillestrøm	Kristiansand
18:00 CEST (UTC+2)	Akinyemi 5'; Lowe (yellow card) 14'; Kabran 20' (pen.); Bringaker 78'; Christensen (yellow card) 90'	Report	Amundsen (red card) 19'; Smárason (yellow card) 45+3'; Ødemarksbakken (yellow card) 86'; Pedersen (yellow card) 87'	Stadium: Sør Arena; Attendance: 10,419; Referee: Ola Hobber Nilsen

23 September 2018 23	Bodø/Glimt	1–2	Start	Bodø
18:00 CEST (UTC+2)	Layouni (yellow card) 35'; Bjørkan (yellow card) 57'; Saltnes (yellow card) 62'; Zinckernagel 70'	Report	Käck 75'; Bringaker 85'	Stadium: Aspmyra Stadion; Attendance: 2,700; Referee: Rohit Saggi

30 September 2018 24	Vålerenga	3–2	Start	Oslo
18:00 CEST (UTC+2)	Johnson 25', 57'; Abu (yellow card) 38'; Israelsson (yellow card) 65'; Dønnum (yellow card) 88'; Finne 89'	Report	Robstad (yellow card) 77'; Bringaker 88'; Shala 90+1'	Stadium: Intility Arena; Attendance: 8,200; Referee: Dag Vidar Hafsås

7 October 2018 25	Start	1–0	Sarpsborg 08	Kristiansand
18:00 CEST (UTC+2)	Afeez (yellow card) 72'; Bringaker 88'	Report	Agger (yellow card) 4'; Zachariassen (yellow card) 53'; Vasyutin (yellow card) 88'	Stadium: Sør Arena; Attendance: 3,837; Referee: Trygve Kjensli

21 October 2018 26	Tromsø	1–2	Start	Tromsø
18:00 CEST (UTC+2)	Wangberg (yellow card) 55'; Pedersen (yellow card) 79'; Bakenga 86'	Report	Lowe (yellow card) 10'; Shala 41' (yellow card) 59'; Wangberg 65' (o.g.); Afeez (yellow card) 75'; Segberg (yellow card) 77'	Stadium: Alfheim Stadion; Attendance: 3,116; Referee: Tom Harald Hagen

29 October 2018 27	Start	1–3	Molde	Kristiansand
19:00 CET (UTC+1)	Akinyemi 42'; Larsen (yellow card) 75'	Report	Eikrem (yellow card) 27' (goal) 61'; Cibicki 54'; Hestad 90+2'	Stadium: Sør Arena; Attendance: 6,425; Referee: Trond Ivar Døvle

4 November 2018 28	Sandefjord	4–1	Start	Sandefjord
18:00 CET (UTC+1)	Ringstad 7' (yellow card) 29'; Rufo 23'; Grorud 45+1'; Pálsson (yellow card) 49'; Morer (yellow card) 61' (goal) 90+3'	Report	Lowe 20'; Larsen (yellow card) 31'; Segberg (yellow card) 45'; Sandberg (yellow card) 87'	Stadium: Komplett Arena; Attendance: 2,505; Referee: Kristoffer Hagenes

11 November 2018 29	Start	0–1	Rosenborg	Kristiansand
18:00 CET (UTC+1)	Segberg (yellow card) 62'	Report	Adegbenro 28'; Trondsen (yellow card) 78'	Stadium: Sør Arena; Attendance: 5,481; Referee: Trygve Kjensli

24 November 2018 30	Haugesund	3–1	Start	Haugesund
18:00 CET (UTC+1)	David 59'; Sandvik (yellow card) 62'; Wadji 68', 77'	Report	Akinyemi 12' (yellow card) 45+2'; Hadzic (yellow card) 33'	Stadium: Haugesund Stadion; Attendance: 3,841; Referee: Kai Erik Steen

==== Table ====
Pos	Team	Pld	W	D	L	GF	GA	GD	Pts	Qualification or relegation
12	Lillestrøm	30	7	11	12	34	44	−10	32	
13	Strømsgodset	30	7	10	13	46	48	−2	31	
14	Stabæk (O)	30	6	11	13	37	50	−13	29	Qualification for the relegation play-offs
15	Start (R)	30	8	5	17	30	54	−24	29	Relegation to First Division
16	Sandefjord (R)	30	4	11	15	35	57	−22	23	Relegation to First Division

Source: Football Association of Norway (in Norwegian), Soccerway
Rules for classification: 1) Points; 2) Goal difference; 3) Goals scored; 4) Head-to-head points; 5) Head-to-head goal difference; 6) Head-to-head away goals scored (only if between two teams); 7) Head-to-head goals scored; 8) Play-off (only used to decide champions or relegation).
(O) Play-off winners; (R) Relegated

=== Norwegian Cup ===
18 April 2018 First Round	Vigør	1–8	Start	Kristiansand
18:00 CEST (UTC+2)	A.Abrahamsen (yellow card) 55' (yellow-red card) 72'; A.Valjevcic 88'	Report	Bringaker 2'; Berger 29'; Salvesen 32', 73' (pen.); Sigurðarson 33', 40', 63'; Afeez 64'	Stadium: Hellemyr kunstgress Attendance: 812; Referee: Marius Lien

2 May 2018 Second Round	Arendal	0–3	Start	Arendal
18:00 CEST (UTC+2)	Skogmo (yellow card) 79'; Hella (yellow card) 86'	Report	Lowe (yellow card) 52' (goal) 55'; Käck 58'; Kabran 79'	Stadium: Bjønnes Stadion; Attendance: 1,276; Referee: Daniel Higraff

9 May 2018 Third Round	Egersund	0–1	Start	Egersund
19:15 CEST (UTC+2)	C.Sleveland (yellow card) 70'	Report	Bringaker 76'; Twum (yellow card) 84'	Stadium: Idrettsparken; Attendance: 876; Referee: Jan Morten Tennøy

13 June 2018 Fourth Round	Start	1–1 (a.e.t.) (5–3 p)	HamKam	Kristiansand
18:30 CEST (UTC+2)	Børufsen 34'; Afeez (yellow card) 120'	Report	Ibrahim 49'; Moen (yellow card) 100'; Dønnum (yellow card) 120'	Stadium: Sør Arena; Attendance: 1,704; Referee: Kristoffer Hagenes
	Penalties
	Sigurðarson (penalty scored); Sandberg (penalty scored); Finnbogason (penalty scored); Christensen (penalty scored); Kabran (penalty scored)		(penalty missed) Brotangen; (penalty scored) Hagen; (penalty scored) Nordli; (penalty scored) Moen

26 September 2018 Quarterfinal	Start	2–1	Bodø/Glimt	Kristiansand
18:00 CEST (UTC+2)	Christensen 7'; Lowe (yellow card) 51'; Shala (yellow card) 64'; Shala 76'	Report	Opseth 19'; Ángel (yellow card) 70'; Tagbajumi (yellow card) 90+5'	Stadium: Sør Arena; Attendance: 5,026; Referee: Espen Eskås

1 November 2018 Semifinal	Rosenborg	2–1	Start	Trondheim
19:05 CET (UTC+1)	Bendtner 55' (yellow card) 73'; Søderlund 90+3'	Report	Sandberg 33'	Stadium: Lerkendal Stadion; Attendance: 7,908; Referee: Ola Hobber Nilsen

== Squad statistics ==
As of match played 24 November 2018

=== Appearances and goals ===
No.	Pos	Nat	Player	Total		Eliteserien		Norwegian Cup	
No.	Pos	Nat	Player	Apps	Goals	Apps	Goals	Apps	Goals
1	GK	(Norway) NOR	Håkon Opdal	6	0	3+1	0	2	0
2	DF	(Sweden) SWE	Elliot Käck	32	3	28	2	4	1
3	DF	(Norway) NOR	Espen Hammer Berger	24	1	16+3	0	4+1	1
4	MF	(Nigeria) NGA	Aremu Afeez	30	4	23+3	3	4	1
5	MF	(Norway) NOR	Adnan Hadzic	19	0	9+7	0	2+1	0
6	DF	(Norway) NOR	Simon Larsen	30	0	25	0	5	0
7	FW	(Sweden) SWE	Kevin Kabran	24	7	19+3	6	2	1
8	FW	(Ghana) GHA	Ibrahim Mensah	3	0	0+2	0	1	0
10	MF	(Norway) NOR	Tobias Christensen	30	2	15+10	1	3+2	1
11	FW	(Iceland) ISL	Aron Sigurðarson	21	4	12+5	1	3+1	3
14	MF	(Norway) NOR	Espen Børufsen	10	3	8+1	2	1	1
15	DF	(Norway) NOR	Henrik Robstad	25	0	14+7	0	3+1	0
17	MF	(Iceland) ISL	Guðmundur Tryggvason	1	0	0	0	1	0
18	MF	(Ghana) GHA	Isaac Twum	15	0	10+3	0	2	0
19	MF	(Norway) NOR	Kasper Skaanes	21	0	14+2	0	4+1	0
20	FW	(Norway) NOR	Mathias Bringaker	25	7	1+20	5	3+1	2
21	MF	(Norway) NOR	Niklas Sandberg	21	1	7+8	0	2+4	1
23	MF	(Norway) NOR	Erlend Segberg	18	0	16	0	1+1	0
24	MF	(Kosovo) KOS	Herolind Shala	16	4	13+1	3	1+1	1
26	GK	(Germany) GER	Jonas Deumeland	29	0	26	0	3	0
27	DF	(Norway) NOR	Eirik Wichne	28	0	23	0	5	0
31	DF	(Jamaica) JAM	Damion Lowe	27	2	23	1	4	1
43	DF	(Norway) NOR	Altin Ujkani	1	0	0	0	0+1	0
77	FW	(Nigeria) NGA	Adeleke Akinyemi	14	3	12	3	1+1	0
Players away from Start on loan:
22	FW	(Iceland) ISL	Kristján Flóki Finnbogason	16	2	11+2	2	2+1	0
45	GK	(Norway) NOR	Benjamin Boujar	3	0	1+1	0	1	0
Players who appeared for Start no longer at the club:
8	FW	(Norway) NOR	Lars-Jørgen Salvesen	7	2	1+3	0	2+1	2

=== Goal scorers ===
Place	Position	Nation	Number	Name	Eliteserien	Norwegian Cup	Total
1	FW	(Sweden)	7	Kevin Kabran	6	1	7
1	FW	(Norway)	20	Mathias Bringaker	5	2	7
3	MF	(Nigeria)	4	Aremu Afeez	3	1	4
3	MF	(Kosovo)	24	Herolind Shala	3	1	4
3	FW	(Iceland)	11	Aron Sigurðarson	1	3	4
6	FW	(Nigeria)	77	Adeleke Akinyemi	3	0	3
6	MF	(Norway)	14	Espen Børufsen	2	1	3
6	DF	(Sweden)	2	Elliot Käck	2	1	3
9	FW	(Iceland)	22	Kristján Flóki Finnbogason	2	0	2
9	FW	(Norway)	10	Tobias Christensen	1	1	2
9	DF	(Jamaica)	31	Damion Lowe	1	1	2
9	FW	(Norway)	8	Lars-Jørgen Salvesen	0	2	2
13	DF	(Norway)	3	Espen Hammer Berger	0	1	1
13	DF	(Norway)	21	Niklas Sandberg	0	1	1
13				Own goal	1	0	1
				TOTALS	17	16	33

=== Disciplinary record ===
Number	Nation	Position	Name	Eliteserien		Norwegian Cup		Total	
Number	Nation	Position	Name	Booked	Sent off (straight red)	Booked	Sent off (straight red)	Booked	Sent off (straight red)
2	(Sweden)	DF	Elliot Käck	4	0	0	0	4	0
3	(Norway)	DF	Espen Hammer Berger	2	0	0	0	2	0
4	(Nigeria)	MF	Aremu Afeez	6	0	1	0	7	0
5	(Norway)	MF	Adnan Hadzic	2	0	0	0	2	0
6	(Norway)	DF	Simon Larsen	3	1	0	0	3	1
7	(Sweden)	FW	Kevin Kabran	1	0	0	0	1	0
10	(Norway)	MF	Tobias Christensen	5	0	0	0	5	0
11	(Iceland)	FW	Aron Sigurðarson	2	0	0	0	2	0
15	(Norway)	DF	Henrik Robstad	4	0	0	0	4	0
18	(Ghana)	MF	Isaac Twum	3	0	1	0	4	0
21	(Norway)	MF	Niklas Sandberg	2	0	0	0	2	0
23	(Norway)	MF	Erlend Segberg	4	0	0	0	4	0
24	(Kosovo)	MF	Herolind Shala	1	0	1	0	2	0
26	(Germany)	GK	Jonas Deumeland	2	0	0	0	2	0
27	(Norway)	DF	Eirik Wichne	2	0	0	0	2	0
31	(Jamaica)	DF	Damion Lowe	8	0	2	0	10	0
77	(Nigeria)	FW	Adeleke Akinyemi	1	0	0	0	1	0
Players away from Start on loan:
22	(Iceland)	FW	Kristján Flóki Finnbogason	5	0	0	0	5	0
Players who left Start during the season:
8	(Norway)	FW	Lars-Jørgen Salvesen	0	1	0	0	0	1
			TOTALS	57	2	3	0	60	2
