= List of Norwegian football transfers summer 2018 =

This is a list of Norwegian football transfers in the 2018 summer transfer window by club. Only clubs of the 2018 Eliteserien and 2018 OBOS-ligaen are included.

== Eliteserien ==
=== Bodø/Glimt ===
In: Note: Flags indicate national team as defined under FIFA eligibility rules; some limited exceptions apply. Players may hold more than one non-FIFA nationality.

No.	Pos.	Nation	Player
11	FW	NGA	Marco Tagbajumi (from (Republic of Ireland) Dundalk)
12	GK	POL	Artur Krysiak (from (England) Yeovil Town)
16	MF	NOR	Morten Konradsen (from (Norway) Rosenborg)

Out: Note: Flags indicate national team as defined under FIFA eligibility rules; some limited exceptions apply. Players may hold more than one non-FIFA nationality.

No.	Pos.	Nation	Player
11	FW	NOR	Jens Petter Hauge (on loan to (Norway) Aalesund)
12	GK	SRB	Zoran Popović (to (Serbia) Red Star Belgrade)
30	FW	NOR	Trond Olsen (to (Norway) Sogndal)

=== Brann ===
In: Note: Flags indicate national team as defined under FIFA eligibility rules; some limited exceptions apply. Players may hold more than one non-FIFA nationality.

No.	Pos.	Nation	Player
4	DF	NOR	Christian Eggen Rismark (from (Norway) Ranheim)
5	DF	NOR	Thomas Grøgaard (from (Norway) Odd)
9	FW	CIV	Daouda Bamba (from (Norway) Kristiansund)
16	MF	NOR	Ruben Yttergård Jenssen (from (Netherlands) Groningen)
20	MF	NOR	Halldor Stenevik (loan return from (Norway) Nest-Sotra)

Out: Note: Flags indicate national team as defined under FIFA eligibility rules; some limited exceptions apply. Players may hold more than one non-FIFA nationality.

No.	Pos.	Nation	Player
5	DF	NOR	Jonas Grønner (to (Norway) Aalesund)
23	MF	NOR	Sivert Heltne Nilsen (to (Denmark) Horsens)
37	DF	NOR	Jonas Tillung Fredriksen (to (Norway) Sogndal)

=== Haugesund ===
In: Note: Flags indicate national team as defined under FIFA eligibility rules; some limited exceptions apply. Players may hold more than one non-FIFA nationality.

No.	Pos.	Nation	Player
15	MF	NGA	Izuchuckwu Anthony (loan return from (Norway) Jerv)
17	FW	SEN	Ibrahima Wadji (on loan from (Norway) Molde)
21	MF	NOR	Tobias Svendsen (on loan from (Norway) Molde)

Out: Note: Flags indicate national team as defined under FIFA eligibility rules; some limited exceptions apply. Players may hold more than one non-FIFA nationality.

No.	Pos.	Nation	Player
31	MF	NOR	Kristoffer Gunnarshaug (to (Norway) Lysekloster)
55	MF	SRB	Aleksandar Kovačević (to (Greece) Xanthi)

=== Kristiansund ===
In: Note: Flags indicate national team as defined under FIFA eligibility rules; some limited exceptions apply. Players may hold more than one non-FIFA nationality.

No.	Pos.	Nation	Player
4	DF	FRA	Christophe Psyché (from (Czech Republic) Baník Ostrava)
11	FW	KOS	Flamur Kastrati (from (Norway) Sandefjord)
20	FW	SWE	Simon Alexandersson (from (Sweden) Brage)

Out: Note: Flags indicate national team as defined under FIFA eligibility rules; some limited exceptions apply. Players may hold more than one non-FIFA nationality.

No.	Pos.	Nation	Player
2	DF	NOR	Joakim Bjerkås (on loan to (Norway) Levanger)
11	FW	CIV	Daouda Bamba (to (Norway) Brann)
20	FW	NOR	Benjamin Stokke (to (Denmark) Randers)
27	DF	EST	Nikita Baranov (to (Norway) Sogndal)

=== Lillestrøm ===
In: Note: Flags indicate national team as defined under FIFA eligibility rules; some limited exceptions apply. Players may hold more than one non-FIFA nationality.

No.	Pos.	Nation	Player
12	MF	NGA	Raphael Ayagwa (from (Nigeria) Plateau United)
23	MF	DEN	Daniel A. Pedersen (from (Denmark) AGF Aarhus)
88	MF	ISL	Arnór Smárason (from (Sweden) Hammarby)

Out: Note: Flags indicate national team as defined under FIFA eligibility rules; some limited exceptions apply. Players may hold more than one non-FIFA nationality.

No.	Pos.	Nation	Player
7	MF	NGA	Ebiye Moses (on loan to (Norway) Strømmen)
8	MF	NGA	Charles Ezeh (on loan to (Norway) Strømmen)
16	FW	NOR	Tobias Gran (on loan to (Norway) HamKam)

=== Molde ===
In: Note: Flags indicate national team as defined under FIFA eligibility rules; some limited exceptions apply. Players may hold more than one non-FIFA nationality.

No.	Pos.	Nation	Player
2	DF	SWE	Isak Ssewankambo (loan return from (Sweden) Malmö FF)
7	MF	NOR	Magnus Wolff Eikrem (from (United States) Seattle Sounders FC)
12	GK	BEL	Alex Craninx (from (Spain) Cartagena)
15	DF	FRO	Sonni Nattestad (loan return from (Norway) Aalesund)
24	FW	SWE	Paweł Cibicki (on loan from (England) Leeds United)

Out: Note: Flags indicate national team as defined under FIFA eligibility rules; some limited exceptions apply. Players may hold more than one non-FIFA nationality.

No.	Pos.	Nation	Player
7	MF	NOR	Mathias Normann (loan return to (England) Brighton & Hove Albion)
13	FW	SEN	Ibrahima Wadji (on loan to (Norway) Haugesund)
15	DF	FRO	Sonni Nattestad (on loan to (Denmark) AC Horsens)
18	DF	NOR	Leo Skiri Østigård (to (England) Brighton & Hove Albion, previously on loan at (Norway) Viking)
21	MF	NOR	Tobias Svendsen (on loan to (Norway) Haugesund)
24	FW	NOR	Eman Markovic (to (Bosnia and Herzegovina) Zrinjski Mostar)
33	FW	NOR	Fredrik Brustad (on loan to (Scotland) Hamilton Academical)

=== Odd ===
In: Note: Flags indicate national team as defined under FIFA eligibility rules; some limited exceptions apply. Players may hold more than one non-FIFA nationality.

No.	Pos.	Nation	Player
15	DF	NOR	Andreas Nordvik (from (Denmark) Fredericia)
24	MF	NOR	André Sødlund (from (Norway) Sandefjord)

Out: Note: Flags indicate national team as defined under FIFA eligibility rules; some limited exceptions apply. Players may hold more than one non-FIFA nationality.

No.	Pos.	Nation	Player
5	DF	NOR	Thomas Grøgaard (to (Norway) Brann)
24	DF	NOR	John Kitolano (to (England) Wolverhampton Wanderers)

=== Ranheim ===
In: Note: Flags indicate national team as defined under FIFA eligibility rules; some limited exceptions apply. Players may hold more than one non-FIFA nationality.

No.	Pos.	Nation	Player
8	MF	NOR	Magnus Stamnestrø (from (Norway) Rosenborg)

Out: Note: Flags indicate national team as defined under FIFA eligibility rules; some limited exceptions apply. Players may hold more than one non-FIFA nationality.

No.	Pos.	Nation	Player
2	DF	NOR	Christian Eggen Rismark (to (Norway) Brann)
8	MF	NOR	Simen Raaen Sandmæl (to (Norway) Levanger)
19	DF	NOR	Glenn Walker (on loan to (Norway) Stjørdals-Blink)

=== Rosenborg ===
In: Note: Flags indicate national team as defined under FIFA eligibility rules; some limited exceptions apply. Players may hold more than one non-FIFA nationality.

No.	Pos.	Nation	Player
5	MF	SRB	Đorđe Denić (from (Serbia) Rad)
20	DF	AUS	Alex Gersbach (loan return from (France) Lens)
27	FW	TUN	Issam Jebali (from (Sweden) Elfsborg)
30	DF	NGA	Igho Ogbu (loan return from (Norway) Levanger)

Out: Note: Flags indicate national team as defined under FIFA eligibility rules; some limited exceptions apply. Players may hold more than one non-FIFA nationality.

No.	Pos.	Nation	Player
5	DF	DEN	Jacob Rasmussen (to (Italy) Empoli)
18	MF	NOR	Magnus Stamnestrø (to (Norway) Ranheim)
20	DF	DEN	Malte Amundsen (on loan to (Germany) Eintracht Braunschweig)
22	MF	NOR	Morten Konradsen (to (Norway) Bodø/Glimt)
27	FW	NOR	Rafik Zekhnini (loan return to (Italy) Fiorentina)

=== Sandefjord ===
In: Note: Flags indicate national team as defined under FIFA eligibility rules; some limited exceptions apply. Players may hold more than one non-FIFA nationality.

No.	Pos.	Nation	Player
1	GK	NOR	Jacob Storevik (from (Norway) Florø)
11	FW	NOR	Fitim Azemi (on loan from (Norway) Vålerenga)
13	DF	NOR	Marius Høibråten (from (Norway) Strømsgodset)
14	FW	ESP	Rufo (from (Spain) Mallorca)
17	DF	AND	Marc Vales (from (Finland) SJK Seinäjoki)
18	MF	SWE	William Kurtovic (loan return from (Norway) Ull/Kisa)
21	DF	NOR	Stian Ringstad (on loan from (Norway) Strømsgodset)
22	MF	NOR	Mohammed Fellah (from (Denmark) Nordsjælland)

Out: Note: Flags indicate national team as defined under FIFA eligibility rules; some limited exceptions apply. Players may hold more than one non-FIFA nationality.

No.	Pos.	Nation	Player
1	GK	ISL	Ingvar Jónsson (to (Denmark) Viborg)
11	FW	KOS	Flamur Kastrati (to (Norway) Kristiansund)
13	DF	ENG	Andrew Eleftheriou (loan return to (England) Watford)
17	DF	NOR	Joackim Solberg Olsen (to (Norway) Mjøndalen)
20	DF	SEN	Abdoulaye Seck (to (Belgium) Royal Antwerp)
22	MF	NOR	André Sødlund (to (Norway) Odd)
25	MF	NOR	Sabawon Shamohammad (on loan to (Norway) Fram Larvik)
34	MF	NOR	Herman Solberg Nilsen (on loan to (Norway) Fram Larvik)

=== Sarpsborg 08 ===
In: Note: Flags indicate national team as defined under FIFA eligibility rules; some limited exceptions apply. Players may hold more than one non-FIFA nationality.

No.	Pos.	Nation	Player
2	DF	NOR	Sulayman Bojang (from (Norway) Skeid)
3	DF	NOR	Jørgen Horn (from (Sweden) Elfsborg)
5	DF	ISL	Orri Sigurður Ómarsson (loan return from (Norway) HamKam)
45	FW	NOR	Jørgen Strand Larsen (loan return from (Italy) Milan Primavera)
78	GK	RUS	Aleksandr Vasyutin (from (Finland) FC Lahti)

Out: Note: Flags indicate national team as defined under FIFA eligibility rules; some limited exceptions apply. Players may hold more than one non-FIFA nationality.

No.	Pos.	Nation	Player
20	DF	NOR	Anders Østli (to (Norway) Moss)
21	GK	NOR	Anders Kristiansen (to (Belgium) Union SG)
28	FW	NOR	Alexander Ruud Tveter (on loan to (Norway) Strømmen)
30	DF	CRO	Nikola Tkalčić (on loan to (Norway) Aalesund)

=== Stabæk ===
In: Note: Flags indicate national team as defined under FIFA eligibility rules; some limited exceptions apply. Players may hold more than one non-FIFA nationality.

No.	Pos.	Nation	Player
12	GK	SWE	Marcus Sandberg (from (Norway) Vålerenga)
14	MF	NOR	Kristoffer Askildsen (promoted from junior squad)
19	MF	CIV	Aboubakar Keita (on loan from (Denmark) F.C. Copenhagen)
45	DF	NOR	Morten Renå Olsen (loan return from (Norway) HamKam)
77	MF	SVN	Filip Valenčič (from (Finland) HJK)

Out: Note: Flags indicate national team as defined under FIFA eligibility rules; some limited exceptions apply. Players may hold more than one non-FIFA nationality.

No.	Pos.	Nation	Player
30	GK	CIV	Sayouba Mandé (to (Denmark) OB)
89	MF	DEN	Tonny Brochmann (to (Norway) Mjøndalen)
94	MF	NOR	Martin Rønning Ovenstad (loan return to (Austria) Sturm Graz)

=== Start ===
In: Note: Flags indicate national team as defined under FIFA eligibility rules; some limited exceptions apply. Players may hold more than one non-FIFA nationality.

No.	Pos.	Nation	Player
8	FW	GHA	Ibrahim Mensah (from (Slovenia) Aluminij)
24	MF	KOS	Herolind Shala (from (Denmark) Lyngby)
77	FW	NGA	Adeleke Akinyemi (from (Latvia) Ventspils)

Out: Note: Flags indicate national team as defined under FIFA eligibility rules; some limited exceptions apply. Players may hold more than one non-FIFA nationality.

No.	Pos.	Nation	Player
8	FW	NOR	Lars-Jørgen Salvesen (to (Norway) Ull/Kisa)
9	MF	NOR	Daniel Aase (to (Norway) Jerv)
19	FW	NGA	Abubakar Ibrahim (to (Norway) HamKam, previously on loan)
22	FW	ISL	Kristján Flóki Finnbogason (on loan to (Sweden) Brommapojkarna)
30	FW	NOR	Lasse Sigurdsen (to (Norway) Fløy, previously on loan)
33	FW	SWE	Isac Lidberg (on loan to (Norway) HamKam, previously on loan to (Norway) Jerv)
45	GK	NOR	Benjamin Boujar (on loan to (Norway) Hødd)
—	FW	NOR	Markus Håbestad (to (Norway) Arendal)
—	DF	NOR	Peter Reinhardsen (to (Norway) Jerv)
—	MF	NOR	Håkon Suggelia (to (Norway) Jerv)

=== Strømsgodset ===
In: Note: Flags indicate national team as defined under FIFA eligibility rules; some limited exceptions apply. Players may hold more than one non-FIFA nationality.

No.	Pos.	Nation	Player
8	MF	NOR	Johan Hove (from (Norway) Sogndal)
9	FW	NOR	Sebastian Pedersen (loan return from (Norway) Strømmen)
40	GK	NOR	Morten Sætra (loan return from (Norway) Elverum)
66	MF	NOR	Andreas Hoven (loan return from (Norway) Notodden)
—	MF	NOR	Martin Rønning Ovenstad (from (Austria) Sturm Graz)

Out: Note: Flags indicate national team as defined under FIFA eligibility rules; some limited exceptions apply. Players may hold more than one non-FIFA nationality.

No.	Pos.	Nation	Player
8	MF	LBN	Bassel Jradi (to (Croatia) Hajduk Split)
13	MF	SWE	Christian Rubio Sivodedov (to (Sweden) GIF Sundsvall, previously on loan)
21	MF	NOR	Mathias Gjerstrøm (on loan to (Norway) Notodden)
25	DF	NOR	Stian Ringstad (on loan to (Norway) Sandefjord)
28	DF	NOR	Marius Høibråten (to (Norway) Sandefjord)
54	MF	NOR	Knut Ahlander (to (United States) SMU Mustangs, previously on loan at (Norway) Asker)
63	FW	NOR	Magnus Lankhof-Dahlby (on loan to (Norway) Grorud)

=== Tromsø ===
In: Note: Flags indicate national team as defined under FIFA eligibility rules; some limited exceptions apply. Players may hold more than one non-FIFA nationality.

No.	Pos.	Nation	Player
10	FW	NOR	Mikael Ingebrigtsen (from (Sweden) IFK Göteborg)
11	MF	FIN	Robert Taylor (from (Sweden) AIK, previously on loan)
18	MF	FIN	Onni Valakari (from (Finland) TPS)

Out: Note: Flags indicate national team as defined under FIFA eligibility rules; some limited exceptions apply. Players may hold more than one non-FIFA nationality.

No.	Pos.	Nation	Player
8	MF	DEN	Oliver Kjærgaard (on loan to (Norway) Nest-Sotra)
9	FW	SVN	Slobodan Vuk (on loan to (Slovenia) Domžale)
12	GK	CRO	Filip Lončarić (retired)
18	FW	SEN	Elhadji Mour Samb (released)
—	MF	NOR	Henrik Johnsgård (on loan to (Norway) Tromsdalen)
—	MF	NOR	August Mikkelsen (on loan to (Norway) Tromsdalen)

=== Vålerenga ===
In: Note: Flags indicate national team as defined under FIFA eligibility rules; some limited exceptions apply. Players may hold more than one non-FIFA nationality.

No.	Pos.	Nation	Player
14	MF	GHA	Mohammed Abu (on loan from (United States) Columbus Crew)
16	MF	SWE	Erik Israelsson (on loan from (Netherlands) PEC Zwolle)
26	MF	NOR	Aron Dønnum (loan return from (Norway) HamKam)

Out: Note: Flags indicate national team as defined under FIFA eligibility rules; some limited exceptions apply. Players may hold more than one non-FIFA nationality.

No.	Pos.	Nation	Player
1	GK	SWE	Marcus Sandberg (to (Norway) Stabæk)
9	FW	NOR	Fitim Azemi (on loan to (Norway) Sandefjord)
14	MF	GHA	Ernest Agyiri (loan return to (England) Manchester City)
17	MF	NOR	Simen Juklerød (to (Belgium) Royal Antwerp)
18	DF	NOR	Christian Borchgrevink (on loan to (Norway) HamKam)
30	DF	POR	João Meira (released)

== 1. divisjon ==
=== Aalesund ===
In: Note: Flags indicate national team as defined under FIFA eligibility rules; some limited exceptions apply. Players may hold more than one non-FIFA nationality.

No.	Pos.	Nation	Player
4	DF	NOR	Jonas Grønner (from (Norway) Brann)
15	DF	NOR	Ståle Steen Sæthre (from (Norway) Nest-Sotra)
21	FW	NOR	Jens Petter Hauge (on loan from (Norway) Bodø/Glimt)
30	DF	CRO	Nikola Tkalčić (on loan from (Norway) Sarpsborg 08)

Out: Note: Flags indicate national team as defined under FIFA eligibility rules; some limited exceptions apply. Players may hold more than one non-FIFA nationality.

No.	Pos.	Nation	Player
2	DF	DEN	Mikkel Kirkeskov (to (Poland) Piast Gliwice, previously on loan)
4	DF	FRO	Sonni Nattestad (loan return to (Norway) Molde)
21	MF	NOR	Bjørn Helge Riise (to (Norway) Sogndal)
33	FW	NOR	Anders Waagan (released)

=== Florø ===
In: Note: Flags indicate national team as defined under FIFA eligibility rules; some limited exceptions apply. Players may hold more than one non-FIFA nationality.

No.	Pos.	Nation	Player
12	DF	GEO	Otar Javashvili (from (Belarus) Gomel)
20	FW	NOR	Vegard Savland (from (Norway) Førde)
30	GK	NED	Renze Fij (from (Netherlands) Heracles Almelo)
97	MF	NZL	Moses Dyer (from (New Zealand) Manukau United)

Out: Note: Flags indicate national team as defined under FIFA eligibility rules; some limited exceptions apply. Players may hold more than one non-FIFA nationality.

No.	Pos.	Nation	Player
1	GK	NOR	Jacob Storevik (to (Norway) Sandefjord)
3	DF	NOR	Dejan Corovic (to (Norway) Arendal)
29	FW	NOR	Torbjørn Aabrekk (to (Norway) Byåsen)
92	GK	DEN	Nicklas Frenderup (to (Norway) Sandnes Ulf)

=== HamKam ===
In: Note: Flags indicate national team as defined under FIFA eligibility rules; some limited exceptions apply. Players may hold more than one non-FIFA nationality.

No.	Pos.	Nation	Player
2	DF	NOR	Christian Borchgrevink (on loan from (Norway) Vålerenga)
15	FW	SWE	Isac Lidberg (on loan from (Norway) Start)
18	FW	NED	Xander Houtkoop (from (Netherlands) Cambuur)
20	FW	NOR	Tobias Gran (on loan from (Norway) Lillestrøm)
99	FW	NGA	Abubakar Ibrahim (from (Norway) Start, previously on loan)

Out: Note: Flags indicate national team as defined under FIFA eligibility rules; some limited exceptions apply. Players may hold more than one non-FIFA nationality.

No.	Pos.	Nation	Player
2	DF	NOR	Morten Renå Olsen (loan return to (Norway) Stabæk)
3	DF	ISL	Orri Sigurður Ómarsson (loan return to (Norway) Sarpsborg 08)
15	MF	NOR	Aron Dønnum (loan return to (Norway) Vålerenga)
20	FW	NOR	Johnny Per Buduson (released)

=== Jerv ===
In: Note: Flags indicate national team as defined under FIFA eligibility rules; some limited exceptions apply. Players may hold more than one non-FIFA nationality.

No.	Pos.	Nation	Player
1	GK	FIN	Marc Nordqvist (on loan from (Finland) IFK Mariehamn)
11	MF	NOR	Daniel Aase (from (Norway) Start)
29	FW	USA	Sean Okoli (from (Sweden) Landskrona BoIS)
34	MF	NOR	Håkon Suggelia (from (Norway) Start)
35	DF	NOR	Peter Reinhardsen (from (Norway) Start)

Out: Note: Flags indicate national team as defined under FIFA eligibility rules; some limited exceptions apply. Players may hold more than one non-FIFA nationality.

No.	Pos.	Nation	Player
1	GK	NOR	Øyvind Knutsen (to (Norway) Hønefoss)
5	MF	NGA	Izuchuckwu Anthony (loan return to (Norway) Haugesund)
11	MF	NOR	Jan Jenssen (retired)
18	MF	NOR	Tobias Collett (to (Norway) KFUM Oslo)
22	DF	NOR	Sander Haugen (released)
33	FW	SWE	Isac Lidberg (loan return to (Norway) Start)

=== Kongsvinger ===
In: Note: Flags indicate national team as defined under FIFA eligibility rules; some limited exceptions apply. Players may hold more than one non-FIFA nationality.

No.	Pos.	Nation	Player
8	MF	KOR	Dongwan Gang
17	MF	BRA	Lucas Morais (from (Brazil) Tigres do Brasil)
77	GK	KEN	Arnold Origi (from (Norway) Sandnes Ulf)

Out: Note: Flags indicate national team as defined under FIFA eligibility rules; some limited exceptions apply. Players may hold more than one non-FIFA nationality.

No.	Pos.	Nation	Player
1	GK	NOR	Idar Lysgård (on loan to (Norway) Skeid)
12	MF	NOR	Martin Tangen Vinjor (on loan to (Norway) Asker)
17	MF	NOR	Jørgen Kolstad (to (Norway) Søndre Høland)
22	FW	NOR	Ludvig Langrekken (on loan to (Norway) Asker)
25	GK	CAN	Simon Thomas (to (Norway) Strømmen)

=== Levanger ===
In: Note: Flags indicate national team as defined under FIFA eligibility rules; some limited exceptions apply. Players may hold more than one non-FIFA nationality.

No.	Pos.	Nation	Player
11	MF	DEN	Kasper Nissen (on loan from (Norway) Sogndal)
16	MF	NOR	Simen Raaen Sandmæl (from (Norway) Ranheim)
19	DF	NOR	Joakim Bjerkås (on loan from (Norway) Kristiansund)
20	MF	NOR	Adrian Olsen Teigen (from (Norway) Mo)

Out: Note: Flags indicate national team as defined under FIFA eligibility rules; some limited exceptions apply. Players may hold more than one non-FIFA nationality.

No.	Pos.	Nation	Player
8	MF	NOR	Vegard Voll (to (Norway) Stjørdals-Blink)
19	DF	NGA	Igho Ogbu (loan return to (Norway) Rosenborg)

=== Mjøndalen ===
In: Note: Flags indicate national team as defined under FIFA eligibility rules; some limited exceptions apply. Players may hold more than one non-FIFA nationality.

No.	Pos.	Nation	Player
1	GK	IRN	Sosha Makani (loan return from (Iran) Sanat Naft Abadan)
6	DF	NOR	Joackim Solberg Olsen (from (Norway) Sandefjord)
7	MF	DEN	Tonny Brochmann (from (Norway) Stabæk)
10	FW	CAN	Olivier Occéan (from (Norway) Urædd)

Out: Note: Flags indicate national team as defined under FIFA eligibility rules; some limited exceptions apply. Players may hold more than one non-FIFA nationality.

No.	Pos.	Nation	Player
6	DF	SWE	Sebastian Starke Hedlund (loan return to (Sweden) Kalmar)
7	MF	NOR	Ylldren Ibrahimaj (to (Norway) Viking)
8	FW	PLE	Mahmoud Eid (loan return to (Sweden) Kalmar)
12	GK	SWE	Lukas Jonsson (loan return to (Sweden) Sirius)
17	MF	NOR	Sebastian Temte Hansen (on loan to (Norway) Ørn-Horten)
18	FW	NOR	Andreas Hellum (on loan to (Norway) Nybergsund-Trysil)

=== Nest-Sotra ===
In: Note: Flags indicate national team as defined under FIFA eligibility rules; some limited exceptions apply. Players may hold more than one non-FIFA nationality.

No.	Pos.	Nation	Player
4	DF	SWE	Elmin Nurkić (from (Sweden) Varberg)
11	FW	NOR	Jone Rugland (from (Norway) Fram Larvik)
14	DF	DEN	Daniel Arrocha (from (Denmark) HB Køge)
16	DF	NOR	Mads Berg Sande (from (Norway) Fana)
20	MF	SWE	Sherko Faiqi (on loan from (Sweden) IK Sirius)
24	DF	SWE	Jakob Palander (on loan from (Sweden) Trelleborgs FF)
86	MF	DEN	Oliver Kjærgaard (on loan from (Norway) Tromsø)

Out: Note: Flags indicate national team as defined under FIFA eligibility rules; some limited exceptions apply. Players may hold more than one non-FIFA nationality.

No.	Pos.	Nation	Player
4	DF	NOR	Ståle Steen Sæthre (to (Norway) Aalesund)
11	MF	NOR	Joachim Edvardsen (to (Norway) Hønefoss)
15	MF	NOR	Johnny Furdal (to (Norway) Viking)
20	MF	NOR	Halldor Stenevik (loan return to (Norway) Brann)
86	MF	NOR	Andreas Rødsand (to (Norway) Hønefoss)
96	GK	CAN	Yann-Alexandre Fillion (loan return to (Switzerland) FC Zürich)

=== Notodden ===
In: Note: Flags indicate national team as defined under FIFA eligibility rules; some limited exceptions apply. Players may hold more than one non-FIFA nationality.

No.	Pos.	Nation	Player
15	DF	NED	Calvin Mac-Intosch (from (Netherlands) Almere City)
18	DF	ENG	Josh Robson (from (England) Sunderland, previously on loan)
23	MF	NED	Gaston Salasiwa (from (Netherlands) Almere City)
25	MF	NOR	Mathias Gjerstrøm (on loan from (Norway) Strømsgodset)
26	GK	NOR	Jostein Aaland (from Arendal)

Out: Note: Flags indicate national team as defined under FIFA eligibility rules; some limited exceptions apply. Players may hold more than one non-FIFA nationality.

No.	Pos.	Nation	Player
19	MF	NOR	Andreas Hoven (loan return to (Norway) Strømsgodset)
25	GK	NOR	Kim Bjørkesett (to (Norway) FK Tønsberg)
26	MF	NOR	Akinbola Akinyemi (to (Norway) Sandnes Ulf)

=== Sandnes Ulf ===
In: Note: Flags indicate national team as defined under FIFA eligibility rules; some limited exceptions apply. Players may hold more than one non-FIFA nationality.

No.	Pos.	Nation	Player
2	MF	NOR	Akinbola Akinyemi (from (Norway) Notodden)
10	FW	DEN	Sanel Kapidžić (from (Poland) Korona Kielce)
17	FW	NOR	Roger Ekeland (loan return from (Norway) Egersund)
18	DF	NOR	Bjørnar Holmvik (from (Norway) Vidar)
92	GK	DEN	Nicklas Frenderup (from (Norway) Florø)

Out: Note: Flags indicate national team as defined under FIFA eligibility rules; some limited exceptions apply. Players may hold more than one non-FIFA nationality.

No.	Pos.	Nation	Player
77	GK	KEN	Arnold Origi (to (Norway) Kongsvinger)

=== Sogndal ===
In: Note: Flags indicate national team as defined under FIFA eligibility rules; some limited exceptions apply. Players may hold more than one non-FIFA nationality.

No.	Pos.	Nation	Player
5	DF	EST	Nikita Baranov (from (Norway) Kristiansund)
6	MF	NOR	Bjørn Helge Riise (from (Norway) Aalesund)
23	FW	NOR	Trond Olsen (from (Norway) Bodø/Glimt)
26	DF	NOR	Jonas Tillung Fredriksen (from (Norway) Brann)
28	FW	NGA	Akor Jerome Adams (from (Nigeria) Jamba Football Academy)
37	GK	NOR	Håvard Hetle (from (Norway) Sandane)
77	FW	MNE	Staniša Mandić (from (Serbia) Čukarički, previously on loan)

Out: Note: Flags indicate national team as defined under FIFA eligibility rules; some limited exceptions apply. Players may hold more than one non-FIFA nationality.

No.	Pos.	Nation	Player
5	DF	NOR	Victor Grodås (to (Norway) Strømmen)
6	MF	NOR	Henrik Furebotn (retired)
12	GK	NOR	Kjetil Haug (on loan to (Norway) Elverum)
23	MF	NOR	Edin Øy (to (Sweden) Ljungskile)
28	MF	NOR	Johan Hove (to (Norway) Strømsgodset)
25	MF	DEN	Kasper Nissen (on loan to (Norway) Levanger)
37	GK	NOR	Håvard Hetle (on loan to (Norway) Stryn)

=== Strømmen ===
In: Note: Flags indicate national team as defined under FIFA eligibility rules; some limited exceptions apply. Players may hold more than one non-FIFA nationality.

No.	Pos.	Nation	Player
1	GK	CAN	Simon Thomas (from (Norway) Kongsvinger)
3	DF	NOR	Victor Grodås (from (Norway) Sogndal)
9	FW	NOR	Alexander Ruud Tveter (on loan from (Norway) Sarpsborg 08)
18	MF	NGA	Charles Ezeh (on loan from (Norway) Lillestrøm)
20	MF	NGA	Ebiye Moses (on loan from (Norway) Lillestrøm)
77	FW	HAI	Steeve Saint-Duc (on loan from (United States) Los Angeles FC)

Out: Note: Flags indicate national team as defined under FIFA eligibility rules; some limited exceptions apply. Players may hold more than one non-FIFA nationality.

No.	Pos.	Nation	Player
3	DF	NOR	Thor Lange (to (Denmark) Fremad Amager)
9	FW	NOR	Martin Wilhelmsen Trøen (to (Norway) Ull/Kisa)
18	MF	NOR	Mansour Gueye (to (Norway) KFUM Oslo)
20	FW	NOR	Magnus Solum (to (Norway) Elverum)
24	GK	NOR	Oumar Diaby (released)
79	FW	NOR	Sebastian Pedersen (loan return to (Norway) Strømsgodset)

=== Tromsdalen ===
In: Note: Flags indicate national team as defined under FIFA eligibility rules; some limited exceptions apply. Players may hold more than one non-FIFA nationality.

No.	Pos.	Nation	Player
9	MF	NOR	Henrik Johnsgård (on loan from (Norway) Tromsø)
27	MF	NOR	August Mikkelsen (on loan from (Norway) Tromsø)

Out: Note: Flags indicate national team as defined under FIFA eligibility rules; some limited exceptions apply. Players may hold more than one non-FIFA nationality.

No.	Pos.	Nation	Player
6	MF	NOR	Elias Skogvoll (to (Norway) Mjølner)
13	DF	NOR	Jo Nymo Matland (to (Norway) Brattvåg)
16	DF	NOR	Simon Laugsand (to (Norway) Sortland)

=== Ull/Kisa ===
In: Note: Flags indicate national team as defined under FIFA eligibility rules; some limited exceptions apply. Players may hold more than one non-FIFA nationality.

No.	Pos.	Nation	Player
10	FW	NOR	Martin Wilhelmsen Trøen (from (Norway) Strømmen)
24	FW	NOR	Lars-Jørgen Salvesen (from (Norway) Start)
27	MF	NOR	Sebastian Remme Berge (from (Norway) Ullern)

Out: Note: Flags indicate national team as defined under FIFA eligibility rules; some limited exceptions apply. Players may hold more than one non-FIFA nationality.

No.	Pos.	Nation	Player
15	MF	SWE	William Kurtovic (loan return to (Norway) Sandefjord)
37	FW	NOR	Andreas Aalbu (to (Norway) Fredrikstad)

=== Viking ===
In: Note: Flags indicate national team as defined under FIFA eligibility rules; some limited exceptions apply. Players may hold more than one non-FIFA nationality.

No.	Pos.	Nation	Player
4	DF	NOR	Tord Salte (from (France) Lyon U23, previously on loan)
6	DF	ISL	Axel Andrésson (on loan from (England) Reading)
16	FW	NOR	Even Østensen (from (Norway) Staal Jørpeland)
18	DF	NOR	Sondre Bjørshol (from (Norway) Åsane)
20	MF	NOR	Ylldren Ibrahimaj (from (Norway) Mjøndalen)
27	MF	NOR	Johnny Furdal (from (Norway) Nest-Sotra)

Out: Note: Flags indicate national team as defined under FIFA eligibility rules; some limited exceptions apply. Players may hold more than one non-FIFA nationality.

No.	Pos.	Nation	Player
6	DF	NOR	Leo Skiri Østigård (loan return to (Norway) Molde)
8	FW	NGA	Aniekpeno Udo (to (Sweden) Ljungskile)
18	MF	NOR	Julian Ryerson (to (Germany) Union Berlin)
21	MF	ENG	Jordan Hallam (loan return to (England) Sheffield United)
26	MF	NOR	Tore André Sørås (to (Norway) KFUM Oslo)
30	FW	NOR	Stian Michalsen (to (Norway) Arendal)

=== Åsane ===
In: Note: Flags indicate national team as defined under FIFA eligibility rules; some limited exceptions apply. Players may hold more than one non-FIFA nationality.

No.	Pos.	Nation	Player

Out: Note: Flags indicate national team as defined under FIFA eligibility rules; some limited exceptions apply. Players may hold more than one non-FIFA nationality.

No.	Pos.	Nation	Player
4	DF	NOR	Sondre Bjørshol (to (Norway) Viking)
