= Adnan Hadzic =

Norwegian football player (born 1999)

Personal information
- Full name: Adnan Hadzic
- Date of birth: 8 March 1999 (age 27)
- Place of birth: Horten, Norway
- Height: 1.88 m (6 ft 2 in)
- Position: Midfielder

Team information
- Current team: Skeid
- Number: 6

Youth career
- –2015: Ørn-Horten

Senior career*
Years	Team	Apps	(Gls)
2015–2017	Ørn-Horten	45	(6)
2017–2020	Start	37	(1)
2020	→ Sandnes Ulf (loan)	8	(0)
2020–2021	Sandnes Ulf	26	(0)
2021–2022	Fredrikstad	32	(0)
2022–2023	SønderjyskE	12	(0)
2023–2024	KFUM	3	(0)
2024	→ Raufoss (loan)	17	(0)
2025–	Skeid	48	(1)

International career
2017	Norway U18	9	(0)
2018	Norway U19	2	(0)
2019	Norway U20	3	(0)
- * Club domestic league appearances and goals as of 15 November 2026

Adnan Hadzic (born 8 March 1999) is a Norwegian footballer who plays as a midfielder for Skeid.

== Career ==
Hadzic played for Ørn-Horten between 2015 and 2017, before joining Start in the summer of 2017. He made his Eliteserien debut in March 2018 against Tromsø, coming off the bench to substitute Isaac Twum in a 4–1 win.

On 1 August 2020, Hadzic moved to Sandnes Ulf on loan. On 11 September, the move was made permanent, and he signed a contract until December 2022.

On 13 August 2021, Hadzic signed a contract with Fredrikstad, joining them on a deal until 31 December 2024. However, he was bought free by newly relegated Danish 1st Division club SønderjyskE on 3 August 2022, signing a deal until June 2026.

On 31 August 2023, Hadzic moved to Norwegian First Division club KFUM-Kameratene Oslo. On 16 July 2024, Hadzic went on a loan to Raufoss IL.

On 10 March 2025, he signed a contract with Skeid.

== Career statistics ==
=== Club ===
As of match played 26 August 2022

Appearances and goals by club, season and competition
Club	Season	League			National Cup		Other		Total	
Club	Season	Division	Apps	Goals	Apps	Goals	Apps	Goals	Apps	Goals
Ørn-Horten	2015	2. divisjon	10	0	0	0	0	0	10	0
Ørn-Horten	2016	2. divisjon	24	5	1	0	0	0	25	5
Ørn-Horten	2017	3. divisjon	11	1	3	0	0	0	14	1
Ørn-Horten	Total		45	6	4	0	0	0	49	6
Start	2017	1. divisjon	8	1	0	0	0	0	8	1
Start	2018	Eliteserien	16	0	2	0	0	0	18	0
Start	2019	1. divisjon	12	0	1	0	0	0	13	0
Start	2020	Eliteserien	1	0	–		0	0	1	0
Start	Total		37	1	3	0	0	0	40	1
Sandnes Ulf	2020	1. divisjon	22	0	–		0	0	22	0
Sandnes Ulf	2021	1. divisjon	12	0	2	0	0	0	13	0
Sandnes Ulf	Total		34	0	2	0	0	0	36	0
Fredrikstad	2021	1. divisjon	16	0	0	0	0	0	16	0
Fredrikstad	2022	1. divisjon	16	0	3	0	0	0	19	0
Fredrikstad	Total		32	0	3	0	0	0	35	0
SønderjyskE	2022–23	Danish 1st Division	5	0	0	0	0	0	5	0
SønderjyskE	Total		5	0	0	0	0	0	5	0
Career total			153	7	12	0	0	0	165	7
