= Espen Hammer Berger =

Norwegian footballer (born 1994)

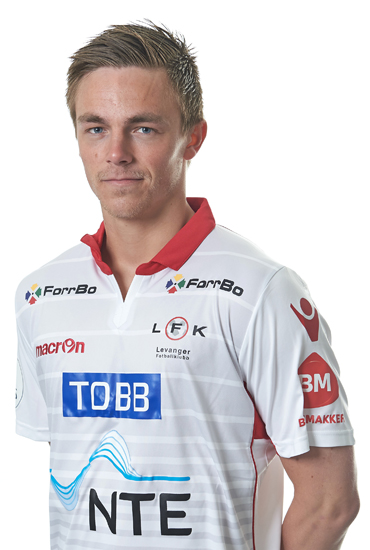

Personal information
- Full name: Espen Hammer Berger
- Date of birth: 9 March 1994 (age 32)
- Place of birth: Levanger Municipality, Norway
- Height: 1.85 m (6 ft 1 in)
- Position: Defender

Team information
- Current team: Sandnes Ulf
- Number: 3

Youth career
- 2010–2013: Levanger

Senior career*
Years	Team	Apps	(Gls)
2012–2018	Levanger	126	(0)
2018–2020	Start	37	(0)
2020–	Sandnes Ulf	171	(10)
- * Club domestic league appearances and goals as of 3 November 2025

Espen Hammer Berger (born 9 March 1994) is a Norwegian footballer who plays as a defender for 1. divisjon side Sandnes Ulf.

== Career ==
He played for Levanger between 2012 and 2018, joining Start one game into the 2018 season. He then made his Eliteserien debut in April 2018 against Rosenborg. In 2020 he joined 1. divisjon side Sandnes Ulf.

== Career statistics ==
=== Club ===
As of match played 21 April 2025

Appearances and goals by club, season and competition
Club	Season	League			National Cup		Europe		Total	
Club	Season	Division	Apps	Goals	Apps	Goals	Apps	Goals	Apps	Goals
Levanger	2012	Oddsen-ligaen	14	0	0	0	-		14	0
Levanger	2013	Oddsen-ligaen	15	0	0	0	-		15	0
Levanger	2014	Oddsen-ligaen	24	0	2	1	-		26	1
Levanger	2015	OBOS-ligaen	24	0	2	0	-		26	0
Levanger	2016	OBOS-ligaen	20	0	1	0	-		21	0
Levanger	2017	OBOS-ligaen	28	0	4	0	-		32	0
Levanger	2018	OBOS-ligaen	1	0	0	0	-		1	0
Levanger	Total		126	0	9	1	-	-	135	1
Start	2018	Eliteserien	19	0	4	1	-		23	1
Start	2019	OBOS-ligaen	18	0	1	0	-		19	0
Start	Total		37	0	5	1	-	-	42	1
Sandnes Ulf	2020	OBOS-ligaen	29	0	0	0	-		29	0
Sandnes Ulf	2021	OBOS-ligaen	28	2	3	0	-		31	2
Sandnes Ulf	2022	OBOS-ligaen	30	5	3	1	-		33	6
Sandnes Ulf	2023	OBOS-ligaen	29	1	2	0	-		31	1
Sandnes Ulf	2024	OBOS-ligaen	28	0	5	1	-		33	1
Sandnes Ulf	2025	PostNord-ligaen	3	1	0	0	-		3	1
Sandnes Ulf	Total		147	9	13	2	-	-	160	11
Career total			310	9	27	4	-	-	357	13
