= Henrik Robstad =

Norwegian footballer (born 1991)

Personal information
- Full name: Henrik Robstad
- Date of birth: 12 May 1991 (age 35)
- Place of birth: Kristiansand, Norway
- Height: 1.84 m (6 ft 1/2 in)
- Position: Left back

Team information
- Current team: Start
- Number: 15

Youth career
- Hånes
- Start

Senior career*
Years	Team	Apps	(Gls)
2009–2013	Vindbjart	37	(9)
2014–2015	Jerv	53	(7)
2016–2023	Start	200	(4)
- * Club domestic league appearances and goals as of 1 December 2023

Henrik Robstad (born 12 May 1991) is a former Norwegian footballer who plays as a defender. Before his retirement he played for Start in the OBOS-ligaen.

He played youth football for Hånes IF and IK Start, but was dismissed from the latter club who did not perceive him as good enough. While skiing at the resort Hovden, he met Vindbjart FK head coach Steinar Skeie, who invited him to trial. Robstad subsequently joined Vindbjart and played five seasons there, only interrupted by a US college spell in 2011–12.

Ahead of the 2014 season he went from the third to the second tier, joining newly promoted FK Jerv. He joined Start ahead of the 2016 season.

== Career statistics ==
As of match played 3 May 2023.

Club	Season	Division	League		Cup		Total	
Club	Season	Division	Apps	Goals	Apps	Goals	Apps	Goals
2014	Jerv	Oddsen-ligaen	25	5	1	0	26	5
2015	Jerv	OBOS-ligaen	28	2	2	1	30	3
2016	Start	Tippeligaen	30	0	3	0	33	0
2017	Start	OBOS-ligaen	23	1	2	0	25	1
2018	Start	Eliteserien	21	0	3	0	24	0
2019	Start	OBOS-ligaen	27	1	1	0	28	1
2020	Start	Eliteserien	20	0	0	0	20	0
2021	Start	OBOS-ligaen	28	2	2	0	30	2
2022	Start	OBOS-ligaen	23	0	2	0	25	0
2023	Start	OBOS-ligaen	5	0	1	0	6	0
Career Total			230	11	17	1	247	12
