= Ibrahim Mensah =

Ghanaian footballer

Personal information
- Full name: Ibrahim Arafat Mensah
- Date of birth: 11 January 1995 (age 31)
- Place of birth: Ghana
- Height: 1.81 m (5 ft 11 1/2 in)
- Positions: Left winger; forward

Team information
- Current team: Slovan

Youth career
- Paços de Ferreira

Senior career*
Years	Team	Apps	(Gls)
2016	Bravo	13	(14)
2016–2017	Krško	27	(4)
2017–2018	Aluminij	34	(10)
2018–2019	IK Start	2	(0)
2019–2021	Bravo	23	(5)
2021	→ Triglav Kranj (loan)	6	(1)
2021–	Slovan	4	(1)
- * Club domestic league appearances and goals as of 5 September 2021

Ibrahim Arafat Mensah (born 11 January 1995) is a Ghanaian professional footballer who plays for Slovan.

== Career ==
On 16 August 2018, IK Start announced the signing of Mensah from NK Aluminij. After a half year at the club, it was announced on 13 March 2019 that Mensah's contract had been terminated by mutual consent.

== Career statistics ==
=== Club ===
As of match played 1 November 2018

Appearances and goals by club, season and competition
Club	Season	League			National Cup		Continental		Other		Total	
Club	Season	Division	Apps	Goals	Apps	Goals	Apps	Goals	Apps	Goals	Apps	Goals
Bravo	2015–16	Slovenian Third League	13	14	—		—		—		13	14
Krško	2016–17	Slovenian PrvaLiga	27	4	3	1	—		—		30	5
Aluminij	2017–18	Slovenian PrvaLiga	30	9	5	3	—		—		35	12
Aluminij	2018–19	Slovenian PrvaLiga	4	1	0	0	—		—		4	1
Aluminij	Total		34	10	5	3	0	0	0	0	39	13
Start	2018	Eliteserien	2	0	1	0	—		—		3	0
Career total			76	28	9	4	0	0	0	0	85	32
