= Herolind Shala =

Footballer (born 1992)

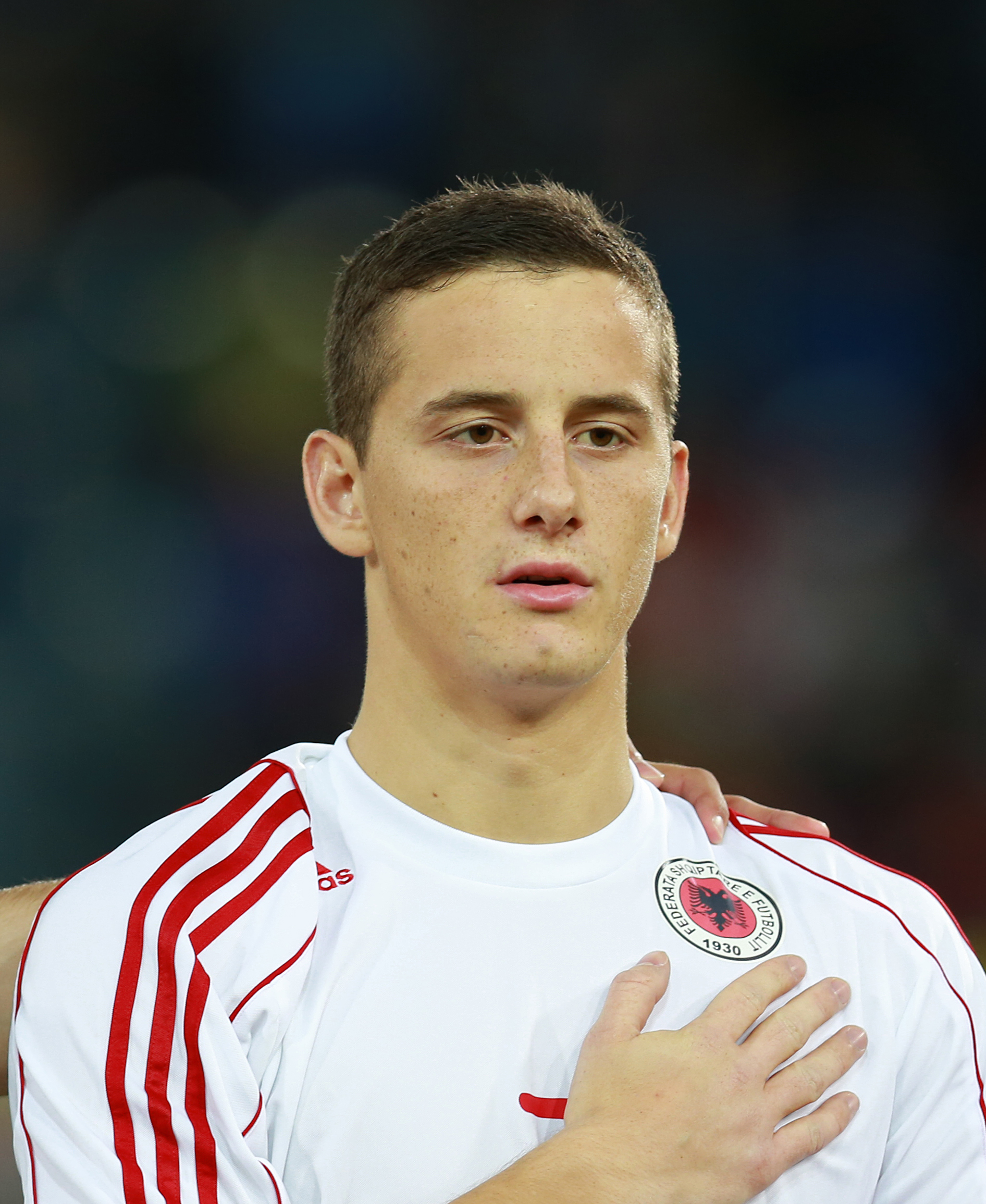
- Shala with Albania U21 in March 2014

Personal information
- Date of birth: 1 February 1992 (age 34)
- Place of birth: Porsgrunn, Norway
- Height: 1.78 m (5 ft 10 in)
- Position: Midfielder

Team information
- Current team: Feronikeli
- Number: 17

Youth career
- –2007: Tollnes
- 2007–2011: Notodden

Senior career*
Years	Team	Apps	(Gls)
2008–2011	Notodden	50	(30)
2011–2015	Odd	90	(20)
2015–2017	Sparta Prague	3	(0)
2015–2016	→ Slovan Liberec (loan)	24	(6)
2016–2017	→ Kasımpaşa (loan)	10	(1)
2017–2018	Lyngby	20	(2)
2018–2019	IK Start	14	(3)
2019–2021	Vålerenga	48	(8)
2021	Stabæk	11	(0)
2021–2024	Erzurumspor FK	60	(1)
2024–2025	IK Start	4	(0)
2025	Partizani Tirana	1	(0)
2026–	Feronikeli	0	(0)

International career
2009	Norway U17	2	(0)
2012	Norway U21	1	(0)
2013–2014	Albania U21	7	(2)
2014–2016	Albania	6	(0)
2016–2021	Kosovo	27	(0)
- * Club domestic league appearances and goals as of 26 February 2026

Herolind Shala (born 1 February 1992) is a professional footballer who plays as a midfielder for Kosovo First League club Feronikeli.

Shala progressed through the youth academies of Tollnes and Notodden, where he also began his professional career and later played for Odd before moving abroad to Sparta Prague in 2015. During his time at the Czech club, he had loan spells at Slovan Liberec and Kasımpaşa. He subsequently played for Lyngby, IK Start, Vålerenga, Stabæk, Erzurumspor FK, and returned to IK Start before joining Partizani Tirana and later Feronikeli.

At international level, Shala represented Norway at youth level before switching allegiance to Albania, playing for the under-21 and senior national teams. He later changed international allegiance to Kosovo and earned 27 caps for the Kosovo national team between 2016 and 2021.

== Club career ==
=== Sparta Prague ===
On 11 January 2015, Shala joined Czech First League side Sparta Prague. On 23 February 2015, he made his debut in a 4–1 home win against Příbram after being named in the starting line-up.

=== Lyngby ===
On 30 August 2017, Shala joined Danish Superliga side Lyngby. On 19 November 2017, he made his debut in a 3–1 home defeat against Randers after coming on as a substitute at 69th minute in place of Martin Ørnskov.

=== IK Start ===
On 4 August 2018, Shala joined with the newly promoted team of Eliteserien side IK Start, on a season-long contract. On 6 August 2018, he made his debut in a 4–1 away defeat against Brann after coming on as a substitute at 70th minute in place of Tobias Christensen.

=== Vålerenga ===
On 11 February 2019, Shala joined Eliteserien side Vålerenga, on a two-year contract. On 30 March 2019, he made his debut in a 2–0 home win against Mjøndalen after being named in the starting line-up.

=== Stabæk ===
On 5 March 2021, Shala joined Eliteserien side Stabæk. On 19 May 2021, he made his debut against his former club Odd after being named in the starting line-up and assists in his side's two goals during a 2–2 home draw.

=== Erzurumspor FK ===
On 9 September 2021, Stabæk announced the transfer of Shala to TFF First League club Erzurumspor FK. That same day, the club confirmed that Shala's transfer was permanent.

== International career ==
=== Norway ===
From 2009, until 2012, Shala has been part of Norway at youth international level, respectively has been part of the U17 and U21 teams and he with these teams played three matches, which were friendly matches.

=== Albania ===
==== Under-21 ====
In May 2013. When he was called up for both the Norwegian and the Albanian under-21 team, he withdrew from the Norwegian squad as he wanted to represent Albania instead. On 11 July 2013, he made his debut for the Albanian U-21 team against Bosnia and Herzegovina U21 by playing full 90-minutes.

On 5 March 2014, he was called up for the closing match of the 2015 UEFA European Under-21 qualification against Austria. He played as a starter and scored the last goal for his side in the 57th minute, where the match finished in an away 1–3 victory with other goals scored by Enis Gavazaj and Vasil Shkurti.

==== Senior ====
On 7 September 2014, Shala received his first senior national team call-up by the Albania national team coach Gianni De Biasi for the UEFA Euro 2016 qualifying match against Portugal. On 14 November 2014, he made his debut for senior team in the "Group I" Friendly Match against the Euro 2016 hosts, France, by coming on as a substitute in the 76th minute. In the other match against Italy, he played once again as a substitute at this time in the 71st minute.

=== Kosovo ===
On 30 August 2016, Shala received a call-up from Kosovo for a 2018 FIFA World Cup qualification match against Finland. On 6 October 2016, he made his debut with Kosovo in a 2018 FIFA World Cup qualification match against Croatia after coming on as a substitute at 77th minute in place of Arbër Zeneli.

== Personal life ==
Shala was born in Porsgrunn, Norway to Kosovo Albanian parents from Drenas. His family belong to the Shala tribe. He and his family speak Albanian in the Gheg dialect of the language.

== Career statistics ==
=== Club ===
As of 4 April 2024

Appearances and goals by club, season and competition
Club	Season	League			Cup		Europe (Note: Including continental competitions, such as UEFA Champions League and UEFA Europa League)		Total	
Club	Season	Division	Apps	Goals	Apps	Goals	Apps	Goals	Apps	Goals
Odd	2011	Tippeligaen	4	0	0	0	—		4	0
Odd	2012	Tippeligaen	26	3	3	0	—		29	3
Odd	2013	Tippeligaen	30	8	3	0	—		33	8
Odd	2014	Tippeligaen	30	9	6	5	—		36	14
Odd	Total		90	20	12	5	—		102	25
Sparta Prague	2014–15	Czech First League	3	0	1	0	—		4	0
Slovan Liberec (loan)	2015–16	Czech First League	24	6	4	0	9	1	36	7
Kasımpaşa (loan)	2016–17	Süper Lig	10	1	7	2	—		17	3
Lyngby	2017–18	Danish Superliga	15	2	1	0	—		16	2
Start	2018	Eliteserien	14	3	1	1	—		15	4
Vålerenga	2019	Eliteserien	21	6	1	0	—		22	6
Vålerenga	2020	Eliteserien	24	2	0	0	—		24	2
Vålerenga	Total		45	8	1	0	—		46	8
Stabæk	2021	Eliteserien	11	0	2	0	—		13	0
Erzurumspor F.K.	2021–22	TFF First League	24	1	1	0	—		25	1
Erzurumspor F.K.	2022–23	TFF First League	28	0	0	0	—		28	0
Erzurumspor F.K.	2023–24	TFF First League	9	0	1	0	—		10	0
Career total			211	40	29	8	9	1	248	50

=== International ===
Appearances and goals by national team and year
National team	Year	Apps	Goals
Albania
Albania	2014	2	0
Albania	2015	2	0
Albania	2016	2	0
Total		6	0
Kosovo
Kosovo	2016	3	0
Kosovo	2017	1	0
Kosovo	2018	9	0
Kosovo	2019	3	0
Kosovo	2020	7	0
Kosovo	2021	4	0
Total		33	0

== Honours ==
Odd

- Norwegian Cup runner-up: 2014
