= Michael Ogungbaro =

Nigerian footballer

Personal information
- Full name: Michael Olusoji Ogungbaro
- Date of birth: 10 July 1996 (age 30)
- Place of birth: Eruwa, Nigeria
- Height: 1.88 m (6 ft 2 in)
- Positions: Defensive midfielder; centre back

Team information
- Current team: Jaro
- Number: 4

Youth career
- –2016: Midtjylland

Senior career*
Years	Team	Apps	(Gls)
2016–2017	Jerv	49	(5)
2018–2019	Start	0	(0)
2018	→ Åsane (loan)	27	(4)
2019	→ Jerv (loan)	7	(0)
2019–2020	Bravo	3	(0)
2020–2023	KTP	77	(4)
2024–	Jaro	76	(5)
- * Club domestic league appearances and goals as of 13 November 2026

Michael Ogungbaro (born 10 July 1996) is a Nigerian footballer who plays as a defensive midfielder for Finnish club FF Jaro in Veikkausliiga.

== Career ==
He moved to Norway and FK Jerv from Midtjylland ahead of the 2016 season. Bought by IK Start in 2018, he was immediately loaned out to Åsane in the entire 2018 season and Jerv in the first half of 2019.

In the 2019 Start released him, only to see him being picked up by Slovene club NK Bravo. (Note: Michael Ogungbaro at the Norwegian Football Federation (in Norwegian)) He made his Slovenian Prva Liga debut in September 2019 against NK Rudar Velenje. (Note: Michael Ogungbaro at Soccerway. Retrieved 12 September 2024.)

After playing for Finnish club Kotkan Työväen Palloilijat (KTP) for four seasons, Ogungbaro signed with FF Jaro in Finnish second-tier Ykkösliiga on 4 April 2024.

== Career statistics ==
As of 13 November 2026

Appearances and goals by club, season and competition
Club	Season	League			Cup (Note: Includes Norwegian Cup and Suomen Cup)		Other		Total	
Club	Season	Division	Apps	Goals	Apps	Goals	Apps	Goals	Apps	Goals
Jerv	2016	1. divisjon	28	4	1	1	–		29	5
Jerv	2017	1. divisjon	21	1	2	0	–		23	1
Jerv	Total		49	5	3	1	0	0	52	6
Start	2018	Eliteserien	0	0	0	0	–		0	0
Åsane (loan)	2018	1. divisjon	27	4	2	0	–		29	4
Jerv (loan)	2019	1. divisjon	7	0	2	0	–		9	0
Bravo	2019–20	Slovenian PrvaLiga	3	0	0	0	–		3	0
KTP	2020	Ykkönen	14	2	0	0	–		14	2
KTP	2021	Veikkausliiga	23	1	1	0	–		24	1
KTP	2022	Ykkönen	16	0	3	0	4 (Note: Includes Ykköscup)	0	23	0
KTP	2023	Veikkausliiga	24	1	5	0	5 (Note: Includes Finnish League Cup)	0	34	1
KTP	Total		77	4	9	0	9	0	95	4
Jaro	2024	Ykkösliiga	28	2	2	0	0	0	30	2
Jaro	2025	Veikkausliiga	26	3	4	1	3	0	33	4
Jaro	2026	Veikkausliiga	24	0	2	0	5	0	31	0
Jaro	Total		78	5	8	1	8	0	94	6
Career total			242	18	24	2	17	0	283	20

== Honours ==
Jaro

- Ykkösliiga runner-up: 2024

KTP

- Ykkönen: 2022
- Ykkönen runner-up: 2020
