= Adeleke Akinyemi =

Nigerian professional footballer

Personal information
- Full name: Adeleke Akinola Akinyemi
- Date of birth: 11 August 1998 (age 28)
- Place of birth: Lagos, Nigeria
- Height: 1.88 m (6 ft 2 in)
- Position: Forward

Team information
- Current team: Neftçi
- Number: 26

Youth career
- Real Sapphire

Senior career*
Years	Team	Apps	(Gls)
2015	Serdarlı GB	13	(10)
2015–2016	Skënderbeu Korçë	0	(0)
2015–2016	→ Trepça'89 (loan)	16	(10)
2017–2018	Ventspils	40	(23)
2018–2021	Start	32	(3)
2020	→ HamKam (loan)	8	(0)
2021–2023	KF Laçi	35	(9)
2023–2024	Karviná	46	(10)
2024	Karviná B	3	(1)
2024–2025	Ilves	28	(5)
2026–	Gnistan	22	(13)
2026–	Neftçi	5	(2)
- * Club domestic league appearances and goals as of 2 November 2026

Adeleke Akinola Akinyemi (born 11 August 1998) is a Nigerian professional footballer playing as a forward for Azerbaijan Premier League club Neftçi.

== Club career ==
=== Serdarlı GB ===
On 24 January 2015, Akinyemi signed for KTFF Süper Lig side Serdarlı GB. He played 13 matches in the league, scoring 10 goals. In total, he played 17 matches and scored 11 goals for the Turkish Cypriot side during the 2014–15 season.

=== Ventspils ===
In early August 2018, Akinyemi went AWOL, resulting in his club, FK Ventspils filling a missing persons report amid fear the player had been kidnapped. Akinyemi returned to Ventspils a few days later, 13 August, playing in their win over FK Liepāja on the same day.

=== Start ===
On 16 August 2018, IK Start announced the signing of Akinyemi, on a contract until the end of the 2021 season, from FK Ventspils. After scoring 3 goals in Start's 2018 campaign which ended in relegation, in the 2019 1. divisjon season opener he broke his ankle. He was sidelined for a long time and failed to break into Start's first team after that. The former top scorer did not manage any goals during a loan to Hamkam in 2020 either. Following a goalless league run in 2021, Start decided to release him after the end of the 2021 season.

=== Karviná ===
On 6 February 2023, Karviná announced the signing of Akinyemi, from KF Laçi.

=== Ilves ===
On 27 August 2024, Akinyemi joined Ilves in Finnish Veikkausliiga, signing a deal for the rest of the season with an option for the 2025. On 1 September, Akiyemi scored in his Ilves debut, in a 1–1 away draw against Gnistan in the league. On 18 February 2024, he signed a new 1+1-year deal with Ilves.

=== Neftçi ===
On 7 September 2026, Azerbaijan Premier League club Neftçi announced the signing of Adeleke Akinyemi to a two-year contract, with the option of an additional year.

== Career statistics ==
=== Club ===
As of 27 July 2026

Appearances and goals by club, season and competition
Club	Season	League			National Cup		Continental		Other		Total	
Club	Season	Division	Apps	Goals	Apps	Goals	Apps	Goals	Apps	Goals	Apps	Goals
Serdarlı GB	2014–15	KTFF Süper Lig	13	10	–		–		–		13	10
Skënderbeu Korçë	2015–16	Kategoria Superiore	0	0	0	0	0	0	–		0	0
Trepça'89 (loan)	2015–16	Kosovo Superleague	16	10	–		–		–		16	10
Ventspils	2017	Virslīga	23	10	6	7	1	0	–		30	17
Ventspils	2018	Virslīga	17	13	1	0	4	7	–		22	20
Ventspils	Total		40	23	7	7	5	7	–		52	37
Start	2018	Eliteserien	12	3	2	0	–		–		14	3
Start	2019	1. divisjon	1	0	0	0	–		0	0	1	0
Start	2020	Eliteserien	3	0	–		–		–		3	0
Start	2021	1. divisjon	16	0	3	4	–		–		19	4
Start	Total		32	3	5	4	–		–		37	7
HamKam (loan)	2020	1. divisjon	8	0	–		–		–		8	0
KF Laçi	2021–22	Kategoria Superiore	16	3	3	2	–		–		19	5
KF Laçi	2022–23	Kategoria Superiore	19	6	1	0	4	0	–		24	6
KF Laçi	Total		35	9	4	2	4	0	–		43	11
Karviná	2022–23	FNL	14	6	–		–		–		14	6
Karviná	2023–24	Czech First League	32	4	1	0	–		–		33	4
Karviná	Total		46	10	1	0	–		–		47	10
Karviná B	2023–24	MSFL	1	0	–		–		–		1	0
Karviná B	2024–25	MSFL	2	1	–		–		–		2	1
Karviná B	Total		3	1	–		–		–		3	1
Ilves	2024	Veikkausliiga	6	3	–		–		–		6	3
Ilves	2025	Veikkausliiga	22	2	1	0	1	0	2	1	26	3
Ilves	Total		28	5	1	0	1	0	2	1	32	6
IF Gnistan	2026	Veikkausliiga	22	13	0	0	4	2	0	0	26	15
Neftçi	2026–27	Azerbaijan Premier League	5	2	0	0	–		0	0	5	2
Career total			248	46	18	13	14	9	2	1	284	69

== Honours ==
MFK Karviná

- Czech National Football League: 2022–23

Ventspils

- Latvian Cup: 2017

Ilves

- Veikkausliiga runner-up: 2024

Individual

- Virslīga top goalscorer: 2017
- Veikkausliiga Player of the Month: September 2024
