= Sherko Faiqi =

Swedish footballer (born 1999)

Personal information
- Full name: Sherko Faiqi
- Date of birth: 18 July 1999 (age 27)
- Place of birth: Sardasht, Iran
- Height: 1.75 m (5 ft 9 in)
- Position: Central midfielder

Youth career
- Lira BK
- –2013: Sunnersta AIF
- 2013–2017: IK Sirius

Senior career*
Years	Team	Apps	(Gls)
2017–2019	IK Sirius	8	(0)
2018	→ Nest-Sotra (loan)	12	(1)
2019	→ Gefle IF (loan)	8	(1)
2020	AFK Linköping	3	(0)
2020	FC Linköping City	20	(4)
- * Club domestic league appearances and goals as of 21 April 2021

Sherko Faiqi (Persian: شرکو فائقی, born 18 July 1999) is a Swedish footballer who last played as a midfielder for FC Linköping City.

== Club career ==
=== IK Sirius ===
Sherko Faiqi made his Allsvenskan debut for Sirius on 5 November 2017 against AFC Eskilstuna.

== International career ==
=== Youth ===
Faiqi has been called up to the Sweden men's national under-17 football team.

== Career statistics ==
=== Club ===
As of 12 July 2019

Club	Division	Season	League		Cup		Other		Total	
Club	Division	Season	Apps	Goals	Apps	Goals	Apps	Goals	Apps	Goals
Sirius	Superettan	2016	0	0	1	0	—		1	0
Sirius	Allsvenskan	2017	1	0	1	0	—		2	0
Sirius	Allsvenskan	2018	5	0	2	0	—		7	0
Sirius	Allsvenskan	2019	1	0	2	0	—		3	0
Sirius	Total		7	0	6	0	—		13	0
Nest-Sotra	OBOS-ligaen	2018	12	1	0	0	1	0	13	1
Career total			19	1	6	0	1	0	26	1
