= Isaac Twum =

Ghanaian footballer (born 1998)

Personal information
- Date of birth: 14 February 1998 (age 28)
- Place of birth: Koforidua, Ghana
- Position: Midfielder

Senior career*
Years	Team	Apps	(Gls)
2014–2016	Heart of Lions		
2016–2017	International Allies	18	(2)
2018–2020	Start	49	(1)
2020–2022	Mjøndalen	50	(2)
2022–2025	Sogndal	49	(3)

International career^{‡}
- Ghana U17
- Ghana U20
2017	Ghana	1	(0)
- * Club domestic league appearances and goals as of 14 November 2024 ‡ National team caps and goals as of 22:32, 4 July 2018 (UTC)

Isaac Twum (born 14 February 1998) is a Ghanaian professional footballer who plays as a midfielder.

== Club career ==
Twum began his career in his native Ghana, playing for Heart of Lions and International Allies. On 1 December 2017, Start announced the signing of Twum.

== International career ==
After appearing for Ghana U17 and Ghana U20, Twum made his senior debut for Ghana in a 3–0 win against Saudi Arabia on 10 October 2017. Twum was captain of the Ghanaian team that won the 2017 WAFU Cup of Nations, being named Most Valuable Player of the tournament in the process.

== Career statistics ==
As of match played 4 August 2022

Appearances and goals by club, season and competition
Club	Season	League			National Cup		Other		Total	
Club	Season	Division	Apps	Goals	Apps	Goals	Apps	Goals	Apps	Goals
International Allies	2016	Ghana Premier League	18	2	0	0	—		18	2
Start	2018	Eliteserien	13	0	2	0	—		15	0
Start	2019	OBOS-ligaen	26	0	1	0	—		27	0
Start	2020	Eliteserien	10	1	0	0	—		10	1
Start	Total		49	1	3	0	0	0	52	1
Mjøndalen	2020	Eliteserien	11	1	0	0	—		11	1
Mjøndalen	2021	Eliteserien	24	1	2	0	—		26	1
Mjøndalen	2022	OBOS-ligaen	15	0	2	0	—		17	0
Mjøndalen	Total		50	2	4	0	0	0	54	2
Sogndal	2022	OBOS-ligaen	1	0	0	0	—		1	0
Career total			118	5	7	0	0	0	125	5
