= Kristján Flóki Finnbogason =

Icelandic footballer

Kristján Finnbogason
Personal information
- Full name: Kristján Flóki Finnbogason
- Date of birth: 12 January 1995 (age 31)
- Place of birth: Iceland
- Height: 1.90 m (6 ft 3 in)
- Position: Forward

Team information
- Current team: FH
- Number: 9

Youth career
- FH

Senior career*
Years	Team	Apps	(Gls)
2012–2013	FH	2	(0)
2013–2015	Copenhagen	0	(0)
2015–2017	FH	50	(16)
2017–2019	Start	34	(7)
2018-2019	→ IF Brommapojkarna (loan)	12	(2)
2019–2024	KR Reykjavík	78	(19)
2019	→ IF Brommapojkarna (loan)	12	(2)
2024–	FH	39	(4)

International career^{‡}
2011–2012	Iceland U-17	13	(2)
2012–2014	Iceland U-19	18	(6)
2015–2016	Iceland U-21	7	(0)
2017–	Iceland	6	(1)
- * Club domestic league appearances and goals as of 16 November 2026 ‡ National team caps and goals as of 23 January 2020

Kristján Flóki Finnbogason (born 12 January 1995) is an Icelandic football forward who plays for FH.

== Career statistics ==
=== Club ===
As of match played 21 July 2019

Appearances and goals by club, season and competition
Club	Season	League			National Cup		Europe		Other		Total	
Club	Season	Division	Apps	Goals	Apps	Goals	Apps	Goals	Apps	Goals	Apps	Goals
FH	2012	Úrvalsdeild	1	0	0	0	-		-		1	0
FH	2013	Úrvalsdeild	1	0	0	0	-		-		1	0
FH	Total		2	0	0	0	-	-	-	-	2	0
Copenhagen	2014–15	Danish Superliga	0	0	0	0	-		-		0	0
Copenhagen	Total		0	0	0	0	-	-	-	-	0	0
FH	2015	Úrvalsdeild	20	4	3	0	4	2	-		27	6
FH	2016	Úrvalsdeild	16	4	4	2	1	1	-		21	7
FH	2017	Úrvalsdeild	14	8	5	2	4	0	-		23	10
FH	Total		50	16	12	4	9	3	-	-	71	23
Start	2017	OBOS-ligaen	10	4	0	0	-		-		10	4
Start	2018	Eliteserien	13	2	3	0	-		-		16	2
Start	2019	OBOS-ligaen	11	1	1	0	-		-		12	1
Start	Total		34	7	4	0	-	-	-	-	38	7
Brommapojkarna (loan)	2018	Allsvenskan	12	2	0	0	-		-		12	2
Brommapojkarna (loan)	Total		12	2	0	0	-	-	-	-	12	2
Career total			98	25	16	4	9	3	-	-	123	32

== International career ==
Kristján has been involved with the U-19 and U-21 teams, and made his senior team debut against Mexico on 8 February 2017.

=== International goals ===
#	Date	Venue	Opponent	Score	Result	Competition
1	11 January 2018	Maguwoharjo Stadium, Sleman, Indonesia	Indonesia Selection	2–0	6–0	Unofficial Friendly
