= Abubakar Aliyu Ibrahim =

Nigerian footballer

Personal information
- Full name: Abubakar Aliyu Ibrahim
- Date of birth: 18 November 1994 (age 31)
- Place of birth: Nigeria
- Height: 1.74 m (5 ft 8 1/2 in)
- Position: Forward

Team information
- Current team: KÍ Klaksvíkar
- Number: 19

Senior career*
| Years | Team | Apps | (Gls) |
| 2013–2014 | Nasarawa United | | |
| 2015 | Kano Pillars | | |
| 2015–2016 | CA Bizertin | | |
| 2017–2018 | Start | 15 | (4) |
| 2018 | → HamKam (loan) | 17 | (2) |
| 2018–2019 | HamKam | 20 | (3) |
| 2019 | → Notodden (loan) | 13 | (0) |
| 2020– | KÍ Klaksvíkar | 2 | (0) |
| 2021– | Wikki Tourists | | |

International career^{‡}
| 2014 | Nigeria | 5 | (1) |
- * Club domestic league appearances and goals ‡ National team caps and goals as of 22 April 2022

Abubakar Aliyu Ibrahim (born 18 November 1994) is a Nigerian football player, who plays for Wikki Tourists.

== Career ==
Aliyu went on trial with IK Start in February 2017, eventually signing permanently with the club.

He was loaned out to HamKam on 12 March 2018 for the rest of the season. He signed permanently with the club on 16 August 2018.
