= 2013 Aalesunds FK season =

Aalesund
2013 season
- Chairman: Kjell Tennfjord
- Manager: Jan Jönsson
- Stadium: Color Line Stadion
- Tippeligaen: 4th
- Norwegian Cup: Third Round vs Ranheim
- Top goalscorer: League: Abderrazak Hamdallah (15); All: Abderrazak Hamdallah (19)
- Highest home attendance: 10,101 vs Tromsø; 21 April 2013
- Lowest home attendance: 6,925 vs Haugesund; 17 March 2013
- Average home league attendance: 8,196
Home colours	Away colours

The 2013 season was Aalesund's 7th consecutive year in Tippeligaen, and their first season with Jan Jönsson as the club's manager. Aalesund competed in the Tippeligaen, finishing 4th, and the cup where they reached the third Round, losing to Ranheim of the Adeccoligaen.

== Squad ==
As of 13 August 2013

Note: Flags indicate national team as defined under FIFA eligibility rules; some limited exceptions apply. Players may hold more than one non-FIFA nationality.

No.	Pos.	Nation	Player
1	GK	NOR	Lasse Staw
2	DF	NGR	Akeem Latifu (loan from Hødd)
3	DF	NOR	Edvard Skagestad
4	DF	NOR	Jonathan Tollås
5	DF	NOR	Andreas Nordvik
6	MF	MAR	Houcine Zaidoun (loan from OC Safi)
8	MF	NOR	Fredrik Carlsen
9	FW	MAR	Abderrazak Hamdallah
10	MF	NOR	Peter Orry Larsen
11	FW	JAM	Tremaine Stewart
13	GK	NOR	Sten Grytebust
14	MF	NGR	Leke James
15	DF	SWE	Daniel Arnefjord

No.	Pos.	Nation	Player
16	DF	NOR	Hugues Wembangomo
17	MF	JAM	Demar Phillips
18	FW	NOR	Christian Myklebust
19	FW	NOR	Tor Hogne Aarøy
22	DF	NOR	Jo Nymo Matland
23	MF	NOR	Fredrik Ulvestad
24	GK	NOR	Mathias Rasmussen
25	MF	NOR	Lars Fuhre
29	MF	NOR	Adam Sellami
31	MF	CRC	Michael Barrantes
34	FW	NOR	Izatullah Ahmadzei
36	MF	NOR	Thomas Martinussen
37	FW	NOR	Torbjørn Grytten

== Transfers ==
=== Winter ===
In: Note: Flags indicate national team as defined under FIFA eligibility rules; some limited exceptions apply. Players may hold more than one non-FIFA nationality.

No.	Pos.	Nation	Player
1	GK	NOR	Lasse Staw (from (Norway) Lillestrøm)
5	DF	NOR	Andreas Nordvik (from (Norway) Vålerenga)
9	FW	MAR	Abderrazak Hamdallah (from (Morocco) OC Safi)
19	FW	NOR	Tor Hogne Aarøy (from (Japan) JEF United)

Out: Note: Flags indicate national team as defined under FIFA eligibility rules; some limited exceptions apply. Players may hold more than one non-FIFA nationality.

No.	Pos.	Nation	Player
1	GK	NOR	Ole-Christian Rørvik
2	DF	NOR	Amund Skiri (Retired)
9	FW	EST	Sander Post (to (Estonia) Flora Tallinn)
19	FW	NOR	Kjell Rune Sellin (to (Norway) Sandefjord)
27	DF	EST	Enar Jääger (to (Belgium) Lierse)

=== Summer ===
In: Note: Flags indicate national team as defined under FIFA eligibility rules; some limited exceptions apply. Players may hold more than one non-FIFA nationality.

No.	Pos.	Nation	Player
2	DF	NGR	Akeem Latifu (loan from (Norway) Hødd)
6	MF	MAR	Houcine Zaidoun (loan from (Morocco) OC Safi)

Out: Note: Flags indicate national team as defined under FIFA eligibility rules; some limited exceptions apply. Players may hold more than one non-FIFA nationality.

No.	Pos.	Nation	Player
7	MF	JAM	Jason Morrison

== Competitions ==
=== Tippeligaen ===
==== Results summary ====
Overall								Home						Away					
Pld	W	D	L	GF	GA	GD	Pts	W	D	L	GF	GA	GD	W	D	L	GF	GA	GD
30	14	7	9	55	44	+11	49	7	5	3	30	18	+12	7	2	6	25	26	−1

Last updated: 12 November 2013.
Source: see below

==== Results by round ====
Round	1	2	3	4	5	6	7	8	9	10	11	12	13	14	15	16	17	18	19	20	21	22	23	24	25	26	27	28	29	30
Ground	H	A	H	A	H	A	H	A	H	A	H	A	H	A	H	A	H	A	H	A	H	A	H	A	H	A	H	A	H	A
Result	W	W	W	W	D	L	D	L	W	L	W	L	W	D	D	W	L	W	W	W	D	L	L	L	D	D	L	W	W	W
Position	1	2	2	1	1	1	2	3	2	4	3	5	3	3	3	3	4	3	3	3	4	4	4	4	4	5	6	5	4	4

Updated to match(es) played on 12 November 2013. Source: see below
A = Away; H = Home; W = Win; D = Draw; L = Loss

==== Results ====
16 March 2013 1	Aalesund	3–0	Haugesund	Ålesund
15:30 CET (UTC+1)	Stewart 9'; Barrantes 36', 41'	Summary		Stadium: Color Line Stadion; Attendance: 6,925; Referee: Espen Berntsen

1 April 2013 2	Sandnes Ulf	0–1	Aalesund	Sandnes
18:00 CEST (UTC+2)		Summary	Stewart 52'	Stadium: Sandnes Idrettspark; Attendance: 2,850; Referee: Tore Hansen

7 April 2013 3	Aalesund	4–3	Hønefoss	Ålesund
18:00 CEST (UTC+2)	Barrantes 6'; James 15'; Larsen 60'; Phillips 66'	Summary	Mendy 20'; Larsen 33'; Riski 50'	Stadium: Color Line Stadion; Attendance: 8,362; Referee: Svein Oddvar Moen

14 April 2013 4	Sarpsborg 08	0–2	Aalesund	Sarpsborg
15:30 CEST (UTC+2)		Summary	Hamdallah 44'; James 81'	Stadium: Sarpsborg Stadion; Attendance: 4,017; Referee: Brage Sandmoen

21 April 2013 5	Aalesund	0–0	Tromsø	Ålesund
15:30 CEST (UTC+2)		Summary		Stadium: Color Line Stadion; Attendance: 10,101; Referee: Tommy Skjerven

27 April 2013 6	Vålerenga	2–1	Aalesund	Oslo
18:00 CEST (UTC+2)	Fellah 42'; Abdellaoue 59'	Summary	Ulvestad 83' (pen.)	Stadium: Ullevaal Stadion; Attendance: 10,037; Referee: Dag Vidar Hafsås

4 May 2013 7	Aalesund	2–2	Rosenborg	Ålesund
18:00 CEST (UTC+2)	James 26'; Ulvestad 52'	Summary	Elyounoussi 65'; Chibuike 72'	Stadium: Color Line Stadion; Attendance: 9,385; Referee: Svein Erik Edvartsen

9 May 2013 8	Molde	4–1	Aalesund	Molde
18:00 CEST (UTC+2)	Toivio 25'; Eikrem 35'; Berget 63', 67'	Summary	Barrantes 52'	Stadium: Aker Stadion; Referee: Tom Harald Hagen

12 May 2013 9	Aalesund	7–1	Lillestrøm	Ålesund
18:30 CEST (UTC+2)	Scheel 2' (o.g.); James 41'; Ulvestad 45+2'; Carlsen 59'; Hamdallah 69' (pen.), 77', 82'	Summary	Omoijuanfo 6'	Stadium: Color Line Stadion; Attendance: 7,270; Referee: Ola Hobber Nilsen

16 May 2013 10	Brann	2–0	Aalesund	Bergen
18:00 CEST (UTC+2)	Finne 45'; Sævarsson 52'	Summary		Stadium: Brann Stadion; Attendance: 17,179; Referee: Svein Oddvar Moen

20 May 2013 11	Aalesund	2–0	Odd	Ålesund
18:00 CEST (UTC+2)	Ulvestad 40' (pen.); Hamdallah 54'	Summary		Stadium: Color Line Stadion; Attendance: 7,591; Referee: Brage Sandmoen

24 May 2013 12	Strømsgodset	2–1	Aalesund	Drammen
19:00 CEST (UTC+2)	Diomande 19'; Kovács 43'	Summary	Barrantes 13'	Stadium: Marienlyst Stadion; Attendance: 6,623; Referee: Dag Vidar Hafsås

23 June 2013 13	Aalesund	2–1	Viking	Ålesund
18:00 CEST (UTC+2)	James 20'; Fuhre 57'	Summary	Edmundsson (yellow card) 69'; Ingelsten 90+1'	Stadium: Color Line Stadion; Attendance: 7,256; Referee: Per Ivar Staberg

30 June 2013 14	Start	2–2	Aalesund	Kristiansand
18:00 CEST (UTC+2)	Asante 49'; Vilhjálmsson 61'	Summary	Ulvestad 34'; Larsen 38'	Stadium: Sør Arena; Attendance: 5,295; Referee: Trond Ivar Døvle

6 July 2013 15	Aalesund	2–2	Sogndal	Ålesund
15:30 CEST (UTC+2)	James 29'; Hamdallah 49'	Summary	Mane 40'; Sagna (yellow card) 42' (yellow-red card) 73'; Stamnestrø 81'	Stadium: Color Line Stadion; Attendance: 7,601; Referee: Ola Hobber Nilsen

14 July 2013 16	Haugesund	1–2	Aalesund	Haugesund
15:30 CEST (UTC+2)	Bamberg 34'; Haukås (yellow card) 64' (yellow-red card) 90'; Gytkjær (yellow card) 90+3'	Summary	Larsen 25'; Phillips (yellow card) 39'; Carlsen 60'; James (yellow card) 85'	Stadium: Haugesund Stadion; Attendance: 4,631; Referee: Svein Edvartsen

27 July 2013 17	Aalesund	2–3	Sandnes Ulf	Ålesund
15:30 CEST (UTC+2)	Ulvestad 47' (pen.); Hamdallah 73'	Summary	Torsteinbø 28'; Furebotn 51'; Þorsteinsson 90'	Stadium: Color Line Stadion; Attendance: 7,562; Referee: Trygve Kjensli

4 August 2013 18	Hønefoss	2–5	Aalesund	Hønefoss
18:00 CEST (UTC+2)	Solli 55', 80'	Summary	Barrantes 13'; Matland 20'; Hamdallah 21'; James 35'; Larsen 90+6'	Stadium: Aka Arena; Attendance: 2,568; Referee: Svein Oddvar Moen

11 August 2013 19	Aalesund	3–1	Sarpsborg 08	Ålesund
15:30 CEST (UTC+2)	Hamdallah 29'; Matland 58'; Ulvestad 77'	Summary	Skagestad 88' (o.g.)	Stadium: Color Line Stadion; Attendance: 8,666; Referee: Dag Vidar Hafsås

18 August 2013 20	Tromsø	1–2	Aalesund	Tromsø
18:00 CEST (UTC+2)	Johansen 77'	Summary	Hamdallah 17'; James 23'; Zaidoun (red card) 80'	Stadium: Alfheim Stadion; Attendance: 4,197; Referee: Trond Ivar Døvle

25 August 2013 21	Aalesund	1–1	Start	Ålesund
15:30 CEST (UTC+2)	Barrantes 73'	Summary	Heikkinen 77'	Stadium: Color Line Stadion; Attendance: 8,657; Referee: Brage Sandmoen

31 August 2013 22	Rosenborg	2–1	Aalesund	Trondheim
18:00 CEST (UTC+2)	Mikkelsen 27'; Jensen (yellow card) 64'; Bille Nielsen 85'	Summary	Hamdallah (yellow card) 34'; Matland (yellow card) 58'; Larsen 74'; James (yellow card) 76'	Stadium: Lerkendal Stadion; Attendance: 14,193; Referee: Svein Edvartsen

13 September 2013 23	Aalesund	1–3	Molde	Ålesund
19:00 CEST (UTC+2)	Phillips (red card) 39'; Hamdallah 62'	Summary	Hovland (yellow card) 10' (goal) 26'; Høiland (yellow card) 39' (yellow-red card); Hoseth 45' 67' (pen.)	Stadium: Color Line Stadion; Attendance: 10,082; Referee: Svein Moen

22 September 2013 24	Odds	5–1	Aalesund	Skien
18:00 CEST (UTC+2)	Storbæk 30'; Johnsen 34', 57', 86'; Rashani 41'; Samuelsen (yellow card) 75'	Summary	James 26'; Hamdallah (yellow card) 37'	Stadium: Skagerak Arena; Attendance: 5,564; Referee: Tom Harald Hagen

28 September 2013 25	Aalesund	0–0	Brann	Ålesund
18:00 CEST (UTC+2)		Summary	Pusic (yellow card) 86'	Stadium: Color Line Stadion; Attendance: 7,901; Referee: Brage Sandmoen

6 October 2013 26	Lillestrøm	1–1	Aalesund	Lillestrøm
18:00 CEST (UTC+2)	Stoor (yellow card) 6'; Helstad 74'	Summary	Arnefjord 65'; Aarøy (yellow card) 85'	Stadium: Åråsen Stadion; Attendance: 4,065; Referee: Ola Nilsen

20 October 2013 27	Aalesund	0–1	Strømsgodset	Ålesund
19:00 CEST (UTC+2)	Barrantes (yellow card) 82'; Hamdallah (yellow card) 84'	Summary	Storflor (yellow card) 25'; Horn (yellow card) 29'; Madsen (yellow card) 51'; Kovács 82'	Stadium: Color Line Stadion; Attendance: 6,932; Referee: Espen Berntsen

25 October 2013 28	Viking	1–3	Aalesund	Stavanger
19:00 CET (UTC+1)	Thioune (yellow card) 62'; Sigurðsson 67' de Lanlay (yellow card) 71'; Sulimani (yellow card) 83'	Summary	Hamdallah 24', 51', 53'; Matland (yellow card) 57'; Skagestad (yellow card) 72'	Stadium: Viking Stadion; Attendance: 9,604; Referee: Ken Henry Johnsen

3 November 2013 29	Aalesund	1–0	Vålerenga	Ålesund
18:00 CET (UTC+1)	Hamdallah 27'	Summary	Ogude (red card) 80'	Stadium: Color Line Stadion; Attendance: 8,648; Referee: Svein Edvartsen

10 November 2013 30	Sogndal	1–2	Aalesund	Sogndalsfjøra
18:00 CET (UTC+1)	Flo 88'	Summary	Matland 25'; James 71'	Stadium: Fosshaugane Campus; Attendance: 3,263; Referee: Trond Ivar Døvle

==== Table ====
Pos	Team	Pld	W	D	L	GF	GA	GD	Pts	Qualification or relegation
2	Rosenborg	30	18	8	4	50	25	+25	62	Qualification for the Europa League first qualifying round
3	Haugesund	30	15	6	9	41	39	+2	51	Qualification for the Europa League first qualifying round
4	Aalesund	30	14	7	9	55	44	+11	49	
5	Viking	30	12	10	8	41	36	+5	46	
6	Molde	30	12	8	10	47	38	+9	44	Qualification for the Europa League second qualifying round (Note: Molde qualified for the second qualifying round of the UEFA Europa League as winners of the 2013 Norwegian Cup.)

Source: fotball.no
Rules for classification: 1) points; 2) goal difference; 3) number of goals scored.

=== Norwegian Cup ===
17 April 2013 First Round	Larsnes/Gursken	0–5	Aalesund	Larsnes
18:00 CEST (UTC+2)		Summary	Hamdallah 37', 66', 75'; Tollås 58'; Nordvik 87'	Stadium: Gursken River Plate; Attendance: 1,205; Referee: Even Myrheim

1 May 2013 Second Round	Florø	0–5	Aalesund	Florø
18:00 CEST (UTC+2)		Report	James 52', 80'; Ulvestad 65'; Myklebust 84'; Hamed Allah 86'	Stadium: Florø Stadion; Referee: Jon Ophuus

29 May 2013 Third Round	Ranheim	4–2 (a.e.t.)	Aalesund	Trondheim
18:00 CEST (UTC+2)	Krogstad 17'; Aas 28', 113'; Bye 117'	Summary	James 21'; Martinussen 77'	Stadium: DNB Arena; Attendance: 1,285; Referee: Per Ivar Staberg

== Squad statistics ==
As of 12 November 2013

=== Appearances and goals ===
No.	Pos	Nat	Player	Total		Tippeligaen		Norwegian Cup	
No.	Pos	Nat	Player	Apps	Goals	Apps	Goals	Apps	Goals
1	GK	(Norway) NOR	Lasse Staw	2	0	0+0	0	2+0	0
2	DF	(Nigeria) NGR	Akeem Latifu	11	0	10+1	0	0+0	0
3	DF	(Norway) NOR	Edvard Skagestad	31	0	26+2	0	2+1	0
4	DF	(Norway) NOR	Jonathan Tollås	33	1	30+0	0	3+0	1
5	DF	(Norway) NOR	Andreas Nordvik	14	1	5+7	0	2+0	1
6	MF	(Morocco) MAR	Houcine Zaidoun	5	0	4+1	0	0+0	0
8	MF	(Norway) NOR	Fredrik Carlsen	27	2	20+5	2	2+0	0
9	FW	(Morocco) MAR	Abderrazak Hamdallah	30	19	25+2	15	3+0	4
10	MF	(Norway) NOR	Peter Orry Larsen	22	5	21+1	5	0+0	0
11	FW	(Jamaica) JAM	Tremaine Stewart	9	2	6+2	2	1+0	0
13	GK	(Norway) NOR	Sten Grytebust	31	0	30+0	0	1+0	0
14	MF	(Nigeria) NGR	Leke James	28	13	25+1	10	2+0	3
15	DF	(Sweden) SWE	Daniel Arnefjord	11	1	7+4	1	0+0	0
16	DF	(Norway) NOR	Hugues Wembangomo	13	0	11+0	0	2+0	0
17	MF	(Jamaica) JAM	Demar Phillips	15	1	12+3	1	0+0	0
18	FW	(Norway) NOR	Christian Myklebust	16	1	2+11	0	3+0	1
19	FW	(Norway) NOR	Tor Hogne Aarøy	15	0	2+11	0	1+1	0
22	DF	(Norway) NOR	Jo Nymo Matland	27	3	25+0	3	2+0	0
23	MF	(Norway) NOR	Fredrik Ulvestad	29	8	26+0	7	3+0	1
25	MF	(Norway) NOR	Lars Fuhre	14	1	5+7	1	0+2	0
31	MF	(Costa Rica) CRC	Michael Barrantes	29	7	24+2	7	3+0	0
32	MF	(Norway) NOR	Marius Ødegaard	1	0	0+0	0	0+1	0
33	MF	(Norway) NOR	Daniel Stensøe	4	0	0+2	0	0+2	0
34	FW	(Norway) NOR	Izatullah Ahmadzei	1	0	0+0	0	0+1	0
35	MF	(Norway) NOR	Henrik Rørvik Bjørdal	2	0	0+2	0	0+0	0
36	DF	(Norway) NOR	Thomas Martinussen	17	1	10+6	0	1+0	1
Players away from Aalesund on loan:
Players who left Aalesund during the season:
7	MF	(Jamaica) JAM	Jason Morrison	6	0	4+2	0	0+0	0

=== Goal scorers ===
Place	Position	Nation	Number	Name	Tippeligaen	Norwegian Cup	Total
1	FW	(Morocco)	9	Abderrazak Hamdallah	15	4	19
2	MF	(Nigeria)	14	Leke James	10	3	13
3	MF	(Norway)	23	Fredrik Ulvestad	7	1	8
4	MF	(Costa Rica)	31	Michael Barrantes	7	0	7
5	MF	(Norway)	10	Peter Orry Larsen	5	0	5
6	DF	(Norway)	22	Jo Nymo Matland	3	0	3
7	FW	(Jamaica)	9	Tremaine Stewart	2	0	2
7	MF	(Norway)	8	Fredrik Carlsen	2	0	2
9	MF	(Jamaica)	17	Demar Phillips	1	0	1
9	MF	(Norway)	25	Lars Fuhre	1	0	1
9	DF	(Sweden)	15	Daniel Arnefjord	1	0	1
9				Own goal	1	0	1
9	DF	(Norway)	4	Jonathan Tollås	0	1	1
9	DF	(Norway)	5	Andreas Nordvik	0	1	1
9	FW	(Norway)	18	Christian Myklebust	0	1	1
9	DF	(Norway)	36	Thomas Martinussen	0	1	1
				TOTALS	55	12	67

=== Disciplinary record ===
Number	Position	Name	Tippeligaen		Norwegian Cup		Total	
Number	Position	Name	Yellow card	Red card	Yellow card	Red card	Yellow card	Red card
3	DF	Edvard Skagestad	1	0	0	0	1	0
4	DF	Jonathan Tollås	2	0	1	0	3	0
6	MF	Houcine Zaidoun	0	1	0	0	0	1
7	MF	Jason Morrison	1	0	0	0	1	0
9	FW	Abderrazak Hamdallah	6	0	0	0	6	0
10	MF	Peter Larsen	1	0	0	0	1	0
11	FW	Tremaine Stewart	2	0	0	0	2	0
14	MF	Leke James	4	0	0	0	4	0
15	DF	Daniel Arnefjord	1	0	0	0	1	0
16	DF	Hugues Wembangomo	2	0	1	0	3	0
17	MF	Demar Phillips	4	1	0	0	4	1
19	FW	Tor Hogne Aarøy	2	0	0	0	2	0
22	DF	Jo Nymo Matland	4	0	0	0	4	0
23	MF	Fredrik Ulvestad	1	0	1	0	2	0
31	MF	Michael Barrantes	3	0	2	0	5	0
		TOTALS	34	2	5	0	39	2
