= 2012 Aalesunds FK season =

Aalesund
2012 season
- Chairman: Kjell Tennfjord
- Manager: Kjetil Rekdal
- Stadium: Color Line Stadion
- Tippeligaen: 11th
- Norwegian Cup: Fourth Round vs Sandefjord
- Europa League: Third qualifying Round vs APOEL
- Top goalscorer: League: Michael Barrantes (9); All: Michael Barrantes (10)
- Highest home attendance: 10,247 vs Molde; 12 August 2012
- Lowest home attendance: 1,340 vs Byåsen; 20 June 2012
- Average home league attendance: 9,366

The 2012 season is Aalesund's 6th consecutive year in Tippeligaen, it was Kjetil Rekdal's fourth full season as the club's manager. Aalesunds competed in the Tippeligaen, finishing 11th and the 2012 Norwegian Football Cup, where they were knocked out at the Fourth Round stage by Sandefjord. They also competed in the 2012–13 UEFA Europa League qualifying stages, defeating Tirana of Albania in the Second Round and then losing to APOEL of Cyprus in the Third Round.

== Squad ==
Note: Flags indicate national team as defined under FIFA eligibility rules; some limited exceptions apply. Players may hold more than one non-FIFA nationality.

No.	Pos.	Nation	Player
1	GK	NOR	Ole-Christian Rørvik
2	DF	NOR	Amund Skiri
3	DF	NOR	Edvard Skagestad
4	DF	NOR	Jonathan Tollås
7	MF	JAM	Jason Morrison
8	MF	NOR	Fredrik Carlsen
9	FW	EST	Sander Post
10	MF	NOR	Peter Orry Larsen
11	FW	JAM	Tremaine Stewart
13	GK	NOR	Sten Grytebust
14	MF	NGR	Leke James
15	DF	SWE	Daniel Arnefjord

No.	Pos.	Nation	Player
16	DF	NOR	Hugues Wembangomo
17	MF	JAM	Demar Phillips
18	FW	NOR	Christian Myklebust
22	DF	NOR	Jo Nymo Matland
23	MF	NOR	Fredrik Ulvestad
24	GK	NOR	Mathias Rasmussen
25	MF	NOR	Lars Fuhre
27	DF	EST	Enar Jääger
29	MF	NOR	Adam Sellami
31	MF	CRC	Michael Barrantes
36	MF	NOR	Thomas Martinussen
37	FW	NOR	Torbjørn Grytten

== Transfers ==
=== Winter ===
In: Note: Flags indicate national team as defined under FIFA eligibility rules; some limited exceptions apply. Players may hold more than one non-FIFA nationality.

No.	Pos.	Nation	Player
11	FW	JAM	Tremaine Stewart (from (Jamaica) Portmore United)
14	FW	NGR	Leke James (from (Nigeria) Bridge Boys)

Out: Note: Flags indicate national team as defined under FIFA eligibility rules; some limited exceptions apply. Players may hold more than one non-FIFA nationality.

No.	Pos.	Nation	Player
11	MF	CRC	Pablo Herrera Barrantes (to (Costa Rica) Uruguay de Coronado)
20	FW	NOR	Didrik Fløtre (loan to (Norway) Kristiansund)
30	FW	NGR	Solomon Okoronkwo (to (Hungary) Pécsi)
35	FW	SWE	Jonas Sandqvist (to (Sweden) Örebro)

=== Summer ===
In: Note: Flags indicate national team as defined under FIFA eligibility rules; some limited exceptions apply. Players may hold more than one non-FIFA nationality.

No.	Pos.	Nation	Player

Out: Note: Flags indicate national team as defined under FIFA eligibility rules; some limited exceptions apply. Players may hold more than one non-FIFA nationality.

No.	Pos.	Nation	Player
5	DF	FIN	Ville Jalasto (to (Norway) Stabæk)
6	MF	NOR	Magnus Sylling Olsen (to (Norway) Bodø/Glimt)
19	FW	NOR	Kjell Rune Sellin (loan to (Norway) Hødd)

== Competitions ==
=== Tippeligaen ===
==== Results summary ====
Overall								Home						Away					
Pld	W	D	L	GF	GA	GD	Pts	W	D	L	GF	GA	GD	W	D	L	GF	GA	GD
30	9	11	10	40	41	−1	38	8	5	2	29	15	+14	1	6	8	11	26	−15

==== Results by round ====
Round	1	2	3	4	5	6	7	8	9	10	11	12	13	14	15	16	17	18	19	20	21	22	23	24	25	26	27	28	29	30
Ground	A	H	A	H	A	H	A	H	A	H	A	H	A	H	H	A	H	A	H	A	H	A	H	A	A	H	A	H	A	H
Result	D	D	D	W	L	D	L	W	L	W	D	D	D	D	W	L	W	L	L	W	W	L	L	L	D	W	D	D	L	W
Position	8	12	11	8	10	10	12	11	13	8	7	7	9	8	8	10	10	10	10	10	9	10	10	10	10	9	9	9	11	11

Source: see below
A = Away; H = Home; W = Win; D = Draw; L = Loss

==== Results ====
25 March 2012 1	Stabæk	0–0	Aalesund	Bærum
18:00 CET (UTC+1)		Summary		Stadium: Nadderud Stadion; Attendance: 5,508; Referee: Espen Berntsen

2 April 2012 2	Aalesund	0–0	Tromsø	Ålesund
19:00 CEST (UTC+2)		Summary		Stadium: Color Line Stadion; Attendance: 9,459; Referee: Dag Vidar Hafsås

9 April 2012 3	Sandnes Ulf	1–1	Aalesund	Sandnes
18:00 CEST (UTC+2)	Raskaj 73'	Summary	Arnefjord 56'	Stadium: Sandnes Idrettspark; Attendance: 3,890; Referee: Ken Henry Johnsen

15 April 2012 4	Aalesund	2–1	Odd Grenland	Ålesund
18:00 CEST (UTC+2)	Post 32'; Tollås 75'	Summary	Krogsgård 64'	Stadium: Color Line Stadion; Attendance: 9,922; Referee: Tore Hansen

22 April 2012 5	Hønefoss	3–1	Aalesund	Hønefoss
18:00 CEST (UTC+2)	Bolseth 6'; Riski 50', 76'	Summary	Matland 8'	Stadium: Aka Arena; Attendance: 2,507; Referee: Kjetil Sælen

27 April 2012 6	Aalesund	2–2	Rosenborg	Ålesund
19:00 CEST (UTC+2)	Fuhre 42'; Tollås 90+1'	Summary	Prica 8'; Iversen 84'	Stadium: Color Line Stadion; Attendance: 9,945; Referee: Svein Oddvar Moen

6 May 2012 7	Molde	2–1	Aalesund	Molde
20:00 CEST (UTC+2)	Moström 24'; Hoseth 59' (pen.)	Summary	Arnefjord 38'	Stadium: Aker Stadion; Attendance: 10,352; Referee: Svein Erik Edvartsen

13 May 2012 8	Aalesund	3–1	Strømsgodset	Ålesund
18:00 CEST (UTC+2)	Barrantes 41'; Fuhre 43', 72'	Summary	Diomande 33'	Stadium: Color Line Stadion; Attendance: 8,394; Referee: Tommy Skjerven

16 May 2012 9	Haugesund	4–2	Aalesund	Haugesund
18:00 CEST (UTC+2)	Đurđić 27' (pen.), 29', 45'; Haukås 51'	Summary	Stewart 56'; Arnefjord 61'	Stadium: Haugesund Stadion; Attendance: 4,857; Referee: Anders Johansen

20 May 2012 10	Aalesund	2–0	Brann	Ålesund
18:00 CEST (UTC+2)	Barrantes 17'; Post 46'	Summary	Austin (yellow card) 41' (yellow-red card) 68'	Stadium: Color Line Stadion; Attendance: 9,709; Referee: Tom Hagen

24 May 2012 11	Lillestrøm	0–0	Aalesund	Lillestrøm
19:00 CEST (UTC+2)	Westerberg (yellow card) 47'	Summary	Vile Jalasto (yellow card) 90'	Stadium: Åråsen Stadion; Attendance: 5,171; Referee: Svein Moen

24 June 2012 12	Aalesund	2–2	Sogndal	Ålesund
18:00 CEST (UTC+2)	Post 51'; Arnefjord 90+1'	Summary	Flo 27', 60'	Stadium: Color Line Stadion; Attendance: 8,943; Referee: Per Ivar Staberg

2 July 2012 13	Vålerenga	0–0	Aalesund	Oslo
20:00 CEST (UTC+2)		Summary		Stadium: Ullevaal Stadion; Attendance: 9,488; Referee: Tom Harald Hagen

8 July 2012 14	Aalesund	1–1	Viking	Ålesund
18:00 CEST (UTC+2)	Arnefjord 90'	Summary	Olsen 88'	Stadium: Color Line Stadion; Attendance: 9,001; Referee: Ken Henry Johnsen

15 July 2012 15	Aalesund	3–0	Fredrikstad	Ålesund
18:00 CEST (UTC+2)	Barrantes 8', 88'; Post 25'	Summary	Halvorsen (yellow card) 71' (yellow-red card) 90+3'	Stadium: Color Line Stadion; Attendance: 8,944; Referee: Svein Erik Edvartsen

22 July 2012 16	Brann	2–1	Aalesund	Bergen
16:00 CEST (UTC+2)	Austin 35'; Bentley 88'	Summary	Fuhre 84'	Stadium: Brann Stadion; Attendance: 12,122; Referee: Brage Sandmoen

28 July 2012 17	Aalesund	3–1	Stabæk	Ålesund
18:00 CEST (UTC+2)	Arnefjord 43'; Stewart 65'; Ulvestad 88' (pen.)	Summary	Boli 45+4'	Stadium: Color Line Stadion; Attendance: 9,066

5 August 2012 18	Rosenborg	3–0	Aalesund	Trondheim
20:00 CEST (UTC+2)	Dočkal 36'; Prica 38'; Strandberg 56'	Summary		Stadium: Lerkendal Stadion; Attendance: 11,475; Referee: Kjetil Saelen

12 August 2012 19	Aalesund	0–1	Molde	Ålesund
20:00 CEST (UTC+2)		Summary	Hussain 33'	Stadium: Color Line Stadion; Attendance: 10,247; Referee: Tommy Skjerven

27 August 2012 20	Fredrikstad	1–3	Aalesund	Fredrikstad
19:00 CEST (UTC+2)	Gueye 73'	Summary	Stewart 4', 40'; Barrantes 56'	Stadium: Fredrikstad Stadion; Attendance: 6,279; Referee: Kristoffer Helgerud

2 September 2012 21	Aalesund	2–0	Hønefoss	Ålesund
18:00 CEST (UTC+2)	Barrantes 50'; Tollås 80'	Summary		Stadium: Color Line Stadion; Attendance: 8,920; Referee: Trygve Kjensli

14 September 2012 22	Strømsgodset	4–0	Aalesund	Drammen
19:00 CEST (UTC+2)	Kovács 24'; Johansen 39'; Nuhu 61'; Wikheim 86'	Summary		Stadium: Marienlyst Stadion; Attendance: 5,304; Referee: Tore Hansen

22 September 2012 23	Aalesund	1–2	Lillestrøm	Ålesund
18:00 CEST (UTC+2)	Arnefjord (yellow card) 38'; Ulvestad 83'	Summary	Pálmason (yellow card) 32'; Riise 39'; Bolly 62'; Stoor (yellow card) 90+3'	Stadium: Color Line Stadion; Attendance: 8,970; Referee: Dag Hafsås

30 September 2012 24	Tromsø	1–0	Aalesund	Tromsø
18:00 CET (UTC+2)	Mbodj 7'	Summary		Stadium: Alfheim Stadion; Attendance: 4,275; Referee: Omar Rafiq

6 October 2012 25	Viking	1–1	Aalesund	Stavanger
21:00 CEST (UTC+2)	Berisha 30'	Summary	Matland 52'	Stadium: Viking Stadion; Attendance: 7,541; Referee: Ola Hobber Nilsen

21 October 2012 26	Aalesund	3–1	Vålerenga	Ålesund
19:00 CEST (UTC+2)	Barrantes 49', 68'; James 74'	Summary	Fellah 28'	Stadium: Color Line Stadion; Attendance: 9,246; Referee: Kjetil Saelen

28 October 2012 27	Sogndal	1–1	Aalesund	Sogndalsfjøra
18:00 CET (UTC+1)	Dyngeland 82'	Summary	James 4'	Stadium: Fosshaugane Campus; Attendance: 3,124; Referee: Trygve Kjensli

4 November 2012 28	Aalesund	2–2	Haugesund	Ålesund
18:00 CET (UTC+1)	Barrantes 11'; James 34'	Summary	Haukås 78'; Fevang 87'	Stadium: Color Line Stadion; Attendance: 8,324; Referee: Trond Ivar Døvle

11 November 2012 29	Odd Grenland	3–0	Aalesund	Skien
18:00 CET (UTC+1)	Brenne 20'; Fevang 27'; Johnsen 44'	Summary		Stadium: Skagerak Arena; Attendance: 4,433; Referee: Svein Erik Edvartsen

18 November 2012 30	Aalesund	3–1	Sandnes Ulf	Ålesund
18:00 CET (UTC+1)	James 13'; Matland 51'; Fuhre 59'	Summary	Bertolt 65'	Stadium: Color Line Stadion; Attendance: 8,666; Referee: Ken Henry Johnsen

==== Table ====
Pos	Team	Pld	W	D	L	GF	GA	GD	Pts
9	Lillestrøm	30	9	12	9	46	47	−1	39
10	Odd Grenland	30	11	7	12	40	43	−3	39 (Note: Odd Grenland were deducted 1 point for lack of financial control)
11	Aalesund	30	9	11	10	40	41	−1	38
12	Sogndal	30	8	10	12	29	37	−8	34
13	Hønefoss	30	7	12	11	30	42	−12	33

Source: fotball.no
Rules for classification: 1) points; 2) goal difference; 3) number of goals scored.

=== Norwegian Cup ===
1 May 2012 First Round	Herd	0–1	Aalesund	Ålesund
18:00 CEST (UTC+2)		Summary	Tollås 56'	Stadium: Sparebanken Møre Arena; Attendance: 1,200; Referee: Christina Pedersen

10 May 2012 Second Round	Skarbøvik	0–1	Aalesund	Ålesund
18:00 CEST (UTC+2)		Summary	Phillips 58'	Stadium: Skarbøvik stadion Attendance: 1,100; Referee: Trond Erik Julseth

20 June 2012 Third Round	Aalesund	4–0	Byåsen	Ålesund
18:00 CEST (UTC+2)	Post 59'; Sellin 76'; Ulvestad 86'; Phillips 88'	Summary		Stadium: Color Line Stadion; Attendance: 1,340; Referee: Petter Toppe

5 July 2012 Fourth Round	Sandefjord	2–1 (a.e.t.)	Aalesund	Sandefjord
18:00 CEST (UTC+2)	Dimitriadis 35'; Lamøy 104'	Summary	Morrison 33'	Stadium: Komplett.no Arena; Attendance: 1,512; Referee: Espen Berntsen

=== Europa League ===
==== Qualifying phase ====
19 July 2012 2nd qualifying round 1st leg	Tirana (Albania)	1–1	(Norway) Aalesund	Tirana
19:00 CEST (UTC+2)	Çota 38'	Report	Stewart 57'	Stadium: Qemal Stafa Stadium^{1} Attendance: 2,300; Referee: Aleksei Kulbakov (Belarus)

26 July 2012 2nd qualifying round 2nd leg	Aalesund (Norway)	5–0 (6–1 agg.)	(Albania) Tirana	Ålesund
19:00 CEST (UTC+2)	Barrantes 45+1'; Tollås 48'; James 64', 77'; Stewart 83'	Report		Stadium: Color Line Stadion; Attendance: 4,225; Referee: Arnold Hunter (Northern Ireland)

2 August 2012 3rd qualifying round 1st leg	APOEL (Cyprus)	2–1	(Norway) Aalesund	Nicosia
19:00 CEST (UTC+2)	Mário Sérgio 34'; Aloneftis 80'	Report	Stewart 16'	Stadium: GSP Stadium; Attendance: 16,708; Referee: Emir Alecković (Bosnia and Herzegovina)

9 August 2012 3rd qualifying round 2nd leg	Aalesund (Norway)	0–1 (1–3 agg.)	(Cyprus) APOEL	Ålesund
19:00 CEST (UTC+2)		Report	Adorno 36'	Stadium: Color Line Stadion; Attendance: 5,057; Referee: Hannes Kaasik (Estonia)

- Note 1: Tirana played their home match at Qemal Stafa Stadium, Tirana instead of their regular stadium, Selman Stërmasi Stadium, Tirana.

== Squad statistics ==
=== Appearances and goals ===
No.	Pos	Nat	Player	Total		Tippeligaen		Norwegian Cup		Europa League	
No.	Pos	Nat	Player	Apps	Goals	Apps	Goals	Apps	Goals	Apps	Goals
1	GK	(Norway) NOR	Ole-Christian Rørvik	3	0	0+0	0	3+0	0	0+0	0
2	DF	(Norway) NOR	Amund Skiri	13	0	3+7	0	1+1	0	1+0	0
3	DF	(Norway) NOR	Edvard Skagestad	27	0	12+12	0	1+0	0	1+1	0
4	DF	(Norway) NOR	Jonathan Tollås	36	5	29+0	3	3+0	1	4+0	1
7	MF	(Jamaica) JAM	Jason Morrison	29	1	23+0	0	2+1	1	3+0	0
8	MF	(Norway) NOR	Fredrik Carlsen	17	0	5+6	0	3+0	0	3+0	0
9	FW	(Estonia) EST	Sander Post	28	5	9+13	4	3+1	1	1+1	0
10	MF	(Norway) NOR	Peter Orry Larsen	19	0	12+6	0	1+0	0	0+0	0
11	FW	(Jamaica) JAM	Tremaine Stewart	29	7	13+8	4	4+0	0	4+0	3
13	GK	(Norway) NOR	Sten Grytebust	35	0	30+0	0	1+0	0	4+0	0
14	MF	(Nigeria) NGR	Leke James	15	6	12+0	4	0+0	0	2+1	2
15	DF	(Sweden) SWE	Daniel Arnefjord	30	6	23+0	6	3+0	0	4+0	0
16	DF	(Norway) NOR	Hugues Wembangomo	18	0	8+4	0	2+0	0	3+1	0
17	MF	(Jamaica) JAM	Demar Phillips	24	2	19+1	0	2+2	2	0+0	0
18	FW	(Norway) NOR	Christian Myklebust	17	0	10+2	0	2+1	0	0+2	0
22	DF	(Norway) NOR	Jo Nymo Matland	26	4	20+1	4	1+0	0	3+1	0
23	MF	(Norway) NOR	Fredrik Ulvestad	32	2	24+1	1	1+3	1	2+1	0
25	MF	(Norway) NOR	Lars Fuhre	24	5	8+9	5	2+1	0	4+0	0
27	DF	(Estonia) EST	Enar Jääger	28	0	24+1	0	1+0	0	2+0	0
31	MF	(Costa Rica) CRC	Michael Barrantes	35	10	28+0	9	3+1	0	2+1	1
36	MF	(Norway) NOR	Thomas Martinussen	3	0	0+3	0	0+0	0	0+0	0
37	FW	(Norway) NOR	Torbjørn Grytten	1	0	0+1	0	0+0	0	0+0	0
Players away from Aalesunds on loan:
19	FW	(Norway) NOR	Kjell Rune Sellin	11	1	6+2	0	0+1	1	0+2	0
Players who left Aalesunds during the season:
5	DF	(Finland) FIN	Ville Jalasto	13	0	5+4	0	4+0	0	0+0	0
6	DF	(Norway) NOR	Magnus Sylling Olsen	13	0	7+5	0	1+0	0	0+0	0

=== Goal scorers ===
Place	Position	Nation	Number	Name	Tippeligaen	Norwegian Cup	Europa League	Total
1	MF	(Costa Rica)	31	Michael Barrantes	9	0	1	10
2	FW	(Jamaica)	11	Tremaine Stewart	4	0	3	7
3	DF	(Sweden)	15	Daniel Arnefjord	6	0	0	6
3	MF	(Nigeria)	14	Leke James	4	0	2	6
5	MF	(Norway)	25	Lars Fuhre	5	0	0	5
5	FW	(Estonia)	9	Sander Post	4	1	0	5
7	DF	(Norway)	22	Jo Nymo Matland	4	0	0	4
7	DF	(Norway)	4	Jonatan Tollås	3	1	1	4
9	MF	(Norway)	23	Fredrik Ulvestad	1	1	0	2
9	MF	(Jamaica)	17	Demar Phillips	0	2	0	2
11	MF	(Jamaica)	7	Jason Morrison	0	1	0	1
11	FW	(Norway)	19	Kjell Rune Sellin	0	1	0	1
				TOTALS	40	7	7	54

=== Disciplinary record ===
Number	Position	Nation	Name	Tippeligaen		Norwegian Cup		Europa League		Total	
Number	Position	Nation	Name	Yellow card	Red card	Yellow card	Red card	Yellow card	Red card	Yellow card	Red card
3	DF	(Norway)	Edvard Skagestad	1	0	0	0	0	0	1	0
4	DF	(Norway)	Jonathan Tollås	2	0	0	0	0	0	2	0
5	DF	(Finland)	Ville Jalasto	1	0	0	0	0	0	1	0
6	MF	(Norway)	Magnus Sylling Olsen	2	0	1	0	0	0	3	0
7	MF	(Jamaica)	Jason Morrison	4	0	1	0	2	0	7	0
8	MF	(Norway)	Fredrik Carlsen	2	0	0	0	1	0	3	0
9	FW	(Estonia)	Sander Post	2	0	0	0	0	0	2	0
11	FW	(Jamaica)	Tremaine Stewart	7	0	1	0	0	0	8	0
15	DF	(Sweden)	Daniel Arnefjord	5	0	0	0	0	0	5	0
17	MF	(Jamaica)	Demar Phillips	2	0	0	0	0	0	2	0
22	DF	(Norway)	Jo Nymo Matland	2	0	1	0	0	0	3	0
23	MF	(Norway)	Fredrik Ulvestad	1	0	1	0	0	0	2	0
25	MF	(Norway)	Lars Fuhre	0	0	1	0	0	0	1	0
27	DF	(Estonia)	Enar Jääger	3	0	0	0	1	0	4	0
31	MF	(Costa Rica)	Michael Barrantes	5	0	0	0	0	0	5	0
			TOTALS	39	0	6	0	4	0	49	0
