= 2014 Aalesunds FK season =

Aalesund
2014 season
- Chairman: Kjell Tennfjord
- Manager: Jan Jönsson
- Stadium: Color Line Stadion
- Tippeligaen: 7th
- Norwegian Cup: Fourth Round vs Lillestrøm
- Top goalscorer: League: Leke James (10); All: Leke James (11)
- Highest home attendance: 9,049 vs Rosenborg (5 April 2014)
- Lowest home attendance: 2,589 vs Lillestrøm (27 June 2014)
- Average home league attendance: 7,288

The 2014 season was Aalesund's eight consecutive season in the Tippeligaen, and their second season was with Jan Jönsson as their manager. They finished the season in 7th position, and reached the Fourth round of the Norwegian Cup, where they were defeated by Lillestrøm.

== Squad ==
Note: Flags indicate national team as defined under FIFA eligibility rules; some limited exceptions apply. Players may hold more than one non-FIFA nationality.

| No. | Pos. | Nation | Player |
|---|---|---|---|
| 1 | GK | NOR | Andreas Lie |
| 2 | DF | NGR | Akeem Latifu |
| 4 | DF | NOR | Jonatan Tollås |
| 5 | DF | NOR | Oddbjørn Lie |
| 6 | DF | SWE | Mikael Dyrestam |
| 7 | MF | FIN | Sakari Mattila |
| 8 | MF | NOR | Fredrik Carlsen |
| 10 | MF | NOR | Peter Orry Larsen |
| 13 | GK | NOR | Sten Grytebust |
| 14 | MF | NGR | Leke James |
| 15 | DF | SWE | Daniel Arnefjord |
| 16 | DF | NOR | Hugues Wembangomo |

| No. | Pos. | Nation | Player |
|---|---|---|---|
| 17 | MF | JAM | Demar Phillips |
| 18 | FW | NOR | Christian Myklebust |
| 19 | FW | NOR | Tor Hogne Aarøy |
| 22 | DF | NOR | Jo Nymo Matland |
| 23 | MF | NOR | Fredrik Ulvestad |
| 24 | MF | MAR | El Mehdi Karnass |
| 30 | FW | NOR | Mustafa Abdellaoue |
| 31 | MF | CRC | Michael Barrantes |
| 34 | DF | NOR | Izatullah Ahmadzai |
| 35 | MF | NOR | Henrik Bjørdal |
| 36 | MF | NOR | Thomas Martinussen |
| 37 | FW | NOR | Torbjørn Grytten |

== Transfers ==
=== Winter ===
In: Note: Flags indicate national team as defined under FIFA eligibility rules; some limited exceptions apply. Players may hold more than one non-FIFA nationality.

| No. | Pos. | Nation | Player |
|---|---|---|---|
| 1 | GK | NOR | Andreas Lie (loan return from (Norway) Hødd) |
| 2 | DF | NGR | Akeem Latifu (loan from (Norway) Hødd made permanent) |
| 5 | DF | NOR | Oddbjørn Lie (from (Norway) HamKam) |
| 7 | MF | FIN | Sakari Mattila (from (Finland) HJK) |
| 15 | DF | SWE | Mikael Dyrestam (from (Sweden) IFK Göteborg) |

Out: Note: Flags indicate national team as defined under FIFA eligibility rules; some limited exceptions apply. Players may hold more than one non-FIFA nationality.

| No. | Pos. | Nation | Player |
|---|---|---|---|
| 1 | GK | NOR | Lasse Staw (to (Norway) Bodø/Glimt) |
| 3 | DF | NOR | Edvard Skagestad (to (Sweden) IFK Norrköping) |
| 5 | DF | NOR | Andreas Nordvik (to (Norway) Sarpsborg 08) |
| 6 | MF | MAR | Houcine Zaidoune (loan return to (Morocco) Olympique Safi) |
| 9 | FW | MAR | Abderrazak Hamdallah (to (China) Guangzhou R&F) |
| 25 | MF | NOR | Lars Fuhre (to (Sweden) Hammarby) |

=== Summer ===
In: Note: Flags indicate national team as defined under FIFA eligibility rules; some limited exceptions apply. Players may hold more than one non-FIFA nationality.

| No. | Pos. | Nation | Player |
|---|---|---|---|
| 24 | MF | MAR | El Mehdi Karnass (from (Morocco) Difaa El Jadida) |
| 30 | FW | NOR | Mustafa Abdellaoue (from (Denmark) F.C. Copenhagen) |

Out: Note: Flags indicate national team as defined under FIFA eligibility rules; some limited exceptions apply. Players may hold more than one non-FIFA nationality.

| No. | Pos. | Nation | Player |
|---|---|---|---|
| 11 | FW | JAM | Tremaine Stewart (to (Jamaica) Waterhouse) |

== Competitions ==
=== Tippeligaen ===
==== Results summary ====
| Overall | | | | | | | | Home | | | | | | Away | | | | | |
| Pld | W | D | L | GF | GA | GD | Pts | W | D | L | GF | GA | GD | W | D | L | GF | GA | GD |
|---|---|---|---|---|---|---|---|---|---|---|---|---|---|---|---|---|---|---|---|
| 30 | 11 | 8 | 11 | 40 | 35 | +5 | 41 | 6 | 5 | 4 | 25 | 14 | +11 | 5 | 3 | 7 | 15 | 21 | −6 |

==== Results by round ====
| Round | 1 | 2 | 3 | 4 | 5 | 6 | 7 | 8 | 9 | 10 | 11 | 12 | 13 | 14 | 15 | 16 | 17 | 18 | 19 | 20 | 21 | 22 | 23 | 24 | 25 | 26 | 27 | 28 | 29 | 30 |
|---|---|---|---|---|---|---|---|---|---|---|---|---|---|---|---|---|---|---|---|---|---|---|---|---|---|---|---|---|---|---|
| Ground | A | H | A | H | A | H | A | H | A | H | A | H | A | A | H | A | H | H | A | H | A | H | A | H | A | H | A | A | H | A |
| Result | D | D | L | L | D | L | W | L | D | L | D | L | W | W | L | L | D | W | L | W | L | W | D | W | L | D | W | W | W | W |
| Position | 7 | 10 | 13 | 13 | 14 | 16 | 13 | 14 | 14 | 14 | 13 | 14 | 13 | 13 | 13 | 13 | 14 | 13 | 14 | 13 | 13 | 12 | 11 | 10 | 11 | 11 | 11 | 11 | 7 | 7 |

Updated to match(es) played on 2 November 2014. Source: see below
A = Away; H = Home; W = Win; D = Draw; L = Loss

==== Results ====
| 30 March 2014 1 | Bodø/Glimt | 1–1 | Aalesund | Bodø |
| 15:30 CEST (UTC+2) | Richards 25'; Chatto (yellow card) 68'; Johansen (yellow card) 82' | Summary | Phillips 13' | Stadium: Aspmyra Stadion; Attendance: 3,851; Referee: Svein Edvartsen |

| 5 April 2014 2 | Aalesund | 1–1 | Rosenborg | Ålesund |
| 18:00 CEST (UTC+2) | Barrantes (yellow card) 40'; Larsen 56' | Summary | Chibuike (yellow card) 24'; Riski 75'; Dorsin (yellow card) 85' | Stadium: Color Line Stadion; Attendance: 9,049; Referee: Brage Sandmoen |

| 13 April 2014 3 | Strømsgodset | 2–0 | Aalesund | Drammen |
| 18:00 CEST (UTC+2) | Høibråten (yellow card) 60'; Sætra (yellow card) 74'; Storflor 77'; Sørum 90' | Summary | Arnefjord (yellow card) 44' | Stadium: Marienlyst Stadion; Attendance: 6,721; Referee: Tore Hansen |

| 21 April 2014 4 | Aalesund | 1–2 | Start | Ålesund |
| 15:30 CEST (UTC+2) | Larsen (yellow card) 23'; Grytten (yellow card) 57'; Arnefjord 89' | Summary | Tripic 38'; Asante 59' (yellow card) 90' | Stadium: Color Line Stadion; Attendance: 7,608; Referee: Omar Rafiq |

| 28 April 2014 5 | Lillestrøm | 0–0 | Aalesund | Lillestrøm |
| 19:00 CEST (UTC+2) | Ringstad (yellow card) 69' | Summary | | Stadium: Åråsen Stadion; Attendance: 5,230; Referee: Ola Nilsen |

| 1 May 2014 6 | Aalesund | 1–2 | Viking | Ålesund |
| 15:30 CEST (UTC+2) | Arnefjord (yellow card) 60'; Grytten 76' | Summary | Tollås 35' (o.g.); Sverrisson 56'; Danielsen (yellow card) 62' | Stadium: Color Line Stadion; Attendance: 8,289; Referee: Trond Døvle |

| 4 May 2014 7 | Haugesund | 1–2 | Aalesund | Haugesund |
| 15:30 CEST (UTC+2) | Anyora (yellow card) 18'; Bamberg 65' | Summary | Mattila 44' (yellow card) 25'; Grytten 57'; Arnefjord (yellow card) 77'; Aarøy (yellow card) 89' | Stadium: Haugesund Stadion; Attendance: 4,756; Referee: Svein Erik Edvartsen |

| 10 May 2014 8 | Aalesund | 0–1 | Brann | Ålesund |
| 18:00 CEST (UTC+2) | Barrantes (yellow card) 74'; Mattila (yellow card) 85' | Summary | Vindheim 37'; Barmen (yellow card) 46'; Mojsov (yellow card) 58'; Leciejewski (yellow card) 87' | Stadium: Color Line Stadion; Attendance: 7,198; Referee: Brage Sandmoen |

| 16 May 2014 9 | Aalesund | 2–2 | Sogndal | Ålesund |
| 18:00 CEST (UTC+2) | Arnefjord 84'; Barrantes 87' | Summary | Otoo 39'; Nilsen 75' | Stadium: Color Line Stadion; Attendance: 6,580; Referee: Dag Vidar Hafsås |

| 20 May 2014 10 | Odd | 2–1 | Aalesund | Skien |
| 18:00 CEST (UTC+2) | Samuelsen 18', 30' | Summary | Mattila (yellow card) 40'; Tollås 49' | Stadium: Skagerak Arena; Attendance: 5,652; Referee: Tore Hansen |

| 25 May 2014 11 | Aalesund | 0–0 | Sarpsborg 08 | Ålesund |
| 15:30 CEST (UTC+2) | Phillips (yellow card) 22' | Summary | Tokstad (yellow card) 52'; Kerr (yellow card) 90+3'; Þórarinsson (yellow card) 90+4' | Stadium: Color Line Stadion; Attendance: 7,731; Referee: Omar Rafiq |

| 9 June 2014 12 | Vålerenga | 3–0 | Aalesund | Oslo |
| 15:30 CEST (UTC+2) | Nilsen (yellow card) 15'; Kjartansson 18', 32'; Holm 40' | Summary | Carlsen (yellow card) 59' | Stadium: Ullevaal Stadion; Attendance: 8,554; Referee: Svein Erik Edvartsen |

| 12 June 2014 13 | Aalesund | 3–0 | Sandnes Ulf | Ålesund |
| 19:00 CEST (UTC+2) | Aarøy 34'; Ulvestad 55'; James 63' | Summary | Jaiteh (yellow card) 16' | Stadium: Color Line Stadion; Attendance: 6,703; Referee: Per Ivar Staberg |

| 6 July 2014 14 | Stabæk | 0–2 | Aalesund | Bærum |
| 18:00 CEST (UTC+2) | | Summary | Larsen 44'; James 62' | Stadium: Nadderud Stadion; Attendance: 3,212; Referee: Dag Hafsås |

| 11 July 2014 15 | Aalesund | 0–1 | Molde | Ålesund |
| 19:00 CEST (UTC+2) | | Summary | Forren 33' | Stadium: Color Line Stadion; Attendance: 9,386; Referee: Tommy Skjerven |

| 22 July 2014 16 | Sarpsborg 08 | 3–2 | Aalesund | Sarpsborg |
| 19:00 CEST (UTC+2) | M.Jensen 22'; Kronberg 34', 47' | Summary | Larsen 62'; Abdellaoue 90' | Stadium: Sarpsborg Stadion; Attendance: 3,679; Referee: Trygve Kjensli |

| 26 July 2014 17 | Aalesunds | 1–1 | Lillestrøm | Ålesund |
| 15:30 CEST (UTC+2) | Mattila 66' | Summary | Pálmason 89' | Stadium: Color Line Stadion; Attendance: 6,596; Referee: Per Staberg |

| 3 August 2014 18 | Aalesund | 2–1 | Bodø/Glimt | Ålesund |
| 18:00 CEST (UTC+2) | Barrantes 45'; James 60' | Summary | Grytebust 82' (o.g.) | Stadium: Color Line Stadion; Attendance: 6,747; Referee: Tore Hansen |

| 8 August 2014 19 | Brann | 0–1 | Aalesund | Bergen |
| 19:00 CEST (UTC+2) | | Summary | Orlov 83' | Stadium: Brann Stadion; Attendance: 13,574; Referee: Svein Oddvar Moen |

| 16 August 2014 20 | Aalesund | 3–0 | Haugesund | Ålesund |
| 18:00 CEST (UTC+2) | James 13'; Ulvestad 51' (pen.); Larsen 73' | Summary | | Stadium: Color Line Stadion; Attendance: 6,674; Referee: Omar Rafiq |

| 24 August 2014 21 | Molde | 5–0 | Aalesund | Molde |
| 19:00 CEST (UTC+2) | Gulbrandsen 15'; Linnes 22', 31'; Chima 80', 90' | Summary | | Stadium: Aker Stadion; Attendance: 9,586; Referee: Espen Berntsen |

| 30 August 2014 22 | Aalesund | 2–0 | Strømsgodset | Ålesund |
| 18:00 CEST (UTC+2) | Mattila 54' (pen.), 62' (pen.) | Summary | | Stadium: Color Line Stadion; Attendance: 6,891; Referee: Trygve Kjensli |

| 14 September 2014 23 | Sogndal | 1–1 | Aalesund | Sogndalsfjøra |
| 18:00 CEST (UTC+2) | Arnefjord 54' (o.g.) | Summary | James 43' | Stadium: Fosshaugane Campus; Attendance: 4,517; Referee: Andres Johansen |

| 21 September 2014 24 | Aalesund | 3–0 | Stabæk | Ålesund |
| 18:00 CEST (UTC+2) | Mattila 65'; James 77'; Ulvestad 82' | Summary | | Stadium: Color Line Stadion; Attendance: 8,002; Referee: Tommy Skjerven |

| 28 September 2014 25 | Rosenborg | 3–0 | Aalesund | Trondheim |
| 18:00 CEST (UTC+2) | Jensen 6'; Eyjólfsson 45'; Malec 49' | Summary | | Stadium: Lerkendal Stadion; Attendance: 10,709; Referee: Trond Ivar Døvle |

| 4 October 2014 26 | Aalesund | 2–2 | Odd | Ålesund |
| 15:30 CEST (UTC+2) | Barrantes 40'; Latifu 90+1' | Summary | Johnsen 73', 82' | Stadium: Color Line Stadion; Attendance: 7,804; Referee: Martin Lundby |

| 18 October 2014 27 | Start | 1–2 | Aalesund | Kristiansand |
| 15:30 CEST (UTC+2) | Owello 87' | Summary | James 13'; Larsen 89' | Stadium: Sør Arena; Attendance: 4,835; Referee: Ken Henry Johnsen |

| 26 October 2014 28 | Viking | 1–2 | Aalesund | Stavanger |
| 18:00 CET (UTC+1) | Ingason 80' | Summary | James 20' 24'; Mattila (yellow card) 30'; Arnefjord (yellow card) 42'; Latifu (yellow card) 74' | Stadium: Viking Stadion; Attendance: 10,850; Referee: Brage Sandmoen |

| 2 November 2014 29 | Aalesund | 4–1 | Vålerenga | Ålesund |
| 18:00 CET (UTC+1) | James 26'; Barrantes 34', 52'; O.Lie (yellow card) 63'; Phillips (yellow card) 71'; Abdellaoue 81' | Report | Larsen 11'; Iqbal (yellow card) 36'; Holm (yellow card) 51'; Berre (yellow card) 79' | Stadium: Color Line Stadion; Attendance: 8,766; Referee: Tommy Skjerven |

| 9 November 2014 30 | Sandnes Ulf | 1–2 | Aalesund | Sandnes |
| 18:00 CEST (UTC+2) | Rubio 12' | Summary | Barrantes 74'; Mattila 90+1' | Stadium: Sandnes Idrettspark; Attendance: 2,330; Referee: Brage Sandmoen |

==== Table ====
| Pos | Team | Pld | W | D | L | GF | GA | GD | Pts |
|---|---|---|---|---|---|---|---|---|---|
| 5 | Lillestrøm | 30 | 13 | 7 | 10 | 49 | 35 | +14 | 46 |
| 6 | Vålerenga | 30 | 11 | 9 | 10 | 59 | 53 | +6 | 42 |
| 7 | Aalesund | 30 | 11 | 8 | 11 | 40 | 39 | +1 | 41 |
| 8 | Sarpsborg 08 | 30 | 10 | 10 | 10 | 41 | 48 | −7 | 40 |
| 9 | Stabæk | 30 | 11 | 6 | 13 | 44 | 52 | −8 | 39 |

Source: fotball.no
Rules for classification: 1) points; 2) goal difference; 3) number of goals scored.

=== Norwegian Cup ===
| 24 April 2014 First Round | Bergsøy | 0–5 | Aalesund | Bergsøy |
| 18:00 CEST (UTC+2) | | Summary | Latifu 19'; Barrantes 22'; Aarøy 50', 77'; Bjørdal 67' | Stadium: Havila Stadium; Attendance: 1,247; Referee: Even Myrheim |

| 7 May 2014 Second Round | Træff | 0–3 | Aalesund | Molde |
| 18:00 CEST (UTC+2) | | Summary | Stewart 53'; Barrantes 63'; Matland 73' | Stadium: Reknesbanen; Referee: Kjetil Hansen Thorsø |

| 4 June 2014 Third Round | Kristiansund | 0–1 | Aalesund | Kristiansund |
| 18:00 CEST (UTC+2) | | Summary | Phillips 77' | Stadium: Atlanten Stadion; Attendance: 2,200; Referee: Dag Vidar Hafsås |

| 27 June 2014 Fourth Round | Aalesund | 1–3 (a.e.t.) | Lillestrøm | Ålesund |
| 19:00 CEST (UTC+2) | James 90' | Summary | Moen 51'; Østli 119'; Høiland 120' | Stadium: Color Line Stadion; Attendance: 2,589; Referee: Kristoffer Helgerud |

== Squad statistics ==
As of match played 9 November 2014

=== Appearances and goals ===
| No. | Pos | Nat | Player | Total | | Tippeligaen | | Norwegian Cup | |
| No. | Pos | Nat | Player | Apps | Goals | Apps | Goals | Apps | Goals |
|---|---|---|---|---|---|---|---|---|---|
| 2 | DF | (Nigeria) NGR | Akeem Latifu | 33 | 2 | 29 | 1 | 4 | 1 |
| 4 | DF | (Norway) NOR | Jonatan Tollås | 15 | 1 | 12 | 1 | 3 | 0 |
| 5 | DF | (Norway) NOR | Oddbjørn Lie | 29 | 0 | 24+1 | 0 | 4 | 0 |
| 6 | DF | (Sweden) SWE | Mikael Dyrestam | 13 | 0 | 9+3 | 0 | 1 | 0 |
| 7 | MF | (Finland) FIN | Sakari Mattila | 29 | 6 | 18+7 | 6 | 3+1 | 0 |
| 8 | MF | (Norway) NOR | Fredrik Carlsen | 12 | 0 | 7+3 | 0 | 2 | 0 |
| 10 | MF | (Norway) NOR | Peter Orry Larsen | 28 | 5 | 23+3 | 5 | 1+1 | 0 |
| 13 | GK | (Norway) NOR | Sten Grytebust | 34 | 0 | 30 | 0 | 4 | 0 |
| 14 | MF | (Nigeria) NGR | Leke James | 26 | 11 | 23 | 10 | 3 | 1 |
| 15 | DF | (Sweden) SWE | Daniel Arnefjord | 30 | 1 | 26+2 | 1 | 1+1 | 0 |
| 16 | DF | (Norway) NOR | Hugues Wembangomo | 5 | 0 | 2+2 | 0 | 1 | 0 |
| 17 | MF | (Jamaica) JAM | Demar Phillips | 27 | 1 | 23+2 | 1 | 2 | 0 |
| 19 | FW | (Norway) NOR | Tor Hogne Aarøy | 23 | 3 | 5+14 | 1 | 3+1 | 2 |
| 20 | MF | (Norway) NOR | Thomas Martinussen | 4 | 0 | 0+3 | 0 | 0+1 | 0 |
| 22 | DF | (Norway) NOR | Jo Nymo Matland | 25 | 1 | 11+10 | 0 | 3+1 | 1 |
| 23 | MF | (Norway) NOR | Fredrik Ulvestad | 32 | 3 | 29 | 3 | 2+1 | 0 |
| 24 | MF | (Morocco) MAR | El Mehdi Karnass | 13 | 0 | 8+5 | 0 | 0 | 0 |
| 30 | FW | (Norway) NOR | Mustafa Abdellaoue | 13 | 2 | 6+7 | 2 | 0 | 0 |
| 31 | MF | (Costa Rica) CRC | Michael Barrantes | 22 | 8 | 18+2 | 6 | 2 | 2 |
| 33 | MF | (Norway) NOR | Elias Dahlberg | 2 | 0 | 0 | 0 | 0+2 | 0 |
| 35 | MF | (Norway) NOR | Henrik Bjørdal | 25 | 1 | 14+8 | 0 | 2+1 | 1 |
| 37 | FW | (Norway) NOR | Torbjørn Grytten | 19 | 1 | 10+8 | 1 | 1 | 0 |
| 39 | MF | (Norway) NOR | Vebjørn Hoff | 2 | 0 | 0+2 | 0 | 0 | 0 |
| 40 | MF | (Norway) NOR | Sondre Brunstad Fet | 2 | 0 | 0+1 | 0 | 0+1 | 0 |
Players away from Aalesunds on loan:
Players who appeared for Aalesunds no longer at the club:
| 11 | FW | (Jamaica) JAM | Tremaine Stewart | 8 | 1 | 3+2 | 0 | 2+1 | 1 |

=== Goal scorers ===
| Place | Position | Nation | Number | Name | Tippeligaen | Norwegian Cup | Total |
|---|---|---|---|---|---|---|---|
| 1 | FW | (Nigeria) | 14 | Leke James | 10 | 1 | 11 |
| 2 | MF | (Costa Rica) | 31 | Michael Barrantes | 6 | 2 | 8 |
| 3 | MF | (Finland) | 7 | Sakari Mattila | 6 | 0 | 6 |
| 4 | MF | (Norway) | 10 | Peter Orry Larsen | 5 | 0 | 5 |
| 5 | FW | (Norway) | 19 | Tor Hogne Aarøy | 1 | 2 | 3 |
| 5 | MF | (Norway) | 23 | Fredrik Ulvestad | 2 | 0 | 2 |
| 7 | FW | (Norway) | 37 | Torbjørn Grytten | 2 | 0 | 2 |
| 7 | DF | (Sweden) | 15 | Daniel Arnefjord | 2 | 0 | 2 |
| 7 | FW | (Norway) | 30 | Mustafa Abdellaoue | 2 | 0 | 2 |
| 7 | MF | (Jamaica) | 17 | Demar Phillips | 1 | 1 | 2 |
| 7 | DF | (Nigeria) | 2 | Akeem Latifu | 1 | 1 | 2 |
| 12 | DF | (Norway) | 4 | Jonatan Tollås | 1 | 0 | 1 |
| 12 | MF | (Norway) | 35 | Henrik Bjørdal | 0 | 1 | 1 |
| 12 | FW | (Jamaica) | 11 | Tramaine Stewart | 0 | 1 | 1 |
| 12 | DF | (Norway) | 22 | Jo Nymo Matland | 0 | 1 | 1 |
| | | | | TOTALS | 40 | 10 | 50 |

=== Disciplinary record ===
| Number | Nation | Position | Name | Tippeligaen | | Norwegian Cup | | Total | |
| Number | Nation | Position | Name | Yellow card | Red card | Yellow card | Red card | Yellow card | Red card |
| 2 | (Nigeria) | DF | Akeem Latifu | 2 | 0 | 0 | 0 | 2 | 0 |
| 5 | (Norway) | DF | Oddbjørn Lie | 1 | 0 | 0 | 0 | 1 | 0 |
| 7 | (Finland) | MF | Sakari Mattila | 6 | 0 | 0 | 0 | 6 | 0 |
| 8 | (Norway) | MF | Fredrik Carlsen | 1 | 0 | 0 | 0 | 1 | 0 |
| 10 | (Norway) | MF | Peter Orry Larsen | 1 | 0 | 0 | 0 | 1 | 0 |
| 15 | (Sweden) | DF | Daniel Arnefjord | 5 | 0 | 0 | 0 | 5 | 0 |
| 17 | (Jamaica) | MF | Demar Phillips | 3 | 0 | 0 | 0 | 3 | 0 |
| 19 | (Norway) | FW | Tor Hogne Aarøy | 1 | 0 | 1 | 0 | 2 | 0 |
| 22 | (Norway) | DF | Jo Nymo Matland | 0 | 0 | 1 | 0 | 1 | 0 |
| 23 | (Norway) | MF | Fredrik Ulvestad | 2 | 0 | 0 | 0 | 2 | 0 |
| 24 | (Morocco) | MF | El Mehdi Karnass | 3 | 0 | 0 | 0 | 3 | 0 |
| 31 | (Costa Rica) | MF | Michael Barrantes | 5 | 0 | 0 | 0 | 5 | 0 |
| 35 | (Norway) | MF | Henrik Bjørdal | 1 | 0 | 0 | 0 | 1 | 0 |
| 37 | (Norway) | FW | Torbjørn Grytten | 1 | 0 | 0 | 0 | 1 | 0 |
| | | | TOTALS | 32 | 0 | 2 | 0 | 34 | 0 |
