= Jonatan Tollås =

Norwegian footballer (born 1990)

Personal information
- Full name: Jonatan Tollås Nation
- Date of birth: 1 July 1990 (age 36)
- Place of birth: Ålesund, Norway
- Height: 1.88 m (6 ft 2 in)
- Position: Central defender

Youth career
- 1995–2005: Blindheim
- 2005–2007: Aalesund

Senior career*
Years	Team	Apps	(Gls)
2007–2014	Aalesund	143	(4)
2014–2022	Vålerenga	174	(11)

International career^{‡}
2007	Norway U-17	11	(0)
2008	Norway U-18	8	(0)
2007	Norway U-19	1	(0)
2008–2013	Norway U-21	5	(0)
2013–2014	Norway U-23	2	(0)
- * Club domestic league appearances and goals as of 4 December 2022 ‡ National team caps and goals as of 5 March 2014

Jonatan Tollås Nation (born 1 July 1990) is a former Norwegian professional footballer.

== Club career ==
Tollås came to Aalesund in 2007 from local youth club Blindheim IL. He made his league debut on 1 July 2008 appearing in a 3–1 home win against Strømsgodset IF. He made regular appearances in the following matches, mainly due to center back Benjamin Kibebe being injured. Eventually Tollås would be a part of the a new up-and-coming generation of young players forming the backbone of the Aafk team. By the end of July 2008, ten out of eleven starting players were under the age of 22. His decent performance led to him being scouted along with teammate Peter Orry Larsen by the Serie-A side Udinese, however no deal was reached.

Ahead of the 2009 season Aafk's new coach Kjetil Rekdal signaled that he envisioned Tollås would be made the first choice for center back, pairing up with Daniel Arnefjord. Both Rekdal and Arnefjord praised the youngster as a talent, and claimed he had even greater potential. Despite plenty of playing time, the season however turned out to be mixed for Tollås, an injury kept him on the sidelines for most of the summer, and he was jeered by frustrated home supporters during a home draw against Sandefjord Fotball. Despite this, he was selected to start the 2009 Norwegian Cup final which Aafk brought home for the first time.

The following season looked more promising for the young defender. Tollås himself hoped to be selected as first choice for the starting eleven for the entire season, as he admitted that the previous season had been "disappointing" for his part. Coach Rekdal stated that Tollås needed to be more "daring" and "concentrated" for him to succeed. After subjecting himself to a regime of strenuous physical exercise, Tollås delivered a stable performance in the season where Aafk finished at a record 4th place in the league.

Tollås was made second choice for central defence throughout the first half of the 2011-season, most of the times with Daniel Arnefjord. His break came during the europa league match against AZ when he replaced Ville Jalasto who had until then been favored over him. the match was a disaster for AaFK, who were thrashed 7–1 on aggregate. The second half of the season proved successful for Tollås, starting with the match against Sogndal Fotball, AaFK and Tollås kept a clean sheet for five consecutive games. The marked improvement in Tollås' gameplay earned him a new contract with the club, lasting out the 2014 season. Like the 2009 season, AaFK made it all the way to the Norwegian Cup Final. This time facing SK Brann and just like in 2009, Tollås played the entire match, bringing the gold home to Aalesund for the second time. His decent play during the 2011-season paid off for him by being selected to the Under-23 national team together with teammate Fredrik Ulvestad. The 2012 season saw Tollås achieve the feat of being first choice for full back. Sports commentators as well as the coach praised Tollås for finally stepping up and "cracking the code".

== International career ==
Tollås was first capped for Norway when he played for the under-17 team in 2007. He has later represented Norway at under-18, under-19 and under-21 level.

== Career statistics ==
As of 22 October 2022

Club	Season	League			Cup		Continental (Note: All appearances in the UEFA Europa League)		Other		Total	
Club	Season	Division	Apps	Goals	Apps	Goals	Apps	Goals	Apps	Goals	Apps	Goals
Aalesund	2007	Tippeligaen	0	0	1	0	–		–		1	0
Aalesund	2008	Tippeligaen	17	0	3	0	–		2 (Note: Appearances in the Tippeligaen relegation playoffs)	0	22	0
Aalesund	2009	Tippeligaen	21	0	3	0	–		–		24	0
Aalesund	2010	Tippeligaen	17	0	2	0	1	0	1 (Note: Appearance in the Mesterfinalen)	0	21	0
Aalesund	2011	Tippeligaen	17	0	6	0	6	0	–		29	0
Aalesund	2012	Tippeligaen	29	3	3	1	4	1	1	0	37	5
Aalesund	2013	Tippeligaen	30	0	3	1	–		–		33	1
Aalesund	2014	Tippeligaen	12	1	3	0	–		–		15	1
Aalesund	Total		143	4	24	2	11	1	4	0	182	7
Vålerenga	2015	Tippeligaen	21	0	0	0	–		–		21	0
Vålerenga	2016	Tippeligaen	11	2	1	0	–		–		12	2
Vålerenga	2017	Eliteserien	29	3	6	0	–		–		35	3
Vålerenga	2018	Eliteserien	28	2	4	0	–		–		32	2
Vålerenga	2019	Eliteserien	10	0	2	0	–		–		12	0
Vålerenga	2020	Eliteserien	23	0	0	0	–		–		23	0
Vålerenga	2021	Eliteserien	28	3	3	0	2	0	–		33	3
Vålerenga	2022	Eliteserien	24	1	2	0	–		–		26	1
Vålerenga	Total		174	11	18	0	2	0	0	0	185	11
Career total			317	15	40	2	13	1	4	0	376	18

== Honours ==
=== Club ===
Aalesund

- Norwegian Football Cup: 2009, 2011

== Personal life ==
A notorious prankster, Tollås is well known for playing practical jokes on his teammates. In September 2011, he was a "suspect" when the car of reserve-goalkeeper Ole-Christian Rørvik was found covered in Post-it Notes. Tollås however, while applauding the initiative, denied having pulled the prank. In another incident, Tollås secretly snapped a close-up photo of an unidentified naked teammate in the locker room. Tollås then proceeded to post the image on Twitter, which caused some controversy. After being reprimanded by the club, Tollås jokingly responded to the controversy by stating that his goal was to upload one new nude photo "every day".
