= Edvard Skagestad =

Norwegian footballer (born 1988)

Personal information
- Full name: Edvard Skagestad
- Date of birth: 6 July 1988 (age 38)
- Height: 1.86 m (6 ft 1 in)
- Position: Centre back

Team information
- Current team: Follo
- Number: 6

Youth career
- Ås IL

Senior career*
Years	Team	Apps	(Gls)
2006–2010	Follo		
2011–2013	Aalesund	69	(1)
2014	IFK Norrköping	18	(2)
2015–2016	Aalesund	47	(2)
2017	Fredrikstad	14	(0)
2018–2020	Kongsvinger	79	(1)
2021	Ås	10	(0)
2022–	Follo	12	(0)

International career
2006	Norway U-18	2	(0)
- * Club domestic league appearances and goals as of 12:57, 14 November 2022 (UTC)

Edvard Skagestad (born 6 July 1988) is a Norwegian footballer who plays as a centre back for Follo. Skagestad played five seasons for Aalesund in Eliteserien and one season for IFK Norrköping in Allsvenskan. He has represented Norway at youth international level.

== Early life ==
Born and raised in Ås, Akershus. Skagestad was involved in athletics while attending senior high school. He initially played Basketball, and did not start focusing on football until around the age of 18. He describes himself as a moderate supporter of Arsenal FC.

== Club career ==
Starting his youth career in his community, Skagestad previously played for Ås IL. Skagestad later played for local club Follo from 2006 to 2010, and he played the cup final against Strømsgodset in 2010, which Follo lost 2–0.

He joined Aalesund ahead of the 2011-season as a free agent. He immediately stated that his goal for the season was to play for a permanent spot. After making a series of good performances in the 2011 pre-season, Skagestad suffered a bout of hamstring-injuries which kept him on the sidelines until late April. He made his debut in the cup-win against Stranda, and his first league debut came later on 29 May in the 2–0 home win against Viking. He was again injured in the 4–0 win over IF Elfsborg but quickly recovered.

During the last half of the 2011 season there was an acute shortage of qualified strikers in Aalesund's squad. Skagestad, who originally was a right back, was then forced to play as a striker and occasionally as a winger. He went on to receive praise for his performance At one point, Skagestad made the starting-eleven as a striker while the actual strikers Sander Post, Didrik Fløtre and Solomon Okoronkwo was referred to the bench. His first goal for the club came on 30 October in a 1–1 away draw against Lillestrøm. The 2011 season ended triumphantly for Skagestad as he was chosen to start, again as a striker, the 2011 Cup final against Brann. A match which Aalesund won 2–1.

In the run-up to the 2012 season, Skagestad was again chosen as a striker, this time due to rampant injuries suffered by Leke James, Demar Phillips and Lars Fuhre. He answered by actively part-taking in defeating Dutch powerhouse FC Twente in the Maspalomas Cup. His strong performances in the pre-season as a striker earned him a starting spot throughout the first half of the season, which again made him target of the local media, who were frustrated by the club's inability to produce an actual striker. Despite being brought to the club as a center back, Skagestad ended up playing most of the matches as a striker. After the home loss against rivals Molde on 6 May, Aalesund's head coach Kjetil Rekdal were facing outside pressure and slowly started utilizing Skagestad as a full back, replacing him as a forward with the Jamaican newcomer Tremaine Stewart. By mid-season however, Skagestad found himself playing midfielder, once again due to injuries devastating the squad. Commentators noted that the full-back had essentially played in every single position except as goalkeeper after arriving at the club.

Skagestad played for Aalesund for three seasons, and played 28 matches when the team finished fourth in the 2013 Tippeligaen, which was his last season. On 29 November 2013 he was presented as a new signing for the Swedish club IFK Norrköping, and he joined the club in January 2014.

== Career statistics ==
As of match played 23 October 2022

Season	Club	Division	League		Cup		Total	
Season	Club	Division	Apps	Goals	Apps	Goals	Apps	Goals
2006	Follo	1. divisjon	3	0	?	?	3	0
2007	Follo	2. divisjon	?	?	?	?	?	?
2008	Follo	2. divisjon	?	?	?	?	?	?
2009	Follo	2. divisjon	?	?	?	?	?	?
2010	Follo	1. divisjon	25	0	7	0	32	0
2011	Aalesund	Eliteserien	17	1	5	0	22	1
2012	Aalesund	Eliteserien	24	0	1	0	25	0
2013	Aalesund	Eliteserien	28	0	3	0	31	0
2014	Norrköping	Allsvenskan	18	2	0	0	18	2
2015	Aalesund	Eliteserien	23	0	2	0	25	0
2016	Aalesund	Eliteserien	24	2	2	0	26	2
2017	Fredrikstad	1. divisjon	14	0	1	0	15	0
2018	Kongsvinger	1. divisjon	25	0	0	0	25	0
2019	Kongsvinger	1. divisjon	28	0	1	0	29	0
2020	Kongsvinger	1. divisjon	26	1	—		26	1
2021	Ås	4. divisjon	10	0	0	0	10	0
2022	Follo	3. divisjon	12	0	0	0	12	0
Career total			277	6	22	0	299	5
