= Color Line Stadion =

Football stadium in Ålesund, Norway

Coordinates: 62°28′11″N 6°11′14″E

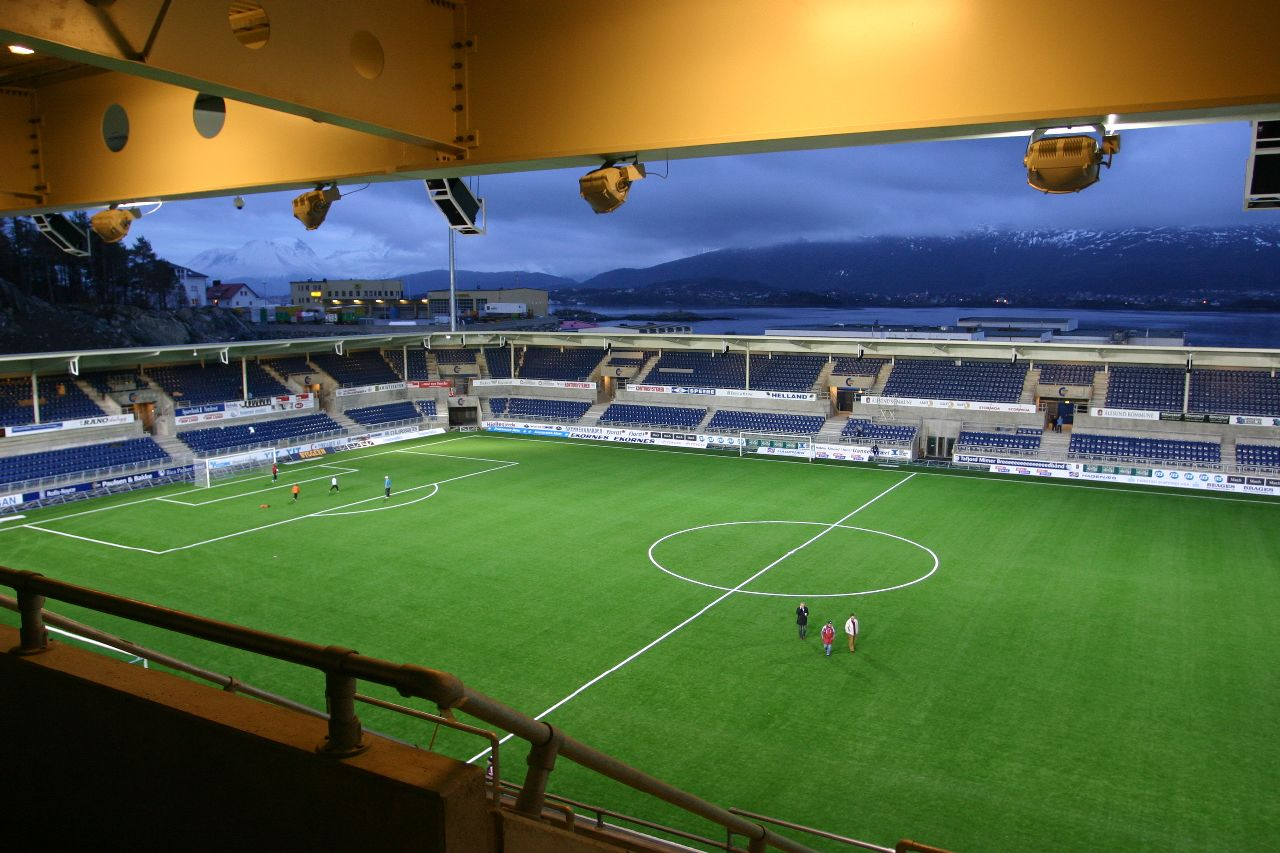
- Interactive map of Color Line Stadion
- Location: Ålesund, Norway
- Owner: Aalesunds FK
- Operator: Aalesunds FK
- Capacity: 10,778 (Football)
- Surface: Artificial turf

Construction
- Opened: 16 April 2005
- Cost: NOK 160 million

Tenants
- Aalesunds FK (2005–); FK Fortuna Ålesund (2009–)

Color Line Stadion is an association football stadium in Ålesund, Norway, and the home of Aalesunds FK. It was inaugurated in April 2005 and cost NOK 160 million to build. It is referred to as Aalesund Stadion by UEFA, as commercial naming rights arrangements, in this case, with ferry operator Color Line, are not used during UEFA competitions.

It was the first top-level stadium in Norway to feature artificial turf, which was at the time a highly debated issue. When Aalesund opened the stadium, businessman Olav Nils Sunde donated a statue to the club, which was erected in front of the stadium. Whilst Sunde denied it, the statue bore a very strong resemblance to former Aalesund player John Arne Riise. In 2007, when Riise played in the Champions League Final, a Norwegian commentator demanded the statue officially carry his name. Riise himself has said, "[The name change] is not for me to decide. Everyone sees who it is, and I know that it was made for me." It was officially named "John Arne Riise" in April 2018.

Since 2009 it has also hosted the home games of the women's Toppserien side Fortuna Ålesund. The venue has hosted one Norway national under-21 football team match, playing 1–3 against Cyprus on 3 September 2010. In a 2012 survey carried out by the Norwegian Players' Association among away-team captains, Color Line Stadion was ranked eleventh amongst league stadiums, with a score of 2.87 on a scale from one to five.

== Ownership and finances ==
The stadium was originally owned by Ålesund Stadion KS, a company with several local business owners. Its major owners included Color Line, O.N. Sunde Eiendom, Sparebanken Møre and Tafjord Kraft AS. Color Line AS holds the naming rights to the venue.

In 2025, the stadium company announced that Ålesund Stadion KS was being wound up and that the business would continue as Ålesund Stadion AS. Ålesund Stadion KS was deleted from the Norwegian company register in November 2025.

In 2007, Aftenposten reported that Aalesunds FK leased the stadium from Ålesund Stadion KS under an agreement consisting of a fixed payment and 20 per cent of ticket revenue. The club's managing director said that annual rent could exceed NOK 10 million when the stadium was full. He also stated that the club's sponsorship revenue had quadrupled and its ticket revenue had more than doubled after the move from Kråmyra Stadion.

== Facts ==
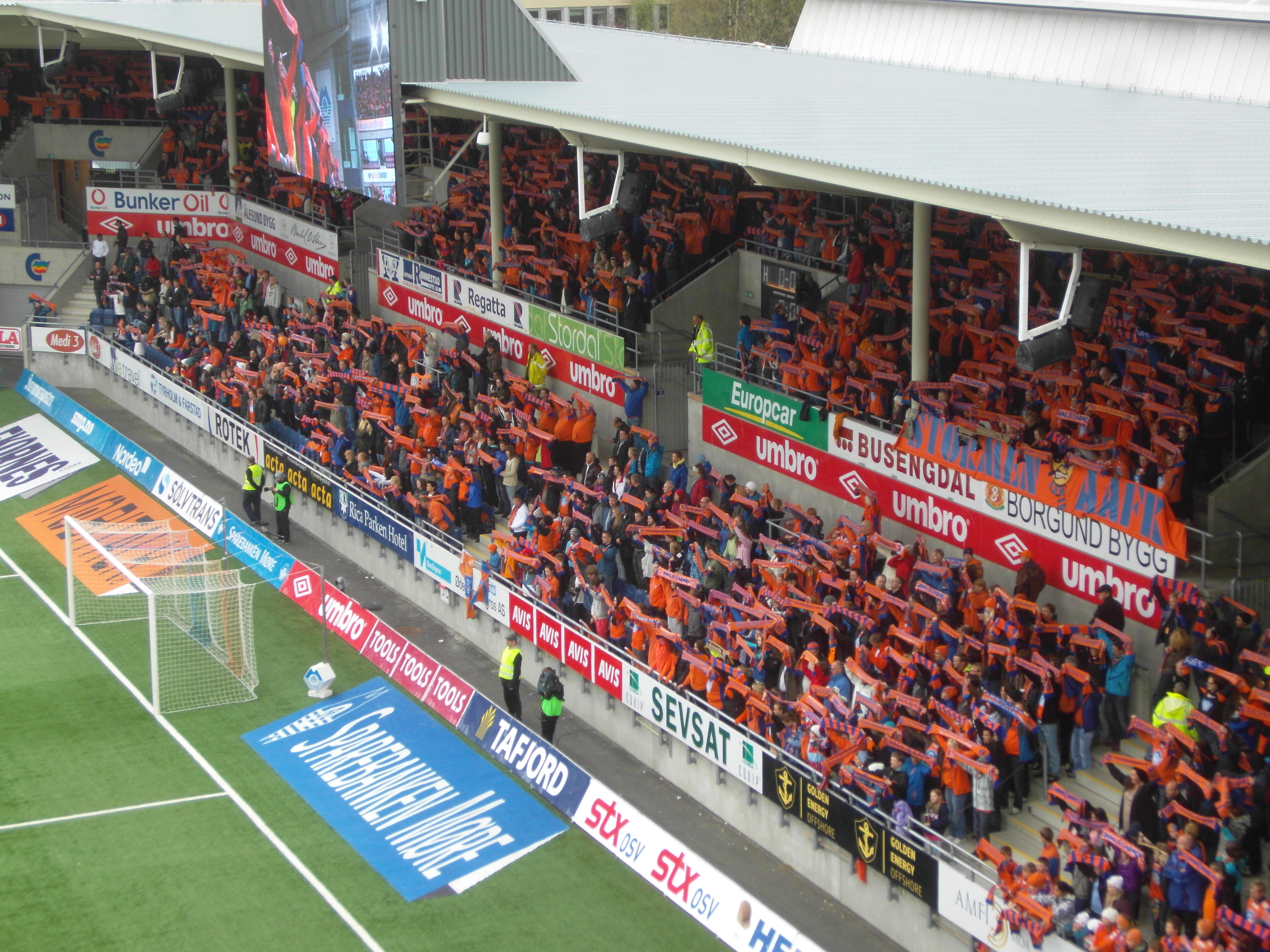
Stormen Supporters

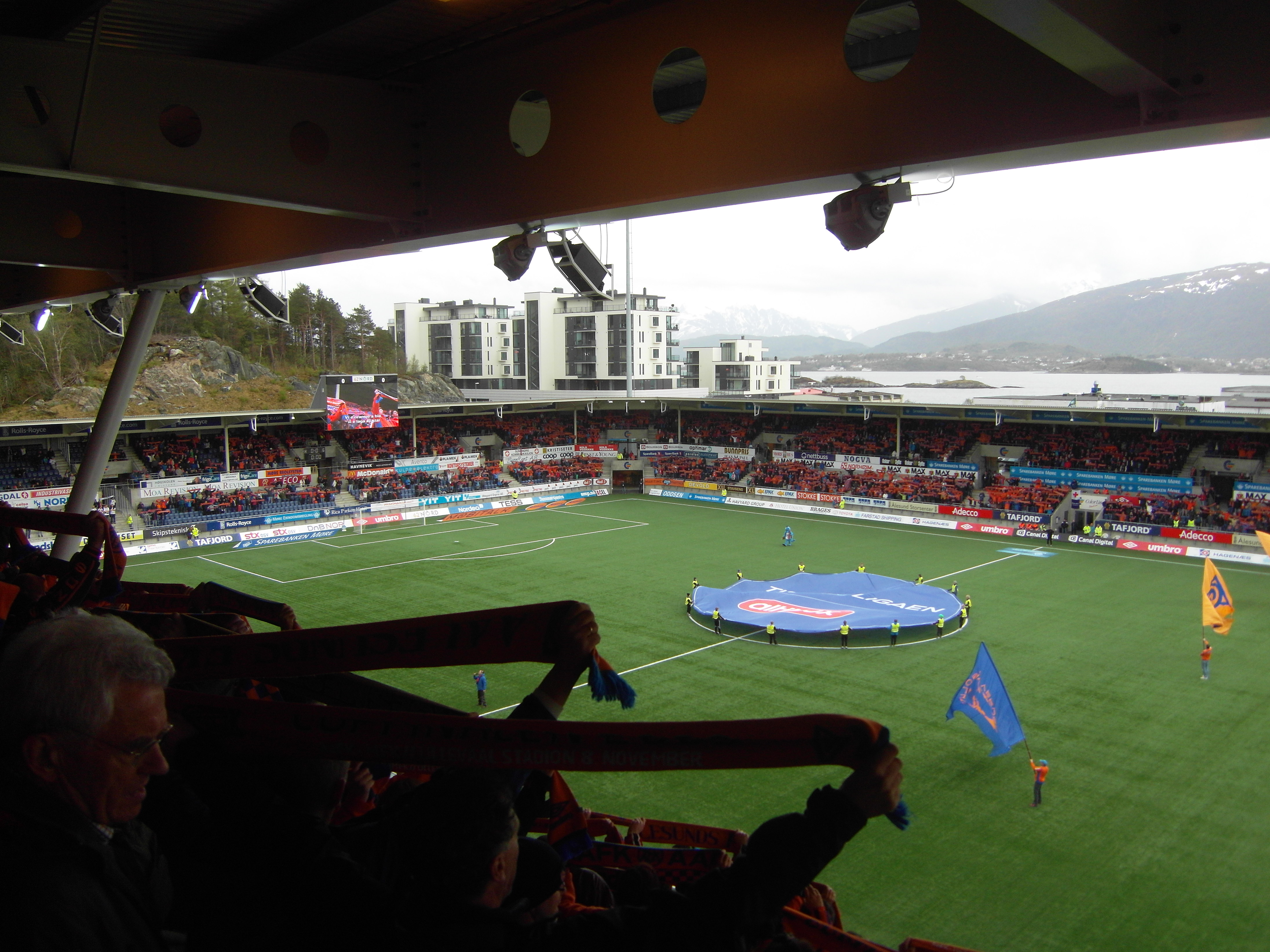
South East Stand

- Capacity: 10,778 (9,598 seated).
- Record attendance: 10,903 (vs Hamarkameratene, 2005).
- The first match Aafk played on Color Line Stadium was against Odd Grenland. Aalesund won the match.
- Outside the stadium is a statue of John Arne Riise, modeled after the former Aalesund player. Until April 2018, the statue was named «The football player».

== Attendance ==
	Eliteserien
†	Norwegian First Division

Attendance
Season	Avg	Min	Max	Rank	Ref
2005	10,618	10,370	10,903	5	
2006	9,950	9,028	10,771	1†	
2007	10,475	9,680	10,780	7	
2008	10,363	9,724	10,778	6	
2009	10,218	9,409	10,778	6	
2010	10,146	9,500	10,778	5	
2011	9,565	8,783	10,677	5	
2012	9,183	8,324	10,247	6	
2013	8,192	6,925	10,101	6	
2014	7,602	6,580	9,386	6	
2015	6,696	5,655	8,287	7	
2016	6,370	5,215	10,013	8	
2017	6,062	5,178	9,062	8	
2018	4,812	4,362	5,524	2†	
2019	4,099	3,465	5,495	2†	
