= Leke James =

Nigerian footballer

Personal information
- Full name: Leke Samson James
- Date of birth: 1 November 1992 (age 34)
- Place of birth: Kaduna, Nigeria
- Height: 1.88 m (6 ft 2 in)
- Position: Forward

Senior career*
Years	Team	Apps	(Gls)
2009–2011	Bridge Boys	45	(39)
2012–2015	Aalesund	90	(37)
2016–2017	Beijing Enterprises Group	26	(13)
2018–2020	Molde	59	(33)
2021	Al Qadsiah	10	(2)
2021–2023	Sivasspor	26	(5)
Total		256	(129)
- * Club domestic league appearances and goals as of 6 June 2023

Leke Samson James (born 1 November 1992) is a Nigerian professional footballer who plays as a forward.

== Club career ==
=== Early career ===
He started out his career in his native homeland playing for Bridge Boys.

=== Aalesund ===
He transferred to Aalesund on 6 January 2012.

An injury obtained during pre-season hindered his path into the first team and he did not get back into full training until the start of July. On 26 July 2012 he made his first appearance for Aalesund coming on as a substitute at the start of the second half of the game versus Tirana in Europe League scoring twice in Aalesund's 5–0 win. On 29 July 2012 he made his debut in Tippeligaen and also started his first match, against Stabæk.

=== Beijing Enterprises Group ===
Between 2016 and 2017 he played for Chinese club Beijing Enterprises Group in China League One.

=== Molde ===
On 30 April 2018, Molde FK announced the signing of James on a three-year contract. He got his Molde debut on 26 July 2018 when he came on as a 67th minute substitute in Molde's 3–0 win against Laçi in the 2018–19 UEFA Europa League second qualifying round. James scored Molde's third goal in the game. On 22 June 2019, James scored a perfect hat-trick in the first half in Molde's 4–0 away win against Strømsgodset. He scored with his right foot, left foot and his head and completed his hat-trick in 13 minutes and 45 seconds. On 11 July 2019, James scored his second hat-trick for the club, his first in UEFA competitions, in Molde's 7–1 win over KR in the UEFA Europa League first qualifying round. James scored a brace in Molde's 4–0 win against Strømsgodset on Aker Stadion. He scored the third and fourth goal of the game that secured Molde their fourth league title, his first. James finished the 2019 season scoring 24 goals in 38 matches in all competitions.

=== Sivasspor ===
After a short spell in the Saudi Pro League, James joined Süper Lig club Sivasspor on a two-year on 14 July 2021.

On 30 December 2021, James scored two goals in Sivasspor's 2–1 win over MKE Ankaragücü in the fifth round of the Turkish Cup. Sivasspor would eventually defeat Kayserispor in the final to secure the club its first major honour.

== Career statistics ==
=== Club ===
As of match played 6 June 2023

Appearances and goals by club, season and competition
Club	Season	League			National cup (Note: Includes Norwegian Cup, Chinese FA Cup, King Cup, Turkish Cup)		Continental		Other		Total	
Club	Season	Division	Apps	Goals	Apps	Goals	Apps	Goals	Apps	Goals	Apps	Goals
Aalesund	2012	Tippeligaen	12	4	0	0	3 (Note: Appearances in UEFA Europa League)	2	—		15	6
Aalesund	2013	Tippeligaen	26	10	2	3	—		—		28	13
Aalesund	2014	Tippeligaen	23	10	3	1	—		—		26	11
Aalesund	2015	Tippeligaen	29	13	3	2	—		—		32	15
Aalesund	Total		90	37	8	6	3	2	—		101	45
Beijing Enterprises Group	2016	China League One	24	13	1	0	—		—		25	13
Beijing Enterprises Group	2017	China League One	2	0	0	0	—		—		2	0
Beijing Enterprises Group	Total		26	13	1	0	—		—		27	13
Molde	2018	Eliteserien	9	3	0	0	5	1	—		14	4
Molde	2019	Eliteserien	28	17	2	3	8	4	—		38	24
Molde	2020	Eliteserien	22	13	–		9 (Note: Four appearances and two goals in UEFA Champions League, five appearances in UEFA Europa League)	2	—		31	15
Molde	Total		59	33	2	3	23	7	—		83	43
Al Qadsiah	2020–21	Saudi Pro League	10	2	1	0	—		—		11	2
Sivasspor	2021–22	Süper Lig	12	2	1	2	6 (Note: Appearances in UEFA Europa Conference League)	2	—		19	6
Sivasspor	2022–23	Süper Lig	14	3	1	0	5 (Note: Two appearances and one goal in UEFA Europa League, three appearances in UEFA Europa Conference League)	1	1 (Note: Appearance in Turkish Super Cup)	0	21	4
Sivasspor	Total		26	5	2	2	11	3	1	0	40	10
Career total			211	90	14	11	36	12	1	0	262	113

== Honours ==
Molde

- Eliteserien: 2019

Sivasspor

- Turkish Cup: 2021–22
