= Thomas Martinussen =

Norwegian footballer (born 1995)

Personal information
- Full name: Thomas Skog Martinussen
- Date of birth: 5 February 1995 (age 31)
- Place of birth: Ålesund, Norway
- Height: 1.78 m (5 ft 10 in)
- Position: Midfielder

Team information
- Current team: Ullern IF

Youth career
- Langevåg
- Fiskarstrand

Senior career*
Years	Team	Apps	(Gls)
2012–2016	Aalesund	28	(0)
2016–2019	Brattvåg	65	(4)
2019–	Ullern	21	(4)

International career^{‡}
2013	Norway U18	1	(0)
2014	Norway U19	1	(0)
- * Club domestic league appearances and goals as of 1 November 2021 ‡ National team caps and goals as of 1 November 2021

Thomas Skog Martinussen (born 5 February 1995) is a Norwegian football midfielder who plays for Ullern IF in the 3. divisjon.

He played several seasons for Aalesund in Tippeligaen, but never really broke into the first team, and joined third-tier club Brattvåg IL in the summer of 2016.

== Career statistics ==
Season	Club	League	League		Cup		Continental		Total	
Season	Club	League	Apps	Goals	Apps	Goals	Apps	Goals	Apps	Goals
2012	Aalesund	Eliteserien	3	0	0	0	-		3	0
2013	Aalesund	Eliteserien	16	0	1	1	-		17	1
2014	Aalesund	Eliteserien	3	0	1	0	-		4	0
2015	Aalesund	Eliteserien	5	0	2	0	-		7	0
2016	Aalesund	Eliteserien	1	0	2	0	-		3	0
Career Total			28	0	6	1	0	0	34	1
