= Christian Myklebust =

Norwegian footballer (born 1992)

Personal information
- Full name: Christian Rønstad Myklebust
- Date of birth: 11 March 1992 (age 34)
- Place of birth: Ålesund, Norway
- Height: 1.84 m (6 ft 1/2 in)
- Position: Winger

Youth career
- –2008: Skedsmo
- 2009: Lillestrøm
- 2010: Aalesund

Senior career*
Years	Team	Apps	(Gls)
2011–2014	Aalesund	43	(1)
2016	Emblem	5	(0)
2017–2018	NHH		
- * Club domestic league appearances and goals

Christian Myklebust (born 11 March 1992) is a retired Norwegian footballer who played for Aalesunds FK.

He played youth football for Skedsmo FK before joining Lillestrøm SK's recruit setup in 2009. In 2010 he joined Aalesunds FK, made his debut in a 2010 Norwegian Football Cup match and scored a goal.

After four more seasons in Aalesund his career was put to an indefinite halt owing to injuries. He made a brief comeback for minnows Emblem IL in 2016. He went on to study at the Norwegian School of Economics in Bergen and play for the school's competitive fifth-tier team NHH FK.

== Career statistics ==
Season	Club	Division	League		Cup		Total	
Season	Club	Division	Apps	Goals	Apps	Goals	Apps	Goals
2010	Aalesund	Tippeligaen	0	0	1	1	1	1
2011	Aalesund	Tippeligaen	18	1	3	1	21	2
2012	Aalesund	Tippeligaen	12	0	2	0	14	0
2013	Aalesund	Tippeligaen	13	0	3	1	16	1
2014	Aalesund	Tippeligaen	0	0	0	0	0	0
Career Total			43	1	9	3	52	4
