= Ole-Christian Rørvik =

Norwegian footballer (born 1989)

Personal information
- Full name: Ole-Christian Rørvik
- Date of birth: 21 February 1989 (age 37)
- Place of birth: Ålesund, Norway
- Height: 1.93 m (6 ft 4 in)
- Position: Goalkeeper

Senior career*
Years	Team	Apps	(Gls)
–2010	Skarbøvik	?	(?)
2011–2012	Aalesund	1	(0)
- * Club domestic league appearances and goals as of 30 June 2012

Ole-Christian Rørvik (born 21 February 1989) is a Norwegian football goalkeeper who plays for Aalesund in Tippeligaen.

== Club career ==
Prior to moving to Aalesund in 2011, Rørvik played for Skarbøvik in the Norwegian Second Division. He was the team's captain and considered one of the biggest talents in the third tier. Originally he was brought to Aalesund as the backup goalkeeper, but an injury prior to the 2011 season ruled this out. Instead Aalesund signed Jonas Sandqvist on a short-term deal.

He made his debut for Aalesund coming on as a substitute in the 89th minute against Brann on 27 November 2011 in the last round of the 2011 season. He made his first starting appearance on 1 May 2012 against Herd, in the Norwegian Cup.

== Career statistics ==
Club performance			League		Cup		Continental		Total	
Season	Club	League	Apps	Goals	Apps	Goals	Apps	Goals	Apps	Goals
2011	Aalesund	Tippeligaen	1	0	0	0	-		1	0
2012	Aalesund	Tippeligaen	0	0	3	0	-		3	0
Career Total			1	0	3	0	0	0	4	0
