= Michael Barrantes =

Costa Rican footballer (born 1983)

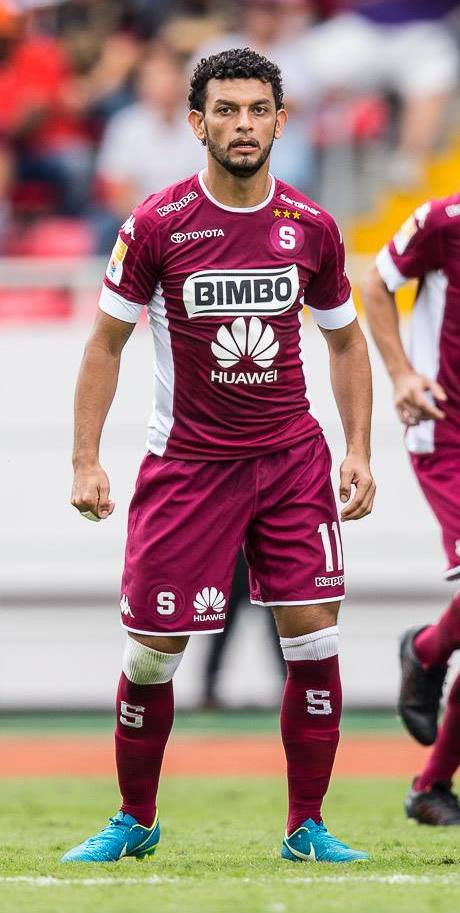
- Barrantes playing for Saprissa in 2018

Personal information
- Full name: Michael Barrantes Rojas
- Date of birth: 4 October 1983 (age 43)
- Place of birth: San José, Costa Rica
- Height: 1.77 m (5 ft 10 in)
- Position: Midfielder

Youth career
- 2004: Ramonense

Senior career*
Years	Team	Apps	(Gls)
2004	Ramonense	11	(2)
2004–2005	Belén	19	(5)
2005–2007	Puntarenas	49	(1)
2007–2010	Deportivo Saprissa	90	(7)
2010	→ Aalesund (loan)	7	(2)
2011–2015	Aalesund	115	(31)
2015	Shanghai Shenxin	13	(4)
2016	Wuhan Zall	26	(4)
2017	Cartaginés	12	(0)
2017	Grecia	19	(4)
2018–2021	Saprissa	143	(14)
2022–2023	Cartaginés	7	(4)
2023–2024	Alajuelense	40	(4)
2024	Puntarenas	14	(3)
2025	Santa Ana	10	(0)

International career
2007–2015	Costa Rica	54	(4)
- * Club domestic league appearances and goals as of 07:31, 28 May 2021 (UTC)

Michael Barrantes Rojas (Spanish pronunciation: [baˈrantes]; born 4 October 1983) is a Costa Rican former professional footballer who played as a midfielder.

On 6 November 2011, he scored two goals for Aalesund in the 2011 Norwegian Cup Final, in a 2–1 win against Brann, and was awarded the man of the match award. He won the Kniksen award as the best midfielder in the 2011 Tippeligaen.

== Career ==
=== Club career ===
==== Deportivo Saprissa ====
Barrantes started his professional career with his native side A.D. Belén in 2003. Barrantes later joined the Costa Rican side Deportivo Saprissa after first playing two seasons for Puntarenas F.C. in 2007, much to the disappointment of Puntarenas fans. The following season he secured for his team the 2008 league title when he scored the winning goal in the last playoff match against LD Alajuelense. In May the following season he sustained a left knee injury that left him out for eight weeks.

==== Aalesunds FK ====
In July 2010, after delivering an impressive display during Saprissa's European tour, he was signed by Norwegian side Aalesunds FK on loan, joining his compatriot Pablo Herrera who was already at the club. After some initial hurdles with the paperwork, Barrantes quickly became a favorite both with the players and coaching staff. He received his starting debut with Aalesunds on 12 September in an away loss against Odd Grenland, during which he caused a penalty 50 seconds into the match. And it became evident that the midfielder needed time to adjust to the European style of playing. The following season proved to be much more successful for Barrantes, as his game play not only saw him become the center piece of the Aalesunds midfield, the club also decided to make the loan-spell permanent, six months ahead of time.

In the run-up to the 2011 season, Barrantes' qualities on the pitch was praised by both commentators and coaches such as Ole Gunnar Solskjær. The high expectations were matched by at times very good performances. He was credited with orchestrating the 2–3 away win against IK Start, as well as the 2–0 home win against Viking FK, where he netted the final goal. He was subsequently named Man of the match in the next four consecutive AaFK matches, and the local newspaper Sunnmørsposten crowned him King of the midfield. Despite a mid-table position for Aalesunds, Barrantes helped the team advance to the playoffs at the Europa league qualifiers. In addition he crowned the season with winning the domestic cup when Aalesunds beat SK Brann 2–1 in the finals, with Barrantes scoring twice and securing the title. At the end of the season, he was given the award "Midfielder of the year" by Norsk Toppfotball, despite speaking neither Norwegian nor English.

In the following 2012 season, despite being watched closely by a number of clubs, Barrantes remained in Aalesunds. With his opponents now familiar with his style of play, it proved to be much harder for him to dominate than in the previous season. Much to his frustration, the season turned out to be mixed for the team. However, on 13 May, he was made awarded the Captaincy for the first time, in the 3–1 home win against Strømsgodset IF. A week later, in a repeat scenario of the cup-final, Barrantes scored again against SK Brann to secure a 2–0 home win. On 15 July he again scored two goals in the home win against Fredrikstad FK, the match Barrantes claimed, was his best match that year. He repeated the feat in the away win against Fredrikstad a month later with an impressive left-foot goal from 30 meters, and again in the home win against Vålerenga Fotball with two goals on 21 October. In October with the season coming to an end, the club revealed that Barrantes had in fact been struggling with a pelvic injury throughout much of the 2012 season that kept him out of the pre-season, and that was the main reason behind his mixed success. However the club stated that when he is 100% well, he will again be the able to dominate the midfield.

==== Shanghai Shenxin ====
In June 2015, Barrantes signed for Shanghai Shenxin.

==== Wuhan Zall ====
On 15 January 2016, Barrantes transferred to China League One side Wuhan Zall.

=== International career ===
Barrantes made his debut for Costa Rica in a February 2007 friendly match against Trinidad and Tobago and went on to earn 54 caps, scoring four goals. He represented his country in fourteen FIFA World Cup qualification matches and played at the 2007 UNCAF Nations Cup as well as the 2007 and 2013 CONCACAF Gold Cups.

== Career statistics ==
=== Club ===
As of match played 20 October 2024

Appearances and goals by club, season and competition
Club	Season	League			National cup		Continental		Other		Total	
Club	Season	Division	Apps	Goals	Apps	Goals	Apps	Goals	Apps	Goals	Apps	Goals
Ramonense	2003–04	Liga FPD	11	2	—		—		—		11	2
Belén	2004–05	Liga FPD	19	5	—		—		—		19	5
Puntarenas	2005–06	Liga FPD	17	0	—		—		—		17	0
Puntarenas	2006–07	Liga FPD	32	1	—		7	0	—		39	1
Puntarenas	Total		49	1	—		7	0	—		56	1
Saprissa	2007–08	Liga FPD	29	2	—		14	0	—		43	2
Saprissa	2008–09	Liga FPD	33	2	—		4	0	—		37	2
Saprissa	2009–10	Liga FPD	28	3	—		6	0	—		34	3
Saprissa	Total		90	7	—		24	0	—		114	7
Aalesund (loan)	2010	Tippeligaen	7	2	0	0	—		—		7	2
Aalesund	2011	Tippeligaen	29	6	7	6	7	5	—		43	17
Aalesund	2012	Tippeligaen	28	9	3	0	2	1	—		33	10
Aalesund	2013	Tippeligaen	26	7	3	0	—		—		29	7
Aalesund	2014	Tippeligaen	20	6	2	2	—		—		22	8
Aalesund	2015	Tippeligaen	12	3	1	0	—		—		13	3
Aalesund	Total		122	33	16	8	9	6	—		147	47
Shanghai Shenxin	2015	Chinese Super League	13	4	—		—		—		13	4
Wuhan Zall	2016	China League One	26	4	0	0	—		—		26	4
Cartaginés	2016–17	Liga FPD	12	0	—		—		—		12	0
Grecia	2017–18	Liga FPD	19	4	—		—		—		19	4
Saprissa	2017–18	Liga FPD	25	3	—		2	0	—		27	3
Saprissa	2018–19	Liga FPD	46	5	—		2	0	—		48	5
Saprissa	2019–20	Liga FPD	35	2	—		9	1	—		44	3
Saprissa	2020–21	Liga FPD	38	4	—		4	0	—		42	4
Saprissa	2021–22	Liga FPD	24	3	—		5	1	1	0	30	4
Saprissa	Total		168	17	—		22	2	1	0	191	19
Cartaginés	2021–22	Liga FPD	23	0	—		2	0	1	0	26	0
Cartaginés	2022–23	Liga FPD	28	6	—		—		—		28	6
Cartaginés	Total		51	6	—		2	0	1	0	54	6
Alajuelense	2023–24	Liga FPD	46	4	—		10	3	—		56	7
Puntarenas	2024–25	Liga FPD	14	3	—		—		—		14	3
Career Total			640	90	16	8	74	11	2	0	732	109

=== International goals ===
Score and result lists Costa Rica's goals first.

No.	Date	Venue	Opponent	Score	Result	Competition
1	26 January 2010	Estadio Ingeniero Hilario Sánchez, San Juan, Argentina	Argentina	1–1	2–3	Friendly
2	3 September 2010	Estadio Rommel Fernández, Panama City, Panama	Panama	1–0	2–2	Friendly
3	9 July 2013	Jeld-Wen Field, Portland, United States	Cuba	1–0	3–0	2013 CONCACAF Gold Cup
4	9 July 2013	Jeld-Wen Field, Portland, United States	Cuba	3–0	3–0	2013 CONCACAF Gold Cup

== Personal life ==
Barrantes lives with his wife, Andrea in Ålesund. In August 2012, they announced that they were expecting their first child. The child, a baby boy named Arjen (after Dutch winger Arjen Robben), was born in February 2013 in Ålesund.

== Honours ==
=== Club ===
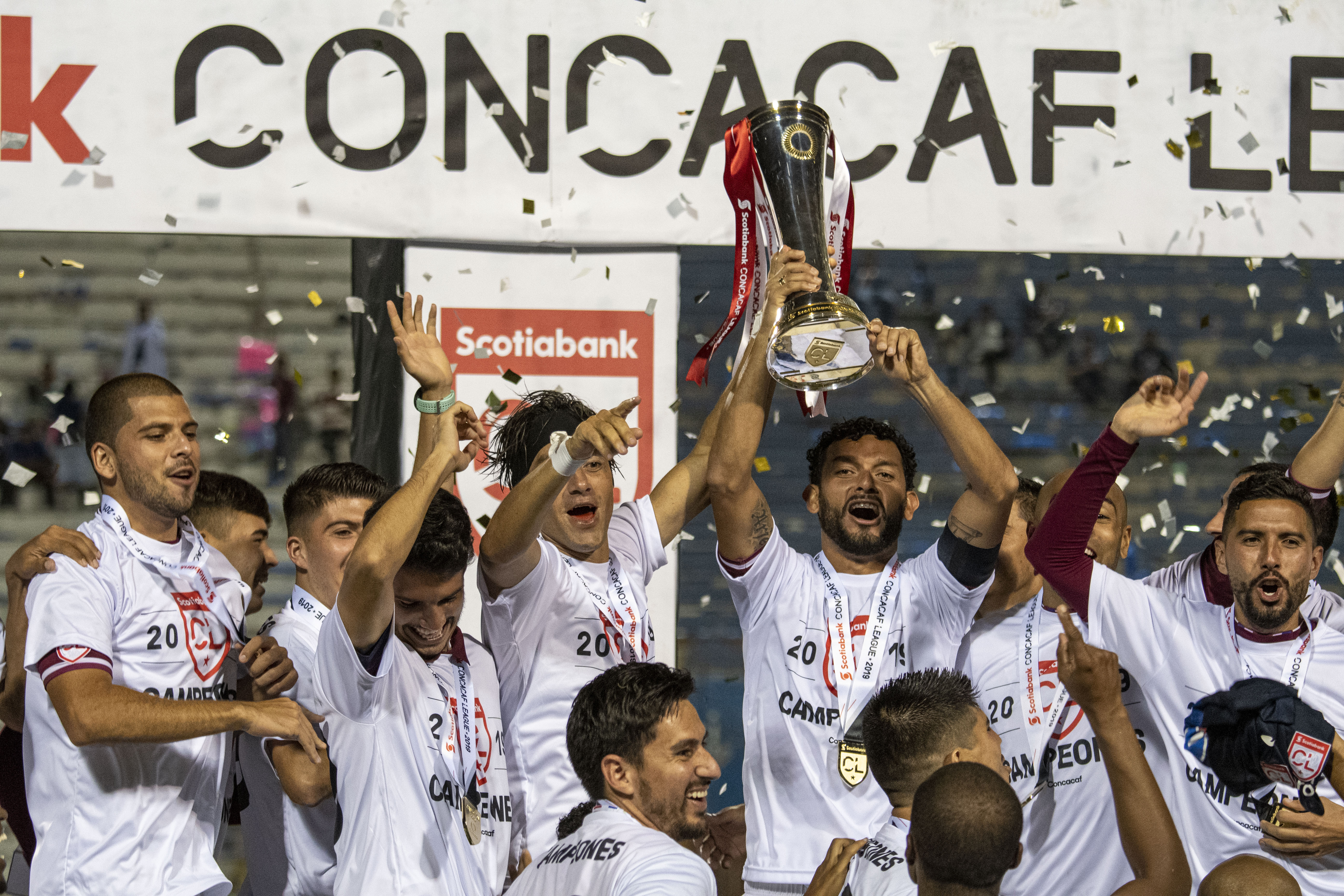
Barrantes lifting the 2019 CONCACAF League trophy

Saprissa

- Liga FPD: Apertura 2008, Clausura 2010, Clausura 2018, Clausura 2020, Clausura 2021
- CONCACAF League: 2019

Aalesund

- Norwegian Football Cup (1): 2011

=== International ===
Costa Rica

- Copa Centroamericana: 2007

=== Individual ===
- Norwegian Midfielder of the Year (1): 2011
