= Tremaine Stewart =

Jamaican footballer (1988–2021)

- Stewart in 2012 with the Jamaica national football team

Personal information
- Full name: Tremaine Stewart
- Date of birth: 5 January 1988
- Place of birth: Kingston, Jamaica
- Date of death: 18 April 2021 (aged 33)
- Place of death: Spanish Town, Jamaica
- Height: 1.72 m (5 ft 8 in)
- Positions: Forward; winger

Senior career*
Years	Team	Apps	(Gls)
2006–2008	August Town		
2008–2012	Portmore United		
2012–2014	Aalesund	34	(6)
2014–2015	Waterhouse	18	(9)
2015	RoPS	4	(0)
2016–2017	Portmore United	30	(6)
2017–2020	Waterhouse	78	(10)
2020–2021	Dunbeholden	0	(0)

International career
2012–2013	Jamaica	11	(2)
- * Club domestic league appearances and goals

Tremaine Stewart (5 January 1988 – 18 April 2021) was a Jamaican professional footballer who played as a forward or winger.

== Club career ==
Nicknamed 'Tan Tan', he began his career in his native homeland, playing for August Town and Portmore United in Jamaica National Premier League, before he transferred to Aalesund and Tippeligaen prior to the 2012 season.

On 25 March 2012, he made his first league appearance for Aalesund coming on as a substitute against Stabæk. He later scored his first goal for Aalesund against Haugesund on 16 May 2012 in his fifth league appearance for the club. He scored goals in both Aalesund's Europa League wins against KF Tirana.

The latter half of the 2012 season was bright for the Jamaican. On 29 July, he scored his second league goal for the club in the home 3–1 win against Stabæk, while he scored two times in an away win against Fredrikstad FK. This was Aalesund's first away win in 14 months.

During July 2014, Stewart left Aalesund returning to Jamaica. Just over a year later, Stewart returned to Northern Europe, signing for Veikkausliiga side RoPS on a one-year contract.

On his return to Jamaica, he played again for Portmore United and Waterhouse before joining Dunbeholden in summer 2020.

== International career ==
On 24 February 2012, he made his international debut against Cuba coming on as a substitute. He made his first start and scored his first goal (Jamaica's second goal) in a 3–2 win over New Zealand on 29 February 2012.

== Death ==
Stewart died suddenly and unexpectedly on the morning of 18 April 2021, after collapsing while playing in Spanish Town. Despite being brought to the nearest hospital, he could not be resuscitated.

== Career statistics ==
As of match played 25 October 2015

Appearances and goals by club, season and competition
Club	Season	League			Cup		Continental		Total	
Club	Season	Division	Apps	Goals	Apps	Goals	Apps	Goals	Apps	Goals
Aalesund	2012	Tippeligaen	21	4	4	0	2	2	27	6
Aalesund	2013	Tippeligaen	8	2	1	0	0	0	9	2
Aalesund	2014	Tippeligaen	5	0	3	1	0	0	8	1
Aalesund	Total		34	6	8	1	2	2	44	9
RoPS	2015	Veikkausliiga	4	0	0	0	0	0	4	0
Career total			38	6	8	1	2	2	48	9

== See also ==
- List of association footballers who died while playing
