= Demar Phillips =

Jamaican footballer (born 1983)

Personal information
- Full name: Demar Constantine Phillips
- Date of birth: 23 September 1983 (age 43)
- Place of birth: Kingston, Jamaica
- Height: 5 ft 6 in (1.68 m)
- Position: Left wing back

Youth career
- York United

Senior career*
| Years | Team | Apps | (Gls) |
| 2003–2007 | Waterhouse | 52 | (15) |
| 2007–2009 | Stoke City | 2 | (0) |
| 2009–2014 | Aalesund | 120 | (12) |
| 2015–2018 | Real Salt Lake | 65 | (0) |
| 2017 | → Real Monarchs (loan) | 3 | (0) |
| 2019 | Austin Bold | 15 | (0) |
| Total | | 257 | (27) |

International career
| 2006–2016 | Jamaica | 72 | (12) |
Medal record
Men's football
Representing Jamaica
CONCACAF Gold Cup
| Runner-up | 2015 United States–Canada | Team |
- * Club domestic league appearances and goals

Demar Constantine Phillips (born 23 September 1983) is a Jamaican former footballer who played as a left wingback.

== Early life ==
Demar Phillips was born on 23 September 1983 in a small town in the district of St Thomas outside Kingston. He describes growing up in among deep poverty, saying he "knew what it was like to starve".

== Club career ==
=== Waterhouse ===
After starting his youth career at York United in the St Thomas Parish leagues and Eastern Confederation Super League, Phillips made the move to Waterhouse Football Club, starting with their u21 team before becoming a senior team regular.

=== Stoke City ===
With reference from Jamaican teammate Ricardo Fuller to boss Tony Pulis, Phillips signed a three-year contract for Stoke City, on 31 August 2007 from Jamaican club Waterhouse, for an undisclosed fee. After appearing on the substitutes bench against Leicester City, Sheffield Wednesday, Crystal Palace and Scunthorpe United, Phillips finally made his first team debut on 10 November 2007 in the game against Sheffield United, in which he came on as a 78th-minute substitute.

Phillips made only two appearances for Stoke, however, and in the summer of 2008 joined Oldham Athletic on trial with a view to a season-long loan. Problems with obtaining a work permit saw this fall through and he returned to Stoke. He again struggled to force his way into the Premier side's first team squad and at the end of the transfer window in January 2009 he joined Norwegian side Aalesunds FK on a free transfer.

=== Aalesunds FK ===
Phillips made his Aalesund-debut on 15 March 2009, playing at left back against Tromsø IL. He played in the Norwegian Football Cup final as a substitute, which Aalesund won on penalties, one of which he scored. Phillips was named man of the match after scoring both goals in a 2–0 win against Hønefoss on 21 March 2010. On 20 August 2011, Phillips signed a new contract with Aalesunds FK until 2014.

=== Real Salt Lake ===
Phillips signed with Real Salt Lake of Major League Soccer in January 2015. He was released following the 2015 season. In January 2016, RSL re-signed Phillips for the 2016 season. At the conclusion of the 2018 season, RSL declined the 2019 contract option on Phillips.

=== Austin Bold FC ===
Phillips was signed by USL Championship club Austin Bold FC early in their inaugural season, on 18 April 2019.

== International career ==
Phillips has appeared for the Jamaica national football team a total of 72 times scoring twelve goals. On 6 June 2011, Phillips scored the third goal in a 4–0 win. On 10 June 2011, Phillips scored a brace in a 2–0 win over Guatemala, being named man of the match.

== Personal life ==
Phillips has one daughter and one son. His daughter is named Jadyn, who currently lives in Jamaica with her mother, who is a university employee. Phillips and Jadyn's mother are separated. His son's name is Demarco, who currently lives in Utah with his mother. Demarco was born in 2017 when Phillips was playing for Real Salt Lake. Phillips is a devout Christian, himself stating that he devotes a considerable amount of time to prayer. He explained: "I pray to God a lot. In the morning and at night before I go to bed. When I step onto the pitch before a game, I stop before the sidelines, taking to the ground with my hands, before I do the sign of the cross and look up at the sky. Then I know that God will protect me during the game".

== Career statistics ==
=== Club ===
Appearances and goals by club, season and competition
| Club | Season | League | | | Cup | | League Cup | | Other | | Total | |
| Club | Season | Division | Apps | Goals | Apps | Goals | Apps | Goals | Apps | Goals | Apps | Goals |
|---|---|---|---|---|---|---|---|---|---|---|---|---|
| Stoke City | 2007–08 | Championship | 2 | 0 | 0 | 0 | 0 | 0 | — | | 2 | 0 |
| Stoke City | 2008–09 | Premier League | 0 | 0 | 0 | 0 | 2 | 0 | — | | 2 | 0 |
| Stoke City | Total | | 2 | 0 | 0 | 0 | 2 | 0 | — | | 4 | 0 |
| Aalesund | 2009 | Tippeligaen | 21 | 0 | 5 | 0 | — | | — | | 26 | 0 |
| Aalesund | 2010 | Tippeligaen | 17 | 3 | 1 | 0 | — | | 2 | 0 | 20 | 3 |
| Aalesund | 2011 | Tippeligaen | 22 | 7 | 3 | 1 | — | | 5 | 0 | 30 | 8 |
| Aalesund | 2012 | Tippeligaen | 20 | 0 | 3 | 2 | — | | — | | 23 | 2 |
| Aalesund | 2013 | Tippeligaen | 15 | 1 | 0 | 0 | — | | — | | 15 | 1 |
| Aalesund | 2014 | Tippeligaen | 25 | 1 | 2 | 1 | — | | — | | 27 | 2 |
| Aalesund | Total | | 120 | 12 | 14 | 4 | — | | 7 | 0 | 141 | 16 |
| Real Salt Lake | 2015 | Major League Soccer | 18 | 0 | 3 | 0 | — | | 3 | 0 | 24 | 0 |
| Real Salt Lake | 2016 | Major League Soccer | 30 | 0 | 1 | 0 | — | | — | | 31 | 0 |
| Real Salt Lake | 2017 | Major League Soccer | 13 | 0 | 0 | 0 | — | | — | | 13 | 0 |
| Real Salt Lake | 2018 | Major League Soccer | 5 | 0 | 0 | 0 | — | | — | | 5 | 0 |
| Real Salt Lake | Total | | 66 | 0 | 4 | 0 | 2 | 0 | 3 | 0 | 73 | 0 |
| Real Monarchs | 2017 | USL Championship | 2 | 0 | — | | — | | — | | 2 | 0 |
| Real Monarchs | 2018 | USL Championship | 1 | 0 | — | | — | | — | | 1 | 0 |
| Real Monarchs | Total | | 3 | 0 | — | | — | | — | | 3 | 0 |
| Austin Bold | 2019 | USL Championship | 15 | 0 | 1 | 0 | — | | — | | 16 | 0 |
| Career total | | | 206 | 12 | 19 | 4 | 2 | 0 | 10 | 0 | 237 | 16 |

=== International ===
| National team | Year | Apps | Goals |
|---|---|---|---|
| Jamaica | 2006 | 6 | 2 |
| Jamaica | 2007 | 9 | 0 |
| Jamaica | 2008 | 17 | 3 |
| Jamaica | 2009 | 7 | 0 |
| Jamaica | 2010 | 3 | 0 |
| Jamaica | 2011 | 9 | 5 |
| Jamaica | 2012 | 8 | 2 |
| Jamaica | 2013 | 5 | 0 |
| Jamaica | 2014 | 3 | 0 |
| Jamaica | 2015 | 3 | 0 |
| Jamaica | 2016 | 2 | 0 |
| Total | | 72 | 12 |

| # | Date | Venue | Opponent | Score | Result | Competitions |
|---|---|---|---|---|---|---|
| 1. | 27 September 2006 | Independence Park, Kingston, Jamaica | Saint Lucia | 3 – 0 | 4 – 0 | 2007 Caribbean Cup qualification |
| 2. | 8 October 2006 | Independence Park, Kingston, Jamaica | Canada | 2 – 1 | 2 – 1 | Friendly |
| 3. | 4 June 2008 | Independence Park, Kingston, Jamaica | Saint Vincent and the Grenadines | 1 – 0 | 5 – 1 | Friendly |
| 4. | 15 June 2008 | Independence Park, Kingston, Jamaica | Bahamas | 2 – 0 | 7 – 0 | 2010 FIFA World Cup qualification |
| 5. | 5 December 2008 | Jarrett Park, Montego Bay, Jamaica | Grenada | 4 – 0 | 4 – 0 | 2008 Caribbean Championship |
| 6. | 6 June 2011 | The Home Depot Center, Carson, United States | Grenada | 3 – 0 | 4 – 0 | 2011 CONCACAF Gold Cup |
| 7. | 10 June 2011 | FIU Stadium, Miami, United States | Guatemala | 1 – 0 | 2 – 0 | 2011 CONCACAF Gold Cup |
| 8. | 10 June 2011 | FIU Stadium, Miami, United States | Guatemala | 2 – 0 | 2 – 0 | 2011 CONCACAF Gold Cup |
| 9. | 2 September 2011 | Estadio Olímpico Atahualpa, Quito, Ecuador | Ecuador | 2 – 5 | 2 – 5 | Friendly |
| 10. | 8 June 2012 | Independence Park, Kingston, Jamaica | Guatemala | 1 – 0 | 2 – 1 | 2014 World Cup qualification |
| 11. | 17 October 2012 | Independence Park, Kingston, Jamaica | Antigua and Barbuda | 1 – 0 | 4 – 1 | 2014 World Cup qualification |

== Honours ==
Jamaica

- Caribbean Cup:
  - Winner:2008

Waterhouse

- Jamaica National Premier League:
  - Winner (1): 2006

Aalesunds FK

- Norwegian Football Cup:
  - Winner (2): 2009, 2011
