= Fredrik Ulvestad =

Norwegian footballer (born 1992)

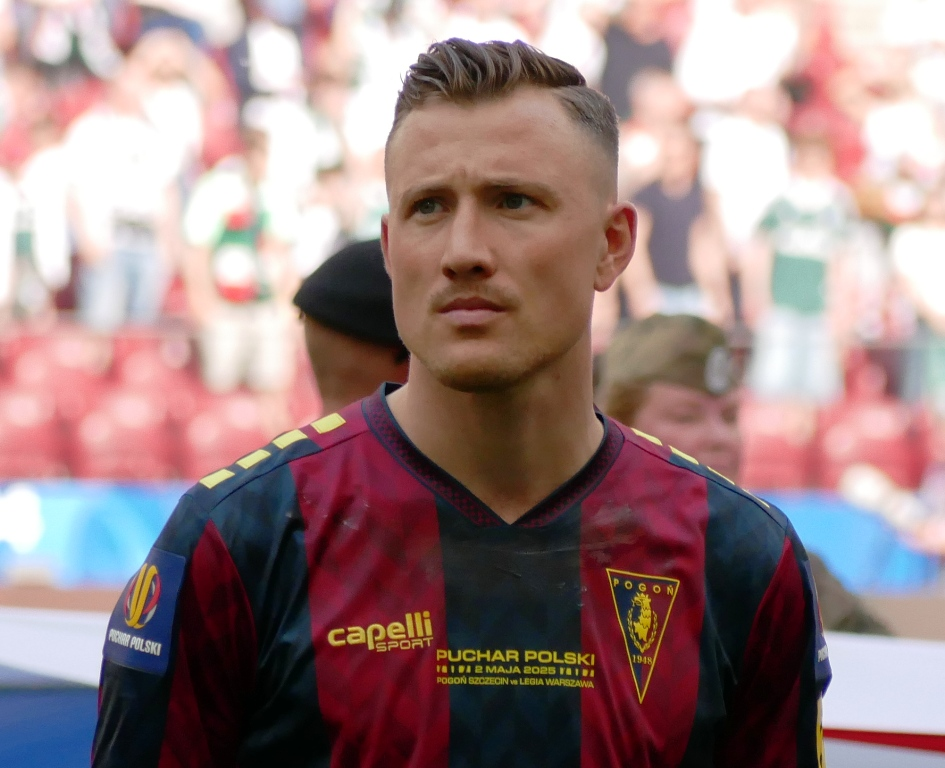
- Fredrik Ulvestad with Pogoń Szczecin (2025)

Personal information
- Full name: Fredrik Stensøe Ulvestad
- Date of birth: 17 June 1992 (age 34)
- Place of birth: Ålesund, Norway
- Height: 1.83 m (6 ft 0 in)
- Position: Midfielder

Team information
- Current team: OB

Youth career
- –2008: Herd
- 2008–2010: Aalesund

Senior career*
Years	Team	Apps	(Gls)
2010–2014	Aalesund	106	(14)
2015–2018	Burnley	7	(0)
2016–2017	→ Charlton Athletic (loan)	27	(1)
2018–2020	Djurgårdens IF	80	(17)
2021	Qingdao FC	4	(0)
2021–2023	Sivasspor	44	(3)
2023–2026	Pogoń Szczecin	96	(17)
2026–	OB	0	(0)

International career
2012	Norway U20	1	(0)
2012–2014	Norway U21	14	(0)
2011–2014	Norway U23	2	(0)
2014–2020	Norway	4	(0)
- * Club domestic league appearances and goals as of 19:11, 2 September 2026 (UTC)

Fredrik Stensøe Ulvestad (born 17 June 1992) is a Norwegian professional footballer who plays as a midfielder for Danish Superliga club OB.

== Career ==
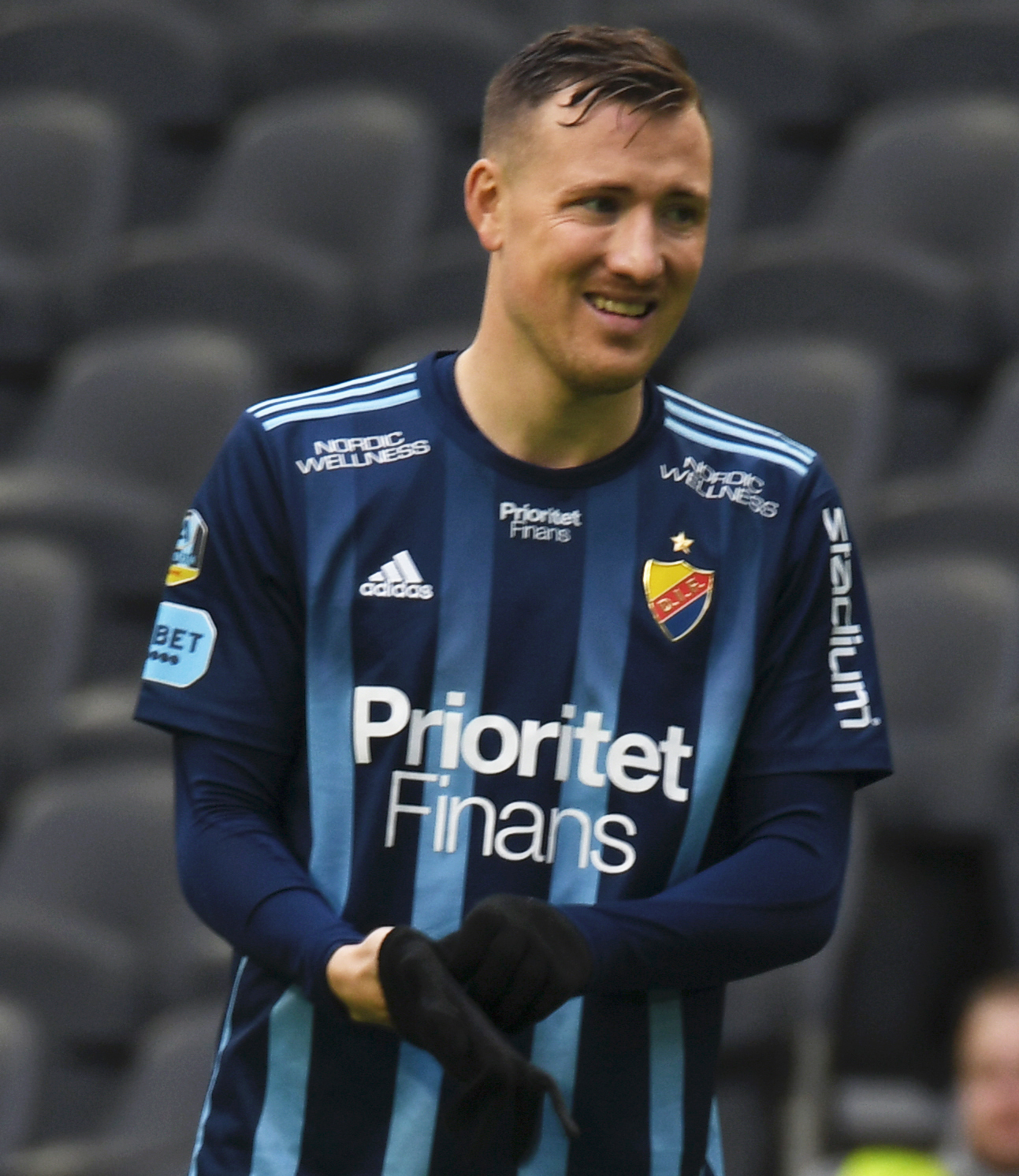
Ulvestad with Djurgårdens IF in 2020

Ulvestad started his career in the youth team of SK Herd before signing for hometown club Aalesunds FK in 2008. He made his first team debut for the club in May 2010 at the age of 17, replacing Jonathan Parr as a substitute in a 1–0 win over Volda TI in the Norwegian Football Cup. In April 2011, he scored his first goal for the club in a 1–0 win over Sogndal IL. He made his breakthrough to the first team during the 2011 season where he established himself as a regular in the side, also winning the 2011 Norwegian Football Cup in the 2–1 win over SK Brann. During his time with the club he featured in UEFA Europa League qualifiers in 2011 and 2012, however, Aalesund failed to make it to the tournament proper.

At the end of the 2014 season, Ulvestad decided not to renew his contract, and became a free agent. His final game for Aalesund was in November 2014, in the 2–1 win over Sandnes Ulf. In total he made 132 appearances for Aalesund in all competitions scoring 20 goals.

Following his departure from Aalesund, Ulvestad attracted interest from German Bundesliga side Hannover 96, before training with Premier League side Burnley in February 2015. In March 2015, he made the move permanent signing a three-year contract with the club.

On 31 August 2016, Ulvestad joined Charlton Athletic on a season long loan. Ulvestad scored his first goal for the club in a 1–1 draw against Port Vale on 18 October 2016.

On 10 May 2018, he played as Djurgården beat Malmö FF 3–0 in the Swedish Cup Final.

== International career ==
Ulvestad was first called up for international duty for the under-23 side in November 2011, playing in the 1–1 draw with Turkey. He also made one cap for the under-20 side a year later in October 2012 in a friendly against the Netherlands. He made his debut for the under-21 side in February 2012, replacing Jonas Svensson in a 2–2 friendly draw with Slovenia. His competitive debut came in the 2013 UEFA European Under-21 Championship qualifier against Azerbaijan. He played in two further qualifiers against England and Belgium, but failed to make it into the 23-man squad that qualified for the final tournament. He played in five qualifiers for the 2015 UEFA European Under-21 Championship, however Norway failed to qualify. In total he gained 14 caps for the under-21 side. He made his debut for the senior side in August 2014, replacing Fredrik Gulbrandsen at half time in an international friendly against United Arab Emirates, finishing 0–0 in Stavanger.

== Personal life ==
His father Rune Ulvestad played for Molde FK and Aalesunds FK during the 1980s, whilst his two other brothers Pål Erik Ulvestad and Dan Peter Ulvestad play for Norwegian Eliteserien side Kristiansund BK.

== Career statistics ==
=== Club ===
As of match played 29 August 2026

Appearances and goals by club, season and competition
Club	Season	League			National cup (Note: Includes Norwegian Cup, FA Cup, Svenska Cupen, Turkish Cup, Polish Cup)		League cup (Note: Includes EFL Cup)		Other		Total	
Club	Season	Division	Apps	Goals	Apps	Goals	Apps	Goals	Apps	Goals	Apps	Goals
Aalesund	2010	Tippeligaen	1	0	1	0	—		0	0	2	0
Aalesund	2011	Tippeligaen	24	2	6	2	—		6 (Note: Appearances in UEFA Europa League)	2	36	6
Aalesund	2012	Tippeligaen	25	2	4	1	—		3	0	32	3
Aalesund	2013	Tippeligaen	27	7	3	1	—		—		30	8
Aalesund	2014	Tippeligaen	29	3	3	0	—		—		32	3
Aalesund	Total		106	14	17	4	—		9	2	132	20
Burnley	2014–15	Premier League	2	0	—		—		—		2	0
Burnley	2015–16	Championship	5	0	2	0	0	0	—		7	0
Burnley	2016–17	Premier League	0	0	—		1	0	—		1	0
Burnley	2017–18	Premier League	0	0	0	0	0	0	—		0	0
Burnley	Total		7	0	2	0	1	0	—		10	0
Charlton Athletic (loan)	2016–17	League One	27	1	2	0	—		2 (Note: Appearances in EFL Trophy)	0	31	1
Djurgårdens IF	2018	Allsvenskan	23	1	5	0	—		2	0	30	1
Djurgårdens IF	2019	Allsvenskan	30	5	3	0	—		0	0	33	5
Djurgårdens IF	2020	Allsvenskan	27	11	3	1	—		0	0	30	12
Djurgårdens IF	Total		80	17	11	1	—		2	0	93	18
Qingdao FC	2021	Chinese Super League	4	0	0	0	—		—		4	0
Sivasspor	2021–22	Süper Lig	16	2	3	0	—		—		19	2
Sivasspor	2022–23	Süper Lig	28	1	4	0	—		10 (Note: Two appearances in UEFA Europa League, seven appearances and one goal in UEFA Europa Conference League, one appearance in TFF Süper Kupa)	1	42	2
Sivasspor	Total		44	3	7	0	—		10	1	61	4
Pogoń Szczecin	2023–24	Ekstraklasa	26	6	5	1	—		—		31	7
Pogoń Szczecin	2024–25	Ekstraklasa	33	6	6	0	—		—		39	6
Pogoń Szczecin	2025–26	Ekstraklasa	32	5	2	0	—		—		34	5
Pogoń Szczecin	2026–27	Ekstraklasa	5	0	—		—		—		5	0
Pogoń Szczecin	Total		96	17	13	1	—		—		109	18
OB	2026–27	Danish Superliga	0	0	0	0	—		—		0	0
Career total			364	52	52	6	1	0	23	3	440	61

=== International ===
As of match played 18 November 2020

Appearances and goals by national team and year
National team	Year	Apps	Goals
Norway	2014	1	0
Norway	2019	2	0
Norway	2020	1	0
Total		4	0

== Honours ==
Aalesund

- Norwegian Football Cup: 2011

Burnley

- Championship: 2015–16

Djurgårdens IF

- Allsvenskan: 2019
- Svenska Cupen: 2017–18

Sivasspor

- Turkish Cup: 2021–22
