= Lars Fuhre =

Norwegian footballer (born 1989)

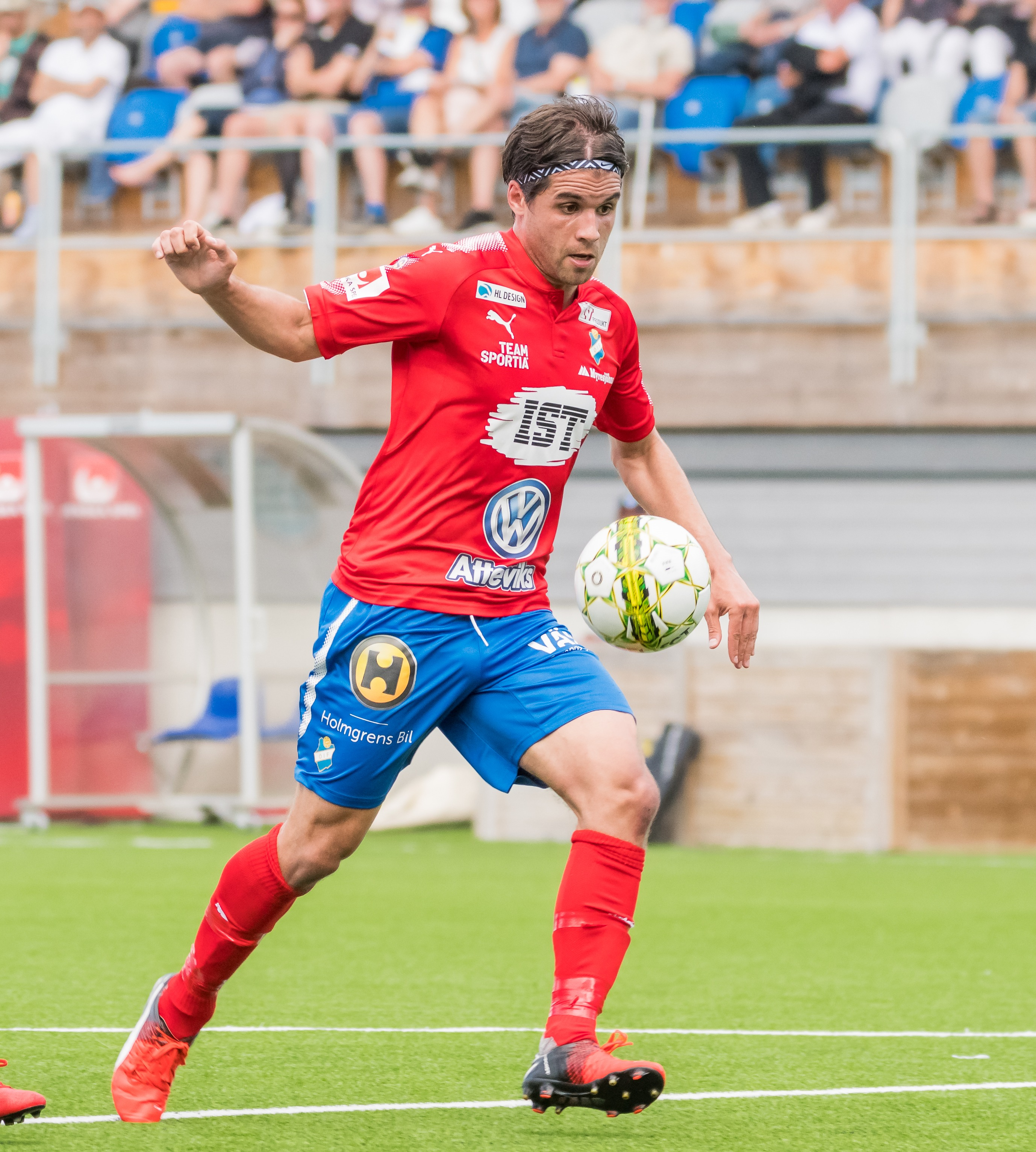

Personal information
- Full name: Lars Mendonça Fuhre
- Date of birth: 29 September 1989 (age 37)
- Place of birth: Norway
- Height: 1.81 m (5 ft 11 1/2 in)
- Position: Midfielder

Team information
- Current team: Asker
- Number: 8

Youth career
- Hokksund
- 2006: Strømsgodset

Senior career*
Years	Team	Apps	(Gls)
2006–2008	Strømsgodset	2	(0)
2008–2010	Nybergsund	35	(5)
2010–2013	Aalesund	45	(6)
2014–2015	Hammarby IF	44	(7)
2016	Mjøndalen	30	(1)
2017–2018	Öster	39	(4)
2018	Örgryte	12	(0)
2019–	Asker	36	(9)
- * Club domestic league appearances and goals as of 3 October 2020

Lars Mendonça Fuhre (born 29 September 1989) is a Norwegian association footballer who plays for Asker.

== Club career ==
Described as a major youth talent, Fuhre started his career with the native club Hokksund IL before moving to Strømsgodset where he remained for three seasons. After getting limited playing time in Drammen he transferred, at the suggestion of Kjetil Rekdal, to second-tier club Nybergsund in 2008 in order to get more playing time at senior level. After two seasons however, Fuhre transferred Aalesund, the club Rekdal was now coaching, as a bosman player. The transfer-fee was estimated at 100,000 NOK (€12,500). His senior debut came on 1 August 2010 against his former teammates in the 3-1 away loss at the hands of Strømsgodset.

Whilst playing for Aalesund during the 2011–12 UEFA Europa League qualifying phase and play-off round, Fuhre scored in Aalesunds 5-1 win over Welsh team Neath F.C.

In March 2017, he signed a two-year contract with Östers IF in Superettan, Sweden's second tier.

On 23 December 2018, Fuhre signed with Asker Fotball for the 2019 season.

== Career statistics ==
=== Club ===
As of match played 3 October 2020

Appearances and goals by club, season and competition
Club	Season	League			National Cup		Continental		Total	
Club	Season	Division	Apps	Goals	Apps	Goals	Apps	Goals	Apps	Goals
Strømsgodset	2006	1. divisjon	2	0	0	0	-		2	0
Strømsgodset	2007	Eliteserien	0	0	1	0	-		1	0
Strømsgodset	2008	Eliteserien	0	0	1	0	-		1	0
Strømsgodset	Total		2	0	2	0	-	-	4	0
Nybergsund	2008	1. divisjon	12	0	0	0	-		12	0
Nybergsund	2009	1. divisjon	11	0	0	0	-		11	0
Nybergsund	2010	1. divisjon	12	5	3	1	-		15	6
Nybergsund	Total		35	5	3	1	-	-	38	6
Aalesund	2010	Eliteserien	8	0	0	0	-		8	0
Aalesund	2011	Eliteserien	8	0	3	1	4	2	15	3
Aalesund	2012	Eliteserien	17	5	3	0	4	0	24	5
Aalesund	2013	Eliteserien	12	1	2	0	-		14	1
Aalesund	Total		45	6	8	1	8	2	61	9
Hammarby	2014	Superettan	30	7	3	2	-		33	9
Hammarby	2015	Allsvenskan	14	0	4	0	-		18	0
Hammarby	Total		44	7	7	2	-	-	51	9
Mjøndalen	2016	1. divisjon	30	1	1	0	-		31	1
Mjøndalen	Total		30	1	1	0	-	-	31	1
Öster	2017	Superettan	28	4	0	0	-		28	4
Öster	2018	Superettan	11	0	3	0	-		14	0
Öster	Total		39	4	3	0	-	-	42	4
Örgryte	2018	Superettan	12	0	1	0	-		13	0
Örgryte	Total		12	0	1	0	-	-	13	0
Asker	2019	2. divisjon	25	7	2	0	-		27	7
Asker	2020	2. divisjon	11	2	0	0	-		11	2
Asker	Total		36	9	2	0	-	-	38	9
Career total			243	32	27	4	8	2	278	38
