= 2016 Aalesunds FK season =

Aalesund
2016 season
- Chairman: Kjell Tennfjord
- Manager: Trond Fredriksen (interim)
- Stadium: Color Line Stadion
- Tippeligaen: 9th
- Norwegian Cup: Third Roundvs Brattvåg
- Top goalscorer: League: Mustafa Abdellaoue (13); All: Mustafa Abdellaoue (17)

The 2016 season was Aalesund's tenth consecutive season in the Tippeligaen.

== Squad ==
As of 19 August 2016

Note: Flags indicate national team as defined under FIFA eligibility rules; some limited exceptions apply. Players may hold more than one non-FIFA nationality.

No.	Pos.	Nation	Player
1	GK	NOR	Andreas Lie
2	DF	DEN	Mikkel Kirkeskov
3	DF	ISL	Daníel Leó Grétarsson
4	DF	FIN	Tero Mäntylä
5	DF	NOR	Oddbjørn Lie
6	DF	NED	Vito Wormgoor
7	FW	CIV	Franck Boli (on loan from Liaoning)
8	MF	NOR	Fredrik Carlsen
10	MF	NOR	Peter Orry Larsen
11	MF	ISL	Aron Elís Þrándarson
14	MF	NED	Edwin Gyasi
15	MF	BRA	Marlinho
18	MF	NOR	Vebjørn Hoff
19	FW	KOS	Flamur Kastrati

No.	Pos.	Nation	Player
21	MF	NOR	Bjørn Helge Riise
22	DF	ISL	Adam Örn Arnarson
23	DF	NOR	Edvard Skagestad
24	GK	NOR	Lars Cramer
30	FW	NOR	Mustafa Abdellaoue
31	FW	NOR	Sebastian Andreassen
32	GK	NOR	Sondre Sødergren
35	DF	NOR	Lars Valderhaug
36	MF	NOR	Emil Solnørdal
37	DF	NOR	Joakim Barstad
38	MF	NOR	Jørgen Hatlehol
39	DF	NOR	Sigurd Tafjord
40	MF	NOR	Sondre Brunstad Fet

== Transfers ==
=== Winter ===
In: Note: Flags indicate national team as defined under FIFA eligibility rules; some limited exceptions apply. Players may hold more than one non-FIFA nationality.

No.	Pos.	Nation	Player
2	DF	DEN	Mikkel Kirkeskov (from (Denmark) OB)
6	DF	NOR	John Arne Riise (from (India) Delhi Dynamos)
7	FW	CIV	Franck Boli (from (China) Liaoning Whowin)
14	MF	NED	Edwin Gyasi (from (Netherlands) Roda JC Kerkrade)
15	FW	BRA	Marlinho (from (Brazil) Duque de Caxias, previously on loan)
22	DF	ISL	Adam Örn Arnarson (from (Denmark) Nordsjælland)
24	GK	NOR	Lars Cramer (from (Sweden) Kalmar)

Out: Note: Flags indicate national team as defined under FIFA eligibility rules; some limited exceptions apply. Players may hold more than one non-FIFA nationality.

No.	Pos.	Nation	Player
2	DF	NGR	Akeem Latifu
6	DF	SWE	Mikael Dyrestam (to (Netherlands) NEC)
9	FW	SWE	Carl Björk (to (Sweden) Nyköping)
13	GK	NOR	Sten Grytebust (to (Denmark) OB)
14	FW	NGR	Leke James (to (China) BG)
16	MF	NOR	Magne Hoseth (to (Norway) Notodden)
17	MF	NOR	Henrik Bjørdal (to (England) Brighton & Hove Albion)
22	DF	NOR	Jo Nymo Matland (to (Belgium) Antwerp)

=== Summer ===
In: Note: Flags indicate national team as defined under FIFA eligibility rules; some limited exceptions apply. Players may hold more than one non-FIFA nationality.

No.	Pos.	Nation	Player
6	DF	NED	Vito Wormgoor (from (Netherlands) ADO Den Haag)
19	FW	KOS	Flamur Kastrati (from (Norway) Strømsgodset)

Out: Note: Flags indicate national team as defined under FIFA eligibility rules; some limited exceptions apply. Players may hold more than one non-FIFA nationality.

No.	Pos.	Nation	Player
6	DF	NOR	John Arne Riise (retired)
20	MF	NOR	Thomas Martinussen (to (Norway) Brattvåg)
—	FW	NOR	Torbjørn Grytten (to (Norway) Brattvåg, loan made permanent)

== Friendlies ==
22 January 2016	Aalesund	3–1	Brattvåg	Ålesund
18:00 CET (UTC+1)	Skagestad 6'; Abdellaoue 9'; Hoff 46'	Summary	86'	Stadium: Color Line Stadion

31 January 2016	Aalesund	0–2	Hødd	Ålesund
18:00 CET (UTC+1)		Summary	Shroot 11'; Ø.Vestvatn 83'	Stadium: Color Line Stadion

6 February 2016	Aalesund (Norway)	2–1	(Finland) SJK	Ålesund
17:00 CET (UTC+1)	Marlinho 17'; Larsen 28'	Report	Kink 20'	Stadium: Color Line Stadion

13 February 2016	Djurgården (Sweden)	2–0	(Norway) Aalesund	Stockholm, Sweden
15:30 CET (UTC+1)	Walker 40'; Olunga 69'	Report		Stadium: Tele2 Arena

20 February 2016	Aalesund (Norway)	2–2	(Slovenia) Koper	La Manga, Spain
17:00 CET (UTC+1)	Riise 35'; Abdellaoue 41'	Report	Štromajer 21'; Rahmanović 28'

23 February 2016	Aalesund (Norway)	4–1	(Malta) Hibernians	La Manga, Spain
16:00 CET (UTC+1)	Larsen 47'; Boli 49'; Þrándarson 70'; Kirkeskov 90'	Report	Jorginho 63'

1 March 2016	Aalesund	3–3	Kristiansund	Ålesund
18:00 CET (UTC+1)	Mos 4'; Fet 29'; Björk 63'	Summary	Kalludra 13'; Bamba 65', 90'	Stadium: Color Line Stadion

5 March 2016	Molde	2–0	Aalesund	Molde
14:00 CET (UTC+1)	Guðjohnsen (yellow card) 43'; Gulbrandsen 59'; Agnaldo 72'; Peiponen (yellow card) 75'	Summary	Kirkeskov (yellow card) 33'; Skagestad (yellow card) 41'	Stadium: Aker Stadion

29 June 2016	Hammarby (Sweden)	4–1	(Norway) Aalesund	Stockholm, Sweden
13:00 CET (UTC+1)	Smárason 31', 58' (pen.); Bakircioglu 35'; Israelsson 61'	Summary	Skagestad (red card) 57'; Þrándarson 73'	Stadium: Tele2 Arena

== Competitions ==
=== Tippeligaen ===
==== Results summary ====
Overall								Home						Away					
Pld	W	D	L	GF	GA	GD	Pts	W	D	L	GF	GA	GD	W	D	L	GF	GA	GD
30	12	7	11	46	50	−4	43	6	5	3	26	19	+7	6	2	8	20	31	−11

Last updated: 7 November 2016.
Source: See Results

==== Results by round ====
Round	1	2	3	4	5	6	7	8	9	10	11	12	13	14	15	16	17	18	19	20	21	22	23	24	25	26	27	28	29	30
Ground	H	A	H	A	H	A	H	A	H	A	H	A	H	A	A	H	A	H	A	H	A	H	A	H	A	H	H	A	H	A
Result	W	L	L	L	L	D	W	L	L	L	D	W	D	L	L	D	L	W	W	L	L	D	W	W	W	W	W	W	D	W
Position	5	8	11	14	15	14	12	12	12	12	12	12	12	12	14	14	14	14	14	14	15	15	14	12	10	10	10	9	9	9

Updated to match(es) played on 7 November 2016. Source: See Results
A = Away; H = Home; W = Win; D = Draw; L = Loss

==== Results ====
11 March 2015 1	Aalesund	1–0	Stabæk	Ålesund
19:00 CET (UTC+1)	Larsen 47'	Summary	Issah (yellow card) 71'	Stadium: Color Line Stadion; Attendance: 5,941; Referee: Tore Hansen

19 March 2016 2	Haugesund	3–0	Aalesund	Haugesund
15:30 CEST (UTC+1)	Troost-Ekong 9', (yellow card) 28'; Tronstad 38', (yellow card) 73'; Agdestein (yellow card) 54'; Miljeteig (yellow card) 62'; Hajradinović (yellow card) 77'; Karikari 90'	Summary	Arnarson (yellow card) 27'	Stadium: Haugesund Stadion; Attendance: 5,168; Referee: Trond Ivar Døvle

3 April 2016 3	Aalesund	1–2	Brann	Ålesund
18:00 CEST (UTC+2)	Larsen 6', (yellow card) 35'; Gyasi (yellow card) 25'	Summary	Braaten (yellow card) 43'; Johansen (yellow card) 53', (goal) 59'; Karadas 83'; Kristiansen (yellow card) 90+1'	Stadium: Color Line Stadion; Attendance: 10,013; Referee: Tom Harald Hagen

10 April 2016 4	Rosenborg	1–0	Aalesund	Trondheim
18:00 CEST (UTC+2)	Helland (yellow card) 32'; Jensen (yellow card) 45'; Reginiussen 69'	Summary	Boli (yellow card) 30'; Þrándarson (yellow card) 44'; Carlsen (yellow card) 68'	Stadium: Lerkendal Stadion; Attendance: 16,996; Referee: Kim Andre Johnsen

17 April 2016 5	Aalesund	1–2	Viking	Ålesund
18:00 CEST (UTC+2)	Boli 11'; Larsen (yellow card) 14'; Carlsen (yellow card) 24'; Kirkeskov (yellow card) 71'; B. H. Riise (yellow card) 89'	Summary	Adegbenro (yellow card) 4'; Bringaker 41'; Abdullahi 56'	Stadium: Color Line Stadion; Attendance: 5,798; Referee: Trond Ivar Døvle

22 April 2016 6	Lillestrøm	1–1	Aalesund	Kjeller
19:00 CEST (UTC+2)	Martin (yellow card) 7'; Friday 38'	Summary	Kirkeskov (yellow card) 25'; Arnarson (yellow card) 37'; Boli 39'; O.Lie (yellow card) 54'	Stadium: Åråsen Stadion; Attendance: 4,774; Referee: Kai Erik Steen

24 April 2016 7	Aalesund	6–0	Tromsø	Ålesund
18:00 CEST (UTC+2)	B. H. Riise (yellow card) 17'; Mos 30', 48', 52'; Boli 41'; Hoff 46'; Þrándarson 82'	Summary	Moussa (yellow card) 57'; Landu Landu (yellow card) 67'	Stadium: Color Line Stadion; Attendance: 5,215; Referee: Espen Eskås

30 April 2016 8	Molde	1–0	Aalesund	Molde
18:00 CEST (UTC+2)	Forren (yellow card) 14'; Toivio (yellow card) 83'; Gulbrandsen 90+3'	Summary	A. Lie (yellow card) 6'; O. Lie (yellow card) 81'	Stadium: Aker Stadion; Attendance: 9,661; Referee: Svein Oddvar Moen

8 May 2016 9	Aalesund	1–4	Sogndal	Ålesund
18:00 CEST (UTC+2)	Mos 1'; Carlsen (yellow card) 40'	Summary	Sveen 13'; Birkelund (yellow card) 47'; Kirkeskov 51' (o.g.); Ramsland 64'; Koomson 66'	Stadium: Color Line Stadion; Attendance: 5,408; Referee: Ola Hobber Nilsen

12 May 2016 10	Sarpsborg 08	1–0	Aalesund	Sarpsborg
19:00 CEST (UTC+2)	Groven (yellow card) 40'; Trondsen 45+1'; Hansen (yellow card) 49'; Hovda (yellow card) 83'	Summary	Gyasi (yellow card) 72'	Stadium: Sarpsborg Stadion; Attendance: 3,540; Referee: Tom Harald Hagen

16 May 2016 11	Aalesund	1–1	Start	Ålesund
15:30 CEST (UTC+2)	B.H. Riise (yellow card) 61'; Skagestad 78'	Summary	Nwakali 65'	Stadium: Color Line Stadion; Attendance: 6,751; Referee: Tommy Skjerven

22 May 2016 12	Bodø/Glimt	0–1	Aalesund	Bodø
15:00 CEST (UTC+2)	Moe (yellow card) 90+1'	Summary	Lie 8'; Arnarson (yellow card) 31' (yellow-red card); Hoff (yellow card) 85'	Stadium: Aspmyra Stadion; Attendance: 7,513; Referee: Espen Eskås

29 May 2016 13	Aalesund	2–2	Vålerenga	Ålesund
20:00 CEST (UTC+2)	Gyasi 12' 82'	Summary	Berge (yellow card) 38'; Ómarsson 71'; Wæhler 88'	Stadium: Color Line Stadion; Attendance: 6,121; Referee: Tom Harald Hagen

4 July 2016 14	Strømsgodset	4–2	Aalesund	Drammen
19:00 CEST (UTC+2)	Keita 17'; Kirkeskov 26' (o.g.); Vilsvik 74'; Kastrati 90+7' (yellow card) 90+8'	Summary	Mos 5'; Larsen 34'; Riise (yellow card) 80'	Stadium: Marienlyst Stadion; Attendance: 6,467; Referee: Kai Erik Steen

10 July 2016 15	Odd	4–1	Aalesund	Skien
18:00 CEST (UTC+2)	Occéan 15' 59'; Akabueze 38'; Zekhnini 67'	Summary	Riise (yellow card) 30'; Boli (yellow card) 45+2'; Gyasi 47'	Stadium: Skagerak Arena; Attendance: 7,067; Referee: Espen Eskås

16 July 2016 16	Aalesund	1–1	Rosenborg	Ålesund
18:00 CEST (UTC+2)	Boli (yellow card) 74'; Skagestad 90+1'; Gyasi (yellow card) 90+4'	Summary	Rashani 2'; Svensson (yellow card) 25'; Konradsen (yellow card) 59' (yellow-red card) 77'	Stadium: Color Line Stadion; Attendance: 6,525; Referee: Kai Erik Steen

22 July 2016 17	Brann	6–0	Aalesund	Bergen
19:00 CEST (UTC+2)	Acosta 23'; Skagestad 38' (o.g.); Nilsen 59'; Huseklepp 65' (pen.); Grønner (yellow card) 71'; Karadas 77', 85'	Summary	Grétarsson (red card) 65'	Stadium: Brann Stadion; Attendance: 10,348; Referee: Svein-Erik Edvartsen

31 July 2016 18	Aalesund	2–0	Lillestrøm	Ålesund
15:30 CEST (UTC+2)	Kirkeskov 49'; Boli 52'; Gyasi (yellow card) 65'	Summary		Stadium: Color Line Stadion; Attendance: 5,652; Referee: Tommy Skjerven

5 August 2016 19	Tromsø	1–2	Aalesund	Tromsø
18:30 CEST (UTC+2)	Espejord 14'	Summary	Antonsen 4'; Mos 20'; Þrándarson (yellow card) 44'; Boli (yellow card) 69'	Stadium: Alfheim Stadion; Attendance: 3,335; Referee: Dag Vidar Hafsås

14 August 2016 20	Aalesund	0–2	Molde	Ålesund
15:30 CEST (UTC+2)	Boli (yellow card) 52'; Riise (yellow card) 64'; Skagestad (yellow card) 81'	Summary	Brustad 42'; Hestad 55' (yellow card) 80'; Sigurðarson (yellow card) 89'	Stadium: Color Line Stadion; Attendance: 8,323; Referee: Tom Harald Hagen

21 August 2016 21	Stabæk	3–0	Aalesund	Bærum
18:00 CEST (UTC+2)	Grossman 16'; Keita 30' (yellow card) 76'; Granli (yellow card) 66'; Kassi 86'	Summary	Carlsen (yellow card) 51'; Riise (yellow card) 81' (yellow-red card) 83'; Fet (yellow card) 86'	Stadium: Nadderud Stadion; Attendance: 4,938; Referee: Trond Ivar Døvle

26 August 2016 22	Aalesund	2–2	Sarpsborg 08	Ålesund
19:00 CEST (UTC+2)	Fet 13'; Carlsen (yellow card) 77'; Boli 83'	Soccerway	Lindberg (yellow card) 9'; Mortensen 11'; Kirkevold 24'; Østli (yellow card) 45+1'; Østbø (yellow card) 78'	Stadium: Color Line Stadion; Attendance: 5,231; Referee: Espen Eskås

9 September 2016 23	Start	1–4	Aalesund	Kristiansand
19:00 CEST (UTC+2)	Antwi (yellow card) 8'; E.Segberg (yellow card) 11'; Nwakali 18'	Report	Wormgoor (yellow card) 27'; B.H.Riise 51'; Boli (yellow card) 58' (goal) 87'; Þrándarson 74'; Fet 76'	Stadium: Sør Arena; Attendance: 3,401; Referee: Tommy Skjerven

18 September 2016 24	Aalesund	4–2	Strømsgodset	Ålesund
18:00 CEST (UTC+2)	Gyasi 14'; Carlsen 50'; B. H. Riise 56' (yellow card) 73'; Mos 62'	Report	Tokstad 1' (penalty missed); Hamoud (yellow card) 50'; Vilsvik (yellow card) 56'; Ovenstad (yellow card) 60'; Pedersen 90' (pen.)	Stadium: Color Line Stadion; Attendance: 5,634; Referee: Dag Vidar Hafsås

25 September 2016 25	Vålerenga	0–1	Aalesund	Oslo
18:00 CEST (UTC+2)	Lindkvist (yellow card) 32'; Lundström (yellow card) 42'; Wæhler (yellow card) 45+2'	Report	Mos 1'; Hoff (yellow card) 30'; Carlsen (yellow card) 34'; Kirkeskov (yellow card) 71'; Lie (yellow card) 88'	Stadium: Ullevaal Stadion; Attendance: 6,845; Referee: Kim Andre Johnsen

2 October 2016 26	Aalesund	1–0	Odd	Ålesund
18:00 CEST (UTC+2)	Gyasi 85' (yellow card) 86'	Report	Jensen (yellow card) 83'	Stadium: Color Line Stadion; Attendance: 5,832; Referee: Kai Erik Steen

15 October 2016 27	Aalesund	1–0	Bodø/Glimt	Ålesund
15:30 CEST (UTC+2)	Wormgoor (yellow card) 48'; Saltnes 63' (o.g.)	Report	Mockenhaupt (yellow card) 15'; Normann (yellow card) 22'	Stadium: Color Line Stadion; Attendance: 6,007; Referee: Svein-Erik Edvartsen

21 October 2016 28	Viking	2–3	Aalesund	Stavanger
19:00 CEST (UTC+2)	Pedersen 26'; Mets (red card) 56'; Dawson (yellow card) 59'; Haugen (yellow card) 68'; Ibrahim (yellow card) 77'; U.Sale (yellow card) 86'; Bringaker 90'	Report	Mos 35', 57' (pen.) (yellow card) 90+4'; Kirkeskov 69'	Stadium: Viking Stadion; Attendance: 7,069; Referee: Kai Erik Steen

30 October 2016 29	Aalesund	3–3	Haugesund	Ålesund
18:00 CET (UTC+1)	Mos 28' (pen.), 57'; Larsen 72'; Wormgoor (yellow card) 90'	Report	Agdestein 21'; Skjerve 30'; Troost-Ekong (yellow card) 38'; Kiss (yellow card) 56'; Hajradinović 78'	Stadium: Color Line Stadion; Attendance: 7,095; Referee: Martin Lundby

6 November 2016 30	Sogndal	2–4	Aalesund	Sogndalsfjøra
18:00 CET (UTC+1)	Psyché 3'; Ramsland 17' (yellow card) 65'; Bolseth (yellow card) 51'; Patronen (yellow card) 78'	Summary	Abdellaoue 12'; Þrándarson 23'; Gyasi 35'; Kirkeskov (yellow card) 52'; Teniste 76' (o.g.); Arnarson (yellow card) 80'	Stadium: Fosshaugane Campus; Attendance: 2,864; Referee: Tom Harald Hagen

==== Table ====
Pos	Team	Pld	W	D	L	GF	GA	GD	Pts
7	Strømsgodset	30	12	8	10	44	40	+4	44
8	Viking	30	12	7	11	33	35	−2	43
9	Aalesund	30	12	6	12	46	51	−5	42
10	Vålerenga	30	10	8	12	41	39	+2	38
11	Sogndal	30	8	12	10	33	37	−4	36

Source: Football Association of Norway (in Norwegian), Soccerway
Rules for classification: 1) Points; 2) Goal difference; 3) Goals scored; 4) Head-to-head points; 5) Head-to-head goal difference; 6) Head-to-head away goals scored (between two teams).

=== Norwegian Cup ===
13 April 2016 First Round	Spjelkavik	0–1	Aalesund	Spjelkavik
18:00 CEST (UTC+2)	Stensøe (yellow card) 43'; B.Sunde (yellow card) 59'; E.Viddal (yellow card) 80'	Summary	J.Riise (yellow card) 32'; Abdellaoue 50' (pen.)	Stadium: Spjelkavik stadion Referee: Marius Hansen Grøtta

27 April 2016 Second Round	Herd	3–4 (a.e.t.)	Aalesund	Ålesund
18:00 CEST (UTC+2)	I. Kristjansson 6', 12', (yellow card) 89'; E. Dietrichson (yellow card) 69'; A. Rekdal 75', (yellow card) 84'; M. Sæther (yellow card) 85'; E. Sandvik (yellow card) 120'	Summary	Fet 40'; Mäntylä (yellow card) 67'; Arnarson (yellow card) 78'; J.A. Riise 87'; Mos 88', 103'	Stadium: Amfi Moa Stadion; Attendance: 1,600; Referee: Mathias Smehus Kringstad

3 May 2016 Third Round	Brattvåg	1–1 (a.e.t.) (5–4 p)	Aalesund	Brattvåg
19:00 CEST (UTC+2)	V.Sætre (yellow card) 55'; E.Høivik 92'; K.Strand (yellow card) 102'; P.Mambouana (yellow card) 113'	Summary	J.A.Riise (yellow card) 101'; Abdellaoue 116'	Stadium: Brattvåg Stadion; Attendance: 1,203; Referee: Steinar Hauge
	Penalties
	P.Mambouana (penalty scored); E.Høivik (penalty scored); R.Palacios (penalty scored); L.Nekrouf (penalty scored); K.Strand (penalty scored)		(penalty missed) O.Lie; (penalty scored) Kirkeskov; (penalty scored) B.H.Riise; (penalty scored) J.A.Riise; (penalty scored) Abdellaoue

== Squad statistics ==
As of match played 6 November 2016

=== Appearances and goals ===
No.	Pos	Nat	Player	Total		Tippeligaen		Norwegian Cup	
No.	Pos	Nat	Player	Apps	Goals	Apps	Goals	Apps	Goals
1	GK	(Norway) NOR	Andreas Lie	29	0	28	0	1	0
2	DF	(Denmark) DEN	Mikkel Kirkeskov	32	2	29	2	3	0
3	DF	(Iceland) ISL	Daníel Leó Grétarsson	14	0	7+5	0	2	0
4	DF	(Finland) FIN	Tero Mäntylä	4	0	0+3	0	1	0
5	DF	(Norway) NOR	Oddbjørn Lie	27	1	25+1	1	1	0
6	DF	(Netherlands) NED	Vito Wormgoor	11	0	10+1	0	0	0
7	FW	(Ivory Coast) CIV	Franck Boli	29	6	26+1	6	1+1	0
8	MF	(Norway) NOR	Fredrik Carlsen	24	1	19+5	1	0	0
10	MF	(Norway) NOR	Peter Orry Larsen	27	4	22+3	4	2	0
11	MF	(Iceland) ISL	Aron Elís Þrándarson	31	3	23+6	3	1+1	0
14	MF	(Netherlands) NED	Edwin Gyasi	28	6	18+8	6	2	0
15	MF	(Brazil) BRA	Marlinho	15	0	1+11	0	2+1	0
18	MF	(Norway) NOR	Vebjørn Hoff	29	1	20+7	1	1+1	0
19	FW	(Kosovo) KOS	Flamur Kastrati	3	0	2+1	0	0	0
21	MF	(Norway) NOR	Bjørn Helge Riise	27	2	24	2	2+1	0
22	DF	(Iceland) ISL	Adam Örn Arnarson	28	0	24+2	0	2	0
23	DF	(Norway) NOR	Edvard Skagestad	26	2	19+5	2	2	0
24	GK	(Norway) NOR	Lars Cramer	4	0	2	0	2	0
30	FW	(Norway) NOR	Mustafa Abdellaoue	32	17	22+7	13	2+1	4
40	MF	(Norway) NOR	Sondre Brunstad Fet	19	3	2+14	2	1+2	1
Players away from Aalesunds on loan:
Players who appeared for Aalesunds no longer at the club:
6	DF	(Norway) NOR	John Arne Riise	13	1	7+3	0	3	1
20	MF	(Norway) NOR	Thomas Martinussen	3	0	0+1	0	2	0

=== Goal scorers ===
Place	Position	Nation	Number	Name	Tippeligaen	Norwegian Cup	Total
1	FW	(Norway)	30	Mustafa Abdellaoue	13	4	17
2	FW	(Ivory Coast)	7	Franck Boli	6	0	6
2	MF	(Netherlands)	14	Edwin Gyasi	6	0	6
4	MF	(Norway)	10	Peter Orry Larsen	4	0	4
5	MF	(Iceland)	11	Aron Elís Þrándarson	3	0	3
5	MF	(Norway)	40	Sondre Brunstad Fet	2	1	3
7	DF	(Norway)	23	Edvard Skagestad	2	0	2
7	MF	(Norway)	21	Bjørn Helge Riise	2	0	2
7	DF	(Denmark)	2	Mikkel Kirkeskov	2	0	2
7				Own goal	2	0	2
11	MF	(Norway)	8	Fredrik Carlsen	1	0	1
11	MF	(Norway)	18	Vebjørn Hoff	1	0	1
11	DF	(Norway)	5	Oddbjørn Lie	1	0	1
11	DF	(Norway)	6	John Arne Riise	0	1	1
				TOTALS	45	6	51

=== Disciplinary record ===
Number	Nation	Position	Name	Tippeligaen		Norwegian Cup		Total	
Number	Nation	Position	Name	Yellow card	Red card	Yellow card	Red card	Yellow card	Red card
1	(Norway)	GK	Andreas Lie	2	0	0	0	2	0
2	(Denmark)	DF	Mikkel Kirkeskov	4	0	0	0	4	0
3	(Iceland)	DF	Daníel Leó Grétarsson	0	1	0	0	0	1
4	(Finland)	DF	Tero Mäntylä	0	0	1	0	1	0
5	(Norway)	DF	Oddbjørn Lie	2	0	0	0	2	0
6	(Norway)	DF	John Arne Riise	0	0	2	0	2	0
6	(Netherlands)	DF	Vito Wormgoor	3	0	0	0	3	0
7	(Ivory Coast)	FW	Franck Boli	6	0	0	0	6	0
8	(Norway)	MF	Fredrik Carlsen	6	0	0	0	6	0
10	(Norway)	MF	Peter Orry Larsen	2	0	0	0	2	0
11	(Iceland)	MF	Aron Elís Þrándarson	2	0	0	0	2	0
14	(Netherlands)	MF	Edwin Gyasi	5	0	0	0	5	0
18	(Norway)	MF	Vebjørn Hoff	2	0	0	0	2	0
21	(Norway)	MF	Bjørn Helge Riise	9	1	0	0	9	1
22	(Iceland)	DF	Adam Örn Arnarson	5	1	1	0	6	1
23	(Norway)	DF	Edvard Skagestad	1	0	0	0	1	0
30	(Norway)	FW	Mustafa Abdellaoue	1	0	0	0	1	0
40	(Norway)	MF	Sondre Brunstad Fet	1	0	0	0	1	0
			TOTALS	51	3	4	0	55	3
