= 2017 Aalesunds FK season =

Aalesund
2017 season
- Chairman: Kjell Tennfjord
- Manager: Trond Fredriksen
- Stadium: Color Line Stadion
- Tippeligaen: 15th
- Norwegian Cup: Fourth Round vs Stabæk
- Top goalscorer: League: Mustafa Abdellaoue (16); All: Mustafa Abdellaoue (18)

The 2017 season is Aalesund's tenth consecutive season in the Tippeligaen.

== Squad ==
As of 21 August 2017

Note: Flags indicate national team as defined under FIFA eligibility rules; some limited exceptions apply. Players may hold more than one non-FIFA nationality.

No.	Pos.	Nation	Player
1	GK	NOR	Andreas Lie
2	DF	DEN	Mikkel Kirkeskov
3	DF	ISL	Daníel Leó Grétarsson
5	DF	NOR	Oddbjørn Lie
6	DF	NED	Kaj Ramsteijn
8	MF	NOR	Fredrik Carlsen
9	FW	SWE	Valmir Berisha
10	FW	GRE	Thanasis Papazoglou (loan from Kortrijk)
11	MF	ISL	Aron Elís Þrándarson
14	FW	GHA	Edwin Gyasi
15	MF	BRA	Marlinho
17	MF	NOR	Sondre Brunstad Fet

No.	Pos.	Nation	Player
18	MF	NOR	Vebjørn Hoff
21	MF	NOR	Bjørn Helge Riise
22	DF	ISL	Adam Örn Arnarson
25	GK	NOR	Jan-Lennart Urke
30	FW	NOR	Mustafa Abdellaoue
32	GK	NOR	Sondre Sødergren
33	DF	NOR	Anders Waagan
36	MF	NOR	Emil Solnørdal
37	DF	NOR	Joakim Barstad
38	MF	NOR	Jørgen Hatlehol
41	MF	NOR	Markus Karlsbakk

== Transfers ==
=== Winter ===
In: Note: Flags indicate national team as defined under FIFA eligibility rules; some limited exceptions apply. Players may hold more than one non-FIFA nationality.

No.	Pos.	Nation	Player
6	DF	NED	Kaj Ramsteijn (from (Netherlands) Almere City)
9	FW	SWE	Valmir Berisha (from (Netherlands) Cambuur)
10	FW	RSA	Lars Veldwijk (loan from (Belgium) Kortrijk)
23	GK	NOR	Pål Vestly Heigre (from (Norway) Viking)

Out: Note: Flags indicate national team as defined under FIFA eligibility rules; some limited exceptions apply. Players may hold more than one non-FIFA nationality.

No.	Pos.	Nation	Player
6	DF	NED	Vito Wormgoor (to (Norway) Brann)
7	FW	CIV	Franck Boli (loan return to (China) Liaoning Whowin)
10	MF	NOR	Peter Orry Larsen (to (Norway) Brann)
19	FW	KOS	Flamur Kastrati (to (Norway) Sandefjord)
23	DF	NOR	Edvard Skagestad (to (Norway) Fredrikstad)
24	GK	NOR	Lars Cramer (retired)

=== Summer ===
In: Note: Flags indicate national team as defined under FIFA eligibility rules; some limited exceptions apply. Players may hold more than one non-FIFA nationality.

No.	Pos.	Nation	Player
10	FW	GRE	Thanasis Papazoglou (on loan from (Belgium) Kortrijk)
25	GK	NOR	Jan-Lennart Urke (from (Norway) Hødd)

Out: Note: Flags indicate national team as defined under FIFA eligibility rules; some limited exceptions apply. Players may hold more than one non-FIFA nationality.

No.	Pos.	Nation	Player
4	DF	FIN	Tero Mäntylä
10	FW	RSA	Lars Veldwijk (loan return to (Belgium) Kortrijk)
23	GK	NOR	Pål Vestly Heigre (to (Norway) Strømsgodset)

== Competitions ==
=== Tippeligaen ===
==== Results summary ====
Overall								Home						Away					
Pld	W	D	L	GF	GA	GD	Pts	W	D	L	GF	GA	GD	W	D	L	GF	GA	GD
30	8	8	14	36	48	−12	32	6	4	5	24	20	+4	2	4	9	12	28	−16

Last updated: 26 November 2017.
Source: see below

==== Results by round ====
Round	1	2	3	4	5	6	7	8	9	10	11	12	13	14	15	16	17	18	19	20	21	22	23	24	25	26	27	28	29	30
Ground	A	H	A	H	A	H	A	H	A	H	A	H	A	H	A	H	A	H	H	A	H	A	H	A	A	H	A	H	A	H
Result	L	L	D	W	D	W	W	L	W	W	D	L	D	W	L	L	L	D	D	L	D	L	L	L	L	D	L	W	L	W
Position	13	15	15	11	12	8	8	9	6	6	6	5	6	4	5	6	8	9	10	11	11	11	14	14	14	14	15	14	14	15

Updated to match(es) played on 26 November 2017. Source: see below
A = Away; H = Home; W = Win; D = Draw; L = Loss

==== Results ====
2 April 2017 1	Stabæk	3–1	Aalesund	Bærum
18:00 CEST (UTC+2)	Ba (yellow card) 7'; Omoijuanfo 14', 20', 50' (yellow card) 14'	Report	Ramsteijn (yellow card) 59'; Abdellaoue 65'	Stadium: Nadderud Stadion; Referee: Kai Erik Steen

5 April 2017 2	Aalesund	1–3	Sarpsborg 08	Ålesund
19:00 CEST (UTC+2)	Carlsen 19'; Hoff (yellow card) 85'	Report	Mortensen 9', 21'; Nielsen (yellow card) 32'; Jørgensen 45+1'; Albech (yellow card) 51'	Stadium: Color Line Stadion; Attendance: 5,363; Referee: Trygve Kjensli

9 April 2017 3	Strømsgodset	1–1	Aalesund	Drammen
20:00 CEST (UTC+2)	Jradi (yellow card) 27'; Tagbajumi 44'; Hauger (yellow card) 61'	Report	Abdellaoue 17'	Stadium: Marienlyst Stadion; Referee: Dag Vidar Hafsås

17 April 2017 4	Aalesund	3–1	Lillestrøm	Ålesund
18:00 CEST (UTC+2)	Grétarsson 5'; Veldwijk 45'; Abdellaoue 48'	Report	Amundsen (yellow card) 22'; Knudtzon (yellow card) 62'; Malec 72'	Stadium: Color Line Stadion; Attendance: 5,370; Referee: Ola Hobber Nilsen

23 April 2017 5	Rosenborg	0–0	Aalesund	Trondheim
18:00 CEST (UTC+2)	Meling (yellow card) 68'; Midtsjø (yellow card) 88'; Konradsen (yellow card) 90'	Report	Kirkeskov (yellow card) 45'; Berisha (yellow card) 84'; Arnarson (yellow card) 84'; Ramsteijn (yellow card) 86'; Solnørdal (yellow card) 90'; Mos (yellow card) 90'	Stadium: Lerkendal Stadion; Attendance: 16,948; Referee: Trond Ivar Døvle

30 April 2017 6	Aalesund	3–1	Tromsø	Ålesund
18:00 CEST (UTC+2)	Abdellaoue (yellow card) 18' (goal) 67'; Riise 61'; Hoff 80'	Report	Åsen (yellow card) 19'; Ingebrigtsen 21' (yellow card) 29'; Kpozo (yellow card) 47'	Stadium: Color Line Stadion; Attendance: 5,562; Referee: Kristoffer Hagenes

6 May 2017 7	Molde	0–1	Aalesund	Molde
18:00 CEST (UTC+2)	Hussain (yellow card) 38'	Report	Abdellaoue 45'; Ramsteijn (yellow card) 59'	Stadium: Aker Stadion; Attendance: 9,488; Referee: Trond Ivar Døvle

12 May 2017 8	Aalesund	0–1	Vålerenga	Ålesund
19:00 CEST (UTC+2)	Ramsteijn (yellow card) 78'	Report	Stengel 39' (yellow card) 60'; Lekven (yellow card) 41'; Näsberg (yellow card) 66'	Stadium: Color Line Stadion; Referee: Dag Vidar Hafsås

16 May 2017 9	Viking	1–2	Aalesund	Stavanger
18:00 CEST (UTC+2)	Hoff 11' (o.g.)	Report	Abdellaoue 28' (pen.); Veldwijk (yellow card) 30'; Gyasi 87'; A.Lie (yellow card) 90+3'	Stadium: Viking Stadion; Attendance: 8,431; Referee: Ola Hobber Nilsen

21 May 2017 10	Aalesund	2–0	Sandefjord	Ålesund
18:00 CEST (UTC+2)	Abdellaoue 9' (pen.); Gyasi 26'	Report	Hansen (yellow card) 21'; Morer (yellow card) 70'; Kastrati (yellow card) 90+4'	Stadium: Color Line Stadion; Attendance: 5,284; Referee: Rohit Saggi

28 May 2017 11	Brann	1–1	Aalesund	Bergen
18:00 CEST (UTC+2)	Ramsteijn 34' (o.g.); Nilsen (yellow card) 40' (yellow-red card) 83'; Braaten (yellow card) 52'	Report	A.Lie (yellow card) 40'; Gyasi 81'	Stadium: Brann Stadion; Attendance: 12,019; Referee: Ola Hobber Nilsen

4 June 2017 12	Aalesund	0–1	Haugesund	Ålesund
18:00 CEST (UTC+2)	Marlinho (yellow card) 49'	Report	Ibrahim 9' (yellow card) 59'; Skjerve (yellow card) 35'	Stadium: Color Line Stadion; Attendance: 5,764; Referee: Kai Erik Steen

17 June 2017 13	Kristiansund	1–1	Aalesund	Kristiansund
18:00 CEST (UTC+2)	Stokke 60'; Aasbak (yellow card) 62'; Bamba (yellow card) 81'	Report	Veldwijk 21'; Arnarson (yellow card) 71'	Stadium: Atlanten Stadion; Attendance: 4,033; Referee: Tommy Skjerven

25 June 2017 14	Aalesund	5–1	Odd	Ålesund
18:00 CEST (UTC+2)	Veldwijk 11', 64', 74'; Berge 18' (o.g.); Abdellaoue 33' (pen.); Grétarsson (yellow card) 56'	Report	Nordkvelle (yellow card) 11'; Berge (red card) 32'; Riski (yellow card) 37'; Zekhnini 42'; Samuelsen (yellow card) 59'	Stadium: Color Line Stadion; Attendance: 5,537; Referee: Trygve Kjensli

1 July 2017 15	Sogndal	1–0	Aalesund	Sogndalsfjøra
20:15 CEST (UTC+2)	Nwakali 2' (red card) 83'; Koomson (yellow card) 55'	Report	Arnarson (yellow card) 77'	Stadium: Fosshaugane Campus; Attendance: 5,089; Referee: Trond Ivar Døvle

8 July 2017 16	Aalesund	0–3	Molde	Ålesund
18:00 CEST (UTC+2)	Lie (yellow card) 57'	Report	Sigurðarson 22', 57' (pen.); Brustad 75'	Stadium: Color Line Stadion; Attendance: 9,062; Referee: Svein Oddvar Moen

16 July 2017 17	Haugesund	2–0	Aalesund	Haugesund
18:00 CEST (UTC+2)	Skjerve (yellow card) 21'; Ibrahim 55'; Andreassen 84'	Report	Carlsen (yellow card) 38'; Gyasi (yellow card) 68'; Ramsteijn (yellow card) 90+2'	Stadium: Haugesund Stadion; Attendance: 3,831; Referee: Espen Eskås

6 August 2017 18	Aalesund	3–3	Brann	Ålesund
20:00 CEST (UTC+2)	Hoff (yellow card) 18'; Papazoglou 36' (pen.); Kirkeskov (yellow card) 62'; Ramsteijn (yellow card) 71'; Abdellaoue 82' (pen.), 90+2'	Report	Orlov 10'; Barmen 12', 69'; Grønner (yellow card) 53'; Karadas (yellow card) 90+4'	Stadium: Color Line Stadion; Attendance: 5,736; Referee: Trygve Kjensli

13 August 2017 19	Aalesund	1–1	Viking	Ålesund
18:00 CEST (UTC+2)	Grétarsson (yellow card) 80'; Riise (yellow card) 88'; Papazoglou 90+3'	Report	Høiland 12'; Jenkins (yellow card) 31'; Martinsen (yellow card) 51'; Adegbenro (yellow card) 56'	Stadium: Color Line Stadion; Attendance: 5,480; Referee: Kristoffer Hagenes

20 August 2017 20	Tromsø	3–2	Aalesund	Tromsø
18:00 CEST (UTC+2)	Åsen 6'; Landu Landu (yellow card) 39'; Wangberg (yellow card) 45+1'; Olsen 48', 75'; Nilsen (yellow card) 90+4'	Report	Papazoglou 20'; Kirkeskov (yellow card) 26' (yellow-red card) 63'; Ramsteijn (yellow card) 35'; Riise (yellow card) 53'; Þrándarson 54'; Grétarsson (yellow card) 90+5'	Stadium: Alfheim Stadion; Attendance: 3,938; Referee: Kai Erik Steen

10 September 2017 21	Aalesund	1–1	Stabæk	Ålesund
18:00 CEST (UTC+2)	Abdellaoue 79' (pen.)	Report	Omoijuanfo 37' (yellow card) 78'; Lumanza (yellow card) 70'	Stadium: Color Line Stadion; Attendance: 5,228; Referee: Rohit Saggi

18 September 2017 22	Odds	3–2	Aalesund	Skien
19:00 CEST (UTC+2)	Samuelsen 5' (pen.) (yellow card) 57'; Grétarsson 20' (o.g.); Rashani 47' (yellow card) 61'	Report	Abdellaoue 62' (pen.); Carlsen (yellow card) 63'; Berge 68' (o.g.); Riise (yellow card) 69' Papazoglou (yellow card) 74'; Ramsteijn (yellow card) 85'	Stadium: Skagerak Arena; Referee: Espen Eskås

24 September 2017 23	Aalesund	0–1	Sogndal	Ålesund
18:00 CEST (UTC+2)	Hatlehol (yellow card) 86'	Report	Schulze 34' (yellow card) 57'; Ramsland (yellow card) 65'	Stadium: Color Line Stadion; Attendance: 5,178; Referee: Martin Lundby

1 October 2017 24	Sandefjord	2–0	Aalesund	Sandefjord
18:00 CEST (UTC+2)	Solberg (yellow card) 45'; Grossmüller 68'; Sødlund 81'; Rodriguez (yellow card) 86'	Report	Marlinho (yellow card) 35'	Stadium: Komplett Arena; Attendance: 3,426; Referee: Trygve Kjensli

15 October 2017 25	Vålerenga	5–1	Aalesund	Oslo
18:00 CEST (UTC+2)	Näsberg 5'; Ejuke 7', 29'; Tollås (yellow card) 11'; Juklerød 66'; Johansen 70'	Report	Gyasi 22'	Stadium: Intility Arena; Attendance: 8,932; Referee: Tom Harald Hagen

21 October 2017 26	Aalesund	1–1	Kristiansund	Ålesund
18:00 CEST (UTC+2)	Papazoglou (yellow card) 41'; Arnarson (yellow card) 89'; Hoff 90+4'	Report	Diop (yellow card) 58' (yellow-red card) 68'; Gjertsen 86'	Stadium: Color Line Stadion; Attendance: 7,347; Referee: Dag Vidar Hafsås

30 October 2017 27	Lillestrøm	4–0	Aalesund	Lillestrøm
19:00 CEST (UTC+2)	Kippe 24'; Mathew (yellow card) 49' (goal) 77'; Brenden 67'; Knudtzon 83'	Report	Hoff (yellow card) 11'; Grétarsson (yellow card) 26'; O.Lie (yellow card) 64'	Stadium: Åråsen Stadion; Attendance: 4,357; Referee: Tore Hansen

5 November 2017 28	Aalesund	2–1	Rosenborg	Ålesund
20:00 CEST (UTC+2)	Þrándarson (yellow card) 55'; A.Lie (yellow card) 56'; Gyasi (yellow card) 57'; Abdellaoue 68'; Gyasi 75'	Report	Bendtner 55'; Jevtović (yellow card) 67'	Stadium: Color Line Stadion; Attendance: 6,105; Referee: Svein Oddvar Moen

19 November 2017 29	Sarpsborg 08	1–0	Aalesund	Sarpsborg
18:00 CEST (UTC+2)	Mortensen 48'; Jørgensen (yellow card) 63'	Report	O.Lie (yellow card) 45+1'; Ramsteijn (yellow card) 60' (yellow-red card) 70'	Stadium: Sarpsborg Stadion; Attendance: 4,600; Referee: Martin Lundby

26 November 2017 30	Aalesund	4–3	Strømsgodset	Ålesund
18:00 CEST (UTC+2)	Abdellaoue 12', 89', 90+2'; Þrándarson (yellow card) 38'; Papazoglou (yellow card) 45+2'; Gyasi 54' (yellow card) 74'; Grétarsson (yellow card) 78'; Carlsen (yellow card) 82'	Report	Jradi 39' (yellow card) 74'; Nguen 81'; Pedersen 89'	Stadium: Color Line Stadion; Attendance: 6,421; Referee: Kai Erik Steen

==== Table ====
Pos	Team	Pld	W	D	L	GF	GA	GD	Pts	Qualification or relegation
12	Lillestrøm	30	10	7	13	40	43	−3	37	Qualification for the Europa League second qualifying round (Note: Lillestrøm qualified for the Europa League second qualifying round as winners of the 2017 Norwegian Cup.)
13	Sandefjord	30	11	3	16	38	51	−13	36	
14	Sogndal (R)	30	8	8	14	38	48	−10	32	Qualification for the relegation play-offs
15	Aalesund (R)	30	8	8	14	38	50	−12	32	Relegation to First Division
16	Viking (R)	30	6	6	18	33	57	−24	24	Relegation to First Division

Source: Football Association of Norway (in Norwegian), Soccerway
Rules for classification: 1) Points; 2) Goal difference; 3) Goals scored; 4) Head-to-head points; 5) Head-to-head goal difference; 6) Head-to-head away goals scored (only if between two teams); 7) Head-to-head goals scored; 8) Play-off (only used to decide champions or relegation).
(R) Relegated

=== Norwegian Cup ===
26 April 2017 First Round	Herd	3–5 (a.e.t.)	Aalesund	Ålesund
18:00 CEST (UTC+2)	C.Rekdal 9'; B.Mathiesen (yellow card) 26' (goal) 43'; H.Hagen (yellow card) 35'; A.Rekdal (yellow card) 88'; I.Kristjansson 112' (pen.)	Report	Abdellaoue 56', 101'; Fet 65' (yellow card) 98'; Carlsen (yellow card) 67'; Kirkeskov (yellow card) 83'; Mäntylä 93'; Veldwijk 120'	Stadium: Amfi Moa Stadion; Attendance: 1,100; Referee: Thomas Solum Lystad

24 May 2017 Second Round	Byåsen	0–2	Aalesund	Trondheim
18:00 CEST (UTC+2)		Report	Ramsteijn (yellow card) 26'; Berisha 36' (yellow card) 90+2'; Veldwijk 86'	Stadium: Byåsen Arena; Attendance: 215; Referee: Kent Ove Gomo Hammer

31 May 2017 Third Round	Kjelsås	0–1	Aalesund	Oslo
18:30 CEST (UTC+2)		Report	Marlinho 11'; Kirkeskov (yellow card) 16'; Arnarson (yellow card) 54'	Stadium: Grefsen Stadion; Attendance: 865; Referee: Sivert Amland

10 August 2017 Fourth Round	Stabæk	3–0	Aalesund	Bærum
18:00 CEST (UTC+2)	Gyasi 20'; Lumanza 41'; Brochmann 47'	Report	Ramsteijn (yellow card) 63'	Stadium: Nadderud Stadion; Attendance: 1,820; Referee: Trond Ivar Døvle

== Squad statistics ==
As of match played 26 November 2017

=== Appearances and goals ===
No.	Pos	Nat	Player	Total		Tippeligaen		Norwegian Cup	
No.	Pos	Nat	Player	Apps	Goals	Apps	Goals	Apps	Goals
1	GK	(Norway) NOR	Andreas Lie	30	0	29	0	1	0
2	DF	(Denmark) DEN	Mikkel Kirkeskov	31	0	28	0	3	0
3	DF	(Iceland) ISL	Daníel Leó Grétarsson	31	1	25+2	1	2+2	0
5	DF	(Norway) NOR	Oddbjørn Lie	30	0	15+11	0	4	0
6	DF	(Netherlands) NED	Kaj Ramsteijn	30	0	26	0	4	0
8	MF	(Norway) NOR	Fredrik Carlsen	31	1	25+2	1	3+1	0
9	FW	(Sweden) SWE	Valmir Berisha	26	1	2+20	0	2+2	1
10	FW	(Greece) GRE	Thanasis Papazoglou	13	3	12	3	1	0
11	MF	(Iceland) ISL	Aron Elís Þrándarson	27	1	18+6	1	1+2	0
14	FW	(Ghana) GHA	Edwin Gyasi	29	6	23+4	6	2	0
15	MF	(Brazil) BRA	Marlinho	12	1	6+4	0	2	1
17	MF	(Norway) NOR	Sondre Brunstad Fet	29	1	15+11	0	2+1	1
18	MF	(Norway) NOR	Vebjørn Hoff	31	2	24+3	2	4	0
21	MF	(Norway) NOR	Bjørn Helge Riise	17	1	14+2	1	0+1	0
22	MF	(Iceland) ISL	Adam Örn Arnarson	25	0	20+1	0	4	0
23	GK	(Norway) NOR	Pål Vestly Heigre	4	0	1	0	3	0
30	FW	(Norway) NOR	Mustafa Abdellaoue	33	18	28+2	16	3	2
33	DF	(Norway) NOR	Anders Waagan	1	0	0+1	0	0	0
36	MF	(Norway) NOR	Emil Solnørdal	1	0	0+1	0	0	0
37	DF	(Norway) NOR	Joakim Barstad	1	0	0+1	0	0	0
38	MF	(Norway) NOR	Jørgen Hatlehol	11	0	5+5	0	1	0
41	MF	(Norway) NOR	Markus Karlsbakk	1	0	0+1	0	0	0
Players away from Aalesunds on loan:
Players who left Aalesunds during the season:
4	DF	(Finland) FIN	Tero Mäntylä	2	1	0	0	0+2	1
10	FW	(South Africa) RSA	Lars Veldwijk	19	7	14+2	5	2+1	2

=== Goal scorers ===
Place	Position	Nation	Number	Name	Tippeligaen	Norwegian Cup	Total	
1	FW	(Norway)	30	Mustafa Abdellaoue	16	2	18	
2	FW	(South Africa)	10	Lars Veldwijk	5	2	7	
3	MF	(Ghana)	14	Edwin Gyasi	6	0	6	
4	FW	(Greece)	10	Thanasis Papazoglou	3	0	3	
5				Own goal	2	0	2	
5	MF	(Norway)	18	Vebjørn Hoff	2	0	2	
7	MF	(Norway)	8	Fredrik Carlsen	1	0	1	
7	DF	(Iceland)	3	Daníel Leó Grétarsson	1	0	1	
7	MF	(Norway)	21	Bjørn Helge Riise	1	0	1	
7	MF	(Iceland)	11	Aron Elís Þrándarson	1	0	1	
7	MF	(Norway)	17	Sondre Brunstad Fet	0	1	1	
7	DF	(Finland)	4	Tero Mäntylä	0	1	1	
7	FW	(Sweden)	9	Valmir Berisha	0	1	1	
7	MF	(Brazil)	15	Marlinho	0	1	1	
7					TOTALS	38	8	46

=== Disciplinary record ===
Number	Nation	Position	Name	Tippeligaen		Norwegian Cup		Total	
Number	Nation	Position	Name	Yellow card	Red card	Yellow card	Red card	Yellow card	Red card
1	(Norway)	GK	Andreas Lie	4	0	0	0	4	0
2	(Denmark)	DF	Mikkel Kirkeskov	4	1	2	0	6	1
3	(Iceland)	DF	Daníel Leó Grétarsson	5	0	0	0	5	0
5	(Norway)	DF	Oddbjørn Lie	4	0	0	0	4	0
6	(Netherlands)	DF	Kaj Ramsteijn	10	1	2	0	12	1
8	(Norway)	MF	Fredrik Carlsen	3	0	1	0	4	0
9	(Sweden)	FW	Valmir Berisha	1	0	1	0	2	0
10	(South Africa)	MF	Lars Veldwijk	1	0	0	0	1	0
10	(Greece)	FW	Thanasis Papazoglou	3	0	0	0	3	0
11	(Iceland)	MF	Aron Elís Þrándarson	1	0	0	0	1	0
14	(Ghana)	FW	Edwin Gyasi	3	0	0	0	3	0
15	(Brazil)	MF	Marlinho	2	0	0	0	2	0
17	(Norway)	MF	Sondre Brunstad Fet	0	0	1	0	1	0
18	(Norway)	MF	Vebjørn Hoff	3	0	0	0	3	0
21	(Norway)	MF	Bjørn Helge Riise	3	0	0	0	3	0
22	(Iceland)	DF	Adam Örn Arnarson	5	0	1	0	6	0
30	(Norway)	FW	Mustafa Abdellaoue	2	0	0	0	2	0
36	(Norway)	MF	Emil Solnørdal	1	0	0	0	1	0
38	(Norway)	DF	Jørgen Hatlehol	1	0	0	0	1	0
			TOTALS	53	2	9	0	62	2
