= 2015 Aalesunds FK season =

Aalesund
2015 season
- Chairman: Kjell Tennfjord
- Manager: Harald Aabrekk (until 28 April); Trond Fredriksen (interim) (from 28 April)
- Stadium: Color Line Stadion
- Tippeligaen: 10th
- Norwegian Cup: Third Round vs Hødd
- Top goalscorer: League: Leke James (13); All: Leke James (15)
- Highest home attendance: 7,365 vs Haugesund (12 April 2015)
- Lowest home attendance: 5,655 vs Tromsø (26 April 2015)

The 2015 season was Aalesund's ninth consecutive season in the Tippeligaen. They finished the season in 10th position, whilst also reaching the Third Round of the Norwegian Cup, where they were defeated by Hødd.

Aalesunds started the season with new manager Harald Aabrekk, but on 28 April, Aabrekk was sacked and replaced by Trond Fredriksen.

== Squad ==
As of 19 August 2015

Note: Flags indicate national team as defined under FIFA eligibility rules; some limited exceptions apply. Players may hold more than one non-FIFA nationality.

No.	Pos.	Nation	Player
1	GK	NOR	Andreas Lie
2	DF	NGR	Akeem Latifu
3	DF	ISL	Daníel Leó Grétarsson
4	DF	FIN	Tero Mäntylä
5	DF	NOR	Oddbjørn Lie
6	DF	SWE	Mikael Dyrestam
8	MF	NOR	Fredrik Carlsen
9	FW	SWE	Carl Björk
10	MF	NOR	Peter Orry Larsen
11	MF	ISL	Aron Elís Þrándarson
13	GK	NOR	Sten Grytebust
14	MF	NGR	Leke James

No.	Pos.	Nation	Player
15	MF	BRA	Marlinho
16	MF	NOR	Magne Hoseth
17	MF	NOR	Henrik Rørvik Bjørdal
20	DF	NOR	Thomas Martinussen
21	MF	NOR	Bjørn Helge Riise
22	DF	NOR	Jo Nymo Matland
23	DF	NOR	Edvard Skagestad
24	GK	NOR	Helge Sandvik (on loan from Vard Haugesund)
30	FW	NOR	Mustafa Abdellaoue
33	MF	NOR	Elias Dahlberg
39	MF	NOR	Vebjørn Hoff
40	FW	NOR	Sondre Fet

=== Out on loan ===
Note: Flags indicate national team as defined under FIFA eligibility rules; some limited exceptions apply. Players may hold more than one non-FIFA nationality.

No.	Pos.	Nation	Player
37	FW	NOR	Torbjørn Grytten (at Brattvåg)

== Transfers ==
=== Winter ===
In: Note: Flags indicate national team as defined under FIFA eligibility rules; some limited exceptions apply. Players may hold more than one non-FIFA nationality.

No.	Pos.	Nation	Player
3	DF	ISL	Daníel Leó Grétarsson (from (Iceland) Grindavik)
4	DF	FIN	Tero Mäntylä (from (Bulgaria) Ludogorets)
9	FW	SWE	Carl Björk (from (Norway) Brattvåg)
11	MF	ISL	Aron Elís Þrándarson (from (Iceland) Víkingur)
23	DF	NOR	Edvard Skagestad (from (Sweden) Norrköping)
24	GK	NOR	Helge Sandvik (on loan from (Norway) Vard Haugesund)

Out: Note: Flags indicate national team as defined under FIFA eligibility rules; some limited exceptions apply. Players may hold more than one non-FIFA nationality.

No.	Pos.	Nation	Player
4	DF	NOR	Jonatan Tollås Nation (to (Norway) Vålerenga)
15	DF	SWE	Daniel Arnefjord
16	DF	NOR	Hugues Wembangomo
17	DF	JAM	Demar Phillips (to (United States) Real Salt Lake)
18	FW	NOR	Christian Myklebust
19	FW	NOR	Tor Hogne Aarøy
23	MF	NOR	Fredrik Ulvestad (to (England) Burnley)
24	MF	MAR	El Mehdi Karnass (to (Morocco) FAR Rabat)

=== Summer ===
In: Note: Flags indicate national team as defined under FIFA eligibility rules; some limited exceptions apply. Players may hold more than one non-FIFA nationality.

No.	Pos.	Nation	Player
15	FW	BRA	Marlinho (from (Brazil) Duque de Caxias)
16	MF	NOR	Magne Hoseth (from (Norway) Viking)
21	MF	NOR	Bjørn Helge Riise (from (Norway) Lillestrøm)
24	GK	NOR	Helge Sandvik (on loan from (Norway) Vard Haugesund)

Out: Note: Flags indicate national team as defined under FIFA eligibility rules; some limited exceptions apply. Players may hold more than one non-FIFA nationality.

No.	Pos.	Nation	Player
7	MF	FIN	Sakari Mattila (to (England) Fulham)
24	GK	NOR	Helge Sandvik (loan return to (Norway) Vard Haugesund)
31	MF	CRC	Michael Barrantes (to (China) Shanghai Shenxin)
37	FW	NOR	Torbjørn Grytten (on loan to (Norway) Brattvåg)

== Friendlies ==
30 January 2015	Aalesund	4–0	Florø	Ålesund
CET (UTC+1)	Þrándarson (pen.); Bjørdal; Fet; Grétarsson	Summary		Stadium: Color Line Stadion

6 February 2015	Aalesund	1–3	Ranheim	Ålesund
CET (UTC+1)	Larsen	Summary	Goal	Stadium: Color Line Stadion

13 February 2015	Aalesund	3–1	Kristiansund	Ålesund
CET (UTC+1)	Þrándarson 31'; Fet 77'; Larsen 90+'	Summary	Berg; Lund (red card)	Stadium: Color Line Stadion

19 February 2015 La Manga Cup	Aalesund	2–0	Tromsø	La Manga, Spain
CET (UTC+1)	Barrantes 33'; Björk 82'	Summary		Stadium: La Manga Stadium

23 February 2015 La Manga Cup	Aalesund	2–2	Start	La Manga, Spain
18:00 CET (UTC+1)	Abdellaoue; Bjørdal 69'	Summary	Kristjánsson (yellow card) (yellow-red card); Sandnes; Vilhjálmsson 56'	Stadium: La Manga Stadium

5 March 2015	Bodø/Glimt	2–1	Aalesund	Bodø
18:00 CET (UTC+1)	Berglann 15', 27'	Summary	Bjørdal 26'	Stadium: Aspmyra Stadion

13 March 2015	Aalesund	2–1	Brann	Ålesund
17:00 CET (UTC+1)		Summary		Stadium: Color Line Stadion

20 March 2015	Hødd	2–1	Aalesund	Ulsteinvik
CET (UTC+1)		Summary		Stadium: Høddvoll Stadion

30 March 2015	Aalesund	2–2	Molde	Ålesund
18:00 CET (UTC+1)	James 64' 76'	Summary	Kamra 21'; Agnaldo 57'	Stadium: Color Line Stadion

== Competitions ==
=== Tippeligaen ===
==== Results summary ====
Overall								Home						Away					
Pld	W	D	L	GF	GA	GD	Pts	W	D	L	GF	GA	GD	W	D	L	GF	GA	GD
30	11	5	14	42	57	−15	38	7	3	5	22	21	+1	4	2	9	20	36	−16

Last updated: 9 November 2015.
Source: see below

==== Results by round ====
Round	1	2	3	4	5	6	7	8	9	10	11	12	13	14	15	16	17	18	19	20	21	22	23	24	25	26	27	28	29	30
Ground	A	H	A	H	A	H	A	H	A	H	A	H	H	A	H	A	A	H	A	H	A	H	A	H	A	H	A	H	A	H
Result	L	D	L	L	W	W	W	D	L	L	D	W	D	L	W	L	L	W	L	W	L	W	L	L	D	W	W	L	W	L
Position	16	13	15	16	15	10	8	9	11	12	13	10	10	11	10	10	12	10	11	10	10	10	10	11	11	10	10	10	9	10

Updated to match(es) played on 9 November 2015. Source: see below
A = Away; H = Home; W = Win; D = Draw; L = Loss

==== Results ====
6 April 2015 1	Rosenborg	5–0	Aalesund	Trondheim
18:00 CEST (UTC+2)	Helland 1', 15', (penalty missed); Søderlund 42', 71'; Malec 85'	Summary	Mattila (yellow card) 21'; Barrantes (yellow card) 67'	Stadium: Lerkendal Stadion; Attendance: 19,872; Referee: Svein Oddvar Moen

12 April 2015 2	Aalesund	1–1	Lillestrøm	Ålesund
15:30 CEST (UTC+2)	Barrantes (yellow card) 29'; Larsen 89'	Summary	Knudtzon 50'; Fofana (yellow card) 56'	Stadium: Color Line Stadion; Attendance: 7,365; Referee: Espen Berntsen

19 April 2015 3	Molde	5–1	Aalesund	Molde
18:00 CEST (UTC+2)	Svendsen 5', 62'; Kamara 10', 75'; Høiland 81'	Summary	Barrantes 43'; Matilla (yellow card) 48'	Stadium: Aker Stadion; Attendance: 9,573; Referee: Dag Vidar Håfsås

26 April 2015 4	Aalesund	0–2	Tromsø	Ålesund
18:00 CEST (UTC+2)	Hoff (yellow card) 32'; Barrantes (yellow card) 72'	Summary	Ingebrigtsen 29'; Hansson (yellow card) 77'; Ondrášek 87'; Antonsen (yellow card) 90+2'	Stadium: Color Line Stadion; Attendance: 5,655; Referee: Martin Lundby

30 April 2015 5	Vålerenga	1–2	Aalesund	Oslo
18:00 CEST (UTC+2)	Gunnarsson 43'	Summary	James (yellow card) 51', (goal) 76'; Mattila (yellow card) 65', (goal) 81'	Stadium: Ullevaal Stadion; Attendance: 8,089; Referee: Tore Hansen

3 May 2015 6	Aalesund	2–0	Bodø/Glimt	Ålesund
15:30 CEST (UTC+2)	James 22'; Abdellaoue 63'	Summary	Badou (yellow card) 30'; Chatto (yellow card) 45+1'	Stadium: Color Line Stadion; Attendance: 6,825; Referee: Tom Harald Hagen

10 May 2015 7	Sandefjord	1–3	Aalesund	Sandefjord
15:30 CEST (UTC+2)	Fevang 53'; Pedersen (yellow card) 81'		Mäntylä (yellow card) 39'; Abdellaoue 71'; O.Lie (yellow card) 76'; Barrantes 89'; Mattila 90+2' (pen.)	Stadium: Komplett.no Arena; Attendance: 4,613; Referee: Espen Berntsen

13 May 2015 8	Aalesund	2–2	Sarpsborg 08	Ålesund
18:00 CEST (UTC+2)	James 56'; Mäntylä (yellow card) 70'; Larsen 86'	Summary	Grytebust 29' (o.g.); Zajić (yellow card) 78'; Kalludra 90'	Stadium: Color Line Stadion; Attendance: 6,478; Referee: Trygve Kjensli

16 May 2015 9	Strømsgodset	3–1	Aalesund	Drammen
18:00 CEST (UTC+2)	Fossum 33', 73'; Sørum 37'; Bugge Pettersen (yellow card) 85'	Summary	Latifu 59'	Stadium: Marienlyst Stadion; Attendance: 7,409; Referee: Ken Henry Johnsen

25 May 2015 10	Aalesund	0–4	Viking	Ålesund
18:00 CEST (UTC+2)	Larsen (yellow card) 35'	Summary	Abdullahi 44'; Berisha 70', 72'; Mets (yellow card) 75'; Böðvarsson 84'	Stadium: Color Line Stadion; Attendance: 6,197; Referee: Trond Ivar Døvle

29 May 2015 11	Odd	1–1	Aalesund	Skien
19:00 CEST (UTC+2)	Occéan 19', (yellow card) 76'; Samuelsen (yellow card) 90+2'	Summary	Björk 78'; Mäntylä (yellow card) 90'	Stadium: Skagerak Arena; Attendance: 6,769; Referee: Trond Ivar Døvle

7 June 2015 12	Aalesund	2–1	Haugesund	Ålesund
18:00 CEST (UTC+2)	Latifu (yellow card) 36'; Larsen 40'; Barrantes 45+1'	Summary	Diedhiou 68', (yellow card) 74'; Riski (yellow card) 72'; Haukås (yellow card) 83'	Stadium: Color Line Stadion; Attendance: 5,660; Referee: Omar Rafiq

21 June 2015 13	Aalesund	1–1	Stabæk	Ålesund
18:00 CEST (UTC+2)	Abdellaoue 6'; Larsen (yellow card) 30'	Summary	Grossman 45'; Meling (yellow card) 58'	Stadium: Color Line Stadion; Attendance: 6,518; Referee: Tommy Skjerven

27 June 2015 14	Start	3–1	Aalesund	Kristiansand
15:30 CEST (UTC+2)	Vilhjálmsson 2'; Christensen (yellow card) 14'; Børufsen 21'; Vikstøl (yellow card) 29'; Kristjánsson (yellow card) 83'; Ajer 85' (pen.)	Summary	Dyrestam (yellow card) 19'; Þrándarson 22' (yellow card) 69'; Abdellaoue (yellow card) 90+3'	Stadium: Sør Arena; Attendance: 6,002; Referee: Ole Gya

5 July 2015 15	Aalesund	4–2	Mjøndalen	Ålesund
18:00 CEST (UTC+2)	Larsen (yellow card) 26'; James 55', 83'; Þrándarson 88'; Björk 90+1'	Summary	Gauseth 5'; Olsen 37'; Grewal (yellow card) 62' (yellow-red card) 63'	Stadium: Color Line Stadion; Attendance: 6 021; Referee: Ken Henry Johnsen

11 July 2015 16	Viking	4–1	Aalesund	Stavanger
15:30 CEST (UTC+2)	Abdullahi 4'; Adegbenro (yellow card) 11'; Böðvarsson 29', 43'; Sigurðsson 65'	Summary	Skagestad (yellow card) 43'; Abdellaoue 61'	Stadium: Viking Stadion; Attendance: 7,642; Referee: Trygve Kjensli

26 July 2015 17	Bodø/Glimt	1–0	Aalesund	Bodø
15:30 CEST (UTC+2)	Ndiaye 63'	Summary	Matland (yellow card) 39'	Stadium: Aspmyra Stadion; Attendance: 4,051; Referee: Tore Hansen

2 August 2015 18	Aalesund	2–0	Start	Ålesund
18:00 CEST (UTC+2)	Þrándarson 53'; Matland 64'	Summary	Børufsen (yellow card) 18'; Christensen (yellow card) 63'	Stadium: Color Line Stadion; Attendance: 6,939; Referee: Svein Oddvar Moen

9 August 2015 19	Haugesund	3–1	Aalesund	Haugesund
18:00 CEST (UTC+2)	Gytkjær 29', 42', 88'; Haraldseid (yellow card) 53'	Summary	Þrándarson (yellow card) 43'; Lie (yellow card) 44'; James 54' (pen.); Bjørdal (yellow card) 82'	Stadium: Haugesund Stadion; Attendance: 4,668; Referee: Martin Lundby

14 August 2015 20	Aalesund	2–1	Strømsgodset	Ålesund
19:00 CEST (UTC+2)	Bjørdal 25'; Riise (yellow card) 48'; Skagestad (yellow card) 59'; Abdellaoue 62'	Summary	Jradi (yellow card) 38', (goal) 46'; Pedersen (yellow card) 81'	Stadium: Color Line Stadion; Attendance: 6,388; Referee: Trygve Kjensli

23 August 2015 21	Sarpsborg 08	3–1	Aalesund	Sarpsborg
18:00 CEST (UTC+2)	Zajić 10'; Wiig 20', 54'; Hansen (yellow card) 64'; Askar (yellow card) 82'	Summary	James 65' (pen.)	Stadium: Sarpsborg Stadion; Attendance: 3,533; Referee: Tore Hansen

28 August 2015 22	Aalesund	2–0	Vålerenga	Ålesund
19:00 CEST (UTC+2)	James 12'; Larsen 45+1'	Summary	Tollås (yellow card) 35'	Stadium: Color Line Stadion; Attendance: 6,479; Referee: Tommy Skjerven

13 September 2015 23	Lillestrøm	3–1	Aalesund	Lillestrøm
18:00 CEST (UTC+2)	Lundemo 11'; Jørgen Kolstad 43'; Friday 47'	Summary	Riise (yellow card) 37'; Latifu (yellow card) 77'; James 89' (pen.)	Stadium: Åråsen Stadion; Attendance: 5,353; Referee: Svein Oddvar Moen

20 September 2015 24	Aalesund	1–3	Odd	Ålesund
15:30 CEST (UTC+2)	James 23'	Summary	Diouf 34', 54'; Samuelsen (yellow card) 78'; Jensen 81' (yellow card) 90+2'	Stadium: Color Line Stadion; Attendance: 6,140; Referee: Trygve Kjensli

27 September 2015 25	Tromsø	1–1	Aalesund	Tromsø
18:00 CEST (UTC+2)	Oršulić (yellow card) 58'; Espejord 71'; Ondrášek (yellow card) 85'	Summary	R.Johansen 51' (o.g.); Hoseth (yellow card) 66'; Bjørdal (yellow card) 69'; Hoff (yellow card) 78'	Stadium: Alfheim Stadion; Attendance: 3,402; Referee: Trond Ivar Døvle

4 October 2015 26	Aalesund	2–1	Sandefjord	Ålesund
18:00 CEST (UTC+2)	Abdellaoue 89'; Þrándarson 90+2'	Summary	Mendy 22'; Mjelde (yellow card) 60'; Morer (yellow card) 71'	Stadium: Color Line Stadion; Attendance: 7,463; Referee: Dag Vidar Hafsås

17 October 2015 27	Stabæk	1–4	Aalesund	Bærum
18:00 CEST (UTC+2)	Asante (yellow card) 52' (goal) 74'	Summary	Hoseth 34', 79'; Matland 51'; Latifu (yellow card) 68'; James (yellow card) 76' (goal) 90'	Stadium: Nadderud Stadion; Attendance: 3,852; Referee: Kim Andre Johnsen

25 October 2015 28	Aalesund	1–2	Molde	Ålesund
15:30 CEST (UTC+2)	James 39'; Skagestad (yellow card) 79'	Summary	Høiland 15' (yellow card) 38'; Singh (yellow card) 75'; Elyounoussi 76'	Stadium: Color Line Stadion; Attendance: 8,023; Referee: Svein Erik Edvartsen

1 November 2015 29	Mjøndalen	1–2	Aalesund	Mjøndalen
18:00 CEST (UTC+2)	Sundli (yellow card) 54'; Gauseth (yellow card) 66'; Nguen 90+1'	Summary	James 35'; Lie (yellow card) 74'; Þrándarson 90+4'	Stadium: Isachsen Stadion; Attendance: 2,912; Referee: Martin Lundby

8 November 2015 30	Aalesund	0–1	Rosenborg	Ålesund
18:00 CEST (UTC+2)	Þrándarson (yellow card) 61'; Matland (yellow card) 66'; Riise (yellow card) 90+2'	Summary	Jensen (yellow card) 72' (goal) 90+3' (pen.)	Stadium: Color Line Stadion; Attendance: 8,287; Referee: Ola Hobber Nilsen

==== Table ====
Pos	Team	Pld	W	D	L	GF	GA	GD	Pts
8	Lillestrøm (Note: Lillestrøm started the season with a one point deduction due to poor financial reporting.)	30	12	9	9	45	43	+2	44
9	Bodø/Glimt	30	12	4	14	53	56	−3	40
10	Aalesund	30	11	5	14	42	57	−15	38
11	Sarpsborg 08	30	8	10	12	37	49	−12	34
12	Haugesund	30	8	7	15	33	52	−19	31

Source: Football Association of Norway (in Norwegian), Soccerway
Rules for classification: 1) Points; 2) Goal difference; 3) Goals scored; 4) Head-to-head points; 5) Head-to-head goal difference; 6) Head-to-head away goals scored (between two teams).

=== Norwegian Cup ===
22 April 2015 First Round	Stryn	1–3	Aalesund	Stryn
18:00 CEST (UTC+2)	M.Wie 2'; K.Aarsheim (yellow card) 30'	Summary	Bjørdal 15'; Abdellaoue 62'; Larsen 80'	Stadium: Stryn krøllgras Attendance: 750; Referee: Petter Kristiansen Toppe

6 May 2015 Second Round	Strindheim	2–5	Aalesund	Trondheim
18:00 CEST (UTC+2)	Andersen 13'; Rye 84'	Summary	Björk 18'; Mattila (yellow card) 31'; Bjørdal 44'; James 53', 64'; Matland 68'; Grétarsson (yellow card) 88'	Stadium: Strindheim kunstgress Attendance: 276; Referee: Robert Eggen

3 June 2015 Third Round	Hødd	1–0	Aalesund	Ulsteinvik
18:00 CEST (UTC+2)	Myklebust 37'; Wrele (yellow card) 41'	Summary	Larsen (yellow card) 28'; O. Lie (yellow card) 67'; Barrantes (yellow card) 86'; Skagestad (yellow card) 89'; A. Lie (yellow card) 90+4'	Stadium: Høddvoll Stadion; Attendance: 2,974; Referee: Kai Erik Steen

== Squad statistics ==
As of match played 8 November 2015

=== Appearances and goals ===
No.	Pos	Nat	Player	Total		Tippeligaen		Norwegian Cup	
No.	Pos	Nat	Player	Apps	Goals	Apps	Goals	Apps	Goals
1	GK	(Norway) NOR	Andreas Lie	6	0	3	0	3	0
2	DF	(Nigeria) NGR	Akeem Latifu	32	1	28+1	1	3	0
3	DF	(Iceland) ISL	Daníel Leó Grétarsson	10	0	3+5	0	2	0
4	DF	(Finland) FIN	Tero Mäntylä	18	0	12+4	0	2	0
5	DF	(Norway) NOR	Oddbjørn Lie	24	0	19+2	0	3	0
6	DF	(Sweden) SWE	Mikael Dyrestam	28	0	27	0	1	0
8	MF	(Norway) NOR	Fredrik Carlsen	4	0	2+2	0	0	0
9	FW	(Sweden) SWE	Carl Björk	16	3	0+14	2	1+1	1
10	MF	(Norway) NOR	Peter Orry Larsen	27	5	23+2	4	1+1	1
11	MF	(Iceland) ISL	Aron Elís Þrándarson	19	5	13+5	5	0+1	0
13	GK	(Norway) NOR	Sten Grytebust	27	0	27	0	0	0
14	MF	(Nigeria) NGR	Leke James	33	15	29	13	4	2
15	MF	(Brazil) BRA	Marlinho	4	0	1+3	0	0	0
16	MF	(Norway) NOR	Magne Hoseth	10	2	9+1	2	0	0
17	MF	(Norway) NOR	Henrik Rørvik Bjørdal	33	3	28+2	1	3	2
20	DF	(Norway) NOR	Thomas Martinussen	7	0	2+3	0	2	0
21	MF	(Norway) NOR	Bjørn Helge Riise	13	0	13	0	0	0
22	DF	(Norway) NOR	Jo Nymo Matland	22	3	15+6	2	1	1
23	DF	(Norway) NOR	Edvard Skagestad	25	0	18+5	0	1+1	0
30	FW	(Norway) NOR	Mustafa Abdellaoue	28	7	19+7	6	2	1
33	MF	(Norway) NOR	Elias Dahlberg	2	0	0+1	0	0+1	0
39	MF	(Norway) NOR	Vebjørn Hoff	26	0	14+11	0	0+1	0
40	FW	(Norway) NOR	Sondre Fet	4	0	0+3	0	0+1	0
Players away from Aalesunds on loan:
37	FW	(Norway) NOR	Torbjørn Grytten	9	0	2+7	0	0	0
Players who appeared for Aalesunds no longer at the club:
7	DF	(Finland) FIN	Sakari Mattila	15	2	12	2	3	0
24	GK	(Norway) NOR	Helge Sandvik	1	0	0+1	0	0	0
31	MF	(Costa Rica) CRC	Michael Barrantes	14	3	12	3	2	0

=== Goal scorers ===
Place	Position	Nation	Number	Name	Tippeligaen	Norwegian Cup	Total
1	FW	(Nigeria)	14	Leke James	13	2	15
2	FW	(Norway)	30	Mustafa Abdellaoue	6	1	7
3	MF	(Iceland)	11	Aron Elís Þrándarson	5	0	5
3	MF	(Norway)	10	Peter Orry Larsen	4	1	5
5	MF	(Costa Rica)	31	Michael Barrantes	3	0	3
5	FW	(Sweden)	9	Carl Björk	2	1	3
5	DF	(Norway)	22	Jo Nymo Matland	2	1	3
5	MF	(Norway)	17	Henrik Rørvik Bjørdal	1	2	3
9	MF	(Finland)	7	Sakari Mattila	2	0	2
9	MF	(Norway)	16	Magne Hoseth	2	0	2
11	DF	(Nigeria)	2	Akeem Latifu	1	0	1
11				Own goal	1	0	1
				TOTALS	42	8	50

=== Disciplinary record ===
Number	Nation	Position	Name	Tippeligaen		Norwegian Cup		Total	
Number	Nation	Position	Name	Yellow card	Red card	Yellow card	Red card	Yellow card	Red card
1	(Norway)	GK	Andreas Lie	0	0	1	0	1	0
2	(Nigeria)	DF	Akeem Latifu	3	0	0	0	3	0
3	(Iceland)	DF	Daníel Leó Grétarsson	0	0	1	0	1	0
4	(Finland)	DF	Tero Mäntylä	3	0	0	0	3	0
5	(Norway)	DF	Oddbjørn Lie	3	0	1	0	4	0
6	(Sweden)	DF	Mikael Dyrestam	1	0	0	0	1	0
7	(Finland)	MF	Sakari Mattila	3	0	1	0	4	0
10	(Norway)	MF	Peter Orry Larsen	3	0	1	0	4	0
11	(Iceland)	FW	Aron Elís Þrándarson	3	0	0	0	3	0
14	(Nigeria)	FW	Leke James	2	0	0	0	2	0
16	(Norway)	MF	Magne Hoseth	1	0	0	0	1	0
17	(Norway)	MF	Henrik Rørvik Bjørdal	2	0	0	0	2	0
21	(Norway)	MF	Bjørn Helge Riise	3	0	0	0	3	0
22	(Norway)	DF	Jo Nymo Matland	2	0	0	0	2	0
23	(Norway)	DF	Edvard Skagestad	3	0	1	0	4	0
30	(Norway)	FW	Mustafa Abdellaoue	1	0	0	0	1	0
31	(Costa Rica)	MF	Michael Barrantes	3	0	1	0	4	0
39	(Norway)	MF	Vebjørn Hoff	2	0	0	0	2	0
			TOTALS	38	0	7	0	45	0
