= Andreas Lie =

Norwegian footballer (born 1987)

Personal information
- Date of birth: 31 August 1987 (age 39)
- Place of birth: Ålesund, Norway
- Height: 1.86 m (6 ft 1 in)
- Position: Goalkeeper

Team information
- Current team

Youth career
- Herd

Senior career*
Years	Team	Apps	(Gls)
2004–2010	Aalesund	33	(0)
2005	→ Hødd (Loan)	6	(0)
2010–2013	Odd	9	(0)
2013–2021	Aalesund	135	(0)
2013	→ Hødd (Loan)	25	(0)

International career
2004	Norway U-17	6	(0)
2005	Norway U-18	9	(0)
2005–2006	Norway U-19	3	(0)
2007–2008	Norway U-21	15	(0)
- * Club domestic league appearances and goals

Andreas Lie (born 31 August 1987) is a Norwegian former association footballer who played as a goalkeeper.

== Career ==
=== Aalesund ===
Lie started his senior career with Aalesund in 2004. In his five year spell there, he made 33 league appearances.

=== Hødd (First Loan) ===
For the 2005 season, Lie was loaned out to Hødd. He made 6 appearances in the league before his loan spell expired.

=== ODDS ===
In January 2010, Lie was sold to Odds BK. However, he only made nine league appearances in two years with the club.

=== Return to Aalesund ===
On 14 August 2012 he announced that he was leaving Odd Grenland as his contract expired at the end of the 2012 season and broke the news that he had re-signed for Aalesund on a two-year contract, starting 1 January 2013 and lasting until the end of the 2014 season.

=== Hødd (Second Loan) ===
In January 2013, Lie was loaned out again to Hødd. This time, he made 25 league appearances, helping them to the promotion playoffs.

=== International ===
Lie has played 15 matches for the Norwegian under-21 national team.

== Personal life ==
Lie's twin brother, Oddbjørn Lie, also plays for Aalesund.

== Career statistics ==
As of match played 6 December 2020

Appearances and goals by club, season and competition
Club	Season	League			National Cup		Continental		Other		Total	
Club	Season	Division	Apps	Goals	Apps	Goals	Apps	Goals	Apps	Goals	Apps	Goals
Aalesund	2004	1. divisjon	1	0	0	0	-		-		1	0
Aalesund	2005	Adeccoligaen	0	0	0	0	-		-		0	0
Aalesund	2006	Adeccoligaen	10	0	1	0	-		-		11	0
Aalesund	2007	Eliteserien	5	0	1	0	-		-		6	0
Aalesund	2008	Eliteserien	14	0	4	0	-		-		18	0
Aalesund	2009	Eliteserien	3	0	4	0	-		-		7	0
Aalesund	Total		33	0	10	0	-	-	-	-	43	0
Hødd (loan)	2005	Adeccoligaen	6	0	0	0	–		–		6	0
Odd	2010	Eliteserien	6	0	3	0	-		-		9	0
Odd	2011	Eliteserien	0	0	1	0	-		-		1	0
Odd	2012	Eliteserien	3	0	3	0	-		-		6	0
Odd	Total		9	0	7	0	-	-	-	-	16	0
Aalesund	2013	Eliteserien	0	0	0	0	-		-		0	0
Aalesund	2014	Eliteserien	0	0	1	0	-		-		1	0
Aalesund	2015	Eliteserien	3	0	3	0	-		-		6	0
Aalesund	2016	Eliteserien	28	0	1	0	-		-		29	0
Aalesund	2017	Eliteserien	29	0	1	0	-		-		30	0
Aalesund	2018	OBOS-ligaen	29	0	0	0	-		-		29	0
Aalesund	2019	OBOS-ligaen	28	0	2	0	-		-		30	0
Aalesund	2020	Eliteserien	16	0	0	0	-		-		16	0
Aalesund	Total		133	0	8	0	-	-	-	-	141	0
Hødd (loan)	2013	Adeccoligaen	25	0	1	0	2	0	–		28	0
Hødd (loan)	Total		25	0	1	0	2	0	-	-	28	0
Career total			206	0	26	0	2	0	-	-	234	0
