= Mikkel Kirkeskov =

Danish footballer (born 1991)

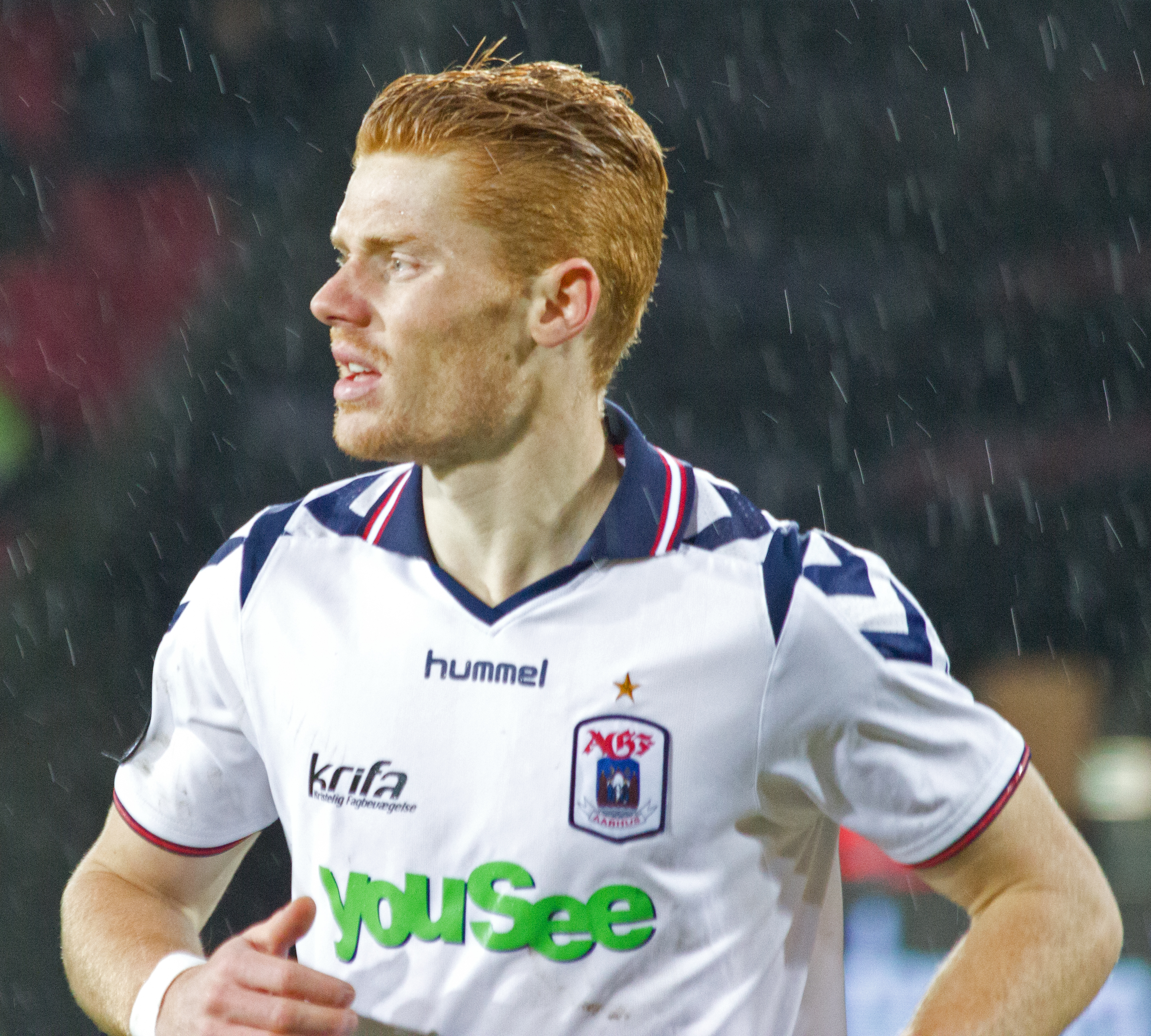
- Kirkeskov with AGF in 2013

Personal information
- Full name: Mikkel Kirkeskov Andersen
- Date of birth: 5 September 1991 (age 35)
- Place of birth: Aarhus, Denmark
- Height: 1.85 m (6 ft 1 in)
- Position: Left-back

Youth career
- VRI
- 2005–2009: AGF

Senior career*
Years	Team	Apps	(Gls)
2009–2014	AGF		
2014–2016	OB	23	(0)
2016–2018	Aalesund	57	(2)
2018	→ Piast Gliwice (loan)	7	(0)
2018–2021	Piast Gliwice	79	(2)
2021–2023	Holstein Kiel	46	(0)
2023–2024	Zagłębie Lubin	9	(0)
2024	Holstein Kiel	6	(0)
2024	Holstein Kiel II	1	(0)
2024–2026	Preußen Münster	48	(0)

International career
2010	Denmark U19	1	(0)
2010–2012	Denmark U20	5	(0)
2012	Denmark U21	7	(0)
- * Club domestic league appearances and goals as of 16:11, 17 May 2026 (UTC)

Mikkel Kirkeskov Andersen (born 5 September 1991) is a Danish professional footballer who plays as a left-back.

== Career ==
=== AGF ===
Kirkeskov was born in Aarhus, Denmark, and started playing football for VRI before joining the youth ranks of the city's main team, AGF in 2005. He was promoted to their first team in the spring of 2009. He made his league debut for AGF in the second tier of Danish football in a 3–0 away victory against FC Fredericia on 7 November 2010, replacing Adam Eckersley at half-time. After the winter break, Kirkeskov made more appearances and the club reached promotion back to the Danish Superliga towards the end of the season. He made his debut in the top tier on 15 August 2011 in a 1–1 away draw against Silkeborg IF, coming off the bench in the 80th minute for Stephan Petersen. In his first season in the Superliga, Kirkeskov made 16 games.

=== Aalesund ===
Kirkeskov moved to Tippeligaen side Aalesunds FK in January 2016.

=== Piast Gliwice ===
On 15 February 2018, Kirkeskov joined Polish Ekstraklasa club Piast Gliwice.

=== Holstein Kiel ===
In December 2020 it was announced Kirkeskov would move to 2. Bundesliga club Holstein Kiel for the second half of the 2020–21 season on a contract until the summer of 2023.

=== Zagłębie Lubin ===
On 31 July 2023, Kirkeskov returned to Poland as a free agent, joining Ekstraklasa side Zagłębie Lubin on a two-year deal. He made nine appearances before terminating his contract by mutual consent and forfeiting the remainder of his salary on 18 January 2024, citing personal reasons.

=== Second stint at Holstein Kiel ===
Kirkeskov returned to former club Holstein Kiel in January 2024, having agreed a contract until the end of June.

=== Preußen Münster ===
On 14 June 2024, Kirkeskov moved to Preußen Münster, recently promoted to 2. Bundesliga.

== Career statistics ==
=== Club ===
As of match played 31 August 2024

Appearances and goals by club, season and competition
Club	Season	League			National cup (Note: Includes Danish Cup, Norwegian Cup, Polish Cup, DFB-Pokal)		Continental		Other		Total	
Club	Season	Division	Apps	Goals	Apps	Goals	Apps	Goals	Apps	Goals	Apps	Goals
AGF	2010–11	Danish 1st Division	13	0	0	0	—		—		13	0
AGF	2011–12	Superligaen	16	0	3	0	—		—		19	0
AGF	2012–13	Superligaen	31	0	2	0	1 (Note: Appearance(s) in UEFA Europa League)	0	—		34	0
AGF	2013–14	Superligaen	32	0	3	0	—		—		35	0
AGF	2014–15	Danish 1st Division	1	0	0	0	—		—		1	0
AGF	Total		93	0	8	0	1	0	—		102	0
OB	2014–15	Superligaen	14	0	1	0	—		—		15	0
OB	2015–16	Superligaen	9	0	2	0	—		—		11	0
OB	Total		23	0	3	0	—		—		26	0
Aalesunds	2016	Eliteserien	29	2	3	0	—		—		32	2
Aalesunds	2017	Eliteserien	28	0	3	0	—		—		31	0
Aalesunds	Total		57	2	6	0	—		—		63	2
Piast Gliwice (loan)	2017–18	Ekstraklasa	7	0	0	0	—		—		7	0
Piast Gliwice	2018–19	Ekstraklasa	36	2	0	0	—		—		36	2
Piast Gliwice	2019–20	Ekstraklasa	36	0	1	0	4 (Note: Two appearances in UEFA Champions League, two appearances in UEFA Europa League)	0	1 (Note: Appearance in Polish Super Cup)	0	38	0
Piast Gliwice	2020–21	Ekstraklasa	7	0	1	0	3	0	—		11	0
Piast Gliwice	Total		79	2	2	0	7	0	1	0	89	2
Holstein Kiel	2020–21	2. Bundesliga	6	0	2	0	—		1 (Note: Appearance in promotion play-offs)	0	9	0
Holstein Kiel	2021–22	2. Bundesliga	14	0	1	0	—		—		15	0
Holstein Kiel	2022–23	2. Bundesliga	26	0	0	0	—		—		26	0
Holstein Kiel	Total		46	0	3	0	—		1	0	50	0
Zagłębie Lubin	2023–24	Ekstraklasa	9	0	0	0	—		—		9	0
Holstein Kiel	2023–24	2. Bundesliga	6	0	—		—		—		6	0
Holstein Kiel II	2023–24	Regionalliga Nord	1	0	—		—		—		1	0
Preußen Münster	2024–25	2. Bundesliga	29	0	1	0	—		—		30	0
Preußen Münster	2025–26	2. Bundesliga	19	0	0	0	—		—		19	0
Preußen Münster	Total		48	0	1	0	—		—		49	0
Career total			362	4	23	0	8	0	2	0	395	4

== Honours ==
Piast Gliwice

- Ekstraklasa: 2018–19
