= Mustafa Abdellaoue =

Norwegian footballer (born 1988)

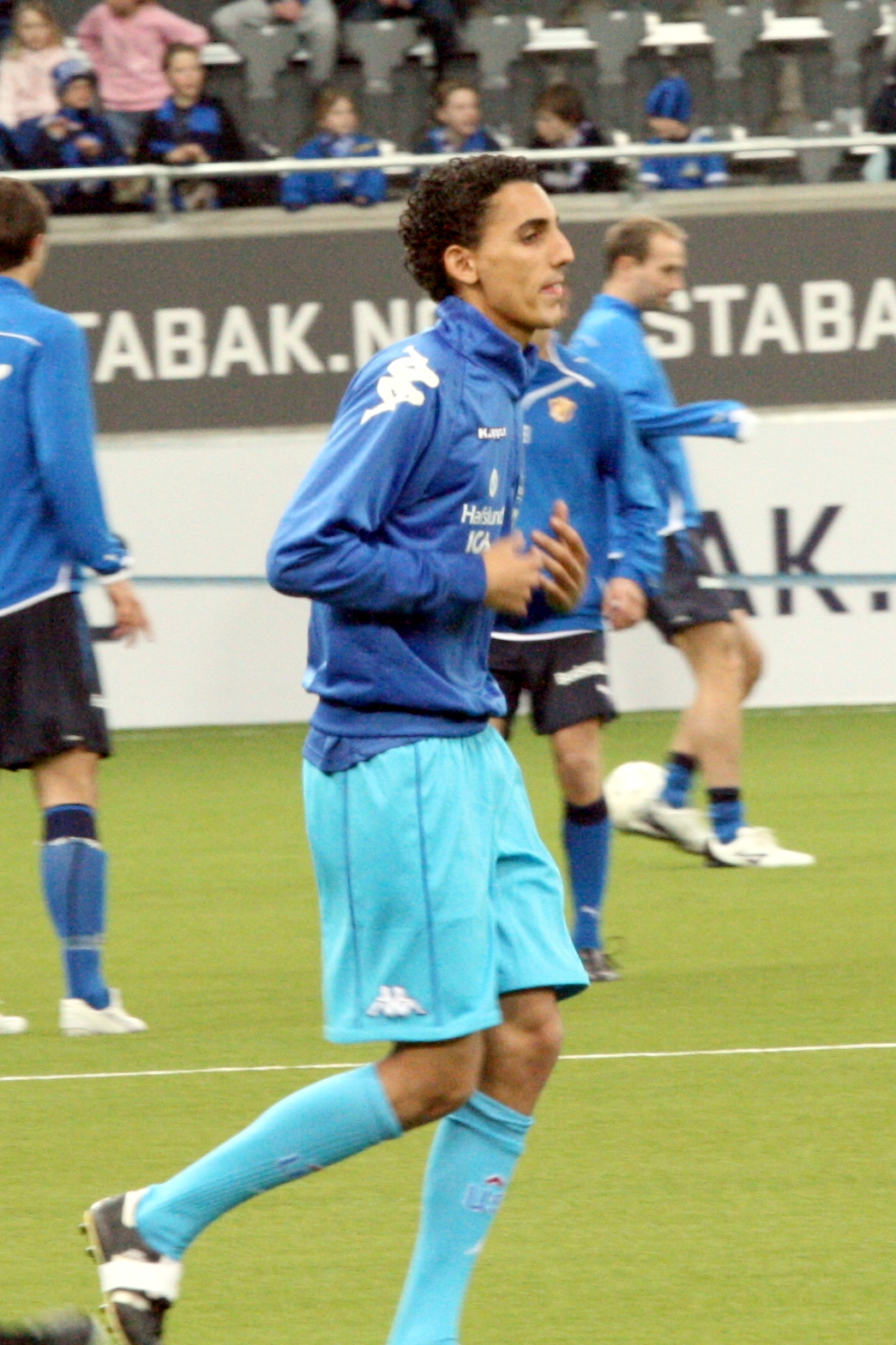
- Abdellaoue with Vålerenga in 2009

Personal information
- Date of birth: 1 August 1988 (age 38)
- Place of birth: Oslo, Norway
- Height: 1.81 m (5 ft 11 in)
- Position: Forward

Youth career
- –2006: Skeid

Senior career*
Years	Team	Apps	(Gls)
2006–2008	Skeid	28	(17)
2009–2012	Vålerenga	33	(7)
2011	→ Tromsø (loan)	29	(17)
2012–2014	Copenhagen	14	(4)
2013	→ Vålerenga (loan)	10	(1)
2013–2014	→ OB (loan)	26	(9)
2014–2017	Aalesund	98	(37)
2018–2019	Strømsgodset	40	(10)
2019–2021	Sarpsborg 08	28	(7)

International career^{‡}
2006	Norway U18	4	(1)
2007	Norway U19	1	(0)
2011	Norway U23	1	(1)
2012	Norway	3	(0)
- * Club domestic league appearances and goals as of 00:11, 19 September 2022 (UTC) ‡ National team caps and goals as of 21 January 2012

Mustafa "Mos" Abdellaoue (born 1 August 1988) is a Norwegian former professional footballer who played as a forward. He is the younger brother of former Norway international Mohammed Abdellaoue.

== Club career ==
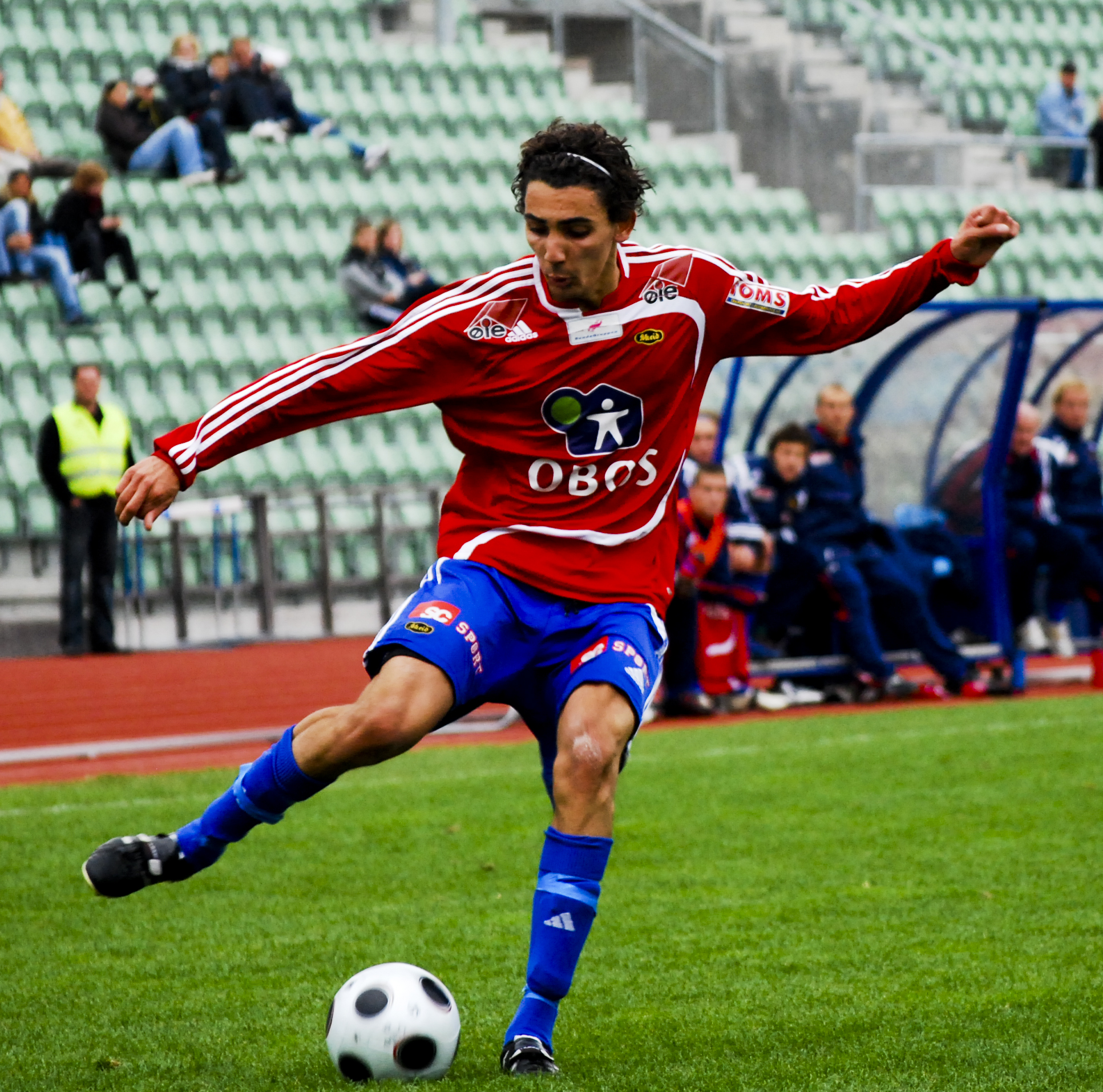
Mos in action for Skeid

Abdellaoue was born in Oslo, Norway. He made his debut for Skeid in 2007, and played a total of six games during the relegation campaign from the First Division, the second tier in Norwegian football. He was loaned out to Lillestrøm and played games for their reserve team in Norwegian Second Division, scoring one goal, before returning to Skeid. In 2008, he scored 17 goals in 20 matches when Skeid won the Second Division Group 2, and gained direct promotion back to the First Division.

In September 2008, Abdellaoue and his teammate Dawda Leigh signed for Norwegian Premier League side Vålerenga IF under the Bosman rule, and joined the club on 1 January 2009. His brother Mohammed had also joined the club from the same club the season before.

On 13 April 2009, Abdellaoue scored his first league goal for Vålerenga in a 2–0 victory away to Lillestrøm.

In the 2010 season, he was named top-scorer of the Norwegian Second Division avd. 1 with Vålerenga's B team, scoring 27 goals. He scored 13 in that division the season before with the same team.

Abdellaoue spent the 2011 season loaned out to Tromsø IL, where he became the top scorer of Tippeligaen with 17 goals. He finished runner-up in the league with Tromsø. After he returned from Tromsø, Vålerenga rejected a 5 mill NOK offer for him from F.C. Copenhagen in January 2012.

Mostafa joined FC Copenhagen in January 2012. Mostafa scored his first goal in a friendly against FC Anzhi. In his third match he scored twice against his former club Vålerenga IF in his debut at Parken.

On 31 August 2013, Abdellaoue was sent on a one-year loan deal to OB.

In July 2014, Abdellaoue returned to the Tippeligaen permanently by signing for Aalesunds FK.

On 24 January 2018, Strømsgodset announced that he had signed a four-year-contract with the club.

== International career ==
"Mos" made his debut for the senior team when he replaced Thomas Sørum at half time in a 1–1 friendly draw against Denmark on 15 January 2012.

== Personal life ==
He is the younger brother of former Norway international Mohammed Abdellaoue.

== Career statistics ==
=== Club ===
As of match played 19 September 2022

Appearances and goals by club, season and competition
Club	Season	League			National cup		Continental		Other		Total	
Club	Season	Division	Apps	Goals	Apps	Goals	Apps	Goals	Apps	Goals	Apps	Goals
Skeid	2007	Norwegian First Division	6	0	0	0	–		–		6	0
Skeid	2008	Norwegian Second Division	22	17	1	0	–		–		23	17
Skeid	Total		28	17	1	0	–		–		29	17
Vålerenga	2009	Tippeligaen	15	2	3	1	–		1 (Note: Appearance in Superfinalen)	0	19	3
Vålerenga	2010	Tippeligaen	18	5	2	3	–		–		20	8
Vålerenga	Total		33	7	5	4	–		1	0	39	11
Tromsø (loan)	2011	Tippeligaen	29	17	3	5	3 (Note: Appearances in UEFA Europa League)	0	–		35	22
Copenhagen	2011–12	Danish Superliga	9	2	3	1	–		–		12	3
Copenhagen	2012–13	Danish Superliga	5	2	0	0	–		–		5	2
Copenhagen	Total		14	4	3	1	–		–		17	5
Vålerenga (loan)	2013	Tippeligaen	10	1	3	3	–		–		13	4
OB (loan)	2013–14	Danish Superliga	26	9	1	3	–		–		27	12
Aalesund	2014	Tippeligaen	13	2	0	0	–		–		13	2
Aalesund	2015	Tippeligaen	26	6	2	1	–		–		28	7
Aalesund	2016	Tippeligaen	29	13	3	5	–		–		32	18
Aalesund	2017	Eliteserien	30	16	3	2	–		–		33	18
Aalesund	Total		98	37	8	8	–		–		106	45
Strømsgodset	2018	Eliteserien	24	7	7	8	–		–		31	15
Strømsgodset	2019	Eliteserien	16	3	1	1	–		–		17	4
Strømsgodset	Total		40	10	8	9	–		–		48	19
Sarpsborg 08	2019	Eliteserien	11	1	0	0	–		–		11	1
Sarpsborg 08	2020	Eliteserien	17	6	0	0	–		–		17	6
Sarpsborg 08	Total		28	7	0	0	–		–		28	7
Career total			304	109	32	33	3	0	1	0	340	142

== Honours ==
Skeid

- Norwegian Second Division Group 2: 2008

Copenhagen

- Danish Superliga: 2012–13
- Danish Cup: 2011–12

Individual

- Tippeligaen Top goalscorer: 2011
- Norwegian Cup Top goalscorer: 2016, 2018
