= Akeem Latifu =

Nigerian footballer

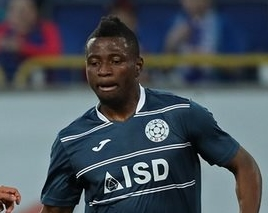

Personal information
- Full name: Akeem Latifu
- Date of birth: 16 November 1989 (age 36)
- Place of birth: Kano, Nigeria
- Height: 1.82 m (5 ft 11 1/2 in)
- Positions: Defender; right back

Senior career*
Years	Team	Apps	(Gls)
2007–2008	Bussdor	35	(10)
2009	Ocean Boys	12	(1)
2010	Akwa United	15	(5)
2010–2011	Strømsgodset	2	(0)
2011–2014	Hødd	76	(5)
2013	→ Aalesund (loan)	11	(0)
2014–2015	Aalesund	58	(2)
2016	Stal Dniprodzerzhynsk	6	(0)
2016	Alanyaspor	0	(0)
2017	Zira	11	(1)
2017–2018	Budapest Honvéd	14	(0)
2018	Sogndal	29	(2)
2019–2020	Mjøndalen	18	(0)
2020–2021	Jerv	25	(1)

International career^{‡}
2007	Nigeria U-20	4	(0)
2015	Nigeria	2	(0)
- * Club domestic league appearances and goals as of 22:15, 18 March 2022 ‡ National team caps and goals as of 16 August 2017

Akeem Latifu (born 16 November 1989 in Kano) is a retired Nigerian footballer.

== Career ==
=== Club ===
Latifu began his career for Bussdor United F.C. and signed a contract for Ocean Boys in January 2009 . After a half-year who earned 17 caps left Ocean Boys F.C. and signed for Nigeria Premier League rival Akwa United F.C. in January 2010. On 9 August 2013 he signed a loan-contract with Aalesund.

On 21 January 2017, Latifu signed a 1.5-year contract with Azerbaijan Premier League side Zira FK.

On 26 July 2017, Latifu signed for Budapest Honvéd. His contract expired in November 2017 and he became a free agent.

On 19 February 2018, Latifu signed a two-year contract with OBOS-ligaen club Sogndal. He left the club on 18 December 2018 by mutual termination.

In March 2022 it was reported that he had joined English side Hyde United. However, no further confirmations was made.

=== International ===
Latifu was part of the Nigeria national under-20 football team at the 2007 FIFA U-20 World Cup in Canada and played four games in the tournament.

Latifu was called up to Nigeria national football team on 16 March 2015.

=== Post-playing career ===
Settling in Manchester, Latifu became a player agent.

== Career statistics ==
=== Club ===
As of match played 14 July 2019

Appearances and goals by club, season and competition
Club	Season	League			National Cup		League Cup		Continental		Other		Total	
Club	Season	Division	Apps	Goals	Apps	Goals	Apps	Goals	Apps	Goals	Apps	Goals	Apps	Goals
Strømsgodset	2010	Tippeligaen	2	0	0	0	–		–		–		2	0
Hødd	2011	First Division	30	1	3	1	–		–		–		33	2
Hødd	2012	First Division	29	1	7	0	–		–		–		36	1
Hødd	2013	First Division	17	3	3	0	–		1	0	–		21	3
Hødd	Total		76	5	13	1	-	-	1	0	-	-	90	6
Aalesunds (loan)	2013	Tippeligaen	11	0	0	0	–		–		–		11	0
Aalesunds	2014	Tippeligaen	29	1	4	1	–		–		–		33	2
Aalesunds	2015	Tippeligaen	29	1	3	0	–		–		–		32	1
Aalesunds	Total		58	2	7	1	-	-	-	-	-	-	65	1
Stal Dniprodzerzhynsk	2015–16	Ukrainian Premier League	6	0	1	0	–		–		–		7	0
Alanyaspor	2016–17	Süper Lig	0	0	0	0	–		–		–		0	0
Zira	2016–17	Azerbaijan Premier League	11	0	0	0	–		–		–		11	0
Budapest Honvéd	2017–18	Nemzeti Bajnokság I	14	0	2	0	–		0	0	–		16	0
Sogndal	2017–18	OBOS-ligaen	26	2	2	0	–		0	0	–		28	2
Career total			204	9	25	2	-	-	1	0	-	-	230	11

=== International ===
Nigeria national team
Year	Apps	Goals
2015	2	0
Total	2	0

Statistics accurate as of match played 29 March 2015

== Honours ==
=== Club ===
Hødd

- Norwegian Football Cup (1): 2012
