= Emil Solnørdal =

Norwegian footballer (born 1999)

Personal information
- Full name: Emil Solnørdal
- Date of birth: 2 October 1999 (age 27)
- Place of birth: Ålesund, Norway
- Height: 1.70 m (5 ft 7 in)
- Position: Midfielder

Team information
- Current team: Hødd
- Number: 2

Youth career
- 2013–2017: Aalesund
- 2018: Rosenborg

Senior career*
Years	Team	Apps	(Gls)
2017–2018	Aalesund	1	(0)
2019	Brattvåg	13	(0)
2020–	Hødd	1	(0)

International career^{‡}
2016	Norway U17	9	(0)
- * Club domestic league appearances and goals as of 1 January 2020 ‡ National team caps and goals as of 1 January 2020

Emil Solnørdal (born 2 October 1999) is a Norwegian football player who plays as midfielder for IL Hødd in 2020.

Solnørdal started his youth career with Aalesund in 2013, and his senior career their professional club in 2017. After two season, he moved to Brattvåg in 2019.
