= Kaj Ramsteijn =

Dutch footballer (born 1990)

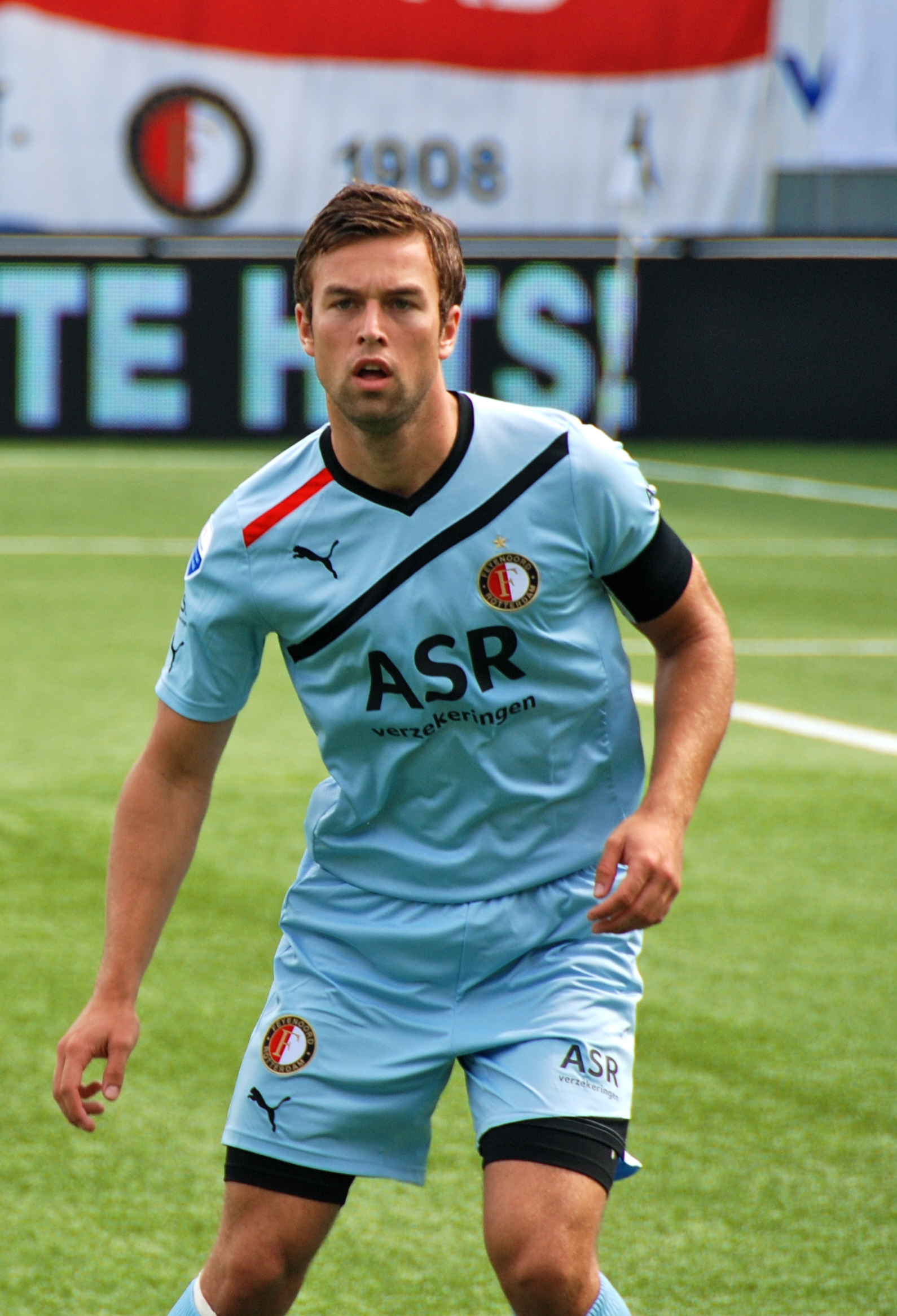
- Ramsteijn with Feyenoord in 2011

Personal information
- Date of birth: 17 January 1990 (age 36)
- Place of birth: Zoetermeer, Netherlands
- Height: 1.87 m (6 ft 2 in)
- Position: Centre-back

Team information
- Current team: Lisse
- Number: 6

Youth career
- DWO
- 2000–2010: Feyenoord

Senior career*
Years	Team	Apps	(Gls)
2010–2011	Excelsior	25	(1)
2011–2014	Feyenoord	7	(0)
2013	→ VVV-Venlo (loan)	12	(0)
2013–2014	→ Sparta Rotterdam (loan)	29	(0)
2014–2015	Marítimo	10	(0)
2015–2017	Almere City	48	(1)
2017–2019	Aalesund	71	(2)
2020–2023	Kozakken Boys	60	(2)
2023–2025	IJsselmeervogels	48	(0)
2025–	Lisse	0	(0)

International career
2010–2011	Netherlands U21	4	(0)
- * Club domestic league appearances and goals as of 15:43, 4 August 2025 (UTC)

Kaj Ramsteijn (Dutch pronunciation: [ˈkɑi rɑmˈstɛin]; born 17 January 1990) is a Dutch professional footballer who plays as a centre-back for Derde Divisie club Lisse.

== Club career ==
Kaj Ramsteijn started at the age of 10 in the Feyenoord youth academy, coming over from DWO Zoetermeer. As a central defender he faced a lot of competition in the first squad of Feyenoord. Mid June 2010 he transferred to Excelsior Rotterdam. He signed a 2-year contract that will keep him at Excelsior Rotterdam until the summer of 2012. He made his professional début on 22 September 2010 in a match against WKE Emmen. His début in the starting 11 was on 24 October 2010 against Ajax. Ramsteijn made his first goal in a match against Willem II on 27 November 2010. The game ended in a 1–1 draw. After his first season at professional level, Ramsteijn was rewarded for his good season with a transfer to his former club Feyenoord, who has an extensive partnership agreement with Excelsior, together with team-mates Guyon Fernandez and Miquel Nelom.

In 2013, he was hired by Sparta Rotterdam and a year prior to it signed a two-year contract with Feyenoord.
