= Torbjørn Grytten =

Norwegian footballer (born 1995)

Personal information
- Date of birth: 6 April 1995 (age 31)
- Place of birth: Ålesund Municipality, Norway
- Height: 1.83 m (6 ft 0 in)
- Position: Forward

Team information
- Current team: Brattvåg
- Number: 8

Youth career
- –2009: Norborg

Senior career*
Years	Team	Apps	(Gls)
2010–2011	Brattvåg		
2011–2016	Aalesund	29	(2)
2015	→ Brattvåg (loan)	9	(3)
2016–2018	Brattvåg	63	(43)
2019	KÍ Klaksvík	13	(3)
2020–	Brattvåg	10	(2)
- * Club domestic league appearances and goals as of 3 October 2020

Torbjørn Grytten (born 6 April 1995) is a Norwegian football striker who currently plays for 2. divisjon side Brattvåg.

== Career ==
Grytten is from the village of Grytastranda in the Ålesund Municipality. He started his youth career with the Norborg sports club system. In 2010, started his senior career with Brattvåg, playing in the 3. divisjon. He joined the Aalesunds FK club, competing in Norway's top tier Tippeligaen, in the summer of 2011, making his league debut as a substitute in September 2012 against Tromsø. He signed a professional contract in March 2014.

In the summer of 2015 he went on a twelve-month loan back to Brattvåg. After the expiration of the loan period, the move was made permanent.

Grytten signed with Faroe Islands Premier League side KÍ Klaksvík for the 2019 season.

== Career statistics ==
=== Club ===
As of match played 3 October 2020

Appearances and goals by club, season and competition
Club	Season	League			National Cup		Europe		Total	
Club	Season	Division	Apps	Goals	Apps	Goals	Apps	Goals	Apps	Goals
Aalesund	2012	Tippeligaen	1	0	0	0	-		1	0
Aalesund	2013	Tippeligaen	1	0	0	0	-		1	0
Aalesund	2014	Tippeligaen	18	2	1	0	-		19	2
Aalesund	2015	Tippeligaen	9	0	1	0	-		10	0
Aalesund	Total		29	2	2	0	-	-	31	2
Brattvåg (loan)	2015	3. divisjon	9	3	0	0	-		9	3
Brattvåg	2016	PostNord-ligaen	18	14	2	0	-		20	14
Brattvåg	2017	Norsk Tipping-ligaen	25	22	1	0	-		26	22
Brattvåg	2018	PostNord-ligaen	20	7	3	1	-		23	8
Brattvåg	Total		72	46	6	1	-	-	78	47
KÍ Klaksvík	2019	Betri Deildin	13	3	2	1	5	0	20	4
KÍ Klaksvík	Total		13	3	2	1	5	0	20	4
Brattvåg	2020	PostNord-ligaen	10	2	0	0	-		10	2
Brattvåg	Total		10	2	0	0	-	-	10	2
Career total			124	53	10	2	5	0	139	55

== Honours ==
KÍ Klaksvík

- Faroese Premier League (1): 2019
