= Jo Nymo Matland =

Norwegian footballer (born 1987)

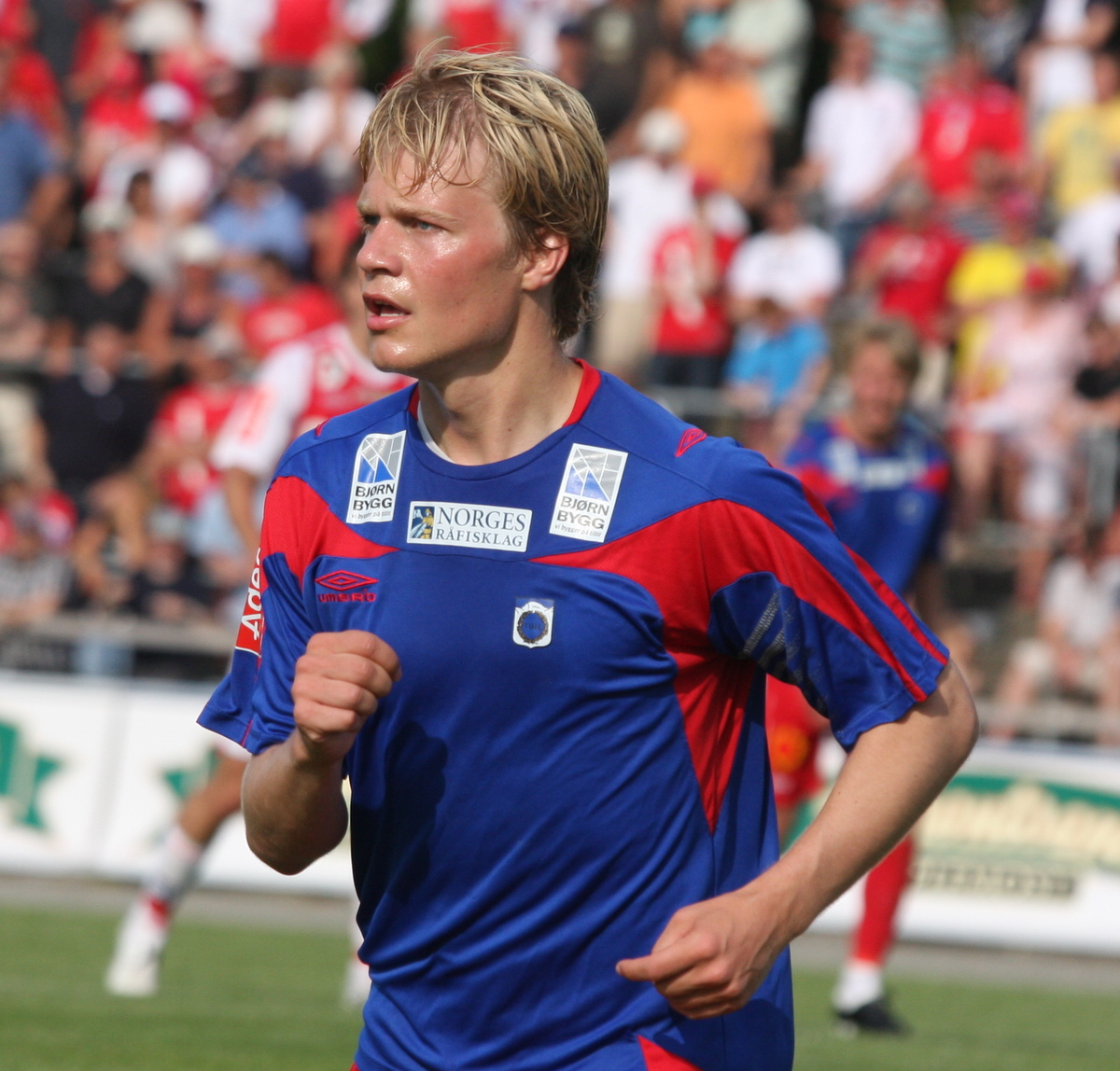

Personal information
- Date of birth: 21 April 1987 (age 39)
- Place of birth: Tromsø, Norway
- Height: 1.82 m (6 ft 0 in)
- Position: Left back

Youth career
- Tromsø

Senior career*
Years	Team	Apps	(Gls)
2004–2007	Tromsø	2	(0)
2005	→ Tromsdalen (loan)	19	(0)
2007	→ Tromsdalen (loan)	14	(0)
2008–2010	Tromsdalen	81	(13)
2011	Sarpsborg 08	17	(3)
2011–2015	Aalesund	100	(7)
2016	Royal Antwerp	6	(0)
2016–2017	Sporting Hasselt	17	(2)
2017–2018	Tromsdalen	27	(4)
2018–2019	Brattvåg	22	(1)
2019–2021	HamKam	39	(8)
2021	Lyn	10	(2)

International career
2003	Norway U16	8	(0)
2004	Norway U17	11	(0)
2005	Norway U18	7	(1)
- * Club domestic league appearances and goals as of 28 August 2021

Jo Nymo Matland (born 21 April 1987) is a former Norwegian football defender.

== Career ==
Matland began his senior career at Tromsø IL in 2004, making two league appearances. He spent time on loan at Tromsdalen UIL in 2005 and 2007 before joining Tromsdalen permanently in 2008, where he scored 13 goals in 81 league fixtures.

In November 2010, Matland transferred to Sarpsborg 08, making 17 appearances and scoring three goals in the 2011 season. He then joined Aalesunds FK, where he featured in 100 league matches and scored seven goals between 2011 and 2015.

Matland later had brief spells abroad with Belgian sides Royal Antwerp and Sporting Hasselt in 2016–2017. He returned to Norway with Tromsdalen, Brattvåg IL, and HamKam before finishing his playing career at Lyn in 2021.

After retiring from professional football in 2022, Matland joined FK Bodø/Glimt as a scout in February 2024.

=== Early career ===
He signed a youth contract with Tromsø in 2004, He was a first-team squad member for the 2005 La Manga Cup. However, in the 2005 season he was loaned out to Tromsdalen.

=== Tippeligaen debut ===
In 2006, he was back in Tromsø, and started the season opener. He got two games in the Norwegian Premier League, Tippeligaen, that season. In 2007, he was loaned out to Tromsdalen again. The move was made permanent ahead of the 2008 season.

=== Sarpsborg 08 ===
On 18 November 2010, he signed for Eliteserien side Sarpsborg 08.

== Career statistics ==
Season	Club	Division	League		Cup		Total	
Season	Club	Division	Apps	Goals	Apps	Goals	Apps	Goals
2004	Tromsø	Eliteserien	0	0	0	0	0	0
2005	Tromsdalen	2. divisjon	19	0	2	0	21	0
2006	Tromsø	Eliteserien	2	0	1	0	3	0
2007	Tromsø	Eliteserien	0	0	1	0	1	0
2007	Tromsdalen	1. divisjon	14	0	0	0	14	0
2008	Tromsdalen	2. divisjon	24	4	2	1	26	5
2009	Tromsdalen	1. divisjon	29	4	2	0	31	4
2010	Tromsdalen	1. divisjon	28	5	3	1	31	6
2011	Sarpsborg 08	Eliteserien	17	3	4	0	21	3
2011	Aalesund	Eliteserien	12	0	3	0	15	0
2012	Aalesund	Eliteserien	21	3	0	0	21	3
2013	Aalesund	Eliteserien	25	2	2	0	27	2
2014	Aalesund	Eliteserien	21	0	4	1	25	1
2015	Aalesund	Eliteserien	21	2	1	1	22	3
2015–16	Royal Antwerp	Proximus League	6	0	0	0	6	0
2016–17	Sporting Hasselt	Belgian First Amateur Division	17	2	3	0	20	2
2017	Tromsdalen	1. divisjon	12	0	0	0	12	0
2018	Tromsdalen	1. divisjon	15	4	1	0	16	4
2018	Brattvåg	2. divisjon	11	0	0	0	11	0
2019	Brattvåg	2. divisjon	11	1	2	0	13	1
2019	HamKam	1. divisjon	14	3	0	0	14	3
2020	HamKam	1. divisjon	24	5	0	0	24	5
2021	HamKam	1. divisjon	1	0	0	0	1	0
Career Total			344	38	31	4	375	42
