= Adam Örn Arnarson =

Icelandic footballer

Adam Arnarson
Personal information
- Full name: Adam Örn Arnarson
- Date of birth: 27 August 1995 (age 31)
- Place of birth: Iceland
- Height: 1.80 m (5 ft 11 in)
- Position: Right back

Team information
- Current team: Leiknir
- Number: 17

Youth career
- –2012: Breiðablik

Senior career*
Years	Team	Apps	(Gls)
2012	Breiðablik	1	(0)
2013–2014	NEC Nijmegen	0	(0)
2014–2016	Nordsjælland	16	(0)
2016–2018	Aalesund	75	(1)
2019–2020	Górnik Zabrze	13	(0)
2019	Górnik Zabrze II	8	(0)
2020–2021	Tromsø	22	(2)
2022–2023	Breiðablik	2	(0)
2022	→ Leiknir (loan)	10	(0)
2023–2025	Fram	51	(0)
2025–	Leiknir	13	(2)

International career
2011–2012	Iceland U17	13	(0)
2012–2014	Iceland U19	19	(0)
2015–2016	Iceland U21	11	(0)
2017	Iceland	1	(0)
- * Club domestic league appearances and goals as of 12 September 2026

Adam Örn Arnarson (born 27 August 1995) is an Icelandic professional footballer who plays as a right-back for Leiknir.

== Club career ==
Arnarson started his career with local club Breiðablik before moving to NEC Nijmegen in the Eredivisie in January 2013. In August 2014, he joined Danish Superliga club FC Nordsjælland, managed by compatriot Ólafur Kristjánsson. In November 2014, Arnarson made his Superliga debut for Nordsjælland in a 1–0 loss to OB.

Arnarson left Aalesund at the end of the 2018 season. He joined Górnik Zabrze in February 2019. After a spell with Tromsø, he rejoined Breiðablik in 2022.

== International career ==
Arnarson has been involved with the U-17 and U-19 teams, having in total 32 caps for these sides.
