= Carl Björk (footballer, born 1992) =

Swedish footballer (born 1992)

Calle Björk
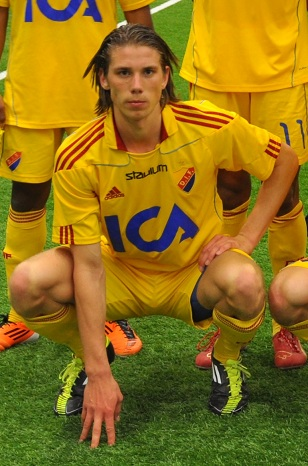
- Björk with Djurgårdens IF in 2011

Personal information
- Full name: Carl Björk
- Date of birth: 4 February 1992 (age 34)
- Place of birth: Stockholm, Sweden
- Height: 1.89 m (6 ft 2 in)
- Position: Forward

Youth career
- Tungelsta IF
- 2004–2011: Djurgårdens IF

Senior career*
Years	Team	Apps	(Gls)
2011–2012	Djurgårdens IF	6	(1)
2011	→ Jönköpings Södra IF (loan)	13	(2)
2012	→ IK Brage (loan)	11	(1)
2012	→ Västerås SK (loan)	7	(1)
2013–2014	Brattvåg IL	50	(68)
2015	Aalesunds FK	14	(2)
2016–2017	Nyköpings BIS	29	(14)
2017	Vasalunds IF	8	(0)
2018–2022	Värtans IK	47	(24)
2023	Vasastan BK	7	(0)
Total		192	(113)

International career
2011	Sweden U19	2	(0)
- * Club domestic league appearances and goals

Carl "Calle" Björk (born 4 February 1992) is a Swedish former professional footballer who played as a forward.

== Career ==
Björk came to Djurgårdens IF from his childhood club Tungelsta IF in 2004, and progressed through the youth teams. During the 2010 pre-season, he was promoted from Djurgården's youth team. He made his Allsvenskan debut on 11 April 2011 against Kalmar FF as a substitute, scoring in a 3–2 loss.

In early July 2011, he was sent on loan to Superettan club Jönköpings Södra IF for one month. At the same time, his U21 contract was extended for one year with Djurgårdens IF. The loan deal was then extended for the rest of the season, with an opportunity for Djurgården to recall him if deemed necessary. During the 2012 season, he was sent on loan to IK Brage, with an option to end the loan prematurely in August.

In the 2013 and 2014 seasons, Björk played for Norwegian Third Division club Brattvåg IL, where he scored 70 goals in 54 matches. In 2015, he signed with Eliteserien club Aalesunds FK.

In July 2017, Björk signed for Vasalunds IF. Before the 2018 season, he moved to Division 4 club Värtans IK. Björk scored 16 goals in 19 matches for the club during the 2018 season as they won promotion to Division 3. In the 2019 season, he scored five goals in 14 league matches. The following season, Björk scored one goal in seven league matches. In the 2021 season, he played seven games and scored two goals in Division 4.

Björk played for Division 4 club Vasastan BK during the 2023 season, where he made seven appearances. He retired from football at the end of the season.

== Career statistics ==
Club performance			League		Cup		Continental		Total	
Season	Club	League	Apps	Goals	Apps	Goals	Apps	Goals	Apps	Goals
Sweden			League		Svenska Cupen		Europe		Total	
2011	Djurgårdens IF	Allsvenskan	6	1	2	0	—		8	1
2011	Jönköpings Södra IF	Superettan	13	2	—		—		13	2
2012	IK Brage	Superettan	11	1	1	0	—		12	1
2012	Västerås SK	Division 1	7	1	—		—		7	1
Norway			League		Norwegian Football Cup		Europe		Total	
2013	Brattvåg IL	Third Division	25	30	1	1	—		26	31
2014	Brattvåg IL	Third Division	25	38	3	1	—		28	39
2015	Aalesunds FK	Tippeligaen	14	2	2	1	—		16	3
2016	Aalesunds FK	Tippeligaen	0	0	0	0	—		0	0
Career total			101	75	9	3	0	0	110	78
