= Lars Cramer =

Norwegian footballer (born 1991)

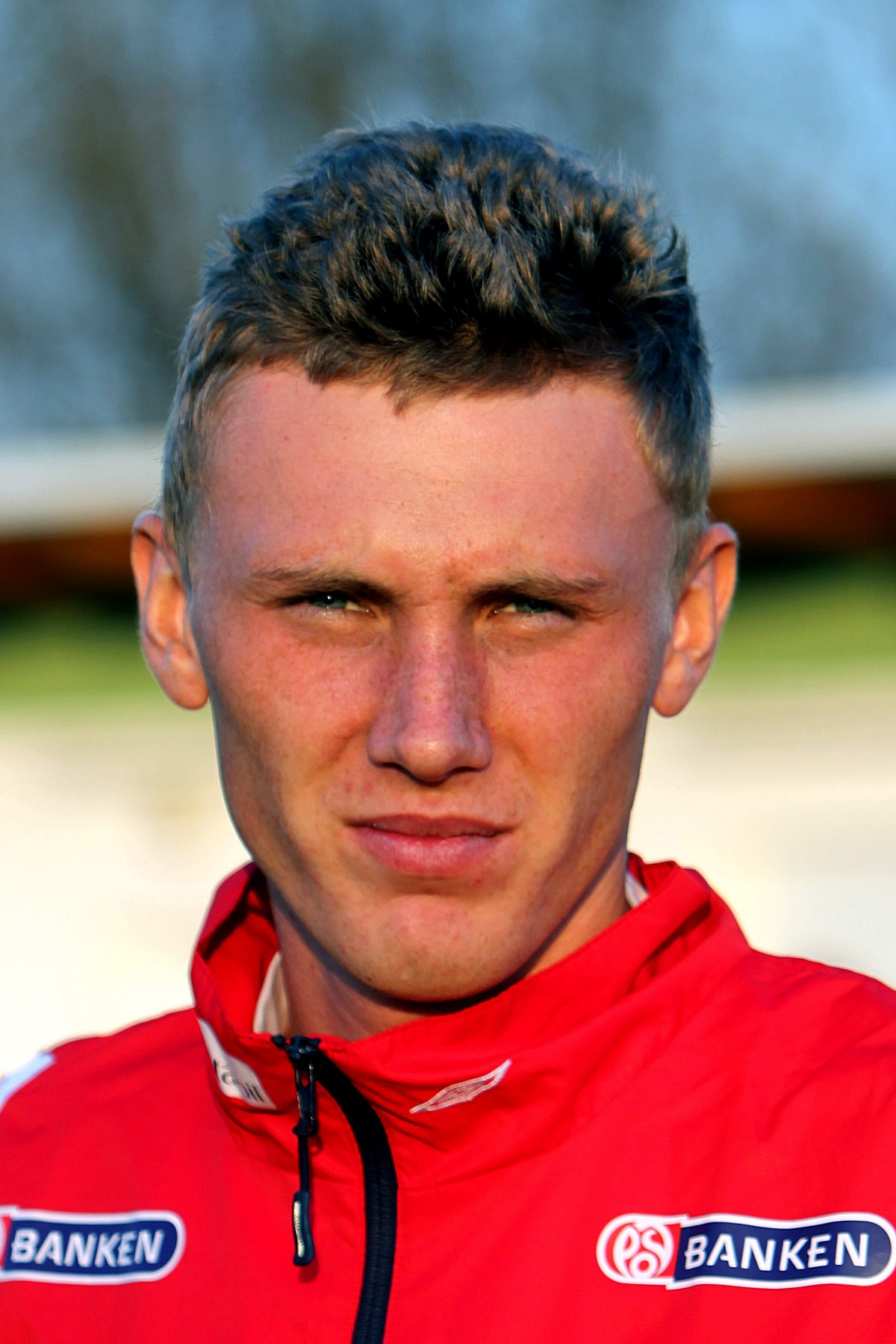
- Cramer before a match for Norway U21

Personal information
- Full name: Lars Gramstad Cramer
- Date of birth: 25 May 1991 (age 35)
- Place of birth: Drammen, Norway
- Height: 1.87 m (6 ft 1 1/2 in)
- Position: Goalkeeper

Youth career
- –2006: Glassverket

Senior career*
Years	Team	Apps	(Gls)
2007–2012	Strømsgodset	2	(0)
2010	→ Asker (loan)		
2011	→ Asker (loan)	17	(0)
2013–2015	Kalmar	49	(0)
2016	Aalesund	2	(0)
2017	Brann	0	(0)

International career
2010	Norway U19	2	(0)
2011	Norway U21	1	(0)
2012–2015	Norway U23	5	(0)
- * Club domestic league appearances and goals

Lars Cramer (born 25 May 1991) is a retired Norwegian footballer who played as a goalkeeper.

== Career ==
Cramer spent the 2010 season with Asker on loan. He was also loaned out to Asker in the 2011 season and played 17 matches for the club in the First Division. Strømsgodset used their option to recall Cramer in August 2011, and he made his debut in Eliteserien against Odd Grenland on 2 October 2011, when Adam Larsen Kwarasey was benched by head coach Ronny Deila.

Cramer has represented Norway at youth level, and played two matches for the under-19 team in 2010, one match for the under-21 team in 2011 and one match for the Norway national under-23 football team|under-23 team in 2012.

Cramer retired from professional football when his contract with Aalesund ran out after the 2016-season, to focus on a medical degree at the University of Bergen. On September 6, 2017, however, he signed a short-term contract with SK Brann as they were in dire need of goalkeepers for the remainder of the 2017 season.
