= Marlinho =

Brazilian footballer

Personal information
- Full name: Marlon Matheus da Silva
- Date of birth: 24 March 1994 (age 32)
- Place of birth: Duque de Caxias, Brazil
- Height: 1.64 m (5 ft 5 in)
- Position: Midfielder

Senior career*
Years	Team	Apps	(Gls)
2015	Tigres do Brasil	11	(0)
2015	Duque de Caxias	4	(1)
2015	→ Aalesund (loan)	4	(0)
2016–2018	Aalesund	22	(0)
2018–2020	Kongsvinger	59	(4)
2020–2021	Boluspor	19	(1)
2022	Madureira	6	(0)
2022	Angra dos Reis		
- * Club domestic league appearances and goals as of 6 March 2022

Marlon Matheus da Silva (born 24 March 1994), known as Marlinho, is a Brazilian professional footballer who plays as a midfielder.

== Career ==
On 17 August 2015, Marlinho moved to Norwegian Tippeligaen side Aalesunds FK on loan for the remainder of the 2015 season. Following the conclusion of the 2015 season, on 15 December 2015, Marlinho signed a three-year contract with Aalesunds.

== Career statistics ==
As of match played 6 October 2019

Appearances and goals by club, season and competition
Club	Season	League			National cup		Continental		Total	
Club	Season	Division	Apps	Goals	Apps	Goals	Apps	Goals	Apps	Goals
Tigres do Brasil	2015	Campeonato Carioca	11	0	0	0	–		11	0
Duque de Caxias	2015	Série D	4	1	0	0	–		4	1
Aalesunds (loan)	2015	Tippeligaen	4	0	0	0	–		4	0
Aalesunds	2016	Tippeligaen	12	0	3	0	–		15	0
Aalesunds	2017	Eliteserien	10	0	2	1	–		12	1
Aalesunds	Total		22	0	5	1	0	0	27	1
Kongsvinger	2018	OBOS-ligaen	27	4	3	0	–		30	4
Kongsvinger	2019	OBOS-ligaen	20	0	3	0	–		23	0
Kongsvinger	Total		47	4	6	0	0	0	53	4
Career total			88	5	11	1	0	0	99	6
