= Trond Fredriksen =

Norwegian footballer and manager (born 1977)

Personal information
- Date of birth: 21 May 1977 (age 49)
- Place of birth: Ålesund, Norway
- Height: 1.82 m (5 ft 11 1/2 in)
- Position: Midfielder

Senior career*
Years	Team	Apps	(Gls)
- SPK Guard
2001–2010	Aalesund	235	(21)

Managerial career
- 2015: Aalesund (assistant)
- 2015–2017: Aalesund
- 2018: Aksla (coach developer)
- 2019–2020: Ull/Kisa
- 2022–2026: Vålerenga (player developer)
- * Club domestic league appearances and goals

Trond Fredriksen (born 21 May 1977) is a football coach and former Norwegian footballer. He is a former football midfielder and former manager for Aalesunds FK.

== Manager career ==
Ahead of the 2015 season, Fredriksen became assistant manager to the new Aalesund manager Harald Aabrekk. Aabrekk was sacked only a month into the league, and Fredriksen took over with Karl Oskar Fjørtoft as his assistant. Fredriksen managed Aalesund until being relegated from the 2017 Eliteserien, but was sacked after the 2017 season. In August 2018 he was hired as coach developer in city minnows Aksla IL.

Ahead of the 2019 season he moved to Eastern Norway as the new manager of Ull/Kisa. He was sacked here after the 2020 season. He worked in the Football Association of Norway for a period, before being hired by Vålerenga as a player developer ahead of the 2022 season.

== Personal life ==
Trond Fredriksen's son Tengel Lia Fredriksen played for Aalesund 2 before joining Ull/Kisa in the summer of 2019. In the summer of 2022, he joined Vålerenga 2 before moving to Brattvåg in 2023. Tengel Lia Fredriksen was also capped once for Norway U17 in 2020.

== Career statistics ==
Season	Club	Division	League		Cup		Total	
Season	Club	Division	Apps	Goals	Apps	Goals	Apps	Goals
2001	Aalesund	1. divisjon	27	4	0	0	27	4
2002	Aalesund	1. divisjon	29	8	4	1	33	9
2003	Aalesund	Tippeligaen	24	1	4	0	28	1
2004	Aalesund	1. divisjon	29	1	0	0	29	1
2005	Aalesund	Tippeligaen	24	1	0	0	24	1
2006	Aalesund	1. divisjon	28	3	3	1	31	4
2007	Aalesund	Tippeligaen	24	1	4	0	28	1
2008	Aalesund	Tippeligaen	20	1	3	0	23	1
2009	Aalesund	Tippeligaen	16	0	7	0	23	0
2010	Aalesund	Tippeligaen	14	1	1	1	15	2
Career Total			235	21	26	3	261	24
