= Fredrik Carlsen =

Norwegian footballer (born 1989)

Personal information
- Full name: Fredrik Kjernmoen Carlsen
- Date of birth: 1 December 1989 (age 36)
- Place of birth: Oslo, Norway
- Height: 1.75 m (5 ft 9 in)
- Position: Midfielder

Youth career
- Oppsal
- Nordstrand

Senior career*
Years	Team	Apps	(Gls)
2008–2009	Vålerenga	1	(0)
2009–2022	Aalesund	219	(7)

International career
2007	Norway U18	7	(1)
2008	Norway U19	5	(0)
2010	Norway U21	2	(0)
- * Club domestic league appearances and goals

Fredrik Carlsen (born 1 December 1989) is a Norwegian former football midfielder.

He was under contract with Vålerenga Fotball, but was loaned to Aalesund for the 2009 season. This loan was extended for the 2010 season after the clubs couldn't agree a transfer price.

He was sent off during AaFK's first ever cup final in 2009 which the club still went on to win.

== Career statistics ==
Season	Club	Division	League		Cup		Total	
Season	Club	Division	Apps	Goals	Apps	Goals	Apps	Goals
2008	Vålerenga	Tippeligaen	1	0	2	0	3	0
2009	Aalesund	Tippeligaen	19	1	4	0	23	1
2010	Aalesund	Tippeligaen	23	1	0	0	23	1
2011	Aalesund	Tippeligaen	11	0	2	0	13	0
2012	Aalesund	Tippeligaen	11	0	3	0	14	0
2013	Aalesund	Tippeligaen	25	2	2	0	27	2
2014	Aalesund	Tippeligaen	10	0	2	0	12	0
2015	Aalesund	Tippeligaen	4	0	0	0	4	0
2016	Aalesund	Tippeligaen	24	1	0	0	24	1
2017	Aalesund	Eliteserien	27	1	4	0	31	1
2018	Aalesund	OBOS-ligaen	29	1	0	0	29	1
2019	Aalesund	OBOS-ligaen	22	0	2	1	24	1
2020	Aalesund	Eliteserien	14	0	0	0	14	0
Career Total			220	7	21	1	241	8
