= Oddbjørn Lie =

Norwegian footballer (born 1987)

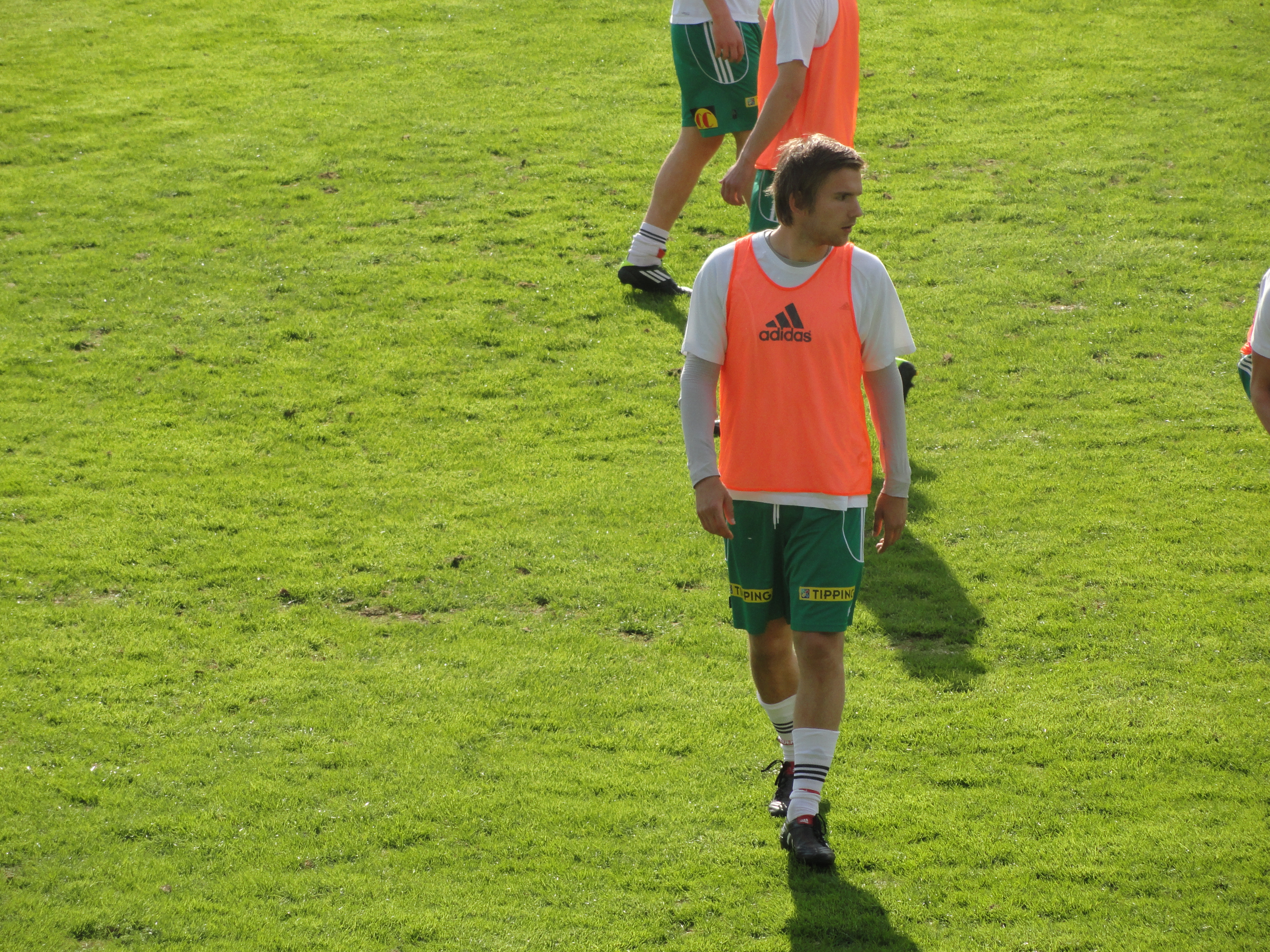

Personal information
- Full name: Oddbjørn Lie
- Date of birth: 31 August 1987 (age 39)
- Place of birth: Ålesund, Norway
- Height: 1.87 m (6 ft 1 1/2 in)
- Position: Defender

Senior career*
Years	Team	Apps	(Gls)
2004–2005	Aalesund	1	(0)
2006–2010	Hødd		
2011–2013	HamKam	73	(2)
2014–2020	Aalesund	157	(3)

International career^{‡}
2006	Norway U19	7	(1)
- * Club domestic league appearances and goals as of 20 September 2020 ‡ National team caps and goals as of 1 May 2016

Oddbjørn Lie (born 31 August 1987) is a former Norwegian footballer who plays as a defender. He is the brother of Andreas Lie.

== Club career ==
Lie was born in Ålesund. He made his senior debut for Aalesund on 31 October 2004 against Moss; Aalesund lost 2–1.

== Career statistics ==
As of 20 September 2020

Club	Season	Division	League		Cup		Total	
Club	Season	Division	Apps	Goals	Apps	Goals	Apps	Goals
HamKam	2011	Adeccoligaen	26	0	2	0	28	0
HamKam	2012	Adeccoligaen	18	0	0	0	18	0
HamKam	2013	Adeccoligaen	29	2	4	0	33	2
HamKam	Total		73	2	6	0	79	2
Aalesund	2014	Tippeligaen	25	0	3	0	28	0
Aalesund	2015	Tippeligaen	21	0	3	0	24	0
Aalesund	2016	Tippeligaen	26	1	1	0	27	1
Aalesund	2017	Eliteserien	26	0	4	0	30	0
Aalesund	2018	OBOS-ligaen	26	1	0	0	26	1
Aalesund	2019	OBOS-ligaen	20	1	3	1	23	2
Aalesund	2020	Eliteserien	13	0	0	0	13	0
Aalesund	Total		157	3	14	1	171	4
Career total			230	5	20	1	250	6
