= 2014 FK Bodø/Glimt season =

Bodø/Glimt
2014 season
- President: Mads Torrissen
- Manager: Bjørn-Tore Hansen
- Stadium: Aspmyra Stadion
- Tippeligaen: 13th
- Norwegian Cup: Fourth Round vs Stabæk
- Top goalscorer: League: Ibba Laajab (13); All: Ibba Laajab (13)
- Highest home attendance: 5,261 vs Rosenborg (21 April 2014)
- Lowest home attendance: 1,699 vs Stabæk (23 July 2014)
- Average home league attendance: 3,277 (9 November 2014)
Home colours	Away colours

The Bodø/Glimt 2014 season was Bodø/Glimt's first season back in the Tippeligaen since their relegation at the end of the 2009 season. Bodø/Glimt finished the season in 13th place and where knocked out of the Norwegian Cup by Stabæk in the Fourth Round.

== Squad ==
As of match played 9 November 2014

No.	Name	Nationality	Position	Date of birth (age)	Signed from	Signed in	Contract ends	Apps.	Goals
Goalkeepers
1	Pavel Londak	(Estonia)	GK	14 May 1980 (aged 34)	Flora	2007		178	0
12	Jonas Ueland Kolstad	(Norway)	GK	21 September 1976 (aged 38)	Årvoll	2002		81	0
25	Lasse Staw	(Norway)	GK	1 January 1988 (aged 26)	Aalesund	2014		18	0
Defenders
2	Ruben Imingen	(Norway)	DF	4 December 1986 (aged 27)	Fauske/Sprint	2005		182	3
3	Zarek Valentin	(United States)	DF	6 August 1991 (aged 23)	Montreal Impact	2014		35	1
4	Thomas Braaten	(Norway)	DF	30 June 1987 (aged 27)	Alta	2012		84	4
18	Brede Moe	(Norway)	DF	15 December 1991 (aged 22)	loan from Rosenborg	2014		30	3
21	Daniel Edvardsen	(Norway)	DF	31 August 1991 (aged 23)	Harstad	2014		0	0
22	Martin Pedersen	(Norway)	DF	14 January 1995 (aged 19)	Youth team	2012		0	0
23	Vieux Sané	(Senegal)	DF	4 August 1989 (aged 25)	Tromsø	2014		91	5
24	Kristian Brix	(Norway)	DF	13 June 1990 (aged 24)	Sandefjord	2014		32	0
29	Vebjørn Vinje	(Norway)	DF	7 April 1995 (aged 19)	Mo	2014		0	0
Midfielders
5	Thomas Jacobsen	(Norway)	MF	16 September 1983 (aged 31)	Lyn	2010		189	5
6	Anders Karlsen	(Norway)	MF	15 February 1990 (aged 24)	Youth team	2006		79	7
7	Badou	(Senegal)	MF	27 October 1990 (aged 24)	Diambars	2012		96	27
14	Ulrik Saltnes	(Norway)	MF	10 November 1992 (aged 21)	Brønnøysund	2011		50	4
15	Dominic Chatto	(Nigeria)	MF	7 December 1985 (aged 28)	BK Häcken	2014		26	2
16	Morten Konradsen	(Norway)	MF	3 May 1996 (aged 18)	Youth team	2012		33	4
17	Mathias Normann	(Norway)	MF	28 May 1996 (aged 18)	Lofoten	2012		1	0
27	Patrick Berg	(Norway)	MF	24 November 1997 (aged 16)	Youth team	2014		2	0
28	Dane Richards	(Jamaica)	MF	14 December 1983 (aged 30)	Burnley	2013		54	10
Forwards
10	Ibba Laajab	(Norway)	FW	21 May 1985 (aged 29)	Vålerenga	2013		62	32
19	Mouhamadou N'Diaye	(Senegal)	FW	24 August 1994 (aged 20)	loan from Slovan Liberec	2014		31	8
20	Ulrik Berglann	(Norway)	FW	31 May 1992 (aged 22)	Youth team	2011		75	6
26	Viljar Nordberg	(Norway)	FW	5 April 1992 (aged 22)	Vålerenga	2011			
30	Trond Olsen	(Norway)	FW	5 February 1984 (aged 30)	Viking	2014		215	59
Out on loan
9	Jim Johansen	(Norway)	FW	6 February 1987 (aged 27)	Strømsgodset	2011		95	39
11	Vegard Braaten	(Norway)	FW	30 June 1987 (aged 27)	Sporting Lokeren	2012		58	21
Players who left club during season
29	Erlend Robertsen	(Norway)	FW	5 February 1993 (aged 21)	Youth team	2010			

=== Out on loan ===
Note: Flags indicate national team as defined under FIFA eligibility rules; some limited exceptions apply. Players may hold more than one non-FIFA nationality.

No. / Pos. / Nation / Player; 9 / FW / NOR / Jim Johansen (at Bryne)	No. / Pos. / Nation / Player; 11 / FW / NOR / Vegard Braaten (at Alta)

== Transfers ==
=== In ===
Date	Position	Nationality	Name	From	Fee	Ref.
1 January 2014	DF	(United States)	Zarek Valentin	Montreal Impact	Undisclosed	
22 January 2014	FW	(Norway)	Trond Olsen	Viking	Undisclosed	
27 January 2014	DF	(Norway)	Kristian Brix	Sandefjord	Undisclosed	
9 February 2014	MF	(Nigeria)	Dominic Chatto	BK Häcken	Undisclosed	
9 February 2014	GK	(Norway)	Lasse Staw	Aalesund	Undisclosed	
12 August 2014	DF	(Norway)	Vebjørn Vinje	Mo	Undisclosed	

=== Loans in ===
Date from	Position	Nationality	Name	From	Date to	Ref.
6 March 2014	DF	(Norway)	Brede Moe	Rosenborg	End of season	
31 March 2014	FW	(Senegal)	Mouhamadou N'Diaye	Slovan Liberec	End of season	
9 August 2014	MF	(Norway)	Daniel Berntsen	Rosenborg	End of season	

=== Out ===
Date	Position	Nationality	Name	To	Fee	Ref.
23 February 2014	DF	(Spain)	Godwin Antwi	Sisaket	Undisclosed	
4 April 2014	GK	(Sweden)	Viktor Noring	Heerenveen	Undisclosed	

=== Loans out ===
Date from	Position	Nationality	Name	To	Date to	Ref.
31 March 2014	FW	(Norway)	Vegard Braaten	Alta	End of season	
11 August 2014	FW	(Norway)	Jim Johansen	Bryne	End of season	

=== Released ===
Date	Position	Nationality	Name	Joined	Date
31 December 2013	MF	(Norway)	Christian Berg	Fredrikstad	1 January 2014
1 April 2014	MF	(Norway)	Tommy Knarvik	Retired	
5 August 2014	FW	(Norway)	Erlend Robertsen	Bryne	31 August 2014
31 December 2014	DF	(Norway)	Thomas Braaten	Hønefoss	1 January 2015

== Competitions ==
=== Tippeligaen ===
==== Results summary ====
Overall								Home						Away					
Pld	W	D	L	GF	GA	GD	Pts	W	D	L	GF	GA	GD	W	D	L	GF	GA	GD
30	10	5	15	47	60	−13	35	6	5	4	27	29	−2	4	0	11	20	31	−11

Last updated: 9 November 2014.
Source: see below

==== Results by round ====
Round	1	2	3	4	5	6	7	8	9	10	11	12	13	14	15	16	17	18	19	20	21	22	23	24	25	26	27	28	29	30
Ground	H	A	H	H	A	H	A	H	A	H	A	A	H	A	H	A	H	A	A	H	A	H	A	H	A	H	A	H	A	H
Result	D	L	W	D	L	L	L	W	W	W	W	L	D	L	L	L	L	L	W	D	W	W	L	L	L	D	L	W	L	W
Position	8	12	8	9	11	11	10	10	9	9	9	9	8	8	9	11	12	14	12	10	9	8	10	12	12	12	13	13	13	13

Updated to match(es) played on 9 November 2014. Source: see below
A = Away; H = Home; W = Win; D = Draw; L = Loss

==== Results ====
30 March 2014 1	Bodø/Glimt	1–1	Aalesund	Bodø
15:30 CEST (UTC+2)	Richards 25'; Chatto (yellow card) 68'; Johansen (yellow card) 81'	Report	Phillips 13'	Stadium: Aspmyra Stadion; Attendance: 3,851; Referee: Svein-Erik Edvartsen

6 April 2014 2	Vålerenga	3–1	Bodø/Glimt	Oslo
18:00 CEST (UTC+2)	Kjartansson 7', 90+1' (pen.); Larsen (yellow card) 55'; Nilsen (yellow card) 77'; Lindkvist 79'; Stengel (yellow card) 84'	Report	Olsen 37'; Sané (yellow card) 50'; N'Diaye (yellow card) 85'	Stadium: Ullevaal Stadion; Attendance: 9,299; Referee: Ken Henry Johnsen

13 April 2014 3	Bodø/Glimt	4–2	Sogndal	Bodø
18:00 CEST (UTC+2)	Sané 17'; Karlsen (yellow card) 38'; Richards 54'; Badou 72'; N'Diaye 87'	Report	Flo 15', 36'; Opseth (yellow card) 44'; Strand (yellow card) 52'	Stadium: Aspmyra Stadion; Attendance: 3,122; Referee: Ola Hobber Nilsen

21 April 2014 4	Bodø/Glimt	2–2	Rosenborg	Bodø
18:00 CEST (UTC+2)	Laajab 7'; Brix (yellow card) 33'; Olsen 81'; Sané (yellow card) 83'; Badou (yellow card) 90+2'	Report	Pedersen 12' (yellow card) 83'; Reginiussen (yellow card) 53'; Søderlund 64'; Jensen (yellow card) 78'; Riski (yellow card) 90+3'	Stadium: Aspmyra Stadion; Attendance: 5,261; Referee: Trygve Kjensli

27 April 2014 5	Stabæk	2–1	Bodø/Glimt	Bærum
18:00 CEST (UTC+2)	Jalasto (yellow card) 3'; Høiland 13' (pen.); Fontanello 51'; Trondsen (yellow card) 66'	Report	N'Diaye 76' (yellow card) 84'	Stadium: Nadderud Stadion; Attendance: 4,002; Referee: Dag Vidar Hafsås

1 May 2014 6	Bodø/Glimt	1–2	Lillestrøm	Bodø
18:00 CEST (UTC+2)	Chatto 13'	Report	Knudtzon 6'; Fofana 75'	Stadium: Aspmyra Stadion; Attendance: 3,807; Referee: Brage Sandmoen

4 May 2014 7	Strømsgodset	2–0	Bodø/Glimt	Drammen
18:00 CEST (UTC+2)	Fossum 8'; Hamoud 24'; Sætra (yellow card) 42'	Report		Stadium: Marienlyst Stadion; Attendance: 6,427; Referee: Tom Harald Hagen

10 May 2014 8	Bodø/Glimt	2–1	Haugesund	Bodø
15:30 CEST (UTC+2)	Laajab 10'; Badou 45'; Moe (yellow card) 90+4'	Report	Cvetinović (yellow card) 31'; Anyora (yellow card) 31'; Myrestam (yellow card) 45+2'; Bjørnbak (yellow card) 54'; Stølås 74'	Stadium: Aspmyra Stadion; Attendance: 2,907; Referee: Trond Ivar Døvle

16 May 2014 9	Brann	1–2	Bodø/Glimt	Bergen
18:00 CEST (UTC+2)	Barmen (yellow card) 70'; Lorentzen 87'	Report	Olsen 35'; Sané (yellow card) 44'; Chatto (yellow card) 69'; Badou 61'	Stadium: Brann Stadion; Attendance: 17,032; Referee: Svein Oddvar Moen

20 May 2014 10	Bodø/Glimt	2–1	Start	Bodø
18:00 CEST (UTC+2)	Laajab 45', 80'	Report	Andersen 36'; Berger (yellow card) 59'	Stadium: Aspmyra Stadion; Attendance: 2,912; Referee: Svein-Erik Edvartsen

25 May 2014 11	Viking	2–3	Bodø/Glimt	Stavanger
18:00 CEST (UTC+2)	Sverrisson 19'; Nisja 45+1'	Report	N'Diaye 26' (yellow card) 45+3'; Karlsen 50', 63'; Laajab (yellow card) 83'; Olsen (yellow card) 84'; Sané (yellow card) 90+4'	Stadium: Viking Stadion; Attendance: 9,682; Referee: Brage Sandmoen

9 June 2014 12	Sandnes Ulf	1–0	Bodø/Glimt	Sandnes
18:00 CEST (UTC+2)	Langås 16'; Rashkaj (yellow card) 63'	Report		Stadium: Sandnes Idrettspark; Attendance: 2,910; Referee: Trygve Kjensli

12 June 2014 13	Bodø/Glimt	1–1	Molde	Bodø
18:00 CEST (UTC+2)	O.M.Rindarøy 61' (o.g.)	Report	Toivio 15'; Gulbrandsen (yellow card) 64'	Stadium: Aspmyra Stadion; Attendance: 3,305; Referee: Ola Hobber Nilsen

6 July 2014 14	Sarpsborg 08	2–1	Bodø/Glimt	Sarpsborg
18:00 CEST (UTC+2)	Zajić 22'; Hansen (yellow card) 67'; Wiig 86'	Report	Sané (yellow card) 57'; Badou 66'; Brix (yellow card) 78'	Stadium: Sarpsborg Stadion; Attendance: 3,559; Referee: Martin Lundby

12 July 2014 15	Bodø/Glimt	0–3	Odd	Bodø
18:00 CEST (UTC+2)		Report	Shala (yellow card) 31'; Eriksen (yellow card) 41'; Samuelsen 69'; Rashani 72'; Halvorsen 78'	Stadium: Aspmyra Stadion; Attendance: 2,813; Referee: Trond Ivar Døvle

19 July 2014 16	Start	2–1	Bodø/Glimt	Kristiansand
15:30 CEST (UTC+2)	Vikstøl (yellow card) 42'; Owello (yellow card) 52'; Acosta (yellow card) 59'; Sané 72' (o.g.); Asante 90+3'	Report	Badou (yellow card) 45+1'; Laajab 56'	Stadium: Sør Arena; Attendance: 5,304; Referee: Dag Vidar Hafsås

27 July 2014 17	Bodø/Glimt	3–4	Sarpsborg 08	Bodø
18:00 CEST (UTC+2)	Laajab 6', 57' (pen.); Badou 36'; Moe (yellow card) 54'; Richards (yellow card) 61'	Report	Zajić 31'; Jensen 51'; Kronberg 81' (pen.) (yellow card) 87'; Þórarinsson 85'	Stadium: Aspmyra Stadion; Attendance: 2,841; Referee: Kristoffer Helgerud

3 August 2014 18	Aalesund	2–1	Bodø/Glimt	Ålesund
18:00 CEST (UTC+2)	Barrantes 45'; James 60'	Report	Grytebust 82' (o.g.); N'Diaye (yellow card) 86'	Stadium: Color Line Stadion; Attendance: 6,747; Referee: Tore Hansen

10 August 2014 19	Sogndal	0–1	Bodø/Glimt	Sogndalsfjøra
18:00 CEST (UTC+2)	Ofere (yellow card) 90+2'	Report	Chatto (yellow card) 47' (goal) 87'	Stadium: Fosshaugane Campus; Attendance: 3,071; Referee: Ken Henry Johnsen

17 August 2014 20	Bodø/Glimt	1–1	Sandnes Ulf	Bodø
18:00 CEST (UTC+2)	Laajab (yellow card) 45'; Badou 85'	Report	Jaiteh (yellow card) 39'; Brenes 55'; Aanestad (yellow card) 60'	Stadium: Aspmyra Stadion; Attendance: 3,304; Referee: Trygve Kjensli

24 August 2014 21	Haugesund	1–2	Bodø/Glimt	Haugesund
18:00 CEST (UTC+2)	Gytkjær 59'	Report	Badou 10'; Olsen 43'	Stadium: Haugesund Stadion; Attendance: 4,839; Referee: Tommy Skjerven

30 August 2014 22	Bodø/Glimt	4–3	Vålerenga	Bodø
20:00 CEST (UTC+2)	N'Diaye 11'; Olsen 28' (yellow card) 84'; Laajab 49' (pen.), 65'	Report	Zahid (yellow card) 5'; Larsen 7'; Grindheim 17', 60' (yellow card) 87'	Stadium: Aspmyra Stadion; Attendance: 3,136; Referee: Dag Vidar Hafsås

12 September 2014 23	Rosenborg	3–1	Bodø/Glimt	Trondheim
19:00 CET (UTC+1)	Svensson (yellow card) 41'; Jensen (yellow card) 57'; Riski 66'; Helland 74' (pen.); Malec 90+3'	Report	Olsen 50'	Stadium: Lerkendal Stadion; Attendance: 14,327; Referee: Svein-Erik Edvartsen

20 September 2014 24	Bodø/Glimt	0–4	Strømsgodset	Bodø
15:30 CEST (UTC+2)	Sané (red card) 2'; Chatto (yellow card) 50'; Brix (yellow card) 55'	Report	Sørum 3' (pen.), 60'; Fossum 82'; Wikheim (yellow card) 84'; Kastrati 86' (yellow card) 90+2'	Stadium: Aspmyra Stadion; Attendance: 2,972; Referee: Brage Sandmoen

27 September 2014 25	Molde	2–1	Bodø/Glimt	Molde
15:30 CEST (UTC+2)	Gulbrandsen 12'; Singh (yellow card) 24' (goal) 79' (pen.); Høiland (yellow card) 90+4'	Report	Laajab 49'; Londak (red card) 77'; Chatto (yellow card) 90+4'	Stadium: Aker Stadion; Attendance: 8,411; Referee: Ken Henry Johnsen

5 October 2014 26	Bodø/Glimt	1–1	Stabæk	Bodø
18:00 CEST (UTC+2)	Moe 37'; Berntsen (yellow card) 77'; Olsen (yellow card) 82'	Report	Skjønsberg (yellow card) 44'; Jacobson (yellow card) 44'; Jalasto (yellow card) 72' (goal) 90+1'; Trondsen (yellow card) 85'	Stadium: Aspmyra Stadion; Attendance: 3,928; Referee: Tore Hansen

19 October 2014 27	Odd	4–3	Bodø/Glimt	Skien
18:00 CEST (UTC+2)	Bentley 21'; Shala 35'; Johnsen 58', 83'; Samuelsen (yellow card) 72'	Report	Richards 13' (yellow card) 89'; Sané (yellow card) 24'; Badou 45+1', 62'	Stadium: Skagerak Arena; Attendance: 6,704; Referee: Tommy Skjerven

26 October 2014 28	Bodø/Glimt	2–1	Brann	Bodø
20:00 CEST (UTC+2)	Moe (yellow card) 24'; Laajab 32', 42' (pen.); Jacobsen (yellow card) 85'	Report	Askar (yellow card) 9'; Mojsov 64'; Pedersen (yellow card) 90+3'	Stadium: Aspmyra Stadion; Attendance: 4,038; Referee: Svein-Erik Edvartsen

2 November 2014 29	Lillestrøm	4–0	Bodø/Glimt	Lillestrøm
18:00 CET (UTC+1)	Friday 12', 83'; Fofana 13'; Pálmason 90'	Report	Braaten (yellow card) 28'; Berntsen (yellow card) 72'	Stadium: Åråsen Stadion; Attendance: 4,840; Referee: Trygve Kjensli

9 November 2014 30	Bodø/Glimt	3–2	Viking	Bodø
18:00 CET (UTC+1)	Moe 50'; Konradsen 54'; Laajab 74'	Report	Nisja 44'; Sané 71' (o.g.)	Stadium: Aspmyra Stadion; Attendance: 2,533; Referee: Dag Vidar Hafsås

==== Table ====
Pos	Team	Pld	W	D	L	GF	GA	GD	Pts	Qualification or relegation
11	Haugesund	30	10	6	14	43	49	−6	36	
12	Start	30	10	5	15	47	60	−13	35	
13	Bodø/Glimt	30	10	5	15	45	60	−15	35	
14	Brann (R)	30	8	5	17	41	54	−13	29	Qualification for the relegation play-offs
15	Sogndal (R)	30	6	6	18	31	49	−18	24	Relegation to First Division

Source: fotball.no
Rules for classification: 1) points; 2) goal difference; 3) number of goals scored.
(R) Relegated

=== Norwegian Cup ===
24 April 2014 First Round	Tverlandet	0–5	Bodø/Glimt	Løding
18:00 CEST (UTC+2)		Report	N'Diaye 24', 86'; Moe 39'; Berglann 78', 88'	Stadium: Tverlandet Kunstgress; Attendance: 900; Referee: Øystein Havig

8 May 2014 Second Round	Mo	1–3	Bodø/Glimt	Mo i Rana
18:00 CEST (UTC+2)	N.Bakksjø 78'	Report	N'Diaye 9', 17'; Johansen (yellow card) 40'; Badou (yellow card) 50'; Konradsen 88'	Stadium: Moheia Kunstgress; Attendance: 850; Referee: Peder Andre Amundsen

5 June 2014 Third Round	Tromsø	1–2	Bodø/Glimt	Tromsø
18:00 CEST (UTC+2)	Espejord 15'; Johansen (yellow card) 36'	Report	Laajab (yellow card) 11'; Jacobsen (yellow card) 40'; Olsen 45' (yellow card) 72'; Sané 64'	Stadium: Alfheim Stadion; Attendance: 3,530; Referee: Espen Berntsen

23 July 2014 Fourth Round	Bodø/Glimt	0–2	Stabæk	Bodø
19:00 CEST (UTC+2)	Imingen (red card) 83'	Report	Kassi 30' (yellow card) 67'; Boli (yellow card) 37'; Skjønsberg (yellow card) 70'; Adu 84' (pen.)	Stadium: Aspmyra Stadion; Attendance: 1,699; Referee: Tom Harald Hagen

== Squad statistics ==
As of match played 9 November 2014

=== Appearances and goals ===
No.	Pos	Nat	Player	Total		Tippeligaen		Norwegian Cup	
No.	Pos	Nat	Player	Apps	Goals	Apps	Goals	Apps	Goals
1	GK	(Estonia) EST	Pavel Londak	18	0	18	0	0	0
2	DF	(Norway) NOR	Ruben Imingen	20	0	17+1	0	2	0
3	DF	(United States) USA	Zarek Valentin	3	0	2+1	0	0	0
4	DF	(Norway) NOR	Thomas Braaten	22	0	19+1	0	2	0
5	MF	(Norway) NOR	Thomas Jacobsen	29	0	20+5	0	2+2	0
6	MF	(Norway) NOR	Anders Karlsen	24	2	6+14	2	3+1	0
7	MF	(Senegal) SEN	Badou	32	9	30	9	2	0
8	MF	(Norway) NOR	Daniel Berntsen	10	0	10	0	0	0
10	FW	(Norway) NOR	Ibba Laajab	33	13	30	13	2+1	0
14	MF	(Norway) NOR	Ulrik Saltnes	10	0	2+5	0	3	0
15	MF	(Nigeria) NGA	Dominic Chatto	26	2	25	2	1	0
16	MF	(Norway) NOR	Morten Konradsen	20	2	5+11	1	1+3	1
17	MF	(Norway) NOR	Mathias Normann	1	0	0	0	0+1	0
18	DF	(Norway) NOR	Brede Moe	30	3	25+1	2	4	1
19	FW	(Senegal) SEN	Mouhamadou N'Diaye	31	8	12+15	4	3+1	4
20	FW	(Norway) NOR	Ulrik Berglann	11	1	2+6	0	2+1	1
23	DF	(Senegal) SEN	Vieux Sané	31	2	27	1	4	1
24	DF	(Norway) NOR	Kristian Brix	32	0	25+3	0	4	0
25	GK	(Norway) NOR	Lasse Staw	18	0	12+2	0	4	0
27	MF	(Norway) NOR	Patrick Berg	2	0	0+1	0	0+1	0
28	MF	(Jamaica) JAM	Dane Richards	23	4	14+8	3	1	1
30	FW	(Norway) NOR	Trond Olsen	30	7	28	6	2	1
Players away from Bodø/Glimt on loan:
9	FW	(Norway) NOR	Jim Johansen	8	0	1+5	0	2	0
Players who appeared for Bodø/Glimt no longer at the club:

=== Goal scorers ===
Place	Position	Nation	Number	Name	Tippeligaen	Norwegian Cup	Total
1	FW	(Norway)	10	Ibba Laajab	13	0	13
2	MF	(Senegal)	7	Badou	9	0	9
3	FW	(Senegal)	19	Mouhamadou N'Diaye	4	4	8
4	FW	(Norway)	30	Trond Olsen	6	1	7
5	FW	(Jamaica)	28	Dane Richards	3	0	3
5	DF	(Norway)	18	Brede Moe	1	2	3
7	MF	(Norway)	6	Anders Karlsen	2	0	2
7	MF	(Nigeria)	15	Dominic Chatto	2	0	2
7	DF	(Senegal)	23	Vieux Sané	1	1	2
7	MF	(Norway)	16	Morten Konradsen	1	1	2
7				Own goal	2	0	2
12	FW	(Norway)	20	Ulrik Berglann	0	1	1
				TOTALS	45	10	55

=== Clean sheets ===
Place	Position	Nation	Number	Name	Tippeligaen	Norwegian Cup	Total
1	GK	(Estonia)	1	Pavel Londak	1	0	1
1	GK	(Norway)	25	Lasse Staw	0	1	1
				TOTALS	1	1	2

=== Disciplinary record ===
Number	Nation	Position	Name	Tippeligaen		Norwegian Cup		Total	
Number	Nation	Position	Name	Booked	Sent off (straight red)	Booked	Sent off (straight red)	Booked	Sent off (straight red)
1	(Estonia)	GK	Pavel Londak	0	1	0	0	0	1
2	(Norway)	DF	Ruben Imingen	0	0	0	1	0	1
4	(Norway)	DF	Thomas Braaten	1	0	0	0	1	0
5	(Norway)	DF	Thomas Jacobsen	1	0	1	0	2	0
6	(Norway)	MF	Anders Karlsen	1	0	0	0	1	0
7	(Senegal)	MF	Badou	2	0	1	0	3	0
8	(Norway)	MF	Daniel Berntsen	2	0	0	0	2	0
10	(Norway)	FW	Ibba Laajab	2	0	1	0	3	0
15	(Nigeria)	MF	Dominic Chatto	5	0	0	0	5	0
18	(Norway)	DF	Brede Moe	3	0	0	0	3	0
19	(Senegal)	FW	Mouhamadou N'Diaye	4	0	0	0	4	0
23	(Senegal)	DF	Vieux Sané	6	1	0	0	6	1
24	(Norway)	DF	Kristian Brix	4	0	0	0	4	0
28	(Jamaica)	MF	Dane Richards	2	0	0	0	2	0
30	(Norway)	FW	Trond Olsen	3	0	1	0	4	0
Players away on loan:
9	(Norway)	FW	Jim Johansen	1	0	1	0	2	0
			TOTALS	37	1	5	1	42	2
