= List of Norwegian football transfers winter 2015–16 =

This is a list of Norwegian football transfers in the winter transfer window 2015-16 by club. Only clubs of the 2016 Tippeligaen and 2016 Norwegian First Division is included.

== 2016 Tippeligaen ==
=== Bodø/Glimt ===
In: Note: Flags indicate national team as defined under FIFA eligibility rules; some limited exceptions apply. Players may hold more than one non-FIFA nationality.

| No. | Pos. | Nation | Player |
|---|---|---|---|
| 1 | GK | CAN | Simon Thomas (from (Norway) Strømmen) |
| 3 | DF | NOR | Emil Jonassen (from (Norway) Odd) |
| 4 | DF | NOR | Martin Bjørnbak (from (Norway) Haugesund) |
| 9 | FW | NOR | Martin Wiig (free agent) |
| 10 | MF | UKR | Ruslan Babenko (free agent) |
| 11 | FW | SRB | Milan Jevtović (on loan from (Austria) LASK Linz) |
| 17 | MF | NOR | Mathias Normann (loan return from (Norway) Alta) |
| 22 | DF | NOR | Martin Pedersen (loan return from (Norway) Finnsnes) |
| 25 | GK | ISL | Hannes Þór Halldórsson (on loan from (Netherlands) NEC) |
| 28 | FW | NOR | William Arne Hanssen (Promoted) |
| 31 | MF | NOR | Jens Petter Hauge (Promoted) |

Out: Note: Flags indicate national team as defined under FIFA eligibility rules; some limited exceptions apply. Players may hold more than one non-FIFA nationality.

| No. | Pos. | Nation | Player |
|---|---|---|---|
| 1 | GK | EST | Pavel Londak (released) |
| 3 | DF | USA | Zarek Valentin (to (United States) Portland Timbers) |
| 9 | FW | NOR | Jim Johansen (released) |
| 11 | FW | NOR | Alexander Sørloth (loan return to (Norway) Rosenborg, later to (Netherlands) Groningen) |
| 12 | GK | NOR | Jonas Ueland Kolstad (retired) |
| 15 | MF | NGA | Dominic Chatto (released) |
| 19 | MF | NOR | Erik Tønne (released) |
| 20 | FW | NOR | Ulrik Berglann (to (Norway) Jerv, previously on loan at (Norway) Strømmen) |
| 23 | DF | SEN | Vieux Sané (to (France) Stade Brestois) |
| 24 | DF | NOR | Kristian Brix (released) |
| 25 | GK | NOR | Lasse Staw (released) |
| 26 | MF | USA | Danny Cruz (loan return to (United States) Philadelphia Union) |
| 29 | DF | NOR | Vebjørn Vinje (on loan to (Norway) Mo) |

=== Brann ===
In: Note: Flags indicate national team as defined under FIFA eligibility rules; some limited exceptions apply. Players may hold more than one non-FIFA nationality.

| No. | Pos. | Nation | Player |
|---|---|---|---|
| 10 | FW | SWE | Jakob Orlov (loan return from (Sweden) Hammarby) |
| 16 | MF | NOR | Remi Johansen (free agent) |
| 19 | FW | CRC | Deyver Vega (from (Costa Rica) Deportivo Saprissa) |
| 22 | FW | DEN | Mads Dittmer Hvilsom (on loan from (Germany) Eintracht Braunschweig) |
| 25 | FW | NOR | Daniel Braaten (free agent) |
| 26 | DF | FIN | Dani Hatakka (from (Finland) KuPS) |

Out: Note: Flags indicate national team as defined under FIFA eligibility rules; some limited exceptions apply. Players may hold more than one non-FIFA nationality.

| No. | Pos. | Nation | Player |
|---|---|---|---|
| 3 | DF | NOR | Erlend Hanstveit (retired) |
| 4 | MF | NOR | Eirik Birkelund (released) |
| 11 | FW | CRC | Alejandro Castro (loan return to (Norway) Start, later released) |
| 12 | GK | NOR | Kenneth Udjus (released) |
| 12 | GK | NOR | Øystein Øvretveit (released, previously on at (Norway) Nest-Sotra) |
| 14 | DF | NOR | Fredrik Heggland (on loan to (Norway) Fana) |
| 22 | MF | ETH | Amin Askar (to (Turkey) Şanlıurfaspor, previously on loan at (Norway) Sarpsborg 08) |
| 25 | MF | LBR | Amadaiya Rennie (loan return to (Sweden) Hammarby) |
| 30 | DF | NOR | Fredrik Pallesen Knudsen (on loan to (Norway) Åsane) |

=== Haugesund ===
In: Note: Flags indicate national team as defined under FIFA eligibility rules; some limited exceptions apply. Players may hold more than one non-FIFA nationality.

| No. | Pos. | Nation | Player |
|---|---|---|---|
| 4 | DF | SRB | Nemanja Tubić (free agent) |
| 8 | MF | NOR | Sondre Tronstad (from (England) Huddersfield Town) |
| 10 | MF | NOR | Roy Miljeteig (from (Norway) Vard Haugesund) |
| 12 | GK | NOR | Helge Sandvik (from (Norway) Vard Haugesund) |
| 15 | DF | NGA | Anthony Izuchukwu (from (Nigeria) Golden Booth Soccer Academy) |
| 16 | MF | GHA | Derrick Mensah (from (Czech Republic) Baník Ostrava) |
| 17 | FW | NGA | Ibrahim Shuaibu (from (Nigeria) Golden Booth Soccer Academy) |
| 20 | FW | GHA | Kwame Karikari (from (Sweden) Halmstad) |
| 23 | MF | BIH | Haris Hajradinović (on loan from (Belgium) Gent) |

Out: Note: Flags indicate national team as defined under FIFA eligibility rules; some limited exceptions apply. Players may hold more than one non-FIFA nationality.

| No. | Pos. | Nation | Player |
|---|---|---|---|
| 1 | GK | NOR | Per Morten Kristiansen (released) |
| 4 | DF | CRO | Mirko Kramarić (released) |
| 7 | FW | DEN | Christian Gytkjær (to (Norway) Rosenborg) |
| 8 | MF | NOR | Michael Haukås (released) |
| 9 | FW | SRB | Nikola Komazec (released) |
| 10 | DF | NOR | Joakim Våge Nilsen (released) |
| 15 | DF | NOR | Martin Bjørnbak (to (Norway) Bodø/Glimt) |
| 16 | MF | NGA | Sad'eeq Yusuf (loan return to (Belgium) Genk) |
| 17 | MF | DEN | Søren Christensen (released) |
| 20 | FW | SEN | Simon Diedhiou (to (Belgium) Gent) |
| 21 | FW | NGA | Adamu Abubakar (released) |
| 23 | MF | BRA | Daniel Bamberg (released) |
| 30 | FW | NOR | Erling Flotve Myklebust (on loan to (Norway) Stord) |
| — | FW | FIN | Roope Riski (to (Finland) SJK Seinäjoki, previously on loan) |

=== Lillestrøm ===
In: Note: Flags indicate national team as defined under FIFA eligibility rules; some limited exceptions apply. Players may hold more than one non-FIFA nationality.

| No. | Pos. | Nation | Player |
|---|---|---|---|
| 5 | DF | NOR | Ole Martin Rindarøy (on loan from (Norway) Molde, previously on loan at (Norway) Start) |
| 7 | MF | LBN | Bassel Jradi (on loan from (Norway) Strømsgodset) |
| 15 | MF | NOR | Erik Næsbak Brenden (from (Norway) Nybergsund) |
| 21 | MF | NOR | Petter Mathias Olsen (Promoted) |
| 22 | DF | DEN | Michael Jakobsen (on loan from (Denmark) Esbjerg) |
| 29 | GK | NOR | Emil Ødegaard (Promoted) |

Out: Note: Flags indicate national team as defined under FIFA eligibility rules; some limited exceptions apply. Players may hold more than one non-FIFA nationality.

| No. | Pos. | Nation | Player |
|---|---|---|---|
| 2 | DF | NED | Michael Timisela (released) |
| 5 | DF | FIN | Lum Rexhepi (to (Finland) HJK Helsinki) |
| 6 | MF | ISL | Finnur Orri Margeirsson (to (Iceland) KR) |
| 7 | MF | SWE | Johan Andersson (released) |
| 14 | MF | NOR | Fredrik Krogstad (on loan to (Norway) Ull/Kisa) |
| 19 | FW | NOR | Joachim Osvold (released) |
| 20 | DF | NOR | Stian Ringstad (to (Portugal) Braga) |
| 22 | DF | NOR | Simen Nordermoen (released) |
| 27 | FW | NOR | Markus Brændsrød (on loan to (Norway) Strømmen) |

=== Molde ===
In: Note: Flags indicate national team as defined under FIFA eligibility rules; some limited exceptions apply. Players may hold more than one non-FIFA nationality.

| No. | Pos. | Nation | Player |
|---|---|---|---|
| 7 | MF | NOR | Harmeet Singh (from (Denmark) Midtjylland) |
| 14 | MF | NOR | Petter Strand (from (Norway) Sogndal) |
| 16 | MF | LBR | Dulee Johnson (from (Norway) Moss) |
| 17 | MF | NOR | Fredrik Aursnes (from (Norway) Hødd) |
| 18 | DF | FIN | Roni Peiponen (from (Finland) HJK Helsinki) |
| 20 | FW | CMR | Thomas Amang (free agent) |
| 22 | FW | ISL | Eiður Guðjohnsen (free agent) |
| 28 | MF | NOR | Stian Rode Gregersen (loan return from (Norway) Kristiansund) |
| 30 | FW | SEN | Pape Paté Diouf (loan return from (Norway) Odd) |
| 31 | FW | USA | Ben Spencer (loan return from (Canada) Toronto FC II) |
| 32 | DF | SWE | Isak Ssewankambo (from (England) Derby County) |
| — | MF | NGA | Thompson Ekpe |

Out: Note: Flags indicate national team as defined under FIFA eligibility rules; some limited exceptions apply. Players may hold more than one non-FIFA nationality.

| No. | Pos. | Nation | Player |
|---|---|---|---|
| 2 | DF | NOR | Fredrik Semb Berge (loan return to (Denmark) Brøndby) |
| 3 | MF | SEN | Amidou Diop (on loan to (Norway) Kristiansund) |
| 6 | MF | NOR | Daniel Berg Hestad (retired) |
| 7 | MF | NOR | Harmeet Singh (released) |
| 10 | MF | NOR | Thomas Kind Bendiksen (on loan to (Sweden) Elfsborg, previously on loan at (Norway) Tromsø) |
| 11 | FW | NOR | Ola Kamara (loan return to Austria Wien) |
| 14 | DF | NOR | Martin Linnes (to (Turkey) Galatasaray) |
| 16 | MF | NOR | Etzaz Hussain (to (Turkey) Sivasspor) |
| 18 | DF | FIN | Roni Peiponen (on loan to (Norway) Åsane) |
| 18 | DF | NOR | Magne Simonsen (released) |
| 20 | FW | NOR | Tommy Høiland (released) |
| 33 | MF | NOR | Andreas Hollingen (to (Norway) Start, previously on loan) |
| 37 | DF | NOR | Ole Martin Rindarøy (on loan to (Norway) Lillestrøm, previously on loan at (Norway) Start) |

=== Odd ===
In: Note: Flags indicate national team as defined under FIFA eligibility rules; some limited exceptions apply. Players may hold more than one non-FIFA nationality.

| No. | Pos. | Nation | Player |
|---|---|---|---|
| 9 | FW | NOR | Henrik Kjelsrud Johansen (loan return from (Norway) Fredrikstad) |
| 15 | FW | NOR | Sigurd Haugen (from (Norway) Sandnes Ulf) |
| 16 | DF | NOR | Fredrik Semb Berge (from (Denmark) Brøndby) |
| 17 | MF | NOR | Eric Kitolano (Promoted) |
| 18 | DF | NOR | Joakim Våge Nilsen (free agent) |
| 19 | MF | CAN | Zakaria Messoudi (free agent) |
| 22 | MF | NOR | Erik Eikeng (Promoted) |

Out: Note: Flags indicate national team as defined under FIFA eligibility rules; some limited exceptions apply. Players may hold more than one non-FIFA nationality.

| No. | Pos. | Nation | Player |
|---|---|---|---|
| 9 | FW | SEN | Pape Paté Diouf (loan return to (Norway) Molde) |
| 11 | FW | NOR | Frode Johnsen (retired) |
| 12 | FW | NOR | Ulrik Flo (released) |
| 16 | MF | NOR | Jonathan Lindseth (released) |
| 18 | DF | FIN | Jarkko Hurme (to (Finland) SJK Seinäjoki) |
| 19 | DF | NOR | Emil Jonassen (to (Norway) Bodø/Glimt) |
| 22 | MF | NOR | Håvard Storbæk (to (Norway) Sandefjord) |
| 25 | MF | NOR | Mathias Fredriksen (to (Norway) Mjøndalen) |

=== Rosenborg ===
In: Note: Flags indicate national team as defined under FIFA eligibility rules; some limited exceptions apply. Players may hold more than one non-FIFA nationality.

| No. | Pos. | Nation | Player |
|---|---|---|---|
| 9 | FW | DEN | Christian Gytkjær (from (Norway) Haugesund) |
| 15 | FW | NOR | Elba Rashani (on loan from (Kosovo) Brøndby) |
| 20 | DF | AUS | Alex Gersbach (from (Australia) Sydney FC) |
| 24 | FW | FIN | Riku Riski (loan return from (Scotland) Dundee United) |
| 28 | MF | ISL | Guðmundur Þórarinsson (from (Denmark) Nordsjælland) |
| 30 | GK | EST | Pavel Londak (free agent) |

Out: Note: Flags indicate national team as defined under FIFA eligibility rules; some limited exceptions apply. Players may hold more than one non-FIFA nationality.

| No. | Pos. | Nation | Player |
|---|---|---|---|
| 8 | MF | NOR | Morten Gamst Pedersen (released) |
| 9 | FW | FIN | Riku Riski (on loan to (Scotland) Dundee United, previously on loan at (Sweden) Göteborg) |
| 11 | FW | DEN | Tobias Mikkelsen (to (Denmark) Nordsjælland) |
| 15 | FW | NOR | Alexander Søderlund (to (France) Saint-Étienne) |
| 20 | MF | NOR | Ole Kristian Selnæs (to (France) Saint-Étienne) |
| 37 | FW | NOR | Alexander Sørloth (to (Netherlands) Groningen, previously on loan to (Norway) Bodø/Glimt) |

=== Sarpsborg 08 ===
In: Note: Flags indicate national team as defined under FIFA eligibility rules; some limited exceptions apply. Players may hold more than one non-FIFA nationality.

| No. | Pos. | Nation | Player |
|---|---|---|---|
| 1 | GK | NOR | Arild Østbø (from (Norway) Viking) |
| 2 | DF | NOR | Brice Wembangomo (loan return from (Norway) Kvik Halden) |
| 3 | DF | FIN | Henri Toivomäki (free agent) |
| 5 | MF | DEN | Matti Lund Nielsen (from (Denmark) OB) |
| 7 | FW | NOR | Pål Alexander Kirkevold (on loan from (Denmark) Hobro) |
| 10 | MF | SWE | Jonas Lindberg (free agent) |
| 18 | MF | NOR | Tor Øyvind Hovda (from (Sweden) Kalmar) |
| 19 | DF | ISL | Kristinn Jónsson (from (Iceland) Breiðablik) |
| 20 | DF | NOR | Anders Østli (free agent) |
| 21 | GK | NOR | Anders Kristiansen (from (Norway) Bryne) |
| 22 | MF | NOR | Jon-Helge Tveita (from (Norway) Bryne) |
| 23 | DF | NOR | Jakob Glesnes (from (Norway) Åsane) |
| 85 | FW | FRA | Alexy Bosetti (on loan from (France) Nice, previously on loan at (France) Tours) |
| — | FW | NOR | Jørgen Strand Larsen (Promoted) |

Out: Note: Flags indicate national team as defined under FIFA eligibility rules; some limited exceptions apply. Players may hold more than one non-FIFA nationality.

| No. | Pos. | Nation | Player |
|---|---|---|---|
| 1 | GK | DEN | Lasse Heinze (loan return to (Denmark) Midtjylland, later retired) |
| 3 | DF | NOR | Andreas Nordvik (to (Denmark) Esbjerg) |
| 5 | MF | NOR | Olav Øby (on loan to (Norway) Strømmen, previously on loan at (Norway) Follo) |
| 7 | FW | NOR | Martin Wiig (released) |
| 10 | MF | NED | Barry Maguire (released) |
| 14 | FW | NOR | Badr Rahhaoui (released, previously on loan at (Norway) Kvik Halden) |
| 19 | DF | ALG | Habib Bellaïd (released) |
| 20 | MF | NOR | Simen Brenne (released) |
| 23 | MF | NOR | Tom Erik Breive (released) |
| 25 | MF | NOR | Martin Hoel Andersen (to (Norway) Kvik Halden, previously on loan) |
| 26 | DF | NOR | Martin Thømt Jensen (to (Norway) Fredrikstad) |
| 27 | GK | JAM | Duwayne Kerr (released) |
| 28 | FW | HUN | Péter Kovács (to (Norway) Sandefjord) |
| 31 | GK | NOR | Christian Sukke (to (Norway) Moss, previously on loan at (Norway) Ull/Kisa) |
| 36 | MF | SRB | Bojan Zajić (released) |
| 77 | MF | ETH | Amin Askar (loan return to (Norway) Brann) |
| 92 | MF | NOR | Kamer Qaka (on loan to (Norway) Kristiansund) |

=== Sogndal ===
In: Note: Flags indicate national team as defined under FIFA eligibility rules; some limited exceptions apply. Players may hold more than one non-FIFA nationality.

| No. | Pos. | Nation | Player |
|---|---|---|---|
| 10 | FW | GHA | Gilbert Koomson (from (Thailand) BEC Tero Sasana) |
| 11 | FW | NOR | Martin Ramsland (from (Norway) Strømmen) |
| 15 | DF | FIN | Jukka Raitala (free agent) |
| 19 | MF | NOR | Ole Amund Sveen (from (Norway) Hødd) |
| 26 | DF | DEN | Magnus Pedersen (on loan from (Denmark) OB) |
| 27 | MF | NOR | Eirik Birkelund (free agent) |
| — | MF | NOR | Eirik Bakke (from retirement) |

Out: Note: Flags indicate national team as defined under FIFA eligibility rules; some limited exceptions apply. Players may hold more than one non-FIFA nationality.

| No. | Pos. | Nation | Player |
|---|---|---|---|
| 6 | MF | NOR | Peter Aase (on loan to (Norway) Åsane) |
| 10 | MF | NOR | Thomas Drage (released) |
| 11 | FW | NGA | Osita Henry Chikere (released) |
| 15 | MF | NOR | Petter Strand (to (Norway) Molde) |
| 23 | MF | NOR | Edin Øy (on loan to (Norway) Førde) |
| 24 | DF | NOR | Eirik Bergum Skaasheim (on loan to (Norway) Hødd) |
| — | DF | NOR | Sindre Austevoll (to (Norway) Åsane) |
| — | FW | NOR | Kristoffer Ryland (on loan to (Norway) Florø) |

=== Stabæk ===
In: Note: Flags indicate national team as defined under FIFA eligibility rules; some limited exceptions apply. Players may hold more than one non-FIFA nationality.

| No. | Pos. | Nation | Player |
|---|---|---|---|
| 10 | FW | ALB | Agon Mehmeti (from (Sweden) Malmö) |
| 11 | MF | NOR | Moussa Njie (from (Norway) Bærum) |
| 16 | DF | NOR | Andreas Hanche-Olsen (from junior squad) |
| 17 | DF | SCO | Alex Davey (on loan from (England) Chelsea) |
| 19 | MF | GHA | Shadrach Eghan (loan from (Netherlands) Twente) |
| 23 | MF | NOR | Emil Bohinen (from junior squad) |
| 99 | FW | NOR | Ohi Omoijuanfo (from (Norway) Jerv) |

Out: Note: Flags indicate national team as defined under FIFA eligibility rules; some limited exceptions apply. Players may hold more than one non-FIFA nationality.

| No. | Pos. | Nation | Player |
|---|---|---|---|
| 6 | MF | GHA | Anthony Annan (released) |
| 6 | MF | NOR | Emil Dahle (to (Norway) HamKam, previously on loan at (Norway) Bryne) |
| 11 | MF | BEL | Yassine El Ghanassy (to (Belgium) KV Oostende) |
| 14 | FW | NOR | Emil Ekblom (on loan to (Norway) KFUM Oslo) |
| 15 | DF | FIN | Ville Jalasto (to (Finland) HJK) |
| 16 | DF | DEN | Thor Lange (released, previously on loan at (Norway) Strømmen) |
| 18 | MF | NZL | Craig Henderson (released, previously on loan at (Norway) Mjøndalen) |
| 77 | FW | NOR | Muhamed Keita (loan return to (Poland) Lech Poznan) |

=== Start ===
In: Note: Flags indicate national team as defined under FIFA eligibility rules; some limited exceptions apply. Players may hold more than one non-FIFA nationality.

| No. | Pos. | Nation | Player |
|---|---|---|---|
| 2 | DF | NOR | Jens Kristian Skogmo (from (Norway) Follo) |
| 3 | DF | FIN | Tapio Heikkilä (from (Finland) SJK Seinäjoki) |
| 7 | MF | NGA | Chidiebere Nwakali (on loan from (England) Manchester City) |
| 9 | MF | NOR | Daniel Aase (from (Norway) Vindbjart, previously on loan) |
| 11 | FW | NGA | Uduak Cyril Idemokon (on loan from (Nigeria) Bujoc) |
| 15 | DF | NOR | Henrik Robstad (from (Norway) Jerv) |
| 16 | MF | NOR | Andreas Hollingen (from (Norway) Molde, previously on loan) |
| — | MF | NOR | Henrik Byklum (from (Norway) Randesund) |

Out: Note: Flags indicate national team as defined under FIFA eligibility rules; some limited exceptions apply. Players may hold more than one non-FIFA nationality.

| No. | Pos. | Nation | Player |
|---|---|---|---|
| 2 | DF | NOR | Jon Hodnemyr (to (Norway) Vindbjart) |
| 3 | DF | NOR | Ole Martin Rindarøy (loan return to (Norway) Molde) |
| 6 | MF | NOR | Kristoffer Ajer (to (Scotland) Celtic) |
| 11 | FW | CRC | Alejandro Castro (released, previously on loan at (Norway) Brann) |
| 15 | DF | DEN | Michael Christensen (released) |
| 18 | FW | NOR | Mads Stokkelien (released) |
| 20 | DF | NOR | John Olav Norheim (on loan to (Norway) KFUM Oslo, previously on loan at (Norway) Nest-Sotra) |
| 31 | MF | NOR | Joachim Eriksen (to (Norway) Fløy) |
| 33 | DF | NOR | Jørgen Hammer (to (Norway) KFUM Oslo) |
| — | MF | NOR | Henrik Byklum (on loan to (Norway) Fløy) |
| — | GK | ISL | Ingvar Jónsson (to (Norway) Sandefjord, previously on loan at (Norway) Sandnes Ulf) |

=== Strømsgodset ===
In: Note: Flags indicate national team as defined under FIFA eligibility rules; some limited exceptions apply. Players may hold more than one non-FIFA nationality.

| No. | Pos. | Nation | Player |
|---|---|---|---|
| 3 | DF | NOR | Jonathan Parr (from (England) Ipswich Town) |
| 7 | FW | NOR | Tommy Høiland (free agent) |
| 19 | MF | POR | Francisco Júnior (from (England) Everton F.C.) |
| 22 | MF | GHA | Nana (on loan from (England) Manchester City) |
| 40 | GK | NOR | Morten Sætra (Promoted) |
| 77 | MF | NOR | Muhamed Keita (on loan from (Poland) Lech Poznań) |
| 93 | FW | NOR | Tokmac Nguen (loan return from (Norway) Mjøndalen) |
| — | FW | NOR | Andreas Hoven (Promoted) |
| — | FW | NOR | Kristoffer Hoven (Promoted) |

Out: Note: Flags indicate national team as defined under FIFA eligibility rules; some limited exceptions apply. Players may hold more than one non-FIFA nationality.

| No. | Pos. | Nation | Player |
|---|---|---|---|
| 5 | DF | NOR | Jørgen Horn (to (Sweden) Elfsborg) |
| 6 | DF | FRA | Florent Hanin (released) |
| 7 | MF | LBN | Bassel Jradi (on loan to (Norway) Lillestrøm) |
| 12 | GK | NOR | Borger Thomas (on loan to (Norway) Nybergsund) |
| 13 | GK | NOR | Anders Gundersen (on loan to (Norway) Sandefjord) |
| 14 | MF | NOR | Iver Fossum (to (Germany) Hannover 96) |
| 17 | FW | NOR | Thomas Lehne Olsen (released) |
| 19 | FW | NOR | Gustav Wikheim (to (Belgium) Gent) |
| 21 | MF | NOR | Mathias Gjerstrøm (on loan to (Norway) Kongsvinger) |
| 22 | MF | GHA | Nana (loan return to (England) Manchester City) |
| 33 | FW | NGA | Marco Tagbajumi (loan return to (Cyprus) Limassol) |
| 75 | FW | BEL | Marvin Ogunjimi (to (South Korea) Suwon FC) |

=== Tromsø ===
In: Note: Flags indicate national team as defined under FIFA eligibility rules; some limited exceptions apply. Players may hold more than one non-FIFA nationality.

| No. | Pos. | Nation | Player |
|---|---|---|---|
| 7 | MF | NOR | Morten Gamst Pedersen (free agent) |
| 8 | MF | SWE | Jens Jacobsson (free agent) |
| 9 | FW | TUN | Sofien Moussa (from (Romania) Petrolul Ploiești) |
| 10 | FW | NOR | Thomas Lehne Olsen (free agent) |
| 12 | GK | CRO | Filip Lončarić (from (Bosnia and Herzegovina) Zrinjski Mostar) |
| 17 | MF | ISL | Aron Sigurðarson (from (Iceland) Fjölnir) |
| 20 | FW | NOR | Christer Johnsgård (from (Norway) Senja) |
| 26 | DF | NOR | Jostein Gundersen (Promoted) |
| 27 | MF | NOR | Fredrik Michalsen (Promoted) |

Out: Note: Flags indicate national team as defined under FIFA eligibility rules; some limited exceptions apply. Players may hold more than one non-FIFA nationality.

| No. | Pos. | Nation | Player |
|---|---|---|---|
| 1 | GK | SWE | Benny Lekström (to (Sweden) Sirius) |
| 5 | FW | NOR | Morten Moldskred (released) |
| 7 | MF | SWE | Marcus Hansson (to (Sweden) Djurgården) |
| 13 | FW | CZE | Zdeněk Ondrášek (released) |
| 16 | MF | NOR | Lars Gunnar Johnsen (to (Norway) Tromsdalen) |
| 17 | MF | NOR | Remi Johansen (released) |
| 21 | MF | NOR | Thomas Kind Bendiksen (loan return to (Norway) Molde) |
| 23 | GK | NOR | Pål Vestly Heigre (loan return to (Norway) Viking) |
| 29 | MF | NOR | Elias Skogvoll (to (Norway) Tromsdalen, previously on loan) |
| 48 | MF | CRO | Marin Oršulić (released) |

=== Viking ===
In: Note: Flags indicate national team as defined under FIFA eligibility rules; some limited exceptions apply. Players may hold more than one non-FIFA nationality.

| No. | Pos. | Nation | Player |
|---|---|---|---|
| 9 | FW | DEN | Patrick Pedersen (from (Iceland) Valur) |
| 16 | MF | NOR | Abdisalam Ibrahim (from (Greece) Veria) |
| 17 | FW | NGA | Aniekpeno Udoh (from (Nigeria) Akwa United) |
| 18 | DF | NOR | Julian Ryerson (Promoted) |
| 19 | MF | NOR | Michael Haukås (free agent) |
| 20 | FW | NOR | Tor André Aasheim (free agent) |
| 21 | MF | NOR | Herman Kleppa (Promoted) |
| 24 | GK | NOR | Pål Vestly Heigre (loan return from (Norway) Tromsø) |
| 25 | MF | NGA | Usman Sani Sale Hassan (from (Nigeria) Wikki Tourists) |
| 26 | DF | NOR | Erik Steen (Promoted) |
| 27 | MF | NOR | Mathias Bringaker (Promoted) |

Out: Note: Flags indicate national team as defined under FIFA eligibility rules; some limited exceptions apply. Players may hold more than one non-FIFA nationality.

| No. | Pos. | Nation | Player |
|---|---|---|---|
| 1 | GK | NOR | Arild Østbø (to (Norway) Sarpsborg 08) |
| 8 | MF | NOR | Vidar Nisja (released) |
| 10 | FW | ENG | Kieffer Moore (to (England) Forest Green Rovers) |
| 11 | MF | SEN | Makhtar Thioune (released) |
| 20 | DF | ISL | Indriði Sigurðsson (to (Iceland) KR) |
| 21 | MF | NOR | Julian Veen Uldal (to (Norway) Randaberg) |
| 23 | MF | ISL | Steinþór Freyr Þorsteinsson (on loan to (Norway) Sandnes Ulf) |
| 24 | DF | NOR | Aleksander Solli (released) |
| 29 | FW | NOR | Martin Hummervoll (on loan to (Iceland) ÍA) |
| 30 | MF | NOR | Stian Michalsen (on loan to (Norway) Sola) |

=== Vålerenga ===
In: Note: Flags indicate national team as defined under FIFA eligibility rules; some limited exceptions apply. Players may hold more than one non-FIFA nationality.

| No. | Pos. | Nation | Player |
|---|---|---|---|
| 1 | GK | SWE | Marcus Sandberg (from (Sweden) Göteborg) |
| 2 | DF | NOR | Niklas Gunnarsson (loan return from (Sweden) Elfsborg) |
| 3 | DF | EST | Enar Jääger (from (Estonia) Flora Tallinn, previously on loan) |
| 8 | DF | SWE | Jesper Arvidsson (from (Sweden) Djurgården) |
| 16 | MF | NOR | Vajebah Sakor (on loan from (Italy) Juventus) |
| 17 | MF | NOR | Niklas Castro (Promoted) |
| 18 | MF | NOR | Rino Falk Larsen (Promoted) |
| 21 | MF | NOR | Simen Juklerød (from (Norway) Bærum) |
| 30 | GK | NOR | Aslak Falch (free agent) |
| 33 | DF | NOR | Anders Nedrebø (from (Norway) Bærum) |
| — | MF | NOR | Brede Sandmoen (from (Norway) Holmen) |

Out: Note: Flags indicate national team as defined under FIFA eligibility rules; some limited exceptions apply. Players may hold more than one non-FIFA nationality.

| No. | Pos. | Nation | Player |
|---|---|---|---|
| 1 | GK | CAN | Lars Hirschfeld (released) |
| 2 | DF | NOR | Niklas Gunnarsson (on loan to (Scotland) Hibernian, previously on loan at (Sweden) Elfsborg) |
| 8 | MF | SWE | Melker Hallberg (loan return to (Italy) Udinese, later loaned to (Sweden) Hammarby) |
| 11 | MF | NOR | Morten Berre (retired) |
| 15 | DF | NOR | Markus Nakkim (on loan to (Norway) Strømmen) |
| 17 | FW | NOR | Daniel Braaten (released) |
| 21 | MF | NOR | Alexander Mathisen (released) |
| 28 | FW | NOR | Riki Alba (on loan to (Sweden) Varbergs BoIS, previously on loan at (Norway) Bærum) |
| 30 | GK | AUT | Michael Langer (released) |
| 37 | DF | NOR | Ivan Näsberg (on loan to (Sweden) Varbergs BoIS) |
| 38 | GK | GER | Sascha Burchert (loan return to (Germany) Hertha Berlin) |

=== Aalesund ===
In: Note: Flags indicate national team as defined under FIFA eligibility rules; some limited exceptions apply. Players may hold more than one non-FIFA nationality.

| No. | Pos. | Nation | Player |
|---|---|---|---|
| 2 | DF | DEN | Mikkel Kirkeskov (from (Denmark) OB) |
| 6 | DF | NOR | John Arne Riise (free agent) |
| 7 | FW | CIV | Franck Boli (from (China) Liaoning Whowin) |
| 14 | MF | NED | Edwin Gyasi (from (Netherlands) Roda) |
| 15 | FW | BRA | Marlinho (from (Brazil) Duque de Caxias, previously on loan) |
| 22 | DF | ISL | Adam Örn Arnarson (from (Denmark) Nordsjælland) |
| 24 | GK | NOR | Lars Cramer (from (Sweden) Kalmar) |

Out: Note: Flags indicate national team as defined under FIFA eligibility rules; some limited exceptions apply. Players may hold more than one non-FIFA nationality.

| No. | Pos. | Nation | Player |
|---|---|---|---|
| 2 | DF | NGA | Akeem Latifu (released) |
| 6 | DF | SWE | Mikael Dyrestam (to (Netherlands) NEC) |
| 9 | FW | SWE | Carl Björk (to (Sweden) Nyköpings BIS) |
| 13 | GK | NOR | Sten Grytebust (released) |
| 14 | FW | NGA | Leke James (to (China) BG) |
| 16 | MF | NOR | Magne Hoseth (to (Norway) Notodden) |
| 17 | MF | NOR | Henrik Bjørdal (to (England) Brighton & Hove Albion) |
| 22 | DF | NOR | Jo Nymo Matland (to (Belgium) Antwerp) |

== OBOS-ligaen ==
=== Bryne ===
In: Note: Flags indicate national team as defined under FIFA eligibility rules; some limited exceptions apply. Players may hold more than one non-FIFA nationality.

| No. | Pos. | Nation | Player |
|---|---|---|---|
| 7 | MF | FIN | Patrick Byskata (from (Finland) KPV Kokkola) |
| 11 | MF | NOR | Fitim Kastrati (from (Norway) Hønefoss) |
| 12 | GK | CRO | Ante Knezovic (from (Norway) Førde) |
| 15 | MF | NOR | Sander Ystanes (Promoted) |
| 17 | DF | NOR | Andreas Ueland (Promoted) |
| 23 | DF | NOR | Torstein Mjønner (from (Norway) Follo) |

Out: Note: Flags indicate national team as defined under FIFA eligibility rules; some limited exceptions apply. Players may hold more than one non-FIFA nationality.

| No. | Pos. | Nation | Player |
|---|---|---|---|
| 1 | GK | NOR | Anders Kristiansen (to (Norway) Sarpsborg) |
| 11 | MF | EGY | Sabri Khattab (to (Norway) Kvik Halden) |
| 15 | MF | NOR | Jon-Helge Tveita (to (Norway) Sarpsborg) |
| 17 | MF | NOR | Emil Dahle (loan return to (Norway) Stabæk) |
| 19 | MF | CRO | Branislav Bošnjak (released) |

=== Fredrikstad ===
In: Note: Flags indicate national team as defined under FIFA eligibility rules; some limited exceptions apply. Players may hold more than one non-FIFA nationality.

| No. | Pos. | Nation | Player |
|---|---|---|---|
| 2 | DF | NOR | Magne Simonsen (free agent) |
| 5 | DF | NOR | Torben Halvorsen (from (Norway) Junkeren) |
| 6 | MF | NOR | Patrick Karoliussen (from (Norway) Follo) |
| 7 | FW | NOR | Badr Rahhaoui (free agent) |
| 10 | FW | DEN | Sanel Kapidžić (free agent) |
| 11 | DF | NOR | Kristian Brix (free agent) |
| 17 | MF | NOR | Mats André Kaland (from (Sweden) Varbergs BoIS) |
| 21 | FW | NOR | Monir Benmoussa (from (Norway) Bærum) |
| 22 | DF | NOR | Shola Akinyemi (from (Norway) Grorud) |
| 23 | MF | NOR | Erik Tønne (free agent) |
| 26 | DF | NOR | Martin Thømt Jensen (from (Norway) Sarpsborg 08) |
| 28 | FW | SEN | Mouhamadou N'Diaye (free agent) |
| 30 | GK | NOR | Per Morten Kristiansen (free agent) |

Out: Note: Flags indicate national team as defined under FIFA eligibility rules; some limited exceptions apply. Players may hold more than one non-FIFA nationality.

| No. | Pos. | Nation | Player |
|---|---|---|---|
| 1 | GK | NOR | Alexander Vangen (to (Norway) Ull/Kisa) |
| 5 | MF | SWE | Amin Nazari (loan return to (Sweden) Malmö) |
| 6 | DF | SWE | Johan Hammar (loan return to (Sweden) Malmö) |
| 10 | FW | NOR | Dag Alexander Olsen (to (Norway) Gjøvik-Lyn) |
| 11 | MF | NGA | Julius Adaramola (released) |
| 15 | FW | NOR | Kenneth Di Vita Jensen (released) |
| 16 | MF | SWE | Sal Jaborteh (released) |
| 17 | FW | NOR | Henrik Kjelsrud Johansen (loan return to (Norway) Odd) |
| 18 | MF | NOR | Christian Berg (retired) |
| 19 | MF | NOR | Simen Standerholen (released) |
| 21 | MF | NOR | Simen Rafn (to (Sweden) Gefle) |
| 22 | MF | CIV | Hermann Pleple (released) |
| 23 | FW | NOR | Tim André Nilsen (loan return to (Norway) Mjøndalen, later sold to (Sweden) Ljungskile) |
| 27 | DF | NOR | Ola Lønn Jenssen (to (Norway) Moss) |
| 69 | DF | FRA | Loïc Abenzoar (released) |

=== Hødd ===
In: Note: Flags indicate national team as defined under FIFA eligibility rules; some limited exceptions apply. Players may hold more than one non-FIFA nationality.

| No. | Pos. | Nation | Player |
|---|---|---|---|
| 7 | FW | NOR | Didrik Sereba (from (Norway) Follo) |
| 16 | DF | NOR | Hugues Wembangomo (from (Norway) Bærum) |
| 17 | MF | NOR | Fredrik Sjølstad (from (Norway) HamKam) |
| 18 | MF | NOR | Bendik Rise (Promoted) |
| 21 | FW | NOR | Øystein Vestvatn (from (Norway) Follo) |
| 22 | DF | NOR | Martin Mork Breivik (Promoted) |
| 24 | DF | NOR | Eirik Bergum Skaasheim (on loan from (Norway) Sogndal) |

Out: Note: Flags indicate national team as defined under FIFA eligibility rules; some limited exceptions apply. Players may hold more than one non-FIFA nationality.

| No. | Pos. | Nation | Player |
|---|---|---|---|
| 1 | GK | NOR | Aslak Falch (released) |
| 5 | DF | FRA | Darnel Situ (to (Slovenia) Koper) |
| 7 | MF | NOR | Erik Sandal (released) |
| 8 | MF | NOR | Ole Amund Sveen (to (Norway) Sogndal) |
| 22 | MF | NOR | Fredrik Aursnes (to (Norway) Molde) |
| 29 | DF | NOR | Audun Kåre Øvrelid (to (Norway) Herd) |

=== Jerv ===
In: Note: Flags indicate national team as defined under FIFA eligibility rules; some limited exceptions apply. Players may hold more than one non-FIFA nationality.

| No. | Pos. | Nation | Player |
|---|---|---|---|
| 7 | FW | NOR | Ulrik Berglann (from (Norway) Bodø/Glimt, previously on loan at (Norway) Strømmen) |
| 12 | GK | NOR | Stian Christensen (free agent) |
| 25 | MF | NGA | Michael Ogungbaro (from (Denmark) Midtjylland) |
| 89 | MF | DEN | Tonny Brochmann (free agent) |

Out: Note: Flags indicate national team as defined under FIFA eligibility rules; some limited exceptions apply. Players may hold more than one non-FIFA nationality.

| No. | Pos. | Nation | Player |
|---|---|---|---|
| 12 | GK | NOR | Jostein Aaland (to (Norway) Arendal) |
| 14 | FW | NOR | Tobias Olsvik (to (Norway) Arendal, previously on loan) |
| 15 | DF | NOR | Henrik Robstad (to (Norway) Start) |
| 18 | MF | NOR | Steinar Berås (to (Norway) Arendal) |
| 99 | FW | NOR | Ohi Omoijuanfo (to (Norway) Stabæk) |

=== KFUM Oslo ===
In: Note: Flags indicate national team as defined under FIFA eligibility rules; some limited exceptions apply. Players may hold more than one non-FIFA nationality.

| No. | Pos. | Nation | Player |
|---|---|---|---|
| 7 | MF | NOR | Robin Rasch (from (Norway) Follo) |
| 13 | GK | CAN | Lars Hirschfeld (free agent) |
| 16 | FW | NOR | Stian Pettersen (from (Norway) Kjelsås) |
| 20 | DF | NOR | John Olav Norheim (on loan from (Norway) Start, previously on loan at (Norway) Nest-Sotra) |
| 26 | FW | NOR | Emil Ekblom (on loan from (Norway) Stabæk) |
| 33 | DF | NOR | Jørgen Hammer (from (Norway) Start) |

Out: Note: Flags indicate national team as defined under FIFA eligibility rules; some limited exceptions apply. Players may hold more than one non-FIFA nationality.

| No. | Pos. | Nation | Player |

=== Kongsvinger ===
In: Note: Flags indicate national team as defined under FIFA eligibility rules; some limited exceptions apply. Players may hold more than one non-FIFA nationality.

| No. | Pos. | Nation | Player |
|---|---|---|---|
| 14 | DF | NOR | Markus Skjellum (from (Norway) Skeid) |
| 15 | DF | RUS | Kirill Suslov (from (Russia) KAMAZ) |
| 17 | MF | NOR | Mathias Gjerstrøm (on loan from (Norway) Strømsgodset) |
| 19 | FW | GRE | Ioannis Sotiroglou (on loan from (Greece) ENTHOI Lakatamia) |
| 21 | FW | NOR | Simen Stølen (Promoted) |
| 23 | GK | ESP | Daniel Rojas (from (Norway) Nybergsund) |

Out: Note: Flags indicate national team as defined under FIFA eligibility rules; some limited exceptions apply. Players may hold more than one non-FIFA nationality.

| No. | Pos. | Nation | Player |
|---|---|---|---|
| 9 | FW | NOR | Magnus Solum (to (Sweden) Degerfors) |
| 12 | GK | NOR | Alexander Pedersen (on loan to (Norway) Hønefoss) |
| 14 | MF | NOR | Niklas Rekdal (to (Norway) Nybergsund) |
| 15 | MF | CIV | François Yabré (to (Norway) HamKam) |
| 17 | FW | NOR | Patrick Hansen (released) |

=== Kristiansund ===
In: Note: Flags indicate national team as defined under FIFA eligibility rules; some limited exceptions apply. Players may hold more than one non-FIFA nationality.

| No. | Pos. | Nation | Player |
|---|---|---|---|
| 4 | MF | SEN | Bocar Seck (on loan from (Norway) Bærum) |
| 20 | MF | SEN | Amidou Diop (on loan from (Norway) Molde) |
| 39 | FW | SEN | Jean Alassane Mendy (free agent) |
| 92 | MF | NOR | Kamer Qaka (on loan from (Norway) Sarpsborg 08) |

Out: Note: Flags indicate national team as defined under FIFA eligibility rules; some limited exceptions apply. Players may hold more than one non-FIFA nationality.

| No. | Pos. | Nation | Player |
|---|---|---|---|
| 3 | MF | NOR | Stian Rode Gregersen (loan return to (Norway) Molde) |
| 4 | DF | NOR | Patrik Hjelmseth (to (Norway) Herd) |
| 18 | MF | NOR | Marius Hagen (to (Norway) HamKam) |

=== Levanger ===
In: Note: Flags indicate national team as defined under FIFA eligibility rules; some limited exceptions apply. Players may hold more than one non-FIFA nationality.

| No. | Pos. | Nation | Player |
|---|---|---|---|
| 8 | MF | NOR | Vegard Voll (free agent) |
| 10 | FW | NOR | Jo Sondre Aas (from (Norway) Ranheim) |
| 12 | GK | SWE | Jonathan Malmberg (on loan from (Sweden) GIF Sundsvall) |
| 15 | DF | NOR | Eirik Engen Andersen (Promoted) |
| 17 | MF | SWE | Marcus Astvald (free agent) |
| 26 | DF | SWE | Sebastian Starkenberg (free agent) |

Out: Note: Flags indicate national team as defined under FIFA eligibility rules; some limited exceptions apply. Players may hold more than one non-FIFA nationality.

| No. | Pos. | Nation | Player |
|---|---|---|---|
| 7 | FW | NOR | Georg Flatgård (to (Norway) Ranheim) |
| 8 | MF | NOR | Simen Raaen Sandmæl (to (Norway) Ranheim) |
| 13 | MF | FRO | Kaj Leo í Bartalsstovu (released) |
| 17 | FW | NOR | Ivar Sollie Rønning (to (Norway) HamKam) |
| 18 | FW | NOR | Vegard Braaten (to (Norway) Alta) |

=== Mjøndalen ===
In: Note: Flags indicate national team as defined under FIFA eligibility rules; some limited exceptions apply. Players may hold more than one non-FIFA nationality.

| No. | Pos. | Nation | Player |
|---|---|---|---|
| 4 | DF | NOR | William Sell (Promoted) |
| 6 | MF | NOR | Michael Stilson (loan return from (Norway) Ranheim) |
| 8 | FW | NGA | Kingsley Olie |
| 15 | MF | NOR | Mathias Fredriksen (from (Norway) Odd) |
| 17 | MF | NOR | Sebastian Hansen (Promoted) |
| 18 | FW | NOR | Andreas Hellum (Promoted) |
| 19 | MF | NOR | Jonathan Lindseth (free agent) |
| 23 | MF | NOR | Lars Fuhre (from (Sweden) Hammarby) |

Out: Note: Flags indicate national team as defined under FIFA eligibility rules; some limited exceptions apply. Players may hold more than one non-FIFA nationality.

| No. | Pos. | Nation | Player |
|---|---|---|---|
| 4 | DF | NOR | Martin Strange (released) |
| 6 | MF | NZL | Craig Henderson (loan return to (Norway) Stabæk) |
| 7 | FW | DEN | Sanel Kapidžić (released) |
| 8 | MF | NOR | Stian Rasch (to (Norway) Strømmen) |
| 15 | MF | NOR | Stian Aasmundsen (released) |
| 18 | DF | USA | Rhett Bernstein (to (United States) Miami) |
| 19 | FW | NOR | Tokmac Nguen (loan return to (Norway) Strømsgodset) |
| 23 | FW | USA | Erik Hurtado (loan return to (Canada) Vancouver Whitecaps) |
| 23 | FW | NOR | Tim André Nilsen (to (Sweden) Ljungskile, previously on loan at (Norway) Fredrikstad) |
| 24 | MF | NOR | Henrik Gulden (loan return to (Germany) VfL Bochum) |

=== Ranheim ===
In: Note: Flags indicate national team as defined under FIFA eligibility rules; some limited exceptions apply. Players may hold more than one non-FIFA nationality.

| No. | Pos. | Nation | Player |
|---|---|---|---|
| 2 | DF | NOR | Christian Eggen Rismark (loan return from (Norway) Rødde) |
| 8 | MF | NOR | Simen Raaen Sandmæl (from (Norway) Levanger) |
| 11 | FW | NOR | Georg Flatgård (from (Norway) Levanger) |
| 12 | GK | NOR | Preben Øien (Promoted) |
| 26 | GK | NOR | Daniel Hagen (from (Norway) Rosenborg B) |

Out: Note: Flags indicate national team as defined under FIFA eligibility rules; some limited exceptions apply. Players may hold more than one non-FIFA nationality.

| No. | Pos. | Nation | Player |
|---|---|---|---|
| 8 | MF | NOR | Vegard Voll (released) |
| 10 | FW | NOR | Jo Sondre Aas (to (Norway) Levanger) |
| 14 | MF | NOR | Thomas Rønning (released) |
| 21 | MF | NOR | Michael Stilson (loan return to (Norway) Mjøndalen) |
| 22 | DF | NOR | Jørgen Olsen Øveraas (to (Norway) Sandnes Ulf) |

=== Raufoss ===
In: Note: Flags indicate national team as defined under FIFA eligibility rules; some limited exceptions apply. Players may hold more than one non-FIFA nationality.

| No. | Pos. | Nation | Player |
|---|---|---|---|
| 6 | DF | NOR | Aleksander Solli (free agent) |
| 12 | GK | NOR | Christopher Lund Tronhus (from (Norway) Stjørdal-Blink) |
| 17 | MF | NOR | Håvard Nome (from (Norway) Alta) |
| 18 | FW | BIH | Almir Aganspahić (free agent) |
| 19 | FW | NOR | Simen Næss (from (Norway) Nest-Sotra) |
| 21 | MF | NOR | Nicolai Fremstad (Promoted) |
| 22 | MF | NOR | Martin Heiberg (Promoted) |
| 26 | FW | NOR | Ole Thomas Skogli (Promoted) |
| — | MF | RSA | Haashim Domingo (on loan from (Portugal) Vitória de Guimarães) |

Out: Note: Flags indicate national team as defined under FIFA eligibility rules; some limited exceptions apply. Players may hold more than one non-FIFA nationality.

| No. | Pos. | Nation | Player |
|---|---|---|---|
| 6 | DF | NOR | Thomas Andersen (to (Norway) Redalen) |

=== Sandefjord ===
In: Note: Flags indicate national team as defined under FIFA eligibility rules; some limited exceptions apply. Players may hold more than one non-FIFA nationality.

| No. | Pos. | Nation | Player |
|---|---|---|---|
| 1 | GK | ISL | Ingvar Jónsson (from (Norway) Start, previously on loan at (Norway) Sandnes Ulf) |
| 3 | DF | SEN | Abdoulaye Seck (from (Norway) Hønefoss) |
| 9 | MF | NOR | Håvard Storbæk (from (Norway) Odd) |
| 10 | FW | HUN | Péter Kovács (from (Norway) Sarpaborg 08) |
| 12 | GK | NOR | Anders Gundersen (on loan from (Norway) Strømsgodset) |
| 15 | MF | ESP | Enric Vallès (from (United States) Harrisburg City Islanders) |
| 22 | MF | NOR | André Sødlund (loan return from (Norway) Nest-Sotra) |
| 30 | DF | NOR | Varg Støvland (Promoted) |

Out: Note: Flags indicate national team as defined under FIFA eligibility rules; some limited exceptions apply. Players may hold more than one non-FIFA nationality.

| No. | Pos. | Nation | Player |
|---|---|---|---|
| 1 | GK | DEN | Jakob Busk (loan return to (Denmark) København, later sold to (Germany) Union Berlin) |
| 3 | DF | NOR | Yaw Ihle Amankwah (released) |
| 9 | MF | DEN | Mads Pedersen (released) |
| 10 | FW | NOR | Eirik Lamøy (retired) |
| 15 | MF | NOR | Martin Andresen (released) |
| 17 | DF | DEN | Thomas Juel-Nielsen (to (Sweden) Falkenberg) |
| 18 | MF | SEN | Cheikhou Dieng (to (Austria) SKN St. Pölten) |
| 20 | FW | SEN | Jean Alassane Mendy (released) |
| 40 | GK | IRL | Gary Hogan (retired) |

=== Sandnes Ulf ===
In: Note: Flags indicate national team as defined under FIFA eligibility rules; some limited exceptions apply. Players may hold more than one non-FIFA nationality.

| No. | Pos. | Nation | Player |
|---|---|---|---|
| 1 | GK | FIN | Saku-Pekka Sahlgren (from (Finland) HJK Helsinki) |
| 7 | MF | NOR | Vidar Nisja (free agent) |
| 12 | GK | NOR | Egil Selvik (Promoted) |
| 16 | MF | NOR | Niklas Sandberg (loan return from (Norway) Sola) |
| 17 | MF | NOR | Eirik Schulze (from (Norway) Strømmen) |
| 19 | DF | DEN | Mads Nielsen (from (Norway) Nest-Sotra) |
| 20 | MF | NOR | Andreas Dybevik (Promoted) |
| 23 | MF | ISL | Steinþór Freyr Þorsteinsson (on loan from (Norway) Viking) |
| 29 | DF | NOR | Jørgen Olsen Øveraas (from (Norway) Ranheim) |
| 36 | MF | SRB | Bojan Zajić (free agent) |

Out: Note: Flags indicate national team as defined under FIFA eligibility rules; some limited exceptions apply. Players may hold more than one non-FIFA nationality.

| No. | Pos. | Nation | Player |
|---|---|---|---|
| 1 | GK | ISL | Ingvar Jónsson (loan return to (Norway) Start) |
| 7 | MF | USA | Paul Torres (released) |
| 10 | MF | DEN | Tonny Brochmann (released) |
| 17 | FW | NOR | Ole Kristian Langås (to (Norway) Ull/Kisa) |
| 18 | MF | NGA | Solomon Owello (released) |
| 19 | DF | NOR | Vegard Aanestad (released) |
| 22 | FW | ISL | Ólafur Karl Finsen (loan return to (Iceland) Stjarnan) |
| 28 | DF | FRA | Derek Decamps (released) |
| 29 | DF | NOR | Krister Landa (to (Norway) Ålgård) |
| 36 | FW | NOR | Sigurd Haugen (to (Norway) Odd) |
| 37 | MF | NOR | Vegard Aasen (on loan to (Norway) Vidar) |

=== Strømmen ===
In: Note: Flags indicate national team as defined under FIFA eligibility rules; some limited exceptions apply. Players may hold more than one non-FIFA nationality.

| No. | Pos. | Nation | Player |
|---|---|---|---|
| 1 | GK | NOR | Terjei Aase Omenås (from (Norway) Hønefoss) |
| 2 | DF | NOR | Markus Nakkim (on loan from (Norway) Vålerenga) |
| 7 | MF | NOR | Olav Øby (on loan from (Norway) Sarpsborg 08, previously on loan at (Norway) Follo) |
| 9 | MF | NOR | Markus Brændsrød (on loan from (Norway) Lillestrøm) |
| 11 | FW | NOR | Nasir Dernjani (from (Norway) Skeid) |
| 17 | FW | NOR | Kristian Bjørndalen (Promoted) |
| 19 | MF | SWE | Viktor Adebahr (free agent) |
| 88 | MF | NOR | Stian Rasch (from (Norway) Mjøndalen) |

Out: Note: Flags indicate national team as defined under FIFA eligibility rules; some limited exceptions apply. Players may hold more than one non-FIFA nationality.

| No. | Pos. | Nation | Player |
|---|---|---|---|
| 1 | GK | CAN | Simon Thomas (to (Norway) Bodø/Glimt) |
| 7 | MF | NOR | Eirik Schulze (to (Norway) Sandnes Ulf) |
| 9 | FW | NOR | Ulrik Berglann (loan return to (Norway) Bodø/Glimt) |
| 11 | FW | NOR | Martin Ramsland (to (Norway) Sogndal) |
| 15 | FW | NOR | Peter Sørensen Nergaard (to (Sweden) Ljungskile) |
| 17 | MF | NOR | Vetle Dragsnes (to (Norway) Ull/Kisa) |
| 19 | FW | NOR | Emil Ekblom (loan return to (Norway) Stabæk) |

=== Ull/Kisa ===
In: Note: Flags indicate national team as defined under FIFA eligibility rules; some limited exceptions apply. Players may hold more than one non-FIFA nationality.

| No. | Pos. | Nation | Player |
|---|---|---|---|
| 1 | GK | NOR | Alexander Vangen (from (Norway) Fredrikstad) |
| 4 | MF | POL | Marcin Burkhardt (from (Bulgaria) Cherno More) |
| 5 | FW | NOR | Ole Kristian Langås (from (Norway) Sandnes Ulf) |
| 11 | MF | NOR | Christian Aas (from (Norway) Hønefoss) |
| 14 | MF | NOR | Nicolay Solberg (from (Norway) Ullern) |
| 15 | DF | NOR | Thomas Braaten (from (Norway) Hønefoss) |
| 20 | MF | NOR | Vetle Dragsnes (from (Norway) Strømmen) |
| 22 | MF | POL | Michał Pawlik (on loan from (Poland) Jagiellonia Białystok) |
| 27 | MF | NOR | Fredrik Krogstad (on loan from (Norway) Lillestrøm) |

Out: Note: Flags indicate national team as defined under FIFA eligibility rules; some limited exceptions apply. Players may hold more than one non-FIFA nationality.

| No. | Pos. | Nation | Player |
|---|---|---|---|
| 5 | DF | NOR | Lars Iver Slemdal (released) |
| 12 | GK | NOR | Henrik Bakke (released) |
| 14 | FW | NOR | Shåresh Ahmadi (released) |
| 20 | DF | NOR | Simen Stensrud Blaker (released) |
| 21 | FW | NGA | Ahmed Suleiman (released) |
| 26 | MF | SWE | Viktor Adebahr (released) |
| — | GK | NOR | Christian Sukke (loan return to (Norway) Sarpsborg 08) |
| — | DF | SWE | Sebastian Starkenberg (released) |
| — | FW | NOR | Adrian Hagerup (released) |

=== Åsane ===
In: Note: Flags indicate national team as defined under FIFA eligibility rules; some limited exceptions apply. Players may hold more than one non-FIFA nationality.

| No. | Pos. | Nation | Player |
|---|---|---|---|
| 6 | MF | NOR | Peter Aase (on loan from (Norway) Sogndal) |
| 8 | DF | NOR | Fredrik Pallesen Knudsen (on loan from (Norway) Brann) |
| 11 | MF | NOR | Joachim Hammersland (from (Norway) Nest-Sotra) |
| 15 | DF | NOR | Sindre Austevoll (from (Norway) Sogndal) |
| 17 | MF | NOR | Mathias Raum (from (Norway) Brann 2) |
| 18 | DF | FIN | Roni Peiponen (on loan from (Norway) Molde) |
| 22 | DF | NOR | Mads Songve (from (Norway) Nest-Sotra) |
| 26 | MF | NOR | Simen Hatlebrekke (Promoted) |
| 88 | FW | NOR | Geir André Herrem (from (Norway) Fyllingsdalen, previously on loan) |

Out: Note: Flags indicate national team as defined under FIFA eligibility rules; some limited exceptions apply. Players may hold more than one non-FIFA nationality.

| No. | Pos. | Nation | Player |
|---|---|---|---|
| 6 | DF | NOR | Rune Gravdal (to (Norway) Follo) |
| 8 | DF | NOR | Jakob Glesnes (to (Norway) Sarpsborg 08) |
| 14 | FW | NOR | Magnus Nyborg (to (Norway) Fyllingsdalen) |
| 18 | MF | NOR | Erlend Grov (to (Norway) Fyllingsdalen, previously on loan) |
| 91 | GK | NOR | Martín Sánchez Olsen (released) |
