= Ulrik Berglann =

Norwegian football winger (born 1992)

Personal information
- Full name: Ulrik Reinaldo Berglann
- Date of birth: 31 May 1992 (age 34)
- Place of birth: Nesna Municipality, Norway
- Position: Winger

Team information
- Current team: Lyn
- Number: 7

Senior career*
Years	Team	Apps	(Gls)
2011–2015	Bodø/Glimt	66	(2)
2015	→ Strømmen (loan)	14	(0)
2016–2018	Jerv	88	(10)
2019	Arendal	15	(4)
2019–	Lyn	9	(2)
- * Club domestic league appearances and goals as of 4 September 2021

Ulrik Reinaldo Berglann (born 31 May 1992) is a Norwegian football winger who currently plays for Lyn.

== Career ==
Berglann joined the first team in 2011 after impressing at Bodø/Glimt 2.

He made his first-tier debut as a substitute against Stabæk in April 2014.

On 7 July 2015, Berglann joined Strømmen on loan until the end of the season.

== Career statistics ==
=== Club ===
As of match played 28 August 2021

Appearances and goals by club, season and competition
Club	Season	League			National Cup		Other		Total	
Club	Season	Division	Apps	Goals	Apps	Goals	Apps	Goals	Apps	Goals
Bodø/Glimt	2011	1. divisjon	2	0	0	0	—		2	0
Bodø/Glimt	2012	1. divisjon	24	1	5	2	0 (Note: Appearances in promotion play-offs.)	0	29	3
Bodø/Glimt	2013	1. divisjon	28	1	5	0	—		33	1
Bodø/Glimt	2014	Eliteserien	8	0	3	2	—		11	2
Bodø/Glimt	2015	Eliteserien	4	0	3	0	—		7	0
Bodø/Glimt	Total		66	2	16	4	0	0	82	6
Strømmen (loan)	2015	1. divisjon	14	0	0	0	—		14	0
Jerv	2016	1. divisjon	29	5	2	0	4	0	35	5
Jerv	2017	1. divisjon	30	2	3	1	—		33	3
Jerv	2018	1. divisjon	29	3	2	0	—		31	3
Jerv	Total		88	10	7	1	4	0	99	11
Arendal	2019	2. divisjon	15	4	2	1	—		17	5
Lyn	2019	3. divisjon	5	1	0	0	—		5	1
Lyn	2021	3. divisjon	4	1	1	0	—		5	1
Lyn	Total		9	2	1	0	—		10	2
Career total			192	18	26	6	4	0	222	24
