= Vegard Aanestad =

Norwegian footballer (born 1987)

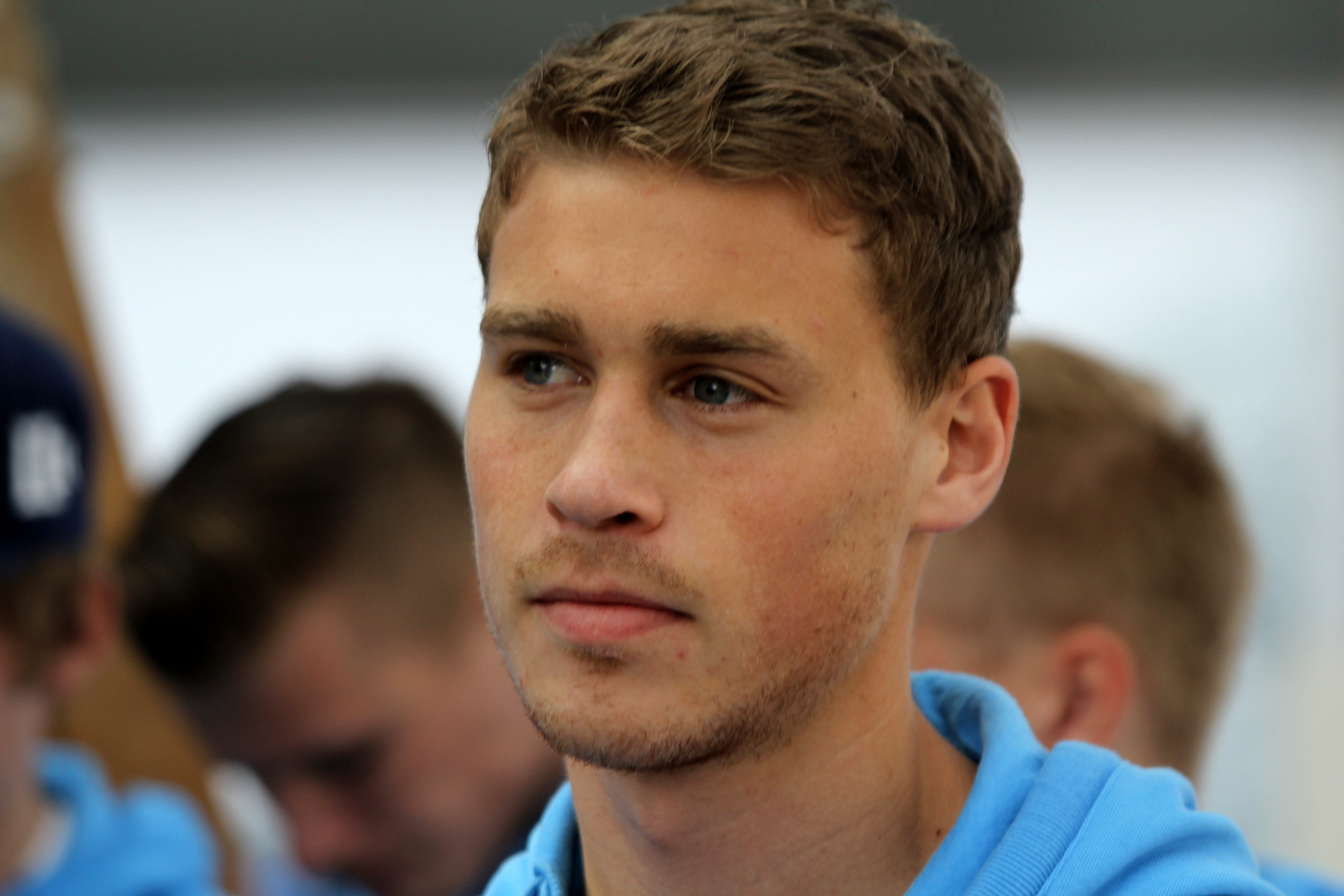
- Aanestad with Sandnes Ulf in 2014

Personal information
- Date of birth: 12 June 1987 (age 39)
- Place of birth: Stavanger, Norway
- Height: 1.85 m (6 ft 1 in)
- Position: Right-back

Team information
- Current team: Randaberg

Senior career*
Years	Team	Apps	(Gls)
–2008	Randaberg		
2009–2010	Viking	0	(0)
2010–2015	Sandnes Ulf	136	(3)
2016–2022	Randaberg	22	(11)
- * Club domestic league appearances and goals as of 11:37, 4 December 2021 (UTC)

Vegard Aanestad (born 12 June 1987) is a Norwegian former professional footballer who played as a right-back. He has played for Viking and Sandnes Ulf.

He moved to Viking in January 2009, while also Bryne and Strømsgodset were interested in signing the player. At Viking, Aanestad only featured in 2 cup matches. After moving to Sandnes Ulf in 2010, he was a regular starter in the First Division and also after the club's promotion to Eliteserien. Following his departure from Sandnes Ulf, Aanestad has played for Randaberg in the Third and Fourth Division.

== Career statistics ==
Appearances and goals by club, season and competition
Club	Season	League			Cup		Other		Total	
Club	Season	Division	Apps	Goals	Apps	Goals	Apps	Goals	Apps	Goals
Viking	2009	Eliteserien	0	0	2	0	—		2	0
Sandnes Ulf	2010	1. divisjon	26	0	2	0	—		28	0
Sandnes Ulf	2011	1. divisjon	27	0	3	0	—		30	0
Sandnes Ulf	2012	Eliteserien	26	2	1	0	2 (Note: Appearances in relegation play-offs)	0	29	2
Sandnes Ulf	2013	Eliteserien	20	1	1	0	—		21	1
Sandnes Ulf	2014	Eliteserien	22	0	1	0	—		23	0
Sandnes Ulf	2015	1. divisjon	15	0	2	0	—		17	0
Sandnes Ulf	Total		136	3	10	0	2	0	146	3
Career total			136	3	12	0	2	0	148	3
