= Kristian Brix =

Norwegian-Gambian footballer (born 1990)

Personal information
- Full name: Kristian Brix
- Date of birth: 13 June 1990 (age 36)
- Place of birth: Oslo, Norway
- Height: 1.75 m (5 ft 9 in)
- Position: Right midfielder

Youth career
- 1994–1998: Lille Tøyen
- 1998–2007: Vålerenga

Senior career*
Years	Team	Apps	(Gls)
2007–2010	Vålerenga	14	(0)
2008	→ Sogndal (loan)	3	(0)
2011–2013	Sandefjord	80	(8)
2014–2015	Bodø/Glimt	47	(0)
2016–2017	Fredrikstad	38	(2)
2017–2018	Sandnes Ulf	40	(2)
2019	KFUM	26	(3)

International career
2007	Norway U17	4	(1)
2008	Norway U18	2	(0)
2008–2009	Norway U19	6	(0)
- * Club domestic league appearances and goals as of 8 April 2019

Kristian Brix (born 13 June 1990) is a former Norwegian-born Gambian footballer.

His mother is Norwegian, and his father is Gambian.

== Career ==
Brix was the first ever player born in the 1990s to appear with Vålerenga's first team, and he has featured in both domestic and UEFA Cup competition. He scored against Lithuanian side Ekranas in August 2007. He played four games in Tippeligaen 2007. He spent the first half of the 2008 season on loan to Sogndal.

On 3 December 2010 he signed a three-year contract with Sandefjord.

On 2 January 2015 Kristian switched his allegiance to Gambia and is keen to play for the Senior Scorpions. He received his first international call in March 2017.

14 January 2019, Brix signed with KFUM. After the 2019 season Brix decide to retire from football.

== Career statistics ==
Season	Club	Division	League		Cup		Total	
Season	Club	Division	Apps	Goals	Apps	Goals	Apps	Goals
2007	Vålerenga	Tippeligaen	4	0	2	0	6	0
2008	Sogndal	Adeccoligaen	3	0	0	0	3	0
2009	Vålerenga	Tippeligaen	5	0	2	0	7	0
2010	Vålerenga	Tippeligaen	5	0	2	0	7	0
2011	Sandefjord	Adeccoligaen	28	5	3	0	31	5
2012	Sandefjord	Adeccoligaen	26	1	4	0	30	1
2013	Sandefjord	Adeccoligaen	26	2	3	0	29	2
2014	Bodø/Glimt	Tippeligaen	28	0	4	0	32	0
2015	Bodø/Glimt	Tippeligaen	19	0	2	0	21	0
2016	Fredrikstad	OBOS-ligaen	29	1	3	1	32	2
2017	Fredrikstad	OBOS-ligaen	9	1	1	0	10	1
2017	Sandnes Ulf	OBOS-ligaen	14	0	0	0	14	0
2018	Sandnes Ulf	OBOS-ligaen	25	2	2	0	27	2
2019	KFUM	OBOS-ligaen	26	3	3	0	29	3
Career Total			245	15	31	1	276	16
