= Thomas Braaten =

Norwegian footballer (born 1987)

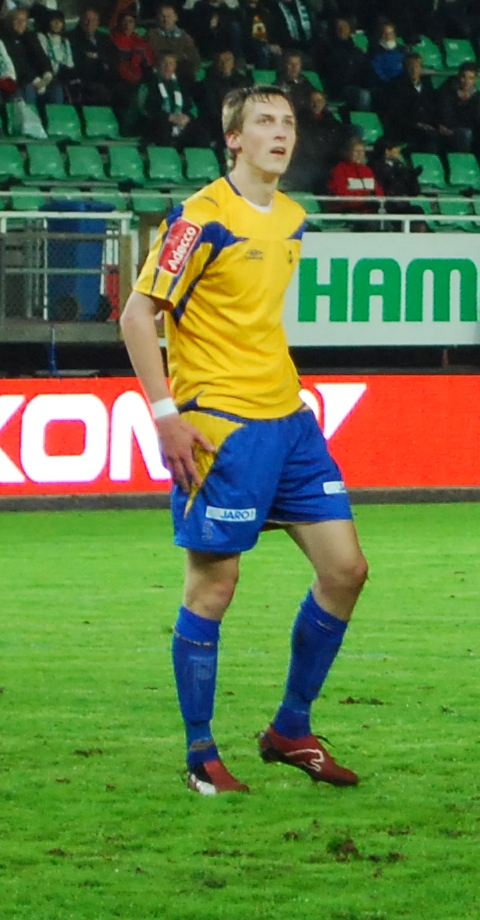

Personal information
- Full name: Thomas Båtnes Braaten
- Date of birth: 30 June 1987 (age 39)
- Place of birth: Nordreisa, Norway
- Position: Defender

Team information
- Current team: Tromsdalen
- Number: 4

Senior career*
Years	Team	Apps	(Gls)
2006–2008	Tromsø	0	(0)
2009–2011	Alta	83	(7)
2012–2014	Bodø/Glimt	72	(4)
2015	Hønefoss	30	(1)
2016	Ullensaker/Kisa	29	(1)
2017–2018	Alta	52	(1)
2019–	Tromsdalen	28	(1)
- * Club domestic league appearances and goals as of 27 October 2019

Thomas Båtnes Braaten (born 30 June 1987) is a Norwegian football defender who currently plays for Tromsdalen UIL.

== Career ==
Braaten join the first team in 2011 with here twin brother Vegard Braaten.

He made his first-tier debut as a substitute against Aalesund in March 2014.

In November 2014 he signed a three-year contract with Hønefoss.

== Career statistics ==
=== Club ===
As of match played 27 October 2019

Appearances and goals by club, season and competition
Club	Season	League			National Cup		Europe		Total	
Club	Season	Division	Apps	Goals	Apps	Goals	Apps	Goals	Apps	Goals
Tromsø	2006	Tippeligaen	0	0	1	0	-		1	0
Tromsø	2007	Tippeligaen	0	0	1	0	-		1	0
Tromsø	2008	Tippeligaen	0	0	1	0	-		1	0
Tromsø	Total		0	0	3	0	-	-	3	0
Alta	2009	Adeccoligaen	30	2	2	1	-		32	3
Alta	2010	Adeccoligaen	28	4	2	1	-		30	5
Alta	2011	Adeccoligaen	25	1	4	0	-		29	1
Alta	Total		83	7	8	2	-	-	91	9
Bodø/Glimt	2012	Adeccoligaen	28	1	5	0	-		33	1
Bodø/Glimt	2013	Adeccoligaen	24	3	5	0	-		28	3
Bodø/Glimt	2014	Tippeligaen	20	0	2	0	-		22	0
Bodø/Glimt	Total		72	4	12	0	-	-	84	4
Hønefoss	2015	OBOS-ligaen	30	1	3	0	-		33	1
Hønefoss	Total		30	1	3	0	-	-	33	1
Ullensaker/Kisa	2016	OBOS-ligaen	29	1	2	1	-		31	2
Ullensaker/Kisa	Total		29	1	2	1	-	-	31	2
Alta	2017	PostNord-ligaen	26	0	2	0	-		28	0
Alta	2018	PostNord-ligaen	26	1	3	0	-		29	1
Alta	Total		52	1	5	0	-	-	57	1
Tromsdalen	2019	OBOS-ligaen	28	1	4	0	-		32	1
Tromsdalen	Total		28	1	4	0	-	-	32	1
Career total			294	15	37	3	-	-	331	18
