= Mouhamadou N'Diaye =

Senegalese footballer (born 1994)

Personal information
- Full name: Mouhamadou Moustapha N'Diaye
- Date of birth: 24 August 1994 (age 32)
- Place of birth: Dakar, Senegal
- Height: 1.84 m (6 ft 0 in)
- Position: Forward

Senior career*
Years	Team	Apps	(Gls)
2012–2015	Slovan Liberec	12	(0)
2013	→ Bohemians 1905 (loan)	12	(0)
2014	→ Bodø/Glimt (loan)	27	(4)
2016–2017	Fredrikstad	44	(3)
2017	Elverum	12	(4)
2018–2019	Dunav Ruse	27	(2)
2021–2021	Stade de Mbour		
2021–2022	Al-Rayyan		
2023–2024	Al-Rayyan		
2024	Afif		
- * Club domestic league appearances and goals as of 17 December 2018

Mouhamadou N'Diaye (born 24 August 1994) is a Senegalese footballer who most recently played as a forward.

== Club career ==
In March 2014, N'Diaye moved on a season-long deal to Norwegian top flight team Bodø/Glimt.

In February 2016, N'Diaye moved to OBOS-ligaen team Fredrikstad.

In July 2017, N'Diaye moved to OBOS-ligaen team Elverum.

In February 2018 he joined First Professional League team Dunav Ruse on a two-and-a-half-year contract.

On 6 January 2024, N'Diaye joined Afif.

== Career statistics ==
As of 29 October 2017

Season	Club	Division	League		Cup		Total	
Season	Club	Division	Apps	Goals	Apps	Goals	Apps	Goals
2012–13	Slovan Liberec	Synot liga	8	0	0	0	8	0
2013–14	Bohemians 1905	Synot liga	12	0	0	0	12	0
2014	Bodø/Glimt	Tippeligaen	27	4	4	4	31	8
2014–15	Slovan Liberec	Synot liga	4	0	2	0	6	0
2016	Fredrikstad	OBOS-ligaen	29	2	1	0	30	2
2017	Fredrikstad	OBOS-ligaen	15	1	1	0	16	1
2017	Elverum	OBOS-ligaen	11	4	1	0	12	4
Career Total			106	11	9	4	1115	15
