= Ruben Imingen =

Norwegian footballer (born 1986)

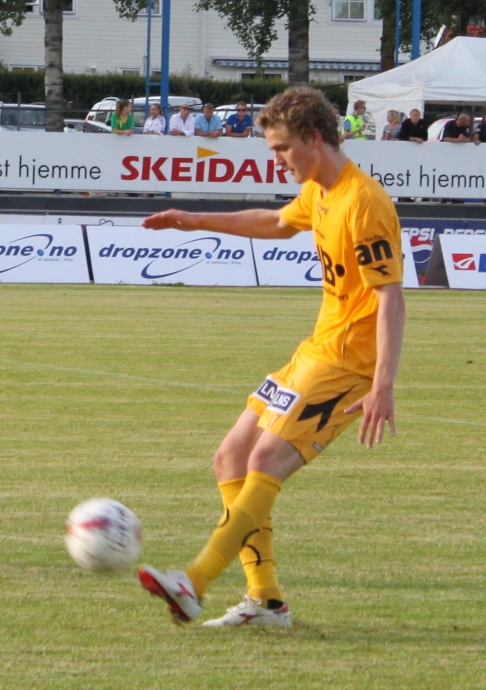

Personal information
- Full name: Ruben Notkevich Imingen
- Date of birth: December 4, 1986 (age 39)
- Place of birth: Fauske, Norway
- Height: 1.83 m (6 ft 0 in)
- Position: Defender

Senior career*
Years	Team	Apps	(Gls)
2003–2004	Fauske/Sprint		
2005–2016	Bodø/Glimt	164	(3)

International career
2006–2007	Norway U21	4	(0)
- * Club domestic league appearances and goals

Ruben Notkevich Imingen (born December 4, 1986) is a former Norwegian football defender.

Imingen started his football career in Steigen SK, and later moved to Fauske/Sprint, before settling at his current club Bodø/Glimt. He was named Player of the Season by the Bodø/Glimt supporter's club Den Gule Horde in 2006, a season which also saw his debut on the Norwegian under-21 national team. On the last home game for the season Imingen took goodbye from football, first he going to take a paternity leave.

== Career statistics ==
As of 2 November 2016

Season	Club	Division	League		Cup		Total	
Season	Club	Division	Apps	Goals	Apps	Goals	Apps	Goals
2005	Bodø/Glimt	Tippeligaen	1	0	1	0	2	0
2006	Bodø/Glimt	1. divisjon	23	0	1	0	24	0
2007	Bodø/Glimt	1. divisjon	10	0	0	0	10	0
2008	Bodø/Glimt	Tippeligaen	3	0	3	0	6	0
2009	Bodø/Glimt	Tippeligaen	14	0	2	0	16	0
2010	Bodø/Glimt	1. divisjon	19	0	3	0	22	0
2011	Bodø/Glimt	1. divisjon	14	0	0	0	14	0
2012	Bodø/Glimt	1. divisjon	29	2	5	0	34	2
2013	Bodø/Glimt	1. divisjon	30	1	4	0	34	1
2014	Bodø/Glimt	Tippeligaen	18	0	2	0	20	0
2015	Bodø/Glimt	Tippeligaen	2	0	0	0	2	0
2016	Bodø/Glimt	Tippeligaen	0	0	0	0	0	0
Career Total			163	3	21	0	184	3
