= Vieux Sané =

Senegalese footballer

Yaya Sané
Personal information
- Full name: Vieux Yaya Sané
- Date of birth: 4 August 1989 (age 37)
- Place of birth: Diourbel, Senegal
- Height: 1.91 m (6 ft 3 in)
- Position: Centre back

Youth career
- Diambars

Senior career*
| Years | Team | Apps | (Gls) |
| 2011 | Tromsø | 3 | (0) |
| 2012–2015 | Bodø/Glimt | 104 | (3) |
| 2016 | Stade Brest | 16 | (0) |
| 2016–2018 | Bursaspor | 0 | (0) |
| 2017 | → Auxerre (loan) | 9 | (1) |
| 2017–2018 | → Auxerre (loan) | 12 | (1) |
| 2019–2020 | Oostende | 5 | (0) |
| 2021 | Brann | 4 | (0) |
- * Club domestic league appearances and goals as of 31 December 2021

Vieux Yakhya Sané (born 4 August 1989) is a former Senegalese professional footballer who last played as a defender for Brann. He has previously played for Tromsø, Bodø/Glimt, Stade Brest, Bursaspor (only cup games), Auxerre and Oostende.

== Club career ==
Sané was born in Dakar, and moved to Tromsø in 2011. Before the 2012 season he signed a contract with Bodø/Glimt and made his debut in 3–3 draw against Bærum.

After four seasons with Bodø/Glimt, Sané moved to France, signing a six-month contract, with the option of an additional year, with Ligue 2 side Stade Brestois 29.

== Career statistics ==
As of match played 24 July 2021

Appearances and goals by club, season and competition
| Club | Season | League | | | Cup | | Total | |
| Club | Season | Division | Apps | Goals | Apps | Goals | Apps | Goals |
|---|---|---|---|---|---|---|---|---|
| Tromsø | 2011 | Eliteserien | 3 | 0 | 0 | 0 | 3 | 0 |
| Bodø/Glimt | 2012 | Norwegian First Division | 24 | 1 | 3 | 1 | 27 | 2 |
| Bodø/Glimt | 2013 | Norwegian First Division | 28 | 1 | 5 | 0 | 33 | 1 |
| Bodø/Glimt | 2014 | Tippeligaen | 27 | 1 | 4 | 1 | 31 | 2 |
| Bodø/Glimt | 2015 | Tippeligaen | 25 | 0 | 1 | 0 | 26 | 0 |
| Bodø/Glimt | Total | | 104 | 3 | 13 | 2 | 117 | 5 |
| Stade Brest | 2015–16 | Ligue 2 | 16 | 0 | 0 | 0 | 16 | 0 |
| Bursaspor | 2016–17 | Süper Lig | 0 | 0 | 3 | 1 | 3 | 1 |
| Auxerre (loan) | 2016–17 | Ligue 2 | 9 | 1 | 1 | 0 | 10 | 1 |
| Auxerre (loan) | 2017–18 | Ligue 2 | 12 | 1 | 2 | 0 | 14 | 1 |
| Auxerre (loan) | Total | | 21 | 2 | 3 | 0 | 24 | 2 |
| Oostende | 2019–20 | Jupiler Pro League | 5 | 0 | 2 | 0 | 7 | 0 |
| Brann | 2021 | Eliteserien | 3 | 0 | 1 | 1 | 4 | 1 |
| Career total | | | 152 | 5 | 22 | 4 | 174 | 9 |
