= Ole Kristian Langås =

Norwegian footballer (born 1993)

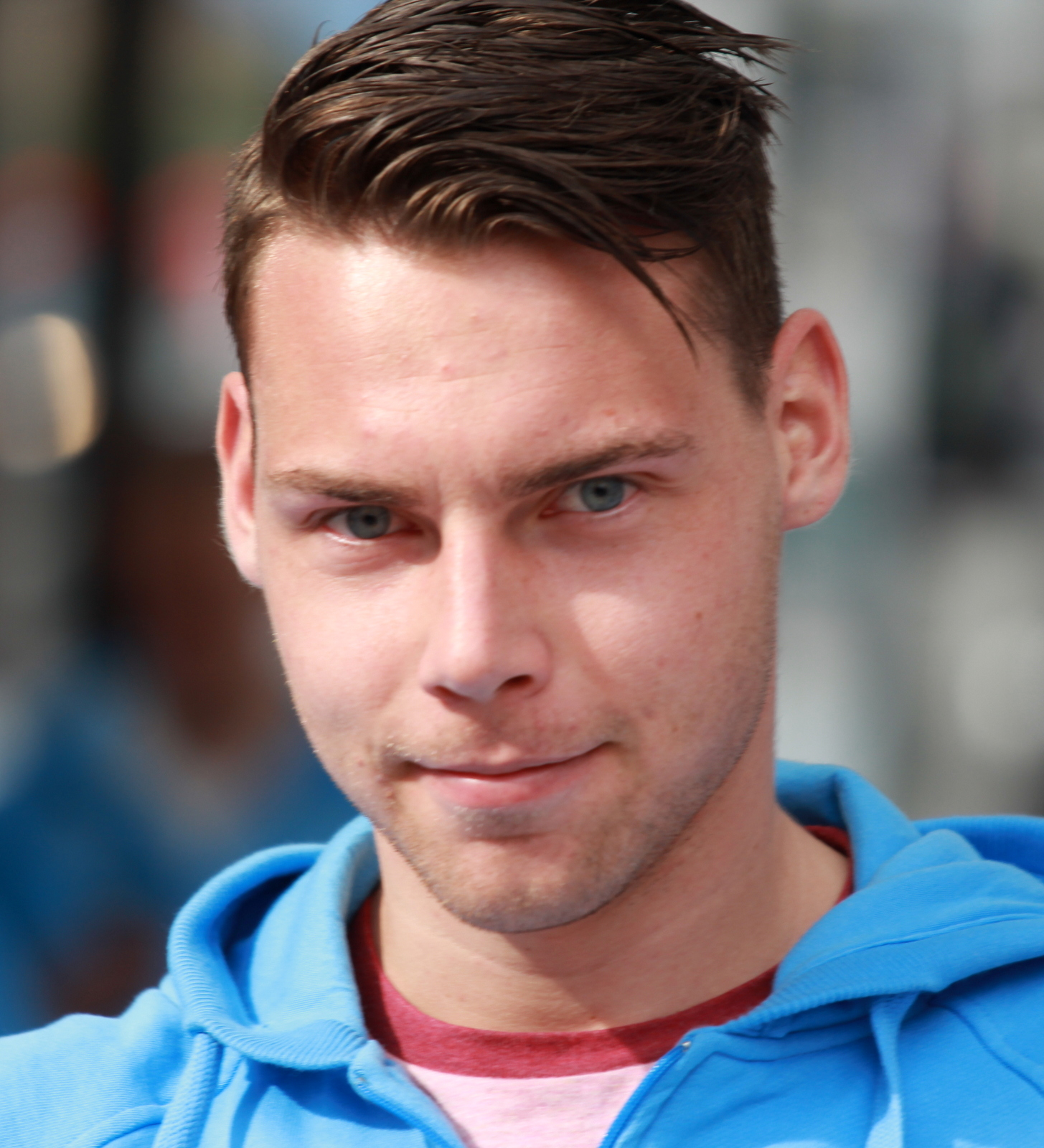

Personal information
- Date of birth: 7 May 1993 (age 33)
- Place of birth: Bærum, Norway
- Height: 1.84 m (6 ft 1/2 in)
- Position: Striker

Team information
- Current team: Eidsvold Turn

Youth career
- Hvam
- –2008: Raumnes & Årnes
- 2009–2012: Rosenborg

Senior career*
Years	Team	Apps	(Gls)
2008	Raumnes & Årnes		
2009	→ Raumnes & Årnes (loan)		
2012–2013	Ull/Kisa	41	(15)
2014–2015	Sandnes Ulf	46	(2)
2016–2022	Ull/Kisa	134	(21)
2023–	Eidsvold Turn	4	(2)

International career^{‡}
2011	Norway U18	4	(2)
- * Club domestic league appearances and goals as of 27 July 2023 ‡ National team caps and goals as of 27 July 2023

Ole Kristian Langås (born 7 May 1993) is a Norwegian footballer who plays as a striker for Eidsvold Turn.

== Club career ==
Langås was born in Bærum, but did not grow up there. He started his football career in Hvam IL, joining neighbors Raumnes & Årnes in 2008. He played briefly for their senior team on the fifth tier. Ahead of the 2009 season he signed a contract with Rosenborg BK. He would finish lower secondary school in the spring of 2009 while being loaned back to Raumnes & Årnes. He made his debut for Rosenborg's first team in a 2011 pre-season friendly. However, he never played a competitive match and was released in August 2012. He could not secure a contract with neighbours Ranheim, and trialled with Strømmen before signing for second-tier Ullensaker/Kisa.

He made his debut for Ull/Kisa in the 3–0 defeat against Start on 13 August 2012. He scored his first goal for the club in the 3–0 victory against Alta on 2 September 2012. Ahead of the 2014 season he moved up a tier, to Sandnes Ulf. He made his first-tier debut in April 2014 against Brann.

Ahead of the 2016 season he moved to his old team Ull/Kisa.

Following a lengthy stay in Ull/Kisa, he moved on to Eidsvold Turn in 2023. He was also employed by Stabæk Fotball as a physiotherapist.

== Career statistics ==
As of 15 August 2022

Season	Club	Division	League		Cup		Total	
Season	Club	Division	Apps	Goals	Apps	Goals	Apps	Goals
2012	Ull/Kisa	1. divisjon	11	1	0	0	12	1
2013	Ull/Kisa	1. divisjon	30	14	2	2	32	16
2014	Sandnes Ulf	Tippeligaen	15	1	1	0	16	1
2015	Sandnes Ulf	1. divisjon	28	1	1	0	29	1
2016	Ull/Kisa	1. divisjon	15	5	1	1	16	6
2017	Ull/Kisa	1. divisjon	17	3	2	1	19	4
2018	Ull/Kisa	1. divisjon	7	0	0	0	7	0
2019	Ull/Kisa	1. divisjon	28	4	2	1	30	5
2020	Ull/Kisa	1. divisjon	21	1	–		21	1
2021	Ull/Kisa	1. divisjon	22	0	1	0	23	0
2022	Ull/Kisa	2. divisjon	14	6	2	1	16	7
Career Total			211	36	12	6	223	42
