= Jim Johansen =

Norwegian footballer (born 1987)

Personal information
- Date of birth: 6 February 1987 (age 39)
- Place of birth: Harstad, Norway
- Height: 1.80 m (5 ft 11 in)
- Position: Winger

Senior career*
Years	Team	Apps	(Gls)
2007–2009	Harstad	57	(72)
2010	Strømsgodset	18	(2)
2011–2015	Bodø/Glimt	84	(33)
2014	→ Bryne (loan)	8	(3)
2015	→ Sogndal (loan)	11	(2)
2016–2017	Notodden	33	(16)
- * Club domestic league appearances and goals as of 28 July 2017

Jim Johansen (born 6 February 1987) is a Norwegian football winger who most recently played for Notodden.

== Career ==
=== Club career ===
==== Harstad ====
After being considered as a big talent for several seasons in Harstad, and contributing with plenty of goals, he got his big breakthrough in 2009. Even though it was in the third division in Norway, he managed to score 52 goals in one season, and some of the bigger clubs in Norway was watching him.

==== Strømsgodset ====
On 6 November 2009, Jim Johansen signed a contract with the Norwegian club Strømsgodset, after impressing the club on his try-out.

== Career statistics ==
As of 28 July 2017

Season	Club	Division	League		Cup		Total	
Season	Club	Division	Apps	Goals	Apps	Goals	Apps	Goals
2010	Strømsgodset	Tippeligaen	18	2	3	3	21	5
2011	Bodø/Glimt	Adeccoligaen	27	13	3	4	30	17
2012	Bodø/Glimt	Adeccoligaen	24	11	3	1	27	12
2013	Bodø/Glimt	Adeccoligaen	27	9	3	1	30	10
2014	Bodø/Glimt	Tippeligaen	6	0	2	0	8	0
2014	Bryne	1. divisjon	8	3	0	0	8	3
2015	Sogndal	OBOS-ligaen	11	2	1	0	12	2
2016	Notodden	PostNord-ligaen	25	16	1	1	26	17
2017	Notodden	PostNord-ligaen	8	0	1	0	9	0
Career total			154	56	17	10	171	66
