= Vebjørn Vinje =

Norwegian footballer (born 1995)

Vebjørn Walnum Vinje
Personal information
- Full name: Vebjørn Walnum Vinje
- Date of birth: 7 April 1995 (age 31)
- Place of birth: Nesna Municipality, Norway
- Height: 1.88 m (6 ft 2 in)
- Position: Defender

Team information
- Current team: Stjørdals-Blink
- Number: 4

Youth career
- –2011: Nesna
- 2011: Stabæk
- 2012: Bærum

Senior career*
Years	Team	Apps	(Gls)
–2011	Nesna		
2013–2014	Mo	28	(1)
2014–2016	Bodø/Glimt	1	(0)
2016	→ Mo (loan)	12	(3)
2017	Byåsen	1	(0)
2018–2019	Nardo	36	(5)
2019–	Stjørdals-Blink	30	(3)
- * Club domestic league appearances and goals as of 24 October 2020

Vebjørn Walnum Vinje (born 7 April 1995) is a Norwegian footballer who plays as a defender for Stjørdals-Blink.

== Club career ==
Vinje was born in Nesna Municipality. He made his senior debut for Nesna IL on the fifth tier in 2011, before moving in autumn to attend the Norwegian School of Elite Sport in Bærum Municipality. He briefly joined the youth ranks of Stabæk before fielding in the 2012 season for Bærum. Ahead of the 2013 season he quit his school, moved back to Nesna and started playing for the regional greats Mo IL. He joined Bodø/Glimt in the summer of 2014, but in the remainder of the season he only played as far as their B team.

He made his senior debut for Bodø/Glimt on 8 November 2015 against Stabæk; Bodø/Glimt won 6–1.

On 1 April, he joined Mo on loan. On 20 August 2017 he joined Byåsen after moving to Trondheim to study at the NTNU, and in 2018 he moved on to another Trondheim club Nardo.

In the summer of 2019 he went on to a third third club in the Trondheim region, Stjørdals-Blink.

== Career statistics ==
=== Club ===
As of match played 3 October 2020

Appearances and goals by club, season and competition
Club	Season	League			National Cup		Continental		Total	
Club	Season	Division	Apps	Goals	Apps	Goals	Apps	Goals	Apps	Goals
Mo	2013	Oddsen-ligaen	13	0	0	0	-		13	0
Mo	2014	Oddsen-ligaen	15	1	1	0	-		16	1
Mo	Total		28	1	1	0	-	-	29	1
Bodø/Glimt	2015	Tippeligaen	1	0	2	0	-		3	0
Bodø/Glimt	2016	Tippeligaen	0	0	1	0	-		1	0
Bodø/Glimt	Total		1	0	3	0	-	-	4	0
Mo (loan)	2016	PostNord-ligaen	12	3	2	0	-		14	3
Mo (loan)	Total		12	3	2	0	-	-	14	3
Byåsen	2017	PostNord-ligaen	1	0	0	0	-		1	0
Byåsen	Total		1	0	0	0	-	-	1	0
Nardo	2018	PostNord-ligaen	24	1	1	0	-		25	1
Nardo	2019	PostNord-ligaen	12	4	2	0	-		14	4
Nardo	Total		36	5	3	0	-	-	39	5
Stjørdals-Blink	2019	PostNord-ligaen	12	3	0	0	-		12	3
Stjørdals-Blink	2020	OBOS-ligaen	18	0	0	0	-		18	0
Stjørdals-Blink	Total		30	3	0	0	-	-	30	3
Career total			108	12	9	0	-	-	117	12
