= Vegard Braaten =

Norwegian footballer (born 1987)

Personal information
- Full name: Vegard Båtnes Braaten
- Date of birth: 30 June 1987 (age 39)
- Place of birth: Tromsø, Norway
- Height: 1.89 m (6 ft 2 in)
- Position: Striker

Team information
- Current team: Bossekop

Youth career
- 1991–2004: Nordreisa
- 2004–2007: Tromsø

Senior career*
Years	Team	Apps	(Gls)
2006–2007	Tromsø	3	(0)
2008–2009	Alta	57	(31)
2010	Tromsø	5	(0)
2010–2011	Lokeren	2	(0)
2011	→ Alta (loan)	28	(18)
2012–2014	Bodø/Glimt	48	(17)
2014	→ Alta (loan)	15	(6)
2015	Levanger	20	(3)
2016–2018	Alta	73	(41)
2019	Bossekop	1	(2)
2020	Alta	10	(4)
2021–	Bossekop	8	(11)

Managerial career
- 2019–?: Alta (assistant)
- * Club domestic league appearances and goals as of 18 April 2022

Vegard Båtnes Braaten (born 30 June 1987) is a Norwegian footballer who currently plays for Bossekop.

== Career ==
He grew up near Sørkjosen, with his twin brother and fellow footballer Thomas, and made his senior debut for Nordreisa at the age of fourteen. He joined Tippeligaen side Tromsø in 2004. He only got three league games for the club, played mainly on the reserve team, and was loaned out to Tromsdalen and Alta. In December 2008 both Thomas and Vegard Braaten were signed by Alta on a permanent basis. In June 2010 he joined Lokeren. In December 2011 he joined Bodø/Glimt from 2012, together with his twin brother Thomas Braaten.

== Coaching career ==
=== Alta IF ===
Braaten retired at the end of 2018, end then became the assistant coach of Alta, under manager Bryant Lazaro.

== Career statistics ==
As of match played 7 November 2020

Season	Club	Division	League		Cup		Total	
Season	Club	Division	Apps	Goals	Apps	Goals	Apps	Goals
2006	Tromsø	Tippeligaen	2	0	0	0	2	0
2007	Tromsø	Tippeligaen	1	0	1	0	2	0
2008	Alta	1. divisjon	27	13	1	0	28	13
2009	Alta	1. divisjon	30	18	2	1	32	19
2010	Tromsø	Tippeligaen	5	0	3	2	8	2
2010–11	Lokeren	Jupiler Pro League	2	0	0	0	2	0
2011	Alta	1. divisjon	28	18	5	1	33	19
2012	Bodø/Glimt	1. divisjon	28	10	5	2	33	12
2013	Bodø/Glimt	1. divisjon	20	7	5	2	25	9
2014	Alta	1. divisjon	15	6	2	0	17	6
2015	Levanger	1. divisjon	20	3	0	0	20	3
2016	Alta	2. divisjon	26	15	2	1	28	16
2017	Alta	2. divisjon	24	15	1	1	25	16
2018	Alta	2. divisjon	23	11	2	0	25	11
2019	Bossekop	4. divisjon	1	2	0	0	1	2
2020	Alta	2. divisjon	10	4	–		10	4
Career Total			262	122	29	10	291	132
