= 2014 Tippeligaen =

70th season of top-tier football league in Norway

Tippeligaen
- Season: 2014
- Dates: 28 March – 9 November
- Champions: Molde; 3rd title
- Relegated: Brann; Sogndal; Sandnes Ulf
- Champions League: Molde
- Europa League: Rosenborg; Odd; Strømsgodset
- Matches: 240
- Goals: 735 (3.06 per match)
- Top goalscorer: Viðar Örn Kjartansson (25 goals)
- Biggest home win: Molde 5–1 Sarpsborg 08 (21 April 2014); Lillestrøm 5–1 Stabæk (24 May 2014)
- Biggest away win: Haugesund 0–3 Sogndal (27 April 2014); Stabæk 0–3 Vålerenga (5 May 2014)
- Highest scoring: Viking 5–5 Vålerenga (2 August 2014)
- Longest winning run: 5 games Molde
- Longest unbeaten run: 9 games Molde
- Longest winless run: 7 games Start
- Longest losing run: 3 games Brann; Haugesund; Bodø/Glimt
- Highest attendance: 20,442; Rosenborg 1–3 Stabæk (16 May 2014)
- Lowest attendance: 2,511; Sogndal 1–1 Sarpsborg 08 (4 April 2014)
- Average attendance: 6,961 ▲1.9%

The 2014 Tippeligaen was the 70th completed season of top division football in Norway. The competition began on 28 March 2014, two weeks later than in the previous season. A three-week summer-break in June was scheduled due to the 2014 FIFA World Cup, and the decisive match was played on 9 November 2014. Strømsgodset were the defending champions. Bodø/Glimt and Stabæk joined as the promoted clubs from the 2013 1. divisjon. They replaced Tromsø and Hønefoss who were relegated to the 2014 1. divisjon.

Molde won their third title, with four matches to spare following a 2–1 away win against Viking on 4 October 2014. The team broke the record for most points (71) and most wins (22).

== Overview ==
=== Summary ===
On 4 October, Molde were confirmed as league champions following their 2–1 away win against Viking in the 26th round. They won their third title. On 2 November, in the penultimate round of the season, Sandnes Ulf were the first team to be relegated to the 1. divisjon when they gave away a 3–1 lead in stoppage time and drew 3–3 away to Start. On the final day, Sogndal were relegated and Brann qualified for the relegation play-offs. On 26 November, Brann were the third team to be relegated after losing the play-offs 4–1 on aggregate against Mjøndalen.

== Teams ==
The league was contested by 16 teams: the best 13 teams of the 2013 season, and the 14th-placed Sarpsborg 08 who won the relegation-playoffs against Ranheim, in addition to two promoted teams from 1. divisjon. The promoted teams were Bodø/Glimt and Stabæk, returning to the top flight after an absence of four years and one season respectively. They replaced Tromsø (after an eleven-year spell in Eliteserien) and Hønefoss (relegated after two seasons presence).

Locations of the teams in the 2014 Tippeligaen

=== Stadiums and locations ===
Note: Table lists in alphabetical order.

| Team | Ap. | Location | Arena | Turf | Capacity |
|---|---|---|---|---|---|
| Aalesund | 13 | Ålesund | Color Line Stadion | Artificial | 10,778 |
| Bodø/Glimt | 20 | Bodø | Aspmyra Stadion | Artificial | 7,354 |
| Brann | 58 | Bergen | Brann Stadion | Natural | 17,824 |
| Haugesund | 8 | Haugesund | Haugesund Stadion | Natural | 8,800 |
| Lillestrøm | 51 | Lillestrøm | Åråsen Stadion | Natural | 11,637 |
| Molde | 38 | Molde | Aker Stadion | Artificial | 11,800 |
| Odd | 33 | Skien | Skagerak Arena | Artificial | 13,500 |
| Rosenborg | 51 | Trondheim | Lerkendal Stadion | Natural | 21,850 |
| Sandnes Ulf | 5 | Sandnes | Sandnes Idrettspark | Natural | 3,850 |
| Sarpsborg 08 | 3 | Sarpsborg | Sarpsborg Stadion | Artificial | 4,700 |
| Sogndal | 16 | Sogndalsfjøra | Fosshaugane Campus | Artificial | 5,402 |
| Stabæk | 18 | Bærum | Nadderud Stadion | Natural | 7,000 |
| Start | 38 | Kristiansand | Sør Arena | Artificial | 14,300 |
| Strømsgodset | 27 | Drammen | Marienlyst Stadion | Artificial | 8,935 |
| Vålerenga | 54 | Oslo | Ullevaal Stadion | Natural | 25,572 |
| Viking | 65 | Stavanger | Viking Stadion | Natural | 16,600 |

=== Personnel and kits ===
| Team | Manager | Captain | Kit manufacturer | Shirt sponsor |
|---|---|---|---|---|
| Aalesund | (Sweden) Jan Jönsson | (Norway) Jonatan Tollås | Umbro | Sparebanken Møre |
| Bodø/Glimt | (Norway) Jan Halvor Halvorsen | (Norway) Ruben Imingen | Diadora | SpareBank 1 Nord-Norge |
| Brann | (Sweden) Rikard Norling | (Norway) Erlend Hanstveit | Hummel | Sparebanken Vest |
| Haugesund | (Norway) Jostein Grindhaug | (Norway) Per Morten Kristiansen | Umbro | Sparebanken Vest |
| Lillestrøm | (Sweden) Magnus Haglund | (Norway) Frode Kippe | Legea | #VierLSK |
| Molde | (Norway) Tor Ole Skullerud | (Norway) Daniel Berg Hestad | Nike | Sparebanken Møre |
| Odd | (Norway) Dag-Eilev Fagermo | (Norway) Steffen Hagen | Warrior | Skagerak |
| Rosenborg | (Norway) Kåre Ingebrigtsen | (Norway) Tore Reginiussen | Adidas | REMA 1000 |
| Sandnes Ulf | (Norway) Tom Nordlie | (Norway) Aksel Berget Skjølsvik | Hummel | Øster Hus |
| Sarpsborg 08 | (England) Brian Deane | (Norway) Ole Christoffer Heieren Hansen | Select | Borregaard |
| Sogndal | (Sweden) Jonas Olsson | (Norway) Rune Bolseth | Umbro | Sparebanken Vest |
| Stabæk | (United States) Bob Bradley | (Norway) Jon Inge Høiland | Adidas | SpareBank 1 |
| Start | (Norway) Mons Ivar Mjelde | (Norway) Håkon Opdal | Umbro | Sparebanken Sør |
| Strømsgodset | (Denmark) David Nielsen | (Ghana) Adam Larsen Kwarasey | Diadora | DNB |
| Vålerenga | (Norway) Kjetil Rekdal | (Norway) Christian Grindheim | Adidas | None |
| Viking | (Sweden) Kjell Jonevret | (Iceland) Indriði Sigurðsson | Diadora | Lyse |

== League table ==
| Pos | Team | Pld | W | D | L | GF | GA | GD | Pts | Qualification or relegation |
|---|---|---|---|---|---|---|---|---|---|---|
| 1 | Molde (C) | 30 | 22 | 5 | 3 | 62 | 24 | +38 | 71 | Qualification for the Champions League second qualifying round |
| 2 | Rosenborg | 30 | 18 | 6 | 6 | 64 | 43 | +21 | 60 | Qualification for the Europa League first qualifying round (Note: Since the winners of the 2014 Norwegian Cup (Molde) qualified for European competition based on their league position, the berth (Europa League first qualifying round) was passed down the league to Strømsgodset.) |
| 3 | Odd | 30 | 17 | 7 | 6 | 52 | 32 | +20 | 58 | Qualification for the Europa League first qualifying round |
| 4 | Strømsgodset | 30 | 15 | 5 | 10 | 48 | 42 | +6 | 50 | Qualification for the Europa League first qualifying round |
| 5 | Lillestrøm | 30 | 13 | 7 | 10 | 49 | 35 | +14 | 46 | |
| 6 | Vålerenga | 30 | 11 | 9 | 10 | 59 | 53 | +6 | 42 | |
| 7 | Aalesund | 30 | 11 | 8 | 11 | 40 | 39 | +1 | 41 | |
| 8 | Sarpsborg 08 | 30 | 10 | 10 | 10 | 41 | 48 | −7 | 40 | |
| 9 | Stabæk | 30 | 11 | 6 | 13 | 44 | 52 | −8 | 39 | |
| 10 | Viking | 30 | 8 | 12 | 10 | 42 | 42 | 0 | 36 | |
| 11 | Haugesund | 30 | 10 | 6 | 14 | 43 | 49 | −6 | 36 | |
| 12 | Start | 30 | 10 | 5 | 15 | 47 | 60 | −13 | 35 | |
| 13 | Bodø/Glimt | 30 | 10 | 5 | 15 | 45 | 60 | −15 | 35 | |
| 14 | Brann (R) | 30 | 8 | 5 | 17 | 41 | 54 | −13 | 29 | Qualification for the relegation play-offs |
| 15 | Sogndal (R) | 30 | 6 | 6 | 18 | 31 | 49 | −18 | 24 | Relegation to First Division |
| 16 | Sandnes Ulf (R) | 30 | 4 | 10 | 16 | 27 | 53 | −26 | 22 | Relegation to First Division |

Source: fotball.no
Rules for classification: 1) points; 2) goal difference; 3) number of goals scored.
(C) Champions; (R) Relegated

== Relegation play-offs ==
The 14th-placed team, Brann, took part in a two-legged play-off against Mjøndalen, the winners of the 2014 1. divisjon promotion play-offs, to decide who would play in the 2015 Tippeligaen.

First leg

23 November 2014
19:00 CET (UTC+1)

| Brann | 1–1 | Mjøndalen |
|---|---|---|
| Skaanes 53' | Report | Diomande 37' |

Brann Stadion, Bergen
Attendance: 14,225
Referee: Brage Sandmoen

Second leg

26 November 2014
19:00 CET (UTC+1)

| Mjøndalen | 3–0 | Brann |
|---|---|---|
| Kapidzic 27', 67'; Diomande 64' | Report |

Mjøndalen Stadion, Nedre Eiker
Attendance: 2,500
Referee: Svein Oddvar Moen

Mjøndalen won 4–1 on aggregate and gained promotion to the 2015 Tippeligaen; Brann were relegated to the 1. divisjon.

== Results ==
| Home \ Away | AAL | BOD | SKB | HAU | LSK | MFK | ODD | RBK | ULF | S08 | SIL | STB | IKS | SIF | VIF | VIK |
|---|---|---|---|---|---|---|---|---|---|---|---|---|---|---|---|---|
| Aalesund | — | 2–1 | 0–1 | 3–0 | 1–1 | 0–1 | 2–2 | 1–1 | 3–0 | 0–0 | 2–2 | 3–0 | 1–2 | 2–0 | 4–1 | 1–2 |
| Bodø/Glimt | 1–1 | — | 2–1 | 2–1 | 1–2 | 1–1 | 0–3 | 2–2 | 1–1 | 3–4 | 4–2 | 1–1 | 2–1 | 0–4 | 4–3 | 3–2 |
| Brann | 1–0 | 1–2 | — | 1–3 | 2–0 | 0–1 | 0–1 | 3–1 | 1–1 | 1–2 | 2–1 | 1–2 | 1–2 | 0–1 | 2–3 | 0–1 |
| Haugesund | 1–2 | 1–2 | 2–3 | — | 1–1 | 1–1 | 1–2 | 2–1 | 2–0 | 4–0 | 0–3 | 2–0 | 5–1 | 3–2 | 1–1 | 1–1 |
| Lillestrøm | 0–0 | 4–0 | 4–3 | 2–0 | — | 1–2 | 2–0 | 0–2 | 4–1 | 0–0 | 2–0 | 5–1 | 4–1 | 3–0 | 2–1 | 0–1 |
| Molde | 5–0 | 2–1 | 4–2 | 1–2 | 3–2 | — | 2–0 | 3–1 | 3–1 | 5–1 | 3–0 | 2–2 | 2–0 | 2–2 | 2–0 | 1–0 |
| Odd | 2–1 | 4–3 | 4–0 | 0–0 | 0–2 | 2–1 | — | 0–1 | 3–1 | 2–0 | 0–0 | 2–1 | 4–1 | 1–0 | 2–2 | 4–1 |
| Rosenborg | 3–0 | 3–1 | 5–2 | 5–3 | 3–1 | 0–2 | 2–0 | — | 3–1 | 2–0 | 1–0 | 1–3 | 3–2 | 4–1 | 3–2 | 2–2 |
| Sandnes Ulf | 1–2 | 1–0 | 1–1 | 0–0 | 0–0 | 1–3 | 1–1 | 0–2 | — | 0–2 | 1–0 | 2–1 | 1–2 | 1–3 | 2–1 | 2–2 |
| Sarpsborg 08 | 3–2 | 2–1 | 3–0 | 0–2 | 3–2 | 0–2 | 2–2 | 1–1 | 2–1 | — | 3–1 | 1–1 | 1–1 | 0–0 | 3–0 | 1–1 |
| Sogndal | 1–1 | 0–1 | 2–1 | 4–1 | 0–1 | 0–1 | 1–3 | 1–2 | 1–0 | 1–1 | — | 0–2 | 2–1 | 1–3 | 2–0 | 0–0 |
| Stabæk | 0–2 | 2–1 | 1–1 | 0–1 | 2–0 | 0–2 | 1–3 | 4–1 | 1–1 | 3–2 | 3–0 | — | 0–1 | 2–1 | 0–3 | 1–1 |
| Start | 1–2 | 2–1 | 1–1 | 3–1 | 3–1 | 1–1 | 0–1 | 2–4 | 3–3 | 3–1 | 3–2 | 2–3 | — | 2–3 | 2–2 | 0–2 |
| Strømsgodset | 2–0 | 2–0 | 1–4 | 2–1 | 2–1 | 2–0 | 2–1 | 1–1 | 1–0 | 4–1 | 1–1 | 2–3 | 4–2 | — | 0–2 | 2–1 |
| Vålerenga | 3–0 | 3–1 | 3–3 | 4–1 | 2–2 | 0–2 | 1–2 | 2–2 | 3–0 | 2–2 | 2–1 | 3–2 | 1–0 | 3–0 | — | 1–1 |
| Viking | 1–2 | 2–3 | 0–2 | 2–0 | 0–0 | 1–2 | 1–1 | 1–2 | 2–2 | 1–0 | 4–2 | 4–1 | 0–1 | 0–0 | 5–5 | — |

Source: NIFS (in Norwegian)
Legend: Blue = home team win; Yellow = draw; Red = away team win.

== Season statistics ==
=== Top scorers ===
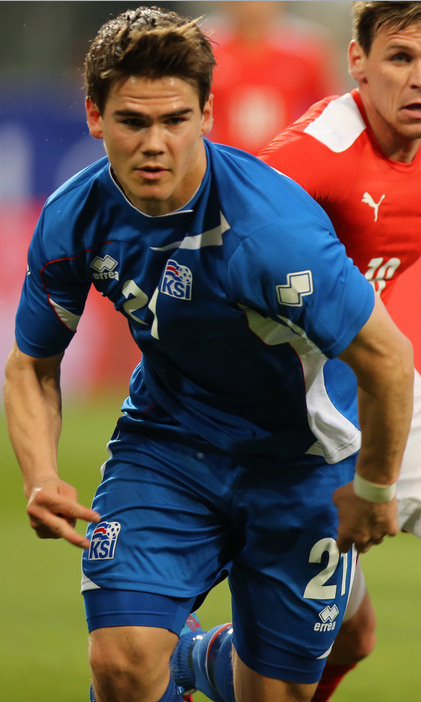
Vålerenga's Viðar Örn Kjartansson became the Tippeligaen top scorer after scoring 25 goals.

| Rank | Player | Club | Goals | Games | Average |
|---|---|---|---|---|---|
| 1 | (Iceland) Viðar Örn Kjartansson | Vålerenga | 25 | 29 | 0.86 |
| 2 | (Denmark) Christian Gytkjær | Haugesund | 15 | 26 | 0.58 |
| 3 | (Norway) Alexander Søderlund | Rosenborg | 13 | 23 | 0.57 |
| 3 | (Ivory Coast) Franck Boli | Stabæk | 13 | 28 | 0.46 |
| 3 | (Norway) Mohamed Elyounoussi | Molde | 13 | 30 | 0.43 |
| 3 | (Norway) Abdurahim Laajab | Bodø/Glimt | 13 | 30 | 0.43 |
| 7 | (Norway) Frode Johnsen | Odd | 11 | 30 | 0.37 |
| 8 | (Nigeria) Leke James | Aalesund | 10 | 23 | 0.43 |
| 8 | (Norway) Fredrik Gulbrandsen | Molde | 10 | 23 | 0.43 |
| 8 | (Hungary) Péter Kovács | Strømsgodset | 10 | 24 | 0.42 |
| 8 | (Sweden) Maic Sema | Haugesund | 10 | 26 | 0.38 |
| 8 | (Nigeria) Daniel Chima Chukwu | Molde | 10 | 27 | 0.37 |
| 8 | (Norway) Fredrik Brustad | Stabæk | 10 | 30 | 0.33 |

=== Hat-tricks ===
| Player | For | Against | Result | Date |
|---|---|---|---|---|
| (Denmark) Christian Gytkjær | Haugesund | Brann | 3–1 (A) | 30 April 2014 |
| (Norway) Mohamed Elyounoussi | Molde | Brann | 4–2 (H) | 9 June 2014 |
| (Norway) Tommy Høiland | Molde | Sandnes Ulf | 3–1 (H) | 20 July 2014 |
| (Iceland) Viðar Örn Kjartansson | Vålerenga | Viking | 5–5 (A) | 2 August 2014 |
| (Iceland) Viðar Örn Kjartansson | Vålerenga | Haugesund | 4–1 (H) | 14 September 2014 |
| (Iceland) Pálmi Rafn Pálmason | Lillestrøm | Start | 4–1 (H) | 26 October 2014 |

Notes

(H) – Home team
(A) – Away team

=== Discipline ===
==== Player ====
- Most yellow cards: 9
  - (Norway) Anders Trondsen (Stabæk)
- Most red cards: 2

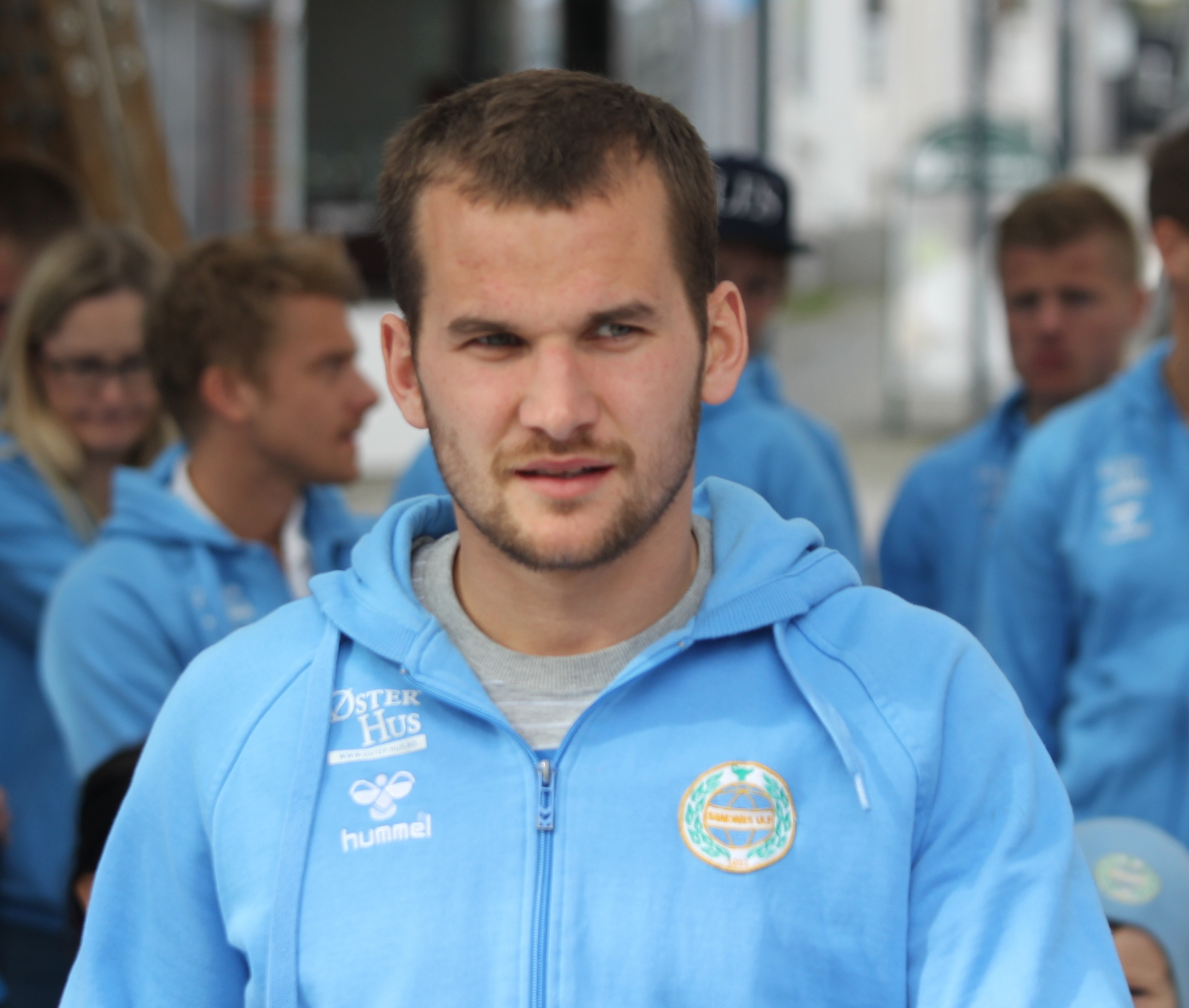
Sandnes Ulf's Aksel Berget Skjølsvik was the only player who received two red cards over the season.

  - (Norway) Aksel Berget Skjølsvik (Sandnes Ulf)

==== Club ====
- Most yellow cards: 49
  - Strømsgodset
- Most red cards: 3
  - Sandnes Ulf

=== Attendances ===
| Pos | Team | Total | High | Low | Average | Change |
|---|---|---|---|---|---|---|
| 1 | Rosenborg | 208,732 | 20,442 | 10,709 | 13,915 | −6.0% |
| 2 | Brann | 179,865 | 17,686 | 8,510 | 11,991 | +6.1% |
| 3 | Viking | 150,214 | 16,508 | 7,730 | 10,014 | −2.6% |
| 4 | Vålerenga | 146,270 | 15,437 | 7,211 | 9,751 | −1.5% |
| 5 | Molde | 138,652 | 11,424 | 8,284 | 9,243 | +4.7% |
| 6 | Aalesund | 114,024 | 9,386 | 6,580 | 7,602 | −7.2% |
| 7 | Odd | 107,363 | 11,548 | 5,556 | 7,158 | +35.1% |
| 8 | Strømsgodset | 100,623 | 7,720 | 5,861 | 6,708 | +2.8% |
| 9 | Start | 89,426 | 8,555 | 4,768 | 5,962 | −3.6% |
| 10 | Lillestrøm | 88,498 | 10,965 | 4,376 | 5,900 | +7.6% |
| 11 | Haugesund | 83,707 | 8,945 | 4,434 | 5,580 | +9.9% |
| 12 | Sarpsborg 08 | 59,194 | 4,722 | 3,509 | 3,946 | +6.9% |
| 13 | Stabæk | 57,519 | 4,609 | 3,212 | 3,835 | +65.4%^{1} |
| 14 | Bodø/Glimt | 50,730 | 5,261 | 2,533 | 3,382 | +24.4%^{1} |
| 15 | Sogndal | 50,140 | 4,517 | 2,511 | 3,343 | −1.1% |
| 16 | Sandnes Ulf | 45,577 | 4,418 | 2,350 | 3,038 | −3.2% |
| | League total | 1,670,534 | 20,442 | 2,350 | 6,961 | +1.9% |

Source: nifs.no
Notes:
1: Team played last season in 1. divisjon.

== Awards ==
=== Annual awards ===
==== Player of the Year ====
The Player of the Year awarded to (Norway) Jone Samuelsen (Odds)

==== Goalkeeper of the Year ====
The Goalkeeper of the Year awarded to (Norway) Ørjan Nyland (Molde)

==== Defender of the Year ====
The Defender of the Year awarded to (Norway) Martin Linnes (Molde)

==== Midfielder of the Year ====
The Midfielder of the Year awarded to (Norway) Jone Samuelsen (Odds)

==== Striker of the Year ====
The Striker of the Year awarded to (Iceland) Viðar Örn Kjartansson (Vålerenga)

==== Manager of the Year ====
The Manager of the Year awarded to (United States) Tor Ole Skullerud (Molde)

==== Young Player of the Year ====
The Young Player of the Year awarded to (Norway) Martin Ødegaard (Strømsgodset)
