= Norway national football team results (2000–2019) =

- Win Draw Loss

This is a list of the Norway national football team results from 2000 to 2019.

== 2000s ==
Win Draw Loss

=== 2000 ===
31 January 2000–01 Nordic Championship	Iceland	0–0	Norway	La Manga, Spain
12:30 (UTC+1); Match 629		Report		Stadium: La Manga Stadium; Attendance: 250; Referee: Nicolai Vollquartz (Denmark)

2 February 2000–01 Nordic Championship	Denmark	2–4	Norway	La Manga, Spain
15:00 (UTC+1); Match 630	Lassen 1'; Andersen 89'	Report	Berg 50', 90'; Lund 55', 90'	Stadium: La Manga Stadium; Attendance: 750; Referee: Karl-Erik Nilsson (Sweden)

4 February 2000–01 Nordic Championship	Norway	1–1	Sweden	La Manga, Spain
12:30 (UTC+1); Match 631	Carew 83'	Report	Andersson 87' (pen.)	Stadium: La Manga Stadium; Attendance: 600; Referee: Mikko Vuorela (Finland)

23 February Exhibition game	Turkey	0–2	Norway	Istanbul, Turkey
20:30 (UTC+2); Match 632		Report	Riise 38'; Strand 73'	Stadium: Ali Sami Yen Stadium; Attendance: 7,000; Referee: Giorgos Kasnaferis (Greece)

29 March Exhibition game	Switzerland	2–2	Norway	Lugano, Switzerland
20:15 (UTC+2); Match 633	Chapuisat 56'; Cantaluppi 74'	Report	Solbakken 32'; Skammelsrud 73' (pen.)	Stadium: Cornaredo Stadium; Attendance: 5,800; Referee: Pasquale Rodomonti (Italy)

26 April Exhibition game	Norway	0–2	Belgium	Oslo, Norway
19:45 (UTC+2); Match 634		Report	Verheyen 55', 90'	Stadium: Ullevaal Stadion; Attendance: 11,927; Referee: Mike McCurry (Scotland)

27 May Exhibition game	Norway	2–0	Slovakia	Oslo, Norway
19:00 (UTC+2); Match 635	Solskjær 21' (pen.); Iversen 85'	Report		Stadium: Ullevaal Stadion; Attendance: 16,350; Referee: Sten Johansson (Sweden)

3 June Exhibition game	Norway	1–0	Italy	Oslo, Norway
16:00 (UTC+2); Match 636	Carew 52'	Report		Stadium: Ullevaal Stadion; Attendance: 25,248; Referee: Graham Barber (England)

13 June UEFA Euro 2000 Group C	Spain	0–1	Norway	Rotterdam, Netherlands
18:00 (UTC+2); Match 637		Report	Iversen 65'	Stadium: Feijenoord Stadion; Attendance: 41,000; Referee: Gamal Al-Ghandour (Egypt)

18 June UEFA Euro 2000 Group C	Norway	0–1	Yugoslavia	Liège, Belgium
20:45 (UTC+2); Match 638		Report	Milošević 8'	Stadium: Stade Maurice Dufrasne; Attendance: 28,750; Referee: Hugh Dallas (Scotland)

21 June UEFA Euro 2000 Group C	Slovenia	0–0	Norway	Arnhem, Netherlands
18:00 (UTC+2); Match 639		Report		Stadium: GelreDome; Attendance: 21,000; Referee: Graham Poll (England)

16 August 2000–01 Nordic Championship	Finland	3–1	Norway	Helsinki, Finland
20:00 (UTC+3); Match 640	Litmanen 24', 61'; Kuqi 90'	Report	Helstad 54'	Stadium: Finnair Stadium; Attendance: 10,748; Referee: Mario van der Ende (Netherlands)

2 September 2002 FIFA World Cup qualification	Norway	0–0	Armenia	Oslo, Norway
16:00 (UTC+2); Match 641		Report		Stadium: Ullevaal Stadion; Attendance: 19,201; Referee: William Young (Scotland)

7 October 2002 FIFA World Cup qualification	Wales	1–1	Norway	Cardiff, Wales
15:00 (UTC+1); Match 642	Blake 60'	Report	Helstad 80'	Stadium: Millennium Stadium; Attendance: 51,100; Referee: Hartmut Strampe (Germany)

11 October 2002 FIFA World Cup qualification	Norway	0–1	Ukraine	Oslo, Norway
19:00 (UTC+2); Match 643		Report	Shevchenko 51'	Stadium: Ullevaal Stadion; Attendance: 23,612; Referee: Urs Meier (Switzerland)

=== 2001 ===
24 January 2001 Lunar New Year Cup	Norway	3–2	South Korea	So Kon Po, Hong Kong
15:15 (UTC+8); Match 644	Johnsen 36', 69'; Helstad 42'	Report	Ko Jong-soo 24' (pen.); Kim Do-hoon 68'	Stadium: Hong Kong Stadium; Attendance: 22,936; Referee: Anders Frisk (Sweden)

28 February Exhibition game	Northern Ireland	0–4	Norway	Belfast, Northern Ireland
20:00 (UTC+0); Match 645		Report	Helstad 20', 48'; Carew 30'; Stensaas 38'	Stadium: Windsor Park; Attendance: 7,502; Referee: Kenny Clark (Scotland)

24 March 2002 FIFA World Cup qualification	Norway	2–3	Poland	Oslo, Norway
16:00 (UTC+1); Match 646	Carew 59'; Solskjær 67'	Report	Olisadebe 23', 30'; Karwan 81'	Stadium: Ullevaal Stadion; Attendance: 15,077; Referee: Stuart Dougal (Scotland)

28 March 2002 FIFA World Cup qualification	Belarus	2–1	Norway	Minsk, Belarus
20:00 (UTC+3); Match 647	Khatskevich 19'; Vasilyuk 90+1'	Report	Solskjær 68'	Stadium: Dinamo Stadium; Attendance: 39,000; Referee: Kyros Vassaras (Greece)

25 April Exhibition game	Norway	2–1	Bulgaria	Oslo, Norway
20:05 (UTC+2); Match 648	Leonhardsen 75', 76'	Report	M. Hristov 1'	Stadium: Ullevaal Stadion; Attendance: 6,211; Referee: Jozef Kačenga (Slovakia)

2 June 2002 FIFA World Cup qualification	Ukraine	0–0	Norway	Kyiv, Ukraine
19:00 (UTC+3); Match 649		Report		Stadium: Olimpiyskyi National Sports Complex; Attendance: 42,000; Referee: Goran Maric (Croatia)

6 June 2002 FIFA World Cup qualification	Norway	1–1	Belarus	Oslo, Norway
19:00 (UTC+2); Match 650	Carew 80'	Report	Belkevich 23'	Stadium: Ullevaal Stadion; Attendance: 17,164; Referee: Miroslav Radoman (FR Yugoslavia)

15 August Exhibition game	Norway	1–1	Turkey	Oslo, Norway
19:00 (UTC+2); Match 651	Solskjær 74' (pen.)	Report	Şükür 78'	Stadium: Ullevaal Stadion; Attendance: 11,456; Referee: Mikko Vuorela (Finland)

1 September 2002 FIFA World Cup qualification	Poland	3–0	Norway	Chorzów, Poland
17:45 (UTC+2); Match 652	Kryszałowicz 45+1'; Olisadebe 77'; Marcin Żewłakow 88'	Report		Stadium: Stadion Śląski; Attendance: 40,000; Referee: Miroslav Liba (Czech Republic)

5 September 2002 FIFA World Cup qualification	Norway	3–2	Wales	Oslo, Norway
19:00 (UTC+2); Match 653	R. Johnsen 17'; Carew 68'; F. Johnsen 87'	Report	Savage 10'; Bellamy 28'	Stadium: Ullevaal Stadion; Attendance: 18,211; Referee: Fritz Stuchlik (Austria)

6 October 2002 FIFA World Cup qualification	Armenia	1–4	Norway	Yerevan, Armenia
19:00 (UTC+5); Match 654	H. Hakobyan 72'	Report	Borgersen 49', 80'; Carew 70', 89'	Stadium: Hanrapetakan Marzadasht; Attendance: 9,000; Referee: Andreas Schluchter (Switzerland)

=== 2002 ===
13 February Exhibition game	Belgium	1–0	Norway	Brussels, Belgium
20:15 (UTC+1); Match 655	Tanghe 84'	Report		Stadium: Stade Roi Baudouin; Attendance: 17,000; Referee: Paulo Paraty (Portugal)

27 March Exhibition game	Tunisia	0–0	Norway	Tunis, Tunisia
19:00 (UTC+1); Match 656		Report		Stadium: Stade Olympique El Menzah; Attendance: 10,000; Referee: Jamel N`Baya (Libya)

17 April Exhibition game	Norway	0–0	Sweden	Oslo, Norway
19:00 (UTC+1); Match 657		Report		Stadium: Ullevaal Stadion; Attendance: 20,759; Referee: Knud Erik Fisker (Denmark)

14 May Exhibition game	Norway	3–0	Japan	Oslo, Norway
17:45 (UTC+2); Match 658	Berg 67'; Rushfeldt 76'; Solskjær 84'	Report		Stadium: Ullevaal Stadion; Attendance: 8,348; Referee: Giorgos Kasnaferis (Greece)

22 May Exhibition game	Norway	1–1	Iceland	Bodø, Norway
20:00 (UTC+2); Match 659	Solskjær 60'	Report	Guðjónsson 5'	Stadium: Aspmyra Stadion; Attendance: 8,126; Referee: Ceri Richards (Wales)

21 August Exhibition game	Norway	0–1	Netherlands	Oslo, Norway
19:00 (UTC+2); Match 660		Report	Davids 71'	Stadium: Ullevaal Stadion; Attendance: 15,356; Referee: Fritz Stuchlik (Austria)

7 September UEFA Euro 2004 qualifying	Norway	2–2	Denmark	Oslo, Norway
16:00 (UTC+2); Match 661	Riise 54'; Carew 90+'	Report	Tomasson 23', 71'	Stadium: Ullevaal Stadion; Attendance: 25,114; Referee: Hugh Dallas (Scotland)

12 October UEFA Euro 2004 qualifying	Romania	0–1	Norway	Bucharest, Romania
20:00 (UTC+3); Match 662		Report	Iversen 83'	Stadium: Stadionul Steaua; Attendance: 21,000; Referee: Valentin Ivanov (Russia)

16 October UEFA Euro 2004 qualifying	Norway	2–0	Bosnia and Herzegovina	Oslo, Norway
20:00 (UTC+2); Match 663	Lundekvam 7'; Riise 27'	Report		Stadium: Ullevaal Stadion; Attendance: 24,169; Referee: Michal Beneš (Czech Republic)

20 November Exhibition game	Austria	0–1	Norway	Vienna, Austria
20:30 (UTC+1); Match 664		Report	Kah 27'	Stadium: Gerhard Hanappi Stadium; Attendance: 15,800; Referee: Ábrahám Attila (Hungary)

=== 2003 ===
26 January Exhibition game	United Arab Emirates	1–1	Norway	Sharjah, United Arab Emirates
22:00 (UTC+4); Match 665	Srour 63'	Report	Helstad 72'	Stadium: Sharjah Stadium; Attendance: 800; Referee: Mohamed Omar Ali Al Saeedi (United Arab Emirates)

28 January Exhibition game	Oman	1–2	Norway	Muscat, Oman
22:00 (UTC+4); Match 666	Shaaban 50'	Report	Karadas 63'; Rushfeldt 82'	Stadium: Royal Oman Police Stadium; Attendance: 500; Referee: Hassan Abdullah Al Ajmi (Oman)

12 February Exhibition game	Greece	1–0	Norway	Heraklion, Greece
20:00 (UTC+2); Match 667	Kyrgiakos 26'	Report		Stadium: Theodoros Vardinogiannis Stadium; Attendance: 2,500; Referee: Paulo Manuel Gomes Costa (Portugal)

2 April UEFA Euro 2004 qualifying	Luxembourg	0–2	Norway	Luxembourg City, Luxembourg
20:00 (UTC+2); Match 668		Report	Rushfeldt 58'; Solskjær 73'	Stadium: Stade Josy Barthel; Attendance: 2,899; Referee: Ivan Dobrinov (Bulgaria)

30 April Exhibition game	Republic of Ireland	1–0	Norway	Dublin, Republic of Ireland
19:30 (UTC+1); Match 669	Duff 17'	Report		Stadium: Lansdowne Road; Attendance: 32,643; Referee: Mike McCurry (Scotland)

22 May Exhibition game	Norway	2–0	Finland	Oslo, Norway
19:00 (UTC+2); Match 670	Leonhardsen 22'; T. Flo 80'	Report		Stadium: Ullevaal Stadion; Attendance: 13,436; Referee: Kenny Clark (Scotland)

7 June UEFA Euro 2004 qualifying	Denmark	1–0	Norway	Copenhagen, Denmark
19:15 (UTC+2); Match 671	Grønkjær 5'	Report		Stadium: Parken Stadium; Attendance: 41,824; Referee: Graham Poll (England)

11 June UEFA Euro 2004 qualifying	Norway	1–1	Romania	Oslo, Norway
19:45 (UTC+2); Match 672	Solskjær 78' (pen.)	Report	Ganea 64'	Stadium: Ullevaal Stadion; Attendance: 24,890; Referee: Ľuboš Micheľ (Slovakia)

20 August Exhibition game	Norway	0–0	Scotland	Oslo, Norway
20:00 (UTC+2); Match 673		Report		Stadium: Ullevaal Stadion; Attendance: 12,758; Referee: Mikko Vuorela (Finland)

6 September UEFA Euro 2004 qualifying	Bosnia and Herzegovina	1–0	Norway	Zenica, Bosnia and Herzegovina
20:15 (UTC+2); Match 674	Bajramović 86'	Report		Stadium: Bilino Polje Stadium; Attendance: 18,000; Referee: Stéphane Bré (France)

10 September Exhibition game	Norway	0–1	Portugal	Oslo, Norway
19:00 (UTC+2); Match 675		Report	Pauleta 9'	Stadium: Ullevaal Stadion; Attendance: 11,014; Referee: Steve Bennett (England)

11 October UEFA Euro 2004 qualifying	Norway	1–0	Luxembourg	Oslo, Norway
18:00 (UTC+2); Match 676	T. Flo 19'	Report		Stadium: Ullevaal Stadion; Attendance: 22,255; Referee: Szabó Zsolt (Hungary)

15 November UEFA Euro 2004 qualifying play-offs	Spain	2–1	Norway	Valencia, Spain
22:00 (UTC+1); Match 677	Raúl 21'; Berg 85' (o.g.)	Report	Iversen 14'	Stadium: Mestalla Stadium; Attendance: 53,000; Referee: Graham Poll (England)

19 November UEFA Euro 2004 qualifying play-offs	Norway	0–3 (1–5 agg.)	Spain	Oslo, Norway
19:30 (UTC+1); Match 678		Report	Raúl 34'; Rodríguez 49'; Etxeberria 57'	Stadium: Ullevaal Stadion; Attendance: 25,106; Referee: Pierluigi Collina (Italy)

=== 2004 ===
22 January 2004 Lunar New Year Cup	Norway	3–0	Sweden	So Kon Po, Hong Kong
15:00 (UTC+8); Match 679	Johnsen 44'; Flo 53', 63'	Report		Stadium: Hong Kong Stadium; Attendance: 10,000; Referee: James Fong Yau Fat (Hong Kong)

25 January 2004 Lunar New Year Cup	Honduras	1–3	Norway	So Kon Po, Hong Kong
17:15 (UTC+8); Match 680	Martínez 28'	Report	Brattbakk 27'; Johnsen 39'; Hoseth 86'	Stadium: Hong Kong Stadium; Attendance: 14,603; Referee: Chan Siu Kee (Hong Kong)

28 January Exhibition game	Singapore	2–5	Norway	Kallang, Singapore
19:30 (UTC+8); Match 681	Bennett 45'; Ishak 51'	Report	Stadheim 18'; Aas 42'; Flo 59', 70'; Brattbakk 67'	Stadium: National Stadium; Attendance: 2,000; Referee: Ahmad Khalidi Supian (Malaysia)

18 February Exhibition game	Northern Ireland	1–4	Norway	Belfast, Northern Ireland
20:00 (UTC); Match 682	Healy 57'	Report	Pedersen 17', 35'; Iversen 44'; Gillespie 58' (o.g.)	Stadium: Windsor Park; Attendance: 11,288; Referee: Craig Thomson (Scotland)

31 March Exhibition game	Serbia and Montenegro	0–1	Norway	Belgrade, Serbia and Montenegro
20:00 (UTC+2); Match 683		Report	Andresen 76' (pen.)	Stadium: Red Star Stadium; Attendance: 6,000; Referee: Novo Panić (Bosnia and Herzegovina)

28 April Exhibition game	Norway	3–2	Russia	Oslo, Norway
20:00 (UTC+2); Match 684	Andresen 25'; Rushfeldt 43'; Solli 62'	Report	Radimov 85'; Kirichenko 90'	Stadium: Ullevaal Stadion; Attendance: 11,435; Referee: Jan Wegereef (Netherlands)

27 May Exhibition game	Norway	0–0	Wales	Oslo, Norway
19:00 (UTC+2); Match 685		Report		Stadium: Ullevaal Stadion; Attendance: 14,137; Referee: Martin Hansson (Sweden)

18 August Exhibition game	Norway	2–2	Belgium	Oslo, Norway
19:00 (UTC+2); Match 686	Johnsen 32'; Riseth 59'	Report	Buffel 25', 34'	Stadium: Ullevaal Stadion; Attendance: 16,669; Referee: Krzysztof Słupik (Poland)

4 September 2006 FIFA World Cup qualification	Italy	2–1	Norway	Palermo, Italy
20:45 (UTC+2); Match 687	De Rossi 4'; Toni 80'	Report	Carew 1'	Stadium: Stadio Renzo Barbera; Attendance: 21,463; Referee: Alain Sars (France)

8 September 2006 FIFA World Cup qualification	Norway	1–1	Belarus	Oslo, Norway
20:00 (UTC+2); Match 688	Riseth 39'	Report	Kutuzaw 78'	Stadium: Ullevaal Stadion; Attendance: 25,272; Referee: António Almeida Costa (Portugal)

9 October 2006 FIFA World Cup qualification	Scotland	0–1	Norway	Glasgow, Scotland
15:00 (UTC+1); Match 689		Report	Iversen 54'	Stadium: Hampden Park; Attendance: 48,882; Referee: Paul Allaerts (Belgium)

13 October 2006 FIFA World Cup qualification	Norway	3–0	Slovenia	Oslo, Norway
19:00 (UTC+2); Match 690	Carew 7'; Pedersen 60'; Ødegaard 90'	Report		Stadium: Ullevaal Stadion; Attendance: 24,907; Referee: Valentin Ivanov (Russia)

16 November Exhibition game	Australia	2–2	Norway	London, England
??:?? (UTC+1); Match 691	Cahill 44'; Skoko 58'	Report	Iversen 40'; Pedersen 73'	Stadium: Craven Cottage; Attendance: 7,364; Referee: Rob Styles (England)

=== 2005 ===
22 January Exhibition game	Kuwait	1–1	Norway	Kaifan, Kuwait
16:30 (UTC+3); Match 692	Abdulaziz 27'	Report	Kvisvik 49'	Stadium: Al Kuwait Sports Club Stadium; Attendance: 200; Referee: Qasim Shaaban (Kuwait)

25 January Exhibition game	Bahrain	0–1	Norway	Riffa, Bahrain
18:00 (UTC+3); Match 693		Report	Kvisvik 49'	Stadium: Bahrain National Stadium; Attendance: 4,000; Referee: Abdulla Khalil Al Bannai (United Arab Emirates)

28 January Exhibition game	Jordan	0–0	Norway	Amman, Jordan
18:00 (UTC+3); Match 694		Report		Stadium: Amman International Stadium; Attendance: 8,000; Referee: Hassan Al Shoufi (Syria)

9 February Exhibition game	Malta	0–3	Norway	Ta' Qali, Malta
19:00 (UTC+1); Match 695		Report	Rushfeldt 71', 80'; Riise 82'	Stadium: National Stadium; Attendance: 1,000; Referee: David Malcolm (Northern Ireland)

30 March 2006 FIFA World Cup qualification	Moldova	0–0	Norway	Chișinău, Moldova
20:45 (UTC+3); Match 696		Report		Stadium: Stadionul Republican; Attendance: 6,000; Referee: Florian Meyer (Germany)

20 April Exhibition game	Estonia	1–2	Norway	Tallinn, Estonia
18:00 (UTC+3); Match 697	Saharov 81'	Report	F. Johnsen 24'; Braaten 54'	Stadium: A. Le Coq Arena; Attendance: 4,000; Referee: Pieter Vink (Netherlands)

24 May Exhibition game	Norway	1–0	Costa Rica	Oslo, Norway
19:35 (UTC+2); Match 698	F. Johnsen 78'	Report		Stadium: Ullevaal Stadion; Attendance: 21,251; Referee: Dick van Egmond (Netherlands)

4 June 2006 FIFA World Cup qualification	Norway	0–0	Italy	Oslo, Norway
20:30 (UTC+2); Match 699		Report		Stadium: Ullevaal Stadion; Attendance: 24,829; Referee: Manuel Mejuto González (Spain)

8 June Exhibition game	Sweden	2–3	Norway	Solna, Sweden
20:15 (UTC+2); Match 700	Källström 16'; Elmander 68'	Report	Riise 60'; Helstad 64'; Iversen 65'	Stadium: Råsunda Stadium; Attendance: 15,345; Referee: Jaroslav Jara (Czech Republic)

17 August Exhibition game	Norway	0–2	Switzerland	Oslo, Norway
19:00 (UTC+2); Match 701		Report	Frei 50'; Bergdølmo 59' (o.g.)	Stadium: Ullevaal Stadion; Attendance: 19,623; Referee: Nicolai Vollquartz (Denmark)

3 September 2006 FIFA World Cup qualification	Slovenia	2–3	Norway	Celje, Slovenia
20:45 (UTC+2); Match 702	Cimirotič 4'; Žlogar 81'	Report	Carew 3'; Lundekvam 24'; Pedersen 90'	Stadium: Arena Petrol; Attendance: 10,055; Referee: Luis Medina Cantalejo (Spain)

7 September 2006 FIFA World Cup qualification	Norway	1–2	Scotland	Oslo, Norway
19:00 (UTC+2); Match 703	Årst 89'	Report	Miller 21', 31'	Stadium: Ullevaal Stadion; Attendance: 24,904; Referee: Alain Hamer (Luxembourg)

8 October 2006 FIFA World Cup qualification	Norway	1–0	Moldova	Oslo, Norway
20:15 (UTC+2); Match 704	Rushfeldt 49'	Report		Stadium: Ullevaal Stadion; Attendance: 23,409; Referee: Stephen Bennett (England)

12 October 2006 FIFA World Cup qualification	Belarus	0–1	Norway	Minsk, Belarus
21:30 (UTC+3); Match 705		Report	Helstad 70'	Stadium: Dinamo Stadium; Attendance: 13,222; Referee: Konrad Plautz (Austria)

12 November 2006 FIFA World Cup qualification play-offs	Norway	0–1	Czech Republic	Oslo, Norway
19:30 (UTC+1); Match 706		Report	Šmicer 32'	Stadium: Ullevaal Stadion; Attendance: 24,264; Referee: Massimo Busacca (Switzerland)

16 November 2006 FIFA World Cup qualification play-offs	Czech Republic	1–0 (2–0 agg.)	Norway	Prague, Czechia
20:15 (UTC+1); Match 707	Rosický 35'	Report		Stadium: Toyota Arena; Attendance: 17,464; Referee: Graham Poll (England)

=== 2006 ===
25 January Exhibition game	Mexico	2–1	Norway	San Francisco, United States
20:00 (UTC-8); Match 708	Fonseca 36'; Pérez 87'	Report	Årst 10'	Stadium: Candlestick Park; Attendance: 44,729; Referee: Terry Vaughn (United States)

29 January Exhibition game	United States	5–0	Norway	Carson, United States
14:00 (UTC-8); Match 709	Twellman 5', 17', 76'; Pope 67'; Klein 87'	Report		Stadium: Home Depot Center; Attendance: 16,366; Referee: Óscar Ruiz (Colombia)

1 March Exhibition game	Senegal	2–1	Norway	Dakar, Senegal
18:00 (UTC); Match 710	N'Diaye 20'; Gueye 36'	Report	Hagen 41'	Stadium: Stade Léopold Sédar Senghor; Attendance: 35,000; Referee: Lassana Paré (Burkina Faso)

24 May Exhibition game	Norway	2–2	Paraguay	Oslo, Norway
19:00 (UTC+2); Match 711	Johnsen 22', 61'	Report	Gamarra 48'; Valdez 54'	Stadium: Ullevaal Stadion; Attendance: 10,227; Referee: Pavel Olšiak (Slovakia)

1 June Exhibition game	Norway	0–0	South Korea	Oslo, Norway
19:00 (UTC+2); Match 712		Report		Stadium: Ullevaal Stadion; Attendance: 15,487; Referee: Johan Verbist (Belgium)

16 August Exhibition game	Norway	1–1	Brazil	Oslo, Norway
??:?? (UTC+2); Match 713	Pedersen 51'	Report	Carvalho 62'	Stadium: Ullevaal Stadion; Attendance: 25,062; Referee: Stuart Dougal (Scotland)

2 September UEFA Euro 2008 qualifying	Hungary	1–4	Norway	Budapest, Hungary
19:00 (UTC+2); Match 714	Gera 90' (pen.)	Report	Solskjær 15', 44'; Strømstad 31'; Pedersen 41'	Stadium: Szusza Ferenc Stadium; Attendance: 10,500; Referee: Pieter Vink (Netherlands)

6 September UEFA Euro 2008 qualifying	Norway	2–0	Moldova	Oslo, Norway
19:00 (UTC+2); Match 715	Strømstad 74'; Iversen 79'	Report		Stadium: Ullevaal Stadion; Attendance: 23,848; Referee: Hristo Ristoskov (Bulgaria)

7 October UEFA Euro 2008 qualifying	Greece	1–0	Norway	Piraeus, Greece
21:30 (UTC+3); Match 716	Katsouranis 33'	Report		Stadium: Karaiskákis Stadium; Attendance: 25,000; Referee: Lubos Michel (Slovakia)

15 November Exhibition game	Serbia	1–1	Norway	Belgrade, Serbia
20:15 (UTC+1); Match 717	Vidić 6'	Report	Carew 22'	Stadium: Red Star Stadium; Attendance: 15,000; Referee: Giorgos Kasnaferis (Greece)

=== 2007 ===
7 February Exhibition game	Croatia	2–1	Norway	Rijeka, Croatia
20:15 (UTC); Match 718	Petrić 26'; Modrić 38'; Ćorluka (yellow card) 55'	Report	Johnsen (yellow card) 26'; Moen 86'	Stadium: Stadion Kantrida; Attendance: 8,000; Referee: Philippe Kalt (France)

24 March UEFA Euro 2008 qualifying	Norway	1–2	Bosnia and Herzegovina	Oslo, Norway
19:00 UTC+1 (Note: delayed by 35 minutes by match referee Mike Riley after flares were thrown from the stands, minutes after the kick-off.); Match 719	Carew 50' (pen.)	Report	Misimović 18'; Muslimović 33'	Stadium: Ullevaal Stadion; Attendance: 16,987; Referee: Mike Riley (England)

28 March UEFA Euro 2008 qualifying	Turkey	2–2	Norway	Frankfurt, Germany
20:00 UTC+2; Match 720	Hamit Altıntop 72', 90'	Report	Brenne 31'; Andresen 40'	Stadium: Commerzbank-Arena (Note: Turkey were ordered to play their first three home matches at a neutral ground and behind closed doors after violence in their World Cup Qualifying playoff with Switzerland on 16 November 2005.); Attendance: 0 Referee: Stefano Farina (Italy)

2 June UEFA Euro 2008 qualifying	Norway	4–0	Malta	Oslo, Norway
20:05 UTC+2; Match 721	Hæstad 31'; Helstad 73'; Iversen 79'; Riise 90+1'	Report		Stadium: Ullevaal Stadion; Attendance: 16,364; Referee: Jacek Granat (Poland)

6 June UEFA Euro 2008 qualifying	Norway	4–0	Hungary	Oslo, Norway
19:00 UTC+2; Match 722	Iversen 22'; Braaten 57'; Carew 60', 78'	Report		Stadium: Ullevaal Stadion; Attendance: 19,198; Referee: Eduardo Iturralde González (Spain)

22 August Exhibition game	Norway	2–1	Argentina	Oslo, Norway
19:00 (UTC+2); Match 723	Carew 12' (pen.), 58'	Report	Rodríguez 83'	Stadium: Ullevaal Stadion; Attendance: 23,932; Referee: Darko Čeferin (Slovenia)

8 September UEFA Euro 2008 qualifying	Moldova	0–1	Norway	Chișinău, Moldova
21:00 (UTC+3); Match 724		Report	Iversen 49'	Stadium: Zimbru Stadium; Attendance: 15,000; Referee: Robert Małek (Poland)

12 September UEFA Euro 2008 qualifying	Norway	2–2	Greece	Oslo, Norway
19:00 (UTC+2); Match 725	Carew 15'; Riise 39'	Report	Kyrgiakos 7', 30'	Stadium: Ullevaal Stadion; Attendance: 24,080; Referee: Massimo Busacca (Switzerland)

17 October UEFA Euro 2008 qualifying	Bosnia and Herzegovina	0–2	Norway	Sarajevo, Bosnia and Herzegovina
20:30 (UTC+2); Match 726		Report	Hagen 5'; B. Riise 74'	Stadium: Asim Ferhatović Hase Stadium; Attendance: 1,500; Referee: Stéphane Lannoy (France)

17 November UEFA Euro 2008 qualifying	Norway	1–2	Turkey	Oslo, Norway
19:00 (UTC+1); Match 727	Hagen 12'	Report	Belözoğlu 31'; Kahveci 59'	Stadium: Ullevaal Stadion; Attendance: 24,080; Referee: Markus Merk (Germany)

21 November UEFA Euro 2008 qualifying	Malta	1–4	Norway	Ta' Qali, Malta
20:00 (UTC+1); Match 728	M. Mifsud 53'	Report	Iversen 25', 27' (pen.), 45'; Pedersen 75'	Stadium: Ta' Qali Stadium; Attendance: 6,000; Referee: Yuri Baskakov (Russia)

=== 2008 ===
6 February Exhibition game	Wales	3–0	Norway	Wrexham, Wales
19:45 (UTC); Match 729	Fletcher 15'; Koumas 62', 89'	Report		Stadium: Racecourse Ground; Attendance: 7,553; Referee: David McKeon (Republic of Ireland)

26 March Exhibition game	Montenegro	3–1	Norway	Podgorica, Montenegro
19:30 (UTC+1); Match 730	Burzanović 8'; Bošković 37'; Đalović 60'	Report	Carew 72'	Stadium: Podgorica City Stadium; Attendance: 10,500; Referee: Aleksandar Stavrev (Macedonia)

28 May Exhibition game	Norway	2–2	Uruguay	Oslo, Norway
??:?? (UTC+1); Match 731	Elyounoussi 50'; Riise 85'	Report	Suárez 44'; Eguren 69'	Stadium: Ullevaal Stadion; Attendance: 12,246; Referee: Anthony Buttimer (Republic of Ireland)

20 August Exhibition game	Norway	1–1	Republic of Ireland	Oslo, Norway
19:00 (UTC+2); Match 732	Reginiussen 61'	Report	Keane 44'	Stadium: Ullevaal Stadion; Attendance: 16,037; Referee: Mark Whitby (Wales)

6 September 2010 FIFA World Cup qualification	Norway	2–2	Iceland	Oslo, Norway
19:00 (UTC+2); Match 733	Iversen 36' (pen.), 50'	Report	Helguson 39'; Guðjohnsen 69'	Stadium: Ullevaal Stadion; Attendance: 17,254; Referee: Alon Yefet (Israel)

11 October 2010 FIFA World Cup qualification	Scotland	0–0	Norway	Glasgow, Scotland
15:00 (UTC+1); Match 734		Report		Stadium: Hampden Park; Attendance: 50,205; Referee: Massimo Busacca (Switzerland)

15 October 2010 FIFA World Cup qualification	Norway	0–1	Netherlands	Oslo, Norway
19:00 (UTC+2); Match 735		Report	van Bommel 63'	Stadium: Ullevaal Stadion; Attendance: 23,840; Referee: Konrad Plautz (Austria)

19 November Exhibition game	Ukraine	1–0	Norway	Dnipropetrovsk, Ukraine
20:00 (UTC+2); Match 736	Seleznyov 26' (pen.)	Report		Stadium: Dnipro-Arena; Attendance: 16,500; Referee: Romāns Lajuks (Latvia)

=== 2009 ===
11 February Exhibition game	Germany	0–1	Norway	Düsseldorf, Germany
20:30 (UTC+1); Match 737		Report (NFF)	Grindheim 63'	Stadium: LTU Arena; Attendance: 45,000; Referee: Stefan Meßner (Austria)

28 March Exhibition game	South Africa	2–1	Norway	Rustenburg, South Africa
15:00 (UTC+2); Match 738	Parker 7'; Tshabalala 90+2'	Report	Pedersen 27'	Stadium: Royal Bafokeng Stadium; Attendance: 25,000; Referee: Cecil Fleischer (Ghana)

1 April Exhibition game	Norway	3–2	Finland	Oslo, Norway
19:00 (UTC+2); Match 739	J. Riise 56'; Høiland 90'; Pedersen 90+2'	Report	Johansson 39'; Eremenko 90+1'	Stadium: Ullevaal Stadion; Attendance: 16,239; Referee: Rob Styles (England)

6 June 2010 FIFA World Cup qualification	Macedonia	0–0	Norway	Skopje, Macedonia
17:45 (UTC+2); Match 740		Report		Stadium: Philip II Arena; Attendance: 7,000; Referee: Paolo Tagliavento (Italy)

10 June 2010 FIFA World Cup qualification	Netherlands	2–0	Norway	Rotterdam, Netherlands
20:45 (UTC+2); Match 741	Ooijer 32'; Robben 50'	Report		Stadium: Feijenoord Stadion; Attendance: 45,600; Referee: Yuri Baskakov (Russia)

12 August 2010 FIFA World Cup qualification	Norway	4–0	Scotland	Oslo, Norway
19:00 (UTC+2); Match 742	J. Riise 35'; Pedersen 45', 90'; Huseklepp 60'	Report		Stadium: Ullevaal Stadion; Attendance: 24,493; Referee: Alain Hamer (Luxembourg)

5 September 2010 FIFA World Cup qualification	Iceland	1–1	Norway	Reykjavík, Iceland
18:45 (UTC); Match 743	Guðjohnsen 29'	Report	J. Riise 11'	Stadium: Laugardalsvöllur; Attendance: 7,321; Referee: Alexandru Tudor (Romania)

9 September 2010 FIFA World Cup qualification	Norway	2–1	Macedonia	Oslo, Norway
20:30 (UTC+2); Match 744	Helstad 2'; J. Riise 25'	Report	Grnčarov 79'	Stadium: Ullevaal Stadion; Attendance: 14,776; Referee: Bruno Paixão (Portugal)

10 October Exhibition game	Norway	1–0	South Africa	Oslo, Norway
16:00 (UTC+2); Match 745	Wæhler 48'	Report		Stadium: Ullevaal Stadion; Attendance: 13,504; Referee: William Collum (Scotland)

14 November Exhibition game	Switzerland	0–1	Norway	Lancy, Switzerland
17:45 (UTC+2); Match 746		Report	Carew 48' (pen.)	Stadium: Stade de Genève; Attendance: 16,000; Referee: Mark Whitby (Wales)

== 2010s ==
Win Draw Loss

=== 2010 ===
3 March Exhibition game	Slovakia	0–1	Norway	Žilina, Slovakia
17:00 (UTC+1); Match 747		Report	Moldskred 67'	Stadium: Štadión pod Dubňom; Attendance: 9,756; Referee: Bas Nijhuis (Netherlands)

29 May Exhibition game	Norway	2–1	Montenegro	Oslo, Norway
16:00 (UTC+2); Match 748	Grindheim 44'; Pedersen 89'	Report	Vučinić 81'	Stadium: Ullevaal Stadion; Attendance: 13,132; Referee: Jonas Eriksson (Sweden)

2 June Exhibition game	Norway	0–1	Ukraine	Oslo, Norway
19:00 (UTC+2); Match 749		Report	Zozulya 78'	Stadium: Ullevaal Stadion; Attendance: 10,178; Referee: Kevin Blom (Netherlands)

11 August Exhibition game	Norway	2–1	France	Oslo, Norway
21:15 (UTC+2); Match 750	Huseklepp 51', 71'	Report	Ben Arfa 48'	Stadium: Ullevaal Stadion; Attendance: 15,165; Referee: Carlos Velasco Carballo (Spain)

3 September UEFA Euro 2012 qualifying	Iceland	1–2	Norway	Reykjavík, Iceland
19:00 (UTC); Match 751	Helguson 38'	Report	Hangeland 59'; Abdellaoue 75'	Stadium: Laugardalsvöllur; Attendance: 6,137; Referee: Luca Banti (Italy)

7 September UEFA Euro 2012 qualifying	Norway	1–0	Portugal	Oslo, Norway
20:30 (UTC+2); Match 752	Huseklepp 21'	Report		Stadium: Ullevaal Stadion; Attendance: 24,535; Referee: Laurent Duhamel (France)

8 October UEFA Euro 2012 qualifying	Cyprus	1–2	Norway	Larnaca, Cyprus
21:00 (UTC+3); Match 753	Okkas 58'	Report	J. Riise 2'; Carew 42'	Stadium: Antonis Papadopoulos Stadium; Attendance: 7,648; Referee: Serge Gumienny (Belgium)

12 October Exhibition game	Croatia	2–1	Norway	Zagreb, Croatia
20:15 (UTC+2); Match 754	Mandžukić 35'; Kranjčar 49'	Report	Abdellaoue 21'	Stadium: Stadion Maksimir; Attendance: 3,266; Referee: Damir Skomina (Slovenia)

17 November Exhibition game	Republic of Ireland	1–2	Norway	Dublin, Republic of Ireland
19:45 (UTC); Match 755	Long 5'	Report	Pedersen 34'; Huseklepp 86'	Stadium: Aviva Stadium; Attendance: 30,068; Referee: Kristinn Jakobsson (Iceland)

=== 2011 ===
9 February Exhibition game	Poland	1–0	Norway	Loulé, Portugal
20:30 (UTC+1); Match 756	Lewandowski 19'	Report		Stadium: Estádio Algarve; Attendance: 500; Referee: Ivo dos Anjos (Portugal)

26 March UEFA Euro 2012 qualifying	Norway	1–1	Denmark	Oslo, Norway
20:00 (UTC+1); Match 757	Huseklepp 81'	Report	Rommedahl 27'	Stadium: Ullevaal Stadion; Attendance: 24,828; Referee: Gianluca Rocchi (Italy)

4 June UEFA Euro 2012 qualifying	Portugal	1–0	Norway	Lisbon, Portugal
21:00 (UTC+1); Match 758	Postiga 53'	Report		Stadium: Estádio da Luz; Attendance: 47,829; Referee: Cüneyt Çakır (Turkey)

7 June Exhibition game	Norway	1–0	Lithuania	Oslo, Norway
19:00 (UTC+2); Match 759	Pedersen 84'	Report		Stadium: Ullevaal Stadion; Attendance: 12,945; Referee: Stuart Attwell (England)

10 August Exhibition game	Norway	3–0	Czech Republic	Oslo, Norway
20:00 (UTC+2); Match 760	Abdellaoue 23', 89' (pen.); Riise 72'	Report		Stadium: Ullevaal Stadion; Attendance: 12,734; Referee: Alan Black (Northern Ireland)

2 September UEFA Euro 2012 qualifying	Norway	1–0	Iceland	Oslo, Norway
20:00 (UTC+2); Match 761	Abdellaoue 88' (pen.)	Report		Stadium: Ullevaal Stadion; Attendance: 22,381; Referee: Ovidiu Alin Hategan (Romania)

6 September UEFA Euro 2012 qualifying	Denmark	2–0	Norway	Copenhagen, Denmark
20:15 (UTC+2); Match 762	Bendtner 24', 44'	Report		Stadium: Parken Stadium; Attendance: 37,167; Referee: Stéphane Lannoy (France)

11 October UEFA Euro 2012 qualifying	Norway	3–1	Cyprus	Oslo, Norway
20:15 (UTC+2); Match 763	Pedersen 25'; Carew 34'; Høgli 65'	Report	Okkas 42'	Stadium: Ullevaal Stadion; Attendance: 13,490; Referee: William Collum (Scotland)

12 November Exhibition game	Wales	4–1	Norway	Cardiff, Wales
16:00 (UTC); Match 764	Bale 12'; Bellamy 17'; Vokes 88', 89'	Report	Huseklepp 61'	Stadium: Cardiff City Stadium; Attendance: 12,637; Referee: Gerhard Grobelnik (Austria)

=== 2012 ===
15 January 2012 King's Cup	Denmark	1–1	Norway	Bangkok, Thailand
16:00 (UTC+7); Match 765	Makienok 70'	Report	Elyounoussi 79'	Stadium: Rajamangala Stadium; Attendance: 3,000; Referee: Mongkolchai Pechsri (Thailand)

18 January 2012 King's Cup	Thailand	0–1	Norway	Bangkok, Thailand
19:00 (UTC+7); Match 766		Report	Reginiussen 84'	Stadium: Rajamangala Stadium; Attendance: 6,000; Referee: Yudai Yamamoto (Japan)

21 January 2012 King's Cup	South Korea	3–0	Norway	Bangkok, Thailand
16:00 (UTC+7); Match 767	Kim Bo-kyung 18'; Kim Hyun-sung 21'; Seo Jung-jin 59'	Report		Stadium: Rajamangala Stadium; Attendance: 2,000; Referee: Chaiya Mahaprab (Thailand)

29 February Exhibition game	Northern Ireland	0–3	Norway	Belfast, Northern Ireland
19:45 (UTC); Match 768		Report (NFF)	Nordtveit 44'; Elyounoussi 88'; Ruud 90+2'	Stadium: Windsor Park; Attendance: 9,759; Referee: Huw Jones (Wales)

26 May Exhibition game	Norway	0–1	England	Oslo, Norway
20:45 (UTC+2); Match 769		Report	Young 9'	Stadium: Ullevaal Stadion; Attendance: 21,496; Referee: Michael Weiner (Germany)

2 June Exhibition game	Norway	1–1	Croatia	Oslo, Norway
19:00 (UTC+2); Match 770	Elyounoussi 90+2'	Report	Eduardo 79'	Stadium: Ullevaal Stadion; Attendance: 14,208; Referee: Sergey Karasyov (Russia)

15 August Exhibition game	Norway	2–3	Greece	Oslo, Norway
20:00 (UTC+2); Match 771	Hangeland 13'; Riise 75'	Report	Torosidis 7'; Papadopoulos 11'; Mitroglou 56'	Stadium: Ullevaal Stadion; Attendance: 13,680; Referee: Alan Kelly (Republic of Ireland)

7 September 2014 FIFA World Cup qualification	Iceland	2–0	Norway	Reykjavík, Iceland
18:45 (UTC); Match 772	Árnason 21'; Finnbogason 81'	Report		Stadium: Laugardalsvöllur; Attendance: 8,352; Referee: Anthony Gautier (France)

11 September 2014 FIFA World Cup qualification	Norway	2–1	Slovenia	Oslo, Norway
20:00 (UTC+2); Match 773	Henriksen 26'; Riise 90+4'	Report	Šuler 17'	Stadium: Ullevaal Stadion; Attendance: 11,168; Referee: Fırat Aydınus (Turkey)

12 October 2014 FIFA World Cup qualification	Switzerland	1–1	Norway	Bern, Switzerland
20:30 (UTC+2); Match 774	Gavranović 79'	Report	Hangeland 81'	Stadium: Stade de Suisse; Attendance: 31,516; Referee: David Fernández Borbalán (Spain)

16 October 2014 FIFA World Cup qualification	Cyprus	1–3	Norway	Larnaca, Cyprus
21:00 (UTC+3); Match 775	Aloneftis 42'	Report	Hangeland 44'; Elyounoussi 81' (pen.); King 83'	Stadium: Antonis Papadopoulos Stadium; Attendance: 2,493; Referee: Paweł Gil (Poland)

14 November Exhibition game	Hungary	0–2	Norway	Budapest, Hungary
20:30 (UTC+1); Match 776		Report	Nielsen 39'; Abdellaoue 79'	Stadium: Ferenc Puskás Stadium; Attendance: 16,000; Referee: Marijo Strahonja (Croatia)

=== 2013 ===
8 January Exhibition game	South Africa	0–1	Norway	Cape Town, South Africa
20:30 (UTC+2); Match 777		Report	Elyounoussi 41'	Stadium: Cape Town Stadium; Attendance: 32,000; Referee: Rainhold Shikongo (Namibia)

12 January Exhibition game	Zambia	0–0	Norway	Ndola, Zambia
20:30 (UTC+2); Match 778		Report		Stadium: Levy Mwanawasa Stadium; Attendance: 18,000; Referee: Victor Hlungwani (South Africa)

6 February Exhibition game	Norway	0–2	Ukraine	Seville, Spain
18:00 (UTC+2); Match 779		Report	Morozyuk 17'; Yarmolenko 42'	Stadium: Estadio de La Cartuja; Attendance: 1,500; Referee: Carlos Clos Gómez (Spain)

22 March 2014 FIFA World Cup qualification	Norway	0–1	Albania	Oslo, Norway
19:00 (UTC+1); Match 780		Report	Salihi 67'	Stadium: Ullevaal Stadion; Attendance: 11,207; Referee: Kevin Blom (Netherlands)

7 June 2014 FIFA World Cup qualification	Albania	1–1	Norway	Tirana, Albania
20:30 (UTC+2); Match 781	Rama 41'	Report	Høgli 87'	Stadium: Qemal Stafa Stadium; Attendance: 15,600; Referee: William Collum (Scotland)

11 June Exhibition game	Norway	2–0	Macedonia	Oslo, Norway
19:00 (UTC+2); Match 782	Skjelbred 9'; Braaten 79'	Report		Stadium: Ullevaal Stadion; Attendance: 8,756; Referee: Liran Liany (Israel)

14 August Exhibition game	Sweden	4–2	Norway	Solna, Sweden
20:00 (UTC+2); Match 783	Ibrahimović 2', 28', 57'; Svensson 75'	Report	Abdellaoue 38' (pen.); Johansen 43'	Stadium: Friends Arena; Attendance: 13,438; Referee: Michael Oliver (England)

6 September 2014 FIFA World Cup qualification	Norway	2–0	Cyprus	Oslo, Norway
19:00 (UTC+2); Match 784	Elyounoussi 43'; King 66'	Report		Stadium: Ullevaal Stadion; Attendance: 11,295; Referee: Kenn Hansen (Denmark)

10 September 2014 FIFA World Cup qualification	Norway	0–2	Switzerland	Oslo, Norway
19:00 (UTC+2); Match 785		Report	Schär 12', 51'	Stadium: Ullevaal Stadion; Attendance: 16,631; Referee: Howard Webb (England)

11 October 2014 FIFA World Cup qualification	Slovenia	3–0	Norway	Maribor, Slovenia
20:45 (UTC+2); Match 786	Novaković 13', 15', 49'	Report		Stadium: Stadion Ljudski vrt Attendance: 10,890; Referee: Carlos Velasco Carballo (Spain)

15 October 2014 FIFA World Cup qualification	Norway	1–1	Iceland	Oslo, Norway
20:00 (UTC+2); Match 787	Braaten 30'	Report	Sigþórsson 12'	Stadium: Ullevaal Stadion; Attendance: 6,796; Referee: Paolo Tagliavento (Italy)

15 November Exhibition game	Denmark	2–1	Norway	Herning, Denmark
19:00 (UTC+1); Match 788	Kvist 14'; Boilesen 90'	Report	Ma. Pedersen 78'	Stadium: MCH Arena; Attendance: 6,084; Referee: Robert Schörgenhofer (Austria)

19 November Exhibition game	Norway	0–1	Scotland	Molde, Norway
19:00 (UTC+1); Match 789		Report	Brown 78'	Stadium: Aker Stadion; Attendance: 9,751; Referee: Martin Strömbergsson (Sweden)

=== 2014 ===
15 January Exhibition game	Moldova	1–2	Norway	Abu Dhabi, United Arab Emirates
21:00 (UTC+4); Match 790	Posmac 30'	Report	Kamara 45+2'; de Lanlay 67'	Stadium: Zayed Sports City Stadium; Attendance: 100; Referee: Fahad Al Kassar Banihammad (United Arab Emirates)

18 January Exhibition game	Norway	0–3	Poland	Abu Dhabi, United Arab Emirates
18:00 (UTC+4); Match 791		Report	Brzyski 21'; Kucharczyk 47'; Linetty 56'	Stadium: Zayed Sports City Stadium; Attendance: 250; Referee: Rami Alkaabi (Bahrain)

5 March Exhibition game	Czech Republic	2–2	Norway	Prague, Czech Republic
18:30 (UTC+1); Match 792	Rosický 11'; Vydra 39'	Report	Elyounoussi 21'; Pedersen 88'	Stadium: Eden Aréna; Attendance: 17,039; Referee: Cüneyt Çakır (Turkey

27 May Exhibition game	France	4–0	Norway	Saint-Denis, France
21:00 (UTC+2); Match 793	Pogba 15'; Giroud 51', 69'; Rémy 67'	Report		Stadium: Stade de France; Attendance: 75,000; Referee: Pádraig Sutton (Republic of Ireland)

31 May Exhibition game	Norway	1–1	Russia	Oslo, Norway
16:00 (UTC+2); Match 794	Konradsen 77'	Report	Shatov 3'	Stadium: Ullevaal Stadion; Attendance: 11,486; Referee: Stephan Klossner (Switzerland)

27 August Exhibition game	Norway	0–0	United Arab Emirates	Stavanger, Norway
18:30 (UTC+2); Match 795		Report		Stadium: Viking Stadion; Attendance: 7,611; Referee: Mads-Kristoffer Kristoffersen (Denmark)

3 September Exhibition game	England	1–0	Norway	London, England
20:00 (UTC+1); Match 796	Rooney 68' (pen.)	Report		Stadium: Wembley Stadium; Attendance: 40,181; Referee: Jorge Sousa (Portugal)

9 September UEFA Euro 2016 qualifying	Norway	0–2	Italy	Oslo, Norway
20:45 (UTC+2); Match 797		Report	Zaza 16'; Bonucci 62'	Stadium: Ullevaal Stadion; Attendance: 26,265; Referee: Milorad Mažić (Serbia)

10 October UEFA Euro 2016 qualifying	Malta	0–3	Norway	Ta' Qali, Malta
20:45 (UTC+2); Match 798		Report	Dæhli 22'; King 26', 49'	Stadium: National Stadium; Attendance: 8,067; Referee: Antony Gautier (France)

13 October UEFA Euro 2016 qualifying	Norway	2–1	Bulgaria	Oslo, Norway
20:45 (UTC+2); Match 799	T. Elyounoussi 13'; Nielsen 72'	Report	Bodurov 43'	Stadium: Ullevaal Stadion; Attendance: 18,990; Referee: Olegário Benquerença (Portugal)

12 November Exhibition game	Norway	0–1	Estonia	Oslo, Norway
20:00 (UTC+1); Match 800		Report	Vassiljev 24'	Stadium: Ullevaal Stadion; Attendance: 9,580; Referee: Martin Hansson (Sweden)

16 November UEFA Euro 2016 qualifying	Azerbaijan	0–1	Norway	Baku, Azerbaijan
21:00 (UTC+4); Match 801		Report	Nordtveit 25'	Stadium: Bakcell Arena; Attendance: 9,200; Referee: Yevhen Aranovskiy (Ukraine)

=== 2015 ===
28 March UEFA Euro 2016 qualifying	Croatia	5–1	Norway	Zagreb, Croatia
18:00 (UTC+1); Match 802	Brozović 30'; Perišić 53'; Olić 65'; Schildenfeld 87'; Pranjić 90+4'	Report	Tettey 80'	Stadium: Stadion Maksimir; Attendance: 23,920; Referee: Carlos Velasco Carballo (Spain)

8 June Exhibition game	Norway	0–0	Sweden	Oslo, Norway
20:00 (UTC+1); Match 803		Report		Stadium: Ullevaal Stadion; Attendance: 26,659; Referee: Anthony Taylor (England)

12 June UEFA Euro 2016 qualifying	Norway	0–0	Azerbaijan	Oslo, Norway
20:45 (UTC+2); Match 804		Report		Stadium: Ullevaal Stadion; Attendance: 21,228; Referee: Paweł Gil (Poland)

3 September UEFA Euro 2016 qualifying	Bulgaria	0–1	Norway	Sofia, Bulgaria
21:45 (UTC+3); Match 805		Report	Forren 57'	Stadium: Vasil Levski National Stadium; Attendance: 12,913; Referee: Bas Nijhuis (Netherlands)

6 September UEFA Euro 2016 qualifying	Norway	2–0	Croatia	Oslo, Norway
18:00 (UTC+2); Match 806	Berget 51'; Ćorluka 69' (o.g.)	Report		Stadium: Ullevaal Stadion; Attendance: 26,751; Referee: Viktor Kassai (Hungary)

10 October UEFA Euro 2016 qualifying	Norway	2–0	Malta	Oslo, Norway
18:00 (UTC+2); Match 807	Tettey 19'; Søderlund 52'	Report		Stadium: Ullevaal Stadion; Attendance: 27,120; Referee: Arnold Hunter (Northern Ireland)

13 October UEFA Euro 2016 qualifying	Italy	2–1	Norway	Rome, Italy
20:45 (UTC+2); Match 808	Florenzi 73'; Pellè 82'	Report	Tettey 23'	Stadium: Stadio Olimpico; Attendance: 30,000; Referee: Felix Brych (Germany)

12 November UEFA Euro 2016 qualifying play-offs	Norway	0–1	Hungary	Oslo, Norway
20:45 (UTC+1); Match 809		Report	László 26'	Stadium: Ullevaal Stadion; Attendance: 27,182; Referee: Mark Clattenburg (England)

15 November UEFA Euro 2016 qualifying play-offs	Hungary	2–1 (3–1 agg.)	Norway	Budapest, Hungary
20:45 (UTC+1); Match 810	Tamás 14'; Henriksen 83' (o.g.)	Report	Henriksen 87'	Stadium: Groupama Arena; Attendance: 22,168; Referee: Carlos Velasco Carballo (Spain)

=== 2016 ===
24 March Exhibition game	Estonia	0–0	Norway	Tallinn, Estonia
19:00 (UTC+2); Match 811		Report		Stadium: A. Le Coq Arena; Attendance: 2,892; Referee: Andrew Dallas (Scotland)

29 March Exhibition game	Norway	2–0	Finland	Oslo, Norway
20:00 (UTC+2); Match 812	Berget 57'; Johansen 84'	Report (NFF)		Stadium: Ullevaal Stadion; Attendance: 4,675; Referee: Neil Doyle (Republic of Ireland)

29 May Exhibition game	Portugal	3–0	Norway	Porto, Portugal
20:45 (UTC+1); Match 813	Quaresma 13'; Guerreiro 65'; Eder 70'	Report		Stadium: Estádio do Dragão; Attendance: 34,275; Referee: Padraig Sutton (Northern Ireland)

1 June Exhibition game	Norway	3–2	Iceland	Oslo, Norway
19:45 (UTC+2); Match 814	Johansen 1'; Helland 41'; Sørloth 67'	Report (NFF)	Ingason 36'; G. Sigurðsson 81' (pen.)	Stadium: Ullevaal Stadion; Attendance: 9,568; Referee: Kevin Clancy (Scotland)

5 June Exhibition game	Belgium	3–2	Norway	Brussels, Belgium
18:00 (UTC+2); Match 815	Lukaku 3'; Hazard 70'; Ciman 74'	Report	King 21'; Berisha 48'	Stadium: King Baudouin Stadium; Attendance: 42,196; Referee: Tobias Stieler (German)

31 August Exhibition game	Norway	0–1	Belarus	Oslo, Norway
19:30 (UTC+2); Match 816		Report	Kryvets 57'	Stadium: Ullevaal Stadion; Attendance: 7,180; Referee: Jacob Bille (Denmark)

4 September 2018 FIFA World Cup qualification	Norway	0–3	Germany	Oslo, Norway
20:45 (UTC+2); Match 817		Report (FIFA); Report (UEFA)	Müller 16', 60'; Kimmich 45'	Stadium: Ullevaal Stadion; Attendance: 26,793; Referee: Willie Collum (Scotland)

8 October 2018 FIFA World Cup qualification	Azerbaijan	1–0	Norway	Baku, Azerbaijan
20:00 (UTC+4); Match 818	Medvedev 11'	Report (FIFA); Report (UEFA)		Stadium: Olympic Stadium; Attendance: 35,000; Referee: Liran Liany (Israel)

11 October 2018 FIFA World Cup qualification	Norway	4–1	San Marino	Oslo, Norway
20:45 (UTC+2); Match 819	D. Simoncini 12' (o.g.); Diomande 77'; Samuelsen 82'; King 83'	Report (FIFA); Report (UEFA)	Stefanelli 54'	Stadium: Ullevaal Stadion; Attendance: 8,214; Referee: Benoît Bastien (France)

11 November 2018 FIFA World Cup qualification	Czech Republic	2–1	Norway	Prague, Czechia
20:45 (UTC+1); Match 820	Krmenčík 11'; Zmrhal 47'	Report (FIFA); Report (UEFA)	King 87'	Stadium: Eden Arena; Attendance: 16,411; Referee: Bas Nijhuis (Netherlands)

=== 2017 ===
26 March 2018 FIFA World Cup qualification	Northern Ireland	2–0	Norway	Belfast, Northern Ireland
19:45 (UTC+1); Match 821	Ward 2'; Washington 33'	Report (FIFA); Report (UEFA)		Stadium: Windsor Park; Attendance: 18,161; Referee: Hüseyin Göçek (Turkey)

10 June 2018 FIFA World Cup qualification	Norway	1–1	Czech Republic	Oslo, Norway
20:45 (UTC+2); Match 822	Søderlund 55' (pen.)	Report (FIFA); Report (UEFA)	Gebre Selassie 36'	Stadium: Ullevaal Stadion; Attendance: 12,179; Referee: Andre Marriner (England)

13 June Exhibition game	Norway	1–1	Sweden	Oslo, Norway
19:45 (UTC+2); Match 823	M. Elyounoussi 44'	Report	Armenteros 81'	Stadium: Ullevaal Stadion; Attendance: 11,940; Referee: Daniel Stefański (Poland)

1 September 2018 FIFA World Cup qualification	Norway	2–0	Azerbaijan	Oslo, Norway
20:45 (UTC+2); Match 824	King 31' (pen.); Sadygov 60' (o.g.)	Report (FIFA); Report (UEFA)		Stadium: Ullevaal Stadion; Attendance: 8,599; Referee: Daniel Stefański (Poland)

4 September 2018 FIFA World Cup qualification	Germany	6–0	Norway	Stuttgart, Germany
20:45 (UTC+2); Match 825	Özil 10'; Draxler 17'; Werner 21', 40'; Goretzka 50'; Gómez 79'	Report (FIFA); Report (UEFA)		Stadium: Mercedes-Benz Arena; Attendance: 53,814; Referee: Gediminas Mažeika (Lithuania)

5 October 2018 FIFA World Cup qualification	San Marino	0–8	Norway	Serrvalle, San Marino
20:45 (UTC+2); Match 826		Report (FIFA); Report (UEFA)	Henriksen 8'; King 14' (pen.), 17'; Elyounoussi 39', 48', 68'; Selnæs 58'; Linnes 86'	Stadium: San Marino Stadium; Attendance: 1,922; Referee: Andrew Dallas (Scotland)

8 October 2018 FIFA World Cup qualification	Norway	1–0	Northern Ireland	Oslo, Norway
20:45 (UTC+2); Match 827	Brunt 71' (o.g.)	Report (FIFA); Report (UEFA)		Stadium: Ullevaal Stadion; Attendance: 10,244; Referee: Serhiy Boyko (Ukraine)

11 November Exhibition game	Macedonia	2–0	Norway	Skopje, Macedonia
18:30 (UTC+1); Match 828	Pandev 43'; Markoski 90+4'	Report		Stadium: Telekom Arena; Attendance: 3,000; Referee: Paolo Tagliavento (Italy)

14 November Exhibition game	Slovakia	1–0	Norway	Trnava, Slovakia
18:00 (UTC+1); Match 829	Lobotka 90+3'	Report		Stadium: Anton Malatinský Stadium; Attendance: 5,973; Referee: Farkas Ádam (Hungary

=== 2018 ===
23 March Exhibition game	Norway	4–1	Australia	Oslo, Norway
18:00 (UTC+1); Match 830	Kamara 36', 57', 90+1'; Reginiussen 48'	Report	Irvine 19'	Stadium: Ullevaal Stadion; Attendance: 5,871; Referee: Andreas Ekberg (Sweden)

26 March Exhibition game	Albania	0–1	Norway	Elbasan, Albania
19:00 UTC+2; Match 831		Report	Rosted 70'	Stadium: Elbasan Arena; Attendance: 5,000; Referee: Fyodor Zammit (Malta)

2 June Exhibition game	Iceland	2–3	Norway	Reykjavík, Iceland
20:00 UTC+2; Match 832	Finnbogason 30' (pen.); G. Sigurðsson 78'	Report	Johnsen 15'; King 80'; Sørloth 85'	Stadium: Laugardalsvöllur; Attendance: 9,147; Referee: Jonas Eriksson (Sweden)

6 June Exhibition game	Norway	1–0	Panama	Oslo, Norway
19:00 UTC+2; Match 833	King 4'	Report		Stadium: Ullevaal Stadion; Attendance: 7,458; Referee: Serdar Gözübüyük (Netherlands)

6 September 2018–19 UEFA Nations League	Norway	2–0	Cyprus	Oslo, Norway
20:45 UTC+2; Match 834	Johansen 21', 42'	Report		Stadium: Ullevaal Stadion; Attendance: 6,172; Referee: István Kovács (Romania)

9 September 2018–19 UEFA Nations League	Bulgaria	1–0	Norway	Sofia, Bulgaria
19:00 UTC+3; Match 835	Vasilev 59'	Report		Stadium: Vasil Levski National Stadium; Attendance: 7,100; Referee: Daniel Stefański (Poland)

13 October 2018–19 UEFA Nations League	Norway	1–0	Slovenia	Oslo, Norway
18:00 UTC+2; Match 836	Selnæs 45+5'	Report		Stadium: Ullevaal Stadion; Attendance: 14,712; Referee: Daniel Siebert (Germany)

16 October 2018–19 UEFA Nations League	Norway	1–0	Bulgaria	Oslo, Norway
20:45 UTC+2; Match 837	M. Elyounoussi 31'	Report		Stadium: Ullevaal Stadion; Attendance: 9,523; Referee: John Beaton (Scotland)

16 November 2018–19 UEFA Nations League	Slovenia	1–1	Norway	Ljubljana, Slovenia
20:45 UTC+1; Match 838	Verbič 9'	Report	Johnsen 85'	Stadium: Stožice Stadium; Attendance: 10,254; Referee: Ruddy Buquet (France)

19 November 2018–19 UEFA Nations League	Cyprus	0–2	Norway	Nicosia, Cyprus
21:45 UTC+2; Match 839		Report	Kamara 36', 48'	Stadium: GSP Stadium; Attendance: 1,513; Referee: István Vad (Hungary)

=== 2019 ===
23 March UEFA Euro 2020 qualifying	Spain	2–1	Norway	Valencia, Spain
20:45 UTC+1; Match 840	Rodrigo 16'; Ramos 71' (pen.)	Report	King 65' (pen.)	Stadium: Mestalla; Attendance: 39,752; Referee: Andris Treimanis (Latvia)

26 March UEFA Euro 2020 qualifying	Norway	3–3	Sweden	Oslo, Norway
20:45 UTC+1; Match 841	Johnsen 41'; King 59'; Kamara 90+7'	Report	Claesson 70'; Nordtveit 86' (o.g.); Quaison 90+1'	Stadium: Ullevaal Stadion; Attendance: 23,459; Referee: Gianluca Rocchi (Italy)

7 June UEFA Euro 2020 qualifying	Norway	2–2	Romania	Oslo, Norway
20:45 UTC+2; Match 842	T. Elyounoussi 56'; Ødegaard 70'	Report	Keșerü 77', 90+2'	Stadium: Ullevaal Stadion; Attendance: 17,664; Referee: Sergei Karasev (Russia)

10 June UEFA Euro 2020 qualifying	Faroe Islands	0–2	Norway	Tórshavn, Faroe Islands
19:45 UTC+1; Match 843		Report	Johnsen 49', 83'	Stadium: Tórsvøllur; Attendance: 3,083; Referee: Donatas Rumšas (Lithuania)

5 September UEFA Euro 2020 qualifying	Norway	2–0	Malta	Oslo, Norway
20:45 UTC+2; Match 844	Berge 34'; King 45+1' (pen.)	Report		Stadium: Ullevaal Stadion; Attendance: 11,269; Referee: Dumitru Muntean (Moldova)

8 September UEFA Euro 2020 qualifying	Sweden	1–1	Norway	Solna, Sweden
20:45 UTC+2; Match 845	Forsberg 60'	Report	Johansen 45'	Stadium: Friends Arena; Attendance: 38,372; Referee: Slavko Vinčić (Slovenia)

12 October UEFA Euro 2020 qualifying	Norway	1–1	Spain	Oslo, Norway
20:45 UTC+2; Match 846	King 90+4' (pen.)	Report	Saúl 47'	Stadium: Ullevaal Stadion; Attendance: 25,200; Referee: Michael Oliver (England)

15 October UEFA Euro 2020 qualifying	Romania	1–1	Norway	Bucharest, Romania
21:45 UTC+3; Match 847	Mitriță 62'	Report	Sørloth 90+2'	Stadium: Arena Națională; Attendance: 29,854; Referee: Bobby Madden (Scotland)

15 November UEFA Euro 2020 qualifying	Norway	4–0	Faroe Islands	Oslo, Norway
18:00 UTC+1; Match 848	Reginiussen 4'; Fossum 8'; Sørloth 62', 65'	Report		Stadium: Ullevaal Stadion; Attendance: 10,400; Referee: Fran Jović (Croatia)

18 November UEFA Euro 2020 qualifying	Malta	1–2	Norway	Ta' Qali, Malta
20:45 UTC+1; Match 849	Fenech 40'	Report	King 7'; Sørloth 62'	Stadium: National Stadium; Attendance: 2,708; Referee: Aliyar Aghayev (Azerbaijan)
