= 2014 La Manga Cup =

Tournament details
- Host country: Spain
- Dates: February 20 – February 26
- Teams: 4 (from 1 confederation)
- Venue(s): 1 (in 1 host city)

Final positions
- Champions: Sogndal
- Runners-up: Brann
- Third place: Start
- Fourth place: Aalesund

Tournament statistics
- Matches played: 6
- Goals scored: 17 (2.83 per match)
- Top scorer(s): Matthías Vilhjálmsson; Espen Hoff; Start (2)

The 2014 La Manga Cup is an exhibition international club football (soccer) competition featuring football club teams from Europe, which was held in February 2014. All matches were played in La Manga Stadium in La Manga, Spain. This was the seventeenth La Manga Cup.

== Teams ==
The following four clubs participated in the 2014 tournament:

- (Norway) Aalesund
- (Norway) Brann
- (Norway) Sogndal
- (Norway) Start

== Standings ==
Pl	Team	Pld	W	D	L	GF	GA	GD	Pts
1	(Norway) Sogndal	3	3	0	0	4	1	+3	9
2	(Norway) Brann	3	1	1	1	3	3	+0	4
3	(Norway) Start	3	1	0	2	6	6	+0	3
4	(Norway) Aalesund	3	0	1	2	3	6	-3	1

== Matches ==
20 February 2014
17:00 (CET)

Aalesund (Norway)	0–1	(Norway) Sogndal
		Karadas 26'

La Manga Stadium, Murcia, Spain
20 February 2014
20:00 (CET)

Start (Norway)	1–2	(Norway) Brann
Hoff 36'		Huseklepp 22'; Barmen 86'

La Manga Stadium, Murcia, Spain

23 February 2014
17:00 (CET)

Sogndal (Norway)	2–1	(Norway) Start
Hopen 4'; Mane 32' (pen.)		Lind 27'

La Manga Stadium, Murcia, Spain
23 February 2014
20:00 (CET)

Brann (Norway)	1–1	(Norway) Aalesund
Orlov 84'		Aarøy 17'

La Manga Stadium, Murcia, Spain

26 February 2014
(CET)

Sogndal (Norway)	1–0	(Norway) Brann
Opseth 77'

La Manga Stadium, Murcia, Spain
26 February 2014
(CET)

Aalesund (Norway)	2–4	(Norway) Start
Ulvestad 34'; James 56'		Kristjánsson 45+2'; Hoff 51'; Vilhjálmsson 67', 81'

La Manga Stadium, Murcia, Spain

== Winners ==
Winners of the 2014 La Manga Cup

Sogndal
