= Vesa Vasara =

Finnish football manager and former player (born 1976)

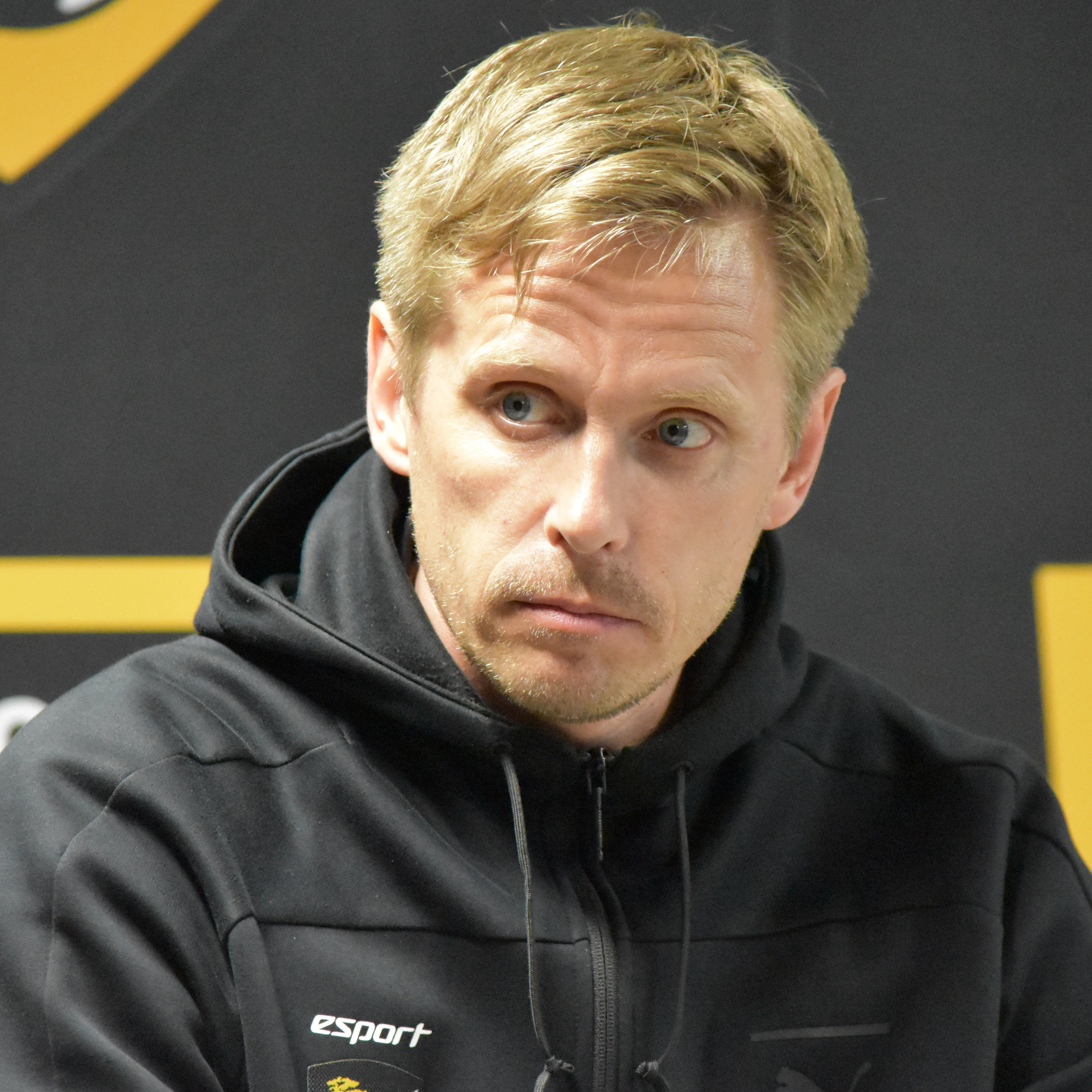
- Vasara with Honka in 2018

Personal information
- Full name: Vesa-Pekka Vasara
- Date of birth: 16 August 1976 (age 50)
- Place of birth: Helsinki, Finland
- Height: 1.78 m (5 ft 10 in)
- Position: Winger

Team information
- Current team: Inter Turku (manager)

Youth career
- MPS

Senior career*
Years	Team	Apps	(Gls)
1992–1993	MPS	30	(5)
1994–2000	HJK	136	(17)
2001	Jokerit	29	(0)
2002–2003	Kalmar	32	(2)
2004	Jaro	24	(4)
2005–2007	Honka	59	(8)

International career
	Finland U21	11	(2)
1999–2002	Finland	12	(2)

Managerial career
- 2009–2011: Honka II
- 2017–2023: Honka
- 2024–: Inter Turku
- * Club domestic league appearances and goals

Vesa-Pekka Vasara (born 16 August 1976) is a Finnish professional football manager and former player who is currently the manager of Veikkausliiga club Inter Turku.

He played for Veikkausliiga sides HJK, Jokerit, Jaro, and Honka, as well as for Kalmar in the Swedish Allsvenskan. Vasara was capped 12 times for the Finland national team, scoring twice.

== Playing career ==
Vasara started his career with MPS in Malmi, North Helsinki, before joining HJK in 1994.

On 26 August 1998, Vasara scored a goal for HJK against Metz, in the 2nd leg of the UEFA Champions League play-off round, helping his team to get a 1–1 away draw (2–1 on aggregate) and qualify to the group stage of the UEFA Champions League, as the first-ever Finnish club. Vasara ultimately spent six seasons with HJK.

Later he played for Kalmar in the Swedish Allsvenskan, and for Jokerit, Jaro and Honka in the Veikkausliiga.

== Managerial career ==
Vasara was selected as the Veikkausliiga Manager of the Month for June 2018 while managing Veikkausliiga side Honka. He worked as the manager of Honka for seven seasons, until the club was declared for bankruptcy at the end of the 2023 season, and he was released.

Vasara was subsequently named the manager of a fellow Veikkausliiga side Inter Turku, signing a two-year deal with the club, starting in the 2024 season. They won two consecutive Finnish League Cup titles in 2024 and 2025, and reached the final of the 2024 Finnish Cup. In 2026, Vasara led Inter Turku to win a domestic treble of the Finnish Cup, League Cup and the Veikkausliiga title, which was his first championship title as a head coach.

== Personal life ==
His brother Jussi Vasara is also a former professional footballer.

== Career statistics ==
=== Club ===
Appearances and goals by club, season and competition
Club	Season	League			Europe		Total	
Club	Season	Division	Apps	Goals	Apps	Goals	Apps	Goals
MPS	1992	Kolmonen						
MPS	1993	Kakkonen						
MPS	Total		30	5	0	0	30	5
Vantaan Pallo-70	1994	Kakkonen	7	5	–		7	5
Honka	1994	Kolmonen	13	5	–		13	5
HJK	1995	Veikkausliiga	24	2	4 (Note: Appearances in UEFA Intertoto Cup)	0	28	2
HJK	1996	Veikkausliiga	23	1	3 (Note: Appearances in UEFA Cup)	1	26	2
HJK	1997	Veikkausliiga	25	5	2 (Note: Appearances in UEFA Cup Winners' Cup)	0	27	5
HJK	1998	Veikkausliiga	23	2	6 (Note: Appearances in UEFA Champions League)	1	29	3
HJK	1999	Veikkausliiga	25	6	4	0	29	6
HJK	2000	Veikkausliiga	16	1	1	0	17	1
HJK	Total		136	17	20	2	156	19
Käpylän Pallo (loan)	1999	Kakkonen	1	0	–		1	0
Jokerit	2001	Veikkausliiga	29	0	2	0	31	0
Kalmar FF	2002	Allsvenskan	15	0	–		15	0
Kalmar FF	2003	Allsvenskan	17	2	–		17	2
Kalmar FF	Total		32	2	0	0	32	2
Jaro	2004	Veikkausliiga	24	4	–		24	4
Honka	2005	Ykkönen	22	2	–		22	2
Honka	2006	Veikkausliiga	23	5	–		23	5
Honka	2007	Veikkausliiga	14	1	–		14	1
Honka	Total		59	8	0	0	59	8
Career total			329	40	22	2	351	42

=== International ===
Appearances and goals by national team and year
National team	Year	Apps	Goals
Finland
Finland	1999	1	0
Finland	2000	6	2
Finland	2001	4	0
Finland	2002	1	0
Total		12	2

Finland's score listed first, score column indicates score after each Vasara goal.

List of international goals scored by Vesa Vasara
No.	Date	Venue	Opponent	Score	Result	Competition
1	4 February 2000	La Manga Stadium, La Manga, Spain	Denmark	1–0	2–1	2000–01 Nordic Football Championship
2	4 February 2000	La Manga Stadium, La Manga, Spain	Denmark	2–1	2–1	2000–01 Nordic Football Championship

== Managerial statistics ==
As of 14 November 2026

Managerial record by team and tenure
Team	Nat	From	To	Record				
Team	Nat	From	To	P	W	D	L	W%
Honka	(Finland)	1 January 2017	31 December 2023	257	124	66	67	48.25
Inter Turku	(Finland)	1 January 2024	Present	134	77	29	28	57.46
Total				391	201	95	95	51.41

== Honours ==
=== As a player ===
HJK

- Veikkausliiga: 1997
- Finnish Cup: 2000

=== As a manager ===
Honka

- Finnish Cup runner-up: 2023
- Finnish League Cup: 2022
- Ykkönen runner-up: 2017

Inter Turku

- Veikkausliiga: 2026
- Finnish Cup: 2026
- Finnish Cup runner-up: 2024
- Finnish League Cup: 2024, 2025, 2026

Individual

- Veikkausliiga Manager of the Month: May 2025
