= 2000–01 Nordic Football Championship =

Tournament details
- Host country: On the road
- Dates: 31 January 2000 – 1 February 2001
- Teams: 6

Final positions
- Champions: Finland (1st title)
- Runners-up: Iceland
- Third place: Denmark
- Fourth place: Norway

Tournament statistics
- Matches played: 14
- Goals scored: 32 (2.29 per match)
- Top scorer(s): (Iceland) Ríkharður Daðason (4 goals)

The 2000–01 Nordic Football Championship was the fourteenth and final Nordic Football Championship staged. Six Nordic countries participated, Denmark, the Faroe Islands, Finland, Iceland, Norway and Sweden. The tournament was partially played during a joint training camp in La Manga, Spain.

== Standings ==
	Team	Pld	W	D	L	GF	GA	GD	Pts
1.	Finland	5	4	0	1	7	3	+4	12
2.	Iceland	5	3	1	1	7	5	+2	10
3.	Denmark	5	2	0	3	7	8	–1	6
4.	Norway	4	1	2	1	6	6	0	5
5.	Sweden	5	1	2	2	3	4	–1	5
6.	Faroe Islands	4	0	1	3	2	6	–4	1

== Results ==
31 January 2000

Denmark	0–1	Sweden
	Report	Allbäck 22'

La Manga Stadium, La Manga
Attendance: 500
Referee: Rune Pedersen (Norway)

31 January 2000

Iceland	0–0	Norway
	Report

La Manga Stadium, La Manga
Attendance: 250
Referee: Nicolai Vollquartz (Denmark)

31 January 2000

Faroe Islands	0–1	Finland
	Report	Sumiala 57'

La Manga Stadium, La Manga
Attendance: 102
Referee: Gylfi Þór Orrason (Iceland)

2 February 2000

Denmark	2–4	Norway
Lassen 1'; Andersen 89'	Report	Berg 50', 90'; Lund 55', 90'

La Manga Stadium, La Manga
Attendance: 750
Referee: Karl-Erik Nilsson (Sweden)

2 February 2000

Finland	0–1	Iceland
	Report	Daðason 45'

La Manga Stadium, La Manga
Attendance: 350
Referee: Lassin Isaksen (Faroe Islands)

4 February 2000

Norway	1–1	Sweden
Carew 83'	Report	Andersson 87' (pen.)

La Manga Stadium, La Manga
Attendance: 600
Referee: Mikko Vuorela (Finland)

4 February 2000

Faroe Islands	2–3	Iceland
Mørkøre 19'; Jónsson 37'	Report	Daðason 40', 57'; Gunnlaugsson 66'

La Manga Stadium, La Manga
Attendance: 57
Referee: Rune Pedersen (Norway)

4 February 2000

Denmark	1–2	Finland
Møller 71'	Report	Vasara 33', 89'

La Manga Stadium, La Manga
Attendance: 300
Referee: Karl-Erik Nilsson (Sweden)

16 August 2000

Iceland	2–1	Sweden
Daðason 38'; Sigurðsson 84' (pen.)	Report	Mjällby 23'

Laugardalsvöllur, Reykjavík
Attendance: 5,116
Referee: Kenny Clark (Scotland)

16 August 2000

Faroe Islands	0–2	Denmark
	Report	Sand 55'; Nielsen 59'

Tórsvøllur, Tórshavn
Attendance: 6,478
Referee: Jon Skjervold (Norway)

16 August 2000

Finland	3–1	Norway
Litmanen 24', 61'; Kuqi 90'	Report	Helstad 54'

Finnair Stadium, Helsinki
Attendance: 10,748
Referee: Mario van der Ende (Netherlands)

2 September 2000

Iceland	1–2	Denmark
Sverrisson 10'	Report	Tomasson 26'; Bisgaard 49'

Laugardalsvöllur, Reykjavík
Attendance: 7,092
Referee: Stéphane Bré (France)

31 January 2001

Sweden	0–0	Faroe Islands
	Report

Tipshallen, Växjö
Attendance: 2,204
Referee: Terje Hauge (Norway)

1 February 2001

Sweden	0–1	Finland
	Report	Marjamaa 37'

Tipshallen, Jönköping
Attendance: 2,196
Referee: Roy Helge Olsen (Norway)

2001

Norway	Cancelled	Faroe Islands

== Winners ==
2000–01 Nordic Football Championship winners

Finland
First title

== Statistics ==
=== Goalscorers ===
There were 32 goals scored in 14 matches, for an average of 2.29 goals per match.

4 goals

- (Iceland) Ríkharður Daðason

2 goals

- (Finland) Jari Litmanen
- (Finland) Vesa Vasara
- (Norway) Henning Berg
- (Norway) Andreas Lund

1 goal

- (Denmark) Søren Andersen
- (Denmark) Morten Bisgaard
- (Denmark) Peter Lassen
- (Denmark) Peter Møller
- (Denmark) Brian Steen Nielsen
- (Denmark) Ebbe Sand
- (Denmark) Jon Dahl Tomasson
- (Faroe Islands) Todi Jónsson
- (Faroe Islands) Kurt Mørkøre
- (Finland) Shefki Kuqi
- (Finland) Timo Marjamaa
- (Finland) Antti Sumiala
- (Iceland) Bjarki Gunnlaugsson
- (Iceland) Helgi Sigurðsson
- (Iceland) Eyjólfur Sverrisson
- (Norway) John Carew
- (Norway) Thorstein Helstad
- (Sweden) Marcus Allbäck
- (Sweden) Anders Andersson
- (Sweden) Johan Mjällby

== See also ==
Balkan Cup
Baltic Cup
Central European International Cup
Mediterranean Cup
