= 2012 La Manga Cup =

Tournament details
- Host country: Spain
- Dates: February 15 – February 22
- Teams: 6 (from 1 confederation)
- Venue(s): 1 (in 1 host city)

Final positions
- Champions: (Denmark) FC Nordsjælland (1st title)
- Runners-up: (Norway) Vålerenga
- Third place: (Norway) Viking

Tournament statistics
- Matches played: 9
- Goals scored: 24 (2.67 per match)

The 2012 La Manga Cup was an exhibition international club football (soccer) competition featuring football club teams from Europe, which was held in February 2012. All matches were played in La Manga Stadium in La Manga, Spain. This was the fifteenth La Manga Cup. The tournament was won by FC Nordsjælland, who beat Vålerenga on goal differential after both clubs finished with identical records of two wins and one draw.

== Teams ==
The following six clubs participated in the 2012 tournament:

- FC Dnipro Dnipropetrovsk from the Ukrainian Premier League in Ukraine
- FC Nordsjælland from the Danish Superliga in Denmark
- FK Ekranas from the A Lyga in Lithuania
- Strømsgodset from the Tippeligaen in Norway
- Vålerenga from the Tippeligaen in Norway
- Viking from the Tippeligaen in Norway

== Standings ==
With only six teams entered, the 2012 version of the Cup was contested in a Round Robin style format, wherein each participating team played against three of the other five teams entered in the competition, with the winner determined by points earned.

Pl	Team	Pld	W	D	L	GF	GA	GD	Pts
1	(Denmark) FC Nordsjælland	3	2	1	0	8	3	+5	7
2	(Norway) Vålerenga	3	2	1	0	3	0	+3	7
3	(Norway) Viking	3	1	2	0	5	4	+1	5
4	(Norway) Strømsgodset	3	1	0	2	4	4	+0	3
5	(Ukraine) FC Dnipro	3	0	2	1	2	5	−3	2
6	(Lithuania) FK Ekranas	3	0	0	3	2	8	−6	0

== Matches ==
February 15, 2012
18:00 CET

Viking (Norway)	2–1	(Lithuania) FK Ekranas
André Danielsen 42'; Veton Berisha 90+3'		Marko Anđelković 10'

La Manga Stadium, Murcia, Spain
February 16, 2012
15:00 CET

FC Dnipro Dnipropetrovsk (Ukraine)	1–4	(Denmark) FC Nordsjælland

La Manga Stadium, Murcia, Spain
February 16, 2012
18:00 CET

Strømsgodset (Norway)	0–1	(Norway) Vålerenga

La Manga Stadium, Murcia, Spain

February 19, 2012
15:00 CET

FC Nordsjælland (Denmark)	2–0	(Norway) Strømsgodset

La Manga Stadium, Murcia, Spain
February 19, 2012
16:00 CET

FC Dnipro Dnipropetrovsk (Ukraine)	1–1	(Norway) Viking
Penalties
	1 – 3

La Manga Stadium, Murcia, Spain
February 19, 2012
18:00 CET

Vålerenga (Norway)	2–0	(Lithuania) FK Ekranas

La Manga Stadium, Murcia, Spain

February 22, 2012
12:00 CET

Strømsgodset (Norway)	4–1	(Lithuania) FK Ekranas

La Manga Stadium, Murcia, Spain
February 22, 2012
15:00 CET

FC Nordsjælland (Denmark)	2–2	(Norway) Viking
Penalties
	2 – 4

La Manga Stadium, Murcia, Spain
February 22, 2012
18:00 CET

Vålerenga (Norway)	0–0	(Ukraine) FC Dnipro Dnipropetrovsk
Penalties
	9 – 8

La Manga Stadium, Murcia, Spain
