= 2011 La Manga Cup =

Tournament details
- Host country: Spain
- Dates: February 14 – February 22
- Teams: 8 (from 1 confederation)
- Venue(s): 1 (in 1 host city)

Final positions
- Champions: (Norway) Viking (1st title)
- Runners-up: (Norway) Start
- Third place: (Denmark) Randers FC

Tournament statistics
- Matches played: 12
- Goals scored: 23 (1.92 per match)

The 2011 La Manga Cup was an exhibition international club football (soccer) competition featuring football club teams from Europe, which was held in February 2011. All matches were played in La Manga Stadium in La Manga, Spain. This was the fourteenth La Manga Cup. The tournament was won by Viking, who beat Start on goal differential after both clubs finished with identical records of two wins and one draw.

== Teams ==
The following 8 clubs participated in the 2011 tournament:

- FC Midtjylland from the Danish Superliga in Denmark
- Esbjerg fB from the Danish Superliga in Denmark
- Randers FC from the Danish Superliga in Denmark
- Kalmar FF from the Allsvenskan in Sweden
- Strømsgodset from Tippeligaen in Norway
- Viking from Tippeligaen in Norway
- Odd Grenland from Tippeligaen in Norway
- Start from Tippeligaen in Norway

== Standings ==
With eight teams entered, the 2011 version of the Cup was contested in a Round Robin style format, wherein each participating team played against three of the other seven teams entered in the competition, with the winner determined by points earned.

Pl	Team	Pld	W	D	L	GF	GA	GD	Pts
1	(Norway) Viking	3	2	1	0	6	4	+2	7
2	(Norway) Start	3	2	1	0	3	1	+2	7
3	(Denmark) Randers FC	3	1	2	0	2	0	+2	5
4	(Norway) Strømsgodset	3	1	2	0	1	0	+1	5
5	(Denmark) FC Midtjylland	3	0	2	1	3	4	−1	2
6	(Denmark) Esbjerg fB	3	0	2	1	2	3	−1	2
7	(Norway) Odd Grenland	3	0	2	1	3	5	−2	2
8	(Sweden) Kalmar FF	3	0	0	3	3	6	−3	0

== Matches ==
February 14, 2011
15:00 CET

Kalmar FF (Sweden)	1–2	(Norway) Start

La Manga Stadium, Murcia, Spain
February 14, 2011
18:00 CET

Viking (Norway)	1–1	(Denmark) FC Midtjylland
Penalties
	6 – 5

La Manga Stadium, Murcia, Spain
February 15, 2011
15:00 CET

Strømsgodset (Norway)	0–0	(Denmark) Esbjerg fB
Penalties
	5 – 6

La Manga Stadium, Murcia, Spain
February 15, 2011
18:00 CET

Randers FC (Denmark)	2–0	(Norway) Odd Grenland

La Manga Stadium, Murcia, Spain

February 17, 2011
15:00 CET

Kalmar FF (Sweden)	2–3	(Norway) Viking

La Manga Stadium, Murcia, Spain
February 17, 2011
18:00 CET

Start (Norway)	1–0	(Denmark) FC Midtjylland

La Manga Stadium, Murcia, Spain
February 18, 2011
15:00 CET

Esbjerg fB (Denmark)	1–1	(Norway) Odd Grenland

La Manga Stadium, Murcia, Spain
February 18, 2011
18:00 CET

Strømsgodset (Norway)	0–0	(Denmark) Randers FC

La Manga Stadium, Murcia, Spain

February 20, 2011
18:00 CET

Odd Grenland (Norway)	2–2	(Denmark) FC Midtjylland

La Manga Stadium, Murcia, Spain
February 21, 2011
18:00 CET

Randers FC (Denmark)	0–0	(Norway) Start

La Manga Stadium, Murcia, Spain
February 22, 2011
15:00 CET

Kalmar FF (Sweden)	0–1	(Norway) Strømsgodset

La Manga Stadium, Murcia, Spain
February 22, 2011
18:00 CET

Esbjerg fB (Denmark)	1–2	(Norway) Viking

La Manga Stadium, Murcia, Spain
