= Anders Andersson (footballer) =

Swedish footballer

Personal information
- Date of birth: 15 March 1974 (age 52)
- Place of birth: Tomelilla, Sweden
- Height: 1.74 m (5 ft 9 in)
- Position: Defensive midfielder

Senior career*
Years	Team	Apps	(Gls)
1990–1997	Malmö FF	126	(19)
1997–1999	Blackburn Rovers	4	(0)
1999–2001	AaB	70	(8)
2001–2004	Benfica	49	(1)
2004–2005	→ Belenenses (loan)	36	(0)
2005–2008	Malmö FF	56	(0)
Total		341	(28)

International career
1989–1991	Sweden U17	30	(1)
1991	Sweden U19	1	(0)
1992–1995	Sweden U21/O	25	(3)
1995–1997	Sweden B	2	(0)
1994–2005	Sweden	27	(3)
- * Club domestic league appearances and goals

Per Anders Andersson (Swedish pronunciation: [ˈanː.dɛʂ ˈanː.dɛʂˌsɔn]; born 15 March 1974) is a Swedish former professional footballer who played as a defensive midfielder. Starting off his career with Malmö FF in the early 1990s, Andersson went on to play professionally in England, Denmark, and Portugal before returning to Malmö in 2005 to finish up his career. A full international between 1994 and 2005, Andersson won 27 caps for the Sweden national team and represented them at UEFA Euro 2000 and 2004. He was also a squad player for the Sweden Olympic football team at the 1992 Summer Olympics.

== Club career ==
Born in Tomelilla, Andersson played for Svenstorps IF as a child, but joined Malmö FF in 1990. He gradually became a star in the Allsvenskan, and was bought by English Premier League outfit Blackburn Rovers. There, he played four league matches, and scored once against Preston North End in the League Cup. He went on to play in Denmark and Portugal for Benfica, and returned to Malmö FF in July 2005. He remained in the club until the end of the 2008 season, when the team decided not to extend Anders contract. The news was received with dismay among Malmö supporters, and Anders himself has written about the situation at his blog at local newspaper Skånska Dagbladet. He later decided to retire from football, ending speculation that he might've been heading to local rivals Trelleborg.

== International career ==
=== Youth ===
After having represented the Sweden U17, U19, and U21 teams, Andersson was selected to represent the Sweden Olympic football team at the 1992 Summer Olympics in Barcelona.

=== Senior ===
Andersson made his senior debut for the Sweden national team in a friendly game against Mexico on 24 February 1994. He scored his first international goal in a 1–0 King's Cup win against Japan on 13 February 1997. He was a squad player for Sweden at UEFA Euro 2000, and came in from the bench in a group stage 0–0 draw against Turkey before Sweden failed to advance to the second round. Four years later, he was a squad player for Sweden at UEFA Euro 2004 and started in the final group stage game against Denmark, before Sweden was eliminated in the quarter finals by the Netherlands.

Andersson made his last international appearance on 9 February 2005 in a 1–1 draw with France. He won a total of 27 caps, scoring 3 goals.

== Career statistics ==
=== International ===
Appearances and goals by national team and year
National team	Year	Apps	Goals
Sweden	1994	1	0
Sweden	1995	0	0
Sweden	1996	1	0
Sweden	1997	7	1
Sweden	1998	0	0
Sweden	1999	0	0
Sweden	2000	7	1
Sweden	2001	0	0
Sweden	2002	0	0
Sweden	2003	4	0
Sweden	2004	6	1
Sweden	2005	1	0
Total		27	3

Scores and results list Sweden's goal tally first, score column indicates score after each Andersson goal.

List of international goals scored by Anders Andersson
No.	Date	Venue	Opponent	Score	Result	Competition
1	13 February 1997	National Stadium, Bangkok, Thailand	Japan	1–0	1–0	1997 King's Cup
2	4 February 2000	La Manga Club Football Stadium, La Manga, Spain	Norway	1–1	1–1	2000–01 Nordic Football Championship
3	28 May 2004	Ratina Stadium, Tampere, Finland	Finland	1–1	3–1	Friendly

== Honours ==
AaB

- Danish Superliga: 1998–99

Benfica

- Taça de Portugal: 2003–04

Sweden

- King's Cup: 1997
