= 2013 La Manga Cup =

Tournament details
- Host country: Spain
- Dates: February 10 – February 18
- Teams: 6 (from 1 confederation)
- Venue(s): 1 (in 1 host city)

Tournament statistics
- Matches played: 12
- Goals scored: 33 (2.75 per match)

The 2013 La Manga Cup was an exhibition international club football (soccer) competition featuring football club teams from Europe, which was held in February 2013. All matches were played in La Manga Stadium in La Manga Club, Spain. This was the sixteenth La Manga Cup.

== Teams ==
The following eight clubs participated in the 2013 tournament:

- (Norway) Aalesund
- (Romania) Astra Giurgiu
- (Russia) CSKA Moscow
- (Sweden) Kalmar
- (Norway) Lillestrøm
- (Denmark) Nordsjælland
- (Norway) Start
- (Norway) Vålerenga

== Standings ==
With only six teams entered, the 2012 version of the Cup was contested in a Round Robin style format, wherein each participating team played against three of the other seven teams entered in the competition, with the winner determined by points earned.

Pl	Team	Pld	W	D	L	GF	GA	GD	Pts
1	(Russia) CSKA Moscow	3	2	0	1	7	4	+3	6
2	(Norway) Vålerenga	3	2	0	1	5	3	+2	6
3	(Sweden) Kalmar	3	2	0	1	3	2	+1	6
4	(Norway) Aalesund	3	2	0	1	5	5	0	6
5	(Norway) Lillestrøm	3	2	0	1	3	3	0	6
5	(Romania) Astra Giurgiu	3	1	0	2	3	3	0	3
7	(Norway) Start	3	1	0	2	3	4	–1	3
8	(Denmark) Nordsjælland	3	0	0	3	4	9	–5	0

== Matches ==
10 February 2013
16:00 (CET)

Nordsjælland (Denmark)	2–3	(Norway) Aalesund
John 9'; Bech 18'	Report	James 50', 59', 62'

La Manga Stadium, La Manga Club, Spain
10 February 2013
18:45 (CET)

Start (Norway)	0–1	(Sweden) Kalmar
	Report	Mendes 90+3'

La Manga Stadium, La Manga Club, Spain

11 February 2013
16:00 (CET)

Astra Giurgiu (Romania)	0–1	(Norway) Lillestrøm
	Report	Helstad 85'

La Manga Stadium, La Manga Club, Spain
11 February 2013
19:00 (CET)

CSKA Moscow (Russia)	1–3	(Norway) Vålerenga
Love 56'; Berezutski (red card) 65'	Report	Børven 9', 41'; Larsen 68'

La Manga Stadium, La Manga Club, Spain

13 February 2013
16:00 (CET)

Aalesund (Norway)	0–2	(Romania) Astra Giurgiu
	Report	Fatai 59'; Enache 88'

La Manga Stadium, La Manga Club, Spain

14 February 2013
12:00 (CET)

Vålerenga (Norway)	0–1	(Sweden) Kalmar
	Report	Andersson 73'

La Manga Stadium, La Manga Club, Spain
14 February 2013
15:00 (CET)

Lillestrøm (Norway)	0–2	(Russia) CSKA Moscow
	Report	Østli 14' (o.g.); Love 67'

La Manga Stadium, La Manga Club, Spain
14 February 2013
18:00 (CET)

Start (Norway)	2–1	(Denmark) Nordsjælland
Hoff 4' (pen.); Castro 20'	Report	Marcondes 49'

La Manga Stadium, La Manga Club, Spain

17 February 2013
16:00 (CET)

Vålerenga (Norway)	2–1	(Romania) Astra Giurgiu
Muri 23'; Børven 34'	Report	Bruno 36'

La Manga Stadium, La Manga Club, Spain
17 February 2013
19:00 (CET)

CSKA Moscow (Russia)	4–1	(Denmark) Nordsjælland
Love 2', 90+1'; Dzagoev 67'; Okore 69' (o.g.)	Report	Bech 66'

La Manga Stadium, Murcia, Spain

18 February 2013
15:00 (CET)

Lillestrøm (Norway)	2–1	(Norway) Start
Gulbrandsen 2'; Fofana 80'	Report	Castro 79'

La Manga Stadium, La Manga Club, Spain
18 February 2013
19:00 (CET)

Aalesund (Norway)	2–1	(Sweden) Kalmar
Stewart 12', 76'	Report	Eriksson 86'

La Manga Stadium, La Manga Club, Spain

== Winners ==
Winners of the 2013 La Manga Cup
CSKA Moscow
