= 2015 La Manga Cup =

Tournament details
- Host country: Spain
- Dates: February 12 – March 17
- Teams: 32 (from 2 confederations)
- Venue: 1 (in 1 host city)

Tournament statistics
- Matches played: 29
- Goals scored: 73 (2.52 per match)

The 2015 La Manga Cup is an exhibition international club football (soccer) competition featuring football club teams from Europe, which was held in February and March 2015. All matches were played in La Manga Stadium in La Manga Club, Spain. This was the eighteenth La Manga Cup.

== Teams ==
The following 32 clubs participated in the 2015 tournament:

- (Norway) Vålerenga Fotball
- (Denmark) AGF Aarhus
- (Norway) Viking FK
- (Norway) Tromsø IL
- (Norway) IK Start
- (Norway) Aalesunds FK
- (Norway) Sarpsborg 08 FF
- (Norway) Sogndal Fotball
- (Norway) SK Brann
- (Norway) Sandefjord Fotball
- (Norway) Sandnes Ulf
- (Norway) Fredrikstad FK
- (Norway) Ranheim Fotball
- (Norway) Mjøndalen IF
- (Norway) IL Hødd
- (Norway) Hønefoss BK
- (Norway) Bærum SK
- (Norway) Strømmen IF
- (Norway) Åsane Fotball
- (Norway) FK Jerv
- (Norway) Bryne FK
- (Norway) Levanger FK
- (Norway) Kristiansund BK
- (Norway) Stabæk Fotball
- (Norway) Nest-Sotra Fotball
- (Norway) Follo FK
- (Spain) LMC
- (Spain) LMC 1
- (Spain) LMC 2
- (Spain) LMC 3

== Standings ==
=== Group 1 ===
| Pl | Team | Pld | W | D | L | GF | GA | GD | Pts |
|---|---|---|---|---|---|---|---|---|---|
| 1 | (Norway) Vålerenga Fotball | 2 | 1 | 1 | 0 | 2 | 0 | +2 | 4 |
| 2 | (Denmark) AGF Aarhus | 3 | 1 | 1 | 1 | 4 | 5 | -1 | 4 |
| 3 | (Norway) Viking FK | 2 | 1 | 0 | 1 | 5 | 4 | +1 | 3 |
| 4 | LMC | 1 | 0 | 0 | 1 | 0 | 2 | -2 | 0 |

== Matches ==
12 February 2015
15:30 (CET)

| Viking FK (Norway) | 5–2 | (Denmark) AGF Aarhus |
|---|---|---|
| Adegbenro 49'; Böðvarsson 51' (pen.); Bjørdal 78' (o.g.); Þorsteinsson 90+1'; Berisha 90+3' | | Kjær 21', 29' |

Viking Stadion, Stavanger, Norway

15 February 2015
21:00 (CET)

| Viking FK (Norway) | 0–2 | (Norway) Vålerenga Fotball |
|---|---|---|
| | | Ómarsson 14'; Zahid 42' |

La Manga Stadium, La Manga Club, Spain
Referee: Dag Vidar Hafsås
15 February 2015
17:00 (CET)

| AGF Aarhus (Denmark) | 2–0 | (Spain) LMC |
|---|---|---|
| Lange 41', 90' |

Atletion, Aarhus, Denmark

18 February 2015
19:00 (CET)

| AGF Aarhus (Denmark) | 0–0 | (Norway) Vålerenga Fotball |

Atletion, Aarhus, Denmark
