= 2010 La Manga Cup =

Tournament details
- Host country: Spain
- Dates: February 18 – February 26
- Teams: 8 (from 2 confederations)
- Venue: 1 (in 1 host city)

Final positions
- Champions: (Norway) Molde (1st title)
- Runners-up: (Denmark) FC Nordsjælland
- Third place: (Norway) Rosenborg

Tournament statistics
- Matches played: 12
- Goals scored: 30 (2.5 per match)

The 2010 La Manga Cup was an exhibition international club football (soccer) competition featuring football club teams from Europe and North America, which was held in February 2010. All matches were played in La Manga Stadium in La Manga Club, Spain. This was the thirteenth La Manga Cup. The tournament was won by Molde, who beat FC Nordsjælland 2–1 in the final.

== Teams ==
The following eight clubs participated in the 2010 tournament:

- FC Midtjylland from the Danish Superliga in Denmark
- FC Nordsjælland from the Danish Superliga in Denmark
- SønderjyskE from the Danish Superliga in Denmark
- Seattle Sounders FC from Major League Soccer in the United States of America
- Molde from Tippeligaen in Norway
- Rosenborg from Tippeligaen in Norway
- Brann from Tippeligaen in Norway
- Stabæk from Tippeligaen in Norway

== Matches ==
The following games are part of the tournament.

=== Quarterfinals ===
February 18, 2010
15:00 CET

Stabæk (Norway)	0–1	(Denmark) FC Nordsjælland

La Manga Stadium, Murcia, Spain
February 18, 2010
18:00 CET

Rosenborg (Norway)	3–0	(United States) Seattle Sounders FC
Moldskred 2'; Skjelbred 18'; Moldskred (yellow card) 24'; Prica 66'		Ianni (yellow card) 51'

La Manga Stadium, Murcia, Spain
February 19, 2010
15:00 CET

Brann (Norway)	1–1	(Denmark) FC Midtjylland
Penalties
	5 – 6

La Manga Stadium, Murcia, Spain
February 19, 2010
18:00 CET

SønderjyskE (Denmark)	0–2	(Norway) Molde
Søren Frederiksen (yellow card) 70'; Olafur Ingi Skulason (yellow card) 74'; Jesper Kristoffersen (red card) 90'		Pape Paté Diouf 8'; Baye Djiby Fall 38'; Mattias Moström (yellow card) 87'

La Manga Stadium, Murcia, Spain

=== Semifinals Places 5-8 ===
February 21, 2010
15:00 CET

Seattle Sounders FC (United States)	2–0	(Norway) Stabæk
Montero 31'; Levesque 43'; Riley (yellow card) 49'

La Manga Stadium, Murcia, Spain
February 22, 2010
15:00 CET

Brann (Norway)	3–1	(Denmark) SønderjyskE

La Manga Stadium, Murcia, Spain

=== Semifinals Places 1-4 ===
February 21, 2010
18:00 CET

Rosenborg (Norway)	3–3	(Denmark) FC Nordsjælland
Penalties
	3 – 5

La Manga Stadium, Murcia, Spain
February 22, 2010
18:00 CET

Molde (Norway)	2–0	(Denmark) FC Midtjylland
Vegard Forren (yellow card) 29'; Baye Djiby Fall 45'; Magne Simonsen (yellow card) 51'; Daniel Berg Hestad (yellow card) 90'; Björn Runström 90'		Kolja Afriyie (yellow card) 83'

La Manga Stadium, Murcia, Spain

=== Seventh Place Match ===
February 25, 2010
12:00 CET

SønderjyskE (Denmark)	0–2	(Norway) Stabæk

La Manga Stadium, Murcia, Spain

=== Fifth Place Match ===
February 25, 2010
15:00 CET

Seattle Sounders FC (United States)	1–0	(Norway) Brann
Neagle 84'

La Manga Stadium, Murcia, Spain

=== Third Place Match ===
February 25, 2010
18:00 CET

Rosenborg (Norway)	2–0	(Denmark) FC Midtjylland

La Manga Stadium, Murcia, Spain

=== Final ===
February 26, 2010
18:00 CET

Molde (Norway)	2–1	(Denmark) FC Nordsjælland
Baye Djiby Fall 57'; Björn Runström 74'		Nicki Bille Nielsen 67'

La Manga Stadium, Murcia, Spain

== Final Placement ==
#	Team
1	(Norway) Molde
2	(Denmark) FC Nordsjælland
3	(Norway) Rosenborg
4	(Denmark) FC Midtjylland
5	(United States) Seattle Sounders FC
6	(Norway) Brann
7	(Norway) Stabæk
8	(Denmark) SønderjyskE
