= La Manga Cup =

- Founded: 1999
- Region: Europe (UEFA)
- Teams: Various
- Current champions: Vålerenga (2nd title)
- Most championships: Rosenborg (3 titles)
- Website: La Manga Club
- 2015 La Manga Cup

La Manga Cup is a winter football tournament played in La Manga Club, La Manga del Mar Menor (Murcia, Spain). Usual participants are clubs from countries with a summer football season: Sweden, Finland, Denmark, Norway, Russia, Ukraine, and the United States and Canada. The first cup was played in 1999 and was won by Rosenborg, who are the most successful team to date with three wins.

== Winners ==
Years	Winners	Runners-up	Third place
1999	(Norway) Rosenborg	(Norway) Stabæk	(Norway) Brann
2000	(Denmark) Brøndby IF	(Norway) Rosenborg	(Sweden) Helsingborgs IF
2001	(Norway) Rosenborg	(Sweden) AIK	(Russia) FC Lokomotiv Moscow
2002	(Sweden) Helsingborgs IF	(Norway) Lillestrøm	(Norway) Viking
2003	(Norway) Rosenborg	(Norway) Odd Grenland	(United States) Los Angeles Galaxy
2004	(United States) MetroStars	(Norway) Viking	(United States) San Jose Earthquakes
2005	(Russia) Rubin Kazan	(Norway) Lillestrøm	(Norway) Lyn
2006	(Russia) Rubin Kazan	(Russia) Krylia Sovetov	(Russia) Dynamo Moscow
2007	(Norway) Vålerenga	(Norway) Lillestrøm	(Norway) Rosenborg
2008 (I)	(Ukraine) Shakhtar Donetsk	(Norway) Viking	(Norway) Stabæk
2008 (II)	(Sweden) Kalmar FF	(Denmark) Brøndby IF	(Norway) Tromsø
2009	(Finland) FC Honka	(Denmark) FC Nordsjælland	(Russia) Krylia Sovetov
2010	(Norway) Molde	(Denmark) FC Nordsjælland	(Norway) Rosenborg
2011	(Norway) Viking	(Norway) Start	(Denmark) Randers FC
2012	(Denmark) FC Nordsjælland	(Norway) Vålerenga	(Norway) Viking
2013	(Russia) CSKA Moscow	(Norway) Vålerenga	(Sweden) Kalmar
2014	(Norway) Sogndal	(Norway) Brann	(Norway) Start
2015	(Norway) Vålerenga	(Norway) Tromsø	(Denmark) AGF Aarhus

== Performance ==
=== Performance by club ===
Club	Winners	Runners-up	Winning years
(Norway) Rosenborg	3	1	1999, 2001, 2003
(Norway) Vålerenga	2	2	2007, 2015
(Russia) Rubin Kazan	2	–	2005, 2006
(Denmark) FC Nordsjælland	1	2	2012
(Norway) Viking	1	2	2011
(Denmark) Brøndby IF	1	1	2000
(Russia) CSKA Moscow	1	–	2013
(Ukraine) Shakhtar Donetsk	1	–	2008 (I)
(Sweden) Helsingborgs IF	1	–	2002
(Sweden) Kalmar FF	1	–	2008 (II)
(Norway) Molde	1	–	2010
(Norway) Sogndal	1	–	2014
(Finland) FC Honka	1	–	2009
(United States) MetroStars	1	–	2004

=== Performance by country ===
Country	Winners	Runners-up	Third place
Norway	8	13	9
Russia	3	1	3
Denmark	2	3	2
Sweden	2	1	2
United States	1	–	2
Finland	1	–	–
Ukraine	1	–	–
