= Peter Lassen (footballer) =

Danish footballer (born 1966)

Personal information
- Full name: Peter Lassen
- Date of birth: 4 October 1966 (age 60)
- Place of birth: Copenhagen, Denmark
- Position: Forward

Youth career
- Vebro

Senior career*
Years	Team	Apps	(Gls)
?	Hvidovre KFUM	?	(?)
?	Køge BK	?	(?)
?	Hvidovre IF	?	(?)
1991–1992	Boldklubben Frem	28	(4)
?	Hvidovre IF		
?–1996	Akademisk Boldklub		
1996–1999	Eendracht Aalst		
1999–2000	Silkeborg IF		(16)
Total		28+	(20+)
- * Club domestic league appearances and goals

Peter Lassen (born 4 October 1966) is a Danish former football striker, who was the top goalscorer of the 1999–2000 Danish Superliga. He most notably played for Danish clubs Hvidovre IF, BK Frem, Akademisk Boldklub and Silkeborg IF, as well as Eendracht Aalst in Belgium.
