= Søren Andersen =

Danish footballer (born 1970)

Personal information
- Date of birth: 31 January 1970 (age 56)
- Place of birth: Aarhus, Denmark
- Height: 1.81 m (5 ft 11 in)
- Position: Forward

Youth career
- 1984–1988: Silkeborg IF

Senior career*
Years	Team	Apps	(Gls)
1989–1993	AGF Aarhus	109	(51)
1993–1994	Lleida	22	(2)
1994–1995	Rayo Vallecano	10	(1)
1995	IFK Norrkoping	10	(4)
1995–1998	Aalborg BK	67	(30)
1998–1999	Bristol City	39	(10)
1999–2001	Odense BK	57	(24)
2001–2003	AGF Aarhus	18	(6)
Total		332	(128)

International career
1985–1986	Denmark U17	17	(4)
1988	Denmark U19	5	(1)
1990–1992	Denmark U21	7	(0)
1993–2000	Denmark	12	(0)
- * Club domestic league appearances and goals

Søren Andersen (born 31 January 1970) is a Danish former professional footballer. He played as a striker, and most prominently represented English club Bristol City, Spanish club Rayo Vallecano, as well as several Danish clubs. He won the 1992 Danish Cup with AGF Aarhus. Andersen played 12 games for the Denmark national team, though he did not score, and represented Denmark at the 1992 Summer Olympics and 1996 European Championship tournaments.

== Career ==
Andersen began his career as a junior with Silkeborg IF, joining AGF Aarhus in August 1989. He made his debut for the Danish under-21 national team in April 1990. He won the 1992 Danish Cup with AGF, and was included in the Danish under-21 squad for the 1992 Summer Olympics by coach Viggo Jensen. He played a single match at the tournament; his seventh and last games for the under-21 national team. He made his debut for the senior Danish national team in January 1993, under national coach Richard Møller Nielsen.

Having scored 51 goals in 109 league games for AGF, Andersen moved abroad in October 1993. He went on to play for Spanish club UE Lleida in La Liga. He played a single season at Lleida, where he scored the winning goal in a 2–1 win against multiple Spanish champions Real Madrid. When Lleida were relegated to the Segunda División at the end of the season, Andersen moved to Segunda División rivals Rayo Vallecano. He played 12 games for Rayo, scoring a single goal.

In January 1995, Andersen moved to Swedish club IFK Norrköping, before going back to Denmark. He went on to play for defending Danish champions Aalborg Boldspilklub (AaB) in August 1995. At Aalborg, he was poised to replace striker Erik Bo Andersen who had been sold to Rangers. Søren Andersen became an instant success, and was called up for the Danish squad at the 1996 European Championship, where he played a single match. He was AaB's lead goalscorer in the 1996–97 season with 14 goals, the fifth highest tally of the league. He scored a total of 36 goals in 77 games for AaB, including five goals in a single game against Viborg FF.

In July 1998, Andersen moved to England, joining Bristol City of the First Division for a fee of £425,000. He scored both City goals on his debut, a 2–2 draw at home to Oxford United. In the 1998–99 season, in which City were relegated, he scored 10 goals out of 29 in a forward partnership with Ade Akinbiyi. He left City in September 1999, returning to Denmark to join Odense BK, costing the Danish side £200,000. He left Odense to rejoin his former club AGF Aarhus in November 2001. He was injured in early March 2002, badly breaking his arm in a collision with Sweden international goalkeeper Magnus Kihlstedt, in a game against Kihlstedt's club FC København. He ended his career in March 2003, due to chronically aching achilles tendons.

== Honours ==
- Danish Cup: 1992
