= La Manga =

Cape in the Region of Murcia, Spain

Coordinates: 37°43′52″N 0°44′21″W

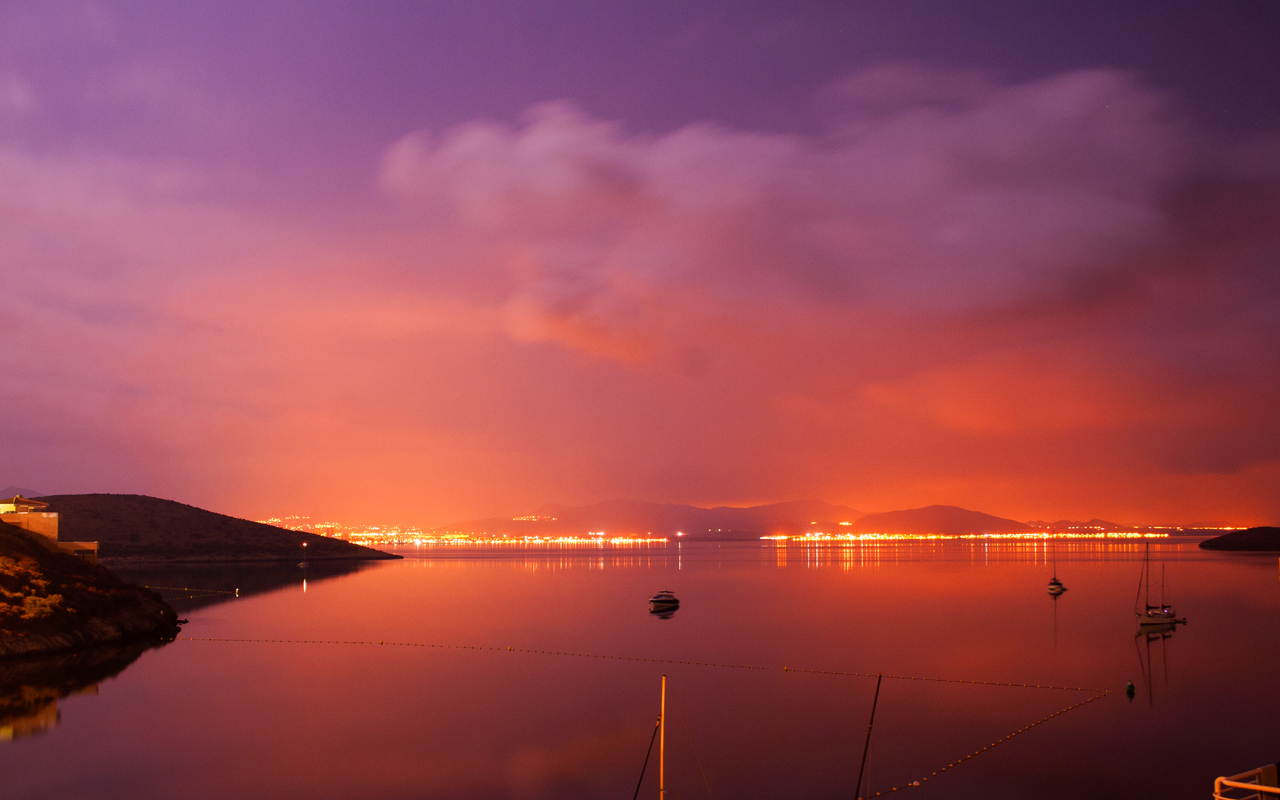

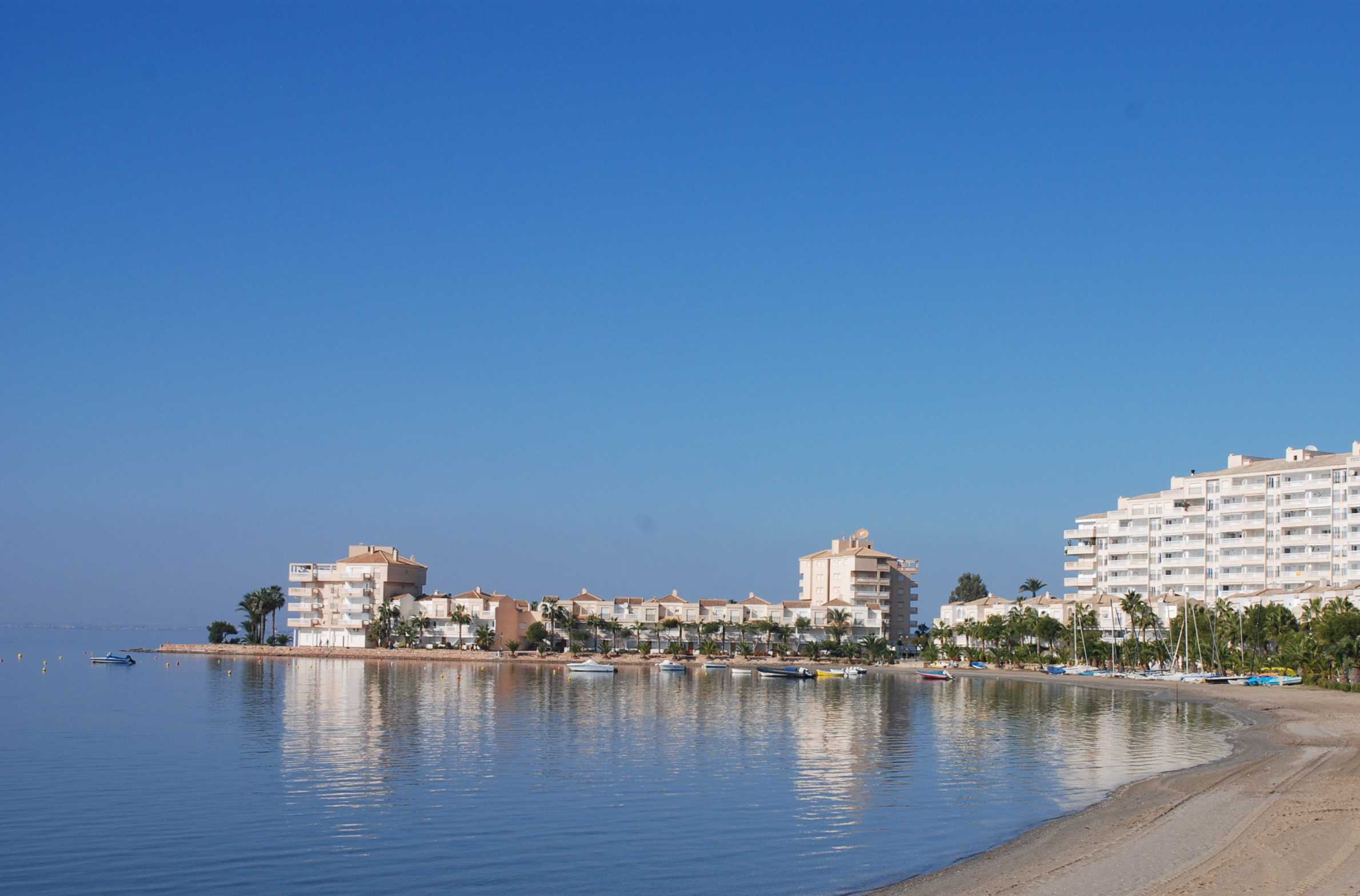
El Pedrucho, La Manga

La Manga (Spanish pronunciation: [la ˈmaŋɡa]), or La Manga del Mar Menor (meaning "The Sandbar of the Minor Sea") is a seaside spit of Mar Menor in the Region of Murcia, Spain.

The strip is 21 km long and 100 metres wide (average), separating the Mediterranean Sea from the Mar Menor (Minor Sea) lagoon, from Cabo de Palos to the Punta del Mojón.

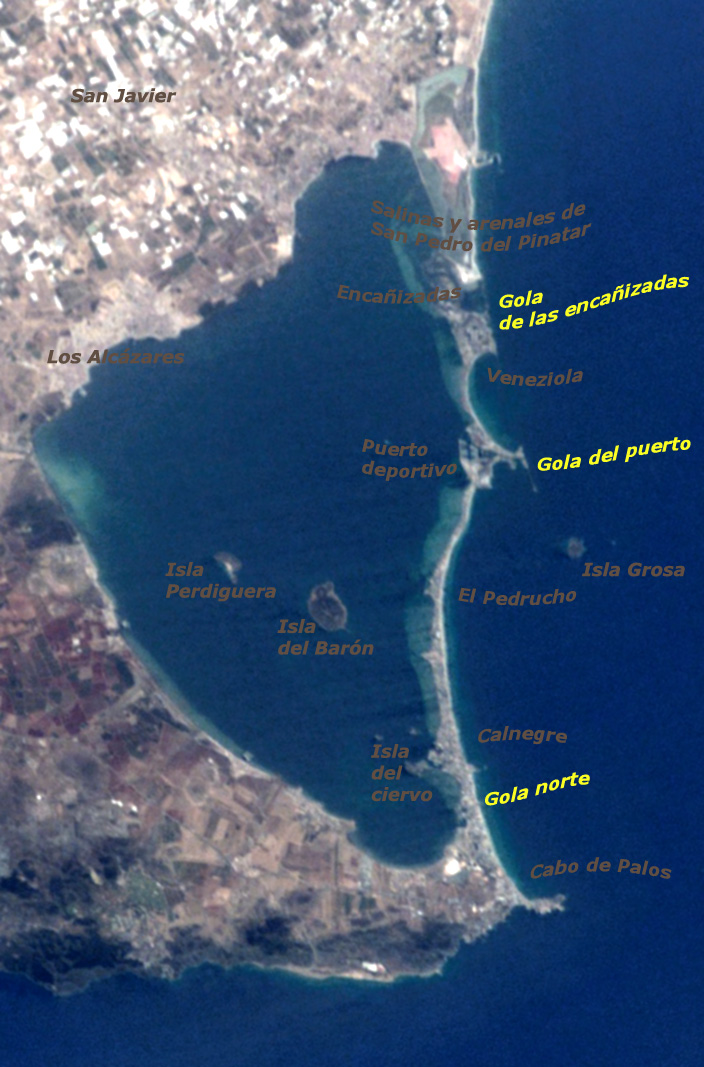
Satellite view.

Historically, it was known by the Romans as Palus and later by the Moors as Al Buhayrat Al Qsarand. In the 17th century its name changed to Mar Chico, meaning "small sea" and later as El Mar Menor. Originally, it was a bay opening into the Mediterranean; at either end, volcanic reefs gradually held back the sand and sediment that was dragged along by the sea currents to form a sandy column of dunes and rock vegetation and long beaches in contact with two seas. La Manga sandbar is cut off by natural channels that keep the two seas in contact with each other; the so-called golas allow water from the Mediterranean into the lake. As such, the space was untouched until the 1960s, when La Manga was discovered as a tourist resort and underwent a transformation which included the urbanisation of the area and the construction of tourist infrastructures.

In 1938, during the Spanish Civil War, the Battle of Cape Palos took place near the cape. Its lighthouse began operating on January 31, 1865. The cape is part of a marine reserve, the Reserva Marina de Cabo de Palos e Islas Hormigas.

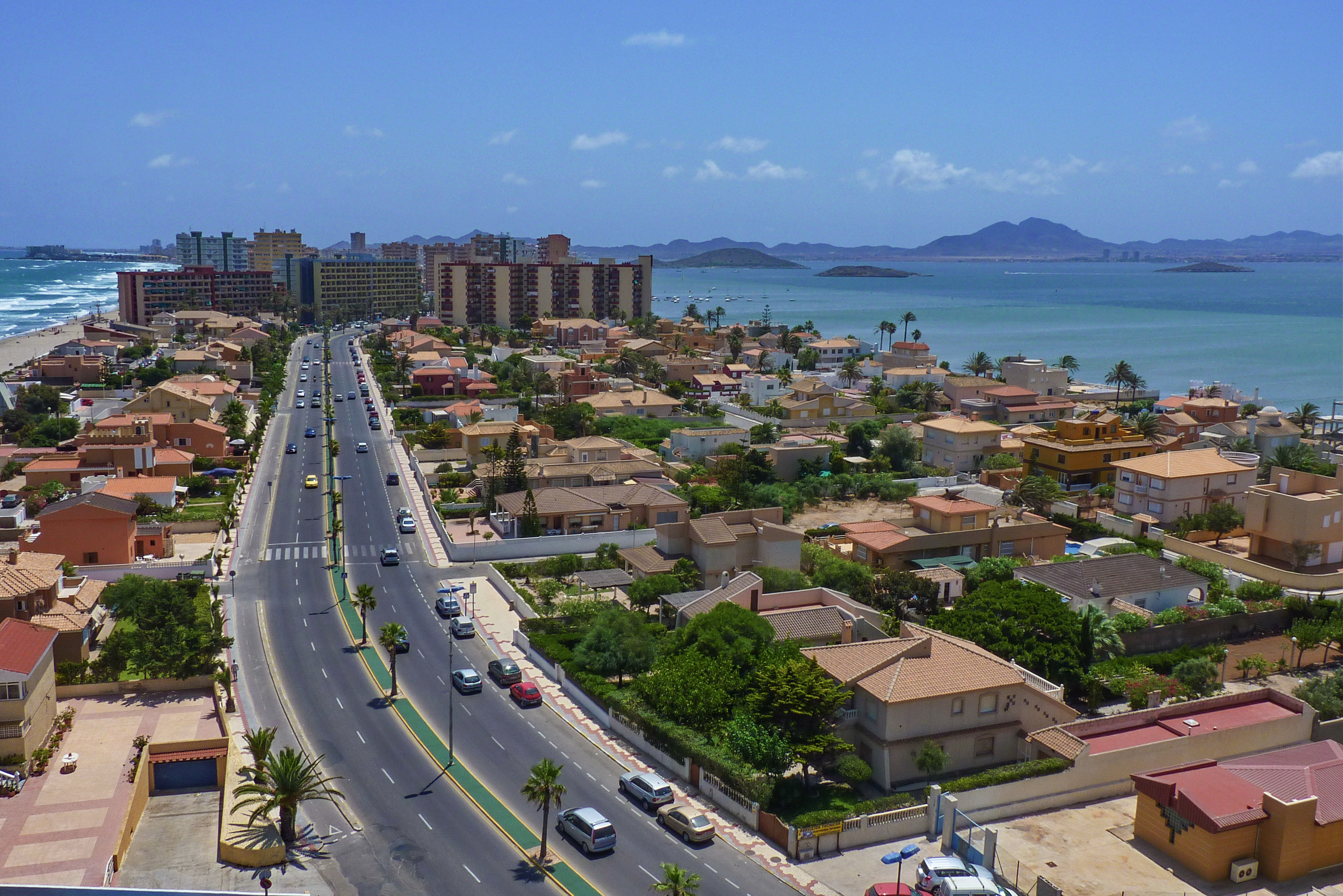
El Galán, La Manga

The nearest airport Región de Murcia International Airport is located just over 50 kilometres by road.

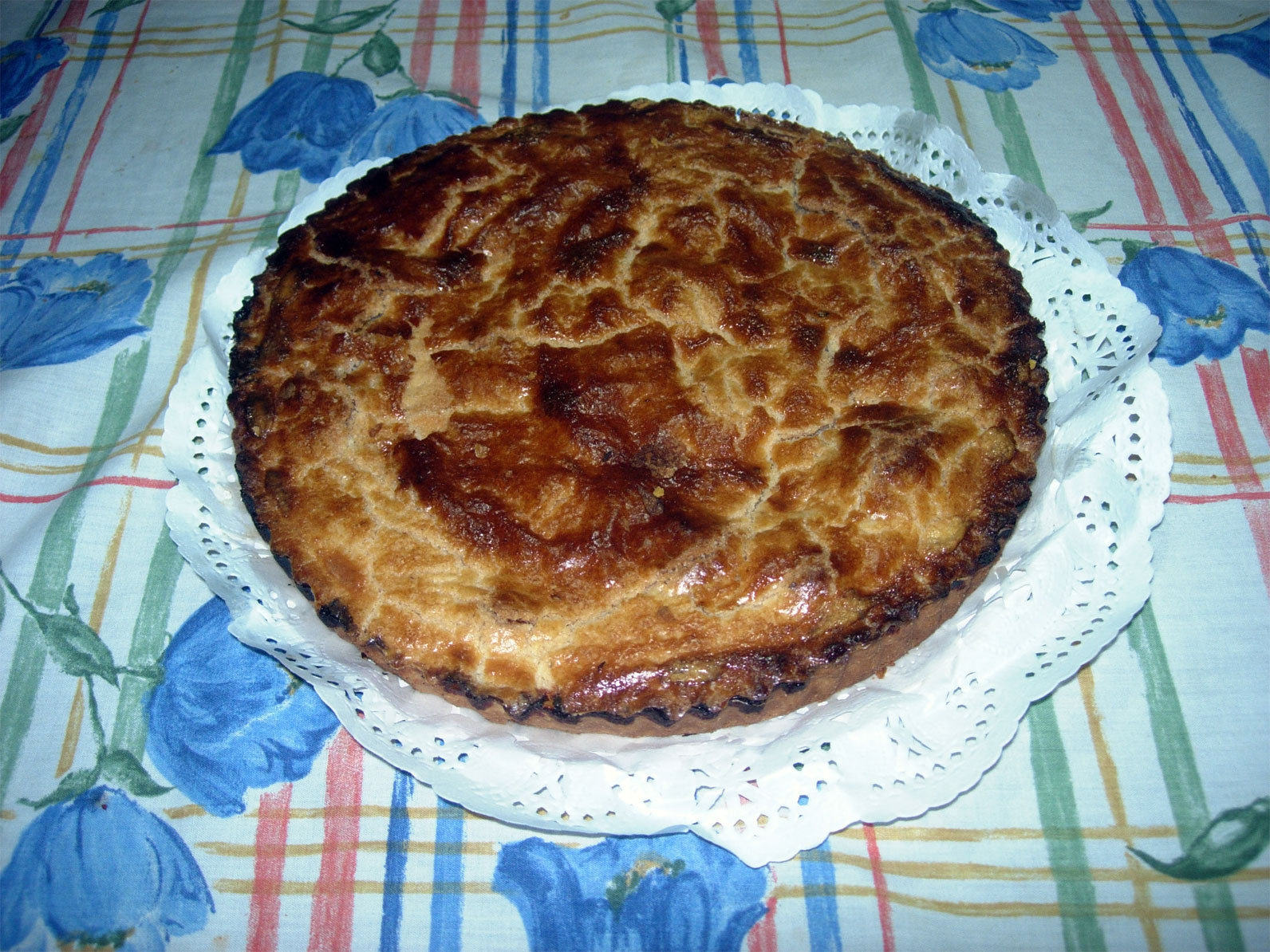
Cierva's cake, typical food of Mar Menor

== Sports ==
The Mar Menor with its 5 islands and having shallow and protected waters, lends itself to being an International waterbased Sports Station.

There are sailing and skiing schools that run periodical courses, as well as windsurfing and catamarans, and canoeing. In the nearby town of Los Belones is a stadium, La Manga Stadium, known for hosting numerous football clubs from all over the world during the winter months. La Manga Cup at La Manga Club has been staged every year since 1999. The 2011, 2012, and 2013 Copa del Sol tournaments were also held partly at the stadium, as well as many of the 2000–01 Nordic Football Championship matches.

== Climate ==
La Manga has a hot semi-arid climate (Köppen climate classification: BSh) with mild, moderately dry winters and hot, humid summers, but with very little rainfall. Although there is no long-term climate data, recent data indicate that the region experiences few temperature variations throughout the year due to the strong influence of the Mediterranean Sea and the Mar Menor, in addition to the high average annual humidity. Winter temperatures are mild, rarely falling below 5 °C (41 °F), while summers are muggy, with frequent and very humid tropical nights. The weather station is located about 3.5 km (2.2 mi) from La Manga.

Climate data for Cartagena/Salina Cabo Palos (2022-2024), extremes (2022-present)
Month	Jan	Feb	Mar	Apr	May	Jun	Jul	Aug	Sep	Oct	Nov	Dec	Year
Record high °C (°F)	24.5 (76.1)	23.5 (74.3)	26.8 (80.2)	28.9 (84.0)	29.2 (84.6)	30.7 (87.3)	35.8 (96.4)	38.8 (101.8)	33.0 (91.4)	30.0 (86.0)	26.1 (79.0)	24.1 (75.4)	38.8 (101.8)
Mean daily maximum °C (°F)	17.0 (62.6)	16.9 (62.4)	18.8 (65.8)	20.3 (68.5)	23.2 (73.8)	27.0 (80.6)	30.5 (86.9)	31.1 (88.0)	28.4 (83.1)	25.0 (77.0)	21.5 (70.7)	17.9 (64.2)	23.1 (73.6)
Daily mean °C (°F)	12.6 (54.7)	13.3 (55.9)	14.9 (58.8)	16.5 (61.7)	19.5 (67.1)	23.7 (74.7)	27.1 (80.8)	27.8 (82.0)	24.8 (76.6)	21.5 (70.7)	17.4 (63.3)	13.7 (56.7)	19.4 (66.9)
Mean daily minimum °C (°F)	8.2 (46.8)	9.6 (49.3)	10.9 (51.6)	12.6 (54.7)	15.8 (60.4)	20.2 (68.4)	23.7 (74.7)	24.5 (76.1)	21.2 (70.2)	17.9 (64.2)	13.3 (55.9)	9.4 (48.9)	15.6 (60.1)
Record low °C (°F)	1.5 (34.7)	3.2 (37.8)	3.0 (37.4)	7.0 (44.6)	9.1 (48.4)	16.0 (60.8)	18.7 (65.7)	19.6 (67.3)	16.6 (61.9)	10.3 (50.5)	4.8 (40.6)	3.7 (38.7)	1.5 (34.7)
Average precipitation mm (inches)	17.4 (0.69)	5.2 (0.20)	59.4 (2.34)	32.9 (1.30)	47.3 (1.86)	12.7 (0.50)	0.1 (0.00)	0.3 (0.01)	54.6 (2.15)	38.0 (1.50)	34.1 (1.34)	34.0 (1.34)	336 (13.23)
Average precipitation days (≥ 1 mm)	2.0	1.0	11.0	5.0	4.0	2.5	0.0	0.0	4.5	4.0	3.5	4.5	42
Average relative humidity (%)	74	72	76	71	73	72	74	72	73	79	76	78	74
Source: Agencia Estatal de Meteorologia

== Panoramic view La Manga del Mar Menor ==
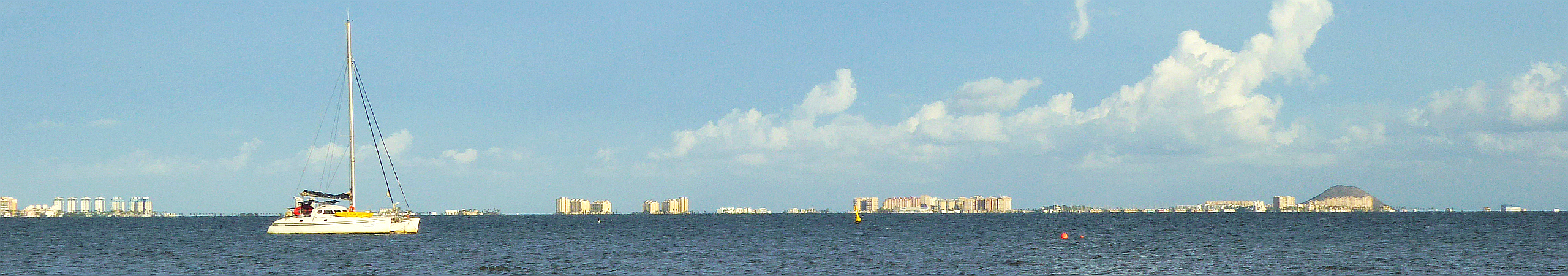
Panoramic view over Mar Menor and the length of 22 kilometers of La Manga del Mar Menor at the eastern horizon

== Notable people ==
- Dennis Waterman, actor best known for his roles in The Sweeney, Minder and New Tricks spent there for the final seven years from 2015 until his death in 2022.
