= La Manga Club Football Stadium =

Football stadium in Spain

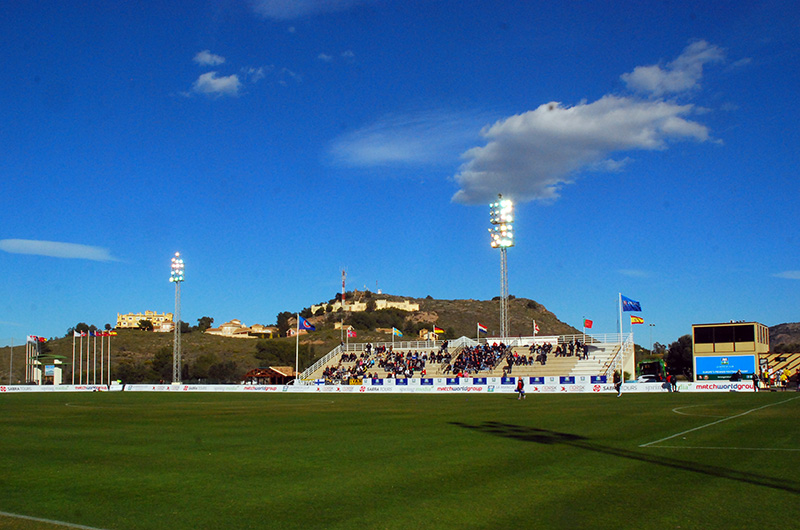
- Interactive map of La Manga Club Football Stadium
- Full name: La Manga Club Football Stadium
- Location: La Manga Club, Cartagena, Spain
- Coordinates: 37.60041°N 0.80903°W
- Owner: La Manga Club
- Operator: La Manga Club
- Capacity: 800

La Manga Club Football Stadium is a stadium in La Manga Club, located in southern Spain. It is a resort stadium and is used for friendly matches, as well as a resting and training place for Spain's national football team, FC Cartagena and other teams.

== Amenities ==
La Manga Club Football Stadium boasts of 8 natural grass football pitches of international FIFA standards, which are ideal for warm weather training camps, international tournaments and friendly matches.

The main stadium has seating capacity for up to 700 people, an electronic scoreboard, flood lights for evening games, a press room with panoramic views and WIFI connection.

In addition to Spain, England's national squads (both male and female) train at this facility. Real Madrid, FC Barcelona, Liverpool FC, Chelsea FC, Everton FC, Newcastle United FC, and FC Bayern are among the various clubs which utilizes the La Manga Football Stadium.
