= 2011 SK Brann season =

Brann
2011 season
- Manager: Rune Skarsfjord
- Stadium: Brann Stadion
- Tippeligaen: 4th
- Norwegian Cup: Runners-up
- Top goalscorer: League: Kim Ojo (15); All: Kim Ojo (18)

The 2011 season was SK Brann's 103rd season and their 25th consecutive season in the Tippeligaen.

== Information ==
| Head coach | Rune Skarsfjord |
| League | Tippeligaen |
| Shirt supplier | Kappa |
| Shirt sponsor | Sparebanken Vest |
| Average league attendance | 12977 (-5,58%) |
| League result | 4th |
| Norwegian Cup | Finale (1-2 against Aalesunds FK) |
| Top goalscorer | Kim Ojo (15 in league, 3 in cup, 18 in total) |
| Player of the year | Rudolph Austin |

== Season events ==
- January 6: Brann signed the Polish goalkeeper Piotr Leciejewski in a trade deal that sent Kenneth Udjus and Cato Hansen to the newly promoted Tippeligaen club Sogndal
- January 13: Zsolt Korcsmár signed a three-year deal with Brann. The Hungarian center back spent the last half of the 2010 season on loan at Brann Stadion.
- January 14: Christian Kalvenes signed a one-year extension to his contract. The local lad started his third spell with the club in June 2010 after a free transfer from Burnley.
- January 26: Brann signed Juninho on a 6-month loan deal. The young Brazilian spent the last half of the 2010 season on loan at the club.
- January 31: Erik Huseklepp was sold to the Serie A club Bari while Tijan Jaiteh went on a one-year loan to Danish side Randers.
- February 24: Brann signed Chukwuma "Bentley" Akabueze on a four-year deal. The young Nigerian spent four seasons at Odd Grenland before transferring to Brann.
- February 8: Brann signed Nicolás Mezquida on a five-month loan deal from the Uruguayan champions C.A. Peñarol.
- March 11: Erik Mjelde was announced as Brann's new Captain. The midfielder took over the armband from goalkeeper Håkon Opdal.
- March 17: Brann announced the club's youth squad for the 2011 season. The five junior players are allowed to play up to three matches in the Premiership without a professional contract and the club does not have to pay training compensations (link) to the players former clubs. This was a new rule set by the Norwegian FA to make it easier for clubs to utilise young national players on the highest level of Norwegian football.
- March 20: Brann opened the season with a 2-1 upset win against reigning champions Rosenborg. While Rosenborg were considered contenderes for the title by most experts before the season, Brann was deemed to have a tough season by most pundits, and many considered them relegation bound after losing key players like Erik Huseklepp, Petter Vaagan Moen and Jan Gunnar Solli and replacing them with Bosman players and youngsters. Kim Ojo scored and made an assist in his debut.
- July 6: Brann signed Tadas Labukas on a six-month contract. The Lithuanian striker came on a free transfer from Arka Gdynia.
- July 13: Nicolás Mezquida returned to C.A. Peñarol after Brann opted not to extend his loan deal.
- July 15: Juninho returned to Desportivo Brasil after spending six months on loan at Brann.
- July 18: Brann signed Maximiliano Bajter on a six-month loan deal from C.A. Peñarol.

== Squad ==
=== First team ===
Note: Flags indicate national team as defined under FIFA eligibility rules; some limited exceptions apply. Players may hold more than one non-FIFA nationality.

| No. | Pos. | Nation | Player |
|---|---|---|---|
| 2 | DF | ISL | Birkir Sævarsson |
| 3 | DF | NOR | Christian Kalvenes |
| 4 | DF | NOR | Lars Grorud |
| 5 | MF | JAM | Rudolph Austin |
| 6 | MF | NOR | Carl-Erik Torp |
| 7 | MF | NOR | Hassan El Fakiri |
| 8 | MF | NOR | Fredrik Haugen |
| 9 | FW | NGR | Kim Ojo |
| 10 | MF | NOR | Erik Mjelde (C) |
| 11 | FW | NGR | Bentley |
| 12 | GK | NOR | Håkon Opdal |

| No. | Pos. | Nation | Player |
|---|---|---|---|
| 15 | FW | URU | Diego Gustavino |
| 16 | MF | NOR | Bjarte Haugsdal |
| 18 | MF | URU | Maximiliano Bajter |
| 19 | FW | LTU | Tadas Labukas |
| 20 | FW | BRA | Juninho |
| 21 | DF | HUN | Zsolt Korcsmár |
| 24 | GK | POL | Piotr Leciejewski |
| 23 | FW | URU | Nicolás Mezquida |
| 25 | DF | NOR | Yaw Ihle Amankwah |
| 26 | DF | NOR | Bjørnar Holmvik |

=== Out on loan ===
Note: Flags indicate national team as defined under FIFA eligibility rules; some limited exceptions apply. Players may hold more than one non-FIFA nationality.

| No. | Pos. | Nation | Player |
|---|---|---|---|
| — | MF | GAM | Tijan Jaiteh (on loan to Randers) |

=== Youth squad ===
Five players without professional contracts who are allowed to play three league matches each season for the first team.

Note: Flags indicate national team as defined under FIFA eligibility rules; some limited exceptions apply. Players may hold more than one non-FIFA nationality.

| No. | Pos. | Nation | Player |
|---|---|---|---|
| 17 | DF | NOR | Lars Henrik Skage |
| 27 | MF | NOR | Kjetil Kalve |
| 28 | FW | NOR | Kristoffer Barmen |

| No. | Pos. | Nation | Player |
|---|---|---|---|
| 29 | MF | NOR | Eirik Birkelund |
| 36 | GK | NOR | Øystein Øvretveit |

== Team kit ==
The team kits for the 2011 season are produced by Kappa and the main shirt sponsor is Sparebanken Vest. Other sponsors featured on the kit are BKK (shoulders), JM (chest), AXA (left arm), Chess (upper back), Norne Securities (front of shorts), Coop Obs! (back of shorts) and Tide (socks). As of the 2011 season the Norwegian FA has made it compulsory for all Premiership teams to feature player names on the back of the shirts. On Brann's shirts the player's names are printed below the squad number.

| Home | Away | Goalkeeper 1 |

== Transfers ==
=== Players in ===
Only first team squad transfers

Winter 2010/11

- Lars Grorud from Sogndal.
- Fredrik Haugen from Løv-Ham.
- Carl-Erik Torp from Kongsvinger.
- Kim Ojo from Nybergsund-Trysil.
- Piotr Leciejewski from Sogndal.
- Zsolt Korcsmár from Újpest.
- Juninho from Desportivo Brasil (loan).
- Chukwuma "Bentley" Akabueze from Odd Grenland.
- Nicolás Mezquida from C.A. Peñarol (loan).

Summer 2010/11

- Tadas Labukas from Arka Gdynia.
- Maximiliano Bajter from C.A. Peñarol (loan).

=== Players out ===
Only first team squad transfers

Winter 2010/11

- Cato Guntveit retired from professional football.
- Eirik Bakke to Sogndal.
- David Nielsen retired.
- Gylfi Einarsson to Fylkir.
- Jan Gunnar Solli to New York Red Bulls.
- Petter Vaagan Moen to Queens Park Rangers.
- Matias Møvik to Løv-Ham.
- Kenneth Udjus to Sogndal.
- Cato Hansen to Sogndal.
- Erik Huseklepp to Bari.
- Tijan Jaiteh to Randers (loan).

Summer 2010/11

- Nicolás Mezquida to C.A. Peñarol (loan return).
- Juninho to Desportivo Brasil (loan return).

== Competitions ==
=== Tippeligaen ===
==== Results summary ====
| Overall | | | | | | | | Home | | | | | | Away | | | | | |
| Pld | W | D | L | GF | GA | GD | Pts | W | D | L | GF | GA | GD | W | D | L | GF | GA | GD |
|---|---|---|---|---|---|---|---|---|---|---|---|---|---|---|---|---|---|---|---|
| 30 | 14 | 6 | 10 | 51 | 49 | +2 | 48 | 9 | 3 | 3 | 21 | 15 | +6 | 5 | 3 | 7 | 30 | 34 | −4 |

==== Results by round ====
| Round | 1 | 2 | 3 | 4 | 5 | 6 | 7 | 8 | 9 | 10 | 11 | 12 | 13 | 14 | 15 | 16 | 17 | 18 | 19 | 20 | 21 | 22 | 23 | 24 | 25 | 26 | 27 | 28 | 29 | 30 |
|---|---|---|---|---|---|---|---|---|---|---|---|---|---|---|---|---|---|---|---|---|---|---|---|---|---|---|---|---|---|---|
| Ground | H | A | H | A | H | A | H | A | H | A | H | A | H | A | H | A | H | A | H | A | H | A | H | A | H | A | H | A | H | A |
| Result | W | W | L | D | L | W | W | L | W | L | W | L | D | W | W | L | W | W | D | D | D | D | W | L | L | L | W | W | W | L |
| Position | 6 | 2 | 3 | 5 | 9 | 4 | 2 | 5 | 3 | 8 | 6 | 6 | 7 | 5 | 3 | 4 | 3 | 4 | 2 | 3 | 3 | 3 | 3 | 4 | 5 | 6 | 5 | 4 | 3 | 4 |

Updated to match(es) played on 27 November 2011. Source: see below
A = Away; H = Home; W = Win; D = Draw; L = Loss

==== Results ====
| 20 March 2011 1 | Brann | 2–1 | Rosenborg | Bergen |
| 20:00 | Ojo 11'; Holmvik 42' | Report | Bakenga 68' | Stadium: Brann Stadion; Attendance: 16,732; Referee: Svein Oddvar Moen |

| 4 April 2011 2 | Lillestrøm | 1–4 | Brann | Lillestrøm |
| 19:00 | Ujah 29' | Report | Ojo 7'; Guastavino 10'; Korcsmár 43'; Sævarsson 69' | Stadium: Åråsen Stadion; Attendance: 7,416; Referee: Brage Sandmoen |

| 9 April 2011 3 | Brann | 0–1 | Fredrikstad | Bergen |
| 16:00 | | Report | Borges 5' | Stadium: Brann Stadion; Attendance: 15,501; Referee: Per Ivar Staberg |

| 15 April 2011 4 | Haugesund | 3–3 | Brann | Haugesund |
| 19:00 | Sørum 8', 9'; Mæland 26' | Report | Mjelde 1'; Ojo 35' (pen.); Guastavino 39' | Stadium: Haugesund Stadion; Attendance: 5,000; Referee: Svein-Erik Edvartsen |

| 25 April 2011 5 | Brann | 1–3 | Molde | Bergen |
| 18:00 | Mjelde 67' | Report | Diouf 10', 21'; Chima 90+2' | Stadium: Brann Stadion; Attendance: 12,537; Referee: Brage Sandmoen |

| 7 May 2011 6 | Vålerenga | 0–2 | Brann | Oslo |
| 16:00 | | Report | Ojo 14', 75' | Stadium: Ullevaal Stadion; Attendance: 16,674; Referee: Svein-Erik Edvartsen |

| 16 May 2011 7 | Brann | 2–1 | Start | Bergen |
| 18:00 | Ojo 49'; Austin 86' (pen.) | Report | Årst 75' (pen.) | Stadium: Brann Stadion; Attendance: 17,237; Referee: Tom Henning Øvrebø |

| 19 May 2011 8 | Strømsgodset | 1–0 | Brann | Drammen |
| 19:00 | Andersen 87' | Report | | Stadium: Marienlyst Stadion; Attendance: 6,012; Referee: Dag Vidar Hafsås |

| 29 May 2011 10 | Tromsø | 4–0 | Brann | Tromsø |
| 20:00 | Rushfeldt 37', 75', 82'; Høgli 90+2' (pen.) | Report | | Stadium: Alfheim Stadion; Attendance: 4,844; Referee: Svein Oddvar Moen |

| 10 June 2011 11 | Brann | 2–0 | Sogndal | Bergen |
| 19:00 | Guastavino 76'; Haugsdal 82' | Report | | Stadium: Brann Stadion; Attendance: 11,503; Referee: Espen Berntsen |

| 16 June 2011 12 | Viking | 3–0 | Brann | Stavanger |
| 20:00 | Sæternes 6', 43', 90' (pen.) | Report | | Stadium: Viking Stadion; Attendance: 5,623; Referee: Tommy Skjerven |

| 19 June 2011 13 | Brann | 1–1 | Aalesund | Bergen |
| 18:00 | Ojo 28' | Report | Barrantes 48' | Stadium: Brann Stadion; Attendance: 10,814; Referee: Kristoffer Helgerud |

| 27 June 2011 14 | Sarpsborg 08 | 3–5 | Brann | Sarpsborg |
| 19:00 | Roberts 20'; Giæver 61' (pen.); Breive 63' | Report | Korcsmár 38'; Mjelde 46'; Guastavino 52'; Ojo 76'; Austin 78' | Stadium: Sarpsborg Stadion; Attendance: 4,472; Referee: Per Ivar Staberg |

| 30 June 2011 9 | Brann | 2–0 | Odd Grenland | Bergen |
| 19:00 | Mjelde 30'; Bentley 30' | Report | | Stadium: Brann Stadion; Attendance: 12,043; Referee: Ken Henry Johnsen |
Note: The match was postponed from 22 May 2011 due to the player strike.

| 3 July 2011 15 | Brann | 2–1 | Stabæk | Bergen |
| 18:00 | Ojo 28'; Mjelde 41' | Report | Hedenstad 72' | Stadium: Brann Stadion; Attendance: 12,010; Referee: Svein-Erik Edvartsen |

| 18 July 2011 16 | Fredrikstad | 4–2 | Brann | Fredrikstad |
| 19:00 | Borges 8', 11', 68'; Hansen 83' | Report | Grorud 18'; Guastavino 32' | Stadium: Fredrikstad Stadion; Attendance: 10,304; Referee: Tom Henning Øvrebø |

| 31 July 2011 18 | Odd Grenland | 2–3 | Brann | Skien |
| 18:00 | Brenne 59'; Addo 84' | Report | Ojo 23'; Guastavino 37'; Haugen 63' | Stadium: Skagerak Arena; Attendance: 5,575; Referee: Espen Berntsen |

| 3 August 2011 17 | Brann | 3–2 | Viking | Bergen |
| 19:00 | Austin 44'; Guastavino 45+1'; Haugen 85' | Report | Nevland 66'; Sæternes 80' | Stadium: Brann Stadion; Attendance: 12,589; Referee: Tommy Skjerven |
Note: The match was postponed from 24 July 2011 due to the 2011 Norway attacks.

| 7 August 2011 19 | Brann | 0–0 | Strømsgodset | Bergen |
| 18:00 | | Report | | Stadium: Brann Stadion; Attendance: 12,470; Referee: Tom Henning Øvrebø |

| 21 August 2011 20 | Stabæk | 1–1 | Brann | Bærum |
| 20:00 | Andersson 62' | Report | Ojo 36' | Stadium: Telenor Arena; Attendance: 7,246; Referee: Svein Oddvar Moen |

| 26 August 2011 21 | Brann | 1–1 | Tromsø | Bergen |
| 19:00 | Austin 23' (pen.) | Report | Abdellaoue 45' | Stadium: Brann Stadion; Attendance: 11,639; Referee: Tommy Skjerven |

| 11 September 2011 22 | Molde | 2–2 | Brann | Molde |
| 21:10 | Eikrem 8', 37' | Report | Grorud 66', 90' | Stadium: Aker Stadion; Attendance: 9,151; Referee: Svein Oddvar Moen |

| 16 September 2011 23 | Brann | 1–0 | Haugesund | Bergen |
| 19:00 | Ojo 83' | Report | | Stadium: Brann Stadion; Attendance: 13,032; Referee: Espen Berntsen |

| 25 September 2011 24 | Sogndal | 1–0 | Brann | Sogndalsfjøra |
| 18:00 | Hopen 37' | Report | | Stadium: Fosshaugane Campus; Attendance: 5,623; Referee: Per Ivar Staberg |

| 2 October 2011 25 | Brann | 1–4 | Vålerenga | Bergen |
| 18:00 | Korcsmár 79' | Report | Gunnarsson 21'; Berre 35', 90'; Ogude 83' | Stadium: Brann Stadion; Attendance: 13,942; Referee: Tom Harald Hagen |

| 17 October 2011 26 | Start | 3–1 | Brann | Kristiansand |
| 19:00 | Hoff 39'; Årst 43'; Børufsen 49' | Report | Ojo 1' | Stadium: Sør Arena; Attendance: 6,290; Referee: Dag Vidar Hafsås |

| 23 October 2011 27 | Brann | 1–0 | Sarpsborg 08 | Bergen |
| 18:00 | Sævarsson 4' | Report | | Stadium: Brann Stadion; Attendance: 10,120; Referee: Kristoffer Helgerud |

| 30 October 2011 28 | Rosenborg | 3–6 | Brann | Trondheim |
| 20:00 | Lustig 21'; Bakenga 86'; Prica 90' | Report | Sævarsson 9', 58'; Austin 15' (pen.), 18'; Ojo 48'; Mjelde 62' | Stadium: Lerkendal Stadion; Attendance: 15,343; Referee: Tom Harald Hagen |

| 20 November 2011 29 | Brann | 2–0 | Lillestrøm | Bergen |
| 18:00 | Austin 27' (pen.); Ojo 72' | Report | | Stadium: Brann Stadion; Attendance: 13,004; Referee: Svein Oddvar Moen |

| 27 November 2011 30 | Aalesund | 3–1 | Brann | Ålesund |
| 18:00 | Olsen 12', 81'; Phillips 51' | Report | Mjelde 54' | Stadium: Color Line Stadion; Attendance: 9,793; Referee: Espen Berntsen |

==== Table ====
| Pos | Team | Pld | W | D | L | GF | GA | GD | Pts | Qualification or relegation |
|---|---|---|---|---|---|---|---|---|---|---|
| 2 | Tromsø | 30 | 15 | 8 | 7 | 56 | 34 | +22 | 53 | Qualification for the Europa League second qualifying round |
| 3 | Rosenborg | 30 | 14 | 7 | 9 | 69 | 44 | +25 | 49 | Qualification for the Europa League first qualifying round |
| 4 | Brann | 30 | 14 | 6 | 10 | 51 | 49 | +2 | 48 | |
| 5 | Odd Grenland | 30 | 14 | 6 | 10 | 44 | 44 | 0 | 48 | |
| 6 | Haugesund | 30 | 14 | 5 | 11 | 55 | 43 | +12 | 47 | |

Source: fotball.no
Rules for classification: 1) points; 2) goal difference; 3) number of goals scored.

=== Norwegian Cup ===
| 1 May 2011 Round 1 | Tertnes | 0–3 | Brann | Bergen |
| 18:00 | | Report | Mezquida 18', 56'; Austin 22' (pen.) | Stadium: Åstveit Idrettspark; Attendance: 2,500; Referee: Jon Ophuus |

| 11 May 2011 Round 2 | Fana | 2–3 | Brann | Fana |
| 18:00 | Engeset 23'; Dankertsen 42' | Report | Mjelde 77' (pen.); Ojo 89'; Bentley 90+2' | Stadium: Nesttun Kunstgress; Attendance: 1,200; Referee: Kai Erik Steen |

| 26 May 2011 Round 3 | Åsane | 0–1 | Brann | Åsane |
| 18:00 | | Report | Ojo 30' | Stadium: Myrdal Gress; Attendance: 1,204; Referee: Petter Kristiansen Toppe |

| 22 June 2011 Round 4 | Brann | 2–2 (a.e.t.) (3–2 p) | Sogndal | Bergen |
| 18:00 | Guastavino 89'; Bentley 116' | Report | Hovland 35'; Halvorsen 102' (pen.) | Stadium: Brann Stadion; Attendance: 11,503; Referee: Dag Vidar Hafsås |
| | Penalties |
| | Mjelde (penalty scored); Guastavino (penalty missed); Bentley (penalty missed); Grorud (penalty scored); Ojo (penalty scored) | | (penalty missed) Solheim; (penalty scored) Halvorsen; (penalty missed) Flo; (penalty missed) Kader; (penalty scored) Hovland |

| 14 August 2011 Quarter Final | Viking | 1–1 (a.e.t.) (1–3 p) | Brann | Stavanger |
| 19:45 | Sigurðsson 65' | Report | Haugen 74' | Stadium: Viking Stadion; Attendance: 9,086; Referee: Tommy Skjerven |
| | Penalties |
| | Sigurðsson (penalty scored); Val. Berisha (penalty missed); Nisja (penalty missed); Bertelsen (penalty missed) | | (penalty scored) Haugen; (penalty scored) Ojo; (penalty scored) Labukas |

| 21 September 2011 Semi Final | Fredrikstad | 0–2 | Brann | Fredrikstad |
| 19:00 | | Report | Guastavino 71'; Ojo 85' | Stadium: Fredrikstad Stadion; Attendance: 12,068; Referee: Brage Sandmoen |

| 6 November 2011 Final | Brann | 1–2 | Aalesund | Oslo |
| 13:15 | Korcsmár 21' | Report | Barrantes 19', 38' | Stadium: Ullevaal Stadion; Attendance: 25,032; Referee: Svein-Erik Edvartsen |
