= 2011 Norwegian Football Cup final =

- Event: 2011 Norwegian Football Cup
Brann	Aalesund
1	2
- Date: 6 November 2011
- Venue: Ullevaal Stadion, Oslo
- Man of the Match: Michael Barrantes
- Referee: Svein-Erik Edvartsen
- Attendance: 25,032

The 2011 Norwegian Football Cup final was the 106th final of the Norwegian Football Cup. It was played on 6 November 2011 at Ullevaal Stadion, in Oslo, Norway. In the final Brann meet Aalesund. The winner, Aalesund, earned a place in the second qualifying round of the 2012–13 UEFA Europa League. The draw for the final was held on 27 September 2011 by the Norwegian Football Association, which decided that Brann was the home team of the final and got to play in their red home kits. UEFA-president Michel Platini came to Oslo and watched the final.

== Background ==
Up to the 2011 final, Brann had reached the Cup Final fourteen times, winning six of them, while Aalesund had won the only Final they played in 2009. The first league match of the Tippeliga-season, ended 1–1 at Brann Stadion. The second league match will be played after the Final. In the last ten years, Brann and Aalesund had been drawn together in the Norwegian Cup twice, each winning one tie; in the Fifth Round in 2002, Aalesund, who played on the second-tier that year, won the penalty shootout 6-5 after 120 minutes with 0–0 at Brann Stadion; Aalesund went on to reach the semi-final. Their next meeting was 3 years later, in the Fourth Round of the 2005 competition; Brann won the match 3-2 but were eliminated in the quarter-final.

== Pre-match ==
=== Officials ===
Hamar-based referee Svein-Erik Edvartsen was named as the referee for the 2011 Cup Final on 10 October 2011. Edvartsen states that this will be his biggest experience as a referee. Edvartsen has no previous assignments as the primary referee at Ullevaal Stadion, but have been a FIFA-elected referee between 2007 and 2008 and have since 2005 refereed 95 Tippeliga-matches.

His assistants for the 2011 final was Odd-Jarle Hansen, representing Fløy, Magnus Lundberg from Ringsaker, with Brevik Fotball's Anders Johansen as the fourth official.

== Route to the final ==
Brann		Round	Aalesund	
Tertnes (D3); A 3–0	Mezquida 18', 56', Austin 22'	First round	Stranda (D3); A 8–0	Okoronkwo 29', Sylling Olsen 35', 39', 72', Barrantes 71', 87', Myklebust 90+1', Sellin 90+3'
Fana (D3); A 3–2	Mjelde 77', Ojo 88', Bentley 90+2'	Second round	Tornado Måløy (D3); A 5–0	Okoronkwo 12', Post 20', Fuhre 35', Ulvestad 86', Sellin 90'
Åsane (D2); A 1–0	Ojo 80'	Third round	Hødd (D1); A 2–1 aet	Arnefjord 90+5', Barrantes 120'
Sogndal (TL); H 2–2 (3–2 p)	Guastavino 89', Bentley 116'	Fourth round	Sarpsborg 08 (TL); H 3–0	Ulvestad 59', Arnefjord 62', Barrantes 84'
Viking (TL); A 1–1 (3–1 p)	Haugen 73'	Quarter-final	Rosenborg (TL); H 3–1	Wangberg 26' (o.g.), Barrantes 56', Phillips 75'
Fredrikstad (TL); A 2–0	Guastavino 71', Ojo 85'	Semi-final	Start (TL); H 5–0	Guðmundsson 40' (o.g.)

- (TL) = Tippeligaen team
- (D1) = 1. divisjon team
- (D2) = 2. divisjon team
- (D3) = 3. divisjon team

== Pre-match ==
=== Tickets ===
The two clubs received 13,000 of the 25,500 tickets to the Final. Since Brann have a higher average home attendance then Aalesund, they get 7,032 tickets while Aalesund gets 5,968 tickets. 2,500 tickets were available for all through sale, while the remaining 10,000 tickets went to partners of the Norwegian Football Association.

== Match ==
6 November 2011
13:15 CET (UTC+1)

Brann	1–2	Aalesund
Korcsmár 21'	Report	Barrantes 19', 38'

Ullevaal Stadion, Oslo
Attendance: 25,032
Referee: Svein-Erik Edvartsen (Hamar IL)

Brann	Aalesund

BRANN:
GK	24	(Poland) Piotr Leciejewski
RB	2	(Iceland) Birkir Már Sævarsson	(yellow card) 61'
CB	4	(Norway) Lars Grorud
CB	21	(Hungary) Zsolt Korcsmar
LB	7	(Norway) Hassan El Fakiri
CM	5	(Jamaica) Rudolph Austin
CM	18	(Uruguay) Maximiliano Bajter	(yellow card) 45'	(substituted off) 86'
CM	15	(Uruguay) Diego Guastavino
RW	10	(Norway) Erik Mjelde (c)
CF	9	(Nigeria) Kim Ojo
LW	26	(Norway) Bjørnar Holmvik	(yellow card) 40'	(substituted off) 70'
Substitutes:
GK	12	(Norway) Håkon Opdal
MF	8	(Norway) Fredrik Haugen	(yellow card) 73'	(substituted on) 70'
FW	11	(Nigeria) Bentley
MF	16	(Norway) Bjarte Haugsdal
FW	19	(Lithuania) Tadas Labukas		(substituted on) 86'
DF	25	(Norway) Yaw Ihle Amankwah
FW	30	(Norway) Kristoffer Larsen
Head Coach:
(Norway) Rune Skarsfjord

AALESUND:
GK	13	(Norway) Sten Grytebust
RB	16	(Estonia) Enar Jääger
CB	4	(Norway) Jonatan Tollås Nation
CB	15	(Sweden) Daniel Arnefjord (c)
LB	22	(Norway) Jo Nymo Matland
RM	23	(Norway) Fredrik Ulvestad
CM	7	(Jamaica) Jason Morrison	(yellow card) 45'
CM	6	(Norway) Magnus Sylling Olsen		(substituted off) 90'
LM	31	(Costa Rica) Michael Barrantes		(substituted off) 87'
SS	17	(Jamaica) Demar Phillips
CF	3	(Norway) Edvard Skagestad		(substituted off) 74'
Substitutes:
GK	35	(Sweden) Jonas Sandqvist
DF	5	(Finland) Ville Jalasto		(substituted on) 87'
FW	9	(Estonia) Sander Post		(substituted on) 90'
MF	10	(Norway) Peter Orry Larsen		(substituted on) 74'
FW	18	(Norway) Christian Myklebust
FW	19	(Norway) Kjell Rune Sellin
MF	25	(Norway) Lars Fuhre
Head Coach:
(Norway) Kjetil Rekdal

MATCH OFFICIALS

- Assistant referees:
  - Odd Jarle Larsen (Fløy Fotball)
  - Magnus Lundberg (Ringsaker IF)
- Fourth official: Anders Johansen (Brevik IL)

MATCH RULES

- 90 minutes.
- 30 minutes of extra-time if necessary.
- Penalty shoot-out if scores still level.
- Seven named substitutes.
- Maximum of three substitutions.

== See also ==
- 2011 Norwegian Football Cup
- 2011 Tippeligaen
- 2011 in Norwegian football
