= 2012 SK Brann season =

Brann
2012 season
- Chairman: Lars Moldestad
- Head coach: Rune Skarsfjord
- Stadium: Nadderud Stadion
- Tippeligaen: 6th
- Norwegian Cup: Semi-finals vs IL Hødd
- Top goalscorer: League: Kim Ojo (11); All: Kim Ojo (15)
- Highest home attendance: 17,200 vs Sogndal; 16 May 2012
- Lowest home attendance: 7,751 vs Strømsgodset (NC)19 August 2012
- Average home league attendance: 12,150; 8 November 2012

The 2012 season was Brann's 26th consecutive year in Tippeligaen, It was Rune Skarsfjord's second full season as the club's manager. Brann competed in the Tippeligaen, finishing 6th, and the 2012 Norwegian Football Cup where they were knocked out by eventual winners IL Hødd at the semi-final stage .

== Squad ==
As of 31 August 2012

Note: Flags indicate national team as defined under FIFA eligibility rules; some limited exceptions apply. Players may hold more than one non-FIFA nationality.

No.	Pos.	Nation	Player
1	GK	NOR	Jørgen Mohus
2	DF	ISL	Birkir Sævarsson
3	DF	NOR	Christian Kalvenes
4	DF	NOR	Simen Wangberg
7	MF	NOR	Hassan El Fakiri
8	MF	NOR	Fredrik Haugen
9	FW	NGA	Kim Ojo
10	MF	NOR	Erik Mjelde
11	FW	NGA	Bentley
12	GK	NOR	Øystein Øvretveit
13	FW	NOR	Erik Huseklepp

No.	Pos.	Nation	Player
14	MF	NOR	Fredrik Nordkvelle
18	DF	SWE	Markus Jonsson (Captain)
19	FW	NOR	Kristoffer Larsen
21	DF	HUN	Zsolt Korcsmár
22	MF	NOR	Amin Askar
23	MF	NOR	Tomasz Sokolowski
24	GK	POL	Piotr Leciejewski
27	DF	SWE	Erdin Demir
28	FW	NOR	Bård Finne
29	MF	NOR	Kristoffer Barmen
30	DF	NOR	Jonas Grønner

== Transfers ==
=== Winter ===
In: Note: Flags indicate national team as defined under FIFA eligibility rules; some limited exceptions apply. Players may hold more than one non-FIFA nationality.

No.	Pos.	Nation	Player
14	MF	NOR	Fredrik Nordkvelle (from (Norway) Strømsgodset)
17	FW	SEN	Oumar Niasse (from (Senegal) US Ouakam)
18	DF	SWE	Markus Jonsson (from (Greece) Panionios)
22	MF	NOR	Amin Askar (from (Norway) Fredrikstad)
23	MF	NOR	Tomasz Sokolowski (from (Norway) Viking)
27	DF	SWE	Erdin Demir (from (Sweden) Trelleborg)
33	GK	ISL	Hannes Þór Halldórsson (loan from (Iceland) KR)

Out: Note: Flags indicate national team as defined under FIFA eligibility rules; some limited exceptions apply. Players may hold more than one non-FIFA nationality.

No.	Pos.	Nation	Player
—	DF	NOR	Yaw Amankwah (to (Norway) Sandefjord)
—	MF	NOR	Bjørnar Holmvik (to (Norway) Sandnes Ulf)
—	FW	NOR	Bjarte Haugsdal (to (Norway) Stabæk)
—	MF	URU	Maximiliano Bajter (to (Uruguay) C.A Fenix)
—	FW	LTU	Tadas Labukas (to (Latvia) Skonto Riga)
—	FW	URU	Diego Guastavino (to (Mexico) Querétaro)
33	GK	ISL	Hannes Þór Halldórsson (loan return to (Iceland) KR)

=== Summer ===
In: Note: Flags indicate national team as defined under FIFA eligibility rules; some limited exceptions apply. Players may hold more than one non-FIFA nationality.

No.	Pos.	Nation	Player
4	DF	NOR	Simen Wangberg (from (Norway) Rosenborg)
13	FW	NOR	Erik Huseklepp (from (England) Portsmouth)

Out: Note: Flags indicate national team as defined under FIFA eligibility rules; some limited exceptions apply. Players may hold more than one non-FIFA nationality.

No.	Pos.	Nation	Player
4	DF	NOR	Lars Grorud (to (Norway) Fredrikstad)
5	MF	JAM	Rodolph Austin (to (England) Leeds United)
17	FW	SEN	Oumar Niasse (loan return to (Senegal) US Ouakam)

== Competitions ==
=== Tippeligaen ===
==== Results summary ====
Overall								Home						Away					
Pld	W	D	L	GF	GA	GD	Pts	W	D	L	GF	GA	GD	W	D	L	GF	GA	GD
30	13	3	14	57	50	+7	42	10	1	4	36	20	+16	3	2	10	21	30	−9

==== Results by round ====
Round	1	2	3	4	5	6	7	8	9	10	11	12	13	14	15	16	17	18	19	20	21	22	23	24	25	26	27	28	29	30
Ground	A	H	A	H	A	H	H	A	H	A	H	A	H	A	H	H	A	A	H	A	H	A	H	A	H	A	H	A	H	A
Result	L	W	L	L	L	L	D	W	W	L	W	L	W	L	W	W	D	W	W	L	W	D	W	L	W	W	L	L	L	L
Position	15	7	12	12	14	14	14	13	12	13	11	11	8	10	9	8	9	7	5	7	5	5	4	6	5	5	6	6	6	6

Updated to match(es) played on 29 October 2012. Source: see below
A = Away; H = Home; W = Win; D = Draw; L = Loss

==== Results ====
25 March 2012 1	Rosenborg	3–1	Brann	Trondheim
20:00	Iversen 9'; Larsen 54'; Prica 81' (yellow card) 85'	Report	Nordkvelle (yellow card) 13'; Austin (yellow card) 48'; Askar 60'; Grorud (yellow card) 80'	Stadium: Lerkendal Stadion; Attendance: 13,166; Referee: Tom Hagen

30 March 2012 2	Brann	3–1	Sandnes Ulf	Bergen
19:00	Austin 12' (pen.) (yellow card) 67'; Askar 60'; Ojo 62'	Report	Saaliti 20'; Raskaj (yellow card) 52'; Frejd (yellow card) 72'	Stadium: Brann Stadion; Attendance: 11,585; Referee: Kristoffer Helgerud

9 April 2012 3	Molde	2–1	Brann	Molde
20:00	Berget 9'; Ekpo (yellow card) 24'; Angan 52'	Report	Grorud (yellow card) 26'; Demir (yellow card) 60'; Askar (yellow card) 83' (goal) 90+5'; Sævarsson (yellow card) 90'; Kalvenes (yellow card) 90+3'	Stadium: Aker Stadion; Attendance: 8,771; Referee: Svein Edvartsen

15 April 2012 4	Brann	1–2	Strømsgodset	Bergen
18:00	Kalvenes (yellow card) 8'; Ojo (yellow card) 35'; Barmen 90+2'	Report	Kovács (yellow card) 32' (goal) 58'; Aas 41'	Stadium: Brann Stadion; Attendance: 12,940; Referee: Par Staberg

21 April 2012 5	Haugesund	2–1	Brann	Haugesund
18:00	Skjerve (yellow card) 24'; Søderlund 34'; Đurđić 34'	Report	El Fakiri (yellow card) 29'; Ojo 41'; Mjelde (yellow card) 73'	Stadium: Haugesund Stadion; Attendance: 5,000; Referee: Ken Henry Johnsen

29 April 2012 6	Brann	1–2	Vålerenga	Bergen
19:00	Haugen (yellow card) 16'; Ojo 22'; Demir (yellow card) 24'; Korcsmár (yellow card) 40'; Grorud (red card) 48'	Report	Simon Larsen (yellow card) 19'; Leigh (yellow card) 37'; Pedersen 41'; Zajić 45+3' (pen.); Ahmed Suleiman (yellow card) 87'	Stadium: Brann Stadion; Attendance: 12,502; Referee: Kristoffer Helgerud

7 May 2012 7	Brann	0–0	Viking	Bergen
19:00	Mjelde (yellow card) 62'	Report	Skogseid (yellow card) 68'	Stadium: Brann Stadion; Attendance: 10,418; Referee: Tommy Skjerven

13 May 2012 8	Lillestrøm	3–4	Brann	Lillestrøm
20:00	Sigurðarson 41' (pen.), 43', 51' (yellow card) 66'; Ringstad (yellow card) 64'	Report	Bentley 9', 32', 44'; Mjelde 49'	Stadium: Åråsen Stadion; Attendance: 5,885; Referee: Brage Sandmoen

16 May 2012 9	Brann	5–0	Sogndal	Bergen
20:00	Bentley 52'; Mjelde 57'; Ojo 60'; Barmen 63'; Askar 90+1'	Report		Stadium: Brann Stadion; Attendance: 17,200; Referee: Svein Oddvar Moen

20 May 2012 10	Aalesund	2–0	Brann	Ålesund
18:00	Barrantes 17' (yellow card) 43'; Post 46'	Report	Askar (yellow card) 44'; Austin (yellow card) 41' (yellow-red card) 68'	Stadium: Color Line Stadion; Attendance: 9,709; Referee: Tom Hagen

23 May 2012 11	Brann	2–0	Fredrikstad	Bergen
19:00	Bentley 74'; Sævarsson 82'	Report	Landgren (yellow card) 42'	Stadium: Brann Stadion; Attendance: 10,750; Referee: Tommy Skjerven

28 May 2012 12	Tromsø	2–0	Brann	Tromsø
19:00	Ondrášek 13', 65'; Årst (yellow card) 87'	Report	Bentley (yellow card) 27'	Stadium: Alfheim Stadion; Attendance: 4,017; Referee: Dag Hafsås

30 June 2012 13	Brann	2–1	Stabæk	Bergen
16:00	Austin 4' (pen.); Ojo 18'; Mjelde (yellow card) 63'	Report	Kleiven 60'	Stadium: Brann Stadion; Attendance: 12,346; Referee: Par Staberg

7 July 2012 14	Hønefoss	2–1	Brann	Hønefoss
18:00	Bolseth (yellow card) 38'; Mendy 55'; Riski 58'; Larsen (yellow card) 89'	Report	Sokolowski 19'; Demir (yellow card) 54'; Austin (yellow card) 61'; Korcsmár (yellow card) 90+1'	Stadium: Aka Arena; Attendance: 2,364; Referee: Anders Johansen

15 July 2012 15	Brann	6–2	Odd Grenland	Bergen
18:00	Jonsson 28'; Korcsmár 50', 67'; Sokolowski 64'; Austin 83'; Ojo 90+3'	Report	Semb Berge 41'; Andersson 62'	Stadium: Brann Stadion; Attendance: 10,945; Referee: Svein Oddvar Moen

22 July 2012 16	Brann	2–1	Aalesund	Bergen
16:00	Austin (yellow card) 20' (goal) 35'; Bentley 88'	Report	Phillips (yellow card) 75'; Fuhre 84'	Stadium: Brann Stadion; Attendance: 12,122; Referee: Brage Sandmoen

30 July 2012 17	Vålerenga	1–1	Brann	Oslo
19:00	Pedersen 62'	Report	Askar 33'; Nordkvelle (yellow card) 40'	Stadium: Ullevaal Stadion; Attendance: 16,687; Referee: Svein Edvartsen

6 August 2012 18	Stabæk	0–4	Brann	Bærum
19:00	Boli (yellow card) 20'	Report	Bentley 36', 51'; Sævarsson 46'; Huseklepp 81'	Stadium: Nadderud Stadion; Attendance: 4,086; Referee: Espen Berntsen

11 August 2012 19	Brann	3–2	Haugesund	Bergen
18:00	Askar 39', 61'; Nordkvelle 59'; Haugen (yellow card) 86'	Report	Đurđić 67', 77'; Engblom (yellow card) 90+1'	Stadium: Brann Stadion; Attendance: 15,328; Referee: Par Staberg

24 August 2012 20	Odd Grenland	1–0	Brann	Skien
19:00	Hagen (yellow card) 45+2'; Shala 66'	Report	Korcsmár (yellow card) 67'; El Fakiri (yellow card) 69'; Sævarsson (yellow card) 83'; Mjelde (yellow card) 90+1'	Stadium: Skagerak Arena; Attendance: 5,525; Referee: Trond Døvle

2 September 2012 21	Brann	4–1	Molde	Bergen
19:00	Askar 47'; Wangberg 67'; Ojo 89', 90+1'	Report	Angan 27'	Stadium: Brann Stadion; Attendance: 12,179; Referee: Dag Hafsås

16 September 2012 22	Sandnes Ulf	3–3	Brann	Sandnes
18:00	Gytkjær 37', 56'; Torsteinbø 65'; Aanestad (yellow card) 68'	Report	Bentley 5'; Ojo 63', 82'	Stadium: Sandnes Idrettspark; Attendance: 3,824; Referee: Andreas Johansen

23 September 2012 23	Brann	2–1	Rosenborg	Bergen
19:00	Mjelde (yellow card) 30'; Ojo (yellow card) 62'; El Fakiri (yellow card) 83'; Finne 86', 89'	Report	Chibuike 55'	Stadium: Brann Stadion; Attendance: 14,802; Referee: Espen Berntsen

30 September 2012 24	Strømsgodset	2–0	Brann	Drammen
19:00	Vilsvik 55' (pen.); Kamara 73'	Report	Wangberg (yellow card) 24'; Haugen (yellow card) 35'	Stadium: Marienlyst Stadion; Attendance: 6,478; Referee: Svein Moan

8 October 2012 25	Brann	3–2	Hønefoss	Bergen
19:00	Nordkvelle 42'; Finne 87'; Larsen 90+3'	Report	Vendelbo 60'; Kevin Beugre 74'	Stadium: Brann Stadion; Attendance: 10,727; Referee: Trygve Kjensli

22 October 2012 26	Fredrikstad	3–4	Brann	Fredrikstad
19:00	Stene 3'; Pusic 27'; Halvorsen 48'	Report	Ojo 24'; Huseklepp 39' (pen.); Larsen 44'; Landgren 90+3' (o.g.)	Stadium: Fredrikstad Stadion; Attendance: 6,389; Referee: Tom Hagen

29 October 2012 27	Brann	2–3	Lillestrøm	Bergen
19:00	Huseklepp 12', 45+1' (pen.); Ojo (yellow card) 64'; Korcsmár (yellow card) 82'	Report	Bolly 7', 66'; Hauger (yellow card) 45'; Knudtzon (yellow card) 62'; Østli 83'	Stadium: Brann Stadion; Attendance: 10,648; Referee: Kristoffer Helgerud

4 November 2012 28	Viking	2–1	Brann	Stavanger
18:00	Nisja 2'; Ørnskov 61'	Report	Haugen (yellow card) 31'; Bjørdal 56' (o.g.); Korcsmár (yellow card) 59'	Stadium: Viking Stadion; Attendance: 10,322; Referee: Dag Vidar Hafsås

11 November 2012 29	Brann	0–2	Tromsø	Bergen
18:00		Report	Ondrášek 21', 78' (pen.)	Stadium: Brann Stadion; Attendance: 10,777; Referee: Svein Oddvar Moen

18 November 2012 30	Sogndal	2–0	Brann	Sogndalsfjøra
18:00	Flo 42'; Hopen 83'	Report		Stadium: Fosshaugane Campus; Attendance: 5,207; Referee: Espen Berntsen

==== Table ====
Pos	Team	Pld	W	D	L	GF	GA	GD	Pts	Qualification or relegation
4	Tromsø	30	14	7	9	45	32	+13	49	Qualification for the Europa League first qualifying round (Note: Tromsø qualified for the first qualifying round of the UEFA Europa League via the UEFA Fair Play ranking.)
5	Viking	30	14	7	9	41	36	+5	49	
6	Brann	30	13	3	14	57	50	+7	42	
7	Haugesund	30	11	9	10	46	40	+6	42	
8	Vålerenga	30	12	5	13	42	44	−2	41	

Source: fotball.no
Rules for classification: 1) points; 2) goal difference; 3) number of goals scored.

=== Norwegian Cup ===
1 May 2012 Round 1	Bjarg	1–2	Brann	Bergen
18:00 CEST (UTC+2)	E.Skåtun 30'	Report	Mjelde 44', 62'	Stadium: Stavollen Kunstgress; Attendance: 1,500; Referee: Jan Morten Tennøy

10 May 2012 Round 2	Florø	1–6	Brann	Florø
18:00 CEST (UTC+2)	S.Aase 77'	Report	Barmen 8'; Ojo 29', 45'; Sævarsson 44', 90+2'; Finne 72'	Stadium: Florø Stadion; Attendance: 3,100; Referee: Steinar Hauge

20 June 2012 Round 3	Nest-Sotra	0–3	Brann	Ågotnes
18:00 CEST (UTC+2)		Report	Sokolowski 15'; Ojo 20'; Demir (yellow card) 33'; Korcsmár 89'	Stadium: Ågotnes Stadion; Attendance: 1,400; Referee: Kjetil Sælen

4 July 2012 Round 4	Viking	2–3 (a.e.t.)	Brann	Stavanger
18:00 CEST (UTC+2)	Berisha 60' (yellow card) 60' de Lanlay 68'; Sigurðsson (yellow card) 120'	Report	Mjelde 55'; Korcsmár 90'; Ojo 113'; Leciejewski (yellow card) 120'	Stadium: Viking Stadion; Attendance: 3,517; Referee: Svein Edvartsen

19 August 2012 Quarter Final	Brann	4–3	Strømsgodset	Bergen
20:00 CEST (UTC+2)	Jonsson 44'; Nordkvelle 67'; Bentley 71'; Huseklepp 86' (pen.)	Report	Kovács 22'; Ibrahim (yellow card) 43' (yellow-red card) 60'; Storflor 58'; Kwarasey (yellow card) 69'; Diomande 90+3'	Stadium: Brann Stadion; Attendance: 7,751; Referee: Svein Moen

27 September 2012 Semi Final	Hødd	3–1	Brann	Ulsteinvik
16:00 CEST (UTC+2)	Aursnes 40'; Helland 66'; Sellin 81'	Report	Korcsmár 17'	Stadium: Høddvoll Stadion; Attendance: 6,261; Referee: Svein Erik Edvartsen

== Squad statistics ==
=== Appearances and goals ===
No.	Pos	Nat	Player	Total		Tippeligaen		Norwegian Football Cup	
No.	Pos	Nat	Player	Apps	Goals	Apps	Goals	Apps	Goals
1	GK	(Norway) NOR	Jørgen Mohus	3	0	3+0	0	0+0	0
2	DF	(Iceland) ISL	Birkir Sævarsson	35	4	30+0	2	4+1	2
3	DF	(Norway) NOR	Christian Kalvenes	9	0	5+2	0	2+0	0
4	DF	(Norway) NOR	Simen Wangberg	11	1	10+0	1	0+1	0
7	MF	(Norway) NOR	Hassan El Fakiri	15	0	9+2	0	3+1	0
8	MF	(Norway) NOR	Fredrik Haugen	28	0	16+9	0	1+2	0
9	FW	(Nigeria) NGA	Kim Ojo	34	15	29+0	11	5+0	4
10	MF	(Norway) NOR	Erik Mjelde	30	5	18+7	2	5+0	3
11	FW	(Nigeria) NGA	Bentley	34	9	20+9	9	4+1	0
12	GK	(Norway) NOR	Øystein Øvretveit	5	0	3+2	0	0+0	0
13	FW	(Norway) NOR	Erik Huseklepp	14	5	11+1	4	2+0	1
14	MF	(Norway) NOR	Fredrik Nordkvelle	28	3	15+9	2	2+2	1
15	MF	(Norway) NOR	Eirik Birkelund	4	0	0+3	0	0+1	0
16	DF	(Norway) NOR	Fredrik Heggeland	0	0	0+0	0	0+0	0
18	DF	(Sweden) SWE	Markus Jonsson	21	1	16+1	1	4+0	0
19	FW	(Norway) NOR	Kristoffer Larsen	26	2	15+6	2	3+2	0
20	MF	(Norway) NOR	Kjetil Kalve	1	0	0+1	0	0+0	0
21	DF	(Hungary) HUN	Zsolt Korcsmár	31	5	26+0	2	4+1	3
22	MF	(Norway) NOR	Amin Askar	27	8	22+1	8	4+0	0
23	MF	(Norway) NOR	Tomasz Sokolowski	16	2	13+0	2	2+1	0
24	GK	(Poland) POL	Piotr Leciejewski	28	0	23+0	0	5+0	0
26	FW	(Norway) NOR	Kasper Skaanes	2	0	0+1	0	0+1	0
27	DF	(Sweden) SWE	Erdin Demir	27	0	20+2	0	5+0	0
28	FW	(Norway) NOR	Bård Finne	9	3	1+6	3	0+2	0
29	MF	(Norway) NOR	Kristoffer Barmen	20	2	10+8	2	1+1	0
30	DF	(Norway) NOR	Jonas Grønner	7	0	2+3	0	2+0	0
	DF	(Norway) NOR	Andreas Vindheim	1	0	0+0	0	1+0	0
Players who appeared for Brann no longer at the club:
4	DF	(Norway) NOR	Lars Grorud	8	0	7+0	0	1+0	0
5	MF	(Jamaica) JAM	Rodolph Austin	16	4	12+0	4	4+0	0
17	MF	(Senegal) SEN	Oumar Niasse	4	0	0+3	0	1+0	0
33	GK	(Iceland) ISL	Hannes Þór Halldórsson	2	0	1+0	0	1+0	0

=== Goal scorers ===
Place	Position	Nation	Number	Name	Tippeligaen	Norwegian Football Cup	Total
1	FW	(Nigeria)	9	Kim Ojo	11	4	15
2	FW	(Nigeria)	11	Bentley	9	1	10
3	MF	(Norway)	22	Amin Askar	8	0	8
4	FW	(Norway)	13	Erik Huseklepp	4	1	5
4	MF	(Norway)	10	Erik Mjelde	2	3	5
4	DF	(Hungary)	21	Zsolt Korcsmár	2	3	5
7	DF	(Iceland)	2	Birkir Sævarsson	2	2	4
7	FW	(Norway)	28	Bård Finne	3	1	4
7	MF	(Jamaica)	5	Rodolph Austin	4	0	4
10	MF	(Norway)	29	Kristoffer Barmen	2	1	3
10	MF	(Norway)	23	Tomasz Sokolowski	2	1	3
10	MF	(Norway)	14	Fredrik Nordkvelle	2	1	3
13	DF	(Sweden)	18	Markus Jonsson	1	1	2
13	DF	(Norway)	4	Simen Wangberg	2	0	2
13				Own goal	2	0	2
16	FW	(Norway)	19	Kristoffer Larsen	1	0	1
				TOTALS	57	19	76

=== Disciplinary record ===
Number	Nation	Position	Name	Tippeligaen		Norwegian Cup		Total	
Number	Nation	Position	Name	Booked	Sent off (straight red)	Booked	Sent off (straight red)	Booked	Sent off (straight red)
2	(Iceland)	DF	Birkir Sævarsson	3	0	0	0	3	0
3	(Norway)	DF	Christian Kalvenes	2	0	0	0	2	0
4	(Norway)	DF	Lars Grorud	2	1	0	0	2	1
4	(Norway)	DF	Simen Wangberg	1	0	0	0	1	0
5	(Jamaica)	MF	Rodolph Austin	6	1	0	0	6	1
7	(Norway)	MF	Hassan El Fakiri	3	0	0	0	3	0
8	(Norway)	MF	Fredrik Haugen	4	0	0	0	4	0
9	(Nigeria)	FW	Kim Ojo	3	0	0	0	3	0
10	(Norway)	MF	Erik Mjelde	5	0	1	0	6	0
11	(Norway)	FW	Bentley	1	0	0	0	1	0
14	(Norway)	MF	Fredrik Nordkvelle	2	0	0	0	2	0
15	(Norway)	MF	Eirik Birkelund	0	0	1	0	1	0
18	(Sweden)	DF	Markus Jonsson	0	0	1	0	1	0
19	(Norway)	FW	Kristoffer Larsen	0	0	1	0	1	0
21	(Hungary)	DF	Zsolt Korcsmár	5	0	0	0	5	0
22	(Norway)	MF	Amin Askar	2	0	0	0	2	0
24	(Poland)	GK	Piotr Leciejewski	0	0	1	0	1	0
27	(Sweden)	DF	Erdin Demir	3	0	1	0	4	0
30	(Norway)	DF	Jonas Grønner	1	0	0	0	1	0
			TOTALS	44	2	6	0	50	2
