= 2011 Norwegian Football Cup =

Norgesmesterskapet i fotball for herrer

Tournament details
- Country: Norway
- Teams: 275 (overall); 128 (main competition)

Final positions
- Champions: Aalesund (2nd title)
- Runners-up: Brann

Tournament statistics
- Matches played: 127
- Goals scored: 483 (3.8 per match)
- Top goal scorer(s): Daniel Chima Chukwu (7 goals)

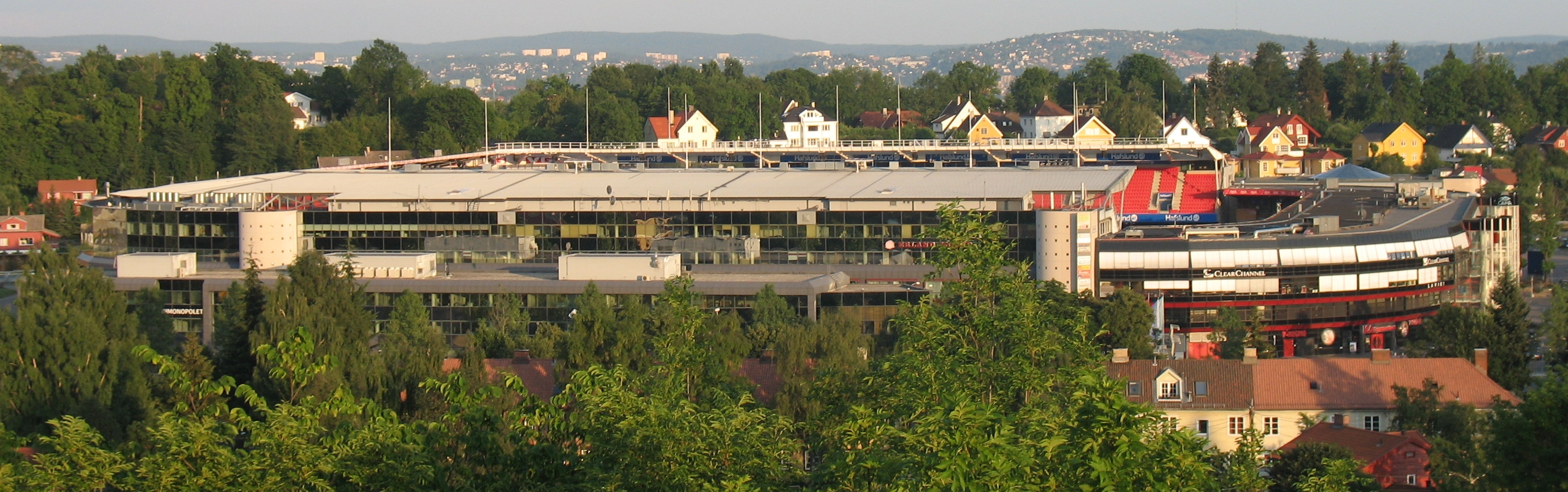
Ullevaal Stadion, Oslo - venue for the Norwegian Cup final

The 2011 Norwegian Football Cup was the 106th edition of the Norwegian annual knockout football tournament. It began on 6 April 2011 with the matches of the first qualifying round and ended on 6 November 2011 with the final. The winners, Aalesund, earned a place in the second qualifying round of the 2012–13 UEFA Europa League.

== Calendar ==
Below are the dates for each round as given by the official schedule:

Round	Main date	Number of fixtures	Clubs
First Qualifying Round	6 April 2011	98	275 → 177
Second Qualifying Round	13 April 2011	49	177 → 128
First Round	1 May 2011	64	128 → 64
Second Round	11 May 2011	32	64 → 32
Third Round	25 May 2011	16	32 → 16
Fourth Round	25 June 2011	8	16 → 8
Quarter-finals	13–14 August 2011	4	8 → 4
Semi-finals	20–22 September 2011	2	4 → 2
Final	6 November 2011	1	2 → 1

== First round ==
The 49 winners from the second qualifying round joined with 79 clubs from the Tippeligaen, First Division and Second Division in this round of the competition.

Team 1	Score	Team 2
30 April 2011
Brodd	0–1	Sandnes Ulf
1 May 2011
Brumunddal	2–3	KFUM
Byåsen	2–1	Mo
Sprint-Jeløy	0–1	Sarpsborg 08
Nesodden	2–0	Follo
Holmlia	0–1	Stabæk
Oldenborg	1–12	Vålerenga
Hasle-Løren	4–2	Moss
Korsvoll	0–6	Fredrikstad
Ullern	0–2	Asker
Bærum	5–1	Ull/Kisa
Fjellhamar	0–10	Kongsvinger
FuVo	0–3	Lillestrøm
Skedsmo	1–3	Strømmen
Lørenskog	1–0	Lillehammer
Elverum	1–2	Kjelsås
Ottestad	0–1 (a.e.t.)	Nybergsund
Moelven	0–3	HamKam
Gjøvik	3–1	Frigg
Valdres	1–3	Skeid
Birkebeineren	3–2 (a.e.t.)	Raufoss
Drammen	1–5	Hønefoss
Kongsberg	0–8	Strømsgodset
Ørn-Horten	4–4 (4–3 p)	Pors Grenland
Husøy & Foynland	0–5	Sandefjord
Eik-Tønsberg	1–4	Odd Grenland
Notodden	3–1	Jevnaker
Urædd	1–7	Mjøndalen
Skarphedin	2–3	FK Tønsberg
Flekkerøy IL	5–0	Fram Larvik
Søgne	2–3	Vindbjart
Egersunds	0–4	Viking
Ålgård	1–2 (a.e.t.)	Mandalskameratene
Arendal	2–5	Start
Vidar	2–1 (a.e.t.)	Kopervik
Staal Jørpeland	2–1	Bryne
Vard Haugesund	0–2	Randaberg
Stord	1–3	Åsane
Vadmyra	1–3	Løv-Ham
Tertnes	0–3	Brann
Fana	3–1	Austevoll
Bjarg	4–0	Nest-Sotra
Fyllingen	2–1	Førde
Saga	2–6	Sogndal
Tornado Måløy	4–0	Herd
Stranda	0–8	Aalesund
Volda	1–4	Hødd
Træff	4–1	Bergsøy
Eidsvåg	0–11	Molde
KIL/Hemne	0–1	Kristiansund
Alvdal	0–7	Rosenborg
Kattem	0–4	Ranheim
Charlottenlund	0–4	Tiller
Stjørdals-Blink	2–1	Strindheim
Verdal	3–0	Nardo
Steinkjer	1–2 (a.e.t.)	Levanger
Sortland	0–4	Bodø/Glimt
Harstad	0–2	Alta
Finnsnes	3–6	Tromsø
Fløya	0–1	Skarp
Senja	3–2	Mjølner
Hammerfest	1–9	Tromsdalen
Vaulen	0–10	Haugesund
2 May 2011
Drøbak/Frogn	0–1	Kvik Halden

== Second round ==
The 64 winners from the first round took part in this stage of the competition. These matches took place on 11 and 12 May 2011.

Team 1	Score	Team 2
11 May 2011
Kvik Halden	1–2	Sandefjord
Nesodden	0–3	Fredrikstad
KFUM	0–2	Hønefoss
Hasle-Løren	1–2	Stabæk
Kjelsås	2–1	Vålerenga
Bærum	2–3	Sarpsborg 08
Strømmen	0–1	Notodden
Nybergsund	3–5 (a.e.t.)	Lørenskog
Gjøvik	0–2	Lillestrøm
Birkebeineren	1–2	Strømsgodset
FK Tønsberg	0–2	Mjøndalen
Mandalskameratene	0–2	Odd Grenland
Vindbjart	3–4	Start
Randaberg	3–1	Flekkerøy IL
Sandnes Ulf	2–0	Vidar
Fana	2–3	Brann
Bjarg	0–3	Haugesund
Åsane	1–1 (9–8 p)	Løv-Ham
Tornado Måløy	0–5	Aalesund
Træff	0–2	Molde
Stjørdals-Blink	2–3	Ranheim
Verdal	0–5	Rosenborg
Levanger	1–1 (3–4 p)	Tiller
Bodø/Glimt	6–1	Skarp
Senja	0–3	Tromsø
Alta	3–0	Tromsdalen
12 May 2011
Skeid	3–4	Kongsvinger
Asker	4–2	Ørn-Horten
HamKam	1–3	Byåsen
Kristiansund	0–2	Hødd
Fyllingen	0–2	Sogndal
Staal Jørpeland	0–3	Viking

== Third round ==
The 32 winners from the second round took part in this stage of the competition. These matches took place on 25 and 26 May 2011.

Team 1	Score	Team 2
25 May 2011
Byåsen	3–6 (a.e.t.)	Rosenborg
Hødd	1–2 (a.e.t.)	Aalesund
Hønefoss	3–1	Stabæk
Kjelsås	1–2	Sarpsborg 08
Lillestrøm	0–0 (5–4 p)	Sandefjord
Lørenskog	0–4	Fredrikstad
Mjøndalen	1–2	Strømsgodset
Notodden	1–2	Start
Randaberg	3–5	Haugesund
Ranheim	0–0 (4–5 p)	Alta
Sogndal	2–0	Asker
Tiller	1–7	Molde
Tromsø	3–0	Bodø/Glimt
Viking	2–0	Sandnes
26 May 2011
Åsane	0–1	Brann
Kongsvinger	1–2 (a.e.t.)	Odd Grenland

== Fourth round ==
The 16 winners from the third round took part in this stage of the competition.

22 June 2011
18:00 CEST (UTC+2)

Haugesund	2–3 (a.e.t.)	Viking
Josè Bamberg 18'; Skogseid 23' (o.g.)	Report	Sæternes 45'; Nevland 89', 100'

Haugesund Stadion, Haugesund
Attendance: 4,342
Referee: Svein-Erik Edvartsen

22 June 2011
18:00 CEST (UTC+2)

Alta	1–0	Tromsø
Vasilev 27'	Report

Finnmarkshallen, Alta
Attendance: 1,300
Referee: Kristoffer Helgerud

22 June 2011
18:00 CEST (UTC+2)

Aalesund	3–0	Sarpsborg 08
F. Ulvestad 59'; Arnefjord 62'; Barrantes 84'	Report

Color Line Stadion, Ålesund
Attendance: 3,415
Referee: Brage Sandmoen

22 June 2011
18:00 CEST (UTC+2)

Odd Grenland	1–2	Fredrikstad
Samuelsen 12'	Report	Martinsen 51'; Borges 59'

Skagerak Arena, Skien
Attendance: 3,582
Referee: Per Ivar Staberg

22 June 2011
18:00 CEST (UTC+2)

Start	1–0	Strømsgodset
Hoff 37'	Report

Sør Arena, Kristiansand
Attendance: 1,957
Referee: Kjetil Sælen

22 June 2011
18:00 CEST (UTC+2)

Brann	2–2 (a.e.t.)	Sogndal
Guastavino 89'; Bentley 116'	Report	Hovland 36'; Halvorsen 102'
Penalties
Mjelde (penalty scored); Guastavino (penalty missed); Bentley (penalty missed); Grorud (penalty scored); Ojo (penalty scored)	3–2	(penalty missed) Solheim; (penalty scored) Halvorsen; (penalty missed) Flo; (penalty missed) Kader; (penalty scored) Hovland

Brann Stadion, Bergen
Attendance: 3,750
Referee: Dag Vidar Hafsås

22 June 2011
18:00 CEST (UTC+2)

Molde	3–1	Hønefoss
Diouf 72', 77', 85'	Report	Jensen 1'

Aker Stadion, Molde
Attendance: 2,461
Referee: Trond Ivar Døvle

22 June 2011
19:35 CEST (UTC+2)

Rosenborg	2–2 (a.e.t.)	Lillestrøm
Dorsin 6'; Lustig 110'	Report	B. Sigurðarson 74', 102'
Penalties
Prica (penalty scored); Lustig (penalty scored); Olsen (penalty scored); Winsnes (penalty scored)	4–1	(penalty missed) Nosa; (penalty missed) Pedersen; (penalty scored) Ujah

Lerkendal Stadion, Trondheim
Attendance: 5,012
Referee: Tommy Skjerven

== Quarter-finals ==
The 8 winners from the fourth round took part in this stage of the competition.

13 August 2011
16:00 CEST (UTC+2)

Start	1–0	Alta
Mathisen 70'	Report

Sør Arena, Kristiansand
Attendance: 2,707
Referee: Dag Vidar Hafsås

13 August 2011
19:45 CEST (UTC+2)

Aalesund	3–1	Rosenborg
Wangberg 26' (o.g.); Barrantes 56'; Phillips 75'	Report	Dorsin 10'

Color Line Stadion, Ålesund
Attendance: 6,828
Referee: Tommy Skjerven

14 August 2011
16:00 CEST (UTC+2)

Fredrikstad	3–2 (a.e.t.)	Molde
Borges 15'; Askar 81'; Hussain 117'	Report	Eikrem 41'; Angan 45'

Fredrikstad Stadion, Fredrikstad
Attendance: 5,265
Referee: Kjetil Sælen

14 August 2011
19:45 CEST (UTC+2)

Viking	1–1 (a.e.t.)	Brann
Skogseid 65'	Report	Haugen 74'
Penalties
Sigurdsson (penalty scored); Berisha (penalty missed); Nisja (penalty missed); Bertelsen (penalty missed)	1–3	(penalty scored) Haugen; (penalty scored) Ojo; (penalty scored) Labukas

Viking Stadion, Stavanger
Attendance: 9,086
Referee: Kristoffer Helgerud

== Semi-finals ==
The draw for the semi-finals took place on 17 August 2011. The semi-finals took place on 21 and 22 September 2011.

21 September 2011
20:00 CEST (UTC+2)

Fredrikstad	0–2	Brann
	Report	Guastavino 71'; Ojo 85'

Fredrikstad Stadion, Fredrikstad
Attendance: 12,068
Referee: Brage Sandmoen

22 September 2011
20:00 CEST (UTC+2)

Aalesund	1–0	Start
Guðmundsson 40' (o.g.)	Report

Color Line Stadion, Ålesund
Attendance: 8,549
Referee: Tom Harald Hagen

== Final ==
The 2011 Norwegian Football Cup final was played on 6 November 2011 at the Ullevaal Stadion in Oslo. The draw for the final was held on 27 September 2011 by the Norwegian Football Association, which decided that Brann was the home team of the final and got to play in their red home kits.

6 November 2011
13:15 CET (UTC+1)

Brann	1–2	Aalesund
Korcsmár 21'	Report	Barrantes 19', 38'

Ullevaal Stadion, Oslo
Attendance: 25,032
Referee: Svein-Erik Edvartsen (Hamar IL)

== Notes ==
All fixtures, results and matchinfo have been retrieved from this page
