= Maximiliano Bajter =

Uruguayan footballer (born 1986)

Personal information
- Full name: Maximiliano Bajter Ugollini
- Date of birth: 1 March 1986 (age 40)
- Place of birth: Montevideo, Uruguay
- Height: 1.83 m (6 ft 0 in)
- Position: Midfielder

Team information
- Current team: Villa Teresa
- Number: 8

Senior career*
Years	Team	Apps	(Gls)
2006–2011	Peñarol	51	(4)
2010–2011	→ Fénix (loan)	24	(4)
2011	→ Brann (loan)	8	(0)
2012	Fénix	19	(0)
2013	Unión La Calera	32	(9)
2014–2015	Veracruz	8	(0)
2015	The Strongest	24	(6)
2015–2016	Unión La Calera	23	(2)
2016–2017	Deportivo Pereira	15	(0)
2017–2019	Liverpool	44	(4)
2019	Rangers	4	(0)
2020–	Villa Teresa	13	(0)
- * Club domestic league appearances and goals as of 19:27, 17 March 2021 (UTC)

Maximiliano 'Pipi' Bajter Ugollini (born 1 March 1986 in Montevideo) is a Uruguayan football player currently playing for Villa Teresa. He is also known as "Pipi", or "Pitón", nickname given to him by his former coach at Peñarol, Julio Ribas, since he consider Pipi "was not a proper nickname for a gladiator"

== Career ==
=== Uruguay ===
Bajter began his professional career at Montevideo-based club Peñarol where he played between 2006 and 2010, winning the Primera División in his last year. Despite being successful, in terms of trophies and personal performance, he was plagued with injuries in his later years at Peñarol. The club, therefore, allowed him to rebuild form at another Montevideo club Fénix on loan, where he played until early summer of 2011.

=== Norway ===
On 18 July 2011, Bajter arrived in Bergen where he signed a loan contract until the end of the 2011 Norwegian Premier League season with SK Brann. Uruguay-based Norwegian football agent Terje Liverød — who has previously been involved in several transfers of Uruguayan players to Europe, including Bajter's new Brann teammate Diego Guastavino — was the main driving force behind the transfer.

He made his debut for the Bergen club on 4 August 2011 in the Vestlandsderby against Viking after coming on for an injured Zsolt Korcsmár in the second half. At the end of the year, Brann had the option to make Bajter a permanent signing, but opted against doing so after Bajter's last game against Aalesund.

== Career statistics ==
Season	Club	Division	League		Cup		Total	
Season	Club	Division	Apps	Goals	Apps	Goals	Apps	Goals
2011	Brann	Tippeligaen	6	0	2	0	8	0
2011–12	Fénix	Primera División	8	0	0	0	8	0
2012–13	Fénix	Primera División	11	0	0	0	11	0
2013	La Calera	Primera División	15	5	2	0	17	5
2013–14	La Calera	Primera División	17	4	0	0	17	4
Career total			57	9	4	0	61	9

== Trivia ==
Bajter has a wife and a two-year-old daughter who both moved to Norway with him.

He signed his contract with Brann on 18 July, Jura de la Constitución de la República Oriental del Uruguay (Uruguay's constitution day). So, when he was offered 18 as his squad number, he said that "it felt completely natural."
