= Barry Kader =

Ivorian footballer

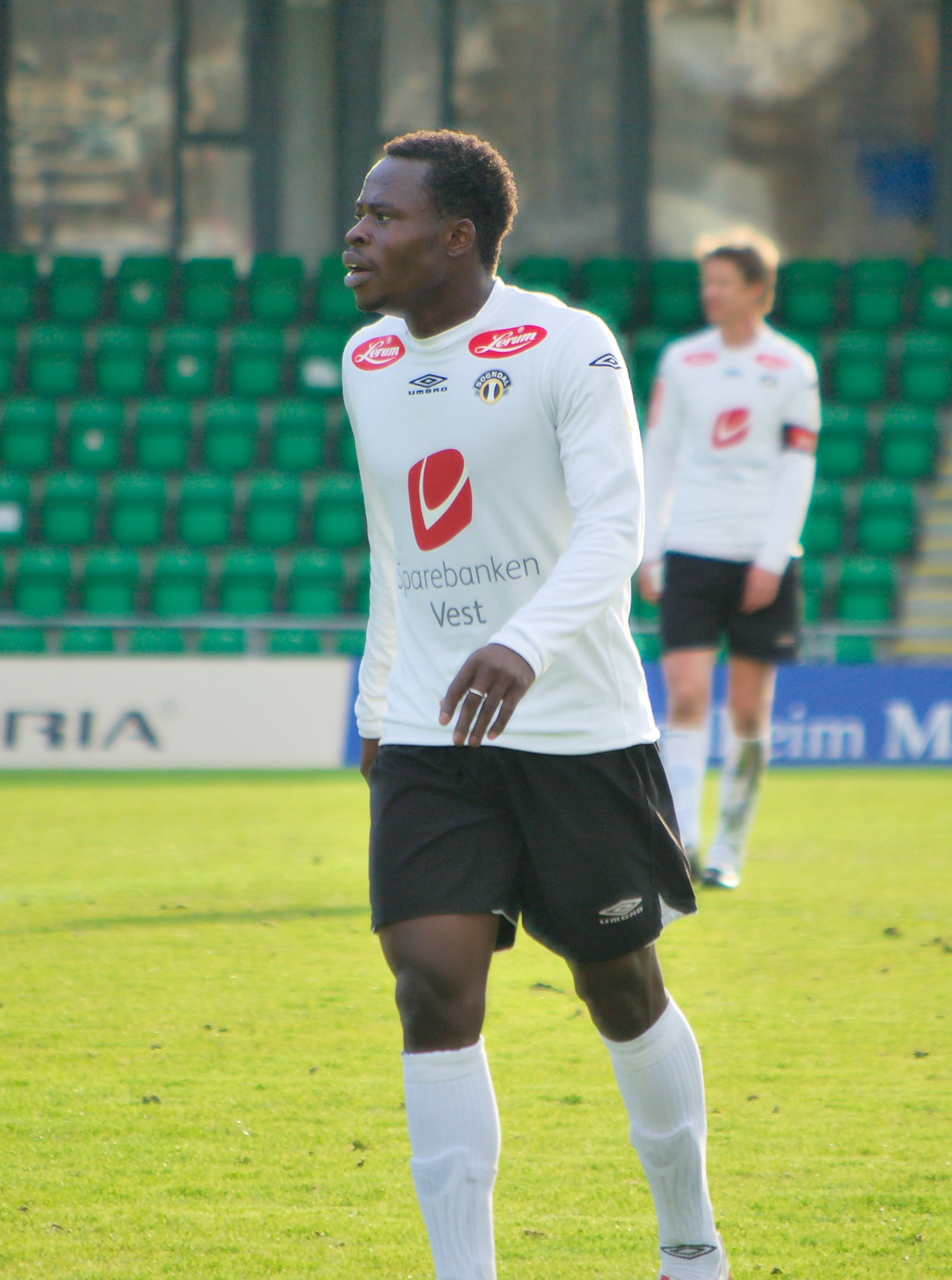

Personal information
- Full name: Souleymane Aonge Barry Kader
- Date of birth: 26 March 1986 (age 40)
- Place of birth: Abidjan, Ivory Coast
- Height: 1.75 m (5 ft 9 in)
- Position: Midfielder

Senior career*
Years	Team	Apps	(Gls)
2006–2011	Sogndal	87	(7)
2012	CS Turnu Severin	4	(0)
2013	Vard Haugesund	14	(1)
Total		105	(8)
- * Club domestic league appearances and goals

Souleymane Aonge Barry Kader (born 26 March 1986), known simply as Barry Kader, is an Ivorian former footballer who played as a midfielder.
