= Carl-Erik Torp =

Norwegian footballer (born 1984)

Personal information
- Full name: Carl-Erik Nordanger Torp
- Date of birth: 17 September 1984 (age 42)
- Place of birth: Kolbotn, Norway
- Height: 1.80 m (5 ft 11 in)
- Position: Central midfielder

Youth career
- Kolbotn

Senior career*
Years	Team	Apps	(Gls)
- Kolbotn
- KFUM Oslo
–2006	Manglerud Star	27	(2)
2007–2010	Kongsvinger	111	(12)
2011	Brann	23	(0)
- * Club domestic league appearances and goals as of 15 March 2012

Carl-Erik Nordanger Torp (born 17 September 1984) is a former Norwegian footballer who last played for SK Brann as a central midfielder. He also played futsal for NFF Futsal Eliteserie club KFUM Oslo Futsal. Torp was forced to retire from playing football in 2011 after suffering a cardiac arrest during a match.

== Club career ==
He played on football teams Kolbotn Fotball, KFUM Oslo and Manglerud Star before joining Kongsvinger ahead of the 2007 season. In 2010, he made his debut in the Norwegian Premier League.

On 11 November 2010 he signed a 3 years contract with Tippeliga club SK Brann on a free transfer because of his contract expiration with Kongsvinger on 31 December 2010.

=== Cardiac arrest during match ===
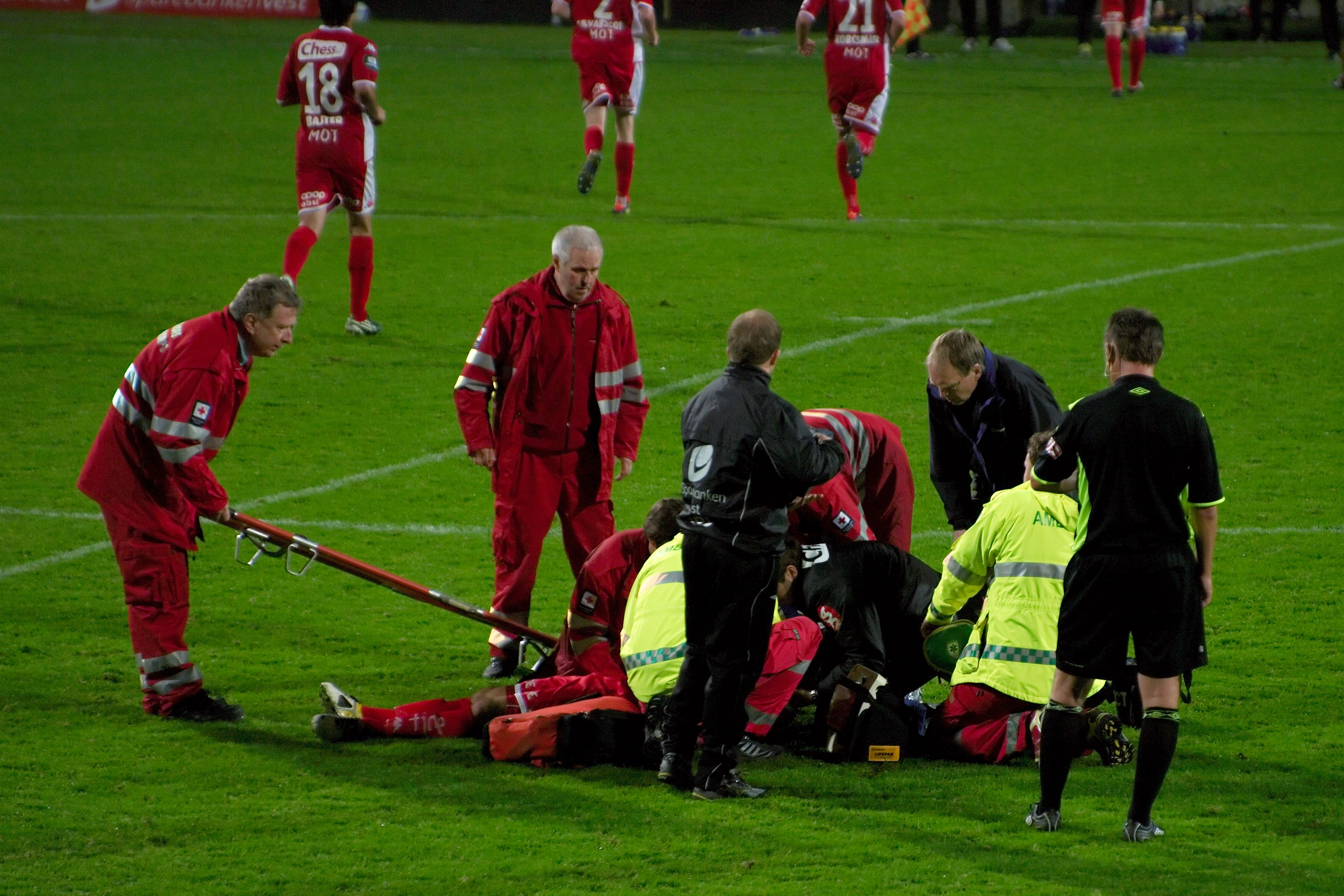

On 25 September 2011, Torp suffered cardiac arrest on the pitch after being substituted on in the 79th minute of a Norwegian National Championship game against Sogndal. A defibrillator and CPR was administered to stabilise his condition until he was air-lifted to a nearby hospital.

== Career statistics ==
Season	Club	Division	League		Cup		Total	
Season	Club	Division	Apps	Goals	Apps	Goals	Apps	Goals
2006	Manglerud Star	Adeccoligaen	27	2	1	1	28	3
2007	Kongsvinger	Adeccoligaen	29	3	0	0	29	3
2008	Kongsvinger	Adeccoligaen	23	2	0	0	23	2
2009	Kongsvinger	Adeccoligaen	32	5	1	1	33	6
2010	Kongsvinger	Tippeligaen	29	2	3	0	32	2
2011	Brann	Tippeligaen	23	0	3	0	26	0
Career Total			163	14	8	2	171	16
