= Lars Henrik Skage =

Norwegian footballer (born 1992)

Personal information
- Date of birth: 9 February 1992 (age 34)
- Place of birth: Bergen, Norway
- Height: 1.78 m (5 ft 10 in)
- Position: Midfielder

Team information
- Current team: Lysekloster

Youth career
- Gneist

Senior career*
Years	Team	Apps	(Gls)
- Gneist
–2010	Fana		
2011	Brann	1	(0)
2012	Fana		
2012	Gneist		
2013–	Lysekloster	1	(0)
- * Club domestic league appearances and goals as of 17 April 2013

Lars Henrik Skage (born 9 February 1992) is a Norwegian footballer who plays for the Norwegian Lysekloster team.

He started his career in IL Gneist and Fana IL, and joined SK Brann in March 2011. He played one cup game and one league game as a substitute. In 2012, he rejoined Fana, but left for Gneist in the Fourth Division halfway through the season.
