= Nicolás Mezquida =

Uruguayan footballer (born 1992)

Personal information
- Full name: Gabriel Nicolás Mezquida Sero
- Date of birth: 21 January 1992 (age 34)
- Place of birth: Paysandú, Uruguay
- Height: 1.68 m (5 ft 6 in)
- Positions: Attacking midfielder; right winger

Team information
- Current team: Vancouver FC
- Number: 20

Youth career
- 2005–2008: Peñarol

Senior career*
Years	Team	Apps	(Gls)
2008–2012	Peñarol	3	(1)
2011	→ Brann (loan)	3	(0)
2011	→ Lillestrøm (loan)	1	(0)
2012–2014	Fénix	14	(1)
2013	→ Rampla Juniors (loan)	24	(7)
2014	Boston River	0	(0)
2014–2018	Vancouver Whitecaps FC	101	(12)
2015	→ Whitecaps FC 2 (loan)	1	(0)
2019–2022	Colorado Rapids	80	(6)
2022	→ Colorado Rapids 2 (loan)	2	(1)
2022–2023	Volos	22	(1)
2023	Deportivo Maldonado	12	(0)
2024	Ethnikos Achna	13	(2)
2024	Rampla Juniors	1	(0)
2025–	Vancouver FC	44	(6)

International career
2008–2009	Uruguay U17	5	(1)
- * Club domestic league appearances and goals as of 27 October 2026

Gabriel Nicolás Mezquida Sero (born 21 January 1992) is a Uruguayan professional footballer who plays as a midfielder for Vancouver FC on the Canadian Premier League.

== Club career ==
Mezquida began his career in the youth academy of Peñarol in 2006, before being promoted to the first team in the 2008 season. On 22 January 2009, at the age of 17, he signed a pre-contract with Schalke 04 worth a reported €2 million with the intent of joining the club at the end of the year. However, he changed his mind and decided to remain with Peñarol in South America. During his time with Peñarol, he had two loan spells with Norwegian clubs Brann and Lillestrøm. He joined Fénix in 2012, scoring one goal in 14 matches for the club. He was loaned out to Rampla Juniors in 2013 and scored seven goals in 24 matches for the club.

In September 2013, after leaving Fenix, Mezquida went on trial with Celtic of the Scottish Premiership but was ultimately not signed, potentially because of work permit eligibility issues, since he had not featured for the senior national side of Uruguay.

On 5 February 2014 Vancouver Whitecaps FC of Major League Soccer announced that they had signed Mezquida along with fellow Uruguayan Sebastián Fernández on a transfer from Boston River of the Uruguayan Segunda División where he had been playing since leaving Fenix. Mezquida went on to play five seasons for Vancouver, making 103 regular and postseason appearances, scoring 14 goals and adding four assists.

On 9 December 2018, Mezquida was traded along with $100,000 in TAM to the Colorado Rapids in exchange for Zac MacMath. In 2019, Mezquida made 32 MLS appearances while adding four goals and six assists - all career highs. In 2020, Mezquida made 17 appearances, 16 of them as a substitute, including in Colorado's first-round playoff loss at Minnesota United FC. Mezquida made his 150th career MLS regular season appearance on 8 November at Houston Dynamo.

On 28 June 2022, Mezquida was transferred to the Super League Greece club Volos.

== International career ==
Mezquida excelled whilst playing for Uruguay at U-15 level, scoring ten goals in 12 appearances, and was the top goal scorer at the 2007 South American Under-15 Football Championship, helping them finish as runners-up. He also played for the U-17 team at the international level.

== Career statistics ==
=== Club ===
As of match played 14 May 2022

Appearances and goals by club, season and competition
Club	Season	League			Playoffs		National cup		Continental		Total	
Club	Season	Division	Apps	Goals	Apps	Goals	Apps	Goals	Apps	Goals	Apps	Goals
Brann (loan)	2011	Eliteserien	1	0	—		0	0	—		1	0
Lillestrøm (loan)	2011	Eliteserien	3	0	—		—		—		3	0
Fénix	2011–12	Uruguayan Primera División	8	0	—		—		—		8	0
Fénix	2012–13	Uruguayan Primera División	6	1	—		—		—		6	1
Fénix	Total		14	1	0	0	0	0	0	0	14	1
Rampla Juniors (loan)	2013–14	Uruguayan Segunda División	10	2	—		—		—		10	2
Vancouver Whitecaps	2014	MLS	14	2	—		2	0	—		16	2
Vancouver Whitecaps	2015	MLS	18	1	0	0	2	0	2	0	22	1
Vancouver Whitecaps	2016	MLS	28	4	—		3	2	4	0	35	6
Vancouver Whitecaps	2017	MLS	20	2	2	2	2	1	—		24	5
Vancouver Whitecaps	2018	MLS	21	3	—		3	0	—		24	3
Vancouver Whitecaps	Total		101	12	2	2	12	3	6	0	121	17
Colorado Rapids	2019	MLS	32	4	—		1	1	—		33	5
Colorado Rapids	2020	MLS	17	1	1	0	—		—		18	1
Colorado Rapids	2021	MLS	22	1	—		—		—		22	1
Colorado Rapids	2022	MLS	9	0	0	0	1	1	1	0	11	1
Colorado Rapids	Total		80	6	1	0	2	2	1	0	84	8
Career total			209	21	3	2	14	5	7	0	233	28
