= Terje Liverød =

Norwegian footballer and agent (born 1955)

Personal information
- Full name: Terje Liverød
- Date of birth: 18 July 1955 (age 71)
- Place of birth: Tønsberg, Norway
- Position: Right back

Senior career*
Years	Team	Apps	(Gls)
1973–1977	Sandefjord BK	?	(?)
1977	Brønshøj BK	?	(?)
1978	Akademisk Boldklub	?	(?)
1979	Kjøbenhavns Boldklub	?	(?)
1980	Sandefjord BK	?	(?)
1981–1982	Boldklubben Frem	?	(?)
1986–1987	Sandefjord BK	?	(?)
- * Club domestic league appearances and goals

Terje Liverød (born 18 July 1955) is a Norwegian player agent and former footballer.

== Playing career ==
Liverød, who lives in Uruguay, was born in Tønsberg, but hails from Sandefjord and played more than 100 matches for the local club Sandefjord BK. In 1977, he left his hometown and moved to Denmark, where he played for various top clubs, including Kjøbenhavns Boldklub (now FC Copenhagen). Liverod also played in Brasil and Singapore, before he returned to Norway where he ended his career with Sandefjord BK in 1987.

== Career outside football ==
Liverod has a master's degree in Economics and Business Administration and has been managing textile industries in South America. He was for a while managing director of the Norwegian company Jordan AS in Latin America and later on Far East and Australia. He is among others known in Norway for his relationship with Diego Maradona; Liverød was Maradona's agent in Europe and managed his "Showbol Argentina" tour in 2006.

Liverod has been working as a player agent with base in Uruguay and have scouted or assisted several top South-American players being transferred to European clubs, among others Claudio Pizarro who he discovered in Peru in 1999 together with Paul Walsh, José Oscar Flores ("Turu"), Darío Rodríguez, Rafinha, Lucas Pratto when he was 19 years old and Matias Almeyda.

Liverød has worked as scout and South American consultant for various top clubs in Europe, including FC Schalke 04 of Germany. In 2008, he tried to start a cooperation between Schalke and the Norwegian club FK Lyn, but the attempt failed. In 2007 and 2008, Matias Almeyda and Liverød attempted to buy the at that time Norwegian top club FC Lyn, where Almeyda had been playing, and later on Sandefjord Fotball, a club from Liverød's hometown. However, both negotiations were unsuccessful.

During the 2006 and 2010 FIFA World Cup's, Liverod worked part-time for the Norwegian television station TV 2 and during 2014 FIFA World Cup for the state channel NRK (Norway). In connection with 2014 FIFA World Cup Liverød made a documentary with and about the legend from the 1950 FIFA World Cup final; Alcides Ghiggia. The film was shown on TV channels in South America and also used by his friend Maradona on the latter's program "De Zurda" as well as by NRK (Norway) during the 2014 FIFA World Cup.
