= Hassan El Fakiri =

Norwegian footballer (born 1977)

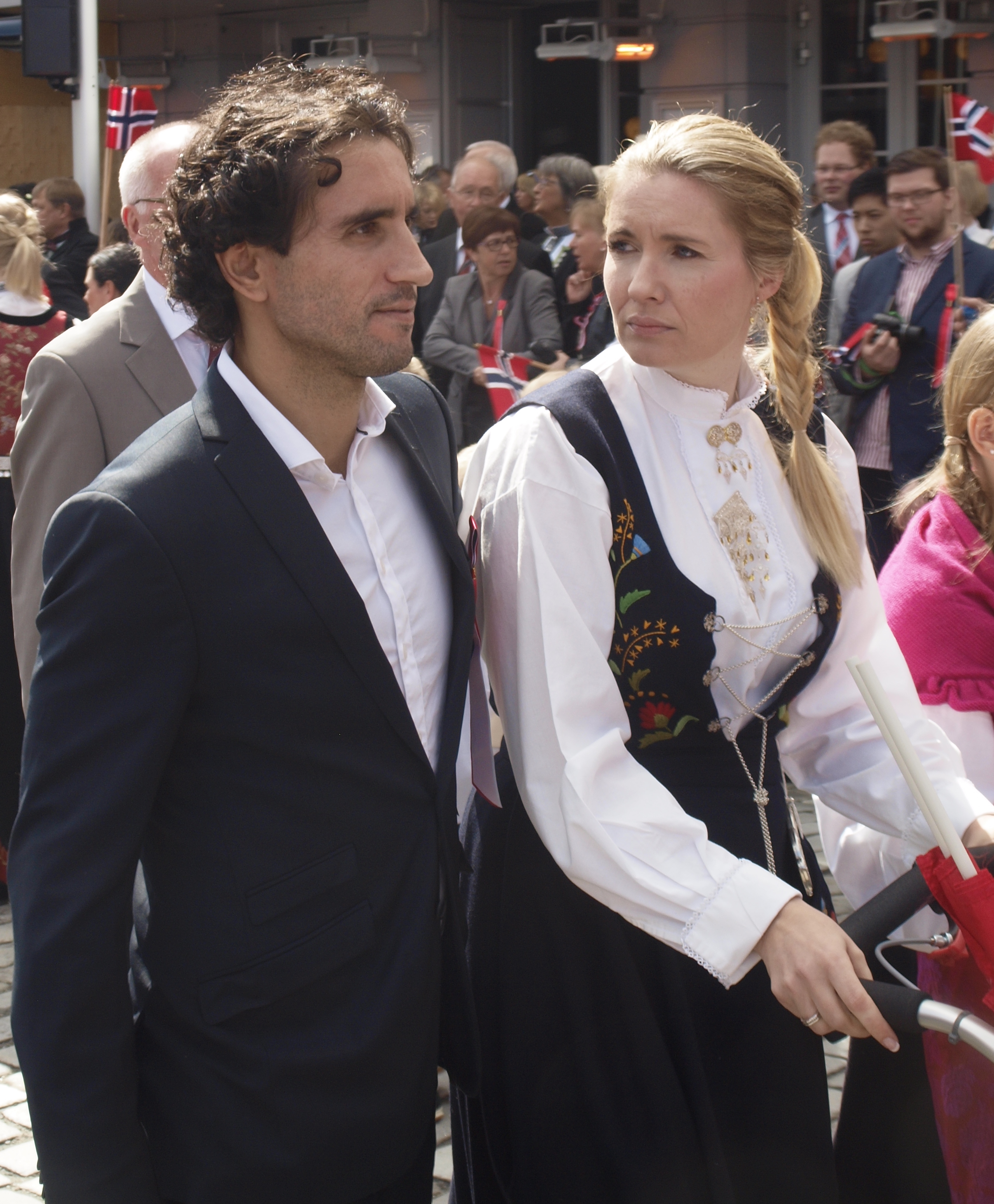
- El Fakiri in 2014

Personal information
- Full name: Hassan El Fakiri
- Date of birth: 18 April 1977 (age 49)
- Place of birth: Amezzaourou, Morocco
- Height: 1.74 m (5 ft 9 in)
- Positions: Right back; defensive midfielder

Team information
- Current team: Brann (Player Development Coach)

Youth career
- Lyn

Senior career*
Years	Team	Apps	(Gls)
1995–1999	Lyn	85	(7)
2000	Brann	9	(2)
2000–2005	Monaco	41	(0)
2001	→ Lyn (loan)	13	(1)
2001–2002	→ Rosenborg (loan)	17	(0)
2005–2007	Borussia Mönchengladbach	49	(1)
2007–2014	Brann	150	(1)
Total		364	(12)

International career
2004–2006	Norway	8	(0)

Managerial career
- 2015–2017: Os
- 2024–2026: Saint-Étienne (Assistant manager)
- 2026–: Brann (Player Development Coach)
- * Club domestic league appearances and goals

Hassan El Fakiri (Arabic: حسن الفكيري, Ḥasan al-Fakīrī, pronounced [ˈħas.san el faˈkiː.ri]; born 18 April 1977) is a former professional footballer, and the current Player Development Coach of Eliteserien club Brann. Born in Morocco, he represented the Norway national team.

== Career ==
Born in Amezzaourou, a town in the commune of Temsamane, Morocco, El Fakiri started his career with the Norwegian, Oslo-based club Lyn. He made his debut in game against local rivals Skeid on 28 May 1995. As a young and talented midfielder, El Fakiri earned the admiration of the Lyn fans, who made him player of the year in 1997.

El Fakiri joined SK Brann in 2000, instantly catching the eyes of scouts from the French-registered, Monaco based football club, AS Monaco FC. Due to SK Brann's dire financial straits at the time, El Fakiri was sold to the French Ligue 1 team before he had actually played a league game for SK Brann. El Fakiri played nine league games for SK Brann, scoring three goals, before leaving Bergen in the transfer window. One of the most notable contributions from El Fakiri was a sterling performance in midfield in the first game of the 2000 Tippeliga season, a 4–1 home drubbing of local rivals Viking FK. Two of the goals in this game was scored by the striker Mons Ivar Mjelde, who later re-signed El Fakiri, this time as the manager of SK Brann.

El Fakiri's stay in Monaco started off slowly, being sent out on loan to both his boyhood Norwegian team Lyn and Rosenborg BK. The 2002–03 French League 1 season saw El Fakiri's fortunes change, with AS Monaco coach Didier Deschamps' preferring to use the midfielder as a right back. El Fakiri was an unused substitute in the 2004 Champions League final between Monaco and Portuguese side FC Porto.

El Fakiri's contract with Monaco expired in 2005, and he chose to continue his career with Borussia Mönchengladbach, joining the Bundesliga side on a Bosman free transfer. At Borussia, he returned to his favoured midfield berth, helping the side to tenth place in the 2005–06 Bundesliga. However, the next season Borussia were relegated from the Bundesliga after losing 1–0 at home to VfB Stuttgart on the last matchday.

The relegation coincided with El Fakiri's contract expiring, and after considering several contract proposals from Norwegian clubs, he returned to Brann seven years after he left Brann for Monaco. His return to Bergen was a happy one, helping SK Brann to their first Norwegian championship in 44 years.

== International career ==
El Fakiri was capped eight times by the Norway national team.

== Career statistics ==
Season	Club	Division	League		Cup		Total	
Season	Club	Division	Apps	Goals	Apps	Goals	Apps	Goals
2007	Brann	Tippeligaen	9	1	0	0	9	1
2008	Brann	Tippeligaen	16	0	4	0	20	0
2009	Brann	Tippeligaen	27	0	5	0	32	2
2010	Brann	Tippeligaen	25	0	2	0	27	0
2011	Brann	Tippeligaen	30	0	5	0	35	0
2012	Brann	Tippeligaen	11	0	4	0	15	0
2013	Brann	Tippeligaen	16	0	1	0	17	0
2014	Brann	Tippeligaen	16	0	3	0	19	0
Career total			150	1	24	0	174	1

== Honours ==
Monaco

- Coupe de la Ligue: 2002–03
- UEFA Champions League: Runner-up 2003–04

Brann

- Norwegian Premier League: 2007
