= Svein-Erik Edvartsen =

Norwegian football referee and sports management professional

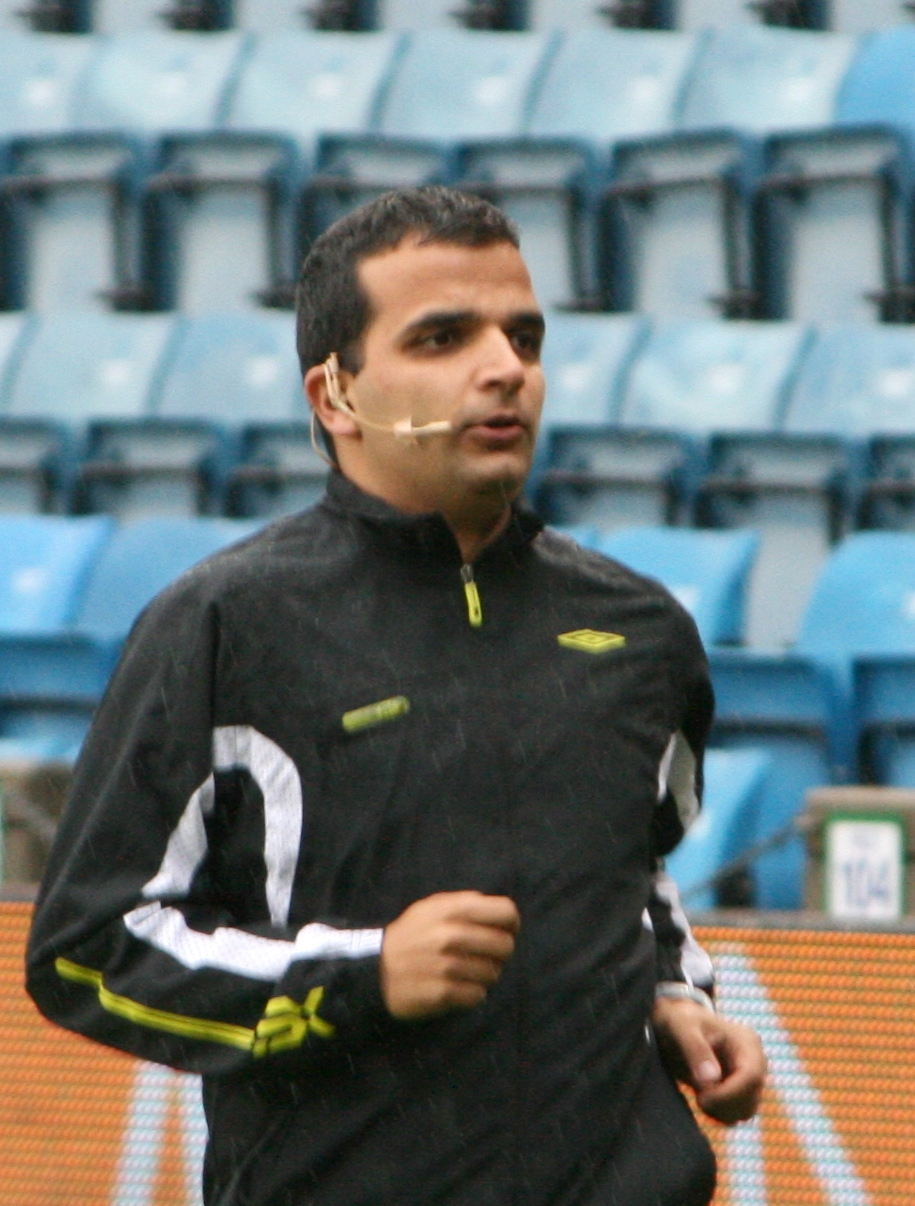
- Edvartsen in April 2009
- Born: 21 May 1979 (age 47); Oslo, Norway

Domestic
Years	League	Role
2006 -	Eliteserien	Referee

International
Years	League	Role
2007 -	UEFA and FIFA	Referee

Svein-Erik Edvartsen (born 21 May 1979) is a Norwegian football referee and sports management professional.

== Career ==
He debuted as a first division referee on 11 August 2002 in the game between Skeid and Tromsdalen. He debuted as a referee in the Norwegian Premier League in 2006. Edvartsen is also a referee principal in the Norwegian Ice Hockey Federation and represents Hamar IL (football) and Storhamar Dragons (hockey). In 2010, an IK Start chairman called Edvartsen a "Tandori [sic] referee". The case received extensive press coverage. Edvartsen became a FIFA referee in 2013.

He is at present the CEO of the ice hockey club Lørenskog, and has previously been CEO at Storhamar and football club Hamarkameratene.

== Personal life ==
Edvartsen was born in Oslo on 21 May 1979, and has lived in Norway since. His grandparents are from Pakistan.
