= Bjarte Haugsdal =

Norwegian footballer (born 1990)

Personal information
- Full name: Bjarte Haugsdal
- Date of birth: 9 March 1990 (age 36)
- Place of birth: Os Municipality, Norway
- Height: 1.83 m (6 ft 0 in)
- Positions: Winger; striker

Youth career
- –2006: Lysekloster

Senior career*
Years	Team	Apps	(Gls)
2007–2008	Os		
2009–2011	Brann	18	(1)
2010	→ Løv-Ham (loan)	10	(0)
2012–2013	Stabæk	45	(5)
2014–2019	Nest-Sotra	157	(7)
2020	Øygarden	21	(5)
2021–2022	Åsane	54	(7)

International career
2007	Norway U17	4	(0)
2008	Norway U18	5	(1)
2009	Norway U19	2	(0)
- * Club domestic league appearances and goals as of 3 May 2023

Bjarte Haugsdal (born 9 March 1990) is a Norwegian footballer who last played for Åsane Fotball in 1. divisjon. He has previously played for Os, Brann, Løv-Ham, Stabæk and Nest-Sotra/Øygarden.

== Career ==
=== Early years ===
Haugsdal grew up in Lysefjorden in Os Municipality, south of Bergen. In his early years he has played for Lysekloster IL and later Os TF.

=== SK Brann ===
Haugsdal signed with Brann in November 2008. He made his debut for Brann in a pre season friendly against Legia Warszawa on 24 January 2009. After playing in Brann 2 for most of the 2009 season, Haugsdal debuted in the Norwegian top division on 1 November 2009 against Rosenborg BK when he was used as a substitute. Haugsdal scored his first official Brann goal on 10 June 2011 in a league match against Sogndal.

Brann did not offer Haugsdal a new contract after the 2011 season. and he joined Stabæk on a free transfer and signed a two-year contract with the club on 16 February 2012

== Career statistics ==
Season	Club	Division	League		Cup		Total	
Season	Club	Division	Apps	Goals	Apps	Goals	Apps	Goals
2009	Brann	Tippeligaen	1	0	0	0	1	0
2010	Brann	Tippeligaen	6	0	1	0	7	0
2010	Løv-Ham	1. divisjon	10	1	0	0	10	1
2011	Brann	Tippeligaen	11	1	2	0	13	1
2012	Stabæk	Tippeligaen	21	3	2	1	23	4
2013	Stabæk	1. divisjon	24	2	4	0	28	2
2014	Nest-Sotra	1. divisjon	24	0	1	0	25	0
2015	Nest-Sotra	1. divisjon	26	0	2	0	28	0
2016	Nest-Sotra	2. divisjon	24	0	4	0	28	0
2017	Nest-Sotra	2. divisjon	25	1	3	0	28	1
2018	Nest-Sotra	1. divisjon	29	1	3	0	32	1
2019	Nest-Sotra	1. divisjon	29	5	2	0	31	5
2020	Øygarden	1. divisjon	21	5	–		21	5
Career total			252	19	24	1	276	20
