= Bjørnar Holmvik =

Norwegian footballer and coach (born 1985)

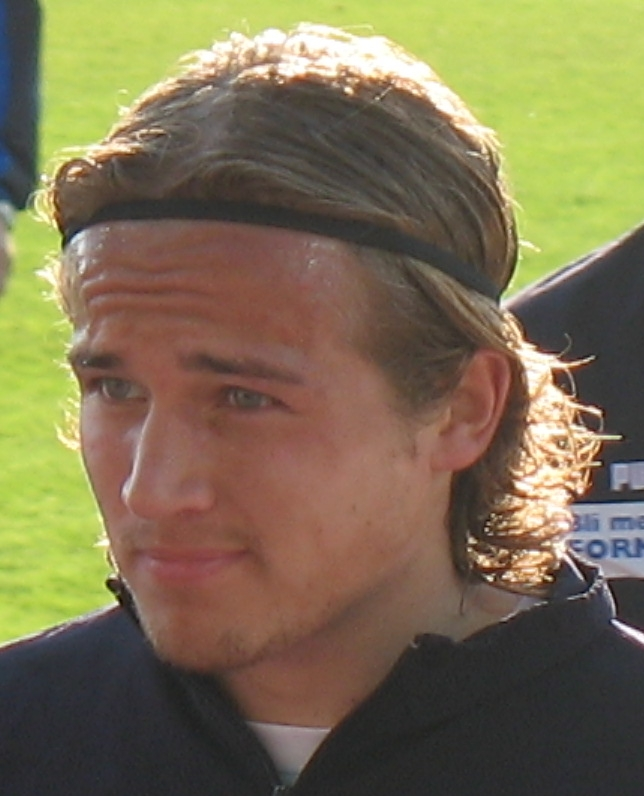

Personal information
- Full name: Bjørnar Pettersen Holmvik
- Date of birth: 2 June 1985 (age 41)
- Place of birth: Oslo, Norway
- Height: 1.75 m (5 ft 9 in)
- Position: Left back

Team information
- Current team: Vidar (player-manager)

Youth career
- –2002: Grei
- 2002–2003: Stabæk

Senior career*
Years	Team	Apps	(Gls)
2003–2008	Stabæk	91	(3)
2009–2011	Brann	57	(1)
2012–2013	Sandnes Ulf	36	(1)
2013	Kalmar	11	(1)
2014	Fredrikstad	27	(1)
2015–2016	Bryne	56	(4)
2017–2018	Vidar	34	(1)
2018–2019	Sandnes Ulf	32	(3)
2021–	Vidar	0	(0)

International career
2001	Norway U-16	9	(1)
2002	Norway U-17	8	(0)
2003	Norway U-18	11	(0)
2004	Norway U-19	6	(0)
2006	Norway U-21	3	(0)

Managerial career
- 2020–: Vidar (player-manager)
- * Club domestic league appearances and goals

Bjørnar Pettersen Holmvik (born 2 June 1985) is a Norwegian football coach and former player. As a player, Holmvik played as a defender and winger. He is currently head coach at Vidar.

He played for Stabæk from 2003 to 2008 and for SK Brann from 2009 to 2011. SK Brann did not wish to renew Bjørnar Holmvik's contract and he went on to sign with newly promoted Tippeliga-club Sandnes Ulf. On 28 July he signed a contract with the Swedish club Kalmar.

In 2015, he joined Bryne. Seeing through his two-year contract, in 2017 he went on to third-tier club FK Vidar.

In July 2018, Holmvik returned to Sandnes Ulf. After the end of the 2019 season, Holmvik retired as player and became head coach of 3. divisjon club Vidar. After the 2020. 3. divisjon was cancelled because of the COVID-19 pandemic, Holmvik played his first Vidar match as a substitute in the second round of the 2021 Norwegian Football Cup.

== Career statistics ==
Season	Club	Division	League		Cup		Total	
Season	Club	Division	Apps	Goals	Apps	Goals	Apps	Goals
2004	Stabæk	Eliteserien	1	0	0	0	1	0
2005	Stabæk	1. divisjon	29	2	5	0	34	2
2006	Stabæk	Eliteserien	21	1	3	0	24	1
2007	Stabæk	Eliteserien	21	0	6	0	27	0
2008	Stabæk	Eliteserien	19	0	5	0	24	0
2009	Brann	Eliteserien	22	0	4	1	26	1
2010	Brann	Eliteserien	14	0	2	0	16	0
2011	Brann	Eliteserien	21	1	7	0	28	1
2012	Sandnes Ulf	Eliteserien	21	0	0	0	21	0
2013	Sandnes Ulf	Eliteserien	15	1	0	0	15	1
2013	Kalmar	Allsvenskan	11	1	0	0	11	1
2014	Fredrikstad	1. divisjon	27	1	2	0	29	1
2015	Bryne	1. divisjon	28	3	1	0	29	3
2016	Bryne	1. divisjon	28	1	1	1	29	2
2017	Vidar	2. divisjon	24	1	1	0	25	1
2018	Vidar	2. divisjon	10	0	1	0	11	0
2018	Sandnes Ulf	1. divisjon	11	2	0	0	11	2
2019	Sandnes Ulf	1. divisjon	21	1	2	1	23	2
Career total			344	15	40	4	384	19

== Honours ==
=== Norway ===
- Eliteserien: 2008
- Norwegian Football Cup: 2008 (runner-up)
