= Kim Ojo =

Nigerian footballer

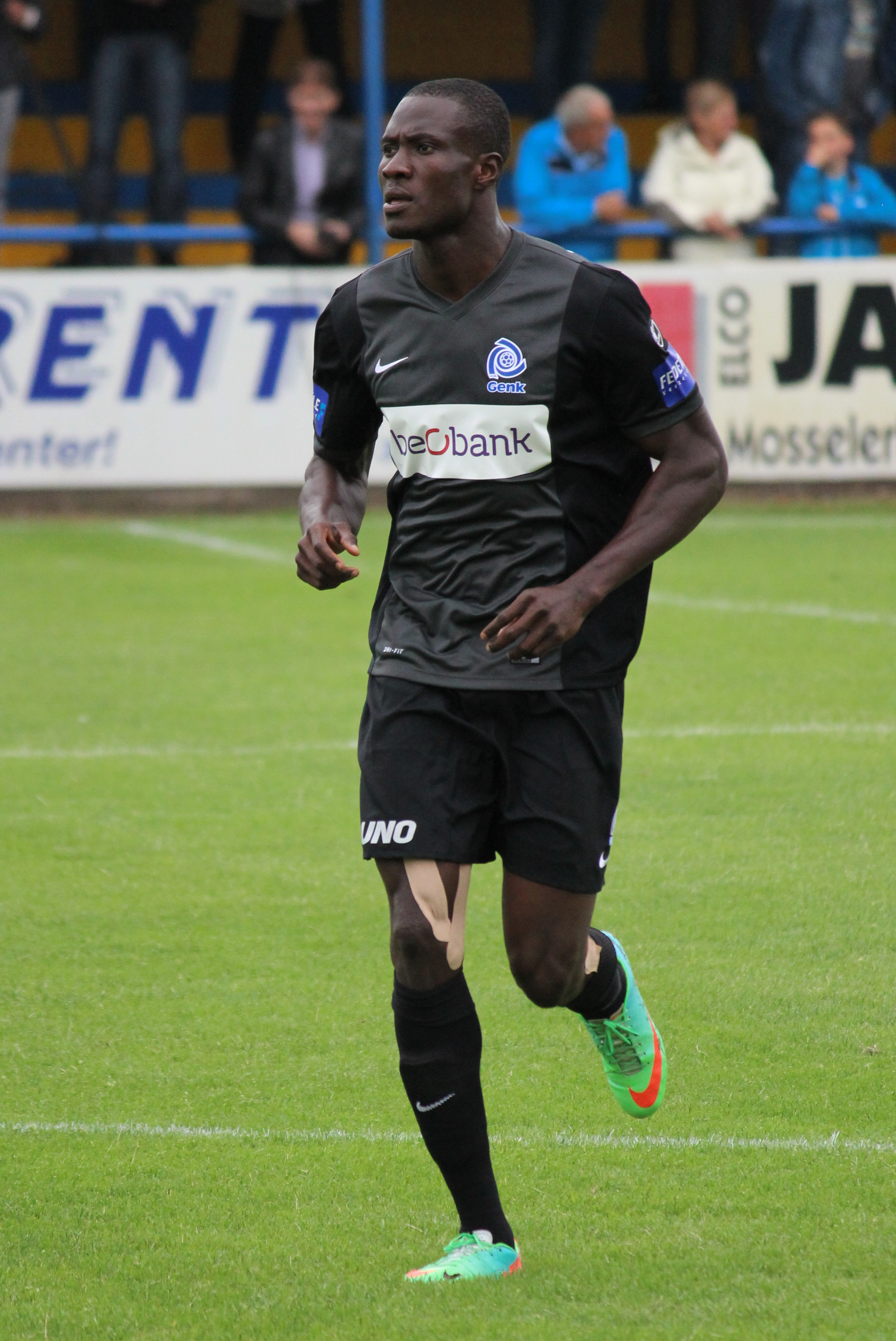
- Ojo in 2014

Personal information
- Date of birth: 2 December 1988 (age 37)
- Place of birth: Warri, Nigeria
- Height: 1.92 m (6 ft 4 in)
- Position: Centre forward

Youth career
- Plateau United

Senior career*
Years	Team	Apps	(Gls)
2004–2008	Plateau United		
2008–2010	Nybergsund-Trysil	76	(37)
2011–2012	Brann	57	(26)
2013–2015	Genk	9	(1)
2014–2015	→ Újpest (loan)	15	(4)
2015–2016	OH Leuven	12	(1)
2016–2018	Lyngby BK	31	(6)
- * Club domestic league appearances and goals

Kim Ojo (born 2 December 1988) is a Nigerian former professional footballer who last played as a centre forward.

== Career ==
Ojo was born in Warri, Nigeria. He began his career with Plateau United where he was discovered by FIFA agent Marcelo Houseman and in 2008 Atta Aneke took him on trial with Lyn Oslo. In February 2008 signed for Nybergsund and scored 14 goals during his first season there. In December 2009 he trained with TSV 1860 Munich while on trial there, at that time he had already trained with FC Midtjylland.

In September 2016 Ojo signed a one-year contract with Lyngby BK.

== International career ==
In 2007, Ojo was called up to the Nigeria U-23 team.

== Personal life ==
Kim Ojo is a Christian.

== Career statistics ==
Appearances and goals by club, season and competition
Club	Season	League			National Cup		Other		Total	
Club	Season	Division	Apps	Goals	Apps	Goals	Apps	Goals	Apps	Goals
Nybergsund	2008	Adeccoligaen	26	10	0	0	–		26	10
Nybergsund	2009	Adeccoligaen	26	14	2	0	–		28	14
Nybergsund	2010	Adeccoligaen	24	13	3	0	–		27	13
Nybergsund	Total		76	37	5	0	0	0	81	37
Brann	2011	Tippeligaen	28	15	7	3	–		35	18
Brann	2012	Tippeligaen	29	11	5	4	–		34	15
Brann	Total		57	26	12	7	0	0	69	33
Genk	2012–13	Belgian Pro League	2	1	0	0	8 (Note: Appearances in Belgian Pro League play-offs)	0	10	1
Genk	2013–14	Belgian Pro League	7	0	0	0	0	0	7	0
Genk	Total		9	1	0	0	8	0	17	1
Újpest (loan)	2014–15	Nemzeti Bajnokság I	15	4	4	1	2 (Note: Appearances in Hungarian League Cup)	1	21	6
OH Leuven	2015–16	Belgian Pro League	12	1	0	0	0	0	12	1
Lyngby BK	2016–17	Danish Superliga	16	3	0	0	–		16	3
Lyngby BK	2017–18	Danish Superliga	15	3	0	0	4 (Note: Appearances in Danish Superliga play-offs)	0	19	3
Lyngby BK	Total		31	6	0	0	4	0	35	6
Career total			200	75	21	8	14	1	235	84

== Honours ==
Genk

- Belgian Cup: 2012–13
