= Fredrik Haugen =

Norwegian footballer (born 1992)

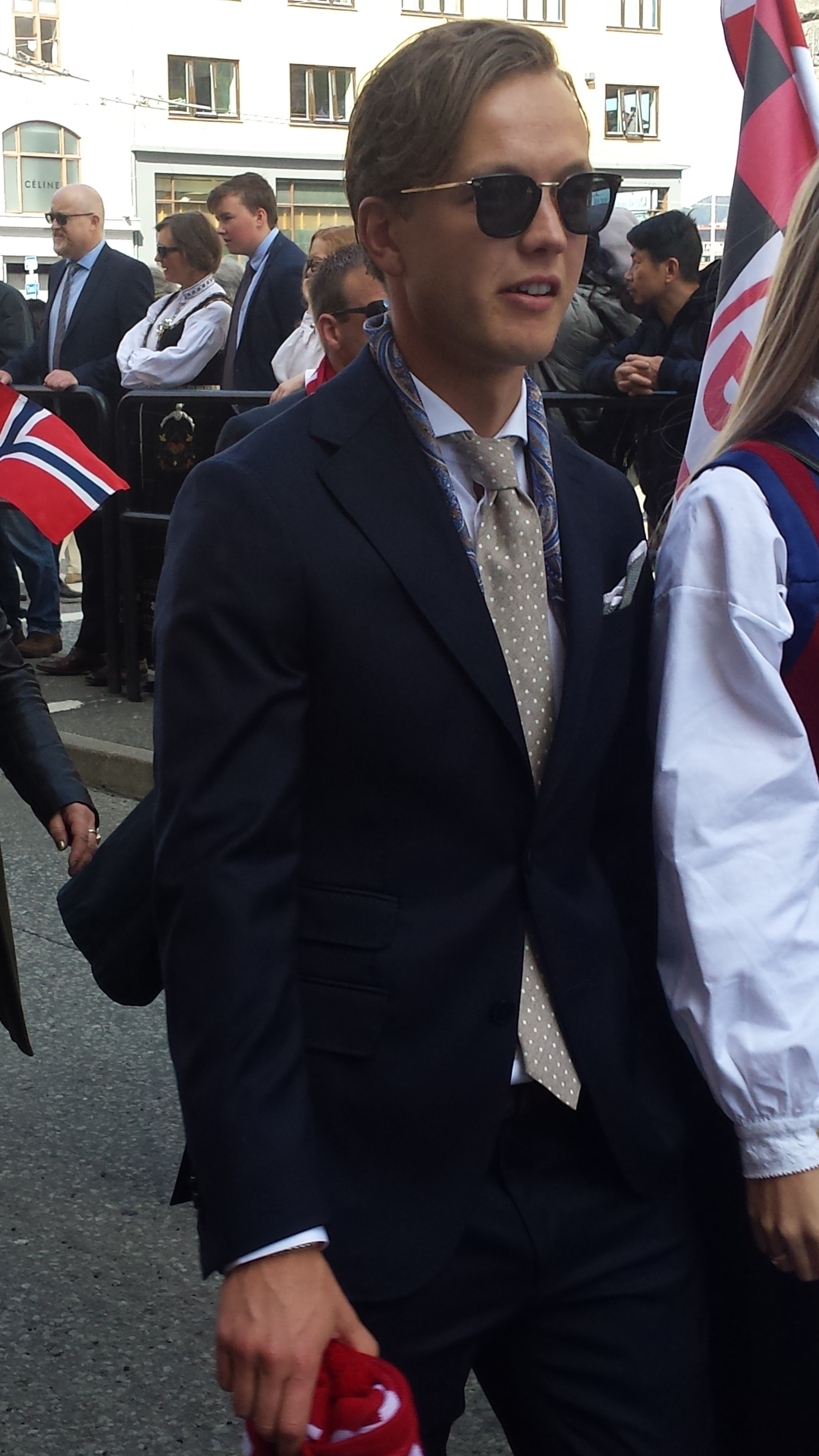

Personal information
- Date of birth: 13 June 1992 (age 34)
- Place of birth: Bergen, Norway
- Height: 1.82 m (5 ft 11 1/2 in)
- Position: Centre midfielder

Team information
- Current team: Fana
- Number: 23

Youth career
- –2009: Løv-Ham

Senior career*
Years	Team	Apps	(Gls)
2009–2010	Løv-Ham	42	(10)
2011–2020	Brann	247	(26)
2020–2021	AEK Larnaca	9	(0)
2021	Stabæk	13	(3)
2022	Aalesund	18	(0)
2023	Stabæk	13	(0)
2024–	Fana	3	(0)

International career^{‡}
2009	Norway U17	2	(0)
2011	Norway U19	3	(0)
2013	Norway U21	3	(0)
- * Club domestic league appearances and goals as of 27 October 2024 ‡ National team caps and goals as of 14 January 2012

Fredrik Haugen (born 13 June 1992) is a Norwegian footballer who plays for Fana.

== Club career ==
=== Løv-Ham ===
On 4 December 2008, a 16-year-old Haugen signed a professional contract with Løv-Ham. Upon the signing, Løv-Ham manager Trond Amundsen described Haugen as "a central midfielder...[who] has a very smart footballing head, and extreme skills to create and pass." He made his professional debut on 26 April 2009 as a late substitution against Sogndal. In his second appearance, Haugen, despite coming on as an 80th minute substitution, scored Løv-Ham's third goal in a 4-1 win over Sarpsborg 08. On 18 June 2009, Løv-Ham beat Start in a penalty shoot-out which finished 14-13 in the Norwegian Cup - Haugen showed calmness to score two penalties in the shoot-out. As the season progressed, he began to start with regularity, amounting thirteen starts in 2009, mostly between June and August. Throughout the autumn, Haugen spent most of his time training with Brann.

In August 2021, Haugen signed a short-term deal with Stabæk.

On 31 March 2022, Haugen joined Aalesund on a one-year deal.

== Career statistics ==
=== Club ===
As of match played 23 July 2023

Appearances and goals by club, season and competition
Club	Season	League			National Cup		Continental		Other		Total	
Club	Season	Division	Apps	Goals	Apps	Goals	Apps	Goals	Apps	Goals	Apps	Goals
Løv-Ham	2009	1. divisjon	21	2	2	0	-		-		23	2
Løv-Ham	2010	1. divisjon	21	8	3	0	-		-		24	8
Løv-Ham	Total		42	10	5	0	-	-	-	-	47	10
Brann	2011	Tippeligaen	25	2	5	1	-		-		30	3
Brann	2012	Tippeligaen	25	0	3	0	-		-		28	0
Brann	2013	Tippeligaen	26	1	0	0	-		-		26	1
Brann	2014	Tippeligaen	29	2	4	1	-		-		33	3
Brann	2015	OBOS-ligaen	26	4	2	0	-		-		28	4
Brann	2016	Tippeligaen	27	5	1	0	-		-		28	5
Brann	2017	Eliteserien	29	5	3	0	2	0	1	0	35	5
Brann	2018	Eliteserien	27	4	1	0	-		-		28	4
Brann	2019	Eliteserien	14	2	1	0	2	0	-		17	2
Brann	2020	Eliteserien	19	1	0	0	-		-		19	1
Brann	Total		247	26	20	2	4	0	1	0	272	28
AEK Larnaca	2020–21	Cyta Championship	9	0	0	0	-		-		9	0
AEK Larnaca	2021–22	Cyta Championship	0	0	0	0	-		-		0	0
AEK Larnaca	Total		9	0	0	0	-	-	-	-	9	0
Stabæk	2021	Eliteserien	13	3	1	0	-		-		14	3
Stabæk	Total		13	3	1	0	-	-	-	-	14	3
Aalesund	2022	Eliteserien	18	0	0	0	-		-		18	0
Aalesund	Total		18	0	0	0	-	-	-	-	18	0
Stabæk	2023	Eliteserien	8	0	3	0	-		-		11	0
Stabæk	Total		8	0	3	0	-	-	-	-	11	0
Career total			336	39	29	2	4	0	1	0	370	41

== Honours ==
=== Individual ===
- Eliteserien Top assist provider: 2017
