= Diego Guastavino =

Uruguayan footballer (born 1984)

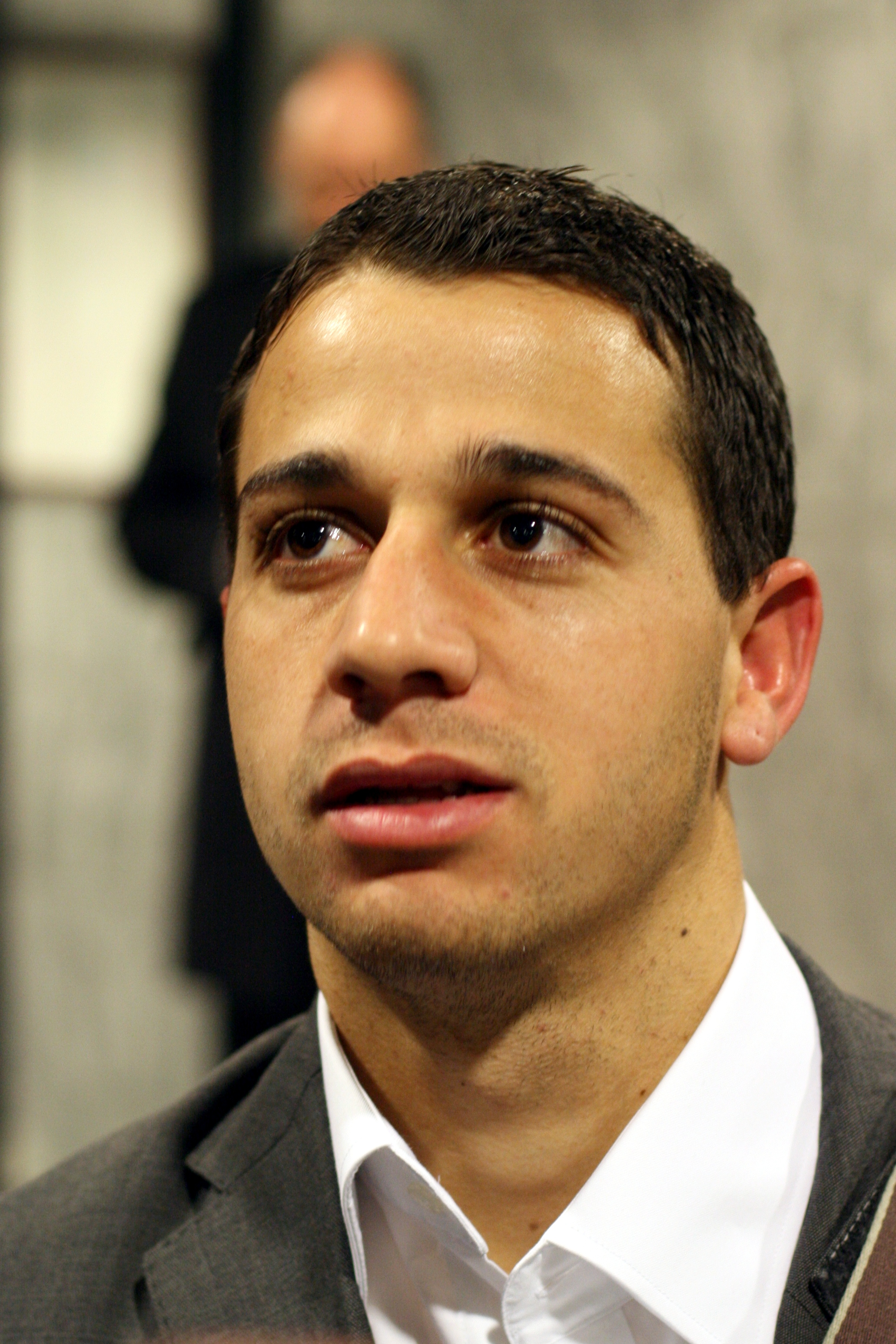

Personal information
- Full name: Diego Nicolás Guastavino Bentancor
- Date of birth: 26 July 1984 (age 42)
- Place of birth: Montevideo, Uruguay
- Height: 1.68 m (5 ft 6 in)
- Position: Attacking midfielder

Senior career*
Years	Team	Apps	(Gls)
2002–2003	Sud América	15	(10)
2004	Deportivo Maldonado	18	(1)
2005–2006	Lugano	33	(2)
2007	River Plate	6	(0)
2007	Deportivo Maldonado	10	(3)
2008–2009	Lyn	36	(11)
2009–2011	Brann	59	(18)
2012–2014	Querétaro	23	(1)
2013–2014	→ Universitario (loan)	39	(8)
2015	Universidad de Concepción	17	(3)
2016–2017	Universitario	63	(12)
2018	Liverpool (Montevideo)	21	(6)
2018	Santa Fe	15	(5)
2019	Liverpool Montevideo	24	(4)
2020	Carlos A. Mannucci	17	(6)
2021-2022	Atenas de San Carlos	13	(0)
2022-2024	C.A. Progreso	11	(0)
- * Club domestic league appearances and goals as of 12:16, 3 May 2020 (UTC)

Diego Nicolás Guastavino Bentancor (born 26 July 1984) is a Uruguayan footballer who currently plays as an attacking midfielder.

== Career ==
Guastavino started his career playing for Sud América. After a brief spell in Deportivo Maldonado, he emigrated to Swiss football to play for Lugano. He returned home in 2007 to River Plate, and again at Deportivo Maldonado.

He came to FC Lyn Oslo in March 2008 on recommendation by and help from Terje Liverød and Matías Almeyda.

On 4 August 2009 he moved to SK Brann.

=== Querétaro ===
In June 2012, he signed a new deal with Primera División de México side Querétaro F.C.

He was released from his contract in September 2014 in order to leave a spot for Ronaldinho to join the team.

== Career statistics ==
Season	Club	Division	League		Cup		Total	
Season	Club	Division	Apps	Goals	Apps	Goals	Apps	Goals
2008	Lyn	Tippeligaen	18	4	2	1	20	5
2009	Lyn	Tippeligaen	18	7	4	1	22	8
2009	Brann	Tippeligaen	8	2	1	0	9	2
2010	Brann	Tippeligaen	22	9	2	0	24	9
2011	Brann	Tippeligaen	29	7	5	2	34	9
2012–13	Querétaro	Liga MX	13	1	2	2	15	3
2013	Universitario	Peruvian Primera División	39	8	0	0	39	8
Career Total			147	38	16	6	163	44

== Honors ==
=== Club ===
Universitario de Deportes

- Torneo Descentralizado: 2013
- Peruvian Primera División: Apertura 2016

Universidad de Concepción

- Copa Chile (1): 2014-15

Liverpool F.C. (Montevideo)

- 2019 Torneo Intermedio
