= Chukwuma Akabueze =

Nigerian footballer (born 1989)

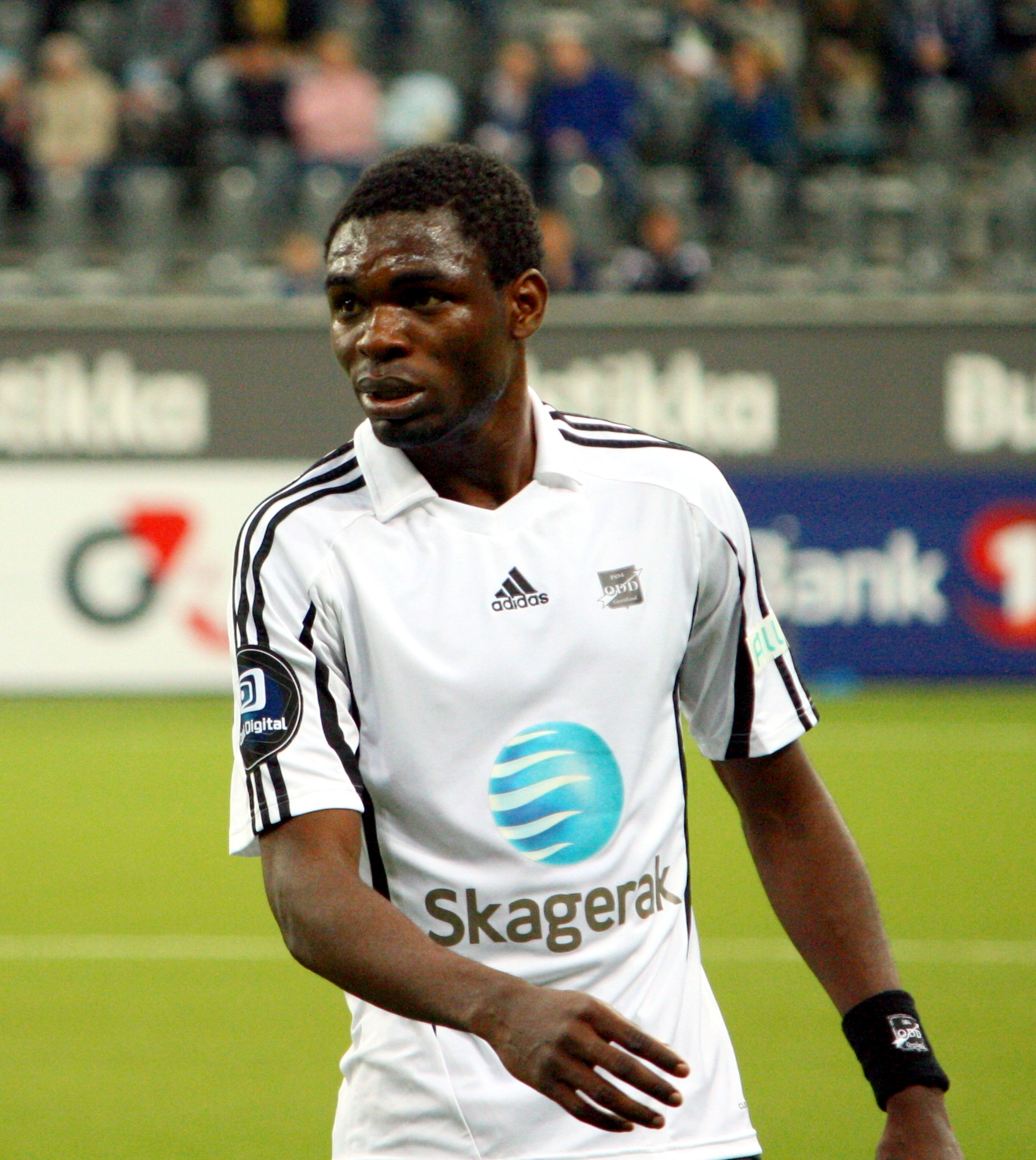
- Chukwuma Akabueze in 2009

Personal information
- Full name: Chukwuma Akabueze
- Date of birth: 6 May 1989 (age 37)
- Place of birth: Ilorin, Nigeria
- Height: 1.80 m (5 ft 11 in)
- Positions: Winger; forward

Youth career
- –2004: Kwara United

Senior career*
Years	Team	Apps	(Gls)
2005–2007	Kwara United	18	(9)
2007–2011	Odd	95	(32)
2011–2012	SK Brann	53	(13)
2013	Wuhan Zall	27	(3)
2014–2016	Odd	89	(19)
2017–2019	Boluspor	79	(16)
2019–2021	Ümraniyespor	55	(3)
2021–2022	Bandırmaspor	31	(3)
2023–2024	Gençlerbirliği	37	(1)
2024	Miracle Degirmenlik SK		
2025	Şanlıurfaspor	17	(1)

International career
2007	Nigeria	2	(1)
- * Club domestic league appearances and goals as of 1 July 2025

Chukwuma Akabueze (born 6 May 1989), nicknamed Bentley, is a Nigerian professional footballer who last played for Turkish club Şanlıurfaspor.

== Club career ==
The former striker of Kwara United before he was taken to Odd Grenland in July 2007. He has a very good left foot which he utilised in scoring a stunner against Zambia in the second round stage of the 2007 FIFA U-20 World Cup. His skill is another asset to him evident by the goal he scored in the 1–1 draw with Rosenborg BK on 2 August 2009. On 24 February 2011, he signed for SK Brann.

On 19 February 2013, Bentley transferred to Chinese Super League club Wuhan Zall.

== International career ==
He was a member of the Nigerian team that took part in the 2007 FIFA U-20 World Cup in Canada, in which they were eliminated in the quarter-final by Chile.

=== International goals ===
Scores and results list Nigeria's goal tally first.

No	Date	Venue	Opponent	Score	Result	Competition
1.	27 May 2007	Moi International Sports Centre, Nairobi, Kenya	Kenya	1–0	1–0	Friendly
