= Erik Mjelde =

Norwegian footballer (born 1984)

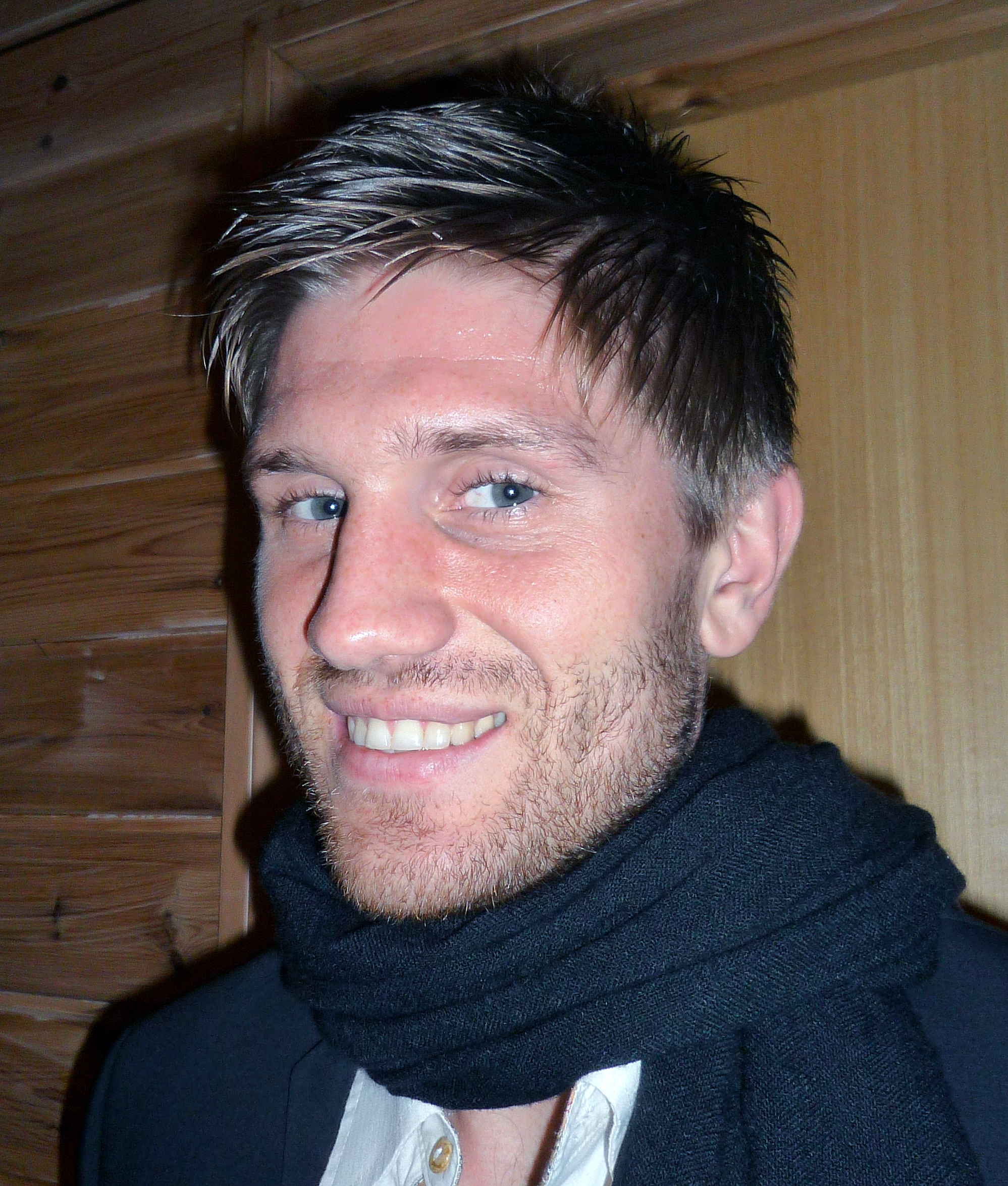

Personal information
- Full name: Erik Nævdal Mjelde
- Date of birth: 6 March 1984 (age 42)
- Place of birth: Bergen, Norway
- Height: 1.79 m (5 ft 10 in)
- Position: Midfielder

Team information
- Current team: Arna-Bjørnar (manager)

Senior career*
Years	Team	Apps	(Gls)
2002–2003	Brann	4	(0)
2003–2005	Løv-Ham	40	(5)
2006–2009	Sandefjord	88	(23)
2010–2012	Brann	83	(13)
2013–2014	Lillestrøm	44	(4)
2015–2019	Sandefjord	110	(17)
Total		369	(62)

International career
2000	Norway U16	5	(1)
2001	Norway U17	3	(0)
2002	Norway U18	8	(2)
2003	Norway U19	5	(3)
2006	Norway U21	1	(0)

Managerial career
- 2024-: Arna-Bjørnar
- * Club domestic league appearances and goals

Erik Nævdal Mjelde (born 6 March 1984) is a Norwegian football manager for the Arna-Bjørnar women's team and former professional footballer who played as a midfielder. Among his previous clubs are Sandefjord, Lillestrøm, SK Brann and Løv-Ham Fotball. Prior to joining Brann at the age of 16, he played for Fri.

== Career ==
Mjelde made his debut for the Norway U21 national team in 2006 where he played one game. He also played a series of games for other youth national teams (U16, U17, U19).

After the 2019 season Mjelde decide to retire. In January 2020 he was hired as director of development for Arna-Bjørnar. After Thomas Mørk left the club in December 2023, he was appointed as manager for the 2024 season together with Martin Haugen.

== Personal life ==
He is brother of Maren Mjelde, who plays for the Norway national team.

== Career statistics ==
=== Club ===
As of match played 20 October 2019

Appearances and goals by club, season and competition
Club	Season	League			National cup		Europe		Total	
Club	Season	Division	Apps	Goals	Apps	Goals	Apps	Goals	Apps	Goals
Brann	2002	Tippeligaen	4	0	0	0	–		4	0
Løv-Ham	2005	Adeccoligaen	25	2	3	0	–		25	2
Sandefjord	2006	Tippeligaen	21	3	6	0	–		27	3
Sandefjord	2007	Tippeligaen	13	0	2	1	–		15	1
Sandefjord	2008	Adeccoligaen	25	9	0	0	–		25	9
Sandefjord	2009	Tippeligaen	29	11	1	0	–		30	11
Sandefjord	Total		88	23	9	1	0	0	97	24
Brann	2010	Tippeligaen	30	4	1	0	–		31	4
Brann	2011	Tippeligaen	28	7	7	1	–		35	8
Brann	2012	Tippeligaen	25	2	5	3	–		30	5
Brann	Total		83	13	13	4	0	0	96	17
Lillestrøm	2013	Tippeligaen	25	2	3	0	–		28	2
Lillestrøm	2014	Tippeligaen	19	2	4	5	–		23	7
Lillestrøm	Total		44	4	7	5	0	0	51	9
Sandefjord	2015	Tippeligaen	26	5	5	0	–		31	5
Sandefjord	2016	OBOS-ligaen	29	9	5	1	–		34	10
Sandefjord	2017	Eliteserien	17	2	1	0	–		18	2
Sandefjord	2018	Eliteserien	16	0	2	1	–		18	2
Sandefjord	2019	OBOS-ligaen	22	1	3	0	–		2t	1
Sandefjord	Total		110	17	16	2	0	0	126	19
Career total			354	59	48	12	0	0	402	71
