= Zsolt Korcsmár =

Hungarian footballer (born 1989)

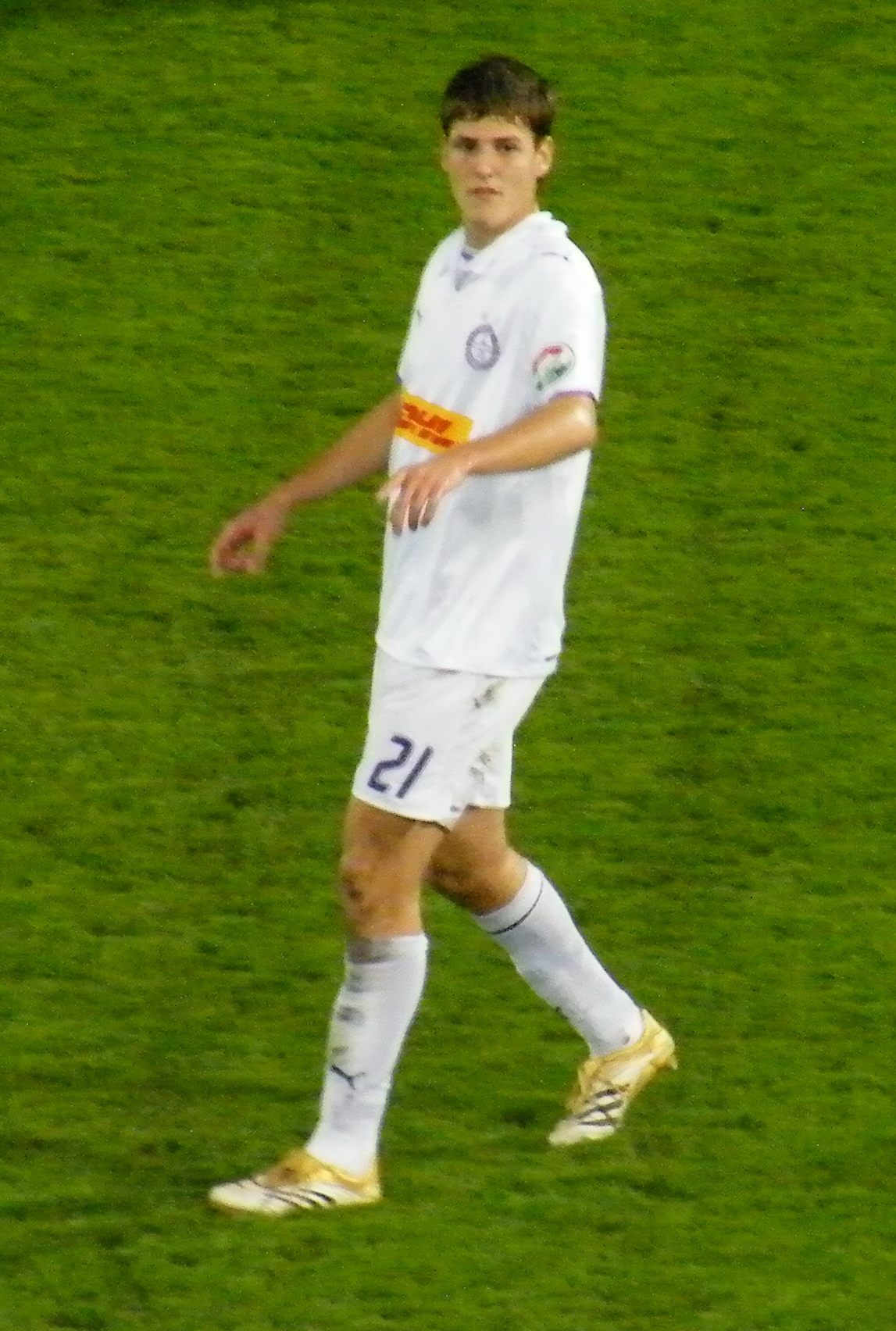

Personal information
- Date of birth: 9 January 1989 (age 37)
- Place of birth: Komló, Hungary
- Height: 1.89 m (6 ft 2 in)
- Positions: Centre-back; right-back

Team information
- Current team: Os TF (youth coach)

Youth career
- 1995–1998: Pécs Góliát FC
- 1998–2000: Komlói Góliát FC
- 2000–2002: Pécsi MFC
- 2002–2005: Újpest

Senior career*
Years	Team	Apps	(Gls)
2005–2011	Újpest	96	(12)
2010	→ Brann (loan)	10	(0)
2011–2013	Brann	69	(6)
2013–2016	Greuther Fürth	35	(1)
2016–2017	Vasas SC	37	(3)
2017–2020	Midtjylland	28	(2)
2020–2023	Os TF	10	(1)

International career
2007–2008	Hungary U19	8	(0)
2009	Hungary U20	5	(1)
2008–2010	Hungary U21	11	(2)
2011–2017	Hungary	26	(0)

Managerial career
- 2021–: Os TF (assistant)
- 2021–: Os TF (youth coach)
- * Club domestic league appearances and goals

Zsolt Korcsmár (Hungarian: [ˈʒolt ˈkort͡ʃmaːr]; born 9 January 1989) is a Hungarian professional footballer who plays as a centre-back and right-back.

== Club career ==
=== Újpest ===
Korcsmár played his first match in the Hungarian National Championship I against Budapest Honvéd FC in 2006. In the following season, he scored his first goal in the championship against Győri ETO FC. He joined Premier League side West Ham United for a two-week trial in December 2007. He played 96 matches and scored 12 goals in Újpest FC.

In the winter of 2010, Korcsmár tried out for several teams including SK Brann where he scored a goal in a friendly against Las Palmas. On 19 July 2010, Újpest FC and Brann announced that Korcsmár was loaned to SK Brann for the remainder of the 2010 season with an option for Brann to make the move permanent. The investment company Hardball helped Brann finance the transfer.

=== Brann ===
In January 2011, Korcsmár joined the Norwegian club SK Brann, where he played on loan from the Hungarian club Újpest FC. In his first season, Korcsmár played 811 minutes.

=== Greuther Fürth ===
It was officially confirmed on 14 May 2013 that Korcsmár would start the next season with German-side Greuther Fürth. He made his debut in the DFB-Pokal, against Pfeddersheim at an eventual 2–0 away win, where he scored the opening goal. On 30 August 2013, he made his debut in the 2. Bundesliga, against FSV Frankfurt at an eventual 1–1 away draw, where he played the full 90 minutes.

=== Vasas SC ===
He moved to Vasas SC on 1 February 2016.

== International career ==
Korcsmár was captain of Hungary under-21 national team. He was part of the Hungary U20 squad that won the bronze medal in the 2009 FIFA U-20 World Cup. He played his first international match for the Hungary national team against Iceland at the Puskás Ferenc Stadium in August 2011. The match ended 4–0.

== Career statistics ==
=== Club ===
As of 15 March 2015

Appearances and goals by club, season and competition
Season	Club	League			Cup		Total	
Season	Club	Division	Apps	Goals	Apps	Goals	Apps	Goals
Brann	2010	Tippeligaen	10	0	0	0	10	0
Brann	2011	Tippeligaen	28	3	5	1	32	4
Brann	2012	Tippeligaen	26	2	5	3	31	5
Brann	2013	Tippeligaen	15	1	2	0	17	1
Greuther Fürth	2013–14	2. Bundesliga	10	0	2	1	12	1
Greuther Fürth	2014–15	2. Bundesliga	20	1	0	0	0	0
Career total			109	7	14	5	123	12

=== International ===
Appearances and goals by national team and year
National team	Year	Apps	Goals
Hungary	2011	5	0
Hungary	2012	9	0
Hungary	2013	8	0
Hungary	2014	2	0
Hungary	2015	0	0
Hungary	2016	0	0
Hungary	2017	2	0
Total		26	0

== Honours ==
- FIFA U-20 World Cup: third place 2009
