= 2020 Sandefjord Fotball season =

Sandefjord
2020 season
- President: Roger Gulliksen
- Manager: Martí Cifuentes
- Stadium: Sandefjord Arena
- Eliteserien: 11th
- Norwegian Cup: Canceled due to the COVID-19 pandemic
- Top goalscorer: League: Two Players (7); All: Two Players (7)
Home colours	Away colours	Third colours

The 2020 season was Sandefjord's first season back in the Eliteserien following their relegation to the 1. divisjon at the end of the 2018 season.

== Season events ==
On 12 June, the Norwegian Football Federation announced that a maximum of 200 home fans would be allowed to attend the upcoming seasons matches.

On 10 September, the Norwegian Football Federation cancelled the 2020 Norwegian Cup due to the COVID-19 pandemic in Norway.

On 30 September, the Minister of Culture and Gender Equality, Abid Raja, announced that clubs would be able to have crowds of 600 at games from 12 October.

On 28 November, Sandefjord's match against Odd on 29 November was postponed due to a positive COVID-19 case within the Odd squad and the whole squad having to quarantine.

== Squad ==
Note: Flags indicate national team as defined under FIFA eligibility rules; some limited exceptions apply. Players may hold more than one non-FIFA nationality.

No.	Pos.	Nation	Player
1	GK	NOR	Jacob Storevik
2	DF	NOR	Lars Grorud (captain)
3	DF	AND	Marc Vales
4	MF	ESP	Enric Vallès (vice captain)
5	DF	AUT	Martin Kreuzriegler
6	MF	ISL	Emil Pálsson
7	FW	ESP	Marcos Celorrio
8	MF	BRA	Zé Eduardo
9	FW	NOR	Sivert Gussiås
10	FW	ESP	Rufo
11	MF	NOR	Kristoffer Normann Hansen
13	DF	NOR	Lars Markmanrud
14	MF	NOR	Stefan Mladenovic

No.	Pos.	Nation	Player
15	MF	NOR	Erik Brenden
16	MF	NOR	Sander Risan
17	DF	NOR	Sander Moen Foss
18	MF	SWE	William Kurtovic
19	DF	NOR	Brice Wembangomo
20	FW	NOR	George Gibson
21	DF	SWE	Anton Kralj
22	FW	CRC	Deyver Vega
23	DF	ISL	Viðar Jónsson
24	MF	NOR	Harmeet Singh
25	MF	NOR	Henrik Falchener
31	MF	NOR	Peder Meen Johansen
99	GK	NOR	Jesper Granlund

=== Out on loan ===
Note: Flags indicate national team as defined under FIFA eligibility rules; some limited exceptions apply. Players may hold more than one non-FIFA nationality.

No.	Pos.	Nation	Player
22	DF	NOR	Herman Solberg Nilsen (at Kongsvinger until 31 December 2020)
24	MF	NOR	Martin Andersen (at Fram Larvik until 31 December 2020)

== Transfers ==
=== In ===
Date	Position	Nationality	Name	From	Fee	Ref.
8 January 2020	FW	(Norway)	Sivert Gussiås	Molde	Undisclosed	
16 January 2020	MF	(Norway)	Kristoffer Normann Hansen	Ull/Kisa	Undisclosed	
10 March 2020	MF	(Brazil)	Zé Eduardo	Wil	Undisclosed	
13 January 2020	MF	(Norway)	Erik Brenden	Lillestrøm	Undisclosed	
18 June 2020	FW	(Spain)	Marcos Celorrio	Real Sociedad B	Undisclosed	
25 June 2020	DF	(Austria)	Martin Kreuzriegler	Blau-Weiß Linz	Undislcosed	
10 September 2020	FW	(Costa Rica)	Deyver Vega	Vålerenga	Free	
15 September 2020	DF	(Norway)	Mats Haakenstad	KuPS	Undisclosed	
18 September 2020	MF	(Norway)	Harmeet Singh	HJK	Free	

=== Out ===
Date	Position	Nationality	Name	To	Fee	Ref.
10 January 2020	MF	(Norway)	Mohamed Ofkir	Sarpsborg 08	Undisclosed	
13 January 2020	MF	(Norway)	Ole Breistøl	Ull/Kisa	Undisclosed	
17 January 2020	FW	(Sweden)	Pontus Engblom	GIF Sundsvall	Undisclosed	
16 February 2020	GK	(Finland)	Walter Viitala	SJK	Undisclosed	
27 May 2020	DF	(Norway)	Marius Høibråten	Bodø/Glimt	Undisclosed	

=== Released ===
Date	Position	Nationality	Name	Joined	Date
4 November 2019	MF	(Norway)	Håvard Storbæk	Retired	
5 November 2019	MF	(Norway)	Erik Mjelde	Retired	
31 December 2019	MF	(Spain)	Tito		
31 December 2019	MF	(Norway)	Jakob Dunsby		

== Friendlies ==
6 June 2020	Sarpsborg 08	3–1	Sandefjord	Sarpsborg
13:00 CEST (UTC+2)		Report		Stadium: Sarpsborg Stadion

10 June 2020	Sandefjord	0–0	Mjøndalen	Sandefjord
18:00 CEST (UTC+2)		Report		Stadium: Sandefjord Arena

== Competitions ==
=== Eliteserien ===
==== Results summary ====
Overall								Home						Away					
Pld	W	D	L	GF	GA	GD	Pts	W	D	L	GF	GA	GD	W	D	L	GF	GA	GD
30	9	8	13	31	43	−12	35	3	7	5	13	20	−7	6	1	8	18	23	−5

Last updated: 22 December 2020.
Source: Results

==== Results by round ====
Round	1	2	3	4	5	6	7	8	9	10	11	12	13	14	15	16	17	18	19	20	21	22	23	24	25	26	27	28	29	30
Ground	A	H	A	H	A	H	A	H	A	H	A	H	A	H	A	H	A	H	A	A	H	A	H	H	A	A	H	A	H	H
Result	W	D	L	L	L	L	L	W	L	W	L	W	W	L	L	L	W	D	W	L	L	W	D	D	L	W	D	D	D	D
Position	4	4	8	11	13	13	14	13	14	13	13	12	9	11	13	13	13	13	11	12	13	11	11	11	11	11	11	11	10	11

Updated to match(es) played on 22 December 2020. Source: Results
A = Away; H = Home; W = Win; D = Draw; L = Loss

==== Results ====
16 June 2020 1	Odd	1–2	Sandefjord	Skien
18:00 CEST (UTC+2)	Ruud (yellow card) 31'; Børven 90+3' (pen.)	Report	Jónsson (yellow card) 32'; Pálsson (yellow card) 68'; Nordkvelle 83' (o.g.); Gussiås 90+1'	Stadium: Skagerak Arena; Attendance: 200; Referee: Ola Hobber Nilsen

21 June 2020 2	Sandefjord	2–2	Start	Sandefjord
18:00 CEST (UTC+2)	Grorud 24' (yellow card) 65'; Foss (yellow card) 36'; Gibson (yellow card) 52'; Rufo 55'	Report	Bringaker 14' (yellow card) 54'; Daland 45'; Skålevik (yellow card) 57'	Stadium: Sandefjord Arena; Attendance: 200; Referee: Mohammad Aslam

24 June 2020 3	Stabæk	2–0	Sandefjord	Bærum
18:00 CEST (UTC+2)	Hanche-Olsen 30'; Hansen (yellow card) 36'; Vetlesen 82'	Report	Brenden (yellow card) 24'; Pálsson (yellow card) 48' (yellow-red card) 59'; Rufo (yellow card) 56'	Stadium: Nadderud Stadion; Attendance: 200; Referee: Tommy Skjerven

28 June 2020 4	Sandefjord	0–1	Haugesund	Sandefjord
18:00 CEST (UTC+2)	Rufo (yellow card) 70'	Report	Velde 15'	Stadium: Sandefjord Arena; Attendance: 200; Referee: Tom Harald Hagen

1 July 2020 5	Viking	2–0	Sandefjord	Stavanger
18:00 CEST (UTC+2)	Løkberg 56'; Berisha 60'; Austbø (yellow card) 90+3'	Report	Jónsson (yellow card) 20'; Grorud (yellow card) 32'	Stadium: Viking Stadion; Attendance: 200; Referee: Rohit Saggi

5 July 2020 6	Sandefjord	0–3	Sarpsborg 08	Sandefjord
18:00 CEST (UTC+2)	Jónsson (yellow card) 81'; Johansen (yellow card) 83'	Report	Coulibaly 15' (yellow card) 67'; Utvik (yellow card) 18'; Larsen 29'; Bojang (yellow card) 40'; Soltvedt 80'	Stadium: Sandefjord Arena; Attendance: 200; Referee: Kai Erik Steen

12 July 2020 7	Brann	3–1	Sandefjord	Bergen
20:30 CEST (UTC+2)	Taylor 7'; Koomson 9', 12'; Forren (yellow card) 10'; Ahamada (yellow card) 23'; Acosta (yellow card) 41'; Ordagić (yellow card) 50'	Report	Rufo (penalty missed) 20'; Celorrio 22' (pen.); Kurtovic (yellow card) 51'; Jónsson (yellow card) 81'	Stadium: Brann Stadion; Attendance: 200; Referee: Rohit Saggi

15 July 2020 8	Sandefjord	1–0	Aalesund	Sandefjord
18:00 CEST (UTC+2)	Kralj (yellow card) 27'; Foss 37'; Brenden (yellow card) 87'; Hansen (yellow card) 88'	Report	Sno (yellow card) 80'	Stadium: Sandefjord Arena; Attendance: 0 Referee: Sivert Amland

19 July 2020 9	Rosenborg	2–1	Sandefjord	Trondheim
18:00 CEST (UTC+2)	Tagseth (yellow card) 7'; Zachariassen 15', 73'; Helland (yellow card) 64'; Hovland (yellow card) 65'	Report	Pálsson (yellow card) 48'; Rufo 80'; Brenden (yellow card) 85'	Stadium: Lerkendal Stadion; Attendance: 200; Referee: Tore Hansen

26 July 2020 10	Sandefjord	1–0	Mjøndalen	Sandefjord
18:00 CEST (UTC+2)	Markmanrud (yellow card) 31'; Vales (yellow card) 50'; Brenden 64'	Report	Ibrahim (yellow card) 42'	Stadium: Sandefjord Arena; Attendance: 200; Referee: Ola Hobber Nilsen

29 July 2020 11	Kristiansund	3–1	Sandefjord	Kristiansund
18:00 CEST (UTC+2)	Bye 72'; Skarsem (yellow card) 75'; Pellegrino 83'	Report	Gussiås 5'; Vales (yellow card) 25'; Markmanrud (yellow card) 56'; Mørk (yellow card) 78'	Stadium: Kristiansund Stadion; Attendance: 200; Referee: Svein Oddvar Moen

1 August 2020 12	Sandefjord	2–1	Molde	Sandefjord
18:00 CEST (UTC+2)	Rufo 18'; Pálsson (yellow card) 27'; Vales (yellow card) 57' (goal) 90+2' (pen.); Brenden (yellow card) 74'; Grorud (yellow card) 85'	Report	Brynhildsen 14'; Sjølstad (yellow card) 29' (yellow-red card) 41'; Sinyan (yellow card) 67'; James (yellow card) 68'	Stadium: Sandefjord Arena; Attendance: 200; Referee: Mohammad Aslam

9 August 2020 13	Strømsgodset	3–4	Sandefjord	Drammen
18:00 CEST (UTC+2)	Hove 18'; Salvesen (yellow card) 28' (goal) 52'; Maigaard 54' (pen.) (penalty missed) 66'; Gunnarsson (yellow card) 63'	Report	Rufo 6'; Kurtovic (yellow card) 16'; Gussiås 45+1', 63' (pen.); Kreuzriegler (yellow card) 55' (yellow-red card) 90+3'; Hansen 90+4'	Stadium: Marienlyst Stadion; Attendance: 200; Referee: Kristoffer Hagenes

16 August 2020 14	Sandefjord	1–2	Bodø/Glimt	Sandefjord
18:00 CEST (UTC+2)	Rufo (yellow card) 40'; Gussiås 49'; Vales (yellow card) 60' Kurtovic (yellow card) 77'	Report	Boniface 16' (yellow card) 87'; Saltnes 78'	Stadium: Sandefjord Arena; Attendance: 200; Referee: Dag Vidar Hafsås

22 August 2020 15	Vålerenga	2–1	Sandefjord	Oslo
18:00 CEST (UTC+2)	Vilhjálmsson (yellow card) 54'; Bjørdal (yellow card) 76'; Finne 83', 89'	Report	Gussiås 10' (yellow card) 90'	Stadium: Intility Arena; Attendance: 200; Referee: Rohit Saggi

30 August 2020 16	Sandefjord	0–2	Kristiansund	Sandefjord
18:00 CEST (UTC+2)	Vallès (yellow card) 44'; Gussiås (yellow card) 69'	Report	Pellegrino 37' (pen.), 85'; Kastrati (yellow card) 45+1'; Kalludra (yellow card) 56'; Moumbagna (yellow card) 67'	Stadium: Sandefjord Arena; Attendance: 200; Referee: Marius Hansen Grøtta

13 September 2020 17	Mjøndalen	0–2	Sandefjord	Mjøndalen
18:00 CEST (UTC+2)	Liseth (yellow card) 2'; Nakkim (penalty missed) 14' (yellow card) 32'; Johansen (yellow card) 76'; Larsen (yellow card) 85'	Report	Jónsson (yellow card) 27' (goal) 33'; Grorud (yellow card) 45'; Gussiås 53'; Pálsson (yellow card) 72'; Celorrio (yellow card) 90+5'	Stadium: Consto Arena; Attendance: 200; Referee: Sigurd Smehus Kringstad

20 September 2020 18	Sandefjord	0–0	Strømsgodset	Sandefjord
18:00 CEST (UTC+2)		Report		Stadium: Sandefjord Arena; Attendance: 200; Referee: Tore Hansen

26 September 2020 19	Molde	0–1	Sandefjord	Molde
18:00 CEST (UTC+2)	Haugen (yellow card) 24'; Brynhildsen (yellow card) 29'; Ellingsen (yellow card) 34'; Sinyan (yellow card) 66'; Hestad (yellow card) 89'	Report	Vales 6' (yellow card) 59'; Vallès (yellow card) 84'	Stadium: Aker Stadion; Attendance: 200; Referee: Rohit Saggi

4 October 2020 20	Bodø/Glimt	2–1	Sandefjord	Bodø
19:00 CEST (UTC+2)	Fet 1'; Saltnes 29'	Report	Markmanrud 39'	Stadium: Aspmyra Stadion; Attendance: 200; Referee: Kristoffer Hagenes

18 October 2020 21	Sandefjord	0–3	Vålerenga	Sandefjord
20:30 CEST (UTC+2)	Kreuzriegler (yellow card) 78'; Wembangomo (yellow card) 90+1'	Report	Kjartansson 20', 68' (penalty missed) 48'; Dønnum 87'	Stadium: Sandefjord Arena; Attendance: 600; Referee: Tommy Skjerven

24 October 2020 22	Start	0–1	Sandefjord	Kristiansand
18:00 CEST (UTC+2)		Report	Vega (yellow card) 48'; Singh 52'; Vallès (yellow card) 58'	Stadium: Sør Arena; Attendance: 600; Referee: Ola Hobber Nilsen

1 November 2020 23	Sandefjord	3–3	Brann	Sandefjord
18:00 CET (UTC+1)	Kreuzriegler 18'; Singh 60'; Jónsson 63'; Pálsson (yellow card) 70'	Report	Pedersen (yellow card) 33'; Taylor 60'; Strand 68'; Haugen 90+5'	Stadium: Sandefjord Arena; Attendance: 600; Referee: Mohammad Usman Aslam

8 November 2020 24	Sandefjord	0–0	Stabæk	Sandefjord
18:00 CET (UTC+1)	Mørk (yellow card) 90+1'	Report	Solheim (yellow card) 38'; Jonassen (yellow card) 55'	Stadium: Sandefjord Arena; Attendance: 600; Referee: Marius Hansen Grøtta

22 November 2020 25	Haugesund	3–2	Sandefjord	Haugesund
18:00 CET (UTC+1)	B.Hansen 16'; Koné 33'; Velde (penalty missed) 37' 90'; Leite (yellow card) 64'	Report	K.Hansen 21'; Vega (yellow card) 29'; Haakenstad (yellow card) 37'; Rufo 62' (yellow card) 90+6'; Singh (yellow card) 64' (yellow-red card) 72'	Stadium: Haugesund Stadion; Attendance: 600; Referee: Sivert Amland

2 December 2020 27	Aalesund	0–1	Sandefjord	Ålesund
18:00 CET (UTC+1)	Klinkenberg (yellow card) 15'; Grønner (yellow card) 54'; Haugen (yellow card) 58'	Report	Vega 34'; Mørk (yellow card) 89'	Stadium: Color Line Stadion; Attendance: 600; Referee: Marius Hansen Grøtta

6 December 2020 28	Sandefjord	2–2	Viking	Sandefjord
17:00 CET (UTC+1)	Rufo 25', 73'	Report	Berisha 76', 89'	Stadium: Sandefjord Arena; Attendance: 0 Referee: Mohammad Usman Aslam

9 December 2020 29	Sarpsborg 08	0–0	Sandefjord	Sarpsborg
18:00 CET (UTC+1)	Halvorsen (yellow card) 10' (yellow-red card) 56'	Report	Rufo (yellow card) 8'; Wembangomo (yellow card) 20'; Kralj (yellow card) 35'; Vega (yellow card) 37'; Haakenstad (yellow card) 79'; Hansen (yellow card) 88'	Stadium: Sarpsborg Stadion; Attendance: 600; Referee: Kristoffer Hagenes

13 December 2020 26	Sandefjord	1–1	Odd	Sandefjord
18:00 CET (UTC+1)	Pálsson (yellow card) 44'; Vales 84'	Report	Bakenga (yellow card) 18' (goal) 54'; Ruud (penalty missed) 49'; Bjørtuft (yellow card) 90'	Stadium: Sandefjord Arena; Attendance: 600; Referee: Marius Hansen Grøtta
Note: Match originally scheduled for 29 November, but postponed on 28 November due to the COVID-19 pandemic.

22 December 2020 30	Sandefjord	0–0	Rosenborg	Sandefjord
18:00 CET (UTC+1)	Kreuzriegler (yellow card) 55'; Grorud (yellow card) 58'; Hansen (yellow card) 89'	Report		Stadium: Sandefjord Arena; Attendance: 600; Referee: Rohit Saggi

==== Table ====
Pos	Team	Pld	W	D	L	GF	GA	GD	Pts
9	Haugesund	30	11	6	13	39	51	−12	39
10	Brann	30	9	9	12	40	49	−9	36
11	Sandefjord	30	9	8	13	31	43	−12	35
12	Sarpsborg 08	30	8	8	14	33	43	−10	32
13	Strømsgodset	30	7	10	13	41	57	−16	31

Source: Football Association of Norway (in Norwegian)
Rules for classification: 1) Points; 2) Goal difference; 3) Goals scored; 4) Head-to-head points; 5) Head-to-head goal difference; 6) Head-to-head away goals scored (only if between two teams); 7) Head-to-head goals scored; 8) Play-off (only used to decide champions or relegation).

=== Norwegian Cup ===
2020 First round	–
CEST (UTC+2)
Note: Cup cancelled on 10 September due to the COVID-19 pandemic in Norway.

== Squad statistics ==
As of match played 22 December 2020

=== Appearances and goals ===
No.	Pos	Nat	Player	Total		Eliteserien		Norwegian Cup	
No.	Pos	Nat	Player	Apps	Goals	Apps	Goals	Apps	Goals
1	GK	(Norway) NOR	Jacob Storevik	30	0	30	0	0	0
2	DF	(Norway) NOR	Lars Grorud	22	1	18+4	1	0	0
3	DF	(Andorra) AND	Marc Vales	24	3	19+5	3	0	0
4	MF	(Spain) ESP	Enric Vallès	14	0	13+1	0	0	0
5	DF	(Austria) AUT	Martin Kreuzriegler	25	1	22+3	1	0	0
6	MF	(Iceland) ISL	Emil Pálsson	24	0	18+6	0	0	0
7	FW	(Spain) ESP	Marcos Celorrio	13	1	4+9	1	0	0
8	MF	(Brazil) BRA	Zé Eduardo	4	0	1+3	0	0	0
9	FW	(Norway) NOR	Sivert Gussiås	30	7	23+7	7	0	0
10	FW	(Spain) ESP	Rufo	27	7	21+6	7	0	0
11	MF	(Norway) NOR	Kristoffer Normann Hansen	25	2	15+10	2	0	0
12	DF	(Norway) NOR	Mats Haakenstad	9	0	5+4	0	0	0
13	DF	(Norway) NOR	Lars Markmanrud	22	1	16+6	1	0	0
14	MF	(Norway) NOR	Stefan Mladenovic	2	0	0+2	0	0	0
15	MF	(Norway) NOR	Erik Brenden	25	1	10+15	1	0	0
16	MF	(Norway) NOR	Sander Risan	12	0	5+7	0	0	0
17	DF	(Norway) NOR	Sander Moen Foss	20	1	13+7	1	0	0
18	MF	(Sweden) SWE	William Kurtovic	19	0	16+3	0	0	0
19	DF	(Norway) NOR	Brice Wembangomo	18	0	18	0	0	0
20	FW	(Norway) NOR	George Gibson	16	0	4+12	0	0	0
21	DF	(Sweden) SWE	Anton Kralj	22	0	18+4	0	0	0
22	FW	(Costa Rica) CRC	Deyver Vega	14	1	12+2	1	0	0
23	DF	(Iceland) ISL	Viðar Jónsson	27	2	20+7	2	0	0
24	MF	(Norway) NOR	Harmeet Singh	9	2	6+3	2	0	0
25	MF	(Norway) NOR	Henrik Falchener	1	0	0+1	0	0	0
31	MF	(Norway) NOR	Peder Meen Johansen	7	0	3+4	0	0	0
Players away from Sandefjord on loan:
Players who left Sandefjord during the season

=== Goal scorers ===
Place	Position	Nation	Number	Name	Eliteserien	Norwegian Cup	Total
1	FW	(Norway)	9	Sivert Gussiås	7	0	7
1	FW	(Spain)	10	Rufo	7	0	7
3	DF	(Andorra)	3	Marc Vales	3	0	3
4	MF	(Norway)	24	Harmeet Singh	2	0	2
4	DF	(Iceland)	23	Viðar Jónsson	2	0	2
4	MF	(Norway)	11	Kristoffer Normann Hansen	2	0	2
7	FW	(Norway)	2	Lars Grorud	1	0	1
7	FW	(Spain)	7	Marcos Celorrio	1	0	1
7	DF	(Norway)	17	Sander Moen Foss	1	0	1
7	MF	(Norway)	15	Erik Brenden	1	0	1
7	DF	(Norway)	13	Lars Markmanrud	1	0	1
7	DF	(Austria)	5	Martin Kreuzriegler	1	0	1
7	FW	(Costa Rica)	22	Deyver Vega	1	0	1
7				Own goal	1	0	1
				TOTALS	31	0	31

=== Clean sheets ===
Place	Position	Nation	Number	Name	Eliteserien	Norwegian Cup	Total
1	GK	(Norway)	1	Jacob Storevik	9	0	9
				TOTALS	9	0	9

=== Disciplinary record ===
Number	Nation	Position	Name	Eliteserien		Norwegian Cup		Total	
Number	Nation	Position	Name	Booked	Sent off (straight red)	Booked	Sent off (straight red)	Booked	Sent off (straight red)
2	(Norway)	DF	Lars Grorud	5	0	0	0	5	0
3	(Andorra)	DF	Marc Vales	5	0	0	0	5	0
4	(Spain)	MF	Enric Vallès	3	0	0	0	3	0
5	(Austria)	DF	Martin Kreuzriegler	4	1	0	0	4	1
6	(Iceland)	MF	Emil Pálsson	8	1	0	0	8	1
7	(Spain)	FW	Marcos Celorrio	1	0	0	0	1	0
9	(Norway)	FW	Sivert Gussiås	2	0	0	0	2	0
10	(Spain)	FW	Rufo	5	0	0	0	5	0
11	(Norway)	MF	Kristoffer Hansen	3	0	0	0	3	0
12	(Norway)	DF	Mats Haakenstad	2	0	0	0	2	0
13	(Norway)	DF	Lars Markmanrud	1	0	0	0	1	0
15	(Norway)	MF	Erik Brenden	4	0	0	0	4	0
16	(Norway)	MF	Sander Risan	3	0	0	0	3	0
17	(Norway)	DF	Sander Moen Foss	1	0	0	0	1	0
18	(Sweden)	MF	William Kurtovic	3	0	0	0	3	0
19	(Norway)	DF	Brice Wembangomo	2	0	0	0	2	0
20	(Norway)	FW	George Gibson	1	0	0	0	1	0
21	(Sweden)	DF	Anton Kralj	2	0	0	0	2	0
22	(Costa Rica)	FW	Deyver Vega	3	0	0	0	3	0
23	(Iceland)	DF	Viðar Jónsson	5	0	0	0	5	0
24	(Norway)	MF	Harmeet Singh	2	1	0	0	2	1
31	(Norway)	MF	Peder Meen Johansen	1	0	0	0	1	0
Players who left Sandefjord during the season:
			TOTALS	66	3	0	0	66	3
