= 2021 Sandefjord Fotball season =

Sandefjord
2021 season
- Chairman: Gunnar Bjønness
- Head coach(es): Hans Erik Ødegaard; Andreas Tegström
- Stadium: Release Arena
- Eliteserien: 10th
- Norwegian Cup: Second Round vs Arendal
- Top goalscorer: League: Viðar Jónsson (11); All: Viðar Jónsson (13)
Home colours	Away colours	Third colours

The 2021 season is Sandefjord's second season in the Eliteserien following their promotion from the 1. divisjon at the end of the 2019 season.

== Squad ==
Note: Flags indicate national team as defined under FIFA eligibility rules; some limited exceptions apply. Players may hold more than one non-FIFA nationality.

No.	Pos.	Nation	Player
1	GK	NOR	Jacob Storevik (4th captain)
2	DF	NOR	Brice Wembangomo (3rd captain)
3	DF	AND	Marc Vales (vice-captain)
4	DF	NED	Ian Smeulers
5	DF	AUT	Martin Kreuzriegler
6	MF	NOR	Sander Risan
8	MF	BRA	Zé Eduardo
9	FW	NOR	Sivert Gussiås
10	FW	CRC	Deyver Vega
11	MF	NOR	Kristoffer Normann Hansen
12	DF	NOR	Mats Haakenstad
13	DF	NOR	Lars Markmanrud
14	FW	NOR	Alexander Ruud Tveter
15	MF	NOR	Erik Brenden
16	MF	NOR	André Sødlund

No.	Pos.	Nation	Player
17	DF	NOR	Sander Moen Foss
18	MF	SWE	William Kurtovic
19	MF	BIH	Amer Ordagić
20	FW	NOR	Franklin Nyenetue
21	MF	NOR	Peder Meen Johansen
22	MF	NOR	Moussa Njie
23	MF	ISL	Viðar Jónsson
24	MF	NOR	Harmeet Singh (captain)
25	DF	NOR	Henrik Falchener
29	DF	NOR	Jørgen Kili Fjeldskår
40	MF	NOR	Vetle Walle Egeli
54	GK	NOR	Andreas Albertsen
93	FW	NOR	Chuma Anene
99	GK	NOR	Jesper Granlund

=== Out on loan ===
Note: Flags indicate national team as defined under FIFA eligibility rules; some limited exceptions apply. Players may hold more than one non-FIFA nationality.

No.	Pos.	Nation	Player
22	DF	NOR	Herman Solberg Nilsen (at Fram Larvik until 31 December 2020)

== Transfers ==
=== Winter ===
Note: Flags indicate national team as defined under FIFA eligibility rules; some limited exceptions apply. Players may hold more than one non-FIFA nationality.

No.	Pos.	Nation	Player
14	FW	NOR	Alexander Ruud Tveter (from Free agent)
16	MF	NOR	André Sødlund (from (Norway) Sandnes Ulf)
19	MF	BIH	Amer Ordagić (from (Norway) Brann)
20	FW	NOR	Franklin Nyenetue (from (Norway) Stjørdals-Blink)
22	DF	NOR	Herman Solberg Nilsen (loan return from (Norway) Kongsvinger)
92	GK	DEN	Frederik Due (from (United States) Orange County)

Out: Note: Flags indicate national team as defined under FIFA eligibility rules; some limited exceptions apply. Players may hold more than one non-FIFA nationality.

No.	Pos.	Nation	Player
2	DF	NOR	Lars Grorud (retired)
6	MF	ISL	Emil Pálsson (to (Norway) Sarpsborg 08)
10	FW	ESP	Rufo (to (Denmark) Aalborg)
14	MF	NOR	Stefan Mladenovic (to (Norway) Arendal)
20	FW	NOR	George Gibson (released)
21	DF	SWE	Anton Kralj (to (Sweden) Degerfors)
22	FW	CRC	Deyver Vega (to (Romania) Politehnica Iași)
22	DF	NOR	Herman Solberg Nilsen (on loan to (Norway) Fram Larvik)

=== Summer ===
In: Note: Flags indicate national team as defined under FIFA eligibility rules; some limited exceptions apply. Players may hold more than one non-FIFA nationality.

No.	Pos.	Nation	Player
4	DF	NED	Ian Smeulers (from (Netherlands) Jong Feyenoord)
10	FW	CRC	Deyver Vega (free transfer)
22	FW	NOR	Moussa Njie (free transfer)
40	MF	NOR	Vetle Walle Egeli (promoted from junior squad)
93	FW	NOR	Chuma Anene (from (Denmark) Midtjylland)

Out: Note: Flags indicate national team as defined under FIFA eligibility rules; some limited exceptions apply. Players may hold more than one non-FIFA nationality.

No.	Pos.	Nation	Player
4	DF	ESP	Enric Vallès (to (Spain) UE Olot)
22	DF	NOR	Herman Solberg Nilsen (on loan to Fram Larvik)
24	MF	NOR	Martin Andersen (released)
92	GK	DEN	Frederik Due (released)

== Friendlies ==
17 April 2021	Odd	0–0	Sandefjord	Skien
16:00 CEST (UTC+2)		Report		Stadium: Skagerak Arena; Referee: Marius Lien

21 April 2021	Mjøndalen	4–0	Sandefjord	Mjøndalen
13:00 CEST (UTC+2)	Solholm Johansen 19'; Brochmann 39' (pen.); Stavås Skistad 44'; Bækken 69'	Report		Stadium: Consto Arena; Referee: Espen Eskås

26 April 2021	Strømsgodset	1–0	Sandefjord	Drammen
14:00 CEST (UTC+2)	Enersen 37'	Report		Stadium: Marienlyst stadion Referee: Harald Sletner

2 May 2021	Start	1–1	Sandefjord	Kristiansand
15:00 CEST (UTC+2)	Daland 50'	Report	Sødlund 62'	Stadium: Sparebanken Sør Arena; Referee: Tore Hansen

== Competitions ==
=== Eliteserien ===
==== Results summary ====
Overall								Home						Away					
Pld	W	D	L	GF	GA	GD	Pts	W	D	L	GF	GA	GD	W	D	L	GF	GA	GD
30	10	6	14	38	52	−14	36	6	5	4	21	18	+3	4	1	10	17	34	−17

Last updated: 15 December 2021.
Source: see below

==== Results by round ====
Round	1	2	3	4	5	6	7	8	9	10	11	12	13	14	15	16	17	18	19	20	21	22	23	24	25	26	27	28	29	30
Ground	A	H	A	H	A	H	H	A	H	A	H	A	H	H	A	H	A	H	A	H	A	H	A	H	A	A	H	A	H	A
Result	L	W	L	L	L	W	L	W	W	W	L	D	W	D	L	D	L	W	D	L	L	D	L	W	L	L	D	W	W	L
Position	15	10	11	14	10	11	13	11	12	10	8	7	9	9	10	11	11	10	10	11	11	11	12	11	13	13	13	11	9	10

Updated to match(es) played on 15 December 2021. Source: see below
A = Away; H = Home; W = Win; D = Draw; L = Loss

==== Results ====
16 May 2021 3	Sandefjord	0–3	Mjøndalen	Sandefjord
18:00 CEST (UTC+2)	Sødlund (penalty missed) 40'; Kreuzriegler (yellow card) 71'	Report	Brochmann 6'; Aasmundsen (yellow card) 52'; Nakkim (yellow card) 57'; Brochmann (yellow card) 73'; Larsen 77'; Nakkim (penalty missed) 88'; Nakkim 89' (pen.)	Stadium: Release Arena; Attendance: 600; Referee: Sivert Amland

24 May 2021 4	Tromsø	1–3	Sandefjord	Tromsø
18:00 CEST (UTC+2)	Gundersen (yellow card) 36'; Berntsen (yellow card) 45'; Mikkelsen 49'; Totland (yellow card) 69'	Report	Moen Foss 13'; Wembangomo (yellow card) 37'; Jónsson 42'; Brenden (yellow card) 74'; Normann Hansen 81'	Stadium: Alfheim Stadion; Attendance: 600; Referee: Mohammad Usman Aslam

27 May 2021 5	Sandefjord	1–2	Rosenborg	Sandefjord
18:00 CEST (UTC+2)	Normann Hansen 51'; Vales (yellow card) 82'	Report	Hovland 35'; Islamovic (yellow card) 87'; Molins 90'	Stadium: Release Arena; Attendance: 600; Referee: Ola Hobber Nilsen

30 May 2021 6	Vålerenga	3–1	Sandefjord	Oslo
18:00 CEST (UTC+2)	Tollås Nation 39'; Layouni 61'; Dønnum (yellow card) 64' (goal) 70' (pen.)	Report	Moen Foss (yellow card) 28' (goal) 67'; Vales (yellow card) 64'	Stadium: Intility Arena; Attendance: 50; Referee: Kristoffer Hagenes

12 June 2021 7	Sandefjord	1–3	Molde	Sandefjord
15:00 CEST (UTC+2)	Haugen 16' (o.g.); Vales (yellow card) 71'	Report	Haugen 3', 69'; Omoijuanfo 34'	Stadium: Sandefjord Arena; Attendance: 600; Referee: Rohit Saggi

19 June 2021 8	Sandefjord	3–0	Viking	Sandefjord
15:00 CEST (UTC+2)	Jónsson 35'; Normann Hansen 57'; Gussiås 90+4'	Report	Kabran (yellow card) 42'	Stadium: Release Arena; Attendance: 600; Referee: Ola Hobber Nilsen

24 June 2021 9	Strømsgodset	4–0	Sandefjord	Drammen
18:00 CEST (UTC+2)	Tchamba 16'; Hove 25'; Friday 33', 48'; Stengel (yellow card) 53'; Stenevik (yellow card) 77'; Mawa (penalty missed) 88'	Report	Wembangomo (yellow card) 39'; Singh (yellow card) 89'	Stadium: Marienlyst stadion Attendance: 2,000; Referee: Sigurd Smestad Kringstad

30 June 2021 10	Sandefjord	1–0	Bodø/Glimt	Sandefjord
18:00 CEST (UTC+2)	Ruud Tveter 51'; Kreuzriegler (yellow card) 66'	Report	Lindahl (yellow card) 83'	Stadium: Release Arena; Attendance: 2,000; Referee: Espen Eskås

4 July 2021 11	Stabæk	0–2	Sandefjord	Bærum
15:00 CEST (UTC+2)	Sabastine (yellow card) 86'	Report	Jónsson 9'; Ruud Tveter 59'; Kreuzriegler (yellow card) 64'	Stadium: Nadderud Stadion; Attendance: 1,109; Referee: Mohammad Usman Aslam

11 July 2021 12	Sandefjord	2–0	Sarpsborg 08	Sandefjord
18:00 CEST (UTC+2)	Jónsson 32'; Normann Hansen 68' (yellow card) 74'; Foss (yellow card) 72'	Report	Pálsson (yellow card) 43'; Halvorsen (yellow card) 62'	Stadium: Release Arena; Attendance: 2,000; Referee: Christian Moen

18 July 2021 13	Kristiansund	2–0	Sandefjord	Kristiansund
18:00 CEST (UTC+2)	Nilsen (yellow card) 33'; Hopmark (yellow card) 48'; Aasbak 55'; Kartum (yellow card) 72'; Fjeldskår 89' (o.g.)	Report	Zé Eduardo (yellow card) 14'	Stadium: Kristiansund Stadion; Attendance: 1,900; Referee: Tom Harald Hagen

21 July 2021 1	Sandefjord	1–1	Haugesund	Sandefjord
19:00 CEST (UTC+2)	Risan 23'; Zé Eduardo (yellow card) 63'	Report	Wadji (yellow card) 37'; Ruud Tveter 58' (o.g.)	Stadium: Release Arena; Attendance: 2,000; Referee: Marius Hansen Grøtta

28 July 2021 2	Odd	2–3	Sandefjord	Skien
19:00 CEST (UTC+2)	Storevik 36' (o.g.); Bjørtuft (yellow card) 49'; Larsen 88'	Report	Risan 2'; Ruud Tveter 44'; Jónsson 50'; Foss (yellow card) 64'	Stadium: Skagerak Arena; Attendance: 1,850; Referee: Tom Harald Hagen

8 August 2021 14	Sandefjord	1–1	Lillestrøm	Sandefjord
18:00 CEST (UTC+2)	Kurtovic (yellow card) 9'; Jónsson 50'	Report	Ranger (yellow card) 11'; Lehne Olsen 59'; Edh (yellow card) 90+5'	Stadium: Release Arena; Attendance: 2,000; Referee: Tore Hansen

15 August 2021 15	Brann	3–2	Sandefjord	Bergen
20:00 CEST (UTC+2)	Pedersen 18'; Heltne Nilsen (yellow card) 28'; Heggebø 49'; Taylor 78' (pen.); Pallesen Knudsen (yellow card) 89'	Report	Normann Hansen 29', 42'; Singh (yellow card) 49'	Stadium: Brann Stadion; Attendance: 4,512; Referee: Rohit Saggi

22 August 2021 16	Sandefjord	1–1	Tromsø	Sandefjord
18:00 CEST (UTC+2)	Jónsson 12'; Wembangomo (yellow card) 80'; Gussiås (penalty missed) 88'	Report	Ebiye 17'; Amundsen (yellow card) 41'; A. Jenssen (yellow card) 89'	Stadium: Release Arena; Attendance: 2,000; Referee: Sigurd Smestad Kringstad

29 August 2021 17	Sarpsborg 08	5–0	Sandefjord	Sarpsborg
18:00 CEST (UTC+2)	Koné 15', 22', 29', 45+6'; Salétros (yellow card) 54'; Foss 77' (o.g.)	Report	Jónsson (yellow card) 62'; Foss (yellow card) 64'	Stadium: Sarpsborg stadion Attendance: 2,724; Referee: Rohit Saggi

12 September 2021 18	Sandefjord	3–0	Vålerenga	Sandefjord
18:00 CEST (UTC+2)	Kurtovic 43'; Oldrup Jensen 60' (o.g.); Jónsson 73'	Report	Zuta (yellow card) 55'	Stadium: Release Arena; Attendance: 1,800; Referee: Svein Oddvar Moen

19 September 2021 19	Mjøndalen	1–1	Sandefjord	Mjøndalen
18:00 CEST (UTC+2)	Nakkim 61'	Report	Jónsson (yellow card) 32'; Vales 45'	Stadium: Consto Arena; Attendance: 1,350; Referee: Kai Erik Steen

26 September 2021 20	Sandefjord	0–3	Stabæk	Sandefjord
18:00 CEST (UTC+2)	Kurtovic (yellow card) 45'; Smeulers (red card) 55'	Report	Haugen 5'; Moe (yellow card) 49' (goal) 89'; Geelmuyden (yellow card) 78'; Kirkevold 80'	Stadium: Release Arena; Attendance: 1,411; Referee: Mohammad Usman Aslam

3 October 2021 21	Viking	2–1	Sandefjord	Stavanger
18:00 CEST (UTC+2)	Gunnarsson (red card) 18'; Vikstøl (yellow card) 43'; Berisha 49', 77'; Friðjónsson (yellow card) 79'	Report	Vales (yellow card) 25'; Foss (yellow card) 40'; Kreuzriegler 57'	Stadium: SR-Bank Arena; Attendance: 14,105; Referee: Kristoffer Hagenes

17 October 2021 22	Sandefjord	0–0	Odd	Sandefjord
17:00 CEST (UTC+2)	Smeulers (yellow card) 14'; Brenden (yellow card) 36'; Kreuzriegler (yellow card) 76'	Report	Jørgensen (yellow card) 42'; John Kitolano (yellow card) 87'	Stadium: Release Arena; Attendance: 4,673; Referee: Tom Harald Hagen

24 October 2021 23	Rosenborg	4–1	Sandefjord	Trondheim
17:00 CEST (UTC+2)	Holse 6', 20'; Vecchia 17'; Islamovic 64'	Report	Jónsson (yellow card) 29'; Zé Eduardo (yellow card) 37'; Moen Foss (yellow card) 53'; Ruud Tveter 68'; Vales (yellow card) 78'; Kurtovic (yellow card) 80'	Stadium: Lerkendal Stadion; Attendance: 17,439; Referee: Sivert Amland

27 October 2021 24	Sandefjord	2–0	Strømsgodset	Sandefjord
18:00 CEST (UTC+2)	Södlund (yellow card) 29'; Ruud Tveter 49'; Jónsson 51'; Normann Hansen (yellow card) 80'	Report	Leifsson (yellow card) 76'	Stadium: Release Arena; Attendance: 1,655; Referee: Kristoffer Hagenes

31 October 2021 25	Bodø/Glimt	1–0	Sandefjord	Bodø
18:00 CEST (UTC+2)	Vetlesen 63'; Hagen (yellow card) 85'	Report	Smeulers (yellow card) 37'; Jónsson (yellow card) 55'	Stadium: Aspmyra Stadion; Attendance: 4,015; Referee: Rohit Saggi

7 November 2021 26	Molde	3–1	Sandefjord	Molde
17:00 CEST (UTC+2)	Eikrem 8'; Brynhildsen 14'; Sinyan 34'	Report	Brenden 82'	Stadium: Aker Stadion; Attendance: 4,698; Referee: Tom Harald Hagen

21 November 2021 27	Sandefjord	2–2	Brann	Sandefjord
17:00 CEST (UTC+2)	Jónsson 14'; Normann Hansen 16'; Kreuzriegler (yellow card) 49'	Report	Heggebø 5'; Heltne Nilsen (yellow card) 13'; Finne 90+2'	Stadium: Release Arena; Attendance: 3,609; Referee: Tore Hansen

28 November 2021 28	Haugesund	1–2	Sandefjord	Haugesund
17:00 CEST (UTC+2)	Liseth 1'	Report	Kurtovic 17' (yellow card) 50'; Brenden 79'; Vega (yellow card) 90'	Stadium: Haugesund Stadion; Attendance: 3,628; Referee: Marius Lien

5 December 2021 29	Sandefjord	3–2	Kristiansund	Sandefjord
17:00 CEST (UTC+2)	Jónsson (yellow card) 15' (goal) 30'; Ruud Tveter 38'; Brenden 45'; Wembangomo (yellow card) 90'	Report	Gjertsen 53'; Strand Nilsen (yellow card) 56'; Isaksen 77'	Stadium: Release Arena; Attendance: 1,077; Referee: Sigurd Smehus Kringstad

12 December 2021 30	Lillestrøm	2–0	Sandefjord	Lillestrøm
17:00 CEST (UTC+2)	Dragsnes 28'; Ranger (yellow card) 42'; Mathisen 80'	Report		Stadium: Åråsen Stadion; Attendance: 4,748; Referee: Kristoffer Hagenes

==== Table ====
Pos	Team	Pld	W	D	L	GF	GA	GD	Pts
8	Sarpsborg 08	30	11	6	13	39	44	−5	39
9	Strømsgodset	30	9	9	12	43	43	0	36
10	Sandefjord	30	10	6	14	38	52	−14	36
11	Haugesund	30	9	8	13	46	45	+1	35
12	Tromsø	30	8	11	11	33	44	−11	35

Source: Football Association of Norway (in Norwegian)
Rules for classification: 1) Points; 2) Goal difference; 3) Goals scored; 4) Head-to-head points; 5) Head-to-head goal difference; 6) Head-to-head away goals scored (only if between two teams); 7) Head-to-head goals scored; 8) Play-off (only used to decide champions or relegation).

=== Norwegian Cup ===
25 July 2021 First round	Pors Grenland	1–4	Sandefjord	Porsgrunn
18:00 CEST (UTC+2)	Lauritzen (yellow card) 6'; Thorsen 72'; Larsen (yellow card) 90+4'	Report	Falchener (yellow card) 49'; Risan (yellow card) 56' (goal) 58'; Södlund 61'; Gussiås 67' (pen.); Jónsson 85'	Stadium: Pors Stadion; Attendance: 733; Referee: Herman Leiulfsrud Aass

1 August 2021 Second round	Arendal	5–4 (a.e.t.)	Sandefjord	Arendal
18:00 CEST (UTC+2)	Hafstad 27'; Hovstad 52'; Hellum 60'; Mladenovic 95'; Roppestad 105+1'	Report	Gussiås 15', 50'; Nyenetue 45+2'; Södlund (yellow card) 58'; Normann Hansen (yellow card) 90+3'; Jónsson 118'	Stadium: Norac Stadion; Attendance: 802; Referee: Svein Tore Sinnes

== Squad statistics ==
As of match played 17 October 2021

=== Appearances and goals ===
No.	Pos	Nat	Player	Total		Eliteserien		Norwegian Cup	
No.	Pos	Nat	Player	Apps	Goals	Apps	Goals	Apps	Goals
1	GK	(Norway) NOR	Jacob Storevik	30	0	30	0	0	0
2	DF	(Norway) NOR	Brice Wembangomo	24	0	23+1	0	0	0
3	DF	(Andorra) AND	Marc Vales	20	1	11+7	1	2	0
4	DF	(Netherlands) NED	Ian Smeulers	12	0	12	0	0	0
5	DF	(Austria) AUT	Martin Kreuzriegler	27	1	26+1	1	0	0
6	MF	(Norway) NOR	Sander Risan	24	3	14+8	2	2	1
8	MF	(Brazil) BRA	Zé Eduardo	19	0	5+13	0	0+1	0
9	FW	(Norway) NOR	Sivert Gussiås	14	4	0+12	1	2	3
10	FW	(Costa Rica) CRC	Deyver Vega	5	0	3+2	0	0	0
11	MF	(Norway) NOR	Kristoffer Normann Hansen	27	7	23+3	7	0+1	0
12	DF	(Norway) NOR	Mats Haakenstad	19	0	17	0	1+1	0
13	DF	(Norway) NOR	Lars Markmanrud	2	0	1+1	0	0	0
14	FW	(Norway) NOR	Alexander Ruud Tveter	32	6	28+2	6	0+2	0
15	MF	(Norway) NOR	Erik Brenden	21	3	10+10	3	0+1	0
16	MF	(Norway) NOR	André Sødlund	16	1	4+10	0	2	1
17	DF	(Norway) NOR	Sander Moen Foss	29	2	26+2	2	1	0
18	MF	(Sweden) SWE	William Kurtovic	26	2	21+3	2	1+1	0
19	MF	(Bosnia and Herzegovina) BIH	Amer Ordagić	17	0	12+5	0	0	0
20	FW	(Norway) NOR	Franklin Nyenetue	25	1	7+16	0	2	1
21	MF	(Norway) NOR	Peder Meen Johansen	3	0	0+2	0	1	0
22	MF	(Norway) NOR	Moussa Njie	9	0	2+5	0	2	0
23	DF	(Iceland) ISL	Viðar Jónsson	31	13	29	11	0+2	2
24	MF	(Norway) NOR	Harmeet Singh	22	0	21+1	0	0	0
25	MF	(Norway) NOR	Henrik Falchener	2	0	1	0	1	0
29	DF	(Norway) NOR	Jørgen Kili Fjeldskår	3	0	0+2	0	1	0
40	MF	(Norway) NOR	Vetle Walle Egeli	5	0	0+3	0	2	0
54	GK	(Norway) NOR	Andreas Albertsen	0	0	0	0	0	0
93	FW	(Norway) NOR	Chuma Anene	1	0	0+1	0	0	0
99	GK	(Norway) NOR	Jesper Granlund	2	0	0	0	2	0
Players away from Sandefjord on loan:
22	DF	(Norway) NOR	Herman Solberg Nilsen	0	0	0	0	0	0
Players who left Sandefjord during the season:
4	MF	(Spain) ESP	Enric Vallès	9	0	4+4	0	0+1	0
7	FW	(Spain) ESP	Marcos Celorrio	1	0	0+1	0	0	0
92	GK	(Denmark) DEN	Frederik Due	0	0	0	0	0	0
—	MF	(Norway) NOR	Martin Andersen	0	0	0	0	0	0

=== Disciplinary record ===
Number	Position	Nation	Name	Eliteserien		Norwegian Cup		Total	
Number	Position	Nation	Name	Booked	Sent off (straight red)	Booked	Sent off (straight red)	Booked	Sent off (straight red)
1	GK	(Norway)	Jacob Storevik	0	0	0	0	0	0
2	DF	(Norway)	Brice Wembangomo	4	0	0	0	4	0
3	DF	(Andorra)	Marc Vales	5	0	0	0	5	0
4	DF	(Netherlands)	Ian Smeulers	2	1	0	0	2	1
5	DF	(Austria)	Martin Kreuzriegler	5	0	0	0	5	0
6	MF	(Norway)	Sander Risan	0	0	1	0	1	0
8	MF	(Brazil)	Zé Eduardo	3	0	0	0	3	0
9	FW	(Norway)	Sivert Gussiås	0	0	0	0	0	0
10	FW	(Costa Rica)	Deyver Vega	0	0	0	0	0	0
11	MF	(Norway)	Kristoffer Normann Hansen	2	0	1	0	3	0
12	DF	(Norway)	Mats Haakenstad	0	0	0	0	0	0
13	DF	(Norway)	Lars Markmanrud	0	0	0	0	0	0
14	FW	(Norway)	Alexander Ruud Tveter	0	0	0	0	0	0
15	MF	(Norway)	Erik Brenden	2	0	0	0	1	0
16	MF	(Norway)	André Södlund	1	0	1	0	2	0
17	DF	(Norway)	Sander Moen Foss	5	0	0	0	5	0
18	MF	(Sweden)	William Kurtovic	4	0	0	0	4	0
19	MF	(Bosnia and Herzegovina)	Amer Ordagić	0	0	0	0	0	0
20	FW	(Norway)	Franklin Nyenetue	0	0	0	0	0	0
21	MF	(Norway)	Peder Meen Johansen	0	0	0	0	0	0
22	MF	(Norway)	Moussa Njie	0	0	0	0	0	0
23	MF	(Iceland)	Viðar Jónsson	5	0	0	0	5	0
24	MF	(Norway)	Harmeet Singh	3	0	0	0	3	0
25	MF	(Norway)	Henrik Falchener	0	0	1	0	1	0
29	DF	(Norway)	Jørgen Kili Fjeldskår	0	0	0	0	0	0
40	MF	(Norway)	Vetle Walle Egeli	0	0	0	0	0	0
54	GK	(Norway)	Andreas Albertsen	0	0	0	0	0	0
93	FW	(Norway)	Chuma Anene	0	0	0	0	0	0
99	GK	(Norway)	Jesper Granlund	0	0	0	0	0	0
Players who left Sandefjord during the season:
4	MF	(Spain)	Enric Vallès	0	0	0	0	0	0
7	FW	(Spain)	Marcos Celorrio	0	0	0	0	0	0
92	GK	(Denmark)	Frederik Due	0	0	0	0	0	0
			TOTALS	41	1	3	0	44	1
