= 2019 Sandefjord Fotball season =

Sandefjord
2019 season
- Chairman: Roger Gulliksen
- Manager: Martí Cifuentes
- Stadium: Komplett Arena
- 1. divisjon: 2nd (promoted)
- Norwegian Cup: Third Round vs Odd
- Top goalscorer: League: Pontus Engblom (19); All: Pontus Engblom (19)

The 2019 season was Sandefjord's first season back in the OBOS-ligaen following their relegation from the Eliteserien in 2018.

== Squad ==
As of 20 February 2019.

Note: Flags indicate national team as defined under FIFA eligibility rules; some limited exceptions apply. Players may hold more than one non-FIFA nationality.

| No. | Pos. | Nation | Player |
|---|---|---|---|
| 1 | GK | NOR | Jacob Storevik |
| 2 | DF | NOR | Lars Grorud (vice-captain) |
| 3 | DF | NOR | Sander Moen Foss |
| 4 | DF | NOR | Christer Reppesgård |
| 5 | MF | ESP | Enric Vallès (3rd captain) |
| 6 | FW | NOR | Mohamed Ofkir |
| 7 | MF | ISL | Emil Pálsson |
| 8 | MF | NOR | Erik Mjelde |
| 9 | MF | NOR | Håvard Storbæk (captain) |
| 10 | FW | ESP | Rufo |
| 11 | MF | NOR | Tobias Svendsen (on loan from Molde) |
| 12 | GK | FIN | Walter Viitala |
| 13 | DF | NOR | Marius Høibråten |

| No. | Pos. | Nation | Player |
|---|---|---|---|
| 14 | MF | NOR | Stefan Mladenovic |
| 15 | FW | SWE | Pontus Engblom |
| 16 | MF | NOR | Sander Risan |
| 17 | DF | AND | Marc Vales |
| 18 | MF | SWE | William Kurtovic |
| 19 | DF | NOR | Brice Wembangomo |
| 20 | FW | NOR | George Gibson |
| 21 | DF | SWE | Anton Kralj |
| 22 | FW | NOR | Mohammed Fellah |
| 23 | DF | ISL | Viðar Jónsson |
| 24 | MF | ESP | Tito |
| 99 | GK | NOR | Jesper Granlund |

=== Players out on loan ===
Note: Flags indicate national team as defined under FIFA eligibility rules; some limited exceptions apply. Players may hold more than one non-FIFA nationality.

| No. | Pos. | Nation | Player |
|---|---|---|---|
| — | MF | NOR | Ole Breistøl (on loan to Fram Larvik) |
| 34 | FW | NOR | Herman Solberg Nilsen (on loan to Fram Larvik) |
| 42 | MF | NOR | Jakob Dunsby (on loan to IFK Helsingfors) |

== Transfers ==
=== Winter ===
In: Note: Flags indicate national team as defined under FIFA eligibility rules; some limited exceptions apply. Players may hold more than one non-FIFA nationality.

| No. | Pos. | Nation | Player |
|---|---|---|---|
| 14 | MF | NOR | Stefan Mladenovic (from (Norway) Odd) |
| 11 | MF | NOR | Tobias Svendsen (on loan from (Norway) Molde) |
| 19 | DF | NOR | Brice Wembangomo (from (Norway) Jerv) |
| 23 | DF | ISL | Viðar Jónsson (from (Norway) SK Brann) |
| 24 | MF | ESP | Tito (from Free agent) |
| 21 | DF | SWE | Anton Kralj (from Free agent) |
| 12 | GK | FIN | Walter Viitala (from Free agent) |

Out: Note: Flags indicate national team as defined under FIFA eligibility rules; some limited exceptions apply. Players may hold more than one non-FIFA nationality.

| No. | Pos. | Nation | Player |
|---|---|---|---|
| 10 | MF | ESP | Pau Morer (released) |
| 11 | FW | NOR | Fitim Azemi (loan return to (Norway) Vålerenga) |
| 12 | GK | NOR | Eirik Holmen Johansen (to (Norway) Brann) |
| 19 | DF | SEN | Victor Demba Bindia (to (Jordan) Al-Wehdat) |
| 21 | DF | NOR | Stian Ringstad (loan return to (Norway) Strømsgodset) |
| 24 | DF | NOR | Alf Øivind Aslesen (to (Norway) FK Tønsberg) |
| 25 | MF | NOR | Sabawon Shamohammad (to (Norway) Flint) |
| 23 | MF | NOR | Ole Breistøl (on loan to Fram Larvik) |
| 34 | FW | NOR | Herman Solberg Nilsen (on loan to Fram Larvik) |
| 42 | MF | NOR | Jakob Dunsby (on loan to IFK Helsingfors) |

=== Summer ===
In: Note: Flags indicate national team as defined under FIFA eligibility rules; some limited exceptions apply. Players may hold more than one non-FIFA nationality.

| No. | Pos. | Nation | Player |
|---|---|---|---|
| 42 | MF | NOR | Jakob Maslø Dunsby (loan return from (Finland) HIFK) |

Out: Note: Flags indicate national team as defined under FIFA eligibility rules; some limited exceptions apply. Players may hold more than one non-FIFA nationality.

| No. | Pos. | Nation | Player |
|---|---|---|---|
| 4 | DF | NOR | Christer Reppesgård Hansen (to Sandnes Ulf) |
| 11 | MF | NOR | Tobias Svendsen (loan return to Molde) |
| 16 | MF | NOR | Sander Risan Mørk (on loan to Fram Larvik) |
| 22 | MF | NOR | Mohammed Fellah (released) |

== Friendlies ==
| 23 January 2019 | Sandefjord (Norway) | 10–1 | (Russia) GBU 75 Savelovskaya | Turkey |
| 13:00 CET (UTC+1) | Rufo 19' (pen.); Ofkir 24'; Wembangomo 41'; Mladenovic 54'; Engblom 58' (pen.), 68', 72', 84'; Mjelde 75'; Storbæk 80' | Report |

| 2 February 2019 | Fram | 1–1 | Sandefjord | Skien |
| 15:00 CET (UTC+1) | Osestad | Report | Engblom (pen.) | Stadium: Tollnes kunstgress |

| 8 February 2019 | Skeid | 0–0 | Sandefjord | Lillestrøm |
| 15:00 CET (UTC+1) | | Report | | Stadium: LSK-hallen |

| 15 February 2019 | Sandefjord (Norway) | 1–0 | (Estonia) Nõmme Kalju | Marbella, Spain |
| 16:30 CET (UTC+1) | Engblom 70' (pen.) | Report | | Stadium: Estadio Jose Burgos Quintana |

| 18 February 2019 | Viking | 2–0 | Sandefjord | Marbella, Spain |
| 13:00 CET (UTC+1) | | | | Stadium: Estadio Municipal Antonio Lorenzo Cuevas |

| 21 February 2019 | Linense (Spain) | 3–2 | (Norway) Sandefjord | Marbella, Spain |
| 11:30 CET (UTC+1) | | Report | | Stadium: Complejo Deportivo Arroyo Enmedio |

| 2 March 2019 | Mjøndalen | 2–0 | Sandefjord | Mjøndalen |
| 15:00 CET (UTC+1) | | Report | | Stadium: Consto Arena |

== Competitions ==
=== 1. divisjon ===
==== Results summary ====
| Overall | | | | | | | | Home | | | | | | Away | | | | | |
| Pld | W | D | L | GF | GA | GD | Pts | W | D | L | GF | GA | GD | W | D | L | GF | GA | GD |
|---|---|---|---|---|---|---|---|---|---|---|---|---|---|---|---|---|---|---|---|
| 30 | 19 | 8 | 3 | 53 | 30 | +23 | 65 | 12 | 2 | 1 | 22 | 8 | +14 | 7 | 6 | 2 | 31 | 22 | +9 |

Last updated: 9 November 2019.
Source: soccerway

==== Results by round ====
| Round | 1 | 2 | 3 | 4 | 5 | 6 | 7 | 8 | 9 | 10 | 11 | 12 | 13 | 14 | 15 | 16 | 17 | 18 | 19 | 20 | 21 | 22 | 23 | 24 | 25 | 26 | 27 | 28 | 29 | 30 |
|---|---|---|---|---|---|---|---|---|---|---|---|---|---|---|---|---|---|---|---|---|---|---|---|---|---|---|---|---|---|---|
| Ground | H | A | H | A | A | H | A | H | A | H | A | H | A | H | A | H | H | A | H | A | H | A | H | A | H | A | H | A | H | A |
| Result | W | W | D | D | D | W | W | W | W | L | W | W | W | W | L | W | D | D | W | D | W | D | W | D | W | W | W | W | W | L |
| Position | 3 | 1 | 2 | 3 | 3 | 2 | 2 | 2 | 2 | 3 | 2 | 2 | 2 | 2 | 2 | 2 | 2 | 3 | 2 | 3 | 3 | 3 | 3 | 2 | 2 | 2 | 2 | 2 | 2 | 2 |

Updated to match(es) played on 9 November 2019. Source: see below
A = Away; H = Home; W = Win; D = Draw; L = Loss

==== Results ====
| 31 March 2019 1 | Sandefjord | 1–0 | KFUM Oslo | Sandefjord |
| 18:00 CEST (UTC+2) | Tito 90+2' | Report | | Stadium: Komplett Arena; Attendance: 2,675; Referee: Christian Moen |

| 7 April 2019 2 | Raufoss | 0–2 | Sandefjord | Raufoss |
| 15:00 CEST (UTC+2) | | Report | Engblom 42', 63' | Stadium: Nammo Stadion; Attendance: 1,196; Referee: Jan Morten Tennøy |

| 13 April 2019 3 | Sandefjord | 1–1 | Aalesund | Sandefjord |
| 15:30 CEST (UTC+2) | Kurtovic 81' | Report | Larsen 66' | Stadium: Komplett Arena; Attendance: 2,846; Referee: Steinar Hauge |

| 22 April 2019 4 | Tromsdalen | 3–3 | Sandefjord | Tromsdalen |
| 18:00 CEST (UTC+2) | Lysvoll 26'; Kristoffersen 37'; Andersen 87' | Report | Storbæk 2'; Vallés 32'; Engblom 45+1' | Stadium: TUIL Arena; Attendance: 220; Referee: Ajdin Medic |

| 27 April 2019 5 | Start | 2–2 | Sandefjord | Kristiansand |
| 15:30 CEST (UTC+2) | Bringaker 53'; Sigurðarson 60' | Report | Lowe 49' (o.g.); Høibråten 90+5' | Stadium: Sparebanken Sør Arena; Attendance: 4,556; Referee: Sivert Amland |

| 5 May 2019 6 | Sandefjord | 2–1 | Nest-Sotra | Sandefjord |
| 15:00 CEST (UTC+2) | Engblom 66' (pen.), 90' | Report | Mehnert 67' | Stadium: Komplett Arena; Attendance: 1,809; Referee: Svein Tore Sinnes |

| 12 May 2019 7 | Sandnes Ulf | 2–4 | Sandefjord | Sandnes |
| 18:00 CEST (UTC+2) | Kachi 43'; Eriksen 81' | Report | Kurtovic 3'; Engblom 6', 75'; Storbæk 86' | Stadium: Øster Hus Arena; Attendance: 1,300; Referee: Christian Moen |

| 16 May 2019 8 | Sandefjord | 1–0 | Skeid | Sandefjord |
| 18:00 CEST (UTC+2) | Engblom 83' | Report | | Stadium: Komplett Arena; Attendance: 2,792; Referee: Jan Morten Tennøy |

| 26 May 2019 9 | Strømmen | 2–3 | Sandefjord | Strømmen |
| 18:00 CEST (UTC+2) | Gussiås 30'; Ness 41' | Report | Storbæk 33', 76'; Jónsson 69' | Stadium: Strømmen Stadion; Attendance: 374; Referee: Daniel Higraff |

| 2 June 2019 10 | Sandefjord | 0–3 | Sogndal | Sandefjord |
| 20:00 CEST (UTC+2) | | Report | Antonijevic 29'; Haugen 68', 77' | Stadium: Komplett Arena; Attendance: 2,115; Referee: Rohit Saggi |

| 16 June 2019 11 | Notodden | 0–2 | Sandefjord | Notodden |
| 18:00 CEST (UTC+2) | | Report | Rufo 31'; Storbæk 87' | Stadium: Optime Arena; Attendance: 421; Referee: Harald Vollstad Sletner |

| 22 June 2019 12 | Sandefjord | 3–2 | Ull/Kisa | Sandefjord |
| 15:30 CEST (UTC+2) | Engblom 8', 78', 90+5' | Report | Økland 37' (pen.); Langås 60' | Stadium: Komplett Arena; Attendance: 1,972; Referee: Mohammad Usman Aslam |

| 30 June 2019 13 | Jerv | 0–2 | Sandefjord | Grimstad |
| 18:00 CEST (UTC+2) | | Report | Engblom 5' (pen.); Rufo 30' | Stadium: J.J. Ugland Stadion - Levermyr; Attendance: 1,369; Referee: Mads Skarsem |

| 21 July 2019 14 | Sandefjord | 1–0 | Kongsvinger | Sandefjord |
| 20:00 CEST (UTC+2) | Engblom 79' | Report | | Stadium: Komplett Arena; Attendance: 2,284; Referee: Ola Hobber Nilsen |

| 28 July 2019 15 | HamKam | 1–0 | Sandefjord | Hamar |
| 18:00 CEST (UTC+2) | Nordli 43' (pen.) | Report | | Stadium: Briskeby Arena; Attendance: 1,337; Referee: Eivind Bodding |

| 4 August 2019 16 | Sandefjord | 1–0 | Tromsdalen | Sandefjord |
| 18:00 CEST (UTC+2) | Engblom 79' | Report | | Stadium: Komplett Arena; Attendance: 2,035; Referee: Steinar Hauge |

| 9 August 2019 17 | Sandefjord | 0–0 | Start | Sandefjord |
| 19:00 CEST (UTC+2) | | Report | | Stadium: Komplett Arena; Attendance: 5,174; Referee: Sivert Amland |

| 17 August 2019 18 | Skeid | 2–2 | Sandefjord | Oslo |
| 15:30 CEST (UTC+2) | Buduson 28'; Nunez 47' | Report | Høibråten 42'; Mjelde 83' (pen.) | Stadium: Intility Arena; Attendance: 374; Referee: Jan Morten Tennøy |

| 21 August 2019 19 | Sandefjord | 1–0 | Raufoss | Sandefjord |
| 18:00 CEST (UTC+2) | Kralj 54' | Report | | Stadium: Komplett Arena; Attendance: 1,920; Referee: Svein Tore Sinnes |

| 25 August 2019 20 | Nest-Sotra | 1–1 | Sandefjord | Ågotnes |
| 18:00 CEST (UTC+2) | Hestetun 51' | Report | Rufo 69' | Stadium: Ågotnes Stadion; Attendance: 282; Referee: Christian Moen |

| 1 September 2019 21 | Sandefjord | 3–1 | Sandnes Ulf | Sandefjord |
| 15:00 CEST (UTC+2) | Tito 37'; Engblom 39'; Vallés 65' | Report | Akinyemi 80' | Stadium: Komplett Arena; Attendance: 1,829; Referee: Harald Vollstad Sletner |

| 15 September 2019 22 | Sogndal | 1–1 | Sandefjord | Sogndalsfjøra |
| 18:00 CEST (UTC+2) | K. Hoven 38' (pen.) | Report | Rufo 71' | Stadium: Fosshaugane Campus; Attendance: 1,687; Referee: Marius Lien |

| 18 September 2019 23 | Sandefjord | 2–0 | Strømmen | Sandefjord |
| 18:00 CEST (UTC+2) | Ofkir 10'; Engblom 23' | Report | | Stadium: Komplett Arena; Attendance: 1,870; Referee: Ajdin Medic |

| 22 September 2019 24 | KFUM Oslo | 3–3 | Sandefjord | Oslo |
| 15:00 CEST (UTC+2) | Sortevik 25', 83'; Hammer 81' | Report | Grorud 30'; Storbæk 39', 72' | Stadium: KFUM Arena; Attendance: 909; Referee: Daniel Higraff |

| 29 September 2019 25 | Sandefjord | 2–0 | HamKam | Sandefjord |
| 15:00 CEST (UTC+2) | Engblom 69'; Gibson 90' | Report | | Stadium: Komplett Arena; Attendance: 1,868; Referee: Mohammad Usman Aslam |

| 6 October 2019 26 | Kongsvinger | 2–3 | Sandefjord | Kongsvinger |
| 18:00 CEST (UTC+2) | Vinjor 21'; Güven 50' | Report | Ofkir 10'; Engblom 13'; Vallès 61' | Stadium: Gjemselund Stadion; Attendance: 1,107; Referee: Marius Hansen Grøtta |

| 20 October 2019 27 | Sandefjord | 3–0 | Notodden | Sandefjord |
| 18:00 CEST (UTC+2) | Høibråten 56'; Holmen 64' (o.g.); Vallés 81' | Report | | Stadium: Komplett Arena; Attendance: 2,269; Referee: Steinar Hauge |

| 27 October 2019 28 | Ull/Kisa | 0–2 | Sandefjord | Jessheim |
| 15:00 CET (UTC+1) | | Report | Mjelde 54'; Engblom 68' | Stadium: Jessheim Stadion; Attendance: 851; Referee: Svein Tore Sinnes |

| 2 November 2019 29 | Sandefjord | 1–0 | Jerv | Sandefjord |
| 16:00 CET (UTC+1) | Rufo 54' | Report | | Stadium: Komplett Arena; Attendance: 3,392; Referee: Mads Skarsem |

| 9 November 2019 30 | Aalesund | 3–1 | Sandefjord | Ålesund |
| 15:30 CET (UTC+1) | Agdestein 24', 79'; Castro 68' | Report | Kurtovic 21' | Stadium: Color Line Stadion; Attendance: 5,495; Referee: Christian Moen |

==== Table ====
| Pos | Team | Pld | W | D | L | GF | GA | GD | Pts | Promotion, qualification or relegation |
|---|---|---|---|---|---|---|---|---|---|---|
| 1 | Aalesund (C, P) | 30 | 25 | 4 | 1 | 67 | 25 | +42 | 79 | Promotion to Eliteserien |
| 2 | Sandefjord (P) | 30 | 19 | 8 | 3 | 53 | 30 | +23 | 65 | Promotion to Eliteserien |
| 3 | Start (O, P) | 30 | 19 | 5 | 6 | 54 | 31 | +23 | 62 | Qualification for the promotion play-offs |
| 4 | KFUM Oslo | 30 | 13 | 9 | 8 | 58 | 42 | +16 | 48 | Qualification for the promotion play-offs |
| 5 | Kongsvinger | 30 | 14 | 4 | 12 | 38 | 36 | +2 | 46 | Qualification for the promotion play-offs |

Source: nifs.no (in Norwegian), Soccerway
Rules for classification: 1) Points; 2) Goal difference; 3) Goals scored; 4) Head-to-head points; 5) Head-to-head goal difference; 6) Head-to-head away goals scored (only if between two teams); 7) Head-to-head goals scored; 8) Play-off (only used to decide champions or relegation).
(C) Champions; (O) Play-off winners; (P) Promoted

=== Norwegian Cup ===
| 1 May 2019 First round | Tønsberg | 0–2 | Sandefjord | Tønsberg |
| 15:00 CEST (UTC+2) | | Report | Ofkir 4'; Jónsson 83' | Stadium: Tønsberg Gressbane; Attendance: 930; Referee: Herman Leiulfsrud Aass |

| 22 May 2019 Second round | Jerv | 1–2 | Sandefjord | Grimstad |
| 18:00 CEST (UTC+1) | Hoel Andersen 90+5' | Report | Ofkir 89'; Mladenovic 90+2' | Stadium: J.J. Ugland Stadion; Attendance: 935; Referee: Jon Romuld Håversen |

| 19 June 2019 Third round | Sandefjord | 1–1 (a.e.t.) (1–3 p) | Odd | Sandefjord |
| 18:00 UTC (UTC+1) | Grorud 38' | Report | Ruud 90' | Stadium: Komplett Arena; Attendance: 1,126; Referee: Trond Ivar Døvle |
| | Penalties |
| | Vallès (penalty missed); Mjelde (penalty scored); Kurtovic (penalty missed); Engblom (penalty missed) | | (penalty scored) Ruud; (penalty missed) Lauritsen; (penalty scored) Børven; (penalty scored) Nordkvelle |
