= Henrik Falchener =

Norwegian footballer (born 2003)

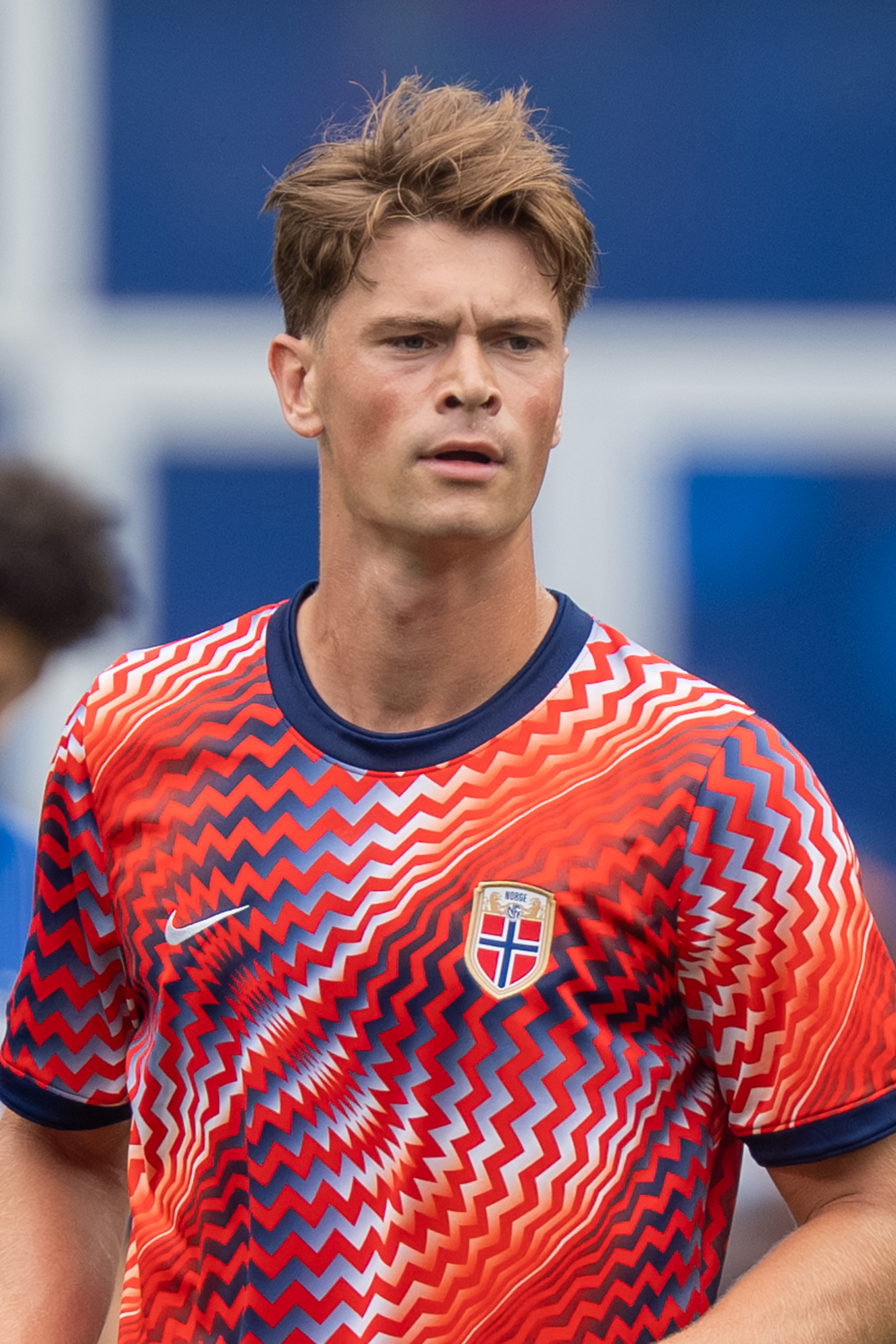
- Falchener with Norway in 2026

Personal information
- Full name: Henrik Sælebakke Falchener
- Date of birth: 8 May 2003 (age 23)
- Height: 1.94 m (6 ft 4 in)
- Position: Centre-back

Team information
- Current team: Viking
- Number: 25

Youth career
- –2016: Flint
- 2017: Strømsgodset
- 2018–2021: Sandefjord

Senior career*
Years	Team	Apps	(Gls)
2019–2021	Sandefjord 2	18	(1)
2020–2021	Sandefjord	2	(0)
2022–2023	Ørn Horten	41	(3)
2023	Ørn Horten 2	2	(0)
2024	Egersund	29	(1)
2025–	Viking	39	(8)

International career^{‡}
2020	Norway U17	4	(1)
2021	Norway U18	3	(0)
2026–	Norway	2	(0)
- * Club domestic league appearances and goals as of 07:00, 25 May 2026 (UTC) ‡ National team caps and goals as of 26 June 2026

Henrik Sælebakke Falchener (born 8 May 2003) is a Norwegian professional footballer who plays as a centre-back for Viking and the Norway national team.

== Club career ==
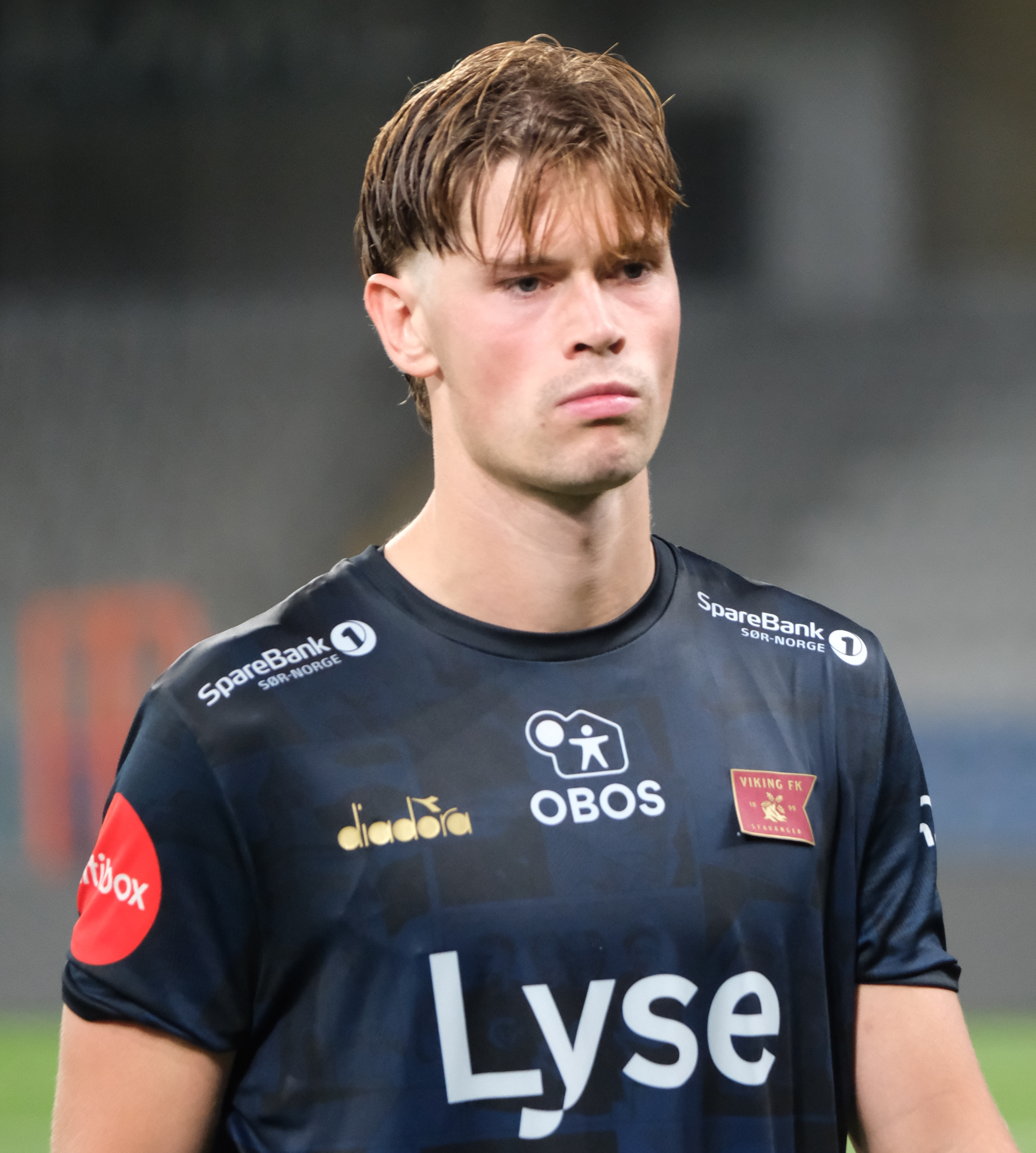
Falchener with Viking in 2025

Falchener was signed by Viking ahead of the 2025 season, after impressing for Egersund in the 2024 Norwegian First Division. After an impressive 2025 season for both Falchener and Viking, where Falchener scored six goals, most of any centre-back in the league, Viking finished top of the table for the first time in over thirty years.

== International career ==
On 31 March 2026, Falchener made his Norway national team debut in a friendly match against Switzerland. On 21 May 2026, he was named in Norway's 2026 FIFA World Cup squad.

== Career statistics ==
As of match played 24 May 2026

Appearances and goals by club, season and competition
Club	Season	League			National Cup		Europe		Other		Total	
Club	Season	Division	Apps	Goals	Apps	Goals	Apps	Goals	Apps	Goals	Apps	Goals
Sandefjord 2	2019	4. divisjon	9	0	—		—		2 (Note: Appearances in 4. divisjon promotional play-offs)	0	11	0
Sandefjord 2	2021	4. divisjon	9	1	—		—		2	0	11	1
Sandefjord 2	Total		18	1	—		—		4	0	22	1
Sandefjord	2020	Eliteserien	1	0	—		—		—		1	0
Sandefjord	2021	Eliteserien	1	0	1	0	—		—		2	0
Sandefjord	Total		2	0	1	0	—		—		3	0
Ørn Horten	2022	2. divisjon	17	2	1	0	—		—		18	2
Ørn Horten	2023	2. divisjon	24	1	2	0	—		—		26	1
Ørn Horten	Total		41	3	3	0	—		—		44	3
Ørn Horten 2	2023	4. divisjon	2	0	—		—		—		2	0
Egersund	2024	1. divisjon	29	1	3	0	—		—		32	1
Viking	2025	Eliteserien	29	6	7	0	3 (Note: Appearances in UEFA Conference League)	0	—		39	6
Viking	2026	Eliteserien	10	2	2	0	0	0	—		12	2
Viking	Total		39	8	9	0	3	0	—		51	8
Career total			131	13	16	0	3	0	4	0	154	13

== Honours ==
Viking

- Eliteserien: 2025

Individual

- Eliteserien Player of the Month: May 2025
