= Sander Risan Mørk =

Norwegian footballer (born 2000)

Sander Risan
Personal information
- Full name: Sander Risan Mørk
- Date of birth: 6 December 2000 (age 25)
- Position: Midfielder

Team information
- Current team: Sandefjord
- Number: 6

Youth career
- Flint
- 2016–2018: Sandefjord

Senior career*
Years	Team	Apps	(Gls)
2016	Flint	3	(0)
2018–	Sandefjord	118	(6)
2019	→ Fram (loan)	7	(2)
- * Club domestic league appearances and goals as of 17 July 2026

Sander Risan Mørk (born 6 December 2000) is a Norwegian midfielder who plays for Sandefjord.

== Career ==
Raised in IL Flint, he made his senior debut there in 2016 before joining Sandefjord's youth setup. He made his senior debut here in November 2018, and also played one 2019 Norwegian Football Cup game before being loaned out to IF Fram Larvik. He played the 2020 Eliteserien opener.

== Career statistics ==
As of 12 July 2025

Appearances and goals by club, season and competition
Club	Season	League			National cup		Total	
Club	Season	Division	Apps	Goals	Apps	Goals	Apps	Goals
Flint	2016	4. divisjon	3	0	0	0	3	0
Sandefjord	2018	Eliteserien	1	0	0	0	1	0
Sandefjord	2019	1. divisjon	0	0	1	0	1	0
Sandefjord	2020	Eliteserien	12	0	—		12	0
Sandefjord	2021	Eliteserien	22	2	2	1	24	3
Sandefjord	2022	Eliteserien	5	0	1	0	6	0
Sandefjord	2023	Eliteserien	21	0	1	0	22	0
Sandefjord	2024	Eliteserien	27	1	1	0	28	1
Sandefjord	2025	Eliteserien	13	2	2	0	15	2
Sandefjord	Total		101	5	8	1	109	6
Fram (loan)	2019	2. divisjon	7	2	0	0	7	2
Career total			111	7	8	1	119	8
