= Kristoffer Normann Hansen =

Norwegian footballer (born 1994)

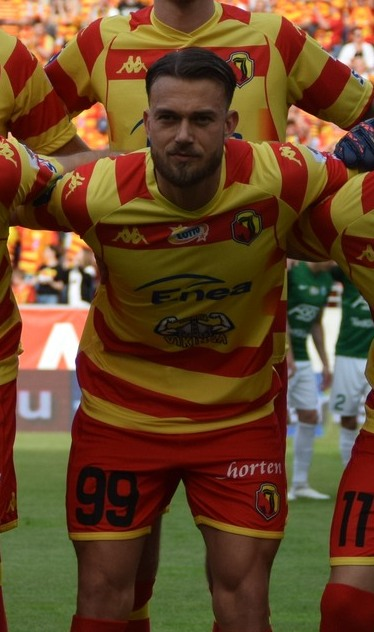
- Hansen in 2024 with Jagiellonia Białystok

Personal information
- Date of birth: 12 August 1994 (age 32)
- Place of birth: Larvik, Norway
- Height: 1.80 m (5 ft 11 in)
- Position: Winger

Team information
- Current team: Dalian K'un City
- Number: 10

Youth career
- Larvik TIF
- 2010: Sandefjord

Senior career*
Years	Team	Apps	(Gls)
2010–2016	Sandefjord	75	(10)
2016–2018	Sarpsborg 08	8	(0)
2018–2020	Ullensaker/Kisa	51	(19)
2020–2022	Sandefjord	50	(9)
2022–2023	Widzew Łódź	36	(5)
2023–2025	Jagiellonia Białystok	57	(12)
2025–2026	Thep Xanh Nam Dinh	0	(0)
2026–	Dalian K'un City	24	(5)

International career
2010	Norway U16	4	(3)
2011	Norway U17	2	(0)
2014	Norway U21	4	(1)
- * Club domestic league appearances and goals as of 31 October 2026

Kristoffer Normann Hansen (born 12 August 1994) is a Norwegian professional footballer who plays as a winger for China League One club Dalian K'un City.

== Club career ==
=== Early career ===
He started his career in Larvik Turn, and joined the regional great team Sandefjord as a junior in 2010. He made his first team debut in 2011. Hansen would go on to play 83 matches for Sandefjord in all competitions, scoring 11 goals and recording six assists.

Between 2016 and 2020, he played for Sarpsborg 08 FF and Ullensaker/Kisa IL. On 16 January 2020, he returned to Sandefjord, with whom he competed at the Eliteserien level during the 2020 and 2021 seasons. During the 2021 season with Sandefjord, he appeared in 26 league matches contributing seven goals and a further eight assists.

=== Widzew Łódź ===
On 21 January 2022, Hansen moved abroad for the first time in his career and signed for Widzew Łódź in the Polish I liga until the end of the season. The deal included an option to extend the contract for a further two years. Hansen helped the club earn promotion to the Ekstraklasa, the highest division of Polish football, in his first season at the club. He terminated his contract with the club on 25 August 2023. During his time with Widzew, he made 36 appearances in league matches and one more in the Polish Cup, scoring five goals and recording three assists.

=== Jagiellonia Białystok ===
On 11 September 2023, he signed a one-year deal with Jagiellonia Białystok with the option to extend for another season. On 8 October 2023, he was awarded with the player of the match for his two-goal performance in a 4–2 win over Cracovia in the league.

On 25 May 2024, Hansen helped Jagiellonia win the Ekstraklasa title for the first time in the club's 104-year history, following a 3–0 win over Warta Poznań on the final day of the season.

On 7 November 2024, Hansen scored two goals in a 3–0 victory over Molde in the UEFA Conference League.

Hansen left Jagiellonia upon the expiration of his contract in June 2025.

== International career ==
In 2014, Hansen made four appearances in friendly matches for the Norway U21 side and scored one goal.

== Career statistics ==
As of match played 31 October 2026

Appearances and goals by club, season and competition
Club	Season	League			National cup (Note: Includes Norwegian Football Cup, Polish Cup, Vietnamese Cup)		Continental		Other		Total	
Club	Season	Division	Apps	Goals	Apps	Goals	Apps	Goals	Apps	Goals	Apps	Goals
Sandefjord	2010	Tippeligaen	0	0	0	0	—		—		0	0
Sandefjord	2011	1. divisjon	3	0	0	0	—		—		3	0
Sandefjord	2012	1. divisjon	3	0	0	0	—		—		3	0
Sandefjord	2013	1. divisjon	1	0	1	0	—		—		2	0
Sandefjord	2014	1. divisjon	28	6	2	0	—		—		30	6
Sandefjord	2015	Tippeligaen	26	2	4	1	—		—		30	3
Sandefjord	2016	1. divisjon	14	2	2	0	—		—		16	2
Sandefjord	Total		75	10	9	1	—		—		84	11
Sarpsborg 08	2016	Tippeligaen	4	0	1	0	—		—		5	0
Sarpsborg 08	2017	Eliteserien	4	0	1	0	—		—		5	0
Sarpsborg 08	Total		8	0	2	0	—		—		10	0
Ullensaker/Kisa	2018	1. divisjon	29	13	4	0	—		—		33	13
Ullensaker/Kisa	2019	1. divisjon	22	6	2	0	—		—		24	6
Ullensaker/Kisa	Total		51	19	6	0	—		—		57	19
Sandefjord	2020	Eliteserien	24	2	0	0	—		—		24	2
Sandefjord	2021	Eliteserien	26	7	1	0	—		—		27	7
Sandefjord	Total		50	9	1	0	—		—		51	9
Widzew Łódź	2021–22	I liga	13	2	0	0	—		—		13	2
Widzew Łódź	2022–23	Ekstraklasa	23	3	1	0	—		—		24	3
Widzew Łódź	Total		36	5	1	0	—		—		37	5
Jagiellonia Białystok	2023–24	Ekstraklasa	26	9	4	0	—		—		30	9
Jagiellonia Białystok	2024–25	Ekstraklasa	31	3	2	2	18 (Note: Four appearances and one goal in UEFA Champions League, two appearances in UEFA Europa League, twelve appearances and four goals in UEFA Conference League)	5	1 (Note: Appearance in Polish Super Cup)	0	52	10
Jagiellonia Białystok	Total		57	12	6	2	18	5	1	0	82	19
Thep Xanh Nam Dinh	2025–26	V.League 1	—		—		6 (Note: Appearances in AFC Champions League Two)	1	1 (Note: Appearance in ASEAN Club Championship)	0	7	1
Dalian K'un City	2026	China League One	24	5	0	0	—		—		24	5
Career total			301	60	25	3	24	6	2	0	352	69

== Honours ==
Sandefjord

- 1. divisjon: 2014

Jagiellonia Białystok

- Ekstraklasa: 2023–24
- Polish Super Cup: 2024
