= Sander Moen Foss =

Norwegian footballer (born 1998)

Personal information
- Date of birth: 31 December 1998 (age 27)
- Position: Defender

Team information
- Current team: Lillestrøm
- Number: 5

Youth career
- Barkåker
- –2014: Stokke

Senior career*
| Years | Team | Apps | (Gls) |
| 2014 | Stokke | | |
| 2015 | Eik-Tønsberg | 17 | (0) |
| 2016–2023 | Sandefjord | 82 | (3) |
| 2016 | → FK Tønsberg (loan) | 6 | (0) |
| 2017 | → FK Tønsberg (loan) | 12 | (0) |
| 2024– | Lillestrøm | 39 | (3) |
- * Club domestic league appearances and goals as of 23 July 2026

Sander Moen Foss (born 31 December 1998) is a Norwegian footballer who plays as a defender for Lillestrøm.

== Career ==
Raised in Barkåker and Stokke, he made his senior debut there in 2014 before joining Eik-Tønsberg. In 2016 he went on to Sandefjord and made his debut in the cup. More cup games followed in 2018 and 2019, as well as loans to FK Tønsberg in 2016 and 2017. He made his league debut for Sandefjord in 2019, in 1. divisjon, and the Eliteserien debut in June 2020.

== Career statistics ==
As of 9 November 2025

Appearances and goals by club, season and competition
| Club | Season | League | | | National cup | | Total | |
| Club | Season | Division | Apps | Goals | Apps | Goals | Apps | Goals |
|---|---|---|---|---|---|---|---|---|
| Eik-Tønsberg | 2015 | 3. divisjon | 17 | 0 | 0 | 0 | 17 | 0 |
| Eik-Tønsberg | Total | | 17 | 0 | 0 | 0 | 17 | 0 |
| Sandefjord | 2016 | OBOS-ligaen | 0 | 0 | 1 | 0 | 1 | 0 |
| Sandefjord | 2018 | Eliteserien | 0 | 0 | 2 | 1 | 2 | 1 |
| Sandefjord | 2019 | OBOS-ligaen | 3 | 0 | 1 | 0 | 4 | 0 |
| Sandefjord | 2020 | Eliteserien | 20 | 1 | — | | 20 | 1 |
| Sandefjord | 2021 | Eliteserien | 28 | 2 | 1 | 0 | 29 | 2 |
| Sandefjord | 2022 | Eliteserien | 2 | 0 | 0 | 0 | 2 | 0 |
| Sandefjord | 2023 | Eliteserien | 29 | 0 | 1 | 0 | 30 | 0 |
| Sandefjord | Total | | 82 | 3 | 6 | 1 | 88 | 4 |
| Tønsberg (loan) | 2016 | PostNord-ligaen | 6 | 0 | 0 | 0 | 6 | 0 |
| Tønsberg (loan) | 2017 | Norsk Tipping-ligaen | 12 | 0 | 0 | 0 | 12 | 0 |
| Tønsberg (loan) | Total | | 18 | 0 | 0 | 0 | 18 | 0 |
| Lillestrøm | 2024 | Eliteserien | 14 | 1 | 2 | 1 | 16 | 2 |
| Lillestrøm | 2025 | OBOS-ligaen | 16 | 2 | 8 | 0 | 24 | 2 |
| Lillestrøm | Total | | 30 | 3 | 10 | 1 | 40 | 4 |
| Career total | | | 147 | 6 | 16 | 2 | 163 | 8 |
