= Jacob Storevik =

Norwegian footballer (born 1996)

Personal information
- Date of birth: 29 July 1996 (age 30)
- Place of birth: Førde, Norway
- Height: 1.88 m (6 ft 2 in)
- Position: Goalkeeper

Team information
- Current team: Ranheim
- Number: 1

Youth career
- –2011: Florø

Senior career*
Years	Team	Apps	(Gls)
2012	Florø	4	(0)
2012–2015	Rosenborg	0	(0)
2012–2015	→ Rosenborg 2	46	(0)
2015–2016	Levanger	2	(0)
2016–2018	Florø	12	(0)
2018–2022	Sandefjord	97	(0)
2023–2025	Vålerenga	18	(0)
2023–2024	→ Vålerenga 2	14	(0)
2024	→ Viking (loan)	5	(0)
2026–	Ranheim	28	(0)

International career
2011	Norway U15	1	(0)
2012	Norway U16	1	(0)
2013	Norway U17	1	(0)
2014	Norway U18	5	(0)
2014	Norway U19	1	(0)
- * Club domestic league appearances and goals as of 14 November 2026

Jacob Storevik (born 29 July 1996) is a Norwegian professional footballer who plays as a goalkeeper for Ranheim.

== Career ==
Storevik started his senior career in Florø in 2012 before leaving for Rosenborg later that year after having impressed Rosenborg at under 16 level and on trail for Rosenborg in the NextGen Series. Storevik's first match squad for Rosenborg was in the Europa League group stage game away at Bayer Leverkusen in 2012, he stayed on the bench the whole game. He was given jersey number 33 and was the third goalkeeper for Rosenborg for the 2014 season.

After spells on the second and third tier with Levanger and Florø he signed for second-tier Sandefjord ahead of the 2019 season. Securing promotion, he played the season opener of the 2020 Eliteserien.

In December 2022, he signed for Vålerenga. In October 2024, he was loaned out to Viking until the end of the season.

== Career statistics ==
As of 14 November 2026

Appearances and goals by club, season and competition
Club	Season	League			National Cup		Other		Total	
Club	Season	Division	Apps	Goals	Apps	Goals	Apps	Goals	Apps	Goals
Florø	2012	3. divisjon	4	0	0	0	—		4	0
Rosenborg 2	2012	2. divisjon	4	0	—				4	0
Rosenborg 2	2013	2. divisjon	17	0	—				17	0
Rosenborg 2	2014	2. divisjon	19	0	—				19	0
Rosenborg 2	2015	3. divisjon	6	0	—				6	0
Rosenborg 2	Total		46	0	—				46	0
Levanger	2015	1. divisjon	1	0	0	0	—		1	0
Levanger	2016	1. divisjon	1	0	0	0	—		1	0
Levanger	Total		2	0	0	0	—		2	0
Florø	2016	2. divisjon	1	0	0	0	—		1	0
Florø	2017	1. divisjon	2	0	2	0	—		4	0
Florø	2018	1. divisjon	9	0	2	0	—		11	0
Florø	Total		12	0	4	0	—		16	0
Sandefjord	2018	1. divisjon	0	0	0	0	—		0	0
Sandefjord	2019	1. divisjon	17	0	3	0	—		20	0
Sandefjord	2020	Eliteserien	30	0	—		—		30	0
Sandefjord	2021	Eliteserien	30	0	0	0	—		30	0
Sandefjord	2022	Eliteserien	20	0	0	0	2 (Note: Appearance(s) in Eliteserien play-offs)	0	22	0
Sandefjord	Total		97	0	3	0	2	0	102	0
Vålerenga	2023	Eliteserien	11	0	6	0	1	0	18	0
Vålerenga	2024	1. divisjon	0	0	4	0	—		4	0
Vålerenga	2025	Eliteserien	5	0	1	0	0	0	6	0
Vålerenga	Total		16	0	11	0	1	0	18	0
Vålerenga 2	2023	2. divisjon	7	0	—				7	0
Vålerenga 2	2024	2. divisjon	7	0	—				7	0
Vålerenga 2	Total		14	0	—				14	0
Viking (loan)	2024	Eliteserien	5	0	0	0	—		5	0
Ranheim	2026	1. divisjon	28	0	2	0	—		30	0
Career total			224	0	20	0	3	0	247	0
