= William Kurtovic =

Swedish footballer

Personal information
- Full name: William Albin Kurtovic
- Date of birth: 22 June 1996 (age 30)
- Place of birth: Karlskrona, Sweden
- Height: 1.89 m (6 ft 2 1/2 in)
- Position: Midfielder

Team information
- Current team: Lyn
- Number: 22

Youth career
- –2015: Sandefjord

Senior career*
Years	Team	Apps	(Gls)
2014–2022	Sandefjord	170	(10)
2018	→ Ullensaker/Kisa (loan)	11	(1)
2023–2024	HamKam	48	(0)
2025	Eik Tønsberg	10	(2)
2026–	Lyn	13	(0)

International career^{‡}
2015–2016	Sweden U19	3	(0)
- * Club domestic league appearances and goals as of 14 November 2026 ‡ National team caps and goals as of 28 July 2017

William Albin Kurtovic (born 22 June 1996) is a Swedish footballer who plays for Lyn.

== Career ==
=== Club ===
In September 2015, Kurtovic signed a new contract with Sandefjord until the end of the 2018 season.

In February 2023, Kurtovic signed a two-year contract with HamKam.

On 4 March 2026, Kurtovic signed a contract with Lyn Fotball.

== Personal life ==
Kurtovic was born in Sweden to Marinko Kurtović, a Croatian handball coach, and a Swedish mother, and moved to Norway at a young age. His sister is professional handballer Amanda Kurtović, who represents Norway internationally.

== Career statistics ==
=== Club ===
As of 14 November 2026

Appearances and goals by club, season and competition
Club	Season	League			National Cup		Other		Total	
Club	Season	Division	Apps	Goals	Apps	Goals	Apps	Goals	Apps	Goals
Sandefjord	2014	1. divisjon	4	0	2	0	—		6	0
Sandefjord	2015	Eliteserien	13	0	1	0	—		14	0
Sandefjord	2016	1. divisjon	28	2	5	0	—		33	2
Sandefjord	2017	Eliteserien	19	0	0	0	—		19	0
Sandefjord	2018	Eliteserien	11	1	0	0	—		11	1
Sandefjord	2019	1. divisjon	26	3	3	0	—		29	3
Sandefjord	2020	Eliteserien	19	0	—		—		19	0
Sandefjord	2021	Eliteserien	24	2	2	0	—		26	2
Sandefjord	2022	Eliteserien	26	2	3	0	2 (Note: Appearances in Eliteserien play-offs)	1	31	3
Sandefjord	Total		170	10	16	0	2	1	188	11
Ullensaker/Kisa (loan)	2018	1. divisjon	11	1	3	1	—		14	2
Ullensaker/Kisa (loan)	Total		11	1	3	1	—		14	2
HamKam	2023	Eliteserien	26	0	5	0	—		31	0
HamKam	2024	Eliteserien	22	0	2	0	—		24	0
HamKam	Total		48	0	7	0	—		55	0
Eik Tønsberg	2025	2. divisjon	10	2	1	0	—		11	2
Lyn	2026	1. divisjon	13	0	2	0	—		15	0
Career total			252	13	29	1	2	1	283	15

== Honours ==
Sandefjord

- 1. divisjon (1): 2014
