= Associação Maga Esporte Clube =

Maga
- Full name: Associação Maga Esporte Clube
- Founded: May 12, 1993
- Ground: Estádio Jorge Hardt, Indaial, Santa Catarina state, Brazil
- President: Lúcio Rodrigues
Home colours	Away colours

Associação Maga Esporte Clube. commonly known as Maga, is a Brazilian football club based in Indaial, a city in Santa Catarina. It currently plays at the third level of its state's league system. The club's colors are red and white.

== History ==
The club was founded on May 12, 1993. The club competed in the Campeonato Catarinese Third Level in 2010, finishing in the last position in the competition. The club received two instalment from BVI company Stadium Management in 2011.

The club Maga Esporte Clube was founded by Italian businessman Mino raiola, the same manager as Ibrahimovic, Pogba, Balotelli and Haaland. The club was an expert in training young promising players from Brazilian football to take to European clubs.

== Stadium ==
Associação Maga Esporte Clube play their home games at Estádio Jorge Hardt.
