= Zé Eduardo (footballer, born 1991) =

Brazilian footballer

Personal information
- Full name: José Eduardo de Araújo
- Date of birth: 16 August 1991 (age 35)
- Place of birth: Uberaba, Brazil
- Height: 1.86 m (6 ft 1 in)
- Position: Midfielder

Youth career
- 2003–2008: Cruzeiro

Senior career*
Years	Team	Apps	(Gls)
2008–2009	Cruzeiro	1	(0)
2009–2010	Maga	0	(0)
2009–2010	→ Ajax (loan)	0	(0)
2010–2011	→ Parma (loan)	2	(0)
2011–2014	Parma	4	(0)
2012	→ Empoli (loan)	14	(0)
2012–2013	→ Padova (loan)	33	(4)
2013–2014	→ OFI (loan)	33	(3)
2014–2016	Cesena	13	(1)
2015–2016	→ Lanciano (loan)	16	(0)
2016–2017	Bragantino	0	(0)
2017	Boavista	0	(0)
2017–2019	FC Wil	53	(4)
2020–2021	Sandefjord	22	(1)
2023	Maguary	6	(0)
2023	Banga	7	(0)

International career
2008	Brazil U19		
2009–2011	Brazil U20		
- * Club domestic league appearances and goals as of 28 February 2024

José Eduardo de Araújo (born 16 August 1991), or simply Zé Eduardo, is a Brazilian professional footballer who plays as a defensive midfielder. He can also play at full-back or on either wing, but sees central midfield as his strongest position.

== Club career ==
Zé Eduardo began his career in 2003 with Cruzeiro Esporte Clube. He made his debut in the last match of the 2008 Campeonato Brasileiro Série A, replacing Henrique in the final minutes.

In August 2009, Zé Eduardo joined Associação Maga Esporte Clube (which was effectively an investing company) for €500,000 and signed a five-year contract. Maga held 75% of his transfer rights while Cruzeiro held the remaining 25%.

On 31 August 2009, he was loaned to Ajax. On 9 June 2010, Ajax chose not to activate the option to buy Zé Eduardo, and he moved back to Associação Maga Esporte Clube.

In July 2010, he joined Italian Serie A side Parma on loan from Maga for €500,000 and was called up to pre-season camp. He was a member of its youth team, though was also awarded the number 22 shirt of the first team. He played in 2011 Torneo di Viareggio.

In July 2012, he joined Serie B side Padova on loan.

In August 2013, he moved to Greek club OFI on loan.

In July 2014, Zé Eduardo joined Cesena for an undisclosed fee.

On 8 August 2015, Zé Eduardo joined Lanciano in a temporary deal.

On 10 March 2020, Zé Eduardo joined Sandefjord on a one-year contract.

== International career ==
Ze Eduardo is also former Brazil U-19 member and played for the Brazil national under-20 football team from 2009 to 2011. Dudu was formerly member of the U-16 of his homeland Brazil.

== Honours ==
- South American Youth Championship: 2009, 2011
- Sendai Cup: 2008
