= Sivert Gussiås =

Norwegian footballer (born 1999)

Personal information
- Full name: Sivert Stenseth Gussiås
- Date of birth: 11 August 1999 (age 27)
- Place of birth: Molde, Norway
- Height: 1.83 m (6 ft 0 in)
- Position: Forward

Team information
- Current team: Træff
- Number: 8

Youth career
- 2012–2018: Molde

Senior career*
| Years | Team | Apps | (Gls) |
| 2018–2019 | Molde | 0 | (0) |
| 2019 | → Strømmen (loan) | 28 | (12) |
| 2020–2022 | Sandefjord | 57 | (8) |
| 2023 | KÍ | 23 | (3) |
| 2024 | Panevėžys | 30 | (2) |
| 2025– | Træff | 43 | (6) |
- * Club domestic league appearances and goals as of 15 November 2026

Sivert Stenseth Gussiås (born 11 August 1999) is a Norwegian footballer who plays as a forward for Træff in the Norwegian Second Division.

== Club career ==
=== Molde ===
Gussiås made his debut for Molde on 18 April 2018 in a 2018 Norwegian Cup game against Træff, a game Molde won 6–1. He signed a professional contract with Molde on 21 August 2018, which expired at the end of the 2019 season.

=== Strømmen (loan) ===
On 22 December 2018, Molde announced that Gussiås in the 2019 season would be loaned out to second tier club Strømmen. He got his debut for the club in the season opener on 31 March 2019 in a 1–1 home draw with Ullensaker/Kisa. In the 61st minute of the game, Gussiås scored the equalising goal on a penalty. From 26 May to 16 June, he scored for Strømmen in three consecutive league matches.

=== Sandefjord ===
On 8 January 2020, Sandefjord Fotball announced that Gussiås had signed a three-year contract with the club.

=== Panevėžys ===
On 30 March 2024 Panevėžys announced his signing for the club. On the same day, Gussiås made his debut in A lyga against FC Hegelmann. FK Panevėžys loss this match (2-4).

== Career statistics ==
As of match played 23 July 2026

Appearances and goals by club, season and competition
| Club | Season | League | | | National Cup | | Continental | | Total | |
| Club | Season | Division | Apps | Goals | Apps | Goals | Apps | Goals | Apps | Goals |
|---|---|---|---|---|---|---|---|---|---|---|
| Molde | 2018 | Eliteserien | 0 | 0 | 1 | 0 | — | | 1 | 0 |
| Molde | Total | | 0 | 0 | 1 | 0 | — | | 1 | 0 |
| Strømmen (loan) | 2019 | First Division | 28 | 12 | 3 | 1 | — | | 31 | 13 |
| Strømmen (loan) | Total | | 28 | 12 | 3 | 1 | — | | 31 | 13 |
| Sandefjord | 2020 | Eliteserien | 30 | 7 | – | | — | | 30 | 7 |
| Sandefjord | 2021 | Eliteserien | 12 | 1 | 1 | 1 | — | | 13 | 2 |
| Sandefjord | 2022 | Eliteserien | 15 | 0 | 3 | 1 | — | | 18 | 1 |
| Sandefjord | Total | | 57 | 8 | 4 | 2 | — | | 61 | 10 |
| KÍ Klaksvík | 2023 | Faroe Islands Premier League | 23 | 3 | 1 | 0 | 14 | 0 | 38 | 3 |
| Panevėžys | 2024 | A Lyga | 30 | 2 | 1 | 0 | 6 | 2 | 37 | 4 |
| Træff | 2025 | Norwegian Second Division | 23 | 5 | 3 | 1 | 0 | 0 | 26 | 6 |
| Træff | 2026 | Norwegian Second Division | 11 | 1 | 0 | 0 | 0 | 0 | 11 | 1 |
| Træff | Total | | 34 | 6 | 3 | 1 | 0 | 0 | 37 | 7 |
| Career total | | | 172 | 31 | 13 | 4 | 20 | 2 | 205 | 37 |
