= Peder Meen Johansen =

Norwegian footballer (born 2003)

Personal information
- Date of birth: 27 August 2003 (age 23)
- Height: 1.95 m (6 ft 5 in)
- Position: Midfielder

Team information
- Current team: Tromsdalen
- Number: 28

Youth career
- –2017: Store Bergan
- 2018–2020: Sandefjord

Senior career*
Years	Team	Apps	(Gls)
2020–2022	Sandefjord	8	(0)
2022–2023	Grorud	39	(0)
2024–	Tromsdalen	75	(2)
- * Club domestic league appearances and goals as of 15 November 2026

Peder Meen Johansen (born 27 August 2003) is a Norwegian football midfielder who plays for Tromsdalen.

Starting his career in local Sandefjord club Store Bergan IL, he joined Sandefjord Fotball's junior setup in 2018. He was promoted to the senior squad in 2020 and made his Eliteserien debut in June 2020 against Haugesund.
