= Tito (footballer, born May 1985) =

Spanish footballer

Personal information
- Full name: Alberto Ortiz Moreno
- Date of birth: 24 May 1985 (age 41)
- Place of birth: Santa Coloma, Spain
- Height: 1.83 m (6 ft 0 in)
- Position: Defensive midfielder

Youth career
- Gramenet

Senior career*
Years	Team	Apps	(Gls)
2004–2005	Gramenet B		
2005–2007	Gramenet	70	(2)
2007–2010	Espanyol B	63	(1)
2008–2009	→ Legia Warsaw (loan)	2	(0)
2010–2011	Benidorm	30	(2)
2011–2016	Llagostera	159	(3)
2016–2017	UCAM Murcia	30	(4)
2017–2018	Reus	29	(0)
2019	Sandefjord	26	(2)
Total		409	(14)
- * Club domestic league appearances and goals

Alberto Ortiz Moreno (born 24 May 1985), known as Tito, is a Spanish former professional footballer who played as a defensive midfielder.

== Club career ==
Born in Santa Coloma de Gramenet, Barcelona, Catalonia, Tito's professional input in his country consisted of 120 Segunda División matches and five goals over four seasons in service of UE Llagostera, UCAM Murcia CF and CF Reus Deportiu. His first appearance in that tier took place on 23 August 2014 in a 2–0 away loss against UD Las Palmas as a Llagostera player, and he scored his first goal the following 2 May for the same club to close the 2–2 draw at Real Betis.

Abroad, Tito competed in the Polish Ekstraklasa with Legia Warsaw and the Norwegian First Division with Sandefjord Fotball.
