= Erik Næsbak Brenden =

Norwegian footballer (born 1994)

Personal information
- Full name: Erik Næsbak Brenden
- Date of birth: 7 January 1994 (age 32)
- Place of birth: Elverum Municipality, Norway
- Height: 1.83 m (6 ft 0 in)
- Position: Midfielder

Team information
- Current team: Mjøndalen
- Number: 19

Youth career
- Elverum
- –2011: Nybergsund

Senior career*
Years	Team	Apps	(Gls)
2011–2015	Nybergsund	109	(21)
2016–2019	Lillestrøm	62	(2)
2020–2021	Sandefjord	45	(4)
2022–2023	Jerv	42	(5)
2024–	Mjøndalen	27	(3)

International career
2012	Norway U-18	4	(1)
- * Club domestic league appearances and goals as of 14 November 2024

Erik Næsbak Brenden (born 7 January 1994) is a Norwegian footballer who plays for Mjøndalen.

He signed for the club on 27 January 2022.
