= Martin Kreuzriegler =

Austrian footballer

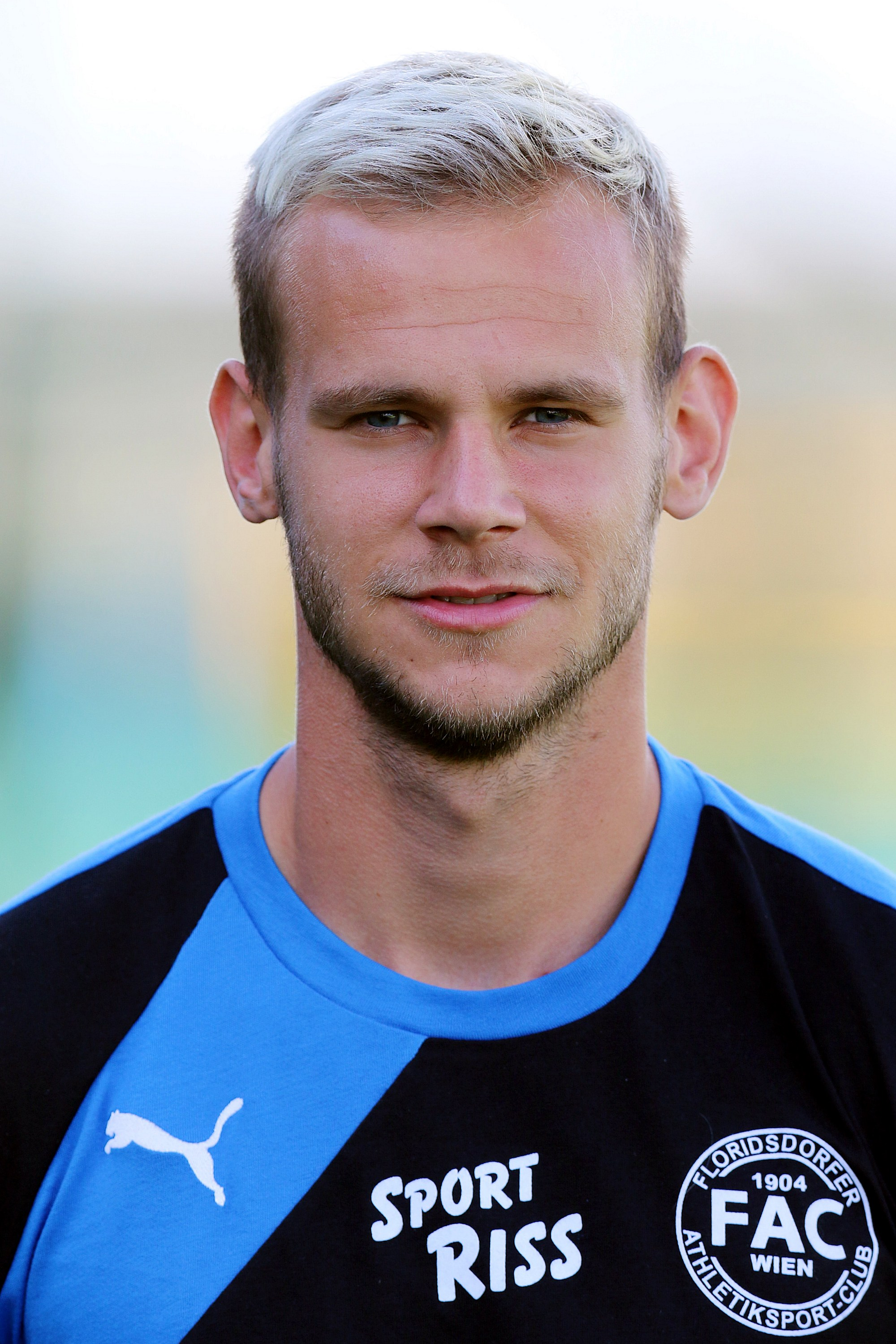
- Kreuzriegler in 2016

Personal information
- Date of birth: 10 January 1994 (age 32)
- Place of birth: Austria
- Height: 1.85 m (6 ft 1 in)
- Position: Centre-back

Team information
- Current team: SV Ried II

Youth career
- 2002–2008: SV Reichraming
- 2008–2012: AKA Linz

Senior career*
Years	Team	Apps	(Gls)
2012–2014	Blau-Weiß Linz	30	(0)
2014–2015	SV Horn	25	(0)
2015–2016	Austria Lustenau	12	(0)
2016–2017	Floridsdorfer AC	32	(2)
2017–2018	Hibernians	25	(1)
2018–2020	Blau-Weiß Linz	48	(5)
2020–2021	Sandefjord	51	(2)
2022–2023	Widzew Łódź	43	(3)
2023–2024	Vålerenga	16	(1)
2024–2026	Grazer AK	32	(0)
2026–	SV Ried II	4	(0)

International career
2009	Austria U16	2	(0)
2010	Austria U17	2	(0)
2011	Austria U18	1	(0)
2012	Austria U19	2	(0)
- * Club domestic league appearances and goals as of 15 August 2026

Martin Kreuzriegler (born 10 January 1994) is an Austrian professional footballer who plays as a centre-back for Austrian Regionalliga team SV Ried II.

== Career ==
=== FC Blau-Weiß Linz ===
After one season in Malta with Hibernians, Kreuzriegler returned to FC Blau-Weiß Linz in June 2018 on a two-year deal.
