= George Gibson (footballer, born 2000) =

Norwegian footballer

Personal information
- Full name: George Nuah Gibson
- Date of birth: 17 August 2000 (age 26)
- Place of birth: Vadsø, Norway
- Position: Forward

Team information
- Current team: PO Xylotymbou

Youth career
- –2016: Flint
- 2016–2017: Sandefjord

Senior career*
| Years | Team | Apps | (Gls) |
| 2016 | Flint | | |
| 2018–2020 | Sandefjord | 34 | (1) |
| 2021 | Øygarden | 7 | (0) |
| 2021 | → Florø (loan) | 17 | (5) |
| 2022– | PO Xylotymbou | | |

International career^{‡}
| 2018 | Norway U18 | 3 | (0) |
| 2019 | Norway U19 | 1 | (0) |
- * Club domestic league appearances and goals as of 1 January 2022 ‡ National team caps and goals as of 1 January 2022

George Nuah Gibson (born 17 August 2000) is a Norwegian footballer who plays for PO Xylotymbou.

From Tønsberg, he started his youth career with IL Flint before joining Sandefjord's youth system in summer 2016. In 2018, he made his senior first-team debut, being Sandefjord's first player born in the 2000s, and was also selected for Norway's youth national team. He left Sandefjord after the 2020 season and subsequently joined Norwegian Second Division club Øygarden. He only made seven appearances for Øygarden before moving to Florø in August 2021. In the winter of 2022 he moved abroad, to Cypriot second-tier side PO Xylotymbou.
