= Marcos Celorrio =

Spanish footballer

Personal information
- Full name: Marcos Celorrio Yécora
- Date of birth: 19 February 1997 (age 29)
- Place of birth: Logroño, Spain
- Height: 1.83 m (6 ft 0 in)
- Position: Forward

Youth career
- 2009–2017: Real Sociedad

Senior career*
Years	Team	Apps	(Gls)
2017–2020	Real Sociedad B	46	(6)
2020	→ Calahorra (loan)	5	(0)
2020–2021	Sandefjord	14	(1)
- * Club domestic league appearances and goals as of 18 September 2020

Marcos Celorrio Yécora (born 19 February 1997) is a Spanish footballer who plays as a forward.

== Club career ==
Born in Logroño, Celorrio completed his youth career with Real Sociedad. In January 2020, he moved to Calahorra on loan for the remainder of the season. On 18 June 2020, he signed a one-year contract with Norwegian club Sandefjord.

In September 2021, Sandefjord agreed to terminate his contract following the player's request to return to Spain.

== Career statistics ==
=== Club ===
As of match played 27 May 2021

Appearances and goals by club, season and competition
Club	Season	League			National Cup		Europe		Total	
Club	Season	Division	Apps	Goals	Apps	Goals	Apps	Goals	Apps	Goals
Real Sociedad B	2017–18	Segunda División B	23	5	0	0	-		23	5
Real Sociedad B	2018–19	Segunda División B	21	1	0	0	-		21	1
Real Sociedad B	2019–20	Segunda División B	2	0	0	0	-		2	0
Real Sociedad B	Total		46	6	0	0	-	-	46	6
Calahorra (loan)	2018–19	Segunda División B	5	0	0	0	-		5	0
Calahorra (loan)	Total		5	0	0	0	-	-	5	0
Sandefjord	2020	Eliteserien	13	1	0	0	-		13	1
Sandefjord	2021	Eliteserien	1	0	0	0	-		1	0
Sandefjord	Total		14	1	0	0	-	-	14	1
Career total			65	7	0	0	-	-	65	7
