= Ole Breistøl =

Norwegian footballer (born 1998)

Personal information
- Date of birth: 11 July 1998 (age 28)
- Place of birth: Sandefjord, Norway
- Height: 1.85 m (6 ft 1 in)
- Position: Left winger

Team information
- Current team: Lyn
- Number: 26

Youth career
- –2014: Sandefjord BK
- 2015–2017: Sandefjord

Senior career*
Years	Team	Apps	(Gls)
2017–2019	Sandefjord	7	(0)
2019	→ Fram Larvik (loan)	24	(1)
2020–2021	Ull/Kisa	28	(0)
2022–2023	Lyn	50	(13)
2024–	Lyn	9	(0)
- * Club domestic league appearances and goals as of 14 November 2024

Ole Breistøl (born 11 July 1998) is a Norwegian footballer who plays for Lyn.

== Career ==
=== Ull/Kisa ===
On 13 January 2020 Ullensaker/Kisa IL confirmed, that Breistøl had joined the club on a deal until the end of 2021.

At the end of 2023, Breistøl made a decision to prioritize studies in Denmark over football. In May 2024, Breistøl returned to play for Lyn.
