= Lars Markmanrud =

Norwegian footballer (born 2001)

Personal information
- Date of birth: 1 March 2001 (age 25)
- Position: Defender

Team information
- Current team: NSÍ Runavík
- Number: 3

Youth career
- –2016: Store Bergan
- 2017–2020: Sandefjord

Senior career*
Years	Team	Apps	(Gls)
2020–2023	Sandefjord	41	(2)
2023	→ Egersund (loan)	18	(2)
2024	Jerv	18	(0)
2025–	NSÍ Runavík	23	(0)
- * Club domestic league appearances and goals as of 26 October 2025

Lars Markmanrud (born 1 March 2001) is a Norwegian professional footballer who plays for NSÍ Runavík.

== Career ==
Starting his career in local Sandefjord club Store Bergan IL, he joined Sandefjord Fotball's junior setup in 2017.

He was promoted to the senior squad in 2020 and made his Eliteserien debut in June 2020 against Odd.

In June 2023 he went on loan to Egersunds IK.

In the beginning of 2025, Markmansrud signed with Faroe Islands Premier League club NSÍ Runavík on a contract for the rest of the year.
