= Viðar Ari Jónsson =

Icelandic footballer (born 1994)

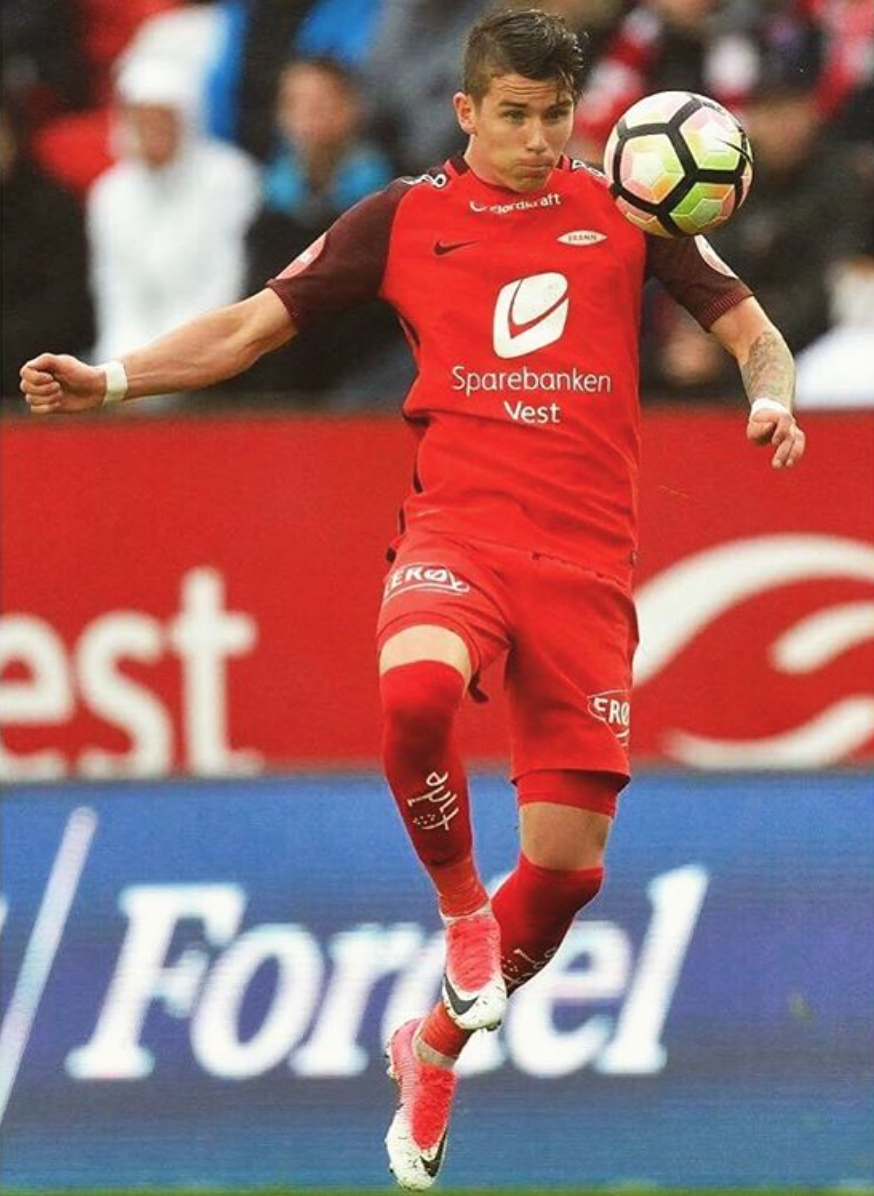

Personal information
- Date of birth: 10 March 1994 (age 32)
- Place of birth: Iceland
- Height: 1.84 m (6 ft 0 in)
- Positions: Right midfielder; right back

Team information
- Current team: HamKam
- Number: 7

Youth career
- –2010: Þróttur Reykjavík
- 2010–2011: Fjölnir

Senior career*
| Years | Team | Apps | (Gls) |
| 2011–2017 | Fjölnir | 85 | (5) |
| 2017–2018 | Brann | 11 | (1) |
| 2018 | → FH (loan) | 18 | (0) |
| 2019–2021 | Sandefjord | 81 | (14) |
| 2022–2023 | Budapest Honvéd | 28 | (1) |
| 2023 | FH | 4 | (1) |
| 2023– | HamKam | 58 | (6) |

International career^{‡}
| 2012 | Iceland U-19 | 1 | (0) |
| 2015–2016 | Iceland U-21 | 7 | (0) |
| 2017– | Iceland | 7 | (0) |
- * Club domestic league appearances and goals as of 23 July 2026 ‡ National team caps and goals as of 12 March 2022

Viðar Ari Jónsson (born 10 March 1994) is an Icelandic professional footballer who plays for Norwegian club HamKam as a right midfielder.

== Career ==
Viðar, who began his career with Þróttur Reykjavík and spent 7 years with Fjölnir, signed for Eliteserien club Brann on 6 March 2017.

On 18 January 2019, Jónsson signed with Sandefjord for three years.

On 15 February 2022, Viðar Ari signed a 1.5-year contract with Budapest Honvéd in Hungary.

In August 2023, he signed a contract with FH from his home country, but just after one month he moved to Norway, to play for HamKam in Eliteserien.

== International career ==
Viðar has been involved with the U-19 and U-21 teams, and made his senior team debut against Chile at the 2017 China Cup.

== Career statistics ==
=== Club ===
As of 3 August 2025

| Club | Season | League | | | National Cup | | European | | Total | |
| Club | Season | Division | Apps | Goals | Apps | Goals | Apps | Goals | Apps | Goals |
|---|---|---|---|---|---|---|---|---|---|---|
| Ungmennafélagið Fjölnir | 2011 | 1. deild karla | 2 | 1 | 0 | 0 | - | | 2 | 1 |
| Ungmennafélagið Fjölnir | 2012 | 1. deild karla | 17 | 3 | 0 | 0 | - | | 17 | 3 |
| Ungmennafélagið Fjölnir | 2013 | 1. deild karla | 13 | 0 | 0 | 0 | - | | 13 | 0 |
| Ungmennafélagið Fjölnir | 2014 | Úrvalsdeild | 10 | 0 | 2 | 0 | - | | 12 | 0 |
| Ungmennafélagið Fjölnir | 2015 | Úrvalsdeild | 22 | 0 | 3 | 0 | - | | 25 | 0 |
| Ungmennafélagið Fjölnir | 2016 | Úrvalsdeild | 21 | 1 | 1 | 0 | - | | 22 | 1 |
| Ungmennafélagið Fjölnir | Fjölnir total | | 85 | 5 | 6 | 0 | - | - | 91 | 5 |
| Brann | 2017 | Eliteserien | 11 | 1 | 3 | 0 | - | | 14 | 1 |
| Brann | Brann total | | 11 | 1 | 3 | 0 | - | - | 14 | 1 |
| FH (loan) | 2018 | Úrvalsdeild | 18 | 0 | 2 | 0 | 4 | 0 | 24 | 0 |
| FH (loan) | FH total | | 19 | 0 | 2 | 0 | 4 | 0 | 25 | 0 |
| Sandefjord | 2019 | OBOS-ligaen | 25 | 1 | 3 | 1 | - | | 28 | 2 |
| Sandefjord | 2020 | Eliteserien | 27 | 2 | 0 | 0 | - | | 27 | 2 |
| Sandefjord | 2021 | Eliteserien | 29 | 11 | 2 | 2 | - | | 31 | 13 |
| Sandefjord | Sandefjord total | | 81 | 14 | 5 | 3 | - | - | 86 | 17 |
| Budapest Honvéd | 2021–22 | Nemzeti Bajnokság I | 6 | 0 | 1 | 0 | - | | 7 | 0 |
| Budapest Honvéd | Budapest Honvéd total | | 6 | 0 | 1 | 0 | - | - | 7 | 0 |
| HamKam | 2023 | Eliteserien | 2 | 1 | 0 | 0 | - | | 2 | 1 |
| HamKam | 2024 | Eliteserien | 21 | 2 | 4 | 2 | - | | 25 | 4 |
| HamKam | 2025 | Eliteserien | 13 | 2 | 4 | 2 | - | | 17 | 4 |
| HamKam | HamKam total | | 36 | 5 | 8 | 4 | - | - | 44 | 9 |
| Career total | | | 240 | 26 | 25 | 7 | 4 | 0 | 271 | 33 |
