= Herman Solberg Nilsen =

Norwegian footballer (born 1999)

Personal information
- Full name: Herman Solberg Nilsen
- Date of birth: 30 April 1999 (age 27)
- Place of birth: Norway
- Positions: Defender; midfielder

Team information
- Current team: Lyn
- Number: 18

Youth career
- –2016: Nanset
- 2016–2018: Sandefjord

Senior career*
| Years | Team | Apps | (Gls) |
| 2018–2021 | Sandefjord | 7 | (0) |
| 2018–2019 | → Fram (loan) | 28 | (2) |
| 2020 | → Kongsvinger (loan) | 5 | (0) |
| 2021 | → Fram (loan) | 26 | (1) |
| 2022– | Lyn | 134 | (15) |

International career
| 2017 | Norway U18 | 2 | (0) |
- * Club domestic league appearances and goals as of 14 November 2026

Herman Solberg Nilsen (born 30 April 1999) is a Norwegian footballer who plays for Lyn.

== Career ==
He started his youth career in Nanset IF. In the summer of 2018 he was loaned out from Sandefjord to crisis-stricken third-tier club IF Fram Larvik. The loan continued in 2019. 2020-season he was loaned out to Kongsvinger. Solberg Nilsen did only play 5 matches for Kongsvinger. In 2021 he returned to his hometown on a loan to club Fram Larvik.
