= Sandefjord Arena =

Football stadium in Sandefjord, Norway

Jotun Arena
- Interactive map of Jotun Arena
- Former names: Komplett.no Arena; Komplett Arena; Sandefjord Arena; Release Arena
- Location: Sandefjord, Vestfold, Norway
- Coordinates: 59°08′14″N 10°10′47″E
- Capacity: 6,582
- Surface: Natural grass
- Record attendance: 8,103, 21 July 2007
- Field size: 105 × 68 m

Construction
- Opened: 21 July 2007
- Cost: NOK 100 million

Tenant
- Sandefjord Fotball (2007–present)

Jotun Arena (previously called Komplett Arena for sponsorship reasons and Sandefjord Arena) is the current stadium of Sandefjord Fotball. It was opened on 21 July 2007, when Lyn visited Sandefjord, and is still the match with the highest attendance of 8,103.

In 2007, the stadium was named after a club sponsor, the local e-commerce company Komplett. It was named Komplett.no Arena and later Komplett Arena until the company withdrew their naming sponsorship in November 2019.

On 5 May 2021 the stadium was yet again renamed after local mobile phone retailer Release bought the rights.

On 5 September 2023 the stadium got renamed Jotun Arena after their local chemicals company and main sponsor.

== Attendance ==
	Eliteserien
†	1. divisjon

Attendance
Season	Avg	Min	Max	Rank	Ref
2007	6,802	5,439	8,103	11	
2008	4,095	3,436	5,272	3†	
2009	5,804	4,967	7,810	12	
2010	4,330	1,142	6,936	14	
2011	2,607	2,270	3,527	2†	
2012	2,582	1,995	5,272	3†	
2013	2,405	1,806	5,617	3†	
2014	2,587	2,014	5,054	3†	
2015	4,125	3,269	6,174	11	
2016	2,905	2,191	5,655	2†	
2017	4,012	3,034	6,103	12	
2018	3,136	2,461	5,319	15	
2019	2,480	1,809	5,174	3†	
