= Anton Kralj =

Swedish footballer

Personal information
- Full name: Anton Sebastian Kralj
- Date of birth: 12 March 1998 (age 28)
- Place of birth: Sweden
- Height: 1.65 m (5 ft 5 in)
- Position: Left-back

Team information
- Current team: Keflavík
- Number: 13

Youth career
- –2010: Kvarnby IK
- 2010–2017: Malmö FF

Senior career*
Years	Team	Apps	(Gls)
2017–2018	Malmö FF	0	(0)
2017–2018	→ Gefle IF (loan)	44	(2)
2019–2020	Sandefjord	51	(1)
2021–2022	Degerfors IF	33	(0)
2023–2024	Hammarby IF	11	(0)
2024	→ GIF Sundsvall (loan)	8	(0)
2025	Vestri	24	(1)
2026–	Keflavík	9	(0)

International career^{‡}
2014–2015	Sweden U17	17	(0)
2015–2018	Sweden U19	17	(0)
2020	Sweden U21	1	(0)
- * Club domestic league appearances and goals as of 1 November 2026 ‡ National team caps and goals as of 18 November 2020

Anton Sebastian Kralj (born 12 March 1998) is a Swedish footballer who plays as a left-back for Keflavík.

His father is Slovenian.

Kralj joined Vestri in 2025. On 22 August 2025, he won the Icelandic Cup with Vestri.
