= Emil Pálsson =

Icelandic footballer

Personal information
- Full name: Emil Pálsson
- Date of birth: 10 June 1993 (age 33)
- Place of birth: Ísafjörður, Iceland
- Height: 1.85 m (6 ft 1 in)
- Position: Midfielder

Youth career
- –2009: BÍ/Bolungarvík

Senior career*
Years	Team	Apps	(Gls)
2008–2010	BÍ/Bolungarvík	45	(5)
2011–2017	FH	114	(19)
2015	→ Fjölnir (loan)	9	(1)
2017–2021	Sandefjord	49	(0)
2021–2022	Sarpsborg 08	12	(0)
2021	→ Sogndal (loan)	11	(0)
Total		240	(25)

International career^{‡}
2009	Iceland U-17	7	(2)
2010–2011	Iceland U-19	8	(0)
2013–2014	Iceland U-21	7	(0)
2016	Iceland	1	(0)
- * Club domestic league appearances and goals as of 22 August 2021 ‡ National team caps and goals as of 1 November 2021

Emil Pálsson (born 10 June 1993) is an Icelandic former professional footballer who played as a midfielder. He played in his native Iceland from 2008 to 2017 and was named the Úrvalsdeild Player of the Year in 2015. He later played several seasons in Norway before severe heart problems ended his career prematurely in 2022. After playing for several of Iceland's junior national teams, he made his lone senior team cap in 2016.

== Playing career ==
=== Club career ===
Emil started his career with local club BÍ/Bolungarvík before signing with FH at 18 years old. In 2015, he was loaned to Fjölnir for the season. After stellar play with Fjölnir, he was recalled on 25 July and finished the season with FH. After the season he was named the Úrvalsdeild Player of the Year.

==== Cardiac arrest ====
On 1 November 2021, Emil collapsed and went into a cardiac arrest while playing for Sogndal in a match against Stjørdals-Blink. He was successfully resuscitated, and was then flown to Haukeland University Hospital for further investigation and treatment. He resumed training after being cleared by doctors with the aim of rejoining Sarpsborg 08. In May 2022, after training for 4–5 months, he collapsed again and suffered another cardiac arrest while doing light training with FH. In August 2022, he announced his retirement from football.

=== International career ===
Emil made his first senior international appearance on 16 January 2016 in a match against the UAE, playing 46 minutes before being substituted.

== Coaching career ==
Following his playing career, Emil went into coaching and later became an assistant coach at Breiðablik.

== Career statistics ==
As of match played on 22 August 2021

Appearances and goals by club, season and competition
Club	Season	League			Cup		League Cup		Other		Total	
Club	Season	Division	Apps	Goals	Apps	Goals	Apps	Goals	Apps	Goals	Apps	Goals
BÍ/Bolungarvík	2010	2. deild karla	0	0	1	0	—		—		1	0
FH	2011	Úrvalsdeild	10	2	0	0	—		—		10	2
FH	2012	Úrvalsdeild	16	2	1	0	—		4	0	21	2
FH	2013	Úrvalsdeild	18	1	1	0	—		7	0	26	1
FH	2014	Úrvalsdeild	21	2	1	0	—		6	0	28	2
FH	2015	Úrvalsdeild	12	6	1	0	—		4	0	17	6
FH	2016	Úrvalsdeild	20	5	4	3	—		3	0	27	8
FH	2017	Úrvalsdeild	17	1	5	2	—		7	1	29	4
FH	Total		114	19	13	5	0	0	31	1	158	25
Fjölnir (loan)	2015	Úrvalsdeild	9	1	1	0	—		—		10	1
Sandefjord	2018	Eliteserien	18	0	1	0	—		—		19	0
Sandefjord	2019	OBOS-ligaen	7	0	0	0	—		—		7	0
Sandefjord	2020	Eliteserien	24	0	0	0	—		—		24	0
Sandefjord	Total		49	0	1	0	—	—	—	—	50	0
Sarpsborg 08	2021	Eliteserien	12	0	1	0	—		—		13	0
Sogndal (loan)	2021	OBOS-ligaen	11	0	0	0	—		—		11	0
Career total			185	20	17	5	0	0	31	1	233	26
