= Lars Grorud =

Norwegian footballer (born 1983)

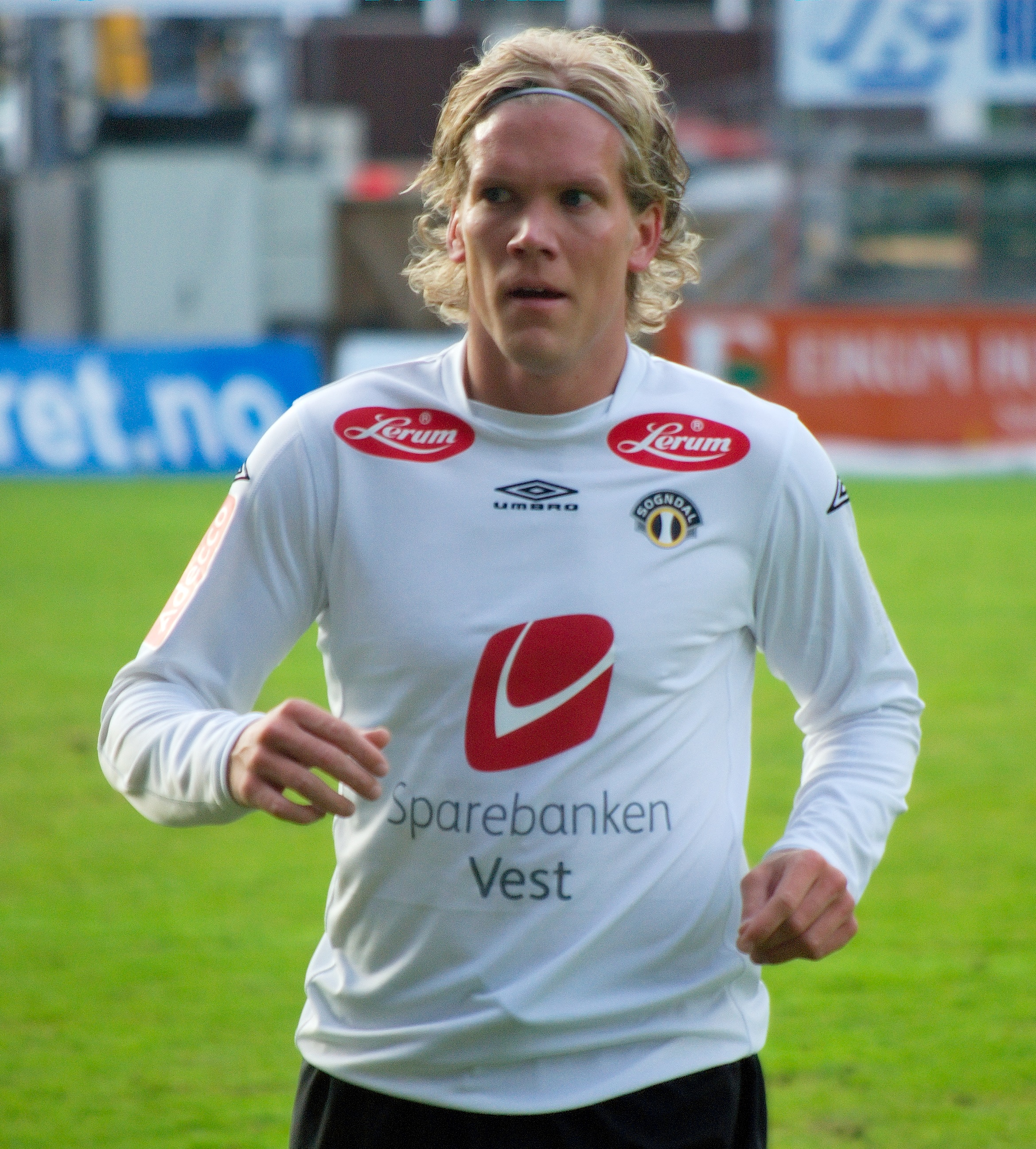

Personal information
- Date of birth: 2 July 1983 (age 43)
- Place of birth: Tønsberg, Norway
- Height: 1.88 m (6 ft 2 in)
- Position: Centre back

Senior career*
Years	Team	Apps	(Gls)
2000–2001	Eik-Tønsberg		
2002–2007	Tønsberg		
2008–2010	Sogndal	83	(3)
2011–2012	Brann	28	(3)
2012–2014	Fredrikstad	64	(3)
2015	Fram Larvik	13	(1)
2015–2020	Sandefjord	99	(3)
- * Club domestic league appearances and goals as of 22 December 2020

Lars Grorud (born 2 July 1983) is a retired Norwegian football defender.

He joined Brann at the start of the 2011 season.

== Career statistics ==
=== Club ===
As of match played 22 December 2020

Appearances and goals by club, season and competition
Club	Season	League			National Cup		Europe		Total	
Club	Season	Division	Apps	Goals	Apps	Goals	Apps	Goals	Apps	Goals
Sogndal	2008	1. divisjon	27	1	1	0	-		28	1
Sogndal	2009	1. divisjon	30	1	1	0	-		31	1
Sogndal	2010	1. divisjon	26	1	5	1	-		31	2
Sogndal	Total		83	3	7	1	-	-	90	4
Brann	2011	Tippeligaen	21	3	7	0	-		28	3
Brann	2012	Tippeligaen	7	0	1	0	-		8	0
Brann	Total		28	3	8	0	-	-	36	3
Fredrikstad	2012	Tippeligaen	10	0	0	0	-		10	0
Fredrikstad	2013	1. divisjon	28	3	1	0	-		29	3
Fredrikstad	2014	1. divisjon	26	0	1	0	-		27	0
Fredrikstad	Total		64	3	2	0	-	-	66	3
Fram Larvik	2015	2. divisjon	13	1	2	1	-		15	2
Fram Larvik	Total		13	1	2	1	-	-	15	2
Sandefjord	2015	Tippeligaen	8	0	0	0	-		8	0
Sandefjord	2016	1. divisjon	9	0	2	0	-		11	0
Sandefjord	2017	Eliteserien	11	0	0	0	-		11	0
Sandefjord	2018	Eliteserien	24	1	2	0	-		26	1
Sandefjord	2019	1. divisjon	25	1	2	1	-		27	2
Sandefjord	2020	Eliteserien	22	1	0	0	-		22	1
Sandefjord	Total		99	3	6	1	-	-	105	5
Career total			287	13	25	3	-	-	312	16
