= Rufo (footballer) =

Spanish footballer (born 1993)

Personal information
- Full name: Rubén Herráiz Alcaraz
- Date of birth: 13 January 1993 (age 33)
- Place of birth: Barcelona, Spain
- Height: 1.76 m (5 ft 9 1/2 in)
- Position: Forward

Team information
- Current team: FC Santa Coloma
- Number: 11

Youth career
- 2003–2012: Espanyol

Senior career*
Years	Team	Apps	(Gls)
2012–2015	Málaga B	35	(2)
2015–2017	Espanyol B	71	(14)
2015	Espanyol	0	(0)
2017–2018	Mallorca	1	(0)
2018	→ Badalona (loan)	12	(1)
2018–2020	Sandefjord	63	(19)
2021–2022	AaB	22	(3)
2022	Sandefjord	11	(1)
2023	UD Logroñés	6	(1)
2023–	FC Santa Coloma	33	(3)
- * Club domestic league appearances and goals as of 10 June 2025

Rubén Herráiz Alcaraz (born 13 January 1993), commonly known as Rufo, is a Spanish footballer who plays as a forward for Andorran club FC Santa Coloma.

== Club career ==
Born in Barcelona, Catalonia, Rufo finished his graduation with RCD Espanyol. In July 2012 he moved to Málaga CF, being assigned to the reserves in Tercera División.

On 31 July 2015, Rufo returned to the Pericos, signing a two-year contract with the B-side in Segunda División B, with Málaga holding a buy-back clause in the first year. He made his first team debut on 3 December 2015, coming on as a late substitute for Burgui in a 1–1 Copa del Rey away draw against Levante UD.

On 10 July 2017, free agent Rufo joined RCD Mallorca, freshly relegated to the third division.

On 14 August 2018 he signed an 18 month contract with Norwegian side Sandefjord.

== Career statistics ==
=== Club ===
As of match played 24 July 2021

Appearances and goals by club, season and competition
Club	Season	League			National Cup		Europe		Total	
Club	Season	Division	Apps	Goals	Apps	Goals	Apps	Goals	Apps	Goals
Espanyol B	2015–16	Segunda División B	36	8	1	0	-		37	8
Espanyol B	2016–17	Segunda División B	35	6	0	0	-		35	6
Espanyol B	Total		71	14	1	0	-	-	72	14
Mallorca	2017–18	Segunda División B	1	0	1	0	-		2	0
Mallorca	Total		1	0	1	0	-	-	2	0
Badalona (loan)	2017–18	Segunda División B	12	1	0	0	-		12	1
Badalona (loan)	Total		12	1	0	0	-	-	12	1
Sandefjord	2018	Eliteserien	12	7	0	0	-		12	7
Sandefjord	2019	OBOS-ligaen	24	5	2	0	-		26	5
Sandefjord	2020	Eliteserien	27	7	0	0	-		27	7
Sandefjord	Total		63	19	2	0	-	-	65	19
AaB	2020–21	Danish Superliga	16	3	0	0	-		16	3
AaB	2021–22	Danish Superliga	6	0	0	0	-		6	0
AaB	Total		22	3	0	0	-	-	22	3
Sandefjord	2022	Eliteserien	0	0	0	0	-		0	0
Sandefjord	Total		0	0	0	0	-	-	0	0
Career total			169	37	4	0	-	-	173	37
