= IL Flint =

Norwegian sports club

- Full name: Idrettslaget Flint
- Founded: 28 April 1917
- Ground: Flint Esso Arena, Tolvsrød
- Head coach: Shaun Constable
- League: 3. divisjon
- 2024: 3. divisjon group 3, 11th of 14
Home colours	Away colours

Idrettslaget Flint is a Norwegian sports club from Søndre Slagen, Tønsberg, Vestfold. It has sections for association football, team handball, volleyball, table tennis and track and field. Flint is the largest sports club in Vestfold, and the club introduced a new clubhouse in May 2015. The clubhouse is located on Løveid by Tolvsrød, with associated sports facilities and courts. In addition, a number of local grass and gravel courts, school gyms, and Slagenhallen (next to Presterød school) are used.

The club was founded on 28 April 1917.

== Football ==
The club currently plays in 3. divisjon, the fourth tier of the Norwegian football league system.

On 10 October 2001, the football section cooperated with 19 other teams in the region to form an elite umbrella team, FK Tønsberg. Nonetheless, the men's football team was unaffected by the FK Tønsberg founding. On 5 November 2019, Flint announced John Arne Riise as their new head coach.

On 21 November 2021, Flint announced Shaun Constable as their new head coach, replacing John Arne Riise Constable .

== Handball ==
The women's handball team, Flint Tønsberg have been playing in Postenligaen since 2010, having won the First Division, the second tier, in the 2009–10 season, and again from 2020 after being relegated.
