= 2015 Sandefjord Fotball season =

Sandefjord
2015 season
- Chairman: Roger Gulliksen
- Manager: Lars Bohinen
- Stadium: Komplett.no Arena
- Tippeligaen: 16th
- Norwegian Cup: Quarter-final vs Stabæk
- Top goalscorer: League: Pål Alexander Kirkevold (8); All: Pål Alexander Kirkevold (11)
Home colours	Away colours

The 2015 season is Sandefjord Fotball's 18th season, and their first Tippeligaen season since their relegation in 2010. It is their 2nd season with Lars Bohinen as manager, during which they will compete in the Norwegian Cup as well as the Tippeligaen.

== Squad ==
As of 1 September 2015

Note: Flags indicate national team as defined under FIFA eligibility rules; some limited exceptions apply. Players may hold more than one non-FIFA nationality.

No.	Pos.	Nation	Player
1	GK	DEN	Jakob Busk (on loan from Copenhagen)
2	DF	NOR	Lars Grorud
3	DF	NOR	Yaw Ihle Amankwah
4	DF	SEN	Victor Demba Bindia
5	DF	NOR	Alexander Gabrielsen
6	MF	ESP	Pau Morer Vicente
7	MF	NOR	Geir Ludvig Fevang
8	MF	NOR	Erik Mjelde
9	MF	DEN	Mads Pedersen
10	MF	NOR	Eirik Lamøy
11	MF	NOR	Martin Torp
12	GK	NOR	Anders Gundersen (on loan from Strømsgodset)
13	FW	NOR	Vegard Bakker
14	DF	NOR	Kevin Larsen

No.	Pos.	Nation	Player
15	MF	NOR	Martin Andresen
17	DF	DEN	Thomas Juel-Nielsen
18	MF	SEN	Cheikhou Dieng
19	FW	NOR	Kjell Rune Sellin
20	FW	NOR	Jean Alassane Mendy
21	MF	NOR	Kristoffer Normann Hansen
24	FW	COL	Brahain Mosquera
25	MF	SWE	William Kurtovic
27	DF	NOR	Christer Reppesgård Hansen
28	GK	NOR	Vetle Heian
29	DF	NOR	Eirik Offenberg
30	DF	NOR	Varg Støvdal
40	GK	IRL	Gary Hogan

=== Out on loan ===
Note: Flags indicate national team as defined under FIFA eligibility rules; some limited exceptions apply. Players may hold more than one non-FIFA nationality.

No.	Pos.	Nation	Player
22	MF	NOR	Andrè Sødlund (at Nest-Sotra to the end of 2015 season)
24	MF	NOR	Andreas Diserud (at Fram Larvik for the 2015 season)

== Transfers ==
=== Winter ===
In: Note: Flags indicate national team as defined under FIFA eligibility rules; some limited exceptions apply. Players may hold more than one non-FIFA nationality.

No.	Pos.	Nation	Player
1	GK	DEN	Jakob Busk (on loan from (Denmark) Copenhagen)
7	MF	NOR	Geir Ludvig Fevang (from (Norway) Haugesund)
8	MF	NOR	Erik Mjelde (from (Norway) Lillestrøm)
12	GK	NOR	Lars Herlofsen (from (Norway) Tromsø)
20	FW	NOR	Jean Mendy (from (Norway) Kristiansund)
40	GK	DEN	Michael Tørnes (from (Finland) HJK)
—	DF	NOR	Kim Skogsrud (loan return from (Norway) Strømmen)

Out: Note: Flags indicate national team as defined under FIFA eligibility rules; some limited exceptions apply. Players may hold more than one non-FIFA nationality.

No.	Pos.	Nation	Player
1	GK	NOR	Eirik Holmen Johansen (loan return to (England) Manchester City)
2	FW	NOR	Cato Hansen (to (Norway) Egersund)
7	MF	NOR	Ørjan Røyrane (to (Norway) Kongsvinger)
8	MF	NOR	Lars Iver Strand (released)
24	MF	NOR	Andreas Diserud (on loan to (Norway) Fram Larvik)
—	DF	NOR	Kim Skogsrud (to (Norway) Egersund)

=== Summer ===
In: Note: Flags indicate national team as defined under FIFA eligibility rules; some limited exceptions apply. Players may hold more than one non-FIFA nationality.

No.	Pos.	Nation	Player
2	DF	NOR	Lars Grorud (from (Norway) Fram Larvik)
6	MF	ESP	Pau Morer Vicente (from (Spain) Girona)
12	GK	NOR	Anders Gundersen (on loan from (Norway) Strømsgodset)
15	MF	NOR	Martin Andresen (free agent)
40	GK	IRL	Gary Hogan (from (Norway) Ullern)

Out: Note: Flags indicate national team as defined under FIFA eligibility rules; some limited exceptions apply. Players may hold more than one non-FIFA nationality.

No.	Pos.	Nation	Player
6	MF	NOR	Roger Risholt (to (Norway) Fredrikstad)
12	GK	NOR	Lars Herlofsen (released)
16	FW	NOR	Pål Alexander Kirkevold (to (Denmark) Hobro)
22	MF	NOR	André Sødlund (on loan to (Norway) Nest-Sotra)
23	MF	NOR	Mats Haakenstad (to (Norway) Fram Larvik)
40	GK	DEN	Michael Tørnes (released)

== Competitions ==
=== Tippeligaen ===
==== Results summary ====
Overall								Home						Away					
Pld	W	D	L	GF	GA	GD	Pts	W	D	L	GF	GA	GD	W	D	L	GF	GA	GD
30	4	4	22	36	68	−32	16	4	2	9	19	26	−7	0	2	13	17	42	−25

Last updated: 8 November 2015.
Source: see below

==== Results by round ====
Round	1	2	3	4	5	6	7	8	9	10	11	12	13	14	15	16	17	18	19	20	21	22	23	24	25	26	27	28	29	30
Ground	H	A	H	A	H	A	H	A	A	H	A	H	H	A	H	A	H	A	H	A	H	A	H	A	H	A	H	A	H	A
Result	W	L	W	L	L	L	L	L	L	L	L	L	D	D	D	L	L	L	W	D	L	L	L	L	L	L	W	L	L	L
Position	2	7	4	6	7	12	14	14	14	14	16	16	16	16	16	16	16	16	16	16	16	16	16	16	16	16	16	16	16	16

Updated to match(es) played on 8 November 2015. Source: see below
A = Away; H = Home; W = Win; D = Draw; L = Loss

==== Results ====
6 April 2015 1	Sandefjord	3–1	Bodø/Glimt	Sandefjord
18:00 CEST (UTC+2)	Gabrielsen 6'; Bindia (yellow card) 36'; Mendy (yellow card) 54' (goal) 60', 64'	Summary	Furebotn 45+1'; Imingen (yellow card) 74'	Stadium: Komplett Arena; Attendance: 4,446; Referee: Tore Hansen

12 April 2015 2	Start	2–1	Sandefjord	Kristiansand
18:00 CEST (UTC+2)	Kristjánsson (yellow card) 76'; Børufsen (yellow card) 81'; Hoff 83', 90+3'	Summary	Gabrielsen 67'; Herlofsen (yellow card) 87'; Larsen (yellow card) 90+6'	Stadium: Sør Arena; Attendance: 5,234; Referee: Martin Lundby

19 April 2015 3	Sandefjord	1–0	Sarpsborg 08	Sandefjord
18:00 CEST (UTC+2)	Larsen (yellow card) 35'; Lamøy (yellow card) 35'; Hansen 64'; Mjelde (yellow card) 69'; Torp (yellow card) 80'	Summary	Ojamaa (red card) 54'; Berge (yellow card) 87'; Ernemann (yellow card) 90+2'	Stadium: Komplett Arena; Attendance: 4,450; Referee: Tommy Skjerven

26 April 2015 4	Strømsgodset	3–2	Sandefjord	Drammen
18:00 CEST (UTC+2)	Lehne Olsen 20'; Storflor 28', 38' (yellow card) 77'	Summary	Kirkevold 33'; Hansen 90'	Stadium: Marienlyst Stadion; Attendance: 6,412; Referee: Espen Berntsen

30 April 2015 5	Sandefjord	1–2	Viking	Sandefjord
18:00 CEST (UTC+2)	Dieng 79'; Bindia (yellow card) 90'	Summary	Abdullahi 46'; Adegbenro (yellow card) 66'; Berisha 82' (pen.)	Stadium: Komplett Arena; Attendance: 3,442; Referee: Trygve Kjensli

2 May 2015 6	Haugesund	2–1	Sandefjord	Haugesund
18:00 CEST (UTC+2)	Diedhiou 34'; Gytkjær 67'	Summary	Mjelde 8'; Risholt (yellow card) 26' (yellow-red card) 87'	Stadium: Haugesund Stadion; Attendance: 5,002; Referee: Ola Hobber Nilsen

10 May 2015 7	Sandefjord	1–3	Aalesund	Sandefjord
15:30 CEST (UTC+2)	Fevang 53'; Pedersen (yellow card) 81'	Summary	Mäntylä (yellow card) 39'; Abdellaoue 71'; O.Lie (yellow card) 76'; Barrantes 89'; Mattila 90+2' (pen.)	Stadium: Komplett Arena; Attendance: 4,613; Referee: Espen Berntsen

13 May 2015 8	Stabæk	4–0	Sandefjord	Bærum
18:00 CEST (UTC+2)	Diomande 39', 56', 70'; Asante 48'	Summary		Stadium: Nadderud Stadion; Attendance: 3,329; Referee: Anders Johansen

16 May 2015 9	Rosenborg	5–1	Sandefjord	Trondheim
18:00 CEST (UTC+2)	Søderlund 3'; Selnæs (yellow card) 20'; Mikkelsen 35', 60'; Midtsjø 67'; Dorsin 90+1'	Summary	Mjelde 14'; Dieng (yellow card) 90+2'	Stadium: Lerkendal Stadion; Attendance: 21,266; Referee: Tom Harald Hagen

25 May 2015 10	Sandefjord	0–3	Vålerenga	Sandefjord
20:00 CEST (UTC+2)	Sellin (yellow card) 22'; Gabrielsen (red card) 90+2'	Summary	Braaten 14'; Wæhler 33' (yellow card) 57'; Holm 88' (pen.)	Stadium: Komplett Arena; Attendance: 4,338; Referee: Tore Hansen

30 May 2015 11	Molde	6–1	Sandefjord	Molde
18:00 CEST (UTC+2)	Linnes 13'; Elyounoussi 40', 42', 49'; Høiland 77', 90'	Summary	Larsen (yellow card) 27'; Mjelde 38'; Bindia (yellow card) 57'; Risholt (yellow card) 64'	Stadium: Aker Stadion; Attendance: 8,393; Referee: Svein Erik Edvartsen

6 June 2015 12	Sandefjord	0–1	Odd	Sandefjord
18:00 CEST (UTC+2)	Torp (yellow card) 23'; Amankwah (yellow card) 69'	Summary	Occéan 53'	Stadium: Komplett Arena; Attendance: 3,903; Referee: Dag Vidar Hafsås

20 June 2015 13	Sandefjord	0–0	Lillestrøm	Sandefjord
15:30 CEST (UTC+2)		Summary	Kippe (yellow card) 26'; Riise (yellow card) 73'	Stadium: Komplett Arena; Attendance: 3,635; Referee: Svein Oddvar Moen

28 June 2015 14	Mjøndalen	2–2	Sandefjord	Mjøndalen
18:00 CEST (UTC+2)	J.S.Olsen (yellow card) 80'; Nilsen 84'; Arneberg 90'	Summary	Hansen (yellow card) 9'; Kirkevold 28', 42'; Fevang (yellow card) 33'; Dieng (yellow card) 43'; Tørnes (yellow card) 85'	Stadium: Isachsen Stadion; Attendance: 2,207; Referee: Kai Erik Steen

5 July 2015 15	Sandefjord	1–1	Tromsø	Sandefjord
18:00 CEST (UTC+2)	Risholt (yellow card) 40'; Juel-Nielsen (yellow card) 63'; Mjelde 79'	Summary	Ondrášek (yellow card) 68'; Landu Landu (yellow card) 89'; J.Johansen 90+1'	Stadium: Komplett Arena; Attendance: 3,555; Referee: Tore Hansen

12 July 2015 16	Vålerenga	2–0	Sandefjord	Oslo
18:00 CEST (UTC+2)	Ómarsson 12', (yellow card) 90+3'; Fredrikson (yellow card) 25'; Wæhler (yellow card) 39', (goal) 43'	Summary	Mjelde (yellow card) 51'	Stadium: Ullevaal stadion Attendance: 7,615; Referee: Svein-Erik Edvartsen

26 July 2015 17	Sandefjord	1–2	Rosenborg	Sandefjord
20:00 CEST (UTC+2)	Kirkevold 62' (yellow card) 86'; Juel-Nielsen (yellow card) 78'; Larsen (yellow card) 84'; Bindia (yellow card) 88'	Summary	Mikkelsen 5'; Søderlund 10'; Midtsjø (yellow card) 88'	Stadium: Komplett Arena; Attendance: 5,731; Referee: Anders Johansen

2 August 2015 18	Lillestrøm	3–2	Sandefjord	Kjeller
18:00 CEST (UTC+2)	Kippe 3' (yellow card) 86'; Knudtzon 29'; Friday 33'; Pellegrino (yellow card) 90'	Summary	Hansen (yellow card) 18'; Amundsen 41' (o.g.); Kirkevold 67'	Stadium: Åråsen Stadion; Attendance: 3,881; Referee: Ola Nilsen

7 August 2015 19	Sandefjord	2–1	Mjøndalen	Sandefjord
19:00 CEST (UTC+2)	Sellin 30', 53'	Summary	Arneberg (yellow card) 20'; Midtgarden 26'; Aasmundsen (yellow card) 87'; M.S.Olsen (yellow card) 90+1'	Stadium: Komplett Arena; Attendance: 6,174; Referee: Ole Gya

16 August 2015 20	Tromsø	1–1	Sandefjord	Tromsø
18:00 CEST (UTC+2)	Åsen (yellow card) 54'; Antonsen 85'	Summary	Fevang (yellow card) 26'; Kirkevold 30' (yellow card) 80'	Stadium: Alfheim Stadion; Attendance: 3,244; Referee: Ola Hobber Nilsen

22 August 2015 21	Sandefjord	2–4	Stabæk	Sandefjord
18:00 CEST (UTC+2)	Kirkevold 27', 73' (yellow card) 90+3'; Dieng (yellow card) 33'; Mjelde (yellow card) 62'; Hansen (yellow card) 84'	Summary	Diomande 4', 75' (pen.); Grossman 11'; Kassi 86'	Stadium: Komplett Arena; Attendance: 3,269; Referee: Espen Berntsen

29 August 2015 22	Viking	2–0	Sandefjord	Stavanger
18:00 CEST (UTC+2)	Bytyqi 31'; Böðvarsson 50'	Summary	Pedersen (yellow card) 62'	Stadium: Viking Stadion; Attendance: 8,884; Referee: Tom Harald Hagen

12 September 2015 23	Sandefjord	2–4	Molde	Sandefjord
18:00 CEST (UTC+2)	Mjelde 26'; Larsen (yellow card) 42'; Bindia 90'	Summary	Kamara 25', 43'; Svendsen (red card) 45+1'; Hussain 67'; Elyounoussi 79'	Stadium: Komplett Arena; Attendance: 3,317; Referee: Trond Ivar Døvle

20 September 2015 24	Bodø/Glimt	2–1	Sandefjord	Bodø
18:00 CEST (UTC+2)	Moe 3'; Furebotn 71'	Summary	Fevang 17'; Juel-Nielsen (yellow card) 33'; Lamøy (yellow card) 80'	Stadium: Aspmyra stadion Attendance: 2,961; Referee: Tore Hansen

26 September 2015 25	Sandefjord	0–1	Haugesund	Sandefjord
18:00 CEST (UTC+2)	Sellin (yellow card) 45'; Pedersen (yellow card) 75'	Summary	Diedhiou 84'	Stadium: Komplett Arena; Attendance: 3,421; Referee: Tore Hansen

4 October 2015 26	Aalesund	2–1	Sandefjord	Ålesund
18:00 CEST (UTC+2)	Abdellaoue 89'; Þrándarson 90+2'	Summary	Mendy 22'; Mjelde (yellow card) 60'; Morer (yellow card) 71'	Stadium: Color Line Stadion; Attendance: 7,463; Referee: Dag Vidar Hafsås

17 October 2015 27	Sandefjord	4–1	Start	Sandefjord
15:30 CEST (UTC+2)	Sellin 2'; Dieng 27', 88'; Morer (yellow card) 60'; Juel-Nielsen (yellow card) 86'; Mendy 90+4'	Summary	Bindia 63' (o.g.); Vikstøl (yellow card) 65'; Christensen (yellow card) 87'	Stadium: Komplett Arena; Attendance: 3,435; Referee: Svein Erik Edvartsen

25 October 2015 28	Odd	4–3	Sandefjord	Skien
18:00 CET (UTC+1)	Samuelsen 19', 90+2'; Diouf 56'; Occéan 87'	Summary	Morer 17', 62' (yellow card) 71'; Mjelde (yellow card) 25'; Mendy 86'; Kurtovic (yellow card) 89'	Stadium: Skagerak Arena; Attendance: 7,752; Referee: Dag Vidar Hafsås

1 November 2015 29	Sandefjord	1–2	Strømsgodset	Sandefjord
18:00 CET (UTC+1)	Offenberg (yellow card) 64'; Mendy 85' (pen.)	Summary	Tagbajumi 6'; Nana 21'; Lehne Olsen (yellow card) 90'	Stadium: Komplett Arena; Attendance: 4,153; Referee: Trond Ivar Døvle

8 November 2015 30	Sarpsborg 08	2–1	Sandefjord	Sarpsborg
18:00 CET (UTC+1)	Kachi 57'; Ernemann 90+3' (pen.)	Summary	Morer (yellow card) 45'; Sellin 63'; Busk (yellow card) 90+3'	Stadium: Sarpsborg Stadion; Attendance: 3,540; Referee: Espen Berntsen

==== Table ====
Pos	Team	Pld	W	D	L	GF	GA	GD	Pts	Qualification or relegation
12	Haugesund	30	8	7	15	33	52	−19	31	
13	Tromsø	30	7	8	15	36	50	−14	29	
14	Start (O)	30	5	7	18	35	64	−29	22	Qualification for the relegation play-offs
15	Mjøndalen (R)	30	4	9	17	38	69	−31	21	Relegation to First Division
16	Sandefjord (R)	30	4	4	22	36	68	−32	16	Relegation to First Division

Source: Football Association of Norway (in Norwegian), Soccerway
Rules for classification: 1) Points; 2) Goal difference; 3) Goals scored; 4) Head-to-head points; 5) Head-to-head goal difference; 6) Head-to-head away goals scored (between two teams).
(O) Play-off winners; (R) Relegated

=== Norwegian Cup ===
22 April 2015 First round	Asker	1–2	Sandefjord	Asker
18:00 CEST (UTC+2)	Sistek 48'	Summary	M.Haakenstad 5'; Kirkevold 26'; Larsen (yellow card) 45'	Stadium: Føyka Stadion; Attendance: 671; Referee: Anders Gjermshus

6 May 2015 Second round	Fram Larvik	0–1	Sandefjord	Larvik
18:00 CEST (UTC+2)	Stenild (yellow card) 13'; Grorud (yellow card) 50'; Pietroń (yellow card) 75'; Saga (yellow card) 84'; Drugge (yellow card) 84'	Summary	Torp (yellow card) 57'; Mjelde (yellow card) 65'; M.Haakenstad 73'; Pedersen (yellow card) 76'; Mendy (yellow card) 90+2'	Stadium: Fram Stadion; Attendance: 1,512; Referee: Mohammad Usman Aslam

3 June 2015 Third round	Kongsvinger	3–3 (a.e.t.) (5–6 p)	Sandefjord	Kongsvinger
18:00 CEST (UTC+2)	Røyrane 35' (yellow card) 66'; Maikel 45' (pen.); M.Moldskred 52'; J.Richardsen (yellow card) 111'	Summary	Sellin 7'; Kirkevold 42'; Larsen (yellow card) 43' (goal) 65'; Amankwah (yellow card) 120'; Tørnes (yellow card) 120'	Stadium: Gjemselund Stadion; Attendance: 1,512; Referee: Sigurd Smehus Kringstad
	Penalties
	M.Solum (penalty scored); Maikel (penalty scored); M.Moldskred (penalty scored); M.Ellingsen (penalty missed); T.Bjerk-Edvardsen (penalty scored); O.Moltzau (penalty scored); E.Dadjo (penalty missed)		(penalty missed) Gabrielsen; (penalty scored) Mjelde; (penalty scored) Kirkevold; (penalty scored) Mendy; (penalty scored) Torp; (penalty scored) Larsen; (penalty scored) Sellin

24 June 2015 Fourth round	Hønefoss	2–3	Sandefjord	Hønefoss
19:00 CEST (UTC+2)	Beugré 17', 66'; Seck (yellow card) 50'	Summary	Kirkevold 28'; Mendy 62'; K.Hansen 75'; Fevang (yellow card) 79'	Stadium: Aka Arena; Attendance: 808; Referee: Omar Rafiq

13 August 2015 Quarter-final	Sandefjord	0–1	Stabæk	Sandefjord
19:00 CEST (UTC+2)	Bindia (yellow card) 67'; Kurtovic (yellow card) 87'	Summary	Diomande 64'	Stadium: Komplett Arena; Attendance: 1,824; Referee: Tommy Skjerven

== Squad statistics ==
As of match played 8 November 2015

=== Appearances and goals ===
No.	Pos	Nat	Player	Total		Tippeligaen		Norwegian Cup	
No.	Pos	Nat	Player	Apps	Goals	Apps	Goals	Apps	Goals
1	GK	(Denmark) DEN	Jakob Busk	15	0	14	0	1	0
2	DF	(Norway) NOR	Lars Grorud	8	0	8	0	0	0
3	DF	(Norway) NOR	Yaw Ihle Amankwah	8	0	5	0	3	0
4	DF	(Senegal) SEN	Victor Demba Bindia	34	1	29	1	5	0
5	DF	(Norway) NOR	Alexander Gabrielsen	13	2	11	2	1+1	0
6	MF	(Spain) ESP	Pau Morer Vicente	6	2	4+2	2	0	0
7	MF	(Norway) NOR	Geir Ludvig Fevang	28	2	25+1	2	0+2	0
8	MF	(Norway) NOR	Erik Mjelde	31	5	24+2	5	4+1	0
9	MF	(Denmark) DEN	Mads Pedersen	21	0	7+10	0	3+1	0
10	MF	(Norway) NOR	Eirik Lamøy	17	0	16	0	1	0
11	MF	(Norway) NOR	Martin Torp	12	0	3+6	0	2+1	0
12	GK	(Norway) NOR	Anders Gundersen	7	0	6	0	1	0
13	FW	(Norway) NOR	Vegard Bakker	1	0	0+1	0	0	0
14	DF	(Norway) NOR	Kevin Larsen	21	1	14+3	0	4	1
15	MF	(Norway) NOR	Martin Andresen	3	0	3	0	0	0
17	DF	(Denmark) DEN	Thomas Juel-Nielsen	24	0	11+9	0	4	0
18	MF	(Senegal) SEN	Cheikhou Dieng	32	3	25+2	3	4+1	0
19	FW	(Norway) NOR	Kjell Rune Sellin	25	4	18+5	3	1+1	1
20	FW	(Norway) NOR	Jean Alassane Mendy	25	7	13+8	6	1+3	1
21	MF	(Norway) NOR	Kristoffer Normann Hansen	29	2	17+8	1	4	1
24	FW	(Colombia) COL	Brahain Mosquera	1	0	0	0	0+1	0
25	MF	(Sweden) SWE	William Kurtovic	14	0	8+5	0	1	0
27	DF	(Norway) NOR	Christer Reppesgård Hansen	21	0	18	0	3	0
29	DF	(Norway) NOR	Eirik Offenberg	7	0	6+1	0	0	0
30	DF	(Norway) NOR	Varg Ringdal Støvland	3	0	0+3	0	0	0
40	GK	(Republic of Ireland) IRL	Gary Hogan	1	0	1	0	0	0
Players away from Sandefjord on loan:
22	MF	(Norway) NOR	André Sødlund	5	0	0+4	0	1	0
Players who appeared for Sandefjord no longer at the club:
6	MF	(Norway) NOR	Roger Risholt	15	0	11+2	0	1+1	0
12	GK	(Norway) NOR	Lars Herlofsen	6	0	6	0	0	0
16	FW	(Norway) NOR	Pål Alexander Kirkevold	26	11	21	8	5	3
23	MF	(Norway) NOR	Mats Haakenstad	7	2	3+2	0	2	2
40	GK	(Denmark) DEN	Michael Tørnes	12	0	8+1	0	3	0

=== Goal scorers ===
Place	Position	Nation	Number	Name	Tippeligaen	Norwegian Cup	Total
1	FW	(Norway)	16	Pål Alexander Kirkevold	8	3	11
2	FW	(Norway)	20	Jean Alassane Mendy	6	1	7
3	MF	(Norway)	8	Erik Mjelde	5	0	5
3	FW	(Norway)	19	Kjell Rune Sellin	4	1	5
5	MF	(Senegal)	18	Cheikhou Dieng	3	0	3
6	DF	(Norway)	5	Alexander Gabrielsen	2	0	2
6	MF	(Norway)	7	Geir Ludvig Fevang	2	0	2
6	MF	(Spain)	6	Pau Morer Vicente	2	0	2
6	MF	(Norway)	21	Kristoffer Normann Hansen	1	1	2
6	MF	(Norway)	23	Mats Haakenstad	0	2	2
11	DF	(Senegal)	4	Victor Demba Bindia	1	0	1
11				Own goal	1	0	1
11	DF	(Norway)	14	Kevin Larsen	0	1	1
				TOTALS	36	9	45

=== Disciplinary record ===
Number	Nation	Position	Name	Tippeligaen		Norwegian Cup		Total	
Number	Nation	Position	Name	Yellow card	Red card	Yellow card	Red card	Yellow card	Red card
1	(Denmark)	GK	Jakob Busk	1	0	0	0	1	0
3	(Norway)	DF	Yaw Ihle Amankwah	1	0	1	0	2	0
4	(Senegal)	DF	Victor Demba Bindia	4	0	1	0	5	0
5	(Norway)	DF	Alexander Gabrielsen	0	1	0	0	0	1
6	(Norway)	MF	Roger Risholt	4	1	0	0	4	1
6	(Spain)	MF	Pau Morer Vicente	4	0	0	0	4	0
7	(Norway)	MF	Geir Ludvig Fevang	2	0	1	0	3	0
8	(Norway)	MF	Erik Mjelde	6	0	1	0	7	0
9	(Denmark)	FW	Mads Pedersen	3	0	1	0	4	0
10	(Norway)	MF	Eirik Lamøy	2	0	0	0	2	0
11	(Norway)	MF	Martin Torp	2	0	1	0	3	0
12	(Norway)	GK	Lars Herlofsen	1	0	0	0	1	0
14	(Norway)	DF	Kevin Larsen	5	0	2	0	7	0
16	(Norway)	FW	Pål Alexander Kirkevold	3	0	0	0	3	0
17	(Denmark)	DF	Thomas Juel-Nielsen	4	0	0	0	4	0
18	(Senegal)	MF	Cheikhou Dieng	3	0	0	0	3	0
19	(Norway)	FW	Kjell Rune Sellin	2	0	0	0	2	0
20	(Norway)	FW	Jean Alassane Mendy	1	0	1	0	2	0
21	(Norway)	MF	Kristoffer Normann Hansen	2	0	0	0	2	0
25	(Sweden)	MF	William Kurtovic	1	0	1	0	2	0
27	(Norway)	DF	Christer Reppesgård Hansen	1	0	0	0	1	0
29	(Norway)	DF	Eirik Offenberg	1	0	0	0	1	0
40	(Denmark)	GK	Michael Tørnes	1	0	1	0	2	0
			TOTALS	54	2	11	0	65	2
