= 2015 Molde FK season =

Molde
2015 season
- Chairman: Øystein Neerland
- Manager: Tor Ole Skullerud (until 6 August); Erling Moe (interim) (7 August–21 October); Ole Gunnar Solskjær (from 21 October)
- Stadium: Aker Stadion
- Tippeligaen: 6th
- Norwegian Cup: Quarter-final vs. Viking
- Champions League: Third qualifying round vs. Dinamo Zagreb
- Europa League: Round of 32
- Top goalscorer: League: Ola Kamara (14); All: Ola Kamara (21)
- Highest home attendance: 11,113 vs. Rosenborg (20 September 2015)
- Lowest home attendance: 2,424 vs. Kvik Halden (24 June 2015)
- Average home league attendance: 8,952
| Home colours | Away colours | Third colours |

The 2015 season was Molde's eight consecutive year in Tippeligaen, and their 39th season in the top flight of Norwegian football. It was their second season with Tor Ole Skullerud as their manager, and they were the defending champions of both the Tippeligaen and Norwegian Cup. Along with Tippeligaen, the club also competed in the Norwegian Cup, the UEFA Champions League and the UEFA Europa League.

== Season events ==
Following the clubs elimination from the UEFA Champions League, manager Tor Ole Skullerud was sacked on 6 August, being replaced with Erling Moe on an interim basis. On 21 October 2015, Ole Gunnar Solskjær returned as manager, signing a 3.5 year contract.

== Squad ==
As of 29 July 2015

Note: Flags indicate national team as defined under FIFA eligibility rules; some limited exceptions apply. Players may hold more than one non-FIFA nationality.

| No. | Pos. | Nation | Player |
|---|---|---|---|
| 1 | GK | USA | Ethan Horvath |
| 2 | DF | NOR | Fredrik Semb Berge (loan from Brøndby) |
| 3 | MF | SEN | Amidou Diop |
| 4 | DF | NOR | Ruben Gabrielsen |
| 5 | DF | FIN | Joona Toivio |
| 6 | MF | NOR | Daniel Berg Hestad (Captain) |
| 7 | MF | NOR | Harmeet Singh |
| 8 | FW | NOR | Fredrik Gulbrandsen |
| 9 | MF | SWE | Mattias Moström |
| 11 | FW | NOR | Ola Kamara (loan from Austria Wien) |
| 14 | DF | NOR | Martin Linnes |
| 15 | DF | NOR | Per Egil Flo |

| No. | Pos. | Nation | Player |
|---|---|---|---|
| 16 | MF | NOR | Etzaz Hussain |
| 18 | DF | NOR | Magne Simonsen |
| 19 | MF | NOR | Eirik Hestad |
| 20 | FW | NOR | Tommy Høiland |
| 21 | MF | BRA | Agnaldo |
| 22 | MF | USA | Joshua Gatt |
| 23 | DF | NOR | Knut Olav Rindarøy |
| 24 | FW | NOR | Mohamed Elyounoussi |
| 25 | DF | NOR | Vegard Forren |
| 26 | GK | SWE | Andreas Linde |
| 27 | FW | NOR | Mushaga Bakenga (loan from Club Brugge) |
| 32 | FW | NOR | Sander Svendsen |

=== Players on loan ===
Note: Flags indicate national team as defined under FIFA eligibility rules; some limited exceptions apply. Players may hold more than one non-FIFA nationality.

| No. | Pos. | Nation | Player |
|---|---|---|---|
| 10 | MF | NOR | Thomas Kind Bendiksen (at Tromsø) |
| 30 | FW | SEN | Pape Paté Diouf (at Odd) |
| 33 | MF | NOR | Andreas Hollingen (at Start) |

| No. | Pos. | Nation | Player |
|---|---|---|---|
| 31 | FW | USA | Ben Spencer (at Toronto FC II) |
| 37 | DF | NOR | Ole Martin Rindarøy (at Start) |
| 38 | MF | NOR | Stian Rode Gregersen (at Kristiansund) |

=== Reserve squad ===
Note: Flags indicate national team as defined under FIFA eligibility rules; some limited exceptions apply. Players may hold more than one non-FIFA nationality.

| No. | Pos. | Nation | Player |
|---|---|---|---|
| 34 | GK | BRA | Neydson da Silva |
| 39 | MF | NOR | Eskil Rønningen |
| 40 | GK | NOR | Isak Gangeskar |
| 41 | DF | NOR | Henrik Pettersen |
| 43 | FW | NOR | Mats Aambø |
| 44 | FW | NOR | Jan Tidjani Aboubacar |
| 45 | MF | NOR | Sebastian Remme Berge |
| 46 | FW | NOR | Agwa Okuot Obiech |
| 47 | MF | NOR | Kjetil Tøsse |
| 48 | FW | NOR | Erlend Hustad |
| 49 | MF | NOR | Ola Husby |

| No. | Pos. | Nation | Player |
|---|---|---|---|
| 50 | GK | NOR | Jonathan Byttingsvik |
| 51 | DF | NOR | Kristian Strande |
| 52 | MF | NOR | Tobias Svendsen |
| 53 | DF | NOR | Martin Ove Roseth |
| 54 | FW | NOR | Elias Mordal |
| 55 | FW | NOR | Jesper Nyheim |
| 56 | MF | NOR | Tobias Nyheim |
| 57 | MF | NOR | Eman Markovic |
| 58 | FW | NOR | Thomas Røsok |
| 59 | FW | NOR | Adnan Dudic |
| 60 | MF | NOR | Elias Arntsen |

== Transfers ==
=== In ===
| Date | Position | Nationality | Name | From | Fee |
|---|---|---|---|---|---|
| 23 December 2014 | MF | (Norway) | Thomas Kind Bendiksen | (Norway) Tromsø | |
| 9 January 2015 | MF | (Norway) | Eman Markovic | (Norway) Lyngdal | |
| 27 January 2015 | GK | (Sweden) | Andreas Linde | (Sweden) Helsingborg | |

=== Out ===
| Date | Position | Nationality | Name | To | Fee |
|---|---|---|---|---|---|
| | FW | (Iceland) | Björn Bergmann Sigurðarson | loan return to (England) Wolverhampton Wanderers | |
| 12 December 2014 | GK | (Norway) | Espen Bugge Pettersen | (Norway) Strømsgodset | |
| 17 December 2014 | DF | (Norway) | Magnar Ødegaard | (Norway) Tromsø | |
| 20 January 2015 | FW | (England) | John Cofie | (England) Crawley Town | |
| 20 January 2015 | DF | (Senegal) | Seydina Keita | loan return to (Senegal) Diambars FC | |
| 21 January 2015 | FW | (Senegal) | Aliou Coly | (Norway) Kristiansund | |
| 13 February 2015 | FW | (Nigeria) | Daniel Chima Chukwu | (China) Shanghai Shenxin | |
| 1 July 2015 | GK | (Norway) | Ørjan Nyland | (Germany) Ingolstadt 04 | Undisclosed |
| 28 August 2015 | MF | (Norway) | Eirik Haugan | (France) Marseille | Undisclosed |

=== Loans in ===
| Date from | Date to | Position | Nationality | Name | From |
|---|---|---|---|---|---|
| 28 January 2015 | Season-long | FW | (Norway) | Ola Kamara | Austria Wien |
| 11 February 2015 | Season-long | DF | (Norway) | Fredrik Semb Berge | (Denmark) Brøndby |
| 18 March 2015 | Season-long | FW | (Norway) | Mushaga Bakenga | (Belgium) Club Brugge |

=== Loans out ===
| Date from | Date to | Position | Nationality | Name | To |
|---|---|---|---|---|---|
| 26 March 2015 | Season long | DF | (Norway) | Ole Martin Rindarøy | (Norway) Start |
| 26 March 2015 | Season long | MF | (Norway) | Andreas Hollingen | (Norway) Start |
| 26 March 2015 | Season long | MF | (Norway) | Stian Rode Gregersen | (Norway) Kristiansund |
| 31 March 2015 | 22 July 2015 | MF | (Senegal) | Amidou Diop | (Norway) Mjøndalen |
| 23 April 2015 | Season long | MF | (United States) | Ben Spencer | (Canada) Toronto FC II |
| 28 July 2015 | Remaining season | FW | (Senegal) | Pape Paté Diouf | (Norway) Odd |
| 29 July 2015 | Remaining season | FW | (Norway) | Thomas Kind Bendiksen | (Norway) Tromsø |

== Friendlies ==
| 3 February 2015 | Molde (Norway) | 2–2 | (Sweden) Hammarby | La Manga, Spain |
| 18:00 CET (UTC+1) | Singh 30' (pen.); Svendsen 75' | Summary | Hallenius 45'; Söderqvist 49' | Stadium: Pinatar Arena |

| 14 February 2015 | Midtjylland (Denmark) | 0–2 | (Norway) Molde | Herning, Denmark |
| 15:00 CET (UTC+1) | | Summary | Kamara 10'; Bendiksen 59' | Stadium: MCH Arena |

| 28 February 2015 | Molde | 2–1 | Kristiansund | Molde |
| 15:00 CET (UTC+1) | Høiland 50'; Diouf 90' | Summary | Coly 73' | Stadium: Aker Stadion |

| 1 March 2015 | Molde | 2–1 | Sandefjord | Molde |
| 17:00 CET (UTC+1) | Svendsen 51', 66' | Summary | Pedersen 53' | Stadium: Aker Stadion |

| 6 March 2015 | Molde | 5–2 | Sogndal | Molde |
| 17:00 CET (UTC+1) | Svendsen 17', 36'; Høiland 59', 76', 81' (pen.) | Summary | Shroot 28'; Opseth 90' (pen.) | Stadium: Aker Stadion |

| 11 March 2015 | Molde (Norway) | 1–0 | (Finland) HJK | Marbella, Spain |
| 15:00 CET (UTC+1) | Kamara 58' (pen.) | Summary |

| 14 March 2015 | Molde (Norway) | 2–3 | (Iceland) FH | Marbella, Spain |
| 16:00 CET (UTC+1) | Svendsen 14'; Diouf 19' | Summary | Goal |

| 20 March 2015 | Molde (Norway) | 1–1 | (Sweden) Kalmar | Marbella, Spain |
| 16:00 CET (UTC+1) | Elyounoussi 60' | Summary | 90' |

| 24 March 2015 | Molde | 3–0 | Hødd | Molde |
| 18:00 CET (UTC+1) | Kamara 6'; Diouf 43'; Agnaldo 62' | Summary | | Stadium: Aker Stadion |

| 30 March 2015 | Aalesunds | 2–2 | Molde | Ålesund |
| 18:00 CET (UTC+1) | Mäntylä (yellow card) 49'; James 63', 75' | Summary | Kamara 21'; E.Haugan (yellow card) 55'; Agnaldo 57' | Stadium: Color Line Stadion |

| 18 November 2015 | Molde | 3–0 | Sogndal | Molde |
| 14:00 CET (UTC+1) | Høiland 48', 53'; Agnaldo 77' | Summary | | Stadium: Aker Stadion |

| 3 December 2015 | Malmö (Sweden) | 3–1 | (Norway) Molde | Molde |
| 13:00 CET (UTC+1) | Adu 44' (pen.); Kroon 79'; Rakip 84' | Summary | Gulbrandsen 29' | Stadium: Aker Stadion; Attendance: 240; Referee: Martin Strömbergsson |

== Competitions ==
=== Tippeligaen ===
==== Results summary ====
| Overall | | | | | | | | Home | | | | | | Away | | | | | |
| Pld | W | D | L | GF | GA | GD | Pts | W | D | L | GF | GA | GD | W | D | L | GF | GA | GD |
|---|---|---|---|---|---|---|---|---|---|---|---|---|---|---|---|---|---|---|---|
| 30 | 15 | 7 | 8 | 62 | 31 | +31 | 52 | 8 | 4 | 3 | 37 | 15 | +22 | 7 | 3 | 5 | 25 | 16 | +9 |

Last updated: 9 November 2015.
Source: see below

==== Results by round ====
| Round | 1 | 2 | 3 | 4 | 5 | 6 | 7 | 8 | 9 | 10 | 11 | 12 | 13 | 14 | 15 | 16 | 17 | 18 | 19 | 20 | 21 | 22 | 23 | 24 | 25 | 26 | 27 | 28 | 29 | 30 |
|---|---|---|---|---|---|---|---|---|---|---|---|---|---|---|---|---|---|---|---|---|---|---|---|---|---|---|---|---|---|---|
| Ground | H | A | H | A | H | A | H | A | H | A | H | A | H | A | A | H | H | A | H | A | H | A | H | A | A | H | H | A | H | A |
| Result | L | W | W | D | W | L | W | L | D | W | W | L | D | D | W | L | L | D | D | W | D | W | W | L | L | W | W | W | W | W |
| Position | 11 | 8 | 5 | 4 | 2 | 4 | 3 | 5 | 6 | 5 | 4 | 4 | 5 | 5 | 4 | 6 | 7 | 7 | 7 | 7 | 8 | 7 | 6 | 7 | 7 | 7 | 7 | 7 | 6 | 6 |

Updated to match(es) played on 9 November 2015. Source: see below
A = Away; H = Home; W = Win; D = Draw; L = Loss

==== Results ====
| 7 April 2015 1 | Molde | 1–2 | Odd | Molde |
| 19:00 CEST (UTC+2) | Elyounoussi 89'; Forren (yellow card) 90+2' | Summary | Johnsen 54'; Ruud (yellow card) 63'; Halvorsen 90' | Stadium: Aker Stadion; Attendance: 8,308; Referee: Tom Harald Hagen |

| 11 April 2015 2 | Bodø/Glimt | 1–3 | Molde | Bodø |
| 15:30 CEST (UTC+2) | Forren 78' (o.g.) | Summary | Kamara 17', 60'; Elyounoussi 88' | Stadium: Aspmyra Stadion; Attendance: 2,962; Referee: Dag Vidar Hafsås |

| 19 April 2015 3 | Molde | 5–1 | Aalesund | Molde |
| 18:00 CEST (UTC+2) | Svendsen 5', 62'; Kamara 10', 75'; Høiland 81' | Summary | Barrantes 43'; Mattila (yellow card) 48' | Stadium: Aker Stadion; Attendance: 9,573; Referee: Dag Vidar Hafsås |

| 26 April 2015 4 | Haugesund | 0–0 | Molde | Haugesund |
| 18:00 CEST (UTC+2) | Bamberg (yellow card) 57'; Bjørnbak (yellow card) 73'; Haukås (yellow card) 85' | Summary | Diouf (yellow card) 84' | Stadium: Haugesund Stadion; Attendance: 5,446; Referee: Trond Ivar Døvle |

| 29 April 2015 5 | Molde | 3–1 | Strømsgodset | Molde |
| 19:00 CEST (UTC+2) | Kamara 32'; Elyounoussi 45', 82' | Summary | Kovács 13'; Wikheim (yellow card) 42'; Abu (yellow card) 50' | Stadium: Aker Stadion; Attendance: 8,512; Referee: Svein Oddvar Moen |

| 4 May 2015 6 | Viking | 2–1 | Molde | Stavanger |
| 19:00 CEST (UTC+2) | Adegbenro 44'; Berisha 72'; Thioune (yellow card) 78' | Summary | Moström (yellow card) 4'; Høiland 22'; Toivio (yellow card) 69'; Singh (yellow card) 87' | Stadium: Viking Stadion; Attendance: 7,086; Referee: Espen Berntsen |

| 10 May 2015 7 | Molde | 4–0 | Start | Molde |
| 20:00 CEST (UTC+2) | Høiland 22', 31', 87'; Agnaldo 73' | Summary | DeJohn (yellow card) 27'; Hollingen (yellow card) 72' | Stadium: Aker Stadion; Attendance: 8,269; Referee: Ken Henry Johnsen |

| 13 May 2015 8 | Lillestrøm | 2–1 | Molde | Lillestrøm |
| 18:00 CEST (UTC+2) | Knudtzon 60', 63' | Summary | Toivio 7' (yellow card) 78' | Stadium: Åråsen Stadion; Attendance: 7,259; Referee: Svein Oddvar Moen |

| 16 May 2015 9 | Molde | 3–3 | Stabæk | Molde |
| 18:00 CEST (UTC+2) | Svendsen 34', 37'; Hussain (yellow card) 66'; Kamara 87' | Summary | Skjønsberg (yellow card) 38'; Diomande 39', 68'; Issah 61'; Meling (yellow card) 90' | Stadium: Aker Stadion; Attendance: 10,633; Referee: Dag Vidar Hafsås |

| 22 May 2015 10 | Mjøndalen | 0–3 | Molde | Mjøndalen |
| 19:00 CEST (UTC+2) | Solberg Olsen (yellow card) 19'; Sylling Olsen (yellow card) 51'; Gauseth (yellow card) 54' | Summary | Elyounoussi 28'; Forren (yellow card) 50'; Forren 53'; Svendsen 56'; Høiland (yellow card) 70' | Stadium: Mjøndalen Arena; Attendance: 2,654; Referee: Espen Berntsen |

| 30 May 2015 11 | Molde | 6–1 | Sandefjord | Molde |
| 18:00 CEST (UTC+2) | Linnes 13'; Elyounoussi 40', 42', 49'; Høiland 77', 90' | Summary | Larsen (yellow card) 27'; Mjelde 38'; Bindia (yellow card) 57'; Risholt (yellow card) 64' | Stadium: Aker Stadion; Attendance: 8,393; Referee: Svein-Erik Edvartsen |

| 5 June 2015 12 | Tromsø | 2–0 | Molde | Tromsø |
| 19:00 CEST (UTC+2) | Antonsen 8'; Ondrášek (penalty missed); Hansson 31' | Summary | Nyland (yellow card) 12'; Singh (yellow card) 70'; Hløiland (yellow card) 75' | Stadium: Alfheim Stadion; Attendance: 3,130; Referee: Trygve Tjensli |

| 20 June 2015 13 | Molde | 0–0 | Vålerenga | Molde |
| 18:00 CEST (UTC+2) | Hussain (yellow card) 26' | Summary | Wæhler (yellow card) 51'; Zahid (yellow card) 62'; Stengel (yellow card) 66' | Stadium: Aker Stadion; Attendance: 9,332; Referee: Kim Andre Johnsen |

| 27 June 2015 14 | Rosenborg | 1–1 | Molde | Trondheim |
| 18:00 CEST (UTC+2) | Søderlund 32'; Skjelvik (yellow card) 63' | Summary | Hansen 34' (o.g.); Forren (yellow card) 50'; Høiland (yellow card) 90' | Stadium: Lerkendal Stadion; Attendance: 21,401; Referee: Tore Hansen |

| 3 July 2015 15 | Sarpsborg 08 | 1–4 | Molde | Sarpsborg |
| 19:00 CEST (UTC+2) | Bellaïd (yellow card) 67'; Zajić 90+1' | Summary | Kamara 7', 57', 90+1'; Svendsen 21' | Stadium: Sarpsborg Stadion; Attendance: 3,588; Referee: Tommy Skjerven |

| 10 July 2015 16 | Molde | 0–1 | Haugesund | Molde |
| 19:00 CEST (UTC+2) | Semb Berge (yellow card) 33'; Toivio (yellow card) 90' | Summary | Diedhiou 8'; Cvetinović (yellow card) 74'; Bråtveit (yellow card) 90+3' | Stadium: Aker Stadion; Attendance: 9,355; Referee: Omar Rafiq |

| 18 July 2015 18 | Molde | 1–2 | Bodø/Glimt | Molde |
| 18:00 CEST (UTC+2) | Linnes 43'; Horvath (yellow card) 60'; Forren (yellow card) 89'; Singh (yellow card) 90+2' (yellow-red card) 90+3' | Summary | Valentin 21'; Konradsen 36'; Furebotn (yellow card) 57' | Stadium: Aker Stadion; Attendance: 9,573; Referee: Tom Harald Hagen |

| 25 July 2015 17 | Strømsgodset | Postponed^{1} | Molde | Drammen |
| CEST (UTC+2) | | [ Summary] | | Stadium: Marienlyst Stadion |

| 9 August 2015 19 | Odd | 2–2 | Molde | Skien |
| 20:00 CEST (UTC+2) | Bentley 57'; Occéan 74' (pen.) | Summary | Elyounoussi 14'; Toivio 36'; Linde (red card) 72' | Stadium: Skagerak Arena; Attendance: 7,993; Referee: Tom Harald Hagen |

| 15 August 2015 20 | Molde | 0–0 | Sarpsborg 08 | Molde |
| 15:30 CEST (UTC+2) | Flo (yellow card) 78'; Moström (yellow card) 90+3' | Summary | Kronberg (yellow card) 90+4' | Stadium: Aker Stadion; Attendance: 8,157; Referee: Ole Gya |

| 23 August 2015 21 | Vålerenga | 0–1 | Molde | Oslo |
| 15:30 CEST (UTC+2) | Wæhler (yellow card) 33'; Näsberg (yellow card) 80'; Holm (yellow card) 81' | Summary | Flo 13' | Stadium: Ullevaal Stadion; Attendance: 9,203; Referee: Dag Vidar Hafsås |

| 30 August 2015 22 | Molde | 2–2 | Lillestrøm | Molde |
| 15:30 CEST (UTC+2) | Simonsen (yellow card) 23'; Høiland 54'; Moström 81' | Summary | Innocent (yellow card) 10'; Timisela (yellow card) 17'; Martin 24'; Kolstad (yellow card) 28'; Friday (yellow card) 77' (goal) 86' | Stadium: Aker Stadion; Attendance: 8,318; Referee: Kai Erik Steen |

| 12 September 2015 23 | Sandefjord | 2–4 | Molde | Sandefjord |
| 18:00 CEST (UTC+2) | Mjelde 26'; Larsen (yellow card) 42'; Bindia 90' | Summary | Kamara 25', 43'; Svendsen (red card) 45+1'; Hussain 67'; Elyounoussi 79' | Stadium: Komplett.no Arena; Attendance: 3,317; Referee: Trond Ivar Døvle |

| 20 September 2015 24 | Molde | 1–0 | Rosenborg | Molde |
| 18:00 CEST (UTC+2) | Kamara 58'; Høiland (yellow card) 86' | Summary | Jensen (yellow card) 3'; Svensson (yellow card) 70' | Stadium: Aker Stadion; Attendance: 11,113; Referee: Svein Oddvar Moen |

| 23 September 2015 17 | Strømsgodset | 1–0 | Molde | Drammen |
| 18:00 CEST (UTC+2) | Pedersen 18'; Abu (yellow card) 27'; Madsen (yellow card) 58' | Summary | Toivio (yellow card) 32' | Stadium: Marienlyst Stadion; Attendance: 6,502; Referee: Ola Hobber Nilsen |

| 27 September 2015 25 | Stabæk | 1–0 | Molde | Bærum |
| 20:00 CEST (UTC+2) | Keita 14' | Summary | Forren (yellow card) 36' | Stadium: Nadderud Stadion; Attendance: 3,538; Referee: Tommy Skjerven |

| 4 October 2015 26 | Molde | 4–0 | Tromsø | Molde |
| 18:00 CEST (UTC+2) | E.Hestad 19'; Simonsen 36'; Flo 54'; Kamara 79' (pen.) | Summary | Oršulić (yellow card) 59' (yellow-red card) 77' | Stadium: Aker Stadion; Attendance: 8,378; Referee: Tom Harald Hagen |

| 18 October 2015 27 | Molde | 3–1 | Mjøndalen | Molde |
| 15:30 CEST (UTC+2) | Kamara 54'; Svendsen 63'; Singh 86' | Summary | Nguen 79' | Stadium: Aker Stadion; Attendance: 8,141; Referee: Trygve Kjensli |

| 25 October 2015 28 | Aalesund | 1–2 | Molde | Ålesund |
| 15:30 CET (UTC+1) | James 39'; Skagestad (yellow card) 79' | Summary | Høiland 15' (yellow card) 38'; Singh (yellow card) 75'; Elyounoussi 76' | Stadium: Color Line Stadion; Attendance: 8,023; Referee: Svein-Erik Edvartsen |

| 1 November 2015 29 | Molde | 4–1 | Viking | Molde |
| 18:00 CET (UTC+1) | Moström 1'; Berge 52'; Elyounoussi 55'; Bakenga 83' | Summary | Haugen (yellow card) 19'; Thioune (yellow card) 45+1'; Sverrisson 80' | Stadium: Aker Stadion; Attendance: 8,220; Referee: Ola Hobber Nilsen |

| 8 November 2015 30 | Start | 0–3 | Molde | Kristiansand |
| 18:00 CET (UTC+1) | Børufsen (yellow card) 38' | Summary | Svendsen 22'; Gabrielsen 42'; Flo 72' | Stadium: Sør Arena; Attendance: 5,914; Referee: Dag Vidar Hafsås |

==== Table ====
| Pos | Team | Pld | W | D | L | GF | GA | GD | Pts | Qualification or relegation |
|---|---|---|---|---|---|---|---|---|---|---|
| 4 | Odd | 30 | 15 | 10 | 5 | 61 | 41 | +20 | 55 | Qualification for the Europa League first qualifying round |
| 5 | Viking | 30 | 17 | 2 | 11 | 53 | 39 | +14 | 53 | |
| 6 | Molde | 30 | 15 | 7 | 8 | 62 | 31 | +31 | 52 | |
| 7 | Vålerenga | 30 | 14 | 7 | 9 | 49 | 41 | +8 | 49 | |
| 8 | Lillestrøm (Note: Lillestrøm started the season with a one point deduction due to poor financial reporting.) | 30 | 12 | 9 | 9 | 45 | 43 | +2 | 44 | |

Source: Football Association of Norway (in Norwegian), Soccerway
Rules for classification: 1) Points; 2) Goal difference; 3) Goals scored; 4) Head-to-head points; 5) Head-to-head goal difference; 6) Head-to-head away goals scored (between two teams).

=== Norwegian Cup ===
| 22 April 2015 First Round | Brattvåg | 0–2 | Molde | Brattvåg |
| 18:00 CEST (UTC+2) | | Summary | Høiland 37'; Svendsen 80' | Stadium: Brattvåg gras Attendance: 732; Referee: Mathias Smehus Kringstad |

| 7 May 2015 Second Round | Træff | 0–2 | Molde | Molde |
| 18:00 CEST (UTC+2) | Neergaard (yellow card) 81' | Summary | Agnaldo 3'; Svendsen 47' | Stadium: Reknesbanen; Attendance: 1,150; Referee: Mathias Smehus Kringstad |

| 2 June 2015 Third round | Fyllingsdalen | 0–4 | Molde | Bergen |
| 18:00 CEST (UTC+2) | | Summary | Kamara 23' (pen.); Diouf 28'; Bendiksen 42'; Hussain (yellow card) 49'; Agnaldo 64' | Stadium: Varden Amfi; Attendance: 1,150; Referee: Ole Gya |

| 24 June 2015 Fourth Round | Molde | 3–0 | Kvik Halden | Molde |
| 19:00 CEST (UTC+2) | Kamara 11'; Høiland 25' (pen.); O.Strømsborg 65' (o.g.) | Summary | | Stadium: Aker Stadion; Attendance: 2,424; Referee: Trond Ivar Døvle |

| 12 August 2015 Quarterfinal | Viking | 3–0 | Molde | Stavanger |
| 20:00 CEST (UTC+2) | Adegbenro 22'; Böðvarsson 37'; Sigurðsson (yellow card) 67' (goal) 84'; Mets (yellow card) 90+4' | Summary | Rindarøy (yellow card) 24'; Elyounoussi (yellow card) 55'; Hussain (yellow card) 66'; Forren (yellow card) 83' | Stadium: Viking Stadion; Attendance: 7,864; Referee: Tore Hansen |

=== UEFA Champions League ===
==== Qualifying rounds ====
| 14 July 2015 Second qualifying round 1st leg | Molde (Norway) | 5–0 | (Armenia) Pyunik | Molde, Norway |
| 20:00 CEST (UTC+2) | Elyounoussi 35', 44'; Hussain (yellow card) 81'; Kamara 84', 90+2'; Moström 90+5' | Summary | | Stadium: Aker Stadion; Attendance: 5,650; Referee: Pavle Radovanović (Montenegro) |

| 21 July 2015 Second qualifying round 2nd leg | Pyunik (Armenia) | 1–0 (1–5 agg.) | (Norway) Molde | Yerevan, Armenia |
| 16:00 CEST (UTC+2) | Gh.Poghosyan (yellow card) 71'; Badoyan 75' | Summary | | Stadium: Vazgen Sargsyan Republican Stadium; Attendance: 2,500; Referee: Anatoliy Abdula (Ukraine) |

| 28 July 2015 Third qualifying round 1st leg | Dinamo Zagreb (Croatia) | 1–1 | (Norway) Molde | Zagreb, Croatia |
| 21:00 CEST (UTC+2) | Henríquez 18' (yellow card) 84'; Machado (red card) 65'; Rog (yellow card) 80' | Summary | Kamara 21'; Hussain (yellow card) 52'; Rindarøy (yellow card) 55'; Hestad (yellow card) 62' | Stadium: Stadion Maksimir; Attendance: 9,327; Referee: Serge Gumienny (Belgium) |

| 4 August 2015 Third qualifying round 2nd leg | Molde (Norway) | 3–3 (4–4(a) agg.) | (Croatia) Dinamo Zagreb | Molde, Norway |
| 19:00 CEST (UTC+2) | Hussain 43' (yellow card) 87'; Forren (yellow card) 45+1' (yellow-red card) 72'; Singh (penalty missed); Elyounoussi 52' (pen.); Kamara (penalty missed) 75' | Summary | Pjaca 17'; Ademi 20'; Rog 22'; Gonçalo Santos (yellow card) 31'; Eduardo (yellow card) 51'; Antolić (yellow card) 80'; Hodžić (yellow card) 87'; Ivo Pinto (yellow card) 90+5' | Stadium: Aker Stadion; Attendance: 7,017; Referee: Michael Oliver (England) |

=== UEFA Europa League ===
==== Qualifying rounds ====
| 20 August 2015 Play-off round 1st Leg | Molde (Norway) | 2–0 | (Belgium) Standard Liège | Molde, Norway |
| 19:00 CEST (UTC+2) | Moström (yellow card) 16'; Høiland 24'; Elyounoussi 28'; Horvath (yellow card) 90+3' | Summary | Enoh (yellow card) 65'; Knockaert (yellow card) 75'; Van Damme (yellow card) 90+2' | Stadium: Aker Stadion; Attendance: 3 940; Referee: Aliaksei Kulbakov (Belarus) |

| 27 August 2015 Play-off round 2nd Leg | Standard Liège (Belgium) | 3–1 (3–3(a) agg.) | (Norway) Molde | Liège, Belgium |
| 20:30 CEST (UTC+2) | Trebel (yellow card) 13' (goal) 90+5'; Knockaert 26' (yellow card) 90'; Santini 48'; Faty (yellow card) 54'; Yattara (yellow card) 56'; Enoh (yellow card) 90+1' | Report | Flo (yellow card) 23'; Hussain 42'; Singh (yellow card) 44'; Toivio (yellow card) 81'; Høiland (yellow card) 90'; Forren (yellow card) 90' | Stadium: Stade Maurice Dufrasne; Attendance: 12,568; Referee: Alexandru Tudor (Romania) |

==== Group stage ====
On 28 August 2015, the draw for the group stage was made in Monaco. Molde faced Ajax, Celtic and Fenerbahçe in Group A. Molde topped the group with eleven points, and were drawn against Spanish football side Sevilla FC in the Round of 32.

| Pos | Team | Pld | W | D | L | GF | GA | GD | Pts | Qualification |
|---|---|---|---|---|---|---|---|---|---|---|
| 1 | (Norway) Molde | 6 | 3 | 2 | 1 | 10 | 7 | +3 | 11 | Advance to knockout phase |
| 2 | (Turkey) Fenerbahçe | 6 | 2 | 3 | 1 | 7 | 6 | +1 | 9 | Advance to knockout phase |
| 3 | (Netherlands) Ajax | 6 | 1 | 4 | 1 | 6 | 6 | 0 | 7 | |
| 4 | (Scotland) Celtic | 6 | 0 | 3 | 3 | 8 | 12 | −4 | 3 | |

Source: Soccerway
Rules for classification: Group stage tiebreakers

| 17 September 2015 1 | Fenerbahçe (Turkey) | 1–3 | (Norway) Molde | Istanbul, Turkey |
| 19:00 CEST (UTC+2) | Topal (yellow card) 24'; Nani (yellow card) 35' (goal) 42'; Potuk (yellow card) 79' | Report | Elyounoussi 53' (yellow card) 25' (yellow-red card) 84'; Høiland 36' (pen.); Linnes 65' | Stadium: Şükrü Saracoğlu Stadium; Attendance: 31,209; Referee: Benoît Bastien (France) |

| 1 October 2015 2 | Molde (Norway) | 1–1 | (Netherlands) Ajax | Molde, Norway |
| 21:05 CEST (UTC+2) | E.Hestad 8'; Høiland (yellow card) 27' | Report | Tete (yellow card) 9'; Fischer 19'; Veltman (yellow card) 40'; Riedewald (yellow card) 79'; Gudelj (yellow card) 90+4' | Stadium: Aker Stadion; Attendance: 7,890; Referee: Paweł Raczkowski (Poland) |

| 22 October 2015 3 | Molde (Norway) | 3–1 | (Scotland) Celtic | Molde, Norway |
| 21:05 CEST (UTC+2) | Kamara 11'; Forren 18'; Elyounoussi 56' | Report | Commons 55'; Ambrose (yellow card) 82' | Stadium: Aker Stadion; Attendance: 9,166; Referee: Vladislav Bezborodov (Russia) |

| 5 November 2015 4 | Celtic (Scotland) | 1–2 | (Norway) Molde | Glasgow, Scotland |
| 21:05 CET (UTC+1) | Commons 26'; Lustig (yellow card) 30'; Johansen (yellow card) 66'; Bitton (red card) 76' | Report | Elyounoussi 21'; D.Hestad 37'; Linnes (yellow card) 38' | Stadium: Celtic Park; Attendance: 37,071; Referee: Slavko Vinčić (Slovenia) |

| 26 November 2015 5 | Molde (Norway) | 0–2 | (Turkey) Fenerbahçe | Molde, Norway |
| 21:05 CET (UTC+1) | Forren (yellow card) 7'; Gulbrandsen (yellow card) 8'; Singh (yellow card) 62'; Hussain (yellow card) 77'; K.Rindarøy (red card) 90+1' | Report | Kaldırım (yellow card) 23'; Kjær (yellow card) 55'; Alves (yellow card) 61'; Fernandão 68'; Kadlec (yellow card) 79'; Nani (yellow card) 81'; Tufan 84' | Stadium: Aker Stadion; Attendance: 8,235; Referee: Miroslav Zelinka (Czech Republic) |

| 10 December 2015 6 | Ajax (Netherlands) | 1–1 | (Norway) Molde | Amsterdam, Netherlands |
| 19:00 CET (UTC+1) | Van de Beek 14'; Gudelj (yellow card) 61' (yellow-red card) 90'; Klaassen (yellow card) 70'; Milik (yellow card) 70'; Riedewald (yellow card) 90+3' | Report | Singh 29'; Gulbrandsen (yellow card) 90+3' | Stadium: Amsterdam Arena; Attendance: 48,041; Referee: Yevhen Aranovsky (Ukraine) |

== Squad statistics ==
As of Match played 10 December 2015

=== Appearances and goals ===
| No. | Pos | Nat | Player | Total | | Tippeligaen | | Norwegian Cup | | Champions League | | Europa League | |
| No. | Pos | Nat | Player | Apps | Goals | Apps | Goals | Apps | Goals | Apps | Goals | Apps | Goals |
|---|---|---|---|---|---|---|---|---|---|---|---|---|---|
| 1 | GK | (United States) USA | Ethan Horvath | 30 | 0 | 15+2 | 0 | 2 | 0 | 3 | 0 | 8 | 0 |
| 2 | DF | (Norway) NOR | Fredrik Semb Berge | 12 | 1 | 10 | 1 | 2 | 0 | 0 | 0 | 0 | 0 |
| 3 | MF | (Senegal) SEN | Amidou Diop | 0 | 0 | 0 | 0 | 0 | 0 | 0 | 0 | 0 | 0 |
| 4 | DF | (Norway) NOR | Ruben Gabrielsen | 30 | 1 | 11+4 | 1 | 3+1 | 0 | 2+2 | 0 | 5+2 | 0 |
| 5 | DF | (Finland) FIN | Joona Toivio | 38 | 2 | 19+3 | 2 | 4 | 0 | 4 | 0 | 5+3 | 0 |
| 6 | MF | (Norway) NOR | Daniel Berg Hestad | 36 | 1 | 3+19 | 0 | 3 | 0 | 0+3 | 0 | 7+1 | 1 |
| 7 | MF | (Norway) NOR | Harmeet Singh | 38 | 2 | 25 | 1 | 2 | 0 | 3 | 0 | 8 | 1 |
| 8 | FW | (Norway) NOR | Fredrik Gulbrandsen | 2 | 0 | 0 | 0 | 0 | 0 | 0 | 0 | 1+1 | 0 |
| 9 | MF | (Sweden) SWE | Mattias Moström | 31 | 3 | 17+2 | 2 | 1 | 0 | 3+1 | 1 | 7 | 0 |
| 11 | FW | (Norway) NOR | Ola Kamara | 44 | 21 | 27+2 | 14 | 3+1 | 2 | 4 | 4 | 3+4 | 1 |
| 14 | DF | (Norway) NOR | Martin Linnes | 41 | 3 | 27+1 | 2 | 2 | 0 | 3 | 0 | 8 | 1 |
| 15 | DF | (Norway) NOR | Per-Egil Flo | 33 | 3 | 21+4 | 3 | 1+1 | 0 | 1+1 | 0 | 3+1 | 0 |
| 16 | MF | (Norway) NOR | Etzaz Hussain | 41 | 3 | 23+4 | 1 | 2+1 | 0 | 4 | 1 | 6+1 | 1 |
| 18 | DF | (Norway) NOR | Magne Simonsen | 4 | 1 | 3 | 1 | 0 | 0 | 0 | 0 | 0+1 | 0 |
| 19 | MF | (Norway) NOR | Eirik Hestad | 27 | 2 | 11+2 | 1 | 3+1 | 0 | 3 | 0 | 3+4 | 1 |
| 20 | FW | (Norway) NOR | Tommy Høiland | 35 | 13 | 12+11 | 9 | 3+2 | 2 | 0+2 | 0 | 4+1 | 2 |
| 21 | FW | (Brazil) BRA | Agnaldo | 20 | 3 | 5+9 | 1 | 3+2 | 2 | 0+1 | 0 | 0 | 0 |
| 22 | MF | (United States) USA | Joshua Gatt | 1 | 0 | 0+1 | 0 | 0 | 0 | 0 | 0 | 0 | 0 |
| 23 | DF | (Norway) NOR | Knut Olav Rindarøy | 24 | 0 | 9+2 | 0 | 5 | 0 | 3 | 0 | 5 | 0 |
| 24 | FW | (Norway) NOR | Mohamed Elyounoussi | 40 | 19 | 25+3 | 12 | 1 | 0 | 4 | 3 | 7 | 4 |
| 25 | DF | (Norway) NOR | Vegard Forren | 41 | 2 | 27 | 1 | 3 | 0 | 4 | 0 | 7 | 1 |
| 26 | GK | (Sweden) SWE | Andreas Linde | 4 | 0 | 2 | 0 | 1 | 0 | 1 | 0 | 0 | 0 |
| 27 | FW | (Norway) NOR | Mushaga Bakenga | 7 | 1 | 2+4 | 1 | 0 | 0 | 0 | 0 | 0+1 | 0 |
| 32 | FW | (Norway) NOR | Sander Svendsen | 36 | 10 | 20+6 | 8 | 1+3 | 2 | 2+1 | 0 | 1+2 | 0 |
| 34 | GK | (Brazil) BRA | Neydson | 1 | 0 | 0+1 | 0 | 0 | 0 | 0 | 0 | 0 | 0 |
| 48 | FW | (Norway) NOR | Erlend Hustad | 1 | 0 | 0 | 0 | 0+1 | 0 | 0 | 0 | 0 | 0 |
| 53 | DF | (Norway) NOR | Martin Ove Roseth | 1 | 1 | 0 | 0 | 0+1 | 1 | 0 | 0 | 0 | 0 |
Players away from Molde on loan:
| 10 | MF | (Norway) NOR | Thomas Kind Bendiksen | 11 | 1 | 2+4 | 0 | 4 | 1 | 0+1 | 0 | 0 | 0 |
| 30 | FW | (Senegal) SEN | Pape Paté Diouf | 11 | 1 | 1+6 | 0 | 4 | 1 | 0 | 0 | 0 | 0 |
| 33 | MF | (Norway) NOR | Andreas Hollingen | 0 | 0 | 0 | 0 | 0 | 0 | 0 | 0 | 0 | 0 |
| 37 | DF | (Norway) NOR | Ole Martin Rindarøy | 0 | 0 | 0 | 0 | 0 | 0 | 0 | 0 | 0 | 0 |
| 38 | MF | (Norway) NOR | Stian Rode Gregersen | 0 | 0 | 0 | 0 | 0 | 0 | 0 | 0 | 0 | 0 |
Players who appeared for Molde no longer at the club:
| 12 | GK | (Norway) NOR | Ørjan Nyland | 15 | 0 | 13 | 0 | 2 | 0 | 0 | 0 | 0 | 0 |
| 42 | MF | (Norway) NOR | Eirik Haugen | 1 | 0 | 0 | 0 | 0+1 | 0 | 0 | 0 | 0 | 0 |

=== Goal scorers ===
| Rank | Pos. | No. | Player | Tippeligaen | Norwegian Cup | Champions League | Europa League | Total |
|---|---|---|---|---|---|---|---|---|
| 1 | FW | 11 | (Norway) Ola Kamara | 14 | 2 | 4 | 1 | 21 |
| 2 | FW | 24 | (Norway) Mohamed Elyounoussi | 12 | 0 | 3 | 4 | 19 |
| 3 | FW | 20 | (Norway) Tommy Høiland | 9 | 2 | 0 | 2 | 13 |
| 4 | FW | 32 | (Norway) Sander Svendsen | 8 | 2 | 0 | 0 | 10 |
| 5 | DF | 15 | (Norway) Per Egil Flo | 3 | 0 | 0 | 0 | 3 |
| 5 | DF | 14 | (Norway) Martin Linnes | 2 | 0 | 0 | 1 | 3 |
| 5 | MF | 9 | (Sweden) Mattias Moström | 2 | 0 | 1 | 0 | 3 |
| 5 | FW | 21 | (Brazil) Agnaldo | 1 | 2 | 0 | 0 | 3 |
| 5 | MF | 16 | (Norway) Etzaz Hussain | 1 | 0 | 1 | 1 | 3 |
| 10 | DF | 5 | (Finland) Joona Toivio | 2 | 0 | 0 | 0 | 2 |
| 10 | MF | 19 | (Norway) Eirik Hestad | 1 | 0 | 0 | 1 | 2 |
| 10 | DF | 25 | (Norway) Vegard Forren | 1 | 0 | 0 | 1 | 2 |
| 10 | MF | 7 | (Norway) Harmeet Singh | 1 | 0 | 0 | 1 | 2 |
| 14 | DF | 18 | (Norway) Magne Simonsen | 1 | 0 | 0 | 0 | 1 |
| 14 | DF | 2 | (Norway) Fredrik Semb Berge | 1 | 0 | 0 | 0 | 1 |
| 14 | FW | 27 | (Norway) Mushaga Bakenga | 1 | 0 | 0 | 0 | 1 |
| 14 | DF | 4 | (Norway) Ruben Gabrielsen | 1 | 0 | 0 | 0 | 1 |
| 14 | FW | 30 | (Senegal) Pape Paté Diouf | 0 | 1 | 0 | 0 | 1 |
| 14 | MF | 10 | (Norway) Thomas Kind Bendiksen | 0 | 1 | 0 | 0 | 1 |
| 14 | MF | 6 | (Norway) Daniel Berg Hestad | 0 | 0 | 0 | 1 | 1 |
| | | | Own goals | 1 | 1 | 0 | 0 | 2 |
| TOTALS | | | | 62 | 11 | 9 | 13 | 95 |

=== Disciplinary record ===
| Number | Nation | Position | Name | Tippeligaen | | Norwegian Cup | | Champions League | | Europa League | | Total | |
| Number | Nation | Position | Name | Yellow card | Red card | Yellow card | Red card | Yellow card | Red card | Yellow card | Red card | Yellow card | Red card |
| 1 | (United States) | GK | Ethan Horvath | 1 | 0 | 0 | 0 | 0 | 0 | 1 | 0 | 2 | 0 |
| 2 | (Norway) | DF | Fredrik Semb Berge | 1 | 0 | 0 | 0 | 0 | 0 | 0 | 0 | 1 | 0 |
| 5 | (Finland) | DF | Joona Toivio | 4 | 0 | 0 | 0 | 0 | 0 | 1 | 0 | 5 | 0 |
| 7 | (Norway) | MF | Harmeet Singh | 3 | 1 | 0 | 0 | 0 | 0 | 2 | 0 | 5 | 1 |
| 8 | (Norway) | FW | Fredrik Gulbrandsen | 0 | 0 | 0 | 0 | 0 | 0 | 2 | 0 | 2 | 0 |
| 9 | (Sweden) | MF | Mattias Moström | 2 | 0 | 0 | 0 | 0 | 0 | 1 | 0 | 3 | 0 |
| 12 | (Norway) | GK | Ørjan Nyland | 1 | 0 | 0 | 0 | 0 | 0 | 0 | 0 | 1 | 0 |
| 14 | (Norway) | DF | Martin Linnes | 0 | 0 | 0 | 0 | 0 | 0 | 1 | 0 | 1 | 0 |
| 15 | (Norway) | DF | Per Egil Flo | 1 | 0 | 0 | 0 | 0 | 0 | 1 | 0 | 2 | 0 |
| 16 | (Norway) | MF | Etzaz Hussain | 2 | 0 | 2 | 0 | 3 | 0 | 1 | 0 | 8 | 0 |
| 18 | (Norway) | DF | Magne Simonsen | 1 | 0 | 0 | 0 | 0 | 0 | 0 | 0 | 1 | 0 |
| 19 | (Norway) | MF | Eirik Hestad | 0 | 0 | 0 | 0 | 1 | 0 | 0 | 0 | 1 | 0 |
| 20 | (Norway) | FW | Tommy Høiland | 5 | 0 | 0 | 0 | 0 | 0 | 2 | 0 | 7 | 0 |
| 23 | (Norway) | DF | Knut Olav Rindarøy | 0 | 0 | 1 | 0 | 1 | 0 | 0 | 1 | 2 | 1 |
| 24 | (Norway) | FW | Mohamed Elyounoussi | 0 | 0 | 1 | 0 | 0 | 0 | 2 | 1 | 3 | 1 |
| 25 | (Norway) | DF | Vegard Forren | 5 | 0 | 1 | 0 | 0 | 1 | 2 | 0 | 8 | 1 |
| 26 | (Sweden) | GK | Andreas Linde | 0 | 1 | 0 | 0 | 0 | 0 | 0 | 0 | 0 | 1 |
| 30 | (Senegal) | FW | Pape Paté Diouf | 1 | 0 | 0 | 0 | 0 | 0 | 0 | 0 | 1 | 0 |
| 32 | (Norway) | FW | Sander Svendsen | 0 | 1 | 0 | 0 | 0 | 0 | 0 | 0 | 0 | 1 |
| | | | TOTALS | 27 | 3 | 5 | 0 | 5 | 1 | 16 | 2 | 53 | 6 |

== See also ==
- Molde FK seasons

== Notes ==
- Strømsgodset versus Molde was postponed on 25 July 2015 due to both clubs participation in European competition the following week.
