= 2012 Tippeligaen =

68th season of top-tier football league in Norway

Tippeligaen
- Season: 2012
- Dates: 23 March – 18 November
- Champions: Molde; 2nd title
- Relegated: Fredrikstad; Stabæk
- Champions League: Molde
- Europa League: Strømsgodset; Rosenborg; Hødd (via cup)
- Matches: 240
- Goals: 693 (2.89 per match)
- Top goalscorer: Zdeněk Ondrášek, Péter Kovács (14)
- Biggest home win: Lillestrøm 6–0 Stabæk (4 November 2012)
- Biggest away win: Stabæk 0–5 Molde (12 May 2012)
- Highest scoring: Brann 6–2 Odd Grenland (15 July 2012)
- Longest winning run: 5 matches - Molde, Viking
- Longest unbeaten run: 13 matches - Rosenborg
- Longest winless run: 13 games - Hønefoss
- Longest losing run: 9 matches - Stabæk
- Highest attendance: 20,572; Rosenborg v Hønefoss (16 May 2012)
- Lowest attendance: 1,876; Hønefoss v Haugesund (29 July 2012)
- Average attendance: 7,005 ▼12.3%

The 2012 Tippeligaen was the 68th completed season of top division football in Norway. The competition began on 23 March 2012 and ended on 18 November 2012, with a summer break from 28 May to 30 June. Molde were the defending champions, while Hønefoss and Sandnes Ulf entered as the promoted teams from the 2011 1. divisjon. They replaced Start and Sarpsborg 08 who were relegated to the 2012 1. divisjon.

On 11 November 2011, Molde won the title with one matchday left to play after a 1–0 home win over Hønefoss. It was their second consecutive league title and also their second top-flight title overall.

== Season summary ==
Strømsgodset were leading the league most of the season, but four matches before the end of the season there were three teams competing for the title. Rosenborg lost out on the title-race after losing to Strømsgodset and Molde. Molde secured the title in the 29th round after they won 1–0 at home, while Strømsgodset lost 2–1 against Sandnes Ulf.

Stabæk were relegated after being positioned at the bottom of the table throughout the season. Ahead of the last round, four teams were fighting against relegation, but Fredrikstad lost their match against the league-winners Molde and were relegated, while Sandnes Ulf finished 14th and played relegation play-offs against Ullensaker/Kisa, the sixth-placed team in the 1. divisjon. Sandnes Ulf won the play-offs 7–1 on aggregate (4–0 away and 3–1 at home), and were not relegated.

The average attendance in 2012 were 7,014 spectators, down from 7,995 in 2011, which was the lowest average attendance in Tippeligaen since 2003.

== Teams ==
Sixteen teams competed in the league – the top fourteen teams from the previous season and the two teams promoted from the 1. divisjon The promoted teams were Hønefoss (returning after a season's absence) and Sandnes Ulf (their first post-World War II top-flight season). They replaced Sarpsborg 08 (relegated after their first ever presence) and Start (ending their three-year spell in the top flight).

=== Stadiums and locations ===
Locations of the teams in 2012 Tippeligaen

Note: Table lists in alphabetical order.

| Team | Ap. | Location | Arena | Turf | Cap. | Manager |
|---|---|---|---|---|---|---|
| Aalesund | 11 | Ålesund | Color Line Stadion | Artificial | 10,778 | (Norway) Kjetil Rekdal |
| Brann | 56 | Bergen | Brann Stadion | Natural | 17,824 | (Norway) Rune Skarsfjord |
| Fredrikstad | 42 | Fredrikstad | Fredrikstad Stadion | Natural | 13,300 | (Norway) Trond Amundsen |
| Haugesund | 6 | Haugesund | Haugesund Stadion | Natural | 5,000 | (Norway) Jostein Grindhaug |
| Hønefoss | 2 | Hønefoss | Aka Arena | Artificial | 4,000 | (Norway) Leif Gunnar Smerud |
| Lillestrøm | 49 | Lillestrøm | Åråsen stadion | Natural | 11,637 | (Sweden) Magnus Haglund |
| Molde | 36 | Molde | Aker Stadion | Natural | 11,800 | (Norway) Ole Gunnar Solskjær |
| Odd Grenland | 31 | Skien | Skagerak Arena | Artificial | 13,500 | (Norway) Dag-Eilev Fagermo |
| Rosenborg | 49 | Trondheim | Lerkendal Stadion | Natural | 21,850 | (Sweden) Jan Jönsson |
| Sandnes Ulf | 3 | Sandnes | Sandnes Idrettspark | Natural | 3,850 | (Norway) Asle Andersen |
| Sogndal | 14 | Sogndalsfjøra | Fosshaugane Campus | Natural | 5,402 | (Sweden) Jonas Olsson |
| Stabæk | 17 | Bærum | Nadderud Stadion | Natural | 7,000 | (Norway) Petter Belsvik |
| Strømsgodset | 25 | Drammen | Marienlyst Stadion | Artificial | 7,500 | (Norway) Ronny Deila |
| Tromsø | 26 | Tromsø | Alfheim Stadion | Artificial | 7,500 | (Norway) Per-Mathias Høgmo |
| Vålerenga | 52 | Oslo | Ullevaal Stadion | Natural | 25,572 | (Norway) Martin Andresen |
| Viking | 63 | Stavanger | Viking Stadion | Natural | 16,600 | (Sweden) Kjell Jonevret |

| Aalesund | Brann | Fredrikstad | Haugesund |
|---|---|---|---|
| Color Line Stadion | Brann Stadion | Fredrikstad Stadion | Haugesund Stadion |
| Capacity: 10,778 | Capacity: 17,824 | Capacity: 13,300 | Capacity: 5,000 |
| Hønefoss | Lillestrøm | Molde | Odd Grenland |
| Aka Arena | Åråsen Stadion | Aker Stadion | Skagerak Arena |
| Capacity: 4,000 | Capacity: 11,637 | Capacity: 11,800 | Capacity: 13,500 |
| Rosenborg | Sandnes Ulf | Sogndal | Stabæk |
| Lerkendal Stadion | Sandnes Idrettspark | Fosshaugane Campus | Nadderud Stadion |
| Capacity: 21,850 | Capacity: 3,850 | Capacity: 5,402 | Capacity: 7,000 |
| Strømsgodset | Tromsø | Vålerenga | Viking |
| Marienlyst Stadion | Alfheim Stadion | Ullevaal Stadion | Viking Stadion |
| Capacity: 7,500 | Capacity: 7,500 | Capacity: 25,572 | Capacity: 16,600 |

=== Managerial changes ===
| Team | Outgoing manager | Manner of departure | Date of vacancy | Incoming manager | Date of appointment | Table |
|---|---|---|---|---|---|---|
| Sogndal | (Norway) Harald Aabrekk | End of contract | 31 December 2011 | (Sweden) Jonas Olsson | 1 January 2012 | Pre-Season |
| Lillestrøm | (Norway) Petter Belsvik (Sweden) Magnus Powell (caretakers) | End of contract | 31 December 2011 | (Sweden) Magnus Haglund | 1 January 2012 | Pre-Season |
| Stabæk | (Sweden) Jörgen Lennartsson | Signed by IF Elfsborg | 31 December 2011 | (Norway) Petter Belsvik | 2 January 2012 | Pre-Season |
| Fredrikstad | (Norway) Tom Freddy Aune | Resigned | 10 May 2012 | (Norway) Trond Amundsen | 10 May 2012 | 13th |
| Viking | (Norway) Åge Hareide | Sacked | 9 June 2012 | (Sweden) Kjell Jonevret | 19 June 2012 | 10th |

== League table ==
| Pos | Team | Pld | W | D | L | GF | GA | GD | Pts | Qualification or relegation |
|---|---|---|---|---|---|---|---|---|---|---|
| 1 | Molde (C) | 30 | 19 | 5 | 6 | 51 | 31 | +20 | 62 | Qualification for the Champions League second qualifying round |
| 2 | Strømsgodset | 30 | 17 | 7 | 6 | 62 | 40 | +22 | 58 | Qualification for the Europa League second qualifying round (Note: Hødd, which played in the 2012 First Division, also qualified for the 2013–14 UEFA Europa League second qualifying round as winners of the 2012 Norwegian Cup.) |
| 3 | Rosenborg | 30 | 15 | 10 | 5 | 53 | 26 | +27 | 55 | Qualification for the Europa League first qualifying round (Note: Tromsø qualified for the first qualifying round of the UEFA Europa League via the UEFA Fair Play ranking.) |
| 4 | Tromsø | 30 | 14 | 7 | 9 | 45 | 32 | +13 | 49 | Qualification for the Europa League first qualifying round |
| 5 | Viking | 30 | 14 | 7 | 9 | 41 | 36 | +5 | 49 | |
| 6 | Brann | 30 | 13 | 3 | 14 | 57 | 50 | +7 | 42 | |
| 7 | Haugesund | 30 | 11 | 9 | 10 | 46 | 40 | +6 | 42 | |
| 8 | Vålerenga | 30 | 12 | 5 | 13 | 42 | 44 | −2 | 41 | |
| 9 | Lillestrøm | 30 | 9 | 12 | 9 | 46 | 47 | −1 | 39 | |
| 10 | Odd Grenland | 30 | 11 | 7 | 12 | 40 | 43 | −3 | 39 (Note: Odd Grenland were deducted 1 point for lack of financial control) | |
| 11 | Aalesund | 30 | 9 | 11 | 10 | 40 | 41 | −1 | 38 | |
| 12 | Sogndal | 30 | 8 | 10 | 12 | 29 | 37 | −8 | 34 | |
| 13 | Hønefoss | 30 | 7 | 12 | 11 | 30 | 42 | −12 | 33 | |
| 14 | Sandnes Ulf (O) | 30 | 8 | 8 | 14 | 44 | 56 | −12 | 32 | Qualification for the relegation play-offs |
| 15 | Fredrikstad (R) | 30 | 9 | 3 | 18 | 42 | 59 | −17 | 30 | Relegation to First Division |
| 16 | Stabæk (R) | 30 | 5 | 2 | 23 | 25 | 69 | −44 | 17 | Relegation to First Division |

Source: fotball.no
Rules for classification: 1) points; 2) goal difference; 3) number of goals scored.
(C) Champions; (O) Play-off winners; (R) Relegated

== Positions by round ==
| Team ╲ Round | 1 | 2 | 3 | 4 | 5 | 6 | 7 | 8 | 9 | 10 | 11 | 12 | 13 | 14 | 15 | 16 | 17 | 18 | 19 | 20 | 21 | 22 | 23 | 24 | 25 | 26 | 27 | 28 | 29 | 30 |
|---|---|---|---|---|---|---|---|---|---|---|---|---|---|---|---|---|---|---|---|---|---|---|---|---|---|---|---|---|---|---|
| Molde | 3 | 10 | 3 | 9 | 6 | 8 | 7 | 3 | 2 | 2 | 2 | 1 | 2 | 2 | 2 | 2 | 2 | 2 | 2 | 1 | 2 | 2 | 1 | 1 | 1 | 2 | 1 | 1 | 1 | 1 |
| Strømsgodset | 13 | 8 | 8 | 3 | 3 | 1 | 1 | 2 | 1 | 1 | 1 | 2 | 1 | 1 | 1 | 1 | 1 | 1 | 1 | 2 | 1 | 1 | 2 | 2 | 3 | 3 | 3 | 2 | 2 | 2 |
| Rosenborg | 2 | 2 | 5 | 2 | 1 | 3 | 2 | 1 | 3 | 5 | 4 | 5 | 4 | 3 | 3 | 3 | 3 | 3 | 3 | 3 | 3 | 3 | 3 | 3 | 2 | 1 | 2 | 3 | 3 | 3 |
| Tromsø | 5 | 4 | 1 | 1 | 2 | 5 | 6 | 4 | 5 | 4 | 5 | 4 | 5 | 5 | 5 | 7 | 7 | 9 | 9 | 6 | 4 | 4 | 5 | 4 | 4 | 4 | 4 | 4 | 4 | 4 |
| Viking | 7 | 3 | 9 | 5 | 8 | 12 | 11 | 10 | 11 | 12 | 10 | 10 | 12 | 13 | 11 | 9 | 8 | 6 | 4 | 5 | 8 | 6 | 6 | 7 | 8 | 6 | 5 | 5 | 5 | 5 |
| Brann | 15 | 7 | 12 | 12 | 14 | 14 | 14 | 13 | 12 | 13 | 11 | 11 | 8 | 10 | 9 | 8 | 9 | 7 | 5 | 7 | 5 | 5 | 4 | 6 | 5 | 5 | 6 | 6 | 6 | 6 |
| Haugesund | 12 | 6 | 7 | 10 | 7 | 4 | 4 | 5 | 4 | 3 | 3 | 3 | 3 | 4 | 4 | 4 | 5 | 4 | 7 | 4 | 6 | 7 | 7 | 8 | 7 | 8 | 8 | 8 | 7 | 7 |
| Vålerenga | 4 | 9 | 2 | 4 | 9 | 7 | 3 | 6 | 8 | 9 | 8 | 8 | 10 | 7 | 6 | 5 | 6 | 8 | 8 | 9 | 7 | 8 | 8 | 5 | 6 | 7 | 7 | 7 | 8 | 8 |
| Lillestrøm | 10 | 11 | 15 | 13 | 15 | 15 | 15 | 15 | 14 | 14 | 14 | 14 | 15 | 14 | 12 | 13 | 13 | 11 | 11 | 11 | 12 | 12 | 12 | 12 | 12 | 12 | 11 | 10 | 9 | 9 |
| Odd Grenland | 16 | 16 | 13 | 14 | 13 | 11 | 10 | 9 | 9 | 7 | 12 | 12 | 13 | 11 | 14 | 12 | 11 | 12 | 12 | 12 | 11 | 11 | 11 | 11 | 11 | 11 | 10 | 11 | 10 | 10 |
| Aalesund | 8 | 12 | 11 | 8 | 10 | 10 | 12 | 11 | 13 | 8 | 7 | 7 | 9 | 8 | 8 | 10 | 10 | 10 | 10 | 10 | 9 | 10 | 10 | 10 | 10 | 9 | 9 | 9 | 11 | 11 |
| Sogndal | 1 | 1 | 4 | 6 | 4 | 2 | 5 | 7 | 10 | 11 | 13 | 13 | 11 | 12 | 10 | 11 | 12 | 13 | 13 | 14 | 13 | 15 | 14 | 13 | 13 | 13 | 13 | 13 | 14 | 12 |
| Hønefoss BK | 9 | 13 | 10 | 7 | 5 | 6 | 9 | 12 | 6 | 6 | 6 | 6 | 6 | 6 | 7 | 6 | 4 | 5 | 6 | 8 | 10 | 9 | 9 | 9 | 9 | 10 | 12 | 12 | 12 | 13 |
| Sandnes Ulf | 6 | 14 | 14 | 15 | 12 | 9 | 8 | 8 | 7 | 10 | 9 | 9 | 7 | 9 | 13 | 14 | 14 | 14 | 14 | 13 | 14 | 14 | 15 | 15 | 15 | 15 | 14 | 15 | 13 | 14 |
| Fredrikstad | 14 | 5 | 6 | 11 | 11 | 13 | 13 | 14 | 15 | 15 | 15 | 15 | 14 | 15 | 15 | 15 | 15 | 15 | 15 | 15 | 15 | 13 | 13 | 14 | 14 | 14 | 15 | 14 | 15 | 15 |
| Stabæk | 11 | 15 | 16 | 16 | 16 | 16 | 16 | 16 | 16 | 16 | 16 | 16 | 16 | 16 | 16 | 16 | 16 | 16 | 16 | 16 | 16 | 16 | 16 | 16 | 16 | 16 | 16 | 16 | 16 | 16 |

Source: nifs.no
Notes: As of the last match in each round; delayed matches are not included.

== Relegation play-offs ==
At the end of the season, Stabæk and Fredrikstad were relegated directly to 1. divisjon, and will be replaced by Start and Sarpsborg who were directly promoted.

Five teams entered a play-off for the last Tippeligaen spot in the 2013 season. These were:

- A) Sandnes Ulf (by virtue of being the 14th placed team in the Tippeligaen)
- B) Sandefjord (by virtue of being the third placed team in the 1. divisjon)
- C) Mjøndalen (by virtue of being the fourth placed team in the 1. divisjon)
- D) Bodø/Glimt (by virtue of being the fifth placed team in the 1. divisjon)
- E) Ullensaker/Kisa (by virtue of being the sixth placed team in the 1. divisjon)

The four 1. divisjon teams first played a single game knockout tournament, with the winner (Ull/Kisa) advancing to a two-legged tie against the Tippeligaen team (Sandnes Ulf) for the 16th and final spot in the 2013 season. Sandnes Ulf retained their Tippeligaen spot with an aggregate 7–1 win over Ull/Kisa.

Results

21 November 2012
19:00 CET (UTC+1)

| Ullensaker/Kisa | 0–4 | Sandnes Ulf |
|---|---|---|
| | Report | Traustason 24'; Gytkjær 80'; Helle 85'; Holmvik 90' |

Jessheim Stadion, Jessheim
Attendance: 1,310
Referee: Tom Harald Hagen

24 November 2012
19:00 CET (UTC+1)

| Sandnes Ulf | 3–1 | Ullensaker/Kisa |
|---|---|---|
| Høiland 20'; Gytkjær 31' (pen.), 68' (pen.) | Report | Rosenkilde 18' |

Sandnes Stadion, Sandnes
Attendance: 2,633
Referee: Per Ivar Staberg

Sandnes Ulf won 7–1 on aggregate.

First round
3 | Sandefjord | 3
6 | Ullensaker/Kisa | 4
4 | Mjøndalen | 1
5 | Bodø/Glimt | 2

Second round
6 | Ullensaker/Kisa | 2
5 | Bodø/Glimt | 0

Final round
14 | Sandnes Ulf | 4
6 | Ullensaker/Kisa | 0

== Results ==
| Home \ Away | AAL | SKB | FFK | HAU | HØN | LSK | MFK | ODD | RBK | ULF | SIL | STB | SIF | TIL | VIF | VIK |
|---|---|---|---|---|---|---|---|---|---|---|---|---|---|---|---|---|
| Aalesund | — | 2–0 | 3–0 | 2–2 | 2–0 | 1–2 | 0–1 | 2–1 | 2–2 | 3–1 | 2–2 | 3–1 | 3–1 | 0–0 | 3–1 | 1–1 |
| Brann | 2–1 | — | 2–0 | 3–2 | 3–2 | 2–3 | 4–1 | 6–2 | 2–1 | 3–1 | 5–0 | 2–1 | 1–2 | 0–2 | 1–2 | 0–0 |
| Fredrikstad | 1–3 | 3–4 | — | 0–0 | 0–2 | 3–4 | 0–2 | 4–2 | 1–2 | 3–4 | 2–1 | 5–1 | 2–3 | 2–0 | 1–2 | 3–0 |
| Haugesund | 4–2 | 2–1 | 1–0 | — | 1–1 | 1–1 | 2–0 | 0–1 | 0–1 | 3–2 | 0–0 | 4–1 | 2–3 | 1–1 | 4–2 | 1–0 |
| Hønefoss BK | 3–1 | 2–1 | 1–1 | 3–2 | — | 0–0 | 1–1 | 1–4 | 1–4 | 1–1 | 0–0 | 0–0 | 1–1 | 0–1 | 1–0 | 2–2 |
| Lillestrøm | 0–0 | 3–4 | 1–2 | 0–0 | 2–2 | — | 1–1 | 1–1 | 2–2 | 1–3 | 1–0 | 6–0 | 0–1 | 4–2 | 1–1 | 0–0 |
| Molde | 2–1 | 2–1 | 2–0 | 1–0 | 1–0 | 3–2 | — | 3–1 | 2–0 | 3–2 | 2–1 | 4–3 | 2–1 | 3–2 | 2–0 | 1–2 |
| Odd Grenland | 3–0 | 1–0 | 1–1 | 2–1 | 4–0 | 2–0 | 0–0 | — | 0–1 | 2–2 | 0–4 | 1–2 | 2–1 | 2–2 | 2–3 | 1–4 |
| Rosenborg | 3–0 | 3–1 | 0–1 | 5–2 | 0–1 | 1–1 | 1–0 | 0–0 | — | 2–0 | 0–0 | 3–1 | 3–3 | 3–0 | 3–0 | 1–1 |
| Sandnes Ulf | 1–1 | 3–3 | 5–1 | 0–2 | 1–0 | 0–1 | 0–2 | 0–0 | 1–1 | — | 3–1 | 2–1 | 2–1 | 5–1 | 0–2 | 2–2 |
| Sogndal | 1–1 | 2–0 | 1–3 | 1–1 | 0–0 | 1–0 | 2–1 | 0–1 | 0–3 | 0–0 | — | 3–1 | 1–1 | 1–0 | 1–0 | 1–2 |
| Stabæk | 0–0 | 0–4 | 0–1 | 0–2 | 0–2 | 4–1 | 0–5 | 0–2 | 0–2 | 2–1 | 2–1 | — | 1–2 | 0–1 | 1–3 | 0–1 |
| Strømsgodset | 4–0 | 2–0 | 5–0 | 3–3 | 4–0 | 3–3 | 1–1 | 1–0 | 2–1 | 2–1 | 3–0 | 3–1 | — | 2–0 | 3–2 | 1–0 |
| Tromsø | 1–0 | 2–0 | 1–0 | 2–0 | 0–0 | 5–1 | 1–1 | 0–1 | 1–1 | 3–1 | 1–1 | 3–0 | 4–0 | — | 3–1 | 5–1 |
| Vålerenga | 0–0 | 1–1 | 3–2 | 2–1 | 3–2 | 1–2 | 1–2 | 3–1 | 0–0 | 4–0 | 0–2 | 1–2 | 1–1 | 1–0 | — | 1–0 |
| Viking | 1–1 | 2–1 | 3–0 | 0–2 | 2–1 | 1–2 | 1–0 | 1–0 | 1–4 | 5–0 | 2–1 | 1–0 | 3–2 | 0–1 | 2–1 | — |

Source: NIFS (in Norwegian)
Legend: Blue = home team win; Yellow = draw; Red = away team win.

== Season statistics ==
=== Top scorers ===
| Rank | Player | Club | Goals | Games | Average |
|---|---|---|---|---|---|
| 1 | (Hungary) Péter Kovács | Strømsgodset | 14 | 28 | 0.50 |
| 1 | (Czech Republic) Zdeněk Ondrášek | Tromsø | 14 | 29 | 0.48 |
| 3 | (Ivory Coast) Davy Claude Angan | Molde | 13 | 26 | 0.50 |
| 4 | (Serbia) Nikola Đurđić | Haugesund | 12 | 18 | 0.67 |
| 5 | (Sweden) Rade Prica | Rosenborg | 11 | 26 | 0.42 |
| 5 | (Nigeria) Kim Ojo | Brann | 11 | 29 | 0.38 |
| 5 | (Norway) Ola Kamara | Strømsgodset | 11 | 30 | 0.37 |
| 8 | (Finland) Riku Riski | Hønefoss | 10 | 26 | 0.38 |
| 8 | (Czech Republic) Bořek Dočkal | Rosenborg | 10 | 27 | 0.37 |
| 8 | (Norway) Ulrik Flo | Sogndal | 10 | 27 | 0.37 |
| 8 | (Norway) Torgeir Børven | Odd Grenland / Vålerenga | 10 | 29 | 0.34 |
| 8 | (Norway) Alexander Søderlund | Haugesund | 10 | 29 | 0.34 |

=== Discipline ===
==== Player ====
- Most yellow cards: 7
  - (Jamaica) Tremaine Stewart (Aalesund)
- Most red cards: 1
  - 23 players

==== Club ====
- Most yellow cards: 48
  - Lillestrøm
- Most red cards: 3
  - Fredrikstad
  - Sandnes Ulf
  - Vålerenga

=== Attendances ===
| Pos | Team | Total | High | Low | Average | Change |
|---|---|---|---|---|---|---|
| 1 | Rosenborg | 200,912 | 20,572 | 9,822 | 13,394 | −7.7% |
| 2 | Brann | 184,819 | 17,200 | 10,418 | 12,321 | −5.3% |
| 3 | Vålerenga | 161,526 | 16,687 | 8,711 | 10,768 | −19.2% |
| 4 | Viking | 148,403 | 13,443 | 7,541 | 9,894 | −3.5% |
| 5 | Molde | 140,432 | 11,112 | 8,503 | 9,362 | −4.6% |
| 6 | Aalesund | 137,748 | 10,247 | 8,324 | 9,183 | −4.0% |
| 7 | Fredrikstad | 106,649 | 9,215 | 5,432 | 7,110 | −22.0% |
| 8 | Strømsgodset | 91,508 | 7,451 | 4,726 | 6,101 | +6.9% |
| 9 | Lillestrøm | 85,389 | 10,239 | 4,376 | 5,693 | −4.0% |
| 10 | Odd Grenland | 77,668 | 6,713 | 4,433 | 5,178 | −9.4% |
| 11 | Haugesund | 67,985 | 5,000 | 3,854 | 4,532 | −0.4% |
| 12 | Tromsø | 62,856 | 5,299 | 3,644 | 4,190 | −13.9% |
| 13 | Stabæk | 58,551 | 5,508 | 3,066 | 3,903 | −47.3% |
| 14 | Sandnes Ulf | 57,615 | 4,969 | 2,875 | 3,841 | +153.2%^{1} |
| 15 | Sogndal | 54,883 | 5,207 | 2,736 | 3,659 | +15.0% |
| 16 | Hønefoss | 44,276 | 4,246 | 1,876 | 2,952 | +104.9%^{1} |
| | League total | 1,681,220 | 20,572 | 1,876 | 7,005 | −12.3% |

Source: nifs.no
Notes:
1: Team played last season in 1. divisjon.

== Awards ==
=== Annual awards ===
==== Goalkeeper of the Year ====
The Goalkeeper of the Year awarded to (Norway) Kenneth Udjus (Sogndal)

==== Defender of the Year ====
The Defender of the Year awarded to (Norway) Vegard Forren (Molde)

==== Midfielder of the Year ====
The Midfielder of the Year awarded to (Norway) Magnus Wolff Eikrem (Molde)

==== Striker of the Year ====
The Striker of the Year awarded to (Norway) Alexander Søderlund (Haugesund)

==== Coach of the Year ====
The Coach of the Year awarded to (Norway) Ole Gunnar Solskjær (Molde)
