= Cheikhou =

Cheikhou is a Senegalese masculine given name. Notable people with the name include:

- Cheikhou Dieng (born 1993), Senegalese footballer
- Cheikhou Kouyaté (born 1989), Senegalese footballer
