= Per Morten Haugen =

Norwegian association football player (born 1968)

Personal information
- Date of birth: 21 November 1968 (age 57)
- Position: Midfielder

Youth career
- Røros

Senior career*
Years	Team	Apps	(Gls)
–1985	Røros		
1986–1991	Moss		
1992–1995	Strindheim		
1995	→ Moss (loan)		
1996–1998	Moss		

International career
1984	Norway U15	6	(3)
1985	Norway U16	3	(0)
1986	Norway U17	3	(0)
1985	Norway U19	7	(1)
1987–1989	Norway U21	9	(0)

Managerial career
- 1999: Moss (youth)
- 2000–2001: Moss (assistant)
- 2006–2007: Fredrikstad (assistant)
- 2008: Fredrikstad (director of sports)
- 2009–2010: Moss (assistant)
- * Club domestic league appearances and goals

Per Morten Haugen (born 21 November 1968) is a Norwegian footballer who played as a midfielder. He played in the highest Norwegian league for Moss FK, winning the 1987 Norwegian First Division, and Strindheim IL. He later managed Moss as well.

== Career ==
Hailing from Røros Municipality, Haugen started his career in Røros IL. As he represented Norway as a youth international, he was given the Røros Award in 1985 for his football endeavours. He joined Nils Arne Eggen's Moss FK in the winter of 1986 and made his debut in a friendly match against Hamkam. Moss won promotion from the 1986 Norwegian Second Division and instantly won the 1987 Norwegian First Division.

Verdens Gang had tipped Moss in 10th place in 1987, with Haugen being "a talent worth noticing". Already in his first match of the season, Verdens Gang named Haugen as man of the match, and concluded that such debuts were few and far between. Haugen, still aged 18, "burst into full bloom", "overshadowed established First Division players" and seemed to have a "star-class debut" and a "comet career".

In 1988 he was partially used as a full back, but had good matches in midfield. He played in the latter role against Real Madrid in the first round of the 1988–89 European Cup. According to Verdens Gang, he was "clearly" the best Moss player, and the only one who was able to have possession of the ball. While in Spain, Haugen he had official transfer negotiatiations with Cádiz CF.

Haugen was injured at the end of 1989, and underwent ligament surgery in his right knee. After missing the 1990 pre-season, he was able to return and play in the spring of 1990. In the summer of 1990 he had surgery to his left knee, but after that he seemed to sustain from chronic inflammation. After the 1991 season, Haugen decided to move back to Trøndelag and join Strindheim IL.

In Strindheim, Haugen served as team captain and won promotion from the 1994 1. divisjon to the 1995 Eliteserien. However, ahead of the promotion, Haugen warned Strindheim of the reality of Eliteserien. The club, especially its administration, was not ready to play in the highest league. Haugen rejected an offer to rejoin Moss, as he wanted to contribute in the attempt to establish Strindheim in the Eliteserien. All in all, Strindheim had an abysmal 1995 season, though Verdens Gang named Haugen as man of the match in the home game against Bodø/Glimt, in which Strindheim secured one point. After playing 13 games for Strindheim in 1995 Eliteserien, where he continued to serve as team captain, Haugen returned to Moss despite the club only playing on the second tier. Moss reportedly paid 55,000 kr, initially for a loan towards the end of the season.

== Managerial career ==
In 1999 Haugen coached the boys' 1985 team in Moss FK. In 2000 Haugen started his managerial career as assistant manager in Moss under Knut Thorbjørn Eggen, the son of Haugen's first manager in Moss, Nils Arne Eggen. Haugen also served as acting manager for one game in 2001, which Moss won. After that, he moved to Spain, working as a PE teacher at the Norwegian school in Alfaz del Pi. In January 2006 he was hired as assistant manager of Fredrikstad FK, again under Knut Thorbjørn Eggen. In January 2007, he became interim co-manager with Tom Freddy Aune before Anders Grönhagen was hired as manager. Haugen then returned to his assistant role. Ahead of the 2008 season he became director of sports. He was replaced by Tor-Kristian Karlsen in the fall, but was promised a new "key assignment" within the club.

Ahead of the 2009 season, Moss tried to persuade Knut Thorbjørn Eggen to return as manager, but Eggen hesitated and recommended Haugen. Eggen would take on a role as head of player development. He was known for keeping a soft voice in training sessions.

== Personal life ==
He chose to settle in Moss with his family, having two children.

== Honours ==
- Norwegian league: 1987
- Norwegian second league: 1986, 1994
