= Trond Amundsen (football coach) =

Norwegian football coach

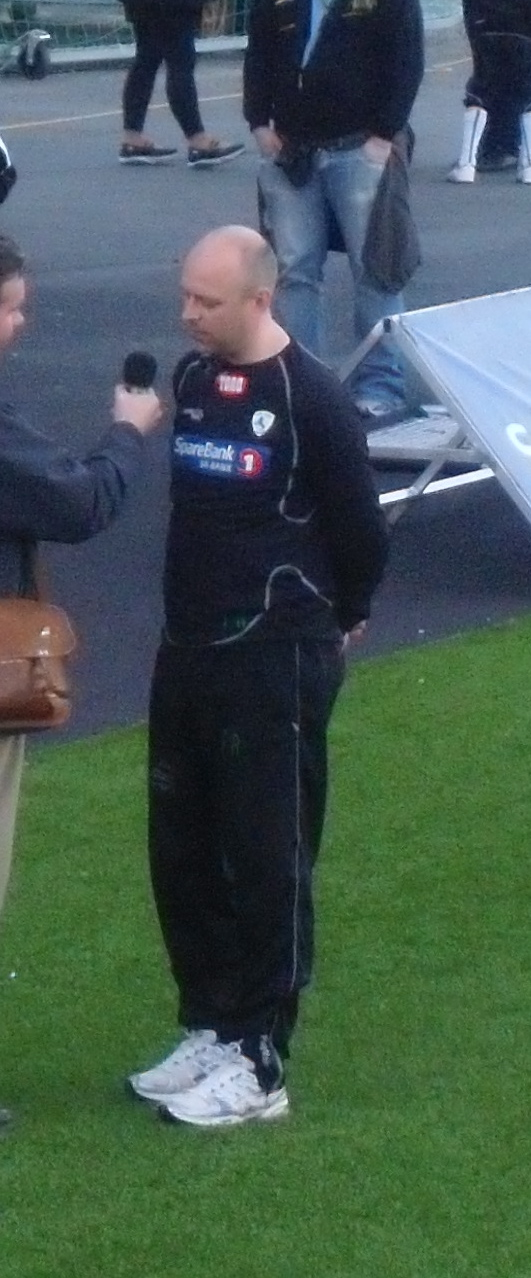
- Trond Amundsen in 2009

Personal information
- Full name: Trond Amundsen
- Date of birth: 30 March 1971 (age 55)

Team information
- Current team: Fredrikstad FK

Managerial career
- Years: Team
- 2007–2009: Løv-Ham
- 2010: Kongsvinger
- 2010–2012: Fredrikstad (assistant)
- 2012: Fredrikstad

Trond Amundsen (born 30 March 1971) is a Norwegian football coach. He became the head coach of Fredrikstad FK after the resignation of Tom Freddy Aune in 2012. Amundsen was head coach of Løv-Ham from 2007 to 2009, and had a short spell as head coach of Kongsvinger.

== Coaching career ==
Amundsen worked as coach at Santos FC's under-21 team, before he moved to the Norwegian club Kongsvinger where he became a part of the coaching team. In 2007, Amundsen became head coach of the second tier club Løv-Ham, and after two years at the club, he signed a contract for two more years. His work with the club linked him with the vacant job at Sandefjord, but he stayed on at Løv-Ham until he was appointed head coach of the newly promoted Tippeligaen club Kongsvinger ahead of the 2010-season.

On 12 April 2010, less than half a year after he signed for Kongsvinger, Amundsen resigned as head coach after three points in five matches, and cited disagreement with the management of the club on the way forward as reason for withdrawing from the club. One month later he joined Fredrikstad's coaching team.

When Fredrikstad's head coach Tom Freddy Aune resigned on 10 May 2012, Fredrikstad appointed Amundsen as head coach until the end of the season.
