= Vegard Forren =

Norwegian footballer (born 1988)

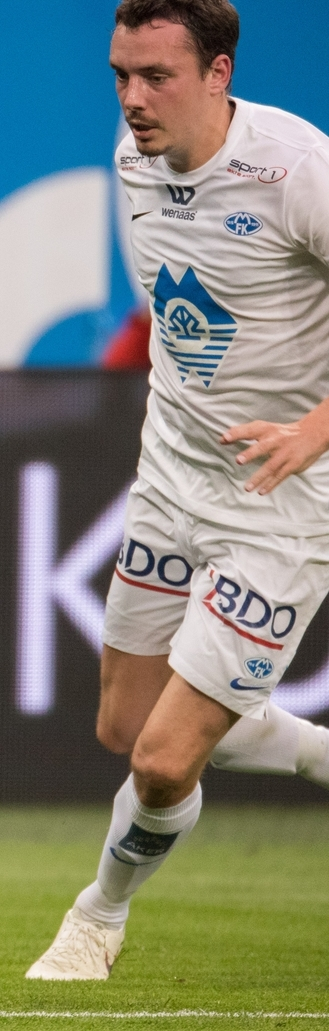
- Forren in 2018 with Molde

Personal information
- Full name: Vegard Valgermo Forren
- Date of birth: 16 February 1988 (age 38)
- Place of birth: Kyrksæterøra, Norway
- Height: 1.86 m (6 ft 1 in)
- Position: Centre-back

Team information
- Current team: Træff
- Number: 6

Youth career
- KIL/Hemne

Senior career*
Years	Team	Apps	(Gls)
2007–2013	Molde	146	(5)
2013	Southampton	0	(0)
2013–2017	Molde	92	(5)
2017	Brighton & Hove Albion	0	(0)
2017–2020	Molde	55	(1)
2020–2021	Brann	36	(0)
2021	Eide og Omegn	5	(0)
2022–2023	Træff	22	(2)
2023	KÍ Klaksvík	17	(1)
2024–	Træff	71	(3)

International career
2008–2010	Norway U21	14	(3)
2011–2012	Norway U23	2	(0)
2012–2017	Norway	33	(1)

Managerial career
- 2024–: Træff (player-assistant)
Medal record
Molde
Winner	Tippeligaen	2011
Winner	Tippeligaen	2012
Winner	Norwegian Football Cup	2013
Winner	Tippeligaen	2014
Winner	Norwegian Football Cup	2014
Winner	Eliteserien	2019
Klaksvík
Winner	Faroe Islands Premier League	2023
- * Club domestic league appearances and goals as of 15 November 2026

Vegard Valgermo Forren (born 16 February 1988) is a Norwegian professional footballer who plays as a centre-back for Træff. He was capped over 30 times for the Norway national team.

Born in Kyrksæterøra, Forren was originally a youth player at local club KIL/Hemne, before starting his professional career with Molde in 2007. After making over 150 appearances for Molde, he joined Southampton in January 2013 for a fee in the region of £4 million, but ended up not playing a single game. He returned to Molde in July 2013 for an undisclosed fee. As of 1 December 2019, Forren has made 384 appearances for Molde, the second-highest number of appearances by any player for the club. Alongside Trond Strande and Mattias Moström, he is the only player to have appearances for Molde in 12 consecutive Eliteserien seasons.

== Club career ==
=== Molde ===
Forren was first discovered by Molde FK when they met KIL/Hemne in the first round of the Norwegian Football Cup. KIL/Hemne surprisingly won the match 3–1, with Forren and two other young players impressing highly. They were afterwards invited to trial for Molde in a junior tournament. Shortly after Forren signed a five-year deal with Molde. On 26 August 2007, Forren made his Molde debut as a 59th-minute substitute in the club's 12–1 win against Mandalskameratene. He got seven league games in the 2007 season and helped the team promote to the 2008 Tippeligaen. He took the Tippeligaen by storm and European clubs as A.C. Milan, Newcastle, Liverpool and Hoffenheim, have watched him playing for Molde. But Forren stated that he wanted to stay in Molde for a while, even though his dream was to eventually play in a bigger European league. He said that he was still young and had a long career in front of him. He was also linked with Lazio and F.C. Copenhagen.

After winning the Tippeligaen with Molde in 2011, Molde rejected two offers from Club Brugge in December 2011. Forren then won the Norwegian league with Molde in 2012 for the second time in a row and VG and Aftenposten, along with broadcaster TV2, named Forren as the top defender in the Tippeligaen.

=== Southampton ===
On 18 January 2013, Forren signed for Premier League side Southampton on a three-and-a-half-year deal for an undisclosed fee. His first game was for the club's under-21 side on 4 March against Liverpool, when he scored the opening goal for the Saints in the 30th minute with a volley. During his six months at the club, Forren did not make an appearance for the Southampton first team.

=== Return to Molde ===
Rumoured to make a return move back to Molde, Forren insisted he wanted to stay at Southampton to fight for his place. However, on 11 July 2013, he left Southampton to return to Molde for an undisclosed fee. Molde won the 2013 Norwegian Cup after rivals Rosenborg was defeated 4–2 in the final. Forren assisted Jo Inge Berget on Molde's 2–2 equalizing goal in the game. He left the club on 1 January 2017, when his contract expired.

=== Brighton & Hove Albion ===
Forren signed for Championship side Brighton & Hove Albion on 7 March 2017 until the end of the 2016–17 season. He did not make a single appearance at the club and was released at the end of the season.

=== Second return to Molde ===
Forren re-signed for Molde FK on 27 July 2017. On 12 December 2017, he signed a new two-year contract with Molde. On 25 March 2019, Forren extended his contract to the end of the 2021 season. On 28 May 2020, Molde announced that Forren would leave the club by mutual agreement on 31 May 2020, after Forren stole money gathered from players fines to cover gambling debts.

=== Restart at Brann ===
On 9 June 2020, Forren signed a one-year contract with SK Brann. On 13 August 2021, the club and player agreed to terminate the contract following an unsanctioned late-night party at the club's stadium two days prior, where 12 players and 7 women were in attendance. On 26 August 2021, he was formally charged with raping a woman at the party. He denied the charges and the case was dropped on account of insufficient evidence on 20 October 2021.

=== KÍ ===
On 11 January 2023, Klaksvíkar Ítróttarfelag of the Faroe Islands Premier League announced the signing of Forren to a one-year contract.

== International career ==
Forren made his debut for Norway U21 in the match against Ukraine U21 on 26 March 2008. He played a total of 14 matches for the under-21 team, scoring three goals, and was later capped twice for the under-23 team.

Forren made his debut for Norway in the 2012 King's Cup match against Thailand on 18 January 2012. He also played against South Korea a few days later, but had to wait to October 2012 for his first competitive match when he started the match against Switzerland, and played five consecutive matches alongside Brede Hangeland in Norway's central defence, until he was left out of the Norwegian squad for the match against Albania in June 2013 due to lack of playing time in Southampton.

== Career statistics ==
=== Club ===
As of match played 15 November 2026

Appearances and goals by club, season and competition
Club	Season	League			National cup		League cup		Europe		Other		Total	
Club	Season	Division	Apps	Goals	Apps	Goals	Apps	Goals	Apps	Goals	Apps	Goals	Apps	Goals
Molde	2007	1. divisjon	7	0	1	0	—		—		—		8	0
Molde	2008	Tippeligaen	25	0	5	1	—		—		—		30	1
Molde	2009	Tippeligaen	27	3	7	1	—		—		—		34	4
Molde	2010	Tippeligaen	28	0	3	0	—		4 (Note: Appearances in UEFA Europa League)	0	—		35	0
Molde	2011	Tippeligaen	29	1	2	0	—		—		—		31	1
Molde	2012	Tippeligaen	30	1	3	0	—		10 (Note: Three appearances in Champions League qualifying rounds and seven appearances in Europa League, including play-offs)	1	—		43	2
Molde	Total		146	5	21	2	—	—	14	1	—	—	181	8
Southampton	2012–13	Premier League	0	0	0	0	0	0	—		—		0	0
Molde	2013	Tippeligaen	14	0	2	0	—		6 (Note: Four appearances in Champions League qualifying rounds and two appearances in Europa League play-offs)	0	—		22	0
Molde	2014	Tippeligaen	28	4	6	0	—		4	2	—		38	6
Molde	2015	Tippeligaen	27	1	3	0	—		11 (Note: Four appearances in Champions League qualifying rounds and seven appearances in Europa League, including play-offs)	1	—		42	2
Molde	2016	Tippeligaen	23	0	1	0	—		2	0	—		24	0
Molde	Total		92	5	12	0	—	—	23	3	—	—	127	8
Brighton & Hove Albion	2016–17	EFL Championship	0	0	0	0	0	0	—		—		0	0
Molde	2017	Eliteserien	10	0	2	0	—		—		—		12	0
Molde	2018	Eliteserien	26	1	1	0	—		8	0	—		35	1
Molde	2019	Eliteserien	18	0	3	0	—		7	1	0	0	28	1
Molde	Total		55	1	6	0	—	—	15	1	—	—	76	2
Brann	2020	Eliteserien	25	0	—		—		—		—		25	0
Brann	2021	Eliteserien	11	0	0	0	—		—		—		11	0
Brann	Total		36	0	0	0	—	—	0	0	—	—	36	0
Træff	2022	PostNord-ligaen	22	2	1	0	—		—		—		23	2
Træff	Total		22	2	1	0	—	—	0	0	—	—	23	2
KÍ Klaksvik	2023	Faroe Islands Premier League	17	1	2	0	—		14	0	—		33	1
KÍ Klaksvik	Total		17	1	2	0	—	—	14	0	—	—	33	1
Træff	2024	Norsk Tipping-ligaen	26	2	2	0	—		—		—		28	2
Træff	2025	PostNord-ligaen	23	0	2	0	—		—		—		25	0
Træff	2026	PostNord-ligaen	22	1	1	0	—		—		—		23	1
Træff	Total		71	3	5	0	—	—	0	0	—	—	76	3
Career total			439	17	46	2	—	—	66	5	—	—	551	24

=== International ===
As of match played 11 November 2016

Appearances and goals by national team and year
National team	Year	Apps	Goals
Norway	2012	5	0
Norway	2013	5	0
Norway	2014	10	0
Norway	2015	9	1
Norway	2016	4	0
Total		33	1

== Honours ==
Molde

- Tippeligaen/Eliteserien: 2011, 2012, 2014, 2019
- Norwegian Cup: 2013, 2014

Individual

- Tippeligaen Defender of the Year: 2012
