= Cheikhou Dieng =

Senegalese footballer (born 1993)

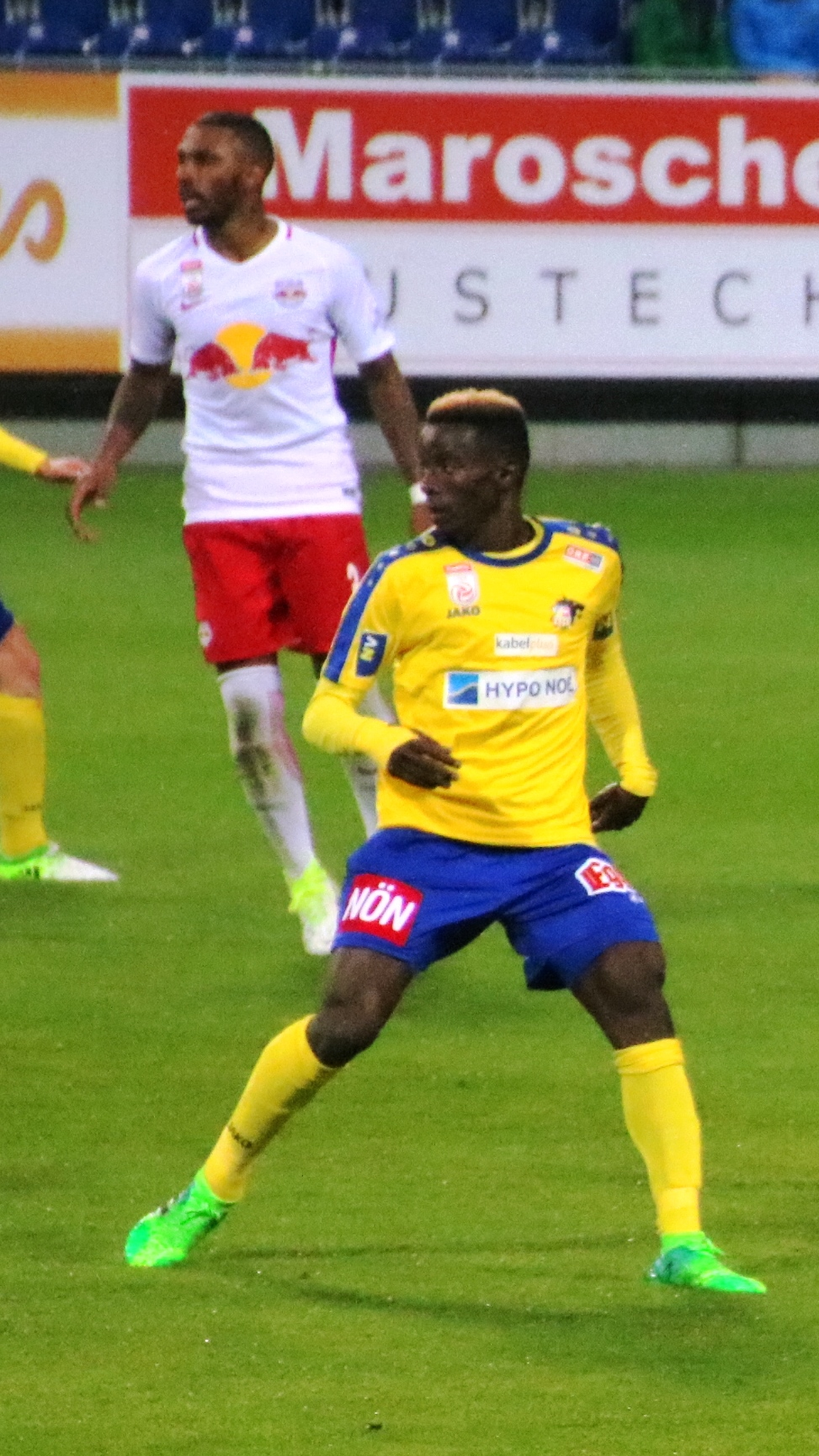
- Dieng with SKN St. Pölten in 2017

Personal information
- Date of birth: 23 November 1993 (age 32)
- Place of birth: Pikine, Senegal
- Height: 1.80 m (5 ft 11 in)
- Position: Forward

Senior career*
Years	Team	Apps	(Gls)
–2012	Ndar Guedj		
2012–2016	Sandefjord	103	(12)
2016	SKN St. Pölten	17	(6)
2016–2019	İstanbul Başakşehir	1	(0)
2017	→ SKN St. Pölten (loan)	13	(1)
2017	→ MKE Ankaragücü (loan)	7	(0)
2018	→ Spartak Subotica (loan)	8	(0)
2018–2019	→ Wacker Innsbruck (loan)	26	(4)
2020–2022	Wolfsberger AC	52	(7)
2022–2023	Zagłębie Lubin	17	(0)
2022–2023	Zagłębie Lubin II	18	(5)
2024	DSV Leoben	14	(3)
2024	Panevėžys	19	(1)

International career
2015	Senegal U23	6	(1)
- * Club domestic league appearances and goals as of 18 February 2025

Cheikhou Dieng (born 23 November 1993) is a Senegalese professional footballer who plays as a forward.

== Club career ==
=== Sandefjord ===
Dieng began his career at Ndar Guedj in Senegal. For the 2012 season he moved to Norwegian First Division club Sandefjord. He made his league debut in April 2012, when he came on as a substitute for Martin Torp in the 84th minute on the fourth matchday of that season against Strømmen IF. In August 2012, he scored his first goal in Norway's second tier in a 3–0 win over Tromsdalen UIL. In the 2012 season, he came to a total of 23 second division appearances, in which he scored four goals. The following season, he scored three goals in 26 games. In the 2014 season, he won the second-tier title with Sandefjord and thus won promotion to Tippeligaen. In the promotion season he scored two goals in 26 appearances.

After promotion, Dieng made his Tippeligaen debut in April 2015 against Bodø/Glimt, recording an assist to compatriot Jean Alassane Mendy in a 3–1 win. In the same month, he scored his first goal in Tippeligaen in a 2–1 defeat against Viking. By the end of the season, he had made 27 appearances, scoring three goals. Sandefjord, however, was relegated to the second tier as bottom of the table after one season.

=== SKN St. Pölten ===
Dieng then moved to Austria in January 2016 to second division club SKN St. Pölten, signing a contract until June 2018. For SKN he made 17 appearances in the second division until the end of the season, scoring six goals. As second division champion, he won promotion to the Austrian Football Bundesliga with St. Pölten at the end of the season.

=== İstanbul Başakşehir ===
After promotion, Dieng moved to Turkey for the 2016–17 season to İstanbul Başakşehir, where he signed a three-year contract. In Istanbul, however, he had a difficult time and, also due to injury, he only made 1 appearance in the Süper Lig in his first half year. Therefore, he returned to St. Pölten on loan in January 2017. For the relegation-threatened Lower Austrians he made 13 Bundesliga appearances and scored 1 goal, as he helped the club avoid relegation at the end of the season. After the end of the loan, he first returned to Başakşehir.

In August 2017, he was loaned to TFF First League club MKE Ankaragücü. In the Ankara-based club, however, he could not assert himself as a starter, and the loan was terminated prematurely in January 2018 after eight appearances in the second tier. In February 2018 he joined Serbian SuperLiga club Spartak Subotica on loan. Also in Subotica he did not get beyond the role of substitute, and he finished the season with 8 appearances in the SuperLiga, where he only made a start twice.

In August 2018, he returned to Austria and joined Bundesliga club Wacker Innsbruck on loan. For the Tyroleans, he featured as a winger and appeared in 26 Bundesliga games in the 2018–19 season, scoring 4 goals. With Wacker, however, he suffered relegation from the Bundesliga at the end of the season. After the end of the loan, his contract with İstanbul Başakşehir was not renewed, and so he left the club after four loans.

=== Wolfsberger AC ===
After half a year without a club, Dieng moved to Wolfsberger AC from the Austrian Football Bundesliga in January 2020, where he received a contract running until June 2020. For the Carinthians he made 12 appearances in the 2019–20 Bundesliga season in which he scored once. With the club he also qualified for the UEFA Europa League after finishing third in the league table. His expiring contract with Wolfsberger AC was extended in July 2020 until June 2022.

=== Zagłebie Lubin ===
On 28 February 2022, Dieng joined Polish Ekstraklasa side Zagłębie Lubin, signing a two-and-a-half-year contract. On 20 July 2023, having spent the first half of the year with Zagłębie's reserve side, Dieng left the club by mutual consent.

=== DSV Leoben ===
On 12 January 2024, Dieng returned to Austria and signed with DSV Leoben.

=== FK Panevėžys ===
In June 2024, Dieng signed with Lithuanian club Panevėžys. He made his A Lyga debut in a 2–0 victory against DFK Dainava.

== International career ==
Dieng played for the Senegal U23 national team. He played at the 2015 U-23 Africa Cup of Nations, held in Senegal.

He also played with Senegal U23 at the 2015 African Games where they won the gold.

== Career statistics ==
As of match played 9 November 2024

Appearances and goals by club, season and competition
Club	Season	League			National cup (Note: Includes Norwegian Cup, Austrian Cup, Turkish Cup, Polish Cup)		Europe		Other		Total	
Club	Season	Division	Apps	Goals	Apps	Goals	Apps	Goals	Apps	Goals	Apps	Goals
Sandefjord	2012	1. divisjon	24	4	5	1	—		1 (Note: Appearance in Norwegian First Division promotion play-offs)	0	30	5
Sandefjord	2013	1. divisjon	26	3	3	0	—		—		29	3
Sandefjord	2014	1. divisjon	26	2	1	0	—		—		27	2
Sandefjord	2015	Tippeligaen	27	3	5	0	—		—		30	3
Sandefjord	Total		103	12	14	1	—		1	0	119	13
SKN St. Pölten	2015–16	Erste Liga	17	6	2	0	—		—		19	6
İstanbul Başakşehir	2016–17	Süper Lig	1	0	4	1	1 (Note: Appearance(s) in UEFA Europa League)	0	—		6	1
SKN St. Pölten (loan)	2016–17	Austrian Bundesliga	13	1	1	0	—		—		14	1
MKE Ankaragücü (loan)	2017–18	TFF First League	7	0	1	0	—		—		8	0
Spartak Subotica (loan)	2017–18	Serbian SuperLiga	8	0	0	0	—		—		8	0
Wacker Innsbruck (loan)	2018–19	Austrian Bundesliga	26	4	2	0	—		—		28	4
Wolfsberger AC	2019–20	Austrian Bundesliga	12	1	0	0	—		—		12	1
Wolfsberger AC	2020–21	Austrian Bundesliga	23	3	4	2	5	0	—		32	5
Wolfsberger AC	2021–22	Austrian Bundesliga	17	3	3	1	—		—		20	4
Wolfsberger AC	Total		52	7	7	3	5	0	—		64	10
Zagłębie Lubin	2021–22	Ekstraklasa	11	0	—		—		—		11	0
Zagłębie Lubin	2022–23	Ekstraklasa	6	0	1	0	—		—		7	0
Zagłębie Lubin	Total		17	0	1	0	—		—		18	0
Zagłębie Lubin II	2022–23	II liga	18	5	0	0	—		—		18	5
DSV Leoben	2023–24	2. Liga	14	3	2	0	—		—		16	3
Panevėžys	2024	A Lyga	19	1	0	0	7 (Note: Three appearances in UEFA Champions League, two appearances in UEFA Europa League, two appearances in UEFA Conference League)	0	—		26	1
Career total			295	33	34	5	13	0	1	0	343	38

== Honours ==
Sandefjord

- 1. divisjon: 2014

SKN St. Pölten

- Austrian Football First League: 2015–16
