= Alexander Gabrielsen =

Norwegian footballer (born 1985)

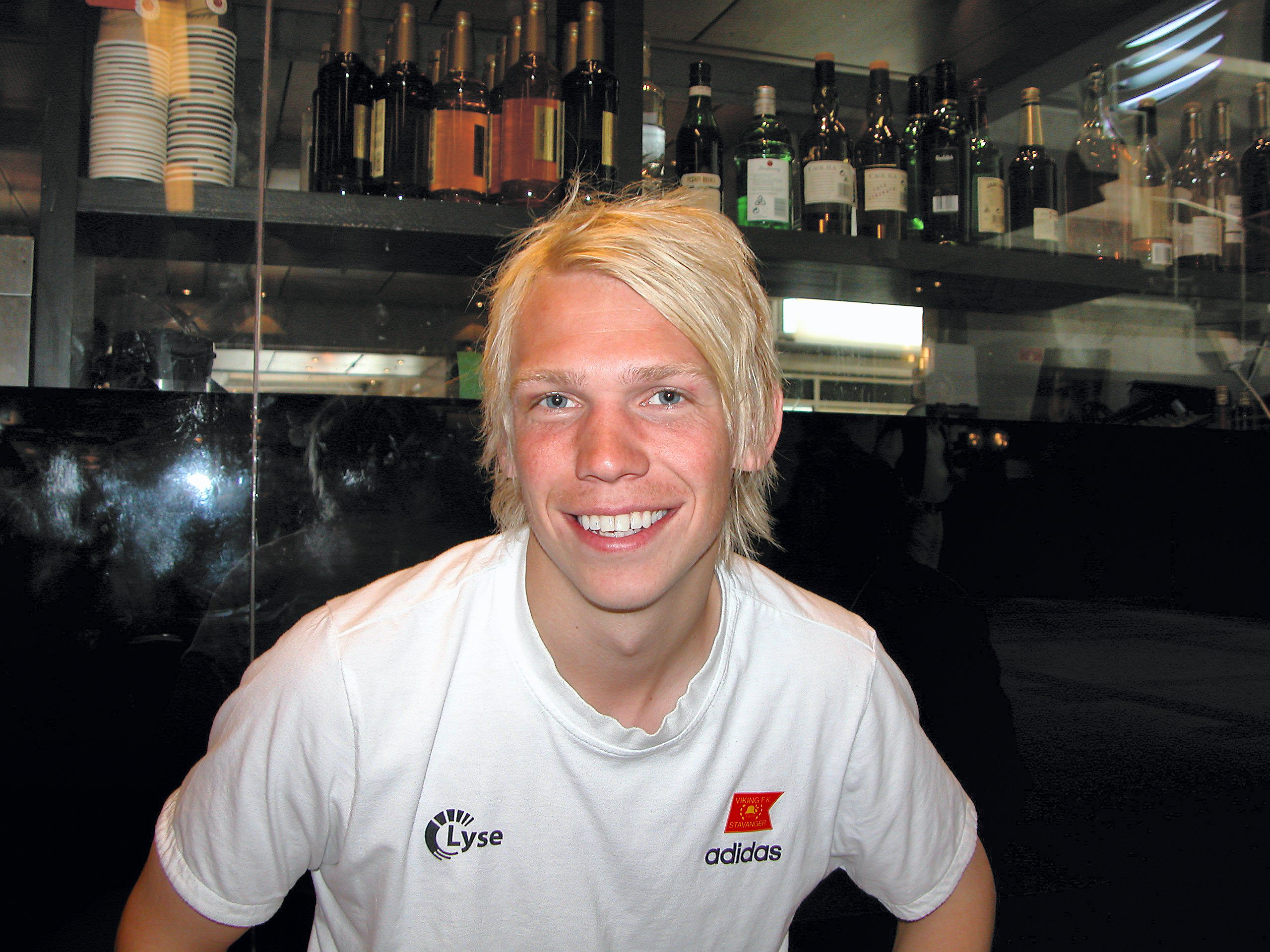
- Gabrielsen in 2006

Personal information
- Date of birth: 18 November 1985 (age 40)
- Place of birth: Stavanger, Norway
- Height: 1.84 m (6 ft 0 in)
- Position: Defender

Youth career
- –2002: Randaberg

Senior career*
Years	Team	Apps	(Gls)
2002–2007	Viking	11	(0)
2007–2017	Sandefjord	164	(12)
Total		175	(12)

International career
–2006	Norway U21	11	(0)
- * Club domestic league appearances and goals

Alexander Gabrielsen (born 18 November 1985) is a Norwegian former professional footballer who played as a defender.

== Career ==
In 2002, Gabrielsen signed for Viking FK from Randaberg IL, for which he had been playing since he was a boy. He got his Tippeliga-debut in 2003. He played 11 Tippeliga-matches for Viking until 10 August 2007, when he signed a 3.5-year-deal with Sandefjord Fotball. He also represented his country at the U21 level, playing for the Norway U21 team 11 matches, all of them in 2006. In October 2017, Gabrielsen announced his retirement from playing.

== Career statistics ==
Appearances and goals by club, season and competition
Club	Season	League			Cup		Europe		Total	
Club	Season	Division	Apps	Goals	Apps	Goals	Apps	Goals	Apps	Goals
Viking	2003	Tippeligaen	3	0	1	1	0	0	4	1
Viking	2004	Tippeligaen	8	0	1	0	0	0	9	0
Viking	2005	Tippeligaen	0	0	2	0	1	0	3	0
Viking	2006	Tippeligaen	0	0	1	0	0	0	1	0
Viking	Total		11	0	5	1	1	0	17	1
Sandefjord	2007	Tippeligaen	6	0	0	0	0	0	6	0
Sandefjord	2008	Adeccoligaen	23	1	2	1	0	0	27	2
Sandefjord	2009	Tippeligaen	22	0	2	0	0	0	24	0
Sandefjord	2010	Tippeligaen	23	1	4	0	0	0	27	1
Sandefjord	2011	Adeccoligaen	27	3	2	1	0	0	29	4
Sandefjord	2012	Adeccoligaen	9	1	1	1	0	0	10	2
Sandefjord	2013	Adeccoligaen	14	2	0	0	0	0	14	2
Sandefjord	2014	Norwegian First Division	19	2	0	0	0	0	19	2
Sandefjord	2015	Tippeligaen	11	2	2	0	0	0	13	2
Sandefjord	2016	OBOS-ligaen	5	0	0	0	0	0	5	0
Sandefjord	2017	Eliteserien	5	0	1	0	0	0	6	0
Sandefjord	Total		164	12	14	3	0	0	178	15
Career total			175	12	19	4	1	0	195	16
