= Martin Torp =

Norwegian footballer (born 1992)

Personal information
- Full name: Sverre Martin Torp
- Date of birth: 3 March 1992 (age 34)
- Place of birth: Norway
- Position: Midfielder

Team information
- Current team: Larvik Turn
- Number: 25

Youth career
- –2008: Larvik Turn
- 2009: Sandefjord

Senior career*
Years	Team	Apps	(Gls)
2010–2016	Sandefjord	87	(12)
2016	→ Ull/Kisa (loan)	13	(2)
2017–2021	Ull/Kisa	128	(13)
2022–2023	Arendal	44	(3)
2024–2025	Eik Tønsberg	23	(4)
2026–	Larvik Turn	4	(0)

International career
2010	Norway U19	1	(0)
- * Club domestic league appearances and goals as of 10 May 2026

Sverre Martin Torp (born 3 March 1992) is a Norwegian footballer who plays as a midfielder for Larvik Turn.

== Club career ==
Hailing from Larvik, Torp where playing for Larvik Turn's first team in the Third Division until he was signed by Sandefjord Fotball's youth squad ahead of the 2009-season. In May 2010, he was taken up into Sandefjords first team squad, and during the 2010-season Torp played 13 matches in Tippeligaen.

== International career ==
In August 2010, Torp was called up to replace Krister Wemberg in Norway U-19's squad for the friendlies against Denmark U-19. Torp got one cap for Norway U-19.

== Career statistics ==
As of 18 October 2020

Club	Season	Division	League		Cup		Total	
Club	Season	Division	Apps	Goals	Apps	Goals	Apps	Goals
2010	Sandefjord	Eliteserien	13	0	4	0	17	0
2011	Sandefjord	1. divisjon	10	2	0	0	10	2
2012	Sandefjord	1. divisjon	28	3	4	0	32	3
2013	Sandefjord	1. divisjon	19	6	2	1	21	7
2014	Sandefjord	1. divisjon	6	1	0	0	6	1
2015	Sandefjord	Eliteserien	9	0	3	0	12	0
2016	Sandefjord	1. divisjon	2	0	0	0	2	0
2016	Ull/Kisa	1. divisjon	13	2	0	0	13	2
2017	Ull/Kisa	1. divisjon	19	1	0	0	19	1
2018	Ull/Kisa	1. divisjon	30	2	2	0	32	2
2019	Ull/Kisa	1. divisjon	29	4	2	1	31	5
2020	Ull/Kisa	1. divisjon	19	3	–		19	3
Career Total			197	24	17	2	214	26
