= Tom Freddy Aune =

Norwegian footballer (born 1970)

Personal information
- Full name: Tom Freddy Aune
- Date of birth: 3 June 1970 (age 56)
- Place of birth: Oslo, Norway
- Position: Forward

Youth career
- –1989: Lisleby

Senior career*
Years	Team	Apps	(Gls)
1990–1993	Fredrikstad	85	(25)
1994–1995	Sogndal	31	(2)
1995–1998	Fredrikstad	47	(14)
1999–2000	Sarpsborg		

Managerial career
- 2003: Lisleby
- 2004: Kvik Halden
- 2010–2012: Fredrikstad
- * Club domestic league appearances and goals

Tom Freddy Aune (born 3 June 1970) is a Norwegian former football forward and coach. He was most recently the head coach of Fredrikstad.

As a player, Aune played for Fredrikstad at the second and third tier from 1990 to 1999 only interrupted by two seasons at Sogndal, where he got 19 appearances in Tippeligaen in 1994.

== Early life ==
Aune was born in Oslo. As a kid he played two years for Enebakk. His family then moved to Lisleby in Fredrikstad, and he started playing for Lisleby FK.

== Playing career ==
Aune made his debut for Lisleby's first team in 1988, and the next season he scored 22 goals for the club, which were playing at the fourth tier.

Ahead of the 1990 season, he transferred to Fredrikstad FK. The club was then playing at the second tier, and Aune was a regular starter for the team. In 1991, he scored nine goals, and was the team's second top goalscorer, only beaten by Stian Solberg, who scored ten goals. In 1992 Fredrikstad was relegated to the third tier for the first time in the club's history. A lot of players left the club, but Aune stayed for one more year. Fredrikstad finished second in the 1993 Second Division, and Aune was the team's top goalscorer with ten goals.

Aune then moved to Sogndal, and played 19 matches in Tippeligaen in 1994, when the team was relegated. He played for Sogndal until August 1995, when he moved back to his home-town team Fredrikstad. He played four more years for Fredrikstad, before he moved to the local rivals Sarpsborg, where he spent two seasons before he retired.

== Coaching career ==
After his retirement, Aune worked several years as a teacher in high school. He was hired as a youth coach in Fredrikstad in 2002, but after one year he quit the job because FFK wanted Aune to work full-time as youth coach while Aune wanted to still be a teacher. After one year as head coach in his youth-club Lisleby and one year as head coach in Kvik Halden, Aune was again hired as youth-coach in Fredrikstad in October 2004. When Anders Grönhagen was signed as head coach of Fredrikstad, Per Morten Haugen and Aune became assistant coaches. Aune quit his job as a teacher in 2008 and during the 2009-season he stepped in temporarily as head coach when Grönhagen was on a sick leave. Ahead of the 2010-season Aune was appointed as the new head coach of Fredrikstad. During his first season, the club won promotion to Tippeligaen after beating Hønefoss in the promotion-playoff.
