= Kevin Larsen =

Norwegian footballer (born 1986)

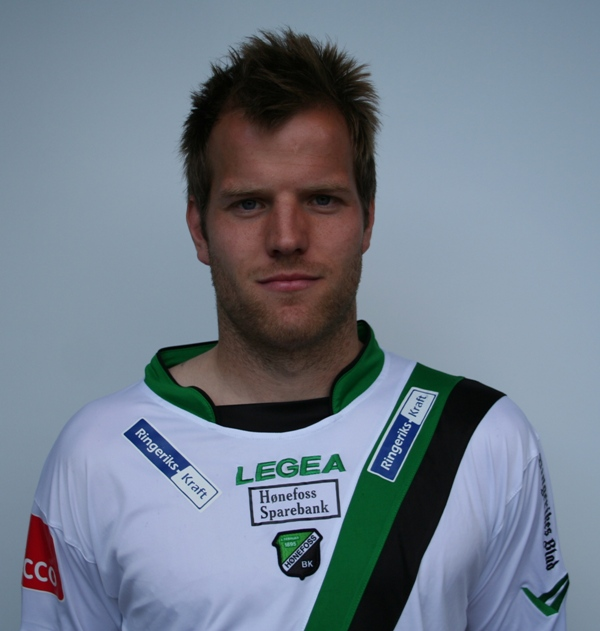

Personal information
- Date of birth: 10 May 1986 (age 40)
- Place of birth: Sandefjord, Norway
- Height: 1.85 m (6 ft 1 in)
- Position: Defender

Youth career
- Store Bergan
- Runar
- Lyn

Senior career*
Years	Team	Apps	(Gls)
2005–2007	Lyn	45	(7)
2008–2010	Tromsø	42	(3)
2011–2013	Hønefoss	80	(5)
2014–2016	Sandefjord	61	(4)

International career
2004	Norway U18	5	(0)
2005	Norway U19	7	(2)
2006–2008	Norway U21	15	(2)
- * Club domestic league appearances and goals

Kevin Larsen (born 10 May 1986) is a Norwegian footballer who plays left back for Sandefjord. He also has matches for the Norway national under-21 football team.

He previously played for Store Bergan and Runar in his home town Sandefjord, before making his Tippeligaen debut for Lyn in 2005. On 10 April 2005, he made his debut against Fredrikstad, where he scored Lyn's only goal in a 1–1 draw.

On 25 October 2007, Larsen signed a three-year contract with Tromsø.

On 18 February 2011, Larsen signed a three-year contract with Hønefoss.

== Career statistics ==
As of 4 November 2016

Season	Club	Division	League		Cup		Total	
Season	Club	Division	Apps	Goals	Apps	Goals	Apps	Goals
2005	Lyn	Tippeligaen	20	5	2	0	22	5
2006	Lyn	Tippeligaen	16	1	2	1	18	2
2007	Lyn	Tippeligaen	9	1	3	0	12	1
2008	Tromsø	Tippeligaen	22	2	3	1	25	3
2009	Tromsø	Tippeligaen	17	1	5	1	22	2
2010	Tromsø	Tippeligaen	3	0	0	0	3	0
2011	Hønefoss	1. divisjon	27	2	3	1	30	3
2012	Hønefoss	Tippeligaen	26	2	2	0	28	2
2013	Hønefoss	Tippeligaen	27	1	2	1	29	2
2014	Sandefjord	1. divisjon	19	3	1	0	20	3
2015	Sandefjord	Tippeligaen	18	0	4	1	22	1
2016	Sandefjord	1. divisjon	24	1	5	1	29	2
Career Total			228	19	32	7	260	26
