= Mads Pedersen (footballer, born 1993) =

Danish footballer

Personal information
- Full name: Mads Pedersen
- Date of birth: 17 January 1993 (age 33)
- Place of birth: Nakskov, Denmark
- Height: 1.79 m (5 ft 10 1/2 in)
- Position: Midfielder

Senior career*
Years	Team	Apps	(Gls)
2011–2014	FC Midtjylland	7	(0)
2013	→ Skive IK (loan)	9	(0)
2013–2014	→ Lyngby BK (loan)	24	(1)
2014–2016	Sandefjord	23	(1)
- * Club domestic league appearances and goals as of 6 January 2016

Mads Pedersen (born 17 January 1993) is a Danish footballer who last played for Sandefjord. He is in the team since 2011 and plays as a central midfielder.
