= 2018 Sandefjord Fotball season =

Sandefjord
2018 season
- Chairman: Roger Gulliksen
- Manager: Magnus Powell (Until 25 April); Geir Ludvig Fevang (Caretaker from 25 April until 31 May); Martí Cifuentes (from 31 May)
- Stadium: Komplett Arena
- Eliteserien: 16th (relegated)
- Norwegian Cup: Second Round vs Skeid
- Top goalscorer: League: Pontus Engblom (3); All: Two Players (4)
Home colours	Away colours	Third colours

The 2018 season is Sandefjord's second season in a row in the Eliteserien following their promotion in 2016.

== Squad ==
As of 29 August 2018

Note: Flags indicate national team as defined under FIFA eligibility rules; some limited exceptions apply. Players may hold more than one non-FIFA nationality.

No.	Pos.	Nation	Player
1	GK	NOR	Jacob Storevik
2	DF	NOR	Lars Grorud (vice-captain)
3	DF	NOR	Sander Moen Foss
4	DF	NOR	Christer Reppesgård Hansen
5	MF	ESP	Enric Vallès (3rd captain)
6	FW	NOR	Mohamed Ofkir
7	MF	ISL	Emil Pálsson
8	MF	NOR	Erik Mjelde
9	MF	NOR	Håvard Storbæk (captain)
10	FW	ESP	Pau Morer
11	FW	NOR	Fitim Azemi (on loan from Vålerenga)
12	GK	NOR	Eirik Holmen Johansen

No.	Pos.	Nation	Player
13	DF	NOR	Marius Høibråten
14	FW	ESP	Rufo
15	FW	SWE	Pontus Engblom
16	DF	SEN	El-Hadji Gana Kane
17	DF	AND	Marc Vales
18	MF	SWE	William Kurtovic
19	DF	SEN	Victor Demba Bindia
21	DF	NOR	Stian Ringstad (on loan from Strømsgodset)
22	MF	NOR	Mohammed Fellah
23	MF	NOR	Ole Breistøl
37	GK	NOR	Jesper Granlund
46	FW	NOR	George Gibson

=== Players out on loan ===
Note: Flags indicate national team as defined under FIFA eligibility rules; some limited exceptions apply. Players may hold more than one non-FIFA nationality.

No.	Pos.	Nation	Player
21	FW	NOR	Håkon Lorentzen (on loan at Åsane Fotball)
24	DF	NOR	Alf Øivind Aslesen (on loan at Fram Larvik)
25	MF	NOR	Sabawon Shamohammad (on loan to (Norway) Fram Larvik)
34	MF	NOR	Herman Solberg Nilsen (on loan to (Norway) Fram Larvik)

== Transfers ==
=== Winter ===
In: Note: Flags indicate national team as defined under FIFA eligibility rules; some limited exceptions apply. Players may hold more than one non-FIFA nationality.

No.	Pos.	Nation	Player
6	FW	NOR	Mohamed Ofkir (from (Belgium) Lokeren)
7	MF	ISL	Emil Pálsson (from (Iceland) FH)
12	GK	NOR	Eirik Holmen Johansen (from (United States) New York City)
13	DF	ENG	Andrew Eleftheriou (on loan from (England) Watford)
15	FW	SWE	Pontus Engblom (from (Norway) Strømsgodset)

Out: Note: Flags indicate national team as defined under FIFA eligibility rules; some limited exceptions apply. Players may hold more than one non-FIFA nationality.

No.	Pos.	Nation	Player
5	DF	NOR	Alexander Gabrielsen (retired)
7	FW	URU	Facundo Rodríguez (loan return to (Uruguay) Peñarol)
10	MF	URU	Carlos Grossmüller (loan return to (Peru) Universitario)
12	GK	NOR	Øystein Øvretveit (to (Norway) Jerv)
14	DF	NED	Crescendo van Berkel (released)
18	MF	NOR	William Kurtovic (on loan to (Norway) Ull/Kisa)
20	DF	NOR	Kevin Jablinski (to (Norway) Raufoss, previously on loan)
21	FW	NOR	Håkon Lorentzen (on loan to (Norway) Åsane)
24	DF	NOR	Alf Øivind Aslesen (on loan to (Norway) Fram)
—	MF	NOR	Varg Støvland (to (Norway) Halsen, previously on loan)

=== Summer ===
In: Note: Flags indicate national team as defined under FIFA eligibility rules; some limited exceptions apply. Players may hold more than one non-FIFA nationality.

No.	Pos.	Nation	Player
1	GK	NOR	Jacob Storevik (from (Norway) Florø)
11	FW	NOR	Fitim Azemi (on loan from (Norway) Vålerenga)
13	DF	NOR	Marius Høibråten (from (Norway) Strømsgodset)
14	FW	ESP	Rufo (from (Spain) Mallorca)
17	DF	AND	Marc Vales (from (Finland) SJK Seinäjoki)
18	MF	SWE	William Kurtovic (loan return from (Norway) Ull/Kisa)
21	DF	NOR	Stian Ringstad (on loan from (Norway) Strømsgodset)
22	MF	NOR	Mohammed Fellah (from (Denmark) Nordsjælland)

Out: Note: Flags indicate national team as defined under FIFA eligibility rules; some limited exceptions apply. Players may hold more than one non-FIFA nationality.

No.	Pos.	Nation	Player
1	GK	ISL	Ingvar Jónsson (to (Denmark) Viborg)
11	FW	KOS	Flamur Kastrati (to (Norway) Kristiansund)
13	DF	ENG	Andrew Eleftheriou (loan return to (England) Watford)
17	DF	NOR	Joackim Solberg Olsen (to (Norway) Mjøndalen)
20	DF	SEN	Abdoulaye Seck (to (Belgium) Royal Antwerp)
22	MF	NOR	André Sødlund (to (Norway) Odd)
25	MF	NOR	Sabawon Shamohammad (on loan to (Norway) Fram Larvik)
34	MF	NOR	Herman Solberg Nilsen (on loan to (Norway) Fram Larvik)

== Friendlies ==
19 January 2018	Notodden	1–2	Sandefjord	Notodden
15:00 UTC (UTC+1)	Mbedule 10'	Summary	Kastrati 12' (pen.); Johansen 37' (o.g.)	Stadium: Idrettsparken; Attendance: 150

25 January 2018	Mjøndalen	6–1	Sandefjord	Mjøndalen
16:30 UTC (UTC+1)	Fredriksen 12'; Lindseth 24', 30'; Ibrahimaj 36', 76'; Hellum 85'	Summary	Storbæk 43'	Stadium: Isachsen Stadion; Attendance: 200

2 February 2018	Stabæk	1–0	Sandefjord	Bærum
17:00 UTC (UTC+1)	Brynhildsen 80'	Summary		Stadium: Nadderud kunstgress Attendance: 200

9 February 2018	Start	1–2	Sandefjord	Kristiansand
17:00 UTC (UTC+1)	Finnbogason 13'	Summary	Kastrati 53'; Normann Hansen 76'	Stadium: Sørlandshallen; Attendance: 427

== Competitions ==
=== Eliteserien ===
==== Results summary ====
Overall								Home						Away					
Pld	W	D	L	GF	GA	GD	Pts	W	D	L	GF	GA	GD	W	D	L	GF	GA	GD
30	4	11	15	35	57	−22	23	3	4	8	16	22	−6	1	7	7	19	35	−16

Last updated: 24 November 2018.
Source: see below

==== Results by round ====
Round	1	2	3	4	5	6	7	8	9	10	11	12	13	14	15	16	17	18	19	20	21	22	23	24	25	26	27	28	29	30
Ground	A	A	H	H	H	A	H	A	H	A	H	A	H	A	H	A	A	H	A	H	A	H	A	H	A	H	A	H	A	H
Result	L	W	D	L	D	L	L	L	L	L	L	L	L	D	L	L	D	W	D	L	D	D	D	D	D	W	L	W	D	L
Position	16	9	11	13	11	12	14	15	15	15	16	16	16	16	16	16	16	16	16	16	16	16	16	16	16	16	16	16	16	16

Updated to match(es) played on 24 November 2018. Source: see below
A = Away; H = Home; W = Win; D = Draw; L = Loss

==== Results ====
11 March 2018 1	Molde	5–0	Sandefjord	Molde
18:00 CET (UTC+1)	Aursnes 23' (pen.); Brustad 36'; Amang 57'; Forren (yellow card) 59'; Hestad 63'; Strand 65'	Report	Kane (yellow card) 23'; Vallès (yellow card) 29'; Kastrati (yellow card) 32'	Stadium: Aker Stadion; Attendance: 6,218; Referee: Ola Hobber Nilsen

2 April 2018 3	Start	1–4	Sandefjord	Kristiansand
18:00 CET (UTC+1)	Finnbogason 21'; Lowe (yellow card) 29'; Wichne (yellow card) 43'; Afeez (yellow card) 54'	Report	Storbæk 34'; Kane (yellow card) 56'; Vallès (yellow card) 61' (goal) 78'; Engblom 68', 84'	Stadium: Sør Arena; Attendance: 4,716; Referee: Kristoffer Hagenes

8 April 2018 4	Sandefjord	1–1	Stabæk	Sandefjord
18:00 CEST (UTC+2)	Olsen 34'	Report	Brochmann 26' (yellow card) 71'; Boli (yellow card) 85'	Stadium: Komplett Arena; Attendance: 2,756; Referee: Tore Hansen

11 April 2018 2	Sandefjord	1–2	Ranheim	Sandefjord
18:30 CEST (UTC+2)	Ofkir 30'; Olsen (yellow card) 75'	Report	Løkberg (yellow card) 35'; Rismark 78'; Tromsdal (yellow card) 86'; Helmersen 89'; Furu (yellow card) 90+3'	Stadium: Komplett Arena; Attendance: 2,461; Referee: Trond Ivar Døvle

15 April 2018 5	Sandefjord	3–3	Kristiansund	Sandefjord
18:00 CEST (UTC+2)	Engblom 7'; Olsen (yellow card) 71'; Kastrati 75' (pen.) (yellow card) 79'; Coly 90+3' (o.g.)	Report	Bamba 3', 47' (yellow card) 79'; Hansen 73' (o.g.); P.Ulvestad (yellow card) 77'; Stokke (yellow card) 88'	Stadium: Komplett Arena; Attendance: 2,615; Referee: Espen Eskås

22 April 2018 6	Tromsø	4–1	Sandefjord	Tromsø
18:00 CEST (UTC+2)	Espejord 6', 16'; Antonsen 30'; Berntsen 40'; Åsen (yellow card) 60'	Report	Kastrati 17'; Olsen (yellow card) 26'; Storbæk (yellow card) 88'	Stadium: Alfheim Stadion; Attendance: 3,692; Referee: Kai Erik Steen

29 April 2018 7	Sandefjord	0–1	Brann	Sandefjord
18:00 CEST (UTC+2)	Olsen (yellow card) 69'; Eleftheriou (yellow card) 70'	Report	Nilsen (yellow card) 42'; Larsen 50' (yellow card) 90+2'; Skålevik (yellow card) 68'	Stadium: Komplett Arena; Attendance: 4,672; Referee: Ola Hobber Nilsen

6 May 2018 8	Lillestrøm	1–0	Sandefjord	Lillestrøm
18:00 CEST (UTC+2)	Mathew 13'; Martin (yellow card) 88'	Report		Stadium: Åråsen Stadion; Attendance: 4,715; Referee: Kristoffer Hagenes

12 May 2018 9	Sandefjord	0–1	Vålerenga	Sandefjord
15:30 CEST (UTC+2)		Report	Adekugbe (yellow card) 11'; Friðjónsson (yellow card) 36'; Johnson 55' (pen.)	Stadium: Komplett Arena; Attendance: 3,826; Referee: Kai Erik Steen

16 May 2018 10	Odd	5–0	Sandefjord	Skien
18:00 CEST (UTC+2)	Broberg 25'; Kaasa 31'; Rashani 33'; Risa 73'; Børven 82'	Report	Pálsson (yellow card) 39'	Stadium: Skagerak Arena; Attendance: 6,122; Referee: Tommy Skjerven

21 May 2018 11	Sandefjord	0–1	Sarpsborg 08	Sandefjord
18:00 CEST (UTC+2)		Report	Halvorsen 44' (pen.)	Stadium: Komplett Arena; Attendance: 2,850; Referee: Tom Harald Hagen

27 May 2018 12	Strømsgodset	2–0	Sandefjord	Drammen
18:00 CEST (UTC+2)	Pedersen 45'; Pellegrino 83' (yellow card) 83'; Nguen (yellow card) 84'	Report	Grorud (yellow card) 46'	Stadium: Marienlyst Stadion; Attendance: 6,110; Referee: Ola Hobber Nilsen

10 June 2018 13	Sandefjord	0–2	Haugesund	Sandefjord
18:00 CEST (UTC+2)	Pálsson (yellow card) 11' (yellow-red card) 54'; Johansen (yellow card) 74'; Grorud (yellow card) 87'	Report	Skjerve 13'; Tronstad (yellow card) 19'; Karamoko 45'; Kallevåg (yellow card) 69'	Stadium: Komplett Arena; Attendance: 2,493; Referee: Kristoffer Hagenes

24 June 2018 14	Bodø/Glimt	1–1	Sandefjord	Bodø
18:00 CEST (UTC+2)	José Ángel 27'	Report	Kastrati 2'; Bindia (yellow card) 30'; Ofkir (yellow card) 78'; Seck (yellow card) 88'	Stadium: Aspmyra Stadion; Attendance: 2,615; Referee: Rohit Saggi

1 July 2018 15	Sandefjord	0–1	Rosenborg	Sandefjord
18:00 CEST (UTC+2)	Storbæk (yellow card) 22'; Kastrati (yellow card) 61'; Vallès (yellow card) 61'	Report	Konradsen (yellow card) 60'; Levi 83'	Stadium: Komplett Arena; Attendance: 3,849; Referee: Trygve Kjensli

8 July 2018 16	Haugesund	4–2	Sandefjord	Haugesund
18:00 CEST (UTC+2)	David 64'; Karamoko 66'; Grindheim 90'; Leite 90+3'	Report	Engblom 8', 39'; Ofkir (yellow card) 38'	Stadium: Haugesund Stadion; Attendance: 3,504; Referee: Dag Vidar Hafsås

5 August 2018 17	Vålerenga	2–2	Sandefjord	Oslo
18:00 CEST (UTC+2)	Michael 89'; Myhre 90+3'	Report	Kastrati 3' (pen.) (yellow card) 73'; Vales (yellow card) 56'; Ofkir (yellow card) 62' (goal) 80'; Vallès (yellow card) 89'	Stadium: Intility Arena; Attendance: 7,005; Referee: Tom Harald Hagen

10 August 2018 18	Sandefjord	1–0	Tromsø	Sandefjord
18:00 CEST (UTC+2)	Kurtovic 55'; Pálsson (yellow card) 80'	Report	Gundersen (yellow card) 48'	Stadium: Komplett Arena; Attendance: 5,319; Referee: Rohit Saggi

19 August 2018 19	Ranheim	1–1	Sandefjord	Trondheim
18:00 CEST (UTC+2)	Løkberg 54'	Report	Engblom 12'; Vales (yellow card) 46'; Storbæk (yellow card) 90+5'	Stadium: EXTRA Arena; Attendance: 1,393; Referee: Trond Ivar Døvle

26 August 2018 20	Sandefjord	1–3	Lillestrøm	Sandefjord
18:00 CEST (UTC+2)	Høibråten (yellow card) 22'; Pau Morer 80'	Report	Olsen 26'; Mathew (yellow card) 46'; Smárason 58', 71'	Stadium: Komplett Arena; Attendance: 3,430; Referee: Espen Eskås

1 September 2018 21	Stabæk	3–3	Sandefjord	Bærum
18:00 CEST (UTC+2)	Njie 17'; Boli 69', 90+8' (penalty missed) 90; Hanche-Olsen (yellow card) 78'	Report	Rufo 31' (yellow card) 44'; Johansen (yellow card) 50'; Fellah 55'; Hansen (yellow card) 66'; Storbæk 79'; Høibråten (yellow card) 84'; Ofkir (yellow card) 86'; Pau Morer (yellow card) 90+6'	Stadium: Nadderud Stadion; Attendance: 3,055; Referee: Kristoffer Hagenes

16 September 2018 22	Sandefjord	1–1	Bodø/Glimt	Sandefjord
18:00 CEST (UTC+2)	Pálsson (yellow card) 46'; Fellah 68'	Report	Ángel (yellow card) 45+1'; Bjørnbak 66'	Stadium: Komplett Arena; Attendance: 2,556; Referee: Trygve Kjensli

23 September 2018 23	Brann	1–1	Sandefjord	Bergen
18:00 CEST (UTC+2)	Skålevik 86'	Report	Storbæk 80'; Høibråten (yellow card) 85'; Pálsson (yellow card) 90+1'; Rufo (yellow card) 90+4'	Stadium: Brann Stadion; Attendance: 10,832; Referee: Tom Harald Hagen

29 September 2018 24	Sandefjord	1–1	Odd	Sandefjord
18:00 CEST (UTC+2)	Rufo 39' (yellow card) 84'	Report	Vales 52' (o.g.)	Stadium: Komplett Arena; Attendance: 2,601; Referee: Tommy Skjerven

7 October 2018 25	Rosenborg	1–1	Sandefjord	Trondheim
18:00 CEST (UTC+2)	Søderlund 69' (pen.); Šerbečić (yellow card) 72'	Report	Kurtovic (yellow card) 19'; Vallès (yellow card) 22'; Rufo 37'	Stadium: Lerkendal Stadion; Attendance: 13,908; Referee: Trond Ivar Døvle

20 October 2018 26	Sandefjord	2–1	Strømsgodset	Sandefjord
18:00 CEST (UTC+2)	Ofkir 4'; Rufo 74'	Report	Andersen 79'; Stengel (yellow card) 87'	Stadium: Komplett Arena; Attendance: 2,545; Referee: Ola Hobber Nilsen

28 October 2018 27	Kristiansund	3–2	Sandefjord	Kristiansund
18:00 CET (UTC+1)	Kastrati (yellow card) 14'; Sørli 27'; D.Ulvestad 33', 63' (yellow card) 61'	Report	Vales (yellow card) 14'; Rufo 19', 86'	Stadium: Kristiansund Stadion; Attendance: 4,045; Referee: Trygve Kjensli

4 November 2018 28	Sandefjord	4–1	Start	Sandefjord
18:00 CET (UTC+1)	Ringstad 7' (yellow card) 29'; Rufo 23'; Grorud 45+1'; Pálsson (yellow card) 49'; Morer (yellow card) 61' (goal) 90+3'	Report	Lowe 20'; Larsen (yellow card) 31'; Segberg (yellow card) 45'; Sandberg (yellow card) 87'	Stadium: Komplett Arena; Attendance: 2,505; Referee: Kristoffer Hagenes

11 November 2018 29	Sarpsborg 08	1–1	Sandefjord	Sarpsborg
18:00 CET (UTC+1)	Mortensen 60' (yellow card) 64'; Jørgensen (yellow card) 73'; Horn (yellow card) 77'; Askar (yellow card) 85'	Report	Vales (yellow card) 64'; Vallès 74'	Stadium: Sarpsborg Stadion; Attendance: 5,106; Referee: Trond Ivar Døvle

24 November 2018 30	Sandefjord	1–3	Molde	Sandefjord
18:00 CET (UTC+1)	Storbæk 8'; Morer (yellow card) 18'; Rufo (yellow card) 39'	Report	Haugen (yellow card) 39'; Eikrem (yellow card) 45+1', (goal) 75'; James 49', 72'	Stadium: Komplett Arena; Attendance: 2,564; Referee: Espen Eskås

==== Table ====
Pos	Team	Pld	W	D	L	GF	GA	GD	Pts	Qualification or relegation
12	Lillestrøm	30	7	11	12	34	44	−10	32	
13	Strømsgodset	30	7	10	13	46	48	−2	31	
14	Stabæk (O)	30	6	11	13	37	50	−13	29	Qualification for the relegation play-offs
15	Start (R)	30	8	5	17	30	54	−24	29	Relegation to First Division
16	Sandefjord (R)	30	4	11	15	35	57	−22	23	Relegation to First Division

Source: Football Association of Norway (in Norwegian), Soccerway
Rules for classification: 1) Points; 2) Goal difference; 3) Goals scored; 4) Head-to-head points; 5) Head-to-head goal difference; 6) Head-to-head away goals scored (only if between two teams); 7) Head-to-head goals scored; 8) Play-off (only used to decide champions or relegation).
(O) Play-off winners; (R) Relegated

=== Norwegian Cup ===
18 April 2018 First round	Eik-Tønsberg	1–6	Sandefjord	Eik
18:00 CEST (UTC+2)	J.Børstad (yellow card) 9'; V.Roberg (yellow card) 28'; J.Gulliksen 41'; A.Patros (yellow card) 59'	Report	Foss 12'; Kastrati 34', 44'; Engblom 49'; Storbæk (yellow card) 63'; Ofkir 88'; Mjelde 88'	Stadium: Eikbanen; Attendance: 711; Referee: Harald Magnus Børresen

2 May 2018 Second Round	Skeid	3–0	Sandefjord	Oslo
18:00 CEST (UTC+2)	A.Aleesami 23'; Hassan 69'; M.Can 74' (pen.)	Report	Jónsson (red card) 59'	Stadium: Nordre Åsen; Attendance: 483; Referee: Christian Moen

== Squad statistics ==
As of match played 1 September 2018

=== Appearances and goals ===
No.	Pos	Nat	Player	Total		Eliteserien		Norwegian Cup	
No.	Pos	Nat	Player	Apps	Goals	Apps	Goals	Apps	Goals
2	DF	(Norway) NOR	Lars Grorud	26	1	20+4	1	2	0
3	DF	(Norway) NOR	Sander Moen Foss	2	1	0	0	2	1
4	DF	(Norway) NOR	Christer Reppesgård Hansen	30	0	28+1	0	1	0
5	MF	(Spain) ESP	Enric Vallès	25	2	25	2	0	0
6	FW	(Norway) NOR	Mohamed Ofkir	23	4	14+7	3	2	1
7	MF	(Iceland) ISL	Emil Pálsson	19	0	18	0	1	0
8	MF	(Norway) NOR	Erik Mjelde	18	1	9+7	0	2	1
9	MF	(Norway) NOR	Håvard Storbæk	20	4	16+2	4	1+1	0
10	MF	(Spain) ESP	Pau Morer	22	2	14+8	2	0	0
11	FW	(Norway) NOR	Fitim Azemi	5	0	3+2	0	0	0
12	GK	(Norway) NOR	Eirik Johansen	30	0	29	0	0+1	0
13	DF	(Norway) NOR	Marius Høibråten	12	0	12	0	0	0
14	FW	(Spain) ESP	Rufo	12	7	10+2	7	0	0
15	FW	(Sweden) SWE	Pontus Engblom	30	7	22+7	6	1	1
16	DF	(Senegal) SEN	El-Hadji Gana Kane	8	0	8	0	0	0
17	DF	(Andorra) AND	Marc Vales	12	0	11+1	0	0	0
18	MF	(Sweden) SWE	William Kurtovic	11	1	6+5	1	0	0
19	DF	(Senegal) SEN	Victor Demba Bindia	16	0	13+3	0	0	0
21	DF	(Norway) NOR	Stian Ringstad	14	1	14	1	0	0
22	MF	(Norway) NOR	Mohammed Fellah	4	2	4	2	0	0
23	MF	(Norway) NOR	Ole Breistøl	6	0	0+5	0	0+1	0
46	FW	(Norway) NOR	George Gibson	13	0	0+11	0	1+1	0
47	MF	(Norway) NOR	Sander Mørk	1	0	0+1	0	0	0
Players away from Sandefjord on loan:
25	MF	(Norway) NOR	Sabawon Shamohammad	5	0	0+3	0	2	0
34	MF	(Norway) NOR	Herman Solberg Nilsen	8	0	4+3	0	0+1	0
Players who appeared for Sandefjord no longer at the club:
1	GK	(Iceland) ISL	Ingvar Jónsson	3	0	1	0	2	0
11	FW	(Kosovo) KOS	Flamur Kastrati	18	6	15+1	4	1+1	2
13	DF	(England) ENG	Andrew Eleftheriou	6	0	3+1	0	2	0
17	DF	(Norway) NOR	Joackim Solberg Olsen	17	1	13+2	1	2	0
20	DF	(Senegal) SEN	Abdoulaye Seck	6	0	2+4	0	0	0
22	MF	(Norway) NOR	André Sødlund	13	0	10+3	0	0	0

=== Goal scorers ===
Place	Position	Nation	Number	Name	Eliteserien	Norwegian Cup	Total
1	FW	(Spain)	14	Rufo	7	0	7
1	FW	(Sweden)	15	Pontus Engblom	6	1	7
3	FW	(Kosovo)	11	Flamur Kastrati	4	2	6
4	MF	(Norway)	9	Håvard Storbæk	4	0	4
4	FW	(Norway)	6	Mohamed Ofkir	3	1	4
6	MF	(Spain)	5	Enric Vallès	2	0	2
6	MF	(Spain)	10	Pau Morer	2	0	2
6	MF	(Norway)	22	Mohammed Fellah	2	0	2
9	DF	(Norway)	17	Joackim Solberg Olsen	1	0	1
9	MF	(Sweden)	18	William Kurtovic	1	0	1
9	DF	(Norway)	21	Stian Ringstad	1	0	1
9	DF	(Norway)	2	Lars Grorud	1	0	1
9	DF	(Norway)	3	Sander Moen Foss	0	1	1
9	MF	(Norway)	8	Erik Mjelde	0	1	1
9				Own goal	1	0	1
				TOTALS	35	6	41

=== Disciplinary record ===
Number	Nation	Position	Name	Eliteserien		Norwegian Cup		Total	
Number	Nation	Position	Name	Booked	Sent off (straight red)	Booked	Sent off (straight red)	Booked	Sent off (straight red)
2	(Norway)	DF	Lars Grorud	2	0	0	0	2	0
4	(Norway)	DF	Christer Reppesgård Hansen	1	0	0	0	1	0
5	(Spain)	MF	Enric Vallès	5	0	0	0	5	0
6	(Norway)	FW	Mohamed Ofkir	4	0	0	0	4	0
7	(Iceland)	MF	Emil Pálsson	7	1	0	0	7	1
9	(Norway)	MF	Håvard Storbæk	3	0	1	0	4	0
10	(Spain)	MF	Pau Morer	3	0	0	0	3	0
12	(Norway)	GK	Eirik Johansen	2	0	0	0	2	0
13	(Norway)	DF	Marius Høibråten	3	0	0	0	3	0
14	(Spain)	FW	Rufo	4	0	0	0	4	0
16	(Senegal)	DF	El-Hadji Gana Kane	2	0	0	0	2	0
17	(Andorra)	DF	Marc Vales	5	0	0	0	5	0
18	(Sweden)	MF	William Kurtovic	1	0	0	0	1	0
19	(Senegal)	DF	Victor Demba Bindia	1	0	0	0	1	0
21	(Norway)	DF	Stian Ringstad	1	0	0	0	1	0
Players away from Sandefjord on loan:
Players who left Sandefjord during the season:
1	(Iceland)	GK	Ingvar Jónsson	0	0	0	1	0	1
11	(Kosovo)	FW	Flamur Kastrati	4	0	0	0	4	0
13	(England)	DF	Andrew Eleftheriou	1	0	0	0	1	0
17	(Norway)	DF	Joackim Solberg Olsen	4	0	0	0	4	0
20	(Senegal)	DF	Abdoulaye Seck	1	0	0	0	1	0
			TOTALS	54	0	1	1	55	1
