= 2017 Sandefjord Fotball season =

Sandefjord
2017 season
- Chairman: Roger Gulliksen
- Manager: Lars Bohinen
- Stadium: Komplett Arena
- Eliteserien: 13th
- Norwegian Cup: Second Round vs Ørn-Horten
- Top goalscorer: League: Flamur Kastrati (10); All: Flamur Kastrati (10)
Home colours	Away colours	Third colours

The 2017 season is Sandefjord's first season back in the Tippeligaen following their relegation in 2015.

== Squad ==
As of 22 November 2017

Note: Flags indicate national team as defined under FIFA eligibility rules; some limited exceptions apply. Players may hold more than one non-FIFA nationality.

No.	Pos.	Nation	Player
1	GK	ISL	Ingvar Jónsson
2	DF	NOR	Lars Grorud (captain)
3	DF	SEN	Abdoulaye Seck
4	DF	NOR	Christer Reppesgård Hansen
5	DF	NOR	Alexander Gabrielsen
6	MF	ESP	Pau Morer
7	FW	URU	Facundo Rodriguez (loan from Peñarol)
8	MF	NOR	Erik Mjelde
9	MF	NOR	Håvard Storbæk
10	MF	URU	Carlos Grossmüller (loan from Universitario)
11	FW	KOS	Flamur Kastrati
12	GK	NOR	Øystein Øvretveit

No.	Pos.	Nation	Player
14	MF	NED	Crescendo van Berkel
15	MF	ESP	Enric Vallès
16	DF	SEN	El-Hadji Gana Kane
17	DF	NOR	Joackim Solberg Olsen
18	MF	SWE	William Kurtovic
19	DF	SEN	Victor Demba Bindia
20	DF	NOR	Kevin Jablinski
21	FW	NOR	Håkon Lorentzen
22	MF	NOR	André Sødlund
25	DF	NOR	Sabawon Shamohammad
30	DF	NOR	Ole Breistøl
—	MF	NOR	Thomas Kind Bendiksen

== Transfers ==
=== Winter ===
In: Note: Flags indicate national team as defined under FIFA eligibility rules; some limited exceptions apply. Players may hold more than one non-FIFA nationality.

No.	Pos.	Nation	Player
7	MF	NOR	Thomas Kind Bendiksen (from (Norway) Molde)
11	FW	KOS	Flamur Kastrati (from (Norway) Aalesund)
12	GK	NOR	Øystein Øvretveit (from (Norway) Nest-Sotra)
13	FW	NOR	Markus Naglestad (from (Norway) Fram Larvik)
14	DF	ENG	Elliot Kebbie (from (England) Barnsley)
16	DF	SEN	El-Hadji Gana Kane (from (Finland) SJK)
17	DF	NOR	Joackim Solberg Olsen (from (Norway) Mjøndalen)
20	DF	NOR	Kevin Jablinski (from (Norway) Fram Larvik)

Out: Note: Flags indicate national team as defined under FIFA eligibility rules; some limited exceptions apply. Players may hold more than one non-FIFA nationality.

No.	Pos.	Nation	Player
7	MF	NOR	Geir Ludvig Fevang (retired)
11	MF	NOR	Martin Torp (to (Norway) Ull/Kisa, previously on loan)
12	GK	NOR	Anders Gundersen (loan return to (Norway) Strømsgodset, later sold to (Norway) Arendal)
16	DF	NOR	Kjetil Berge (released)
19	FW	NOR	Kjell Rune Sellin (to (Norway) Sandnes Ulf)
20	MF	NOR	Varg Støvland (on loan to (Norway) Fram Larvik)
29	DF	NOR	Eirik Offenberg (retired)

=== Summer ===
In: Note: Flags indicate national team as defined under FIFA eligibility rules; some limited exceptions apply. Players may hold more than one non-FIFA nationality.

No.	Pos.	Nation	Player
7	FW	URU	Facundo Rodriguez (on loan from (Uruguay) Peñarol)
10	MF	URU	Carlos Grossmüller (on loan from (Peru) Universitario de Deportes)
14	MF	NED	Crescendo van Berkel (from (Netherlands) Telstar)
—	DF	NOR	Varg Støvland (loan return from (Norway) Fram Larvik)

Out: Note: Flags indicate national team as defined under FIFA eligibility rules; some limited exceptions apply. Players may hold more than one non-FIFA nationality.

No.	Pos.	Nation	Player
10	FW	HUN	Péter Kovács (to (Norway) Arendal)
13	FW	NOR	Markus Naglestad (to (Norway) HamKam)
14	DF	ENG	Elliot Kebbie (to (England) Billericay Town)
20	DF	NOR	Kevin Jablinski (on loan to (Norway) Raufoss)
—	DF	NOR	Varg Støvland (on loan to (Norway) Halsen)

== Competitions ==
=== Eliteserien ===
==== Results summary ====
Overall								Home						Away					
Pld	W	D	L	GF	GA	GD	Pts	W	D	L	GF	GA	GD	W	D	L	GF	GA	GD
30	11	3	16	38	51	−13	36	8	2	5	23	16	+7	3	1	11	15	35	−20

Last updated: 26 November 2017.
Source: see below

==== Results by round ====
Round	1	2	3	4	5	6	7	8	9	10	11	12	13	14	15	16	17	18	19	20	21	22	23	24	25	26	27	28	29	30
Ground	A	H	A	H	A	H	A	H	A	A	H	A	H	A	H	A	H	A	H	A	H	H	A	H	A	H	A	H	A	H
Result	L	L	W	W	L	D	W	W	L	L	D	L	W	D	L	L	W	W	W	L	W	L	L	W	L	L	L	W	L	L
Position	10	16	13	8	10	10	9	6	8	10	9	12	11	9	12	13	11	8	5	8	6	7	8	8	10	10	11	10	12	13

Updated to match(es) played on 26 November 2017. Source: see below
A = Away; H = Home; W = Win; D = Draw; L = Loss

==== Results ====
2 April 2017 1	Lillestrøm	2–1	Sandefjord	Lillestrøm
15:30 CEST (UTC+2)	Škoda 86'; Olsen 90+4' (o.g.)	Report	Kastrati 22'; Bindia (yellow card) 38'; Seck (yellow card) 85'; Storbæk (yellow card) 90+4'	Stadium: Åråsen Stadion; Attendance: 8,503; Referee: Martin Lundby

5 April 2017 2	Sandefjord	0–3	Rosenborg	Sandefjord
19:00 CEST (UTC+2)	Bindia (yellow card) 17' (yellow-red card) 45'; Kurtovic (yellow card) 45'; Kastrati (yellow card) 78'	Report	Hedenstad (yellow card) 4'; Vilhjálmsson 50'; Bendtner 74'; Konradsen (yellow card) 81'; Helland 85'	Stadium: Komplett Arena; Attendance: 6,103; Referee: Trond Ivar Døvle

9 April 2017 3	Vålerenga	1–2	Sandefjord	Oslo
18:00 CEST (UTC+2)	Tollås (yellow card) 37' (yellow-red card) 63' (goal) 49'	Report	Kane (yellow card) 35'; Kastrati 37' (pen.), 73' (yellow card) 38'; Kurtovic (yellow card) 39'; Jónsson (yellow card) 50'	Stadium: Ullevaal Stadion; Attendance: 6,778; Referee: Rohit Saggi

17 April 2017 4	Sandefjord	2–0	Kristiansund	Sandefjord
18:00 CEST (UTC+2)	Kurtovic (yellow card) 61'; Kastrati 67' (pen.); Sødlund 78'	Report		Stadium: Komplett Arena; Attendance: 3,356; Referee: Kai Erik Steen

22 April 2017 5	Strømsgodset	1–0	Sandefjord	Drammen
18:00 CEST (UTC+2)	Nguen (yellow card) 32' (goal) 65'; Parr (yellow card) 83'	Report		Stadium: Marienlyst Stadion; Attendance: 6,375; Referee: Tore Hansen

30 April 2017 6	Sandefjord	3–3	Molde	Sandefjord
18:00 CEST (UTC+2)	Sødlund (yellow card) 9'; Storbæk 34'; Seck 74'; Morer 90+6' (pen.)	Report	Sigurðarson 67', 72'; Brustad 76' (yellow card) 90+2'	Stadium: Komplett Arena; Attendance: 4,340; Referee: Trygve Kjensli

7 May 2017 7	Viking	0–2	Sandefjord	Stavanger
18:00 CEST (UTC+2)	Adegbenro (yellow card) 55'	Report	Kane (yellow card) 43'; Storbæk (yellow card) 45' (goal) 71'; Kurtovic (yellow card) 62'; Morer 69'	Stadium: Viking Stadion; Attendance: 7,261; Referee: Rohit Saggi

13 May 2017 8	Sandefjord	2–0	Haugesund	Sandefjord
18:00 CEST (UTC+2)	Seck 57'; Sødlund 88'	Report	Kiss (yellow card) 68'; Tronstad (yellow card) 75'	Stadium: Komplett Arena; Attendance: 3,167; Referee: Ola Hobber Nilsen

16 May 2017 9	Brann	5–0	Sandefjord	Bergen
18:00 CEST (UTC+2)	Barmen 5'; Haugen 14'; Orlov 40'; Rólantsson 41'; Jónsson 90+2'	Report	Kane (yellow card) 82'	Stadium: Brann Stadion; Attendance: 17,009; Referee: Martin Lundby

21 May 2017 10	Aalesund	2–0	Sandefjord	Ålesund
18:00 CEST (UTC+2)	Abdellaoue 9' (pen.); Gyasi 26'	Report	Hansen (yellow card) 21'; Morer (yellow card) 70'; Kastrati (yellow card) 90+4'	Stadium: Color Line Stadion; Attendance: 5,284; Referee: Rohit Saggi

27 May 2017 11	Sandefjord	0–0	Odd	Sandefjord
18:00 CEST (UTC+2)	Jónsson (yellow card) 90+4'	Report	Occéan (yellow card) 90+4'	Stadium: Komplett Arena; Attendance: 3,736; Referee: Trond Ivar Døvle

4 June 2017 12	Sogndal	3–2	Sandefjord	Sogndalsfjøra
18:00 CEST (UTC+2)	Moberg 16'; Jónsson (yellow card) 26'; Birkelund (yellow card) 42'; Koomson 45+3'; Bye 90+6'	Report	Wæhler 15' (o.g.); Vallès (yellow card) 31'; Sødlund 39'; Hansen (red card) 45+2'	Stadium: Fosshaugane Campus; Attendance: 2,463; Referee: Trygve Kjensli

18 June 2017 13	Sandefjord	1–0	Sarpsborg 08	Sandefjord
18:00 CEST (UTC+2)	Seck 43'; Olsen (yellow card) 76'	Report	Zachariassen (yellow card) 54'	Stadium: Komplett Arena; Attendance: 3,893; Referee: Espen Eskås

25 June 2017 14	Tromsø	1–1	Sandefjord	Tromsø
18:00 CEST (UTC+2)	Sigurðarson 32'; T.Olsen (yellow card) 53'	Report	Morer 1' (yellow card) 53'; Kastrati (yellow card) 12'; J.Olsen (yellow card) 64'; Bindia (yellow card) 83'; Vallès (yellow card) 90+3'	Stadium: Alfheim Stadion; Attendance: 3,555; Referee: Kai Erik Steen

2 July 2017 15	Sandefjord	1–2	Stabæk	Sandefjord
18:00 CEST (UTC+2)	Kastrati 84' (pen.)	Report	Ba (yellow card) 10'; Gyasi (yellow card) 47'; Kassi 50'; Omoijuanfo 63'; Brochmann (yellow card) 71'	Stadium: Komplett Arena; Attendance: 3,882; Referee: Rohit Saggi

8 July 2017 16	Rosenborg	5–1	Sandefjord	Trondheim
15:30 CEST (UTC+2)	Vilhjálmsson 23'; Bendtner 32' (pen.); Jensen 34'; Hedenstad 38', 75'; Meling (yellow card) 90'	Report	Bindia (yellow card) 32'; Vallés (yellow card) 31'; Kastrati 85'	Stadium: Lerkendal Stadion; Attendance: 16,571; Referee: Martin Sleire Lundby

16 July 2017 17	Sandefjord	3–0	Tromsø	Sandefjord
18:00 CEST (UTC+2)	Mjelde 1'; Olsen 5'; Seck (yellow card) 20'; Lorentzen 69'	Report	Jenssen (yellow card) 5'; Sigurðarson (yellow card) 67'; Michalsen (yellow card) 85'	Stadium: Komplett Arena; Attendance: 3,446; Referee: Svein Oddvar Moen

6 August 2017 18	Stabæk	1–3	Sandefjord	Bærum
18:00 CEST (UTC+2)	Sæter (yellow card) 45+1'; Skogseid 83'	Report	Kastrati 16' van Berkel (yellow card) 68'; Solberg 74'; Facundo Rodriguez 90+3'	Stadium: Nadderud Stadion; Attendance: 3,310; Referee: Dag Vidar Hafsås

11 August 2017 19	Sandefjord	2–1	Sogndal	Sandefjord
19:00 CEST (UTC+2)	Vallès (yellow card) 13'; Storbæk 45'; Kastrati (yellow card) 64'; Mjelde 89'	Report	Wæhler (yellow card) 12'; Nwakali (yellow card) 13'; Greenidge 48'; Steiring (yellow card) 79'	Stadium: Komplett Arena; Attendance: 5,806; Referee: Martin Lundby

20 August 2017 20	Odd	1–0	Sandefjord	Skien
18:00 CEST (UTC+2)	Nilsen (yellow card) 43'; Hussain 73'; Samuelsen (yellow card) 80'	Report	Bindia (yellow card) 60' (yellow-red card) 75'	Stadium: Skagerak Arena; Attendance: 7,546; Referee: Ola Hobber Nilsen

10 September 2017 21	Sandefjord	3–1	Viking	Sandefjord
18:00 CEST (UTC+2)	Grossmüller 18', 28'; Storbæk (yellow card) 23'; Kastrati 59' (pen.); Hansen (yellow card) 82'	Report	Guessan 14'; Gregov (yellow card) 16' (yellow-red card) 58'; Høiland (yellow card) 23'; Ryerson (yellow card) 49'; Green (yellow card) 73'	Stadium: Komplett Arena; Attendance: 3,159; Referee: Sigurd Kringstad

17 September 2017 22	Sandefjord	0–1	Brann	Sandefjord
18:00 CEST (UTC+2)	Hansen (yellow card) 68'; Grossmüller (yellow card) 71'	Report	Vega 27'	Stadium: Komplett Arena; Attendance: 5,502; Referee: Ola Hobber Nilsen

24 September 2017 23	Molde	3–1	Sandefjord	Molde
18:00 CEST (UTC+2)	Amang 14', 55'; Wadji (yellow card) 58'; Ellingsen 78'	Report	Rodriguez 21'; Seck (yellow card) 69'	Stadium: Aker Stadion; Referee: Kristoffer Hagenes

1 October 2017 24	Sandefjord	2–0	Aalesund	Sandefjord
18:00 CEST (UTC+2)	Solberg (yellow card) 45'; Grossmüller 68'; Sødlund 81'; Rodriguez (yellow card) 86'	Report	Marlinho (yellow card) 35'	Stadium: Komplett Arena; Attendance: 3,426; Referee: Trygve Kjensli

15 October 2017 25	Haugesund	2–0	Sandefjord	Haugesund
18:00 CEST (UTC+2)	Serafin (yellow card) 12'; Ikedi 16'; Ibrahim 83'; Andreassen (yellow card) 88'; Tronstad (yellow card) 90+2'	Report	van Berkel (yellow card) 73'; Morer (yellow card) 81'; Kastrati (yellow card) 86'	Stadium: Haugesund Stadion; Attendance: 3,721; Referee: Dag Vidar Hafsås

22 October 2017 26	Sandefjord	1–2	Strømsgodset	Sandefjord
18:00 CEST (UTC+2)	Kastrati 46' (yellow card) 50'; Grorud (yellow card) 69'	Report	Andersen 31'; Hauger (yellow card) 45'; Pedersen 62'; Pettersen (yellow card) 90+2'	Stadium: Komplett Arena; Attendance: 3,222; Referee: Kristoffer Hagenes

29 October 2017 27	Sarpsborg 08	5–0	Sandefjord	Sarpsborg
18:00 CEST (UTC+2)	Jørgensen 3', 48'; Halvorsen (yellow card) 12' (goal) 64'; Zachariassen 32', 39'; Askar (yellow card) 76'	Report	Reppesgård (yellow card) 15'; Bindia (yellow card) 41'; Olsen (yellow card) 45+2'	Stadium: Sarpsborg Stadion; Attendance: 4,797; Referee: Tommy Skjerven

3 November 2017 28	Sandefjord	2–0	Vålerenga	Sandefjord
19:00 CEST (UTC+2)	Morer 27' (yellow card) 45'; Storbæk (yellow card) 55'; Sødlund 57'	Report		Stadium: Komplett Arena; Attendance: 4,103; Referee: Tom Harald Hagen

19 November 2017 29	Kristiansund	3–2	Sandefjord	Kristiansund
18:00 CEST (UTC+2)	Bamba 10'; Gjertsen 30' (yellow card) 54'; Økland 72'	Report	Kastrati 36' van Berkel (yellow card) 56'; Kane 70' (yellow card) 83'	Stadium: Kristiansund Stadion; Attendance: 4,080; Referee: Espen Eskås

26 November 2017 30	Sandefjord	1–3	Lillestrøm	Sandefjord
18:00 CET (UTC+1)	Morer 43' (yellow card) 64'; Grorud (yellow card) 71'; Hansen (yellow card) 78'	Report	Melgalvis 24'; Krogstad 44', 90'	Stadium: Komplett Arena; Attendance: 3,034; Referee: Trygve Kjensli

==== Table ====
Pos	Team	Pld	W	D	L	GF	GA	GD	Pts	Qualification or relegation
11	Tromsø	30	10	8	12	42	49	−7	38	
12	Lillestrøm	30	10	7	13	40	43	−3	37	Qualification for the Europa League second qualifying round (Note: Lillestrøm qualified for the Europa League second qualifying round as winners of the 2017 Norwegian Cup.)
13	Sandefjord	30	11	3	16	38	51	−13	36	
14	Sogndal (R)	30	8	8	14	38	48	−10	32	Qualification for the relegation play-offs
15	Aalesund (R)	30	8	8	14	38	50	−12	32	Relegation to First Division

Source: Football Association of Norway (in Norwegian), Soccerway
Rules for classification: 1) Points; 2) Goal difference; 3) Goals scored; 4) Head-to-head points; 5) Head-to-head goal difference; 6) Head-to-head away goals scored (only if between two teams); 7) Head-to-head goals scored; 8) Play-off (only used to decide champions or relegation).
(R) Relegated

=== Norwegian Cup ===
26 April 2017 First Round	Flint	1–2	Sandefjord	Tønsberg
18:00 CEST (UTC+2)	H.Bratteli 37'; A.Chomiuk (yellow card) 62'	Report	Naglestad (yellow card) 39'; Holt 53'; Lorentzen 82'; Shamohammad (yellow card) 90+2'	Stadium: Løveid kunstgress Attendance: 650; Referee: Adrian Gjendemsjø

24 May 2017 Second Round	Ørn-Horten	3–1	Sandefjord	Horten
18:00 CEST (UTC+2)	A.Patros (yellow card) 50'; L.Bransdal 54', 56'; A.Brovina 87'	Report	Kastrati (yellow card) 5'; Shamohammad (yellow card) 27'; Kovács 86' (pen.)	Stadium: Lystlunden; Attendance: 500; Referee: Mohammad Usman Aslam

== Squad statistics ==
As of match played 26 November 2017

=== Appearances and goals ===
No.	Pos	Nat	Player	Total		Eliteserien		Norwegian Cup	
No.	Pos	Nat	Player	Apps	Goals	Apps	Goals	Apps	Goals
1	GK	(Iceland) ISL	Ingvar Jónsson	30	0	30	0	0	0
2	DF	(Norway) NOR	Lars Grorud	11	0	8+3	0	0	0
3	DF	(Senegal) SEN	Abdoulaye Seck	30	3	25+3	3	0+2	0
4	DF	(Norway) NOR	Christer Reppesgård Hansen	29	0	29	0	0	0
5	DF	(Norway) NOR	Alexander Gabrielsen	7	0	1+4	0	2	0
6	MF	(Spain) ESP	Pau Morer	30	5	28	5	0+2	0
7	FW	(Uruguay) URU	Facundo Rodríguez	7	2	3+4	2	0	0
8	MF	(Norway) NOR	Erik Mjelde	18	2	7+10	2	1	0
9	MF	(Norway) NOR	Håvard Storbæk	28	3	27	3	1	0
10	MF	(Uruguay) URU	Carlos Grossmüller	12	3	7+5	3	0	0
11	FW	(Kosovo) KOS	Flamur Kastrati	27	10	24+2	10	1	0
12	GK	(Norway) NOR	Øystein Øvretveit	3	0	0+1	0	2	0
14	DF	(Netherlands) NED	Crescendo van Berkel	9	0	9	0	0	0
15	MF	(Spain) ESP	Enric Vallès	26	0	26	0	0	0
16	DF	(Senegal) SEN	El-Hadji Gana Kane	22	1	18+3	1	1	0
17	DF	(Norway) NOR	Joackim Solberg Olsen	27	2	27	2	0	0
18	MF	(Sweden) SWE	William Kurtovic	20	0	9+10	0	1	0
19	DF	(Senegal) SEN	Victor Demba Bindia	27	0	26+1	0	0	0
21	FW	(Norway) NOR	Håkon Lorentzen	9	2	0+7	1	2	1
22	MF	(Norway) NOR	André Sødlund	30	5	22+7	5	1	0
25	MF	(Norway) NOR	Sabawon Shamohammad	7	0	0+5	0	2	0
30	MF	(Norway) NOR	Ole Breistøl	3	0	0+2	0	1	0
34	MF	(Norway) NOR	Herman Solberg Nilsen	1	0	0	0	1	0
Players away from Sandefjord on loan:
20	DF	(Norway) NOR	Kevin Jablinski	2	0	0+1	0	1	0
Players who left Sandefjord during the season:
10	FW	(Hungary) HUN	Péter Kovács	4	1	0+2	0	0+2	1
13	FW	(Norway) NOR	Markus Naglestad	7	0	1+5	0	1	0
14	DF	(England) ENG	Elliot Kebbie	9	0	3+5	0	1	0
23	DF	(Norway) NOR	Mats Holt	3	1	0+1	0	2	1
27	MF	(Norway) NOR	Jon Simen Jarbekk	1	0	0	0	1	0

=== Goal scorers ===
Place	Position	Nation	Number	Name	Eliteserien	Norwegian Cup	Total
1	FW	(Kosovo)	11	Flamur Kastrati	10	0	10
2	MF	(Norway)	22	André Sødlund	5	0	5
2	MF	(Spain)	6	Pau Morer	5	0	5
4	DF	(Senegal)	3	Abdoulaye Seck	3	0	3
4	MF	(Norway)	9	Håvard Storbæk	3	0	3
4	MF	(Uruguay)	10	Carlos Grossmüller	3	0	3
7	DF	(Norway)	17	Joackim Solberg Olsen	2	0	2
7	MF	(Norway)	8	Erik Mjelde	2	0	2
7	FW	(Uruguay)	7	Facundo Rodriguez	2	0	2
7	FW	(Norway)	21	Håkon Lorentzen	1	1	2
11	DF	(Senegal)	16	El-Hadji Gana Kane	1	0	1
11	DF	(Norway)	23	Mats Holt	0	1	1
11	FW	(Hungary)	10	Péter Kovács	0	1	1
11				Own goal	1	0	1
				TOTALS	38	3	41

=== Disciplinary record ===
Number	Nation	Position	Name	Eliteserien		Norwegian Cup		Total	
Number	Nation	Position	Name	Yellow card	Red card	Yellow card	Red card	Yellow card	Red card
1	(Iceland)	GK	Ingvar Jónsson	2	0	0	0	2	0
2	(Norway)	DF	Lars Grorud	2	0	0	0	2	0
3	(Senegal)	DF	Abdoulaye Seck	3	0	0	0	3	0
4	(Norway)	DF	Christer Reppesgård Hansen	5	1	0	0	5	1
6	(Spain)	MF	Pau Morer	5	0	0	0	5	0
7	(Uruguay)	FW	Facundo Rodriguez	1	0	0	0	1	0
9	(Norway)	MF	Håvard Storbæk	4	0	0	0	4	0
10	(Uruguay)	MF	Carlos Grossmüller	1	0	0	0	1	0
11	(Kosovo)	FW	Flamur Kastrati	7	0	1	0	8	0
13	(Norway)	FW	Markus Naglestad	0	0	1	0	1	0
14	(Netherlands)	DF	Crescendo van Berkel	3	0	0	0	3	0
15	(Spain)	MF	Enric Vallès	4	0	0	0	4	0
16	(Senegal)	DF	El-Hadji Gana Kane	4	0	0	0	4	0
17	(Norway)	DF	Joackim Solberg Olsen	4	0	0	0	4	0
18	(Sweden)	MF	William Kurtovic	4	0	0	0	4	0
19	(Senegal)	DF	Victor Demba Bindia	8	2	0	0	8	2
22	(Norway)	MF	André Sødlund	1	0	0	0	1	0
25	(Norway)	MF	Sabawon Shamohammad	0	0	2	0	2	0
			TOTALS	58	3	4	0	62	3
