= Facundo Rodríguez =

Facundo Rodríguez may refer to:

- Facundo Rodríguez (footballer, born 1995), Uruguayan forward
- Facundo Rodríguez (footballer, born 2000), Argentine defender
