= Brimah Kebbie =

English rugby league & union footballer and coach

Personal information
- Born: 21 September 1965 (age 59); London, England

Playing information

Rugby league
- Position: Wing
Club
Years	Team	Pld	T	G	FG	P
1988–90	Widnes	19	18	8	0	88
1990–91	St Helens	9	2	0	0	8
1991–92	Huddersfield	15	16	0	0	64
1992–94	Bradford Northern	37	25	0	0	100
1994–96	Huddersfield	26	12	1	0	50
	Total	106	73	9	0	310

Rugby union
- Position: Wing
Club
Years	Team	Pld	T	G	FG	P
1996	Saracens F.C.

Coaching information
Club
Years	Team	Gms	W	D	L	W%
2010	London Nigerian RFC
≤2011–≥14	Imperial College London
2014	Hillingdon Abbotstonians
	Total	0	0	0	0
- Relatives: Elliot Kebbie (son)

Brimah Kebbie (born 21 September 1965) is an English former rugby league and rugby union footballer who played in the 1980s and 1990s, and current rugby union coach. He played club level rugby league (RL) for Widnes, St. Helens, Huddersfield (two spells) and Bradford Northern, as a wing, and club level rugby union (RU) for Saracens F.C., as a wing, he coached club level rugby union (RU) for London Nigerian RFC, Imperial College London, and Hillingdon Abbotstonians (in Hayes, Hillingdon) in the Herts/Middlesex 2 league, and Strength and conditioning coach at St. Helens.

== Early life ==
Born in London to Sierra Leonean parents, Kebbie was educated at Prior Park College in Bath.

== Rugby career ==
Kebbie played rugby union for Broughton Park RUFC before switching codes in 1988 to sign for rugby league club Widnes.

During the 1989–90 season, Brimah Kebbie was an interchange/substitute for defending champions Widnes in the 30-18 victory over the visiting Canberra Raiders in the 1989 World Club Challenge at Old Trafford, Manchester on Wednesday 4 October 1989.

In March 1990, Kebbie was signed by St Helens for a fee of around £40,000.

Kebbie played for Bradford Northern when they finished as runners-up to Wigan in the Championship during the 1993–94 season.

In May 1996, Kebbie returned to rugby union and signed for Saracens F.C.

== Personal life ==
Kebbie is the father of the (soccer) association footballer; Elliot Kebbie.
