= Abdoulaye Seck (footballer, born 1992) =

Senegalese footballer (born 1992)

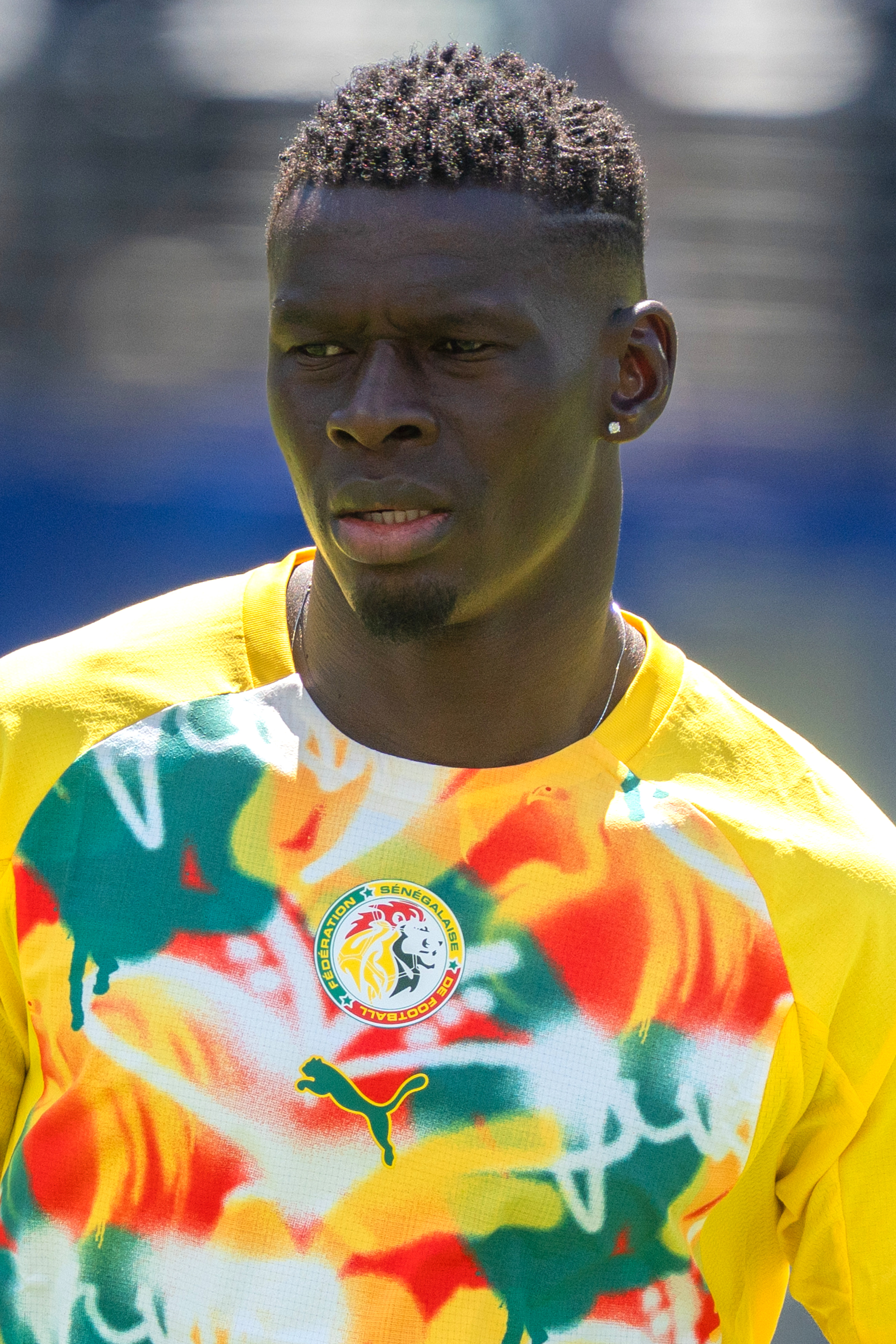
- Seck with Senegal in 2026

Personal information
- Date of birth: 4 June 1992 (age 34)
- Place of birth: M'Bour, Senegal
- Height: 1.92 m (6 ft 4 in)
- Position: Centre-back

Team information
- Current team: Al Faisaly

Senior career*
| Years | Team | Apps | (Gls) |
| 2010 | Stade de Mbour | | |
| 2010–2012 | Touré Kunda | | |
| 2012–2013 | Casa Sports | | |
| 2013–2014 | Diambars | | |
| 2014 | → Hønefoss (loan) | 11 | (2) |
| 2015 | Hønefoss | 24 | (4) |
| 2016–2018 | Sandefjord | 55 | (3) |
| 2018–2022 | Antwerp | 76 | (6) |
| 2022–2026 | Maccabi Haifa | 111 | (7) |
| 2026- | Al Faisaly | 4 | (1) |

International career^{‡}
| 2013– | Senegal | 26 | (4) |
Medal record
Men's football
Representing Senegal
Africa Cup of Nations
| Winner | 2021 Cameroon |
| Runner-up | 2025 Morocco |
- * Club domestic league appearances and goals as of 30 August 2026 ‡ National team caps and goals as of 26 June 2026

Abdoulaye Seck (born 4 June 1992) is a Senegalese professional footballer who plays as a centre-back for Saudi Arabian football club Al Faisaly and the Senegal national team.

Seck was part of Senegal's squad for the 2021 Africa Cup of Nations; the Lions of Teranga went on to win the tournament for the first time in their history. Seck was appointed a Grand Officer of the National Order of the Lion by President of Senegal Macky Sall following the nation's victory at the tournament.

== Club career ==
Seck began his career playing for Stade de Mbour, Touré Kunda, Casa Sports, and Diambars. In the summer of 2014, he joined Norwegian club Hønefoss on loan. On 10 August, he made his debut in the Norwegian First Division in a match against Kristiansund. On 25 August, he scored his first goal for Hønefoss in a match against Tromsø. At the end of his loan spell, the club made his transfer permanent.

In 2016, Seck moved to Sandefjord. He made his debut for the club on 3 April in a match against Strømmen IF. At the end of the season, he helped the club gain promotion to the top flight. On 2 April 2017, he made his debut in the Eliteserien in a match against Lillestrøm SK. On 30 April, he scored his first goal for Sandefjord in a match against Molde.

In the summer of 2018, Seck joined Belgian club Antwerp. On 26 September, he made his debut for the first team in a Belgian Cup match against KV Mechelen. On 19 May 2019, he made his debut in the Belgian Pro League in a match against Club Brugge. In 2020, he helped the club win the national cup. On 13 September, he scored his first goal for Antwerp in a match against Sint-Truiden.

In 2022, Seck transferred to Israeli club Maccabi Haifa. On 10 September, he made his league debut in the Israeli Premier League against Sektzia Nes Tziona. On 25 October, he scored a brace in the UEFA Champions League match against Paris Saint-Germain, marking his first goals for Maccabi Haifa. In 2023, he helped the club win the Israeli Premier League title. On 9 November, he scored in a UEFA Europa League match against Villarreal.

== International career ==
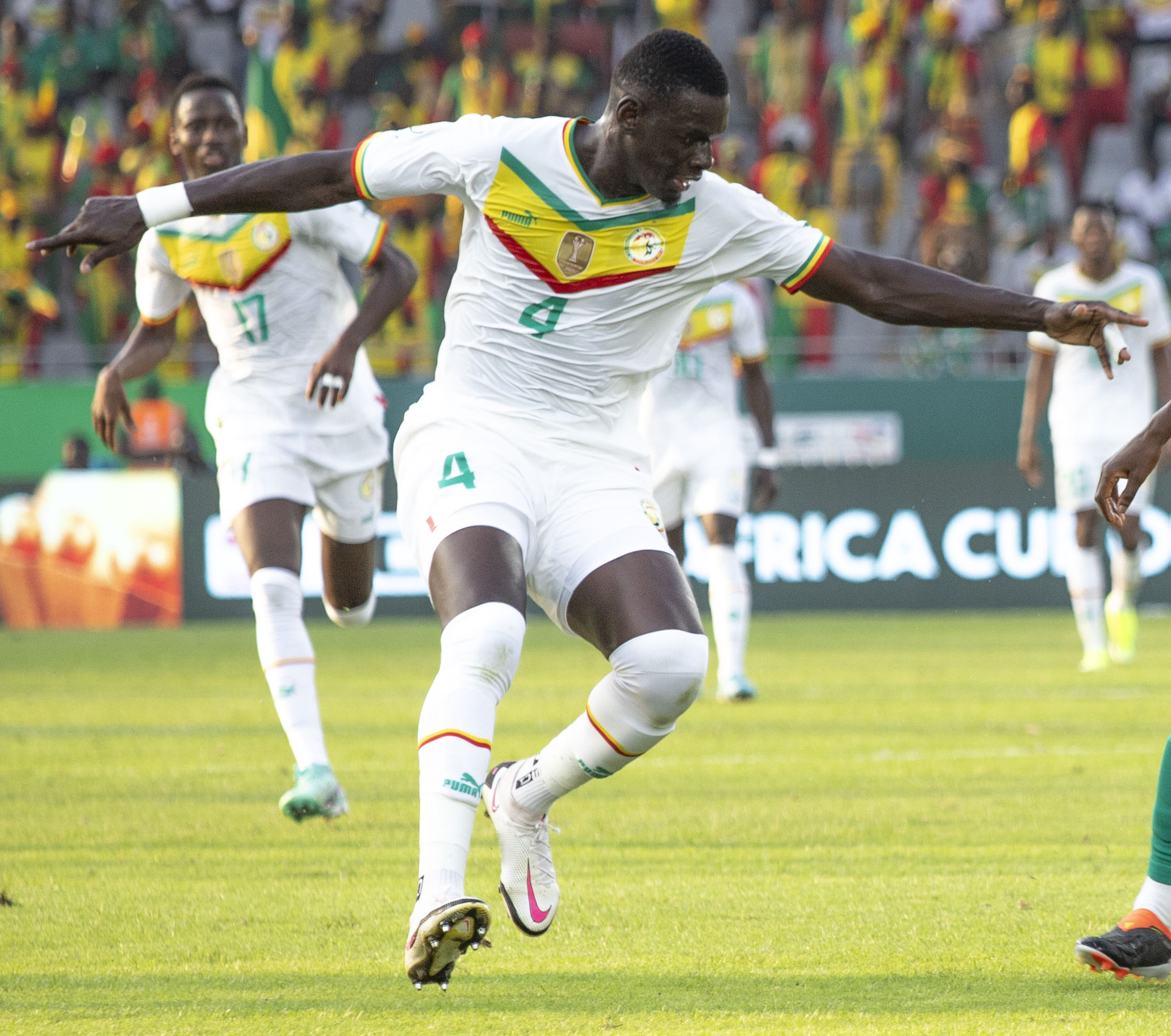
Seck with Senegal at the 2023 Africa Cup of Nations

Seck made his debut for Senegal as a substitute in a 2–0 Africa Cup of Nations qualifier against Congo.

In 2022, Seck won the 2021 Africa Cup of Nations held in Cameroon. He was part of the squad as a substitute and did not make any appearances during the tournament.

In December 2023, he was named in Senegal's squad for the postponed 2023 Africa Cup of Nations held in the Ivory Coast.

In 2025, Seck came second in the 2025 Africa Cup of Nations held in Morocco. During the tournament, he featured in matches against Benin, Sudan, and Morocco.

On 21 May 2026, Diarra was officially selected by Senegal's coach Pape Thiaw from his list of 28 players to participate in the 2026 FIFA World Cup.

== Career statistics ==
=== Club ===
As of match played 30 November 2023

Appearances and goals by club, season and competition
| Club | Season | Division | League | | Cup | | Europe | | Total | |
| Club | Season | Division | Apps | Goals | Apps | Goals | Apps | Goals | Apps | Goals |
|---|---|---|---|---|---|---|---|---|---|---|
| Hønefoss | 2014 | 1. divisjon | 11 | 2 | 0 | 0 | - | | 11 | 2 |
| Hønefoss | 2015 | 1. divisjon | 24 | 4 | 3 | 0 | - | | 27 | 4 |
| Hønefoss | Total | | 35 | 6 | 3 | 0 | 0 | 0 | 38 | 6 |
| Sandefjord | 2016 | 1. divisjon | 21 | 0 | 4 | 1 | - | | 25 | 1 |
| Sandefjord | 2017 | Eliteserien | 28 | 3 | 2 | 0 | - | | 30 | 3 |
| Sandefjord | 2018 | Eliteserien | 6 | 0 | 0 | 0 | - | | 6 | 0 |
| Sandefjord | Total | | 55 | 3 | 6 | 1 | 0 | 0 | 61 | 4 |
| Royal Antwerp | 2018–19 | Belgian First Division A | 2 | 0 | 1 | 0 | - | | 3 | 0 |
| Royal Antwerp | 2019–20 | Belgian First Division A | 13 | 0 | 2 | 0 | 3 | 0 | 18 | 0 |
| Royal Antwerp | 2020–21 | Belgian First Division A | 37 | 4 | 3 | 0 | 6 | 0 | 46 | 4 |
| Royal Antwerp | 2021–22 | Belgian First Division A | 24 | 2 | 1 | 0 | 2 | 0 | 27 | 2 |
| Royal Antwerp | Total | | 76 | 6 | 7 | 0 | 11 | 0 | 94 | 6 |
| Maccabi Haifa | 2022–23 | Israeli Premier League | 28 | 3 | 3 | 1 | 6 | 2 | 37 | 6 |
| Maccabi Haifa | 2023–24 | Israeli Premier League | 6 | 1 | 0 | 0 | 12 | 1 | 18 | 2 |
| Maccabi Haifa | Total | | 34 | 4 | 3 | 1 | 18 | 3 | 55 | 8 |
| Career total | | | 200 | 19 | 19 | 2 | 29 | 3 | 245 | 24 |

=== International ===
As of match played 26 June 2026

Appearances and goals by national team and year
| National team | Year | Apps | Goals |
|---|---|---|---|
| Senegal | 2013 | 2 | 0 |
| Senegal | 2021 | 3 | 0 |
| Senegal | 2023 | 3 | 1 |
| Senegal | 2024 | 8 | 1 |
| Senegal | 2025 | 5 | 1 |
| Senegal | 2026 | 5 | 1 |
| Total | | 26 | 4 |

Scores and results list Senegal's goal tally first, score column indicates score after each Seck goal.

List of international goals scored by Abdoulaye Seck
| No. | Date | Venue | Opponent | Score | Result | Competition | Ref. |
|---|---|---|---|---|---|---|---|
| 1 | 17 June 2023 | Stade de l'Amitié, Cotonou, Benin | Benin | 1–0 | 1–1 | 2023 Africa Cup of Nations qualification | |
| 2 | 23 January 2024 | Charles Konan Banny Stadium, Yamoussoukro, Ivory Coast | Guinea | 1–0 | 2–0 | 2023 Africa Cup of Nations | |
| 3 | 30 December 2025 | Tangier Grand Stadium, Tangier, Morocco | Benin | 1–0 | 3–0 | 2025 Africa Cup of Nations | |
| 4 | 31 March 2026 | Diamniadio Olympic Stadium, Diamniadio, Senegal | Gambia | 1–0 | 3–1 | Friendly | |

== Honours ==
Royal Antwerp

- Belgian Cup: 2019–20

Maccabi Haifa

- Israeli Premier League: 2022–23
- Israel Super Cup: 2023

Senegal

- Africa Cup of Nations: 2021

Individual

- Israeli Premier League Best Foreign Player: 2022–23

Orders

- Grand Officer of the National Order of the Lion: 2022
