= Andrew Eleftheriou =

English footballer (born 1997)

Personal information
- Full name: Andrew Eleftheriou
- Date of birth: 8 November 1997 (age 29)
- Place of birth: Islington, England
- Height: 5 ft 10 in (1.78 m)
- Position: Defender

Youth career
- 2005–2016: Watford

Senior career*
Years	Team	Apps	(Gls)
2016–2019	Watford	1	(0)
2018	→ Sandefjord (loan)	4	(0)
2019	→ Braintree Town (loan)	18	(0)
2019–2021	Dagenham & Redbridge	37	(1)
2021–2022	Wealdstone	11	(0)
- * Club domestic league appearances and goals as of 00:22, 18 May 2022 (UTC)

Andrew Eleftheriou (born 8 November 1997) is an English professional footballer who last played as a defender for Wealdstone. He came through the youth system at Watford, making one Premier League appearance in 2017, and subsequently played on loan for Sandefjord and Braintree Town before his release in 2019.

Eleftheriou was born in England, and is of Cypriot descent.

== Club career ==
Eleftheriou made his senior debut for Watford in a 5–0 home defeat against Manchester City on the last day of the 2016–17 Premier League season, coming on as a 39th-minute substitute for Daryl Janmaat.

On 27 March 2018, Eleftheriou joined Norwegian Eliteserien side Sandefjord on loan until 19 July. He made four league appearances and on 2 July returned to Watford to commence pre-season training.

Eleftheriou joined National League side Braintree Town on loan on 4 January 2019 until the end of the 2018–19 season. He played 18 times for the club as they were relegated from the division and was released by Watford in May 2019.

On 2 July 2019, Eleftheriou joined National League side Dagenham & Redbridge on a one-year contract. He was released by Dagenham along with five others in June 2021 following the expiration of his contract.

On 30 June 2021, Eleftheriou signed for Wealdstone. He made his debut on 21 August, against Woking, getting an assist in a 2-1 defeat. Eleftheriou made 12 appearances in total before an injury in November ruled him out for the season. On 17 May 2022, it was announced that Eleftheriou had been released by the club.

== Career statistics ==
As of match played 9 October 2021

Appearances and goals by club, season and competition
Club	Season	League			National Cup (Note: Includes Norwegian Football Cup, FA Cup)		League Cup		Other		Total	
Club	Season	Division	Apps	Goals	Apps	Goals	Apps	Goals	Apps	Goals	Apps	Goals
Watford	2016–17	Premier League	1	0	0	0	0	0	—		1	0
Watford	2017–18	Premier League	0	0	0	0	0	0	—		0	0
Watford	2018–19	Premier League	0	0	0	0	0	0	—		0	0
Watford	Total		1	0	0	0	0	0	—		1	0
Sandefjord (loan)	2018	Eliteserien	4	0	2	0	—		—		6	0
Braintree Town (loan)	2018–19	National League	18	0	—		—		—		18	0
Dagenham & Redbridge	2019–20	National League	19	0	0	0	—		1 (Note: Appearances in FA Trophy)	0	20	0
Dagenham & Redbridge	2020–21	National League	18	1	1	0	—		2	0	21	1
Dagenham & Redbridge	Total		37	1	1	0	—		3	0	41	1
Wealdstone	2021–22	National League	11	0	1	0	—		0	0	12	0
Career total			71	1	4	0	0	0	3	0	78	1
