= Elliot Kebbie =

English footballer (born 1994)

Personal information
- Date of birth: 11 September 1994 (age 32)
- Place of birth: Huddersfield, England
- Positions: Defender; midfielder

Youth career
- 2003–2012: Leeds United

Senior career*
Years	Team	Apps	(Gls)
2012–2014	Atlético Madrid	0	(0)
2012–2014	Atlético Madrid C	23	(1)
2012	→ Rangers (loan)	0	(0)
2014	Hull City	0	(0)
2014–2015	Brighouse Town		
2015–2016	Salford City	19	(1)
2016	Bradford Park Avenue	1	(0)
2016–2017	Barnsley	0	(0)
2017	Sandefjord	8	(0)
2017–2018	Billericay Town	5	(0)

International career
2009–2010	England U-16		
Father	Brimah Kebbie
- * Club domestic league appearances and goals as of 21:39, 22 January 2018 (UTC)

Elliot Kebbie (born 11 September 1994) is an English former professional footballer. A graduate of Leeds United's academy, he played as a defender or midfielder for Atlético Madrid C, Rangers and Sandefjord and the England U-16 team.

== Football career ==
=== Club ===
Elliot Kebbie is the son of the former rugby league and rugby union player, and rugby union coach Brimah Kebbie. Kebbie joined Leeds United from Brighouse Juniors at the age of seven, remaining in the club's youth system for nine years.

After spending two months on trial with Barcelona in 2011, Kebbie eventually signed for Atlético Madrid in January 2012, where he played for their 'C' team. Kebbie went on loan to Rangers in August 2012, before being forced to return to his home town after being struck down by the Epstein–Barr virus, which forced him out of the game for eighteen months.

On 23 January 2014 Kebbie signed a short-term contract with Premier League side Hull City, to aid his rehabilitation before then going on trial with Doncaster Rovers in July 2014. He joined Brighouse Town in October 2014.

In July 2015 Kebbie had overcome a post viral fatigue syndrome and joined Salford City, before signing briefly for Bradford Park Avenue, and then immediately a six-month contract with Barnsley's development squad on 12 July 2016. In November 2016 Kebbie went on trial with Birmingham City but decided upon regular first team football at Sandefjord in Norway.

==== Sandefjord ====
In January 2017 Kebbie joined Sandefjord on trial, eventually signing for the club and making his debut for Sandefjord on 5 April 2017, in a 3–0 defeat to Rosenborg.

==== Billericay Town ====
In August 2017 Kebbie returned to England to sign for Billericay Town. After a few weeks with Billericay Town it was alleged that club owner Glenn Tamplin wanted to reduce his wages and even offered him a payoff before also sending 'Gangster Threats' to Kebbie. He left the club in February 2018.

=== International ===
Born in England, Kebbie is of Sierra Leonean descent through his father. In August 2009, Kebbie was called up to the England U-16 squad, playing three matches.

== Post-football ==
After retiring from football Kebbie joined the armed forces in 2018, transferring to the Royal Marines in 2020. In 2022 West Yorkshire Police was ordered to pay Kebbie £67,500 in damages for defamation and the following year were ordered to pay a further £30,000 for wrongful arrest and false imprisonment. This came after the police emailed the Royal Marines about a letter they had received from Kebbie's estranged wife during a custody battle, subsequently arrested Kebbie and took over a year to submit a file to the Crown Prosecution Service, which immediately dropped the case due to lack of evidence.

He now runs a coaching business.

== Career statistics ==
=== Club ===
As of match played 18 June 2017

Appearances and goals by club, season and competition
Club	Season	League			National Cup		Continental		Other		Total	
Club	Season	Division	Apps	Goals	Apps	Goals	Apps	Goals	Apps	Goals	Apps	Goals
Sandefjord	2017	Eliteserien	9	0	1	0	–		–		10	0
Billericay Town	2017–18	Isthmian League Premier Division	5	0	3	0	0	0	1	0	9	0
Career total			0	0	0	0	0	0	0	0	0	0
