= Pau Morer =

Spanish footballer

Personal information
- Full name: Pau Morer Vicente
- Date of birth: 10 October 1995 (age 31)
- Place of birth: Blanes, Spain
- Height: 1.72 m (5 ft 8 in)
- Position: Midfielder

Team information
- Current team: Tona
- Number: 22

Youth career
- 1999–2004: Blanes
- 2004–2006: Espanyol
- 2006–2008: Barcelona
- 2008–2011: Girona
- 2011–2012: Calella
- 2012–2013: Damm
- 2013–2014: Swansea

Senior career*
Years	Team	Apps	(Gls)
2014–2015	Girona B	32	(9)
2015–2018	Sandefjord	76	(11)
2019	Žalgiris	24	(7)
2020	Terrassa	1	(0)
2020–2021	Lloret	8	(3)
2021–2023	Sant Andreu	43	(8)
2023	L'Escala		
2023–	Tona	30	(8)
- * Club domestic league appearances and goals as of 13 October 2024

Pau Morer Vicente (born 10 October 1995) is a Spanish professional footballer who plays for Tona.

== Club career ==
Born in Blanes, Girona, Catalonia, Morer began playing football with local CD Blanes, going on to have spells with RCD Espanyol, FC Barcelona, Girona FC, Fundaciò Calella and CF Damm.

On 9 October 2013, he signed a one-year deal with English Premier League club Swansea City to play for their U21 team. After one year with Girona FC B, on 5 August 2015 Morer signed for Norwegian Tippeligaen club Sandefjord Fotball on 18-month deal. Morer left Sandefjord at the end of the 2018 season.

In 2019 he signed for FK Žalgiris After season he left FK Žalgiris.In 2019 A lyga season he played 24 matches and scored 7 goals.

== Career statistics ==
=== Club ===
As of match played 4 November 2018

Appearances and goals by club, season and competition
Club	Season	League			National Cup		Other		Total	
Club	Season	Division	Apps	Goals	Apps	Goals	Apps	Goals	Apps	Goals
Sandefjord	2015	Tippeligaen	6	2	0	0	–		6	2
Sandefjord	2016	OBOS-ligaen	20	2	2	0	-		22	2
Sandefjord	2017	Eliteserien	26	4	2	0	–		28	4
Sandefjord	2018	Eliteserien	20	2	0	0	–		20	2
Sandefjord	Total		72	10	4	0	-	-	76	10
Career total			72	10	4	0	-	-	76	10

== Honours ==
Individual

- A Lyga Player of the Month: April 2019
