= Enric Vallès =

Spanish footballer

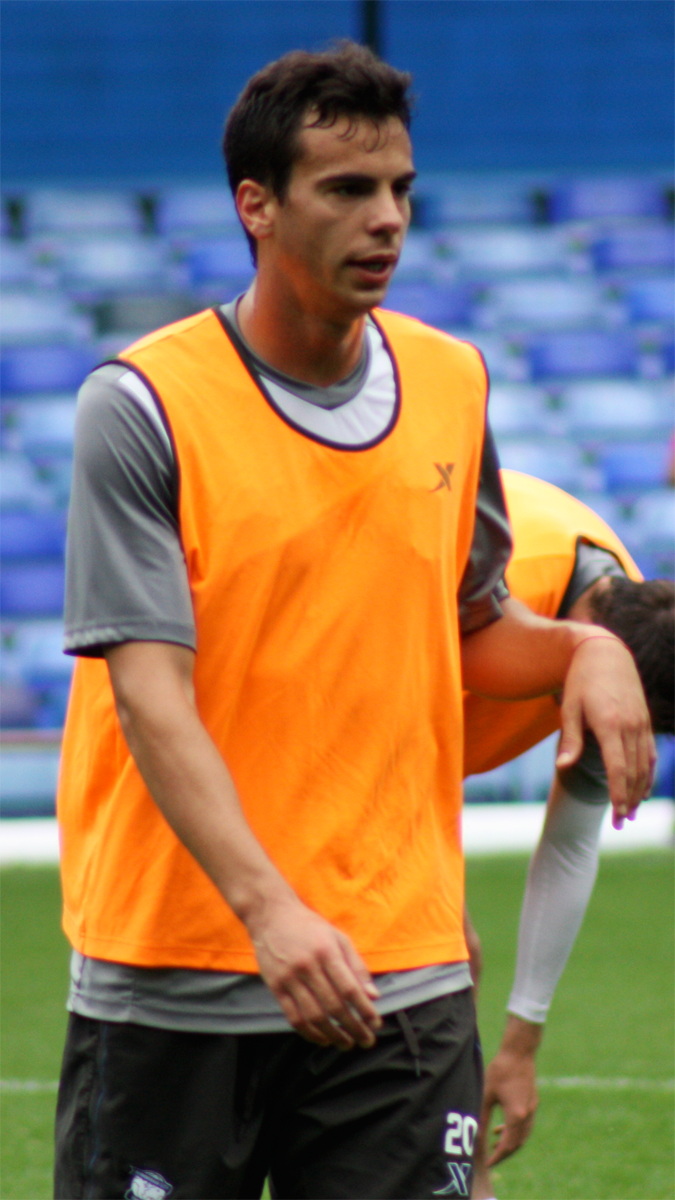
- During 2011 pre-season with Birmingham City

Personal information
- Full name: Enric Vallès Prat
- Date of birth: 1 March 1990 (age 36)
- Place of birth: Puig-reig, Spain
- Height: 1.89 m (6 ft 2 1/2 in)
- Position: Midfielder

Team information
- Current team: Girona Juvenil C (manager)

Youth career
- 1999–2008: Barcelona

Senior career*
Years	Team	Apps	(Gls)
2008–2010	NAC Breda	4	(0)
2010–2012	Birmingham City	0	(0)
2012–2013	Olot	23	(4)
2013–2014	Cornellà	17	(1)
2014–2015	Manresa	20	(5)
2015	Harrisburg City Islanders	23	(3)
2016–2021	Sandefjord	118	(8)
2021–2022	Olot	29	(4)
2022–2023	Tona	27	(2)
2023–2024	San Cristóbal	13	(0)
2024	Bosc de Tosca	6	(1)
2024	Puigreig	6	(0)

Managerial career
- 2023–2025: Gimnàstic Manresa (youth)
- 2025–: Girona (youth)
- * Club domestic league appearances and goals

Enric Vallès Prat (born 1 March 1990) is a Spanish footballer coach and former player who is the manager of the Juvenil C squad of Girona FC.

A midfielder, Vallès began his career in the youth system of FC Barcelona before playing for NAC Breda, Birmingham City, Olot, Cornellà, Manresa, Harrisburg City Islanders, Sandefjord, Tona, San Cristóbal, Bosc de Tosca, and Puigreig.

== Career ==
Born in Puig-reig, Barcelona, Catalonia, Vallès began his football career in the youth system of FC Barcelona. In 2008, he played alongside Gai Assulin and Iago Falque in the team that reached the final of the Spanish Youth Cup, in which they lost 2–0 to Sevilla's youngsters. Vallès left Barcelona in August 2008, as an 18-year-old, to turn professional with NAC Breda of the Dutch Eredivisie, signing a two-year contract.

Recommended by an agent who likened him to Albert Riera, then of Liverpool, Vallès had a week's trial with English Premier League club Birmingham City. The trial proved successful, and in May 2010, he signed a pre-contract agreement to join the club on 1 July upon the expiry of his contract with NAC Breda, for whom he had played four matches in the Eredivisie. In his first interview after joining Birmingham, Vallès described himself as a "left midfielder who can also play on the wing" whose main strengths were his dribbling and his work ethic; he also revealed his desire to play in the same team as fellow Spaniard Míchel. Manager Alex McLeish summed him up as a "big, tall, lad, left-sided and maybe not the explosion of some wingers, but a very good footballer".

After a successful pre-season, Vallès made his competitive debut for Birmingham in the second-round League Cup-tie against Rochdale on 26 August 2010. His only other appearance came in the next round of the League Cup, and a proposed loan move to League One (third-tier) club Brighton & Hove Albion or possible return to Spain came to nothing when the player suffered a stress fracture to his foot. He made a return to the first-team squad as an unused substitute for the final match of the season, which confirmed Birmingham's relegation from the Premier League, and the club took up their option to extend his contract for a further year. Vallès was occasionally included in the matchday squad during that year but made no more first-team appearances, and he was released when his contract expired at the end of the 2011–12 season.

On 15 November 2012, Vallès signed for UE Olot of the Spanish Tercera División. He scored four goals as Olot finished as champions of their group, thus qualifying for the promotion playoffs. Although Vallès suffered a hamstring injury in the second round of the playoffs that was to keep him out for what remained of the season, his team went on to defeat Arandina CF in the final round to earn promotion to the Segunda División B for the first time in the club's history.

Vallès was not kept on for the new season, and signed for another Tercera División club, UE Cornellà, in August 2013. Again, he contributed to the club's first ever promotion to the Segunda B, and again, he was released at the end of the season. Vallès then dropped down a level to the Primera Catalana to join CE Manresa for 2014–15.

Vallés signed for United Soccer League club Harrisburg City Islanders ahead of the 2015 season.

On 20 November 2015, Vallès signed a two-year contract with Norwegian First Division side Sandefjord.

He then returned to Spain, playing with Olot, Tona and San Cristóbal.

== Career statistics ==
As of match played 7 November 2020

Appearances and goals by club, season and competition
Club	Season	League			National Cup (Note: Includes appearances in KNVB Cup, FA Cup, US Open Cup, Norwegian Cup)		League Cup (Note: Includes appearances in Football League Cup)		Other		Total	
Club	Season	Division	Apps	Goals	Apps	Goals	Apps	Goals	Apps	Goals	Apps	Goals
NAC Breda	2008–09	Eredivisie	3	0	1	0	—		—		4	0
NAC Breda	2009–10	Eredivisie	1	0	0	0	—		—		1	0
NAC Breda	Total		4	0	1	0	—		—		5	0
Birmingham City	2010–11	Premier League	0	0	0	0	2	0	—		2	0
Birmingham City	2011–12	Championship	0	0	0	0	0	0	0	0	0	0
Birmingham City	Total		0	0	0	0	2	0	0	0	2	0
Olot	2012–13	Tercera División	23	4	—		—		—		23	4
Cornellà	2013–14	Tercera División	17	1	—		—		—		17	1
Manresa	2014–15	Primera Catalana	20	5	—		—		—		20	5
Harrisburg City Islanders	2015	United Soccer League	23	2	2	0	—		—		25	2
Sandefjord	2016	Norwegian First Division	17	2	0	0	—		—		17	2
Sandefjord	2017	Eliteserien	26	0	0	0	—		—		26	0
Sandefjord	2018	Eliteserien	25	2	0	0	—		—		25	2
Sandefjord	2019	Norwegian First Division	28	4	0	0	—		—		28	4
Sandefjord	2020	Eliteserien	12	0	0	0	—		—		12	0
Sandefjord	Total		108	8	0	0	—		—		108	8
Career total			195	20	3	0	2	0	0	0	200	20
