= Øystein Øvretveit =

Norwegian footballer (born 1994)

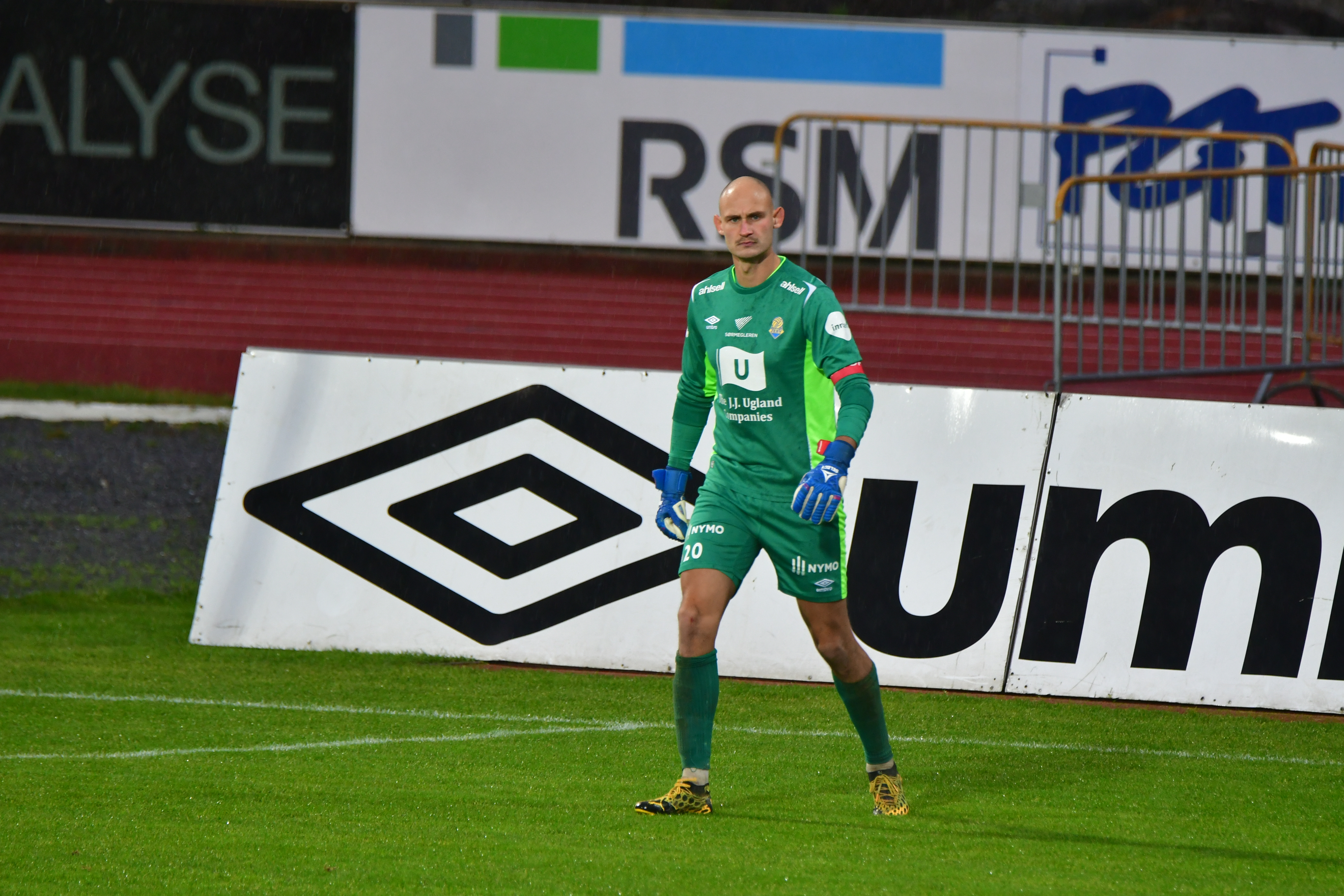
- Øvretveit with Jerv in 2020

Personal information
- Date of birth: 25 June 1994 (age 32)
- Place of birth: Bergen, Norway
- Height: 1.93 m (6 ft 4 in)
- Position: Goalkeeper

Youth career
- Telavåg
- –2008: Skogsvåg/Hald
- 2009–2011: Brann

Senior career*
Years	Team	Apps	(Gls)
2012–2015	Brann	7	(0)
2013	→ Vard Haugesund (loan)	3	(0)
2015	→ Nest-Sotra (loan)	26	(0)
2016	Nest-Sotra	26	(0)
2017	Sandefjord	1	(0)
2018–2025	Jerv	187	(0)
2025–2026	Fredrikstad	0	(0)

International career
2010	Norway U16	7	(0)
2011	Norway U17	9	(0)
2012	Norway U19	1	(0)
- * Club domestic league appearances and goals as of 29 March 2025

Øystein Øvretveit (born 25 June 1994) is a former Norwegian footballer who played as a goalkeeper.

== Club career ==
=== Early life ===
Øvretveit started his youth career at his local side Telavåg, later playing for a cooperation team of Skogsvåg and Hald. Ahead of the 2009 season, he made his big move to Brann's youth system. Øvretveit signed a professional contract with Brann on 9 February 2011, which allowed him to play in league and cup matches for the first team. A successful year with the youth team culminated in an appearance in the Norwegian under-19 Championship.

On 18 November 2011, Øvretveit was taken out of training for an indefinite period after doctors found an irregular heartbeat in routine cardiac checks. Despite being unsure of whether he had a future in football at all, he was cleared to train again by his doctors on 19 January 2012 when it was found that his problem was only temporary.

=== Senior career ===
Øvretveit's ambition ahead of the 2012 season was to establish himself as Brann 2's first-choice goalkeeper. But with the regular substitute goalkeeper Jørgen Mohus out injured, Øvretveit started the 2012 season on the bench. In the season opener against Rosenborg, injury forced Piotr Leciejewski to come off as a first-half substitute, allowing Øvretveit to come on for his professional debut. He became Brann's youngest goalkeeper in the Premier League, taking the record from his current goalkeeper-coach Dan Riisnes.

On 16 May, Leciejewski was again injured and Øvretveit replaced him in Brann's 5–0 victory against Sogndal. In the next match, he started his first league match, away against Aalesund. Although he conceding two goals, his performance was praised by Aalesund's coach Kjetil Rekdal, who stated that it wasn't Øvretveit's fault that Brann lost.

Øvretveit joined Vard Haugesund on a one-month loan-deal 14 June 2013 to get match-training, and played three matches for the club in the First Division during his spell.

Øvretveit joined Nest-Sotra on loan.

== Career statistics ==
As of match played 7 May 2025

Appearances and goals by club, season and competition
Club	Season	League			Cup		Other		Total	
Club	Season	Division	Apps	Goals	Apps	Goals	Apps	Goals	Apps	Goals
Brann	2012	Eliteserien	5	0	0	0	—		5	0
Brann	2013	Eliteserien	0	0	0	0	—		0	0
Brann	2014	Eliteserien	2	0	0	0	2 (Note: Appearances in relegation play-offs)	0	4	0
Brann	Total		7	0	0	0	2	0	9	0
Vard Haugesund (loan)	2013	1. divisjon	3	0	0	0	—		3	0
Nest-Sotra (loan)	2015	1. divisjon	26	0	1	0	—		27	0
Nest-Sotra	2016	2. divisjon	26	0	4	0	—		30	0
Sandefjord	2017	Eliteserien	1	0	2	0	—		3	0
Jerv	2018	1. divisjon	30	0	1	0	—		31	0
Jerv	2019	1. divisjon	18	0	0	0	—		18	0
Jerv	2020	1. divisjon	30	0	—		—		30	0
Jerv	2021	1. divisjon	30	0	0	0	2 (Note: Appearances in promotion play-offs)	0	32	0
Jerv	2022	Eliteserien	23	0	—		—		23	0
Jerv	2023	1. divisjon	30	0	2	0	—		32	0
Jerv	2024	2. divisjon	26	0	1	0	4 (Note: Appearances in promotion play-offs)	0	31	0
Jerv	Total		187	0	4	0	6	0	197	0
Fredrikstad	2025	Eliteserien	0	0	3	0	—		3	0
Career total			250	0	14	0	8	0	272	0
