= Dan Riisnes =

Norwegian footballer (born 1965)

Personal information
- Full name: Dan Erik Riisnes
- Date of birth: 20 May 1965 (age 61)
- Place of birth: Bergen, Norway
- Position: Goalkeeper

Senior career*
Years	Team	Apps	(Gls)
1983–1989	Brann	40	(0)

Managerial career
- 2001–: SK Brann (Goalkeeping Coach)
- * Club domestic league appearances and goals

Dan Riisnes (born 20 May 1965) is a Norwegian former football goalkeeper, which has worked as goalkeeper coach at Brann since 1999.

== Playing career ==
Riisnes made his debut for Brann as an 18-year-old, when both Stein Norstad and Geir André Johannessen was unavailable for play. In total, he played 40 matches for Brann from 1983 to 1989.

== Coaching career ==
Riisnes have since 1999 been goalkeeper coach at Brann and Norwegian youth international teams.

On a couple of occasions inn 2007 and 2008 he was on Brann's bench as their goalkeeper-reserve on the first team.
