= André Sødlund =

Norwegian footballer (born 1996)

Personal information
- Date of birth: 22 December 1996 (age 29)
- Place of birth: Växjö, Sverige
- Height: 1.82 m (6 ft 0 in)
- Position: Midfielder

Team information
- Current team: Åsgårdstrand IF

Youth career
- –2012: Sandefjord BK
- 2012–2014: Bolton Wanderers

Senior career*
Years	Team	Apps	(Gls)
2014–2018	Sandefjord	77	(9)
2015	→ Nest-Sotra (on loan)	12	(1)
2018–2019	Odd	11	(0)
2020	Sandnes Ulf	24	(1)
2021–2022	Sandefjord	14	(0)
2023	Sandefjord BK		
2024–	Åsgårdstrand IF		

International career
2014	Norway U18	8	(0)
2015	Norway U19	2	(0)
- * Club domestic league appearances and goals as of 24 April 2022

André Sødlund (born 22 January 1996) is a Norwegian footballer who plays as a midfielder for Åsgårdstrand IF in Norwegian Fourth Division. Sødlund arrived at Sandefjord ahead of the 2014 season after an unsuccessful spell at the Bolton Wanderers Academy. He has also played games for both the Norway U18 and U19 sides.

== Honours ==
=== Sandefjord ===
- Norwegian First Division: 2014
