= Facundo Rodríguez (footballer, born 1995) =

Uruguayan footballer

Personal information
- Full name: Facundo Rodríguez Calleriza
- Date of birth: 20 August 1995 (age 31)
- Place of birth: Montevideo, Uruguay
- Height: 1.86 m (6 ft 1 in)
- Position: Forward

Team information
- Current team: Boston River
- Number: 11

Youth career
- –2015: Peñarol

Senior career*
Years	Team	Apps	(Gls)
2015–2018	Peñarol	6	(0)
2015–2016	→ Sud América (loan)	18	(4)
2016–2017	→ Boston River (loan)	19	(8)
2017	→ Sandefjord (loan)	7	(2)
2018	Chacarita Juniors	4	(1)
2018–2021	Boston River	41	(12)
2022	Mineros de Zacatecas	4	(0)
2022	Macara	13	(2)
2023	Universidad César Vallejo	16	(5)
2024–	Boston River	20	(3)
- * Club domestic league appearances and goals as of 1 October 2025

Facundo Rodríguez Calleriza (born 20 August 1995) is a Uruguayan footballer who plays for Boston River.

== Career ==
=== Club ===
In August 2017, Rodríguez joined Sandefjord on loan.

== Career statistics ==
As of match played 3 November 2017

Club	Season	Division	League		Cup		Continental		Total	
Club	Season	Division	Apps	Goals	Apps	Goals	Apps	Goals	Apps	Goals
Peñarol	2015–16	Uruguayan Primera División	6	0	-		0	0	6	0
Peñarol	2016	Uruguayan Primera División	0	0	-		0	0	0	0
Peñarol	2017	Uruguayan Primera División	0	0	-		-		0	0
Peñarol	Total		6	0	-	-	0	0	6	0
Sud América (loan)	2016	Uruguayan Primera División	18	4	–		–		18	4
Boston River (loan)	2016	Uruguayan Primera División	4	0	-		-		4	0
Boston River (loan)	2017	Uruguayan Primera División	15	8	-		1	0	16	8
Boston River (loan)	Total		19	8	-	-	1	0	20	8
Sandefjord (loan)	2017	Eliteserien	7	2	0	0	–		7	2
Career total			49	14	0	0	1	0	50	14
