= Varg Støvland =

Norwegian footballer (born 1996)

Personal information
- Full name: Varg Ringdal Støvland
- Date of birth: 23 January 1996 (age 30)
- Place of birth: Larvik, Norway
- Height: 5 ft 11 in (1.80 m)
- Positions: Midfielder; defender

Team information
- Current team: Frigg
- Number: 15

Youth career
- Nanset
- –2012: Fram Larvik
- 2013–2015: Sandefjord

Senior career*
Years	Team	Apps	(Gls)
2015–2017	Sandefjord	4	(0)
2014	→ Fram Larvik (loan)	1	(0)
2017	→ Fram Larvik (loan)	3	(0)
2017	→ Halsen (loan)	10	(0)
2018	Halsen	19	(2)
2019–	Frigg		
- * Club domestic league appearances and goals as of 27 September 2018

Varg Ringdal Støvland (born 23 January 1996) is a Norwegian footballer who plays as a midfielder or defender for Frigg.

Hailing from Larvik, he started his youth career in Nanset and Fram before joining Sandefjord's youth section in 2013. He made his first-team debut in the 2014 Norwegian Football Cup in and his first-team league debut in 2015. In 2017, he was loaned out to Fram and Halsen, continuing in Halsen in 2018.

In 2019 he moved to Oslo and Frigg.
