= Flamur Kastrati =

Kosovar footballer (born 1991)

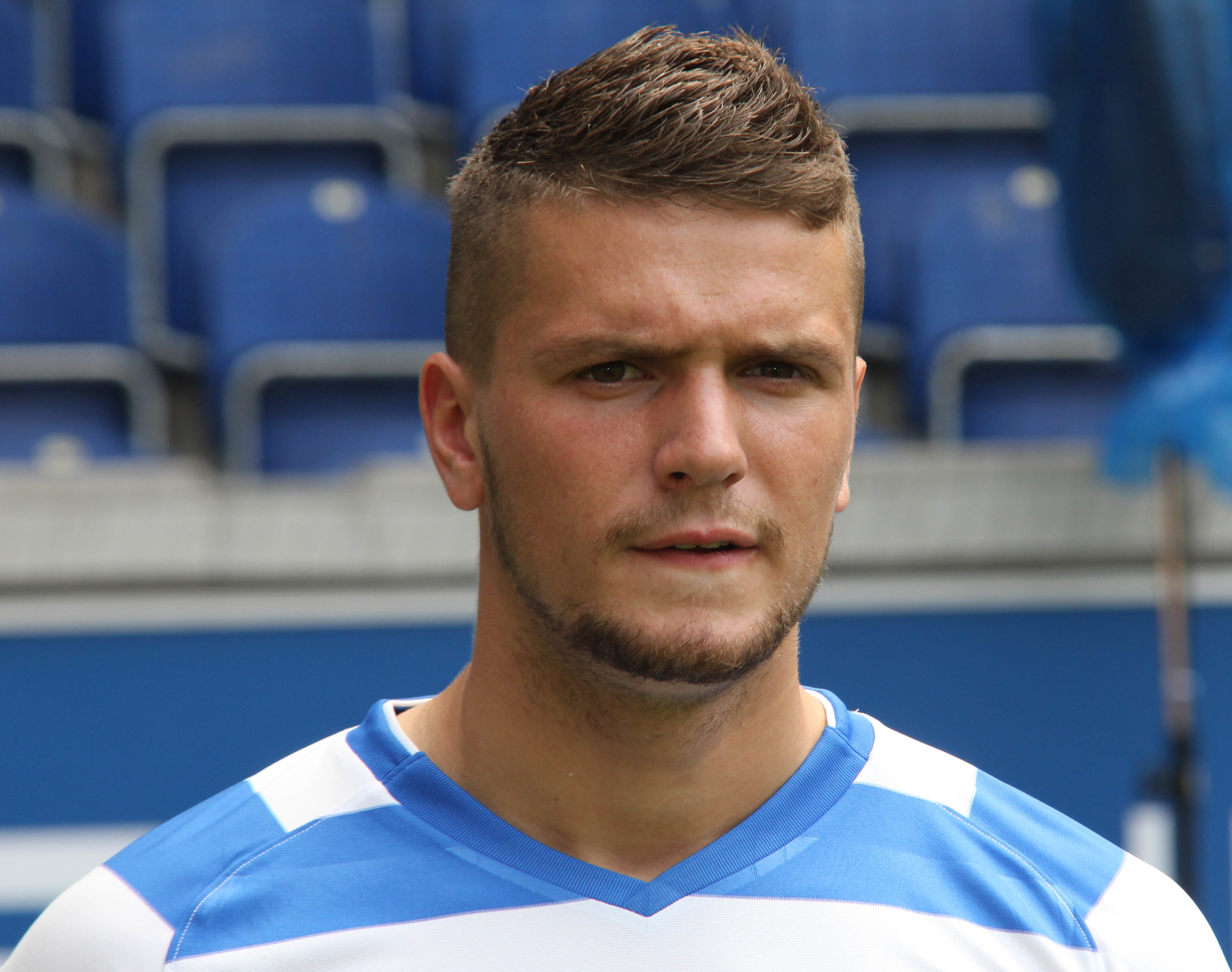
- Kastrati with MSV Duisburg in 2012.

Personal information
- Date of birth: 14 November 1991 (age 34)
- Place of birth: Oslo, Norway
- Height: 1.80 m (5 ft 11 in)

Youth career
- –2006: Grei
- 2006–2007: Skeid

Senior career*
Years	Team	Apps	(Gls)
2008	Skeid	20	(6)
2009–2011	FC Twente	0	(0)
2011	→ VfL Osnabrück (loan)	16	(4)
2011–2012	MSV Duisburg	21	(0)
2011–2012	MSV Duisburg II	3	(2)
2013	Erzgebirge Aue	10	(0)
2013–2016	Strømsgodset	61	(7)
2016	Aalesund	3	(1)
2016–2018	Sandefjord	42	(14)
2018–2021	Kristiansund	59	(8)
2021–2022	Odd	18	(0)

International career^{‡}
2009	Norway U-18	5	(1)
2010	Norway U-19	5	(3)
2011–2013	Norway U-21	10	(2)
2014–2020	Kosovo	5	(0)
- * Club domestic league appearances and goals as of 29 May 2022 ‡ National team caps and goals as of 13 January 2020

Flamur Kastrati (born 14 November 1991) is a Kosovar retired professional footballer who recently played as a forward for Eliteserien club Odd.

Kastrati is of Kosovar-Albanian descent and grew up in Norway. He has represented Norway at youth international level from under-15 to under-21 level, but has stated that he wants to represent Kosovo at international level.

Hailing from Oslo, Kastrati started his senior career in Skeid at the age of 16, before he moved to Dutch side FC Twente. After two seasons at the club's reserve team, he spent time on loan with German side VfL Osnabrück, before he joined MSV Duisburg permanently in 2011. After a brief spell at Erzgebirge Aue in 2013, Kastrati joined Strømsgodset in August 2013.

== Club career ==
Kastrati, who is of Kosovo-Albanian descent, was born in Oslo where he grew up in Groruddalen and played for Grei during his youth. He transferred to Skeid in 2006, and was at the age of 15 invited on a trial with English club Chelsea together with fellow Albanian-Norwegian youngsters Valon Berisha and Mërgim Hereqi. Kastrati made his debut for Skeid's first-team in the 2. divisjon at the age of 16, and scored six goals in the 2008 season when the team won promotion to Adeccoligaen.

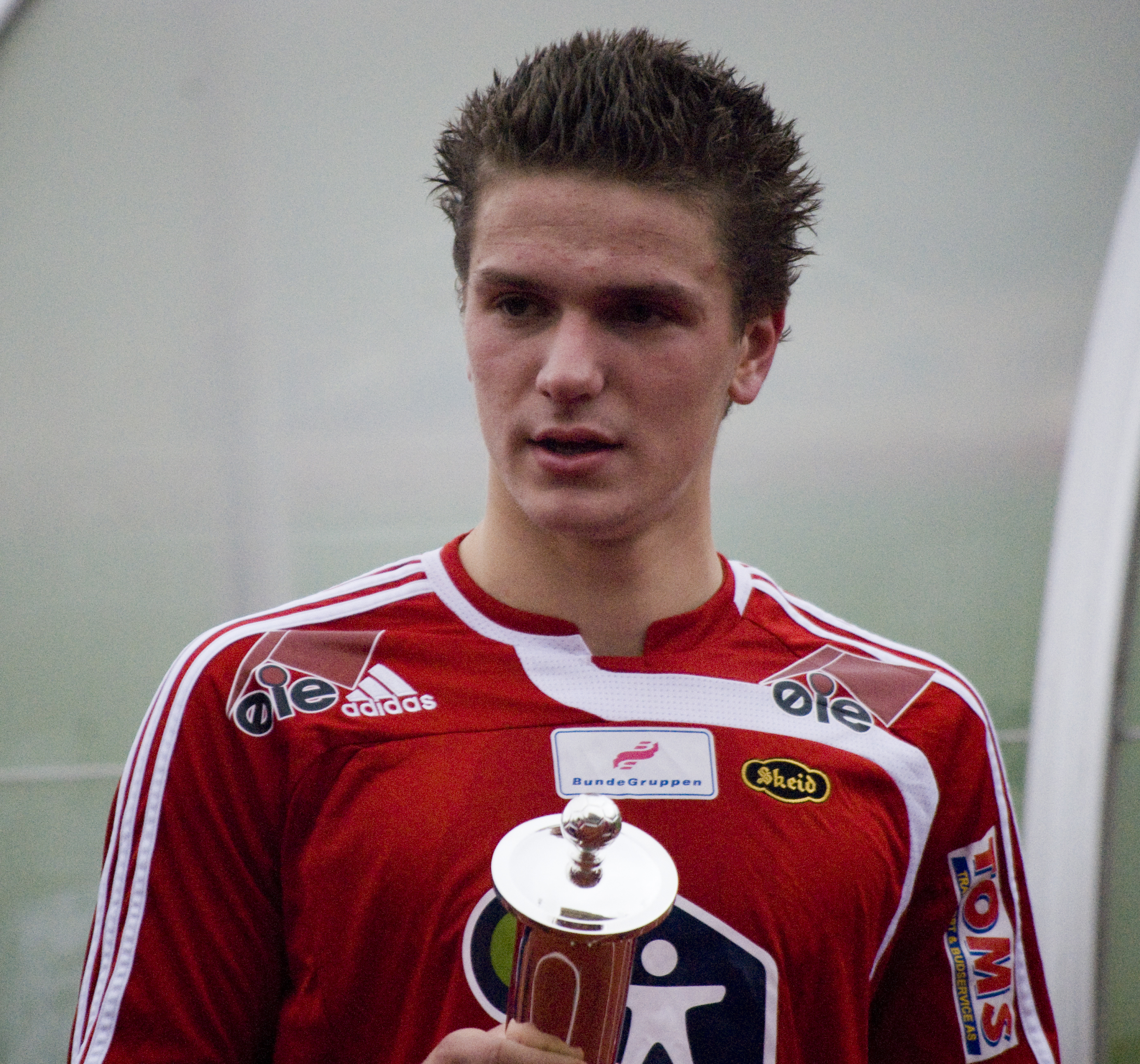
Kastrati after winning the 2008 2. Divisjon with Skeid.

The former FC Twente and Norway international player Hallvar Thoresen, Twente's head-scout in Scandinavia was impressed by Kastrati's talent in 2008, and invited the player for a trial with Twente in November 2008. Kastrati was sold to Twente in January 2009, and signed a two-year contract with the club. He was playing for the reserves team, but was one of four players that were training regularly with the first team. After Twente won the 2009–10 Eredivisie, Kastrati was played several matches with the first team in the pre-season, and was included in the squad for the Champions League match against Werder Bremen in November 2011

Kastrati was loaned out to German 2. Bundesliga side VfL Osnabrück on loan for the second half of the 2011–12 season. He scored in his debut in the 1–4 loss against MSV Duisburg on 16 January 2011. In a match against Energie Cottbus on 13 March 2011, Kastrati fell to the ground unconscious after an apparently harmless clash with Markus Brzenska. The match was stopped while Kastrati received treatment on the pitch, before he was taken to the hospital by an ambulance. After the match was restarted, both teams stopped playing, simply passing the ball from side to side during the 12 minutes of stoppage time. The doctors feared that Kastrati's neck was broken, and that his footballing career was over. He did however only injure a nerve, and was expected to return to the pitch within two weeks. He scored a goal in his first match after the injury, against Karlsruher SC on 1 April 2011.

VfL Osnabrück was relegated from the 2011–12 2. Bundesliga and Kastrati joined MSV Duisburg in June 2011 on a free transfer, where he signed a three-year contract. Kastrati joined Erzgebirge Aue on a free transfer in January 2013 and signed a contract lasting till June 2015 and was given shirt number 9. Kastrati struggled to become a regular in Erzgebirge Aue's first team, and in August 2013 he signed a three-and-a-half-year contract with the Tippeligaen side Strømsgodset. Kastrati stated that he was wanted by other Norwegian clubs, but that he wanted to join Godset because he considered Ronny Deila the best head coach in Norway. Kastrati made his debut for Strømsgodset in the Tippeligaen match against title contenders Rosenborg on 11 August 2013. He played 11 minutes in the 2–2 draw, and could have become match-winner two minutes into stoppage time, but his goal was disallowed for offside.

In August 2016 Kastrati joined Aalesunds FK, a few months before his contract with Strømsgodset would have expired.

In August 2018 Kastrati joined Kristiansund.

In August 2021, Kastrati joined Odd.

== International career ==
Kastrati first represented Norway in 2007 when he played three matches for the under-16 team. He played five matches and scored for the under-17 team in 2008, before he the next year scored one goal in five matches for the under-18. He became a regular for the under-19 team in 2010 and scored three goals in five matches for the team.

Kastrati made his debut for Norwegian under-21 team in the match against Greece U-21 on 17 November 2010 In the first match of the 2013 UEFA European Under-21 Football Championship qualification, Kastrati assisted Joshua King's goal when Norway U-21 won 2–0 against Iceland U-21. He made a total of three appearances for the under-21 team in the qualification campaign, when they qualified for the 2013 UEFA European Under-21 Football Championship. Kastrati scored his first goal for the under-21 in a friendly match against Spain U-21 on 21 March 2013, and scored another goal against Netherlands U-21 four days later. Kastrati was a part of the Norwegian squad that won bronze at the 2013 UEFA European Under-21 Football Championship, where he made one appearance as a substitute.

In April 2013, Kastrati told the Albanian media that he would welcome a call from Albania to play for them. In February 2014, Kastrati announced that he would play for Kosovo.

== Career statistics ==
=== Club ===
As of match played 16 May 2022

Appearances and goals by club, season and competition
Club	Season	League			National cup		Continental		Other		Total	
Club	Season	Division	Apps	Goals	Apps	Goals	Apps	Goals	Apps	Goals	Apps	Goals
VfL Osnabrück (loan)	2010–11	2. Bundesliga	16	4	0	0	–		–		16	4
MSV Duisburg	2011–12	2. Bundesliga	18	0	2	0	–		–		20	0
MSV Duisburg	2012–13	2. Bundesliga	3	0	1	0	–		–		4	0
MSV Duisburg	Total		21	0	3	0	0	0	0	0	24	0
Erzgebirge Aue	2012–13	2. Bundesliga	10	0	0	0	–		–		10	0
Strømsgodset	2013	Tippeligaen	11	1	0	0	–		–		11	1
Strømsgodset	2014	Tippeligaen	18	2	1	0	2	0	–		21	2
Strømsgodset	2015	Tippeligaen	21	2	2	0	6	0	–		29	2
Strømsgodset	2016	Tippeligaen	11	2	3	0	2	0	–		16	2
Strømsgodset	Total		61	7	8	0	10	0	0	0	79	7
Aalesund	2016	Tippeligaen	3	1	0	0	–		–		3	1
Sandefjord	2017	Eliteserien	26	10	1	0	–		–		27	10
Sandefjord	2018	Eliteserien	16	4	2	2	–		–		18	6
Sandefjord	Total		42	14	3	2	0	0	0	0	45	16
Kristiansund	2018	Eliteserien	8	4	0	0	–		–		8	4
Kristiansund	2019	Eliteserien	19	4	2	1	–		–		21	5
Kristiansund	2020	Eliteserien	23	0	0	0	–		–		23	0
Kristiansund	2021	Eliteserien	9	0	0	0	–		–		9	0
Kristiansund	Total		59	8	2	1	0	0	0	0	55	9
Odd	2021	Eliteserien	13	0	0	0	–		–		13	0
Odd	2022	Eliteserien	5	0	2	1	–		–		7	1
Odd	Total		18	0	2	1	0	0	0	0	20	1
Career total			230	34	16	4	10	0	0	0	256	38

== Honours ==
Strømsgodset

- Tippeligaen: 2013
