= Håvard Storbæk =

Norwegian footballer (born 1986)

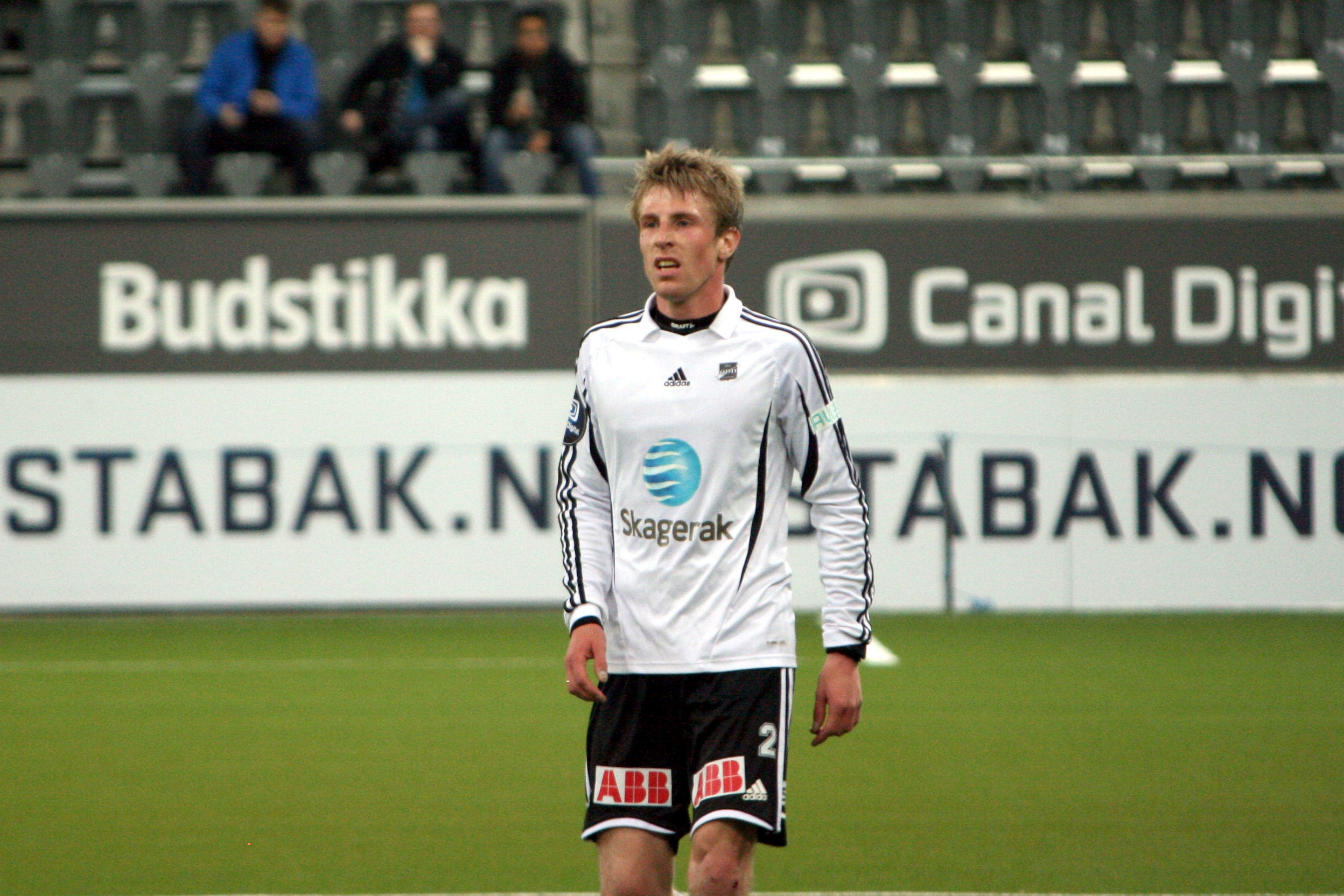

Personal information
- Date of birth: 25 May 1986 (age 40)
- Place of birth: Elverum, Norway
- Height: 1.79 m (5 ft 10 1/2 in)
- Position: Midfielder

Team information
- Current team: Storms
- Number: 10

Senior career*
Years	Team	Apps	(Gls)
- Østre Trysil
- Trysil
2007–2008	Nybergsund	50	(23)
2009–2011	Odd Grenland	81	(11)
2012–2013	Haugesund	23	(2)
2013–2015	Odd	81	(10)
2016–2019	Sandefjord	106	(18)
2020–	Storms		

International career
2004	Norway U18	2	(1)
- * Club domestic league appearances and goals

Håvard Storbæk (born 25 May 1986) is a Norwegian football midfielder who plays for Storms BK.

He announced at the end of 2019, that he was retiring from professional football. He has previously played for Nybergsund, FK Haugesund and Odd. He is the second cousin of Jarl-André Storbæk.

== Career ==
Storbæk was born in Elverum and grew up in Ljørdalen in Trysil Municipality, near the Swedish border, and played football for Østre Trysil and Trysil before he joined Nybergsund IL-Trysil, where he played for five seasons. In his first season for Nybergsund IL-Trysil he played 25 matches and scored 16 goals.

In his second season for Nybergsund IL, Storbæk played 25 matches and scored 7 goals in the First Division. Odd Grenland's head coach Dag-Eilev Fagermo wanted to sign Storbæk after his performance in the match between Nybergsund and Odd Grenland on 29 June 2008, where Storbæk scored a goal. Storbæk rejected offers from HamKam and Strømsgodset and signed a two-year contract with Odd Grenland on 14 July 2008, and joined the club who had won promotion to Tippeligaen after the season.

Storbæk's first match for Odd Grenland was a friendly match against Lyn on 23 January 2009 that ended in a 1–1 draw, he was in the starting line-up but was substituted after 73 minutes for Magnus Lekven. Storbæk made his debut in Tippeligaen in Odd Grenland's first match of the 2009 season, he came on as a substitute for Simen Brenne after 87 minutes when Odd lost 3–0 against Viking. In the team's first home game of the season, Storbæk scored the 2–0 goal against Sandefjord.

Storbæk did not want to sign a new contract with Odd Grenland, and could leave the club after the 2011-season as a free agent. In October 2011, FK Haugesund announced that they had signed a three-year contract with Storbæk starting from January 2012.

On 20 March 2020 it was confirmed, that Samuelsen had joined Storms BK together with his former Odd-teammate Jone Samuelsen.

== Career statistics ==
=== Club ===
As of match played 27 October 2019

Appearances and goals by club, season and competition
Club	Season	League			National Cup		Europe		Total	
Club	Season	Division	Apps	Goals	Apps	Goals	Apps	Goals	Apps	Goals
Nybergsund	2007	2. divisjon	25	16	4	2	-		29	18
Nybergsund	2008	1. divisjon	25	7	0	0	-		25	7
Nybergsund	Total		50	23	4	2	-	-	54	25
Odd	2009	Eliteserien	27	2	5	0	-		32	2
Odd	2010	Eliteserien	29	2	6	3	-		35	5
Odd	2011	Eliteserien	25	7	3	0	-		28	7
Odd	Total		81	11	14	3	-	-	95	14
Haugesund	2012	Eliteserien	22	2	5	2	-		27	4
Haugesund	2013	Eliteserien	1	0	0	0	-		1	0
Haugesund	Total		23	2	5	2	-	-	28	4
Odd	2013	Eliteserien	28	5	3	1	-		31	6
Odd	2014	Eliteserien	27	4	6	1	-		33	5
Odd	2015	Eliteserien	26	1	5	3	3	0	34	4
Odd	Total		81	10	14	5	3	0	98	15
Sandefjord	2016	1. divisjon	26	4	4	1	-		30	5
Sandefjord	2017	Eliteserien	27	3	1	0	-		28	3
Sandefjord	2018	Eliteserien	27	4	2	0	-		29	4
Sandefjord	2019	1. divisjon	26	7	3	0	-		29	7
Sandefjord	Total		106	18	10	1	-	-	116	19
Career total			341	64	47	13	3	0	391	77
