= Victor Demba Bindia =

Senegalese footballer

Personal information
- Date of birth: 6 August 1989 (age 37)
- Place of birth: Boutoupa, Senegal
- Height: 1.68 m (5 ft 6 in)
- Position: Right back

Team information
- Current team: Al-Wehdat
- Number: 14

Youth career
- Casa Sports

Senior career*
Years	Team	Apps	(Gls)
2008–2018	Sandefjord	243	(4)
2019–	Al-Wehdat		

International career
2012	Senegal	1	(0)
- * Club domestic league appearances and goals as of 1 September 2018

Victor Demba Bindia (born 6 August 1989) is a Senegalese footballer who plays for Al-Wehdat.

== Career ==
He made his debut for Sandefjord versus Molde in the Tippeligaen in April 2009.

In July 2012, he was called into the Senegal squad for the 2012 Summer Olympics. However, he was injured in a friendly match ahead of the opening match against Great Britain, resulting in Bindia missing the whole tournament.

Bindia signed for Al-Wehdat in Jordan on 14 January 2019.

== Career statistics ==
Season	Club	Division	League		Cup		Total	
Season	Club	Division	Apps	Goals	Apps	Goals	Apps	Goals
2008	Sandefjord	Adeccoligaen	1	0	0	0	1	0
2009	Sandefjord	Tippeligaen	12	0	2	0	14	0
2010	Sandefjord	Tippeligaen	29	1	4	1	33	2
2011	Sandefjord	Adeccoligaen	24	0	2	0	26	0
2012	Sandefjord	Adeccoligaen	22	1	4	0	26	1
2013	Sandefjord	Adeccoligaen	28	0	2	0	30	0
2014	Sandefjord	1. divisjon	27	1	2	0	29	1
2015	Sandefjord	Tippeligaen	29	1	5	0	34	1
2016	Sandefjord	OBOS-ligaen	29	0	3	0	32	0
2017	Sandefjord	Eliteserien	27	0	0	0	27	0
2018	Sandefjord	Eliteserien	15	0	0	0	15	0
Career Total			243	4	24	1	267	5
