= Carlos Grossmüller =

Uruguayan footballer (born 1983)

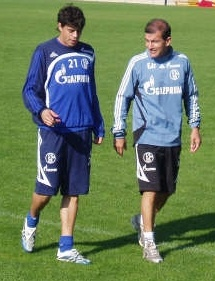
- Carlos Grossmüller (left)

Personal information
- Full name: Carlos Javier Grossmüller
- Date of birth: 4 May 1983 (age 43)
- Place of birth: Montevideo, Uruguay
- Height: 1.81 m (5 ft 11 in)
- Position: Midfielder

Youth career
- 1988–1996: Ombu

Senior career*
Years	Team	Apps	(Gls)
2002–2007	Danubio	90	(21)
2004	→ Fénix (loan)	6	(0)
2007–2010	Schalke 04	13	(1)
2008–2009	→ Schalke 04 II (loan)	14	(1)
2009–2010	→ Danubio (loan)	23	(5)
2010–2012	Lecce	37	(3)
2012–2013	Peñarol	15	(0)
2013–2014	Cerro	29	(4)
2015–2017	Universitario de Deportes	16	(3)
2017	→ Sandefjord (loan)	12	(3)
2018–2020	Danubio	62	(16)
2021–2022	San Lorenzo de San José		

International career
2003–2006	Uruguay	4	(0)

Managerial career
- 2023: Bella Vista
- * Club domestic league appearances and goals

Carlos Javier Grossmüller (born 4 May 1983) is a Uruguayan football manager and former player who played as a midfielder.

== Career ==
Born in Montevideo, Uruguay, Grossmüller began his footballing career in 1988, at the age of five, as a youth player with his local team, Ombu.

In 2002, he made his professional debut for Primera División Uruguaya side Danubio, making mostly substitute appearances for the next two seasons, but being part of the 2004 championship team.

In 2004, he was sent on loan to Centro Atlético Fénix to gain experience, where he made six appearances in the Segunda División Uruguay before going back to Danubio. During the next two seasons at Danubio, he went on to play 52 league games, netted 13 goals, and won two more titles, (2006 Apertura, 2007 Clausura) which prompted interest from German side Schalke 04. Schalke later signed him in the summer of 2007 on a four-year contract.

His first goal in the Bundesliga, a free kick against Werder Bremen, went on to be nominated as "Goal of the Month" in German television. On 31 August 2009, he returned to his former club Danubio on loan until 30 June 2010. On 30 July 2010, he was signed by newly promoted Serie A side Lecce. After Lecce were relegated at the end of the 2011–12 season, he returned to Uruguay and joined Peñarol on 22 August 2012.

In 2013, he joined Cerro and played with them until 2014.

He made another return to Danubio in 2018 and left the club in 2020.

== International career ==
He made his début with the Uruguay national team against Mexico in 2003.
