= Christer Reppesgård Hansen =

Norwegian footballer (born 1993)

Personal information
- Date of birth: 29 March 1993 (age 33)
- Place of birth: Larvik, Norway
- Height: 1.86 m (6 ft 1 in)
- Position: Centre back

Team information
- Current team: Eik Tønsberg
- Number: 12

Youth career
- Hedrum
- 2010–2011: Sandefjord

Senior career*
Years	Team	Apps	(Gls)
2011–2019	Sandefjord	164	(0)
2019–2020	Sandnes Ulf	31	(1)
2021–2022	Arendal	12	(0)
2023	Halsen IF	3	(0)
2024–	Eik Tønsberg	4	(0)
- * Club domestic league appearances and goals as of 25 JUly 2025

Christer Reppesgård Hansen (born 29 March 1993) is a Norwegian football defender who plays for Eik Tønsberg in the Norwegian Second Division.

He started his career in Hedrum IL, and joined the region's largest team Sandefjord as a junior in 2010. After playing one first-team game in 2011, he was drafted into the senior squad in 2012.

== Career statistics ==
=== Club ===
As of match played 13 December 2020

Appearances and goals by club, season and competition
Club	Season	League			National Cup		Europe		Total	
Club	Season	Division	Apps	Goals	Apps	Goals	Apps	Goals	Apps	Goals
Sandefjord	2011	1. divisjon	1	0	0	0	-		1	0
Sandefjord	2012	1. divisjon	18	0	4	1	-		22	1
Sandefjord	2013	1. divisjon	13	0	1	0	-		14	0
Sandefjord	2014	1. divisjon	25	0	2	0	-		27	0
Sandefjord	2015	Eliteserien	18	0	3	0	-		21	0
Sandefjord	2016	1. divisjon	28	0	5	0	-		33	0
Sandefjord	2017	Eliteserien	29	0	0	0	-		29	0
Sandefjord	2018	Eliteserien	29	0	1	0	-		30	0
Sandefjord	2019	1. divisjon	3	0	1	0	-		4	0
Sandefjord	Total		164	0	17	1	-	-	181	1
Sandnes Ulf	2019	1. divisjon	6	0	0	0	-		6	0
Sandnes Ulf	2020	1. divisjon	25	1	-		-		25	1
Sandnes Ulf	Total		31	1	0	0	-	-	31	1
Career total			195	1	17	1	-	-	212	2
