= El-Hadji Gana Kane =

Senegalese footballer

Personal information
- Full name: El-Hadji Gana Kane
- Date of birth: 11 April 1995 (age 31)
- Place of birth: Dakar, Senegal
- Height: 1.89 m (6 ft 2 in)
- Position: Centre-back

Team information
- Current team: KPV
- Number: 33

Youth career
- 2002—2014: Mallorca

Senior career*
Years	Team	Apps	(Gls)
2014–2015	Binissalem	30	(1)
2015–2016	Ferriolense	19	(6)
2016	SJK	8	(0)
2017–2018	Sandefjord	29	(1)
2019–	KPV	5	(0)
- * Club domestic league appearances and goals as of 23:45, 13 June 2019 (UTC)

El-Hadji Gana Kane (born 11 April 1995) is a Senegalese professional footballer who plays as a defender for KPV.

== Career ==
Kane played in RCD Mallorca's academy between 2002 and 2014.

On 22 February 2016, Kane signed a one-year contract with Finnish Veikkausliiga side SJK.

Kane is represented by ExtraTime Sport Uk.

== Transfer Fee Incident ==
In 2018 SJK received an unexpected bill of €80,000 in FIFA training compensation after Kane had appeared in 8 matches for the club. Under FIFA regulations, training compensation is payable to a player's former youth clubs upon signing their first professional contract. SJK management stated that they had been informed of a lower monthly salary that what was registered in official FIFA records, leading them to miscalculate the required training compensation. SJK subsequently paid the fee and publicly advocated for greater transperacy in player transfer practices.
