= 2016 FK Bodø/Glimt season =

Bodø/Glimt
2016 season
- President: Mads Torrissen
- Manager: Bjørn-Tore Hansen
- Stadium: Aspmyra Stadion
- Tippeligaen: 15th
- Norwegian Cup: Semi-final vs Rosenborg
- Top goalscorer: League: Fitim Azemi (11); All: Fitim Azemi (14)
- Highest home attendance: 7,564 vs Brann (18 September 2016)
- Lowest home attendance: 942 vs Haugesund (25 May 2016)
- Average home league attendance: 3,378 (30 October 2016)
Home colours	Away colours

The 2016 season was Bodø/Glimt's third, and final, season back in the Tippeligaen since their relegation at the end of the 2009 season. Bodø/Glimt finished the season in 15th position, dropping back down into OBOS-ligaen, whilst in the Norwegian Cup, they reached the Semi-finals before defeat to Rosenborg.

== Squad ==
As of match played 6 November 2016

No.	Name	Nationality	Position	Date of birth (age)	Signed from	Signed in	Contract ends	Apps.	Goals
Goalkeepers
1	Simon Thomas	(Canada)	GK	12 April 1990 (aged 26)	Strømmen	2016		13	0
12	Jonas Ueland Kolstad	(Norway)	GK	21 September 1976 (aged 40)	Årvoll	2002		81	0
23	Serhiy Pohorilyy	(Ukraine)	GK	26 July 1986 (aged 30)	Metalist Kharkiv	2016		7	0
Defenders
2	Ruben Imingen	(Norway)	DF	4 December 1986 (aged 29)	Fauske/Sprint	2005		184	3
3	Emil Jonassen	(Norway)	DF	17 February 1993 (aged 23)	Odd	2016		26	1
4	Martin Bjørnbak	(Norway)	DF	22 March 1992 (aged 24)	Haugesund	2016		61	3
6	Sascha Mockenhaupt	(Germany)	DF	10 September 1991 (aged 25)	loan from 1. FC Kaiserslautern	2016	2016	12	1
18	Brede Moe	(Norway)	DF	15 December 1991 (aged 24)	Rosenborg	2015		78	6
21	Daniel Edvardsen	(Norway)	DF	31 August 1991 (aged 25)	Harstad	2014		42	0
24	Fredrik André Bjørkan	(Norway)	DF	21 August 1998 (aged 18)	Youth team	2016		12	0
29	Vebjørn Vinje	(Norway)	DF	7 April 1995 (aged 21)	Mo	2014		4	0
Midfielders
5	Thomas Jacobsen	(Norway)	MF	16 September 1983 (aged 33)	Lyn	2010		253	5
8	Ole Jørgen Halvorsen	(Norway)	MF	2 October 1987 (aged 29)	loan from Odd	2016	2016	12	4
9	Alexander Jakobsen	(Egypt)	MF	18 March 1994 (aged 22)	Falkenbergs FF	2016		12	0
10	Ruslan Babenko	(Ukraine)	MF	8 July 1992 (aged 24)	Stal Dniprodzerzhynsk	2016		23	0
14	Ulrik Saltnes	(Norway)	MF	10 November 1992 (aged 23)	Brønnøysund	2011		86	6
16	Morten Konradsen	(Norway)	MF	3 May 1996 (aged 20)	Youth team	2012		75	9
17	Mathias Normann	(Norway)	MF	28 May 1996 (aged 20)	Lofoten	2012		34	3
27	Patrick Berg	(Norway)	MF	24 November 1997 (aged 18)	Youth team	2014		29	2
Forwards
10	Fitim Azemi	(Norway)	FW	25 June 1992 (aged 24)	Follo	2015		68	20
19	Joachim Osvold	(Norway)	FW	23 September 1994 (aged 22)	Rot-Weiss Essen	2016		2	1
22	Vadim Manzon	(Russia)	FW	5 December 1994 (aged 21)	loan from Karlsruher SC	2016	2016	12	3
28	William Arne Hanssen	(Norway)	FW	10 May 1998 (aged 18)	Youth team	2016		2	0
30	Trond Olsen	(Norway)	FW	5 February 1984 (aged 32)	Viking	2014		282	81
31	Jens Petter Hauge	(Norway)	FW	12 October 1999 (aged 17)	Youth team	2016		24	5
Out on loan
Players who left club during season
6	Anders Karlsen	(Norway)	MF	15 February 1990 (aged 26)	Youth team	2006		109	7
8	Henrik Furebotn	(Norway)	MF	11 February 1986 (aged 30)	Sandnes Ulf	2015		47	7
9	Martin Wiig	(Norway)	FW	22 August 1983 (aged 33)	Sarpsborg 08	2016		8	2
11	Milan Jevtović	(Serbia)	FW	13 June 1993 (aged 23)	loan from LASK	2016	2016	23	8
22	Martin Pedersen	(Norway)	DF	14 January 1995 (aged 21)	Youth team	2012		1	0
25	Hannes Þór Halldórsson	(Iceland)	GK	27 April 1984 (aged 32)	loan from NEC	2016	2016	16	0

== Transfers ==
=== In ===
Date	Position	Nationality	Name	From	Fee	Ref.
21 November 2015	GK	(Canada)	Simon Thomas	Strømmen	Undisclosed	
24 November 2015	DF	(Norway)	Martin Bjørnbak	Haugesund	Undisclosed	
8 December 2015	DF	(Norway)	Emil Jonassen	Odd	Undisclosed	
7 January 2016	FW	(Norway)	Martin Wiig		Free	
3 February 2016	FW	(Norway)	William Arne Hanssen	Promoted		
8 February 2016	MF	(Ukraine)	Ruslan Babenko	Stal Dniprodzerzhynsk	Undisclosed	
21 July 2016	GK	(Ukraine)	Serhiy Pohorilyy	Metalist Kharkiv	Undisclosed	
29 July 2016	FW	(Norway)	Joachim Osvold	Rot-Weiss Essen	Undisclosed	
17 August 2016	MF	(Egypt)	Alexander Jakobsen	Falkenberg	Free	

=== Loans in ===
Date from	Position	Nationality	Name	From	Date to	Ref.
7 January 2016	FW	(Serbia)	Milan Jevtović	LASK	19 August 2016	
11 March 2016	GK	(Iceland)	Hannes Þór Halldórsson	NEC	18 July 2016	
16 August 2016	DF	(Germany)	Sascha Mockenhaupt	1. FC Kaiserslautern	End of season	
17 August 2016	MF	(Norway)	Ole Jørgen Halvorsen	Odd	End of season	
17 August 2016	FW	(Russia)	Vadim Manzon	Karlsruher SC	End of season	

=== Out ===
Date	Position	Nationality	Name	To	Fee	Ref.
12 January 2016	DF	(United States)	Zarek Valentin	Portland Timbers	Undisclosed	
19 July 2016	FW	(Norway)	Henrik Furebotn	Sogndal	Undisclosed	
17 August 2016	FW	(Norway)	Martin Wiig	KFUM Oslo	Undisclosed	

=== Loans out ===
Date from	Position	Nationality	Name	To	Date to	Ref.
1 April 2016	DF	(Norway)	Vebjørn Vinje	Mo	End of season	

=== Released ===
Date	Position	Nationality	Name	Joined	Date
18 July 2016	MF	(Norway)	Anders Karlsen	Retired	
31 December 2016	GK	(Ukraine)	Serhiy Pohorilyy	Helios Kharkiv	5 February 2018
31 December 2016	DF	(Germany)	Sascha Mockenhaupt	Wehen Wiesbaden	4 January 2017
31 December 2016	DF	(Norway)	Ruben Imingen	Retired	
11 November 2016	MF	(Ukraine)	Ruslan Babenko	Zorya Luhansk	19 January 2017

== Friendlies ==
22 January 2016	Stålkameratene	0–3	Bodø/Glimt	Mo i Rana
18:00 CET (UTC+1)		Report	Hanssen 65'; Normann 81'; Jevtović 86'	Stadium: Sagbakken

29 January 2016	Bodø/Glimt	2–0	Start	Bodø
19:00 CET (UTC+1)	Azemi 42'; Hanssen 72'	Report		Stadium: Aspmyra Stadion

5 February 2016	Bodø/Glimt	0–1	Tromsø	Bodø
18:00 CET (UTC+1)		Report	Ingebrigtsen 13'	Stadium: Aspmyra Stadion

18 February 2016	Bodø/Glimt (Norway)	5–1	(Spain) Cartagena	La Manga, Spain
15:00 CET (UTC+1)	Azemi 3', 7', 25', 26'; Jevtović 14'; Normann (yellow card) 66'	Report	García 74'

22 February 2016	Bodø/Glimt	0–0	Mjøndalen	La Manga, Spain
19:00 CET (UTC+1)		Report

29 February 2016	Bodø/Glimt	0–1	Lillestrøm	Bodø
16:30 CET (UTC+1)	Babenko (yellow card) 45'	Report	Friday (yellow card) 33', (goal) 51'	Stadium: Aspmyra Stadion

3 March 2016	Bodø/Glimt	5–0	Mo	Bodø
18:30 CET (UTC+1)	Karlsen 47'; Bjørnbak 51'; Olsen 54'; Azemi 67'; Vinje 82'	Report		Stadium: Aspmyra Stadion

6 March 2016	Sarpsborg 08	4–0	Bodø/Glimt	Sarpsborg
18:00 CET (UTC+1)	Groven 25'; Jónsson (yellow card) 45'; Lindberg 66'; Lund Nielsen 71'; Mbedule 82'	Report	Babenko (yellow card) 63'	Stadium: Sarpsborg Stadion

== Competitions ==
=== Tippeligaen ===
==== Results summary ====
Overall								Home						Away					
Pld	W	D	L	GF	GA	GD	Pts	W	D	L	GF	GA	GD	W	D	L	GF	GA	GD
30	8	6	16	36	45	−9	30	5	3	7	19	22	−3	3	3	9	17	23	−6

Last updated: 7 November 2016.
Source: see below

==== Results by round ====
Round	1	2	3	4	5	6	7	8	9	10	11	12	13	14	15	16	17	18	19	20	21	22	23	24	25	26	27	28	29	30
Ground	H	A	H	A	H	H	A	H	A	H	A	H	A	H	A	H	A	H	A	H	A	H	A	H	A	H	A	A	H	A
Result	W	D	W	L	L	L	L	L	L	D	W	L	L	D	W	W	D	L	L	D	D	W	W	L	L	W	L	L	L	L
Position	1	2	1	5	6	9	12	14	14	14	14	14	14	13	12	10	11	12	13	13	13	11	11	12	14	12	12	13	14	15

Updated to match(es) played on 7 November 2016. Source: see below
A = Away; H = Home; W = Win; D = Draw; L = Loss

==== Results ====
13 March 2016 1	Bodø/Glimt	2–0	Sogndal	Bodø
18:00 CET (UTC+1)	Jonassen 42'; Jevtović 86'	Report		Stadium: Aspmyra Stadion; Attendance: 2,398; Referee: Dag Vidar Hafsås

20 March 2016 2	Lillestrøm	1–1	Bodø/Glimt	Kjeller
18:00 CET (UTC+1)	Martin (yellow card) 15' (goal) 83'; Innocent (yellow card) 65'	Report	Jevtović 12'; Babenko (yellow card) 82'	Stadium: Åråsen Stadion; Attendance: 4,761; Referee: Martin Lundby

3 April 2016 3	Bodø/Glimt	3–1	Stabæk	Bodø
18:00 CEST (UTC+2)	Azemi 32'; Jevtović 64'; Bjørnbak 72'	Report	Davey (yellow card) 40'; Skjønsberg (yellow card) 71'; Omoijuanfo 86'	Stadium: Aspmyra Stadion; Attendance: 2,980; Referee: Tommy Skjerven

10 April 2016 4	Brann	1–0	Bodø/Glimt	Bergen
15:30 CEST (UTC+2)	Orlov 9'	Report		Stadium: Brann Stadion; Attendance: 11,886; Referee: Ola Hobber Nilsen

17 April 2016 5	Bodø/Glimt	1–2	Molde	Bodø
15:30 CEST (UTC+2)	Furebotn 1'; Babenko (yellow card) 65'	Report	Amang 47'; Flo 52'; Singh (yellow card) 70' (yellow-red card) 86'; Hestad (yellow card) 85'	Stadium: Aspmyra Stadion; Attendance: 3,407; Referee: Tore Hansen

21 April 2016 6	Bodø/Glimt	3–4	Haugesund	Bodø
19:00 CEST (UTC+2)	Olsen 19'; Azemi 45+1', 59' (pen.) (penalty missed) 64'; Normann (yellow card) 81'	Report	Agdestein 12', 21'; Bråtveit (yellow card) 64'; Mensah (yellow card) 68'; Kiss 77' (pen.); Stølås 90+2'	Stadium: Aspmyra Stadion; Attendance: 2,867; Referee: Trygve Kjensli

23 April 2016 7	Strømsgodset	2–0	Bodø/Glimt	Drammen
15:30 CEST (UTC+2)	Pedersen 2' (pen.); Júnior (yellow card) 29'; Abu (yellow card) 73'; Storflor (yellow card) 73'; Kastrati 76'	Report	Jacobsen (yellow card) 1'; Normann (yellow card) 66'	Stadium: Marienlyst Stadion; Attendance: 6,816; Referee: Svein-Erik Edvartsen

2 May 2016 8	Bodø/Glimt	0–2	Sarpsborg 08	Bodø
18:00 CEST (UTC+2)	Babenko (yellow card) 66'; Jacobsen (yellow card) 74'	Report	Thomassen 7'; Kirkevold (yellow card) 66'; Ernemann 69' (yellow card) 75'; Trondsen (yellow card) 77'	Stadium: Aspmyra Stadion; Attendance: 2,905; Referee: Kai Erik Steen

8 May 2016 9	Odd	2–1	Bodø/Glimt	Skien
15:30 CEST (UTC+2)	Occéan 39', 79'	Report	Jevtović 71'	Stadium: Skagerak Arena; Attendance: 7,221; Referee: Svein Oddvar Moen

11 May 2016 10	Bodø/Glimt	0–0	Vålerenga	Bodø
19:00 CEST (UTC+2)	Normann (yellow card) 29'	Report	Larsen (yellow card) 69'	Stadium: Aspmyra Stadion; Attendance: 2,898; Referee: Tommy Skjerven

16 May 2016 11	Tromsø	1–2	Bodø/Glimt	Tromsø
15:30 CEST (UTC+2)	Wangberg (yellow card) 45+1'; Ødegaard (yellow card) 72'; Olsen 74'; Antonsen (yellow card) 76'	Report	Jevtović 64', 77'; Hauge (yellow card) 90+1'	Stadium: Alfheim Stadion; Attendance: 6,343; Referee: Trond Ivar Døvle

22 May 2016 12	Bodø/Glimt	0–1	Aalesund	Bodø
15:00 CEST (UTC+2)	Moe (yellow card) 90+1'	Report	O.Lie 8'; Arnarson (yellow card) 31' (yellow-red card) 90+3'; Hoff (yellow card) 85'	Stadium: Aspmyra Stadion; Attendance: 7,513; Referee: Espen Eskås

29 May 2016 13	Viking	2–0	Bodø/Glimt	Stavanger
18:00 CEST (UTC+2)	Sverrisson 4'; Kronberg 20'; Ibrahim (yellow card) 80'	Report	Edvardsen (yellow card) 49'; Bjørnbak (yellow card) 53'; Hauge (yellow card) 90+1'	Stadium: Viking Stadion; Attendance: 10,165; Referee: Kim Andre Johnsen

2 July 2016 14	Bodø/Glimt	0–0	Rosenborg	Bodø
18:00 CEST (UTC+2)		Report	Eyjólfsson (yellow card) 57'; Konradsen (yellow card) 68'	Stadium: Aspmyra Stadion; Attendance: 3,325; Referee: Trond Ivar Døvle

8 July 2016 15	Start	1–4	Bodø/Glimt	Kristiansand
19:00 CEST (UTC+2)	Nwakali 57'	Report	Olsen 32'; Moe (yellow card) 55'; Furebotn 67'; Azemi 90'; Hauge 90+4' (pen.)	Stadium: Sør Arena; Attendance: 4,318; Referee: Martin Lundby

17 July 2016 16	Bodø/Glimt	2–1	Odd	Bodø
18:00 CEST (UTC+2)	Normann (yellow card) 26'; Olsen 36' (yellow card) 56'; Azemi 65'	Report	Ruud 28'; Gashi (yellow card) 87'	Stadium: Aspmyra Stadion; Attendance: 2,935; Referee: Tom Harald Hagen

24 July 2016 17	Sogndal	2–2	Bodø/Glimt	Sogndal
18:00 CEST (UTC+2)	Opseth 74'; Sveen 85'; Ramsland (yellow card) 88'	Report	Olsen 19', 61'; Edvardsen (yellow card) 89'	Stadium: Fosshaugane Campus; Attendance: 3,219; Referee: Dag Vidar Hafsås

31 July 2016 18	Bodø/Glimt	0–3	Tromsø	Bodø
18:00 CEST (UTC+2)	Normann (yellow card) 45'; Moe (yellow card) 79'; Konradsen (yellow card) 89'	Report	Espejord 35'; Olsen (yellow card) 54'; Sigurðarson 80'; Gundersen 90+1'	Stadium: Aspmyra Stadion; Attendance: 4,382; Referee: Espen Eskås

6 August 2016 19	Molde	3–2	Bodø/Glimt	Molde
15:30 CEST (UTC+2)	Aursnes 8'; Brustad 11'; Roseth (yellow card) 50'; Svendsen 51'	Report	Berg 13'; Olsen (yellow card) 38' (goal) 66'; Konradsen (yellow card) 62'; Jonassen (yellow card) 87'	Stadium: Aker Stadion; Attendance: 7,929; Referee: Ola Hobber Nilsen

13 August 2016 20	Bodø/Glimt	1–1	Lillestrøm	Bodø
15:30 CEST (UTC+2)	Jevtović (yellow card) 45+1'; Berg (yellow card) 54'; Babenko (yellow card) 61'; Azemi 71'	Report	Rindarøy (yellow card) 37'; Ofkir 48'; Martin (yellow card) 90'	Stadium: Aspmyra Stadion; Attendance: 2,938; Referee: Tore Hansen

19 August 2016 21	Vålerenga	1–1	Bodø/Glimt	Oslo
19:00 CEST (UTC+2)	Wæhler (yellow card) 24'; Larsen (yellow card) 59'; Juklerød 65'	Report	Azemi 43'; Jacobsen (yellow card) 57'; Pohorilyy (yellow card) 90'; Mockenhaupt (yellow card) 90'	Stadium: Ullevaal Stadion; Attendance: 7,447; Referee: Tommy Skjerven

28 August 2016 22	Bodø/Glimt	2–0	Start	Bodø
18:00 CEST (UTC+2)	Jakobsen (yellow card) 25'; Azemi 60'; Halvorsen 63' (pen.) (yellow card) 72'	Report		Stadium: Aspmyra Stadion; Attendance: 3,087; Referee: Martin Lundby

11 September 2016 23	Sarpsborg 08	1–2	Bodø/Glimt	Sarpsborg
18:00 CEST (UTC+2)	Heintz 6'; Rosted (yellow card) 79'	Report	Halvorsen 33' (yellow card) 51'; Manzon 88' (yellow card) 90+3'	Stadium: Sarpsborg Stadion; Attendance: 4,023; Referee: Dag Vidar Hafsås

18 September 2016 24	Bodø/Glimt	1–3	Brann	Bodø
18:00 CEST (UTC+2)	Azemi 18'; Edvardsen (yellow card) 23'; Normann (yellow card) 40'; Bjørnbak (yellow card) 78'; Manzon (yellow card) 90'	Report	Barmen 13', 55' (yellow card) 66'; Haugen (yellow card) 40'; Orlov 48'; Braaten (yellow card) 74'; Vega (yellow card) 85'; Acosta (yellow card) 90'; Karadas (yellow card) 90+2'	Stadium: Aspmyra Stadion; Attendance: 7,564; Referee: Espen Eskås

26 September 2016 25	Stabæk	1–0	Bodø/Glimt	Bærum
20:00 CEST (UTC+2)	Meling (yellow card) 57'; Hanche-Olsen 62'; Mandé (yellow card) 90+2'; Gorozia (yellow card) 90+5'	Report	Saltnes (yellow card) 15'; Jakobsen (yellow card) 34'	Stadium: Nadderud Stadion; Attendance: 3,643; Referee: Trond Ivar Døvle

30 September 2016 26	Bodø/Glimt	4–2	Strømsgodset	Bodø
18:00 CEST (UTC+2)	Halvorsen 54' (pen.); Azemi 58'; Bjørnbak 76'; Mockenhaupt 82'	Report	Høiland 34', 48' (yellow card) 85'	Stadium: Aspmyra Stadion; Attendance: 2,840; Referee: Tom Harald Hagen

15 October 2016 27	Aalesund	1–0	Bodø/Glimt	Ålesund
15:30 CEST (UTC+2)	Wormgoor (yellow card) 48'; Saltnes 63' (o.g.)	Report	Mockenhaupt (yellow card) 16'; Normann (yellow card) 23'	Stadium: Color Line Stadion; Attendance: 6,007; Referee: Svein-Erik Edvartsen

23 October 2016 28	Haugesund	2–1	Bodø/Glimt	Haugesund
18:00 CEST (UTC+2)	Tubić (yellow card) 9'; Troost-Ekong 35'; Kiss 56'	Report	Azemi 44'	Stadium: Haugesund Stadion; Attendance: 4,302; Referee: Ola Hobber Nilsen

30 October 2016 29	Bodø/Glimt	0–2	Viking	Bodø
18:00 CET (UTC+1)		Report	Sale 39'; Danielsen 79' (pen.)	Stadium: Aspmyra Stadion; Attendance: 2,984; Referee: Trond Ivar Døvle

6 November 2016 30	Rosenborg	2–1	Bodø/Glimt	Trondheim
18:00 CET (UTC+1)	Bakenga 34'; Helland (yellow card) 40'; Eyjólfsson 60'	Report	Jonassen (yellow card) 29'; Manzon (yellow card) 45'; Azemi 68'	Stadium: Lerkendal Stadion; Attendance: 17,732; Referee: Tommy Skjerven

==== Table ====
Pos	Team	Pld	W	D	L	GF	GA	GD	Pts	Qualification or relegation
12	Lillestrøm	30	8	10	12	45	50	−5	34	
13	Tromsø	30	9	7	14	36	46	−10	34	
14	Stabæk (O)	30	8	7	15	35	42	−7	31	Qualification for the relegation play-offs
15	Bodø/Glimt (R)	30	8	6	16	36	45	−9	30	Relegation to First Division
16	Start (R)	30	2	10	18	23	59	−36	16	Relegation to First Division

Source: Football Association of Norway (in Norwegian), Soccerway
Rules for classification: 1) Points; 2) Goal difference; 3) Goals scored; 4) Head-to-head points; 5) Head-to-head goal difference; 6) Head-to-head away goals scored (between two teams).
(O) Play-off winners; (R) Relegated

=== Norwegian Cup ===
13 April 2016 First Round	Fløya	0–6	Bodø/Glimt	Tromsø
17:00 CEST (UTC+2)	M.Johnsen (yellow card) 46'; M.Andersen (yellow card) 85'	Report	Wiig 32', 90'; Azemi 55'; Edvardsen (yellow card) 65'; Hauge 71', 82', 85'	Stadium: Fløyabanen; Attendance: 285; Referee: Sander M. Bråten Johannessen

27 April 2016 Second Round	Mo	0–6	Bodø/Glimt	Mo i Rana
18:00 CEST (UTC+2)		Report	Normann 8', 66'; Jevtović 22', 83'; Olsen 55'; Hauge 75'; Furebotn (yellow card) 80'	Stadium: Nye Sagbakken Stadion; Attendance: 850; Referee: Geir-Oskar Isaksen

5 May 2016 Third Round	Alta	1–4	Bodø/Glimt	Alta
18:00 CEST (UTC+2)	M. Nikolaisen 32'; M. Eltermanis (red card) 45'	Report	Azemi 14'; Olsen 26', 87'; Furebotn 72'	Stadium: Finnmarkshallen; Attendance: 790; Referee: Anders Gjermshus

25 May 2016 Fourth Round	Bodø/Glimt	3–3 (a.e.t.) (7–6 p)	Haugesund	Bodø
18:00 CEST (UTC+2)	Normann 48'; Jacobsen (yellow card) 52'; Azemi 84', (yellow card) 87'; Furebotn 101'	Report	Mæland 81', 99'; Agdestein 88'; Anthony (yellow card) 92'	Stadium: Aspmyra Stadion; Attendance: 942; Referee: Ola Hobber Nilsen
	Penalties
	Babenko (penalty scored); Jevtović (penalty scored); Bjørnbak (penalty scored); Saltnes (penalty scored); Olsen (penalty missed); Hauge (penalty scored); Furebotn (penalty scored); Jacobsen (penalty scored)		(penalty scored) Kiss; (penalty scored) Agdestein; (penalty scored) Mæland; (penalty missed) Tronstad; (penalty scored) Hajradinović; (penalty scored) Stølås; (penalty scored) Skjerve; (penalty missed) Bjørkkjær

21 September 2016 Quarter-final	Bodø/Glimt	4–0	Sarpsborg 08	Bodø
18:00 CEST (UTC+2)	Manzon 5', 43'; Edvardsen (yellow card) 20'; Berg (yellow card) 53', (goal) 77'; Osvold 90+1'	Report	Lund Nielsen (yellow card) 53'; Thomassen (yellow card) 80'	Stadium: Aspmyra Stadion; Attendance: 1,456; Referee: Martin Lundby

26 October 2016 Semi-inal	Rosenborg	2–0	Bodø/Glimt	Trondheim
20:00 CEST (UTC+2)	Midtsjø 22'; Skjelvik 90+2'	Report	Azemi (yellow card) 85'	Stadium: Lerkendal Stadion; Attendance: 12,453; Referee: Svein Oddvar Moen

== Squad statistics ==
As of match played 6 November 2016

=== Appearances and goals ===
No.	Pos	Nat	Player	Total		Tippeligaen		Norwegian Cup	
No.	Pos	Nat	Player	Apps	Goals	Apps	Goals	Apps	Goals
1	GK	(Canada) CAN	Simon Thomas	13	0	9	0	4	0
3	DF	(Norway) NOR	Emil Jonassen	26	1	20+2	1	3+1	0
4	DF	(Norway) NOR	Martin Bjørnbak	35	2	30	2	5	0
5	MF	(Norway) NOR	Thomas Jacobsen	33	0	28	0	5	0
6	DF	(Germany) GER	Sascha Mockenhaupt	12	1	10	1	2	0
7	FW	(Norway) NOR	Fitim Azemi	35	14	29	11	6	3
8	MF	(Norway) NOR	Ole Jørgen Halvorsen	12	4	9+1	4	2	0
9	MF	(Egypt) EGY	Alexander Jakobsen	12	0	10	0	1+1	0
10	MF	(Ukraine) UKR	Ruslan Babenko	23	0	14+5	0	2+2	0
14	MF	(Norway) NOR	Ulrik Saltnes	16	0	7+5	0	4	0
16	MF	(Norway) NOR	Morten Konradsen	13	0	1+11	0	1	0
17	MF	(Norway) NOR	Mathias Normann	33	3	26+1	0	6	3
18	DF	(Norway) NOR	Brede Moe	19	0	17	0	2	0
19	FW	(Norway) NOR	Joachim Osvold	2	1	0+1	0	1	1
21	DF	(Norway) NOR	Daniel Edvardsen	24	0	16+5	0	3	0
22	FW	(Russia) RUS	Vadim Manzon	12	3	2+8	1	1+1	2
23	GK	(Ukraine) UKR	Serhiy Pohorilyy	7	0	7	0	0	0
24	DF	(Norway) NOR	Fredrik André Bjørkan	12	0	2+7	0	2+1	0
27	MF	(Norway) NOR	Patrick Berg	22	2	12+6	1	3+1	1
28	FW	(Norway) NOR	William Arne Hanssen	2	0	0+1	0	1	0
30	FW	(Norway) NOR	Trond Olsen	36	9	29+1	6	5+1	3
31	MF	(Norway) NOR	Jens Petter Hauge	24	5	2+18	1	0+4	4
Players away from Bodø/Glimt on loan:
Players who appeared for Bodø/Glimt no longer at the club:
6	MF	(Norway) NOR	Anders Karlsen	11	0	4+5	0	1+1	0
8	MF	(Norway) NOR	Henrik Furebotn	19	4	13+3	2	3	2
9	FW	(Norway) NOR	Martin Wiig	8	2	2+5	0	1	2
11	FW	(Serbia) SRB	Milan Jevtović	23	8	17+3	6	2+1	2
22	DF	(Norway) NOR	Martin Pedersen	1	0	0	0	0+1	0
25	GK	(Iceland) ISL	Hannes Þór Halldórsson	16	0	14	0	2	0

=== Goal scorers ===
Place	Position	Nation	Number	Name	Tippeligaen	Norwegian Cup	Total
1	FW	(Norway)	7	Fitim Azemi	11	3	14
2	FW	(Norway)	30	Trond Olsen	6	3	9
3	FW	(Serbia)	11	Milan Jevtović	6	2	8
4	FW	(Norway)	31	Jens Petter Hauge	1	4	5
5	MF	(Norway)	8	Ole Jørgen Halvorsen	4	0	4
5	MF	(Norway)	8	Henrik Furebotn	2	2	4
7	FW	(Russia)	22	Vadim Manzon	1	2	3
7	MF	(Norway)	17	Mathias Normann	0	3	3
9	DF	(Norway)	4	Martin Bjørnbak	2	0	2
9	MF	(Norway)	27	Patrick Berg	1	1	2
9	FW	(Norway)	9	Martin Wiig	0	2	2
12	DF	(Norway)	3	Emil Jonassen	1	0	1
12	DF	(Germany)	6	Sascha Mockenhaupt	1	0	1
12	FW	(Norway)	19	Joachim Osvold	0	1	1
				TOTALS	36	23	59

=== Clean sheets ===
Place	Position	Nation	Number	Name	Tippeligaen	Norwegian Cup	Total
1	GK	(Canada)	1	Simon Thomas	2	3	5
2	GK	(Iceland)	25	Hannes Þór Halldórsson	2	0	2
				TOTALS	4	3	7

=== Disciplinary record ===
Number	Nation	Position	Name	Tippeligaen		Norwegian Cup		Total	
Number	Nation	Position	Name	Booked	Sent off (straight red)	Booked	Sent off (straight red)	Booked	Sent off (straight red)
3	(Norway)	DF	Emil Jonassen	2	0	0	0	2	0
4	(Norway)	DF	Martin Bjørnbak	2	0	0	0	2	0
5	(Norway)	DF	Thomas Jacobsen	3	0	1	0	3	0
6	(Germany)	DF	Sascha Mockenhaupt	2	0	0	0	2	0
7	(Norway)	FW	Fitim Azemi	0	0	2	0	2	0
8	(Norway)	MF	Ole Jørgen Halvorsen	2	0	0	0	2	0
9	(Egypt)	MF	Alexander Jakobsen	2	0	0	0	2	0
10	(Ukraine)	MF	Ruslan Babenko	4	0	0	0	4	0
14	(Norway)	MF	Ulrik Saltnes	1	0	0	0	1	0
16	(Norway)	MF	Morten Konradsen	2	0	0	0	2	0
17	(Norway)	MF	Mathias Normann	7	0	0	0	7	0
18	(Norway)	DF	Brede Moe	3	0	0	0	3	0
21	(Norway)	DF	Daniel Edvardsen	3	0	2	0	5	0
22	(Russia)	FW	Vadim Manzon	3	0	0	0	3	0
23	(Ukraine)	GK	Serhiy Pohorilyy	1	0	0	0	1	0
27	(Norway)	MF	Patrick Berg	1	0	1	0	2	0
30	(Norway)	FW	Trond Olsen	2	0	0	0	2	0
31	(Norway)	FW	Jens Petter Hauge	2	0	0	0	2	0
Players away on loan:
Players who appeared for Bodø/Glimt no longer at the club:
8	(Norway)	MF	Henrik Furebotn	0	0	1	0	1	0
11	(Serbia)	FW	Milan Jevtović	1	0	0	0	1	0
			TOTALS	43	0	7	0	50	0
