= List of Norwegian football transfers summer 2016 =

This is a list of Norwegian football transfers in the 2016 summer transfer window by club. Only clubs of the 2016 Tippeligaen and 2016 Norwegian First Division is included.

== Tippeligaen ==
=== Bodø/Glimt ===
In:

No.	Pos.	Nation	Player
6	DF	GER	Sascha Mockenhaupt (on loan from (Germany) 1. FC Kaiserslautern)
8	MF	NOR	Ole Jørgen Halvorsen (on loan from (Norway) Odd)
9	MF	DEN	Alexander Jakobsen (free agent)
22	FW	RUS	Vadim Manzon (on loan from (Germany) Karlsruher SC)
23	GK	UKR	Serhiy Pohorilyy (from (Ukraine) Metalist Kharkiv)

Out:

No.	Pos.	Nation	Player
6	MF	NOR	Anders Karlsen (retired)
8	MF	NOR	Henrik Furebotn (to (Norway) Sogndal)
9	FW	NOR	Martin Wiig (to (Norway) KFUM Oslo)
11	FW	SRB	Milan Jevtović (loan return to (Austria) LASK Linz, later sold to (Turkey) Antalyaspor)
25	GK	ISL	Hannes Þór Halldórsson (loan return to (Netherlands) NEC, later sold to (Denmark) Randers)

=== Brann ===
In:

No.	Pos.	Nation	Player
22	FW	NOR	Torgeir Børven (on loan from (Netherlands) Twente)

Out:

No.	Pos.	Nation	Player
7	MF	NOR	Kristoffer Larsen (to (Denmark) Lyngby)
17	DF	NOR	Viljar Vevatne (to (Norway) Sandnes Ulf)
20	FW	NOR	Håkon Lorentzen (released)
22	FW	DEN	Mads Dittmer Hvilsom (loan return to (Germany) Eintracht Braunschweig, later loaned to (Denmark) Esbjerg)
26	DF	FIN	Dani Hatakka (on loan to (Norway) Hødd)
39	FW	NOR	Oliver Rotihaug (on loan to (Norway) Florø)

=== Haugesund ===
In:

No.	Pos.	Nation	Player
6	MF	SVK	Filip Kiss (from (Wales) Cardiff City, previously on loan)
7	FW	NOR	Liban Abdi (free agent)
16	MF	GHA	Derrick Mensah (loan return from (Croatia) Istra 1961)
20	FW	GHA	Kwame Karikari (loan return from (Kazakhstan) Irtysh Pavlodar)

Out:

No.	Pos.	Nation	Player
16	MF	GHA	Derrick Mensah (on loan to (Czech Republic) Karviná)
16	MF	GHA	Derrick Mensah (on loan to (Croatia) Istra 1961)
20	FW	GHA	Kwame Karikari (on loan to (Kazakhstan) Irtysh Pavlodar)
20	FW	GHA	Kwame Karikari (to (Ukraine) Stal Kamianske)

=== Lillestrøm ===
In:

No.	Pos.	Nation	Player
1	GK	ISL	Haraldur Björnsson (from (Sweden) Östersund)
6	MF	NGA	Ifeanyi Mathew
14	DF	GHA	Francis Dickoh (from (Denmark) SønderjyskE)
19	FW	ENG	Gary Martin (on loan from (Iceland) Víkingur)
23	FW	SVK	Tomáš Malec (on loan from (Slovakia) Trenčín)
41	GK	NOR	Pål Vestly Heigre (on loan from (Norway) Viking)

Out:

No.	Pos.	Nation	Player
2	DF	SWE	Martin Falkeborn (on loan to (Norway) Ull/Kisa)
9	FW	ISL	Árni Vilhjálmsson (on loan to (Iceland) Breiðablik)
23	FW	NGA	Fred Friday (to (Netherlands) AZ)
41	GK	NOR	Pål Vestly Heigre (loan return to (Norway) Viking)

=== Molde ===
In:

No.	Pos.	Nation	Player
8	MF	SEN	Babacar Sarr (from (Norway) Sogndal)
10	FW	ISL	Björn Bergmann Sigurðarson (from (England) Wolverhampton Wanderers)
18	DF	FIN	Roni Peiponen (loan return from (Norway) Åsane)
22	DF	DEN	Christoffer Remmer (from (Denmark) Copenhagen)
33	FW	NOR	Fredrik Brustad (from (Sweden) AIK)

Out:

No.	Pos.	Nation	Player
8	FW	NOR	Fredrik Gulbrandsen (to (Austria) Red Bull Salzburg)
13	MF	NGA	Thompson Ekpe (on loan to (Norway) Kristiansund)
16	MF	LBR	Dulee Johnson (released)
18	DF	FIN	Roni Peiponen (on loan to (Finland) HJK Helsinki, previously on loan at (Norway) Åsane)
22	FW	ISL	Eiður Guðjohnsen (released)
24	FW	NOR	Mohamed Elyounoussi (to (Switzerland) Basel)
27	FW	NOR	Mushaga Bakenga (loan return to (Belgium) Club Brugge)

=== Odd ===
In:

No.	Pos.	Nation	Player
13	MF	NOR	Stefan Mladenovic (from (Norway) Pors Grenland)
24	FW	FIN	Riku Riski (from (Norway) Rosenborg)

Out:

No.	Pos.	Nation	Player
7	MF	NOR	Ole Jørgen Halvorsen (on loan to (Norway) Bodø/Glimt)
9	FW	NOR	Henrik Kjelsrud Johansen (to (Norway) Vålerenga)
—	FW	NOR	Tobias Lauritsen (to (Norway) Pors)

=== Rosenborg ===
In:

No.	Pos.	Nation	Player
24	GK	GHA	Adam Larsen Kwarasey (from (United States) Portland Timbers)
26	FW	DEN	Emil Nielsen (loan return from (Denmark) AGF)
27	FW	NOR	Mushaga Bakenga (free agent)

Out:

No.	Pos.	Nation	Player
3	DF	SWE	Mikael Dorsin (retired)
17	MF	NOR	John Hou Sæter (on loan to (Norway) Ranheim)
24	FW	FIN	Riku Riski (to (Norway) Odd)
26	FW	DEN	Emil Nielsen (to (Denmark) FC Roskilde)
31	DF	NOR	Per Magnus Steiring (on loan to (Norway) Viking)

=== Sarpsborg 08 ===
In:

No.	Pos.	Nation	Player
11	DF	NOR	Morten Sundli (from (Norway) Mjøndalen)
23	MF	NOR	Kristoffer Normann Hansen (from (Norway) Sandefjord)

Out:

No.	Pos.	Nation	Player
2	FW	NOR	Brice Wembangomo (on loan to (Norway) Fredrikstad)
4	DF	NOR	Kjetil Berge (to (Norway) Sandefjord)
11	MF	NOR	Kristoffer Tokstad (to (Norway) Strømsgodset)
23	DF	NOR	Jakob Glesnes (to (Norway) Strømsgodset)
85	FW	FRA	Alexy Bosetti (loan return to (France) Nice)

=== Sogndal ===
In:

No.	Pos.	Nation	Player
6	MF	NOR	Peter Aase (loan return from (Norway) Åsane)
16	DF	NOR	Vegard Leikvoll Moberg (from (Norway) Åsane)
26	DF	DEN	Magnus Pedersen (from (Denmark) OB, previously on loan)
29	GK	NOR	Stefan Hagerup (loan return from (Norway) Ull/Kisa)
—	MF	NOR	Henrik Furebotn (from (Norway) Bodø/Glimt)
—	MF	NOR	Johan Hove (Promoted)

Out:

No.	Pos.	Nation	Player
5	DF	NOR	Victor Grodås (on loan to (Norway) Kristiansund)
6	MF	NOR	Peter Aase (on loan to (Norway) Florø, previously on loan at (Norway) Åsane)
8	FW	NOR	Fredrik Flo (on loan to (Norway) Fana)
16	MF	SEN	Babacar Sarr (to (Norway) Molde)
29	GK	NOR	Stefan Hagerup (on loan to (Norway) Ull/Kisa)
34	MF	NOR	Simen Brekkhus (on loan to (Norway) Florø)

=== Stabæk ===
In:

No.	Pos.	Nation	Player
4	DF	SWE	Marcus Nilsson (from (England) Fleetwood Town)
7	FW	CRC	Mynor Escoe (on loan from (Costa Rica) Saprissa)
32	MF	BRA	Alanzinho (from (Turkey) Gaziantep B.B.)
77	FW	NOR	Muhamed Keita (on loan from (Poland) Lech Poznan, previously on loan at (Norway) Strømsgodset)

Out:

No.	Pos.	Nation	Player
4	DF	NOR	Nicolai Næss (to (United States) Columbus Crew)
7	MF	GHA	Ernest Asante (to (Denmark) Nordsjælland)
13	MF	NOR	Eirik Haugstad (to (Norway) Jerv)
17	DF	SCO	Alex Davey (loan return to (England) Chelsea)
50	FW	NOR	Marcus Mehnert (to (Norway) Asker)
—	MF	NOR	Cornelius Bencsik (to (Norway) Asker)

=== Start ===
In:

No.	Pos.	Nation	Player
10	MF	LBR	Dulee Johnson (free agent)
18	MF	NOR	Jibril Bojang (from (Norway) Lørenskog)
33	FW	GHA	Denny Antwi (from (Norway) Jerv)
—	MF	NOR	Thomas Zernichow (from (Norway) Vindbjart)

Out:

No.	Pos.	Nation	Player
8	FW	NOR	Espen Hoff (retired, after the season)
21	MF	NOR	Henrik Breimyr (to (Norway) Sandnes Ulf)
25	GK	IRL	Sean McDermott (to (Norway) Ull/Kisa)
32	MF	NOR	Mathias Rasmussen (to (Denmark) Nordsjælland)

=== Strømsgodset ===
In:

No.	Pos.	Nation	Player
5	DF	NOR	Jakob Glesnes (from (Norway) Sarpsborg 08)
15	MF	NOR	Kristoffer Tokstad (from (Norway) Sarpsborg 08)
21	MF	NOR	Mathias Gjerstrøm (loan return from (Norway) Kongsvinger)
23	MF	NOR	Eirik Ulland Andersen (from (Norway) Hødd)

Out:

No.	Pos.	Nation	Player
15	FW	KOS	Flamur Kastrati (to (Norway) Aalesund)
23	FW	NOR	Thomas Sørum (to (Norway) Mjøndalen)
71	DF	NOR	Gustav Valsvik (to (Germany) Eintracht Braunschweig)
77	FW	NOR	Muhamed Keita (loan return to (Poland) Lech Poznan, later loaned to (Norway) Stabæk)

=== Tromsø ===
In:

No.	Pos.	Nation	Player
8	MF	NOR	Ulrik Yttergård Jenssen (from (France) Lyon)

Out:

No.	Pos.	Nation	Player
8	MF	SWE	Jens Jacobsson (released)

=== Viking ===
In:

No.	Pos.	Nation	Player
8	MF	WAL	Chris Dawson (on loan from (England) Rotherham United)
13	DF	NOR	Per Magnus Steiring (on loan from (Norway) Rosenborg)
17	MF	NOR	Andreas Breimyr (from (England) Crystal Palace)
24	GK	NOR	Pål Vestly Heigre (loan return from (Norway) Lillestrøm)

Out:

No.	Pos.	Nation	Player
5	DF	USA	A.J. Soares (to (Denmark) AGF)
8	FW	NGA	Suleiman Abdullahi (to (Germany) Eintracht Braunschweig)
10	MF	ISL	Björn Daníel Sverrisson (to (Denmark) AGF)
15	GK	NOR	Amund Wichne (on loan to (Norway) Åsane)
24	GK	NOR	Pål Vestly Heigre (on loan to (Norway) Lillestrøm)

=== Vålerenga ===
In:

No.	Pos.	Nation	Player
2	DF	NOR	Niklas Gunnarsson (loan return from (Scotland) Hibernian)
8	MF	NOR	Magnus Lekven (from (Denmark) Esbjerg)
15	DF	NOR	Markus Nakkim (loan return from (Norway) Strømmen)
20	FW	NOR	Henrik Kjelsrud Johansen (from (Norway) Odd)
28	FW	NOR	Thomas Elsebutangen (from (Norway) Pors Grenland)
29	MF	NOR	Magnus Grødem (from (Norway) Bryne)
38	DF	NOR	Kristoffer Hay (from (Norway) Hønefoss)
39	MF	GHA	Ernest Agyiri (on loan from (England) Manchester City)
—	MF	ISL	Samúel Friðjónsson (from (England) Reading)
—	FW	NOR	Riki Alba (loan return from (Sweden) Varbergs BoIS)

Out:

No.	Pos.	Nation	Player
2	DF	NOR	Niklas Gunnarsson (to (Sweden) Djurgården, previously on loan at (Scotland) Hibernian)
8	DF	SWE	Jesper Arvidsson (released)
24	FW	ISL	Elías Már Ómarsson (on loan to (Sweden) Göteborg)
26	FW	JAM	Deshorn Brown (to (China) Shenzhen)
—	FW	NOR	Riki Alba (on loan to (Norway) Ull/Kisa, previously on loan at (Sweden) Varbergs BoIS)

=== Aalesund ===
In:

No.	Pos.	Nation	Player
6	DF	NED	Vito Wormgoor (from (Netherlands) ADO Den Haag)
—	FW	KOS	Flamur Kastrati (from (Norway) Strømsgodset)

Out:

No.	Pos.	Nation	Player
6	DF	NOR	John Arne Riise (retired)
20	MF	NOR	Thomas Martinussen (to (Norway) Brattvåg)
—	FW	NOR	Torbjørn Grytten (to (Norway) Brattvåg, loan made permanent)

== OBOS-ligaen ==
=== Bryne ===
In:

No.	Pos.	Nation	Player
22	FW	NOR	Bajram Ajeti (from (Norway) Moss)
33	FW	NOR	Marius Helle (from (Norway) Sandnes Ulf)

Out:

No.	Pos.	Nation	Player
22	MF	NOR	Magnus Grødem (to (Norway) Vålerenga)

=== Fredrikstad ===
In:

No.	Pos.	Nation	Player
14	FW	NOR	Ulrik Flo (from (Denmark) Silkeborg)
17	FW	NOR	Brice Wembangomo (on loan from (Norway) Sarpsborg 08)

Out:

No.	Pos.	Nation	Player
14	MF	NOR	Andreas Aalbu (on loan to (Sweden) Varbergs BoIS)
17	MF	NOR	Mats André Kaland (on loan to (Sweden) Varbergs BoIS)

=== Hødd ===
In:

No.	Pos.	Nation	Player
5	DF	FIN	Dani Hatakka (on loan from (Norway) Brann)

Out:

No.	Pos.	Nation	Player
23	MF	NOR	Eirik Ulland Andersen (to (Norway) Strømsgodset)

=== Jerv ===
In:

No.	Pos.	Nation	Player
9	MF	NOR	Eirik Haugstad (from (Norway) Stabæk)
21	FW	SEN	Dioum Sow (from (Senegal) Diambars)

Out:

No.	Pos.	Nation	Player
17	MF	GHA	Fuseini Mohammed (to (Norway) Åsane)
33	FW	GHA	Denny Antwi (to (Norway) Start)

=== KFUM Oslo ===
In:

No.	Pos.	Nation	Player
—	DF	NOR	Andreas Lübeck (from (Norway) Follo)
—	FW	NOR	Martin Wiig (from (Norway) Bodø/Glimt)

Out:

No.	Pos.	Nation	Player

=== Kongsvinger ===
In:

No.	Pos.	Nation	Player
19	FW	SEN	Mame Niang (from (South Africa) Mamelodi Sundowns)

Out:

No.	Pos.	Nation	Player
7	MF	CIV	Emile Noe Dadjo (to (Norway) Raufoss)
17	MF	NOR	Mathias Gjerstrøm (loan return to (Norway) Strømsgodset)
19	FW	GRE	Ioannis Sotiroglou (loan return to (Cyprus) ENTHOI Lakatamia)

=== Kristiansund ===
In:

No.	Pos.	Nation	Player
4	MF	NGA	Thompson Ekpe (on loan from (Norway) Molde)
7	FW	NOR	Rocky Lekaj (from (Norway) Raufoss)
13	GK	SEN	Sergine Mor Mbaye (from (Belgium) Eupen)
—	DF	NOR	Victor Grodås (on loan from (Norway) Sogndal)

Out:

No.	Pos.	Nation	Player
37	DF	NOR	Andreas Søfteland (to (Norway) Kristiansund FK)
—	MF	NOR	Daniel Berg (to (Norway) Bærum)
77	FW	NOR	Rozhat Shaswari (to (Norway) Bærum)

=== Levanger ===
In:

No.	Pos.	Nation	Player
12	GK	NOR	Henrik Mathias Bakke (from (Norway) Lillehammer)
20	MF	SWE	Mtaka Simba (from (Norway) Elverum)
26	MF	NOR	Thomas Sivertsen (from (Norway) Steinkjer)

Out:

No.	Pos.	Nation	Player
12	GK	SWE	Jonathan Malmberg (loan return to (Sweden) GIF Sundsvall)
21	FW	NOR	Erlend Flø Gustad (on loan to (Norway) Verdal)
26	DF	SWE	Sebastian Starkenberg (to (Sweden) Gute)
33	GK	NOR	Jakob Storevik (to (Norway) Florø)

=== Mjøndalen ===
In:

No.	Pos.	Nation	Player
1	GK	IRN	Sosha Makani (from (Iran) Persepolis)
—	FW	NOR	Thomas Sørum (to (Norway) Strømsgodset)

Out:

No.	Pos.	Nation	Player
1	GK	NOR	Ivar Andreas Forn (retired)
17	MF	NOR	Sebastian Hansen (on loan to (Norway) Fram Larvik)
18	FW	NOR	Andreas Hellum (on loan to (Norway) Asker)
22	DF	NOR	Morten Sundli (to (Norway) Sarpsborg 08)

=== Ranheim ===
In:

No.	Pos.	Nation	Player
10	MF	NOR	John Hou Sæter (on loan from (Norway) Rosenborg)
17	MF	NOR	Sondre Sørløkk

Out:

No.	Pos.	Nation	Player

=== Raufoss ===
In:

No.	Pos.	Nation	Player
14	FW	NOR	Magnus Solum (on loan from (Sweden) Degerfors)
—	MF	CIV	Emile Noe Dadjo (from (Norway) Kongsvinger)

Out:

No.	Pos.	Nation	Player
6	DF	NOR	Aleksander Solli (to (Norway) Asker)
7	FW	NOR	Rocky Lekaj (to (Norway) Kristiansund)
8	MF	NOR	Lars Johan Kollshaugen (to (Norway) Gjøvik-Lyn)
14	FW	NOR	Håvard Lysvoll (to (Norway) Tromsdalen)
15	MF	RSA	Haashim Domingo (loan return to (Portugal) Vitória de Guimarães)

=== Sandefjord ===
In:

No.	Pos.	Nation	Player
18	DF	NOR	Kjetil Berge (from (Norway) Sarpsborg 08)
—	FW	NOR	Håkon Lorentzen (free agent)

Out:

No.	Pos.	Nation	Player
11	MF	NOR	Martin Torp (on loan to (Norway) Ull/Kisa)
21	MF	NOR	Kristoffer Normann Hansen (to (Norway) Sarpsborg 08)

=== Sandnes Ulf ===
In:

No.	Pos.	Nation	Player
3	DF	NOR	Viljar Vevatne (from (Norway) Brann)
18	MF	NOR	Henrik Breimyr (from (Norway) Start)

Out:

No.	Pos.	Nation	Player
9	FW	NOR	Marius Helle (to (Norway) Bryne)
16	MF	NOR	Niklas Sandberg (on loan to (Norway) Nest-Sotra)
25	DF	NOR	Vegard Skjørestad (on loan to (Norway) Vidar)

=== Strømmen ===
In:

No.	Pos.	Nation	Player
19	FW	GER	Joy-Slayde Mickels
33	FW	NOR	Martin Trøen (from (Norway) Eidsvold Turn)

Out:

No.	Pos.	Nation	Player
2	DF	NOR	Markus Nakkim (loan return to (Norway) Vålerenga)
19	DF	SWE	Viktor Adebahr (to (Norway) Kvik Halden)
21	DF	NOR	Johannes Grødtlien (on loan to (Norway) Moss)

=== Ull/Kisa ===
In:

No.	Pos.	Nation	Player
4	FW	NOR	Riki Alba (on loan from (Norway) Vålerenga, previously on loan at (Sweden) Varbergs BoIS)
22	DF	SWE	Martin Falkeborn (on loan from (Norway) Lillestrøm)
25	MF	NOR	Martin Torp (on loan from (Norway) Sandefjord)
30	GK	IRL	Sean McDermott (from (Norway) Start)
31	GK	NOR	Stefan Hagerup (on loan from (Norway) Sogndal)

Out:

No.	Pos.	Nation	Player
4	MF	POL	Marcin Burkhardt (released)
22	MF	POL	Michał Pawlik (loan return to (Poland) Jagiellonia Białystok)
31	GK	NOR	Stefan Hagerup (loan return to (Norway) Sogndal)

=== Åsane ===
In:

No.	Pos.	Nation	Player
6	MF	GHA	Fuseini Mohammed (from (Norway) Jerv)
—	GK	NOR	Amund Wichne (on loan from (Norway) Viking)

Out:

No.	Pos.	Nation	Player
4	DF	NOR	Vegard Leikvoll Moberg (to (Norway) Sogndal)
5	DF	NOR	Jahn-Ove Wiik (to (Norway) Fyllingsdalen)
6	MF	NOR	Peter Aase (loan return to (Norway) Sogndal, later loaned to (Norway) Florø)
7	MF	NOR	Marcus Stueland (to (Norway) Fyllingsdalen)
18	DF	FIN	Roni Peiponen (loan return to (Norway) Molde, later loaned to (Finland) HJK Helsinki)
