= 2015 FK Bodø/Glimt season =

Bodø/Glimt
2015 season
- President: Mads Torrissen
- Manager: Bjørn-Tore Hansen
- Stadium: Aspmyra Stadion
- Tippeligaen: 9th
- Norwegian Cup: Third Round vs Tromsdalen
- Top goalscorer: League: Two Players (13); All: Alexander Sørloth (14)
- Highest home attendance: 6,114 vs Tromsø (16 May 2015)
- Lowest home attendance: 2,286 vs Stabæk (8 November 2015)
- Average home league attendance: 3,184 (8 November 2015)
Home colours	Away colours

The 2015 season was Bodø/Glimt's second season back in the Tippeligaen since their relegation at the end of the 2009 season. Bodø/Glimt finished the season in 9th position, whilst also reaching the third round of the Norwegian Cup, where they were defeated by Tromsdalen.

== Squad ==
As of match played 8 November 2015

No.	Name	Nationality	Position	Date of birth (age)	Signed from	Signed in	Contract ends	Apps.	Goals
Goalkeepers
1	Pavel Londak	(Estonia)	GK	14 May 1980 (aged 35)	Flora	2007		201	0
12	Jonas Ueland Kolstad	(Norway)	GK	21 September 1976 (aged 39)	Årvoll	2002		81	0
25	Lasse Staw	(Norway)	GK	1 January 1988 (aged 27)	Aalesund	2014		29	0
Defenders
2	Ruben Imingen	(Norway)	DF	4 December 1986 (aged 28)	Fauske/Sprint	2005		184	3
3	Zarek Valentin	(United States)	DF	6 August 1991 (aged 24)	Montreal Impact	2014		62	2
18	Brede Moe	(Norway)	DF	15 December 1991 (aged 23)	Rosenborg	2015		59	6
21	Daniel Edvardsen	(Norway)	DF	31 August 1991 (aged 24)	Harstad	2014		18	0
23	Vieux Sané	(Senegal)	DF	4 August 1989 (aged 26)	Tromsø	2014		117	5
24	Kristian Brix	(Norway)	DF	13 June 1990 (aged 25)	Sandefjord	2014		53	0
29	Vebjørn Vinje	(Norway)	DF	7 April 1995 (aged 20)	Mo	2014		3	0
Midfielders
5	Thomas Jacobsen	(Norway)	MF	16 September 1983 (aged 32)	Lyn	2010		220	5
6	Anders Karlsen	(Norway)	MF	15 February 1990 (aged 25)	Youth team	2006		98	7
8	Henrik Furebotn	(Norway)	MF	11 February 1986 (aged 29)	Sandnes Ulf	2015		28	3
14	Ulrik Saltnes	(Norway)	MF	10 November 1992 (aged 22)	Brønnøysund	2011		70	6
15	Dominic Chatto	(Nigeria)	MF	7 December 1985 (aged 29)	BK Häcken	2014		47	3
16	Morten Konradsen	(Norway)	MF	3 May 1996 (aged 19)	Youth team	2012		62	9
19	Erik Tønne	(Norway)	MF	3 July 1991 (aged 24)	Sandnes Ulf	2015		9	1
26	Danny Cruz	(United States)	MF	3 January 1990 (aged 25)	loan from Philadelphia Union	2015	2015	16	2
27	Patrick Berg	(Norway)	MF	24 November 1997 (aged 17)	Youth team	2014		7	0
Forwards
9	Jim Johansen	(Norway)	FW	6 February 1987 (aged 28)	Strømsgodset	2011		95	39
10	Fitim Azemi	(Norway)	FW	25 June 1992 (aged 23)	Follo	2015		33	9
11	Alexander Sørloth	(Norway)	FW	5 December 1995 (aged 19)	loan from Rosenborg	2015	2015	29	14
26	Viljar Nordberg	(Norway)	FW	5 April 1992 (aged 23)	Vålerenga	2011			
30	Trond Olsen	(Norway)	FW	5 February 1984 (aged 31)	Viking	2014		246	72
Out on loan
17	Mathias Normann	(Norway)	MF	28 May 1996 (aged 19)	Lofoten	2012		1	0
20	Ulrik Berglann	(Norway)	FW	31 May 1992 (aged 23)	Youth team	2011		82	6
22	Martin Pedersen	(Norway)	DF	14 January 1995 (aged 20)	Youth team	2012		0	0
Players who left club during season
4	Joshua Silva	(Portugal)	DF	21 August 1990 (aged 25)	Zawisza Bydgoszcz	2015		3	0
7	Badou	(Senegal)	MF	27 October 1990 (aged 25)	Diambars	2012		114	31

=== Out on loan ===
Note: Flags indicate national team as defined under FIFA eligibility rules; some limited exceptions apply. Players may hold more than one non-FIFA nationality.

No.	Pos.	Nation	Player
17	MF	NOR	Mathias Normann (at Alta)
20	FW	NOR	Ulrik Berglann (at Strømmen)

No.	Pos.	Nation	Player
22	DF	NOR	Martin Pedersen (at Finnsnes)

== Transfers ==
=== In ===
Date	Position	Nationality	Name	From	Fee	Ref.
17 November 2014	DF	(Norway)	Brede Moe	Rosenborg	Undisclosed	
27 January 2015	MF	(Norway)	Henrik Furebotn	Sandnes Ulf	Undisclosed	
25 March 2015	FW	(Norway)	Fitim Azemi	Follo	Undisclosed	
1 April 2015	DF	(Portugal)	Joshua Silva	Zawisza Bydgoszcz	Undisclosed	
31 July 2015	MF	(Norway)	Erik Tønne	Sandnes Ulf	Undisclosed	

=== Loans in ===
Date from	Position	Nationality	Name	From	Date to	Ref.
19 December 2014	FW	(Norway)	Alexander Sørloth	Rosenborg	End of season	
22 March 2015	MF	(United States)	Danny Cruz	Philadelphia Union	End of season	

=== Out ===
Date	Position	Nationality	Name	To	Fee	Ref.
4 February 2015	FW	(Norway)	Vegard Braaten	Levanger	Undisclosed	
25 February 2015	FW	(Norway)	Ibba Laajab	Hebei China Fortune	Undisclosed	
7 March 2015	FW	(Jamaica)	Dane Richards	New York Red Bulls	Undisclosed	
4 August 2015	MF	(Senegal)	Badou	Osmanlıspor	Undisclosed	
17 August 2015	DF	(Portugal)	Joshua Silva	Viktoria 1889 Berlin	Undisclosed	

=== Loans out ===
Date from	Position	Nationality	Name	To	Date to	Ref.
23 January 2015	MF	(Norway)	Mathias Normann	Alta	End of season	
30 March 2015	FW	(Norway)	Jim Johansen	Sogndal	End of season	
9 July 2015	FW	(Norway)	Ulrik Berglann	Strømmen	End of season	
14 July 2015	DF	(Norway)	Martin Pedersen	Finnsnes	End of season	

=== Released ===
Date	Position	Nationality	Name	Joined	Date
31 December 2015	GK	(Estonia)	Pavel Londak	Rosenborg	
31 December 2015	GK	(Norway)	Lasse Staw		
31 December 2015	DF	(Norway)	Kristian Brix	Fredrikstad	9 December 2015
31 December 2015	DF	(Senegal)	Vieux Sané	Stade Brest	4 January 2016
31 December 2015	MF	(Nigeria)	Dominic Chatto	Ordabasy	26 February 2016
31 December 2015	MF	(Norway)	Erik Tønne	Fredrikstad	18 January 2016
31 December 2015	FW	(Norway)	Ulrik Berglann	Jerv	5 February 2016
31 December 2015	FW	(Norway)	Jim Johansen	Notodden	16 February 2016

== Competitions ==
=== Tippeligaen ===
==== Results summary ====
Overall								Home						Away					
Pld	W	D	L	GF	GA	GD	Pts	W	D	L	GF	GA	GD	W	D	L	GF	GA	GD
30	12	4	14	53	56	−3	40	8	1	6	32	26	+6	4	3	8	21	30	−9

Last updated: 8 November 2015.
Source: see below

==== Results by round ====
Round	1	2	3	4	5	6	7	8	9	10	11	12	13	14	15	16	17	18	19	20	21	22	23	24	25	26	27	28	29	30
Ground	A	H	H	A	H	A	H	A	H	A	H	A	H	A	H	A	H	A	H	A	A	H	A	H	A	H	A	H	A	H
Result	L	L	L	D	L	L	L	D	W	L	W	L	L	W	W	W	W	W	W	L	W	W	L	W	L	D	D	L	L	W
Position	14	16	16	15	16	16	16	16	15	16	14	15	15	15	13	12	8	8	8	8	8	7	8	8	9	8	9	9	10	9

Updated to match(es) played on 8 November 2015. Source: see below
A = Away; H = Home; W = Win; D = Draw; L = Loss

==== Results ====
6 April 2015 1	Sandefjord	3–1	Bodø/Glimt	Sandefjord
18:00 CEST (UTC+2)	Gabrielsen 5'; Bindia (yellow card) 35'; Mendy (yellow card) 54' (goal) 60', 64'	Report	Furebotn 45'; Imingen (yellow card) 74'	Stadium: Komplett.no Arena; Attendance: 4,446; Referee: Tore Hansen

11 April 2015 2	Bodø/Glimt	1–3	Molde	Bodø
15:30 CEST (UTC+2)	Forren 78' (o.g.)	Report	Kamara 17', 60'; Elyounoussi 88'	Stadium: Aspmyra stadion Attendance: 2,962; Referee: Dag Vidar Hafsås

19 April 2015 3	Bodø/Glimt	2–4	Odd	Bodø
15:30 CEST (UTC+2)	Olsen 35' (yellow card) 43'; Badou 41'; Sané (yellow card) 79'	Report	Johnsen 10'; Hagen 38'; Nordkvelle 71'; Halvorsen 82'	Stadium: Aspmyra stadion Attendance: 2,461; Referee: Trygve Kjensli

26 April 2015 4	Sarpsborg 08	2–2	Bodø/Glimt	Sarpsborg
18:00 CEST (UTC+2)	Hansen 20'; Trondsen (yellow card) 42'; Ernemann 53'	Report	Saltnes (yellow card) 1'; Azemi 22' (pen.); Moe (yellow card) 51'; Hansen 76' (o.g.)	Stadium: Sarpsborg Stadion; Attendance: 3,471; Referee: Anders Johansen

30 April 2015 5	Bodø/Glimt	1–2	Haugesund	Bodø
18:00 CEST (UTC+2)	Cruz (yellow card) 80'; Azemi 84'	Report	Nilsen 26'; Gytkjær (yellow card) 39' (yellow-red card) 45+1'; Skjerve 54' (yellow card) 65' (yellow-red card) 69'	Stadium: Aspmyra Stadion; Attendance: 2,528; Referee: Martin Lundby

3 May 2015 6	Aalesund	2–0	Bodø/Glimt	Ålesund
15:30 CEST (UTC+2)	James 22'; Abdellaoue 63'	Report	Badou (yellow card) 30'; Chatto (yellow card) 45+3'	Stadium: Color Line Stadion; Attendance: 6,825; Referee: Tom Harald Hagen

10 May 2015 7	Bodø/Glimt	3–5	Strømsgodset	Bodø
18:00 CEST (UTC+2)	Moe 9'; Badou 32'; Olsen 67'	Report	Nana 5' (yellow card) 69'; Sørum 20'; Storflor 28'; Wikheim (yellow card) 39' (goal) 43'; Valsvik (yellow card) 81'; Kastrati 88'	Stadium: Aspmyra stadion Attendance: 2,387; Referee: Tommy Skjerven

13 May 2015 8	Start	1–1	Bodø/Glimt	Kristiansand
18:00 CEST (UTC+2)	Vikstøl 8'; Salvesen (yellow card) 67'	Report	Cruz 6'; Brix (yellow card) 20'; Sané (yellow card) 70'	Stadium: Sør Arena; Attendance: 4,900; Referee: Svein-Erik Edvartsen

16 May 2015 9	Bodø/Glimt	1–0	Tromsø	Bodø
15:30 CEST (UTC+2)	Cruz (yellow card) 41'; Badou 68'	Report	Antonsen (yellow card) 7'; Wangberg (yellow card) 84'	Stadium: Aspmyra stadion Attendance: 6,114; Referee: Ola Hobber Nilsen

25 May 2015 10	Lillestrøm	3–0	Bodø/Glimt	Lillestrøm
15:30 CEST (UTC+2)	Knudtzon 15'; Mikalsen (yellow card) 36'; Kolstad 41'; Fofana 87'	Report	Sané (yellow card) 55'; Olsen (yellow card) 85'	Stadium: Åråsen Stadion; Attendance: 5,003; Referee: Martin Lundby

31 May 2015 11	Bodø/Glimt	5–1	Mjøndalen	Bodø
18:00 CEST (UTC+2)	Furebotn 18'; Cruz 40'; Saltnes 61' (yellow card) 72'; Olsen 70', 86'	Report	Sundli 29'; Arneberg (yellow card) 60'	Stadium: Aspmyra stadion Attendance: 2,666; Referee: Ole Gya

7 June 2015 12	Stabæk	3–2	Bodø/Glimt	Bærum
18:00 CEST (UTC+2)	Jalasto 31'; Asante 59'; Gorozia 68'	Report	Sørloth 9'; Badou (yellow card) 75'; Brix (yellow card) 88'; Olsen 90+2'	Stadium: Nadderud Stadion; Attendance: 3,805; Referee: Espen Berntsen

21 June 2015 13	Bodø/Glimt	0–3	Viking	Bodø
15:30 CEST (UTC+2)	Saltnes (yellow card) 34'	Report	Berisha 14' de Lanlay 22'; Adegbenro 35'	Stadium: Aspmyra stadion Attendance: 2,660; Referee: Omar Rafiq

28 June 2015 14	Vålerenga	1–2	Bodø/Glimt	Oslo
20:00 CEST (UTC+2)	Holm 46'; Gunnarsson (yellow card) 56'	Report	Sørloth (yellow card) 30' (goal) 81'; Chatto (yellow card) 70'; Londak (yellow card) 90+1'; Olsen 90+2'	Stadium: Ullevål stadion Attendance: 7 765; Referee: Svein Oddvar Moen

5 July 2015 15	Bodø/Glimt	1–0	Rosenborg	Bodø
20:00 CEST (UTC+2)	Olsen 2' (yellow card) 90+4'; Chatto (yellow card) 13'; Londak (yellow card) 90+2'	Report	Svensson (yellow card) 26'; Søderlund (yellow card) 45+1'	Stadium: Aspmyra stadion Attendance: 3,960; Referee: Svein-Erik Edvartsen

12 July 2015 16	Mjøndalen	1–2	Bodø/Glimt	Mjøndalen
18:00 CEST (UTC+2)	Gauseth (yellow card) 44'; Aasmundsen 89'	Report	Azemi 12'; Badou (yellow card) 45'; Moe 52'	Stadium: Isachsen Stadion; Attendance: 2,048; Referee: Martin Lundby

18 July 2015 18	Molde	1–2	Bodø/Glimt	Molde
18:00 CEST (UTC+2)	Linnes 43'; Horvath (yellow card) 59'; Forren (yellow card) 90'; Singh (yellow card) 90+2' (yellow-red card)	Report	Valentin 21'; Konradsen 36'; Furebotn (yellow card) 57'	Stadium: Aker Stadion; Attendance: 9,573; Referee: Tom Harald Hagen

26 July 2015 17	Bodø/Glimt	1–0	Aalesund	Bodø
15:30 CEST (UTC+2)	Badou 63'	Report	Matland (yellow card) 39'	Stadium: Aspmyra stadion Attendance: 4,051; Referee: Tore Hansen

9 August 2015 19	Bodø/Glimt	5–1	Start	Bodø
18:00 CEST (UTC+2)	Sørloth 12', 66', 76', 90+2' (pen.); Olsen 45+1'; Sané (yellow card) 72'	Report	Salvesen 10'; Børufsen (yellow card) 45+1'; Kristjánsson (yellow card) 90+1'	Stadium: Aspmyra stadion Attendance: 3,674; Referee: Kai Erik Steen

15 August 2015 20	Viking	2–1	Bodø/Glimt	Stavanger
18:00 CEST (UTC+2)	Danielsen 63' (pen.); Böðvarsson (yellow card) 75'; Nisja 88'	Report	Sané (yellow card) 22'; Azemi 54'; Valentin (yellow card) 83'	Stadium: Viking Stadion; Attendance: 9,875; Referee: Trond Ivar Døvle

23 August 2015 21	Haugesund	2–4	Bodø/Glimt	Haugesund
18:00 CEST (UTC+2)	Andreassen 16'; Skjerve 65'	Report	Chatto 17'; Sørloth 30'; Bjørnbak 73' (o.g.); Valentin (yellow card) 78'; Olsen 84'	Stadium: Haugesund Stadion; Attendance: 5,827; Referee: Anders Johansen

30 August 2015 22	Bodø/Glimt	3–1	Sarpsborg 08	Bodø
18:00 CEST (UTC+2)	Sørloth 38', 89'; Jacobsen (yellow card) 81'; Olsen 88'	Report	Trondsen (yellow card) 55'; Zajić 61'; Kronberg (yellow card) 90+3'	Stadium: Aspmyra stadion Attendance: 3,230; Referee: Svein Oddvar Moen

13 September 2015 23	Odd	2–1	Bodø/Glimt	Skien
18:00 CEST (UTC+2)	Occéan 54' (pen.) (yellow card) 70'; Nordkvelle 78'	Report	Sané (yellow card) 53'; Valentin (yellow card) 69'; Chatto (yellow card) 72'; Tønne 86'	Stadium: Skagerak Arena; Attendance: 7,092; Referee: Ola Hobber Nilsen

20 September 2015 24	Bodø/Glimt	2–1	Sandefjord	Bodø
18:00 CEST (UTC+2)	Moe 3'; Furebotn 71'	Report	Fevang 17'; Juel-Nielsen (yellow card) 33'; Lamøy (yellow card) 80'	Stadium: Aspmyra stadion Attendance: 2,961; Referee: Tore Hansen

26 September 2015 25	Strømsgodset	3–1	Bodø/Glimt	Drammen
18:00 CEST (UTC+2)	Valsvik (yellow card) 23'; Hanin (yellow card) 53'; Londak 62' (o.g.); Pedersen 87'; Tagbajumi 89'	Report	Valentin (yellow card) 20'; Konradsen 90+1'	Stadium: Marienlyst Stadion; Attendance: 6,352; Referee: Svein-Erik Edvartsen

2 October 2015 26	Bodø/Glimt	1–1	Vålerenga	Bodø
19:00 CEST (UTC+2)	Olsen 78'	Report	Larsen (yellow card) 44'; Brown 60'	Stadium: Aspmyra stadion Attendance: 3,197; Referee: Kai Erik Steen

18 October 2015 27	Rosenborg	1–1	Bodø/Glimt	Trondheim
18:00 CEST (UTC+2)	Selnæs (yellow card) 48'; Søderlund 79'	Report	Chatto (yellow card) 45'; Olsen 54'; Furebotn (yellow card) 58'	Stadium: Lerkendal Stadion; Attendance: 20,600; Referee: Ola Hobber Nilsen

25 October 2015 28	Bodø/Glimt	0–3	Lillestrøm	Bodø
18:00 CET (UTC+1)	Jacobsen (yellow card) 48'; Moe (red card) 75'; Furebotn (yellow card) 76'; Saltnes (yellow card) 80'	Report	Vilhjálmsson 32' (yellow card) 76'; Martin (yellow card) 76'; Friday 77', 90'	Stadium: Aspmyra stadion Attendance: 2,625; Referee: Omar Rafiq

1 November 2015 29	Tromsø	3–1	Bodø/Glimt	Tromsø
18:00 CET (UTC+1)	Ondrášek 40', 86' (yellow card) 68'; Ingebrigtsen 51'; Oršulić (yellow card) 54'	Report	Sørloth 30' (yellow card) 64'; Sané (yellow card) 68'; Jacobsen (yellow card) 88'	Stadium: Alfheim Stadion; Attendance: 5,862; Referee: Tom Harald Hagen

8 November 2015 30	Bodø/Glimt	6–1	Stabæk	Bodø
18:00 CET (UTC+1)	Brix (yellow card) 15'; Olsen 47'; Konradsen 51', 54'; Sørloth 64' (pen.), 67', 88'; Cruz (yellow card) 85'	Report	El Ghanassy 14'	Stadium: Aspmyra stadion Attendance: 2,286; Referee: Tommy Skjerven

==== Table ====
Pos	Team	Pld	W	D	L	GF	GA	GD	Pts
7	Vålerenga	30	14	7	9	49	41	+8	49
8	Lillestrøm (Note: Lillestrøm started the season with a one point deduction due to poor financial reporting.)	30	12	9	9	45	43	+2	44
9	Bodø/Glimt	30	12	4	14	53	56	−3	40
10	Aalesund	30	11	5	14	42	57	−15	38
11	Sarpsborg 08	30	8	10	12	37	49	−12	34

Source: Football Association of Norway (in Norwegian), Soccerway
Rules for classification: 1) Points; 2) Goal difference; 3) Goals scored; 4) Head-to-head points; 5) Head-to-head goal difference; 6) Head-to-head away goals scored (between two teams).

=== Norwegian Cup ===
22 April 2015 First Round	Kirkenes	0–6	Bodø/Glimt	Kirkenes
17:00 CEST (UTC+2)		Report	Azemi 7', 29', 40'; D.Mikkelsen 39' (o.g.); Saltnes 51'; Brix (red card) 58'; Konradsen (yellow card) 73' (goal) 85'	Stadium: Kirkenes Stadion; Attendance: 350; Referee: Tom Egil Olsen

6 May 2015 Second Round	Mjølner	0–1	Bodø/Glimt	Narvik
18:00 CEST (UTC+2)	M.Candemir (yellow card) 59'; H.Larsen (yellow card) 90+2'	Report	Azemi 76'; Badou (yellow card) 90+2'	Stadium: Narvik Stadion; Attendance: 681; Referee: Geir-Oskar Isaksen

4 June 2015 Third Round	Tromsdalen	6–2	Bodø/Glimt	Tromsø
18:00 CEST (UTC+2)	T.Mienna 16'; Lysvoll 25', 52', (penalty missed) 61'; Kjæve 40'; Bertheussen (yellow card) 64'; S.Jakobsen 68'; J.Vik (yellow card) 89'; Ahamed 90'	Report	Cruz (penalty missed) 31'; Azemi 45'; Sørloth 61'; Sané (yellow card) 62'; Valentin (yellow card) 62'; Saltnes (yellow card) 67'	Stadium: Tromsdalen Stadion; Attendance: 718; Referee: Steinar Hauge

== Squad statistics ==
As of match played 8 November 2015

=== Appearances and goals ===
No.	Pos	Nat	Player	Total		Tippeligaen		Norwegian Cup	
No.	Pos	Nat	Player	Apps	Goals	Apps	Goals	Apps	Goals
1	GK	(Estonia) EST	Pavel Londak	23	0	22	0	1	0
2	DF	(Norway) NOR	Ruben Imingen	2	0	2	0	0	0
3	DF	(United States) USA	Zarek Valentin	27	1	23+1	1	3	0
5	MF	(Norway) NOR	Thomas Jacobsen	31	0	27+1	0	3	0
6	MF	(Norway) NOR	Anders Karlsen	19	0	3+16	0	0	0
8	MF	(Norway) NOR	Henrik Furebotn	28	3	26	3	2	0
10	FW	(Norway) NOR	Fitim Azemi	33	9	27+3	4	2+1	5
11	FW	(Norway) NOR	Alexander Sørloth	29	14	19+7	13	1+2	1
14	MF	(Norway) NOR	Ulrik Saltnes	20	2	16+1	1	2+1	1
15	MF	(Nigeria) NGA	Dominic Chatto	21	1	16+3	1	2	0
16	MF	(Norway) NOR	Morten Konradsen	29	5	15+12	4	1+1	1
18	DF	(Norway) NOR	Brede Moe	29	3	27	3	2	0
19	MF	(Norway) NOR	Erik Tønne	9	1	2+7	1	0	0
21	DF	(Norway) NOR	Daniel Edvardsen	18	0	7+10	0	1	0
23	DF	(Senegal) SEN	Vieux Sané	26	0	25	0	1	0
24	DF	(Norway) NOR	Kristian Brix	21	0	13+6	0	2	0
25	GK	(Norway) NOR	Lasse Staw	11	0	8+1	0	2	0
26	FW	(United States) USA	Danny Cruz	16	2	8+7	2	1	0
27	MF	(Norway) NOR	Patrick Berg	5	0	0+4	0	0+1	0
29	DF	(Norway) NOR	Vebjørn Vinje	3	0	0+1	0	1+1	0
30	FW	(Norway) NOR	Trond Olsen	31	13	28+1	13	1+1	0
Players away from Bodø/Glimt on loan:
20	FW	(Norway) NOR	Ulrik Berglann	7	0	1+3	0	3	0
Players who appeared for Bodø/Glimt no longer at the club:
4	DF	(Portugal) POR	Joshua Silva	1	0	0	0	0+1	0
7	MF	(Senegal) SEN	Badou	18	4	15+1	4	2	0

=== Goal scorers ===
Place	Position	Nation	Number	Name	Tippeligaen	Norwegian Cup	Total
1	FW	(Norway)	11	Alexander Sørloth	13	1	14
2	FW	(Norway)	30	Trond Olsen	13	0	13
3	FW	(Norway)	10	Fitim Azemi	4	5	9
4	MF	(Norway)	16	Morten Konradsen	4	1	5
5	MF	(Senegal)	7	Badou	4	0	4
6	DF	(Norway)	18	Brede Moe	3	0	3
6	MF	(Norway)	8	Henrik Furebotn	3	0	3
8	FW	(United States)	26	Danny Cruz	2	0	2
8	MF	(Norway)	14	Ulrik Saltnes	1	1	2
10	DF	(United States)	3	Zarek Valentin	1	0	1
10	MF	(Nigeria)	15	Dominic Chatto	1	0	1
10	MF	(Norway)	19	Erik Tønne	1	0	1
10				Own goal	3	1	4
				TOTALS	53	9	62

=== Clean sheets ===
Place	Position	Nation	Number	Name	Tippeligaen	Norwegian Cup	Total
1	GK	(Norway)	25	Lasse Staw	1	2	3
2	GK	(Estonia)	1	Pavel Londak	2	0	2
				TOTALS	3	2	5

=== Disciplinary record ===
Number	Nation	Position	Name	Tippeligaen		Norwegian Cup		Total	
Number	Nation	Position	Name	Booked	Sent off (straight red)	Booked	Sent off (straight red)	Booked	Sent off (straight red)
1	(Estonia)	GK	Pavel Londak	2	0	0	0	2	0
2	(Norway)	DF	Ruben Imingen	1	0	0	0	1	0
3	(United States)	DF	Zarek Valentin	4	0	1	0	5	0
5	(Norway)	MF	Thomas Jacobsen	3	0	0	0	3	0
8	(Norway)	MF	Henrik Furebotn	2	0	0	0	2	0
11	(Norway)	FW	Alexander Sørloth	2	0	0	0	2	0
14	(Norway)	MF	Ulrik Saltnes	4	0	1	0	5	0
15	(Nigeria)	MF	Dominic Chatto	5	0	0	0	5	0
16	(Norway)	MF	Morten Konradsen	0	0	1	0	1	0
18	(Norway)	DF	Brede Moe	1	1	0	0	1	1
23	(Senegal)	MF	Vieux Sané	7	0	1	0	8	0
24	(Norway)	DF	Kristian Brix	3	0	0	1	3	1
26	(United States)	FW	Danny Cruz	3	0	0	0	3	0
30	(Norway)	FW	Trond Olsen	3	0	0	0	3	0
Players away on loan:
Players who appeared for Bodø/Glimt no longer at the club:
7	(Senegal)	MF	Badou	3	0	1	0	4	0
			TOTALS	43	1	5	1	48	2
