= 2017 FK Bodø/Glimt season =

Bodø/Glimt
2017 season
- President: Mads Torrissen
- Manager: Aasmund Bjørkan
- Stadium: Aspmyra Stadion
- Norwegian First Division: 1st (promoted)
- Norwegian Cup: Third round vs Elverum
- Top goalscorer: League: Kristian Opseth (28); All: Kristian Opseth (29)
- Highest home attendance: 3,272 vs Ull/Kisa (16 May 2017)
- Lowest home attendance: 614 vs Elverum (31 May 2017)
- Average home league attendance: 2,460 (29 October 2017)
Home colours	Away colours

The 2017 season was Bodø/Glimt's first season back in the Norwegian First Division since 2013. Bodø/Glimt finished the season as Champions, earning promotion back to the Tippeligaen, whilst in the Norwegian Cup, they reached the third round before defeat to Elverum.

== Squad ==
As of match played 5 November 2017

No.	Name	Nationality	Position	Date of birth (age)	Signed from	Signed in	Contract ends	Apps.	Goals
Goalkeepers
1	Simon Thomas	(Canada)	GK	12 April 1990 (aged 27)	Strømmen	2016		24	0
12	Jonas Ueland Kolstad	(Norway)	GK	21 September 1976 (aged 41)	Årvoll	2002		81	0
25	Ricardo	(Brazil)	GK	18 February 1993 (aged 24)	RoPS	2017		22	0
Defenders
2	Marius Lode	(Norway)	DF	11 March 1993 (aged 24)	Bryne	2017		32	0
3	Emil Jonassen	(Norway)	DF	17 February 1993 (aged 24)	Odd	2016		59	2
4	Martin Bjørnbak	(Norway)	DF	22 March 1992 (aged 25)	Haugesund	2017		29	4
8	Daniel Edvardsen	(Norway)	DF	31 August 1991 (aged 26)	Harstad	2014		54	2
18	Brede Moe	(Norway)	DF	15 December 1991 (aged 25)	Rosenborg	2015		6	1
21	Erlend Dahl Reitan	(Norway)	DF	11 September 1997 (aged 20)	loan from Rosenborg	2017	2017	13	2
24	Fredrik André Bjørkan	(Norway)	DF	21 August 1998 (aged 19)	Youth team	2016		12	2
Midfielders
5	Thomas Jacobsen	(Norway)	MF	16 September 1983 (aged 34)	Lyn	2010		273	5
6	Vegard Moberg	(Norway)	MF	23 January 1991 (aged 26)	Sogndal	2017		30	8
7	Thomas Drage	(Norway)	MF	20 February 1992 (aged 25)	Falkenberg	2017		21	3
10	José Ángel	(Spain)	MF	21 June 1992 (aged 25)	Almería	2017		25	1
14	Ulrik Saltnes	(Norway)	MF	10 November 1992 (aged 24)	Brønnøysund	2011		116	22
23	Oliver Sigurjónsson	(Iceland)	MF	3 March 1995 (aged 22)	Breiðablik	2017		2	0
27	Patrick Berg	(Norway)	MF	24 November 1997 (aged 19)	Youth team	2014		48	2
33	Håkon Evjen	(Norway)	MF	14 February 2000 (aged 17)	Mjølner	2017		3	0
Forwards
15	Runar Hauge	(Norway)	FW	1 September 2001 (aged 16)	Youth team	2017		1	0
20	Amor Layouni	(Sweden)	FW	3 October 1992 (aged 25)	Elverum	2017		9	2
22	Kristian Opseth	(Norway)	FW	6 January 1990 (aged 27)	Sogndal	2017		32	29
28	William Arne Hanssen	(Norway)	FW	10 May 1998 (aged 19)	Youth team	2017		5	0
30	Trond Olsen	(Norway)	FW	5 February 1984 (aged 33)	Viking	2014		310	91
31	Jens Petter Hauge	(Norway)	FW	12 October 1999 (aged 18)	Youth team	2016		52	7
Out on loan
Players who left club during season
9	Kachi	(Nigeria)	FW	5 May 1997 (aged 20)	loan from Sarpsborg 08	2017	2017	11	4
11	Nemanja Mladenović	(Serbia)	MF	3 March 1993 (aged 24)	Metalac	2017		6	2
16	Morten Konradsen	(Norway)	MF	3 May 1996 (aged 21)	Youth team	2012		77	9
17	Mathias Normann	(Norway)	MF	28 May 1996 (aged 21)	Lofoten	2012		42	3
19	Joachim Osvold	(Norway)	FW	23 September 1994 (aged 23)	Rot-Weiss Essen	2016		11	6
23	Aleksander Torvanger	(Norway)	DF	14 November 1991 (aged 25)	Harstad	2017		2	0
34	Niklas Antonsen	(Norway)	FW	29 April 1998 (aged 19)	Youth team	2017		1	0

== Transfers ==
=== In ===
Date	Position	Nationality	Name	From	Fee	Ref.
26 January 2017	MF	(Serbia)	Nemanja Mladenović	Metalac	Undisclosed	
2 February 2017	DF	(Norway)	Marius Lode	Bryne	Undisclosed	
16 March 2017	MF	(Norway)	Thomas Drage	Falkenberg	Free	
17 March 2017	MF	(Spain)	José Ángel	Almería	Free	
18 March 2017	GK	(Brazil)	Ricardo	RoPS	Undisclosed	
22 March 2017	MF	(Norway)	Vegard Moberg	Sogndal	Undisclosed	
19 June 2017	FW	(Norway)	Kristian Opseth	Sogndal	Undisclosed	
21 June 2017	FW	(Sweden)	Amor Layouni	Elverum	Undisclosed	
25 July 2017	FW	(Iceland)	Oliver Sigurjónsson	Breiðablik	Undisclosed	

=== Loans in ===
Date from	Position	Nationality	Name	From	Date to	Ref.
5 January 2017	FW	(Norway)	Kristian Opseth	Sogndal	19 June 2017	
31 March 2017	FW	(Nigeria)	Kachi	Sarpsborg 08	19 July 2017	
12 July 2017	DF	(Norway)	Erlend Dahl Reitan	Rosenborg	End of season	

=== Out ===
Date	Position	Nationality	Name	To	Fee	Ref.
23 January 2017	FW	(Norway)	Fitim Azemi	Maccabi Haifa	Undisclosed	
31 January 2017	MF	(Egypt)	Alexander Jakobsen	Viborg	Undisclosed	
16 June 2017	DF	(Norway)	Aleksander Torvanger	Mjølner	Undisclosed	
20 July 2017	MF	(Norway)	Mathias Normann	Brighton & Hove Albion	Undisclosed	
1 August 2017	FW	(Norway)	Joachim Osvold	Levanger	Undisclosed	
1 August 2017	FW	(Norway)	Niklas Antonsen	Harstad	Undisclosed	

=== Released ===
Date	Position	Nationality	Name	Joined	Date
3 August 2017	MF	(Serbia)	Nemanja Mladenović	Zemun	
15 November 2017	DF	(Norway)	Daniel Edvardsen	Sandnes Ulf	20 December 2017
31 December 2017	GK	(Norway)	Jonas Ueland Kolstad	Retired	

== Competitions ==
=== Norwegian First Division ===
==== Results summary ====
Overall								Home						Away					
Pld	W	D	L	GF	GA	GD	Pts	W	D	L	GF	GA	GD	W	D	L	GF	GA	GD
30	22	5	3	83	33	+50	71	12	2	1	47	15	+32	10	3	2	36	18	+18

Last updated: 5 November 2017.
Source: see below

==== Results by round ====
Round	1	2	3	4	5	6	7	8	9	10	11	12	13	14	15	16	17	18	19	20	21	22	23	24	25	26	27	28	29	30
Ground	H	A	H	A	H	A	A	H	A	H	A	H	A	H	A	H	A	H	A	H	A	H	A	H	A	H	H	A	H	A
Result	W	D	W	W	W	W	L	W	W	W	L	W	W	W	D	D	W	W	W	W	W	D	D	W	W	W	L	W	W	W
Position	3	5	2	1	1	1	3	2	1	1	1	1	1	1	1	1	1	1	1	1	1	1	1	1	1	1	1	1	1	1

Updated to match(es) played on 5 November 2017. Source: see below
A = Away; H = Home; W = Win; D = Draw; L = Loss

==== Results ====
4 April 2017 1	Bodø/Glimt	3–2	Kongsvinger	Bodø
19:00 CEST (UTC+2)	Ángel (yellow card) 23'; Olsen 48'; Opseth 60', 64'; Normann (yellow card) 77'	Report	J.Kolstad (yellow card) 5'; Güven 33', 90+1'; Ellingsen (yellow card) 42'	Stadium: Aspmyra stadion Attendance: 2,170; Referee: Sigurd Smehus Kringstad

9 April 2017 2	Åsane	1–1	Bodø/Glimt	Åsane
17:00 CEST (UTC+2)	K.Stephensen 52'; E.Østgaard (yellow card) 90+1'; S.Hagos (yellow card) 90+2'	Report	Moberg (yellow card) 87'; Bjørnbak 90+4'	Stadium: Myrdal Stadion; Attendance: 778; Referee: Mohammad Usman Aslam

17 April 2017 3	Bodø/Glimt	5–0	Elverum	Bodø
18:00 CEST (UTC+2)	Kachi 9'; Olsen 66', 69'; Opseth 75'; Mladenović 77'	Report	I.Cukovic (yellow card) 32'; Solli (yellow card) 54'; A.Círak (yellow card) 60'	Stadium: Aspmyra stadion Attendance: 2,752; Referee: Sivert Amland

23 April 2017 4	Fredrikstad	0–1	Bodø/Glimt	Fredrikstad
15:00 CEST (UTC+2)		Report	Opseth 63'; Berg (yellow card) 79'	Stadium: Fredrikstad Stadion; Attendance: 4,008; Referee: Torkjell Trædal

2 May 2017 5	Bodø/Glimt	3–2	Start	Bodø
19:00 CEST (UTC+2)	Moberg 25', 35'; Bjørnbak (yellow card) 43' (yellow-red card) 90+3'; Normann (yellow card) 89'; Opdal 90' (o.g.)	Report	N'Guessan (yellow card) 60' (goal) 68'; Vorthoren 62'; Larsen (yellow card) 83'; Kristjánsson (yellow card) 89'	Stadium: Aspmyra stadion Attendance: 2,667; Referee: Christian Moen

7 May 2017 6	Tromsdalen	2–3	Bodø/Glimt	Tromsø
15:30 CEST (UTC+2)	Vibe 6'; Ahamed 79'; Nilsen (yellow card) 90'	Report	Moberg 11', 62'; Opseth 23'; Normann (yellow card) 81'	Stadium: TUIL Arena; Attendance: 458; Referee: Bjørn Hansen

13 May 2017 7	Sandnes Ulf	3–0	Bodø/Glimt	Sandnes
18:00 CEST (UTC+2)	Sellin 25'; Vevatne (yellow card) 68'; T.Kristoffersen 73'; Skartun (yellow card) 77'; Eriksen 90'	Report		Stadium: Sandnes Stadion; Attendance: 1,910; Referee: Jan Morten Tennøy

16 May 2017 8	Bodø/Glimt	3–1	Ull/Kisa	Bodø
18:00 CEST (UTC+2)	Drage 37'; Opseth 52'; Saltnes 88'	Report	Langås 75'; Ødemarksbakken (yellow card) 83'; A.Aalbu (yellow card) 89'	Stadium: Aspmyra stadion Attendance: 3,272; Referee: Sigurd Smehus Kringstad

21 May 2017 9	Florø	1–2	Bodø/Glimt	Florø
18:00 CEST (UTC+2)	Benmoussa (yellow card) 54' (yellow-red card) 63' (goal) 63' (pen.); Muhammed (yellow card) 70'	Report	Opseth 67'; Ángel (red card) 71'; Olsen 82'	Stadium: Florø Stadion; Attendance: 1,205; Referee: Anders Gjermshus

28 May 2017 10	Bodø/Glimt	1–0	Mjøndalen	Bodø
18:00 CEST (UTC+2)	Saltnes 72'; Moberg (yellow card) 89'; Bjørkan (yellow card) 90'	Report		Stadium: Aspmyra stadion Attendance: 2,576; Referee: Steinar Hauge

4 June 2017 11	Ranheim	2–1	Bodø/Glimt	Trondheim
18:00 CEST (UTC+2)	Lillebo 3'; Løkberg (yellow card) 5'; Rismark 14'; Gjertsen (yellow card) 88'	Report	Opseth 9'; Lode (yellow card) 53'; Jacobsen (yellow card) 60'; Saltnes (yellow card) 88'; Kachi (yellow card) 90+2'	Stadium: EXTRA Arena; Attendance: 706; Referee: Sivert Amland

11 June 2017 12	Bodø/Glimt	4–0	Jerv	Bodø
15:30 CEST (UTC+2)	Opseth 3'; Jacobsen (yellow card) 32'; Olsen 40'; Edvardsen 79'; Kachi 88'	Report	E.Knudsen (yellow card) 77'	Stadium: Aspmyra stadion Attendance: 2,402; Referee: Mads Skarsem

17 June 2017 13	Arendal	1–3	Bodø/Glimt	Arendal
15:00 CEST (UTC+2)	J.Rasmussen 23' (pen.); Henanger (yellow card) 61'; Stray (yellow card) 68'	Report	Moberg 34'; Opseth 39'; Bjørnbak 73'	Stadium: Arendal Idrettspark; Attendance: 716; Referee: Per Erik Haugen

25 June 2017 14	Bodø/Glimt	4–3	Strømmen	Bodø
18:00 CEST (UTC+2)	Saltnes (penalty missed) 21' 81', 90+3'; Ángel (yellow card) 34'; Opseth 60'; Osvold 90+1'	Report	Øby 6'; U.Ness 27' (yellow card) 40'; T.Trautner (yellow card) 61'; Blårud 68'; T.Lange (yellow card) 78'	Stadium: Aspmyra stadion Attendance: 2,670; Referee: Sivert Amland

2 July 2017 15	Levanger	1–1	Bodø/Glimt	Levanger
18:00 CEST (UTC+2)	H.Tadesse 4'; Udo (yellow card) 37'; Rønning (yellow card) 38'	Report	Saltnes 41'; Bjørkan (yellow card) 72'; Jonassen (yellow card) 77'; Bjørnbak (yellow card) 90'	Stadium: Tobb Arena; Attendance: 1,138; Referee: Steinar Hauge

22 July 2017 16	Bodø/Glimt	3–3	Ranheim	Bodø
18:00 CEST (UTC+2)	Saltnes 16'; Olsen 77'; Osvold 89'	Report	Reginiussen 25', 90+3'; Blakstad (yellow card) 56'; Lillebo 80'	Stadium: Aspmyra stadion Attendance: 2,732; Referee: Jan Morten Tennøy

29 July 2017 17	Mjøndalen	1–2	Bodø/Glimt	Mjøndalen
18:00 CEST (UTC+2)	Lindseth (yellow card) 36'; Boye (yellow card) 76' (goal) 88'	Report	Lode (yellow card) 7'; Saltnes 11'; Opseth 34'; Hauge (yellow card) 68'	Stadium: Consto Arena; Attendance: 1,753; Referee: Christian Moen

6 August 2017 18	Bodø/Glimt	5–0	Arendal	Bodø
18:00 CEST (UTC+2)	Olsen 9'; Saltnes 49' (pen.); Ángel (yellow card) 53'; Opseth 66', 73', 74'	Report	Rnkovic (yellow card) 22'; Pepa (yellow card) 49'	Stadium: Aspmyra stadion Attendance: 2,665; Referee: Mads Skarsem

13 August 2017 19	Elverum	0–4	Bodø/Glimt	Elverum
15:00 CEST (UTC+2)		Report	Opseth 7', 35'; Saltnes 55'; Moberg 84'	Stadium: Elverum Stadion; Attendance: 764; Referee: Omar Rafiq

16 August 2017 20	Bodø/Glimt	4–0	Fredrikstad	Bodø
19:00 CEST (UTC+2)	Moberg 1'; Olsen 9', 71'; Saltnes 67'	Report		Stadium: Aspmyra stadion Attendance: 2,654; Referee: Torkjell Trædal

22 August 2017 21	Kongsvinger	0–1	Bodø/Glimt	Kongsvinger
19:00 CEST (UTC+2)	Murnane (yellow card) 67'	Report	Opseth 53'; Layouni (yellow card) 80'; Bjørkan (yellow card) 90+4'	Stadium: Gjemselund Stadion; Attendance: 1,483; Referee: Sivert Amland

6 September 2017 22	Bodø/Glimt	0–0	Sandnes Ulf	Bodø
19:00 CEST (UTC+2)	Saltnes (yellow card) 62'	Report	A.Kryger (yellow card) 26'; T.Kristoffersen (yellow card) 28'; Geertsen (yellow card) 70'	Stadium: Aspmyra stadion Attendance: 2,893; Referee: Kristoffer Hagenes

12 September 2017 23	Start	2–2	Bodø/Glimt	Kristiansand
19:00 CEST (UTC+2)	Skålevik 10' (yellow card) 82'; Lowe (yellow card) 16' (yellow-red card) 89'; Aase (yellow card) 55'; Finnbogason 84'	Report	Saltnes (penalty missed) 16'; Ángel (yellow card) 46'; Bjørnbak 56' (yellow card) 69'; Moberg (yellow card) 57'; Opseth 80'; Ricardo (yellow card) 90+5'	Stadium: Sør Arena; Attendance: 3,471; Referee: Christian Moen

19 September 2017 24	Bodø/Glimt	1–0	Tromsdalen	Bodø
19:00 CEST (UTC+2)	Berg (yellow card) 29'; Reitan 75' (yellow card) 79'; Bjørnbak (yellow card) 90+7'	Report	Ahamed (yellow card) 6'; Lysvoll (yellow card) 53'; Matland (yellow card) 76'	Stadium: Aspmyra stadion Attendance: 2,703; Referee: Mohammad Usman Aslam

26 September 2017 25	Ull/Kisa	2–5	Bodø/Glimt	Jessheim
19:00 CEST (UTC+2)	Grødem (yellow card) 26'; A.Aalbu 80', 90+1'	Report	Opseth 4', 6', 36'; Layouni (yellow card) 23' (goal) 31'; Olsen 24'	Stadium: Jessheim Stadion; Attendance: 530; Referee: Jan Morten Tennøy

1 October 2017 26	Bodø/Glimt	4–1	Florø	Bodø
18:00 CEST (UTC+2)	Opseth 18' (pen.); Moberg 21'; Layouni 29'; Ángel (yellow card) 73'; Moe 90'	Report	L.Jeggo 64'	Stadium: Aspmyra stadion Attendance: 3,014; Referee: Kim Rune Borgersen

15 October 2017 27	Bodø/Glimt	1–3	Levanger	Bodø
15:00 CEST (UTC+2)	Edvardsen (yellow card) 26'; Bjørnbak 75' (pen.); Opseth (yellow card) 84'; Saltnes (yellow card) 90'	Report	Stene 30', 40', 57'; K.Nyborg (yellow card) 86'	Stadium: Aspmyra stadion Attendance: 1,835; Referee: Marius Hansen Grøtta

22 October 2017 28	Jerv	1–4	Bodø/Glimt	Grimstad
13:00 CEST (UTC+2)	Danso (yellow card) 49'; Reitan 62' (o.g.); I.Gomes (yellow card) 78'; Andersen (yellow card) 85'	Report	Drage 17'; Opseth 50', 75'; Ángel (yellow card) 64'; Bjørkan 67'; Evjen (yellow card) 80'	Stadium: J.J. Ugland Stadion – Levermyr; Attendance: 1,173; Referee: Mads Skarsem

29 October 2017 29	Bodø/Glimt	6–0	Åsane	Bodø
12:00 CET (UTC+1)	Saltnes 16', 57', 90+3'; Opseth 26', 58'; Hauge 34'; Ángel (yellow card) 42'	Report		Stadium: Aspmyra stadion Attendance: 1,742; Referee: Torkjell Trædal

5 November 2017 30	Strømmen	1–6	Bodø/Glimt	Strømmen
13:00 CET (UTC+1)	U.Ness 9'; T.Lange (yellow card) 90+1'	Report	Bjørkan 2'; Drage 19'; Hauge 58'; Jonassen 70'; Reitan 78'; Opseth 82'	Stadium: Strømmen Stadion; Attendance: 591; Referee: Kim Rune Borgersen

==== Table ====
Pos	Team	Pld	W	D	L	GF	GA	GD	Pts	Promotion, qualification or relegation
1	Bodø/Glimt (C, P)	30	22	5	3	83	33	+50	71	Promotion to Eliteserien
2	Start (P)	30	16	7	7	57	36	+21	55	Promotion to Eliteserien
3	Mjøndalen	30	15	7	8	56	37	+19	52	Qualification for the promotion play-offs
4	Ranheim (O, P)	30	15	7	8	48	39	+9	52	Qualification for the promotion play-offs
5	Sandnes Ulf	30	14	9	7	44	39	+5	51	Qualification for the promotion play-offs

Source: nifs.no (in Norwegian), Soccerway
Rules for classification: 1) Points; 2) Goal difference; 3) Goals scored; 4) Head-to-head points; 5) Head-to-head goal difference; 6) Head-to-head away goals scored (only if between two teams); 7) Head-to-head goals scored; 8) Play-off (only used to decide champions or relegation).
(C) Champions; (O) Play-off winners; (P) Promoted

=== Norwegian Cup ===
26 April 2017 First Round	Fauske/Sprint	0–7	Bodø/Glimt	Fauske
18:00 CEST (UTC+2)	J.Lund (penalty missed) 46'; M.Halvorsen (yellow card) 65'	Report	Saltnes 17'; Opseth 24'; Edvardsen 33'; Osvold 76'; Ángel 78'; Kachi 84'; Mladenović 90+2'	Stadium: Fauske Kunstgress; Attendance: 725; Referee: Ali Al-Hatem

24 May 2017 Second Round	Sortland	1–3	Bodø/Glimt	Sortland
18:00 CEST (UTC+2)	T.Ellingsen 61'; B.Skog (yellow card) 77'	Report	Saltnes 22' (pen.); Ángel (yellow card) 34'; Osvold 74'; Normann (yellow card) 76'; Kachi 87' (yellow card) 90+3'	Stadium: Blåbyhallen; Attendance: 1,400; Referee: Henrik Andreas Grenå Pettersen

31 May 2017 Third Round	Bodø/Glimt	2–2 (a.e.t.) (6–7 p)	Elverum	Bodø
18:00 CEST (UTC+2)	Olsen (yellow card) 60'; Jacobsen (yellow card) 70'; Lode (yellow card) 88'; Osvold 90+4'; Saltnes 99'	Report	R.Svindland (yellow card) 67'; Layouni 75'; Moggia 113'	Stadium: Aspmyra Stadion; Attendance: 614; Referee: Marius Hansen Grøtta
	Penalties
	Ángel (penalty scored); Moberg (penalty scored); Bjørnbak (penalty scored); Saltnes (penalty scored); Opseth (penalty scored); Osvold (penalty scored); Jacobsen (penalty missed)		(penalty scored) Hjelmseth; (penalty scored) Sulaka; (penalty scored) Cukovic; (penalty scored) Moggia; (penalty scored) Rønes; (penalty scored) Cirak; (penalty scored) Simenstad

== Squad statistics ==
As of match played 5 November 2017

=== Appearances and goals ===
No.	Pos	Nat	Player	Total		Norwegian First Division		Norwegian Cup	
No.	Pos	Nat	Player	Apps	Goals	Apps	Goals	Apps	Goals
1	GK	(Canada) CAN	Simon Thomas	11	0	8	0	3	0
2	DF	(Norway) NOR	Marius Lode	32	0	28+1	0	2+1	0
3	DF	(Norway) NOR	Emil Jonassen	33	1	30	1	3	0
4	DF	(Norway) NOR	Martin Bjørnbak	29	4	28	4	1	0
5	MF	(Norway) NOR	Thomas Jacobsen	20	0	19	0	1	0
6	MF	(Norway) NOR	Vegard Moberg	30	8	28	8	1+1	0
7	MF	(Norway) NOR	Thomas Drage	21	3	13+8	3	0	0
8	DF	(Norway) NOR	Daniel Edvardsen	12	2	4+5	1	3	1
10	MF	(Spain) ESP	José Ángel	25	1	20+2	0	3	1
14	MF	(Norway) NOR	Ulrik Saltnes	30	16	24+3	13	2+1	3
15	FW	(Norway) NOR	Runar Hauge	1	0	0+1	0	0	0
18	DF	(Norway) NOR	Brede Moe	6	1	5+1	1	0	0
20	FW	(Sweden) SWE	Amor Layouni	9	2	4+5	2	0	0
21	DF	(Norway) NOR	Erlend Dahl Reitan	13	2	9+4	2	0	0
22	FW	(Norway) NOR	Kristian Opseth	32	29	27+3	28	1+1	1
23	MF	(Iceland) ISL	Oliver Sigurjónsson	2	0	0+2	0	0	0
24	DF	(Norway) NOR	Fredrik André Bjørkan	12	2	6+6	2	0	0
25	GK	(Brazil) BRA	Ricardo	22	0	22	0	0	0
27	MF	(Norway) NOR	Patrick Berg	19	0	9+8	0	1+1	0
28	FW	(Norway) NOR	William Arne Hanssen	3	0	0+3	0	0	0
30	FW	(Norway) NOR	Trond Olsen	28	10	24+3	10	1	0
31	FW	(Norway) NOR	Jens Petter Hauge	28	2	12+16	2	0	0
33	MF	(Norway) NOR	Håkon Evjen	3	0	0+3	0	0	0
Players away from Bodø/Glimt on loan:
Players who appeared for Bodø/Glimt no longer at the club:
9	FW	(Nigeria) NGA	Kachi	11	4	2+6	2	2+1	2
11	FW	(Serbia) SRB	Nemanja Mladenović	6	2	0+3	1	3	1
16	MF	(Norway) NOR	Morten Konradsen	2	0	0	0	2	0
17	MF	(Norway) NOR	Mathias Normann	8	0	7	0	0+1	0
19	FW	(Norway) NOR	Joachim Osvold	9	5	1+5	2	2+1	3
23	DF	(Norway) NOR	Aleksander Torvanger	2	0	0	0	2	0
34	FW	(Norway) NOR	Niklas Antonsen	1	0	0	0	0+1	0

=== Goal scorers ===
Place	Position	Nation	Number	Name	Norwegian First Division	Norwegian Cup	Total
1	FW	(Norway)	22	Kristian Opseth	28	1	29
2	MF	(Norway)	14	Ulrik Saltnes	13	3	16
3	FW	(Norway)	30	Trond Olsen	10	0	10
4	MF	(Norway)	6	Vegard Moberg	8	0	8
5	FW	(Norway)	19	Joachim Osvold	2	3	5
6	DF	(Norway)	4	Martin Bjørnbak	4	0	4
6	FW	(Nigeria)	9	Kachi	2	2	4
8	MF	(Norway)	7	Thomas Drage	3	0	3
9	DF	(Norway)	21	Erlend Dahl Reitan	2	0	2
9	FW	(Sweden)	20	Amor Layouni	2	0	2
9	DF	(Norway)	24	Fredrik André Bjørkan	2	0	2
9	FW	(Norway)	31	Jens Petter Hauge	2	0	2
9	DF	(Norway)	8	Daniel Edvardsen	1	1	2
9	MF	(Serbia)	11	Nemanja Mladenović	1	1	2
15	DF	(Norway)	18	Brede Moe	1	0	1
15	DF	(Norway)	3	Emil Jonassen	1	0	1
15	MF	(Spain)	10	José Ángel	0	1	1
15				Own goal	1	0	1
				TOTALS	83	12	95

=== Clean sheets ===
Place	Position	Nation	Number	Name	Norwegian First Division	Norwegian Cup	Total
1	GK	(Brazil)	25	Ricardo	9	0	9
2	GK	(Canada)	1	Simon Thomas	2	1	3
				TOTALS	11	1	12

=== Disciplinary record ===
Number	Nation	Position	Name	Norwegian First Division		Norwegian Cup		Total	
Number	Nation	Position	Name	Booked	Sent off (straight red)	Booked	Sent off (straight red)	Booked	Sent off (straight red)
2	(Norway)	DF	Marius Lode	2	0	1	0	3	0
3	(Norway)	DF	Emil Jonassen	1	0	0	0	1	0
4	(Norway)	DF	Martin Bjørnbak	5	1	0	0	5	1
5	(Norway)	DF	Thomas Jacobsen	2	0	1	0	3	0
6	(Norway)	MF	Vegard Moberg	3	0	0	0	3	0
8	(Norway)	DF	Daniel Edvardsen	1	0	0	0	1	0
10	(Spain)	MF	José Ángel	7	1	1	0	8	1
14	(Norway)	MF	Ulrik Saltnes	3	0	0	0	3	0
20	(Sweden)	FW	Amor Layouni	2	0	0	0	2	0
21	(Norway)	DF	Erlend Dahl Reitan	1	0	0	0	1	0
22	(Norway)	FW	Kristian Opseth	1	0	0	0	1	0
24	(Norway)	DF	Fredrik André Bjørkan	3	0	0	0	3	0
25	(Brazil)	GK	Ricardo	1	0	0	0	1	0
27	(Norway)	MF	Patrick Berg	2	0	0	0	2	0
30	(Norway)	FW	Trond Olsen	0	0	1	0	1	0
31	(Norway)	FW	Jens Petter Hauge	1	0	0	0	1	0
33	(Norway)	MF	Håkon Evjen	1	0	0	0	1	0
Players away on loan:
Players who appeared for Bodø/Glimt no longer at the club:
9	(Nigeria)	FW	Kachi	1	0	1	0	2	0
17	(Norway)	MF	Mathias Normann	3	0	1	0	4	0
			TOTALS	40	2	6	0	46	2
