= Ulrik Saltnes =

Norwegian footballer (born 1992)

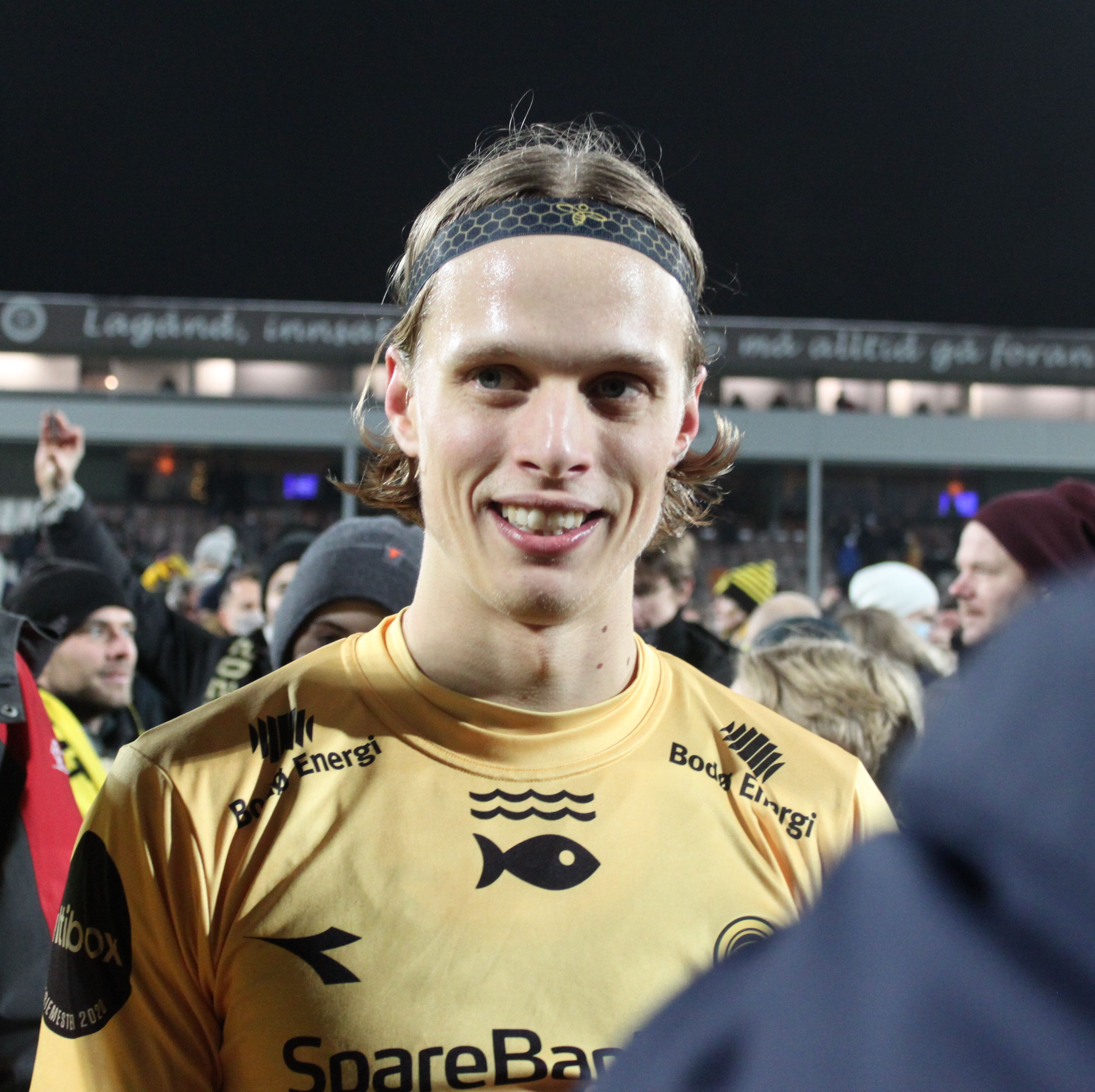
- Saltnes with Bodø/Glimt in 2021

Personal information
- Date of birth: 10 November 1992 (age 34)
- Place of birth: Brønnøysund, Norway
- Height: 1.87 m (6 ft 2 in)
- Position: Midfielder

Team information
- Current team: Bodø/Glimt
- Number: 14

Youth career
- Brønnøysund

Senior career*
Years	Team	Apps	(Gls)
2009–2010	Brønnøysund	1	(0)
2011–	Bodø/Glimt	316	(73)
- * Club domestic league appearances and goals as of 20 November 2026

Ulrik Saltnes (born 10 November 1992) is a Norwegian professional footballer who plays as a midfielder for Bodø/Glimt.

== Career ==
Saltnes was born in Brønnøysund. He made his senior debut for Bodø/Glimt on 15 April 2012 against Alta; Bodø/Glimt won 1–0.

On 22 July 2021, he netted his first ever goal in a European competition in a 3–0 win over Valur in the first leg of their UEFA Europa League second qualifying round tie.

On 10 April 2025, Saltnes scored twice as Bodø/Glimt secured an historic 2–0 win over Lazio in the quarter-finals of the UEFA Europa League. On 17 April, Bodø/Glimt defeated Lazio in a penalty shootout in the second leg, becoming the first Norwegian club to reach the semi-finals of a European competition.

On 1 May 2025, Saltnes continued his scoring run in the Europa League with a goal against Tottenham Hotspur in a 1–3 first-leg semi-final loss.

== Career statistics ==
As of match played 20 November 2026

Appearances and goals by club, season and competition
Club	Season	League			Norwegian Cup		Europe		Total	
Club	Season	Division	Apps	Goals	Apps	Goals	Apps	Goals	Apps	Goals
Brønnøysund IL	2010	3. divisjon	1	0	0	0	–		1	0
Bodø/Glimt	2011	1. divisjon	0	0	1	1	–		1	1
Bodø/Glimt	2012	1. divisjon	20	1	4	1	–		24	2
Bodø/Glimt	2013	1. divisjon	11	1	4	0	–		15	1
Bodø/Glimt	2014	Eliteserien	7	0	3	0	–		10	0
Bodø/Glimt	2015	Eliteserien	17	1	3	1	–		20	2
Bodø/Glimt	2016	Eliteserien	12	0	4	0	–		16	0
Bodø/Glimt	2017	1. divisjon	27	13	3	2	–		30	15
Bodø/Glimt	2018	Eliteserien	28	4	4	2	–		32	6
Bodø/Glimt	2019	Eliteserien	30	7	1	0	–		31	7
Bodø/Glimt	2020	Eliteserien	30	12	0	0	3 (Note: Appearances in UEFA Europa League)	0	33	12
Bodø/Glimt	2021	Eliteserien	23	8	0	0	17 (Note: Two appearances in UEFA Champions League, fifteen appearances and six goals in UEFA Europa Conference League)	6	40	14
Bodø/Glimt	2022	Eliteserien	27	6	5	2	14 (Note: Eight appearances and one goal in UEFA Champions League, six appearances in UEFA Europa League)	1	46	9
Bodø/Glimt	2023	Eliteserien	18	6	4	2	14 (Note: Appearances in UEFA Europa Conference League)	1	36	9
Bodø/Glimt	2024	Eliteserien	27	7	3	2	21 (Note: Six appearances and two goals in UEFA Champions League, fifteen appearances and three goals in UEFA Europa League)	5	51	14
Bodø/Glimt	2025	Eliteserien	23	7	2	2	3 (Note: Appearances in UEFA Champions League)	1	28	10
Bodø/Glimt	2026	Eliteserien	16	0	3	0	8	0	27	0
Bodø/Glimt	Total		316	73	44	15	80	14	440	102
Career total			317	73	44	15	80	14	441	102

== Honours ==
Bodø/Glimt

- Eliteserien: 2020, 2021, 2023, 2024
- Norwegian First Division: 2017
- Norwegian Football Cup: 2025–26
