= Jens Petter Hauge =

Norwegian football player (born 1999)

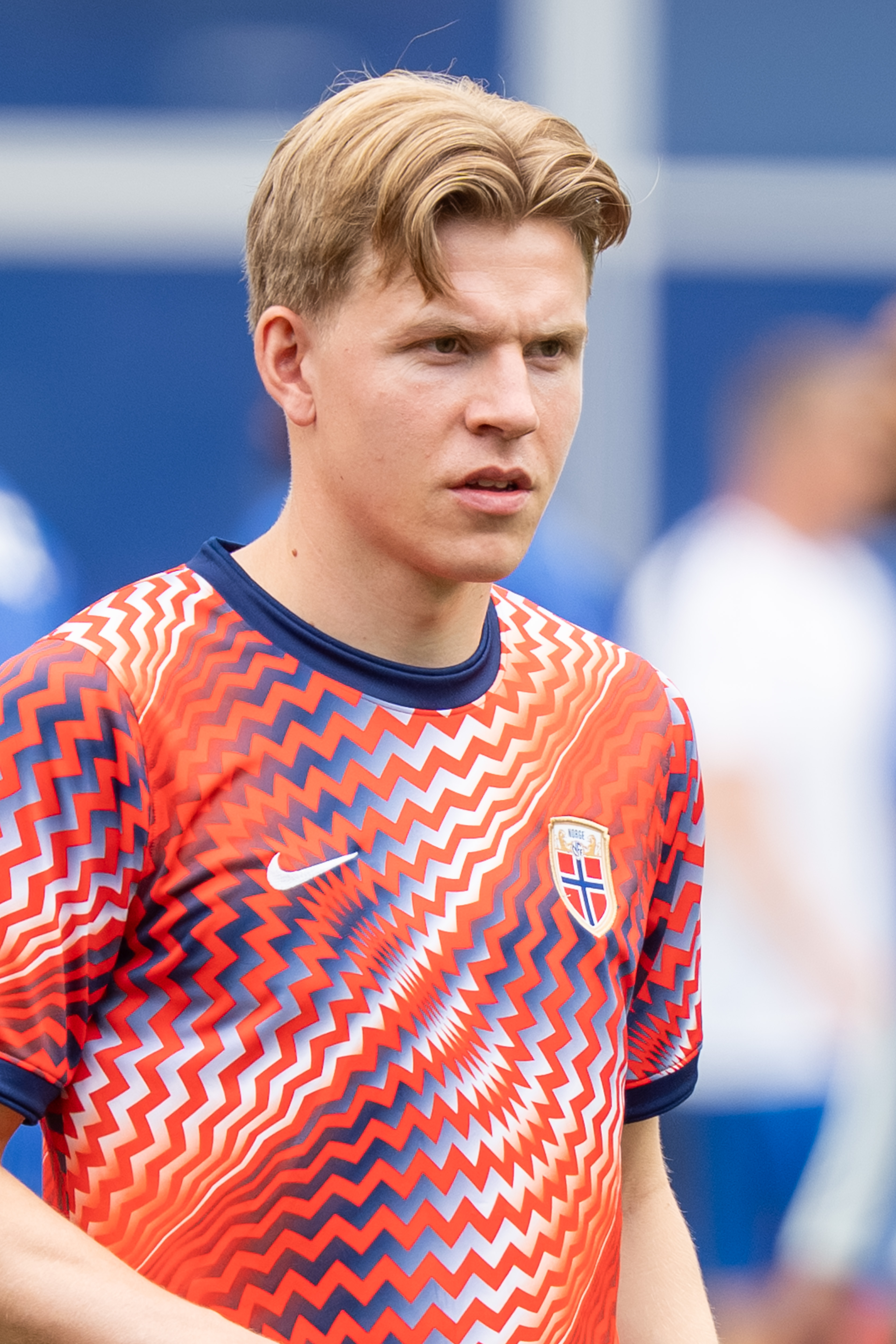
- Hauge with Norway in 2026

Personal information
- Full name: Jens Petter Hauge
- Date of birth: 12 October 1999 (age 27)
- Place of birth: Bodø, Norway
- Height: 1.85 m (6 ft 1 in)
- Position: Left winger

Team information
- Current team: Bodø/Glimt
- Number: 10

Youth career
- 2012–2015: Bodø/Glimt

Senior career*
Years	Team	Apps	(Gls)
2016–2020	Bodø/Glimt	106	(27)
2018	→ Aalesund (loan)	6	(0)
2020–2022	AC Milan	18	(2)
2021–2022	→ Eintracht Frankfurt (loan)	26	(2)
2022–2025	Eintracht Frankfurt	10	(0)
2022–2023	→ Gent (loan)	19	(0)
2024	→ Bodø/Glimt (loan)	28	(8)
2025–	Bodø/Glimt	52	(14)

International career^{‡}
2014	Norway U15	4	(0)
2015	Norway U16	4	(0)
2016	Norway U17	8	(0)
2016–2017	Norway U18	14	(1)
2017–2018	Norway U19	9	(3)
2019	Norway U20	4	(1)
2019–2021	Norway U21	4	(1)
2020–	Norway	16	(1)
- * Club domestic league appearances and goals as of 20 November 2026 ‡ National team caps and goals as of 26 June 2026

Jens Petter Hauge (born 12 October 1999) is a Norwegian professional footballer who plays as a left winger for Eliteserien club Bodø/Glimt and the Norway national team.

== Club career ==
=== Bodø/Glimt ===
Born in Bodø, Nordland, spending his childhood years in FK Vinkelen, and progressing through the youth academy of Bodø/Glimt, Hauge signed his first professional contract with the club on 12 April 2016. The following day he made his senior debut in a 6–0 cup win against IF Fløya as a 64th-minute substitute for Fitim Azemi. He immediately scored a hat-trick. Hauge made his league debut on 23 April against Strømsgodset, where he came on as a late substitute as Bodø/Glimt lost 2–0. In the next league games he featured regularly, and on 8 July, he scored his first top-flight goal in the 4–1 away win over IK Start, becoming Bodø/Glimt's youngest ever goalscorer in the Eliteserien. In the 2016 season, he made 20 league appearances in which he scored one goal, as Bodø/Glimt suffered relegation to the second-tier Norwegian First Division.

In the following season, Hauge established himself as an undisputed starter as Bodø/Glimt won the second-tier championship and made their immediate return to the top-flight Eliteserien. He made a significant contribution that season, scoring two goals and making 13 assists. At the start of the 2018 season, Hauge again lost his starting role, and as a result, was loaned to the second-tier club Aalesunds FK on 15 August 2018, halfway through the season, after 11 league appearances in which he scored no goals. In Aalesund, he had made only six league appearances by the end of the season.

During the course of the following season, Hauge made it back into the starting line-up of Bodø/Glimt. On 10 November 2019, he scored both goals for his club in a 2–3 away defeat to Rosenborg. That season, he made 28 league appearances in which he scored seven goals and registered two assists.

Scheduled to begin in March, the 2020 season was postponed until June 2020 due to the COVID-19 pandemic. Hauge and Bodø/Glimt got off to an excellent start. After ten match-days, the club surprisingly took a lead in the league table. At that point, Hauge had already scored six goals and assisted six. He also managed to impress in the UEFA Europa League qualifiers. In the narrow 2–3 away defeat to Italian club A.C. Milan, Hauge was directly involved in both his team's goals. As a result, media reported that the Rossoneri were interested in signing him.

=== AC Milan ===
On 1 October 2020, Hauge signed a five-year contract with Serie A club A.C. Milan. Three days later, he made his debut in a 3–0 win over Spezia. On 22 October, he scored his first goal for Milan in a 3–1 win at Celtic in the group stage of the Europa League. On 22 November, he scored his first Serie A goal in a 3–1 away win over Napoli.

=== Eintracht Frankfurt ===
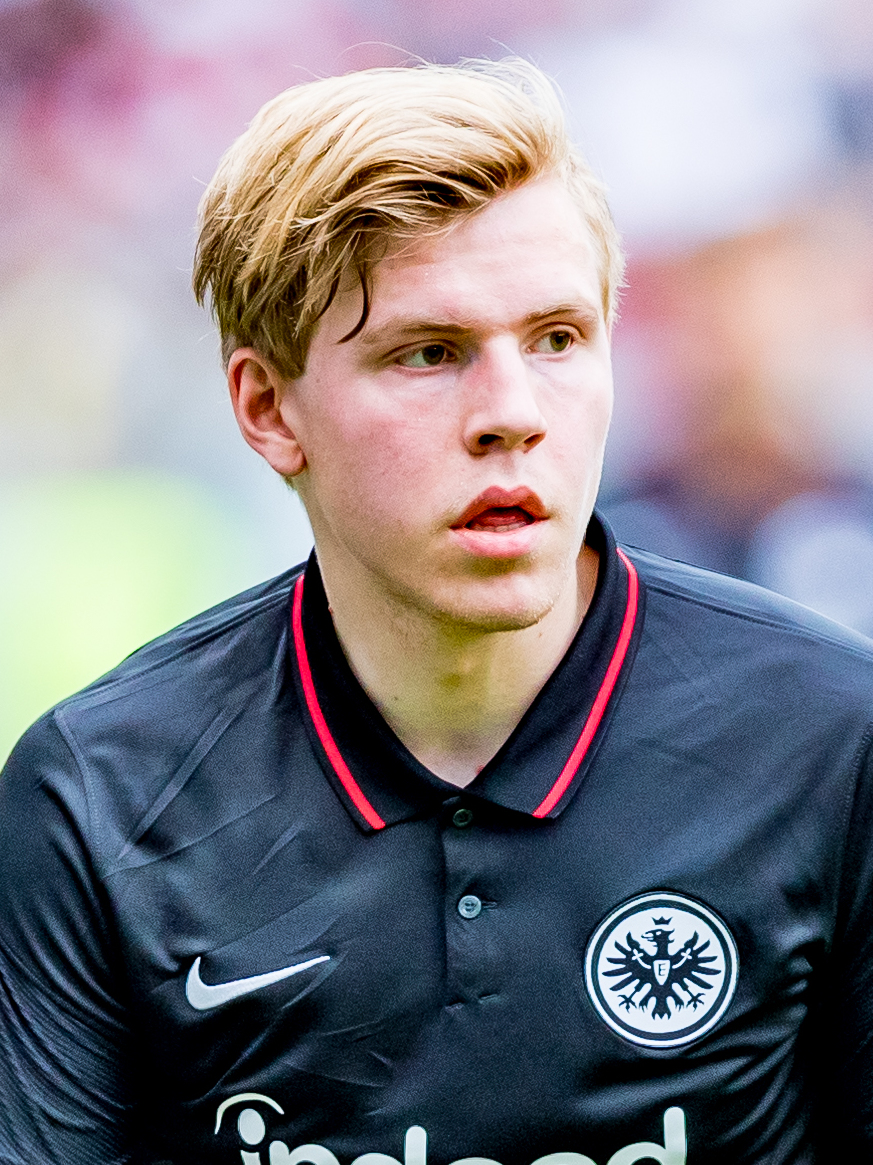
Hauge with Eintracht Frankfurt in 2022

On 10 August 2021, Eintracht Frankfurt announced that Hauge would join the Bundesliga club on a season-long loan with an option to make the deal permanent. He scored a goal in his Frankfurt debut, although in a 5–2 loss against Borussia Dortmund, on 14 August.

On 28 May 2022, Eintracht Frankfurt announced that they had activated the purchase option for Hauge from Serie A club AC Milan following his one-year loan. Hauge signed his contract until 2026.

==== Loan to Gent ====
On 16 August 2022, Gent announced that Hauge would join the Belgian First Division A club on a season-long loan.

=== Return to Bodø/Glimt ===
On 31 January 2024, Hauge returned to Bodø/Glimt on loan until the end of 2024, with an option to buy. On 16 January 2025, he joined the club on a permanent deal by signing a contract until 2028.

He scored his first UEFA Champions League goals by netting a brace in a 2–2 draw with Tottenham Hotspur on 30 September 2025. During the 2025–26 Champions League knockout play-offs, he scored in both legs and provided an assist in 5–2 victory on aggregate over Inter Milan.

== International career ==
Hauge made his debut for the Norway national under-21 team against Cyprus on 15 November 2019. He started the match, and Norway won 2–1. On 4 September 2020, he scored his first goal for the under-21 team against Gibraltar, contributing to a 6–0 victory.

Hauge made his senior international debut for the Norway national team on 11 October 2020 in a UEFA Nations League match against Romania. He came on as a substitute for Mohamed Elyounoussi, and Norway won the match 4–0.

On 21 May 2026, Hauge was included in the 26-man squad selected by Norway national team manager Ståle Solbakken for the 2026 FIFA World Cup.

== Personal life ==
Hauge has a younger brother, Runar, who is also a professional footballer who plays for Hobro IK. The pair has played together for Bodø/Glimt, the club where they both made their debuts.

== Career statistics ==
=== Club ===
As of match played 20 November 2026

Appearances and goals by club, season and competition
Club	Season	League			National cup (Note: Includes Norwegian Cup, Coppa Italia, Belgian Cup, DFB-Pokal)		Europe		Total	
Club	Season	Division	Apps	Goals	Apps	Goals	Apps	Goals	Apps	Goals
Bodø/Glimt	2016	Tippeligaen	20	1	4	4	–		24	5
Bodø/Glimt	2017	Norwegian First Division	28	2	0	0	–		28	2
Bodø/Glimt	2018	Eliteserien	11	0	4	2	–		15	2
Bodø/Glimt	2019	Eliteserien	29	7	1	2	–		30	9
Bodø/Glimt	2020	Eliteserien	18	14	0	0	3 (Note: Appearances in UEFA Europa League)	3	21	17
Bodø/Glimt	Total		106	24	9	8	3	3	118	35
Aalesund (loan)	2018	Norwegian First Division	6	0	0	0	–		6	0
Milan	2020–21	Serie A	18	2	1	0	5	3	24	5
Eintracht Frankfurt (loan)	2021–22	Bundesliga	26	2	0	0	11	1	37	3
Gent (loan)	2022–23	Belgian Pro League	19	0	2	0	8 (Note: Appearances in UEFA Europa Conference League)	0	29	0
Eintracht Frankfurt	2023–24	Bundesliga	10	0	2	0	5	0	17	0
Bodø/Glimt (loan)	2023	Eliteserien	–		–		2	0	2	0
Bodø/Glimt (loan)	2024	Eliteserien	28	8	2	1	22 (Note: Six appearances and one goal in UEFA Champions League, sixteen appearances and two goals in UEFA Europa League)	3	52	12
Bodø/Glimt	2025	Eliteserien	28	8	3	1	8 (Note: Appearances in UEFA Champions League)	3	39	12
Bodø/Glimt	2026	Eliteserien	24	6	5	0	14	5	43	11
Bodø/Glimt	Bodø/Glimt total		80	22	10	2	46	11	136	35
Career total			265	50	24	10	78	18	367	78

=== International ===
As of match played 26 June 2026

Appearances and goals by national team and year
National team	Year	Apps	Goals
Norway	2020	1	0
Norway	2021	7	0
Norway	2022	2	0
Norway	2023	0	0
Norway	2024	1	1
Norway	2025	2	0
Norway	2026	3	0
Total		16	1

Scores and results list Norway's goal tally first, score column indicates score after each Hauge goal.

List of international goals scored by Jens Petter Hauge
No.	Date	Venue	Opponent	Score	Result	Competition
1	14 November 2024	Stožice Stadium, Ljubljana, Slovenia	Slovenia	1–4	1–4	2024–25 UEFA Nations League B

== Honours ==
Bodø/Glimt

- Eliteserien: 2020, 2024
- Norwegian Football Cup: 2025–26

Eintracht Frankfurt

- UEFA Europa League: 2021–22

Individual

- Eliteserien Young Player of the Year: 2020
