= Sascha Mockenhaupt =

German footballer

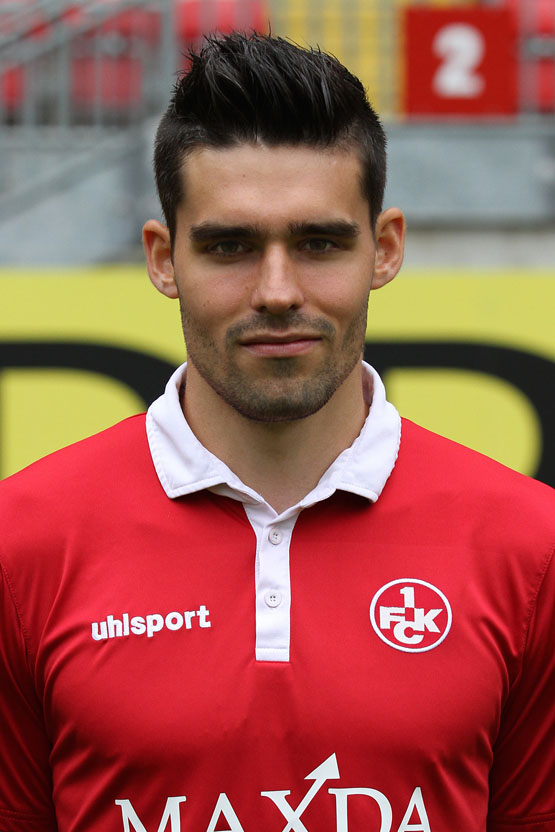
- Mockenhaupt with 1. FC Kaiserslautern

Personal information
- Date of birth: 10 September 1991 (age 35)
- Place of birth: Kirchen, Germany
- Height: 1.85 m (6 ft 1 in)
- Position: Defender

Team information
- Current team: SG Hüffelsheim

Youth career
- 2010–2012: SG Betzdorf

Senior career*
Years	Team	Apps	(Gls)
2012–2014	1. FC Kaiserslautern II	41	(3)
2013–2014	1. FC Kaiserslautern	1	(0)
2014–2015	VfR Aalen	25	(0)
2015–2016	1. FC Kaiserslautern	18	(1)
2015–2016	1. FC Kaiserslautern II	2	(0)
2016	FK Bodø/Glimt	10	(1)
2017–2026	SV Wehen Wiesbaden	319	(5)
2026–	SG Hüffelsheim	0	(0)
Personal information
Name	Sascha Mockenhaupt
Born	Germany
Nationality	German
Current team
Team	SV Wehen Wiesbaden
Role	Player
Game	FIFA
Esports career information
Playing career	2020–present
Handle	M_ocki
Team history
2020–	SV Wehen Wiesbaden
- * Club domestic league appearances and goals as of 29 May 2026

Sascha Mockenhaupt (born 10 September 1991) is a German professional footballer who plays as a defender for SG Hüffelsheim in the sixth-tier Verbandsliga Südwest. He is also a professional FIFA esports player.

== Career statistics ==
As of 13 September 2020

Appearances and goals by club, season and competition
Club	Season	League			Cup		Other		Total	
Club	Season	Division	Apps	Goals	Apps	Goals	Apps	Goals	Apps	Goals
1. FC Kaiserslautern II	2012–13	Regionalliga Südwest	23	1	—		—		23	1
1. FC Kaiserslautern II	2013–14	Regionalliga Südwest	18	2	—		—		18	2
1. FC Kaiserslautern II	Total		41	3	—		—		41	3
1. FC Kaiserslautern	2013–14	2. Bundesliga	1	0	0	0	—		1	0
VfR Aalen	2014–15	2. Bundesliga	25	0	2	0	—		27	0
1. FC Kaiserslautern	2015–16	2. Bundesliga	18	1	1	0	—		19	1
1. FC Kaiserslautern II	2015–16	Regionalliga Südwest	2	0	—		—		2	0
Bodø/Glimt	2016	Tippeligaen	10	1	2	0	—		12	1
1. FC Kaiserslautern	2016–17	2. Bundesliga	0	0	0	0	—		0	0
Wehen Wiesbaden	2016–17	3. Liga	17	0	0	0	—		17	0
Wehen Wiesbaden	2017–18	3. Liga	36	3	2	0	—		38	3
Wehen Wiesbaden	2018–19	3. Liga	36	1	2	0	2	0	40	1
Wehen Wiesbaden	2019–20	2. Bundesliga	32	0	1	0	—		33	0
Wehen Wiesbaden	2020–21	3. Liga	0	0	1	0	—		1	0
Wehen Wiesbaden	Total		121	4	6	0	2	0	129	4
Career total			218	9	11	0	2	0	231	9
