= Serhiy Pohorilyy =

Ukrainian footballer

Serhiy Pohorilyi
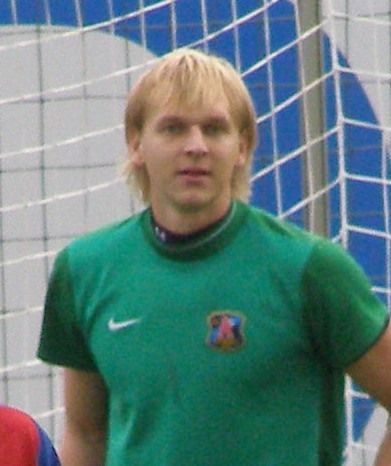

Personal information
- Full name: Serhiy Petrovych Pohorilyi
- Date of birth: 28 July 1986 (age 40)
- Place of birth: Kyiv, Ukrainian SSR, Soviet Union
- Height: 1.91 m (6 ft 3 in)
- Position: Goalkeeper

Team information
- Current team: Samtredia
- Number: 21

Youth career
- 1999–2000: Dynamo Kyiv
- 2003: FC Zmina-Obolon Kyiv

Senior career*
Years	Team	Apps	(Gls)
2003	Podillya Khmelnytskyi	0	(0)
2004–2007	Obolon Kyiv	0	(0)
2004–2007	→ Obolon-2 Kyiv	27	(0)
2007	CSKA Kyiv	8	(0)
2007–2012	Arsenal Kyiv	38	(0)
2012–2014	Tavriya Simferopol	19	(0)
2015–2016	Metalist Kharkiv	24	(0)
2016	Bodø/Glimt	7	(0)
2018	Helios Kharkiv	7	(0)
2018	Samtredia	6	(0)
- * Club domestic league appearances and goals

Serhiy Pohorilyi (born 28 July 1986) is a Ukrainian former professional football goalkeeper.

== Career ==
Initially selected for the game against the Bulgaria national football team on 14 November 2012, he was withdrawn from the national team squad on the decision of the National Team Committee of the Football Federation of Ukraine on 2 November 2012 due to a bad conduct.

In the summer of 2016, he signed a contract with the Norwegian club Bodø/Glimt.

== Career statistics ==
As of 14 November 2016

Season	Club	Division	League		Cup		Total	
Season	Club	Division	Apps	Goals	Apps	Goals	Apps	Goals
2009–10	Arsenal Kyiv	UPL	2	0	0	0	2	0
2010–11	Arsenal Kyiv	UPL	18	0	1	0	19	0
2011–12	Arsenal Kyiv	UPL	18	0	0	0	18	0
2012–13	Tavriya Simferopol	UPL	14	0	2	0	16	0
2013–14	Tavriya Simferopol	UPL	5	0	1	0	6	0
2014–15	Metalist Kharkiv	UPL	10	0	1	0	11	0
2015–16	Metalist Kharkiv	UPL	14	0	0	0	14	0
2016	Bodø/Glimt	Tippeligaen	7	0	0	0	7	0
Career Total			88	0	5	0	93	0
