= Vadim Manzon =

Russian-Israeli footballer

Vadim Manzon Вадим Манзон
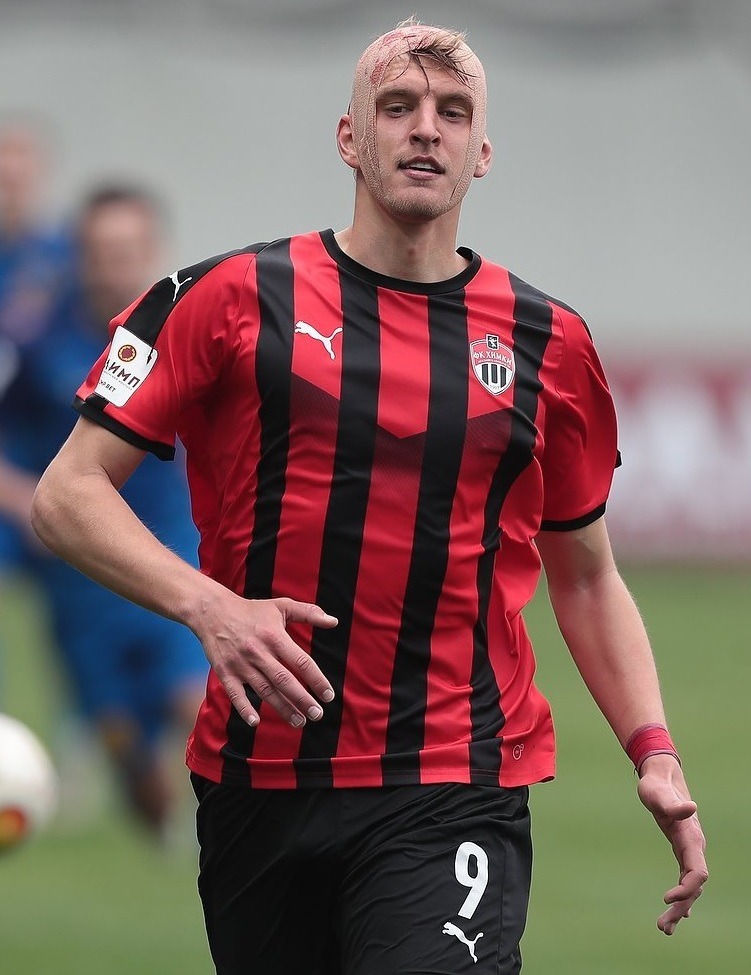
- Manzon with FC Khimki in 2019

Personal information
- Full name: Vadim Arkadyevich Manzon
- Date of birth: 5 December 1994 (age 31)
- Place of birth: Moscow, Russia
- Height: 1.95 m (6 ft 5 in)
- Position: Forward

Youth career
- PFC CSKA Moscow

Senior career*
Years	Team	Apps	(Gls)
2013–2015	FC Strogino Moscow	45	(7)
2015–2017	Karlsruher SC	10	(1)
2016	→ Bodø/Glimt (loan)	10	(1)
2017	→ Åsane (loan)	12	(1)
2017–2018	FC Olimpiyets Nizhny Novgorod	12	(0)
2018	Hapoel Be'er Sheva	2	(0)
2018	Trakai	12	(3)
2019	Khimki	5	(0)
2019	→ Khimki-M	2	(0)

International career
2011–2012	Russia U-18	8	(3)
2013	Russia U-19	5	(1)
2013–2016	Russia U-21	10	(1)
- * Club domestic league appearances and goals

Vadim Arkadyevich Manzon (Russian: Вадим Аркадьевич Манзон; born 5 December 1994) is a Russian-Israeli former football forward.

== Club career ==
He made his debut in the Russian Second Division for FC Strogino Moscow on 15 July 2013 in a game against FC Torpedo Vladimir.

He made his Russian Football National League debut for FC Olimpiyets Nizhny Novgorod on 15 July 2017 in a game against PFC Krylia Sovetov Samara.

Mazon signed a three-year contract with Karlsruher SC on 25 July 2015.

== Career statistics ==
As of 12 June 2017

Season	Club	Division	League		Cup		Total	
Season	Club	Division	Apps	Goals	Apps	Goals	Apps	Goals
2015–16	Karlsruher SC	2. Bundesliga	10	1	0	0	10	1
2016	Bodø/Glimt	Eliteserien	10	1	2	2	12	3
2017	Åsane	1. divisjon	10	1	2	1	12	2
Career Total			30	3	4	3	34	6
