= Derrick Mensah =

Ghanaian footballer

Personal information
- Full name: Derrick Ediyaa Mensah
- Date of birth: 28 May 1995 (age 31)
- Place of birth: Ghana
- Height: 1.75 m (5 ft 9 in)
- Position: Midfielder

Team information
- Current team: Dolný Kubín
- Number: 11

Senior career*
Years	Team	Apps	(Gls)
2012–2013	Tema Youth		
2013–2014	Club Africain		
2014–2016	Baník Ostrava	24	(0)
2016–2017	Haugesund	4	(0)
2016	→ Karviná (loan)	1	(0)
2017–2018	Aluminij	22	(1)
2018	Dunav Ruse	3	(0)
2019	Znojmo	1	(0)
2019	AC Kajaani	10	(0)
2023–2024	Dinamo Samarqand	14	(1)
2024–	Dolný Kubín	6	(0)

International career
2013	Ghana U20	2	(0)
- * Club domestic league appearances and goals as of 22 June 2024

Derrick Mensah (born 28 May 1995) is a Ghanaian professional football player who plays as a defensive midfielder for Slovak side Dolný Kubín.

Mensah started his professional career with Tema Youth before moving to Club Africain in 2013. Following a contract squabble which led to him leaving the club as a free agent, he joined FC Baník Ostrava in 2014.

Derrick Mensah has played international football at under-20 level for Ghana.

== Playing career ==
=== Club career ===
==== Tema Youth ====
Mensah started his career with Tema Youth. He scored his first senior professional goal against Ebusua Dwarfs on 24 October 2012. The club were relegated that season.

==== Club Africain ====
Following Tema Youth's relegation from the top tier of Ghanaian football, the club decided that they would sell all their players to make way for new players. Mensah moved to Tunisian side Club Africain. He left the Tunisian side without playing a single professional game for them following allegations of salary problems which saw him terminating his contract.

==== Baník Ostrava ====
After failing to obtain a contract with Atlético Madrid, he trialed with Czech side Ostrava but almost failed due to language problems. Despite the problems he has impressed enough for the club to offer him a contract. However, his former club Africain took the matter to FIFA and delayed the transfer. Another factor was the late issuance of the International Transfer Certificate. However, he eventually signed for the club. He made his debut against FK Jablonec as a substitute in the 74th minute in which his team suffered a 1–0 defeat.

==== Haugesund ====
Mensah signed for Haugesund in January 2016 on a three-year deal.

==== Aluminij ====
Mensah signed for Slovenian club Aluminij on 27 January 2017.

== International career ==
Mensah was selected for the U-20 African Youth Championship in Algeria, for the tournament's 2013 edition. He played two games at the tournament.

== Personal ==
Mensah views Milan Baroš as a role model.
