= Daniel Edvardsen =

Norwegian footballer (born 1991)

Personal information
- Full name: Daniel Bertelsen Edvardsen
- Date of birth: 31 August 1991 (age 35)
- Place of birth: Harstad, Norway
- Height: 1.82 m (6 ft 0 in)
- Position: Defender

Youth career
- Harstad
- 2013–2014: Bodø/Glimt

Senior career*
Years	Team	Apps	(Gls)
2012–2013	Harstad	30	(1)
2015–2017	Bodø/Glimt	46	(1)
2018–2019	Sandnes Ulf	32	(0)
- * Club domestic league appearances and goals

Daniel Edvardsen (born 31 August 1991) is a Norwegian footballer who played as a defender.

== Club career ==
Edvardsen was born in Harstad. He made his senior debut for Bodø/Glimt on 11 April 2015 against Molde; Bodø/Glimt lost 1–3. Edvardsen played for Harstad before he joined Bodø/Glimt.

== Career statistics ==
As of 4 November 2019

Season	Club	Division	League		Cup		Total	
Season	Club	Division	Apps	Goals	Apps	Goals	Apps	Goals
2012	Harstad	3. divisjon	16	1	2	0	18	1
2013	Harstad	2. divisjon	14	0	2	0	16	0
2014	Bodø/Glimt	Tippeligaen	0	0	0	0	0	0
2015	Bodø/Glimt	Tippeligaen	17	0	1	0	18	0
2016	Bodø/Glimt	Tippeligaen	21	0	3	0	24	0
2017	Bodø/Glimt	1. divisjon	8	1	3	1	11	2
2018	Sandnes Ulf	1. divisjon	14	0	0	0	14	0
2019	Sandnes Ulf	1. divisjon	17	0	2	0	19	0
Career Total			107	2	13	1	120	3
