= Anders Karlsen =

Norwegian footballer (born 1990)

Personal information
- Full name: Anders Karlsen
- Date of birth: 15 February 1990 (age 36)
- Place of birth: Bodø, Norway
- Position: Midfielder

Team information
- Current team: Innstranden

Senior career*
Years	Team	Apps	(Gls)
2006–2011	Bodø/Glimt	39	(4)
2009	→ Stavanger (loan)	29	(2)
2012–2013	Mjøndalen	42	(5)
2013–2016	Bodø/Glimt	59	(2)
2016–2022	Tromsdalen	105	(4)
2022–	Innstranden	0	(0)
- * Club domestic league appearances and goals as of 20 March 2022

Anders Karlsen (born 15 February 1990) is a Norwegian football midfielder how plays for Innstranden.

== Career ==
Karlsen join the first team in 2006 after impressing in the second team. In 2009, he went on loan to Stavanger.

Before the 2012-season he signed a contract with Mjøndalen, but he went back to Bodø/Glimt in 2013.

== Career statistics ==
As of 20 June 2021

Season	Club	Division	League		Cup		Total	
Season	Club	Division	Apps	Goals	Apps	Goals	Apps	Goals
2006	Bodø/Glimt	Adeccoligaen	1	0	0	0	1	0
2007	Bodø/Glimt	Adeccoligaen	14	0	0	0	14	0
2008	Bodø/Glimt	Tippeligaen	0	0	1	0	1	0
2009	Stavanger	Adeccoligaen	29	2	1	0	30	2
2010	Bodø/Glimt	Adeccoligaen	11	2	2	0	13	2
2011	Bodø/Glimt	Adeccoligaen	13	2	2	1	15	3
2012	Mjøndalen	Adeccoligaen	26	4	3	2	29	6
2013	Mjøndalen	Adeccoligaen	16	1	4	1	20	2
2013	Bodø/Glimt	Adeccoligaen	11	0	0	0	11	0
2014	Bodø/Glimt	Tippeligaen	20	2	4	0	24	2
2015	Bodø/Glimt	Tippeligaen	19	0	1	0	20	0
2016	Bodø/Glimt	Tippeligaen	9	0	2	0	11	0
2016	Tromsdalen	PostNord-ligaen	7	0	0	0	7	0
2017	Tromsdalen	OBOS-ligaen	29	0	2	0	31	0
2018	Tromsdalen	OBOS-ligaen	28	2	0	0	28	2
2019	Tromsdalen	OBOS-ligaen	13	1	1	0	14	1
2020	Tromsdalen	PostNord-ligaen	15	1	0	0	15	1
2021	Tromsdalen	PostNord-ligaen	13	0	0	0	13	0
Career Total			274	17	23	4	297	21
