= 2026 FK Bodø/Glimt season =

Bodø/Glimt
2026 season
- President: Inge Henning Andersen
- Head Coach: Kjetil Knutsen
- Stadium: Aspmyra Stadion
- Eliteserien: Round 11
- 2025–26 Norwegian Football Cup: Winners
- 2025–26 UEFA Champions League: Round of 16
- 2026–27 Norwegian Football Cup: First round
- 2026–27 UEFA Champions League: League phase
| Home colours | Away colours | Third colours |

The 2026 season is the 110th season in the history of FK Bodø/Glimt and their 9th consecutive season in the top flight of Norwegian football. In addition to the Eliteserien, Bodø/Glimt participated in the Norwegian Cup, where they became champions, and the 2025–26 UEFA Champions League.

Kjetil Knutsen has signed a new contract with the club, lasting until 2029. In January, Brede Moe, who has been playing for Glimt since 2014, retired from professional football.

== Current squad ==
As of 12 January 2026

Note: Flags indicate national team as defined under FIFA eligibility rules; some limited exceptions apply. Players may hold more than one non-FIFA nationality.

| No. | Pos. | Nation | Player |
|---|---|---|---|
| 1 | GK | NOR | Julian Faye Lund |
| 2 | DF | DEN | Villads Nielsen |
| 4 | DF | NOR | Odin Bjørtuft |
| 5 | DF | NOR | Haitam Aleesami |
| 6 | DF | NOR | Jostein Gundersen |
| 7 | MF | NOR | Patrick Berg (captain) |
| 8 | MF | NOR | Sondre Auklend |
| 9 | FW | DEN | Kasper Høgh |
| 10 | FW | NOR | Jens Petter Hauge |
| 11 | FW | NOR | Ole Didrik Blomberg |
| 12 | GK | RUS | Nikita Haikin |
| 14 | MF | NOR | Ulrik Saltnes |
| 15 | DF | NOR | Fredrik André Bjørkan |
| 17 | FW | NOR | Ola Brynhildsen (on loan from Midtjylland) |

| No. | Pos. | Nation | Player |
|---|---|---|---|
| 19 | MF | NOR | Sondre Brunstad Fet |
| 20 | MF | NOR | Fredrik Sjøvold |
| 21 | FW | NOR | Andreas Helmersen |
| 22 | MF | DEN | Anders Klynge |
| 23 | MF | NOR | Magnus Bech Riisnæs |
| 24 | FW | NOR | Daniel Bassi |
| 25 | DF | NOR | Isak Dybvik Määttä |
| 26 | MF | NOR | Håkon Evjen |
| 31 | FW | NOR | Hindrin Najah Chooly |
| 42 | FW | NGR | Gift Sunday |
| 44 | GK | NOR | Magnus Brøndbo |
| 45 | GK | NOR | Isak Sjong |
| 77 | FW | DEN | Mikkel Bro Hansen |
| 94 | FW | NOR | August Mikkelsen |

=== Out on loan ===
Note: Flags indicate national team as defined under FIFA eligibility rules; some limited exceptions apply. Players may hold more than one non-FIFA nationality.

| No. | Pos. | Nation | Player |
|---|---|---|---|
| 16 | MF | NOR | Syver Skeide (at Kristiansund until 31 December 2025) |
| 17 | FW | SWE | Samuel Burakovsky (at Kolding until 30 June 2026) |

== Pre-season and friendlies ==
Win Draw Loss Fixtures

| 6 January 2026 Friendly | Bodø/Glimt (Norway) | 4–0 | (Netherlands) FC Groningen | Marbella, Spain |
| 17:00 CET (UTC+1) | Evjen 20'; Blomberg 24'; Määttä 49'; Mikkelsen 90+1' | Report | | Stadium: Marbella Football Center |

| 13 January 2026 Friendly | Bodø/Glimt (Norway) | 4–1 | (Hungary) Diosgyori VTK | Marbella, Spain |
| 13:00 CET (UTC+1) | Bjørkan 21'; Jørgensen 33'; Høgh 35'; Høgh 45' | Report | Acolatse 3' | Stadium: Banús Football Center |

| 28 June 2026 Friendly | Molde FK | 1–4 | Bodø/Glimt | Molde |
| 15:45 CEST (UTC+2) | | Report | | Stadium: Aker Stadion |

| 4 July 2026 Friendly | Bodø/Glimt | 4–0 | IK Start | Bodø |
| 16:00 CEST (UTC+2) | | Report | | Stadium: Aspmyra Stadion |

== Competitions ==
=== Overview ===
| Competition | First match | Last match | Starting round | Final position | Record | | | | | | | |
| Competition | First match | Last match | Starting round | Final position | Pld | W | D | L | GF | GA | GD | Win % |
|---|---|---|---|---|---|---|---|---|---|---|---|---|
| Eliteserien | 6 April 2026 | December 2026 | Matchday 1 | | 17 | 13 | 2 | 2 | 43 | 13 | +30 | 76.47 |
| 2025–26 Norwegian Football Cup | 25 September 2025 | | Third round | Winners | 4 | 3 | 1 | 0 | 11 | 5 | +6 | 75.00 |
| 2025–26 UEFA Champions League | 20 August 2025 | 17 March 2026 | Play-off round | | 6 | 5 | 0 | 1 | 13 | 9 | +4 | 83.33 |
| Total | | | | | 27 | 21 | 3 | 3 | 67 | 27 | +40 | 77.78 |

Last updated: 27 April 2026
Source: Competitions

=== Eliteserien ===
==== League table ====
| Pos | Team | Pld | W | D | L | GF | GA | GD | Pts | Qualification or relegation |
|---|---|---|---|---|---|---|---|---|---|---|
| 1 | Viking (T) | 25 | 19 | 2 | 4 | 64 | 26 | +38 | 59 | Qualification for the Champions League play-off round |
| 2 | Bodø/Glimt (T) | 25 | 19 | 2 | 4 | 61 | 23 | +38 | 59 | Qualification for the Champions League second qualifying round |
| 3 | Molde | 25 | 13 | 4 | 8 | 59 | 39 | +20 | 43 | Qualification for the Conference League second qualifying round |
| 4 | Rosenborg | 25 | 13 | 4 | 8 | 49 | 31 | +18 | 43 | Qualification for the Conference League second qualifying round |
| 5 | Lillestrøm | 25 | 13 | 3 | 9 | 36 | 33 | +3 | 42 | |

Updated to match(es) played on 1 November 2026. Source: Football Association of Norway (in Norwegian)
Rules for classification: 1) Points; 2) Goal difference; 3) Goals scored; 4) Head-to-head points; 5) Head-to-head goal difference; 6) Head-to-head goals scored.
(T) Qualified, but not yet for the particular phase indicated

==== Results summary ====
| Overall | | | | | | | | Home | | | | | | Away | | | | | |
| Pld | W | D | L | GF | GA | GD | Pts | W | D | L | GF | GA | GD | W | D | L | GF | GA | GD |
|---|---|---|---|---|---|---|---|---|---|---|---|---|---|---|---|---|---|---|---|
| 11 | 7 | 2 | 2 | 28 | 11 | +17 | 23 | 4 | 0 | 1 | 16 | 2 | +14 | 3 | 2 | 1 | 12 | 9 | +3 |

Source: NFF

==== Results by round ====
| Round | 1 | 2 | 3 | 4 | 5 | 6 | 7 | 8 | 9 | 10 | 11 | 12 | 13 | 14 | 15 | 16 | 17 | 18 | 19 | 20 | 21 | 22 | 23 | 24 | 25 | 26 | 27 | 28 | 29 | 30 |
|---|---|---|---|---|---|---|---|---|---|---|---|---|---|---|---|---|---|---|---|---|---|---|---|---|---|---|---|---|---|---|
| Ground | A | H | A | A | H | A | H | A | H | H | A | H | A | H | A | H | A | H | H | A | H | A | H | A | H | A | A | H | A | H |
| Result | D | W | W | L | W | W | L | W | W | W | D | P | W | W | W | W | W | W | W | W | | | | | | | | | | |
| Position | 8 | 4 | 2 | 5 | 4 | 3 | 5 | 3 | 3 | 3 | 3 | 3 | 3 | 3 | 2 | 2 | 2 | 1 | 1 | 1 | | | | | | | | | | |

Source: NFF
A = Away; H = Home; W = Win; D = Draw; L = Loss; P = Postponed

==== Matches ====
| 6 April 2026 3 | Kristiansund | 0–3 | Bodø/Glimt | Kristiansund |
| 17:00 UTC+2 | Evjen (yellow card) 87' | Report | Bjørkan 29'; Blomberg 35'; Sjøvold 54'; Bruseth (yellow card) 77'; Meliga (yellow card) 90' | Stadium: Nordmøre stadion Attendance: 3 737; Referee: Marius Waskaas Lien |

| 11 April 2026 4 | Viking | 5–0 | Bodø/Glimt | Stavanger |
| 18:00 UTC+2 | Christiansen 5', (yellow card) 23'; Askildsen 14', (yellow card) 70'; Kvia-Egeskog 16', 74'; Tripic 87' | Report | Blomberg (yellow card) 73' | Stadium: Lyse Arena; Attendance: 15 900; Referee: Espen Eskås |

| 15 April 2026 1 | Sarpsborg 08 | 1–1 | Bodø/Glimt | Sarpsborg |
| 19:00 UTC+2 | Christiansen 33'; Ndiaye (yellow card) 63' | Report | Fet 64' (pen.) (yellow card) 18'; Knutsen (yellow card) 85'; Hauge (yellow card) 90' | Stadium: Sarpsborg Stadion; Attendance: 4 549; Referee: Ola Hobber Nilsen |
Note: This match was moved from March due to the Champions League round of 16 matches vs Sporting

| 18 April 2026 5 | Bodø/Glimt | 3–0 | Aalesund | Bodø |
| 14:00 UTC+2 | Klynge 23'; Sjøvold 71'; Engqvist 89'(o.g.) | Report | Jóhannsson (yellow card) 52' | Stadium: Aspmyra Stadion; Attendance: 7 109; Referee: Mohammad Usman Aslam |

| 26 April 2026 6 | Lillestrøm | 0–2 | Bodø/Glimt | Lillestrøm |
| 19:15 UTC+2 | | Report | Evjen 37'; Høgh 49' | Stadium: Åråsen Stadion; Attendance: 10 368; Referee: Tore Hansen |

| 30 April 2026 18 | Bodø/Glimt | 5–0 | Start | Bodø |
| 19:00 UTC+2 | Määttä 16'; Høgh 22', 66'; Helmersen 79' (pen.), 90' | Report | | Stadium: Aspmyra Stadion; Attendance: 5 441; Referee: Ola Hobber Nilsen |
Note: This match was moved from August due to the Champions League qualifying rounds

| 4 May 2026 7 | Bodø/Glimt | 0–1 | Molde | Bodø |
| 19:00 UTC+2 | | Report | Gulbrandsen 36' | Stadium: Aspmyra Stadion; Attendance: 5 876; Referee: Rohit Saggi |

| 16 May 2026 9 | Bodø/Glimt | 5–0 | Tromsø | Bodø |
| 19:00 UTC+2 | Evjen 21'; Knutsen (yellow card) 45'; Fet 66'; Hauge 68'; Høgh 78', 89' (pen.) | Report | Vik (yellow card) 45'; Warneryd (red card); Cornic (yellow card) 59' | Stadium: Aspmyra Stadion; Attendance: 8 232; Referee: Tore Hansen |

| 20 May 2026 8 | Start | 1–4 | Bodø/Glimt | Kristiansand |
| 18:00 UTC+2 | | Report | | Stadium: Sør Arena |
Note: This match was postponed due to the cup final vs Brann

| 24 May 2026 10 | Bodø/Glimt | 3–1 | Brann | Bodø |
| 16:00 UTC+2 | | Report | | Stadium: Aspmyra Stadion |

| 29 May 2026 11 | Rosenborg | 2–2 | Bodø/Glimt | Trondheim |
| 19:00 UTC+2 | | Report | | Stadium: Lerkendal Stadion |

| 12 July 2026 13 | KFUM Oslo | 0–2 | Bodø/Glimt | Oslo |
| 14:30 UTC+2 | | Report | Fet 24'; Helmersen 74' | Stadium: KFUM Arena; Attendance: 2 567; Referee: Rohit Saggi |

| 17 July 2026 14 | Bodø/Glimt | 1–0 | Fredrikstad | Bodø |
| 19:15 UTC+2 | Blomberg 45' (pen.) | Report | | Stadium: Aspmyra Stadion; Attendance: 7 442; Referee: Kristoffer Hagenes |

| 22 July 2026 2 | Bodø/Glimt | 3–0 | HamKam | Bodø |
| 19:00 UTC+2 | Helmersen 24', 50'; Berg 75' | Report | Ekeroth (yellow card) 71' | Stadium: Aspmyra Stadion; Attendance: 6 973; Referee: Sivert Øksnes Amland |
Note: This match was moved from March due to the cup quarter-finals vs Lillestrøm.

| 26 July 2026 15 | Sandefjord | 0–3 | Bodø/Glimt | Sandefjord |
| 17:00 UTC+2 | Berntsen (yellow card) 11'; Holten (yellow card) 46'; Apetorgbor (yellow card) 82' | Report | Brynhildsen 3'; Hauge 89'; Hansen (yellow card) 90' (goal) 90' | Stadium: Jotun Arena; Attendance: 6 598; Referee: Marius Waskaas Lien |

| 31 July 2026 16 | Bodø/Glimt | 4–0 | Lillestrøm | Bodø |
| 21:00 UTC+2 | | Report | | Stadium: Aspmyra Stadion |

| 8 August 2026 17 | Vålerenga | 1–2 | Bodø/Glimt | Oslo |
| 14:00 UTC+2 | | Report | | Stadium: Intility Arena |

| 30 August 2026 19 | Bodø/Glimt | 4–2 | Rosenborg | Bodø |
| 14:30 UTC+2 | | Report | | Stadium: Aspmyra Stadion; Attendance: 8,226 |

| 4 September 2026 20 | Fredrikstad | 1–2 | Bodø/Glimt | Fredrikstad |
| 19:00 UTC+2 | | Report | | Stadium: Fredrikstad Stadion; Attendance: 9,089 |

=== 2025–26 Norwegian Football Cup ===
| 5 March 2026 Fourth round | Molde | 1–2 | Bodø/Glimt | Molde |
| 19:00 CET (UTC+1) | Breivik 69' | Report | Auklend 32', 73' | Stadium: Aker Stadion; Referee: Ola Hobber Nilsen |

| 22 March 2026 Quarter-finals | Bodø/Glimt | 4–0 | Lillestrøm | Bodø |
| 19:15 CET (UTC+1) | Høgh 38', 59'; Auklend 48'; Evjen 52' | Report | Vá (yellow card) 36'; Arierhi (yellow card) 85' | Stadium: Aspmyra Stadion; Attendance: 4011; Referee: Daniel Higraff |

| 22 April 2026 Semi-finals | Bodø/Glimt | 2–1 (a.e.t.) | KFUM Oslo | Bodø |
| 18:00 CEST (UTC+2) | | Report | | Stadium: Aspmyra Stadion |

| 9 May 2026 Final | Bodø/Glimt | 3–3 (a.e.t.) (4–2 p) | Brann | Oslo |
| 18:00 CEST (UTC+2) | | Report | | Stadium: Ullevaal Stadion |

=== 2026–27 Norwegian Football Cup ===
| 26 August 2026 First round | Fauske/Sprint | v | Bodø/Glimt | Bodø |
| 18:00 CEST (UTC+2) | | Report | | Stadium: Aspmyra Stadion |
Note: This match was moved from August 22 due to the Champions League play-off matches vs NEC Nijmegen, and will be played at Aspmyra because Fauske/Sprint's home ground was not approved for this match.

=== 2025–26 UEFA Champions League ===
==== League phase ====
| Pos | Team | Pld | W | D | L | GF | GA | GD | Pts | Qualification |
|---|---|---|---|---|---|---|---|---|---|---|
| 21 | (French Football Federation) Monaco | 8 | 2 | 4 | 2 | 8 | 14 | −6 | 10 | Advance to knockout phase play-offs (unseeded) |
| 22 | (Association of Football Federations of Azerbaijan) Qarabağ | 8 | 3 | 1 | 4 | 13 | 21 | −8 | 10 | Advance to knockout phase play-offs (unseeded) |
| 23 | (Norwegian Football Federation) Bodø/Glimt | 8 | 2 | 3 | 3 | 14 | 15 | −1 | 9 | Advance to knockout phase play-offs (unseeded) |
| 24 | (Portuguese Football Federation) Benfica | 8 | 3 | 0 | 5 | 10 | 12 | −2 | 9 | Advance to knockout phase play-offs (unseeded) |
| 25 | (French Football Federation) Marseille | 8 | 3 | 0 | 5 | 11 | 14 | −3 | 9 | |

Source: UEFA
Rules for classification: League phase tiebreakers

Matches

The first 6 matches of the League phase were played during the 2025 season.

| 20 January 2026 7 | Bodø/Glimt (Norway) | 3–1 | (England) Manchester City | Bodø, Norway |
| 18:45 | Høgh 22', 24'; Hauge 58' | Report | Cherki 60' | Stadium: Aspmyra Stadion; Attendance: 8,016; Referee: Sven Jablonski (Germany) |

| 28 January 2026 8 | Atlético Madrid (Spain) | 1–2 | (Norway) Bodø/Glimt | Madrid, Spain |
| 21:00 | Sørloth 15' | Report | Sjøvold 34'; Høgh 59' | Stadium: Metropolitano Stadium; Attendance: 58,910; Referee: Maurizio Mariani (Italy) |

==== Knockout phase ====
Knockout phase play-offs

| 18 February 2026 First leg | Bodø/Glimt (Norway) | 3–1 | (Italy) Inter Milan | Bodø, Norway |
| 21:00 | Sondre Fet 20'; Hauge 61'; Høgh 64'; Blomberg (yellow card) 77' | Report | Esposito 30', (yellow card) 45' | Stadium: Aspmyra Stadion; Attendance: 7,845; Referee: Daniel Siebert (Germany) |

| 24 February 2026 Second leg | Inter Milan (Italy) | 1–2 (2–5 agg.) | (Norway) Bodø/Glimt | Milan, Italy |
| 21:00 | Bastoni 76' | Report | Hauge 58'; Gundersen (yellow card) 67'; Evjen 72' | Stadium: San Siro; Attendance: 70,441; Referee: Alejandro Hernández (Spain) |

Round of 16

| 11 March 2026 First leg | Bodø/Glimt (Norway) | 3–0 | (Portugal) Sporting CP | Bodø, Norway |
| 21:00 CET (UTC+1) | Fet 32' (pen.); Blomberg 45+1'; Høgh 71', (yellow card) 76'; Gundersen (yellow card) 44' | Report | Hjulmand (yellow card) 20' | Stadium: Aspmyra Stadion; Attendance: 7,971; Referee: Ivan Kružliak (Slovakia) |

| 17 March 2026 Second leg | Sporting CP (Portugal) | 5–0 (a.e.t.) (5–3 agg.) | (Norway) Bodø/Glimt | Lisbon, Portugal |
| 18:45 (17:45 UTC+0) | Inácio 34'; Gonçalves 61'; Suárez 78' (pen.); Araújo 92'; Nel 120+1' | Report | | Stadium: Estádio José Alvalade; Attendance: 49,155; Referee: Sandro Schärer (Switzerland) |

=== 2026–27 UEFA Champions League ===
==== Third qualifying round (League Path) ====
| 4 August 2026 First leg | Union Saint-Gilloise (Belgium) | 3–3 | (Norway) Bodø/Glimt | Ostend, Belgium |
| 20:00 CEST (UTC+2) | | Report | | Stadium: Batimont Solar Park; Referee: Irfan Peljto (Bosnia and Herzegovina) |
Note: The match was moved from Union Saint-Gilloise's home ground, Joseph Marien Stadium, as it is not approved for UCL matches.

| 11 August 2026 Second leg | Bodø/Glimt (Norway) | 3–2 (a.e.t.) (6–5 agg.) | (Belgium) Union Saint-Gilloise | Bodø |
| 18:00 CEST (UTC+2) | | Report | | Stadium: Aspmyra Stadion; Referee: István Kovács (Romania) |

==== Play-offs (League Path) ====
| 19 August 2026 First leg | NEC Nijmegen (Netherlands) | 1–3 | (Norway) Bodø/Glimt | Nijmegen, Netherlands |
| 21:00 CEST (UTC+2) | Storm (yellow card) 43'; Bischoff 85'; Monteiro (yellow card) 90+1' | Report | Brunstad Fet 25'; Helmersen 44'; Aleesami 50'; Brynhildsen (yellow card) 64' | Stadium: Goffertstadion; Attendance: 11,700; Referee: François Letexier |

| 25 August 2026 Second leg | Bodø/Glimt (Norway) | 3–0 (6–1 agg.) | NEC Nijmegen (Netherlands) | Bodø |
| 21:00 CEST (UTC+2) | Bjørkan 45+2'; Auklend 45+3'; Fonville 73' (o.g.) | Report | | Stadium: Aspmyra Stadion; Referee: Michael Oliver (England) |

==== League phase ====
The league phase draw was held on 27 August 2026.

| Pos | Team | Pld | W | D | L | GF | GA | GD | Pts | Qualification |
|---|---|---|---|---|---|---|---|---|---|---|
| 21 | (Netherlands) PSV Eindhoven | 3 | 1 | 1 | 1 | 2 | 2 | 0 | 4 | Advance to knockout phase play-offs (unseeded) |
| 22 | (Spain) Atlético Madrid | 4 | 1 | 1 | 2 | 4 | 5 | −1 | 4 | Advance to knockout phase play-offs (unseeded) |
| 23 | (Norway) Bodø/Glimt | 4 | 1 | 1 | 2 | 4 | 9 | −5 | 4 | Advance to knockout phase play-offs (unseeded) |
| 24 | (Italy) Napoli | 3 | 1 | 0 | 2 | 5 | 7 | −2 | 3 | Advance to knockout phase play-offs (unseeded) |
| 25 | (Azerbaijan) Sabah | 3 | 1 | 0 | 2 | 3 | 6 | −3 | 3 | |

Updated to match(es) played on 3 November 2026. Source: UEFA
Rules for classification: League phase tiebreakers

| Round | 1 | 2 | 3 | 4 | 5 | 6 | 7 | 8 |
|---|---|---|---|---|---|---|---|---|
| Ground | H | A | H | A | A | H | A | H |
| Result | L | W | L | D | | | | |
| Position | 36 | 24 | | | | | | |
| Points | 0 | 3 | 3 | 4 | | | | |

Updated to match(es) played on 3 November 2026. Source: UEFA
A = Away; H = Home; W = Win; D = Draw; L = Loss

| 10 September 2026 1 | Bayern Munich (Germany) | 5–0 | (Norway) Bodø/Glimt | Munich, Germany |
| 21:00 CEST | Musiala 47'; Kane 61'; Davies 77'; Olise 83', 90+2' | Report | Fet (yellow card) 58'; Bjørtuft (red card) 87' | Stadium: Allianz Arena; Attendance: 75,000; Referee: Rade Obrenović (Slovenia) |

| 14 October 2026 2 | Bodø/Glimt (Norway) | 1–0 | (Germany) Borussia Dortmund | Bodø |
| 21:00 | Sjøvold 52' | Report | Gadoi (yellow card) 13'; Silva (yellow card) 25' | Stadium: Aspmyra Stadion; Attendance: 7,885; Referee: Urs Schnyder (Switzerland) |

| 20 October 2026 3 | Napoli (Italy) | 4–3 | (Norway) Bodø/Glimt | Naples, Italy |
| 21:00 | Politano 1'; McTominay 41', 75'; Anguissa (yellow card) 48'; Lang (yellow card) 58'; Di Lorenzo (yellow card) 86'; Bjørtuft 88' (o.g.) | Report | Hague 27'; Helmersen 63'; Fet 90+4' | Stadium: Stadio Diego Armando Maradona; Attendance: 35,096; Referee: José María Sánchez Martínez (Spain) |

| 3 November 2026 4 | Bodø/Glimt (Norway) | 0–0 | (France) Lille | Bodø |
| 21:00 | | Report | Ngoy (yellow card) 83' | Stadium: Aspmyra Stadion; Attendance: 7,737; Referee: João Pinheiro (Portugal) |

| 24 November 2026 5 | Bodø/Glimt (Norway) | v | (Austria) LASK | Bodø |
| 18:45 | | Report | | Stadium: Aspmyra Stadion |

| 9 December 2026 6 | Lens (France) | v | (Norway) Bodø/Glimt | Lens, France |
| 21:00 | | Report | | Stadium: Stade Bollaert-Delelis |

| 19 January 2027 7 | Bodø/Glimt (Norway) | v | (Spain) Atlético Madrid | Bodø |
| 18:45 | | Report | | Stadium: Aspmyra Stadion |

| 27 January 2027 8 | Club Brugge (Belgium) | v | (Norway) Bodø/Glimt | Bruges, Belgium |
| 21:00 | | Report | | Stadium: Jan Breydel Stadium |

== Squad statistics ==
As of match played 20 January 2026

=== Appearances and goals ===
| No. | Pos | Nat | Player | Total | | Eliteserien | | 2025–26 Cup | | 2026–27 Cup | | 2025–26 UEFA Champions League | | 2026–27 UEFA Champions League | |
| No. | Pos | Nat | Player | Apps | Goals | Apps | Goals | Apps | Goals | Apps | Goals | Apps | Goals | Apps | Goals |
|---|---|---|---|---|---|---|---|---|---|---|---|---|---|---|---|
| 4 | DF | (Norway) NOR | Odin Bjørtuft | 1 | 0 | 0 | 0 | 0 | 0 | 0 | 0 | 1 | 0 | 0 | 0 |
| 6 | DF | (Norway) NOR | Jostein Gundersen | 1 | 0 | 0 | 0 | 0 | 0 | 0 | 0 | 1 | 0 | 0 | 0 |
| 7 | MF | (Norway) NOR | Patrick Berg | 1 | 0 | 0 | 0 | 0 | 0 | 0 | 0 | 1 | 0 | 0 | 0 |
| 8 | MF | (Norway) NOR | Sondre Auklend | 1 | 0 | 0 | 0 | 0 | 0 | 0 | 0 | 0+1 | 0 | 0 | 0 |
| 9 | FW | (Denmark) DEN | Kasper Høgh | 1 | 2 | 0 | 0 | 0 | 0 | 0 | 0 | 1 | 2 | 0 | 0 |
| 10 | FW | (Norway) NOR | Jens Petter Hauge | 1 | 1 | 0 | 0 | 0 | 0 | 0 | 0 | 1 | 1 | 0 | 0 |
| 11 | FW | (Norway) NOR | Ole Didrik Blomberg | 1 | 0 | 0 | 0 | 0 | 0 | 0 | 0 | 1 | 0 | 0 | 0 |
| 12 | GK | (Russia) RUS | Nikita Haikin | 1 | 0 | 0 | 0 | 0 | 0 | 0 | 0 | 1 | 0 | 0 | 0 |
| 14 | MF | (Norway) NOR | Ulrik Saltnes | 1 | 0 | 0 | 0 | 0 | 0 | 0 | 0 | 0+1 | 0 | 0 | 0 |
| 15 | DF | (Norway) NOR | Fredrik André Bjørkan | 1 | 0 | 0 | 0 | 0 | 0 | 0 | 0 | 1 | 0 | 0 | 0 |
| 19 | MF | (Norway) NOR | Sondre Brunstad Fet | 1 | 0 | 0 | 0 | 0 | 0 | 0 | 0 | 1 | 0 | 0 | 0 |
| 20 | DF | (Norway) NOR | Fredrik Sjøvold | 1 | 0 | 0 | 0 | 0 | 0 | 0 | 0 | 1 | 0 | 0 | 0 |
| 21 | FW | (Norway) NOR | Andreas Helmersen | 1 | 0 | 0 | 0 | 0 | 0 | 0 | 0 | 0+1 | 0 | 0 | 0 |
| 25 | DF | (Norway) NOR | Isak Dybvik Määttä | 1 | 0 | 0 | 0 | 0 | 0 | 0 | 0 | 0+1 | 0 | 0 | 0 |
| 26 | MF | (Norway) NOR | Håkon Evjen | 1 | 0 | 0 | 0 | 0 | 0 | 0 | 0 | 1 | 0 | 0 | 0 |
Players away from Bodø/Glimt on loan:
Players who appeared for Bodø/Glimt no longer at the club:

=== Goal scorers ===
| Rank | Pos. | No. | Nat. | Player | Eliteserien | 2025–26 Cup | 2026–27 Cup | 2025–26 UEFA Champions League | 2026–27 UEFA Champions League | Total |
|---|---|---|---|---|---|---|---|---|---|---|
| 1 | FW | 9 | (Denmark) | Kasper Høgh | 0 | 0 | 0 | 2 | 0 | 2 |
| 2 | FW | 10 | (Norway) | Jens Petter Hauge | 0 | 0 | 0 | 1 | 0 | 1 |
| TOTALS | | | | | 0 | 0 | 0 | 3 | 0 | 3 |
