= Evjen =

Evjen is a surname of Norwegian origin, derived from the Old Norse word efja, which refers to a place with stagnant water or a swamp. Notable people with the surname include:

- Andreas Evjen (born 1969), Norwegian footballer
- Håkon Evjen (born 2000), Norwegian footballer
- Tomas Evjen (1972–2012), Norwegian film creator
- Unni Evjen (1943–2019), Norwegian actress
