= 2025 FK Bodø/Glimt season =

Bodø/Glimt
2025 season
- President: Inge Henning Andersen
- Head Coach: Kjetil Knutsen
- Stadium: Aspmyra Stadion
- Eliteserien: 2nd
- 2025 Norwegian Football Cup: Third round
- 2025–26 Norwegian Football Cup: Fourth round
- 2024–25 UEFA Europa League: Semi-finals
- 2025–26 UEFA Champions League: Round of 16
- Top goalscorer: Kasper Høgh (17)
- Average home league attendance: 6,843
Home colours	Away colours	Third colours

The 2025 season was the 109th season in the history of FK Bodø/Glimt and their 8th consecutive season in the top flight of Norwegian football. In addition to the Eliteserien and the Norwegian Football Cup, Bodø/Glimt participated in the 2025–26 UEFA Champions League.

On 17 April 2025, Bodø/Glimt defeated Italian club Lazio in a penalty shootout in the second leg of their UEFA Europa League quarter-final, becoming the first Norwegian club to reach the semi-finals of a European competition.

== Current squad ==
As of 15 October 2025

Note: Flags indicate national team as defined under FIFA eligibility rules; some limited exceptions apply. Players may hold more than one non-FIFA nationality.

No.	Pos.	Nation	Player
1	GK	NOR	Julian Faye Lund
2	DF	DEN	Villads Nielsen
4	DF	NOR	Odin Bjørtuft
5	DF	NOR	Haitam Aleesami
6	DF	NOR	Jostein Gundersen
7	MF	NOR	Patrick Berg (captain)
8	MF	NOR	Sondre Auklend
9	FW	DEN	Kasper Høgh
10	FW	NOR	Jens Petter Hauge
11	FW	NOR	Ole Didrik Blomberg
12	GK	NOR	Nikita Haikin
14	MF	NOR	Ulrik Saltnes
15	DF	NOR	Fredrik André Bjørkan
17	FW	NOR	Ola Brynhildsen (on loan from Midtjylland)

No.	Pos.	Nation	Player
18	DF	NOR	Brede Moe
19	MF	NOR	Sondre Brunstad Fet
20	MF	NOR	Fredrik Sjøvold
21	FW	NOR	Andreas Helmersen
22	MF	DEN	Anders Klynge
23	MF	NOR	Magnus Bech Riisnæs
24	FW	NOR	Daniel Bassi
25	DF	NOR	Isak Dybvik Määttä
26	MF	NOR	Håkon Evjen
30	FW	DEN	Mathias Jørgensen
44	GK	NOR	Magnus Brøndbo
45	GK	NOR	Isak Sjong
77	FW	DEN	Mikkel Bro Hansen

For season transfers, see transfers winter 2024–25 and transfers summer 2024.

=== Out on loan ===
Note: Flags indicate national team as defined under FIFA eligibility rules; some limited exceptions apply. Players may hold more than one non-FIFA nationality.

No.	Pos.	Nation	Player
16	MF	NOR	Syver Skeide (at Kristiansund until 31 December 2025)
17	FW	SWE	Samuel Burakovsky (at Kolding until 30 June 2026)
94	FW	NOR	August Mikkelsen (at Tromsø until 31 December 2025)
–	MF	NGR	Gift Sunday (at Start until 31 December 2025)

== Pre-season and friendlies ==
Win Draw Loss Fixtures

9 January 2025 Friendly	Fortuna Düsseldorf (Germany)	3–2	(Norway) Bodø/Glimt	Marbella, Spain
15:00 CET (UTC+1)		Report		Stadium: Banus Football Center

15 January 2025 Friendly	Sparta Prague (Czech Republic)	3–0	(Norway) Bodø/Glimt	Marbella, Spain
14:00 CET (UTC+1)		Report		Stadium: Marbella Football Center

7 February 2025 Friendly	Aalborg (Denmark)	5–3	(Norway) Bodø/Glimt	Marbella, Spain
14:00 CET (UTC+1)		Report

22 March 2025 Friendly	Molde (Norway)	1–2	(Norway) Bodø/Glimt	Molde
16:00 CET (UTC+1)		Report		Stadium: Aker Stadion

15 June 2025 Friendly	Bodø/Glimt (Norway)	4–0	(Sweden) AIK	Bodø
15:00 CET (UTC+2)	Evjen 29'; Høgh 35'; Fet 48'; Bro Hansen 90'	Report		Stadium: Aspmyra Stadion

== Competitions ==
=== Overview ===
Competition	First match	Last match	Starting round	Final position	Record							
Competition	First match	Last match	Starting round	Final position	Pld	W	D	L	GF	GA	GD	Win %
Eliteserien	30 March 2025	30 November 2025	Matchday 1	2nd	30	22	4	4	85	28	+57	73.33
2025 Norwegian Football Cup	26 March 2025	12 May 2025	First round	Third round	3	2	0	1	13	2	+11	66.67
2025–26 Norwegian Football Cup	25 September 2025		Third round		1	1	0	0	3	1	+2	100.00
2024–25 UEFA Europa League	23 January 2025	8 May 2025	League Phase	Semi-finals	10	4	1	5	18	16	+2	40.00
2025–26 UEFA Champions League	20 August 2025	10 December 2025	Play-off round		8	1	3	4	15	15	+0	12.50
Total					52	30	8	14	134	62	+72	57.69

Source: Competitions

=== Eliteserien ===
==== League table ====
Pos	Team	Pld	W	D	L	GF	GA	GD	Pts	Qualification or relegation
1	Viking (C)	30	22	5	3	77	36	+41	71	Qualification for the Champions League play-off round
2	Bodø/Glimt	30	22	4	4	85	28	+57	70	Qualification for the Champions League third qualifying round (Note: Bodø/Glimt, as one of the two clubs with the highest club coefficient that would otherwise have entered the League Path second qualifying round, entered the League Path third qualifying round due to the rebalancing of the default access list.)
3	Tromsø	30	18	3	9	50	36	+14	57	Qualification for the Europa League second qualifying round (Note: Lillestrøm from the 2025 Norwegian First Division qualified for the Europa League play-off round as winners of the 2025 Norwegian Football Cup.)
4	Brann	30	17	5	8	55	46	+9	56	Qualification for the Conference League second qualifying round
5	Sandefjord	30	15	3	12	55	42	+13	48	

Source: Football Association of Norway (in Norwegian)
Rules for classification: 1) Points; 2) Goal difference; 3) Goals scored; 4) Head-to-head points; 5) Head-to-head goal difference; 6) Head-to-head goals scored.
(C) Champions

==== Results summary ====
Overall								Home						Away					
Pld	W	D	L	GF	GA	GD	Pts	W	D	L	GF	GA	GD	W	D	L	GF	GA	GD
1	1	0	0	1	0	+1	3	0	0	0	0	0	0	1	0	0	1	0	+1

Last updated: 30 March 2025.
Source: NFF

==== Results by round ====
Round	1	2
Ground	A	H
Result	W	W
Position	7	

Updated to match(es) played on 30 March 2025. Source: NFF
A = Away; H = Home; W = Win; D = Draw; L = Loss

==== Matches ====
The match schedule was announced on 20 December 2024.

30 March 2025 1	Bryne	0–1	Bodø/Glimt	Bryne
19:15 UTC+1		Report	Høgh 35'	Stadium: Bryne Stadion; Attendance: 5,151; Referee: Mohammad Usman Aslam

5 April 2025 2	Bodø/Glimt	3–0	HamKam	Bodø
16:00 UTC+2	Saltnes 5', 59'; Høgh 75'			Stadium: Aspmyra Stadion

21 April 2025 3	Molde	2–2	Bodø/Glimt	Molde
19:15 UTC+2	Berisha 78'; Sjøvold 85' (o.g.)	Report	Haugan 34' (o.g.); Sjøvold 44'	Stadium: Aker Stadion; Attendance: 6,940; Referee: Rohit Saggi

27 April 2025 4	Bodø/Glimt	3–0	KFUM	Bodø
17:00 UTC+2	Høgh 80', 87'; Saltnes 90'	Report		Stadium: Aspmyra Stadion; Attendance: 5,910; Referee: Mathias Støfringshaug

16 May 2025 7	Tromsø	2–1	Bodø/Glimt	Tromsø
18:00 UTC+2	Cornic 57'; Skjærvik 90+3'	Report	Høgh 39'	Stadium: Romssa Arena; Attendance: 6,691; Referee: Daniel Higraff

24 May 2025 8	Bodø/Glimt	4–0	Rosenborg	Bodø
18:00 UTC+2	Høgh 4'; Blomberg 18', 39'; Saltnes 52'	Report		Stadium: Aspmyra Stadion; Attendance: 8,107; Referee: Tore Hansen

28 May 2025 19	Bodø/Glimt	2–4	Viking	Bodø
21:00 UTC+2	Høgh 25'; Gundersen 44'	Report	Austbø 28'; Tripić 73'; Bjørshol 83'; Kvia-Egeskog 90+1'	Stadium: Aspmyra Stadion; Attendance: 6,869; Referee: Kristoffer Hagenes

1 June 2025 9	Haugesund	0–4	Bodø/Glimt	Haugesund
17:00 UTC+2		Report	Saltnes 7'; Hauge 50'; Blomberg 67'; Helmersen 87'	Stadium: Haugesund Sparebank Arena; Attendance: 4,335; Referee: Marius Hansen Grøtta

21 June 2025 10	Bodø/Glimt	3–0	Brann	Bodø
18:00 UTC+2	Blomberg 5'; Høgh 40'; Saltnes 47'	Report		Stadium: Aspmyra Stadion; Attendance: 7,325

29 June 2025 11	Bodø/Glimt	1–2	Sarpsborg 08	Bodø
17:00 UTC+2	Berg 34'	Report	Berget 37'; Tebo Uchenna 90+4'	Stadium: Aspmyra Stadion; Attendance: 6,440

5 July 2025 12	Kristiansund	1–1	Bodø/Glimt	Kristiansund
20:00 UTC+2	Alvheim 90+8'		Bjørtuft 9'	Stadium: Nordmøre Stadion; Referee: Sigurd Smehus Kringstad

12 July 2025 13	Bodø/Glimt	2–0	Sandefjord	Bodø
16:00 UTC+2	Blomberg 59'; Høgh 68' (pen.)	Report		Stadium: Aspmyra Stadion; Attendance: 6,939

16 July 2025 5	Fredrikstad	0–1	Bodø/Glimt	Fredrikstad
18:00 UTC+2		Report	Aleesami 87'	Stadium: Fredrikstad Stadion

19 July 2025 14	Viking	2–4	Bodø/Glimt	Stavanger
18:00 UTC+2	Christiansen 6'; Tripić 22' (pen.)	Report	Evjen 1'; Høgh 14'; Bjørtuft 38'; Bell 70' (o.g.)	Stadium: Lyse Arena; Attendance: 15,311; Referee: Marius Hansen Grøtta

26 July 2025 15	Bodø/Glimt	7–2	Vålerenga	Bodø
18:00 UTC+2	Saltnes 4'; Määttä 26'; Hauge 49'; Høgh 61'; Bjørtuft 72'; Fet 78'; Berg 87'	Report	Grundetjern 7'; Olsen 52'	Stadium: Aspmyra Stadion; Attendance: 7,677; Referee: Sivert Øksnes Amland

30 July 2025 6	Bodø/Glimt	1–0	Strømsgodset	Bodø
19:00 UTC+2	Evjen 13'	Report		Stadium: Aspmyra Stadion; Attendance: 7,340; Referee: Tore Hansen

3 August 2025 16	HamKam	1–3	Bodø/Glimt	Hamar
14:30 UTC+2	Jónsson 63'	Report	Høgh 2', 67'; Aleesami 44'	Stadium: Briskeby; Attendance: 6,118; Referee: Svein Tore Sinnes

9 August 2025 17	Bodø/Glimt	1–1	Tromsø	Bodø
19:15 UTC+2	Høgh 22' (pen.)	Report	Camões 45+1'	Stadium: Aspmyra Stadion; Attendance: 8,173; Referee: Ola Hobber Nilsen

15 August 2025 18	Strømsgodset	0–5	Bodø/Glimt	Drammen
19:00 UTC+2		Report	Høgh 10', 59'; Hauge 39'; Bjørkan 45'; Bassi 84'	Stadium: Marienlyst Stadion; Attendance: 6,302; Referee: Espen Andreas Eskås

31 August 2025 20	Sandefjord	1–2	Bodø/Glimt	Sandefjord
17:00 UTC+2	Mettler 52'	Report	Hauge 51'; Sigurðarson 71' (o.g.)	Stadium: Jotun Arena; Attendance: 6,598

12 September 2025 21	Bodø/Glimt	7–1	Kristiansund	Bodø
19:00 UTC+2	Evjen 10'; Bjørtuft 40'; Hauge 45'; Jørgensen 66'; Fet 71'; Berg 77'; Bro Hansen 90'	Report	Ndour 85'	Stadium: Aspmyra Stadion; Attendance: 6,822

21 September 2025 22	Rosenborg	1–1	Bodø/Glimt	Trondheim
14:30 UTC+2	Aleesami 70' (o.g.)	Report	Hauge 6'	Stadium: Lerkendal Stadion; Attendance: 21,078

5 October 2025 24	Bodø/Glimt	2–0	Haugesund	Bodø
17:00 UTC+2	Sjøvold 15'; Helmersen 74'	Report		Stadium: Aspmyra Stadion; Attendance: 6,020

18 October 2025 25	Sarpsborg 08	2–5	Bodø/Glimt	Sarpsborg
14:00 UTC+2	Karlsbakk 24'; Sørli 66'	Report	Bjørtuft 6', 69'; Hauge 41'; Sjøvold 53'; Høgh 72'	Stadium: Sarpsborg Stadion; Attendance: 5,632; Referee: Mohammad Usman Aslam

26 October 2025 26	Bodø/Glimt	4–1	Molde	Bodø
17:00 UTC+2	Berg 15'; Fet 38' (pen.); Evjen 65'; Helmersen 83'	Report	Spiten-Nysæter 44'	Stadium: Aspmyra Stadion; Attendance: 6,385; Referee: Ola Hobber Nilsen

1 November 2025 27	Vålerenga	3–1	Bodø/Glimt	Oslo
16:00 UTC+2	Bjørdal 32'; Strand 45+2'; Grundetjern 47'	Report	Auklend 64'	Stadium: Intility Arena; Attendance: 14,221; Referee: Sigurd Smehus Kringstad

9 November 2025 28	Bodø/Glimt	5–0	Bryne	Bodø
17:00 UTC+2	Bjørkan 16'; Berg 68'; Helmersen 70'; Fet 84'; Jørgensen 87'	Report		Stadium: Aspmyra Stadion; Attendance: 6,036; Referee: Stian Røvig Sletner

21 November 2025 29	KFUM	1–2	Bodø/Glimt	Oslo
19:00 UTC+2	Haltvik 46'	Report	Sjøvold 30'; Jørgensen 90+4'	Stadium: KFUM Arena; Attendance: 2,869; Referee: Mohammad Usman Aslam

30 November 2025 30	Bodø/Glimt	5–0	Fredrikstad	Bodø
17:00 UTC+2	Hauge 37'; Bjørkan 42'; Blomberg 45+2'; Helmersen 61'; Jørgensen 73'	Report		Stadium: Aspmyra Stadion; Attendance: 6,596; Referee: Marius Hansen Grøtta

=== 2025 Norwegian Football Cup ===
26 March 2025 First round	Innstranda IL	0–8	Bodø/Glimt	Bodø
18:00 UTC+1		Report	Sørli 19'; Määttä 20'; Bro Hansen 22', 34', 38'; Saltnes 27', 29'; Helmersen 75'	Stadium: Aspmyra Stadion; Referee: Mohammad Hafezi

24 April 2025 Second round	Junkeren	1–5	Bodø/Glimt	Bodø
18:00 UTC+2	Chooly 73'	Report	Bro Hansen 3', 61', 76'; Berg 38'; Høgh 82' (pen.)	Stadium: Aspmyra Stadion; Referee: Even Andreas Richter Eliassen

12 May 2025 Third round	Aalesund	1–0	Bodø/Glimt	Ålesund
19:00 UTC+2	Andresen 52'	Report		Stadium: Color Line Stadion; Attendance: 3,008; Referee: Marius Lien

=== 2025–26 Norwegian Football Cup ===
25 September 2025 Third Round	Odd	1–3	Bodø/Glimt	Skien
20:00 UTC+2	Hagen 51'	Report	Riisnæs 48'; Helmersen 62'; Hauge 90+6'	Stadium: Skagerak Arena; Attendance: 6,278; Referee: Sigurd Kringstad

=== 2024–25 UEFA Europa League ===
==== League phase ====
Pos	Team	Pld	W	D	L	GF	GA	GD	Pts	Qualification
7	(Hellenic Football Federation) Olympiacos	8	4	3	1	9	3	+6	15	Advance to round of 16 (seeded)
8	(Scottish Football Association) Rangers	8	4	2	2	16	10	+6	14	Advance to round of 16 (seeded)
9	(Norwegian Football Federation) Bodø/Glimt	8	4	2	2	14	11	+3	14	Advance to knockout phase play-offs (seeded)
10	(Royal Belgian Football Association) Anderlecht	8	4	2	2	14	12	+2	14	Advance to knockout phase play-offs (seeded)
11	(Romanian Football Federation) FCSB	8	4	2	2	10	9	+1	14	Advance to knockout phase play-offs (seeded)

Source: UEFA
Rules for classification: League phase tiebreakers

Matches

The first six matches of the League phase were played as part of the 2024 season.

23 January 2025 7	Bodø/Glimt (Norway)	3–1	(Israel) Maccabi Tel Aviv	Bodø
18:45 CET (UTC+1)	Høgh 39', 65' (pen.); Evjen 62'	Report	Peretz 12'	Stadium: Aspmyra Stadion; Attendance: 3,989; Referee: Ricardo de Burgos Bengoetxea (Spain)

30 January 2025 8	Nice (France)	1–1	(Norway) Bodø/Glimt	Nice
21:00 CET (UTC+1)	Bouanani 74'	Report	Bjørkan 54'	Stadium: Allianz Riviera; Attendance: 4,294; Referee: Juxhin Xhaja (Albania)

==== Knockout phase ====
===== Knockout phase play-offs =====
The draw for the knockout phase play-offs was held on 31 January 2025.

13 February 2025 First leg	Twente (Netherlands)	2–1	(Norway) Bodø/Glimt	Enschede
21:00 CET (UTC+1)	Ltaief 5'; Van Wolfswinkel 90+5' (pen.)	Report	Berg 85'	Stadium: De Grolsch Veste; Attendance: 29,500; Referee: Sebastian Gishamer (Austria)

20 February 2025 Second leg	Bodø/Glimt (Norway)	5–2 (a.e.t.) (6–4 agg.)	(Netherlands) Twente	Bodø
18:45 CET (UTC+1)	Høgh 56' (pen.); Hilgers 90+2' (o.g.); Wembangomo 90+4'; Fet 111'; Verschueren 114' (o.g.)	Report	Sjøvold 26' (o.g.); Steijn 90+6'	Stadium: Aspmyra Stadion; Attendance: 6,417; Referee: Alejandro Hernández Hernández (Spain)

===== Round of 16 =====
The draw for the round of 16 was held on 21 February 2025.

6 March 2025 First leg	Bodø/Glimt (Norway)	3–0	(Greece) Olympiacos	Bodø
21:00 CET (UTC+1)	Tzolakis 13' (o.g.); Høgh 45', 55'	Report		Stadium: Aspmyra Stadion; Attendance: 8,050; Referee: Mykola Balakin (Ukraine)

13 March 2025 Second leg	Olympiacos (Greece)	2–1 (2–4 agg.)	(Norway) Bodø/Glimt	Piraeus
19:45 EET (UTC+2)	Yaremchuk 53', 65'	Report	Høgh 36'	Stadium: Karaiskakis Stadium; Attendance: 31,850; Referee: Felix Zwayer (Germany)

===== Quarter-finals =====
The draw for the quarter-finals was held on 21 February 2025.

10 April 2025 First leg	Bodø/Glimt (Norway)	2–0	(Italy) Lazio	Bodø
18:45 CEST (UTC+2)	Saltnes 47', 69'	Report	Zaccagni (yellow card) 34'; Castellanos (yellow card) 73'; Romagnoli (yellow card) 90+2'	Stadium: Aspmyra Stadion; Referee: Michael Oliver (England)

17 April 2025 Second leg	Lazio (Italy)	3–1 (a.e.t.) (3–3 agg.) (2–3 p)	(Norway) Bodø/Glimt	Rome, Italy
21:00 CEST (UTC+2)	Castellanos 21'; Rovella (yellow card) 22'; Noslin 90+3'; Dia 100'; Lazzari (yellow card) 103'	Report	Høgh (yellow card) 35'; Evjen (yellow card) 63'; Helmersen (yellow card) 77' (yellow-red card) 120', (goal) 109'; Berg (yellow card) 80'; Sjøvold (yellow card) 102'	Stadium: Stadio Olimpico; Attendance: 54,873; Referee: Daniel Siebert (Germany)
	Penalties
	Dia (penalty scored); Tchaouna (penalty missed); Noslin (penalty missed); Guendouzi (penalty scored); Castellanos (penalty missed)		(penalty missed) Hauge; (penalty scored) Fet; (penalty scored) Sørli; (penalty scored) Moe; (penalty missed) Berg

===== Semi-finals =====
The draw for the order of the semi-final legs was held on 21 February 2025, after the draw for the round of 16 and quarter-finals.

1 May 2025 First leg	Tottenham Hotspur (England)	3–1	(Norway) Bodø/Glimt	London, England
20:00 BST	Johnson 1'; Maddison 34'; Solanke 61' (pen.); Romero (yellow card) 73'	Report	Bjørkan (yellow card) 57'; Hauge (yellow card) 76'; Saltnes 83'	Stadium: Tottenham Hotspur Stadium; Attendance: 61,327; Referee: José María Sánchez Martínez (Spain)

8 May 2025 Second leg	Bodø/Glimt (Norway)	0–2 (1–5 agg.)	(England) Tottenham Hotspur	Bodø
21:00 CEST	Høgh (yellow card) 26'	Report	Johnson (yellow card) 33'; Solanke 63'; Vicario (yellow card) 66'; Porro 69'	Stadium: Aspmyra Stadion; Attendance: 8,030; Referee: Maurizio Mariani (Italy)

=== 2025–26 UEFA Champions League ===
==== Play-off round ====
The draw for the play-off round was held on 4 August 2025. Bodø/Glimt was one of the seeded teams.

20 August 2025 First leg	Bodø/Glimt (Norway)	5–0	(Austria) Sturm Graz	Bodø
21:00	Høgh 7'; Bjørtuft 10'; Saltnes 25'; Evjen 54'; Bøving 79' (o.g.)	Report		Stadium: Aspmyra Stadion; Referee: Sandro Schärer (Switzerland)

26 August 2025 Second leg	Sturm Graz (Austria)	2–1 (2–6 agg.)	(Norway) Bodø/Glimt	Klagenfurt, Austria
21:00	Jatta 30'; Oermann 73'	Report	Jørgensen 15'	Stadium: Wörthersee Stadion (Note: Sturm Graz played their home matches at Wörthersee Stadion in Klagenfurt, instead of their regular stadium, Liebenauer Stadium in Graz, which did not meet UEFA requirements.); Referee: Szymon Marciniak (Poland)

==== League phase ====
Pos	Team	Pld	W	D	L	GF	GA	GD	Pts	Qualification
21	(French Football Federation) Monaco	8	2	4	2	8	14	−6	10	Advance to knockout phase play-offs (unseeded)
22	(Association of Football Federations of Azerbaijan) Qarabağ	8	3	1	4	13	21	−8	10	Advance to knockout phase play-offs (unseeded)
23	(Norwegian Football Federation) Bodø/Glimt	8	2	3	3	14	15	−1	9	Advance to knockout phase play-offs (unseeded)
24	(Portuguese Football Federation) Benfica	8	3	0	5	10	12	−2	9	Advance to knockout phase play-offs (unseeded)
25	(French Football Federation) Marseille	8	3	0	5	11	14	−3	9	

Source: UEFA
Rules for classification: League phase tiebreakers

Matches

17 September 2025 1	Slavia Prague (Czech Republic)	2–2	(Norway) Bodø/Glimt	Prague
18:45	Mbodji 23', 74'	Report	Bassi 78'; Brunstad Fet 90'	Stadium: Fortuna Arena; Attendance: 18,922; Referee: Marian Barbu (Romania)

30 September 2025 2	Bodø/Glimt (Norway)	2–2	(England) Tottenham Hotspur	Bodø
21:00	Hauge 53', 66'	Report	Van de Ven 68'; Gundersen 89' (o.g.)	Stadium: Aspmyra Stadion; Attendance: 7,988; Referee: Ivan Kružliak (Slovakia)

22 October 2025 3	Galatasaray (Turkey)	3–1	(Norway) Bodø/Glimt	Istanbul
18:45 (19:45 UTC+3)	Osimhen 3', 33'; Akgün 60'	Report	Helmersen 75'	Stadium: Rams Park; Attendance: 45,275; Referee: Michael Oliver (England)

4 November 2025 4	Bodø/Glimt (Norway)	0–1	(France) Monaco	Bodø
21:00		Report	Balogun 43'	Stadium: Aspmyra Stadion; Attendance: 7,842; Referee: Damian Sylwestrzak (Poland)

25 November 2025 5	Bodø/Glimt (Norway)	2–3	(Italy) Juventus	Bodø
21:00	Blomberg 27'; Fet 87' (pen.)	Report	Kelly (yellow card) 39'; Openda 48'; Miretti (yellow card) 50'; McKennie 59'; Cabal (yellow card) 84'; David 90+1'; McKennie (yellow card) 90+4'	Stadium: Aspmyra Stadion; Attendance: 7,824; Referee: Danny Makkelie (Netherlands)

10 December 2025 6	Borussia Dortmund (Germany)	2–2	(Norway) Bodø/Glimt	Dortmund
21:00	Brandt 18', 51'	Report	Aleesami 42'; Hauge 75'	Stadium: Westfalenstadion; Attendance: 81,365; Referee: Erik Lambrechts (Belgium)

The last 2 matches of the League phase were played during the 2026 season.

== Squad statistics ==
As of match played 24 May 2025

=== Appearances and goals ===
No.	Pos	Nat	Player	Total		Eliteserien		Norwegian Cup		UEFA Champions League		UEFA Europa League	
No.	Pos	Nat	Player	Apps	Goals	Apps	Goals	Apps	Goals	Apps	Goals	Apps	Goals
1	GK	(Norway) NOR	Julian Faye Lund	2	0	0	0	2	0	0	0	0	0
2	DF	(Denmark) DEN	Villads Nielsen	21	0	3+5	0	3	0	1+2	0	4+3	0
4	DF	(Norway) NOR	Odin Bjørtuft	32	5	18+3	4	1	0	4	1	5+1	0
5	DF	(Norway) NOR	Haitam Aleesami	27	2	12+9	2	2+1	0	3	0	0	0
6	DF	(Norway) NOR	Jostein Gundersen	27	1	12+2	1	1	0	1+1	0	10	0
7	MF	(Norway) NOR	Patrick Berg	36	5	18+3	3	2	1	4	0	9	1
8	MF	(Norway) NOR	Sondre Auklend	27	0	7+8	0	2+1	0	2+2	0	0+5	0
9	FW	(Denmark) DEN	Kasper Høgh	38	24	20+2	16	0+2	1	4	1	10	6
10	FW	(Norway) NOR	Jens Petter Hauge	38	8	21+1	6	1+1	0	4	2	9+1	0
11	FW	(Norway) NOR	Ole Didrik Blomberg	23	5	12+1	5	0+1	0	0+1	0	8	0
12	GK	(Russia) RUS	Nikita Haikin	39	0	24	0	1	0	4	0	10	0
14	MF	(Norway) NOR	Ulrik Saltnes	33	12	19	6	1+1	2	2	1	9+1	3
15	DF	(Norway) NOR	Fredrik André Bjørkan	36	2	22	1	1	0	3	0	10	1
17	FW	(Norway) NOR	Ola Brynhildsen	1	0	1	0	0	0	0	0	0	0
18	DF	(Norway) NOR	Brede Moe	7	0	1+1	0	1+1	0	0	0	1+2	0
19	MF	(Norway) NOR	Sondre Brunstad Fet	28	4	2+14	2	2	0	1+1	1	2+6	1
20	DF	(Norway) NOR	Fredrik Sjøvold	39	2	23	2	1+1	0	4	0	10	0
21	FW	(Norway) NOR	Andreas Helmersen	28	4	2+13	2	0+1	1	0+3	0	0+9	1
22	MF	(Denmark) DEN	Anders Klynge	11	0	2+7	0	0	0	0+2	0	0	0
23	MF	(Norway) NOR	Magnus Bech Riisnæs	8	0	1+5	0	0	0	0+2	0	0	0
24	FW	(Norway) NOR	Daniel Bassi	13	2	1+7	1	2	0	0+3	1	0	0
25	FW	(Norway) NOR	Isak Dybvik Määttä	32	2	6+13	1	2	1	1	0	3+7	0
26	MF	(Norway) NOR	Håkon Evjen	37	5	23	3	0+1	0	4	1	9	1
30	FW	(Denmark) DEN	Mathias Jørgensen	9	2	3+3	1	0	0	2+1	1	0	0
37	DF	(Norway) NOR	Magnus Fagervik Antonsen	1	0	0	0	0+1	0	0	0	0	0
39	DF	(Norway) NOR	Cassander Krane Dreyer	1	0	0	0	0+1	0	0	0	0	0
40	FW	(Poland) POL	Eryk Lukaszka	1	0	0	0	0+1	0	0	0	0	0
77	FW	(Denmark) DEN	Mikkel Bro Hansen	9	7	0+5	1	3	6	0+1	0	0	0
Players away from Bodø/Glimt on loan:
16	MF	(Norway) NOR	Syver Skeide	0	0	0	0	0	0	0	0	0	0
17	FW	(Sweden) SWE	Samuel Burakovsky	1	0	0	0	0+1	0	0	0	0	0
94	FW	(Norway) NOR	August Mikkelsen	1	0	0	0	1	0	0	0	0	0
Players who appeared for Bodø/Glimt no longer at the club:
5	DF	(Norway) NOR	Brice Wembangomo	2	1	0	0	0	0	0	0	0+2	1
27	MF	(Norway) NOR	Sondre Sørli	16	1	1+5	0	3	1	0	0	1+6	0
95	MF	(Denmark) DEN	Jeppe Kjær	6	0	0+3	0	1	0	0	0	0+2	0
99	FW	(Slovenia) SLO	Nino Žugelj	2	0	0	0	0	0	0	0	0+2	0

=== Goal scorers ===
Rank	Pos.	No.	Nat.	Player	Eliteserien	Norwegian Cup	UEFA Champions League	UEFA Europa League	Total
1	FW	9	(Denmark)	Kasper Høgh	16	1	1	6	24
2	MF	14	(Norway)	Ulrik Saltnes	6	2	1	3	12
3	FW	10	(Norway)	Jens Petter Hauge	6	0	2	0	8
4	FW	77	(Denmark)	Mikkel Bro Hansen	1	6	0	0	7
4				Own goal	3	0	1	3	7
6	FW	11	(Norway)	Ole Didrik Blomberg	5	0	0	0	5
6	DF	4	(Norway)	Odin Bjørtuft	4	0	1	0	5
6	MF	7	(Norway)	Patrick Berg	3	1	0	1	5
6	MF	26	(Norway)	Håkon Evjen	3	0	1	1	5
10	MF	19	(Norway)	Sondre Brunstad Fet	2	0	1	1	4
10	FW	21	(Norway)	Andreas Helmersen	2	1	0	1	4
12	DF	5	(Norway)	Haitam Aleesami	2	0	0	0	2
12	DF	20	(Norway)	Fredrik Sjøvold	2	0	0	0	2
12	DF	15	(Norway)	Fredrik André Bjørkan	1	0	0	1	2
12	FW	24	(Norway)	Daniel Bassi	1	0	1	0	2
12	FW	25	(Norway)	Isak Dybvik Määttä	1	1	0	0	2
12	FW	30	(Denmark)	Mathias Jørgensen	1	0	1	0	2
18	DF	6	(Norway)	Jostein Gundersen	1	0	0	0	1
18	DF	5	(Norway)	Brice Wembangomo	0	0	0	1	1
18	MF	27	(Norway)	Sondre Sørli	0	1	0	0	1
TOTALS					60	13	10	18	101

=== Clean sheets ===
Rank	Pos.	No.	Nat.	Player	Eliteserien	Norwegian Cup	UEFA Champions League	UEFA Europa League	Total
1	GK	12	(Russia)	Nikita Haikin	11	0	1	2	14
2	GK	1	(Norway)	Julian Faye Lund	0	1	0	0	1
TOTALS					11	1	1	2	15

=== Disciplinary record ===
No.	Pos.	Nat.	Name	Eliteserien		Norwegian Cup		UEFA Champions League		UEFA Europa League		Total	
No.	Pos.	Nat.	Name	Yellow card	Red card	Yellow card	Red card	Yellow card	Red card	Yellow card	Red card	Yellow card	Red card
2	DF	(Denmark)	Villads Nielsen	0	0	0	0	1	0	0	0	1	0
4	DF	(Norway)	Odin Bjørtuft	2	0	0	0	1	0	0	0	3	0
5	DF	(Norway)	Haitam Aleesami	0	0	0	0	1	0	0	0	1	0
6	DF	(Norway)	Jostein Gundersen	0	0	0	0	0	0	1	0	1	0
7	MF	(Norway)	Patrick Berg	2	0	0	0	3	0	1	0	6	0
8	MF	(Norway)	Sondre Auklend	0	0	0	0	1	0	0	0	1	0
9	FW	(Denmark)	Kasper Høgh	0	0	0	0	0	0	2	0	2	0
10	FW	(Norway)	Jens Petter Hauge	2	0	0	0	0	0	2	0	4	0
11	FW	(Norway)	Ole Didrik Blomberg	1	0	0	0	0	0	0	0	1	0
12	GK	(Russia)	Nikita Haikin	1	0	0	0	0	0	1	0	2	0
14	MF	(Norway)	Ulrik Saltnes	0	0	0	0	0	0	1	0	1	0
15	DF	(Norway)	Fredrik André Bjørkan	1	0	0	0	0	0	2	0	3	0
20	DF	(Norway)	Fredrik Sjøvold	1	0	0	0	0	0	2	0	3	0
21	FW	(Norway)	Andreas Helmersen	0	0	0	0	0	0	0	1	0	1
22	MF	(Denmark)	Anders Klynge	1	0	0	0	0	0	0	0	1	0
25	FW	(Norway)	Isak Dybvik Määttä	2	0	0	0	0	0	0	0	2	0
26	MF	(Norway)	Håkon Evjen	3	0	0	0	0	0	2	0	5	0
Players away from Bodø/Glimt on loan:
Players who appeared for Bodø/Glimt no longer at the club:
95	FW	(Denmark)	Jeppe Kjær	0	0	1	0	0	0	0	0	1	0
TOTALS				16	0	1	0	7	0	15	1	39	1
