= Magnus Riisnæs =

Norwegian footballer (born 2004)

Personal information
- Full name: Magnus Bech Riisnæs
- Date of birth: 4 November 2004 (age 21)
- Place of birth: Lørenskog, Norway
- Height: 1.82 m (6 ft 0 in)
- Position: Midfielder

Team information
- Current team: Bodø/Glimt
- Number: 23

Youth career
- –2018: Lørenskog
- 2019: Vålerenga

Senior career*
Years	Team	Apps	(Gls)
2020–2024	Vålerenga 2	43	(11)
2021–2025	Vålerenga	77	(6)
2025–	Bodø/Glimt	10	(0)

International career^{‡}
2019	Norway U15	1	(0)
2020	Norway U16	3	(0)
2021	Norway U17	4	(0)
2022	Norway U18	8	(0)
2023	Norway U19	3	(1)
2023	Norway U20	1	(0)
2023–2025	Norway U21	3	(0)
- * Club domestic league appearances and goals as of 31 July 2026 ‡ National team caps and goals as of 24 August 2025

Magnus Bech Riisnæs (born 4 November 2004) is a Norwegian professional footballer who plays as a midfielder for Bodø/Glimt.

== Club career ==
Riisnæs played youth football for Lørenskog, before joining the academy of Vålerenga in 2019. He made his first team debut at age 16, as a substitute in the cup match against rivals Lyn in July 2021. He made his Eliteserien debut for Vålerenga as a substitute against Mjøndalen in December 2021.

On 15 July 2025, Riisnæs signed for Eliteserien club FK Bodø/Glimt for a fee of €2.5 million. He joined on a four-year contract until June 2029. The number 23 was handed to him upon his arrival. He made his debut for the club in a 1–0 away win against Fredrikstad in the Eliteserien, coming on as a late substitute. His first start was in a 7–1 victory against Kristiansund BK. He scored his first goal against Odds BK. His first trophy with the club was the 2025-26 Norgesmesterskapet.

== International career ==
Since 2019, Riisnæs has played for the Norway U16, U18, U19 and U21.

== Style of Play ==
Riisnæs usually plays as a central midfielder, but can also play as a right-back or right winger.

== Personal life ==
Magnus Bech Riisnæs is the son of former footballer Dag Riisnæs.

== Career statistics ==
As of 31 July 2026

Appearances and goals by club, season and competition
Club	Season	League			National Cup		Other		Total	
Club	Season	Division	Apps	Goals	Apps	Goals	Apps	Goals	Apps	Goals
Vålerenga 2	2020	2. divisjon	7	0	—		—		7	0
Vålerenga 2	2021	2. divisjon	16	3	—		—		16	3
Vålerenga 2	2022	2. divisjon	16	8	—		—		16	8
Vålerenga 2	2023	2. divisjon	2	0	—		—		2	0
Vålerenga 2	2024	2. divisjon	2	0	—		—		2	0
Vålerenga 2	Total		43	11	—		—		43	11
Vålerenga	2021	Eliteserien	1	0	2	0	—		3	0
Vålerenga	2022	Eliteserien	14	0	2	0	—		16	0
Vålerenga	2023	Eliteserien	28	1	6	1	2 (Note: Appearances in Eliteserien play-offs)	0	36	2
Vålerenga	2024	1. divisjon	23	3	4	3	—		27	6
Vålerenga	2025	Eliteserien	11	2	1	0	—		12	2
Vålerenga	Total		77	6	15	4	2	0	94	10
Bodø/Glimt	2025	Eliteserien	7	0	1	1	2 (Note: Two appearances in UEFA Champions League)	0	10	1
Bodø/Glimt	2026	Eliteserien	3	0	0	0	0	0	3	0
Bodø/Glimt	Total		10	0	1	1	2	0	13	1
Career total			130	18	16	4	4	0	150	22

== Honours ==
Bodø/Glimt

- Norwegian Football Cup: 2025–26

Individual

- Eliteserien Young Player of the Month: September 2023
