= Villads Nielsen =

Danish footballer (born 2005)

Personal information
- Full name: Villads Schmidt Nielsen
- Date of birth: 29 January 2005 (age 21)
- Place of birth: Frederiksværk, Denmark
- Height: 1.92 m (6 ft 4 in)
- Position: Centre-back

Team information
- Current team: Bodø/Glimt
- Number: 2

Youth career
- Frederiksværk FK
- Helsinge Fodbold
- Nordsjælland

Senior career*
Years	Team	Apps	(Gls)
2024–	Bodø/Glimt	26	(0)

International career^{‡}
2023	Denmark U-18	1	(0)
2023–2024	Denmark U-19	14	(0)
2024–2025	Denmark U-20	7	(0)
2025–	Denmark U-21	4	(0)
- * Club domestic league appearances and goals as of 14:26, 17 October 2026 (UTC) ‡ National team caps and goals as of 21:34, 25 January 2026 (UTC)

Villads Schmidt Nielsen (born 29 January 2005) is a Danish footballer who plays as a centre-back for Norwegian Eliteserien club Bodø/Glimt.

== Club career ==
=== Bodø/Glimt ===
Nielsen is a product of FC Nordsjælland. Here, he spent nine years of his youth career, before moving to Norwegian club FK Bodø/Glimt on 30 March 2024. Here he signed a deal until June 2028.

Nielsen made his debut for Bodø/Glimt on 9 April 2024 in a Norwegian Football Cup match against Brønnøysund IL. He also played the following match in the cup on 24 April, but then had to watch from the bench until 10 August 2024, when he made his Eliteserien debut against Viking FK. On 25 September 2024, he also made his European debut for Bodø/Glimt, starting in a UEFA Europa League match against FC Porto. On 23 October 2024, Villads secured an important away win for Bodø/Glimt in a UEFA Europa League match against S.C. Braga when he scored the winner in the final seconds of the game.

== Career statistics ==
As of match played 17 October 2026

Appearances and goals by club, season and competition
Club	Season	League			Norwegian Cup		Europe		Total	
Club	Season	Division	Apps	Goals	Apps	Goals	Apps	Goals	Apps	Goals
Bodø/Glimt	2024	Eliteserien	9	0	2	0	11 (Note: Appearances in UEFA Europa League)	1	22	1
Bodø/Glimt	2025	Eliteserien	11	0	4	0	6 (Note: Appearances in UEFA Champions League)	0	21	0
Bodø/Glimt	2026	Eliteserien	6	0	0	0	4	0	10	0
Career total			26	0	6	0	21	1	53	1

== Honours ==
Bodø/Glimt

- Eliteserien: 2024
