= Patrick Berg =

Norwegian footballer (born 1997)

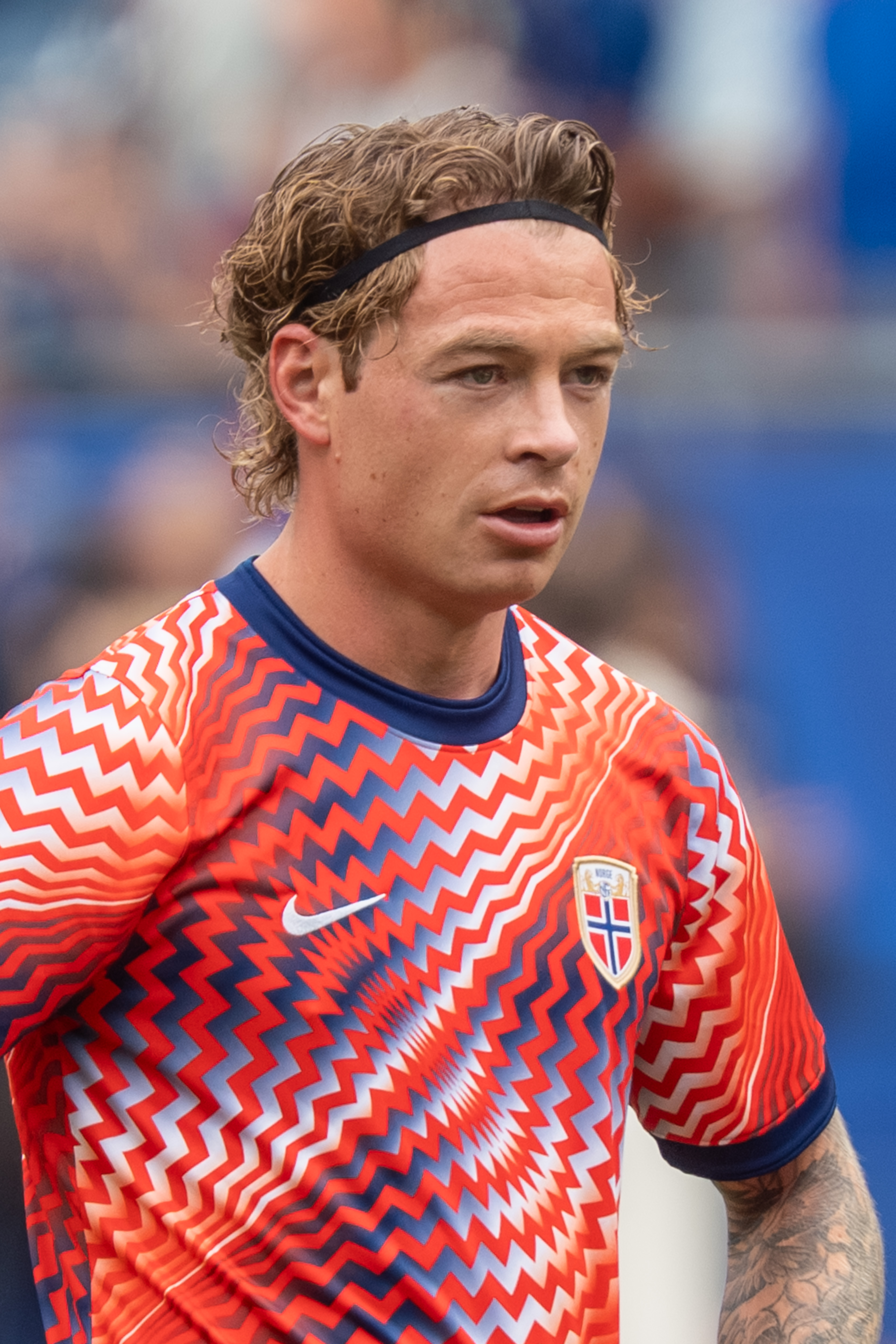
- Berg with Norway in 2026

Personal information
- Date of birth: 24 November 1997 (age 28)
- Place of birth: Bodø, Norway
- Height: 1.78 m (5 ft 10 in)
- Position: Defensive midfielder

Team information
- Current team: Bodø/Glimt
- Number: 7

Youth career
- Bodø/Glimt

Senior career*
Years	Team	Apps	(Gls)
2014–2022	Bodø/Glimt	137	(8)
2022	Lens	17	(0)
2022–	Bodø/Glimt	122	(20)

International career^{‡}
2014	Norway U17	8	(0)
2015	Norway U18	9	(0)
2016	Norway U19	3	(0)
2021–	Norway	54	(0)
- * Club domestic league appearances and goals as of 20 November 2026 ‡ National team caps and goals as of 17 November 2026

Patrick Berg (24 November 1997) is a Norwegian professional footballer who plays as a defensive midfielder for Eliteserien club Bodø/Glimt and the Norway national team.

== Club career ==
=== Bodø/Glimt ===
Berg was born in Bodø. He made his senior debut for Bodø/Glimt on 12 July 2014 in a 3–0 loss to Odd.

Berg was appointed captain of the first team during the 2020 season. That year, he took part in his club's historic triumph, with FK Bodø/Glimt winning the Norwegian league championship for the first time in its history.

He was crowned Norwegian champion again in 2021.

=== Lens ===
On 20 December 2021, Berg officially joined Lens. He signed a contract running until June 2026, and the transfer fee paid to Bodø/Glimt was estimated at €4.5 million. The transfer became effective on 1 January 2022.

He made his debut in a Lens shirt on 4 January 2022, in the Coupe de France derby against Lille, coming on in the 75th minute in place of Kevin Danso. The match ended 2–2, with Lens winning on penalties. He came very close to providing an assist to his teammate Ibrahima Baldé in the 90th minute.

He made his first start on 5 February 2022, against Lorient, following the suspension of Cheick Doucouré, in a 2–0 defeat. He then went on to make a series of substitute appearances. On 16 April 2022, he started against Lille in a 2–1 victory, delivering a highly convincing performance. He finished the season having mostly accumulated brief appearances with the Lens first team, marking a half-season of adaptation, as Franck Haise is known for taking considerable time to integrate players who have never played in Ligue 1.

However, things did not go as planned for Berg, who had been expected to succeed Doucouré following his transfer to Crystal Palace in the summer of 2022. The arrival of Ghanaian midfielder Salis Abdul Samed, newly signed from Clermont to strengthen the midfield, further clouded his future at Lens. Berg therefore began the 2022–2023 season on the bench, continuing to make substitute appearances, but increasingly in the final minutes of matches.

=== Return to Bodø/Glimt ===
On 29 August 2022, after only six months in France, Berg decided to return to Norway and rejoin his boyhood club, Bodø/Glimt. On 3 September 2023, Berg scored twice in a league match against Hamarkameratene. Despite his brace, neither side was able to secure victory, with the match ending in a 4–4 draw.

Berg won the Norwegian league title for a third time as Bodø/Glimt were once again crowned champions at the end of the 2023 season. He played a key role in Bodø/Glimt's historic European campaigns, contributing to the club's run to the semi-finals of the 2024–25 UEFA Europa League, and helping them reach the UEFA Champions League Round of 16 in the 2025–26 campaign.

== International career ==
In August 2020, Berg received his first call-up to the Norway national team for UEFA Nations League matches against Austria and Northern Ireland. However, he remained an unused substitute in both matches. He was called up again in November 2020, but after testing positive for COVID-19 despite being asymptomatic, he was placed in quarantine and was ultimately unable to make his senior international debut during that international break.

On 24 March 2021, Berg made his international debut for the Norway national team in a World Cup qualifier against Gibraltar, making him Norway's first ever third-generation international footballer.

On 21 May 2026, Berg was included in the 26-man squad selected by Norway national team manager Ståle Solbakken for the 2026 FIFA World Cup. He started the tournament on the bench, but soon became the preferred choice as a defensive midfielder. He played 4 out of the team’s 6 games as a starter.

== Personal life ==
Berg comes from a football family; his father Ørjan Berg, his grandfather Harald Berg, his uncles Arild and Runar Berg, and his great uncle Knut Berg have all played for Bodø/Glimt. Harald, Ørjan, and Runar have also played for the national team. Following his appearances in the 2026 FIFA World Cup he has been jokingly called "Patrick Jane" due to his resemblance to actor Simon Baker who played Jane in the show The Mentalist.

== Career statistics ==
=== Club ===
As of match played 20 November 2026

Appearances and goals by club, season and competition
Club	Season	League			National cup (Note: Includes Norwegian Cup, Coupe de France)		Europe		Total	
Club	Season	Division	Apps	Goals	Apps	Goals	Apps	Goals	Apps	Goals
Bodø/Glimt	2014	Eliteserien	1	0	1	0	—		2	0
Bodø/Glimt	2015	Eliteserien	4	0	1	0	—		5	0
Bodø/Glimt	2016	Eliteserien	18	1	4	1	—		22	2
Bodø/Glimt	2017	Norwegian First Division	17	0	2	0	—		19	0
Bodø/Glimt	2018	Eliteserien	19	0	5	2	—		24	2
Bodø/Glimt	2019	Eliteserien	24	0	1	0	—		25	0
Bodø/Glimt	2020	Eliteserien	28	4	0	0	3 (Note: Appearances in UEFA Europa League)	1	31	5
Bodø/Glimt	2021	Eliteserien	26	3	2	1	13 (Note: Two appearances in UEFA Champions League, eleven appearances and three goals in UEFA Europa Conference League)	3	41	7
Bodø/Glimt	Total		137	8	16	4	16	4	169	16
Lens	2021–22	Ligue 1	14	0	2	0	—		16	0
Lens	2022–23	Ligue 1	3	0	0	0	—		3	0
Lens	Total		17	0	2	0	—		19	0
Bodø/Glimt	2022	Eliteserien	10	1	0		7 (Note: Five appearances in UEFA Europa League, two appearances in UEFA Europa Conference League)	0	17	1
Bodø/Glimt	2023	Eliteserien	30	3	9	2	14 (Note: Appearances in UEFA Europa Conference League)	4	53	9
Bodø/Glimt	2024	Eliteserien	29	9	2	0	21 (Note: Six appearances in UEFA Champions League, fifteen appearances and two goals in UEFA Europa League)	2	52	11
Bodø/Glimt	2025	Eliteserien	28	5	3	1	8 (Note: Appearances in UEFA Champions League)	0	39	6
Bodø/Glimt	2026	Eliteserien	25	2	4	0	13	1	42	3
Bodø/Glimt	Total		122	20	18	3	63	7	203	30
Career total			276	28	36	7	79	11	391	46

=== International ===
As of match played 17 November 2026

Appearances and goals by national team and year
National team	Year	Apps	Goals
Norway	2021	9	0
Norway	2022	5	0
Norway	2023	8	0
Norway	2024	8	0
Norway	2025	9	0
Norway	2026	15	0
Total		54	0

== Honours ==
Bodø/Glimt

- Eliteserien: 2020, 2021, 2023, 2024
- Norwegian Cup: 2025–26

Individual

- Eliteserien Player of the Year: 2021, 2025
- UEFA Europa League Team of the Season: 2024–25
- Eliteserien Player of the Month: June/July 2025
