= 2026 Norwegian Football Cup final =

- Event: 2025–26 Norwegian Football Cup
| Bodø/Glimt | Brann |
| 3 | 3 |
- After extra time Bodø/Glimt won 4–2 on penalties
- Date: 9 May 2026
- Venue: Ullevaal Stadion, Oslo
- Referee: Marius Hansen Grøtta
- Attendance: 24,636

The 2026 Norwegian Football Cup final was the final match of the 2025–26 Norwegian Football Cup, the 120th season of the Norwegian Football Cup, the premier Norwegian football cup competition organized by the Football Association of Norway (NFF). The match was played on 9 May 2026 at the Ullevaal Stadion in Oslo, between two Eliteserien sides: Bodø/Glimt and Brann.

== Route to the final ==
Note: In all results below, the score of the finalist is given first.

| Bodø/Glimt | | Round | Brann | |
|---|---|---|---|---|
| Odd (D1); A 3–1 | Riisnæs 48', Helmersen 62', Hauge 90+6' | Third round | Mjøndalen (D1); A 5–1 | Boakye 1', Hansen 16', Dragsnes 45', De Roeve 48', Finne 74' |
| Molde (ES); A 2–1 | Auklend 32', 73' | Fourth round | Tromsdalen (D2); A 3–2 (a.e.t.) | Myhre 22', Þorsteinsson 59', Sørensen 114' |
| Lillestrøm (D1); H 4–0 | Høgh 38', 59', Auklend 48', Evjen 52' | Quarter-final | Sarpsborg 08 (ES); A 2–1 | Sørensen 22', Holm 58' |
| KFUM (ES); H 2–1 (a.e.t.) | Schneider 61' (o.g.), Helmersen 118' | Semi-final | Aalesund (D1); A 2–1 | Haram 10 (o.g.), Mathisen 39' |

Key:

- ES = Eliteserien team
- D1 = 1. divisjon team
- D2 = 2. divisjon team
- D3 = 3. divisjon team
- D4 = 4. divisjon team
- H = Home
- A = Away

== Match ==
=== Details ===
9 May 2026
16:00 CET (UTC+1)

| Bodø/Glimt | 3–3 (a.e.t.) | Brann |
|---|---|---|
| Pedersen 7' (o.g.); Brynhildsen 86'; Helmersen 110' | Report | Myhre 39'; Ingason 40'; Soltvedt 118' (pen.) |
Penalties
| Helmersen (penalty scored); Evjen (penalty scored); Bjørtuft (penalty scored); Sjøvold (penalty scored) | 4–2 | (penalty missed) Soltvedt; (penalty scored) Myhre; (penalty scored) Wassberg; (penalty missed) Haaland |

Ullevaal Stadion, Oslo
Attendance: 24,636
Referee: Marius Hansen Grøtta (Malmefjorden)

| Bodø/Glimt | Brann |

Bodø/Glimt:
| GK | 12 | (Russia) Nikita Haikin |
| RB | 20 | (Norway) Fredrik Sjøvold |
| CB | 4 | (Norway) Odin Bjørtuft |
| CB | 5 | (Norway) Haitam Aleesami | | (substituted off) 105' |
| LB | 15 | (Norway) Fredrik André Bjørkan | | (substituted off) 79' |
| RM | 8 | (Norway) Sondre Auklend | | (substituted off) 63' |
| CM | 7 | (Norway) Patrick Berg (c) | (yellow card) 95' |
| LM | 19 | (Norway) Sondre Brunstad Fet | | (substituted off) 105' |
| RW | 11 | (Norway) Ole Didrik Blomberg | | (substituted off) 79' |
| CF | 9 | (Denmark) Kasper Høgh | | (substituted off) 79' |
| LW | 10 | (Norway) Jens Petter Hauge |
Substitutions:
| GK | 1 | (Norway) Julian Faye Lund |
| DF | 6 | (Norway) Jostein Gundersen | | (substituted on) 105' |
| FW | 17 | (Norway) Ola Brynhildsen | | (substituted on) 79' |
| FW | 21 | (Norway) Andreas Helmersen | | (substituted on) 79' |
| MF | 22 | (Denmark) Anders Klynge |
| MF | 23 | (Norway) Magnus Riisnæs |
| FW | 24 | (Norway) Daniel Bassi | | (substituted on) 105' |
| DF | 25 | (Norway) Isak Dybvik Määttä | | (substituted on) 79' |
| MF | 26 | (Norway) Håkon Evjen | | (substituted on) 63' |
Head coach:
(Norway) Kjetil Knutsen

Brann:
| GK | 12 | (Norway) Simen Vidtun Nilsen |
| RB | 21 | (Belgium) Denzel De Roeve | | (substituted off) 91' |
| CB | 3 | (Norway) Fredrik Pallesen Knudsen (c) |
| CB | 23 | (Norway) Thore Pedersen | | (substituted off) 73' |
| LB | 17 | (Norway) Joachim Soltvedt |
| RM | 10 | (Iceland) Kristall Máni Ingason | | (substituted off) 73' |
| CM | 18 | (Denmark) Jacob Lungi Sørensen | (yellow card) 31' |
| LM | 8 | (Norway) Felix Horn Myhre |
| RW | 14 | (Norway) Ulrik Mathisen | | (substituted off) 66' |
| CF | 16 | (Norway) Kristian Eriksen | | (substituted off) 99' |
| LW | 7 | (Iceland) Jón Dagur Þorsteinsson | | (substituted off) 66' |
Substitutions:
| GK | 36 | (Norway) Håkon Melås Hellesøy |
| FW | 11 | (Norway) Bård Finne | | (substituted on) 99' |
| DF | 15 | (Norway) Jonas Torsvik | | (substituted on) 91' |
| DF | 20 | (Norway) Vetle Dragsnes | | (substituted on) 73' |
| MF | 25 | (Norway) Niklas Jensen Wassberg | (yellow card) 120+3' | (substituted on) 73' |
| FW | 26 | (Wales) Rabbi Matondo |
| FW | 29 | (Norway) Noah Holm | | (substituted on) 66' |
| MF | 32 | (Norway) Markus Haaland | | (substituted on) 66' |
| DF | 43 | (Norway) Rasmus Holten |
Head coach:
| (Iceland) Freyr Alexandersson | | | | (yellow card) 120+1' |

MATCH OFFICIALS

- Assistant referees:
  - Erland Hareland (Lesja IL)
  - Jim Andre Alnes Dyb (IL Valder)
- Fourth official: Christian Moen (Løvenstad FK)
- Video assistant referee: Marius Lien (Fossum IF)
- Assistant video assistant referee: Mischa Huru Kellerhals (Orre IL)

MATCH RULES

- 90 minutes.
- 30 minutes of extra-time if necessary.
- Penalty shoot-out if scores still level.
- Nine named substitutes.
- Maximum of five substitutions.
