= Andreas Helmersen =

Norwegian footballer (born 1998)

Personal information
- Full name: Andreas Klausen Helmersen
- Date of birth: 15 March 1998 (age 28)
- Place of birth: Trondheim, Norway
- Height: 1.90 m (6 ft 3 in)
- Position: Forward

Team information
- Current team: Bodø/Glimt
- Number: 9

Youth career
- –2012: Freidig
- 2013–2015: Rosenborg

Senior career*
Years	Team	Apps	(Gls)
2015–2020	Rosenborg	1	(0)
2018	→ Ranheim (loan)	23	(3)
2019	→ Odd (loan)	0	(0)
2021–2023	Raufoss	56	(13)
2022	→ Hødd (loan)	11	(4)
2024	Egersund	14	(13)
2024–	Bodø/Glimt	56	(23)

International career^{‡}
2014	Norway U16	16	(4)
2015	Norway U17	6	(1)
2016	Norway U18	1	(0)
2018	Norway U21	2	(0)
- * Club domestic league appearances and goals as of 20 November 2026 ‡ National team caps and goals as of 14:06, 19 April 2019 (UTC)

Andreas Klausen Helmersen (born 15 March 1998) is a Norwegian professional footballer who plays as a forward for Bodø/Glimt.

== Career ==
=== Rosenborg ===
After impressing during preseason Andreas Helmersen was promoted to the first team ahead of the 2015 Tippeligaen season.

Andreas Helmersen made his debut for Rosenborg starting in a 3–0 win in a cup game against Vuku in April 2015. On July 2 the same year he made his European debut coming on in a 2–0 win in the first qualifying round of the 2015–16 UEFA Europa League over Víkingur of the Faroe Islands.

In November 2015 Helmersen, alongside teammates John Hou Sæter and Sivert Solli, became the first players in Norwegian football history to having won the Under-16, Under-19 and the senior Norwegian Football Cup. Helmersen and Sæter having also won the Under-16 cup twice. Helmersen won the Under-16 Cup in 2013 and 2014 and then the Under-19 and the senior cup in 2015. Helmersen scored in both the Under-16 finals.

In February 2018, Helmersen signed a new three-year contract with Rosenborg. A few days later he went out on loan to Ranheim. Originally, he was set to return to Rosenborg in the summer, but the loan was extended to last the rest of the season.

At the start of the 2019 season, Helmersen was again loaned out, this time to Odd. Under a month after joining Odd, in a pre-season match against CSKA Moscow, Helmersen was injured. The injury would keep him away the rest of the season, and he would not play an official game for Odd.

=== Raufoss ===
After not playing football for almost two years from several injuries, Helmersen signed with 1. divisjon club Raufoss on a three-year contract.

The second half of the 2022 season, Helmersen spent on loan at 2. divisjon side Hødd.

=== Egersund ===
In January 2024 Helmersen signed for fellow 1. divisjon side Egersund on a two-year long contract.

=== Bodø/Glimt ===
After only six months at Egersund, on 17 July 2024, he joined Bodø/Glimt. His first game for the club came only two days later, in a win against Odd.

Coming on as a substitute, Helmersen scored for Bodø/Glimt as they eliminated Lazio at the Stadio Olimpico in the 2024/2025 Europa League. He also scored away at Galatasaray in the 2025/2026 Champions League.

As of mid-September 2026, Helmersen had scored 28 goals for Bodø/Glimt in all competitions, most of them as a substitute for Kasper Høgh, with an average of approximately one goal for every 90 minutes of registered play. After the departure of Høgh to Celtic in 2026, Helmersen became the first choice as an attacker at Bodø/Glimt. In September 2026, he was named by Ståle Solbakken as being in consideration for the Norwegian national team.

== Career statistics ==
As of match played 20 November 2026

Appearances and goals by club, season and competition
Club	Season	League			Norwegian Cup		Europe		Total	
Club	Season	Division	Apps	Goals	Apps	Goals	Apps	Goals	Apps	Goals
Rosenborg	2015	Eliteserien	0	0	3	0	3 (Note: Appearances in UEFA Europa League)	0	6	0
Rosenborg	2016	Eliteserien	0	0	1	0	0	0	1	0
Rosenborg	2017	Eliteserien	1	0	0	0	0	0	1	0
Rosenborg	2020	Eliteserien	0	0	—		0	0	0	0
Rosenborg	Total		1	0	4	0	3	0	8	0
Ranheim (loan)	2018	Eliteserien	23	3	2	1	—		25	4
Odd (loan)	2019	Eliteserien	0	0	0	0	—		0	0
Raufoss	2021	Norwegian First Division	28	6	2	2	—		30	8
Raufoss	2022	Norwegian First Division	0	0	0	0	—		0	0
Raufoss	2023	Norwegian First Division	28	7	4	1	—		32	8
Raufoss	Total		56	13	6	3	—		62	16
Hødd (loan)	2022	Norwegian Second Division	11	4	0	0	—		11	4
Egersund	2024	Norwegian First Division	14	13	2	1	—		16	14
Bodø/Glimt	2024	Eliteserien	11	3	0	0	15 (Note: Three appearances in UEFA Champions League, twelve appearances and one goal in UEFA Europa League)	1	26	4
Bodø/Glimt	2025	Eliteserien	21	6	2	2	7 (Note: Appearances in UEFA Champions League)	1	30	9
Bodø/Glimt	2026	Eliteserien	24	14	4	2	14	3	42	19
Bodø/Glimt	Total		56	23	6	4	36	5	98	32
Career total			161	56	20	9	39	5	220	70

== Honours ==
Rosenborg

- Eliteserien: 2017
- Norwegian Cup: 2015, 2016

Bodø/Glimt

- Eliteserien: 2024
- Norwegian Cup: 2025–26

Rosenborg U16

- Norwegian U-16 Championship: 2013, 2014

Rosenborg U19

- Norwegian U-19 Championship: 2015

Individual

- Norwegian First Division Player of the Month: May 2024
- Norwegian Cup Top scorer: 2025–26 Norwegian Cup
