= Mikkel Bro Hansen =

Danish footballer (born 2009)

Personal information
- Date of birth: 25 January 2009 (age 17)
- Place of birth: Lystrup, Denmark
- Height: 1.78 m (5 ft 10 in)
- Position: Striker

Team information
- Current team: PSV
- Number: 23

Youth career
- Lystrup IF
- Midtjylland
- 2021–2025: AGF

Senior career*
Years	Team	Apps	(Gls)
2025–2026	Bodø/Glimt	11	(2)
2026–	Jong PSV	2	(0)
2026–	PSV	2	(0)

International career^{‡}
2024–2025	Denmark U16	8	(3)
2025–	Denmark U17	16	(13)
- * Club domestic league appearances and goals as of 25 October 2026 ‡ National team caps and goals as of 1 June 2026

Mikkel Bro Hansen (born 25 January 2009) is a Danish professional footballer who plays as a striker for Eredivisie club PSV.

== Club career ==
A youth product of Lystrup IF and Midtjylland, Bro Hansen joined AGF's youth academy in 2021 and worked his way up their categories - he started playing with their U19s as a 14-year-old. On 25 January 2025, he joined the Norwegian club Bodø/Glimt on a contract until 2027. He made his senior debut with them in a 8–0 Norwegian Football Cup win over Innstrandens IL, scoring a hattrick in the first half. He made his league debut with Bodø/Glimt in a 3–0 Eliteserien win over Hamarkameratene on 5 April 2025.

On 3 September 2026, Bro Hansen signed a three-year contract with Eredivisie club PSV. On 13 October 2026, he made his first appearance for PSV in a Champions League game against RB Leipzig.

== Career statistics ==
As of match played 25 October 2026

Appearances and goals by club, season and competition
Club	Season	League			National cup (Note: Includes Norwegian Cup)		Europe		Total	
Club	Season	Division	Apps	Goals	Apps	Goals	Apps	Goals	Apps	Goals
Bodø/Glimt	2025	Eliteserien	5	1	3	6	1 (Note: Appearances in UEFA Champions League)	0	9	7
Bodø/Glimt	2026	Eliteserien	6	1	0	0	0	0	6	1
Bodø/Glimt	Total		11	2	3	6	1	0	15	8
Jong PSV	2026–27	Eerste Divisie	2	0	—		—		2	0
PSV	2026–27	Eredivisie	2	0	0	0	1	0	3	0
Career total			15	2	3	6	2	0	20	8

== International career ==
Bro Hansen is a youth international for Denmark, having first played for the Denmark U16 in April 2024.
