= Andreas Evjen =

Norwegian footballer (born 1969)

Personal information
- Date of birth: 25 May 1969 (age 57)
- Position: Defender

Youth career
- Mjølner

Senior career*
Years	Team	Apps	(Gls)
1987–1992	Mjølner		
1993–2000	Bodø/Glimt	150	(0)
2001	Start	19	(0)
2002–2003	Mjølner		

Managerial career
- Mjølner (youth)
- * Club domestic league appearances and goals

Andreas Evjen (born 25 May 1969) is a Norwegian former footballer who played as a defender.

He spent his career in Mjølner, Bodø/Glimt and Start, amassing 150 Eliteserien games for Bodø/Glimt.

He is the brother of footballer Thomas Evjen and father of Henrik and Håkon Evjen (twins), whom he also coached. He has also sat on Mjølner's sports committee.
