= Sondre Brunstad Fet =

Norwegian footballer (born 1997)

Personal information
- Date of birth: 17 January 1997 (age 29)
- Place of birth: Ålesund, Norway
- Height: 1.78 m (5 ft 10 in)
- Position: Midfielder

Team information
- Current team: Bodø/Glimt
- Number: 19

Youth career
- –2011: Sykkylven
- 2013–2015: Aalesund

Senior career*
Years	Team	Apps	(Gls)
2012	Sykkylven	12	(3)
2014–2020	Aalesund	92	(8)
2020	→ Bodø/Glimt (loan)	26	(5)
2021–	Bodø/Glimt	113	(13)

International career
2015	Norway U18	5	(0)
- * Club domestic league appearances and goals as of 20 November 2026

Sondre Brunstad Fet (born 17 January 1997) is a Norwegian professional footballer who plays as a midfielder for Eliteserien side Bodø/Glimt.

== Club career ==
=== Aalesund ===
Brunstad Fet started his career in Sykkylven, representing the senior team. In 2013, he joined the regional great team Aalesund, and made his league debut as a 90th-minute substitute in August 2014 against Haugesund, and made on successful pass out of one attempt.

=== Bodø/Glimt ===
On 29 May 2020, Brunstad Fet joined Eliteserien side Bodø/Glimt, on a season-long loan. On 27 October 2020, he signed contract to 2023 for Bodø/Glimt.

== International career ==
He has represented Norway as a youth international for their U18 team.

== Career statistics ==
=== Club ===
As of match played 20 November 2026

Appearances and goals by club, season and competition
Club	Season	League			Norwegian Cup		Europe		Other		Total	
Club	Season	Division	Apps	Goals	Apps	Goals	Apps	Goals	Apps	Goals	Apps	Goals
Sykkylven	2012	Norwegian Fourth Division	12	3	0	0	—		—		12	3
Aalesund	2014	Tippeligaen	1	0	1	0	—		—		2	0
Aalesund	2015	Tippeligaen	3	0	0	0	—		—		3	0
Aalesund	2016	Tippeligaen	16	2	3	1	—		—		19	3
Aalesund	2017	Eliteserien	26	0	3	1	—		—		29	1
Aalesund	2018	Norwegian First Division	28	4	1	0	—		4 (Note: Appearances in Eliteserien play-offs)	0	33	4
Aalesund	2019	Norwegian First Division	18	2	4	1	—		—		22	3
Aalesund	Total		92	8	12	3	—		4	0	108	11
Bodø/Glimt (loan)	2020	Eliteserien	26	5	—		3 (Note: Appearances in UEFA Europa League)	0	—		29	5
Bodø/Glimt	2021	Eliteserien	26	3	1	0	13 (Note: Two appearances in UEFA Champions League, eleven appearances and one goal in UEFA Europa Conference League)	1	—		40	4
Bodø/Glimt	2022	Eliteserien	1	0	1	0	0	0	—		2	0
Bodø/Glimt	2023	Eliteserien	21	0	5	0	12 (Note: Appearance in UEFA Europa Conference League)	1	—		38	1
Bodø/Glimt	2024	Eliteserien	16	2	0	0	20 (Note: Six appearances and two goals in UEFA Champions League, fourteen appearances and one goal in UEFA Europa League)	3	—		36	5
Bodø/Glimt	2025	Eliteserien	23	4	3	0	6 (Note: Six appearances and two goals in UEFA Champions League)	2	—		32	5
Bodø/Glimt	2026	Eliteserien	26	4	4	1	14 (Note: Fourteen appearances and four goal in UEFA Champions League)	4	—		44	9
Bodø/Glimt	Total		139	18	14	1	68	11	—		221	30
Career total			243	29	26	4	68	11	4	0	341	44

== Honours ==
Aalesund

- Norwegian First Division: 2019

Bodø/Glimt

- Eliteserien: 2020, 2021, 2023, 2024
- Norwegian Football Cup runner-up: 2021-22, 2023
- Norwegian Football Cup: 2025–26
