= Kasper Høgh =

Danish footballer (born 2000)

Personal information
- Full name: Kasper Waarts Thenza Høgh
- Date of birth: 6 December 2000 (age 25)
- Place of birth: Randers, Denmark
- Height: 1.86 m (6 ft 1 in)
- Position: Striker

Team information
- Current team: Celtic
- Number: 9

Youth career
- 2005–2014: Vorup
- 2014–2018: Randers

Senior career*
Years	Team	Apps	(Gls)
2018–2021	Randers	16	(0)
2020	→ Valur (loan)	5	(0)
2021–2022	Hobro	12	(4)
2022–2023	AaB	20	(3)
2023	→ Stabæk (loan)	14	(5)
2023	Stabæk	0	(0)
2024–2026	Bodø/Glimt	63	(36)
2026–	Celtic	10	(3)

International career^{‡}
2017	Denmark U18	2	(2)
2018–2019	Denmark U19	8	(1)
2026–	Denmark	8	(1)
- * Club domestic league appearances and goals as of 17:41, 8 November 2026 (UTC) ‡ National team caps and goals as of 5 October 2026

Kasper Waarts Thenza Høgh (born 6 December 2000) is a Danish professional footballer who plays as a striker for Scottish Premiership club Celtic and the Denmark national team.

== Early life and career ==
Høgh grew up in Vorup, a suburb of Randers, Central Denmark Region, and began playing football with local club Vorup at the age of four. He also played handball in his youth, following his parents, Ulla Waarst Sørensen and Peter Høgh, both former divisional handball players, before deciding to focus on football at the age of 12.

After progressing from Vorup, he joined the Randers youth system in January 2014, where he developed into a prolific goalscorer. During one under-19 league season, he scored 23 goals in 19 matches, finishing as the division's top scorer despite being young for the age group.

== Club career ==
=== Randers ===
In December 2017, Høgh signed a new contract with Randers, keeping him at the club until 2020. He was first included in the senior matchday squad on 4 April 2018 for a Danish Cup match against Silkeborg. Eleven days later, he made his first-team debut, replacing Mikael Boman in the 80th minute of a 3–0 away defeat to OB in the Danish Superliga.

Having established himself as the club's top scorer at under-19 level, Høgh signed a five-year contract with Randers on 19 March 2019 and was scheduled to be promoted permanently to the first-team squad from the start of the 2019–20 season. He subsequently featured only intermittently for the senior side, making 17 first-team appearances and scoring once before being loaned out in July 2020.

On 29 July 2020, Høgh joined Icelandic club Valur on loan for the remainder of the calendar year. Randers stated that, having recently returned from injury, he needed regular playing time as part of his development. The move was later described by Randers as having been disrupted by injuries.

Høgh left Randers permanently on 18 June 2021, when he was sold to Danish 1st Division club Hobro. Randers described him as a talented goalscorer who needed consistent playing time to continue his development, and stated that the club had secured a buy-back option as part of the transfer. He left having made 22 first-team appearances and scored one goal for the club.

=== Hobro ===
On 18 June 2021, Høgh joined Danish 1st Division club Hobro on a three-year contract after leaving Randers, who retained a buy-back clause as part of the transfer. His start to the season was disrupted by injury, which kept him out of Hobro's opening fixtures.

He went on to score four goals in twelve appearances for the club, including goals against Hvidovre and Nykøbing.

=== AaB ===
On 14 January 2022, it was reported that Høgh had gone to Malta for a training camp with AaB. Later in the same month, on 21 January, Høgh's transfer to the Danish Superliga club AaB was confirmed, signing a deal until June 2026. Høgh got his debut for AaB on 20 February 2022 against Midtjylland, scoring the second goal in a 2–0 win.

=== Stabæk ===
On 18 January 2023, Høgh joined newly promoted Norwegian Eliteserien side Stabæk on a year-long loan deal with a purchase option. On 2 July 2023, after scoring eight goals in 14 games, Stabæk confirmed that the club had exercised the purchase option on Høgh with immediate effect, with Høgh signing a deal until the end of 2025.

=== Bodø/Glimt ===
On 2 October 2023, it was confirmed that Høgh had signed a pre-contract with Bodø/Glimt, which would take effect from January 2024. In the 2024 season, he finished as the club's top scorer with 12 goals as they retained their Eliteserien title. He also impressed in the 2024–25 UEFA Europa League as his club reached the semi-finals, scoring seven goals to share the competition's top scorer award with Bruno Fernandes and Ayoub El Kaabi.

In the 2025 season, he retained his club's top-scorer status with 17 goals, as Bodø/Glimt finished second in the league, one point behind Viking. On 20 January 2026, he scored his first UEFA Champions League goals by netting a brace in a 3–1 victory over Manchester City. A week later, on 28 January, he netted a goal in a 2–1 away win over Atlético Madrid, securing his club's spot in the Champions League knockout play-offs.

=== Celtic ===
On 28 July 2026, it was confirmed that Høgh had signed a contract to join Scottish Premiership Champions Celtic. He was part of the starting squad for Celtic's opening fixture against Dundee on 3 August. Høgh scored his first goals for the club on 9 August, netting a first half hat-trick away to Kilmarnock in a 5–1 win.

== International career ==
On 17 March 2026, Høgh received his first call-up to the senior Denmark squad from head coach Brian Riemer for the 2026 FIFA World Cup qualification play-off against North Macedonia. He made his senior debut in the 4–0 victory over North Macedonia nine days later, coming on for Rasmus Højlund in the 81st minute. On 31 March, Høgh made his second appearance in the play-off final against the Czech Republic in Prague. Introduced as a substitute for Morten Hjulmand in the 105th minute with Denmark trailing 2–1 in extra time, he headed in a corner delivered by Anders Dreyer in the 111th minute to equalise and force a penalty shoot-out—his first goal for the senior national team. Denmark were defeated 3–1 in the shoot-out, eliminating them from World Cup qualification.

== Career statistics ==
=== Club ===
As of match played 8 November 2026

Appearances and goals by club, season and competition
Club	Season	League			National cup (Note: Includes Danish Cup, Norwegian Cup)		League cup (Note: Includes Scottish League Cup)		Europe		Total	
Club	Season	Division	Apps	Goals	Apps	Goals	Apps	Goals	Apps	Goals	Apps	Goals
Randers	2017–18	Danish Superliga	2	0	0	0	—		—		2	0
Randers	2018–19	Danish Superliga	2	0	1	0	—		—		3	0
Randers	2019–20	Danish Superliga	8	0	4	1	—		—		12	1
Randers	2020–21	Danish Superliga	4	0	1	0	—		—		5	0
Randers	Total		16	0	6	1	—		—		22	1
Valur (loan)	2020	Besta deild karla	5	0	0	0	—		—		5	0
Hobro	2021–22	Danish 1st Division	12	4	0	0	—		—		12	4
AaB	2021–22	Danish Superliga	16	3	0	0	—		—		16	3
AaB	2022–23	Danish Superliga	4	0	1	0	—		—		5	0
AaB	Total		20	3	1	0	—		—		21	3
Stabæk	2023	Eliteserien	14	5	3	3	—		—		17	8
Bodø/Glimt	2024	Eliteserien	23	12	1	0	—		19 (Note: Five appearances and two goals in UEFA Champions League, fourteen appearances and seven goals in UEFA Europa League)	9	43	21
Bodø/Glimt	2025	Eliteserien	28	17	2	1	—		8 (Note: Appearances in UEFA Champions League)	1	38	19
Bodø/Glimt	2026	Eliteserien	12	7	4	2	—		6	5	22	14
Bodø/Glimt	Total		63	36	7	3	—		33	15	103	54
Celtic	2026–27	Scottish Premiership	10	3	0	0	2	0	6 (Note: Two appearances in UEFA Champions League, four appearances in UEFA Europa League)	0	18	3
Career total			140	51	17	7	2	0	39	15	198	73

=== International ===
As of match played 4 October 2026

Appearances and goals by national team and year
National team	Year	Apps	Goals
Denmark	2026	8	1
Total		8	1

Scores and results list Denmark's goal tally first, score column indicates score after each Høgh goal.

List of international goals scored by Kasper Høgh
No.	Date	Venue	Cap	Opponent	Score	Result	Competition
1	31 March 2026	Stadion Letná, Prague, Czech Republic	2	Czech Republic	2–2	2–2 (a.e.t.) (1–3 p)	2026 FIFA World Cup qualification

== Honours ==
Randers

- Danish Cup: 2020–21

Bodø/Glimt

- Eliteserien: 2024
- Norwegian Football Cup: 2025–26

Individual

- UEFA Europa League top scorer: 2024–25 (joint)
