= Nikita Haikin =

Russian footballer (born 1995)

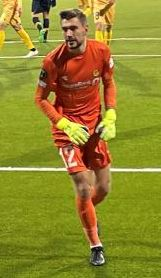
- Haikin in 2021

Personal information
- Full name: Nikita Ilyich Haikin
- Date of birth: 11 July 1995 (age 31)
- Place of birth: Netanya, Israel
- Height: 1.89 m (6 ft 2 in)
- Position: Goalkeeper

Team information
- Current team: Bodø/Glimt
- Number: 12

Youth career
- 2002–2008: FShM Moscow
- 2009: Dynamo Moscow
- 2009–2010: Chelsea
- 2010–2012: Portsmouth
- 2012–2013: Reading

Senior career*
Years	Team	Apps	(Gls)
2013–2014	Nacional	0	(0)
2014–2015	Marbella	0	(0)
2015	Rostov	0	(0)
2015–2016	Kuban Krasnodar	0	(0)
2016–2017	Bnei Yehuda	2	(0)
2017–2018	Hapoel Kfar Saba	13	(0)
2019–2022	Bodø/Glimt	77	(0)
2023	Bristol City	0	(0)
2023–	Bodø/Glimt	112	(0)

International career^{‡}
2010	Russia U16	1	(0)
2012	Russia U17	1	(0)
2013	Russia U18	1	(0)
2015–2016	Russia U21	2	(0)
- * Club domestic league appearances and goals as of 20 November 2026 ‡ National team caps and goals as of 2 November 2017

Nikita Ilyich Haikin (Russian: Никита Ильич Хайкин, Hebrew: ניקיטה איליץ' חייקין; born 11 July 1995) is a professional footballer who plays as a goalkeeper for Eliteserien club Bodø/Glimt. Born in Israel, he has represented Russia at youth level.

== Early life ==
Haikin was born in Netanya, Israel, to a family who emigrated from Russia to Israel. His father Ilya is a businessman. In 1997, as a two-year-old baby, his family moved back with him to Moscow, Russia.

== Club career ==
Aged seven, Haikin began his youth career at FSHM Torpedo-Moscow. Nikita was also a part of Dinamo Moscow academy before moving to England.

In September 2013, Haikin went on trial with Reading following his release from Chelsea. Haikin made his professional debut in the Israeli Premier League for Bnei Yehuda Tel Aviv on 25 February 2017 in a game against Maccabi Tel Aviv.

He then ran out of the contract and joined Hapoel Kfar Saba for one season.

In March 2019 he signed a contract with Eliteserien club Bodø/Glimt with whom Nikita became a silver medalist in his first season and won, in two consecutive seasons, the Norwegian League championship in 2020 and 2021. Haikin played in the UEFA Europa League where Bodø/Glimt played the likes of Milan at San Siro, AS Roma at the Stadio Olimpico, and Celtic F.C. at Celtic Park.

On 25 January 2023, after being released by Bodø/Glimt, Haikin signed a short-term contract with English Championship club Bristol City until the end of the season. Haikin was released by Bristol City on 21 March 2023, re-signing with Bodø/Glimt the same day, on a contract until the summer of 2026.

On 17 April 2025, during the second leg of Bodø/Glimt's UEFA Europa League tie against Lazio, Haikin saved two penalty kicks, helping the team become the first Norwegian club to reach the semi-finals of a European competition. During the 2025–26 UEFA Champions League, Haikin played a key role in helping his club reach the round of 16. He made a total of 68 saves, surpassing the previous competition record set by Thibaut Courtois in 2021–22.

== International career ==
Originally eligible to represent Israel, England, and Russia, Haikin has been an international youth for Russia since 2010.

He was called up to the Russia senior national team for the first time in October 2021, as part of their World Cup qualifiers against Cyprus and Croatia. He was included in the extended 41-players list of candidates. He was included in the final squad list for these games and was on the bench in both, backing up Matvei Safonov.

On 31 October 2024, Haikin revealed his intentions to apply for Norwegian citizenship due to his engagement to a Norwegian and desire to settle down there. Norway manager Ståle Solbakken commented that Haikin would be considered for a call-up should he become eligible. On 10 April 2026, Haikin was granted Norwegian citizenship, making him eligible to represent Norway at international level. A month later, on 8 May, reports emerged that FIFA had rejected or delayed Haikin's request to switch his sporting nationality from Russia to Norway due to residency rule requirements, leaving him ineligible for Norway selection ahead of the 2026 FIFA World Cup.

== Career statistics ==
As of match played 20 November 2026

Appearances and goals by club, season and competition
Club	Season	League			National cup (Note: Includes Israel State Cup, Norwegian Football Cup)		Continental		Total	
Club	Season	Division	Apps	Goals	Apps	Goals	Apps	Goals	Apps	Goals
Mordovia Saransk	2014–15	Russian Premier League	0	0	0	0	–		0	0
Kuban Krasnodar	2015–16	Russian Premier League	0	0	0	0	–		0	0
Kuban Krasnodar	2016–17	Russian Football National League	0	0	0	0	–		0	0
Kuban Krasnodar	Total		0	0	0	0	0	0	0	0
Bnei Yehuda Tel Aviv	2016–17	Israeli Premier League	2	0	3	0	–		5	0
Hapoel Kfar Saba	2017–18	Liga Leumit	13	0	2	0	–		15	0
Bodø/Glimt	2019	Eliteserien	1	0	2	0	–		3	0
Bodø/Glimt	2020	Eliteserien	20	0	0	0	3 (Note: Appearances in UEFA Europa League)	0	23	0
Bodø/Glimt	2021	Eliteserien	29	0	1	0	19 (Note: Two appearances in UEFA Champions League, seventeen appearances in UEFA Europa Conference League)	0	49	0
Bodø/Glimt	2022	Eliteserien	27	0	5	0	14 (Note: Eight appearances in UEFA Champions League, six appearances in UEFA Europa League)	0	45	0
Bodø/Glimt	Total		77	0	8	0	36	0	121	0
Bristol City	2022–23	Championship	0	0	0	0	–		0	0
Bodø/Glimt	2023	Eliteserien	27	0	4	0	10 (Note: Appearances in UEFA Europa Conference League)	0	41	0
Bodø/Glimt	2024	Eliteserien	30	0	0	0	21 (Note: Five appearances in UEFA Champions League, sixteen appearances in UEFA Europa League)	0	51	0
Bodø/Glimt	2025	Eliteserien	30	0	1	0	8 (Note: Appearances in UEFA Champions League)	0	39	0
Bodø/Glimt	2026	Eliteserien	25	0	4	0	14	0	43	0
Bodø/Glimt	Total		112	0	9	0	53	0	174	0
Career total			204	0	22	0	89	0	315	0

== Honours ==
Bnei Yehuda Tel Aviv

- Israel State Cup: 2016–17

Bodø/Glimt

- Eliteserien: 2020, 2021, 2023, 2024
- Norwegian Football Cup: 2025–26

Individual

- Eliteserien Best Goalkepper: 2025

== Personal life ==
=== Citizenships ===
Haikin has quadruple citizenship, having Israeli citizenship by birthright, Russian citizenship through his parents, British passport, and obtained Norwegian citizenship by naturalisation in 2026 after having lived in Norway since March 2019.

=== Views ===
Haikin describes himself as being "European-minded" and is a supporter of freedom of speech and liberal democracy, while being an opponent of all forms of discrimination.

Following the Russian invasion of Ukraine in 2022, Haikin spoke out in favour of peace and became an outspoken critic of Russian President Vladimir Putin. He strongly supports giving humanitarian aid to Ukraine. While warming up for Bodø/Glimt's UEFA Europa League knockout tie against AZ Alkmaar, Haikin wore a yellow shirt that featured the lyric "Imagine all the people livin' in peace" from John Lennon's 1971 song "Imagine" on the back, which was photographed and pinned to his social media profiles. His outspoken anti-Putinist views have made it unlikely that he will ever be called up for the Russia national team, part of why he committed to play for the Norway national team after acquiring Norwegian citizenship.
