= Sondre Auklend =

Norwegian footballer (born 2003)

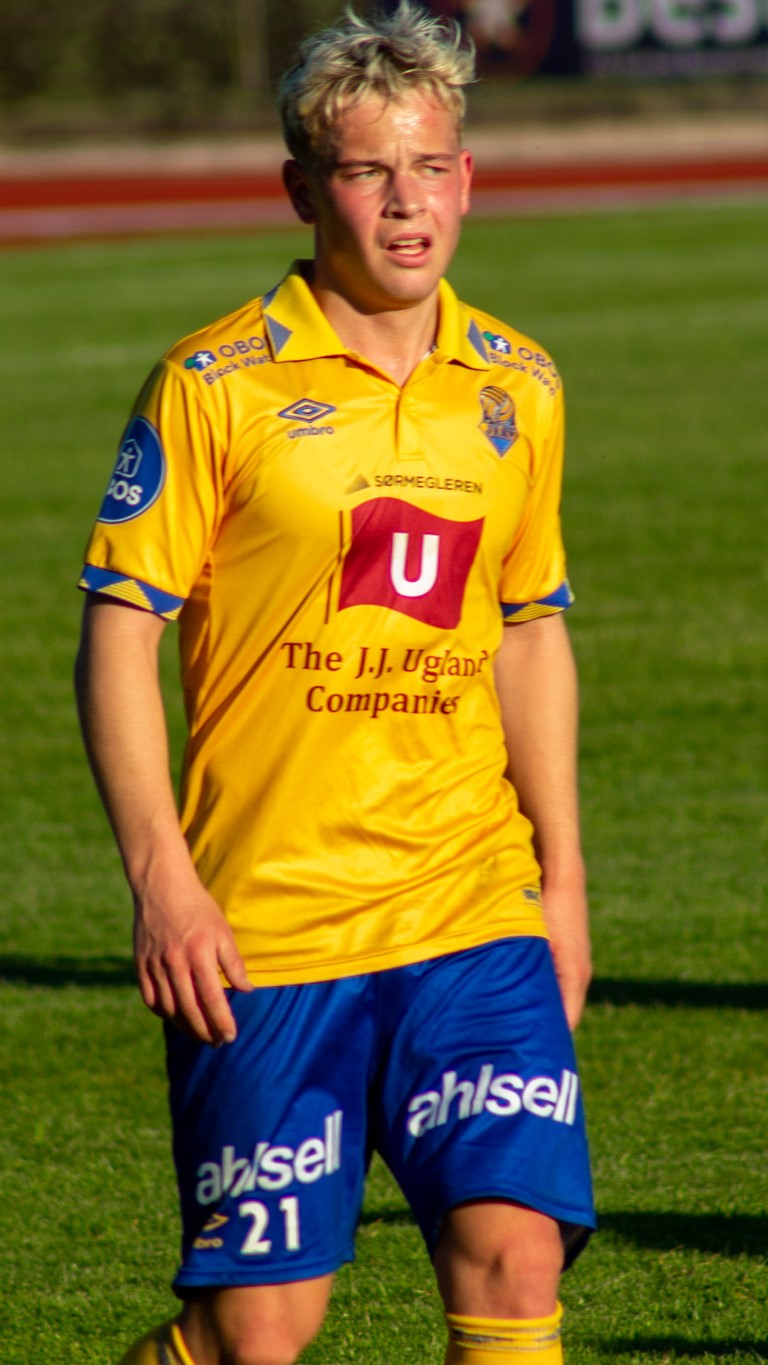
- Auklend in 2023

Personal information
- Date of birth: 10 June 2003 (age 23)
- Place of birth: Stavanger, Norway
- Height: 1.72 m (5 ft 8 in)
- Position: Midfielder

Team information
- Current team: Bodø/Glimt
- Number: 8

Youth career
- Vidar
- –2020: Viking

Senior career*
Years	Team	Apps	(Gls)
2020–2024	Viking	47	(3)
2021	→ Åsane (loan)	16	(1)
2023	→ Jerv (loan)	13	(1)
2024–	Bodø/Glimt	54	(2)

International career
2018	Norway U15	5	(0)
2019	Norway U16	12	(0)
2020	Norway U17	3	(1)
2021	Norway U18	4	(1)
2022	Norway U19	1	(0)
- * Club domestic league appearances and goals as of 20 November 2026

Sondre Auklend (born 10 June 2003) is a Norwegian professional footballer who plays as a midfielder for Bodø/Glimt.

== Career ==
Auklend played youth football at Vidar, before moving to Viking at the age of 11. On 1 August 2018, he signed his first contract with Viking. On 15 May 2020, he was promoted to the first-team squad and signed a new three-year contract with the club. He made his Eliteserien debut on 16 June 2020 in a 4–2 loss against Bodø/Glimt. On 9 August 2021, he joined First Division side Åsane on loan until the end of the season. On 8 December 2021, he signed a contract extension with Viking until the end of 2024. He missed most of the 2022 season due to injury. In May 2023, he joined First Division club Jerv on loan. He was recalled in August 2023.

On 2 July 2024, he signed a contract with Bodø/Glimt effective from 1 January 2025. On 10 August 2024, Viking and Bodø/Glimt agreed on a transfer and Auklend joined Bodø/Glimt on a four-year contract.

== Personal life ==
His brother Vetle Auklend is also a footballer.

== Career statistics ==
As of match played 20 November 2026

Appearances and goals by club, season and competition
Club	Season	League			Norwegian Cup		Europe		Total	
Club	Season	Division	Apps	Goals	Apps	Goals	Apps	Goals	Apps	Goals
Viking	2020	Eliteserien	16	0	—		0	0	16	0
Viking	2021	Eliteserien	9	0	4	0	—		13	0
Viking	2022	Eliteserien	1	0	0	0	0	0	1	0
Viking	2023	Eliteserien	10	1	0	0	—		10	1
Viking	2024	Eliteserien	11	2	4	0	—		15	2
Viking	Total		47	3	8	0	0	0	55	3
Åsane (loan)	2021	1. divisjon	16	1	1	1	—		17	2
Jerv (loan)	2023	1. divisjon	13	1	3	1	—		16	2
Bodø/Glimt	2024	Eliteserien	6	0	0	0	10 (Note: Two appearances in UEFA Champions League, eight appearances in UEFA Europa League)	0	16	0
Bodø/Glimt	2025	Eliteserien	22	1	4	0	7 (Note: Appearances in UEFA Champions League)	0	33	1
Bodø/Glimt	2026	Eliteserien	26	1	5	3	13	1	44	5
Bodø/Glimt	Total		54	2	9	3	30	1	93	6
Career total			130	7	21	5	30	1	181	13

== Honours ==
Bodø/Glimt

- Eliteserien: 2024
- Norwegian Football Cup: 2025–26
