= Fredrik André Bjørkan =

Norwegian footballer (born 1998)

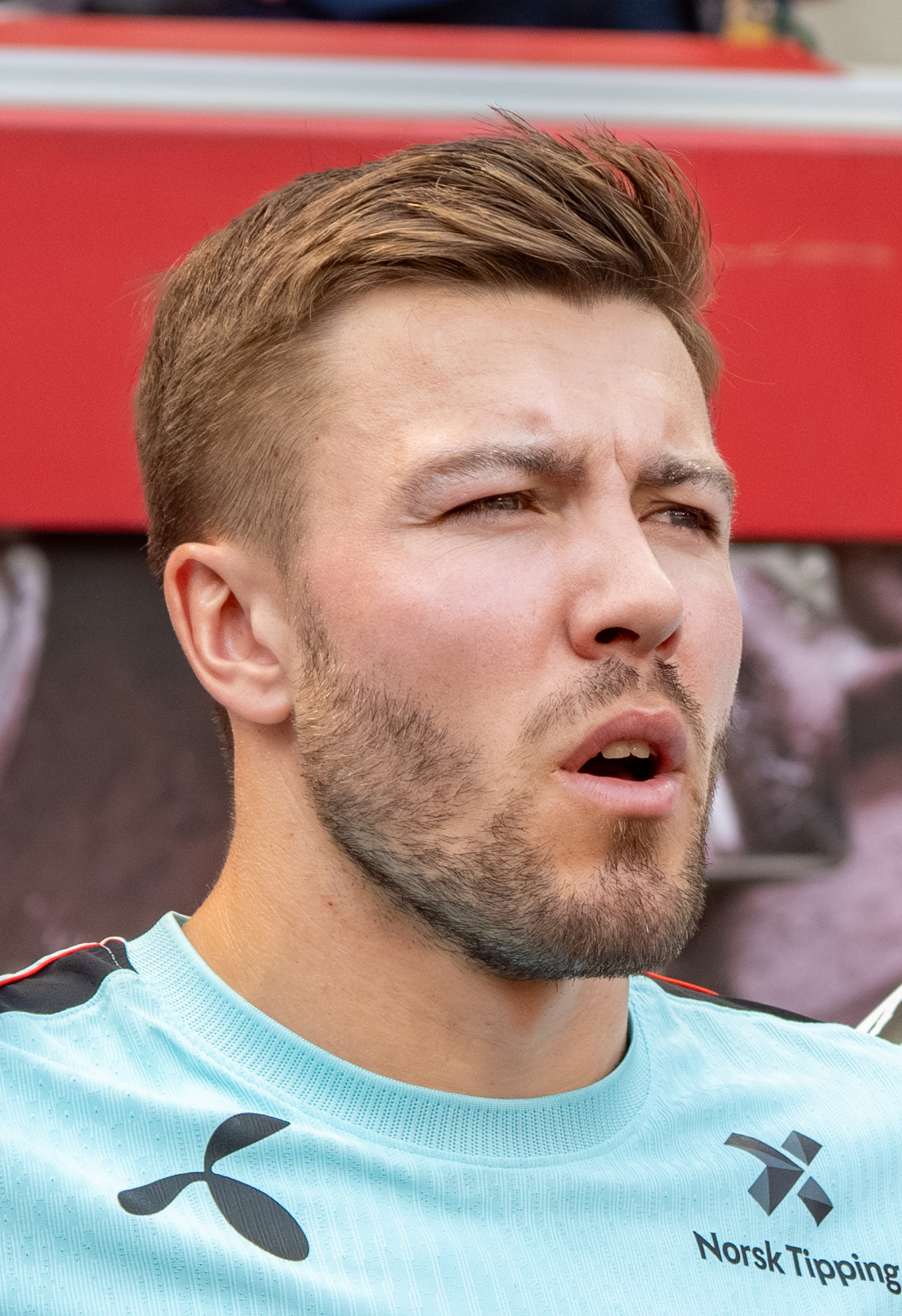
- Bjørkan with Norway in 2026

Personal information
- Full name: Fredrik André Bjørkan
- Date of birth: 21 August 1998 (age 28)
- Place of birth: Bodø, Norway
- Height: 1.80 m (5 ft 11 in)
- Position: Left-back

Team information
- Current team: Bodø/Glimt
- Number: 15

Youth career
- 2013–2015: Bodø/Glimt

Senior career*
Years	Team	Apps	(Gls)
2015–2021	Bodø/Glimt	121	(8)
2022	Hertha BSC	8	(0)
2022	→ Feyenoord (loan)	1	(0)
2023–	Bodø/Glimt	103	(10)

International career^{‡}
2016	Norway U18	8	(0)
2019–2020	Norway U21	11	(0)
2021–2026	Norway	22	(1)
- * Club domestic league appearances and goals as of 20 November 2026 ‡ National team caps and goals as of 26 June 2026

Fredrik André Bjørkan (born 21 August 1998) is a Norwegian professional footballer who plays as a left-back for Eliteserien club Bodø/Glimt.

== Club career ==
=== Bodø/Glimt ===
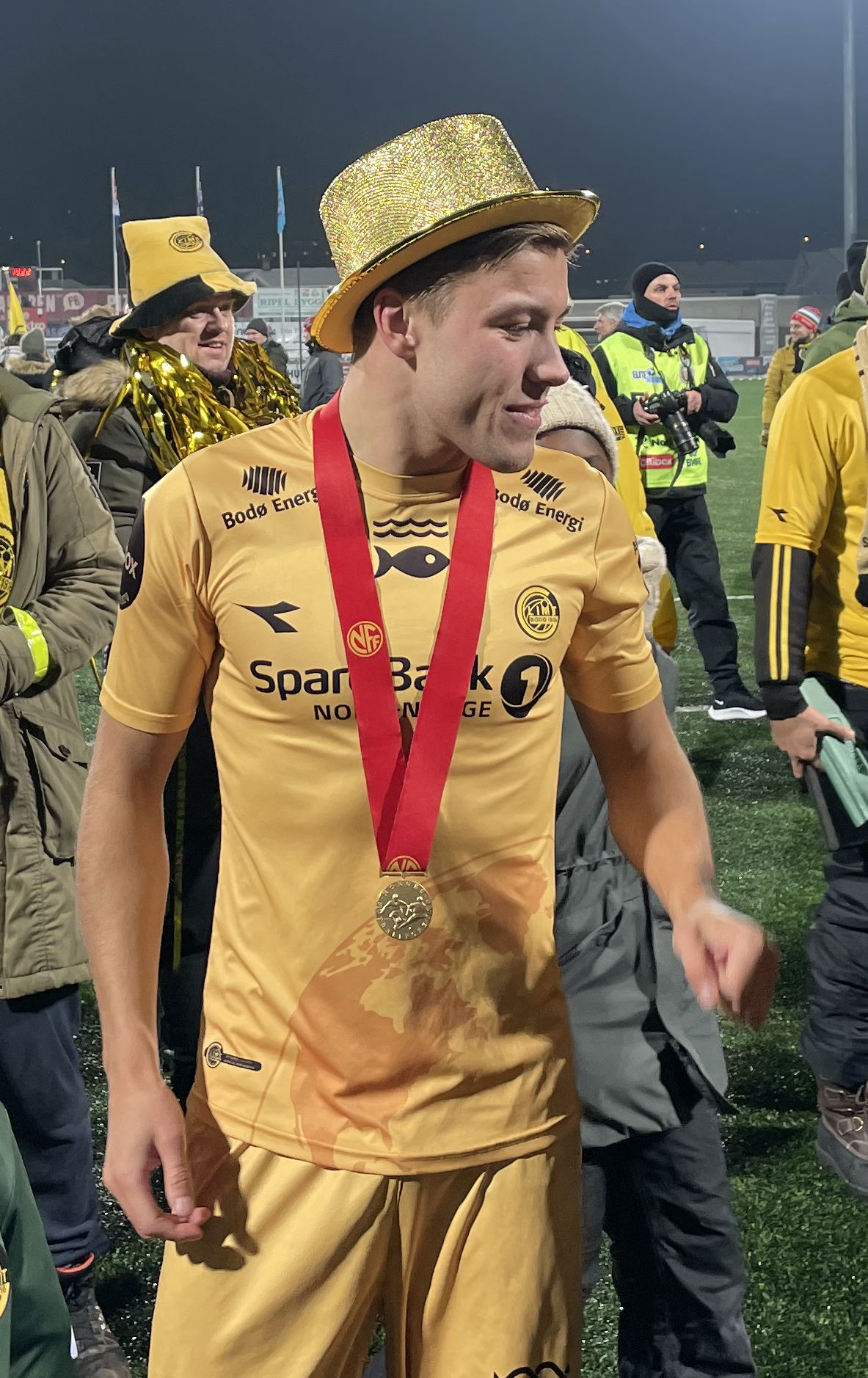
Bjørkan with Bodø/Glimt in 2021

Bjørkan was born in Bodø, Nordland. He started playing for hometown club Bodø/Glimt as a youth and made his first professional appearance at age 17, on 13 April 2016, in the Norwegian Football Cup, against IF Fløya, which Bodø/Glimt won 6–0. He made his league debut for Bodø/Glimt on 17 April 2016 against Molde where Bodø/Glimt lost 2–1.

=== Hertha BSC ===
On 1 December 2021, Bjørkan signed for Hertha BSC on a contract until 2025, joining at the beginning of the January transfer window. Bjørkan moved back to Bodø/Glimt in January 2023.

==== Feyenoord (loan) ====
On 29 August 2022, Feyenoord announced that it had signed Bjørkan on loan with an option to buy. The loan agreement was disbanded in January 2023.

== International career ==
In May 2021, Bjørkan was called up to the Norwegian national team for the first time. He made his debut during that international window on June 6, 2021, in a friendly match against Greece. He came on as a substitute for Birger Meling in a game Norway lost 2–1.

On 21 May 2026, he was included by Norway head coach Ståle Solbakken in a 26-man squad selected to participate in the 2026 FIFA World Cup.

On 10 September 2026, head coach Ståle Solbakken confirmed that Bjørkan would take a break from international football.

== Personal life ==
Fredrik André is the son of former player Aasmund Bjørkan.

== Career statistics ==
=== Club ===
As of match played 20 November 2026

Appearances and goals by club, season and competition
Club	Season	League			National cup (Note: Includes Norwegian Football Cup)		Europe		Total	
Club	Season	Division	Apps	Goals	Apps	Goals	Apps	Goals	Apps	Goals
Bodø/Glimt	2016	Eliteserien	9	0	3	0	—		12	0
Bodø/Glimt	2017	Norwegian First Division	12	2	0	0	—		12	2
Bodø/Glimt	2018	Eliteserien	13	0	1	0	—		13	0
Bodø/Glimt	2019	Eliteserien	29	3	1	0	—		30	3
Bodø/Glimt	2020	Eliteserien	30	1	0	0	3 (Note: Appearances in UEFA Europa League)	0	33	1
Bodø/Glimt	2021	Eliteserien	28	2	0	0	8 (Note: One appearance in UEFA Champions League, seven appearances in UEFA Europa Conference League)	0	36	2
Bodø/Glimt	Total		121	8	5	0	11	0	137	8
Hertha BSC	2021–22	Bundesliga	9	0	0	0	—		9	0
Feyenoord (loan)	2022–23	Eredivisie	1	0	0	0	0	0	1	0
Bodø/Glimt	2023	Eliteserien	25	1	6	0	14 (Note: Appearances in UEFA Europa Conference League)	0	45	1
Bodø/Glimt	2024	Eliteserien	24	4	1	0	22 (Note: Six appearances in UEFA Champions League, sixteen appearances and one goal in UEFA Europa League)	1	37	4
Bodø/Glimt	2025	Eliteserien	29	3	2	0	6 (Note: Appearances in UEFA Champions League)	0	37	3
Bodø/Glimt	2026	Eliteserien	25	2	4	0	14	1	43	3
Bodø/Glimt	Total		103	10	13	0	56	2	172	12
Career total			234	18	18	0	67	2	319	20

=== International ===
As of match played 26 June 2026

Appearances and goals by national team and year
National team	Year	Apps	Goals
Norway	2021	2	0
Norway	2022	6	0
Norway	2023	4	1
Norway	2024	2	0
Norway	2025	3	0
Norway	2026	5	0
Total		22	1

Scores and results list Norway's goal tally first, score column indicates score after each Bjørkan goal.

List of international goals scored by Fredrik André Bjørkan
No.	Date	Venue	Opponent	Score	Result	Competition
1	7 September 2023	Ullevaal Stadion, Oslo, Norway	Jordan	4–0	6–0	Friendly

== Honours ==
Bodø/Glimt

- Eliteserien: 2020, 2021, 2023, 2024
- Norwegian Football Cup: 2025–26

individual

- UEFA Europa League Team of the Season: 2024–25
