= Daniel Bassi =

Norwegian footballer (born 2004)

Personal information
- Full name: Daniel Joshua Bassi Jakobsen
- Date of birth: 31 October 2004 (age 21)
- Place of birth: Oslo, Norway
- Height: 1.78 m (5 ft 10 in)
- Position: Midfielder

Team information
- Current team: Lillestrøm
- Number: 22

Youth career
- –2015: Lille Tøyen
- 2015–2022: Tromsø

Senior career*
Years	Team	Apps	(Gls)
2022–2023	Tromsø	8	(1)
2023–2026	Bodø/Glimt	34	(1)
2026–	Lillestrøm	6	(0)

International career^{‡}
2023	Norway U19	4	(0)
2023	Norway U20	2	(0)
2025–	Norway U21	8	(1)
- * Club domestic league appearances and goals as of 23 October 2026 ‡ National team caps and goals as of 29 September 2026

Daniel Joshua Bassi Jakobsen (born 31 October 2004) is a Norwegian professional footballer who plays as a midfielder for Lillestrøm.

== Early life ==
Bassi initially grew up in Oslo, playing childhood football for Lille Tøyen FK. His father is Norwegian and his mother Sierra Leonean. In 2015 his family moved to Tromsø, and Bassi joined the youth section of Tromsø IL.

== Club career ==
Bassi made his senior debut for Tromsø in June 2022, appearing in a Norwegian Cup match against Skjervøy. He made his Eliteserien debut on 30 April 2023 in a home match against Viking. During the 2023 season, he became more involved in Tromsø's first team, and his performances drew attention from clubs abroad.

Bassi joined Bodø/Glimt in August 2023. After being limited by injury during 2024, he established himself more prominently in 2025. On 17 September 2025, he scored in a 2–2 draw away to Slavia Prague, becoming the first player to score for Bodø/Glimt in the UEFA Champions League league phase.

== International career ==
Without having prior experience as a Norway youth international, Bassi was selected for the Norway U19 squad to participate in the 2023 UEFA European Under-19 Championship. Bassi also played two games for Norway U20 in 2023 – a 5-0 win over Rumania and a 2-1 win versus the Czech Republic. In 2025 he returned to international duty with Norway U21, beating Denmark 1-0 in a friendly, and hammering Slovenia 5-0 in the first round Euro Qualifier. Bassi scored the second goal in the game and assisted another.

== Career statistics ==
=== Club ===
As of match played 22 October 2026

Appearances and goals by club, season and competition
Club	Season	League			National cup		Continental		Total	
Club	Season	Division	Apps	Goals	Apps	Goals	Apps	Goals	Apps	Goals
Tromsø	2022	Eliteserien	0	0	2	0	–		2	0
Tromsø	2023	Eliteserien	8	1	2	1	–		10	2
Tromsø	Total		8	1	4	1	–		12	2
Bodø/Glimt	2023	Eliteserien	10	0	0	0	4	0	14	0
Bodø/Glimt	2024	Eliteserien	0	0	0	0	0	0	0	0
Bodø/Glimt	2025	Eliteserien	14	1	3	0	4 (Note: Four appearances and one goal in UEFA Champions League)	1	21	2
Bodø/Glimt	2026	Eliteserien	10	0	5	1	1	0	16	1
Bodø/Glimt	Total		34	1	8	1	9	1	51	4
Lillestrøm	2026	Eliteserien	6	0	0	0	3 (Note: Three appearances in UEFA Europa League)	0	9	0
Career total			48	2	12	2	12	1	72	5

== Honours ==
Bodø/Glimt

- Eliteserien: 2023
- Norwegian Football Cup: 2025–26
