= Håkon Evjen =

Norwegian footballer (born 2000)

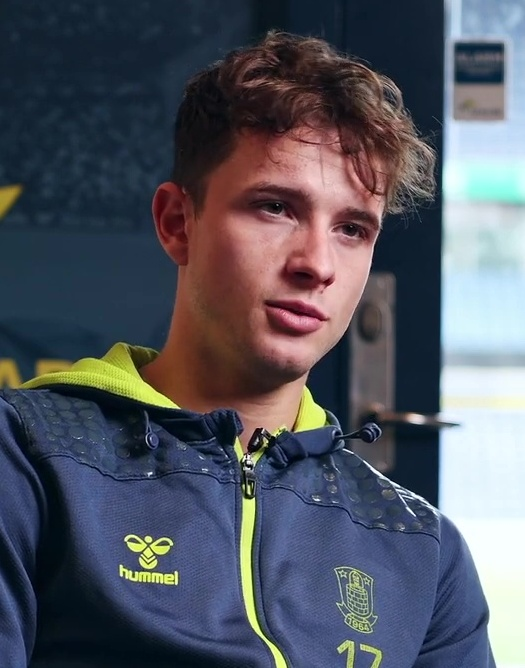
- Evjen in 2023

Personal information
- Date of birth: 14 February 2000 (age 26)
- Place of birth: Narvik, Norway
- Height: 1.73 m (5 ft 8 in)
- Position: Midfielder

Team information
- Current team: Bodø/Glimt
- Number: 26

Youth career
- –2016: Mjølner
- 2016–2017: Bodø/Glimt

Senior career*
Years	Team	Apps	(Gls)
2015–2016	Mjølner	23	(0)
2017–2019	Bodø/Glimt	47	(14)
2020–2023	AZ	44	(4)
2020–2022	Jong AZ	20	(4)
2023	Brøndby	26	(4)
2024–	Bodø/Glimt	68	(13)

International career^{‡}
2015	Norway U15	3	(0)
2016	Norway U16	4	(0)
2017	Norway U17	10	(1)
2018	Norway U18	6	(2)
2018	Norway U19	3	(0)
2019	Norway U20	3	(0)
2019–2023	Norway U21	21	(1)
2020	Norway	1	(0)
- * Club domestic league appearances and goals as of 26 July 2026 ‡ National team caps and goals as of 28 June 2023

Håkon Evjen (born 14 February 2000) is a Norwegian professional footballer who plays as a midfielder for Eliteserien club Bodø/Glimt.

== Club career ==
Evjen started out playing with his hometown club, FK Mjølner, before moving to Bodø/Glimt with his brother in 2016.

After a year with the youth team, Evjen signed his first professional contract with Bodø/Glimt in August 2017. He made his debut on 22 October, replacing Jens Petter Hauge during a First Division win against Jerv.

On 17 September 2019, Bodø/Glimt announced Evjen would be leaving for AZ Alkmaar on 1 January 2020. He signed a four-and-a-half-year contract with the club.

On 17 January 2023, Evjen joined Danish Superliga side Brøndby IF for an undisclosed fee, signing a contract until June 2027 with the club.

Evjen returned to Bodø/Glimt on 27 January 2024, signing a four-year contract. On 24 February 2026, he scored his first UEFA Champions League goal in a 2–1 away win over Inter Milan, securing his club's progress to the round of 16.

== International career ==
Evjen represented the national under-17 team at the 2017 UEFA European Under-17 Championship. He made two appearances in the qualifying tournament, scoring once in a draw with Russia. He went on to play twice in the finals.

Evjen played in all three matches of the Norwegian U-20 team during the 2019 FIFA U-20 World Cup.

== Personal life ==
Evjen is the son of former footballer Andreas Evjen, who captained Bodø/Glimt in the 1990s. His twin brother, Henrik, currently plays in the FK Mjølner youth system, where their father coaches.

== Career statistics ==
=== Club ===
As of match played 26 July 2026

Appearances and goals by club, season and competition
Club	Season	League			National cup (Note: Includes Norwegian Football Cup, KNVB Cup, Danish Cup)		Europe		Total	
Club	Season	Division	Apps	Goals	Apps	Goals	Apps	Goals	Apps	Goals
Mjølner	2015	Norwegian Second Division	16	0	1	0	–		17	0
Mjølner	2016	Norwegian Third Division	7	0	1	0	–		8	0
Mjølner	Total		23	0	2	0	–		25	0
Bodø/Glimt	2017	Norwegian First Division	3	0	0	0	–		3	0
Bodø/Glimt	2018	Eliteserien	15	1	2	0	–		17	1
Bodø/Glimt	2019	Eliteserien	29	13	0	0	–		29	13
Bodø/Glimt	Total		47	14	2	0	–		49	14
AZ	2019–20	Eredivisie	3	0	1	0	2 (Note: Appearances in UEFA Europa League)	0	6	0
AZ	2020–21	Eredivisie	9	1	1	0	2	0	12	1
AZ	2021–22	Eredivisie	24	3	2	0	7 (Note: One appearances in UEFA Europa League, six appearances in UEFA Europa Conference League)	1	33	4
AZ	2022–23	Eredivisie	8	0	0	0	7 (Note: Appearances in UEFA Europa Conference League)	2	15	2
AZ	Total		44	4	4	0	18	3	66	7
Brøndby	2022–23	Danish Superliga	15	3	1	0	–		16	3
Brøndby	2023–24	Danish Superliga	11	1	2	0	–		13	1
Brøndby	Total		26	4	3	0	–		29	4
Bodø/Glimt	2023	Eliteserien	–		–		2	0	2	0
Bodø/Glimt	2024	Eliteserien	26	4	1	1	12 (Note: Six appearances in UEFA Champions League, six appearances and two goals in UEFA Europa League)	2	39	7
Bodø/Glimt	2025	Eliteserien	29	4	1	0	17 (Note: Nine appearances and one goals in UEFA Europa League, eight appearances and one goal in UEFA Champions League)	2	47	6
Bodø/Glimt	2026	Eliteserien	13	5	3	1	6 (Note: Four appearances and one goal in UEFA Champions League)	1	22	7
Bodø/Glimt	Total		68	13	5	2	37	5	110	20
Career total			208	35	16	2	55	8	279	45

=== International ===
As of match played 18 November 2020

Appearances and goals by national team and year
National team	Year	Apps	Goals
Norway	2020	1	0
Total		1	0

== Honours ==
Bodø/Glimt

- Eliteserien: 2024
- Norwegian First Division: 2017
- Norwegian Football Cup: 2025–26

Individual

- Eliteserien Player of the Year: 2019
- Eliteserien Young Player of the Year: 2019
