= 2019 FK Bodø/Glimt season =

Bodø/Glimt
2019 season
- President: Hege Leirfall Ingebrigtsen
- Manager: Kjetil Knutsen
- Stadium: Aspmyra Stadion
- Eliteserien: 2nd
- Norwegian Cup: Second Round vs Strømmen
- Top goalscorer: League: Håkon Evjen (11); All: Håkon Evjen (11)
Home colours	Away colours	Third colours

The 2019 season was Bodø/Glimt's second season back in the Eliteserien since their relegation at the end of the 2016 season. Bodø/Glimt finished the season in second position, qualifying for the first qualifying round of the UEFA Europa League. In the Norwegian Cup, they were knocked out by Strømmen in the second round.

== Squad ==
As of match played 1 December 2019

No.	Name	Nationality	Position	Date of birth (age)	Signed from	Signed in	Contract ends	Apps.	Goals
Goalkeepers
1	Ricardo	(Brazil)	GK	18 February 1993 (aged 26)	RoPS	2017		78	0
13	Nikita Khaykin	(Russia)	GK	11 July 1995 (aged 24)	Hapoel Kfar Saba	2019		3	0
25	Marcus Andersen	(Norway)	GK	29 May 2001 (aged 18)	Youth team	2019		0	0
39	Sivert Hagen Jarmund	(Norway)	GK	15 February 2001 (aged 18)	Youth team	2018		0	0
Defenders
2	Marius Lode	(Norway)	DF	11 March 1993 (aged 26)	Bryne	2017		78	0
4	Vegard Bergan	(Norway)	DF	20 February 1995 (aged 24)	Odd	2019		22	1
17	José Isidoro	(Spain)	DF	1 August 1986 (aged 33)	Almería	2018		29	1
18	Brede Moe	(Norway)	DF	15 December 1991 (aged 27)	Rosenborg	2015		42	2
24	Fredrik André Bjørkan	(Norway)	DF	21 August 1998 (aged 21)	Youth team	2016		56	5
29	Erlend Dahl Reitan	(Norway)	DF	11 September 1997 (aged 22)	loan from Rosenborg	2019	2019	43	3
32	Casper Øyvann	(Norway)	DF	7 December 1999 (aged 19)	Youth team	2018		2	0
33	William Moan Mikalsen	(Norway)	DF	10 June 2000 (aged 19)	Youth team	2018		2	0
Midfielders
6	Vegard Moberg	(Norway)	MF	23 January 1991 (aged 28)	Sogndal	2017		78	10
7	Patrick Berg	(Norway)	MF	24 November 1997 (aged 22)	Youth team	2014		97	4
10	Philip Zinckernagel	(Denmark)	MF	16 December 1994 (aged 24)	SønderjyskE	2018		58	13
14	Ulrik Saltnes	(Norway)	MF	10 November 1992 (aged 27)	Brønnøysund	2011		179	34
16	Morten Konradsen	(Norway)	MF	3 May 1996 (aged 23)	Rosenborg	2018		105	11
22	Ole Sveen	(Norway)	MF	5 January 1990 (aged 29)	Sogndal	2019		10	1
23	Oliver Sigurjónsson	(Iceland)	MF	3 March 1995 (aged 24)	Breiðablik	2017		6	1
26	Håkon Evjen	(Norway)	MF	14 February 2000 (aged 19)	Mjølner	2017		49	14
35	Elias Hoff Melkersen	(Norway)	MF	31 December 2002 (aged 16)	Youth team	2019		1	0
37	Ask Tjaerandsen-Skau	(Norway)	MF	14 January 2001 (aged 18)	Youth team	2018		2	1
Forwards
8	Victor Boniface	(Nigeria)	FW	23 December 2000 (aged 18)	Real Sapphire	2019		8	1
9	Endre Kupen	(Norway)	FW	1 July 1990 (aged 29)	Florø	2018		10	0
11	Jens Petter Hauge	(Norway)	FW	12 October 1999 (aged 20)	Youth team	2016		97	18
15	Runar Hauge	(Norway)	FW	1 September 2001 (aged 18)	Youth team	2017		5	0
19	Amadou Konaté	(France)	FW	1 January 1997 (aged 22)	Boulogne	2019		5	3
34	Tobias Lillevold Johnsen	(Norway)	FW	29 April 2000 (aged 19)	Youth team	2018		1	0
Out on loan
36	Andreas van der Spa	(Norway)	DF	7 January 1999 (aged 20)	Youth team	2018		1	0
	Adrian Skindlo	(Norway)	FW	28 January 1999 (aged 20)	Youth team	2018		1	0
Players who left club during season
10	José Ángel	(Spain)	MF	21 June 1992 (aged 27)	Almería	2017		55	2
20	Amor Layouni	(Tunisia)	FW	3 October 1992 (aged 27)	Elverum	2017		63	15
21	Geir André Herrem	(Norway)	FW	28 January 1988 (aged 31)	Åsane	2018		37	9
22	Felix Myhre	(Norway)	MF	4 March 1999 (aged 20)	Vålerenga	2019	2019	3	0
28	William Arne Hanssen	(Norway)	FW	10 May 1998 (aged 21)	Youth team	2017		5	0

== Transfers ==
=== Winter ===
In: Note: Flags indicate national team as defined under FIFA eligibility rules; some limited exceptions apply. Players may hold more than one non-FIFA nationality.

No.	Pos.	Nation	Player
4	DF	NOR	Vegard Bergan (from (Norway) Odd)
6	FW	NGR	Victor Boniface (from (Nigeria) Real Sapphire)
11	FW	NOR	Jens Petter Hauge (loan return from (Norway) Aalesund)
12	GK	RUS	Nikita Khaykin (from (Israel) Hapoel Kfar Saba)
19	FW	FRA	Amadou Konaté (from (France) Boulogne)
22	MF	NOR	Felix Myhre (on loan from (Norway) Vålerenga)
23	MF	ISL	Oliver Sigurjónsson (loan return from (Iceland) Breiðablik)
29	DF	NOR	Erlend Dahl Reitan (on loan from (Norway) Rosenborg)

Out: Note: Flags indicate national team as defined under FIFA eligibility rules; some limited exceptions apply. Players may hold more than one non-FIFA nationality.

No.	Pos.	Nation	Player
3	DF	NOR	Emil Jonassen (to (Belarus) BATE Borisov)
4	DF	NOR	Martin Bjørnbak (to (Norway) Molde)
5	DF	NOR	Thomas Jacobsen (to (Norway) Fauske/Sprint)
7	MF	NOR	Thomas Drage (to (Norway) Fredrikstad)
8	DF	NOR	Erik Wollen Steen (to (Norway) Åsane)
10	MF	ESP	José Ángel (on loan to (Moldova) Sheriff Tiraspol)
11	FW	NGR	Marco Tagbajumi (to (Saudi Arabia) Najran)
12	GK	POL	Artur Krysiak (to (Poland) Odra Opole)
22	FW	NOR	Kristian Fardal Opseth (to (Turkey) Erzurumspor)
36	DF	NOR	Andreas van der Spa (on loan to (Norway) Alta)
—	FW	NOR	Andrian Skindlo (on loan to (Iceland) Afturelding)

=== Summer ===
In: Note: Flags indicate national team as defined under FIFA eligibility rules; some limited exceptions apply. Players may hold more than one non-FIFA nationality.

No.	Pos.	Nation	Player
22	MF	NOR	Ole Sveen (from (Norway) Sogndal)

Out: Note: Flags indicate national team as defined under FIFA eligibility rules; some limited exceptions apply. Players may hold more than one non-FIFA nationality.

No.	Pos.	Nation	Player
10	MF	ESP	José Ángel (to (Spain) Cartagena, previously on loan to (Moldova) Sheriff Tiraspol)
20	FW	TUN	Amor Layouni (to (Egypt) Pyramids)
21	FW	NOR	Geir Herrem (to (Sweden) Kalmar)
22	MF	NOR	Felix Myhre (loan return to (Norway) Vålerenga)
—	FW	NOR	Andrian Skindlo (on loan to (Norway) Mjølner, previously on loan to (Iceland) Afturelding)

== Competitions ==
=== Overview ===
Competition	First match	Last match	Starting round	Final position	Record							
Competition	First match	Last match	Starting round	Final position	Pld	W	D	L	GF	GA	GD	Win %
Eliteserien	31 March 2019	1 December 2019	Matchday 1	2nd	30	15	9	6	64	44	+20	50.00
Norwegian Cup	1 May 2019	22 May 2019	First round	Second round	2	1	0	1	9	2	+7	50.00
Total					32	16	9	7	73	46	+27	50.00

Last updated: 1 December 2019
Source: Competitions

=== Eliteserien ===
==== Results summary ====
Overall								Home						Away					
Pld	W	D	L	GF	GA	GD	Pts	W	D	L	GF	GA	GD	W	D	L	GF	GA	GD
30	15	9	6	64	44	+20	54	10	4	1	39	12	+27	5	5	5	25	32	−7

Last updated: 1 December 2019.
Source: see below

==== Results by round ====
Round	1	2	3	4	5	6	7	8	9	10	11	12	13	14	15	16	17	18	19	20	21	22	23	24	25	26	27	28	29	30
Ground	H	A	H	H	A	H	A	A	H	H	A	H	A	H	A	H	A	A	H	A	H	A	H	A	H	A	H	A	H	A
Result	W	W	W	D	L	W	D	W	L	W	W	W	L	W	W	W	W	D	W	L	D	D	W	D	D	D	D	L	W	L
Position	1	3	2	2	3	2	3	3	4	3	3	2	2	2	2	2	1	2	1	2	2	2	2	2	2	2	2	2	2	2

Updated to match(es) played on 1 December 2019. Source: see below
A = Away; H = Home; W = Win; D = Draw; L = Loss

==== Results ====
31 March 2019 1	Bodø/Glimt	2–0	Rosenborg	Bodø
20:00 CEST (UTC+2)	Konradsen 43'; Saltnes (yellow card) 52'; Layouni 60'; Moberg (yellow card) 61'; Ricardo (yellow card) 65'	Report	Jensen (yellow card) 45'; Bendtner (yellow card) 65'	Stadium: Aspmyra Stadion; Attendance: 2,793; Referee: Tom Harald Hagen

6 April 2019 2	Mjøndalen	4–5	Bodø/Glimt	Mjøndalen
18:00 CEST (UTC+2)	Brochmann 45+1' (yellow card) 56'; Johansen 48'; Sell 60' (yellow card) 82'; Scriven 90+7'	Report	Konradsen 20'; Moberg 36' (pen.); Lode (yellow card) 45+1'; Herrem 71', 75'; Sigurjónsson (yellow card) 84'; Evjen 90+11'	Stadium: Consto Arena; Attendance: 2,211; Referee: Ola Hobber Nilsen

14 April 2019 3	Bodø/Glimt	3–2	Molde	Bodø
18:00 CEST (UTC+2)	Saltnes 21'; Reitan (yellow card) 28'; Bergan 38'; Bjørnbak 72' (o.g.)	Report	Haugen (yellow card) 28'; Gabrielsen (yellow card) 43'; Omoijuanfo 83' (pen.); James 86'	Stadium: Aspmyra Stadion; Attendance: 3,240; Referee: Sigurd Smehus Kringstad

22 April 2019 4	Bodø/Glimt	1–1	Sarpsborg 08	Bodø
18:00 CEST (UTC+2)	Bjørkan 5'; Moberg (yellow card) 81'; Lode (yellow card) 88'	Report	Nielsen (yellow card) 4'; Salvesen 85'	Stadium: Aspmyra Stadion; Attendance: 3,663; Referee: Tommy Skjerven

28 April 2019 5	Stabæk	2–0	Bodø/Glimt	Bærum
18:00 CEST (UTC+2)	Vihmann (yellow card) 9'; Boli 22', 25' (pen.); Bohinen (yellow card) 70'	Report	Zinckernagel (yellow card) 53'	Stadium: Nadderud Stadion; Attendance: 3,531; Referee: Kristoffer Hagenes

5 May 2019 6	Bodø/Glimt	4–0	Lillestrøm	Bodø
18:00 CEST (UTC+2)	Layoni 14', 44', 52'; Herrem 33'; J.Hauge (yellow card) 77'	Report	Olsen (yellow card) 40'; Kippe (yellow card) 63'	Stadium: Aspmyra Stadion; Attendance: 2,789; Referee: Sigurd Smehus Kringstad

12 May 2019 7	Haugesund	1–1	Bodø/Glimt	Haugesund
18:00 CEST (UTC+2)	Kallevåg (yellow card) 23' (yellow-red card) 25'; Wadji (yellow card) 63'; Desler (yellow card) 73'; Stølås 76'	Report	Reitan (yellow card) 44'; J.Hauge 74' (pen.); Berg (yellow card) 77'	Stadium: Haugesund Stadion; Attendance: 3,777; Referee: Trygve Kjensli

16 May 2019 8	Tromsø	1–2	Bodø/Glimt	Tromsø
18:00 CEST (UTC+2)	Pirinen 9'; Valakari (yellow card) 19'; Grønli (yellow card) 31'; Bakenga (yellow card) 87'	Report	Moberg (yellow card) 18'; Layouni 69' (pen.); Bjørkan (yellow card) 81'; Evjen 90+1'; Reitan (yellow card) 90+3'	Stadium: Alfheim Stadion; Attendance: 4,368; Referee: Ola Hobber Nilsen

19 May 2019 9	Bodø/Glimt	1–2	Brann	Bodø
20:00 CEST (UTC+2)	Bjørkan 43'	Report	Bamba 28'; Acosta 31'; Jenssen (yellow card) 62'	Stadium: Aspmyra Stadion; Attendance: 3,721; Referee: Dag Vidar Hafsås

16 June 2019 11	Bodø/Glimt	2–0	Strømsgodset	Bodø
18:00 CEST (UTC+2)	Evjen 64'; Glesnes 68' (o.g.); Layouni (yellow card) 69'	Report	Hauger (yellow card) 51'	Stadium: Aspmyra Stadion; Attendance: 3,061; Referee: Kristoffer Hagenes

23 June 2019 12	Viking	3–4	Bodø/Glimt	Stavanger
18:00 CEST (UTC+2)	Thorstvedt 37'; Sale 70'; Hove 90+3'	Report	Konradsen (yellow card) 5'; Bjørkan 18'; Herrem 28'; Berg (yellow card) 33'; Layouni 50'; Zinckernagel 66'; Isidoro (yellow card) 84'	Stadium: Viking Stadion; Attendance: 8,203; Referee: Tore Hansen

30 June 2019 13	Bodø/Glimt	3–0	Odd	Bodø
18:00 CEST (UTC+2)	Evjen 30'; Layouni (yellow card) 68'; Saltnes 70'; Zinckernagel 83'	Report	Jensen (yellow card) 38'; Rashani (yellow card) 90+1'	Stadium: Aspmyra Stadion; Attendance: 3,442; Referee: Trygve Kjensli

5 July 2019 14	Vålerenga	6–0	Bodø/Glimt	Oslo
19:00 CEST (UTC+2)	Dønnum 7', 17'; Finne 25'; Vilhjalmsson 29' (pen.); Shala 84'; Ejuke 90+3'	Report		Stadium: Intility Arena; Attendance: 8,836; Referee: Sigurd Smehus Kringstad

13 July 2019 15	Bodø/Glimt	5–1	Ranheim	Bodø
21:00 CEST (UTC+2)	Layouni 24', 67'; Herrem 83', 86'; Moberg (yellow card) 90+2'; Zinckernagel 90+3'	Report	Reginiussen 78'	Stadium: Aspmyra Stadion; Attendance: 3,322; Referee: Tommy Skjerven

5 August 2019 16	Strømsgodset	1–3	Bodø/Glimt	Drammen
19:00 CEST (UTC+2)	Mawa 90+1'	Report	Evjen 44', 58'; Kupen (yellow card) 77'; Sveen (yellow card) 78'; Layouni (yellow card) 82' (goal) 90+4'; Ricardo (yellow card) 90+3'	Stadium: Marienlyst Stadion; Attendance: 4,943; Referee: Espen Eskås

11 August 2019 17	Bodø/Glimt	2–1	Viking	Bodø
18:00 CEST (UTC+2)	Zinckernagel 2'; Evjen 32'; Ricardo (yellow card) 78'	Report	Vikstøl (yellow card) 16'; Tripić (yellow card) 45+2' (goal) 51'; Friðjónsson (yellow card) 85'	Stadium: Aspmyra Stadion; Attendance: 3,567; Referee: Trond Ivar Døvle

14 August 2019 10	Kristiansund	1–2	Bodø/Glimt	Kristiansund
19:00 CEST (UTC+2)	Coly (yellow card) 16'; Bye 80'	Report	Evjen 15'; Sveen (yellow card) 26' (yellow-red card) 66'; Bjørkan (yellow card) 55'; Reitan (yellow card) 60'; J.Hauge 72'	Stadium: Kristiansund Stadion; Attendance: 4,123; Referee: Tom Harald Hagen

19 August 2019 18	Sarpsborg 08	1–1	Bodø/Glimt	Sarpsborg
19:00 CEST (UTC+2)	Zachariassen 55'; Abdellaoue (yellow card) 74'; Ødegaard (yellow card) 77'; Nielsen (yellow card) 85'	Report	Evjen (yellow card) 36'; Berg (yellow card) 66'; Saltnes 83'	Stadium: Sarpsborg Stadion; Attendance: 5,311; Referee: Espen Eskås

26 August 2019 19	Bodø/Glimt	4–0	Vålerenga	Bodø
19:00 CEST (UTC+2)	Saltnes 10'; Evjen 55'; Dønnum 58' (o.g.); Sveen 70'	Report	Israelsson (yellow card) 90'	Stadium: Aspmyra Stadion; Attendance: 3,860; Referee: Kristoffer Hagenes

30 August 2019 21	Odd	3–1	Bodø/Glimt	Skien
19:00 CEST (UTC+2)	Nordkvelle 11', 81'; Ruud 21'; Rashani (yellow card) 69'	Report	Evjen (yellow card) 21'; Saltnes 49'; Zinckernagel (yellow card) 60'	Stadium: Skagerak Arena; Referee: Ola Hobber Nilsen

15 September 2019 21	Bodø/Glimt	3–3	Stabæk	Bodø
18:00 CEST (UTC+2)	Evjen 4'; Layouni (yellow card) 68' (goal) 84' (pen.); Bohinen 90+3' (o.g.)	Report	Brynhildsen 29'; Bohinen 43' (pen.) (yellow card) 90+4'; Amankwah (yellow card) 83'; Kassi 90+1'	Stadium: Aspmyra Stadion; Attendance: 3,569; Referee: Svein Oddvar Moen

22 September 2019 22	Ranheim	1–1	Bodø/Glimt	Trondheim
18:00 CEST (UTC+2)	Bakenga 28' (pen.)	Report	J.Hauge 90+2'	Stadium: EXTRA Arena; Attendance: 1,833; Referee: Tom Harald Hagen

29 September 2019 23	Bodø/Glimt	4–0	Tromsø	Bodø
20:00 CEST (UTC+2)	Zinckernagel 2', 64'; Evjen 23'; Moberg 60'	Report	Kongshavn (yellow card) 37'; Taylor (yellow card) 39'	Stadium: Aspmyra Stadion; Attendance: 4,248; Referee: Espen Eskås

6 October 2019 24	Lillestrøm	0–0	Bodø/Glimt	Lillestrøm
18:00 CEST (UTC+2)	Melgalvis (yellow card) 21'	Report		Stadium: Åråsen Stadion; Attendance: 5,305; Referee: Trygve Kjensli

21 October 2019 25	Bodø/Glimt	0–0	Mjøndalen	Bodø
19:00 CEST (UTC+2)		Report	Aasmundsen (yellow card) 72'; Hansen (yellow card) 90+1'	Stadium: Aspmyra Stadion; Attendance: 2,782; Referee: Tommy Skjerven

28 October 2019 26	Brann	1–1	Bodø/Glimt	Bergen
19:00 CET (UTC+1)	Bamba 53'; Haugen (yellow card) 64'	Report	Saltnes 9'; Berg (yellow card) 47'	Stadium: Brann Stadion; Attendance: 8,875; Referee: Rohit Saggi

3 November 2019 27	Bodø/Glimt	2–2	Haugesund	Bodø
18:00 CET (UTC+1)	Evjen 10'; Hauge 17'; Bjørkan (yellow card) 34' (yellow-red card) 73'; Boniface (yellow card) 58'	Report	Velde 19'; Bergan 79' (o.g.); Tronstad (yellow card) 87'	Stadium: Aspmyra Stadion; Attendance: 2,777; Referee: Tom Harald Hagen

10 November 2019 28	Rosenborg	3–2	Bodø/Glimt	Trondheim
20:00 CET (UTC+1)	Reginiussen 17' (yellow card) 79'; Hedenstad (yellow card) 57'; Helland 73' (pen.) (yellow card) 90+3'; Søderlund (yellow card) 78'; Lundemo] 90+5'	Report	J.Hauge 26' (pen.), 33'; Konradsen (yellow card) 72'; Ricardo (yellow card) 78'	Stadium: Lerkendal Stadion; Referee: Espen Eskås

24 November 2019 29	Bodø/Glimt	3–0	Kristiansund	Bodø
18:00 CET (UTC+1)	Evjen 60'; Saltnes 72'; Reitan 90+3'	Report		Stadium: Aspmyra Stadion; Attendance: 3,265; Referee: Trond Ivar Døvle

1 December 2019 30	Molde	4–2	Bodø/Glimt	Molde
18:00 CET (UTC+1)	James 8', 87'; Christensen (yellow card) 34'; Bolly 37'; Aursnes (yellow card) 56'; Eikrem 71' (yellow card) 73'; Forren (yellow card) 74'	Report	J.Hauge 59'; Boniface 90'	Stadium: Aker Stadion; Referee: Espen Eskås

==== Table ====
Pos	Team	Pld	W	D	L	GF	GA	GD	Pts	Qualification or relegation
1	Molde (C)	30	21	5	4	72	31	+41	68	Qualification for the Champions League first qualifying round
2	Bodø/Glimt	30	15	9	6	64	44	+20	54	Qualification for the Europa League first qualifying round
3	Rosenborg	30	14	10	6	53	41	+12	52	Qualification for the Europa League first qualifying round
4	Odd	30	15	7	8	45	40	+5	52	
5	Viking	30	13	8	9	55	42	+13	47	Qualification for the Europa League second qualifying round (Note: Viking qualified for the Europa League second qualifying round as winners of the 2019 Norwegian Cup.)

Source: Football Association of Norway (in Norwegian), Soccerway
Rules for classification: 1) Points; 2) Goal difference; 3) Goals scored; 4) Head-to-head points; 5) Head-to-head goal difference; 6) Head-to-head away goals scored (only if between two teams); 7) Head-to-head goals scored; 8) Play-off (only used to decide champions or relegation).
(C) Champions

=== Norwegian Cup ===
1 May 2019 First Round	Åga	0–8	Bodø/Glimt	Mo i Rana
18:00 CEST (UTC+2)	M.Trulsen (yellow card) 36'; D.Iversen (yellow card) 57'; S.Grindskar (yellow card) 83'	Report	Konaté 15', 53', 67'; Jensen 19' (o.g.); Hauge 30' (pen.), 55' (pen.); Sigurjónsson 40' (yellow card) 61'; Tjærandsen-Skau 83'	Stadium: Hauknes Kunstgressbane; Attendance: 1,000; Referee: Martin Berg

22 May 2019 Second Round	Strømmen	2–1	Bodø/Glimt	Strømmen
17:00 CEST (UTC+2)	Ø.Vestvatn 30'; U.Ness (yellow card) 69'; A.Hellum (yellow card) 106'; H.Thun 108'; Bjørkkjær (yellow card) 120'	Report	R.Hauge (yellow card) 62'; Isidoro 81'	Stadium: Strømmen Stadion; Attendance: 388; Referee: Harald Røvig Sletner

== Squad statistics ==
As of match played 1 December 2019

=== Appearances and goals ===
No.	Pos	Nat	Player	Total		Eliteserien		Norwegian Cup	
No.	Pos	Nat	Player	Apps	Goals	Apps	Goals	Apps	Goals
1	GK	(Brazil) BRA	Ricardo	30	0	29	0	0+1	0
2	DF	(Norway) NOR	Marius Lode	27	0	26	0	1	0
4	DF	(Norway) NOR	Vegard Bergan	22	1	17+4	1	1	0
6	MF	(Norway) NOR	Vegard Moberg	21	2	13+7	2	1	0
7	MF	(Norway) NOR	Patrick Berg	25	0	24	0	0+1	0
8	MF	(Nigeria) NGR	Victor Boniface	8	1	4+4	1	0	0
9	FW	(Norway) NOR	Endre Kupen	10	0	0+8	0	2	0
10	MF	(Denmark) DEN	Philip Zinckernagel	31	6	22+8	6	1	0
11	FW	(Norway) NOR	Jens Hauge	30	9	8+21	7	1	2
12	GK	(Russia) RUS	Nikita Khaykin	3	0	1	0	2	0
14	MF	(Norway) NOR	Ulrik Saltnes	31	7	29+1	7	1	0
15	FW	(Norway) NOR	Runar Hauge	4	0	0+2	0	1+1	0
16	MF	(Norway) NOR	Morten Konradsen	24	2	13+10	2	1	0
17	DF	(Spain) ESP	José Isidoro	5	1	1+2	0	2	1
18	DF	(Norway) NOR	Brede Moe	16	0	16	0	0	0
19	FW	(France) FRA	Amadou Konaté	5	3	0+4	0	1	3
22	MF	(Norway) NOR	Ole Sveen	10	1	6+4	1	0	0
23	MF	(Iceland) ISL	Oliver Sigurjónsson	4	1	0+2	0	2	1
24	DF	(Norway) NOR	Fredrik Bjørkan	30	3	29	3	1	0
26	MF	(Norway) NOR	Håkon Evjen	29	13	29	13	0	0
29	DF	(Norway) NOR	Erlend Reitan	30	1	29	1	0+1	0
32	DF	(Norway) NOR	Casper Øyvann	1	0	0	0	1	0
33	DF	(Norway) NOR	William Moan Mikalsen	1	0	0	0	1	0
34	FW	(Norway) NOR	Tobias Lillevold Johnsen	1	0	0	0	0+1	0
37	MF	(Norway) NOR	Ask Tjærandsen-Skau	1	1	0	0	1	1
	MF	(Norway) NOR	Elias Hoff Melkersen	1	0	0	0	0+1	0
Players away from Bodø/Glimt on loan:
Players who left Bodø/Glimt during the season:
20	FW	(Tunisia) TUN	Amor Layouni	21	10	21	10	0	0
21	FW	(Norway) NOR	Geir Herrem	16	6	13+2	6	0+1	0
22	MF	(Norway) NOR	Felix Myhre	3	0	0+2	0	1	0

=== Goal scorers ===
Place	Position	Nation	Number	Name	Eliteserien	Norwegian Cup	Total
1	MF	(Norway)	26	Håkon Evjen	13	0	13
2	FW	(Tunisia)	20	Amor Layouni	10	0	10
3	FW	(Norway)	11	Jens Hauge	7	2	9
4	MF	(Norway)	14	Ulrik Saltnes	7	0	7
5	FW	(Norway)	21	Geir Herrem	6	0	6
5	MF	(Denmark)	10	Philip Zinckernagel	6	0	6
7				Own goal	4	1	5
8	DF	(Norway)	24	Fredrik Bjørkan	3	0	3
8	FW	(France)	19	Amadou Konaté	0	3	3
10	MF	(Norway)	16	Morten Konradsen	2	0	2
10	DF	(Norway)	6	Vegard Moberg	2	0	2
12	DF	(Norway)	4	Vegard Bergan	1	0	1
12	MF	(Norway)	22	Ole Sveen	1	0	1
12	DF	(Norway)	29	Erlend Reitan	1	0	1
12	MF	(Nigeria)	8	Victor Boniface	1	0	1
12	MF	(Iceland)	23	Oliver Sigurjónsson	0	1	1
12	DF	(Norway)	37	Ask Tjærandsen-Skau	0	1	1
12	DF	(Spain)	17	José Isidoro	0	1	1
				TOTALS	64	9	73

=== Clean sheets ===
Place	Position	Nation	Number	Name	Eliteserien	Norwegian Cup	Total
1	GK	(Brazil)	1	Ricardo	8	0	8
2	GK	(Russia)	12	Nikita Khaykin	1	1	2
				TOTALS	9	1	10

=== Disciplinary record ===
Number	Nation	Position	Name	Eliteserien		Norwegian Cup		Total	
Number	Nation	Position	Name	Yellow card	Red card	Yellow card	Red card	Yellow card	Red card
1	(Brazil)	GK	Ricardo	4	0	0	0	4	0
2	(Norway)	DF	Marius Lode	2	0	0	0	2	0
6	(Norway)	DF	Vegard Moberg	4	0	0	0	4	0
7	(Norway)	MF	Patrick Berg	4	0	0	0	4	0
8	(Nigeria)	MF	Victor Boniface	1	0	0	0	1	0
9	(Norway)	FW	Endre Kupen	1	0	0	0	1	0
10	(Denmark)	MF	Philip Zinckernagel	2	0	0	0	2	0
11	(Norway)	FW	Jens Hauge	1	0	0	0	1	0
14	(Norway)	MF	Ulrik Saltnes	1	0	0	0	1	0
15	(Norway)	FW	Runar Hauge	0	0	1	0	1	0
16	(Norway)	MF	Morten Konradsen	2	0	0	0	2	0
17	(Spain)	DF	José Isidoro	1	0	0	0	1	0
22	(Norway)	MF	Ole Sveen	3	1	0	0	3	1
23	(Iceland)	MF	Oliver Sigurjónsson	1	0	1	0	2	0
24	(Norway)	DF	Fredrik Bjørkan	4	1	0	0	4	1
26	(Norway)	MF	Håkon Evjen	2	0	0	0	2	0
29	(Norway)	DF	Erlend Reitan	4	0	0	0	4	0
Players away on loan:
Players who left Bodø/Glimt during the season:
20	(Tunisia)	FW	Amor Layouni	4	0	0	0	4	0
			TOTALS	42	2	2	0	44	2
