= 2018 FK Bodø/Glimt season =

Bodø/Glimt
2018 season
- President: Mads Torrissen
- Manager: Bjørn Tore Hansen
- Stadium: Aspmyra Stadion
- Eliteserien: 11th
- Norwegian Cup: Quarter-final vs Start
- Top goalscorer: League: Kristian Opseth (10); All: Kristian Opseth (12)
- Highest home attendance: 4,731 vs Tromsø (16 May 2018)
- Lowest home attendance: 851 vs Hødd (13 June 2018)
- Average home league attendance: 3,071 (11 November 2018)
Home colours	Away colours

The 2018 season was Bodø/Glimt's first season back in the Eliteserien since their relegation at the end of the 2016 season. Bodø/Glimt finished the season in 11th position, and reached the Quarter-final of Norwegian Cup before defeat to IK Start.

== Squad ==
As of match played 24 November 2018

No.	Name	Nationality	Position	Date of birth (age)	Signed from	Signed in	Contract ends	Apps.	Goals
Goalkeepers
12	Artur Krysiak	(Poland)	GK	11 August 1989 (aged 29)	Yeovil Town	2018		0	0
25	Ricardo	(Brazil)	GK	18 February 1993 (aged 25)	RoPS	2017		48	0
39	Sivert Hagen Jarmund	(Norway)	GK	15 February 2001 (aged 17)	Youth team	2018		0	0
40	Bror Ness Grötterud	(Norway)	GK	23 March 1999 (aged 19)	Youth team	2018		0	0
Defenders
2	Marius Lode	(Norway)	DF	11 March 1993 (aged 25)	Bryne	2017		51	0
3	Emil Jonassen	(Norway)	DF	17 February 1993 (aged 25)	Odd	2016		78	2
4	Martin Bjørnbak	(Norway)	DF	22 March 1992 (aged 26)	Haugesund	2017		63	10
8	Eirik Wollen Steen	(Norway)	DF	3 October 1993 (aged 25)	Åsane	2018		6	0
17	José Isidoro	(Spain)	DF	1 August 1986 (aged 32)	Almería	2018		24	0
18	Brede Moe	(Norway)	DF	15 December 1991 (aged 26)	Rosenborg	2015		26	2
24	Fredrik André Bjørkan	(Norway)	DF	21 August 1998 (aged 20)	Youth team	2016		26	2
32	Casper Øyvann	(Norway)	DF	7 December 1999 (aged 18)	Youth team	2018		1	0
33	William Moan Mikalsen	(Norway)	DF	10 June 2000 (aged 18)	Youth team	2018		1	0
36	Andreas van der Spa	(Norway)	DF	7 January 1999 (aged 19)	Youth team	2018		1	0
Midfielders
5	Thomas Jacobsen	(Norway)	MF	16 September 1983 (aged 35)	Lyn	2010		289	5
6	Vegard Moberg	(Norway)	MF	23 January 1991 (aged 27)	Sogndal	2017		56	8
7	Thomas Drage	(Norway)	MF	20 February 1992 (aged 26)	Falkenberg	2017		36	4
10	José Ángel	(Spain)	MF	21 June 1992 (aged 26)	Almería	2017		55	2
14	Ulrik Saltnes	(Norway)	MF	10 November 1992 (aged 26)	Brønnøysund	2011		148	27
16	Morten Konradsen	(Norway)	MF	3 May 1996 (aged 22)	Rosenborg	2018		81	9
19	Philip Zinckernagel	(Denmark)	MF	16 December 1994 (aged 23)	SønderjyskE	2018		27	7
26	Håkon Evjen	(Norway)	MF	14 February 2000 (aged 18)	Mjølner	2017		20	1
27	Patrick Berg	(Norway)	MF	24 November 1997 (aged 21)	Youth team	2014		72	4
37	Ask Tjaerandsen-Skau	(Norway)	MF	14 January 2001 (aged 17)	Youth team	2018		1	0
Forwards
9	Endre Kupen	(Norway)	FW	1 July 1990 (aged 28)	Florø	2018		0	0
11	Marco Tagbajumi	(Nigeria)	FW	1 July 1988 (aged 30)	Dundalk	2018		5	0
15	Runar Hauge	(Norway)	FW	1 September 2001 (aged 17)	Youth team	2017		1	0
20	Amor Layouni	(Sweden)	FW	3 October 1992 (aged 26)	Elverum	2017		42	5
21	Geir André Herrem	(Norway)	FW	28 January 1988 (aged 30)	Åsane	2018		21	3
22	Kristian Opseth	(Norway)	FW	6 January 1990 (aged 28)	Sogndal	2017		66	41
28	William Arne Hanssen	(Norway)	FW	10 May 1998 (aged 20)	Youth team	2017		5	0
34	Tobias Lillevold Johnsen	(Norway)	FW	29 April 2000 (aged 18)	Youth team	2018		0	0
35	Adrian Skindlo	(Norway)	FW	28 January 1999 (aged 19)	Youth team	2018		1	0
Out on loan
11	Jens Petter Hauge	(Norway)	FW	12 October 1999 (aged 19)	Youth team	2016		67	9
23	Oliver Sigurjónsson	(Iceland)	MF	3 March 1995 (aged 23)	Breiðablik	2017		2	0
Players who left club during season
12	Zoran Popović	(Serbia)	GK	28 May 1988 (aged 30)	Voždovac	2018		9	0
30	Trond Olsen	(Norway)	FW	5 February 1984 (aged 34)	Viking	2014		323	92

== Transfers ==
=== In ===
Date	Position	Nationality	Name	From	Fee	Ref.
27 November 2017	FW	(Norway)	Endre Kupen	Florø	Undisclosed	
5 January 2018	DF	(Norway)	Eirik Wollen Steen	Åsane	Undisclosed	
16 January 2018	DF	(Spain)	José Isidoro	Almería	Undisclosed	
12 February 2018	GK	(Serbia)	Zoran Popović	Voždovac	Undisclosed	
16 March 2018	FW	(Norway)	Geir André Herrem	Åsane	Undisclosed	
30 March 2018	MF	(Denmark)	Philip Zinckernagel	SønderjyskE	Undisclosed	
9 August 2018	GK	(Poland)	Artur Krysiak	Yeovil Town	Undisclosed	
15 August 2018	MF	(Norway)	Morten Konradsen	Rosenborg	Undisclosed	
3 September 2018	FW	(Nigeria)	Marco Tagbajumi	Dundalk	Undisclosed	

=== Out ===
Date	Position	Nationality	Name	To	Fee	Ref.
27 March 2018	GK	(Canada)	Simon Thomas	Kongsvinger	Undisclosed	
5 July 2018	GK	(Serbia)	Zoran Popović	Red Star Belgrade	Undisclosed	
15 August 2018	FW	(Norway)	Trond Olsen	Sogndal	Undisclosed	

=== Loans out ===
Date from	Position	Nationality	Name	To	Date to	Ref.
15 August 2018	FW	(Norway)	Jens Petter Hauge	Aalesund	End of season	

=== Released ===
Date	Position	Nationality	Name	Joined	Date
31 December 2018	GK	(Norway)	Bror Ness Grötterud	Leknes	

== Competitions ==
=== Eliteserien ===
==== Results summary ====
Overall								Home						Away					
Pld	W	D	L	GF	GA	GD	Pts	W	D	L	GF	GA	GD	W	D	L	GF	GA	GD
30	6	14	10	32	35	−3	32	4	6	5	22	18	+4	2	8	5	10	17	−7

Last updated: 24 November 2018.
Source: see below

==== Results by round ====
Round	1	2	3	4	5	6	7	8	9	10	11	12	13	14	15	16	17	18	19	20	21	22	23	24	25	26	27	28	29	30
Ground	H	A	A	A	H	A	A	H	A	H	A	H	A	H	A	H	A	H	H	A	H	A	H	A	H	A	H	A	H	A
Result	W	L	L	L	L	D	D	D	W	L	L	W	D	D	D	D	L	W	D	W	W	D	L	L	L	D	D	D	D	D
Position	3	6	10	15	15	14	13	14	13	13	14	11	11	12	12	12	12	12	12	11	11	11	11	11	11	11	11	11	11	11

Updated to match(es) played on 24 November 2018. Source: see below
A = Away; H = Home; W = Win; D = Draw; L = Loss

==== Results ====
11 March 2018 1	Bodø/Glimt	3–1	Lillestrøm	Bodø
18:00 CET (UTC+1)	Opseth 22', 87'; José Ángel (yellow card) 66'; Moe 81'	Report	Olsen 46'; Kippe (yellow card) 60'	Stadium: Aspmyra Stadion; Attendance: 3,484; Referee: Kristoffer Hagenes

18 March 2018 2	Brann	2–0	Bodø/Glimt	Bergen
18:00 CET (UTC+1)	Skålevik 18'; Wormgoor 41' (pen.)	Report	Popović (yellow card) 41'; Moberg (yellow card) 84'	Stadium: Brann Stadion; Attendance: 8,447; Referee: Tommy Skjerven

2 April 2018 3	Bodø/Glimt	0–3	Haugesund	Bodø
18:00 CEST (UTC+2)	Popović (yellow card) 81'	Report	Moe 20' (o.g.); David 42'; Kallevåg (yellow card) 45'; Gytkjær 82' (pen.)	Stadium: Aspmyra Stadion; Attendance: 2,934; Referee: Dag Vidar Hafsås

8 April 2018 4	Odd	1–0	Bodø/Glimt	Skien
18:00 CEST (UTC+2)	Ruud 67'; Samuelsen (yellow card) 86'	Report	José Ángel (yellow card) 65'	Stadium: Skagerak Arena; Attendance: 4,859; Referee: Rohit Saggi

16 April 2018 5	Bodø/Glimt	0–1	Rosenborg	Bodø
19:00 CEST (UTC+2)	Isidoro (yellow card) 34'; Leikvoll Moberg (yellow card) 90'	Report	Søderlund 47'	Stadium: Aspmyra Stadion; Attendance: 4,387; Referee: Trygve Kjensli

22 April 2018 6	Kristiansund	1–1	Bodø/Glimt	Kristiansund
18:00 CEST (UTC+2)	Aasmundsen 42'	Report	Hopmark 20' (o.g.)	Stadium: Kristiansund Stadion; Attendance: 4,003; Referee: Tom Harald Hagen

29 April 2018 7	Sarpsborg 08	0–0	Bodø/Glimt	Sarpsborg
18:00 CEST (UTC+2)	Askar (yellow card) 54'; Thomassen (yellow card) 65'; Zachariassen (yellow card) 89'	Report	Isidoro (yellow card) 70'; Opseth (penalty missed) 90+2'	Stadium: Sarpsborg Stadion; Attendance: 4,983; Referee: Sigurd Kringstad

6 May 2018 8	Bodø/Glimt	2–2	Strømsgodset	Bodø
18:00 CEST (UTC+2)	Opseth 1'; Bjørnbak 63'	Report	Andersen (yellow card) 21'; Parr 45+5'; Lindquist (yellow card) 47'; Pedersen 82' (pen.)	Stadium: Aspmyra Stadion; Attendance: 2,834; Referee: Tommy Skjerven

13 May 2018 9	Molde	1–2	Bodø/Glimt	Molde
18:00 CEST (UTC+2)	Hestad 44'; Aursnes (yellow card) 66'	Report	Zinckernagel 68'; Ricardo (yellow card) 90+1'; Opseth 90+4'	Stadium: Aker Stadion; Attendance: 6,768; Referee: Espen Andreas Eskås

16 May 2018 10	Bodø/Glimt	0–1	Tromsø	Bodø
18:00 CEST (UTC+2)	Saltnes (yellow card) 83'; Opseth (yellow card) 90+2'	Report	Taylor (yellow card) 37'; Espejord 43'; Bakenga (yellow card) 69'; Pedersen (yellow card) 83'	Stadium: Aspmyra Stadion; Attendance: 4,731; Referee: Kristoffer Hagenes

21 May 2018 11	Start	1–0	Bodø/Glimt	Kristiansand
18:00 CEST (UTC+2)	Børufsen 7'; Lowe (yellow card) 76'; Finnbogason (yellow card) 87'; Christensen (yellow card) 90+4'; Deumeland (yellow card) 90+4'	Report	Isidoro (yellow card) 45+1'; Hauge (yellow card) 67'; Jurado (yellow card) 79'; Zinckernagel (yellow card) 90+4'; Opseth (yellow card) 90+5'	Stadium: Sør Arena; Attendance: 3,500; Referee: Rohit Saggi

27 May 2018 12	Bodø/Glimt	4–0	Ranheim	Bodø
18:00 CEST (UTC+2)	Saltnes 5'; Evjen 48'; Zinckernagel 60'; Layouni 75'	Report		Stadium: Aspmyra Stadion; Attendance: 2,961; Referee: Tom Harald Hagen

10 June 2018 13	Stabæk	0–0	Bodø/Glimt	Bærum
18:00 CEST (UTC+2)	Børkeeiet (yellow card) 43'	Report	Moe (yellow card) 53'	Stadium: Nadderud Stadion; Attendance: 3,510; Referee: Trond Ivar Døvle

24 June 2018 14	Bodø/Glimt	1–1	Sandefjord	Bodø
18:00 CEST (UTC+2)	José Ángel 27'	Report	Kastrati 2'; Bindia (yellow card) 30'; Ofkir (yellow card) 78'; Seck (yellow card) 88'	Stadium: Aspmyra Stadion; Attendance: 2,615; Referee: Rohit Saggi

30 June 2018 15	Vålerenga	2–2	Bodø/Glimt	Oslo
18:00 CEST (UTC+2)	Lekven 29' (yellow card) 83'; Myhre 55'; Carvalho (yellow card) 90+1'	Report	Layouni 21'; Bjørnbak 84'; Moberg (yellow card) 89'; Moe (yellow card) 90+2'	Stadium: Intility Arena; Attendance: 7,872; Referee: Tommy Skjerven

8 July 2018 16	Bodø/Glimt	2–2	Brann	Bodø
18:00 CEST (UTC+2)	Opseth 23', 66'; Jurado (yellow card) 78'	Report	Nilsen 8'; Acosta (yellow card) 51'; Larsen 60'; Skålevik (yellow card) 76'	Stadium: Aspmyra Stadion; Attendance: 3,082; Referee: Espen Eskås

5 August 2018 17	Strømsgodset	4–0	Bodø/Glimt	Drammen
18:00 CEST (UTC+2)	Pedersen 14' (pen.), 74' (yellow card) 50'; Nguen 61'; Sætra 65'	Report		Stadium: Marienlyst Stadion; Attendance: 5,433; Referee: Ola Hobber Nilsen

12 August 2018 18	Bodø/Glimt	3–0	Kristiansund	Bodø
18:00 CEST (UTC+2)	Zinckernagel 12'; Opseth 35'; Jacobsen (yellow card) 53'; Saltnes (yellow card) 71'; José Ángel (penalty missed) 90+4'; Herrem 90+5'	Report	Aasbak (yellow card) 58'; Aasmundsen (yellow card) 80'	Stadium: Aspmyra Stadion; Attendance: 2,804; Referee: Sigurd Kringstad

20 August 2018 19	Bodø/Glimt	1–1	Odd	Bodø
19:00 CEST (UTC+2)	Saltnes (yellow card) 18'; Opseth 22'; Bjørnbak (yellow card) 88'	Report	Samuelsen (yellow card) 20'; Ruud 26'	Stadium: Aspmyra Stadion; Attendance: 2,881; Referee: Kai Erik Steen

25 August 2018 20	Tromsø	1–2	Bodø/Glimt	Tromsø
18:00 CEST (UTC+2)	Pedersen (yellow card) 45+2'; Antonsen 55'	Report	Saltnes 61'; Bjørnbak 65'; Ricardo (yellow card) 75'; Zinckernagel (yellow card) 81'	Stadium: Alfheim Stadion; Attendance: 4,701; Referee: Trond Ivar Døvle

2 September 2018 21	Bodø/Glimt	3–1	Sarpsborg 08	Bodø
18:00 CEST (UTC+2)	Zinckernagel 31'; Opseth 45'; Saltnes 47'	Report	Mortensen 33'; Halvorsen (yellow card) 79'	Stadium: Aspmyra Stadion; Attendance: 3,178; Referee: Ola Hobber Nilsen

16 September 2018 22	Sandefjord	1–1	Bodø/Glimt	Sandefjord
18:00 CEST (UTC+2)	Pálsson (yellow card) 46'; Fellah 68'	Report	Ángel (yellow card) 45+1'; Bjørnbak 66'	Stadium: Komplett Arena; Attendance: 2,556; Referee: Trygve Kjensli

23 September 2018 23	Bodø/Glimt	1–2	Start	Bodø
18:00 CEST (UTC+2)	Layouni (yellow card) 35'; Bjørkan (yellow card) 57'; Saltnes (yellow card) 62'; Zinckernagel 70'	Report	Käck 75'; Bringaker 85'	Stadium: Aspmyra Stadion; Attendance: 2,700; Referee: Rohit Saggi

30 September 2018 24	Haugesund	1–0	Bodø/Glimt	Haugesund
18:00 CEST (UTC+2)	David 52'	Report		Stadium: Haugesund Stadion; Attendance: 4,563; Referee: Kai Erik Steen

7 October 2018 25	Bodø/Glimt	0–1	Molde	Bodø
18:00 CEST (UTC+2)	Ángel (yellow card) 89'; Isidoro (yellow card) 90+3'	Report	Haaland 55', (yellow card) 82'; Remmer (yellow card) 88'; Hussain (yellow card) 89'; Sarr (yellow card) 90+1'	Stadium: Aspmyra Stadion; Attendance: 2,781; Referee: Kristoffer Hagenes

21 October 2018 26	Ranheim	0–0	Bodø/Glimt	Trondheim
18:00 CEST (UTC+2)	Foosnæs (yellow card) 88'	Report	Zinckernagel (yellow card) 27'; Evjen (yellow card) 80'	Stadium: EXTRA Arena; Attendance: 1,601; Referee: Tommy Skjerven

28 October 2018 27	Bodø/Glimt	1–1	Stabæk	Bodø
18:00 CEST (UTC+2)	Layouni 85'; Zinckernagel (yellow card) 86'	Report	Sæter (yellow card) 42'; Omoijuanfo 58'	Stadium: Aspmyra Stadion; Attendance: 2,887; Referee: Dag Vidar Hafsås

5 November 2018 28	Lillestrøm	1–1	Bodø/Glimt	Lillestrøm
19:00 CET (UTC+1)	Smárason 10'; Amundsen (yellow card) 68'	Report	Opseth 3'; Bjørnbak (yellow card) 41'; Layouni (yellow card) 67'	Stadium: Åråsen Stadion; Attendance: 5.510; Referee: Espen Eskås

11 November 2018 29	Bodø/Glimt	1–1	Vålerenga	Bodø
18:00 CET (UTC+1)	Zinckernagel 12'; Evjen (yellow card) 54'; José Ángel (yellow card) 90+1'	Report	Finne 41'; Lekven (yellow card) 45'; Nouri (yellow card) 75'; Ibrahim (yellow card) 88'	Stadium: Aspmyra Stadion; Attendance: 4,023; Referee: Tore Hansen

24 November 2018 30	Rosenborg	1–1	Bodø/Glimt	Trondheim
18:00 CET (UTC+1)	Trondsen (yellow card) 43' de Lanlay 73'	Report	Saltnes 70'	Stadium: Lerkendal Stadion; Attendance: 19,086; Referee: Ola Hobber Nilsen

==== Table ====
Pos	Team	Pld	W	D	L	GF	GA	GD	Pts
9	Odd	30	11	7	12	39	38	+1	40
10	Tromsø	30	11	3	16	41	48	−7	36
11	Bodø/Glimt	30	6	14	10	32	35	−3	32
12	Lillestrøm	30	7	11	12	34	44	−10	32
13	Strømsgodset	30	7	10	13	46	48	−2	31

Source: Football Association of Norway (in Norwegian), Soccerway
Rules for classification: 1) Points; 2) Goal difference; 3) Goals scored; 4) Head-to-head points; 5) Head-to-head goal difference; 6) Head-to-head away goals scored (only if between two teams); 7) Head-to-head goals scored; 8) Play-off (only used to decide champions or relegation).

=== Norwegian Cup ===
19 April 2018 First Round	Melbo	1–4	Bodø/Glimt	Melbu
16:45 CEST (UTC+2)	R.Tollefsen (yellow card) 14'; A.Pedersen 66'	Report	Drage (yellow card) 17'; Olsen 23'; Hauge 44' (pen.), 81'; Zinckernagel 52'	Stadium: Melbu Stadium; Attendance: 500; Referee: Martin Berg

2 May 2018 Second Round	Harstad	2–5	Bodø/Glimt	Harstad
18:00 CEST (UTC+2)	Andersen 4', 61'; P.Milakovic (yellow card) 70'; K.Arntsen (yellow card) 79'	Report	Drage 3'; Herrem 51'; Berg 68'; Bjørnbak 84'; Opseth 90+4'	Stadium: Harstad stadion Attendance: 1,273; Referee: Ali Al-Hatem

9 May 2018 Third Round	Mjølner	1–2	Bodø/Glimt	Narvik
18:00 CEST (UTC+2)	Torvanger 82'; Evjen (penalty missed) 90+3'	Report	Saltnes 61'; Herrem 69'	Stadium: Narvik Stadion; Attendance: 951; Referee: Daniel Higraff

13 June 2018 Fourth Round	Bodø/Glimt	2–2 (a.e.t.) (5–4 p)	Hødd	Bodø
18:30 CEST (UTC+2)	Berg 45'; Saltnes (yellow card) 104'; Bjørnbak 116' (pen.)	Report	Myklebust 9'; D.Eid (yellow card) 64'; Naglestad 95'	Stadium: Aspmyra Stadion; Attendance: 851; Referee: Dag Vidar Hafsås
	Penalties
	Moberg (penalty scored); Bjørnbak (penalty scored); Ángel (penalty scored); Saltnes (penalty scored); Opseth (penalty scored)		(penalty scored) Naglestad; (penalty scored) Haugan; (penalty missed) Saunes; (penalty scored) Hjelmeseth; (penalty scored) Wrele

26 September 2018 Quarterfinal	Start	2–1	Bodø/Glimt	Kristiansand
18:00 CEST (UTC+2)	Christensen 7'; Lowe (yellow card) 51'; Shala (yellow card) 64' (goal) 76'	Report	Opseth 19'; Ángel (yellow card) 70'; Tagbajumi (yellow card) 90'	Stadium: Sør Arena; Attendance: 5,026; Referee: Espen Eskås

== Squad statistics ==
As of match played 24 November 2018

=== Appearances and goals ===
No.	Pos	Nat	Player	Total		Eliteserien		Norwegian Cup	
No.	Pos	Nat	Player	Apps	Goals	Apps	Goals	Apps	Goals
2	DF	(Norway) NOR	Marius Lode	19	0	16	0	3	0
3	DF	(Norway) NOR	Emil Jonassen	16	0	8+4	0	3+1	0
4	DF	(Norway) NOR	Martin Bjørnbak	34	6	29	4	5	2
5	MF	(Norway) NOR	Thomas Jacobsen	16	0	13+3	0	0	0
6	MF	(Norway) NOR	Vegard Leikvoll Moberg	26	0	20+4	0	2	0
7	MF	(Norway) NOR	Thomas Drage	15	1	1+11	0	3	1
8	DF	(Norway) NOR	Eirik Wollen Steen	6	0	1+3	0	2	0
10	MF	(Spain) ESP	José Ángel	30	1	28	1	2	0
11	FW	(Nigeria) NGA	Marco Tagbajumi	5	0	0+4	0	0+1	0
14	MF	(Norway) NOR	Ulrik Saltnes	32	5	28	4	3+1	1
16	MF	(Norway) NOR	Morten Konradsen	4	0	0+4	0	0	0
17	DF	(Spain) ESP	José Isidoro	24	0	20+1	0	3	0
18	DF	(Norway) NOR	Brede Moe	20	1	20	1	0	0
19	MF	(Denmark) DEN	Philip Zinckernagel	27	7	22+2	6	2+1	1
20	FW	(Sweden) SWE	Amor Layouni	33	3	29+1	3	1+2	0
21	FW	(Norway) NOR	Geir André Herrem	21	3	0+16	1	4+1	2
22	FW	(Norway) NOR	Kristian Opseth	34	12	30	10	1+3	2
24	DF	(Norway) NOR	Fredrik André Bjørkan	14	0	13	0	1	0
25	GK	(Brazil) BRA	Ricardo	26	0	23	0	3	0
26	MF	(Norway) NOR	Håkon Evjen	17	1	8+7	1	1+1	0
27	MF	(Norway) NOR	Patrick Berg	24	2	6+13	0	5	2
32	DF	(Norway) NOR	Casper Øyvann	1	0	0	0	1	0
33	DF	(Norway) NOR	William Moan Mikalsen	1	0	0	0	1	0
35	FW	(Norway) NOR	Adrian Skindlo	1	0	0	0	0+1	0
36	DF	(Norway) NOR	Andreas van der Spa	1	0	0	0	0+1	0
37	MF	(Norway) NOR	Ask Tjærandsen-Skau	1	0	0	0	0+1	0
Players away from Bodø/Glimt on loan:
11	FW	(Norway) NOR	Jens Petter Hauge	15	2	3+8	0	4	2
Players who left Bodø/Glimt during the season:
12	GK	(Serbia) SRB	Zoran Popović	9	0	7	0	2	0
30	FW	(Norway) NOR	Trond Olsen	13	1	5+5	0	3	1

=== Goal scorers ===
Place	Position	Nation	Number	Name	Eliteserien	Norwegian Cup	Total
1	FW	(Norway)	22	Kristian Opseth	10	2	12
2	MF	(Denmark)	19	Philip Zinckernagel	6	1	7
2	DF	(Norway)	4	Martin Bjørnbak	4	2	6
4	MF	(Norway)	14	Ulrik Saltnes	4	1	5
5	FW	(Sweden)	20	Amor Layouni	3	0	3
5	FW	(Norway)	21	Geir André Herrem	1	2	3
7	FW	(Norway)	11	Jens Petter Hauge	0	2	2
7	MF	(Norway)	27	Patrick Berg	0	2	2
9	DF	(Norway)	18	Brede Moe	1	0	1
9	MF	(Norway)	26	Håkon Evjen	1	0	1
9	MF	(Spain)	10	José Ángel	1	0	1
9	FW	(Norway)	30	Trond Olsen	0	1	1
9	MF	(Norway)	7	Thomas Drage	0	1	1
9				Own goal	1	0	1
				TOTALS	32	14	46

=== Clean sheets ===
Place	Position	Nation	Number	Name	Eliteserien	Norwegian Cup	Total
1	GK	(Brazil)	25	Ricardo	5	0	5
				TOTALS	5	0	5

=== Disciplinary record ===
Number	Nation	Position	Name	Eliteserien		Norwegian Cup		Total	
Number	Nation	Position	Name	Booked	Sent off (straight red)	Booked	Sent off (straight red)	Booked	Sent off (straight red)
4	(Norway)	DF	Martin Bjørnbak	2	0	0	0	2	0
5	(Norway)	MF	Thomas Jacobsen	1	0	0	0	1	0
6	(Norway)	MF	Vegard Leikvoll Moberg	3	0	0	0	3	0
7	(Norway)	MF	Thomas Drage	0	0	1	0	1	0
10	(Spain)	MF	José Ángel	7	0	1	0	8	0
11	(Nigeria)	FW	Marco Tagbajumi	1	0	1	0	2	0
14	(Norway)	MF	Ulrik Saltnes	4	0	1	0	5	0
17	(Spain)	DF	José Isidoro	4	0	0	0	4	0
18	(Norway)	DF	Brede Moe	2	0	0	0	2	0
19	(Denmark)	MF	Philip Zinckernagel	4	0	0	0	4	0
20	(Sweden)	FW	Amor Layouni	2	0	0	0	2	0
22	(Norway)	FW	Kristian Opseth	2	0	0	0	2	0
24	(Norway)	DF	Fredrik André Bjørkan	1	0	0	0	1	0
25	(Brazil)	GK	Ricardo	2	0	0	0	2	0
26	(Norway)	MF	Håkon Evjen	2	0	0	0	2	0
Players away on loan:
11	(Norway)	FW	Jens Petter Hauge	1	0	0	0	1	0
Players who left Bodø/Glimt during the season:
12	(Serbia)	GK	Zoran Popović	2	0	0	0	2	0
			TOTALS	40	0	4	0	44	0
