= Casper Øyvann =

Norwegian footballer (born 1999)

Personal information
- Date of birth: 7 December 1999 (age 26)
- Place of birth: Bodø, Norway
- Height: 1.94 m (6 ft 4 in)
- Position: Centre-back

Team information
- Current team: Tromsø
- Number: 25

Youth career
- –2018: Bodø/Glimt

Senior career*
Years	Team	Apps	(Gls)
2015–2019	Bodø/Glimt 2	66	(5)
2018–2019	Bodø/Glimt	0	(0)
2019	→ Mjølner (loan)	8	(0)
2020	Tromsdalen	18	(0)
2021–2023	Tromsø	48	(1)
2021–2022	Tromsø 2	2	(0)
2023–2026	Molde	43	(0)
2025	Molde 2	1	(0)
2026–	Tromsø	5	(0)

International career
2018–2020	Norway futsal	5	(0)
- * Club domestic league appearances and goals as of 21 November 2026

Casper Øyvann (born 7 December 1999) is a Norwegian professional footballer who plays as a centre-back for Eliteserien club Tromsø.

== Club career ==
=== Early career ===
A youth product of Bodø/Glimt, by 2015, Øyvann found himself playing for their second team. When he left the club ahead of the 2020 season, he had played sixty-six games for the second team, while scoring five goals. His first and only game for the first team came in 2018 against Melbo in the 2018 Norwegian Cup.

For the latter half of the 2019 season, Øyvann was loaned out to Mjølner where he played eight games. After Øyvann returned from his loan at Mjølner, the club told him that he wasn't good enough for the first team, and that they were looking at possible loans for him ahead of the 2020 season. No loan deal materialized, and in February 2020 Øyvann was signed by Norwegian Second Division club Tromsdalen on a two-year contract.

Øyvann also played futsal for Hulløy, and was capped five times for the Norwegian national futsal team.

=== Tromsø ===
After one season with Tromsdalen, Øyvann signed a two-year contract with Eliteserien club Tromsø in February 2021. Øyvann admitted that it was weird to sign for the rival of his boyhood club, but that he would fight for his new club. In the first half of the season Øyvann was mostly a substitute at the club. That changed at the end of September in a game against Lillestrøm, and he played most of the matches for the next two seasons. Øyvann signed a new contract with the club in November 2021, lasting until the end of the 2024 season.

=== Molde ===
On 23 August 2023, Øyvann signed a three-and-a-half-year contract with Molde. He got his Molde debut on 3 September 2023 in a 2–1 away win against Haugesund. In December 2023, Øyvann and Molde were crowned Norwegian Cup champions after beating his former club Bodø/Glimt 1–0 in the final. In November 2024, Øyvann tore his ligament in a game against Bodø/Glimt. The first forecast showed that he would miss the rest of the season. However, in January 2025, Øyvann had to undergo surgery, and would miss the first half of the 2025 season as well.

In December 2025, Øyvann faced backlash from the Molde fans as he appeared at the away end at Westfalenstadion in the UEFA Champions League group stage match between Borussia Dortmund and Bodø/Glimt, where he was openly supporting his former club. The leader of Molde's supporter group Tornekrattet said she though Øyvann had embarrassed himself, and expected that he had played his last game for the club. Øyvann later told the media that he was in Germany to support his friends from his time at Bodø/Glimt as well as his father who was part of Bodø/Glimt's staff, and that he had gotten carried away. He further explained that he understood how it looked, but that he was extremely motivated to start a new season at Molde.

=== Return to Tromsø ===
On 28 June 2026 Tromsø announced that they had signed Øyvann on a two-year contract. When signing, Øyvann confirmed that his hamstring was a problem, and that he would not be ready to play the first games for the club.

== Career statistics ==
As of 21 November 2026

Appearances and goals by club, season and competition
Club	Season	League			National Cup		Europe		Total	
Club	Season	Division	Apps	Goals	Apps	Goals	Apps	Goals	Apps	Goals
Bodø/Glimt 2	2015	Norwegian Third Division	1	0	—		—		1	0
Bodø/Glimt 2	2016	Norwegian Third Division	21	1	—		—		21	1
Bodø/Glimt 2	2017	Norwegian Fourth Division	20	1	—		—		20	1
Bodø/Glimt 2	2018	Norwegian Fourth Division	14	3	—		—		14	3
Bodø/Glimt 2	2019	Norwegian Third Division	10	0	—		—		10	0
Bodø/Glimt 2	Total		66	5	—		—		66	5
Bodø/Glimt	2018	Eliteserien	0	0	1	0	—		1	0
Bodø/Glimt	2019	Eliteserien	0	0	0	0	—		0	0
Bodø/Glimt	Total		0	0	1	0	0	0	1	0
Mjølner (loan)	2019	Norwegian Second Division	8	0	0	0	—		8	0
Tromsdalen	2020	Norwegian Second Division	18	0	—		—		18	0
Tromsø	2021	Eliteserien	18	0	2	0	—		20	0
Tromsø	2022	Eliteserien	17	1	1	0	—		18	1
Tromsø	2023	Eliteserien	13	0	2	0	—		15	0
Tromsø	Total		48	1	5	0	0	0	53	1
Tromsø 2	2021	Norwegian Third Division	1	0	—		—		1	0
Tromsø 2	2022	Norwegian Third Division	1	0	—		—		1	0
Tromsø 2	Total		2	0	—		—		2	0
Molde	2023	Eliteserien	10	0	2	0	5 (Note: Appearances in UEFA Europa League)	0	17	0
Molde	2024	Eliteserien	22	0	5	0	10 (Note: Four appearances in UEFA Conference League, six appearances in UEFA Europa League)	0	37	0
Molde	2025	Eliteserien	11	0	0	0	0	0	11	0
Molde	2026	Eliteserien	0	0	0	0	—		0	0
Molde	Total		43	0	7	0	15	0	65	0
Molde 2	2025	Norwegian Third Division	1	0	—		—		1	0
Tromsø	2026	Eliteserien	5	0	0	0	1 (Note: Appearance in UEFA Conference League)	0	6	0
Career total			191	6	13	0	16	0	220	6

== Honours ==
Molde

- Norwegian Cup: 2023
