= Philip Zinckernagel =

Danish footballer (born 1994)

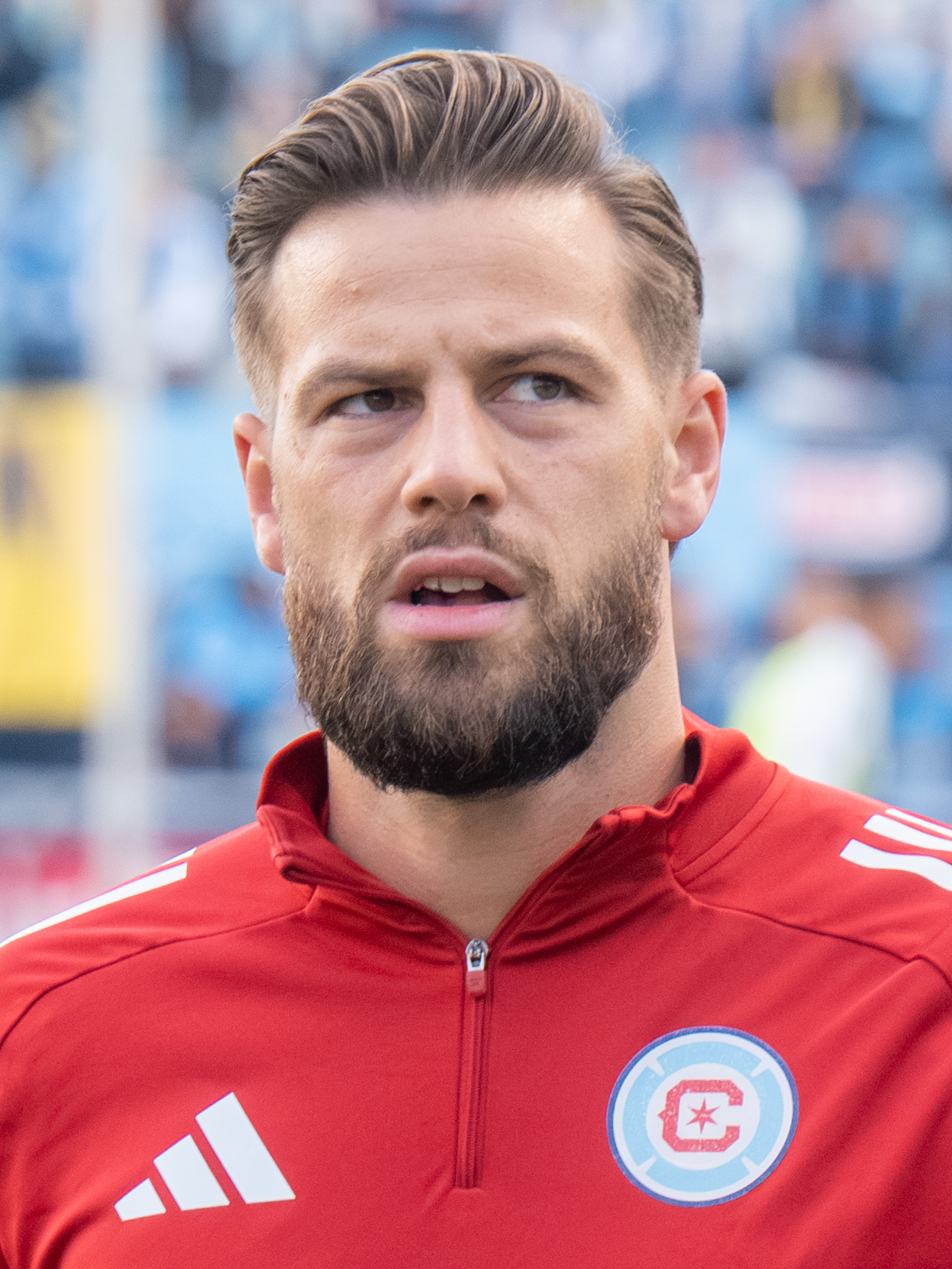
- Zinckernagel with the Chicago Fire in 2025

Personal information
- Full name: Philip Aksel Frigast Zinckernagel
- Date of birth: 16 December 1994 (age 31)
- Place of birth: Copenhagen, Denmark
- Height: 1.75 m (5 ft 9 in)
- Positions: Attacking midfielder; winger; second striker

Team information
- Current team: Chicago Fire
- Number: 11

Youth career
- KB
- –2010: Copenhagen
- 2010–2013: Nordsjælland

Senior career*
Years	Team	Apps	(Gls)
2013–2015	HB Køge	56	(5)
2015–2016	FC Helsingør	29	(5)
2016–2018	SønderjyskE	44	(4)
2018–2020	Bodø/Glimt	82	(31)
2021–2022	Watford	20	(1)
2021–2022	→ Nottingham Forest (loan)	42	(6)
2022–2023	Olympiacos	1	(0)
2022–2023	→ Standard Liège (loan)	27	(10)
2023–2024	Club Brugge	29	(7)
2024	→ Bodø/Glimt (loan)	11	(3)
2025–	Chicago Fire	65	(22)

International career
2011–2012	Denmark U18	2	(0)
2013	Denmark U20	2	(0)
- * Club domestic league appearances and goals as of November 17, 2026

Philip Aksel Frigast Zinckernagel (born 16 December 1994) is a Danish professional footballer who plays as an attacking midfielder for Major League Soccer club Chicago Fire.

== Club career ==
=== Early career ===
In March 2018, Zinckernagel joined Eliteserien side FK Bodø/Glimt from SønderjyskE for €200,000.

Zinckernagel scored 19 goals as FK Bodø/Glimt won their first ever top-flight Norwegian title in 2020. He also scored three goals in the 2020–21 UEFA Europa League qualifying phase before losing to Milan in the third qualifying round.

=== England ===
On 1 January 2021, Zinckernagel signed for English side Watford on a five-and-a-half-year contract. He scored his first goal for Watford in a 6–0 win against Bristol City on 13 February 2021.

On 7 August 2021, Zinckernagel signed on a season-long loan with EFL Championship side Nottingham Forest. He scored his first goal for the club in a 2–1 defeat to Blackburn Rovers on 18 August 2021. On 10 June 2022, Forest announced Zinckernagel would be returning to Watford once his loan expired.

=== Olympiacos ===
On 24 June 2022, Zinckernagel joined Greek champions Olympiacos on a three-year contract for an undisclosed fee.

Zinckernagel made his debut for Olympiacos in a UEFA Champions League second qualifying round tie against Israeli side Maccabi Haifa on 20 July 2022. He scored as the match finished in a 1–1 draw.

Zinckernagel joined Belgian side Standard Liège on loan on transfer deadline day after a falling out with Olympiacos manager Carlos Corberán. Corberan himself was later dismissed of his duties as Olympiacos manager on 18 September 2022.

=== Club Brugge ===
On 1 August 2023, Belgian Pro League side Club Brugge announced the signing of Zinckernagel on a two-year contract, for a reported fee of €2.5 million. On 17 August 2024, he returned to Bodø/Glimt on loan until the end of 2024.

=== Chicago Fire ===
On 6 January 2025, Zinckernagel made the move to Major League Soccer side Chicago Fire on a four-year deal. Due to his strong play for the Fire in 2025, he was named to the MLS All-Star Roster by All-Star head coach Nico Estévez on June 25; he would go on to record an assist in the All-Star game after coming on in the second half. On 19 July 2025, he recorded his tenth assist of the MLS regular season, making him the first Chicago Fire player to ever record ten goals and ten assists in a season, and tying the MLS record of set by Josef Martinez for consecutive road games with a goal contribution (10).

== Career statistics ==
As of match played 1 November 2025

Appearances and goals by club, season and competition
Club	Season	League			National cup (Note: Includes Danish Cup, Norwegian Cup, FA Cup, Greek Cup, Belgian Cup, U.S. Open Cup)		League cup (Note: Includes EFL Cup)		Continental		Other		Total	
Club	Season	Division	Apps	Goals	Apps	Goals	Apps	Goals	Apps	Goals	Apps	Goals	Apps	Goals
Nordsjælland	2012–13	Danish Superliga	0	0	0	0	—		—		—		0	0
HB Køge	2013–14	Danish 1st Division	29	3	0	0	—		—		—		29	3
HB Køge	2014–15	Danish 1st Division	27	2	1	0	—		—		—		28	2
HB Køge	Total		56	5	1	0	—		—		—		57	5
FC Helsingør	2015–16	Danish 1st Division	23	3	1	0	—		—		—		24	3
FC Helsingør	2016–17	Danish 1st Division	6	2	0	0	—		—		—		6	2
FC Helsingør	Total		29	5	1	0	—		—		—		30	5
SønderjyskE	2016–17	Danish Superliga	24	1	1	0	—		—		—		25	1
SønderjyskE	2017–18	Danish Superliga	20	3	1	1	—		—		—		21	4
SønderjyskE	Total		44	4	2	1	—		—		—		46	5
Bodø/Glimt	2018	Eliteserien	24	6	3	1	—		—		—		27	7
Bodø/Glimt	2019	Eliteserien	30	6	1	0	—		—		—		31	6
Bodø/Glimt	2020	Eliteserien	28	19	—		—		3 (Note: Appearances in UEFA Europa League)	3	—		31	22
Bodø/Glimt	Total		82	31	4	1	—		3	3	—		89	35
Watford	2020–21	Championship	20	1	0	0	1	0	—		—		21	1
Nottingham Forest (loan)	2021–22	Championship	42	6	4	1	1	0	—		3 (Note: Appearances in EFL Championship play-offs)	0	50	7
Olympiacos	2022–23	Super League Greece	1	0	0	0	—		6 (Note: Appearances in UEFA Champions League)	2	—		7	2
Standard Liège (loan)	2022–23	Belgian Pro League	24	9	1	0	—		—		—		25	9
Club Brugge	2023–24	Belgian Pro League	29	7	2	0	—		12 (Note: Appearances in UEFA Europa Conference League)	0	—		41	7
Club Brugge	2024–25	Belgian Pro League	0	0	0	0	—		0	0	—		0	0
Club Brugge	Total		29	7	2	0	—		12	0	—		41	7
Bodø/Glimt (loan)	2024	Eliteserien	11	3	0	0	—		8	2	—		19	5
Chicago Fire	2025	MLS	34	15	2	1	—		—		—		36	16
Career total			372	86	17	4	2	0	29	7	3	0	423	97

== Honours ==
Bodø/Glimt

- Eliteserien: 2020, 2024

Nottingham Forest

- EFL Championship play-offs: 2022

Club Brugge

- Belgian Pro League: 2023–24

Individual

- Eliteserien Player of the Year: 2020
- Eliteserien Top assist provider: 2020
- MLS All-Star: 2025, 2026
