= Pedrera, Seville =

Pedrera, Spain
- city
- Flag Coat of arms
- Interactive map of Pedrera, Spain
- Coordinates: 37°13′N 4°53′W
- Country: Spain
- Province: Seville
- Municipality: Pedrera

Area
  - Total: 60 km^{2} (23 sq mi)
- Elevation: 460 m (1,510 ft)

Population (2025-01-01)
  - Total: 5,057
  - Density: 84/km^{2} (220/sq mi)
- Time zone: UTC+1 (CET)
  - Summer (DST): UTC+2 (CEST)

Pedrera is a city located in the province of Seville, Spain. According to the 2005 census (INE), the city has a population of 5143 inhabitants.

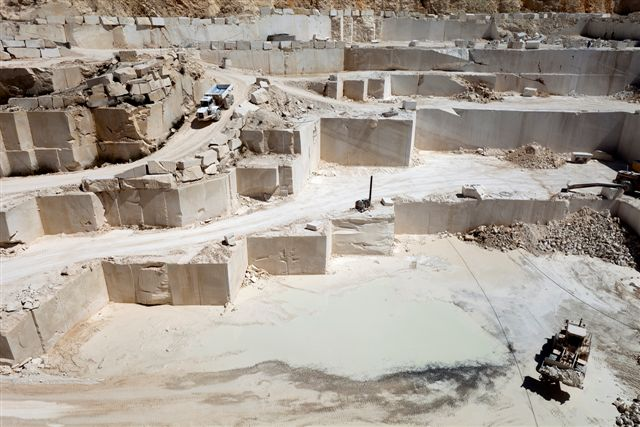
Matagallar quarry in Pedrera, Seville, Spain

== See also ==
- List of municipalities in Seville
