= José Isidoro =

Spanish footballer and manager

Isidoro
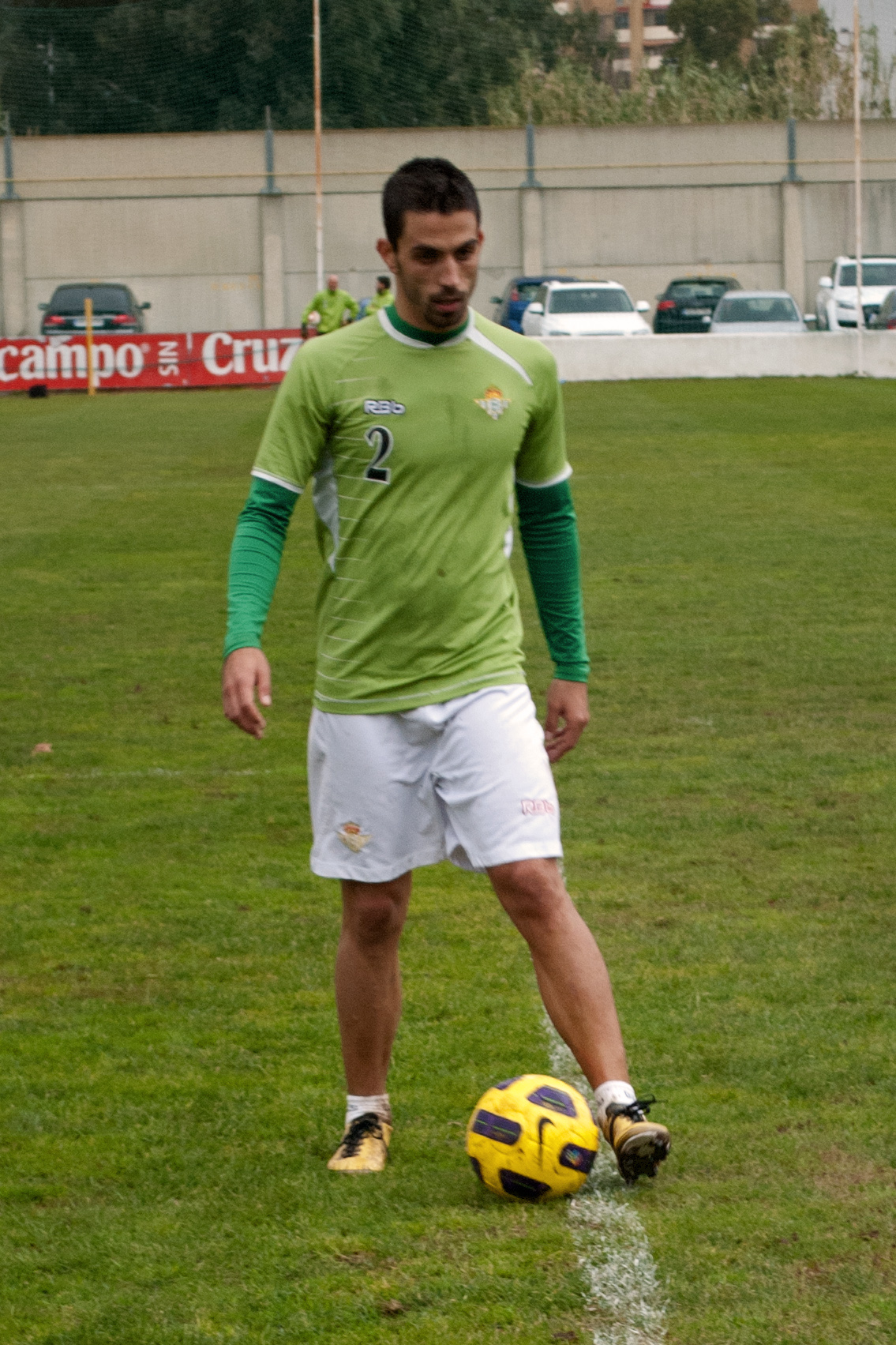
- Isidoro training with Betis in 2010

Personal information
- Full name: José Isidoro Gómez Torres
- Date of birth: 1 August 1986 (age 40)
- Place of birth: Pedrera, Spain
- Height: 1.80 m (5 ft 11 in)
- Position: Right-back

Youth career
- Betis

Senior career*
Years	Team	Apps	(Gls)
2005–2010	Betis B	140	(4)
2006–2012	Betis	50	(0)
2012	Polonia Warsaw	4	(0)
2013–2015	Numancia	60	(0)
2015–2016	Elche	24	(0)
2016–2017	Almería	9	(0)
2018–2019	Bodø/Glimt	24	(0)
Total		311	(4)

Managerial career
- 2020–2022: Junkeren (assistant)
- 2022: NFF Nordland
- 2023: Gerena
- * Club domestic league appearances and goals

José Isidoro Gómez Torres (born 1 August 1986), known simply as Isidoro, is a Spanish former professional footballer. Mainly a right-back, he could play occasionally on the other flank. He also worked as a manager.

== Playing career ==
A product of Real Betis' youth system, Isidoro was born in Pedrera, Seville, and he made his first appearance with the first team in a 1–1 draw with Real Madrid at the Santiago Bernabéu in a Copa del Rey game, with Betis winning the tie on the away goals rule. Under the guidance of manager Luis Fernández, he played six consecutive La Liga matches (all starts) after his debut on 17 February 2007, also against Real Madrid and away (0–0 draw); he was promoted to the main squad at the same time as Juande, but remained registered with the reserves for a further three full seasons.

Isidoro appeared in 31 games for the Andalusians in the 2010–11 campaign, as they returned to the top division after a two-year absence. He moved abroad on 27 August 2012, signing a two-year contract with Polish club Polonia Warsaw; he was released on 25 November, after only five official appearances.

In the following years, Isidoro competed in his country's second tier, in representation of CD Numancia, Elche CF and UD Almería. In January 2018, he joined FK Bodø/Glimt from the Norwegian Eliteserien.

== Coaching career ==
Isidoro retired at the end of 2019 aged 33, being immediately appointed assistant manager of Bodø/Glimt's lowly neighbours IK Junkeren. He also worked at their academy.

== Career statistics ==
Appearances and goals by club, season and competition
Club	Season	League			National Cup		Europe		Total	
Club	Season	Division	Apps	Goals	Apps	Goals	Apps	Goals	Apps	Goals
Betis	2006–07	La Liga	8	0	0	0	—		8	0
Betis	2007–08	La Liga	0	0	0	0	—		0	0
Betis	2008–09	La Liga	0	0	0	0	—		0	0
Betis	2010–11	Segunda División	31	0	7	0	—		38	0
Betis	2011–12	La Liga	11	0	0	0	—		11	0
Betis	Total		50	0	7	0	—		57	0
Polonia Warsaw	2012–13	Ekstraklasa	4	0	1	0	—		5	0
Numancia	2012–13	Segunda División	8	0	0	0	—		8	0
Numancia	2013–14	Segunda División	17	0	0	0	—		17	0
Numancia	2014–15	Segunda División	35	0	2	0	—		37	0
Numancia	Total		60	0	2	0	—		62	0
Elche	2015–16	Segunda División	24	0	1	0	—		25	0
Almería	2016–17	Segunda División	9	0	1	0	—		10	0
Bodø/Glimt	2018	Eliteserien	21	0	3	0	—		24	0
Bodø/Glimt	2019	Eliteserien	3	0	2	1	—		5	1
Bodø/Glimt	Total		24	0	5	1	—		29	1
Career total			171	0	17	1	—		188	1
