= Ask Tjærandsen-Skau =

Norwegian footballer (born 2001)

Personal information
- Full name: Ask Tjærandsen-Skau
- Date of birth: 14 January 2001 (age 25)
- Place of birth: Bodø, Norway
- Height: 1.82 m (5 ft 11 1/2 in)
- Position: Midfielder

Team information
- Current team: Junkeren

Youth career
- –2014: Grand Bodø
- 2015–2019: Bodø/Glimt

Senior career*
Years	Team	Apps	(Gls)
2018–2024	Bodø/Glimt	5	(0)
2020	→ Stjørdals-Blink (loan)	11	(2)
2021	→ Stjørdals-Blink (loan)	11	(1)
2021	→ Start (loan)	9	(0)
2022	→ Jerv (loan)	10	(1)
2024–	Junkeren	0	(0)

International career^{‡}
2019	Norway U18	1	(0)
- * Club domestic league appearances and goals as of 2 July 2023 ‡ National team caps and goals as of 25 May 2023

Ask Tjærandsen-Skau (born 14 January 2001) is a Norwegian footballer who plays as a midfielder for Junkeren.

== Club career ==
Tjærandsen-Skau was born in Bodø Municipality. He made his senior debut for Bodø/Glimt on 22 August 2020 against Start; Bodø/Glimt won 6–0.

In October 2020 Tjærandsen-Skau was loaned out to 1. divisjons club Stjørdals-Blink for the rest off the season. Before the 2021 season Tjærandsen-Skau was loaned out to Stjørdals-Blink for the rest of the season.

== Career statistics ==
As of match played 16 October 2022

Appearances and goals by club, season and competition
Club	Season	League			National Cup		Continental		Total	
Club	Season	Division	Apps	Goals	Apps	Goals	Apps	Goals	Apps	Goals
Bodø/Glimt	2018	Eliteserien	0	0	1	0	-		1	0
Bodø/Glimt	2019	Eliteserien	0	0	1	0	-		1	0
Bodø/Glimt	2020	Eliteserien	1	0	0	0	-		1	0
Bodø/Glimt	2022	Eliteserien	4	0	2	0	3	0	9	0
Bodø/Glimt	Total		5	0	4	0	3	0	12	0
Stjørdals-Blink (loan)	2020	1. divisjon	10	2	0	0	-		10	2
Stjørdals-Blink (loan)	2021	1. divisjon	11	1	1	0	-		12	1
Stjørdals-Blink (loan)	Total		21	3	1	0	-	-	22	3
Start (loan)	2021	1. divisjon	9	0	0	0	-		9	0
Jerv (loan)	2022	Eliteserien	5	1	0	0	-		5	1
Career total			40	4	5	0	3	0	48	4
