= Amadou Konaté =

Malian footballer (born 1997)

Personal information
- Date of birth: 1 January 1997 (age 29)
- Place of birth: Bamako, Mali
- Height: 1.85 m (6 ft 1 in)
- Position: Forward

Team information
- Current team: Châteauroux
- Number: 11

Youth career
- Viry-Châtillon

Senior career*
| Years | Team | Apps | (Gls) |
| 2016–2017 | Tours II | 12 | (3) |
| 2017–2018 | Valenciennes | 1 | (0) |
| 2018–2019 | Boulogne | 24 | (5) |
| 2019–2020 | Bodø/Glimt | 4 | (0) |
| 2020 | → Lyon-Duchère (loan) | 2 | (0) |
| 2020–2021 | Cholet | 19 | (4) |
| 2021–2022 | Sète | 10 | (0) |
| 2022–2023 | Poissy | 30 | (14) |
| 2023–2025 | Créteil-Lusitanos | 44 | (19) |
| 2025– | Châteauroux | 12 | (1) |
- * Club domestic league appearances and goals as of 23 June 2026

Amadou Konaté (born 1 January 1997) is a Malian professional footballer who plays as a forward for Championnat National 1 club Châteauroux.

== Club career ==
Konaté made his professional debut with Valenciennes in a 2–1 Ligue 2 loss to Châteauroux on 12 January 2018, wherein he was subbed on in the last minute of the game. On 29 March 2019 Konaté signed for Norwegian club Bodø/Glimt on a four-year contract. In January 2020, having made only four appearances for the Norwegian side, he was loaned back to France, to Championnat National side Lyon-Duchère until the end of 2019–20 season. Due to the premature end of the season, he only made two appearances with Lyon Duchère before signing with another Championnat National side Cholet in August 2020.

On 10 July 2022, Konaté signed with Poissy in Championnat National 2. In June 2023, Konaté joined Créteil-Lusitanos. In July 2025, he signed for Châteauroux.

== Personal life ==
Born in Bamako, Mali, Konaté has French and Malian citizenship.

== Career statistics ==
As of match played 5 November 2021

Appearances and goals by club, season and competition
| Club | Season | League | | | National Cup | | Total | |
| Club | Season | Division | Apps | Goals | Apps | Goals | Apps | Goals |
|---|---|---|---|---|---|---|---|---|
| Tours II | 2016–17 | National 3 | 12 | 3 | 0 | 0 | 12 | 3 |
| Valenciennes | 2017–18 | Ligue 2 | 1 | 0 | 0 | 0 | 1 | 0 |
| Boulogne | 2018–19 | Championnat National | 24 | 5 | 0 | 0 | 24 | 5 |
| Bodø/Glimt | 2019 | Eliteserien | 4 | 0 | 1 | 3 | 5 | 3 |
| Lyon-Duchère (loan) | 2019–20 | Championnat National | 2 | 0 | 0 | 0 | 2 | 0 |
| Cholet | 2020–21 | Championnat National | 19 | 4 | 0 | 0 | 19 | 4 |
| Sète | 2021–22 | Championnat National | 10 | 0 | 0 | 0 | 10 | 0 |
| Career total | | | 72 | 12 | 1 | 3 | 73 | 15 |
