= Amor Layouni =

Tunisian footballer

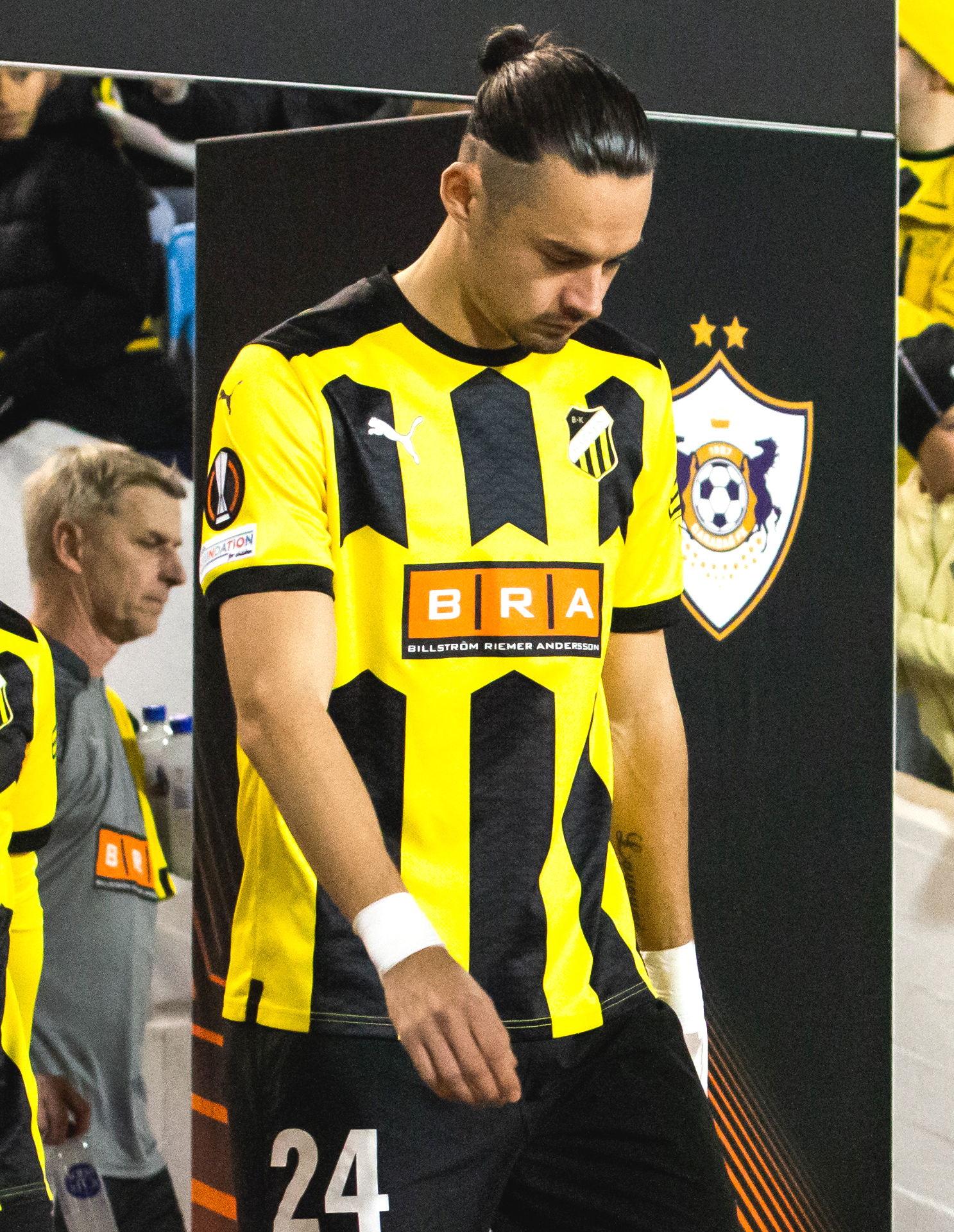

Personal information
- Full name: Amor Yonas Layouni
- Date of birth: 3 October 1992 (age 34)
- Place of birth: Sweden
- Height: 1.91 m (6 ft 3 in)
- Positions: Forward; left winger

Team information
- Current team: AEK Larnaca
- Number: 14

Senior career*
Years	Team	Apps	(Gls)
2011–2012	Falu	30	(20)
2013–2015	Brage	59	(13)
2016	Degerfors	25	(4)
2017	Elverum	14	(3)
2017–2019	Bodø/Glimt	60	(15)
2019–2021	Pyramids	16	(2)
2021–2023	Vålerenga	48	(11)
2023	→ Western Sydney Wanderers (loan)	11	(4)
2023–2026	Häcken	63	(17)
2026–	AEK Larnaca	9	(2)

International career^{‡}
2019–	Tunisia	10	(1)
- * Club domestic league appearances and goals as of 7 November 2026 ‡ National team caps and goals as of 8 September 2025 (UTC)

Amor Yonas Layouni (Arabic: عمر وناس العيوني; born 3 October 1992) is a professional footballer who plays as a forward or left winger for Cypriot club AEK Larnaca. Born in Sweden, he represents the Tunisia national team.

== Club career ==
Layouni was born in Sweden. He made his senior debut for Elverum on 9 April 2017 against Tromsdalen; Elverum draw 1–1. He signed for Eliteserien side Bodø/Glimt in the summer on 2017. On 17 September 2019 Layouni signed for Egyptian side Pyramids FC on a three-year contract.

On his debut for the Western Sydney Wanderers, Layouni scored the equalizer in the 5th minute of extra time to end the game at 4–4 against Adelaide United.

== International career ==
Layouni was born in Sweden to a Tunisian father and Swedish mother. He debuted for the Tunisia national team in a 1–0 friendly win over Mauritania on 6 September 2019, scoring the game-winning goal. He was called up back to the Tunisia national team by head coach Jalel Kadri for their 2 friendly matches against Libya on 16 March 2023.

== Career statistics ==
=== Club ===
As of match played 31 May 2026

Appearances and goals by club, season and competition
Club	Season	League			National Cup		Continental		Total	
Club	Season	Division	Apps	Goals	Apps	Goals	Apps	Goals	Apps	Goals
Brage	2013	Superettan	14	0	1	0	—		15	0
Brage	2014	Division 1	22	5	0	0	—		22	5
Brage	2015	Division 1	23	8	2	0	—		25	8
Brage	Total		59	13	3	0	0	0	62	13
Degerfors	2016	Superettan	25	4	3	0	—		28	4
Elverum	2017	OBOS-ligaen	14	3	2	2	—		16	5
Bodø/Glimt	2017	OBOS-ligaen	9	2	0	0	—		9	2
Bodø/Glimt	2018	Eliteserien	30	3	3	0	—		33	3
Bodø/Glimt	2019	Eliteserien	21	10	0	0	—		21	10
Bodø/Glimt	Total		60	15	3	0	0	0	63	15
Pyramids	2019–20	Egyptian Premier League	16	2	0	0	4	1	20	3
Pyramids	2020–21	Egyptian Premier League	0	0	0	0	0	0	0	0
Pyramids	Total		16	2	0	0	4	1	20	3
Vålerenga	2021	Eliteserien	28	3	1	0	1	0	30	3
Vålerenga	2022	Eliteserien	20	8	2	0	0	0	22	8
Vålerenga	Total		48	11	3	0	1	0	52	11
Western Sydney Wanderers (loan)	2022–23	A-League Men	11	4	0	0	0	0	11	4
Häcken	2023	Allsvenskan	14	5	2	0	12	3	28	8
Häcken	2024	Allsvenskan	19	6	4	1	5	4	28	11
Häcken	2025	Allsvenskan	21	5	1	0	13	0	35	5
Häcken	2026	Allsvenskan	9	1	0	0	0	0	9	1
Häcken	Total		63	17	7	1	30	7	100	25
AEK Larnaca	2026–27	Cypriot First Division	0	0	0	0	0	0	0	0
Career total			296	69	21	3	35	8	352	80

Scores and results list Tunisia's goal tally first.

=== International Goals ===
No.	Date	Venue	Opponent	Score	Result	Competition
1	6 September 2019	Stade Olympique de Radès, Radès, Tunisia	Mauritania	1–0	1–0	Friendly
2	4 December 2025	Lusail Stadium, Lusail, Qatar	Palestine	1–0	2–2	2025 FIFA Arab Cup
