= Thomas Jacobsen (footballer) =

Norwegian footballer (born 1983)

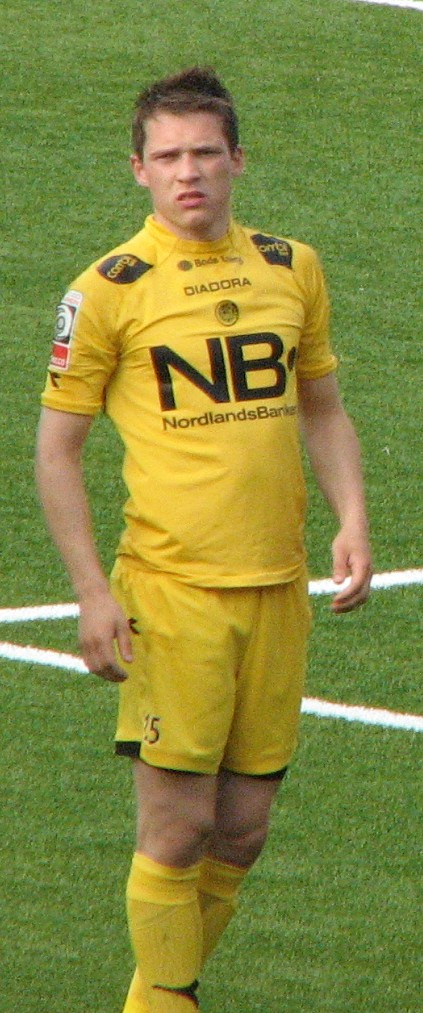
- Jacobsen in 2007

Personal information
- Date of birth: 16 September 1983 (age 43)
- Place of birth: Bodø, Norway
- Height: 1.78 m (5 ft 10 in)
- Position: Defender

Senior career*
Years	Team	Apps	(Gls)
2006–2008	Bodø/Glimt	53	(1)
2009–2010	Lyn	18	(0)
2010–2018	Bodø/Glimt	205	(4)
- * Club domestic league appearances and goals as of 24 November 2018

Thomas Jacobsen (born 16 September 1983) is a Norwegian footballer, most recently playing for Bodø/Glimt in the Eliteserien.

== Career ==
He transferred to Lyn from Bodø/Glimt before the 2009 season.

== Career statistics ==
=== Club ===
As of match played 24 November 2018

Appearances and goals by club, season and competition
Club	Season	League			National Cup		Continental		Other		Total	
Club	Season	Division	Apps	Goals	Apps	Goals	Apps	Goals	Apps	Goals	Apps	Goals
Bodø/Glimt	2006	Adeccoligaen	25	0	2	0	-		-		27	0
Bodø/Glimt	2007	Adeccoligaen	26	1	2	0	-		-		28	1
Bodø/Glimt	2008	Tippeligaen	2	0	3	0	-		-		5	0
Bodø/Glimt	Total		53	1	7	0	-	-	-	-	60	1
Lyn	2009	Tippeligaen	8	0	2	0	-		-		10	0
Lyn	2010	Adeccoligaen	10	0	1	0	-		-		11	0
Lyn	Total		18	0	3	0	-	-	-	-	21	0
Bodø/Glimt	2010	Adeccoligaen	8	0	0	0	-		-		8	0
Bodø/Glimt	2011	Adeccoligaen	27	1	3	0	-		-		30	1
Bodø/Glimt	2012	Adeccoligaen	29	0	3	0	-		-		32	0
Bodø/Glimt	2013	Adeccoligaen	23	3	5	0	-		-		28	3
Bodø/Glimt	2014	Tippeligaen	27	0	4	0	-		-		31	0
Bodø/Glimt	2015	Tippeligaen	28	0	3	0	-		-		31	0
Bodø/Glimt	2016	Tippeligaen	28	0	5	0	-		-		33	0
Bodø/Glimt	2017	OBOS-ligaen	19	0	1	0	-		-		20	0
Bodø/Glimt	2018	Eliteserien	16	0	0	0	-		-		16	0
Bodø/Glimt	Total		205	4	24	0	-	-	-	-	229	4
Career total			276	5	34	0	-	-	-	-	310	5
