= Morten Konradsen =

Norwegian footballer (born 1996)

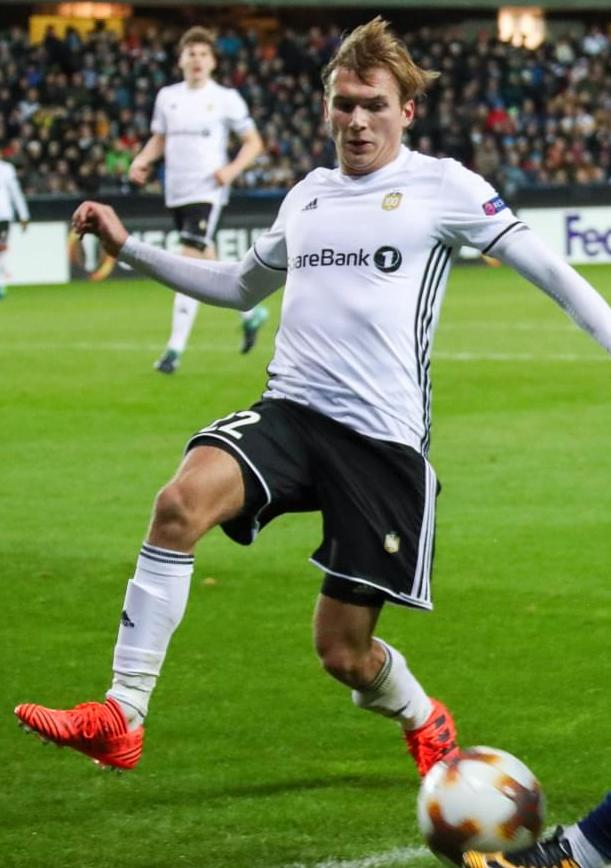
- Konradsen in 2017

Personal information
- Full name: Morten Ågnes Konradsen
- Date of birth: 3 May 1996 (age 30)
- Place of birth: Bodø, Norway
- Height: 1.76 m (5 ft 9 in)
- Position: Midfielder

Youth career
- –2012: Bodø/Glimt

Senior career*
Years	Team	Apps	(Gls)
2012–2017	Bodø/Glimt	65	(5)
2017–2018	Rosenborg	5	(0)
2018–2023	Bodø/Glimt	63	(3)
2024–2025	Haugesund	37	(2)
2025	Ranheim	4	(0)

International career^{‡}
2011	Norway U15	4	(1)
2012	Norway U16	14	(2)
2013	Norway U17	3	(1)
2014	Norway U18	7	(1)
2014–2015	Norway U19	5	(1)
2015	Norway U21	1	(0)
- * Club domestic league appearances and goals as of 2 November 2025 ‡ National team caps and goals as of 31 July 2017

Morten Ågnes Konradsen (born 3 May 1996) is a former Norwegian professional footballer.

== Career ==
Konradsen is a younger brother of fellow footballer Anders Ågnes Konradsen. He made his senior debut for Bodø/Glimt in the first round of the 2012 Norwegian Football Cup, and scored a goal. He played eleven games in the 2013 Norwegian First Division, and made his first-tier debut in April 2014 against Sogndal.

In August 2017, Morten joined Rosenborg, which meant he teamed up with his brother Anders Konradsen. In 2018 Konradsen returned to Bodø/Glimt.

== Career statistics ==
=== Club ===
As of match played 20 September 2025

Appearances and goals by club, season and competition
Club	Season	League			National Cup		Continental		Other		Total	
Club	Season	Division	Apps	Goals	Apps	Goals	Apps	Goals	Apps	Goals	Apps	Goals
Bodø/Glimt	2012	1. divisjon	0	0	1	1	–		–		1	1
Bodø/Glimt	2013	1. divisjon	10	0	2	1	–		–		12	1
Bodø/Glimt	2014	Eliteserien	16	1	4	1	–		–		20	2
Bodø/Glimt	2015	Eliteserien	27	4	2	1	–		–		29	5
Bodø/Glimt	2016	Eliteserien	12	0	1	0	–		–		13	0
Bodø/Glimt	2017	1. divisjon	0	0	2	0	–		–		2	0
Bodø/Glimt	Total		65	5	12	4	0	0	0	0	77	9
Rosenborg	2017	Eliteserien	4	0	0	0	2	0	–		6	0
Rosenborg	2018	Eliteserien	1	0	3	0	–		1	0	5	0
Rosenborg	Total		5	0	3	0	2	0	1	0	11	0
Bodø/Glimt	2018	Eliteserien	4	0	0	0	–		–		4	0
Bodø/Glimt	2019	Eliteserien	23	2	1	0	–		–		24	2
Bodø/Glimt	2020	Eliteserien	10	1	0	0	2	0	–		12	1
Bodø/Glimt	2021	Eliteserien	19	0	3	0	10	0	–		32	0
Bodø/Glimt	2022	Eliteserien	4	0	0	0	4	0	–		8	0
Bodø/Glimt	2023	Eliteserien	3	0	5	0	1	0	–		9	0
Bodø/Glimt	Total		63	3	9	0	17	0	0	0	89	3
Haugesund	2024	Eliteserien	21	2	0	0	–		2	0	23	2
Haugesund	2025	Eliteserien	16	0	1	0	–		–		17	0
Haugesund	Total		37	2	1	0	0	0	2	0	40	2
Ranheim	2025	OBOS-ligaen	4	0	0	0	–		–		4	0
Ranheim	Total		4	0	0	0	0	0	0	0	4	0
Career total			174	10	25	4	19	0	3	0	221	14

== Honours ==
Rosenborg

- Eliteserien: 2017
- Mesterfinalen: 2018

Bodø/Glimt

- Eliteserien: 2020, 2021
