= José Ángel (footballer, born 1992) =

Spanish footballer

Personal information
- Full name: José Ángel Jurado de la Torre
- Date of birth: 21 June 1992 (age 34)
- Place of birth: Seville, Spain
- Height: 1.82 m (6 ft 0 in)
- Position: Central midfielder

Youth career
- Betis

Senior career*
Years	Team	Apps	(Gls)
2010–2011	Betis B	23	(1)
2011–2014	Villarreal B	53	(4)
2011–2012	→ Mirandés (loan)	21	(0)
2014–2015	Almería B	35	(1)
2014–2017	Almería	37	(1)
2017–2019	Bodø/Glimt	50	(1)
2019	→ Sheriff (loan)	13	(2)
2019–2021	Cartagena	48	(2)
2021–2022	Al Wahda	10	(0)
2022	Alcorcón	17	(1)
2022–2023	Tenerife	27	(1)
2023–2026	Deportivo A Coruña	85	(1)
- * Club domestic league appearances and goals as of 08:55, 24 June 2026 (UTC)

José Ángel Jurado de la Torre (born 21 June 1992), known as José Ángel, is a Spanish professional footballer who plays as a central midfielder.

== Club career ==
Born in Seville, Andalusia, José Ángel graduated from Real Betis' youth setup, and made his senior debut with their reserves in the 2010–11 season, in the Segunda División B. In July 2011 he joined another reserve team, Villarreal CF B, and was immediately loaned to CD Mirandés in the same league.

José Ángel returned to the Yellow Submarine in June 2012 after winning promotion with the Castile and León club, and appeared regularly over two seasons. On 14 July 2014, he moved to UD Almería, being assigned to the B side also in the third division.

José Ángel played his first match as a professional on 5 December 2014, coming on as a substitute for Corona in the 67th minute of a 4–3 away win against Real Betis in the round of 32 of the Copa del Rey. On 14 June 2015, he was promoted to the main squad, now in the Segunda División.

José Ángel made his debut in division two on 23 August 2015, replacing Mohammed Fatau in a 3–2 home victory over CD Leganés. He scored his first professional goal on 27 March of the following year, the equaliser in a 1–1 draw to RCD Mallorca also at the Estadio de los Juegos Mediterráneos.

On 31 January 2017, José Ángel's contract – which was due to expire in the end of the campaign – was terminated by the club. On 17 March, he moved abroad for the first time in his career after signing a one-year deal at FK Bodø/Glimt in the Norwegian First Division.

On 15 February 2019, José Ángel joined Moldovan National Division side FC Sheriff Tiraspol on loan. He returned to his country on 27 August, with third-tier FC Cartagena.

A backup to Adalberto Carrasquilla and Miguel Ángel Cordero in his first season as Efesé achieved promotion, José Ángel subsequently became first choice and helped the club to avoid relegation in the second. On 8 July 2021, he renewed his contract for a further year, but was transferred to Emirati club Al Wahda FC fifteen days later.

José Ángel returned to Cartagena on 12 January 2022, after agreeing to a deal until the end of the campaign. Three days later, however, he departed by mutual agreement as they were unable to register him, and on 16 January he signed with AD Alcorcón until 30 June.

On 3 July 2022, José Ángel joined CD Tenerife still in the second division on a two-year contract. One year later, he moved to Primera Federación team Deportivo de La Coruña on a two-year deal.

On 1 September 2026, after helping Dépor to achieve promotion to La Liga, José Ángel terminated his link with the club.

== Career statistics ==
As of match played 30 May 2021

Appearances and goals by club, season and competition
Club	Season	League			National cup		Continental		Other		Total	
Club	Season	Division	Apps	Goals	Apps	Goals	Apps	Goals	Apps	Goals	Apps	Goals
Betis B	2010–11	Segunda División B	23	1	—		—		—		23	1
Mirandés (loan)	2011–12	Segunda División B	21	0	2	0	—		1 (Note: Appearances in Segunda División B play-offs)	0	24	0
Villarreal B	2012–13	Segunda División B	23	3	—		—		—		23	3
Villarreal B	2013–14	Segunda División B	30	1	—		—		—		30	1
Villarreal B	Total		53	4	—		—		—		53	4
Almería B	2014–15	Segunda División B	35	1	—		—		2	0	37	1
Almería	2014–15	La Liga	0	0	2	0	—		—		2	0
Almería	2015–16	Segunda División	25	1	3	0	—		—		28	1
Almería	2016–17	Segunda División	12	0	1	0	—		—		13	0
Almería	Total		37	1	6	0	—		—		43	1
Bodø/Glimt	2017	First Division	22	0	3	1	—		—		25	1
Bodø/Glimt	2018	Eliteserien	28	1	2	0	—		—		30	1
Bodø/Glimt	Total		50	1	5	1	—		—		55	2
Sheriff (loan)	2019	National Division	13	2	2	0	1 (Note: Appearance in UEFA Champions League)	0	—		16	2
Cartagena	2019–20	Segunda División B	15	0	2	1	—		1	0	18	1
Cartagena	2020–21	Segunda División	33	2	0	0	—		—		33	2
Cartagena	Total		48	2	2	1	—		1	0	51	3
Career total			280	12	17	2	1	0	4	0	302	14
