= Thomas Drage =

Norwegian footballer (born 1992)

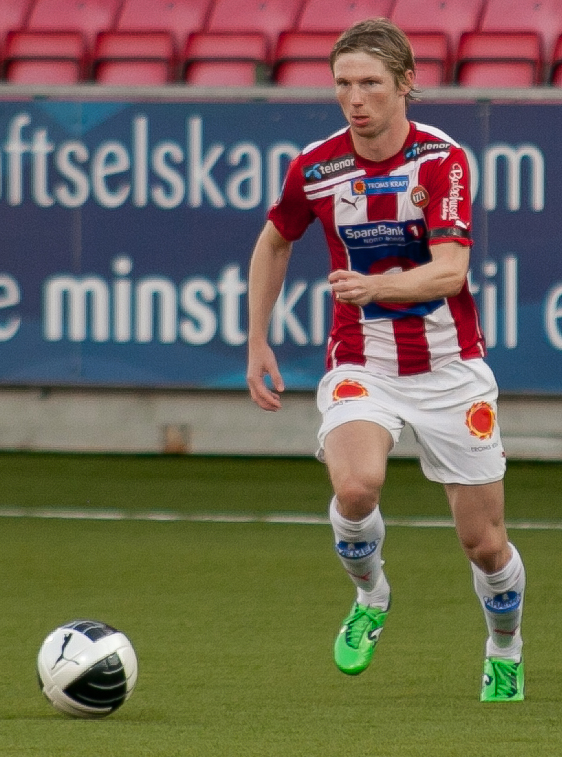

Personal information
- Full name: Thomas Alfred Jonas Drage
- Date of birth: 20 February 1992 (age 34)
- Place of birth: Mosjøen, Norway
- Height: 1.75 m (5 ft 9 in)
- Position: Midfielder

Team information
- Current team: Europa Point
- Number: 7

Youth career
- Mosjøen

Senior career*
Years	Team	Apps	(Gls)
2010–2015	Tromsø	136	(10)
2015	Sogndal	13	(1)
2016	Varberg	12	(4)
2016–2017	Falkenberg	12	(0)
2017–2018	Bodø/Glimt	33	(3)
2019–2023	Fredrikstad	101	(8)
2023–	Europa Point	49	(2)
2025	→ Mosjøen (loan)	–	(–)

International career
2008	Norway U16	4	(0)
2009	Norway U17	5	(1)
2010	Norway U18	7	(0)
2011	Norway U19	7	(0)
2012–2013	Norway U21	5	(1)
2012	Norway	1	(0)
- * Club domestic league appearances and goals as of 13 December 2025

Thomas Drage (born 20 February 1992) is a Norwegian football player who plays for 4. divisjon side Mosjøen.

Drage's breakout season came in 2011. He led his team in assists, contributing 11 of them, placing him as runner-up behind Strømsgodset's Øyvind Storflor (at 12) on the list of most assists in the league. Drage was also named Tromsø's player of the year. The award, Årets Isbjørn (Polar Bear of the Year), is handed out annually by Tromsø's supporters and decided through a fan poll. Drage received 52.2% of the votes. Thanks to his fine play, Drage was rewarded with a salary increase and a new four-year contract with Tromsø at the end of the 2011 season. In 2019 he joined Fredrikstad

He won his first cap for Norway on 18 January 2012 at the 2012 King's Cup. He came on as a substitute against Thailand, replacing Tarik Elyounoussi at half-time. Norway won the match 1–0.

== Career statistics ==
As of 12 June 2021

Season	Club	Division	League		Cup		Europe		Total	
Season	Club	Division	Apps	Goals	Apps	Goals	Apps	Goals	Apps	Goals
2010	Tromsø	Eliteserien	16	1	4	0	–		20	1
2011	Tromsø	Eliteserien	30	4	3	1	4	0	37	5
2012	Tromsø	Eliteserien	30	2	7	1	6	0	43	3
2013	Tromsø	Eliteserien	22	1	4	1	14	0	40	2
2014	Tromsø	1. divisjon	29	2	3	0	4	2	36	4
2015	Tromsø	Eliteserien	9	0	2	0	-	-	11	0
2015	Sogndal	1. divisjon	13	1	0	0	–		13	1
2016	Varbergs BoIS	Superettan	12	4	0	0	–		12	4
2016	Falkenbergs FF	Allsvenskan	12	0	1	1	–		13	1
2017	Bodø/Glimt	1. divisjon	21	3	0	0	–		21	3
2018	Bodø/Glimt	Eliteserien	12	0	3	1	–		15	1
2019	Fredrikstad	2. divisjon	22	0	2	0	–		24	0
2020	Fredrikstad	2. divisjon	13	2	–		–		13	2
2021	Fredrikstad	1. divisjon	5	1	0	0	–		5	1
Career Total			246	21	29	5	28	2	303	28
