= Vegard Leikvoll Moberg =

Norwegian footballer (born 1991)

Vegard Moberg
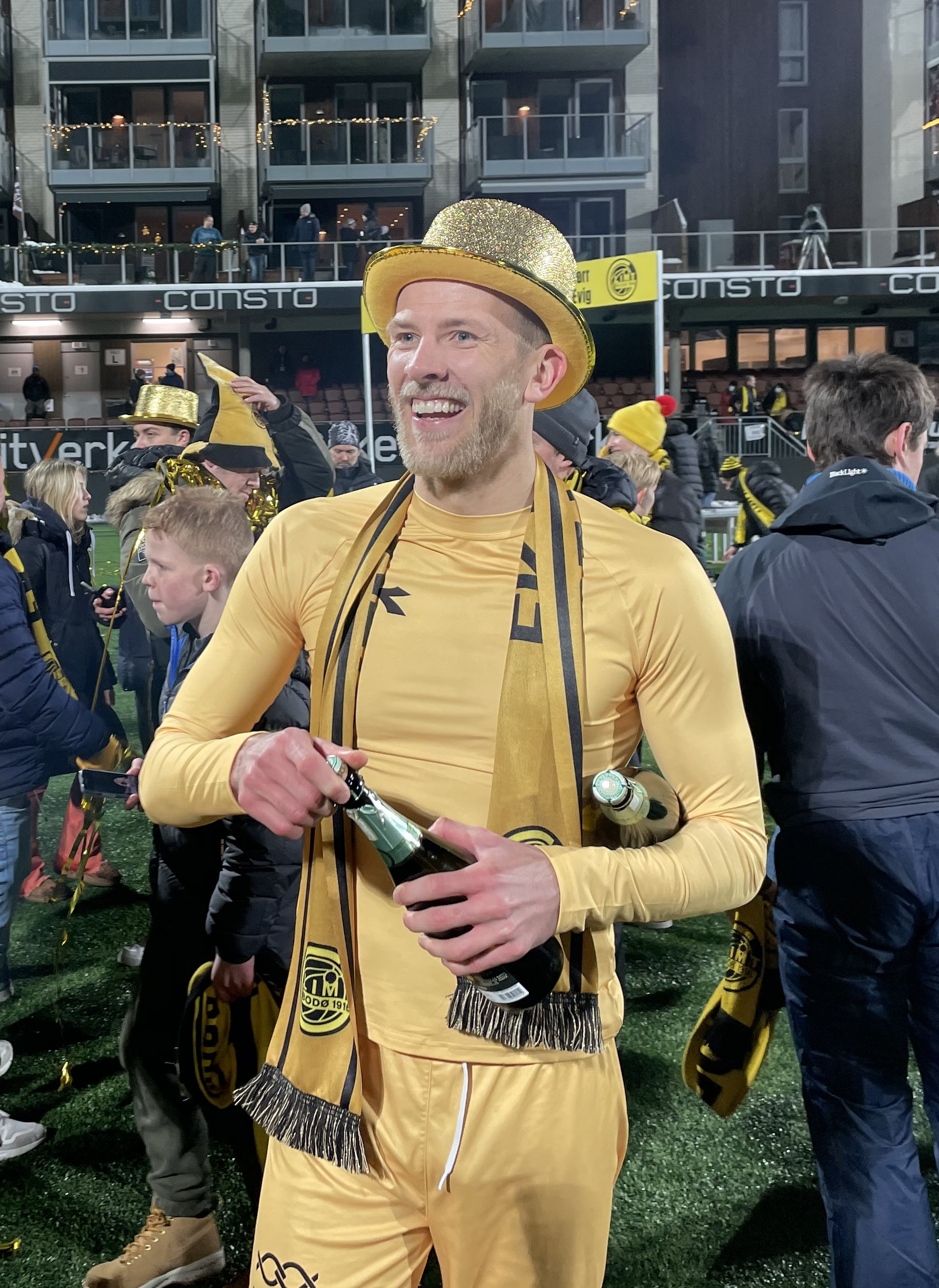

Personal information
- Full name: Vegard Leikvoll Moberg
- Date of birth: 23 January 1991 (age 35)
- Place of birth: Åsane, Norway
- Height: 1.90 m (6 ft 3 in)
- Position: Midfielder

Youth career
- Os

Senior career*
Years	Team	Apps	(Gls)
–2010	Os		
2011–2016	Åsane	144	(13)
2016	Sogndal	6	(0)
2017–2019	Bodø/Glimt	77	(10)
2020	Silkeborg	14	(1)
2020–2022	Bodø/Glimt	7	(3)
2022	Brann	16	(3)
2023–2024	Kongsvinger	46	(7)
2024	Mjøndalen	8	(0)
- * Club domestic league appearances and goals as of 14 November 2024

Vegard Leikvoll Moberg (born 23 January 1991) is a Norwegian professional footballer who plays as a midfielder.

== Club career ==
Moberg started his career in Os. He made his senior debut for Åsane on 16 July 2011 against Pors Grenland; Åsane lost 3–0. He signed for Tippeligaen side Sogndal in the summer on 2016. Before the 2017 season Moberg signed a three-year contract with Bodø/Glimt. On 10 January 2020 Moberg signed a contract with Danish club Silkeborg. His deal was terminated by mutual consent due to personal issues on 5 October 2020 and Moberg returned to Norway. Moberg went back to Bodø/Glimt, on a deal out the 2020 season.

On 14 August 2024, Moberg signed for Mjøndalen.

== Career statistics ==
=== Club ===
As of matches played 5 November 2023

Appearances and goals by club, season and competition
Club	Season	League			National Cup		Continental		Total	
Club	Season	Division	Apps	Goals	Apps	Goals	Apps	Goals	Apps	Goals
Åsane	2011	2. divisjon	4	2	0	0	–		4	2
Åsane	2012	2. divisjon	19	2	2	0	–		21	2
Åsane	2013	2. divisjon	24	1	2	0	–		26	1
Åsane	2014	2. divisjon	16	0	2	0	–		18	0
Åsane	2015	1. divisjon	29	4	2	0	–		31	4
Åsane	2016	1. divisjon	16	1	2	0	–		18	1
Åsane	Total		108	10	10	0	0	0	118	10
Sogndal	2016	Eliteserien	6	0	0	0	–		6	0
Bodø/Glimt	2017	1. divisjon	27	8	2	0	–		29	8
Bodø/Glimt	2018	Eliteserien	24	0	2	0	–		26	0
Bodø/Glimt	2019	Eliteserien	20	2	1	0	–		21	2
Bodø/Glimt	Total		71	10	5	0	0	0	76	10
Silkeborg	2019–20	Danish Superliga	11	1	0	0	–		11	1
Silkeborg	2020–21	Danish 1st Division	3	0	0	0	–		3	0
Silkeborg	Total		14	1	0	0	0	0	14	1
Bodø/Glimt	2020	Eliteserien	7	3	0	0	–		7	3
Bodø/Glimt	2021	Eliteserien	0	0	3	0	2	0	5	0
Bodø/Glimt	Total		7	3	3	0	2	0	12	3
Brann	2022	1. divisjon	16	2	2	0	–		18	2
Brann	Total		16	2	2	0	0	0	18	2
Kongsvinger	2023	1. divisjon	25	3	0	0	–		25	3
Kongsvinger	Total		25	3	0	0	0	0	25	3
Career total			247	29	20	0	2	0	269	29

== Honours ==
Bodø/Glimt

- Eliteserien: 2020
