= Endre Kupen =

Norwegian footballer (born 1990)

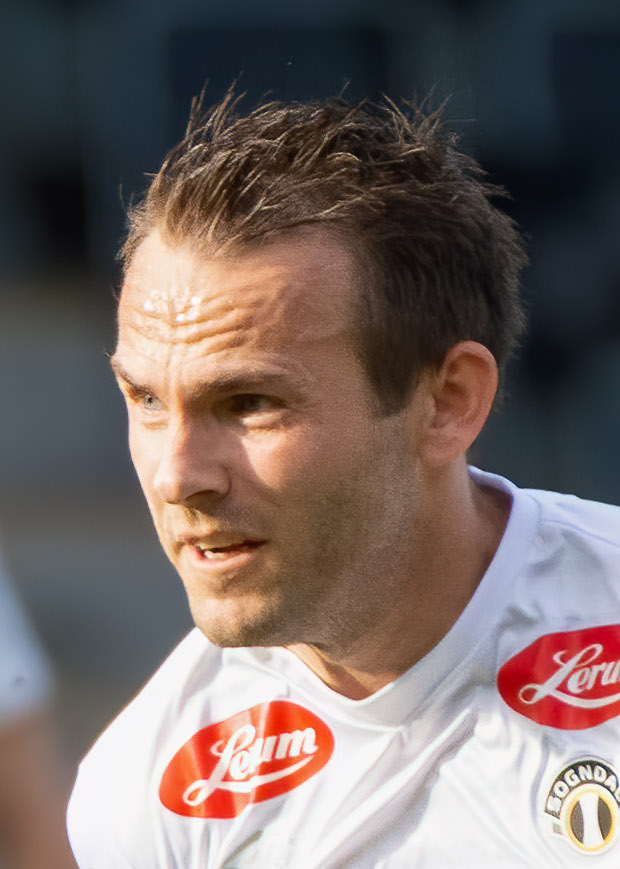

Personal information
- Date of birth: 1 July 1990 (age 36)
- Place of birth: Selje Municipality, Norway
- Height: 1.72 m (5 ft 8 in)
- Position: Forward

Youth career
- Selje IL

Senior career*
Years	Team	Apps	(Gls)
2010–2015	Tornado Måløy	51	(20)
2015–2017	Florø	57	(47)
2018–2020	Bodø/Glimt	8	(0)
2020–2023	Sogndal	59	(5)
- * Club domestic league appearances and goals as of 6 December 2023

Endre Kupen (born 1 July 1990) is a former Norwegian football player.

== Career ==
After having been Florø's top goal scorer in the 2017 1. divisjon, he signed for Glimt on 27 November 2017. Kupen suffered a ligament injury shortly after his arrival at Glimt, keeping him on the sidelines for the duration of the 2018-season. After limited playing time at Bodø/Glimt Kupen signed for Sogndal.

== Career statistics ==
=== Club ===
As of match played 23 April 2023

Appearances and goals by club, season and competition
Club	Season	League			National Cup		Continental		Total	
Club	Season	Division	Apps	Goals	Apps	Goals	Apps	Goals	Apps	Goals
Florø	2015	Oddsen-ligaen	9	7	0	0	-		9	7
Florø	2016	PostNord-ligaen	25	26	1	0	-		26	26
Florø	2017	OBOS-ligaen	23	14	2	0	-		25	14
Florø	Total		57	47	3	0	-	-	60	47
Bodø/Glimt	2018	Eliteserien	0	0	0	0	-		0	0
Bodø/Glimt	2019	Eliteserien	8	0	2	0	-		10	0
Bodø/Glimt	Total		8	0	2	0	-	-	10	0
Sogndal	2020	OBOS-ligaen	26	4	0	0	-		26	4
Sogndal	2021	OBOS-ligaen	20	1	3	0	-		23	1
Sogndal	2022	OBOS-ligaen	8	0	2	1	-		10	1
Sogndal	2023	OBOS-ligaen	2	0	0	0	-		2	0
Sogndal	Total		56	5	5	1	-	-	61	6
Career total			121	52	19	1	-	-	140	53
