= Geir André Herrem =

Norwegian footballer (born 1988)

Personal information
- Full name: Geir André Herrem
- Date of birth: 28 January 1988 (age 38)
- Place of birth: Bryne, Norway
- Height: 1.87 m (6 ft 2 in)
- Position: Striker

Senior career*
Years	Team	Apps	(Gls)
2007–2009	Ålgård	60	(36)
2010–2011	Bryne	16	(10)
2011	SV Babelsberg 03	16	(3)
2011	Flora Tallinn	9	(1)
2012	Bryne	25	(5)
2013–2014	Vidar	37	(25)
2014–2016	Fyllingsdalen	19	(8)
2015	→ Åsane (loan)	15	(7)
2016–2017	Åsane	49	(25)
2018–2019	Bodø/Glimt	31	(7)
2019–2020	Kalmar	18	(1)
2021	Åsane	17	(1)
- * Club domestic league appearances and goals as of 16 January 2022

Geir André Herrem (born 28 January 1988) is a Norwegian former footballer.

He is the cousin of the handball player Camilla Herrem.

== Club career ==
=== FC Flora Tallinn ===
In July 2011, after impressing in a mid-season friendly tournament, he signed a contract until the end of the 2011 season with Estonian champions FC Flora Tallinn. On 3 August he got off the mark for the team as he scored a hat-trick in a round of 64 Estonian Cup match against lower league amateurs FC Lelle. He finished the league season with 9 appearances and 1 goal.

He went on trial at English club Port Vale in February 2013.

Herrem joined FK Vidar after his stint at Port Vale F.C. and became a popular player for the Vidar fans. He left to join Fyllingsdalen in August 2014.

== Career statistics ==
=== Club ===
As of match played 8 November 2020

Appearances and goals by club, season and competition
Club	Season	League			National Cup		Continental		Total	
Club	Season	Division	Apps	Goals	Apps	Goals	Apps	Goals	Apps	Goals
Bryne	2010	1. divisjon	16	10	0	0	-		16	10
Bryne	Total		16	10	0	0	-	-	16	10
SV Babelsberg 03	2010–11	3. Liga	16	3	0	0	-		16	3
SV Babelsberg 03	Total		16	3	0	0	-	-	16	3
Flora	2011	Meistriliiga	9	1	0	0	-		9	1
Flora	Total		9	1	0	0	-	-	9	1
Bryne	2012	1. divisjon	25	5	1	0	-		26	5
Bryne	Total		25	5	1	0	-	-	26	5
Vidar	2013	2. divisjon	24	21	2	2	-		26	23
Vidar	2014	2. divisjon	13	4	2	2	-		15	6
Vidar	Total		37	25	4	4	-	-	41	29
Fyllingsdalen	2014	2. divisjon	12	7	0	0	-		12	7
Fyllingsdalen	2015	2. divisjon	7	1	3	5	-		10	6
Fyllingsdalen	Total		19	8	3	5	-	-	22	13
Åsane (loan)	2015	1. divisjon	15	7	0	0	-		15	7
Åsane	2016	1. divisjon	22	14	2	4	-		24	18
Åsane	2017	1. divisjon	27	11	2	0	-		29	11
Åsane	Total		64	32	4	4	-	-	68	36
Bodø/Glimt	2018	Eliteserien	16	1	5	2	-		21	3
Bodø/Glimt	2019	Eliteserien	15	6	1	0	-		16	6
Bodø/Glimt	Total		31	7	6	2	-	-	37	9
Kalmar	2019	Allsvenskan	7	0	0	0	-		7	0
Kalmar	2020	Allsvenskan	11	1	1	0	-		12	1
Kalmar	Total		18	1	1	0	-	-	19	1
Åsane	2021	OBOS-ligaen	17	1	2	1	-		19	2
Åsane	Total		17	1	2	1	-	-	19	2
Career total			252	93	22	16	-	-	274	109

== Honours ==
Flora Tallinn

- Meistriliiga: 2011
