= Eirik Wollen Steen =

Norwegian footballer (born 1993)

Personal information
- Full name: Eirik Wollen Steen
- Date of birth: 3 October 1993 (age 33)
- Place of birth: Norway
- Height: 1.80 m (5 ft 11 in)
- Position: Defender

Team information
- Current team: Åsane
- Number: 3

Senior career*
Years	Team	Apps	(Gls)
2013–2017	Åsane	123	(4)
2018	Bodø/Glimt	4	(0)
2019–	Åsane	156	(4)
- * Club domestic league appearances and goals as of 1 December 2025

Eirik Wollen Steen (born 3 October 1993) is a Norwegian footballer. He plays as a defender for Åsane.

== Club career ==
Wollen Steen was born in Norway. He made his senior debut for Åsane on 26 June 2013 against Fløy; Åsane lost 4–1. He signed for Eliteserien side Bodø/Glimt before the 2018 season.

== Career statistics ==
As of 3 October 2020

Season	Club	Division	League		Cup		Total	
Season	Club	Division	Apps	Goals	Apps	Goals	Apps	Goals
2013	Åsane	2. divisjon	14	2	0	0	14	2
2014	Åsane	2. divisjon	24	0	2	0	26	0
2015	Åsane	1. divisjon	30	0	3	0	33	0
2016	Åsane	1. divisjon	29	0	2	0	31	0
2017	Åsane	1. divisjon	26	2	3	0	29	2
2018	Bodø/Glimt	Eliteserien	4	0	2	0	6	0
2019	Åsane	2. divisjon	17	1	0	0	17	1
2020	Åsane	1. divisjon	18	0	0	0	18	0
Career Total			172	5	12	0	174	5
