= 2023 FK Bodø/Glimt season =

Bodø/Glimt
2023 season
- President: Inge Henning Andersen
- Head coach: Kjetil Knutsen
- Stadium: Aspmyra Stadion
- Eliteserien: 1st
- 2022 Norwegian Cup: Semi-finals
- 2023 Norwegian Cup: Runners-up
- 2022–23 Europa Conference League: Knockout round play-offs
- 2023–24 Europa Conference League: Knockout round play-offs
- Top goalscorer: League: Amahl Pellegrino (24); All: Amahl Pellegrino (33)
- Biggest win: Bodø/Glimt 4–0 Stabæk; Bodø/Glimt 5–1 Viking
Home colours	Away colours	Third colours

The 2023 season was FK Bodø/Glimt's 107th season in existence and the club's sixth consecutive season in the top flight of Norwegian football. In addition to the domestic league, FK Bodø/Glimt participated in this season's edition of the Norwegian Football Cup and the UEFA Europa Conference League.

== Players ==
=== First-team squad ===
As of 4 September 2023

Note: Flags indicate national team as defined under FIFA eligibility rules; some limited exceptions apply. Players may hold more than one non-FIFA nationality.

No.	Pos.	Nation	Player
1	GK	NOR	Julian Faye Lund
2	DF	NOR	Marius Lode
3	DF	NOR	Omar Elabdellaoui
4	DF	NOR	Odin Bjørtuft
5	DF	NOR	Brice Wembangomo
6	DF	NOR	Isak Amundsen
7	FW	NOR	Amahl Pellegrino
8	MF	DEN	Albert Grønbæk
10	MF	NOR	Daniel Bassi
11	FW	NOR	Runar Espejord
12	GK	RUS	Nikita Haikin
14	MF	NOR	Ulrik Saltnes
15	DF	NOR	Fredrik André Bjørkan
16	MF	NOR	Morten Konradsen
18	DF	NOR	Brede Moe

No.	Pos.	Nation	Player
19	MF	NOR	Sondre Brunstad Fet
20	MF	NOR	Fredrik Sjøvold
22	FW	NOR	Petter Nosakhere Dahl
25	MF	NOR	Tobias Fjeld Gulliksen
27	FW	NOR	Sondre Sørli
28	FW	NOR	Oscar Kapskarmo
29	FW	CMR	Faris Moumbagna
30	DF	DEN	Adam Sørensen
37	MF	NOR	Ask Tjærandsen-Skau
44	GK	NOR	Magnus Brøndbo
45	GK	NOR	Isak Sjong
47	DF	NOR	Stian Kristiansen
77	MF	NOR	Patrick Berg (captain)
99	FW	SLO	Nino Žugelj

=== Out on loan ===
Note: Flags indicate national team as defined under FIFA eligibility rules; some limited exceptions apply. Players may hold more than one non-FIFA nationality.

No.	Pos.	Nation	Player
17	MF	NOR	Gaute Høberg Vetti (at Stabæk until end of 2023)
21	DF	CZE	Lucas Kubr (at Moss until end of 2023)
23	FW	DEN	Jeppe Kjær (at Sandefjord until end of 2023)

No.	Pos.	Nation	Player
26	DF	NOR	Sigurd Kvile (at Fredrikstad until end of 2023)
33	MF	NOR	Mats Pedersen (at Mjøndalen until end of 2023)
—	MF	NOR	Syver Skundberg Skeie (at Hødd until end of 2023)

== Transfers ==
=== Winter ===
In: Note: Flags indicate national team as defined under FIFA eligibility rules; some limited exceptions apply. Players may hold more than one non-FIFA nationality.

No.	Pos.	Nation	Player
3	DF	NOR	Omar Elabdellaoui (free transfer)
4	DF	NOR	Odin Bjørtuft (from Odd)
9	FW	NOR	Lasse Selvåg Nordås (loan return from Tromsø)
12	GK	RUS	Nikita Haikin (from (England) Bristol City)
15	DF	NOR	Fredrik André Bjørkan (from (Germany) Hertha)
23	FW	DEN	Jeppe Kjær (from (Netherlands) Jong Ajax)
29	FW	CMR	Faris Pemi Moumbagna (from Kristiansund)
30	DF	DEN	Adam Sørensen (from (Denmark) Lyngby)
33	MF	NOR	Mats Pedersen (promoted from junior squad)
37	MF	NOR	Ask Tjærandsen-Skau (loan return from Jerv)
44	GK	NOR	Magnus Brøndbo (promoted from junior squad)
45	GK	NOR	Isak Sjong (promoted from junior squad)
93	FW	NOR	Joel Mvuka (on loan from (France) Lorient)
—	MF	NOR	Syver Skundberg Skeide (from Hødd)
—	FW	NOR	Petter Nosakhare Dahl (from KFUM)

Out: Note: Flags indicate national team as defined under FIFA eligibility rules; some limited exceptions apply. Players may hold more than one non-FIFA nationality.

No.	Pos.	Nation	Player
2	DF	DEN	Japhet Sery Larsen (to Brann)
3	DF	ISL	Alfons Sampsted (to (Netherlands) Twente)
4	DF	NOR	Marius Høibråten (to (Japan) Urawa Red Diamonds)
9	FW	NOR	Ola Solbakken (to (Italy) Roma)
12	GK	RUS	Nikita Khaykin (to (England) Bristol City)
15	MF	NOR	Anders Konradsen (retired)
23	MF	NOR	Elias Kristoffersen Hagen (to (Sweden) IFK Göteborg)
25	GK	NOR	Marcus Ellingsen Andersen (to Hødd)
26	DF	NOR	Sigurd Kvile (on loan to Sarpsborg 08)
32	FW	NOR	Joel Mvuka (to (France) Lorient)
35	MF	NOR	Adan Abadala Hussein (to Moss)
77	FW	GHA	Gilbert Koomson (to Sandefjord, previously on loan at Aalesund)
88	FW	NOR	Lars-Jørgen Salvesen (to Viking)
–	MF	NOR	Syver Skundberg Skeide (on loan to Hødd)
—	FW	NOR	Petter Nosakhare Dahl (on loan to KFUM)

=== Summer ===
In: Note: Flags indicate national team as defined under FIFA eligibility rules; some limited exceptions apply. Players may hold more than one non-FIFA nationality.

No.	Pos.	Nation	Player
10	MF	NOR	Daniel Bassi (from Tromsø)
22	FW	NOR	Petter Nosakhare Dahl (loan return from KFUM)
25	FW	NOR	Tobias Fjeld Gulliksen (from Strømsgodset)
28	FW	NOR	Oscar Forsmo Kapskarmo (from Junkeren)
47	DF	NOR	Stian Kristiansen (from Junkeren)

Out: Note: Flags indicate national team as defined under FIFA eligibility rules; some limited exceptions apply. Players may hold more than one non-FIFA nationality.

No.	Pos.	Nation	Player
9	FW	NOR	Lasse Selvåg Nordås (to Tromsø)
10	MF	NOR	Hugo Vetlesen (to (Belgium) Club Brugge)
17	MF	NOR	Gaute Vetti (on loan to Stabæk)
21	DF	CZE	Lucas Kubr (on loan to Moss)
23	FW	DEN	Jeppe Kjær (on loan to Sandefjord)
26	DF	NOR	Sigurd Kvile (on loan to Fredrikstad, previously on loan at Sarpsborg 08)
33	MF	NOR	Mats Pedersen (on loan to Mjøndalen)
93	FW	NOR	Joel Mvuka (loan return to (France) Lorient)

== Pre-season and friendlies ==
Win Draw Loss Fixtures

12 January 2023 Friendly	Bodø/Glimt (Norway)	8–0	(Norway) Junkeren	Bodø
17:00 CET (UTC+1)	Moe 10'; Grønbæk 33'; Bjørkan 44'; Salvesen 55', 62', 67' (pen.), 82'; Pedersen 89'			Stadium: Aspmyra Stadion

19 January 2023 Friendly	Viking (Norway)	0–1	(Norway) Bodø/Glimt	San Pedro del Pinatar, Spain
18:00 CET (UTC+1)			Nordås 51' (pen.)	Stadium: Pinatar Arena

26 January 2023 Friendly	Bodø/Glimt (Norway)	0–0	(Sweden) Kalmar	San Pedro del Pinatar, Spain
17:00 CET (UTC+1)				Stadium: Pinatar Arena

2 February 2023 Friendly	Viborg (Denmark)	4–3	(Norway) Bodø/Glimt	Algorfa, Spain
16:00 CET (UTC+1)	Bonde 7', 23'; Leemans 15', 33'		Grønbæk 13', 75'; Žugelj 50'	Stadium: La Finca Golf & Spa Resort

9 February 2023 Friendly	Silkeborg (Denmark)	2–2	(Norway) Bodø/Glimt	Algorfa, Spain
14:00 CET (UTC+1)	Adamsen 50'; Sonne 57'		Pellegrino 40'; Žugelj 59'	Stadium: La Finca Golf & Spa Resort

10 March 2023 Friendly	Aalesund (Norway)	1–1	(Norway) Bodø/Glimt	Ålesund
12:00 CET (UTC+1)	Kristensen 85'	Report	Grønbæk 65'	Stadium: Color Line Stadion

2 April 2023 Friendly	Molde (Norway)	2–3	(Norway) Bodø/Glimt	Molde
13:00 CEST (UTC+2)	Haugen 7'; Brynhildsen 30'	Report	Pemi 35'; Sørli 42'; Grønbæk 82'	Stadium: Aker Stadion; Referee: Marius Hansen Grøtta

== Competitions ==
=== Overview ===
Competition	First match	Last match	Starting round	Final position	Record							
Competition	First match	Last match	Starting round	Final position	Pld	W	D	L	GF	GA	GD	Win %
Eliteserien	10 April 2023	3 December 2023	Matchday 1	Winners	30	22	4	4	78	38	+40	73.33
2022 Norwegian Cup	5 March 2023	26 April 2023	Fourth round	Semi-finals	3	2	0	1	9	4	+5	66.67
2023 Norwegian Cup	25 May 2023	9 December 2023	First round	Runners-up	7	6	0	1	16	6	+10	85.71
2022–23 Europa Conference League	16 February 2023	23 February 2023	Knockout round play-offs	Knockout round play-offs	2	0	1	1	0	1	−1	0.00
2023–24 Europa Conference League	27 July 2023		Second qualifying round		10	7	2	1	23	9	+14	70.00
Total					52	37	7	8	126	58	+68	71.15

Last updated: 9 December 2023
Source: Soccerway

=== Eliteserien ===
==== League table ====
Pos	Team	Pld	W	D	L	GF	GA	GD	Pts	Qualification or relegation
1	Bodø/Glimt (C)	30	22	4	4	78	38	+40	70	Qualification for the Champions League second qualifying round
2	Brann	30	19	4	7	55	35	+20	61	Qualification for the Conference League second qualifying round
3	Tromsø	30	19	4	7	48	33	+15	61	Qualification for the Conference League second qualifying round
4	Viking	30	18	4	8	61	48	+13	58	
5	Molde	30	15	6	9	65	39	+26	51	Qualification for the Europa League second qualifying round (Note: Molde qualified for the Europa League second qualifying round by winning the 2023 Norwegian Football Cup.)

Source: Football Association of Norway (in Norwegian)
Rules for classification: 1) Points; 2) Goal difference; 3) Goals scored; 4) Head-to-head points; 5) Head-to-head goal difference; 6) Head-to-head goals scored.
(C) Champions

==== Results summary ====
Overall								Home						Away					
Pld	W	D	L	GF	GA	GD	Pts	W	D	L	GF	GA	GD	W	D	L	GF	GA	GD
30	22	4	4	78	38	+40	70	12	2	1	39	16	+23	10	2	3	39	22	+17

Last updated: 3 December 2023.

==== Results by round ====
Round	1	2	3	4	5	6	7	8	9	10	11	12	13	14	15	16	17	18	19	20	21	22	23	24	25	26	27	28	29	30
Ground	A	H	A	H	A	H	A	H	A	H	A	H	A	H	A	H	A	H	A	H	A	A	H	A	H	H	A	H	A	H
Result	W	W	W	D	W	W	W	W	W	W	L	D	W	W	W	L	L	W	W	W	D	D	W	W	W	W	W	W	L	W
Position	2	1	1	1	1	1	1	1	1	1	1	1	1	1	1	1	1	1	1	1	1	1	1	1	1	1	1	1	1	1

A = Away; H = Home; W = Win; D = Draw; L = Loss

==== Matches ====
The league fixtures were announced on 9 December 2022.

10 April 2023 1	Sarpsborg 08	0–2	Bodø/Glimt	Sarpsborg
17:00 CEST (UTC+2)	Skipper (yellow card) 53'; Andersen (red card) 56'	Report	Sørli 5'; Grønbæk 13'; Bjørtuft (yellow card) 90'	Stadium: Sarpsborg Stadion; Attendance: 6,932; Referee: Ola Hobber Nilsen

16 April 2023 2	Bodø/Glimt	4–0	Stabæk	Bodø
17:00 CEST (UTC+2)	Pellegrino 3', 9', 54'; Grønbæk 23'	Report	Høgh (yellow card) 43'	Stadium: Aspmyra Stadion; Attendance: 6,583; Referee: Marius Hansen Grøtta

23 April 2023 3	Aalesund	0–3	Bodø/Glimt	Ålesund
17:00 CEST (UTC+2)	Diop (yellow card) 4'; Moe (yellow card) 34'; Munksgaard (yellow card) 40'	Report	Grønbæk 6'; Pemi 17'; Pellegrino 59'	Stadium: Color Line Stadion; Attendance: 4,950; Referee: Mohammad Usman Aslam

29 April 2023 4	Bodø/Glimt	2–2	Brann	Bodø
18:00 CEST (UTC+2)	Pellegrino 78', 90+2'	Report	Wolfe (yellow card) 8'; Wassberg 15'; Finne 44'; Nilsen (yellow card) 49'; Kristiansen (yellow card) 85'; Crone (yellow card) 90+2'	Stadium: Aspmyra Stadion; Attendance: 7,626; Referee: Svein Oddvar Moen

3 May 2023 18	Bodø/Glimt	2–0	Odd	Bodø
18:00 CEST (UTC+2)	Pemi (yellow card) 31'; Bjørtuft (yellow card) 48'; Vetlesen 55'; Pellegrino 82'	Report	Owusu (yellow card) 17'; Wallem (yellow card) 23'	Stadium: Aspmyra Stadion; Attendance: 5,944; Referee: Sivert Øksnes Amland

7 May 2023 5	Lillestrøm	1–2	Bodø/Glimt	Lillestrøm
19:15 CEST (UTC+2)	Adams 60'; Gabrielsen (yellow card) 90+7'	Report	Pemi 52', 71' (yellow card) 54'; Vetlesen (yellow card) 84'; Sjøvold (yellow card) 86'	Stadium: Åråsen Stadion; Attendance: 8,070; Referee: Rohit Saggi

13 May 2023 6	Bodø/Glimt	3–2	Rosenborg	Bodø
17:00 CEST (UTC+2)	Pemi 7'; Vetlesen 45+2'; Mvuka 60'; Lode (yellow card) 78' (yellow-red card) 84'; Pellegrino (yellow card) 79'; Grønbæk (yellow card) 88'	Report	Nypan 11'; Rogers (yellow card) 28'; Ingason 58'; Børkeeiet (yellow card) 66'; Skjelbred (red card) 76'; Tagseth (yellow card) 90+1'	Stadium: Aspmyra Stadion; Attendance: 8,244; Referee: Kristoffer Hagenes

16 May 2023 7	Tromsø	2–3	Bodø/Glimt	Tromsø
18:00 CEST (UTC+2)	Erlien 2', 60'; Gundersen (yellow card) 56'; Antonsen (yellow card) 83'	Report	Pemi 4', 58'; Pellegrino 25' (pen.); Vetlesen (yellow card) 67'	Stadium: Romssa Arena; Attendance: 6,691; Referee: Ola Hobber Nilsen

29 May 2023 8	Bodø/Glimt	5–1	Viking	Bodø
17:00 CEST (UTC+2)	Grønbæk 14'; Mvuka 28', 90+4'; Berg (yellow card) 58' (goal) 90'; Pellegrino 88'	Report	Stensness (yellow card) 45+1'; Tripić (yellow card) 67'; Salvesen 78'; Sandberg (yellow card) 85'	Stadium: Aspmyra Stadion; Attendance: 6,633; Referee: Espen Andreas Eskås

4 June 2023 9	Vålerenga	1–3	Bodø/Glimt	Oslo
17:00 CEST (UTC+2)	Jensen (yellow card) 57'; El-Abdellaoui 90'	Report	Pemi (yellow card) 20' (goal) 31', 67'; Pellegrino 48'; Vetlesen (yellow card) 63'	Stadium: Intility Arena; Attendance: 12,018; Referee: Tore Hansen

11 June 2023 10	Bodø/Glimt	3–0	HamKam	Bodø
17:00 CEST (UTC+2)	Grønbæk (yellow card) 11'; Pellegrino 64', 67'; Vetlesen 79'	Report	Opsahl (yellow card) 75'	Stadium: Aspmyra Stadion; Attendance: 6,291; Referee: Steinar Hauge

25 June 2023 11	Strømsgodset	2–0	Bodø/Glimt	Drammen
19:15 CEST (UTC+2)	Brunes 45+2'; Valsvik (yellow card) 82'; Stenevik (yellow card) 88'; Gulliksen 90+5'	Report		Stadium: Marienlyst Stadion; Attendance: 6,766; Referee: Sigurd Smehus Kringstad

2 July 2023 12	Bodø/Glimt	2–2	Molde	Bodø
19:15 CEST (UTC+2)	Pemi 66'; Saltnes 90+3' (yellow card) 90+5'	Report	Brynhildsen (yellow card) 7' (goal) 24', 35'; Karlstrøm (red card) 17'; Petersen (yellow card) 41'; Risa (yellow card) 42'; Mannsverk (yellow card) 45+3'; Hansen (yellow card) 46'; Haugan (yellow card) 60'	Stadium: Aspmyra Stadion; Attendance: 7,409; Referee: Kristoffer Hagenes

9 July 2023 13	Odd	0–2	Bodø/Glimt	Skien
17:00 CEST (UTC+2)	Baccay (yellow card) 43'; Hien (yellow card) 90+2'	Report	Grønbæk 27'; Pellegrino 58'; Elabdellaoui (yellow card) 75'	Stadium: Skagerak Arena; Attendance: 5,474; Referee: Mohammad Usman Aslam

16 July 2023 14	Bodø/Glimt	2–1	Haugesund	Bodø
17:00 CEST (UTC+2)	Bjørtuft (yellow card) 13'; Pemi 46'; Sørli 56'	Report	Leite 3'	Stadium: Aspmyra Stadion; Attendance: 6,661; Referee: Svein Tore Sinnes

23 July 2023 15	Sandefjord	2–5	Bodø/Glimt	Sandefjord
17:00 CEST (UTC+2)	Nilsson 13'; Smeulers (yellow card) 15' (yellow-red card) 63'; Ayer 21'; Taaje (yellow card) 34'	Report	Grønbæk 11', 41'; Pellegrino 34' (pen.); Pemi (yellow card) 53' (goal) 76'; Saltnes 88'	Stadium: Release Arena; Attendance: 4,391; Referee: Ajdin Medic

30 July 2023 16	Bodø/Glimt	0–2	Tromsø	Bodø
19:15 CEST (UTC+2)	Grønbæk (yellow card) 66'	Report	Romsaas 21'; Paintsil 62'; Antonsen (yellow card) 66'; Yttergård Jenssen (yellow card) 70'	Stadium: Aspmyra Stadion; Attendance: 8,192; Referee: Tore Hansen

6 August 2023 17	Viking	3–2	Bodø/Glimt	Stavanger
19:15 CEST (UTC+2)	Salvesen 4'; Solbakken 8'; Tripić (yellow card) 37' (goal) 75'; Yazbek (yellow card) 90+6'	Report	Pemi 21'; Grønbæk 39'; Berg (yellow card) 73'	Stadium: Viking Stadion; Attendance: 15,703; Referee: Ola Hobber Nilsen

20 August 2023 19	Haugesund	1–3	Bodø/Glimt	Haugesund
17:00 CEST (UTC+2)	Diarra 48'; Krusnell (yellow card) 63' (red card) 84'; Christensen (yellow card) 65'	Report	Moe (yellow card) 4'; Bjørtuft (yellow card) 43'; Pellegrino (yellow card) 46' (goal) 51', 72'; Grønbæk (yellow card) 50'; Pemi 62'	Stadium: Haugesund Stadion; Attendance: 5,342; Referee: Mohammad Usman Aslam

3 September 2023 21	HamKam	4–4	Bodø/Glimt	Hamar
19:15 CEST (UTC+2)	Haikin 1' (o.g.); Gammelby 25'; Bjarnason (yellow card) 61' (goal) 74'; Onsrud 71'	Report	Pellegrino 49', 61'; Berg 66', 68'; Fet (yellow card) 85'	Stadium: Briskeby Stadion; Attendance: 4,532; Referee: Sigurd Smehus Kringstad

17 September 2023 22	Rosenborg	1–1	Bodø/Glimt	Trondheim
17:00 CEST (UTC+2)	Sæter 45' (pen.) (yellow card) 21'; Nypan (yellow card) 24'; Pereira (yellow card) 84'	Report	Gulliksen 7' (yellow card) 66'; Saltnes (yellow card) 53'; Wembangomo (yellow card) 56'	Stadium: Lerkendal Stadion; Attendance: 21,266; Referee: Rohit Saggi

24 September 2023 23	Bodø/Glimt	4–2	Vålerenga	Bodø
17:00 CEST (UTC+2)	Pellegrino 2' (pen.), 15', 59' (pen.), 90+1'	Report	Børven 7'; Bitri (yellow card) 57'; Ilić 63'	Stadium: Aspmyra Stadion; Attendance: 7,388; Referee: Svein Oddvar Moen

1 October 2023 20	Bodø/Glimt	2–0	Strømsgodset	Bodø
19:15 CEST (UTC+2)	Gulliksen 2'; Saltnes 60'; Pellegrino (yellow card) 72'	Report	Vilsvik (yellow card) 53'	Stadium: Aspmyra Stadion; Attendance: 5,927; Referee: Espen Eskås

8 October 2023 24	Molde	1–3	Bodø/Glimt	Molde
17:00 CEST (UTC+2)	Grødem 30'; Ellingsen (yellow card) 35'; Kaasa (yellow card) 38'; Breivik (penalty missed) 55'; Haugen (yellow card) 78'; Eriksen (yellow card) 87'	Report	Saltnes 26'; Breivik 43' (o.g.); Gulliksen 48'; Grønbæk (penalty missed) 76'; Berg (yellow card) 77'; Moe (yellow card) 78'; Moumbagna (penalty missed) 84'	Stadium: Aker Stadion; Attendance: 7,407; Referee: Sivert Øksnes Amland

21 October 2023 25	Bodø/Glimt	4–3	Sandefjord	Bodø
15:00 CEST (UTC+2)	Pemi 22' (yellow card) 45+1'; Žugelj 24'; Grønbæk 27'; Saltnes 45+2'; Haikin (yellow card) 90+2'	Report	Kjær 13'; Al-Saed 36'; Mørk (yellow card) 49'; Dunsby 53'	Stadium: Aspmyra Stadion; Attendance: 6,401; Referee: Daniel Higraff

30 October 2023 26	Bodø/Glimt	3–1	Lillestrøm	Bodø
18:30 CEST (UTC+1)	Moe 7'; Pellegrino 63'; Wembangomo 76'	Report	Lundemo (yellow card) 4'; Bakke (yellow card) 59'; Roseth 68'	Stadium: Aspmyra Stadion; Attendance: 5,832; Referee: Kai Erik Steen

5 November 2023 27	Stabæk	0–4	Bodø/Glimt	Bærum
17:00 CEST (UTC+1)		Report	Sørli 23'; Pemi 25'; Bjørkan 44'; Saltnes 90+2'	Stadium: Nadderud Stadion; Attendance: 3,707; Referee: Sivert Øksnes Amland

12 November 2023 28	Bodø/Glimt	1–0	Aalesund	Bodø
17:00 CEST (UTC+1)	Hopland 37' (o.g.)	Report		Stadium: Aspmyra Stadion; Attendance: 7,851; Referee: Steinar Hauge

26 November 2023 29	Brann	4–2	Bodø/Glimt	Bergen
17:00 CEST (UTC+1)	Finne 7', 28'; Castro 39', 47'; Crone (yellow card) 90+1'	Report	Gulliksen 53' (yellow card) 60'; Kapskarmo 82' (yellow card) 83'	Stadium: Brann Stadion; Attendance: 16,832; Referee: Svein Oddvar Moen

3 December 2023 30	Bodø/Glimt	2–0	Sarpsborg 08	Bodø
17:00 CEST (UTC+1)	Pellegrino 20'; Sørensen (yellow card) 63'; Žugelj 75'; Kapskarmo (yellow card) 89'	Report	Skipper (yellow card) 48'	Stadium: Aspmyra Stadion; Attendance: 6,234; Referee: Marius Hansen Grøtta

=== Norwegian Football Cup ===
==== 2022 ====
5 March 2023 Fourth round	Ranheim	0–4	Bodø/Glimt	Trondheim
17:00 CET (UTC+1)		Report	Pellegrino 37'; Mvuka 48'; Vetlesen 68'; Sjøvold 85'	Stadium: EXTRA Arena; Attendance: 1,625; Referee: Marius Hansen Grøtta

18 March 2023 Quarter-finals	Bodø/Glimt	5–3	Viking	Bodø
16:15 CET (UTC+1)	Lode (yellow card) 20'; Espejord 52', 81'; Mvuka (yellow card) 55'; Žugelj 70', 75'; Pellegrino 90+1'	Report	Tripić 35'; Stensness 45'; Salvesen 59'; Solbakken (yellow card) 60'	Stadium: Aspmyra Stadion; Referee: Kristoffer Hagenes

26 April 2023 Semi-finals	Lillestrøm	1–0	Bodø/Glimt	Lillestrøm
20:15 CEST (UTC+2)	Olsen 45'; Adams (yellow card) 87'; Tønnessen (yellow card) 87'	Report	Berg (yellow card) 68'	Stadium: Åråsen Stadion; Attendance: 6,200; Referee: Espen Andreas Eskås

==== 2023 ====
25 May 2023 First round	Mosjøen	0–3	Bodø/Glimt	Mosjøen
19:00 CEST (UTC+2)	Kadziolka (yellow card) 27'; Kazacoks (yellow card) 47'; Martinus (yellow card) 77'	Report	Nordås (yellow card) 15'; Žugelj 41', 74' (yellow card) 50'; Grønbæk 43'	Stadium: Kippermoen Idrettspark; Referee: Anders Bodding

1 June 2023 Second round	Junkeren	1–2	Bodø/Glimt	Bodø
18:00 CEST (UTC+2)	Melstein (yellow card) 22'; Lien 56'	Report	Amundsen 42'; Pemi 87'	Stadium: Nordlandshallen; Attendance: 2,006; Referee: Martin Berg

7 June 2023 Third round	Ranheim	0–2	Bodø/Glimt	Trondheim
18:00 CEST (UTC+2)	Tromsdal (yellow card) 25'; Rismark (yellow card) 90+3'	Report	Berg 34'; Grønbæk 49'	Stadium: EXTRA Arena; Attendance: 1,858; Referee: Daniel Higraff

28 June 2023 Fourth round	Bodø/Glimt	3–2	Tromsø	Bodø
19:05 CEST (UTC+2)	Žugelj 77'; Bjørtuft 90+4'; Saltnes 90+6'; Pellegrino (yellow card) 90+7'	Report	Hjertø-Dahl 20'; Gundersen (yellow card) 45'; Erlien 69'; Jenssen (yellow card) 85'; Diouf (yellow card) 87' (yellow-red card) 90+2'	Stadium: Aspmyra Stadion; Attendance: 6,377; Referee: Rohit Saggi

13 July 2023 Quarter-finals	HamKam	0–2	Bodø/Glimt	Hamar
18:00 CEST (UTC+2)	Kurtovic (yellow card) 79'	Report	Grønbæk 55'; Bjørtuft (yellow card) 70'; Berg 76'	Stadium: Briskeby Stadion; Attendance: 3,861; Referee: Tore Hansen

28 September 2023 Semi-finals	Vålerenga	2–4	Bodø/Glimt	Oslo
19:00 CEST (UTC+2)	Riisnæs (yellow card) 12'; Ilić 15', 59'; Hagen (yellow card) 26'	Report	Saltnes 3'; Pemi 56', 86'; Grønbæk (yellow card) 57'; Gulliksen (yellow card) 63'; Sørensen 90+5'	Stadium: Intility Arena; Attendance: 10,863; Referee: Tore Hansen

9 December 2023 Final	Bodø/Glimt	0–1	Molde	Oslo
16:00 CET (UTC+1)	Wembangomo (yellow card) 29'; Moumbagna (yellow card) 90+2'	Report	Eriksen (yellow card) 27'; Gulbrandsen 89'; Berisha (yellow card) 90+8'	Stadium: Ullevaal Stadion; Attendance: 19,178; Referee: Kristoffer Hagenes

=== UEFA Europa Conference League ===
==== 2022–23 ====
===== Knockout round play-offs =====
16 February 2023 First leg	Bodø/Glimt (Norway)	0–0	(Poland) Lech Poznań	Bodø
18:45 CET (UTC+1)	Pemi (yellow card) 66'	Report	Murawski (yellow card) 35'	Stadium: Aspmyra Stadion; Attendance: 6,925; Referee: Harald Lechner (Austria)

23 February 2023 Second leg	Lech Poznań (Poland)	1–0 (1–0 agg.)	(Norway) Bodø/Glimt	Poznań, Poland
21:00 CET (UTC+1)	Pereira (yellow card) 40'; Ishak 63'	Report	Berg (yellow card) 61'; Žugelj (yellow card) 89'	Stadium: Stadion Poznań; Attendance: 34,017; Referee: Nikola Dabanović (Montenegro)

==== 2023–24 ====
===== Second qualifying round =====
The draw for the second qualifying round was held on 21 June 2023.

27 July 2023 First leg	Bodø/Glimt (Norway)	3–0	(Czech Republic) Bohemians 1905	Bodø
18:00 CEST (UTC+2)	Moe (yellow card) 39'; Grønbæk 44'; Pellegrino 50'; Berg (yellow card) 70'; Espejord 90+2'	Report	Hrubý (yellow card) 5'; Beran (yellow card) 70'	Stadium: Aspmyra Stadion; Attendance: 7,476; Referee: Arda Kardeşler (Turkey)

3 August 2023 Second leg	Bohemians 1905 (Czech Republic)	2–4 (2–7 agg.)	(Norway) Bodø/Glimt	Prague, Czech Republic
19:00 CEST (UTC+2)	Matoušek 26'; Beran (yellow card) 40'; Hála (yellow card) 44'; Křapka 55'; Köstl (yellow card) 58'; Prekop (yellow card) 80'	Report	Sørli 22'; Pemi 42'; Grønbæk 78'; Berg (yellow card) 84'; Sørensen 87'	Stadium: Stadion Letná; Attendance: 12,089; Referee: Marcel Bîrsan (Romania)

===== Third qualifying round =====
The draw for the third qualifying round was held on 24 July 2023.

10 August 2023 First leg	Bodø/Glimt (Norway)	3–0	(Armenia) Pyunik	Bodø
18:00 CEST (UTC+2)	Grønbæk 6'; Pemi 31'; Pellegrino 56'	Report	Bravo (yellow card) 45'	Stadium: Aspmyra Stadion; Attendance: 6,009; Referee: Ion Orlic (Moldova)

17 August 2023 Second leg	Pyunik (Armenia)	0–3 (0–6 agg.)	(Norway) Bodø/Glimt	Abovyan, Armenia
20:00 AMT (UTC+4)	Malakyan (yellow card) 45'; Juninho (yellow card) 63'	Report	Pellegrino 43' (pen.); Berg 49'; Gulliksen 54'	Stadium: Abovyan City Stadium; Attendance: 5,230; Referee: Matthew De Gabriele (Malta)

===== Play-off round =====
The draw for the play-off round was held on 7 August 2023.

24 August 2023 First leg	Sepsi OSK (Romania)	2–2	(Norway) Bodø/Glimt	Sfântu Gheorghe, Romania
20:00 EEST (UTC+3)	Ștefănescu (yellow card) 23'; Alimi 48' (pen.); Matei 81' (pen.)	Report	Moumbagna 19'; Bjørtuft (yellow card) 47'; Berg 69'; Haikin (yellow card) 81'	Stadium: Stadionul Sepsi Arena; Attendance: 7,710; Referee: Ruddy Buquet (France)

31 August 2023 Second leg	Bodø/Glimt (Norway)	3–2 (a.e.t.) (5–4 agg.)	(Romania) Sepsi OSK	Bodø
18:00 CEST (UTC+2)	Sørli 24'; Pellegrino 29', 100' (pen.); Gulliksen (yellow card) 62'	Report	Niczuly (yellow card) 12'; Rodríguez (yellow card) 28'; Alimi 42'; Varga 46'; Ciobotariu (yellow card) 58'; Dumitrescu (yellow card) 60'; Šafranko (yellow card) 70'; Păun (yellow card) 81'; Ștefănescu (yellow card) 103' (yellow-red card) 120+1'; Rondón (yellow card) 111'	Stadium: Aspmyra Stadion; Attendance: 6,799; Referee: Rob Harvey (Republic of Ireland)

==== Group stage ====
The draw for the group stage was held on 1 September 2023.

Pos	Team	Pld	W	D	L	GF	GA	GD	Pts	Qualification	BRU	BOD	BEŞ	LUG
1	(Belgium) Club Brugge	6	5	1	0	15	3	+12	16	Advance to round of 16	—	3–1	1–1	2–0
2	(Norway) Bodø/Glimt	6	3	1	2	11	8	+3	10	Advance to knockout round play-offs	0–1	—	3–1	5–2
3	(Turkey) Beşiktaş	6	1	1	4	7	14	−7	4 (Note: Ranked on head-to-head goal difference: Beşiktaş +1, Lugano –1.)		0–5	1–2	—	2–3
4	(Switzerland) Lugano	6	1	1	4	6	14	−8	4		1–3	0–0	0–2	—

Source: UEFA
Rules for classification: Group stage tiebreakers
Notes:

21 September 2023 1	Lugano (Switzerland)	0–0	(Norway) Bodø/Glimt	Zürich, Switzerland
21:00 CEST (UTC+2)	Sabbatini (yellow card) 65'; Bislimi (yellow card) 76'; Saipi (yellow card) 90+1'	Report	Saltnes (yellow card) 68'	Stadium: Letzigrund; Attendance: 1,384; Referee: David Šmajc (Slovenia)

5 October 2023 2	Bodø/Glimt (Norway)	0–1	(Belgium) Club Brugge	Bodø
18:45 CEST (UTC+2)	Gulliksen (yellow card) 63'; Grønbæk (yellow card) 66'; Bjørkan (yellow card) 71'	Report	Vanaken 20'; Skóraś (yellow card) 36'; De Cuyper (yellow card) 44'; Jutglà (yellow card) 90+1'	Stadium: Aspmyra Stadion; Attendance: 7,481; Referee: Ondřej Berka (Czech Republic)

26 October 2023 3	Bodø/Glimt (Norway)	3–1	(Turkey) Beşiktaş	Bodø
21:00 CEST (UTC+2)	Grønbæk 28'; Berg (yellow card) 56'; Moumbagna 58'; Saltnes 87'	Report	Ghezzal (yellow card) 68'; Muleka (yellow card) 89'; Moe 90+1' (o.g.)	Stadium: Aspmyra Stadion; Attendance: 7,115; Referee: Nenad Minaković (Serbia)

9 November 2023 4	Beşiktaş (Turkey)	1–2	(Norway) Bodø/Glimt	Istanbul, Turkey
20:45 TRT (UTC+3)	Uysal (yellow card) 47' (yellow-red card) 90+3'; Bingöl 64' (yellow card) 80'; Rebić (yellow card) 75'	Report	Pemi 38', 49'; Žugelj (yellow card) 90+2'	Stadium: Beşiktaş Park; Attendance: 17.314; Referee: Sander van der Ejik (Netherlands)

30 November 2023 5	Bodø/Glimt (Norway)	5–2	(Switzerland) Lugano	Bodø
18:45 CET (UTC+1)	Pellegrino 40', 78' (yellow card) 60'; Pemi (yellow card) 41'; Brunstad Fet 52'; Berg 65'; Žugelj (yellow card) 81'; Kapskarmo 88'	Report	Mahmoud (yellow card) 45'; Saipi (yellow card) 60'; Cimignani (yellow card) 63'; Celar 69'; Babic 86'; Vladi (yellow card) 90+2'	Stadium: Aspmyra Stadion; Attendance: 6,295; Referee: Dario Bel (Croatia)

14 December 2023 6	Club Brugge (Belgium)	3–1	(Norway) Bodø/Glimt	Bruges, Belgium
21:00 CET (UTC+1)	Nusa 26'; Thiago 58'; Mechele (yellow card) 75' (goal) 89'; Skov Olsen (yellow card) 82'; Odoi (yellow card) 84'	Report	Kapskarmo (yellow card) 23'; Moe (yellow card) 45+1'; Pellegrino 57' (pen.); Amundsen (yellow card) 62'	Stadium: Jan Breydel Stadium; Attendance: 15,835; Referee: Anastasios Papapetrou (Greece)

Knockout round play-offs took place during the 2024 season.
