= 2023 Norwegian Football Cup final =

- Event: 2023 Norwegian Football Cup
Bodø/Glimt	Molde
0	1
- Date: 9 December 2023
- Venue: Ullevaal Stadion, Oslo
- Referee: Kristoffer Hagenes
- Attendance: 19,178

The 2023 Norwegian Football Cup final was the final match of the 2023 Norwegian Football Cup, the 117th season of the Norwegian Football Cup, the premier Norwegian football cup competition organized by the Football Association of Norway (NFF). The match was played on 9 December 2023 at the Ullevaal Stadion in Oslo between two Eliteserien sides, Bodø/Glimt and Molde.

== Route to the final ==
Note: In all results below, the score of the finalist is given first.

Bodø/Glimt		Round	Molde	
Mosjøen (D3); A 3–0	Žugelj 41', 74', Grønbæk 43'	First round	Surnadal (D4); A 4–0	Haugen 8', Eriksen 35', Ødegård 43', Berisha 66'
Junkeren (D3); A 2–1	Amundsen 42', Moumbagna 87'	Second round	Melhus (D4); A 6–0	Ødegård 49', Grødem 59', 71', 81', 90', Breivik 88'
Ranheim (D1); A 2–0	Berg 34', Grønbæk 49'	Third round	Kristiansund (D1); A 1–0	Eriksen 66'
Tromsø (ES); H 3–2	Žugelj 77', Bjørtuft 90+4', Saltnes 90+6'	Fourth round	Strømsgodset (ES); H 3–0	Brynhildsen 1', Kitolano 5', Breivik 26' (pen.)
HamKam (ES); A 2–0	Grønbæk 55', Berg 76'	Quarter-final	Sarpsborg 08 (ES); H 3–1	Kitolano 1', Breivik 5', Brynhildsen 35'
Vålerenga (ES); A 4–2	Saltnes 3', Moumbagna 56', 86', Sørensen 90+5'	Semi-final	Kjelsås (D2); A 1–0	Grødem 5'

Key:

- ES = Eliteserien team
- D1 = 1. divisjon team
- D2 = 2. divisjon team
- D3 = 3. divisjon team
- D4 = 4. divisjon team
- H = Home
- A = Away

== Match ==
=== Details ===
9 December 2023
16:00 CET (UTC+1)

Bodø/Glimt	0–1	Molde
	Report	Gulbrandsen 89'

Ullevaal Stadion, Oslo
Attendance: 19,178
Referee: Kristoffer Hagenes (Hovding)

Bodø/Glimt	Molde

Bodø/Glimt:
GK	1	(Norway) Julian Faye Lund
RB	5	(Norway) Brice Wembangomo	(yellow card) 29'	(substituted off) 90+5'
CB	18	(Norway) Brede Moe
CB	6	(Norway) Isak Amundsen		(substituted off) 90+6'
LB	15	(Norway) Fredrik Bjørkan		(substituted off) 90+5'
RM	19	(Norway) Sondre Brunstad Fet		(substituted off) 80'
CM	77	(Norway) Patrick Berg (c)
LM	8	(Denmark) Albert Grønbæk
RW	99	(Slovenia) Nino Žugelj		(substituted off) 80'
CF	29	(Cameroon) Faris Moumbagna	(yellow card) 90+2'
LW	7	(Norway) Amahl Pellegrino
Substitutions:
GK	44	(Norway) Magnus Brøndbo
DF	4	(Norway) Odin Bjørtuft		(substituted on) 90+5'
MF	10	(Norway) Daniel Bassi
MF	14	(Norway) Ulrik Saltnes		(substituted on) 80'
MF	20	(Norway) Fredrik Sjøvold
MF	25	(Norway) Tobias Fjeld Gulliksen		(substituted on) 80'
FW	27	(Norway) Sondre Sørli
FW	28	(Norway) Oscar Kapskarmo		(substituted on) 90+6'
DF	30	(Denmark) Adam Sørensen		(substituted on) 90+5'
Head Coach:
(Norway) Kjetil Knutsen

Molde:
GK	12	(Norway) Oliver Petersen
RB	19	(Norway) Eirik Haugan
CB	3	(Norway) Casper Øyvann
LB	6	(Norway) Martin Ellingsen
RM	31	(Norway) Mathias Løvik		(substituted off) 73'
CM	20	(Norway) Kristian Eriksen	(yellow card) 27'
CM	15	(Norway) Markus Kaasa		(substituted off) 90+4'
CM	16	(Norway) Emil Breivik		(substituted off) 59'
LM	28	(Norway) Kristoffer Haugen
CF	8	(Norway) Fredrik Gulbrandsen		(substituted off) 90+2'
CF	7	(Norway) Magnus Wolff Eikrem (c)		(substituted off) 73'
Substitutions:
GK	34	(Norway) Peder Hoel Lervik
DF	2	(Norway) Martin Bjørnbak		(substituted on) 90+4'
FW	9	(Norway) Veton Berisha	(substituted on) 73'	(yellow card) 90+8'
MF	10	(Norway) Eric Kitolano
DF	21	(Norway) Martin Linnes	(substituted on) 73'
MF	22	(Norway) Magnus Grødem		(substituted on) 90+2'
DF	25	(Denmark) Anders Hagelskjær		(substituted on) 59'
MF	33	(Norway) Niklas Ødegård
MF	50	(Norway) Gustav Nyheim
Head Coach:
(Norway) Erling Moe

MATCH OFFICIALS

- Assistant referees:
  - Jørgen Rønning Valstadsve (IL Fram)
  - Christer Solheim Jørgensen (FK Bergen Nord)
- Fourth official: Sivert Øksnes Amland (Fana Fotball)

MATCH RULES

- 90 minutes.
- 30 minutes of extra-time if necessary.
- Penalty shoot-out if scores still level.
- Nine named substitutes.
- Maximum of five substitutions.
