= 2024 FK Bodø/Glimt season =

Bodø/Glimt
2024 season
- President: Inge Henning Andersen
- Head coach: Kjetil Knutsen
- Stadium: Aspmyra Stadion
- Eliteserien: 1st (champions)
- Norwegian Cup: Third round
- 2023–24 Conference League: Knockout round play-offs
- 2024–25 Champions League: Play-off round
- 2024–25 Europa League: Semi-finals
- Top goalscorer: League: Kasper Høgh (12); All: Kasper Høgh (13)
Home colours	Away colours	Third colours

The 2024 season was FK Bodø/Glimt's 108th season in existence and the club's seventh consecutive season in the top flight of Norwegian football. The club played their first official match this season against the Dutch club Ajax, in the 2023–24 Europa Conference League.

== Players ==
=== First-team squad ===
As of 31 January 2024

Note: Flags indicate national team as defined under FIFA eligibility rules; some limited exceptions apply. Players may hold more than one non-FIFA nationality.

No.	Pos.	Nation	Player
1	GK	NOR	Julian Faye Lund
2	DF	NOR	Marius Lode
3	DF	NOR	Omar Elabdellaoui
4	DF	NOR	Odin Bjørtuft
5	DF	NOR	Brice Wembangomo
6	DF	NOR	Jostein Gundersen
7	MF	NOR	Patrick Berg (captain)
8	MF	DEN	Albert Grønbæk
9	FW	DEN	Kasper Høgh
10	MF	NOR	Daniel Bassi
11	FW	NOR	Runar Espejord
12	GK	RUS	Nikita Haikin
14	MF	NOR	Ulrik Saltnes
15	DF	NOR	Fredrik André Bjørkan
16	MF	NOR	Syver Skeide

No.	Pos.	Nation	Player
17	MF	NOR	Gaute Høberg Vetti
18	DF	NOR	Brede Moe
19	MF	NOR	Sondre Brunstad Fet
20	MF	NOR	Fredrik Sjøvold
21	DF	CZE	Lucas Kubr
23	FW	NOR	Jens Petter Hauge (on loan from Eintracht Frankfurt)
24	GK	NOR	Kjetil Haug (on loan from Toulouse)
26	MF	NOR	Håkon Evjen
27	FW	NOR	Sondre Sørli
28	FW	NOR	Oscar Kapskarmo
30	DF	DEN	Adam Sørensen
44	GK	NOR	Magnus Brøndbo
45	GK	NOR	Isak Sjong
94	FW	NOR	August Mikkelsen
99	FW	SLO	Nino Žugelj

=== Out on loan ===
Note: Flags indicate national team as defined under FIFA eligibility rules; some limited exceptions apply. Players may hold more than one non-FIFA nationality.

No.	Pos.	Nation	Player
22	FW	NOR	Petter Nosakhere Dahl (at KFUM Oslo until end of 2024)
23	FW	DEN	Jeppe Kjær (at Fredrikstad until end of 2024)

No.	Pos.	Nation	Player
33	MF	NOR	Mats Pedersen (at Mjøndalen until end of 2024)

== Transfers ==
=== Winter ===
In: Note: Flags indicate national team as defined under FIFA eligibility rules; some limited exceptions apply. Players may hold more than one non-FIFA nationality.

No.	Pos.	Nation	Player
6	DF	NOR	Jostein Gundersen (from Tromsø)
9	FW	DEN	Kasper Høgh (from Stabæk)
16	MF	NOR	Syver Skeide (loan return from Hødd)
17	MF	NOR	Gaute Vetti (loan return from Stabæk)
21	DF	CZE	Lucas Kubr (loan return from Moss)
23	FW	NOR	Jens Petter Hauge (on loan from (Germany) Eintracht Frankfurt)
24	GK	NOR	Kjetil Haug (on loan from (France) Toulouse)
26	MF	NOR	Håkon Evjen (from (Denmark) Brøndby)
94	FW	NOR	August Mikkelsen (from (Sweden) Hammarby)

Out: Note: Flags indicate national team as defined under FIFA eligibility rules; some limited exceptions apply. Players may hold more than one non-FIFA nationality.

No.	Pos.	Nation	Player
—	DF	NOR	Marius Lode (to (Sweden) Häcken)
6	DF	NOR	Isak Amundsen (to Molde)
7	FW	NOR	Amahl Pellegrino (to (United States) San Jose Earthquakes)
16	MF	NOR	Morten Konradsen (to Haugesund)
22	FW	NOR	Petter Nosakhare Dahl (on loan to KFUM)
23	FW	DEN	Jeppe Kjær (on loan to Fredrikstad, previously on loan at Sandefjord)
25	FW	NOR	Tobias Fjeld Gulliksen (to (Sweden) Djurgården)
26	DF	NOR	Sigurd Kvile (to Fredrikstad, previously on loan)
29	FW	CMR	Faris Moumbagna (to (France) Marseille)
47	DF	NOR	Stian Kristiansen (to Sandefjord)

== Pre-season and friendlies ==
Win Draw Loss Fixtures

19 January 2024 Friendly	Red Bull Salzburg (Austria)	6–0	(Norway) Bodø/Glimt	San Pedro Alcántara, Málaga
16:05 CET (UTC+1)	Fernando 7'; Ratkov 57', 58'; Šimić 76'; Ulmer 83'; Daghim 86'			Stadium: Marbella Football Center

25 January 2024 Friendly	Bodø/Glimt (Norway)	3–2	(Sweden) Hammarby	San Pedro Alcántara, Málaga
16:00 CET (UTC+1)	Gulliksen 9'; Fet 41'; Saltnes 87'	Report	Mikkelsen 37'; Boudah 38'	Stadium: Marbella Football Center

29 January 2024 Friendly	Bodø/Glimt (Norway)	0–2	(Czech Republic) Sparta Praha	San Pedro Alcántara, Málaga
15:30 CET (UTC+1)		Report	Sadílek 34'; Olatunji 59'	Stadium: Marbella Football Center

8 February 2024 Friendly	Malmö FF (Sweden)	0–4	(Norway) Bodø/Glimt	San Pedro Alcántara, Málaga
14:00 CET (UTC+1)		Report	Hauge 10'; Saltnes 11'; Kapskarmo 79'; Gulliksen 90'	Stadium: Marbella Football Center

29 February 2024 Friendly	Sarpsborg 08 (Norway)	0–2	(Norway) Bodø/Glimt	Lillestrøm
15:00 CET (UTC+1)		Report	Moe 24'; Saltnes 57'	Stadium: LSK-Hallen

14 March 2024 Friendly	Bodø/Glimt (Norway)	0–1	(England) Crystal Palace	San Pedro Alcántara, Málaga
16:00 CET (UTC+1)		Report	Eze 23'	Stadium: Marbella Football Center

25 March 2024 Friendly	Bodø/Glimt (Norway)	3–5	(Norway) Molde	Bodø
13:00 CET (UTC+1)	Hauge 34', 52' (pen.); Bjørtuft 73'	Report	Eriksen 42', 61'; Stenevik 45'; Gulbrandsen 53'; Saltnes 64' (o.g.)	Stadium: Aspmyra Stadion

== Competitions ==
=== Overview ===
Competition	First match	Last match	Starting round	Final position	Record							
Competition	First match	Last match	Starting round	Final position	Pld	W	D	L	GF	GA	GD	Win %
Eliteserien	1 April 2024	1 December 2024	Matchday 1	Winner	30	18	8	4	71	31	+40	60.00
Norwegian Cup	9 April 2024	1 May 2024	First round	Third round	3	2	0	1	10	4	+6	66.67
2023–24 Conference League	15 February 2024	22 February 2024	Knockout round play-offs	Knockout round play-offs	2	0	1	1	3	4	−1	0.00
UEFA Champions League	23 July 2024	28 August 2024	Second qualifying round	Play-off round	6	5	0	1	14	5	+9	83.33
UEFA Europa League	25 September 2024		League phase	League phase	8	4	2	2	14	11	+3	50.00
Total					49	29	11	9	112	55	+57	59.18

Last updated: 28 October 2024
Source: Soccerway

=== Eliteserien ===
==== League table ====
Pos	Team	Pld	W	D	L	GF	GA	GD	Pts	Qualification or relegation
1	Bodø/Glimt (C)	30	18	8	4	71	31	+40	62	Qualification for the Champions League play-off round
2	Brann	30	17	8	5	55	33	+22	59	Qualification for the Champions League second qualifying round
3	Viking	30	16	9	5	61	39	+22	57	Qualification for the Conference League second qualifying round
4	Rosenborg	30	16	5	9	52	39	+13	53	Qualification for the Conference League second qualifying round
5	Molde	30	15	7	8	64	36	+28	52	

Source: Football Association of Norway (in Norwegian)
Rules for classification: 1) Points; 2) Goal difference; 3) Goals scored; 4) Head-to-head points; 5) Head-to-head goal difference; 6) Head-to-head goals scored.
(C) Champions

==== Results summary ====
Overall								Home						Away					
Pld	W	D	L	GF	GA	GD	Pts	W	D	L	GF	GA	GD	W	D	L	GF	GA	GD
26	16	6	4	59	24	+35	54	9	3	1	37	11	+26	7	3	3	22	13	+9

Last updated: 28 October 2024.

==== Results by round ====
Round	1	2	3	4	5	6	7	8	9	10	11	12	13	14	15	16	17	18	19	20	21	22	23	24	25	26
Ground	A	H	A	H	A	H	A	H	A	H	A	A	H	A	H	A	H	A	H	H	A	H	A	H	A	H
Result	W	W	W	D	W	W	W	W	L	D	W	W	W	W	W	D	W	D	D	W	W	W	L	W	D	L
Position	3	2	1	1	1	1	1	1	1	1	1	1	1	1	1	1	1	1	1	1	1	1	1	1	1	1

A = Away; H = Home; W = Win; D = Draw; L = Loss

==== Matches ====
The league fixtures were announced on 20 December 2023.

1 April 2024 1	Fredrikstad	0–2	Bodø/Glimt	Fredrikstad
14:30 CEST (UTC+2)	Aukland (yellow card) 27'; Molde (yellow card) 37'; Thomassen (yellow card) 40'	Report	Bjørkan 47'; Mikkelsen 70'; Gundersen (yellow card) 71'	Stadium: Fredrikstad Stadion; Attendance: 10,691; Referee: Rohit Saggi

6 April 2024 2	Bodø/Glimt	1–0	Viking	Bodø
18:00 CEST (UTC+2)	Bjørkan (yellow card) 27'; Evjen (yellow card) 71'; Saltnes 83'	Report	Salvesen (yellow card) 34'; Jensen (yellow card) 72'; D'Agostino (yellow card) 90+6'	Stadium: Aspmyra Stadion; Attendance: 6,584; Referee: Espen Eskås

14 April 2024 3	Lillestrøm	0–5	Bodø/Glimt	Lillestrøm
19:15 CEST (UTC+2)		Report	Žugelj 11'; Hauge (yellow card) 19'; Evjen (yellow card) 48', (goal) 76'; Berg 55', (yellow card) 76'; Grønbæk 59'; Høgh 82'	Stadium: Åråsen Stadion; Attendance: 8,344; Referee: Kristoffer Hagenes

21 April 2024 4	Bodø/Glimt	1–1	Molde	Bodø
19:15 CEST (UTC+2)	Žugelj 8'; Berg (yellow card) 37'; Helstrup (yellow card) 40'	Report	Hestad (yellow card) 52'; Haugen 55'; Eriksen (yellow card) 56'; Stenevik (yellow card) 85'; Løvik (yellow card) 88'	Stadium: Aspmyra Stadion; Attendance: 7,127; Referee: Tore Hansen

27 April 2024 5	Rosenborg	1–3	Bodø/Glimt	Trondheim
18:00 CEST (UTC+2)	Sæter 54' (pen.)	Report	Høgh 7'; Žugelj 36'; Evjen (yellow card) 40'; Grønbæk 51', (yellow card) 90+1'; Bjørkan (yellow card) 65'; Hauge (yellow card) 67'	Stadium: Lerkendal Stadion; Attendance: 21,276; Referee: Rohit Saggi

5 May 2024 6	Bodø/Glimt	1–0	Strømsgodset	Bodø
17:00 CEST (UTC+2)	Evjen 74'	Report	Dahl (yellow card) 24'; Farji (yellow card) 45'	Stadium: Aspmyra Stadion; Attendance: 5,961; Referee: Sivert Øksnes Amland

12 May 2024 7	Kristiansund	2–4	Bodø/Glimt	Kristiansund
14:30 CEST (UTC+2)	Alte (yellow card) 10'; Guèye 44', 84'; Jarl (yellow card) 68'	Report	Grønbæk 37', 67'; Sørensen (yellow card) 40'; Hauge 89', (yellow card) 90+3'; Høgh 90+3'	Stadium: Kristiansund Stadion; Attendance: 4,018; Referee: Daniel Higraff

16 May 2024 8	Bodø/Glimt	4–0	Tromsø	Bodø
18:00 CEST (UTC+2)	Grønbæk 19', 21'; Høgh 63'; Hauge 74'	Report	Erlien (yellow card) 38'	Stadium: Aspmyra Stadion; Attendance: 8,257; Referee: Mohammad Usman Aslam

20 May 2024 9	HamKam	1–0	Bodø/Glimt	Hamar
17:00 CEST (UTC+2)	Simenstad 20'; Mares (yellow card) 51'; Kurtovic (yellow card) 61'; Norheim (yellow card) 73'	Report		Stadium: Briskeby; Attendance: 5,012; Referee: Rohit Saggi

24 May 2024 10	Bodø/Glimt	2–2	KFUM Oslo	Bodø
19:00 CEST (UTC+2)	Grønbæk 41'; Gundersen (yellow card) 51'; Hauge 75'	Report	Nosa Dahl 45'; Nuñez 64'; Hoseth (yellow card) 89'	Stadium: Aspmyra Stadion; Attendance: 6,243; Referee: Marius Hansen Grøtta

29 May 2024 19	Bodø/Glimt	1–1	Sandefjord	Bodø
19:00 CEST (UTC+2)	Grønbæk 45+4' (pen.); Høgh (yellow card) 86'	Report	Markovic 35', (yellow card) 65'; Pedersen (yellow card) 84'; Egeli (yellow card) 85'	Stadium: Aspmyra Stadion; Attendance: 5,853; Referee: Mohammad Usman Aslam

2 June 2024 11	Haugesund	0–1	Bodø/Glimt	Haugesund
17:00 CEST (UTC+2)	Leite (yellow card) 26'	Report	Sørensen (yellow card) 11'; Gundersen (yellow card) 39'; Saltnes 66'	Stadium: Haugesund Sparebank Arena; Attendance: 4,649; Referee: Marius Lien

28 June 2024 12	Sarpsborg	1–2	Bodø/Glimt	Sarpsborg
19:00 CEST (UTC+2)	Meister 23'; Ilić (yellow card) 90+1'	Report	Berg 52'; Bjørkan (yellow card) 77'; Tebo Uchenna 90+2' (o.g.)	Stadium: Sarpsborg Stadion; Attendance: 6,401; Referee: Rohit Saggi

7 July 2024 13	Bodø/Glimt	5–1	Brann	Bodø
14:30 CEST (UTC+2)	Saltnes 20'; Berg (yellow card) 22', (goal) 55', 78'; Gundersen 45+1'; Fet 89'	Report	Nilsen (yellow card) 6' (yellow-red card) 10'; Heggebø 90+3'	Stadium: Aspmyra Stadion; Attendance: 8,118; Referee: Ola Hobber Nilsen

13 July 2024 14	Sandefjord	2–1	Bodø/Glimt	Sandefjord
17:00 CEST (UTC+2)	Tveter 28'; Kristiansen 60', (yellow card) 74'; Keto (yellow card) 76'	Report	Berg 61'	Stadium: Jotun Arena; Attendance: 4,179; Referee: Mohammad Usman Aslam

19 July 2024 15	Bodø/Glimt	3–1	Odd	Bodø
19:00 CEST (UTC+2)	Mikkelsen 12'; Gundersen (yellow card) 47'; Sjøvold 53'; Bjørkan 66'; Kapskarmo (yellow card) 86'	Report	Skjeldal 39'; Ruud (yellow card) 44'; Miettinen (yellow card) 72'	Stadium: Aspmyra Stadion; Attendance: 6,888; Referee: Christian Moen

27 July 2024 16	KFUM Oslo	1–1	Bodø/Glimt	Oslo
16:00 CEST (UTC+2)	Ndiaye 25'; Hjorth (yellow card) 66'	Report	Saltnes 52'	Stadium: KFUM Arena; Attendance: 3,299; Referee: Svein Tore Sinnes

3 August 2024 17	Bodø/Glimt	4–2	Haugesund	Bodø
18:00 CEST (UTC+2)	Helmersen 45+1'; Høgh 55', 74'; Berg 62'	Report	Tounekti 19'; Bizoza (yellow card) 48'; Hope 50'	Stadium: Aspmyra Stadion; Attendance: 6,647; Referee: Marius Lien

10 August 2024 18	Viking	1–1	Bodø/Glimt	Stavanger
18:00 CEST (UTC+2)	Finndell (yellow card) 32'; Austbø 89'	Report	Evjen (yellow card) 33', (goal) 59'	Stadium: SR-Bank Arena; Attendance: 14,976; Referee: Mohammad Usman Aslam

24 August 2024 20	Bodø/Glimt	6–0	Sarpsborg	Bodø
16:00 CEST (UTC+2)	Gundersen 19'; Helmersen 37'; Auklend (yellow card) 48'; Saltnes 72'; Hauge 74'; Høgh 79', 84'	Report	Johansen (yellow card) 32'	Stadium: Aspmyra Stadion; Attendance: 6,223; Referee: Daniel Higraff

1 September 2024 21	Strømsgodset	0–1	Bodø/Glimt	Drammen
17:00 CEST (UTC+2)	Therkelsen (yellow card) 90'	Report	Haikin (yellow card) 44'; Fet 52'	Stadium: Marienlyst Stadion; Attendance: 5,380; Referee: Christian Moen

13 September 2024 22	Bodø/Glimt	3–0	HamKam	Bodø
19:00 CEST (UTC+2)	Høgh 54', 64'; Evjen 68'	Report	Ofkir (yellow card) 27'	Stadium: Aspmyra Stadion; Attendance: 5,879; Referee: Svein Tore Sinnes

22 September 2024 23	Brann	4–1	Bodø/Glimt	Bergen
14:30 CEST (UTC+2)	Castro 19' (pen.), 90+6', (yellow card) 41'; Kornvig 27'; Kartum 45+3', (yellow card) 52'	Report	Evjen (yellow card) 7'; Berg (yellow card) 53'; Zinckernagel 57'	Stadium: Brann Stadion; Attendance: 16,551; Referee: Tore Hansen

29 September 2024 24	Bodø/Glimt	4–0	Kristiansund	Bodø
17:00 CEST (UTC+2)	Hauge 25' (pen.), 45'; Bjørtuft 30'; Zinckernagel 63'	Report		Stadium: Aspmyra Stadion; Attendance: 5,415; Referee: Sivert Øksnes Amland

19 October 2024 25	Tromsø	0–0	Bodø/Glimt	Tromsø
18:00 CEST (UTC+2)		Report	Haikin (yellow card) 90+4'	Stadium: Romssa Arena; Attendance: 6,991; Referee: Rohit Saggi

28 October 2024 26	Bodø/Glimt	2–3	Rosenborg	Bodø
19:00 CET (UTC+1)	Bjørkan 40'; Zinckernagel 50'	Report	Tagseth 36'; Pereira 56'; Nemčík (yellow card) 58'; Tangvik (yellow card) 67'; Jenssen (yellow card) 81'; Sahsah 90+2'; Broholm (yellow card) 90+6'	Stadium: Aspmyra Stadion; Attendance: 6,821; Referee: Mohammad Usman Aslam

3 November 2024 27	Molde	3–3	Bodø/Glimt	Molde
17:00 CET (UTC+1)	Brynhildsen 16', 28' (penalty missed) 40' (yellow card) 72'; Breivik 71'	Report	Saltnes 37'; Wembangomo (yellow card) 40'; Bjørkan 58'; Øyvann 64' (o.g.)	Stadium: Aker Stadion; Attendance: 6,997; Referee: Ola Hobber Nilsen

10 November 2024 28	Bodø/Glimt	2–2	Fredrikstad	Bodø
17:00 CET (UTC+1)	Gundersen (yellow card) 57' (yellow-red card) 67'; Berg 75'; Helmersen 79'; Saltnes (yellow card) 83'	Report	Molde 40'; Metcalfe (yellow card) 50'; Sørløkk (yellow card) 65'; Bjørlo (yellow card) 71'; Skogvold 89'; Johansen (yellow card) 90+3'	Stadium: Aspmyra Stadion; Attendance: 5,872; Referee: Rohit Saggi

23 November 2024 29	Odd	0–2	Bodø/Glimt	Skien
17:00 CET (UTC+1)	Hien (yellow card) 24'; Midtskogen (yellow card) 68'	Report	Berg 2'; Hauge 55'	Stadium: Skagerak Arena; Attendance: 3,971; Referee: Christian Moen

1 December 2024 30	Bodø/Glimt	5–2	Lillestrøm	Bodø
17:00 CET (UTC+1)	Berg 41'; Saltnes 45'; Høgh 52', 72'; Hauge 78'	Report	Larsson 12'; Lehne Olsen 48'; Roseth (yellow card) 82'	Stadium: Aspmyra Stadion; Attendance: 7,707; Referee: Tore Hansen

=== Norwegian Football Cup ===
9 April 2024 First round	Brønnøysund	0–6	Bodø/Glimt	Brønnøysund
18:00 CEST (UTC+2)		Report	Sørli 6', 23', 26'; Kapskarmo 11'; Saltnes 29'; Wembangomo 70'	Stadium: Brønnøysund Kunstgress; Attendance: 2,300; Referee: Oliver Skaret Barsøe

24 April 2024 Second round	Junkeren	0–2	Bodø/Glimt	Bodø
18:00 CEST (UTC+2)	Nordland (yellow card) 37'; Vik (yellow card) 66'	Report	Saltnes 25'; Kubr (yellow card) 29'; Sørli 87'	Stadium: Nordlandshallen; Attendance: 831; Referee: Mohammad Hafezi

1 May 2024 Third round	Bodø/Glimt	2–4	Lillestrøm	Bodø
14:30 CEST (UTC+2)	Evjen 19'; Hauge 41'	Report	Åsen 4', 49' (yellow card) 88'; Vá 28'; Roseth (yellow card) 56'; Gabrielsen 63'	Stadium: Aspmyra Stadion; Attendance: 4,339; Referee: Ola Hobber Nilsen

=== UEFA Conference League ===
==== 2023–24 ====
===== Knockout round play-offs =====
15 February 2024 First leg	Ajax (Netherlands)	2–2	(Norway) Bodø/Glimt	Amsterdam
21:00 CET (UTC+1)	Gooijer (yellow card) 85'; Henderson (yellow card) 87'; Van den Boomen 90+1' (pen.); Berghuis 90+7'	Report	Grønbæk 16', 64'; Moe (yellow card) 37'; Bjørtuft (red card) 90+1'	Stadium: Johan Cruyff Arena; Attendance: 52,267; Referee: António Nobre (Portugal)

22 February 2024 Second leg	Bodø/Glimt (Norway)	1–2 (a.e.t.) (3–4 agg.)	(Netherlands) Ajax	Bodø
18:45 CET (UTC+1)	Grønbæk (yellow card) 57' (yellow-red card) 65'; Žugelj (yellow card) 79'; Berg 83'; Gundersen (yellow card) 90+1'; Evjen (yellow card) 96'	Report	Berghuis 34'; Šutalo (red card) 48'; Rensch (yellow card) 57'; Ramaj (yellow card) 79'; Taylor 114'	Stadium: Aspmyra Stadion; Attendance: 7,885; Referee: Anastasios Sidiropoulos (Greece)

=== UEFA Champions League ===
==== 2024–25 ====
===== Second qualifying round =====
23 July 2024 First leg	Bodø/Glimt (Norway)	4–0	(Latvia) RFS	Bodø
17:00 CEST (UTC+2)	Mikkelsen 2', 76'; Saltnes 18'; Kapskarmo 40'	Report	Panić (yellow card) 44'	Stadium: Aspmyra Stadion; Attendance: 5,427; Referee: Don Robertson (Scotland)

31 July 2024 Second leg	RFS (Latvia)	1–3 (1–7 agg.)	(Norway) Bodø/Glimt	Riga
20:00 EEST (UTC+3)	Ikaunieks 14'; Ondoa (yellow card) 40'; Njie (yellow card) 56'; Markhiyev (yellow card) 58'	Report	Hauge 40' (pen.); Saltnes 82'; Høgh 88'	Stadium: LNK Sporta Parks; Attendance: 1,678; Referee: Viktor Kopiievskyi (Ukraine)

===== Third qualifying round =====
7 August 2024 First leg	Jagiellonia Białystok (Poland)	0–1	(Norway) Bodø/Glimt	Białystok
20:45 CEST (UTC+2)	Nené (yellow card) 68'; Moutinho (yellow card) 90+4'	Report	Diéguez 58' (o.g.); Moe (yellow card) 73'	Stadium: Jagiellonia Stadium; Attendance: 19,447; Referee: Sven Jablonski (Germany)

13 August 2024 Second leg	Bodø/Glimt (Norway)	4–1 (5–1 agg.)	(Poland) Jagiellonia Białystok	Bodø
19:00 CEST (UTC+2)	Fet 34', 56'; Määttä 38'; Høgh 71'; Helmersen (yellow card) 90'	Report	Imaz 4'; Marczuk (yellow card) 80'	Stadium: Aspmyra Stadion; Attendance: 7,228; Referee: Benoît Bastien (France)

===== Play-off round =====
20 August 2024 First leg	Bodø/Glimt (Norway)	2–1	(Serbia) Red Star Belgrade	Bodø
21:00 CEST (UTC+2)	Bjørtuft 52'; Määttä 62'; Bjørkan (yellow card) 77'	Report	Olayinka (yellow card) 45+1'; Ivanić (yellow card) 70'; Mimović 75'	Stadium: Aspmyra Stadion; Attendance: 7,909; Referee: Ivan Kružliak (Slovakia)

28 August 2024 Second leg	Red Star Belgrade (Serbia)	2–0 (3–2 agg.)	(Norway) Bodø/Glimt	Belgrade
21:00 CEST (UTC+2)	Duarte 26' (pen.); Elšnik (yellow card) 55'; Spajić 59'; Rodríguez (yellow card) 87'; Ivanić (yellow card) 90+4'	Report	Sjøvold (yellow card) 61'	Stadium: Red Star Stadium; Attendance: 46,167; Referee: Davide Massa (Italy)

=== UEFA Europa League ===
==== 2024–25 ====
===== League phase =====
Pos	Team	Pld	W	D	L	GF	GA	GD	Pts	Qualification
7	(Hellenic Football Federation) Olympiacos	8	4	3	1	9	3	+6	15	Advance to round of 16 (seeded)
8	(Scottish Football Association) Rangers	8	4	2	2	16	10	+6	14	Advance to round of 16 (seeded)
9	(Norwegian Football Federation) Bodø/Glimt	8	4	2	2	14	11	+3	14	Advance to knockout phase play-offs (seeded)
10	(Royal Belgian Football Association) Anderlecht	8	4	2	2	14	12	+2	14	Advance to knockout phase play-offs (seeded)
11	(Romanian Football Federation) FCSB	8	4	2	2	10	9	+1	14	Advance to knockout phase play-offs (seeded)

Source: UEFA
Rules for classification: League phase tiebreakers

Round	1	2	3	4	5	6	7	8
Ground	H	A	A	H	A	H	H	A
Result	W	D	W	L	L	W	W	D
Position	9	14	9	12	17	13	10	9

Updated to match(es) played on 28 November 2024. Source: UEFA
A = Away; H = Home; W = Win; D = Draw; L = Loss

25 September 2024 1	Bodø/Glimt (Norway)	3–2	(Portugal) Porto	Bodø
18:45 CEST (UTC+2)	Høgh 15'; Hauge 40', 62'; Määttä (yellow card) 45+3' (yellow-red card) 51'; Berg (yellow card) 81'	Report	Omorodion 8'; Zé Pedro (yellow card) 29'; González (yellow card) 71'; Gül 90'	Stadium: Aspmyra Stadion; Attendance: 7,587; Referee: Orel Grinfeld (Israel)

3 October 2024 2	Union Saint-Gilloise (Belgium)	0–0	(Norway) Bodø/Glimt	Brussels
21:00 CEST (UTC+2)	Machida (yellow card) 51'; Niang (yellow card) 68'; Burgess (yellow card) 78'	Report	Bjørtuft (yellow card) 22'; Gundersen (yellow card) 90+1'	Stadium: King Baudouin Stadium; Attendance: 5,576; Referee: Ondřej Berka (Czech Republic)

23 October 2024 3	Braga (Portugal)	1–2	(Norway) Bodø/Glimt	Braga
15:30 WEST (UTC+1)	Moutinho (yellow card) 21'; Niakaté 64', (yellow card) 66' (yellow-red card) 67'; Oliveira (yellow card) 90+1'	Report	Zinckernagel (yellow card) 36'; Fet (yellow card) 41'; Evjen 53'; Nielsen 90+4'	Stadium: Estádio Municipal; Attendance: 8,253; Referee: Nenad Minaković (Serbia)

7 November 2024 4	Bodø/Glimt (Norway)	1–2	(Azerbaijan) Qarabağ	Bodø
18:45 CET (UTC+1)	Berg 41', (yellow card) 89'	Report	Bayramov 22'; Zoubir 69'; Medina (yellow card) 78'; Kochalski (yellow card) 85'	Stadium: Aspmyra Stadion; Referee: Luís Godinho (Portugal)

28 November 2024 5	Manchester United (England)	3–2	(Norway) Bodø/Glimt	Manchester
20:00 GMT (UTC+0)	Garnacho 1'; Højlund 45', 50'; Onana (yellow card) 89'; Casemiro (yellow card) 90+1'	Report	Evjen 19'; Zinckernagel 23'; Helmersen (yellow card) 31'	Stadium: Old Trafford; Referee: Lawrence Visser (Belgium)

12 December 2024 6	Bodø/Glimt (Norway)	2–1	(Turkey) Beşiktaş	Bodø
21:00 CET (UTC+1)	Zinckernagel 37'; Bjørtuft 43'	Report	Fernandes 21'	Stadium: Aspmyra Stadion; Attendance: 5,813; Referee: Filip Glova (Slovakia)

The last 2 matches of the League phase as well as the knockout phase were played during the 2025 season.
