= SK Trygg/Lade =

Norwegian football club

- Full name: Sportsklubben Trygg/Lade
- Founded: 15 May 1910 (merger 4 February 1986)
- Ground: Obosbanen, Trondheim
- League: Third Division
- 2024: 3rd

Sportsklubben Trygg/Lade is a Norwegian multi-sports club from Lade, Trondheim. It has sections for association football, team handball and floorball.

The club was founded on 15 May 1910. It took the name SK Tryggkameratene and was centered at Buran, later Lade. At Lade, a local sports team Lade IL was founded on 13 June 1963. The two clubs were merged on 4 February 1986, choosing a compounded name SK Trygg/Lade.

The men's football team plays in the Third Division, the fourth tier of Norwegian football. Following a Third Division stint in 2016, and another short-lived spell in 2022, the team only spent one year in the 2023 Fourth Division before winning re-promotion. In both the 2024 and 2025 Third Division, the team was a contender for promotion to the Second Division.

In conjunction with the Third Division spells (2016 to 2025), Trygg/Lade became a regular team in the Norwegian Cup, though losing in the first round on every occasion. In the 2025–26 edition, Trygg/Lade finally managed to progress to the second round after eliminating second-tier team Ranheim.

== Notable players ==
Several Norway U21 and senior internationals have played for Trygg/Lade:

- Odin Thiago Holm
- Per Ciljan Skjelbred
- Fredrik Sjøvold
