= Omar Elabdellaoui =

Norwegian footballer (born 1991)

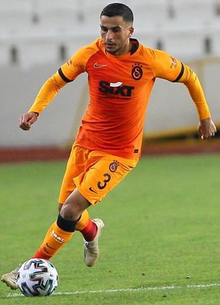
- Elabdellaoui playing for Galatasaray in 2020

Personal information
- Full name: Omar Elabdellaoui
- Date of birth: 5 December 1991 (age 34)
- Place of birth: Oslo, Norway
- Height: 1.79 m (5 ft 10 in)
- Positions: Right back; right midfielder

Youth career
- Sagene IF
- Skeid
- 2008–2011: Manchester City

Senior career*
Years	Team	Apps	(Gls)
2011–2013	Manchester City	0	(0)
2011	→ Strømsgodset (loan)	10	(0)
2012	→ Feyenoord (loan)	5	(0)
2013	→ Eintracht Braunschweig (loan)	14	(0)
2013–2014	Eintracht Braunschweig	29	(1)
2014–2020	Olympiacos	116	(10)
2017	→ Hull City (loan)	8	(0)
2020–2022	Galatasaray	17	(0)
2023–2024	Bodø/Glimt	12	(0)
Total		211	(11)

International career
2008	Norway U17	8	(1)
2009–2010	Norway U19	11	(1)
2010–2013	Norway U21	13	(1)
2012–2013	Norway U23	1	(1)
2013–2020	Norway	49	(0)
Medal record
Men's football
Representing Norway
UEFA European Under-21 Championship
Third place	2013 Israel
- * Club domestic league appearances and goals

Omar Elabdellaoui (born 5 December 1991) is a Norwegian former professional footballer who played as a right back and as a right midfielder.

Elabdellaoui began his career with Skeid before signing with Manchester City in 2008. He never appeared for the club. He made his professional debut while on loan at Strømsgodset. He has also spent a loan spell in the Netherlands with Feyenoord. After spending a half season on loan with Eintracht Braunschweig in 2013, Elabdellaoui joined the German side permanently in May 2013. He signed for Olympiacos in June 2014 and stayed at the club until August 2020 when he moved to Galatasaray.

Elabdellaoui represented Norway at youth international level, and was with Norway in the 2013 UEFA European Under-21 Football Championship. He played for the senior national team from 2013 to 2020.

== Club career ==
=== Manchester City ===
After playing for the Norwegian club Skeid, Elabdellaoui joined the English club Manchester City when he was 16 years old. Scott Sellars, coach of the City's U18 team, stated in an interview with Norwegian TV 2 in January 2010 that Elabdellaoui had "a big future". Elabdellaoui made an impressive effort at the academy and was awarded a first-team number for the 2010–11 season, but sat on the bench during City's Europa League match against Juventus on 16 December 2010.

=== Strømsgodset ===
On 31 March 2011, the last day of the Norwegian transfer window, Elabdellaoui was loaned out to Strømsgodset in Norway until City's pre-season started in July. In Strømsgodset he was reunited with his teammates from City, Mohammed Abu and Razak Nuhu. He played eight league matches before fracturing his foot in the league match against Fredrikstad on 28 May 2011, and returned to Manchester for surgery. On 1 September, he returned to Strømsgodset where he played until the end of the 2011-season, in a total of 12 matches, scoring one goal and giving one assist.

Strømsgodset wanted Elabdellaoui for another loan-spell for the 2012 season, but Elabdellaoui was reluctant to play at Godset's home ground Marienlyst Stadion because he was concerned that its artificial turf would re-injure him.

=== Feyenoord ===
In June 2012, Elabdellaoui signed a two-year contract with City, and was loaned to the Dutch club Feyenoord for the 2012–13 season. His teammate at City, John Guidetti, who was loaned to the same club in the 2011–12 season, both recommended Elabdellaoui to Feyenoord and advised Eladbellaoui to accept Feyenoord's offer if Manchester City let him go. Guidetti said that Elabdellaoui was a perfect fit for Feyenoord because he was physically strong, technically well-equipped and a fast player. According to Feyenoord's technical director Martin van Geel, Elabdellaoui was to mostly play as a left or right winger, but would also play as an attacking midfielder behind the forwards. He also said that Feyenoord wanted Eladbellaoui on their team for a couple of years, but were unable to sign him previously.

Elabdellaoui played five matches for Feyenoord, four as a substitute, until he in January 2013 requested to be released from the club. He wanted to play regularly and realized that his chances at Feyenoord would be limited, where he were competing against the right back and the right wing at the Netherlands national team.

=== Eintracht Braunschweig ===
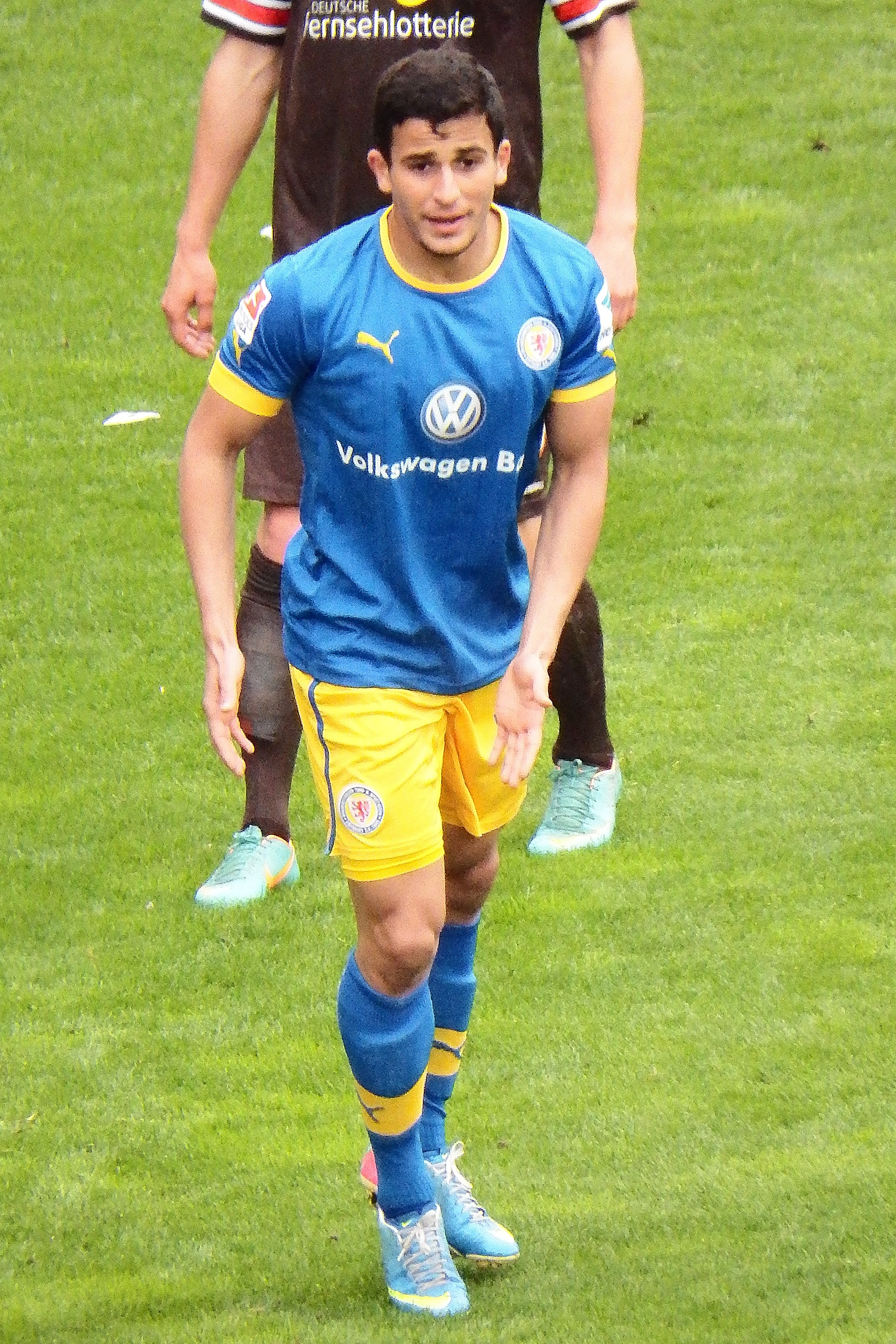
Elabdellaoui with Eintracht Braunschweig in May 2013

In January 2013, Elabdellaoui was loaned to German club Eintracht Braunschweig for the second half of the 2012–13 2. Bundesliga season. He became a regular from the start and won promotion to the Bundesliga with his team. On 10 May, the club announced that the loan deal had been made permanent.

Following their promotion, he made his debut in the top flight against Werder Bremen on 10 August 2013. He started the first three matches of the season as a right back, but sat on the bench in the next match against Hamburg.

=== Olympiacos ===
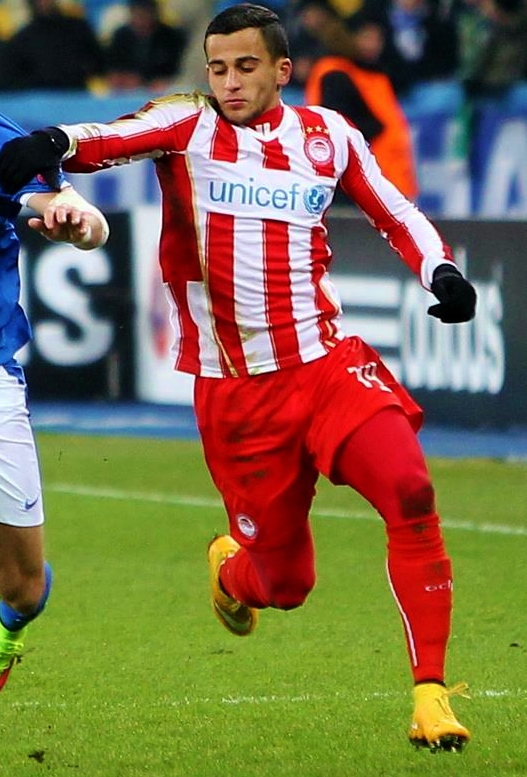
Elabdellaoui playing for Olympiacos.

On 17 June 2014 he was offered a contract by Greek club Olympiacos. He signed for the club the next day, stating that he was very excited to be a part of the club.

==== Loan to Hull City ====
On 20 January 2017, Elabdellaoui signed a loan deal with Hull City, linking him with his international teammates Markus Henriksen and Adama Diomande. Hull were given the option to make the deal permanent at the end of the season. He made his debut two days later in the 2–0 away loss to Chelsea.

==== Return to Olympiacos ====
Elabdellaoui's form during the 2018–19 season attracted interest from other clubs, though Olympiacos said they would have had to offer a minimum of 5 million euros.

Elabdellaoui was made club captain for the 2019–20 season and made 47 appearances in all competitions playing an important role in his side winning the Greek Super League.

In August 2020, he announced that he was leaving the club.

=== Galatasaray ===
Following his departure from Olympiacos, Elabdellaoui signed a three-year deal with Turkish club Galatasaray worth a reported €4,050,000 in total salary.

On 31 December 2020, during the New Year celebrations, fireworks detonated in Elabdellaoui's hands. He was transferred to hospital for treatment, with specific concern over injuries to his eyes.

Elabdellaoui returned to training in July 2021, wearing protective glasses. In February 2022, after more than ten eye surgeries, he prepared to play again. His eyes were reconstructed in the United States with the help of his sister and an anonymous donor.

His contract was unilaterally terminated by Galatasaray on 2 September 2022.

=== Return to Norway ===
In December 2022 he signed a contract with Bodø/Glimt for the 2023 and 2024 seasons. In his first year at Bodø/Glimt, he was part of the side that helped the club win their third league title in just four seasons.

== International career ==
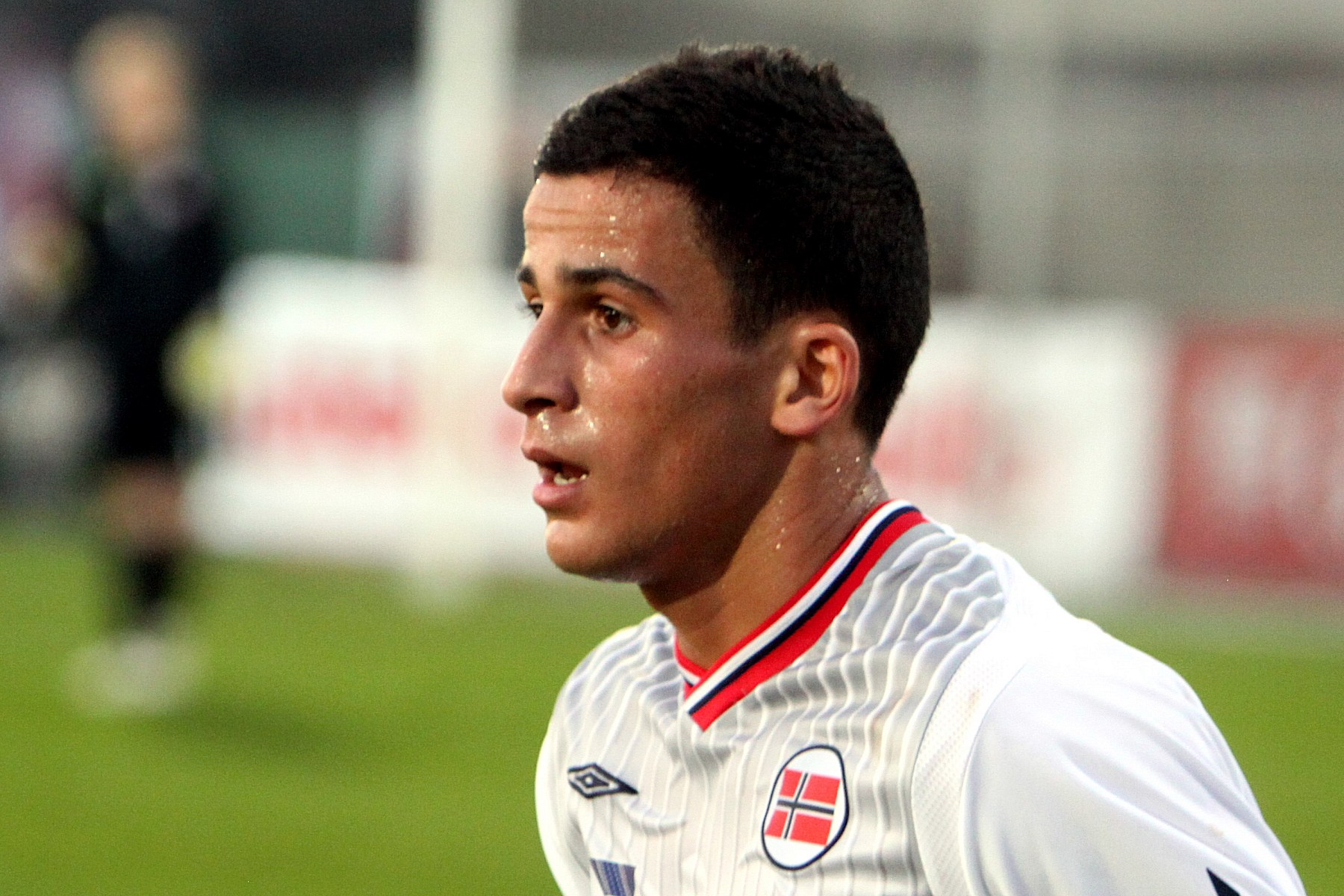
Elabdellaoui playing for Norway U21 in 2011

Elabdellaoui made his debut for Norway when he played for the under-15 team in the 0–0 draw Poland U15 on 8 August 2006, in a match where Stefan Johansen also made his debut at youth international level. Elabdellaoui played one more match for the under-15 team before he scored one goal in ten matches for the under-16 team. He later scored one goal in eight matches for the under-17 team, before he made six appearances for the under-18 team and eleven for the under-19 team, where he scored one goal.

Elabdellaoui made his debut for the Norway national under-21 football team against Greece U-21 on 17 October 2010. He featured heavily in the 2013 UEFA European Under-21 Football Championship qualification as a right-back.

He made his debut for the Norway under-23 team in a game against Wales in June 2012, with Elabdellaoui as the first goalscorer in the 4–0 victory.

Elabdellaoui was first called up for the Norwegian national team for the friendly match against Sweden in August 2013, and made his debut for the senior team when he started the match and played 72 minutes as a right back.

== Personal life ==
Elabdellaoui is of Moroccan descent and is the cousin of Mohammed Abdellaoue and Mustafa Abdellaoue.

== Career statistics ==
=== Club ===
As of 3 November 2024

Appearances and goals by club, season and competition
Club	Season	League			National cup (Note: Includes Norwegian Cup, KNVB Cup, DFB-Pokal, Greek Football Cup, FA Cup, Turkish Cup)		Europe		Total	
Club	Season	Division	Apps	Goals	Apps	Goals	Apps	Goals	Apps	Goals
Strømsgodset (loan)	2011	Tippeligaen	10	0	1	0	–		11	0
Feyenoord (loan)	2012–13	Eredivisie	5	0	1	0	1 (Note: Appearance(s) in UEFA Europa League)	0	7	0
Eintracht Braunschweig (loan)	2012–13	2. Bundesliga	14	0	0	0	–		14	0
Eintracht Braunschweig (loan)	2013–14	Bundesliga	29	1	1	0	–		30	1
Eintracht Braunschweig (loan)	Total		43	1	1	0	–		44	1
Olympiacos	2014–15	Super League Greece	24	1	0	0	8 (Note: Six appearances in UEFA Champions League, two appearances in UEFA Europa League)	0	32	1
Olympiacos	2015–16	Super League Greece	20	2	2	0	7 (Note: Six appearances in UEFA Champions League, one appearance in UEFA Europa League)	0	29	2
Olympiacos	2016–17	Super League Greece	2	0	1	1	1	0	4	1
Olympiacos	2017–18	Super League Greece	19	1	2	0	6 (Note: Appearances in UEFA Champions League)	0	27	1
Olympiacos	2018–19	Super League Greece	23	5	0	0	8	0	31	5
Olympiacos	2019–20	Super League Greece	28	1	3	0	16 (Note: Twelve appearances in UEFA Champions League, four appearances in UEFA Europa League)	0	47	1
Olympiacos	Total		116	10	8	1	46	0	170	11
Hull City (loan)	2016–17	Premier League	8	0	1	0	–		9	0
Galatasaray	2020–21	Süper Lig	10	0	1	0	2	0	13	0
Galatasaray	2021–22	Süper Lig	7	0	0	0	0	0	7	0
Galatasaray	Total		17	0	1	0	2	0	20	0
Bodø/Glimt	2023	Eliteserien	11	0	3	0	0	0	14	0
Bodø/Glimt	2024	Eliteserien	1	0	0	0	0	0	1	0
Bodø/Glimt	Total		12	0	3	0	0	0	15	0
Career total			211	11	16	1	49	0	276	12

=== International ===
As of match played 22 January 2021

Appearances and goals by national team and year
National team	Year	Apps	Goals
Norway	2013	6	0
Norway	2014	7	0
Norway	2015	8	0
Norway	2016	2	0
Norway	2017	5	0
Norway	2018	7	0
Norway	2019	9	0
Norway	2020	5	0
Total		49	0

== Honours ==
Olympiacos

- Super League Greece: 2014–15, 2015–16, 2016–17, 2019–20

Bodø/Glimt

- Eliteserien: 2023

Norway U21

- UEFA European Under-21 Championship bronze: 2013

Individual

- Norwegian Footballer of the Year: 2015
- Super League Greece Team of the Season: 2014–15, 2018–19, 2019–20
