= Sjetne IL =

Norwegian sports club

- Full name: Sjetne Idrettslag
- Founded: 19 October 1970
- Ground: Sjetnebanen, Trondheim

Sjetne Idrettslag is a Norwegian multi-sports club from Trondheim. The club has sections for association football, team handball, floorball, Nordic skiing and athletics.

The club was founded on 19 October 1970. The club colours are maroon and white.

The club is mainly known for the women's handball team. With players such as Hege Kristine Kvitsand and goalkeeper Annette Skotvoll, the team won the playoff round in 1993. The club subsequently contested the 1993–94 Women's EHF Cup. Coached by Željko Tomac, the team brought on a Croatian player Suzana Golja as Sjetne drew the Greek team Doukas in the first round. In the second round, Sjetne drew with Valencia Urbana away, but lost 15–17 at home, which the local press called "lacklustre".

The women's handball team was later relegated from the highest league in 1998, and again in 2000.

As of 2025, the club fields no football teams above boys' 14 and girls' 14. Professional players starting as children's players in Sjetne include Fredrik Sjøvold.
