= 1993–94 Women's EHF Cup =

European handball tournament

The 1993–94 Women's EHF Cup was the 13th edition of the competition. Viborg HK defeated Debreceni VSC on away goals to become the first Danish club to win it. CB Amadeo Tortajada and CSL Dijon also reached the semifinals, while defending champion Rapid București was defeated in the Round of 16.

== Round of 32 ==
Team #1	Agg.	Team #2	1st	2nd
Struzanka (North Macedonia)	walkover	(Luxembourg) Berschem		
Aura Iași (Romania)	75–33	(Israel) Maccabi Holon	34–16	41–17
Martve Tbilisi (Georgia (country))	42–57	(Portugal) Colégio de Gaia	21–29	21–28
Dijon (France)	49–47	(Slovenia) Kočevje	29–25	20–22
AZS Wroclaw (Poland)	64–33	(Belarus) Universitet Gomel	35–15	29–18
Leipzig (Germany)	38–43	(Denmark) Viborg	17–24	21–19
ÍBV (Iceland)	38–41	(Latvia) Varpa Riga	23–22	15–19
Lokomotiva Zagreb (Croatia)	59–23	(Belgium) Meeuwen	31–13	28–10
Union St. Polten (Austria)	34–64	(Turkey) Külturspor Ankara	18–30	16–34
Presov (Slovakia)	47–48	(Azerbaijan) Baku	25–23	22–25
Spono Nottwil (Switzerland)	37–57	(Spain) Amadeo Tortajada	15–27	22–30
Sjetne (Norway)	61–29	(Greece) Doukas	31–15	30–14
Vytis Kaunas (Lithuania)	29–66	(Hungary) Debreceni	14–34	15–32
Rossiyanka Volgograd (Russia)	63–27	(Italy) Sassari	34–14	29–13
Spartak Kyiv (Ukraine)	38–41	(Netherlands) PSV Eindhoven	37–15	36–13
Rapid București (Romania)	Bye			

== Round of 16 ==
Team #1	Agg.	Team #2	1st	2nd
Struzanka (North Macedonia)	50–58	(Romania) Aura Iași	20–26	15–24
Colégio de Gaia (Portugal)	49–57	(France) Dijon	24–27	25–30
AZS Wroclaw (Poland)	51–63	(Denmark) Viborg	29–29	22–34
Varpa Riga (Latvia)	34–62	(Croatia) Lokomotiva Zagreb	19–30	15–32
Külturspor Ankara (Turkey)	47–48	(Azerbaijan) Baku	25–23	22–25
Amadeo Tortajada (Spain)	38–36	(Norway) Sjetne	21–21	17–15
Debreceni (Hungary)	47–37	(Russia) Rossiyanka Volgograd	26–18	21–19
Spartak Kyiv (Ukraine)	48–43	(Romania) Rapid București	24–18	24–25

== Quarter-finals ==
Team #1	Agg.	Team #2	1st	2nd
Aura Iași (Romania)	50–58	(France) Dijon	28–29	22–29
Viborg (Denmark)	41–40	(Croatia) Lokomotiva Zagreb	22–19	19–21
Baku (Azerbaijan)	44–62	(Spain) Amadeo Tortajada	21–33	23–29
Debreceni (Hungary)	58–42	(Ukraine) Spartak Kyiv	33–19	25–23

== Semifinals ==
Team #1	Agg.	Team #2	1st	2nd
Dijon (France)	32–52	(Denmark) Viborg	12–19	20–33
Amadeo Tortajada (Spain)	38–46	(Hungary) Debreceni	24–22	14–24

== Final ==
Team #1	Agg.	Team #2	1st	2nd
Viborg (Denmark)	44–44	(Hungary) Debreceni	23–20	21–24
