= Brede Moe =

Norwegian footballer (born 1991)

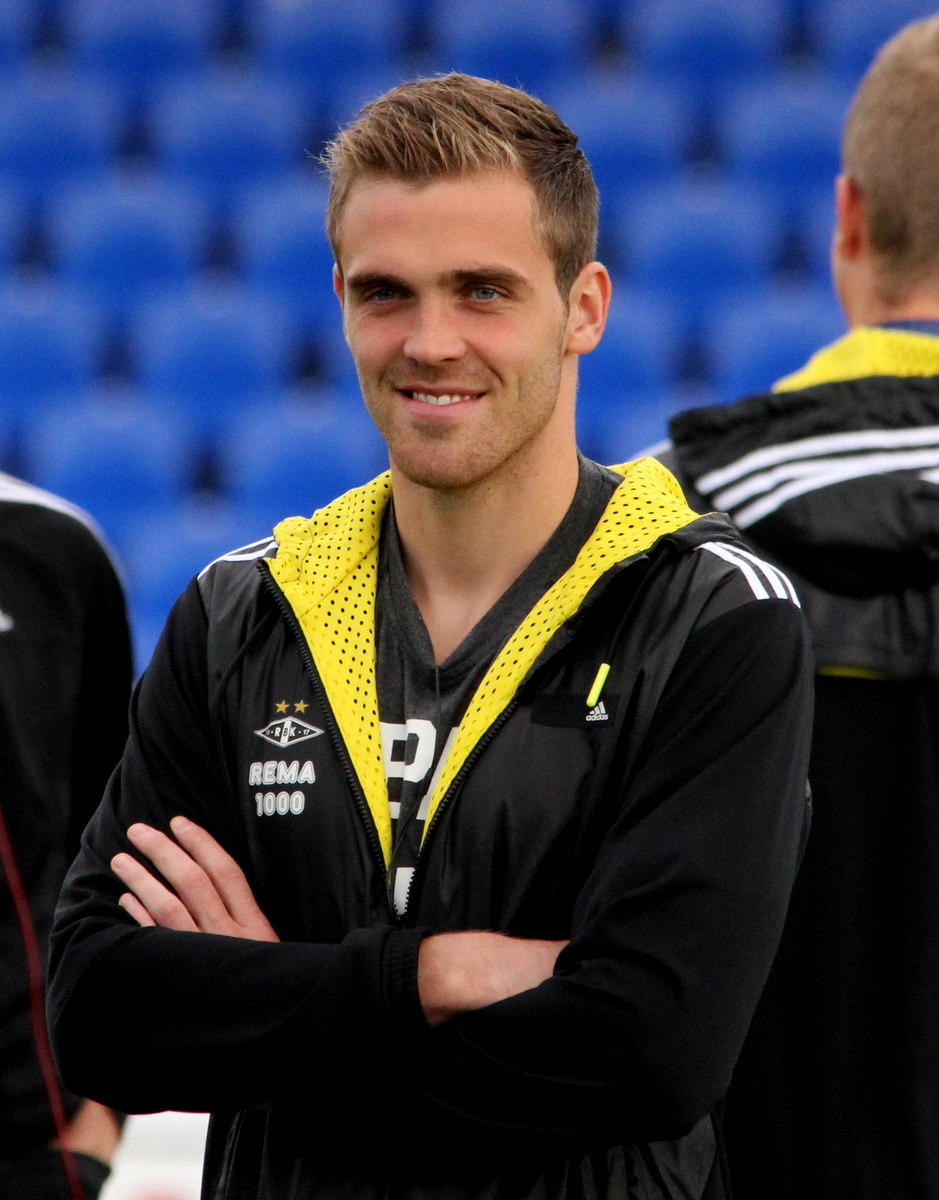
- Moe in 2013

Personal information
- Full name: Brede Mathias Moe
- Date of birth: 15 December 1991 (age 34)
- Place of birth: Flatanger Municipality, Norway
- Height: 1.84 m (6 ft 0 in)
- Position: Defender

Senior career*
Years	Team	Apps	(Gls)
2009–2010	Steinkjer		
2011–2012	Ranheim	53	(7)
2013–2014	Rosenborg	3	(0)
2014	→ Bodø/Glimt (loan)	26	(2)
2015–2025	Bodø/Glimt	186	(9)

International career
2013	Norway U-21	1	(0)
- * Club domestic league appearances and goals

Brede Mathias Moe (born 15 December 1991) is a Norwegian former professional footballer who played as a defender.

== Career ==
On 6 March 2014, Moe joined Bodø/Glimt from Rosenborg on loan for the 2014 season. His loan move was made permanent on 17 November 2014 for an undisclosed fee.

On 1 January 2026, Moe decided to retire from football, he continues in Bodø/Glimt joining the academy as a coach.

== Career statistics ==
As of match played 30 November 2025

Appearances and goals by club, season and competition
Club	Season	League			Norwegian Cup		Europe		Total	
Club	Season	Division	Apps	Goals	Apps	Goals	Apps	Goals	Apps	Goals
Ranheim	2011	Norwegian First Division	24	2	2	0	–		26	2
Ranheim	2012	Norwegian First Division	29	5	0	0	–		29	5
Ranheim	Total		53	7	2	0	–		55	7
Rosenborg	2013	Tippeligaen	3	0	4	1	1 (Note: Appearance in UEFA Europa League)	0	8	1
Bodø/Glimt (loan)	2014	Tippeligaen	26	2	4	1	–		30	3
Bodø/Glimt	2015	Tippeligaen	27	3	2	0	–		29	3
Bodø/Glimt	2016	Tippeligaen	17	0	2	0	–		19	0
Bodø/Glimt	2017	Norwegian First Division	6	1	0	0	–		6	1
Bodø/Glimt	2018	Eliteserien	20	1	0	0	–		20	1
Bodø/Glimt	2019	Eliteserien	16	0	0	0	–		16	0
Bodø/Glimt	2020	Eliteserien	13	0	0	0	1	0	14	0
Bodø/Glimt	2021	Eliteserien	24	2	0	0	19 (Note: Two appearances in UEFA Champions League, seventeen appearances and one goal in UEFA Europa Conference League)	1	45	3
Bodø/Glimt	2022	Eliteserien	15	1	2	0	7 (Note: Two appearances in UEFA Champions League, three appearances in UEFA Europa League, two appearances in UEFA Europa Conference League)	0	24	1
Bodø/Glimt	2023	Eliteserien	24	1	4	0	14 (Note: Appearances in UEFA Europa Conference League)	0	42	1
Bodø/Glimt	2024	Eliteserien	19	0	1	0	7 (Note: Four appearances in UEFA Champions League, three appearances in UEFA Europa League)	0	27	0
Bodø/Glimt	2025	Eliteserien	6	0	3	0	2 (Note: Appearances in UEFA Champions League)	0	11	0
Bodø/Glimt	Total		213	11	18	1	50	1	291	13
Career total			269	18	24	2	51	1	344	21

== Honours ==
Bodø/Glimt

- Eliteserien: 2020, 2021, 2023, 2024
- Norwegian First Division: 2017
