= Isak Amundsen =

Norwegian footballer (born 1999)

Personal information
- Full name: Isak Helstad Amundsen
- Date of birth: 14 October 1999 (age 27)
- Place of birth: Brønnøysund, Norway
- Height: 1.80 m (5 ft 11 in)
- Position: Defender

Team information
- Current team: Fredrikstad
- Number: 38

Youth career
- –2016: Brønnøysund
- 2018–2020: Bodø/Glimt

Senior career*
Years	Team	Apps	(Gls)
2014–2018	Brønnøysund	54	(12)
2020–2024	Bodø/Glimt	31	(2)
2021	→ Tromsø (loan)	25	(1)
2024–2026	Molde	48	(0)
2026–	Fredrikstad	8	(0)
- * Club domestic league appearances and goals as of 17 October 2026

Isak Helstad Amundsen (born 14 October 1999) is a Norwegian professional footballer who plays as a defender for Fredrikstad.

== Career ==
Amundsen was born in Brønnøysund. He made his senior debut for Brønnøysund on 31 May 2014 against Drag; Brønnøysund won 9–0.

On 18 February 2020, Amundsen signed his first professional contract with Bodø/Glimt. Amundsen made his senior debut for Bodø/Glimt on 1 July 2020 against Odd, with Bodø/Glimt winning 4–0.

After winning the Eliteserien twice with Bodø/Glimt, Amundsen moved to Molde before the start of the 2024 season.

== Personal life ==
On his father's side, he is a first cousin of cross-country skiers Hedda and Harald Østberg Amundsen.

== Career statistics ==
As of 17 October 2026

Appearances and goals by club, season and competition
Club	Season	League			National cup		Continental		Total	
Club	Season	Division	Apps	Goals	Apps	Goals	Apps	Goals	Apps	Goals
Brønnøysund	2014	4. divisjon	3	0	0	0	—		3	0
Brønnøysund	2015	4. divisjon	4	0	0	0	—		4	0
Brønnøysund	2016	3. divisjon	21	0	1	0	—		22	0
Brønnøysund	2017	4. divisjon	19	11	1	0	—		20	11
Brønnøysund	2018	4. divisjon	7	1	1	0	—		8	1
Brønnøysund	Total		54	12	3	0	—		57	12
Bodø/Glimt	2019	Eliteserien	0	0	0	0	—		0	0
Bodø/Glimt	2020	Eliteserien	10	0	—		0	0	10	0
Bodø/Glimt	2022	Eliteserien	14	2	2	2	9 (Note: Seven appearances in the UEFA Champions League, and two appearances in the UEFA Europa League)	0	25	4
Bodø/Glimt	2023	Eliteserien	7	0	8	1	4 (Note: Appearances in the UEFA Europa Conference League)	0	19	1
Bodø/Glimt	2024	Eliteserien	0	0	0	0	1	0	1	0
Bodø/Glimt	Total		31	2	10	3	14	0	55	5
Tromsø (loan)	2021	Eliteserien	25	1	1	0	—		26	1
Molde	2024	Eliteserien	26	0	5	0	7	0	38	0
Molde	2025	Eliteserien	16	0	4	1	3	0	23	1
Molde	2026	Eliteserien	6	0	0	0	0	0	6	0
Molde	Total		48	0	9	1	10	0	67	1
Fredrikstad	2026	Eliteserien	8	0	1	0	—		9	0
Career total			166	15	24	4	24	0	214	19

== Honours ==
Bodø/Glimt

- Eliteserien: 2020, 2023
- Norwegian Football Cup runner-up: 2021, 2023
