= Odin Bjørtuft =

Norwegian footballer (born 1998)

Personal information
- Full name: Odin Lurås Bjørtuft
- Date of birth: 19 December 1998 (age 27)
- Place of birth: Skien, Norway
- Height: 1.85 m (6 ft 1 in)
- Position: Centre-back

Team information
- Current team: Bodø/Glimt
- Number: 4

Youth career
- Hei
- 2013–2014: Eidanger
- 2015–2017: Odd

Senior career*
Years	Team	Apps	(Gls)
2014	Eidanger	14	(0)
2018–2019	Odd 2	29	(1)
2018–2022	Odd	101	(2)
2023–	Bodø/Glimt	107	(8)

International career^{‡}
2019	Norway U21	3	(0)
2026–	Norway	1	(0)
- * Club domestic league appearances and goals as of 20 November 2026 ‡ National team caps and goals as of 31 March 2026

Odin Lurås Bjørtuft (born 19 December 1998) is a Norwegian professional footballer who plays as a centre-back for Bodø/Glimt and the Norway national team. (Note: Odin Bjørtuft at Soccerway. Retrieved 2 July 2018.)

== Career ==
After playing for Odd, Bjørtuft signed for Bodø/Glimt for the 2023 season.

== Career statistics ==
As of match played 20 November 2026

Appearances and goals by club, season and competition
Club	Season	League			Norwegian Cup		Continental		Total	
Club	Season	Division	Apps	Goals	Apps	Goals	Apps	Goals	Apps	Goals
Odd	2018	Eliteserien	2	0	1	0	–		3	0
Odd	2019	Eliteserien	14	0	4	0	–		18	0
Odd	2020	Eliteserien	30	1	0	0	–		30	1
Odd	2021	Eliteserien	28	0	3	0	–		31	0
Odd	2022	Eliteserien	27	1	3	2	–		30	3
Odd	Total		101	2	11	2	0	0	112	4
Bodø/Glimt	2023	Eliteserien	25	0	8	1	11 (Note: Appearances in UEFA Europa Conference League)	0	44	1
Bodø/Glimt	2024	Eliteserien	27	1	2	0	16 (Note: Four appearances and one goal in UEFA Champions League, twelve appearances and one goal in UEFA Europa League)	2	45	3
Bodø/Glimt	2025	Eliteserien	28	6	2	0	8 (Note: Appearances in UEFA Champions League)	1	38	7
Bodø/Glimt	2026	Eliteserien	27	1	4	0	13	1	44	2
Bodø/Glimt	Total		107	8	16	1	48	4	171	13
Career total			208	10	27	3	48	4	283	17
