= Albert Grønbæk =

Danish footballer (born 2001)

Personal information
- Full name: Albert Grønbæk Erlykke
- Date of birth: 23 May 2001 (age 25)
- Place of birth: Risskov, Denmark
- Height: 1.76 m (5 ft 9 in)
- Position: Midfielder

Team information
- Current team: Hamburger SV
- Number: 11

Youth career
- –2015: VRI
- 2015–2020: AGF

Senior career*
Years	Team	Apps	(Gls)
2019–2022	AGF	74	(8)
2022–2024	Bodø/Glimt	55	(19)
2024–2026	Rennes	16	(2)
2025	→ Southampton (loan)	4	(0)
2025–2026	→ Genoa (loan)	4	(0)
2026	→ Hamburger SV (loan)	7	(1)
2026–	Hamburger SV	8	(1)

International career^{‡}
2019	Denmark U18	2	(0)
2019–2020	Denmark U19	4	(1)
2021–2022	Denmark U21	7	(1)
2024–	Denmark	10	(1)
- * Club domestic league appearances and goals as of 20:15, 11 November 2026 (UTC) ‡ National team caps and goals as of 22:40, 26 September 2026 (UTC)

Albert Grønbæk Erlykke (Danish pronunciation: [ˈæl.pɛɐ̯t ˈkʁɶnˌpɛɡ]; born 23 May 2001) is a Danish professional footballer who plays as a midfielder for Bundesliga club Hamburger SV and the Denmark national team. A versatile player, he can be deployed as a central midfielder, attacking midfielder or left winger.

== Club career ==
=== AGF ===
Grønbæk started his career with local club Vejlby-Risskov Idrætsklub (VRI) before transferring to AGF in 2015 on a youth contract. Grønbæk made his debut for AGF in July 2020, when he came on in the 71st minute in a 3–2 win against AaB. Ahead of the 2020–21 Danish Superliga, Grønbæk was officially moved into the AGF first team. In September 2020, he scored his first goal for the club in a 4–2 win against OB.

=== FK Bodø/Glimt ===
On 13 August 2022, it was confirmed that Grønbæk had been sold to Eliteserien club FK Bodø/Glimt, signing a deal until June 2027. AGF also stated that the sale of Grønbæk was a new record for the club.

=== Rennes ===
On 15 July 2024, Grønbæk joined Ligue 1 side Rennes on a five-year deal. He scored his first goal for the club on 15 September 2024 in a 3–0 victory against Montpellier.

==== Southampton (loan) ====
On 21 January 2025, Grønbæk joined Premier League side Southampton on loan for the remainder of the 2024–25 season. He made his debut for the club on 1 February 2025 in a 2–1 away victory against Ipswich Town.

==== Genoa (loan) ====
On 23 June 2025, Grønbæk agreed to join Genoa of Serie A on a season-long loan, effective 1 July. The deal included an option to buy, which would become an obligation should certain performance-related conditions be met.

=== Hamburger SV ===
On 31 January 2026, Grønbæk moved on a new loan to German club Hamburger SV. He joined Hamburger SV on a permanent basis at the end of the loan.

== International career ==
Grønbæk was called up to the senior Denmark national team for the first time for the Nations League games against Switzerland and Serbia in September 2024. He debuted on 5 September 2024 against Switzerland at the Parken Stadium in Copenhagen, in which he played 81 minutes and received the Man of the Match award as Denmark won 2–0. Three days later, he scored his first international goal as Denmark defeated Serbia 2–0.

== Career statistics ==
=== Club ===
As of match played 6 November 2026

Appearances and goals by club, season and competition
Club	Season	League			National cup (Note: Includes Danish Cup, Norwegian Cup, FA Cup, Coppa Italia)		Europe		Other		Total	
Club	Season	Division	Apps	Goals	Apps	Goals	Apps	Goals	Apps	Goals	Apps	Goals
AGF	2019–20	Danish Superliga	8	0	1	0	—		—		9	0
AGF	2020–21	Danish Superliga	31	5	6	0	1 (Note: Appearance(s) in UEFA Europa Conference League)	0	1 (Note: Appearance in Danish Superliga Europa League play-offs)	0	39	5
AGF	2021–22	Danish Superliga	31	3	1	0	2	0	—		34	3
AGF	2022–23	Danish Superliga	4	0	0	0	—		—		4	0
AGF	Total		74	8	8	0	3	0	1	0	86	8
Bodø/Glimt	2022	Eliteserien	12	2	0	0	10 (Note: Two appearances and one goal in UEFA Champions League, six appearances and one goal in UEFA Europa League, two appearances in UEFA Europa Conference League)	2	—		22	4
Bodø/Glimt	2023	Eliteserien	28	9	8	3	14	6	—		50	18
Bodø/Glimt	2024	Eliteserien	15	8	1	0	0	0	—		16	8
Bodø/Glimt	Total		55	19	9	3	24	8	—		87	30
Rennes	2024–25	Ligue 1	16	2	2	0	—		—		18	2
Southampton (loan)	2024–25	Premier League	4	0	1	0	—		—		5	0
Genoa (loan)	2025–26	Serie A	4	0	2	0	—		—		6	0
Hamburger SV (loan)	2025–26	Bundesliga	7	1	—		—		—		7	1
Hamburger SV	2026–27	Bundesliga	8	1	2	2	—		—		10	3
Hamburger SV	Hamburger SV total		15	2	2	2	—		—		17	4
Career total			168	31	24	5	27	8	1	0	220	44

=== International ===
As of match played 26 September 2026

Appearances and goals by national team and year
National team	Year	Apps	Goals
Denmark	2024	6	1
Denmark	2025	2	0
Denmark	2026	2	0
Total		10	1

As of match played 3 June 2026. Denmark score listed first, score column indicates score after each Grønbæk goal.

International goals by date, venue, cap, opponent, score, result and competition
No.	Date	Venue	Cap	Opponent	Score	Result	Competition
1	8 September 2024	Parken Stadium, Copenhagen, Denmark	2	Serbia	1–0	2–0	2024–25 UEFA Nations League A

== Honours ==
Bodø/Glimt

- Eliteserien: 2023, 2024
