= Oscar Kapskarmo =

Norwegian footballer (born 2000)

Personal information
- Full name: Oscar Forsmo Kapskarmo
- Date of birth: 5 January 2000 (age 26)
- Place of birth: Hattfjelldal, Norway
- Height: 1.90 m (6 ft 3 in)
- Position: Forward

Team information
- Current team: Sandefjord
- Number: 9

Youth career
- Hattfjelldal
- Mosjøen

Senior career*
Years	Team	Apps	(Gls)
2017–2021	Mosjøen	40	(24)
2022–2023	Junkeren	36	(24)
2023–2024	Bodø/Glimt	17	(1)
2024	→ Kongsvinger (loan)	10	(2)
2025–2026	Egersund	38	(16)
2026	→ Sandefjord (loan)	5	(1)
2026–	Sandefjord	3	(1)
- * Club domestic league appearances and goals as of 31 October 2026

Oscar Forsmo Kapskarmo (born 5 January 2000) is a Norwegian professional footballer who plays for Eliteserien club Sandefjord.

== Career ==
Kapskarmo played for Mosjøen. After impressing for Mosjøen he signed with Junkeren in January 2022 signing a contract until 2023.

He made his professional debut for Bodø/Glimt when appearing as a substitute in an Eliteserien league match against Vålerenga on 24 September 2023 in a 4–2 victory at the Aspmyra Stadion.

== Career statistics ==
As of match played 31 October 2026

Appearances and goals by club, season and competition
Club	Season	League			National Cup		Continental		Total	
Club	Season	Division	Apps	Goals	Apps	Goals	Apps	Goals	Apps	Goals
Mosjøen	2017	3. divisjon	21	1	4	1	–		25	2
Mosjøen	2018	4. divisjon	7	4	0	0	–		7	4
Mosjøen	2019	4. divisjon	3	4	0	0	–		3	4
Mosjøen	2021	4. divisjon	9	15	0	0	–		9	15
Mosjøen	Total		40	24	4	1	–		44	25
Junkeren	2022	3. divisjon	20	16	2	1	–		22	17
Junkeren	2023	2. divisjon	14	8	2	3	–		16	11
Junkeren	Total		36	24	4	4	–		40	28
Bodø/Glimt	2023	Eliteserien	6	1	2	0	6	1	14	2
Bodø/Glimt	2024	Eliteserien	11	0	3	1	5	1	19	2
Bodø/Glimt	Total		17	1	5	1	11	2	33	4
Kongsvinger (loan)	2024	OBOS-ligaen	10	2	0	0	–		10	2
Egersund	2025	OBOS-ligaen	22	11	6	4	–		28	15
Egersund	2026	OBOS-ligaen	16	5	1	1	–		17	6
Egersund	Total		38	16	7	5	–		45	21
Sandefjord (loan)	2026	Eliteserien	5	1	0	0	–		5	1
Sandefjord	2026	Eliteserien	3	1	1	0	–		4	1
Sandefjord	Total		8	2	1	0	–		9	2
Career total			149	69	21	11	11	2	181	83

== Honours ==
Bodø/Glimt

- Eliteserien: 2023, 2024
