= Adam Sørensen =

Danish footballer (born 2000)

Personal information
- Date of birth: 11 November 2000 (age 26)
- Place of birth: Herlev, Denmark
- Position: Left-back

Team information
- Current team: OB
- Number: 3

Youth career
- –2011: Herlev IF
- 2011–2018: Lyngby

Senior career*
Years	Team	Apps	(Gls)
2018–2023	Lyngby	75	(3)
2023–2024	Bodø/Glimt	37	(0)
2025–	OB	42	(1)

International career
2015	Denmark U16	2	(0)
2017	Denmark U17	1	(0)
2018–2019	Denmark U19	7	(0)
- * Club domestic league appearances and goals as of 19 May 2026

Adam Sørensen (Danish: [ˈɛːtɑm ˈsɶɐ̯ˀn̩sn̩]; born 11 November 2000) is a Danish professional footballer who plays as a left-back for Danish Superliga club OB.

== Club career ==
Sørensen progressed through the Lyngby Boldklub youth academy after coming to the club from hometown side Herlev IF at U12 level. On 3 March 2018, he made his senior debut for the club in the Danish Superliga against Hobro IK at age 17 years and 116 days old, becoming the youngest player to debut for the club in the Superliga.

He suffered relegation to the Danish 1st Division with the club on 9 May 2021 after a loss to last placed AC Horsens. He was a starter during the 2021–22 campaign, in which Lyngby managed immediately to win promotion back to the Superliga. Sørensen finished the season with 35 total appearances in which he scored one goal.

On 12 January 2023, Sørensen was sold to Norwegian Eliteserien side FK Bodø/Glimt for a fee around 7,5 million DKK. At the end of December 2024, Sørensen joined Danish club OB on a 4,5-year contract.

== International career ==
On 23 August 2018, Sørensen was called up for the Denmark U19 team. He made his debut on 7 September, when he came on as a substitute at halftime for Lukas Klitten in a 2–1 win over Norway at an international tournament in Gävle, Sweden.

== Career statistics ==
As of match played 12 April 2026

Appearances and goals by club, season and competition
Club	Season	League			Cup		Europe		Other		Total	
Club	Season	Division	Apps	Goals	Apps	Goals	Apps	Goals	Apps	Goals	Apps	Goals
Lyngby	2017–18	Danish Superliga	10	1	0	0	—		1 (Note: Appearances in the Superliga play-offs)	0	11	1
Lyngby	2018–19	Danish 1st Division	16	1	1	0	—		0	0	17	1
Lyngby	2019–20	Danish Superliga	1	0	1	0	—		—		2	0
Lyngby	2020–21	Danish Superliga	0	0	0	0	—		—		0	0
Lyngby	2021–22	Danish 1st Division	32	1	3	0	—		—		35	1
Lyngby	2022–23	Danish Superliga	16	0	1	0	—		—		17	0
Lyngby	Total		75	3	6	0	—		1	0	82	3
Bodø/Glimt	2023	Eliteserien	21	0	9	1	7	1	—		37	2
Bodø/Glimt	2024	Eliteserien	16	0	2	0	4	0	—		22	0
Bodø/Glimt	Total		37	0	11	1	11	1	—		59	2
OB	2024–25	Danish 1st Division	14	0	0	0	—		—		14	0
OB	2025–26	Danish Superliga	24	1	2	0	—		—		26	1
OB	Total		38	1	2	0	—		—		40	1
Career total			150	4	19	1	11	1	1	0	181	6

== Honours ==
Bodø/Glimt

- Eliteserien: 2023, 2024

OB

- Danish 1st Division: 2024–25
