= Sondre Sørli =

Norwegian footballer (born 1995)

Personal information
- Date of birth: 30 October 1995 (age 31)
- Place of birth: Kristiansund, Norway
- Height: 1.78 m (5 ft 10 in)
- Position: Midfielder

Team information
- Current team: Sarpsborg 08
- Number: 10

Youth career
- –2011: Clausenengen
- 2012–2014: Kristiansund

Senior career*
Years	Team	Apps	(Gls)
2014–2020	Kristiansund	113	(14)
2021–2025	Bodø/Glimt	68	(7)
2025–	Sarpsborg 08	39	(10)
- * Club domestic league appearances and goals as of 1 Novembet 2026

Sondre Sørli (born 30 October 1995) is a Norwegian professional footballer who plays as a midfielder for Sarpsborg 08.

== Career statistics ==
=== Club ===
As of match played 1 Novembet 2026

Appearances and goals by club, season and competition
Club	Season	League			National cup		Continental		Total	
Club	Season	Division	Apps	Goals	Apps	Goals	Apps	Goals	Apps	Goals
Kristiansund	2014	1. divisjon	0	0	1	0	–		1	0
Kristiansund	2015	1. divisjon	7	0	2	0	–		9	0
Kristiansund	2016	1. divisjon	12	2	0	0	–		12	2
Kristiansund	2017	Eliteserien	23	3	3	0	–		26	3
Kristiansund	2018	Eliteserien	23	1	3	1	–		26	2
Kristiansund	2019	Eliteserien	23	5	2	1	–		25	6
Kristiansund	2020	Eliteserien	25	3	0	0	–		25	3
Kristiansund	Total		113	14	11	2	0	0	124	16
Bodø/Glimt	2021	Eliteserien	11	3	0	0	–		11	3
Bodø/Glimt	2022	Eliteserien	17	1	6	0	5	0	28	1
Bodø/Glimt	2023	Eliteserien	18	3	6	0	9	2	33	5
Bodø/Glimt	2024	Eliteserien	16	0	3	4	6	0	25	4
Bodø/Glimt	2025	Eliteserien	6	0	3	1	7	0	16	1
Bodø/Glimt	Total		68	7	18	5	27	2	113	14
Sarpsborg 08	2025	Eliteserien	14	4	1	0	–		15	4
Sarpsborg 08	2026	Eliteserien	25	6	3	2	–		28	8
Sarpsborg 08	Total		39	10	4	2	–		43	12
Career total			220	31	33	9	27	2	280	42

== Honours ==
Bodø/Glimt

- Eliteserien: 2021, 2023, 2024
