= Fredrik Sjøvold =

Norwegian footballer (born 2003)

Personal information
- Date of birth: 17 August 2003 (age 23)
- Place of birth: Trondheim, Norway
- Height: 1.68 m (5 ft 6 in)
- Position: Right back

Team information
- Current team: FK Bodø/Glimt
- Number: 20

Youth career
- Sjetne
- –2018: Trygg/Lade
- 2019: Rosenborg
- 2020: Tiller

Senior career*
Years	Team	Apps	(Gls)
2021	Tiller	12	(0)
2022–	Bodø/Glimt	109	(8)

International career^{‡}
2022–2023	Norway U20	4	(0)
2023–2024	Norway U21	7	(0)
- * Club domestic league appearances and goals as of 20 November 2026 ‡ National team caps and goals as of 25 October 2025

Fredrik Sjøvold (born 17 August 2003) is a Norwegian footballer who plays as a right back for Eliteserien club FK Bodø/Glimt.

== Career ==
He started his youth career in Sjetne IL, moving on to SK Trygg/Lade where Jon Olav Hjelde was among his coaches. Sjøvold was in the youth system at Rosenborg but made the decision to develop his game in the Norwegian third division with Tiller IL, choosing to play senior football rather than continuing with youth football with Rosenborg. After impressing for Tiller in 2021 many options were open for Sjøvold and he signed with FK Bodø/Glimt in January 2022 signing a contract until 2025.

He made his professional debut for Bodø/Glimt when appearing as a substitute in an Eliteserien league match against FK Jerv on 23 July 2022 in a 5–0 victory at the Aspmyra Stadion.

== Career statistics ==
=== Club ===
As of match played 20 November 2026

Appearances and goals by club, season and competition
Club	Season	League			National cup		Continental		Total	
Club	Season	Division	Apps	Goals	Apps	Goals	Apps	Goals	Apps	Goals
Tiller IL	2021	3. divisjon	12	0	2	0	–		14	0
Bodø/Glimt	2022	Eliteserien	4	0	2	0	0	0	6	0
Bodø/Glimt	2023	Eliteserien	20	0	7	1	12	0	39	1
Bodø/Glimt	2024	Eliteserien	28	1	2	0	12	0	42	1
Bodø/Glimt	2025	Eliteserien	30	4	3	0	18	0	51	4
Bodø/Glimt	2026	Eliteserien	27	3	3	0	14	2	44	5
Bodø/Glimt	Total		109	8	17	1	56	2	182	11
Career total			121	8	19	1	56	2	196	11

== Honours ==
Bodø/Glimt

- Eliteserien: 2023, 2024
- Norwegian Football Cup: 2025–26

Individual

- Eliteserien Young Player of the Month: September 2024
