= Nino Žugelj =

Slovenian footballer (born 2000)

Personal information
- Date of birth: 23 May 2000 (age 26)
- Place of birth: Slovenj Gradec, Slovenia
- Height: 1.88 m (6 ft 2 in)
- Position: Winger

Team information
- Current team: IFK Göteborg (on loan from Djurgårdens IF)
- Number: 11

Youth career
- 2006–2011: Slovenj Gradec
- 2011–2016: Dravograd
- 2016–2019: Maribor

Senior career*
Years	Team	Apps	(Gls)
2019–2022	Maribor	33	(5)
2020	→ Drava Ptuj (loan)	1	(0)
2020–2021	→ Bravo (loan)	18	(0)
2022–2025	Bodø/Glimt	33	(6)
2022	Bodø/Glimt 2	3	(3)
2025–	Djurgårdens IF	14	(2)
2026–	→ IFK Göteborg (loan)	3	(1)

International career
2017	Slovenia U17	4	(0)
2017–2018	Slovenia U18	3	(0)
2017–2019	Slovenia U19	4	(0)
2021–2022	Slovenia U21	8	(0)
2024	Slovenia	1	(0)
- * Club domestic league appearances and goals as of 19:01, 19 September 2026 (UTC)

Nino Žugelj (born 23 May 2000) is a Slovenian professional footballer who plays as a winger for Allsvenskan club IFK Göteborg, on loan from Djurgårdens IF.

== Club career ==
Žugelj made his senior debut for Maribor on 23 February 2019 in the Slovenian PrvaLiga match against Mura, before spending time on loan at Drava Ptuj and Bravo. He scored his first goal for Maribor on 8 July 2021 against Urartu in the UEFA Europa Conference League qualifiers.

On 1 August 2022, Žugelj joined Eliteserien side Bodø/Glimt for an alleged transfer fee of around €700,000.

On 5 February 2025, he joined Allsvenskan team Djurgårdens IF on a four-year contract.

== Career statistics ==
As of 28 August 2026

Appearances and goals by club, season and competition
Club	Season	League			National cup		Continental		Total	
Club	Season	Division	Apps	Goals	Apps	Goals	Apps	Goals	Apps	Goals
Maribor	2018–19	Slovenian PrvaLiga	3	0	0	0	—		3	0
Maribor	2019–20	Slovenian PrvaLiga	0	0	0	0	0	0	0	0
Maribor	2021–22	Slovenian PrvaLiga	29	4	1	0	4	2	34	6
Maribor	2022–23	Slovenian PrvaLiga	1	1	0	0	4	0	5	1
Maribor	Total		33	5	1	0	8	2	42	7
Drava Ptuj (loan)	2019–20	Slovenian Second League	1	0	—		—		1	0
Bravo (loan)	2020–21	Slovenian PrvaLiga	18	0	1	0	—		19	0
Bodø/Glimt	2022	Eliteserien	7	1	0	0	1	1	8	2
Bodø/Glimt	2023	Eliteserien	12	2	6	5	7	0	25	7
Bodø/Glimt	2024	Eliteserien	14	3	2	0	3	0	19	3
Bodø/Glimt	2025	Eliteserien	0	0	0	0	2	0	2	0
Bodø/Glimt	Total		33	6	8	5	13	1	54	12
Djurgårdens IF	2025	Allsvenskan	7	1	3	1	3	0	13	2
Djurgårdens IF	2026	Allsvenskan	7	1	4	3	—		11	4
Djurgårdens IF	Total		14	2	7	4	3	0	24	6
Career total			99	13	17	9	24	3	140	25

== Honours ==
Maribor

- Slovenian PrvaLiga: 2018–19, 2021–22

Bodø/Glimt

- Eliteserien: 2023, 2024
