= 2021 Norwegian Football Cup final =

- Event: 2021 Norwegian Football Cup
Bodø/Glimt	Molde
0	1
- Date: 1 May 2022
- Venue: Ullevaal Stadion, Oslo
- Referee: Rohit Saggi
- Attendance: 19,657

The 2021 Norwegian Football Cup final was the final match of the 2021 Norwegian Football Cup, the 115th season of the Norwegian Football Cup, the premier Norwegian football cup competition organized by the Norwegian Football Federation (NFF). The match was played on 1 May 2022 at the Ullevaal Stadion in Oslo, and opposed two Eliteserien sides, Bodø/Glimt and Molde.

Molde defeated Bodø/Glimt 1–0 to claim the Norwegian Cup for the fifth time in their history, the first time since 2014. Sivert Mannsverk scored the winning goal, a penalty after 76 minutes.

== Route to the final ==
Note: In all results below, the score of the finalist is given first.

Bodø/Glimt		Round	Molde	
Rana (D3); A 4–1	Nordås 59', 62', 78' (pen.), M. Bjørnmyr 65' (o.g.)	First round	Spjelkavik (D3); A 4–1	Grødem 32', Fofana 62', Brynhildsen 64', Tjåland 90+3'
Junkeren (D3); A 3–1	Hagen 3', Berg 67', Nordås 72'	Second round	Hødd (D2); A 2–1	Grødem 35' (pen.), 90+1' (pen.)
Alta (D2); A 2–1	Kvile 45', Sampsted 50'	Third round	Bryne (D1); A 4–1	Eikrem 12', Grødem 26', Andersen 63', Bjørnbak 75'
Aalesund (ES); A w/o	N/A	Fourth round	Odd (ES); H 3–2 (a.e.t.)	Andersen 82', Fofana 116', Haugen 119'
Lillestrøm (ES); H 4–1	Espejord 37', Hagen 53', Pellegrino 87', Boniface 90+2'	Quarter-final	Sarpsborg 08 (ES); H 4–2	Brynhildsen 21', Eikrem 48', Andersen 80', Linnes 90+2'
Viking (ES); H 2–1	Espejord 17', Koomson 38'	Semi-final	Strømsgodset (ES); H 3–0	Eikrem 58', 78', Leifsson 88' (o.g.)

Key:

- ES = Eliteserien team
- D1 = 1. divisjon team
- D2 = 2. divisjon team
- D3 = 3. divisjon team
- H = Home
- A = Away
- a.e.t. = After extra time

== Match ==
=== Details ===
1 May 2022
16:00 CEST (UTC+2)

Bodø/Glimt	0–1	Molde
	Report	Mannsverk 76' (pen.)

Ullevaal Stadion, Oslo
Attendance: 19,657
Referee: Rohit Saggi (Drafn)

Bodø/Glimt	Molde

Bodø/Glimt:
GK	12	(Russia) Nikita Haikin	(yellow card) 74'
RB	3	(Iceland) Alfons Sampsted
CB	18	(Norway) Brede Moe
CB	4	(Norway) Marius Høibråten
LB	5	(Norway) Brice Wembangomo		(substituted off) 83'
CM	10	(Norway) Hugo Vetlesen		(substituted off) 83'
CM	23	(Norway) Elias Hagen		(substituted off) 46'
CM	14	(Norway) Ulrik Saltnes (c)
RW	9	(Norway) Ola Solbakken
CF	11	(Norway) Runar Espejord		(substituted off) 46'
LW	7	(Norway) Amahl Pellegrino		(substituted off) 83'
Substitutions:
GK	22	(Netherlands) Joshua Smits
DF	2	(Denmark) Japhet Sery Larsen
FW	8	(Nigeria) Victor Boniface		(substituted in) 46'
MF	15	(Norway) Anders Konradsen
MF	17	(Norway) Gaute Vetti		(substituted in) 46'
MF	19	(Norway) Sondre Brunstad Fet		(substituted in) 83'
DF	26	(Norway) Sigurd Kvile
FW	27	(Norway) Sondre Sørli		(substituted in) 83'
FW	77	(Ghana) Gilbert Koomson		(substituted in) 83'
Head coach:
(Norway) Kjetil Knutsen

Molde:
GK	1	(Norway) Jacob Karlstrøm
CB	4	(Denmark) Benjamin Hansen	(yellow card) 67'
CB	2	(Norway) Martin Bjørnbak
CB	3	(Norway) Birk Risa
RM	21	(Norway) Martin Linnes
CM	8	(Norway) Sivert Mannsverk
CM	25	(Norway) Emil Breivik	(yellow card) 45'
LM	28	(Norway) Kristoffer Haugen		(substituted off) 80'
AM	23	(Norway) Eirik Ulland Andersen		(substituted off) 34'
CF	7	(Norway) Magnus Wolff Eikrem (c)		(substituted off) 80'
CF	11	(Norway) Ola Brynhildsen		(substituted off) 85'
Substitutions:
GK	26	(Norway) Oliver Petersen
MF	14	(Norway) Erling Knudtzon		(substituted in) 80'
MF	15	(Norway) Markus Kaasa		(substituted in) 34'
FW	17	(Norway) Rafik Zekhnini		(substituted in) 85'
DF	19	(Norway) Eirik Haugan
FW	22	(Norway) Magnus Grødem		(substituted in) 80'
MF	24	(Norway) Johan Johanessen Bakke
FW	30	(Ivory Coast) Mathis Bolly
DF	31	(Norway) Mathias Fjørtoft Løvik
Head coach:
(Norway) Erling Moe

MATCH OFFICIALS

- Assistant referees:
  - Geir-Oskar Isaksen (Furuflaten IL)
  - Isaak Elias Skjeseth Bashevkin (IF Ready)
- Fourth official: Kristoffer Hagenes (TIL Hovding)

MATCH RULES

- 90 minutes.
- 30 minutes of extra-time if necessary.
- Penalty shoot-out if scores still level.
- Nine named substitutes.
- Maximum of five substitutions.
