= 2021 FK Bodø/Glimt season =

Bodø/Glimt
2021 season
- President: Hege Leirfall Ingebrigtsen
- Manager: Kjetil Knutsen
- Stadium: Aspmyra Stadion
- Eliteserien: 1st
- Norwegian Cup: Fourth round
- UEFA Champions League: First qualifying round
- UEFA Europa Conference League: Knockout round play-offs
- Top goalscorer: League: Erik Botheim (15); All: Erik Botheim (23)
Home colours	Away colours

The 2021 season was the club's fourth straight campaign in the Eliteserien since their promotion in 2017. Bodø/Glimt entered the campaign as league champions, winning their first ever Norwegian title in 2020. The start of the season was postponed from 5 April to 8 May due to the COVID-19 pandemic, where Glimt first played their local rivals Tromsø on 9 May 2021.

On 12 December 2021, Bodø/Glimt retained their title as Eliteserien champions with a 3–0 win over Mjøndalen in the final match of the league season.

== Current squad ==
As of 16 September 2021

Note: Flags indicate national team as defined under FIFA eligibility rules; some limited exceptions apply. Players may hold more than one non-FIFA nationality.

No.	Pos.	Nation	Player
2	DF	NOR	Marius Lode
3	DF	ISL	Alfons Sampsted
4	DF	NOR	Marius Høibråten
5	DF	NOR	Fredrik André Bjørkan
7	MF	NOR	Patrick Berg (vice-captain)
8	FW	NGA	Victor Boniface
9	FW	NOR	Ola Solbakken
10	MF	NOR	Hugo Vetlesen
11	FW	NOR	Amahl Pellegrino
12	GK	RUS	Nikita Khaykin
14	MF	NOR	Ulrik Saltnes (captain)
16	DF	NOR	Morten Konradsen
17	MF	EST	Mattias Käit
18	DF	NOR	Brede Moe

No.	Pos.	Nation	Player
19	MF	NOR	Sondre Brunstad Fet
20	FW	NOR	Erik Botheim
21	DF	NOR	Vegard Kongsro
22	MF	NOR	Vegard Leikvoll Moberg
23	MF	NOR	Elias Kristoffersen Hagen
24	FW	NOR	Lasse Selvåg Nordås
26	DF	NOR	Sigurd Kvile
27	FW	NOR	Sondre Sørli
28	FW	BRA	Pernambuco (on loan from Lviv)
30	GK	NED	Joshua Smits
31	MF	NOR	Kent Malik Swaleh
32	FW	NOR	Joel Mvuka
77	FW	GHA	Gilbert Koomson

For season transfers, see transfers winter 2020–21 and transfers summer 2021.

=== Out on loan ===
Note: Flags indicate national team as defined under FIFA eligibility rules; some limited exceptions apply. Players may hold more than one non-FIFA nationality.

No.	Pos.	Nation	Player
6	DF	NOR	Isak Amundsen (on loan at Tromsø until 31 December 2021)
15	FW	NOR	Runar Hauge (on loan at Stjørdals-Blink until 31 December 2021)
25	GK	NOR	Marcus Andersen (on loan at Fløya until 31 December 2021)
35	MF	NOR	Adan Abadala Hussein (on loan at Florø until 31 December 2021)

No.	Pos.	Nation	Player
37	MF	NOR	Ask Tjærandsen-Skau (on loan at Start until 31 December 2021)
—	FW	TUN	Sebastian Tounekti (on loan at Groningen until 31 July 2022)
—	FW	NOR	Elias Hoff Melkersen (on loan at Ranheim until 31 December 2021)
—	MF	SWE	Axel Lindahl (on loan at Degerfors until 31 December 2021)

== Pre-season and friendlies ==
19 February 2021 Friendly	Brann (Norway)	2–0	(Norway) Bodø/Glimt	Bergen
11:30	Wassberg 36'; Bamba 40'	Report	Solbakken (penalty missed) 38'	Stadium: Vestlandshallen; Attendance: 0

27 February 2021 Friendly	Marbella (Spain)	2–2	(Norway) Bodø/Glimt	Marbella, Spain
11:30	Redru 30'; Nacho 55'	Report	Junker 15'; Saltnes 60'	Stadium: Estadio Municipal de Marbella; Attendance: 0

5 March 2021 Friendly	Europa (Gibraltar)	2–5	(Norway) Bodø/Glimt	Marbella, Spain
18:00	Willy 18'; Gallardo 75'	Report	Moe 15'; Fet 31'; Botheim 73'; Vetlesen 83'; Tounekti 88'	Stadium: Estadio Municipal de Marbella; Attendance: 0

10 March 2021 Friendly	Linense (Spain)	0–2	(Norway) Bodø/Glimt	Marbella, Spain
16:30		Report	Høibråten 60', 63'	Stadium: Estadio Municipal de Marbella; Attendance: 0

24 March 2021 Friendly	Atlético Sanluqueño (Spain)	1–11	(Norway) Bodø/Glimt	Marbella, Spain
11:30	27'	Report	Lindahl 2'; Junker 16', 19', 62' (pen.); Saltnes 17'; Solbakken 43'; Fet 56'; Vetlesen 74'; Hauge 80'; Hussein 86'; Botheim 90'	Stadium: Estadio Municipal de Marbella; Attendance: 0

31 March 2021 Friendly	Linense (Spain)	0–2	(Norway) Bodø/Glimt	Marbella, Spain
11:30	(penalty missed) 17'	Report	Botheim 9', 62'	Stadium: Estadio Municipal de Marbella; Attendance: 0

18 April 2021 Friendly	Bodø/Glimt (Norway)	1–1	(Norway) Tromsø	Bodø
12:00		Report		Stadium: Aspmyra Stadion

25 April 2021 Friendly	Bodø/Glimt (Norway)	4–1	(Norway) Brann	Bodø
11:00		Report		Stadium: Aspmyra Stadion

2 May 2021 Friendly	Molde (Norway)	1–1	(Norway) Bodø/Glimt	Molde
15:30		Report		Stadium: Aker Stadion

== Competitions ==
=== Eliteserien ===
==== League table ====
Pos	Team	Pld	W	D	L	GF	GA	GD	Pts	Qualification or relegation
1	Bodø/Glimt (C)	30	18	9	3	59	25	+34	63	Qualification for the Champions League first qualifying round
2	Molde	30	18	6	6	70	40	+30	60	Qualification for the Europa Conference League second qualifying round (Note: Since the winners of the 2021 Norwegian Cup, Molde, have already qualified for European competitions based on league position, the last European spot was passed down to the fourth placed team, Lillestrøm.)
3	Viking	30	17	6	7	60	47	+13	57	Qualification for the Europa Conference League second qualifying round
4	Lillestrøm	30	14	7	9	49	40	+9	49	Qualification for the Europa Conference League second qualifying round
5	Rosenborg	30	13	9	8	58	42	+16	48	

Source: Football Association of Norway (in Norwegian)
Rules for classification: 1) Points; 2) Goal difference; 3) Goals scored; 4) Head-to-head points; 5) Head-to-head goal difference; 6) Head-to-head away goals scored (only if between two teams); 7) Head-to-head goals scored; 8) Play-off (only used to decide champions or relegation).
(C) Champions

==== Results summary ====
Overall								Home						Away					
Pld	W	D	L	GF	GA	GD	Pts	W	D	L	GF	GA	GD	W	D	L	GF	GA	GD
30	18	9	3	59	25	+34	63	10	4	1	34	13	+21	8	5	2	25	12	+13

Last updated: 12 December 2021.
Source: Eliteserien

==== Results by round ====
Round	1	2	3	4	5	6	7	8	9	10	11	12	13	14	15	16	17	18	19	20	21	22	23	24	25	26	27	28	29	30
Ground	H	A	H	A	H	A	H	A	H	A	H	H	A	H	A	H	A	H	A	H	A	H	A	A	H	A	H	A	H	A
Result	W	W	D	W	W	L	W	D	L	L	D	W	D	W	W	W	W	D	W	W	W	W	D	W	W	D	W	D	D	W
Position	1	1	2	2	1	1	1	2	3	4	6	3	4	2	2	2	1	2	1	1	1	1	1	1	1	1	1	1	1	1

Source: Eliteserien
A = Away; H = Home; W = Win; D = Draw; L = Loss

==== Matches ====
9 May 2021 1	Bodø/Glimt	3–0	Tromsø	Bodø
18:00 CEST (UTC+2)	Botheim 8'; Saltnes 13'; Moe (yellow card) 49'; Nilsen 82' (o.g.)	Summary	Gundersen (yellow card) 37'	Stadium: Aspmyra Stadion; Attendance: 600 (Due to COVID-19 restrictions); Referee: Svein Oddvar Moen

12 May 2021 2	Kristiansund	0–2	Bodø/Glimt	Kristiansund
18:00 CEST (UTC+2)	Sørmo (yellow card) 14'; Diop (yellow card) 81'	Summary	Sørli 29' (yellow card) 39'; Saltnes (yellow card) 49'; Berg (yellow card) 65'; Botheim 67'	Stadium: Kristiansund Stadion; Attendance: 600 (Due to COVID-19 restrictions); Referee: Sivert Øksnes Amland

16 May 2021 3	Bodø/Glimt	2–2	Rosenborg	Bodø
18:00 CEST (UTC+2)	Botheim 9'; Berg (yellow card) 37'; Fet 52'	Summary	Hoff (yellow card) 17'; Holse 23'; Zachariassen (yellow card) 26'; Eyjólfsson (yellow card) 81'; Wiedesheim-Paul 88'; Skjelbred (yellow card) 90+4'	Stadium: Aspmyra Stadion; Attendance: 600 (Due to COVID-19 restrictions); Referee: Kai Erik Steen

24 May 2021 4	Brann	1–2	Bodø/Glimt	Bergen
18:00 CEST (UTC+2)	Bamba 81'	Summary	Berg 67'; Botheim 87' (yellow card) 87'	Stadium: Brann Stadion; Attendance: 600 (Due to COVID-19 restrictions); Referee: Sigurd Smehus Kringstad

27 May 2021 5	Bodø/Glimt	2–0	Haugesund	Bodø
18:00 CEST (UTC+2)	Botheim 31'; Solbakken 90'	Summary	Leite (yellow card) 50'	Stadium: Aspmyra Stadion; Attendance: 600 (Due to COVID-19 restrictions); Referee: Kai Erik Steen

30 May 2021 6	Odd	1–0	Bodø/Glimt	Skien
18:00 CEST (UTC+2)	Svendsen 4'	Summary	Saltnes (yellow card) 41'; Vetlesen (yellow card) 65'; Lindahl (yellow card) 69'	Stadium: Skagerak Arena; Attendance: 0 (Due to COVID-19 restrictions); Referee: Espen Andreas Eskås

13 June 2021 7	Bodø/Glimt	2–0	Mjøndalen	Bodø
18:00 CEST (UTC+2)	Sørli 42', 70'	Summary	Aasmundsen (yellow card) 77'	Stadium: Aspmyra Stadion; Attendance: 600 (Due to COVID-19 restrictions); Referee: Tom Harald Hagen

16 June 2021 14	Bodø/Glimt	7–2	Strømsgodset	Bodø
18:00 CEST (UTC+2)	Saltnes 6', 15'; Solbakken 29'; Botheim 44'; Fet (yellow card) 60'; Vetlesen 71'; Nordås 82'; Lindahl 84'	Summary	Gunnarson (yellow card) 76'; Maigaard 79'; Valsvik 89'	Stadium: Aspmyra Stadion; Attendance: 600 (Due to COVID-19 restrictions); Referee: Sivert Øksnes Amland

20 June 2021 8	Vålerenga	1–1	Bodø/Glimt	Oslo
20:00 CEST (UTC+2)	Tollås 67'; Layouni (yellow card) 90'	Summary	Solbakken 53'; Bjørkan (yellow card) 70'	Stadium: Intility Arena; Attendance: 2 000 (Due to COVID-19 restrictions); Referee: Rohit Saggi

24 June 2021 9	Bodø/Glimt	0–2	Molde	Bodø
18:00 CEST (UTC+2)		Summary	Haugen (yellow card) 47'; Omoijuanfo 51', 78'; Ulland Andersen (yellow card) 77'	Stadium: Aspmyra Stadion; Attendance: 2 000 (Due to COVID-19 restrictions); Referee: Sivert Øksnes Amland

27 June 2021 12	Bodø/Glimt	4–1	Stabæk	Bodø
18:00 CEST (UTC+2)	Nordås 11'; Fet 14'; Saltnes 27'; Botheim 32'; Kongsro (yellow card) 67'; Berg (yellow card) 74'	Summary	Nusa 81'	Stadium: Aspmyra Stadion; Attendance: 2 000 (Due to COVID-19 restrictions); Referee: Marius Hansen Grøtta

30 June 2021 10	Sandefjord	1–0	Bodø/Glimt	Sandefjord
18:00 CEST (UTC+2)	Ruud Tveter 51'; Kreuzrieger (yellow card) 66'	Summary	Lindahl (yellow card) 83'	Stadium: Sandefjord Arena; Attendance: 2 000 (Due to COVID-19 restrictions); Referee: Espen Andreas Eskås

3 July 2021 11	Bodø/Glimt	2–2	Viking	Bodø
15:00 CEST (UTC+2)	Berg 43' (pen.), 60'	Summary	Tripić (yellow card) 38'; Vevatne (yellow card) 43'; Berisha 45', 56'; Vikstøl (yellow card) 70'	Stadium: Aspmyra Stadion; Attendance: 2 000 (Due to COVID-19 restrictions); Referee: Dag Vidar Hafsås

17 July 2021 13	Sarpsborg 08	2–2	Bodø/Glimt	Sarpsborg
20:00 CEST (UTC+2)	Salétros 26'; Karamoko (yellow card) 66'; Koné 67' (yellow card) 86'; Lindseth (yellow card) 79'; Ødegaard (yellow card) 89'	Summary	Botheim 45'; Høibråten 86'	Stadium: Sarpsborg Stadion; Attendance: 2 000 (Due to COVID-19 restrictions); Referee: Sivert Øksnes Amland

15 August 2021 15	Lillestrøm	0–1	Bodø/Glimt	Lillestrøm
18:00 CEST (UTC+2)		Summary	Lode (yellow card) 11'; Berg (penalty missed) 58'; Botheim 78'	Stadium: Åråsen Stadion; Attendance: 4 500 (Due to COVID-19 restrictions); Referee: Espen Andreas Eskås

22 August 2021 16	Bodø/Glimt	3–0	Kristiansund	Bodø
18:00 CEST (UTC+2)	Mvuka (yellow card) 51'; Pellegrino 61', 67', 78'	Summary	Coly (yellow card) 79'; Sivertsen (yellow card) 89'	Stadium: Aspmyra Stadion; Attendance: 2 000 (Due to COVID-19 restrictions); Referee: Christian Moen

29 August 2021 17	Tromsø	2–3	Bodø/Glimt	Tromsø
18:00 CEST (UTC+2)	Kitolano 49'; Amundsen 61'; Antonsen (yellow card) 63'; Gundersen (yellow card) 85'	Summary	Pellegrino 57' (yellow card) 59'; Saltnes 63', 88'; Konradsen (yellow card) 90'	Stadium: Alfheim Stadion; Attendance: 2 000 (Due to COVID-19 restrictions); Referee: Dag Vidar Hafsås

12 September 2021 18	Bodø/Glimt	1–1	Odd	Bodø
18:00 CEST (UTC+2)	Saltnes 32'	Summary	Svendsen 39'; Wallem (yellow card) 85'	Stadium: Aspmyra Stadion; Attendance: 2 700 (Due to COVID-19 restrictions); Referee: Rohit Saggi

19 September 2021 19	Viking	1–3	Bodø/Glimt	Stavanger
18:00 CEST (UTC+2)	Berisha 7'	Summary	Berg (yellow card) 34'; Sampsted (yellow card) 39'; Moe 67'; Pellegrino 76' (yellow card) 76'; Lode (yellow card) 82'; Solbakken (yellow card) 88'; Botheim 90'	Stadium: Viking Stadion; Attendance: 2 000 (Due to COVID-19 restrictions); Referee: Espen Andreas Eskås

26 September 2021 20	Bodø/Glimt	1–0	Vålerenga	Bodø
20:00 CEST (UTC+2)	Botheim 78'	Summary		Stadium: Aspmyra Stadion; Attendance: 3 724; Referee: Kristoffer Hagenes

3 October 2021 21	Stabæk	0–3	Bodø/Glimt	Bærum
18:00 CEST (UTC+2)	Kirkevold (yellow card) 29'; Høyland (yellow card) 31'; Wangberg (yellow card) 60'; Mesík (yellow card) 62'; Normann Hansen (red card) 67'	Summary	Botheim 54'; Bjørkan 62'; Fet (yellow card) 83'; Koomson 86'	Stadium: Nadderud Stadion; Attendance: 2 420; Referee: Rohit Saggi

17 October 2021 22	Bodø/Glimt	2–1	Sarpsborg 08	Bodø
17:00 CEST (UTC+2)	Botheim 13' (yellow card) 45+1'; Pellegrino (yellow card) 45+1'; Solbakken 86' (pen.)	Summary	Koné (yellow card) 76'; Lindseth 81'; Kristiansen (yellow card) 85'	Stadium: Aspmyra Stadion; Attendance: 4 417; Referee: Mohammad Usman Aslam

24 October 2021 23	Strømsgodset	1–1	Bodø/Glimt	Drammen
17:00 CEST (UTC+2)	Krasniqi 75'; Grøgaard (yellow card) 90'	Summary	Solbakken 13'; Vetlesen (yellow card) 84'	Stadium: Marienlyst Stadion; Attendance: 3 906; Referee: Ola Hobber Nilsen

27 October 2021 24	Molde	0–2	Bodø/Glimt	Molde
20:00 CEST (UTC+2)	Haugen (yellow card) 66'	Summary	Vetlesen 48'; Solbakken 57' (yellow card) 90'	Stadium: Aker Stadion; Attendance: 6 551; Referee: Espen Andreas Eskås

31 October 2021 25	Bodø/Glimt	1–0	Sandefjord	Bodø
18:00 CEST (UTC+2)	Vetlesen 63'; Hagen (yellow card) 85'	Summary	Smeulers (yellow card) 37'; Jónsson (yellow card) 55'	Stadium: Aspmyra Stadion; Attendance: 4 015; Referee: Rohit Saggi

7 November 2021 26	Haugesund	2–2	Bodø/Glimt	Haugesund
17:00 CEST (UTC+2)	Søderlund 10'; Sande 90'	Summary	Hagen (yellow card) 48'; Moe (yellow card) 60'; Lode (yellow card) 69'; Vetlesen 71', 87'	Stadium: Haugesund Stadion; Attendance: 5 166; Referee: Sivert Øksnes Amland

21 November 2021 27	Bodø/Glimt	2–0	Lillestrøm	Bodø
17:00 CEST (UTC+2)	Fet 30'; Botheim 44'; Høibråten (yellow card) 90+22'; Haikin (yellow card) 90+24'	Summary	Knudsen (yellow card) 5'; Pettersson (yellow card) 90+8'; Lehne Olsen (yellow card) 90+24'	Stadium: Aspmyra Stadion; Attendance: 4,141; Referee: Ola Hobber Nilsen

28 November 2021 28	Rosenborg	0–0	Bodø/Glimt	Trondheim
17:00 CEST (UTC+2)	Tagseth (yellow card) 39'	Summary	Berg (yellow card) 72'	Stadium: Lerkendal Stadion; Attendance: 10,910; Referee: Rohit Saggi

5 December 2021 29	Bodø/Glimt	2–2	Brann	Bodø
17:00 CEST (UTC+2)	Moe 4'; Saltnes 67'	Summary	Wassberg 79'; Finne 90+2'	Stadium: Aspmyra Stadion; Attendance: 5,038; Referee: Svein Oddvar Moen

12 December 2021 30	Mjøndalen	0–3	Bodø/Glimt	Mjøndalen
17:00 CEST (UTC+2)			Botheim 2'; Pellegrino 4'; Bjørkan 77'	Stadium: Consto Arena

=== Norwegian Cup ===
25 July 2021 First round	Rana	1–4	Bodø/Glimt	Mo i Rana
16:00 CEST (UTC+2)	Råde 27'; Hauknes (yellow card) 77'	Summary	Nordås 59', 62', 78' (pen.); Bjørnmyr 65' (o.g.)	Stadium: Nye Sagbakken Stadion; Attendance: 600; Referee: Martin Berg

1 August 2021 Second round	Junkeren	1–3	Bodø/Glimt	Bodø
18:00 CEST (UTC+2)	Chooly (yellow card) 29'; Unhjem 58' (pen.); Hansen (yellow card) 64'; Karstensen (yellow card) 86'	Summary	Hagen 3'; Høibråten (yellow card) 61'; Berg 67'; Nordås 72'	Stadium: Stordalen Kunstgressbane; Attendance: 645; Referee: Anders Bodding

22 September 2021 Third round	Alta	1–2	Bodø/Glimt	Alta
18:00 CEST (UTC+2)	Abelsen (yellow card) 32'; C. Reginiussen 87'	Summary	Vetlesen (yellow card) 24'; Kvile 45'; Sampsted 50'	Stadium: Finnmarkshallen; Attendance: 600; Referee: Christian Moen

Fourth round took place during the 2022 season.

=== UEFA Champions League ===
==== First qualifying round ====
7 July 2021 First leg	Bodø/Glimt (Norway)	2–3	(Poland) Legia Warsaw	Bodø
18:00 CEST (UTC+2)	Moe (yellow card) 25'; Botheim 45+1'; Konradsen (yellow card) 69' (yellow-red card) 82'; Pernambuco 78'	Summary	Luquinhas 2'; Emreli 41', 61'; Kapustka (yellow card) 63'; Boruc (yellow card) 70'; Mladenović (yellow card) 90'	Stadium: Aspmyra Stadion; Attendance: 2 283; Referee: Juxhin Xhaja, Albania

14 July 2021 Second leg	Legia Warsaw (Poland)	2–0 (5–2 agg.)	(Norway) Bodø/Glimt	Warsaw, Poland
20:00 CEST (UTC+2)	Luquinhas 41'; Kapustka (yellow card) 58'; Mladenović (yellow card) 81'; Pekhart 90+5'	Summary	Tounekti (yellow card) 83'	Stadium: Stadion Wojska Polskiego; Attendance: 17 473; Referee: Aristotelis Diamantopoulos, Greece

=== UEFA Europa Conference League ===
==== Second qualifying round ====
22 July 2021 First leg	Valur (Iceland)	0–3	(Norway) Bodø/Glimt	Reykjavík, Iceland
21:00 (19:00 WET)	Sævarsson (yellow card) 19'; Pedersen (yellow card) 43'	Summary	Lode (yellow card) 38'; Saltnes 40'; Berg 51' (pen.), 54'	Stadium: Hlíðarendi; Attendance: 623; Referee: Vitor Ferreira, Portugal

29 July 2021 Second leg	Bodø/Glimt (Norway)	3–0 (6–0 agg.)	(Iceland) Valur	Bodø
18:00	Saltnes (yellow card) 11' (goal) 26'; Vetlesen (yellow card) 16'; Høibråten (yellow card) 50'; Moe 61'; Hagen 90+3'	Summary	Smárason (yellow card) 29'; Hedlund (yellow card) 33'; Sigurðsson (yellow card) 34'; Hjaltested (yellow card) 59'; Køhler (yellow card) 68'	Stadium: Aspmyra Stadion; Attendance: 2 000; Referee: Paolo Valeri, Italy

==== Third qualifying round ====
5 August 2021 First leg	Prishtina (Kosovo)	2–1	(Norway) Bodø/Glimt	Pristina, Kosovo
20:00	Avdyli (yellow card) 13'; Mankenda (yellow card) 17'; Otto John 44'; Mici (yellow card) 62'; E. Krasniqi (yellow card) 75'; Lode 82' (o.g.)	Summary	Berg 11'; Vetlesen (yellow card) 57'	Stadium: Fadil Vokrri Stadium; Attendance: 2 912; Referee: Timotheos Christofi, Cyprus
Note: Prishtina assistant manager Debatik Curri was cautioned (yellow card) in the 45+2 minute.

12 August 2021 Second leg	Bodø/Glimt (Norway)	2–0 (3–2 agg.)	(Kosovo) Prishtina	Bodø
18:00	Botheim 18', 78'; Berg (penalty missed) 24'; Sampsted (yellow card) 57'	Summary	Vangjeli (yellow card) 22'; B. Krasniqi (yellow card) 71'	Stadium: Aspmyra Stadion; Attendance: 2 000; Referee: Kári Á Høvdanum, Faroe Islands

==== Play-off round ====
19 August 2021 First leg	Žalgiris (Lithuania)	2–2	(Norway) Bodø/Glimt	Vilnius, Lithuania
19:00 (20:00 EEST)	Kiš 7'; Sylvestr (yellow card) 51'; Diaw 90+2'	Summary	Fet (yellow card) 45+1'; Saltnes 49', 54'	Stadium: LFF Stadium; Attendance: 1 230; Referee: Roi Reinschreiber, Israel

26 August 2021 Second leg	Bodø/Glimt (Norway)	1–0 (3–2 agg.)	(Lithuania) Žalgiris	Bodø
18:00	Saltnes (yellow card) 54'; Solbakken 62'; Botheim (yellow card) 64'; Haikin (yellow card) 90+3'	Summary	Kiš (yellow card) 52'; Mikoliūnas (yellow card) 65'; Bopesu (yellow card) 83'	Stadium: Aspmyra Stadion; Attendance: 2 428; Referee: John Beaton, Scotland

==== Group stage ====
The draw for the group stage was held on 27 August 2021.

Pos	Team	Pld	W	D	L	GF	GA	GD	Pts	Qualification	ROM	BOD	ZOR	CSS
1	(Italy) Roma	6	4	1	1	18	11	+7	13	Advance to round of 16	—	2–2	4–0	5–1
2	(Norway) Bodø/Glimt	6	3	3	0	14	5	+9	12	Advance to knockout round play-offs	6–1	—	3–1	2–0
3	(Ukraine) Zorya Luhansk	6	2	1	3	5	11	−6	7		0–3	1–1	—	2–0
4	(Bulgaria) CSKA Sofia	6	0	1	5	3	13	−10	1		2–3	0–0	0–1	—

Source: UEFA
Rules for classification: Group stage tiebreakers

16 September 2021 1	Bodø/Glimt (Norway)	3–1	(Ukraine) Zorya Luhansk	Bodø
21:00 CEST (UTC+2)	Bjørkan (yellow card) 36'; Saltnes 48'; Solbakken 49'; Pellegrino 60'	Summary	Kocherhin (yellow card) 54'; Snuritsyn (yellow card) 59'; Hromov 90+1'	Stadium: Aspmyra Stadion; Attendance: 2 703; Referee: Dennis Higler (Netherlands)

30 September 2021 2	CSKA Sofia (Bulgaria)	0–0	(Norway) Bodø/Glimt	Sofia, Bulgaria
18:45 EEST (UTC+3)	Baï (yellow card) 29'; Turitsov (yellow card) 76'	Summary	Høibråten (yellow card) 5'; Haikin (yellow card) 90+2'	Stadium: Vasil Levski National Stadium; Attendance: 7 291; Referee: Aleksandrs Anufrijevs (Latvia)

21 October 2021 3	Bodø/Glimt (Norway)	6–1	(Italy) Roma	Bodø
18:45 CEST (UTC+2)	Botheim 8', 52'; Berg 20'; Lode (yellow card) 37'; Solbakken 71', 80'; Pellegrino 78'	Summary	Pérez 28'; Darboe (yellow card) 33'	Stadium: Aspmyra Stadion; Attendance: 5 652; Referee: Ali Palabıyık (Turkey)

4 November 2021 4	Roma (Italy)	2–2	(Norway) Bodø/Glimt	Rome, Italy
21:00 CET (UTC+1)	El Shaarawy 54'; Cristante (yellow card) 75'; Ibañez (yellow card) 78' (goal) 84'	Summary	Solbakken 45+1' (yellow card) 80'; Botheim 65'; Haikin (yellow card) 75'; Moe (yellow card) 87'	Stadium: Stadio Olimpico; Attendance: 41 031; Referee: Anastasios Papapetrou (Greece)

25 November 2021 5	Bodø/Glimt (Norway)	2–0	(Bulgaria) CSKA Sofia	Bodø
21:00 CET (UTC+1)	Fet 25'; Høibråten (yellow card) 55'; Botheim 85'	Summary	Caicedo (yellow card) 2'; Youga (yellow card) 45+1'; Mattheij (yellow card) 50'	Stadium: Aspmyra Stadion; Attendance: 5 339; Referee: Yigal Frid (Israel)

9 December 2021 6	Zorya Luhansk (Ukraine)	1–1	(Norway) Bodø/Glimt	Zaporizhzhia, Ukraine
19:45 EET (UTC+2)				Stadium: Slavutych-Arena

Knockout round play-offs took place during the 2022 season.

== Squad statistics ==
=== Appearances and goals ===
As of match played 5 December 2021

No.	Pos	Nat	Player	Total		Eliteserien		Norwegian Cup		Champions League		Europa Conference League	
No.	Pos	Nat	Player	Apps	Goals	Apps	Goals	Apps	Goals	Apps	Goals	Apps	Goals
2	DF	(Norway) NOR	Marius Lode	33	0	19+1	0	0	0	2	0	11	0
3	DF	(Iceland) ISL	Alfons Sampsted	44	1	27+1	0	2+1	1	2	0	11	0
4	DF	(Norway) NOR	Marius Høibråten	36	1	12+11	1	3	0	1+1	0	4+4	0
5	DF	(Norway) NOR	Fredrik André Bjørkan	35	1	27	1	0	0	1	0	7	0
7	MF	(Norway) NOR	Patrick Berg	39	8	25	3	2	1	2	0	10	4
9	FW	(Norway) NOR	Ola Solbakken	34	11	25	6	0	0	0	0	9	5
10	MF	(Norway) NOR	Hugo Vetlesen	41	5	9+17	5	2+1	0	2	0	7+3	0
11	FW	(Norway) NOR	Amahl Pellegrino	21	7	13+1	5	0	0	0	0	5+2	2
12	GK	(Russia) RUS	Nikita Khaykin	42	0	28	0	1	0	2	0	11	0
14	MF	(Norway) NOR	Ulrik Saltnes	33	13	21+1	8	1	0	2	0	8	5
16	MF	(Norway) NOR	Morten Konradsen	31	0	10+8	0	3	0	0+1	0	3+6	0
18	DF	(Norway) NOR	Brede Moe	35	3	22+1	2	0	0	2	0	10	1
19	MF	(Norway) NOR	Sondre Brunstad Fet	38	4	24+1	3	0+1	0	2	0	10	1
20	FW	(Norway) NOR	Erik Botheim	44	21	29	14	1+1	0	2	1	11	6
21	DF	(Norway) NOR	Vegard Kongsro	3	0	0+2	0	1	0	0	0	0	0
22	MF	(Norway) NOR	Vegard Moberg	5	0	0	0	2	0	0	0	0+3	0
23	MF	(Norway) NOR	Elias Hagen	28	2	6+11	0	3	1	0+1	0	1+6	1
24	FW	(Norway) NOR	Lasse Selvåg Nordås	20	6	4+7	2	3	4	1+1	0	0+4	0
26	DF	(Norway) NOR	Sigurd Kvile	14	1	5+5	0	2	1	0+1	0	0+1	0
27	FW	(Norway) NOR	Sondre Sørli	11	3	11	3	0	0	0	0	0	0
28	FW	(Brazil) BRA	Pernambuco	11	1	0+8	0	0	0	1+1	1	0+1	0
30	GK	(Netherlands) NED	Joshua Smits	3	0	1	0	2	0	0	0	0	0
32	FW	(Norway) NOR	Joel Mvuka	16	0	1+7	0	1	0	0	0	1+6	0
43	DF	(Norway) NOR	Brynjar Johnsplass	2	0	0	0	0+2	0	0	0	0	0
77	FW	(Ghana) GHA	Gilbert Koomson	9	1	0+6	1	1	0	0	0	0+2	0
Players away from Bodø/Glimt on loan:
11	FW	(Sweden) SWE	Axel Lindahl	15	1	0+10	1	2	0	0+1	0	0+2	0
17	FW	(Tunisia) TUN	Sebastian Tounekti	11	0	0+5	0	1+1	0	0+2	0	2	0
Players who appeared for Bodø/Glimt no longer at the club:
29	FW	(Czech Republic) CZE	Tomáš Rataj	2	0	0	0	0+2	0	0	0	0	0

=== Goalscorers ===
Rank	Pos.	No.	Nat.	Player	Eliteserien	Norwegian Cup	Champions League	Europa Conference League	Total
1	FW	20	(Norway)	Erik Botheim	14	0	1	6	21
2	MF	14	(Norway)	Ulrik Saltnes	8	0	0	5	13
3	FW	26	(Norway)	Ola Solbakken	6	0	0	5	11
4	MF	7	(Norway)	Patrick Berg	3	1	0	4	8
5	FW	11	(Norway)	Amahl Pellegrino	5	0	0	2	7
6	FW	24	(Norway)	Lasse Selvåg Nordås	2	4	0	0	6
7	MF	10	(Norway)	Hugo Vetlesen	5	0	0	0	5
8	MF	19	(Norway)	Sondre Brunstad Fet	3	0	0	1	4
9	FW	27	(Norway)	Sondre Sørli	3	0	0	0	3
9	DF	18	(Norway)	Brede Moe	2	0	0	1	3
11	MF	23	(Norway)	Elias Kristoffersen Hagen	0	1	0	1	2
11				Own goal	1	1	0	0	2
13	DF	4	(Norway)	Marius Høibråten	1	0	0	0	1
13	DF	5	(Norway)	Fredrik André Bjørkan	1	0	0	0	1
13	MF	11	(Sweden)	Axel Lindahl	1	0	0	0	1
13	FW	77	(Ghana)	Gilbert Koomson	1	0	0	0	1
13	DF	26	(Norway)	Sigurd Kvile	0	1	0	0	1
13	DF	3	(Iceland)	Alfons Sampsted	0	1	0	0	1
13	FW	28	(Brazil)	Pernambuco	0	0	1	0	1
TOTALS					56	9	2	25	92

=== Disciplinary record ===
No.	Pos.	Nat.	Name	Eliteserien		Norwegian Cup		Champions League		Europa Conference League		Total	
No.	Pos.	Nat.	Name	Booked	Sent off (straight red)	Booked	Sent off (straight red)	Booked	Sent off (straight red)	Booked	Sent off (straight red)	Booked	Sent off (straight red)
2	DF	(Norway)	Marius Lode	3	0	0	0	0	0	2	0	5	0
3	DF	(Iceland)	Alfons Sampsted	1	0	0	0	0	0	1	0	2	0
4	DF	(Norway)	Marius Høibråten	1	0	1	0	0	0	3	0	5	0
5	DF	(Norway)	Fredrik André Bjørkan	1	0	0	0	0	0	1	0	2	0
7	MF	(Norway)	Patrick Berg	5	0	0	0	0	0	0	0	5	0
9	FW	(Norway)	Ola Solbakken	2	0	0	0	0	0	1	0	3	0
10	MF	(Norway)	Hugo Vetlesen	2	0	1	0	0	0	2	0	5	0
11	FW	(Norway)	Amahl Pellegrino	3	0	0	0	0	0	0	0	3	0
12	GK	(Russia)	Nikita Khaykin	1	0	0	0	0	0	3	0	4	0
14	MF	(Norway)	Ulrik Saltnes	2	0	0	0	0	0	2	0	4	0
16	MF	(Norway)	Morten Konradsen	1	0	0	0	0	1	0	0	1	1
18	DF	(Norway)	Brede Moe	2	0	0	0	1	0	1	0	4	0
19	MF	(Norway)	Sondre Brunstad Fet	2	0	0	0	0	0	1	0	3	0
20	FW	(Norway)	Erik Botheim	2	0	0	0	0	0	1	0	3	0
21	DF	(Norway)	Vegard Kongsro	1	0	0	0	0	0	0	0	1	0
23	MF	(Norway)	Elias Kristoffersen Hagen	2	0	0	0	0	0	0	0	2	0
27	FW	(Norway)	Sondre Sørli	1	0	0	0	0	0	0	0	1	0
31	FW	(Norway)	Joel Mvuka	1	0	0	0	0	0	0	0	1	0
Players away on loan from Bodø/Glimt:
11	MF	(Sweden)	Axel Lindahl	2	0	0	0	0	0	0	0	2	0
17	FW	(Tunisia)	Sebastian Tounekti	0	0	0	0	1	0	0	0	1	0
TOTALS				35	0	2	0	2	1	19	0	58	1
