= 2022 FK Bodø/Glimt season =

Bodø/Glimt
- Chairman: Inge Henning Andersen
- Manager: Kjetil Knutsen
- Stadium: Aspmyra Stadion
- Eliteserien: 2nd
- 2021 Norwegian Cup: Runners-up
- 2022 Norwegian Cup: Fourth round
- 2021–22 Europa Conference League: Quarter-finals
- 2022–23 Champions League: Play-off round
- 2022–23 Europa League: Group stage
- 2022–23 Europa Conference League: Knockout round play-offs
- Top goalscorer: League: Amahl Pellegrino (19); All: Amahl Pellegrino (23)
- Biggest win: 8–0 against Linfield
Home colours	Away colours

The 2022 FK Bodø/Glimt season is the club's 106th season in its existence and the fifth consecutive season in the Eliteserien. In addition to the domestic season, Bodø/Glimt are participating in the Norwegian Cup and the UEFA Europa League.

== Players ==
=== Squad ===
As of 17 July 2022

Note: Flags indicate national team as defined under FIFA eligibility rules; some limited exceptions apply. Players may hold more than one non-FIFA nationality.

No.	Pos.	Nation	Player
1	GK	NOR	Julian Faye Lund
2	DF	DEN	Japhet Sery Larsen
3	DF	ISL	Alfons Sampsted
4	DF	NOR	Marius Høibråten
5	DF	NOR	Brice Wembangomo
6	DF	NOR	Isak Amundsen
7	FW	NOR	Amahl Pellegrino
8	MF	DEN	Albert Grønbæk
9	FW	NOR	Ola Solbakken
10	MF	NOR	Hugo Vetlesen
11	FW	NOR	Runar Espejord
12	GK	RUS	Nikita Khaykin
14	MF	NOR	Ulrik Saltnes (captain)
15	MF	NOR	Anders Konradsen
16	MF	NOR	Morten Konradsen
17	MF	NOR	Gaute Høberg Vetti

No.	Pos.	Nation	Player
18	DF	NOR	Brede Moe
19	MF	NOR	Sondre Brunstad Fet
20	MF	NOR	Fredrik Sjøvold
21	DF	CZE	Lucas Kubr
23	MF	NOR	Elias Kristoffersen Hagen
25	GK	NOR	Marcus Andersen
26	DF	NOR	Sigurd Kvile
27	FW	NOR	Sondre Sørli
29	MF	SLO	Nino Žugelj
32	FW	NOR	Joel Mvuka
35	MF	NOR	Adan Abadala Hussein
37	MF	NOR	Ask Tjærandsen-Skau
43	DF	NOR	Brynjar Johnsplass
77	MF	GHA	Gilbert Koomson
88	FW	NOR	Lars-Jørgen Salvesen
—	FW	TUN	Sebastian Tounekti

=== Out on loan ===
Note: Flags indicate national team as defined under FIFA eligibility rules; some limited exceptions apply. Players may hold more than one non-FIFA nationality.

No.	Pos.	Nation	Player
24	FW	NOR	Lasse Selvåg Nordås (at Tromsø until 31 December 2022)

== Pre-season and friendlies ==
Win Draw Loss Fixtures

== Competitions ==
=== Overall record ===
Competition	First match	Last match	Starting round	Final position	Record							
Competition	First match	Last match	Starting round	Final position	Pld	W	D	L	GF	GA	GD	Win %
Eliteserien	3 April 2022	13 November 2022	Matchday 1	Runners-up	30	18	6	6	86	41	+45	60.00
2021 Norwegian Cup	20 March 2022	1 May 2022	Fourth round	Runners-up	3	2	0	1	6	3	+3	66.67
2022 Norwegian Cup	19 May 2022	29 June 2022	First round	Third round	3	3	0	0	10	0	+10	100.00
2021–22 Europa Conference League	16 February 2023	23 February 2023	Knockout round play-offs	Quarter-finals	5	3	1	1	11	9	+2	60.00
UEFA Champions League	6 July 2022	24 August 2022	First qualifying round	Play-off round	13	5	2	6	23	18	+5	38.46
UEFA Europa League	8 September 2022	3 November 2022	Group stage	Group stage	6	1	1	4	5	10	−5	16.67
Total					60	32	10	18	141	81	+60	53.33

Last updated: 13 November 2022
Source: Soccerway

=== Eliteserien ===
==== League table ====
Pos	Team	Pld	W	D	L	GF	GA	GD	Pts	Qualification or relegation
1	Molde (C)	30	25	3	2	71	25	+46	78	Qualification for the Champions League second qualifying round
2	Bodø/Glimt	30	18	6	6	86	41	+45	60	Qualification for the Europa Conference League second qualifying round
3	Rosenborg	30	16	8	6	69	44	+25	56	Qualification for the Europa Conference League second qualifying round
4	Lillestrøm	30	16	5	9	49	34	+15	53	
5	Odd	30	13	6	11	43	45	−2	45	

Source: Football Association of Norway (in Norwegian)
Rules for classification: 1) Points; 2) Goal difference; 3) Goals scored; 4) Head-to-head points; 5) Head-to-head goal difference; 6) Head-to-head goals scored.
(C) Champions

==== Results summary ====
Overall								Home						Away					
Pld	W	D	L	GF	GA	GD	Pts	W	D	L	GF	GA	GD	W	D	L	GF	GA	GD
30	18	6	6	86	41	+45	60	8	6	1	47	20	+27	10	0	5	39	21	+18

Last updated: 13 November 2022.
Source: Eliteserien

==== Results by round ====
Round	1	2	3	4	5	6	7	8	9	10	11	12	13	14	15	16	17	18	19	20	21	22	23	24	25	26	27	28	29	30
Ground	H	A	H	A	H	H	A	H	A	A	H	A	H	A	H	A	H	A	H	A	H	A	H	A	H	A	H	A	H	A
Result	D	W	W	L	D	D	W	D	L	W	W	L	W	W	W	W	W	W	D	W	L	L	D	W	W	W	W	L	W	W
Position	7	4	1	3	5	7	5	6	8	6	5	6	4	4	3	3	3	2	3	2	3	4	4	2	2	2	2	2	2	2

Source: Eliteserien
A = Away; H = Home; W = Win; D = Draw; L = Loss

==== Matches ====
3 April 2022 1	Bodø/Glimt	2–2	Rosenborg	Bodø
20:00 CEST (UTC+2)	Pellegrino 63' (pen.); Espejord 70'	Report	Børkeeiet 16', 75'; Holm (yellow card) 24'; Jensen (yellow card) 42'; Tagseth (yellow card) 55'; Reitan (yellow card) 62'	Stadium: Aspmyra Stadion; Attendance: 6,465; Referee: Espen Eskås

10 April 2022 2	Sandefjord	1–2	Bodø/Glimt	Sandefjord
18:00 CEST (UTC+2)	Vega 67' (yellow card) 68'; Singh (yellow card) 90'	Report	Boniface 13'; Saltnes 76'	Stadium: Release Arena; Attendance: 4,306; Referee: Kai Steen

18 April 2022 3	Bodø/Glimt	5–1	Vålerenga	Bodø
20:00 CEST (UTC+2)	Solbakken 36'; Saltnes 40'; Høibråten (yellow card) 61'; Espejord 62'; Vetlesen 71', 78' (yellow card) 73'	Report	Bjørdal 86' (pen.)	Stadium: Aspmyra Stadion; Attendance: 4,934; Referee: Rohit Saggi

24 April 2022 4	Viking	2–0	Bodø/Glimt	Stavanger
18:00 CEST (UTC+2)	Tripić 26'; Brekalo (yellow card) 65'; Sebulonsen 67'; Sandberg (yellow card) 80'; Friðjónsson (yellow card) 90'	Report	Boniface (yellow card) 59' (yellow-red card) 74'	Stadium: SR-Bank Arena; Attendance: 15,304; Referee: Tore Hansen

8 May 2022 5	Bodø/Glimt	1–1	Lillestrøm	Bodø
18:00 CEST (UTC+2)	Vetlesen (yellow card) 71'; Sampsted 82'; Høibråten (yellow card) 90+5'	Report	Adams 32'; Mathew (yellow card) 56'; Pettersson (yellow card) 73'; Knudsen (yellow card) 85'	Stadium: Aspmyra Stadion; Attendance: 5,060; Referee: Espen Eskås

16 May 2022 6	Bodø/Glimt	1–1	Tromsø	Bodø
18:00 CEST (UTC+2)	Koomson (yellow card) 37'; Sørli (yellow card) 70'; Mvuka 90+3'	Report	Jenssen (yellow card) 28'; Vesterlund 53'; Gundersen (yellow card) 71'	Stadium: Aspmyra Stadion; Attendance: 7,813; Referee: Kristoffer Hagenes

22 May 2022 7	Haugesund	1–4	Bodø/Glimt	Haugesund
18:00 CEST (UTC+2)	Sande 47'	Report	Sørli 8'; Espejord 31'; Pellegrino 32', 66'; Sampsted (yellow card) 90+1'	Stadium: Haugesund Sparebank Arena; Attendance: 4,514; Referee: Svein Tore Sinnes

25 May 2022 8	Bodø/Glimt	2–2	Strømsgodset	Bodø
18:00 CEST (UTC+2)	Pellegrino 4'; Moe 29'; Hagen (yellow card) 56'	Report	Hove 36'; Friday 82'	Stadium: Aspmyra Stadion; Attendance: 4,809; Referee: Svein Oddvar Moen

29 May 2022 9	Molde	3–1	Bodø/Glimt	Molde
18:00 CEST (UTC+2)	Grødem 4'; Mannsverk (yellow card) 39'; Risa (yellow card) 47'; Fofana 60'; Eikrem (yellow card) 64'; Høibråten 77' (o.g.)	Report	Mvuka 66'	Stadium: Aker Stadion; Attendance: 6,156; Referee: Espen Eskås

18 June 2022 10	Kristiansund	0–2	Bodø/Glimt	Kristiansund
18:00 CEST (UTC+2)	Kartum (yellow card) 44'; Aasbak (yellow card) 87'	Report	Pellegrino 53', 72'; Saltnes (yellow card) 55'	Stadium: Kristiansund Stadion; Attendance: 3,700; Referee: Daniel Higraff

26 June 2022 11	Bodø/Glimt	2–0	Aalesund	Bodø
18:00 CEST (UTC+2)	Wembangomo (yellow card) 45+1' (goal) 89'; Solbakken (yellow card) 55'; Pellegrino 76'	Report	Čanađija (yellow card) 42'; Kallevåg (yellow card) 55'	Stadium: Aspmyra Stadion; Attendance: 5,126; Referee: Marius Lien

2 July 2022 12	Odd	3–2	Bodø/Glimt	Skien
18:00 CEST (UTC+2)	Jevtović 19' (yellow card) 78'; Jørgensen (yellow card) 52'; Wallem 59'; Stensrud (yellow card) 75'; Bjørtuft (red card) 84'; Ruud 90+9' (pen.)	Report	Pellegrino 29'; Høibråten (yellow card) 54'; Sery Larsen (yellow card) 72'; Amundsen 90+7'	Stadium: Skagerak Arena; Attendance: 3,748; Referee: Rohit Saggi

9 July 2022 13	Bodø/Glimt	4–1	Sarpsborg 08	Bodø
16:00 CEST (UTC+2)	Vetlesen 21' (yellow card) 29'; Saltnes 44'; Boniface 63', 90+1' (pen.)	Report	Skålevik 1'; Soltvedt (yellow card) 24'; Maigaard (yellow card) 29'; Halvorsen (yellow card) 90+4'	Stadium: Aspmyra Stadion; Attendance: 5,064; Referee: Tom Harald Hagen

16 July 2022 14	HamKam	0–2	Bodø/Glimt	Hamar
18:00 CEST (UTC+2)	Melgalvis (yellow card) 32'; Eriksen (yellow card) 80'	Report	Pellegrino 77', 82'	Stadium: Briskeby Stadion; Attendance: 5,316; Referee: Daniel Higraff

23 July 2022 15	Bodø/Glimt	5–0	Jerv	Bodø
16:00 CEST (UTC+2)	Boniface 13'; Pellegrino 39', 45+2' (pen.), 48'; Saltnes 42'; Haikin (yellow card) 83'	Report	Furtado (yellow card) 29'; Norheim (yellow card) 52'	Stadium: Aspmyra Stadion; Attendance: 4,886; Referee: Sivert Amland

30 July 2022 16	Aalesund	1–2	Bodø/Glimt	Ålesund
16:00 CEST (UTC+2)	Ødemarksbakken 32'; Čanađija (yellow card) 49'; Golubović (yellow card) 76'; Šerbečić (yellow card) 86'	Report	Boniface 26', 42'; Wembangomo (yellow card) 75'; Hagen (yellow card) 90+4'	Stadium: Color Line Stadion; Attendance: 4,725; Referee: Kai Erik Steen

6 August 2022 17	Bodø/Glimt	7–0	Odd	Bodø
16:00 CEST (UTC+2)	Pellegrino 12', 44'; Vetlesen 26', 45+1', 53'; Espejord 67'; Saltnes 78'	Report		Stadium: Aspmyra Stadion; Attendance: 5,211; Referee: Ola Hobber Nilsen

12 August 2022 18	Sarpsborg 08	1–4	Bodø/Glimt	Sarpsborg
19:00 CEST (UTC+2)	Wichne (yellow card) 70'; Heintz (yellow card) 73' (goal) 77'; Ødegård (yellow card) 90'	Report	Vetlesen 39'; Pellegrino 45', 85'; Salvesen 65'	Stadium: Sarpsborg Stadion; Attendance: 4,898; Referee: Espen Eskås

20 August 2022 19	Bodø/Glimt	2–2	HamKam	Bodø
18:00 CEST (UTC+2)	Pellegrino 40', 72' (pen.)	Report	Kurucay 54'; Bjørlo (yellow card) 64'; Hernandez-Foster (yellow card) 74'; Kirkevold 86'	Stadium: Aspmyra Stadion; Attendance: 6,303; Referee: Marius Hansen Grøtta

27 August 2022 20	Jerv	0–2	Bodø/Glimt	Grimstad
18:00 CEST (UTC+2)	Brenden (yellow card) 44'; Wichne (yellow card) 70'	Report	Espejord 9'; Grønbæk (yellow card) 65'; Vetlesen 66'	Stadium: Levermyr Stadion; Attendance: 2,619; Referee: Ola Hobber Nilsen

3 September 2022 21	Bodø/Glimt	1–4	Molde	Bodø
18:00 CEST (UTC+2)	Amundsen 45+1'; Mvuka (yellow card) 55'	Report	Breivik (yellow card) 14' (goal) 45+2'; Mannsverk (yellow card) 30'; Kaasa 37', 67'; Haugen (yellow card) 70'; Brynhildsen 83'	Stadium: Aspmyra Stadion; Attendance: 7,830; Referee: Espen Eskås

11 September 2022 22	Tromsø	3–2	Bodø/Glimt	Tromsø
18:00 CEST (UTC+2)	Nordås 13' (yellow card) 60'; Yttergård Jenssen (yellow card) 27'; Mikkelsen 38'; Nilsen (yellow card) 45'; Kitolano 55'	Report	Haikin (yellow card) 45'; Lode (yellow card) 77'; Žugelj 85'; Salvesen 89'	Stadium: Alfheim Stadion; Attendance: 6,691; Referee: Tom Harald Hagen

18 September 2022 23	Bodø/Glimt	1–1	Haugesund	Bodø
18:00 CEST (UTC+2)	Espejord 48'; Solbakken (yellow card) 90+4'	Report	Reese (yellow card) 8'; Zafeiris (yellow card) 41'; Eskesen 58'	Stadium: Aspmyra Stadion; Attendance: 6,348; Referee: Svein Tore Sinnes

2 October 2022 24	Lillestrøm	1–4	Bodø/Glimt	Lillestrøm
18:00 CEST (UTC+2)	Ibrahimaj 32'; Dragsnes (yellow card) 82'	Report	Saltnes 29'; Espejord 52'; Mvuka (yellow card) 82'; Salvesen (yellow card) 85'; Vetlesen 87'; Pellegrino 90' (yellow card) 90'; Žugelj (yellow card) 90+3'	Stadium: Åråsen Stadion; Attendance: 7,258; Referee: Tore Hansen

9 October 2022 25	Bodø/Glimt	4–1	Sandefjord	Bodø
17:00 CEST (UTC+2)	Grønbæk (yellow card) 38'; Vetlsen 54', 82'; Wembangomo 58'; Pellegrino 74'	Report	Ordagić (yellow card) 42'; Jansen 45+1'; Rufo (yellow card) 62'; Kurtovic (yellow card) 69'	Stadium: Aspmyra Stadion; Attendance: 6,002; Referee: Sivert Amland

16 October 2022 26	Vålerenga	0–6	Bodø/Glimt	Oslo
17:00 CEST (UTC+2)	Sjøeng (red card) 14'; Layouni (yellow card) 78'	Report	Espejord 18'; Pellegrino 32', 39'; Høibråten (yellow card) 36'; Solbakken 60'; Berg 64'; Grønbæk 79'	Stadium: Intility Arena; Attendance: 10,366; Referee: Rohit Saggi

23 October 2022 27	Bodø/Glimt	5–0	Kristiansund	Bodø
17:00 CEST (UTC+2)	Vetlesen 44', 45+1'; Solbakken 53', 58'; Espejord 68'	Report	Kvile (yellow card) 27'; Diop (yellow card) 27'; Gjertsen (yellow card) 43'	Stadium: Aspmyra Stadion; Attendance: 6,199; Referee: Kai Erik Steen

30 October 2022 28	Rosenborg	3–2	Bodø/Glimt	Trondheim
17:00 CET (UTC+1)	Holse 73', 88' (yellow card) 78'; Tengstedt 77'	Report	Espejord 18'; Vetlesen 76'	Stadium: Lerkendal Stadion; Attendance: 21,275; Referee: Kristoffer Hagenes

6 November 2022 29	Bodø/Glimt	5–4	Viking	Bodø
17:00 CET (UTC+1)	Pellegrino 5'; Vetlesen 23', 84' (yellow card) 54'; Espejord 70'; Grønbæk 80'	Report	Karlsbakk 13'; Løkberg 34' (yellow card) 62'; Kabran (yellow card) 41' (goal) 55', 67'	Stadium: Aspmyra Stadion; Attendance: 6,879; Referee: Ola Hobber Nilsen

13 November 2022 30	Strømsgodset	2–4	Bodø/Glimt	Drammen
17:00 CET (UTC+1)	Gunnarsson 16'; Therkelsen (yellow card) 37'; Braut Brunes 56'	Report	Solbakken (yellow card) 34'; Valsvik 42' (o.g.); Espejord 47'; Høibråten 75'; Pellegrino 87'	Stadium: Marienlyst Stadion; Attendance: 5,887; Referee: Svein Oddvar Moen

=== Norwegian Football Cup ===
==== 2021 ====
6 March 2022 Fourth round	Aalesund	w/o	Bodø/Glimt	Ålesund
18:00 CEST (UTC+2)		Report		Stadium: Color Line Stadion; Referee: Svein Oddvar Moen

20 March 2022 Quarter-finals	Bodø/Glimt	4–1	Lillestrøm	Bodø
20:00 CET (UTC+1)	Espejord 37'; Hagen 53'; Pellegrino 87'; Boniface 90+2'	Report	Dragsnes 13'; Mathew (yellow card) 60'; Fridjonsson (yellow card) 67'	Stadium: Aspmyra Stadion; Attendance: 3,181; Referee: Kristoffer Hagenes

21 April 2022 Semi-finals	Bodø/Glimt	2–1	Viking	Bodø
20:10 CEST (UTC+2)	Espejord 17'; Koomson 38'; Vetlesen (yellow card) 44'; Wembangomo (yellow card) 55'; Hagen (yellow card) 56'; Solbakken (yellow card) 56'	Report	Berisha 12' (pen.); Stensness (yellow card) 56'	Stadium: Aspmyra Stadion; Attendance: 5,123; Referee: Ola Hobber Nilsen

1 May 2022 Final	Bodø/Glimt	0–1	Molde	Oslo
16:00 CEST (UTC+2)	Khaykin (yellow card) 74'	Report	Breivik (yellow card) 45'; Hansen (yellow card) 67'; Mannsverk 76' (pen.)	Stadium: Ullevaal Stadion; Attendance: 19,657; Referee: Rohit Saggi

==== 2022 ====
19 May 2022 First round	Rana	0–4	Bodø/Glimt	Mo i Rana
18:00 CEST (UTC+2)	Henriksen (yellow card) 26'	Report	Boniface 14', 79'; Saltnes 29'; Mugisha 73'	Stadium: Sagbakken KGB; Attendance: 1,600; Referee: Martin Berg

22 June 2022 Second round	Harstad	0–5	Bodø/Glimt	Harstad
18:00 CEST (UTC+2)	Fjellvang (yellow card) 54'	Report	Hagen 16', 45'; Koomson 25'; Amundsen 42', 62'	Stadium: Harstad Stadion; Referee: Kristian Kristiansen

29 June 2022 Third round	Vålerenga	0–1	Bodø/Glimt	Oslo
20:15 CEST (UTC+2)		Report	Solbakken (penalty missed) 84'; Saltnes 90'; Boniface (yellow card) 90+3'	Stadium: Intility Arena; Attendance: 3,097; Referee: Sivert Amland

Fourth round took place during the 2023 season.

=== UEFA Europa Conference League ===
==== Knockout phase ====
===== Knockout round play-offs =====
The draw for the knockout round play-offs was held on 13 December 2021.

17 February 2022 First leg	Celtic (Scotland)	1–3	(Norway) Bodø/Glimt	Glasgow, Scotland
20:00 GMT (UTC±0)	Maeda 79'	Report	Espejord 7'; Pellegrino (yellow card) 43' (goal) 55'; Vetlesen 81'; Haikin (yellow card) 89'	Stadium: Celtic Park; Attendance: 54,926; Referee: Andris Treimanis (Latvia)

24 February 2022 Second leg	Bodø/Glimt (Norway)	2–0 (5–1 agg.)	(Scotland) Celtic	Bodø
18:45 CET (UTC+1)	Solbakken 9'; Sampsted (yellow card) 39'; Wembangomo (yellow card) 59'; Vetlesen 69'	Report	McGregor (yellow card) 60'; Scales (yellow card) 64'	Stadium: Aspmyra Stadion; Attendance: 5,801; Referee: Sergey Ivanov (Russia)

===== Round of 16 =====
The draw for the round of 16 was held on 25 February 2022.

10 March 2022 First leg	Bodø/Glimt (Norway)	2–1	(Netherlands) AZ	Bodø
21:00 CET (UTC+1)	Pellegrino 39'; Wembangomo (yellow card) 51'; Solbakken 90+1' (pen.)	Report	Witry (yellow card) 45'; Aboukhlal 73' (yellow card) 77'; Evjen (yellow card) 75'	Stadium: Aspmyra Stadion; Attendance: 5,724; Referee: Nikola Dabanović (Montenegro)

17 March 2022 Second leg	AZ (Netherlands)	2–2 (a.e.t.) (3–4 agg.)	(Norway) Bodø/Glimt	Alkmaar, Netherlands
18:45 CET (UTC+1)	Pavlidis 18', 30'; Reijnders (yellow card) 44'; de Wit (yellow card) 46'; Sugawara (yellow card) 86'; Sowah (yellow card) 90'	Report	Sampsted (yellow card) 6' (goal) 105+1'; Pellegrino 26'; Saltnes (yellow card) 90'; Solbakken (yellow card) 113'; Haikin (yellow card) 116'	Stadium: AFAS Stadion; Attendance: 15,024; Referee: Ivan Kružliak (Slovakia)

===== Quarter-finals =====
The draw for the quarter-finals was held on 18 March 2022.

7 April 2022 First leg	Bodø/Glimt (Norway)	2–1	(Italy) Roma	Bodø
21:00 CEST (UTC+2)	Saltnes 56'; Vetlesen 89'	Report	Cristante (yellow card) 18'; Pellegrini 43'; Viña (yellow card) 88'	Stadium: Aspmyra Stadion; Attendance: 7,739; Referee: Serdar Gözübüyük (Netherlands)

14 April 2022 Second leg	Roma (Italy)	4–0 (5–2 agg.)	(Norway) Bodø/Glimt	Rome, Italy
21:00 CEST (UTC+2)	Abraham 5'; Zaniolo 23', 29', 49'; Mancini (yellow card) 54'	Report		Stadium: Stadio Olimpico; Attendance: 61,942; Referee: José María Sánchez Martínez (Spain)

=== UEFA Champions League ===
==== First qualifying round ====
The draw for the first qualifying round was held on 14 June 2022.

6 July 2022 First leg	Bodø/Glimt (Norway)	3–0	(Faroe Islands) KÍ Klaksvík	Bodø
18:00 CEST (UTC+2)	Boniface 11', 31', 58' (pen.)	Report	Mikkelsen (yellow card) 71'	Stadium: Aspmyra Stadion; Attendance: 4,227; Referee: Mohammed Al-Hakim (Sweden)

13 July 2022 (Note: The KÍ Klaksvík v Bodø/Glimt match, originally scheduled for 12 July 2022, 20:00 (19:00 WEST), was rescheduled to the following day, 19:00 (18:00 WEST), as Bodo/Glimt's flight to the Faroe Islands arrived late due to bad weather conditions.) Second leg	KÍ Klaksvík (Faroe Islands)	3–1 (3–4 agg.)	(Norway) Bodø/Glimt	Klaksvík, Faroe Islands
18:00 WEST (UTC+1)	Mikkelsen 12'; J. Andreasen 20', 85'; Vatnsdal (yellow card) 72'	Report	Boniface 55' (pen.)	Stadium: Við Djúpumýrar; Attendance: 883; Referee: Horațiu Feșnic (Romania)

==== Second qualifying round ====
The draw for the second qualifying round was held on 15 June 2022.

19 July 2022 First leg	Linfield (Northern Ireland)	1–0	(Norway) Bodø/Glimt	Belfast, Northern Ireland
19:45 BST (UTC+1)	Hall (yellow card) 22'; Millar 83'	Report	Høibråten (yellow card) 16'; Wembangomo (yellow card) 72'; Hagen (yellow card) 78'	Stadium: Windsor Park; Attendance: 3,168; Referee: Andris Treimanis (Latvia)

27 July 2022 Second leg	Bodø/Glimt (Norway)	8–0 (8–1 agg.)	(Northern Ireland) Linfield	Bodø
18:00 CEST (UTC+2)	Vetlesen 7'; Boniface 21' (pen.); Pellegrino 25', 54' (pen.); Saltnes 29'; Espejord 52', 88'; Sampsted 73'	Report	Millar (red card) 21'; Mulgrew (yellow card) 55'; McClean (yellow card) 65'	Stadium: Aspmyra Stadion; Attendance: 5,110; Referee: Roi Reinshreiber (Israel)

==== Third qualifying round ====
The draw for the third qualifying round was held on 18 July 2022.

3 August 2022 First leg	Bodø/Glimt (Norway)	5–0	(Lithuania) Žalgiris	Bodø
18:00 CEST (UTC+2)	Vetlesen 33' (pen.); Pellegrino 36'; Wembangomo (yellow card) 52'; Salvesen 58'; Høibråten 61'; Espejord 90+3'	Report	Bopesu (yellow card) 32'; Ourega (yellow card) 41'; Mamić (yellow card) 80'	Stadium: Aspmyra Stadion; Attendance: 6,117; Referee: István Vad (Hungary)

9 August 2022 Second leg	Žalgiris (Lithuania)	1–1 (1–6 agg.)	(Norway) Bodø/Glimt	Vilnius, Lithuania
19:00 EEST (UTC+3)	Kyeremeh (yellow card) 9' (goal) 39'; Gorobsov (yellow card) 26'; Mamić (red card) 55'; Oliveira (yellow card) 61'; Bopesu (yellow card) 77'	Report	Mvuka 51'	Stadium: LFF Stadium; Attendance: 4,629; Referee: Sandro Schärer (Switzerland)

==== Play-off round ====
The draw for the play-off round was held on 2 August 2022.

16 August 2022 First leg	Bodø/Glimt (Norway)	1–0	(Croatia) Dinamo Zagreb	Bodø
21:00 CEST (UTC+2)	Pellegrino 37'	Report	Mišić (yellow card) 52'; Dilaver (yellow card) 87'	Stadium: Aspmyra Stadion; Attendance: 7,762; Referee: Danny Makkelie (Netherlands)

24 August 2022 Second leg	Dinamo Zagreb (Croatia)	4–1 (a.e.t.) (4–2 agg.)	(Norway) Bodø/Glimt	Zagreb, Croatia
21:00 CEST (UTC+2)	Oršić 4'; Petković 35'; Gojak (yellow card) 92'; Moharrami (yellow card) 109'; Drmić 117'; Bočkaj 120'	Report	Wembangomo (yellow card) 59'; Grønbæk 70'; Mvuka (yellow card) 90+2'	Stadium: Stadion Maksimir; Attendance: 18,349; Referee: Antonio Mateu Lahoz (Spain)

=== UEFA Europa League ===
==== Group stage ====
The draw for the group stage was held on 26 August 2022.

Pos	Team	Pld	W	D	L	GF	GA	GD	Pts	Qualification	ARS	PSV	BOD	ZUR
1	(England) Arsenal	6	5	0	1	8	3	+5	15	Advance to round of 16	—	1–0	3–0	1–0
2	(Netherlands) PSV Eindhoven	6	4	1	1	15	4	+11	13	Advance to knockout round play-offs	2–0	—	1–1	5–0
3	(Norway) Bodø/Glimt	6	1	1	4	5	10	−5	4	Transfer to Europa Conference League	0–1	1–2	—	2–1
4	(Switzerland) Zürich	6	1	0	5	5	16	−11	3		1–2	1–5	2–1	—

Source: UEFA
Rules for classification: Group stage tiebreakers

8 September 2022 1	PSV Eindhoven (Netherlands)	1–1	(Norway) Bodø/Glimt	Eindhoven, Netherlands
18:45 CEST (UTC+2)	Gakpo (yellow card) 56' (goal) 62'; Simons (yellow card) 90+4'	Report	Grønbæk 44'; Berg (yellow card) 48'; Amundsen (yellow card) 74'; Haikin (yellow card) 90+1'	Stadium: Philips Stadion; Attendance: 28,627; Referee: Georgi Kabakov (Bulgaria)

15 September 2022 2	Bodø/Glimt (Norway)	2–1	(Switzerland) Zürich	Bodø
21:00 CEST (UTC+2)	Lode (yellow card) 17'; Selnæs 54' (o.g.); Vetlesen 58'	Report	Selnæs (yellow card) 51'; Tosin (yellow card) 60'; Avdijaj 81'	Stadium: Aspmyra Stadion; Attendance: 8,000; Referee: Stéphanie Frappart (France)

6 October 2022 3	Arsenal (England)	3–0	(Norway) Bodø/Glimt	London, England
20:00 BST (UTC+1)	Nketiah 23'; Holding 27'; Xhaka (yellow card) 41'; Fábio Vieira 84'	Report	Wembangomo (yellow card) 33'; Sampsted (yellow card) 53'	Stadium: Emirates Stadium; Attendance: 59,724; Referee: Harm Osmers (Germany)

13 October 2022 4	Bodø/Glimt (Norway)	0–1	(England) Arsenal	Bodø
18:45 CEST (UTC+2)	Vetlesen (yellow card) 66'	Report	Saka 24', (yellow card) 30'; Partey (yellow card) 89'; Turner (yellow card) 90+2'	Stadium: Aspmyra Stadion; Attendance: 7,922; Referee: Irfan Peljto (Bosnia and Herzegovina)

27 October 2022 5	Zürich (Switzerland)	2–1	(Norway) Bodø/Glimt	Zürich, Switzerland
18:45 CEST (UTC+2)	Boranijašević 67'; Marchesano 90+7'	Report	Pellegrino 45+1'	Stadium: Letzigrund; Attendance: 10,168; Referee: Yevhen Aranovskyi (Ukraine)

3 November 2022 6	Bodø/Glimt (Norway)	1–2	(Netherlands) PSV Eindhoven	Bodø
21:00 CET	Vetlesen (yellow card) 32'; Larsen (yellow card) 49'; Žugelj 90+3'	Report	Sampsted 36' (o.g.); Bakayoko 52'; Ramalho (yellow card) 59'	Stadium: Aspmyra Stadion; Attendance: 7,985; Referee: Donatas Rumšas (Lithuania)
