= 2021–22 UEFA Europa Conference League knockout phase =

The 2021–22 UEFA Europa Conference League knockout phase began on 17 February with the knockout round play-offs and ended on 25 May 2022 with the final at the Arena Kombëtare in Tirana, Albania, to decide the champions of the 2021–22 UEFA Europa Conference League. A total of 24 teams competed in the knockout phase.

Times are CET/CEST, (Note: CET (UTC+1) for dates up to 26 March 2021 (round of 16), and CEST (UTC+2) for dates thereafter (quarter-finals, semi-finals and final).) as listed by UEFA (local times, if different, are in parentheses).

== Qualified teams ==
The knockout phase involved 24 teams: the 16 teams which qualified as winners and runners-up of each of the eight groups in the group stage, and the eight third-placed teams from the Europa League group stage.

=== Europa Conference League group stage winners and runners-up ===
Group	Winners (advance to round of 16 and seeded in draw)	Runners-up (advance to KO play-offs and seeded in draw)
A	(Austria) LASK	(Israel) Maccabi Tel Aviv
B	(Belgium) Gent	(Serbia) Partizan
C	(Italy) Roma	(Norway) Bodø/Glimt
D	(Netherlands) AZ	(Denmark) Randers
E	(Netherlands) Feyenoord	(Czech Republic) Slavia Prague
F	(Denmark) Copenhagen	(Greece) PAOK
G	(France) Rennes	(Netherlands) Vitesse
H	(Switzerland) Basel	(Azerbaijan) Qarabağ

=== Europa League group stage third-placed teams ===
Group	Third-placed teams (advance to KO play-offs and unseeded in draw)
A	(Czech Republic) Sparta Prague
B	(Netherlands) PSV Eindhoven
C	(England) Leicester City
D	(Turkey) Fenerbahçe
E	(France) Marseille
F	(Denmark) Midtjylland
G	(Scotland) Celtic
H	(Austria) Rapid Wien

== Format ==
Each tie in the knockout phase, apart from the final, was played over two legs, with each team playing one leg at home. The team that scored more goals on aggregate over the two legs advanced to the next round. If the aggregate score was level, then 30 minutes of extra time were played (the away goals rule was not applied). If the score was still level at the end of extra time, the winners were decided by a penalty shoot-out. In the final, which was played as a single match, if the score was level at the end of normal time, extra time was played, followed by a penalty shoot-out if the score was still level. The mechanism of the draws for each round was as follows:

- In the draw for the knockout round play-offs, the eight group runners-up were seeded, and the eight Europa League group third-placed teams were unseeded. The seeded teams were drawn against the unseeded teams, with the seeded teams hosting the second leg. Teams from the same association could not be drawn against each other. Since the identity of the Group G runners-up was not known at the time of the draw (due to the match between Tottenham Hotspur and Rennes not being played as scheduled), and could have been either Tottenham Hotspur or Vitesse, they could not be drawn against Leicester City or PSV Eindhoven.
- In the draw for the round of 16, the eight group winners were seeded, and the eight winners of the knockout round play-offs were unseeded. Again, the seeded teams were drawn against the unseeded teams, with the seeded teams hosting the second leg. Teams from the same association could not be drawn against each other.
- In the draws for the quarter-finals onwards, there were no seedings, and teams from the same association could be drawn against each other. As the draws for the quarter-finals and semi-finals were held together before the quarter-finals were played, the identity of the quarter-final winners was not known at the time of the semi-final draw. A draw was also held to determine which semi-final winner was designated as the "home" team for the final (for administrative purposes as it was played at a neutral venue).

== Schedule ==
The schedule was as follows (all draws were held at the UEFA headquarters in Nyon, Switzerland).

Round	Draw date	First leg	Second leg
Knockout round play-offs	13 December 2021, 14:00	17 February 2022	24 February 2022
Round of 16	25 February 2022, 13:00	10 March 2022	17 March 2022
Quarter-finals	18 March 2022, 15:00	7 April 2022	14 April 2022
Semi-finals	18 March 2022, 15:00	28 April 2022	5 May 2022
Final	18 March 2022, 15:00	25 May 2022 at Arena Kombëtare, Tirana	

== Bracket ==
Knockout round play-offs
(England) Leicester City	4	3	7
(Denmark) Randers	1	1	2
(Netherlands) PSV Eindhoven	1	1	2
(Israel) Maccabi Tel Aviv	0	1	1
(Scotland) Celtic	1	0	1
(Norway) Bodø/Glimt	3	2	5
(Austria) Rapid Wien	2	0	2
(Netherlands) Vitesse	1	2	3
(Czech Republic) Sparta Prague	0	1	1
(Serbia) Partizan	1	2	3
(Turkey) Fenerbahçe	2	2	4
(Czech Republic) Slavia Prague	3	3	6
(France) Marseille	3	3	6
(Azerbaijan) Qarabağ	1	0	1
(Denmark) Midtjylland	1	1	2 (3)
(Greece) PAOK (p)	0	2	2 (5)

Round of 16
(England) Leicester City	2	1	3
(France) Rennes	0	2	2
(Netherlands) PSV Eindhoven	4	4	8
(Denmark) Copenhagen	4	0	4
(Norway) Bodø/Glimt (a.e.t.)	2	2	4
(Netherlands) AZ	1	2	3
(Netherlands) Vitesse	0	1	1
(Italy) Roma	1	1	2
(Serbia) Partizan	2	1	3
(Netherlands) Feyenoord	5	3	8
(Czech Republic) Slavia Prague	4	3	7
(Austria) LASK	1	4	5
(France) Marseille	2	2	4
(Switzerland) Basel	1	1	2
(Greece) PAOK	1	2	3
(Belgium) Gent	0	1	1

Quarter-finals
(England) Leicester City	0	2	2
(Netherlands) PSV Eindhoven	0	1	1
(Norway) Bodø/Glimt	2	0	2
(Italy) Roma	1	4	5
(Netherlands) Feyenoord	3	3	6
(Czech Republic) Slavia Prague	3	1	4
(France) Marseille	2	1	3
(Greece) PAOK	1	0	1

Semi-finals
(England) Leicester City	1	0	1
(Italy) Roma	1	1	2
(Netherlands) Feyenoord	3	0	3
(France) Marseille	2	0	2

Final
25 May – Tirana
(Italy) Roma	1
(Netherlands) Feyenoord	0

== Knockout round play-offs ==
The draw for the knockout round play-offs was held on 13 December 2021, 14:00 CET.

=== Summary ===
The first legs were played on 17 February, and the second legs were played on 24 February 2022.

Team 1	Agg.	Team 2	1st leg	2nd leg
Marseille (France)	6–1	(Azerbaijan) Qarabağ	3–1	3–0
PSV Eindhoven (Netherlands)	2–1	(Israel) Maccabi Tel Aviv	1–0	1–1
Fenerbahçe (Turkey)	4–6	(Czech Republic) Slavia Prague	2–3	2–3
Midtjylland (Denmark)	2–2 (3–5 p)	(Greece) PAOK	1–0	1–2 (a.e.t.)
Leicester City (England)	7–2	(Denmark) Randers	4–1	3–1
Celtic (Scotland)	1–5	(Norway) Bodø/Glimt	1–3	0–2
Sparta Prague (Czech Republic)	1–3	(Serbia) Partizan	0–1	1–2
Rapid Wien (Austria)	2–3	(Netherlands) Vitesse	2–1	0–2

=== Matches ===
17 February 2022
21:00

Marseille (France)	3–1	(Azerbaijan) Qarabağ
Milik 41', 44'; Payet 90+2'	Report	Kady 85'

Stade Vélodrome, Marseille
Attendance: 25,713
Referee: Nikola Dabanović (Montenegro)
24 February 2022
18:45 (20:45 UTC+4)

Qarabağ (Azerbaijan)	0–3	(France) Marseille
	Report	Gueye 12'; Guendouzi 77'; De la Fuente 90+2'

Tofiq Bahramov Republican Stadium, Baku (Note: Qarabağ played their home match at Tofiq Bahramov Republican Stadium, Baku, instead of their regular stadium Azersun Arena, Baku, which did not meet UEFA requirements.)
Attendance: 27,783
Referee: Bartosz Frankowski (Poland)

Marseille won 6–1 on aggregate.

17 February 2022
18:45

PSV Eindhoven (Netherlands)	1–0	(Israel) Maccabi Tel Aviv
Gakpo 11'	Report

Philips Stadion, Eindhoven
Attendance: 14,280
Referee: Glenn Nyberg (Sweden)
24 February 2022
18:45 (19:45 UTC+3)

Maccabi Tel Aviv (Israel)	1–1	(Netherlands) PSV Eindhoven
Saborit 90+1'	Report	Vertessen 85'

Bloomfield Stadium, Tel Aviv
Attendance: 28,058
Referee: Harald Lechner (Austria)

PSV Eindhoven won 2–1 on aggregate.

17 February 2022
18:45 (19:45 UTC+3)

Fenerbahçe (Turkey)	2–3	(Czech Republic) Slavia Prague
Pelkas 58'; Kadıoğlu 83'	Report	Traoré 45'; Dorley 62'; Lingr 64'

Şükrü Saracoğlu Stadium, Istanbul
Attendance: 30,094
Referee: Maurizio Mariani (Italy)
24 February 2022
21:00

Slavia Prague (Czech Republic)	3–2	(Turkey) Fenerbahçe
Schranz 19'; Sor 27', 63'	Report	Yandaş 39'; Berisha 90'

Sinobo Stadium, Prague
Attendance: 10,120
Referee: Chris Kavanagh (England)

Slavia Prague won 6–4 on aggregate.

17 February 2022
18:45

Midtjylland (Denmark)	1–0	(Greece) PAOK
Andersson 20'	Report

MCH Arena, Herning
Attendance: 7,088
Referee: Craig Pawson (England)
24 February 2022
21:00 (22:00 UTC+3)

PAOK (Greece)	2–1 (a.e.t.)	(Denmark) Midtjylland
A. Živković 20'; Vieirinha 26'	Report	Høegh 80'
Penalties
Čolak (penalty scored); Sidcley (penalty scored); Schwab (penalty scored); Mitriță (penalty scored); Kurtić (penalty scored)	5–3	(penalty missed) Meyer; (penalty scored) Andersson; (penalty scored) Dyhr; (penalty scored) Lind

Toumba Stadium, Thessaloniki
Attendance: 7,468
Referee: Lawrence Visser (Belgium)

2–2 on aggregate; PAOK won 5–3 on penalties.

17 February 2022
21:00 (20:00 UTC+0)

Leicester City (England)	4–1	(Denmark) Randers
Ndidi 23'; Barnes 49'; Daka 55'; Dewsbury-Hall 74'	Report	Hammershøy-Mistrati 45'

King Power Stadium, Leicester
Attendance: 25,242
Referee: Radu Petrescu (Romania)
24 February 2022
18:45

Randers (Denmark)	1–3	(England) Leicester City
Odey 84'	Report	Barnes 2'; Maddison 70', 74'

Randers Stadium, Randers
Attendance: 8,948
Referee: Irfan Peljto (Bosnia and Herzegovina)

Leicester City won 7–2 on aggregate.

17 February 2022
21:00 (20:00 UTC+0)

Celtic (Scotland)	1–3	(Norway) Bodø/Glimt
Maeda 79'	Report	Espejord 7'; Pellegrino 55'; Vetlesen 81'

Celtic Park, Glasgow
Attendance: 54,926
Referee: Andris Treimanis (Latvia)
24 February 2022
18:45

Bodø/Glimt (Norway)	2–0	(Scotland) Celtic
Solbakken 9'; Vetlesen 69'	Report

Aspmyra Stadion, Bodø
Attendance: 5,801
Referee: Sergey Ivanov (Russia)

Bodø/Glimt won 5–1 on aggregate.

17 February 2022
21:00

Sparta Prague (Czech Republic)	0–1	(Serbia) Partizan
	Report	Menig 78'

Stadion Letná, Prague
Attendance: 1,000
Referee: Andreas Ekberg (Sweden)
24 February 2022
18:45

Partizan (Serbia)	2–1	(Czech Republic) Sparta Prague
Ricardo 7', 24'	Report	Hložek 85'

Partizan Stadium, Belgrade
Attendance: 13,864
Referee: Georgi Kabakov (Bulgaria)

Partizan won 3–1 on aggregate.

17 February 2022
18:45

Rapid Wien (Austria)	2–1	(Netherlands) Vitesse
Druijf 1'; Grüll 16'	Report	Openda 74'

Allianz Stadion, Vienna
Attendance: 10,700
Referee: Donatas Rumšas (Lithuania)
24 February 2022
21:00

Vitesse (Netherlands)	2–0	(Austria) Rapid Wien
Grbić 3'; Bero 19'	Report

GelreDome, Arnhem
Attendance: 13,517
Referee: Jakob Kehlet (Denmark)

Vitesse won 3–2 on aggregate.

== Round of 16 ==
The draw for the round of 16 was held on 25 February 2022, 13:00 CET.

=== Summary ===
The first legs were played on 10 March, and the second legs were played on 17 March 2022.

Team 1	Agg.	Team 2	1st leg	2nd leg
Marseille (France)	4–2	(Switzerland) Basel	2–1	2–1
Leicester City (England)	3–2	(France) Rennes	2–0	1–2
PAOK (Greece)	3–1	(Belgium) Gent	1–0	2–1
Vitesse (Netherlands)	1–2	(Italy) Roma	0–1	1–1
PSV Eindhoven (Netherlands)	8–4	(Denmark) Copenhagen	4–4	4–0
Slavia Prague (Czech Republic)	7–5	(Austria) LASK	4–1	3–4
Bodø/Glimt (Norway)	4–3	(Netherlands) AZ	2–1	2–2 (a.e.t.)
Partizan (Serbia)	3–8	(Netherlands) Feyenoord	2–5	1–3

=== Matches ===
10 March 2022
21:00

Marseille (France)	2–1	(Switzerland) Basel
Milik 19' (pen.), 68'	Report	Esposito 80'

Stade Vélodrome, Marseille
Attendance: 22,992
Referee: Irfan Peljto (Bosnia and Herzegovina)
17 March 2022
18:45

Basel (Switzerland)	1–2	(France) Marseille
Ndoye 62'	Report	Ünder 74'; Rongier 90+3'

St. Jakob-Park, Basel
Attendance: 22,081
Referee: Artur Soares Dias (Portugal)

Marseille won 4–2 on aggregate.

10 March 2022
21:00 (20:00 UTC+0)

Leicester City (England)	2–0	(France) Rennes
Albrighton 30'; Iheanacho 90+3'	Report

King Power Stadium, Leicester
Attendance: 25,848
Referee: Orel Grinfeld (Israel)
17 March 2022
18:45

Rennes (France)	2–1	(England) Leicester City
Bourigeaud 8'; Tait 76'	Report	Fofana 51'

Roazhon Park, Rennes
Attendance: 27,000
Referee: Anastasios Sidiropoulos (Greece)

Leicester City won 3–2 on aggregate.

10 March 2022
18:45 (19:45 UTC+3)

PAOK (Greece)	1–0	(Belgium) Gent
Kurtić 58'	Report

Toumba Stadium, Thessaloniki
Attendance: 9,098
Referee: Bartosz Frankowski (Poland)
17 March 2022
21:00

Gent (Belgium)	1–2	(Greece) PAOK
Depoitre 40'	Report	Crespo 20'; Douglas Augusto 77'

Ghelamco Arena, Ghent
Attendance: 12,388
Referee: Daniel Siebert (Germany)

PAOK won 3–1 on aggregate.

10 March 2022
18:45

Vitesse (Netherlands)	0–1	(Italy) Roma
	Report	Oliveira 45+1'

GelreDome, Arnhem
Attendance: 24,022
Referee: Paweł Raczkowski (Poland)
17 March 2022
21:00

Roma (Italy)	1–1	(Netherlands) Vitesse
Abraham 90+1'	Report	Wittek 62'

Stadio Olimpico, Rome
Attendance: 40,435
Referee: Radu Petrescu (Romania)

Roma won 2–1 on aggregate.

10 March 2022
21:00

PSV Eindhoven (Netherlands)	4–4	(Denmark) Copenhagen
Gakpo 21', 70'; Dōan 50'; Zahavi 85'	Report	Jóhannesson 6'; Biel 23', 78'; Lerager 43'

Philips Stadion, Eindhoven
Attendance: 26,003
Referee: Craig Pawson (England)
17 March 2022
18:45

Copenhagen (Denmark)	0–4	(Netherlands) PSV Eindhoven
	Report	Zahavi 10', 79'; Götze 38'; Madueke 90+1'

Parken Stadium, Copenhagen
Attendance: 30,337
Referee: Willie Collum (Scotland)

PSV Eindhoven won 8–4 on aggregate.

10 March 2022
18:45

Slavia Prague (Czech Republic)	4–1	(Austria) LASK
Sor 3', 29'; Olayinka 83'; Traoré 85'	Report	Balić 67'

Sinobo Stadium, Prague
Attendance: 16,754
Referee: Andris Treimanis (Latvia)
17 March 2022
21:00

LASK (Austria)	4–3	(Czech Republic) Slavia Prague
Wiesinger 36', 76'; Gruber 88'; Schmidt 90'	Report	Olayinka 24'; Bah 37'; Sor 62'

NV Arena, Sankt Pölten (Note: LASK played their home match at NV Arena, Sankt Pölten, instead of their regular stadium Linzer Stadion, Linz, due to renovation.)
Attendance: 5,403
Referee: Lawrence Visser (Belgium)

Slavia Prague won 7–5 on aggregate.

10 March 2022
21:00

Bodø/Glimt (Norway)	2–1	(Netherlands) AZ
Pellegrino 39'; Solbakken 90+1' (pen.)	Report	Aboukhlal 73'

Aspmyra Stadion, Bodø
Attendance: 5,724
Referee: Nikola Dabanović (Montenegro)
17 March 2022
18:45

AZ (Netherlands)	2–2 (a.e.t.)	(Norway) Bodø/Glimt
Pavlidis 18', 30'	Report	Pellegrino 26'; Sampsted 105+1'

AFAS Stadion, Alkmaar
Attendance: 15,024
Referee: Ivan Kružliak (Slovakia)

Bodø/Glimt won 4–3 on aggregate.

10 March 2022
18:45

Partizan (Serbia)	2–5	(Netherlands) Feyenoord
Natkho 13'; Jović 46'	Report	Toornstra 20', 77'; Dessers 52'; Geertruida 64'; Sinisterra 71'

Partizan Stadium, Belgrade
Attendance: 13,564
Referee: Maurizio Mariani (Italy)
17 March 2022
21:00

Feyenoord (Netherlands)	3–1	(Serbia) Partizan
Dessers 45'; Nelson 59'; Linssen 90'	Report	Gomes 61'

De Kuip, Rotterdam
Attendance: 40,850
Referee: Anthony Taylor (England)

Feyenoord won 8–3 on aggregate.

== Quarter-finals ==
The draw for the quarter-finals was held on 18 March 2022, 15:00 CET.

=== Summary ===
The first legs were played on 7 April, and the second legs were played on 14 April 2022.

Team 1	Agg.	Team 2	1st leg	2nd leg
Bodø/Glimt (Norway)	2–5	(Italy) Roma	2–1	0–4
Feyenoord (Netherlands)	6–4	(Czech Republic) Slavia Prague	3–3	3–1
Marseille (France)	3–1	(Greece) PAOK	2–1	1–0
Leicester City (England)	2–1	(Netherlands) PSV Eindhoven	0–0	2–1

=== Matches ===
7 April 2022
21:00

Bodø/Glimt (Norway)	2–1	(Italy) Roma
Saltnes 56'; Vetlesen 89'	Report	Pellegrini 43'

Aspmyra Stadion, Bodø
Attendance: 7,739
Referee: Serdar Gözübüyük (Netherlands)
14 April 2022
21:00

Roma (Italy)	4–0	(Norway) Bodø/Glimt
Abraham 5'; Zaniolo 23', 29', 49'	Report

Stadio Olimpico, Rome
Attendance: 61,942
Referee: José María Sánchez Martínez (Spain)

Roma won 5–2 on aggregate.

7 April 2022
18:45

Feyenoord (Netherlands)	3–3	(Czech Republic) Slavia Prague
Sinisterra 10'; Senesi 74'; Kökçü 86'	Report	Olayinka 41'; Sor 67'; Traoré 90+5'

De Kuip, Rotterdam
Attendance: 42,163
Referee: Halil Umut Meler (Turkey)
14 April 2022
21:00

Slavia Prague (Czech Republic)	1–3	(Netherlands) Feyenoord
Traoré 14'	Report	Dessers 2', 59'; Sinisterra 78'

Sinobo Stadium, Prague
Attendance: 19,370
Referee: Deniz Aytekin (Germany)

Feyenoord won 6–4 on aggregate.

7 April 2022
21:00

Marseille (France)	2–1	(Greece) PAOK
Gerson 13'; Payet 45'	Report	El Kaddouri 48'

Stade Vélodrome, Marseille
Attendance: 45,182
Referee: Szymon Marciniak (Poland)
14 April 2022
21:00 (22:00 UTC+3)

PAOK (Greece)	0–1	(France) Marseille
	Report	Payet 34'

Toumba Stadium, Thessaloniki
Attendance: 27,648
Referee: Danny Makkelie (Netherlands)

Marseille won 3–1 on aggregate.

7 April 2022
21:00 (20:00 UTC+1)

Leicester City (England)	0–0	(Netherlands) PSV Eindhoven
	Report

King Power Stadium, Leicester
Attendance: 31,327
Referee: Ivan Kružliak (Slovakia)
14 April 2022
18:45

PSV Eindhoven (Netherlands)	1–2	(England) Leicester City
Zahavi 27'	Report	Maddison 77'; Pereira 88'

Philips Stadion, Eindhoven
Attendance: 35,000
Referee: Benoît Bastien (France)

Leicester City won 2–1 on aggregate.

== Semi-finals ==
The draw for the semi-finals was held on 18 March 2022, 15:00 CET, after the quarter-final draw.

=== Summary ===
The first legs were played on 28 April, and the second legs were played on 5 May 2022.

Team 1	Agg.	Team 2	1st leg	2nd leg
Leicester City (England)	1–2	(Italy) Roma	1–1	0–1
Feyenoord (Netherlands)	3–2	(France) Marseille	3–2	0–0

=== Matches ===
28 April 2022
21:00 (20:00 UTC+1)

Leicester City (England)	1–1	(Italy) Roma
Mancini 67' (o.g.)	Report	Pellegrini 15'

King Power Stadium, Leicester
Attendance: 31,659
Referee: Carlos del Cerro Grande (Spain)
5 May 2022
21:00

Roma (Italy)	1–0	(England) Leicester City
Abraham 11'	Report

Stadio Olimpico, Rome
Attendance: 63,940
Referee: Srđan Jovanović (Serbia)

Roma won 2–1 on aggregate.

28 April 2022
21:00

Feyenoord (Netherlands)	3–2	(France) Marseille
Dessers 18', 46'; Sinisterra 20'	Report	Dieng 28'; Gerson 40'

De Kuip, Rotterdam
Attendance: 24,500
Referee: Michael Oliver (England)
5 May 2022
21:00

Marseille (France)	0–0	(Netherlands) Feyenoord
	Report

Stade Vélodrome, Marseille
Attendance: 49,315
Referee: Sandro Schärer (Switzerland)

Feyenoord won 3–2 on aggregate.

== Final ==
The final was played on 25 May 2022 at the Arena Kombëtare in Tirana. A draw was held on 18 March 2022, after the quarter-final and semi-final draws, to determine the "home" team for administrative purposes.

25 May 2022
21:00

Roma (Italy)	1–0	(Netherlands) Feyenoord
Zaniolo 32'	Report

Arena Kombëtare, Tirana
Attendance: 19,597
Referee: István Kovács (Romania)
