= SBV Vitesse in European football =

SBV Vitesse in European football includes the games which are played by SBV Vitesse in competitions organised by UEFA.

== History ==
=== 1990s: Establishing a European Presence ===
SBV Vitesse made its European debut in the 1990–91 UEFA Cup. In the first round, they faced Derry City F.C., securing a 1–0 aggregate victory. The second round saw them triumph over Dundee United F.C. with a 5–0 aggregate score. Their journey concluded in the third round against Sporting CP, with a 1–4 aggregate loss. The club continued to participate in the UEFA Cup throughout the decade, with notable matches against teams like Real Madrid CF in the 1992–93 UEFA Cup and Parma in 1994–95 UEFA Cup. Their best performance came in the 1992–93 UEFA Cup, reaching the third round before being eliminated by Real Madrid CF.

=== 2000s: Consistent European Engagements ===
The early 2000s saw SBV Vitesse maintaining its presence in European competitions. In the 2000–01 UEFA Cup, they faced Maccabi Haifa F.C. in the first round, advancing with a 4–2 aggregate win. The second round paired them against Inter Milan, where they were eliminated on away goals after a 1–1 aggregate draw. The 2002–03 UEFA Cup was particularly eventful; Vitesse advanced past FC Rapid București and SV Werder Bremen before being ousted by Liverpool F.C. in the third round.

=== 2010s: Return to European Competitions ===
After a brief hiatus, SBV Vitesse returned to European football in the 2012–13 Europa League. They faced PFC Lokomotiv Plovdiv in the second qualifying round, progressing with a 7–5 aggregate score. However, their campaign ended in the third qualifying round against FC Anzhi Makhachkala. The 2017–18 season marked Vitesse's debut in the UEFA Europa League group stage, where they competed against S.S. Lazio, OGC Nice, and S.V. Zulte Waregem, ultimately finishing fourth in their group.

=== 2020s: Inaugural UEFA Europa Conference League Participation ===
In the 2021–22 season, Vitesse participated in the inaugural UEFA Europa Conference League. They advanced through the qualifying rounds, defeating Dundalk FC and R.S.C. Anderlecht to reach the group stage. Placed in Group G alongside Tottenham Hotspur F.C., Stade Rennais F.C., and NŠ Mura, SBV Vitesse finished second, progressing to the knockout round playoffs. Their European journey concluded in the round of 16 against A.S. Roma, with a 1–2 aggregate loss.

== Totals ==
Competition	Participations	Games	Won	Draw	Lost	Goals scored	Goals conceded
UEFA Europa League	5	18	3	5	10	19	32
UEFA Cup	10	36	14	9	13	40	37
UEFA Conference League	1	14	6	4	4	25	20
Total	16	68	23	18	27	84	89

== Top scorers ==
As of 8 December 2023

#	Goals	Name	Last score	Tournament
1	5	(Germany) Maximilian Wittek	17 Mar 2022	Conference League
2	4	(Belgium) Bob Peeters	3 Oct 2002	UEFA Cup
2	4	(Netherlands) Bryan Linssen	2 Aug 2018	Europa League
2	4	(Netherlands) John van den Brom	21 Oct 1992	UEFA Cup
2	4	(Belgium) Loïs Openda	17 Feb 2022	Conference League
2	4	(Slovakia) Matúš Bero	24 Feb 2022	Conference League
7	3	(Netherlands) Marco van Ginkel	26 Jul 2012	Europa League
7	3	(Ghana) Matthew Amoah	31 Oct 2002	UEFA Cup
7	3	(Greece) Nikos Machlas	29 Sep 1998	UEFA Cup
7	3	(Slovenia) Tim Matavž	2 Aug 2018	Europa League

== Competitions by Countries ==
As of 8 December 2023

#	Country	Games	Won	Draw	Lost	Goals Scored	Goals Against	Opponents
1	England	8	1	1	6	3	13	Liverpool F.C. (2), Norwich City F.C. (2), Southampton F.C. (2), Tottenham Hotspur F.C. (2)
1	France	8	1	2	5	8	16	Bordeaux (2), RC Lens (2), OGC Nice (2), Stade Rennais F.C. (2)
1	Italy	8	1	4	3	6	9	Inter Milan (2), S.S. Lazio (2), Parma (2), A.S. Roma (2)
4	Belgium	6	3	2	1	8	7	R.S.C. Anderlecht (2), KV Mechelen (2), S.V. Zulte Waregem (2)
4	(Republic of Ireland) Ireland	6	4	2	0	10	4	Derry City F.C. (4), Dundalk FC (2)
4	Portugal	6	2	1	3	5	8	S.C. Beira-Mar (2), S.C. Braga (2), Sporting CP (2)
4	Romania	6	2	3	1	9	7	FC Petrolul Ploiești (2), FC Rapid București (2), FC Viitorul Constanța (2)
8	Austria	2	1	0	1	3	2	SK Rapid Wien (2)
8	Bulgaria	2	1	0	1	7	5	PFC Lokomotiv Plovdiv (2)
8	Germany	2	1	1	0	5	4	SV Werder Bremen (2)
8	Greece	2	1	1	0	6	3	AEK Athens F.C. (2)
8	Israel	2	1	0	1	4	2	Maccabi Haifa F.C. (2)
8	Russia	2	0	0	2	0	4	FC Anzhi Makhachkala (2)
8	Scotland	2	2	0	0	5	0	Dundee United F.C. (2)
8	Slovenia	2	2	0	0	5	1	NŠ Mura (2)
8	Spain	2	0	0	2	0	2	Real Madrid CF (2)
8	Switzerland	2	0	0	2	0	2	FC Basel (2)

== Most Played Team ==
Rank	Team	Country	Games	Won	Draw	Lost	Goals Scored	Goals Against
1	Derry City F.C.	(Republic of Ireland) Ireland	4	3	1	0	6	1

== European match history ==
As of 8 December 2023

Competition	Round	Opponent	Home	Away	Aggregate
1990–91 UEFA Cup	1st round	(Republic of Ireland) Derry City F.C.	0–0	1–0	1–0
1990–91 UEFA Cup	2nd round	(Scotland) Dundee United F.C.	1–0	4–0	5–0
1990–91 UEFA Cup	3rd round	(Portugal) Sporting CP	0–2	1–2	1–4
1992–93 UEFA Cup	1st round	(Republic of Ireland) Derry City F.C.	3–0	2–1	5–1
1992–93 UEFA Cup	2nd round	(Belgium) K.V. Mechelen	1–0	1–0	2–0
1992–93 UEFA Cup	3rd round	(Spain) Real Madrid CF	0–1	0–1	0–2
1993–94 UEFA Cup	1st round	(England) Norwich City F.C.	0–0	0–3	0–3
1994–95 UEFA Cup	1st round	(Italy) Parma	1–0	0–2	1–2
1997–98 UEFA Cup	1st round	(Portugal) S.C. Braga	2–1	0–2	2–3
1998–99 UEFA Cup	1st round	(Greece) AEK Athens F.C.	3–0	3–3	6–3
1998–99 UEFA Cup	2nd round	(France) Bordeaux	0–1	1–2	1–3
1999–2000 UEFA Cup	1st round	(Portugal) S.C. Beira-Mar	0–0	2–1	2–1
1999–2000 UEFA Cup	2nd round	(France) RC Lens	1–1	1–4	2–5
2000–01 UEFA Cup	1st round	(Israel) Maccabi Haifa F.C.	3–0	1–2	4–2
2000–01 UEFA Cup	2nd round	(Italy) Inter Milan	1–1	0–0	1–1 (a)
2002–03 UEFA Cup	1st round	(Romania) FC Rapid București	1–1	1–0	2–1
2002–03 UEFA Cup	2nd round	(Germany) SV Werder Bremen	2–1	3–3	5–4
2002–03 UEFA Cup	3rd round	(England) Liverpool F.C.	0–1	0–1	0–2
2012–13 Europa League	Second qualifying round	(Bulgaria) PFC Lokomotiv Plovdiv	3–1	4–4	7–5
2012–13 Europa League	Third qualifying round	(Russia) FC Anzhi Makhachkala	0–2	0–2	0–4
2013–14 Europa League	3rd qualifying round	(Romania) FC Petrolul Ploiești	1–2	1–1	2–3
2015–16 Europa League	3rd qualifying round	(England) Southampton F.C.	0–2	0–3	0–5
2017–18 Europa League	Group stage	(Italy) SS Lazio	2–3	1–1	4th
2017–18 Europa League	Group stage	(France) OGC Nice	1–0	0–3	4th
2017–18 Europa League	Group stage	(Belgium) S.V. Zulte Waregem	0–2	1–1	4th
2018–19 Europa League	2nd qualifying round	(Romania) FC Viitorul Constanța	3–1	2–2	5–3
2018–19 Europa League	3rd qualifying round	(Switzerland) FC Basel	0–1	0–1	0–2
2021–22 Conference League	3rd qualifying round	(Republic of Ireland) Dundalk F.C.	2–2	2–1	4–3
2021–22 Conference League	Play-off round	(Belgium) R.S.C. Anderlecht	2–1	3–3	5–4
2021–22 Conference League	Group stage	(Slovenia) NŠ Mura	3–1	2–0	2nd
2021–22 Conference League	Group stage	(France) Stade Rennais F.C.	1–2	3–3	2nd
2021–22 Conference League	Group stage	(England) Tottenham Hotspur F.C.	1–0	2–3	2nd
2021–22 Conference League	Round of 32	(Austria) SK Rapid Wien	2–0	1–2	3–2
2021–22 Conference League	Round of 16	(Italy) AS Roma	0–1	1–1	1–2
