= Hugues Wembangomo =

Norwegian footballer (born 1992)

Personal information
- Date of birth: 10 May 1992 (age 34)
- Place of birth: Kinshasa, Zaire
- Height: 1.84 m (6 ft 0 in)
- Position: Right-back

Youth career
- Tveter IL
- Borgen IL

Senior career*
Years	Team	Apps	(Gls)
2009–2011	Sarpsborg 08	43	(0)
2012–2014	Aalesund	27	(0)
2015	Bærum	12	(0)
2016–2017	Hødd	27	(0)
2017	→ Brattvåg IL (loan)	25	(1)
2018	Brattvåg IL	13	(0)
Total		147	(1)

International career
2009	Norway U17	10	(0)
2009–2010	Norway U18	10	(0)
2010	Norway U19	5	(0)
- * Club domestic league appearances and goals

Hugues Wembangomo (born 10 May 1992) is a former professional footballer who played as a right-back. He has previously played for Sarpsborg 08 and Aalesund. Born in Zaire, he has represented Norway at youth international level.

== Early life ==
Wembangomo was born in Kinshasa, Zaire, and moved to Østfold in Norway with his family when he was nine years old. He is the brother of the footballer Brice Wembangomo.

== Club career ==
During his youth he played for Tveter IL and Borgen IL before he moved to the then second tier team Sarpsborg 08 in late 2008. In 2010, Sarpsborg was promoted to Tippeligaen and on 17 April 2011 he made his debut in Norway's top league when he replaced Berat Jusufi after 70 minutes in the match against Strømsgodset. In total he played 19 matches for Sarpsborg in Tippeligaen in 2011.

Sarpsborg was relegated after the 2011-season, and on 24 February 2012 Wembangomo transferred to Aalesund. In his new club he got a slow start, as he got an injury two days before he signed for Aalesund. When he again was fit from his injury, Aalesund had re-signed the player Wembangomo was supposed to replace on the right back, Enar Jääger.

Two and a half-month after he signed for Aalesund, he made his debut for the first-team against Skarbøvik in the Second Round of the 2012 Norwegian Cup. While Jääger was the first-choice on the right back, Wembangomo played at the left back while Jo Nymo Matland was injured. In the winter of 2014 he sustained an achilles injury, and was let go. After half a year without a club, he was signed by Bærum SK in July 2015. Leaving Bærum after half a season, at the end of the season, he eventually went back to Sunnmøre and IL Hødd. In 2018, he played for Brattvåg IL, eventually captaining the side.

== International career ==
Wembangomo has been capped for Norway several times at youth international level. While he is eligible to play for both Norway and DR Congo, he stated in an interview with Sunnmørsposten in June 2012 that he would choose Norway if he gets the opportunity.

== Career statistics ==
Appearances and goals by club, season and competition
Season	Club	League			Cup		Total	
Season	Club	Division	Apps	Goals	Apps	Goals	Apps	Goals
Sarpsborg 08	2009	Adeccoligaen	10	0	0	0	10	0
Sarpsborg 08	2010	Adeccoligaen	14	0	2	0	16	0
Sarpsborg 08	2011	Tippeligaen	19	0	1	0	20	0
Aalesund	2012	Tippeligaen	12	0	2	0	14	0
Aalesund	2013	Tippeligaen	11	0	2	0	13	0
Aalesund	2014	Tippeligaen	4	0	1	0	5	0
Bærum	2015	Norwegian First Division	12	0	0	0	12	0
Hødd	2016	Norwegian First Division	27	0	0	0	27	0
Brattvåg IL (loan)	2017	Norwegian Third Division	25	1	1	0	26	1
Brattvåg IL	2018	Norwegian Second Division	13	0	3	0	16	0
Career total			147	1	12	0	159	1
