= Axel Lindahl (footballer) =

Swedish footballer (born 1995)

Personal information
- Full name: Karl Axel Lindahl
- Date of birth: 4 April 1995 (age 31)
- Place of birth: Lidköping, Sweden
- Height: 1.80 m (5 ft 11 in)
- Positions: Midfielder; right-back

Team information
- Current team: Östers IF
- Number: 2

Youth career
- Lidköpings IF

Senior career*
Years	Team	Apps	(Gls)
2013–2015	Lidköpings FK	47	(9)
2016–2017	Oskarshamns AIK	44	(2)
2018	Jönköpings Södra IF	7	(0)
2019–2020	Degerfors IF	56	(2)
2021	Bodø/Glimt	10	(1)
2021	→ Degerfors IF (loan)	15	(1)
2022–2024	Kalmar FF	50	(1)
2024	→ BK Häcken (loan)	8	(0)
2024	BK Häcken	3	(0)
2025–	Östers IF	1	(0)
- * Club domestic league appearances and goals as of 7 May 2025

Axel Lindahl (born 4 April 1995) is a Swedish professional footballer who plays as a midfielder or right-back for Allsvenskan club Östers IF.

== Career ==
Lindahl began his senior career at his hometown club Lidköpings IF, which later became Lidköpings FK. He made 14 appearances and scored one goal in Division 4 during the 2011 season. The following year, he played 10 matches and scored five goals for Lidköpings FK Akademi, also in Division 4. Between 2013 and 2015, he featured for Lidköpings FK in both Division 3 and Division 2.

In March 2016, Lindahl joined Oskarshamns AIK on a two-year contract. He moved to Jönköpings Södra IF in November 2017, signing a three-year deal. Lindahl made his debut in the Superettan on 23 May 2018, coming on as a 69th-minute substitute for Árni Vilhjálmsson in a 2–2 draw against Degerfors IF.

Lindahl signed a three-year contract with Degerfors IF in December 2018. He played all 30 league matches and scored once during the 2020 season, as the club secured promotion to the Allsvenskan.

On 1 February 2021, Lindahl joined Norwegian top-flight side Bodø/Glimt on a three-year contract. After limited playing opportunities, he returned to Degerfors IF on loan in August 2021. He made his Allsvenskan debut on 15 August, appearing as a 78th-minute substitute in a 3–0 victory against BK Häcken.

In January 2022, Lindahl transferred to Kalmar FF, agreeing to a three-year contract. In March 2024, he joined BK Häcken on loan until the summer, and in June 2024, the move was made permanent. He signed a one-and-a-half-year deal with an option for a further year.

On 29 January 2025, Lindahl signed a long-term contract with newly promoted Allsvenskan club Östers IF. In the beginning of 2026, Östers made a status update about Lindahl, saying that he had been troubled by a serious knee injury for a long period and he in that case will miss the 2026-season.

== Honours ==
Bodø/Glimt

- Eliteserien: 2021
