= Brice Wembangomo =

Footballer (born 1996)

Personal information
- Date of birth: 18 December 1996 (age 29)
- Place of birth: Kinshasa, Zaire
- Height: 1.80 m (5 ft 11 in)
- Position: Right-back

Team information
- Current team: Häcken
- Number: 5

Youth career
- 2003–2011: Skjeberg/Tveter
- 2011–2012: Sarpsborg FK
- 2013–2014: Sarpsborg 08

Senior career*
Years	Team	Apps	(Gls)
2014–2016	Sarpsborg 08	1	(0)
2015	→ Kvik Halden (loan)	26	(6)
2016	→ Fredrikstad (loan)	9	(0)
2017–2018	Jerv	57	(1)
2019–2021	Sandefjord	59	(0)
2022–2025	Bodø/Glimt	67	(3)
2025–	Häcken	23	(0)

International career^{‡}
2023	Norway	1	(0)
- * Club domestic league appearances and goals as of 15 August 2026 ‡ National team caps and goals as of 4 June 2023

Brice Wembangomo (born 18 December 1996) is a professional footballer who plays as a right-back for Allsvenskan club Häcken. Born in Zaire, he plays for the Norway national team.

== Early life ==
Wembangomo was born in Kinshasa, Zaire, and moved to Østfold in Norway with his family when he was a child. He is the brother of the footballer Hugues Wembangomo.

== Club career ==
Wembangomo started his career as a child in the tiny club Tveter IL, then Skjeberg SK. He joined Sarpsborg 08 from Sarpsborg FK while a youth player, and made his senior debut in Eliteserien for Sarpsborg 08 in September 2014 against Start. After this one game he was sent on loan to Kvik Halden FK in the entire 2015 season, and to Fredrikstad FK in the latter part of 2016. After this he moved permanently to FK Jerv in 2017 and further on to Sandefjord Fotball in 2019. In June 2020 he played the season opener for Sandefjord, his first first-tier game in six years and his second Eliteserien game overall.

=== Bodø/Glimt ===
On 3 January 2022, Bodø/Glimt announced that they had signed Wembangomo on a three-year contract that would run until December 2024. His official club debut came on 17 February as a starter at left-back in a 3–1 victory in the UEFA Europa Conference League over Celtic at Celtic Park. He made his debut in the domestic league on the opening day of the season as a starter against Rosenborg in a 2–2 draw, providing an assist for Runar Espejord for Bodø's second goal.

Having never represented a youth national team, Wembangomo received his first international callup for Norway in June 2023. He won his first cap as a substitute against Cyprus.

== Personal life ==
He is a younger brother of Hugues Wembangomo.

== Career statistics ==
=== Club ===
As of match played 9 August 2026

Appearances and goals by club, season and competition
Club	Season	League			National cup		Continental		Total	
Club	Season	Division	Apps	Goals	Apps	Goals	Apps	Goals	Apps	Goals
Sarpsborg 08	2014	Eliteserien	1	0	0	0	–		1	0
Kvik Halden (loan)	2015	2. divisjon	26	6	4	0	–		30	6
Fredrikstad (loan)	2016	1. divisjon	9	0	0	0	–		9	0
Jerv	2017	1. divisjon	29	0	3	0	–		32	0
Jerv	2018	1. divisjon	28	1	2	0	–		30	1
Jerv	Total		57	1	5	0	0	0	62	1
Sandefjord	2019	1. divisjon	17	0	2	0	–		19	0
Sandefjord	2020	Eliteserien	18	0	–		–		18	0
Sandefjord	2021	Eliteserien	24	0	0	0	–		24	0
Sandefjord	Total		59	0	2	0	0	0	61	0
Bodø/Glimt	2022	Eliteserien	28	2	7	0	18	0	53	2
Bodø/Glimt	2023	Eliteserien	22	1	4	0	12	0	38	1
Bodø/Glimt	2024	Eliteserien	17	0	2	1	5	0	24	1
Bodø/Glimt	2025	Eliteserien	0	0	0	0	3	1	3	1
Bodø/Glimt	Total		67	3	13	1	38	1	118	5
Häcken	2025	Allsvenskan	7	0	0	0	5	0	12	0
Häcken	2026	Allsvenskan	16	0	3	0	0	0	19	0
Häcken	Total		23	0	3	0	5	0	31	0
Career total			242	10	27	1	43	1	313	12

== Honours ==
Bodø/Glimt

- Eliteserien: 2023, 2024
