= Elias Hagen =

Norwegian footballer (born 2000)

Personal information
- Full name: Elias Kristoffersen Hagen
- Date of birth: 20 January 2000 (age 26)
- Place of birth: Oslo, Norway
- Height: 1.88 m (6 ft 2 in)
- Position: Midfielder

Team information
- Current team: Aalesund (on loan from Vålerenga)
- Number: 18

Youth career
- –2013: Veitvet
- 2014: Kjelsås
- 2015–2017: Lillestrøm

Senior career*
Years	Team	Apps	(Gls)
2018–2020	Grorud	57	(8)
2020–2022	Bodø/Glimt	47	(0)
2023	IFK Göteborg	15	(1)
2023–	Vålerenga	63	(7)
2026–	→ Aalesund (loan)	20	(4)

International career^{‡}
2018	Norway U18	3	(0)
2019	Norway U19	8	(0)
2022	Norway U21	1	(0)
- * Club domestic league appearances and goals as of 11 October 2026 ‡ National team caps and goals as of 19:46, 2 April 2023 (UTC)

Elias Kristoffersen Hagen (born 20 January 2000) is a Norwegian professional footballer who plays as a midfielder for Aalesund, on loan from Vålerenga.

== Club career ==
Kristoffersen Hagen made his senior debut for Bodø/Glimt on 13 September 2020 against Odd; Bodø/Glimt won 6–1. January 4, 2023 he was presented as a player for IFK Göteborg.

== Career ==
Kristoffersen Hagen was raised in the youth ranks of Lillestrøm. He was signed by Grorud in 2018 and made his 2nd division debut for the club on 15 April. He played as a starter in the 1–2 win at Hønefoss, where he scored both goals for his team. In the 2019 championship, he contributed to Grorud's promotion to the Norwegian First Division.

In the summer of 2020, Elias Kristoffersen Hagen joined FK Bodø/Glimt. He made his debut in a league match against Odds BK on September 13, 2020. He took over from Victor Boniface and his team scored six goals to one to win the game.

In 2020, he was crowned the Norwegian Champion.

== Career statistics ==
=== Club ===
As of 11 October 2026

Appearances and goals by club, season and competition
Club	Season	League			National Cup (Note: Includes Norwegian Football Cup, Svenska Cupen)		Other		Total	
Club	Season	Division	Apps	Goals	Apps	Goals	Apps	Goals	Apps	Goals
Grorud	2018	PostNord-ligaen	24	6	2	0	–		26	6
Grorud	2019	PostNord-ligaen	21	2	2	1	–		23	3
Grorud	2020	OBOS-ligaen	12	0	–		–		12	0
Grorud	Total		57	8	4	1	-		61	9
Bodø/Glimt	2020	Eliteserien	8	0	–		0	0	8	0
Bodø/Glimt	2021	Eliteserien	17	0	3	1	8 (Note: One appearance in the UEFA Champions League, and seven appearances in the UEFA Europa Conference League)	1	28	2
Bodø/Glimt	2022	Eliteserien	22	0	5	3	15 (Note: Six appearances in the UEFA Europa League, eight appearances in the UEFA Champions League, and one appearance in the UEFA Europa Conference League)	0	42	3
Bodø/Glimt	Total		47	0	8	4	23	1	78	5
IFK Göteborg	2023	Allsvenskan	15	1	3	1	–		18	2
IFK Göteborg	Total		15	1	3	1	–		18	2
Vålerenga	2023	Eliteserien	15	1	1	0	2 (Note: Appearances in the Eliteserien play-offs)	0	18	1
Vålerenga	2024	OBOS-ligaen	17	3	5	1	0	0	22	4
Vålerenga	2025	Eliteserien	30	3	1	1	0	0	31	4
Vålerenga	2026	Eliteserien	1	0	0	0	0	0	1	0
Vålerenga	Total		63	7	7	2	2	0	72	9
Aalesund (loan)	2026	Eliteserien	20	4	2	2	–		22	6
Aalesund (loan)	Total		20	4	2	2	–		22	6
Career total			202	20	24	10	25	1	251	31

== Honours ==
Bodø/Glimt

- Eliteserien: 2020, 2021

Vålerenga

- Norwegian First Division: 2024
