= Amahl Pellegrino =

Norwegian footballer (born 1990)

- Pellegrino in 2026

Personal information
- Full name: Amahl William D'vaz Pellegrino
- Date of birth: 18 June 1990 (age 36)
- Place of birth: Drammen, Norway
- Height: 1.90 m (6 ft 3 in)
- Positions: Left winger; forward

Team information
- Current team: San Diego FC
- Number: 90

Youth career
- Drammen

Senior career*
Years	Team	Apps	(Gls)
2009–2011	Drammen	32	(7)
2012–2014	Bærum	68	(33)
2014–2015	Lillestrøm	20	(0)
2015–2017	Mjøndalen	70	(28)
2018–2019	Strømsgodset	39	(4)
2019–2021	Kristiansund	39	(33)
2021	Damac	12	(2)
2021–2024	Bodø/Glimt	71	(55)
2024–2025	San Jose Earthquakes	45	(8)
2025–	San Diego FC	36	(9)
- * Club domestic league appearances and goals as of 20 November 2026

Amahl William D'vaz Pellegrino (born 18 June 1990) is a Norwegian professional footballer who plays as a left winger or forward for Major League Soccer club San Diego FC.

== Club career ==
=== Early career ===
Pellegrino started his career in Drammen FK, before moving to Bærum SK at the age of 22. Bærum played in the 2012 Norwegian First Division, was relegated that year, but won promotion again in 2013. In the summer of 2014, Pellegrino signed for top-tier club Lillestrøm SK. He made his league debut for the club in August 2014 against FK Haugesund. Following a tenure completely without league goals, he went on to Mjøndalen IF in the summer of 2015, but the club was relegated the same year. After failing to win promotion with Mjøndalen in 2016 and 2017, he achieved his childhood dream by signing a two-year contract with his home town Eliteserien club Strømsgodset on 20 November 2017.

After being played mostly on the wing, he failed to succeed in Strømsgodset and was sold to Kristiansund in the 2019 season. There, he prospered with the team and scored 33 goals in 39 league matches.

=== Damac ===
On 25 January 2021, he moved from Kristiansund to Damac in the Saudi Pro League for an undisclosed fee. He scored his only goals for the club in a 3–2 win over Al-Nassr in the Pro League on 9 April 2021.

=== Bodø/Glimt ===
He returned home to Norway on 17 August 2021 to join Bodø/Glimt on a free transfer. There, he found his place in the team, scoring 35 goals in his first 58 matches in all tournaments, including 9 in 21 matches in Europe. In his first season at Bodø/Glimt, he helped the club retain their title as Eliteserien champions with a 3–0 win over Mjøndalen in the final match of the league season.

Pellegrino netted 25 times during the 2022 Eliteserien season to finish as the league's top scorer, nine more goals than the league's second top scorer, teammate Hugo Vetlesen.

Pellegrino finished the 2023 Eliteserien season as the league's top scorer again with 24 goals. He was also named the league's player of the year as the club won their third league title in just four years.

=== San Jose Earthquakes ===
On 9 February 2024, Pellegrino joined MLS side San Jose Earthquakes on a two-year deal for an undisclosed fee.

=== San Diego FC ===
On 22 August 2025, he was acquired by fellow MLS club San Diego FC.

== International career ==
In December 2023, Pellegrino was pre-called up by the Tanzania national football team for the 2023 Africa Cup of Nations.

== Personal life ==
Pellegrino was born in Norway to Tanzanian parents.

== Career statistics ==
As of match played 8 November 2026

Appearances and goals by club, season and competition
Club	Season	League			National cup (Note: Includes Norwegian Cup, U.S. Open Cup)		Continental		Other		Total	
Club	Season	Division	Apps	Goals	Apps	Goals	Apps	Goals	Apps	Goals	Apps	Goals
Bærum	2012	1. divisjon	25	6	1	0	–		–		26	6
Bærum	2013	2. divisjon	25	17	2	1	–		–		27	18
Bærum	2014	1. divisjon	18	10	2	1	–		–		20	11
Bærum	Total		68	33	5	2	–		–		73	35
Lillestrøm	2014	Eliteserien	7	0	1	0	–		–		8	0
Lillestrøm	2015	Eliteserien	13	0	2	3	–		–		15	3
Lillestrøm	Total		20	0	3	3	–		–		23	3
Mjøndalen	2015	Eliteserien	11	2	1	0	–		–		12	2
Mjøndalen	2016	1. divisjon	30	8	2	3	–		–		32	11
Mjøndalen	2017	1. divisjon	29	18	4	2	–		–		33	20
Mjøndalen	Total		70	28	7	5	–		–		77	33
Strømsgodset	2018	Eliteserien	25	2	7	2	–		–		32	4
Strømsgodset	2019	Eliteserien	14	2	2	2	–		–		16	4
Strømsgodset	Total		39	4	9	4	–		–		48	8
Kristiansund	2019	Eliteserien	10	8	0	0	–		–		10	8
Kristiansund	2020	Eliteserien	29	25	0	0	–		–		29	25
Kristiansund	Total		39	33	0	0	–		–		39	33
Damac	2020–21	Saudi Pro League	12	2	–		–		–		12	2
Bodø/Glimt	2021	Eliteserien	15	6	0	0	13 (Note: Appearances in UEFA Europa Conference League)	5	–		28	11
Bodø/Glimt	2022	Eliteserien	27	25	2	1	14 (Note: Seven appearances and four goals in UEFA Champions League, five appearances and one goal in UEFA Europa League, two appearances in UEFA Europa Conference League)	5	–		43	31
Bodø/Glimt	2023	Eliteserien	29	24	8	2	13	7	–		47	33
Bodø/Glimt	Total		71	55	10	3	40	17	–		121	75
San Jose Earthquakes	2024	Major League Soccer	32	7	1	0	–		4 (Note: Appearances in Leagues Cup)	0	37	7
San Jose Earthquakes	2025	Major League Soccer	13	1	1	1	–		–		14	2
San Jose Earthquakes	Total		45	8	2	1	–		4	0	51	9
San Diego	2025	Major League Soccer	12	6	–		–		3 (Note: Appearances in MLS Cup playoffs)	3	15	9
San Diego	2026	Major League Soccer	24	3	–		4 (Note: Appearances in CONCACAF Champions Cup)	0	–		28	3
San Diego	Total		36	9	0	0	4	0	3	3	43	12
Career total			400	172	36	20	44	17	7	3	487	212

== Honours ==
Bodø/Glimt

- Eliteserien: 2021, 2023

Individual

- Eliteserien Top scorer: 2022, 2023
- Eliteserien Player of the Month: July 2022, April 2023, September 2023
- Eliteserien Player of the Year: 2023
