= Adan Abadala Hussein =

Norwegian footballer (born 2002)

Adan Hussein
Personal information
- Full name: Adan Abadala Hussein
- Date of birth: 13 October 2002 (age 24)
- Place of birth: Bø, Norway
- Height: 1.75 m (5 ft 9 in)
- Position: Midfielder

Team information
- Current team: Junkeren
- Number: 15

Youth career
- 2014–2017: Luna
- 2018–2021: Bodø/Glimt

Senior career*
| Years | Team | Apps | (Gls) |
| 2020–2022 | Bodø/Glimt | 1 | (0) |
| 2020 | → IL Stjørdals-Blink (loan) | 3 | (0) |
| 2021 | → Florø (loan) | 10 | (0) |
| 2023–2024 | Moss | 17 | (0) |
| 2023 | → Tromsdalen (loan) | 0 | (0) |
| 2024 | Raufoss | 2 | (0) |
| 2025 | Stjørdals-Blink | 3 | (0) |
| 2026– | Junkeren | 22 | (2) |

International career^{‡}
| 2019 | Norway U17 | 4 | (0) |
- * Club domestic league appearances and goals as of 31 October 2026 ‡ National team caps and goals as of 24 January 2023

Adan Abadala Hussein (born 13 October 2002) is a Norwegian footballer who plays as a midfielder for Junkeren.

== Club career ==
Hussein was born in Bø Municipality. He made his senior debut for Bodø/Glimt on 22 August 2020 against Start; Bodø/Glimt won 6–0.

In October 2020, Hussein was loaned out to 1. divisjon club Stjørdals-Blink for the rest of the season.

In April 2021, Hussein was loaned out to 2. divisjon club Florø for the remainder of the season.

== Career statistics ==
=== Club ===
As of match played 31 October 2026

Appearances and goals by club, season and competition
| Club | Season | League | | | National Cup | | Continental | | Total | |
| Club | Season | Division | Apps | Goals | Apps | Goals | Apps | Goals | Apps | Goals |
|---|---|---|---|---|---|---|---|---|---|---|
| Bodø/Glimt | 2020 | Eliteserien | 1 | 0 | 0 | 0 | - | | 1 | 0 |
| Bodø/Glimt | 2022 | Eliteserien | 0 | 0 | 0 | 0 | - | | 0 | 0 |
| Bodø/Glimt | Total | | 1 | 0 | 0 | 0 | - | | 1 | 0 |
| Stjørdals-Blink (loan) | 2020 | 1. divisjon | 3 | 0 | 0 | 0 | - | | 3 | 0 |
| Florø (loan) | 2021 | 2. divisjon | 10 | 0 | 0 | 0 | - | | 10 | 0 |
| Tromsdalen (loan) | 2023 | 2. divisjon | 0 | 0 | 0 | 0 | - | | 0 | 0 |
| Moss | 2023 | OBOS-ligaen | 11 | 0 | 2 | 0 | - | | 13 | 0 |
| Moss | 2024 | OBOS-ligaen | 6 | 0 | 1 | 1 | - | | 7 | 1 |
| Moss | Total | | 17 | 0 | 3 | 1 | - | | 20 | 1 |
| Raufoss | 2024 | OBOS-ligaen | 2 | 0 | 0 | 0 | - | | 2 | 0 |
| Stjørdals-Blink | 2025 | 2. divisjon | 3 | 0 | 0 | 0 | - | | 3 | 0 |
| Junkeren | 2026 | 2. divisjon | 22 | 2 | 1 | 0 | - | | 23 | 2 |
| Career total | | | 58 | 2 | 4 | 1 | - | - | 62 | 3 |
