= Ola Solbakken =

Norwegian footballer (born 1998)

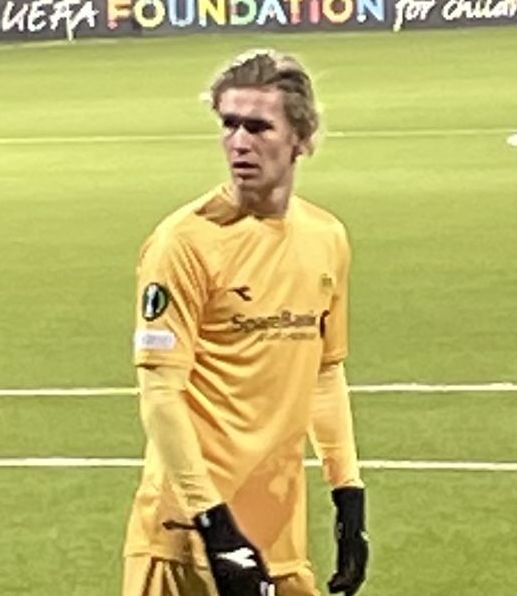
- Solbakken playing for Bodø/Glimt in 2021

Personal information
- Full name: Ola Selvaag Solbakken
- Date of birth: 7 September 1998 (age 28)
- Place of birth: Oslo, Norway
- Height: 1.86 m (6 ft 1 in)
- Position: Winger

Team information
- Current team: Nordsjælland
- Number: 9

Youth career
- 2012: Melhus
- 2013–2017: Rosenborg

Senior career*
Years	Team	Apps	(Gls)
2018–2019	Ranheim	37	(4)
2020–2023	Bodø/Glimt	63	(13)
2023–2025	Roma	15	(1)
2023–2024	→ Olympiacos (loan)	5	(0)
2024	→ Urawa Red Diamonds (loan)	5	(0)
2024–2025	→ Empoli (loan)	21	(0)
2025–	Nordsjælland	18	(6)

International career^{‡}
2015	Norway U17	3	(0)
2021–	Norway	11	(1)
- * Club domestic league appearances and goals as of 20 September 2026 ‡ National team caps and goals as of 12 October 2023

Ola Selvaag Solbakken (born 7 September 1998) is a Norwegian professional footballer who plays as a winger for Danish Superliga club Nordsjælland and the Norway national team.

== Club career ==
=== Bodø/Glimt ===
Solbakken was born in Oslo and raised in Melhus Municipality in Trøndelag, where the family moved when he was three years old.

After starting his career at Ranheim, Solbakken signed a two-year contract with Bodø/Glimt on 18 December 2019, joining the club on 1 January 2020.

=== Roma ===
On 23 November 2022, Serie A club Roma announced to have signed Solbakken as a free agent, agreeing a contract until 30 June 2027. As being under contract with Bodø/Glimt until the end of the year, he joined Roma on 2 January 2023.

On 2 September 2023, Greek Super League club Olympiacos announced to have signed Solbakken on a one year loan from Roma. The Greek club had the option to sign him permanently for €4.5 million.

In January 2024, Solbakken joined J1 League club Urawa Red Diamonds on loan until the end of the season.

On 14 August 2024, Roma loaned Solbakken to fellow Serie A side Empoli ahead of the 2024–25 season.

=== Nordsjælland ===
On 4 August 2025, Danish Superliga club Nordsjælland announced to have signed Solbakken on a four-year contract.

== International career ==
Solbakken made his debut for Norway national team on 13 November 2021 in a World Cup qualifier against Latvia.

== Career statistics ==
=== Club ===
As of match played 20 September 2026

Appearances and goals by club, season and competition
Club	Season	League			National cup (Note: Includes Norwegian Cup)		League cup (Note: Includes J.League Cup)		Continental		Total	
Club	Season	Division	Apps	Goals	Apps	Goals	Apps	Goals	Apps	Goals	Apps	Goals
Ranheim	2018	Eliteserien	11	0	2	0	–		–		13	0
Ranheim	2019	Eliteserien	26	4	4	1	–		–		30	5
Ranheim	Total		37	4	6	1	–		–		43	5
Bodø/Glimt	2020	Eliteserien	22	3	0	0	–		2 (Note: Appearances in UEFA Europa League)	0	24	3
Bodø/Glimt	2021	Eliteserien	26	6	0	0	–		10 (Note: Appearances in UEFA Europa Conference League)	5	35	11
Bodø/Glimt	2022	Eliteserien	15	4	5	0	–		11 (Note: Five appearances and two goals in UEFA Europa Conference League, one appearance in UEFA Champions League, five appearances in UEFA Europa League)	2	31	6
Bodø/Glimt	Total		63	13	5	0	–		23	7	91	20
Roma	2022–23	Serie A	14	1	0	0	–		0	0	14	1
Roma	2023–24	Serie A	1	0	–		–		–		1	0
Roma	Total		15	1	0	0	–		0	0	15	1
Olympiacos (loan)	2023–24	Super League Greece	5	0	0	0	–		3	0	8	0
Urawa Red Diamonds (loan)	2024	J1 League	5	0	–		1	0	–		6	0
Empoli (loan)	2024–25	Serie A	21	0	4	0	–		0	0	25	0
Nordsjælland	2025–26	Danish Superliga	17	6	3	0	–		0	0	20	6
Nordsjælland	2026–27	Danish Superliga	1	0	1	1	–		0	0	2	1
Nordsjælland	Total		18	6	4	1	–		0	0	22	7
Career total			164	24	19	2	1	0	26	7	210	33

=== International ===
As of match played 12 October 2023

Appearances and goals by national team and year
National team	Year	Apps	Goals
Norway	2021	2	0
Norway	2022	2	0
Norway	2023	7	1
Total		11	1

Norway score listed first, score column indicates score after each Solbakken goal.

List of international goals scored by Ola Solbakken
No.	Date	Venue	Cap	Opponent	Score	Result	Competition
1	20 June 2023	Ullevaal Stadion, Oslo, Norway	8	Cyprus	1–0	3–1	UEFA Euro 2024 qualifying

== Honours ==
Bodø/Glimt

- Eliteserien: 2020, 2021
- Norwegian Cup runner-up: 2021–22

Roma

- UEFA Europa League runner-up: 2022–23

Olympiacos

- UEFA Conference League: 2023–24

Individual

- Eliteserien Player of the Month: October 2021
