= Runar Espejord =

Norwegian footballer (born 1996)

Personal information
- Date of birth: 26 February 1996 (age 30)
- Place of birth: Tromsø, Norway
- Height: 1.89 m (6 ft 2 in)
- Position: Forward

Youth career
- –2012: Tromsø

Senior career*
Years	Team	Apps	(Gls)
2013–2019	Tromsø	91	(19)
2020–2022	Heerenveen	6	(0)
2020–2021	→ Tromsø (loan)	22	(5)
2022–2024	Bodø/Glimt	36	(12)
2025	Haugesund	7	(1)

International career
2012	Norway U16	2	(0)
2013	Norway U17	10	(5)
2014	Norway U18	11	(8)
2015	Norway U19	6	(2)
2017–2018	Norway U21	4	(2)
- * Club domestic league appearances and goals as of 5 June 2025

Runar Espejord (born 26 February 1996) is a Norwegian professional footballer who plays as a striker.

== Career ==
=== Tromsø ===
After playing for Tromsø at different youth level's, Espejord started his professional career in 2013 with a game against Follo in the Norwegian Cup. After playing in several of Tromsø's UEFA Europa League games later that season, he scored his first goal in another cup tie against Bodø/Glimt in May 2014.

In 2018, Espejord became the club's top scorer for the season, with eight goals in total, six in the league, and two in the cup.

=== Heerenveen ===
On 20 December 2019, it was announced that Espejord would join Heerenveen for 2.5 years on 1 January 2020.

On 22 September 2020, only half a season after leaving Tromsø, he rejoined Tromsø on loan until 31 December 2020. The deal was later extended twice, to also include all of Tromsø's 2021 season.

=== Bodø/Glimt ===
Before the start of the 2022 season, Espejord signed for the current Eliteserien champions Bodø/Glimt on a three-year contract. Espejord's first match for the club came against Celtic in the UEFA Conference League knockout round play-offs, where he both scored and had an assist.

After several different injuries, keeping Espejord out for major parts of his career at Bodø/Glimt, the club announced that he would be released at the end of the 2024 season.

=== Haugesund ===
In March 2025 Espejord signed a one-year contract with Haugesund.

== Personal life ==
Espejord was born in Tromsø as a son of former Tromsø player Lars Espejord.

Espejord's characteristic mullet have several times caused attention. He cites one of his favorite artists having one as his inspiration for getting the haircut.

== Career statistics ==
As of 5 June 2025

Appearances and goals by club, season and competition
Club	Season	League			National cup (Note: Includes Norwegian Cup, KNVB Cup)		Europe		Total	
Club	Season	Division	Apps	Goals	Apps	Goals	Apps	Goals	Apps	Goals
Tromsø	2013	Eliteserien	0	0	1	0	4 (Note: Appearances in UEFA Europa League)	0	5	0
Tromsø	2014	1. divisjon	14	0	3	1	3	1	20	2
Tromsø	2015	Eliteserien	12	3	1	1	—		13	4
Tromsø	2016	Eliteserien	22	5	2	1	—		24	6
Tromsø	2017	Eliteserien	6	0	0	0	—		6	0
Tromsø	2018	Eliteserien	19	6	2	2	—		21	8
Tromsø	2019	Eliteserien	18	5	0	0	—		18	5
Tromsø	Total		91	19	9	5	7	1	107	25
Heerenveen	2019–20	Eredivisie	6	0	2	0	—		8	0
Heerenveen	2020–21	Eredivisie	0	0	0	0	—		0	0
Heerenveen	Total		6	0	2	0	—		8	0
Tromsø (loan)	2020	1. divisjon	5	5	—		—		5	5
Tromsø (loan)	2021	Eliteserien	17	0	1	0	—		18	0
Tromsø (loan)	Total		22	5	1	0	—		23	5
Bodø/Glimt	2022	Eliteserien	27	12	4	2	19 (Note: Six appearances and one goal in UEFA Europa Conference League, seven appearances and three goals in UEFA Champions League, and seven appearances in UEFA Europa League)	4	50	18
Bodø/Glimt	2023	Eliteserien	8	0	2	2	8 (Note: Appearances in UEFA Europa Conference League)	1	18	3
Bodø/Glimt	2024	Eliteserien	1	0	0	0	3	0	4	0
Bodø/Glimt	Total		36	12	6	4	30	5	72	21
Haugesund	2025	Eliteserien	7	1	0	0	—		7	1
Career total			162	37	18	9	37	6	217	52

== Honours ==
Bodø/Glimt

- Eliteserien: 2023, 2024
