= Hugo Vetlesen =

Norwegian footballer (born 2000)

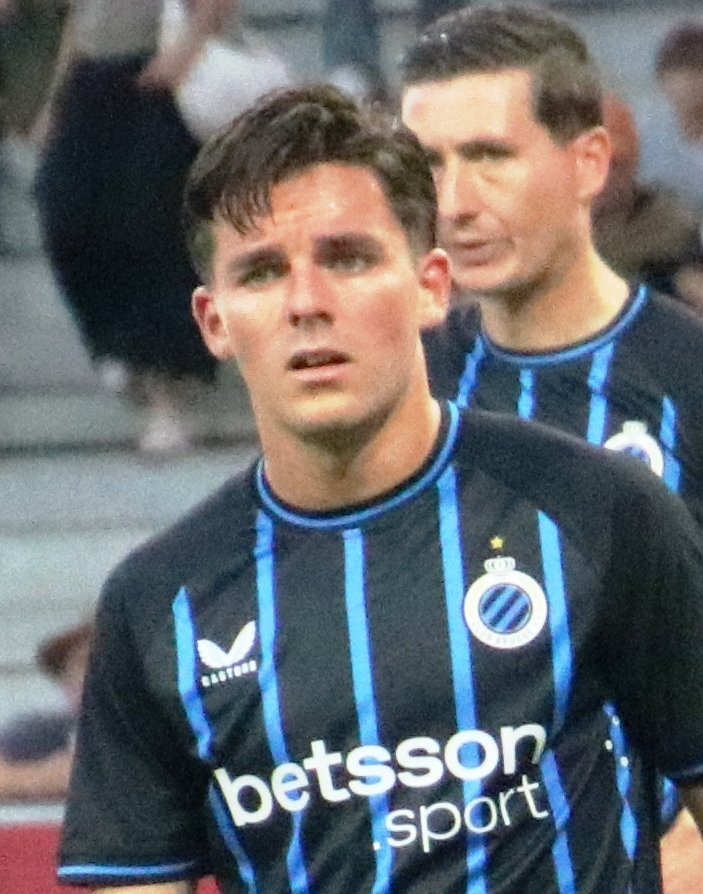
- Vetlesen with Club Brugge in 2025

Personal information
- Full name: Hugo Vegard Vetlesen
- Date of birth: 29 February 2000 (age 26)
- Place of birth: Braine-l'Alleud, Belgium
- Height: 1.74 m (5 ft 9 in)
- Position: Midfielder

Team information
- Current team: Club Brugge
- Number: 10

Senior career*
Years	Team	Apps	(Gls)
2017–2020	Stabæk	93	(5)
2020–2023	Bodø/Glimt	75	(25)
2023–	Club Brugge	101	(15)

International career
2016	Norway U16	3	(0)
2017	Norway U18	9	(1)
2018	Norway U19	7	(1)
2019	Norway U20	4	(0)
2018–2022	Norway U21	9	(0)
2022–2024	Norway	6	(1)
- * Club domestic league appearances and goals as of 8 November 2026

Hugo Vegard Vetlesen (born 29 February 2000) is a professional footballer who plays as a midfielder for Belgian Pro League club Club Brugge. Born in Belgium, he represents the Norway national team.

== Early life ==
Vetlesen was born on 29 February 2000 in Braine-l'Alleud, Wallonia, to a Norwegian father and a French mother. His father, Johan Vetlesen, played in the Norwegian second division and was selected on several occasions for Norway's youth national teams. His mother is from La Rochelle.

== Club career ==
On 5 October 2020, Vetlesen left Stabæk to sign for Bodø/Glimt until the end of 2023. On 7 April 2022, Vetlesen headed in the game-winning goal in a shock 2–1 victory over Serie A side Roma in the quarter-finals of the UEFA Europa Conference League.

On 3 July 2023, Vetlesen signed for Club Brugge until 2027 in a deal worth a reported €7,750,000.

== International career ==
Vetlesen is eligible to play for Belgium through birth along with Norway and France through parentage.

=== 2016–2022: Youth level ===
Vetlesen has represented Norway at U16, U-18, U-19 and, most recently, U-21 level.

With the U-18 team, he scored a goal in a friendly against Finland in November 2017, which ended in a 4–0 victory.

With the U19 team, he scored two goals in March 2018, against the Netherlands in a 1–6 defeat and then against Germany in a 2–5 victory. These two matches were part of the qualifying round for the 2018 UEFA European Under-19 Championship. Vetlesen also provided three assists during those qualifiers. He was subsequently called up to take part in the final phase of the European Championship in that age group, held in Finland. He played four matches in that tournament, recording two wins, one draw and one defeat.

He then went on to represent the Norway under-20 team at the 2019 FIFA U-20 World Cup. At the tournament, held in Poland, he played two matches—against Uruguay and New Zealand—both of which ended in defeat.

With the Norway under-21 team, he received his first call-up from manager Leif Gunnar Smerud on 28 August 2018, ahead of the match against Azerbaijan, which counted towards 2019 UEFA European Under-21 Championship qualification. He made his debut for the Under-21s on 11 September, coming on as a substitute for Dennis Johnsen during the 3–1 victory over Azerbaijan. A year later, on 10 September 2019, he captained the Under-21s for the first time in a friendly against Hungary.

=== 2022–present: Senior level ===
On 8 November 2022, he was called up to the Norway men's team for the first time; the call-up was for the matches against Ireland and Finland. On 20 November 2022, he made his international debut for the Norway against Finland.

On 7 September 2023, he scored his first international goal for Norway against Jordan.

== Career statistics ==
=== Club ===
As of match played 31 October 2026

Appearances and goals by club, season and competition
Club	Season	League			National cup (Note: Includes Norwegian Cup, Belgian Cup)		Continental		Other		Total	
Club	Season	Division	Apps	Goals	Apps	Goals	Apps	Goals	Apps	Goals	Apps	Goals
Stabæk	2017	Eliteserien	26	0	5	0	–		–		31	0
Stabæk	2018	Eliteserien	24	1	3	0	–		1 (Note: Appearance in Eliteserien relegation play-offs)	0	28	1
Stabæk	2019	Eliteserien	24	0	3	1	–		–		26	1
Stabæk	2020	Eliteserien	19	4	–		–		–		19	4
Stabæk	Total		93	5	11	1	0	0	1	0	105	6
Bodø/Glimt	2020	Eliteserien	8	1	–		–		–		8	1
Bodø/Glimt	2021	Eliteserien	27	5	3	0	19 (Note: Two appearances in UEFA Champions League, seventeen appearances and three goals in UEFA Europa Conference League)	3	–		49	8
Bodø/Glimt	2022	Eliteserien	29	16	6	0	15 (Note: Eight appearances and two goals in UEFA Champions League, six appearances and one goal in UEFA Europa League, one appearance in UEFA Europa Conference League)	3	–		50	19
Bodø/Glimt	2023	Eliteserien	11	3	5	1	0	0	–		16	4
Bodø/Glimt	Total		75	25	14	1	34	6	0	0	123	32
Club Brugge	2023–24	Belgian Pro League	37	3	3	2	16 (Note: Appearances in UEFA Europa Conference League)	2	–		56	7
Club Brugge	2024–25	Belgian Pro League	29	2	4	0	7 (Note: Appearances in UEFA Champions League)	0	1 (Note: Appearance in Belgian Super Cup)	0	41	2
Club Brugge	2025–26	Belgian Pro League	24	5	3	1	9	0	1	0	37	6
Club Brugge	2026–27	Belgian Pro League	10	5	0	0	3	1	1	0	14	6
Club Brugge	Total		100	15	10	3	35	3	3	0	148	21
Career total			270	45	35	5	69	9	4	0	378	59

=== International ===
Appearances and goals by national team and year
National team	Year	Apps	Goals
Norway	2022	1	0
Norway	2023	2	1
Norway	2024	3	0
Total		6	1

Scores and results list Norway's goal tally first, score column indicates score after each Vetlesen goal.

List of international goals scored by Hugo Vetlesen
No.	Date	Venue	Opponent	Score	Result	Competition
1	7 September 2023	Ullevaal Stadion, Oslo, Norway	Jordan	6–0	6–0	Friendly

== Honours ==
Bodø/Glimt

- Eliteserien: 2020, 2021, 2023

Club Brugge

- Belgian Pro League: 2023–24, 2025–26
- Belgian Cup: 2024–25
- Belgian Super Cup: 2025

Individual

- Eliteserien Young Player of the Month: November 2021
- Eliteserien Player of the Year: 2022
