= 2018 Stabæk Fotball season =

Stabæk
2018 season
- Chairman: Espen Moe
- Manager: Henning Berg (Antoni Ordinas until July)
- Stadium: Nadderud Stadion
- Eliteserien: 14th
- Norwegian Cup: Third Round vs Mjøndalen
- Top goalscorer: League: Franck Boli (17); All: Franck Boli (17)
Home colours	Away colours

The 2018 season is Stabæk's fifth season back in the Eliteserien following their relegation in 2012, their 22nd season in the top flight of Norwegian football.

The season was marred by several long-term injuries, mostly sustained in pre-season or even the previous season. Moussa Njie missed the first half of the season due to an ankle injury, Luc Kassi due to a thigh injury, and Håkon Skogseid with a hip. Raymond Gyasi broke his leg in late March whereas Steinar Strømnes sustained a head injury in a B-team match.

== Squad ==
As of 16 August 2018

Note: Flags indicate national team as defined under FIFA eligibility rules; some limited exceptions apply. Players may hold more than one non-FIFA nationality.

No.	Pos.	Nation	Player
1	GK	NOR	Simen Kjellevold
2	DF	VEN	Ronald Hernández
4	DF	NOR	Vadim Demidov
5	DF	NOR	Steinar Strømnes
6	DF	NOR	Håkon Skogseid
7	FW	GHA	Raymond Gyasi
8	MF	NOR	John Hou Sæter
9	FW	NOR	Abdul-Basit Agouda
10	FW	CIV	Franck Boli
11	MF	NOR	Moussa Njie
12	GK	SWE	Marcus Sandberg
15	DF	NOR	Morten Renå Olsen
16	DF	NOR	Andreas Hanche-Olsen (Captain)

No.	Pos.	Nation	Player
18	DF	NOR	Jeppe Moe
19	MF	CIV	Aboubakar Keita (on loan from Copenhagen)
20	MF	NOR	Ola Brynhildsen
21	MF	NOR	Daniel Granli
23	MF	NOR	Emil Bohinen
25	MF	NOR	Hugo Vetlesen
28	MF	CIV	Luc Kassi
42	DF	NOR	Tobias Borchgrevink Børkeeiet
50	FW	NOR	Oscar Aga
77	MF	SVN	Filip Valenčič
88	FW	NOR	Herman Geelmuyden
99	FW	NOR	Ohi Omoijuanfo

== Transfers ==
=== Winter ===
In: Note: Flags indicate national team as defined under FIFA eligibility rules; some limited exceptions apply. Players may hold more than one non-FIFA nationality.

No.	Pos.	Nation	Player
1	GK	NOR	Simen Kjellevold (loan return from (Norway) Kongsvinger)
4	DF	NOR	Vadim Demidov (from (United States) Minnesota United)
5	DF	NOR	Steinar Strømnes (from (Norway) Strømmen)
9	FW	NOR	Abdul-Basit Agouda (from (Norway) Strømsgodset)
50	FW	NOR	Oscar Aga (promoted from junior squad)
94	MF	NOR	Martin Rønning Ovenstad (on loan from (Austria) Sturm Graz)
—	DF	NOR	Nicolas Pignatel Jenssen (promoted from junior squad)

Out: Note: Flags indicate national team as defined under FIFA eligibility rules; some limited exceptions apply. Players may hold more than one non-FIFA nationality.

No.	Pos.	Nation	Player
3	DF	NOR	Morten Skjønsberg (retired)
9	FW	NOR	Sindre Mauritz-Hansen (on loan to (Norway) Strømmen)
14	MF	NOR	Marius Østvold (to (Norway) Lyn)}
17	DF	NOR	Ahmed El Amrani (to (Finland) Honka)
20	FW	USA	Rubio Rubin (to (Mexico) Tijuana)
22	GK	SWE	John Alvbåge (loan return to (Sweden) IFK Göteborg)
67	MF	BEL	Tortol Lumanza (to (Turkey) Osmanlispor)
79	FW	NOR	Sebastian Pedersen (to (Norway) Strømsgodset)
—	DF	NOR	Morten Renå Olsen (on loan to (Norway) HamKam)
—	DF	NOR	Edvard Linnebo Race (to (Norway) Raufoss)
—	FW	NOR	Markus Myre Aanesland (to (Norway) Kongsvinger)

=== Summer ===
In: Note: Flags indicate national team as defined under FIFA eligibility rules; some limited exceptions apply. Players may hold more than one non-FIFA nationality.

No.	Pos.	Nation	Player
12	GK	SWE	Marcus Sandberg (from (Norway) Vålerenga)
19	MF	CIV	Aboubakar Keita (on loan from (Denmark) F.C. Copenhagen)
45	DF	NOR	Morten Renå Olsen (loan return from (Norway) HamKam)
77	MF	SVN	Filip Valenčič (from (Finland) HJK)

Out: Note: Flags indicate national team as defined under FIFA eligibility rules; some limited exceptions apply. Players may hold more than one non-FIFA nationality.

No.	Pos.	Nation	Player
30	GK	CIV	Sayouba Mandé (to (Denmark) OB)
89	MF	DEN	Tonny Brochmann (to (Norway) Mjøndalen)
94	MF	NOR	Martin Rønning Ovenstad (loan return to (Austria) Sturm Graz)
97	FW	CHN	Zheng Yiming (released)
98	DF	CHN	Zhou Xin (released)

== Competitions ==
=== Eliteserien ===
==== Results summary ====
Overall								Home						Away					
Pld	W	D	L	GF	GA	GD	Pts	W	D	L	GF	GA	GD	W	D	L	GF	GA	GD
30	6	11	13	37	50	−13	29	5	6	4	23	22	+1	1	5	9	14	28	−14

Last updated: 24 November 2018.
Source: see below

==== Results by round ====
Round	1	2	3	4	5	6	7	8	9	10	11	12	13	14	15	16	17	18	19	20	21	22	23	24	25	26	27	28	29	30
Ground	A	A	A	H	A	H	H	A	H	A	H	A	H	A	H	A	H	A	H	A	H	A	H	A	H	H	A	H	A	H
Result	D	L	D	D	L	D	W	L	L	L	W	L	D	L	W	L	L	D	W	L	D	D	W	L	D	L	D	L	W	D
Position	8	10	14	15	12	15	12	13	14	14	12	14	14	14	14	14	14	14	13	14	14	13	13	14	15	15	15	15	15	14

Updated to match(es) played on 2 September 2018. Source: see below
A = Away; H = Home; W = Win; D = Draw; L = Loss

==== Results ====
11 March 2018 1	Strømsgodset	2–2	Stabæk	Drammen
18:00 CET (UTC+1)	Pedersen 1', 51'	Report	Boli 3' (yellow card) 14'; Omoijuanfo 45'; Vetlesen (yellow card) 50'; Ovenstad (yellow card) 55'; Sæter (yellow card) 76'	Stadium: Marienlyst Stadion; Attendance: 5,199; Referee: Kai Erik Steen

2 April 2018 3	Ranheim	4–1	Stabæk	Trondheim
18:00 CEST (UTC+2)	Løkberg 1', 20'; Rismark (yellow card) 10'; Karlsen (yellow card) 46' (goal) 49', 59' (pen.)	Report	Omoijuanfo 53'; Mandé (yellow card) 59'; Brochmann (yellow card) 73'; Moe (yellow card) 85'	Stadium: EXTRA Arena; Attendance: 2,125; Referee: Tom Harald Hagen

8 April 2018 4	Sandefjord	1–1	Stabæk	Sandefjord
18:00 CEST (UTC+2)	Olsen 34'	Report	Brochmann 26' (yellow card) 71'; Vetlesen (yellow card) 85'	Stadium: Komplett Arena; Attendance: 2,756; Referee: Tore Hansen

15 April 2018 5	Stabæk	1–1	Tromsø	Bærum
18:00 CEST (UTC+2)	Brynhildsen 3'; Demidov (yellow card) 34'	Report	Vuk 11'; Antonsen (yellow card) 39'; Gundersen (yellow card) 77'	Stadium: Nadderud Stadion; Attendance: 3,564; Referee: Rohit Saggi

21 April 2018 6	Brann	3–0	Stabæk	Bergen
18:00 CEST (UTC+2)	Rólantsson 11'; Wormgoor 44'; Larsen 77'	Report	Vetlesen (yellow card) 52'	Stadium: Brann Stadion; Attendance: 9,478; Referee: Svein Oddvar Moen

25 April 2018 2	Stabæk	1–1	Start	Bærum
18:30 CEST (UTC+2)	Omoijuanfo 70'; Moe (yellow card) 87'	Report	Christensen (yellow card) 67'; Sigurðarson 82'; Twum (yellow card) 86'; Kabran (yellow card) 89'; Lowe (yellow card) 90+5'	Stadium: Nadderud Stadion; Attendance: 3,043; Referee: Tommy Skjerven

30 April 2018 7	Stabæk	3–2	Lillestrøm	Bærum
19:00 CEST (UTC+2)	Brynhildsen 40', 58'; Hanche-Olsen (yellow card) 44'; Omoijuanfo 50'; Vetlesen (yellow card) 90+3'	Report	Mathew 22'; Martin 66'	Stadium: Nadderud Stadion; Attendance: 3,210; Referee: Kai Erik Steen

6 May 2018 8	Kristiansund	1–0	Stabæk	Kristiansund
18:00 CEST (UTC+2)	Coly (yellow card) 14'; Bamba 88' (pen.)	Report	Hanche-Olsen (yellow card) 40'; Moe (yellow card) 84'	Stadium: Kristiansund Stadion; Attendance: 3,914; Referee: Trond Ivar Døvle

13 May 2018 9	Stabæk	0–1	Rosenborg	Bærum
20:00 CEST (UTC+2)	Moe (yellow card) 45'	Report	Trondsen 49'	Stadium: Nadderud Stadion; Attendance: 4,561; Referee: Tom Harald Hagen

16 May 2018 10	Vålerenga	1–0	Stabæk	Oslo
18:00 CEST (UTC+2)	Johnson 14'; Nouri (yellow card) 68'; Tollås (yellow card) 90+3'	Report		Stadium: Intility Arena; Attendance: 11,124; Referee: Svein Oddvar Moen

21 May 2018 11	Stabæk	2–1	Odd	Bærum
18:00 CEST (UTC+2)	Børkeeiet (yellow card) 31'; Omoijuanfo 70'; Brochmann 85' (pen.); Moe (yellow card) 90+4'	Report	Broberg (yellow card) 36'; Børven 53'; Rashani (yellow card) 75'; Bergan (yellow card) 84'; Njie (yellow card) 90+3'	Stadium: Nadderud Stadion; Attendance: 3,380; Referee: Dag Vidar Hafsås

28 May 2018 12	Sarpsborg 08	4–2	Stabæk	Sarpsborg
19:00 CEST (UTC+2)	Askar 27' (yellow card) 70'; Schwartz 49'; Zachariassen 78'; Mortensen 81'	Report	Boli 1'; Demidov (yellow card) 43'; Omoijuanfo 61'	Stadium: Sarpsborg Stadion; Attendance: 4,658; Referee: Sigurd Kringstad

10 June 2018 13	Stabæk	0–0	Bodø/Glimt	Bærum
18:00 CEST (UTC+2)	Børkeeiet (yellow card) 43'	Report	Moe (yellow card) 53'	Stadium: Nadderud Stadion; Attendance: 3,510; Referee: Trond Ivar Døvle

23 June 2018 14	Molde	3–0	Stabæk	Molde
18:00 CEST (UTC+2)	Aursnes 10'; Hestad 14'; Moström 89'	Report	Vetlesen (yellow card) 75'	Stadium: Aker Stadion; Attendance: 6,294; Referee: Tommy Skjerven

1 July 2018 15	Stabæk	2–1	Haugesund	Bærum
20:00 CEST (UTC+2)	Boli 35', 62'	Report	Velde 90+2'	Stadium: Nadderud Stadion; Attendance: 3,035; Referee: Rohit Saggi

8 July 2018 16	Start	2–1	Stabæk	Kristiansand
18:00 CEST (UTC+2)	Kabran 60'; Afeez 61'; Käck (yellow card) 77'	Report	Brochmann 49'; Demidov (yellow card) 77'	Stadium: Sør Arena; Attendance: 4,282; Referee: Tom Harald Hagen

5 August 2018 17	Stabæk	1–3	Sarpsborg 08	Bærum
18:00 CEST (UTC+2)	Vetlesen 22'; Børkeeiet (yellow card) 43'	Report	Tamm 2'; Mortensen 9'; Larsen 23'; Thomassen (yellow card) 77'; Halvorsen (yellow card) 80'	Stadium: Nadderud Stadion; Attendance: 3,352; Referee: Rohit Saggi

12 August 2018 18	Rosenborg	1–1	Stabæk	Trondheim
18:00 CEST (UTC+2)	Lundemo 59'	Report	Boli 52'	Stadium: Lerkendal Stadion; Attendance: 14,046; Referee: Tore Hansen

19 August 2018 19	Stabæk	3–1	Molde	Bærum
18:00 CEST (UTC+2)	Demidov 7'; Boli 42', 55'; Keita (yellow card) 58'; Omoijuanfo (yellow card) 66'	Report	E.Hestad 66'	Stadium: Nadderud Stadion; Attendance: 4,501; Referee: Rohit Saggi

26 August 2018 20	Haugesund	2–0	Stabæk	Haugesund
18:00 CEST (UTC+2)	David 32'; Nilsen 39'	Report	Keita (yellow card) 54'	Stadium: Haugesund Stadion; Attendance: 3,822; Referee: Tommy Skjerven

1 September 2018 21	Stabæk	3–3	Sandefjord	Bærum
18:00 CEST (UTC+2)	Njie 17'; Boli 69', 90+8' (penalty missed) 90; Hanche-Olsen (yellow card) 78'	Report	Rufo 31' (yellow card) 44'; Johansen (yellow card) 50'; Fellah 55'; Hansen (yellow card) 66'; Storbæk 79'; Høibråten (yellow card) 84'; Ofkir (yellow card) 86'; Pau Morer (yellow card) 90+6'	Stadium: Nadderud Stadion; Attendance: 3,055; Referee: Kristoffer Hagenes

16 September 2018 22	Tromsø	0–0	Stabæk	Tromsø
18:00 CEST (UTC+2)		Report	Børkeeiet (yellow card) 9'	Stadium: Alfheim Stadion; Attendance: 3,473; Referee: Dag Vidar Hafsås

23 September 2018 23	Stabæk	3–2	Ranheim	Bærum
18:00 CEST (UTC+2)	Boli 38' (pen.), 83'; Keita 87'	Report	Furu (yellow card) 25' (red card) 37'; Foosnæs (yellow card) 29'; Reginiussen 34', 60'; Alseth (yellow card) 75'	Stadium: Nadderud Stadion; Attendance: 3,161; Referee: Tommy Skjerven

30 September 2018 24	Lillestrøm	3–2	Stabæk	Lillestrøm
18:00 CEST (UTC+2)	Pedersen (yellow card) 42'; Olsen 48'; Marić (yellow card) 68'; Haakenstad 81', 83'	Report	Børkeeiet (yellow card) 15'; Boli 69' (pen.), 70'; Vetlesen (yellow card) 72'; Keita (yellow card) 74'	Stadium: Åråsen Stadion; Attendance: 4,642; Referee: Tore Hansen

6 October 2018 25	Stabæk	1–1	Vålerenga	Bærum
15:30 CEST (UTC+2)	Boli 41' (yellow card) 81'; Keita (yellow card) 86'	Report	Johnson 87' (pen.); Dønnum (yellow card) 90+2'	Stadium: Nadderud Stadion; Attendance: 4,021; Referee: Tom Harald Hagen

21 October 2018 26	Stabæk	1–2	Brann	Bærum
20:00 CEST (UTC+2)	Bohinen (yellow card) 27'; Boli (yellow card) 43' (goal) 48'	Report	Haugen (yellow card) 13'; Johansen 52'; Bamba 77'; Jenssen (yellow card) 90+5'	Stadium: Nadderud Stadion; Attendance: 4,031; Referee: Trond Ivar Døvle

28 October 2018 27	Bodø/Glimt	1–1	Stabæk	Bodø
18:00 CET (UTC+1)	Layouni 85'; Zinckernagel (yellow card) 86'	Report	Sæter (yellow card) 42'; Omoijuanfo 58'	Stadium: Aspmyra Stadion; Attendance: 2,887; Referee: Dag Vidar Hafsås

3 November 2018 28	Stabæk	0–1	Kristiansund	Bærum
18:00 CET (UTC+1)		Report	Coly (yellow card) 26' (goal) 80'	Stadium: Nadderud Stadion; Attendance: 3,471; Referee: Svein Oddvar Moen

11 November 2018 29	Odd	0–3	Stabæk	Skien
18:00 CET (UTC+1)	Rossbach (yellow card) 73'; Rashani (yellow card) 84'	Report	Brynhildsen 11'; Boli 72'; Omoijuanfo 78'	Stadium: Skagerak Arena; Attendance: 4,823; Referee: Kai Erik Steen

24 November 2018 30	Stabæk	2–2	Strømsgodset	Bærum
18:00 CET (UTC+1)	Boli 17' (pen.) (yellow card) 86'; Keita 54'	Report	Mos 32', 90+3'	Stadium: Nadderud Stadion; Attendance: 4,938; Referee: Tom Harald Hagen

==== Table ====
Pos	Team	Pld	W	D	L	GF	GA	GD	Pts	Qualification or relegation
12	Lillestrøm	30	7	11	12	34	44	−10	32	
13	Strømsgodset	30	7	10	13	46	48	−2	31	
14	Stabæk (O)	30	6	11	13	37	50	−13	29	Qualification for the relegation play-offs
15	Start (R)	30	8	5	17	30	54	−24	29	Relegation to First Division
16	Sandefjord (R)	30	4	11	15	35	57	−22	23	Relegation to First Division

Source: Football Association of Norway (in Norwegian), Soccerway
Rules for classification: 1) Points; 2) Goal difference; 3) Goals scored; 4) Head-to-head points; 5) Head-to-head goal difference; 6) Head-to-head away goals scored (only if between two teams); 7) Head-to-head goals scored; 8) Play-off (only used to decide champions or relegation).
(O) Play-off winners; (R) Relegated

==== Relegation play-offs ====
5 December 2018 First leg	Stabæk	1–0	Aalesund	Bærum
18:00 CET (UTC+1)	Børkeeiet 27'; Keita (yellow card) 90+1'	Report	Ramsteijn (yellow card) 7'; Guèye (yellow card) 33'; O.Lie (yellow card) 74'	Stadium: Nadderud Stadion; Attendance: 3,831; Referee: Svein Oddvar Moen

9 December 2018 Second leg	Aalesund	1–1 (1–2 agg.)	Stabæk	Ålesund
18:00 CET (UTC+1)	O.Lie 30'; Friðjónsson (yellow card) 36'; Nenass (yellow card) 45'	Report	Boli (yellow card) 20'; Guèye 70' (o.g.); Keita (yellow card) 81'	Stadium: Color Line Stadion; Attendance: 6,333; Referee: Tore Hansen

=== Norwegian Cup ===
18 April 2018 First Round	Ullern	3–5 (a.e.t.)	Stabæk	Oslo
18:00 CEST (UTC+2)	E.Bergstrøm 11', 13' (yellow card) 74'; S.Ahmadi (yellow card) 31'; S.Berge (yellow card) 45'; H.Raddum (yellow card) 78'; T.Rosvoll 112'	Report	Boli 87', 117'; Omoijuanfo 89'; Brynhildsen 96'; Ovenstad 98'	Stadium: Ullernbanen; Attendance: 1,238; Referee: Magnus Koløy

3 May 2018 Second Round	Moss	0–1 (a.e.t.)	Stabæk	Moss
18:00 CEST (UTC+2)		Report	Granli (yellow card) 22'; Børkeeiet (yellow card) 90+1'; Boli 112'	Stadium: Melløs Stadion; Attendance: 415; Referee: Eivind Bodding

9 May 2018 Third round	Mjøndalen	2–0	Stabæk	Mjøndalen
18:00 CEST (UTC+2)	Hellum 49' (yellow card) 71'; Bojang 51'	Report	Brynhildsen (yellow card) 42'; Boli (yellow card) 85'	Stadium: Isachsen Stadion; Attendance: 884; Referee: Christian Moen

== Squad statistics ==
As of match played 9 December 2018

=== Appearances and goals ===
No.	Pos	Nat	Player	Total		Eliteserien		Relegation Playoff		Norwegian Cup	
No.	Pos	Nat	Player	Apps	Goals	Apps	Goals	Apps	Goals	Apps	Goals
1	GK	(Norway) NOR	Simen Kjellevold	3	0	1+1	0	0	0	1	0
2	DF	(Venezuela) VEN	Ronald Hernández	24	0	18+3	0	0	0	3	0
4	DF	(Norway) NOR	Vadim Demidov	28	1	25	1	2	0	0+1	0
5	DF	(Norway) NOR	Steinar Strømnes	7	0	4+1	0	0	0	2	0
8	MF	(Norway) NOR	John Hou Sæter	26	0	19+4	0	0+1	0	1+1	0
9	FW	(Norway) NOR	Abdul-Basit Agouda	2	0	0	0	0	0	2	0
10	FW	(Ivory Coast) CIV	Franck Boli	34	20	29	17	2	0	2+1	3
11	MF	(Norway) NOR	Moussa Njie	17	1	13+2	1	2	0	0	0
12	GK	(Sweden) SWE	Marcus Sandberg	14	0	12	0	2	0	0	0
14	MF	(Norway) NOR	Kristoffer Askildsen	1	0	1	0	0	0	0	0
16	DF	(Norway) NOR	Andreas Hanche-Olsen	28	0	18+5	0	2	0	3	0
18	DF	(Norway) NOR	Jeppe Moe	33	0	29	0	2	0	1+1	0
19	MF	(Ivory Coast) CIV	Aboubakar Keita	12	2	10	2	2	0	0	0
20	MF	(Norway) NOR	Ola Brynhildsen	28	5	13+10	4	2	0	2+1	1
21	MF	(Norway) NOR	Daniel Granli	34	0	28+1	0	2	0	3	0
23	MF	(Norway) NOR	Emil Bohinen	12	0	3+8	0	0	0	1	0
25	MF	(Norway) NOR	Hugo Vetlesen	28	1	20+4	1	0+1	0	3	0
42	DF	(Norway) NOR	Tobias Børkeeiet	32	1	20+7	0	2	1	3	0
50	FW	(Norway) NOR	Oscar Aga	7	0	0+7	0	0	0	0	0
77	MF	(Slovenia) SVN	Filip Valenčič	6	0	1+5	0	0	0	0	0
99	FW	(Norway) NOR	Ohi Omoijuanfo	34	9	29+1	8	2	0	2	1
Players away from Stabæk on loan:
Players who left Stabæk during the season:
30	GK	(Ivory Coast) CIV	Sayouba Mandé	19	0	17	0	0	0	2	0
89	MF	(Denmark) DEN	Tonny Brochmann	19	3	15+1	3	0	0	1+2	0
94	MF	(Norway) NOR	Martin Rønning Ovenstad	10	1	5+3	0	0	0	1+1	1

=== Goal scorers ===
Place	Position	Nation	Number	Name	Eliteserien	Relegation Playoffs	Norwegian Cup	Total
1	FW	(Ivory Coast)	10	Franck Boli	17	0	3	20
2	FW	(Norway)	99	Ohi Omoijuanfo	8	0	1	9
3	MF	(Norway)	20	Ola Brynhildsen	4	0	1	5
4	MF	(Denmark)	89	Tonny Brochmann	3	0	0	3
5	MF	(Ivory Coast)	19	Aboubakar Keita	2	0	0	2
5	MF	(Norway)	94	Martin Rønning Ovenstad	0	1	1	2
7	MF	(Norway)	25	Hugo Vetlesen	1	0	0	1
7	DF	(Norway)	4	Vadim Demidov	1	0	0	1
7	MF	(Norway)	11	Moussa Njie	1	0	0	1
7	DF	(Norway)	42	Tobias Børkeeiet	0	1	0	1
				TOTALS	37	2	6	45

=== Disciplinary record ===
Number	Nation	Position	Name	Eliteserien		Relegation Playoffs		Norwegian Cup		Total	
Number	Nation	Position	Name	Booked	Sent off (straight red)	Booked	Sent off (straight red)	Booked	Sent off (straight red)	Booked	Sent off (straight red)
4	(Norway)	DF	Vadim Demidov	3	0	0	0	0	0	3	0
8	(Norway)	MF	John Hou Sæter	2	0	0	0	0	0	2	0
10	(Ivory Coast)	FW	Franck Boli	4	0	1	0	1	0	6	0
16	(Norway)	DF	Andreas Hanche-Olsen	3	0	0	0	0	0	3	0
18	(Norway)	DF	Jeppe Moe	5	0	0	0	0	0	5	0
19	(Ivory Coast)	MF	Aboubakar Keita	4	0	2	0	0	0	6	0
20	(Norway)	MF	Ola Brynhildsen	0	0	0	0	1	0	1	0
21	(Norway)	MF	Daniel Granli	0	0	0	0	1	0	1	0
23	(Norway)	MF	Emil Bohinen	1	0	0	0	0	0	1	0
25	(Norway)	MF	Hugo Vetlesen	6	0	0	0	0	0	6	0
42	(Norway)	DF	Tobias Børkeeiet	5	0	0	0	1	0	6	0
99	(Norway)	FW	Ohi Omoijuanfo	1	0	0	0	0	0	1	0
Players who left Stabæk during the season:
30	(Ivory Coast)	GK	Sayouba Mandé	1	0	0	0	0	0	1	0
89	(Denmark)	MF	Tonny Brochmann	2	0	0	0	0	0	2	0
94	(Norway)	MF	Martin Rønning Ovenstad	1	0	0	0	0	0	1	0
			TOTALS	34	0	3	0	4	0	41	0
