= 2017 Stabæk Fotball season =

Stabæk
2017 season
- Chairman: Espen Moe
- Manager: Antoni Ordinas
- Stadium: Nadderud Stadion
- Eliteserien: 9th
- Norwegian Cup: Quarterfinal vs Lillestrøm
- Top goalscorer: League: Ohi Omoijuanfo (17); All: Ohi Omoijuanfo (19)
Home colours	Away colours

The 2017 season will be Stabæk's fourth season back in the Eliteserien following their relegation in 2012, their 21st season in the top flight of Norwegian football. Stabæk finished the previous season in fourteenth place and survived the relegation play-offs against FK Jerv.

== Squad ==
As of 17 August 2017

Note: Flags indicate national team as defined under FIFA eligibility rules; some limited exceptions apply. Players may hold more than one non-FIFA nationality.

No.	Pos.	Nation	Player
1	GK	CIV	Sayouba Mande
2	DF	VEN	Ronald Hernández
3	DF	NOR	Morten Skjønsberg
4	DF	NOR	Tobias Ødegård
6	DF	NOR	Håkon Skogseid
7	FW	GHA	Raymond Gyasi
8	MF	NOR	John Hou Sæter
9	FW	NOR	Sindre Mauritz-Hansen
10	FW	CIV	Franck Boli
11	MF	NOR	Moussa Njie
14	MF	NOR	Marius Østvold
16	DF	NOR	Andreas Hanche-Olsen
17	DF	NOR	Ahmed El Amrani
18	DF	NOR	Jeppe Moe

No.	Pos.	Nation	Player
20	FW	USA	Rubio Rubin
21	MF	NOR	Daniel Granli
22	GK	SWE	John Alvbåge
23	MF	NOR	Emil Bohinen
25	MF	NOR	Hugo Vetlesen
28	MF	CIV	Luc Kassi
40	DF	NOR	Tobias Børkeeiet
60	DF	NOR	Edvard Linnebo Race
67	MF	BEL	Tortol Lumanza
77	MF	CHN	Tao Hongliang
79	FW	NOR	Sebastian Pedersen
89	MF	DEN	Tonny Brochmann
99	FW	NOR	Ohi Omoijuanfo

=== Out on loan ===
Note: Flags indicate national team as defined under FIFA eligibility rules; some limited exceptions apply. Players may hold more than one non-FIFA nationality.

No.	Pos.	Nation	Player
—	DF	NOR	Emil Ekblom (on loan at KFUM Oslo)
—	MF	NOR	Edvard Race (on loan at Kongsvinger)

== Transfers ==
=== Winter ===
In: Note: Flags indicate national team as defined under FIFA eligibility rules; some limited exceptions apply. Players may hold more than one non-FIFA nationality.

No.	Pos.	Nation	Player
4	MF	NOR	Tobias Ødegård (from (Norway) HamKam)
6	DF	NOR	Håkon Skogseid (from (Norway) Lillestrøm)
7	MF	GHA	Raymond Gyasi (from (Netherlands) SC Cambuur)
8	MF	FRA	El Hadji Ba (from (England) Charlton Athletic)
9	FW	NOR	Sindre Mauritz-Hansen (from (Norway) Asker)
17	DF	NOR	Ahmed El Amrani (from (Sweden) Ljungskile)
20	FW	ENG	Alex Nimely (from (Romania) Viitorul Constanța)
67	MF	BEL	Tortol Lumanza (from (Belgium) Waasland-Beveren)
77	FW	CIV	Franck Boli (from (China) Liaoning Whowin, previously on loan at (Norway) Aalesund)
89	MF	DEN	Tonny Brochmann (from (Norway) Jerv)

Out: Note: Flags indicate national team as defined under FIFA eligibility rules; some limited exceptions apply. Players may hold more than one non-FIFA nationality.

No.	Pos.	Nation	Player
4	DF	SWE	Marcus Nilsson (to (South Korea) Pohang Steelers)
7	FW	CRC	Mynor Escoe (loan return to (Costa Rica) Saprissa)
8	MF	USA	Cole Grossman
9	FW	GEO	Giorgi Gorozia (to (Azerbaijan) Zira)
10	FW	ALB	Agon Mehmeti (to (Turkey) Gençlerbirliği)
25	DF	NOR	Birger Meling (to (Norway) Rosenborg)
32	MF	BRA	Alanzinho
77	FW	NOR	Muhamed Keita (loan return to (Poland) Lech Poznan)
—	GK	NOR	Simen Lillevik (on loan to (Norway) Kongsvinger)

=== Summer ===
In: Note: Flags indicate national team as defined under FIFA eligibility rules; some limited exceptions apply. Players may hold more than one non-FIFA nationality.

No.	Pos.	Nation	Player
2	DF	VEN	Ronald Hernández (from (Venezuela) Zamora)
8	MF	NOR	John Hou Sæter (from (Norway) Rosenborg)
20	FW	USA	Rubio Rubin (from (Denmark) Silkeborg)
22	GK	SWE	John Alvbåge (on loan from (Sweden) IFK Göteborg)
60	DF	NOR	Edvard Linnebo Race (loan return from (Norway) Kongsvinger)
77	MF	CHN	Tao Hongliang (from (China) Shandong Luneng Taishan F.C.)

Out: Note: Flags indicate national team as defined under FIFA eligibility rules; some limited exceptions apply. Players may hold more than one non-FIFA nationality.

No.	Pos.	Nation	Player
8	MF	FRA	El Hadji Ba (to (France) Sochaux)
20	FW	LBR	Alex Nimely (released)
22	GK	IND	Gurpreet Singh Sandhu (to (India) Bengaluru FC)
50	FW	NOR	Oskar Johannes Løken (to (Norway) Raufoss)

== Competitions ==
=== Eliteserien ===
==== Results summary ====
Overall								Home						Away					
Pld	W	D	L	GF	GA	GD	Pts	W	D	L	GF	GA	GD	W	D	L	GF	GA	GD
30	10	9	11	46	50	−4	39	6	3	6	24	25	−1	4	6	5	22	25	−3

Last updated: 26 November 2017.
Source: see below

==== Results by round ====
Round	1	2	3	4	5	6	7	8	9	10	11	12	13	14	15	16	17	18	19	20	21	22	23	24	25	26	27	28	29	30
Ground	H	A	H	H	H	H	A	H	A	H	A	H	A	H	A	H	A	H	A	H	A	H	A	H	A	H	A	A	H	A
Result	W	L	W	W	W	L	D	D	W	D	L	L	L	L	W	W	D	L	D	W	D	D	L	W	D	L	D	W	D	L
Position	3	10	5	3	3	3	3	5	5	4	5	6	9	10	9	5	6	7	7	6	7	8	9	9	8	9	9	8	7	9

Updated to match(es) played on 26 November 2017. Source: see below
A = Away; H = Home; W = Win; D = Draw; L = Loss

==== Results ====
2 April 2017 1	Stabæk	3–1	Aalesund	Bærum
18:00 CEST (UTC+2)	Ba (yellow card) 7'; Omoijuanfo 14', 20', 50' (yellow card) 14'	Report	Ramsteijn (yellow card) 59'; Abdellaoue 65'	Stadium: Nadderud Stadion; Attendance: 4,049; Referee: Kai Erik Steen

5 April 2017 2	Sogndal	4–1	Stabæk	Sogndalsfjøra
19:00 CEST (UTC+2)	Mandé 19' (o.g.); Birkelund (yellow card) 39'; Bye 46', 55'; Koomson 74' (pen.)	Report	Hanche-Olsen (yellow card) 49'; Nimely 70'; Njie (yellow card) 90'	Stadium: Fosshaugane Campus; Attendance: 2,237; Referee: Rohit Saggi

9 April 2017 3	Stabæk	2–0	Odd	Bærum
18:00 CEST (UTC+2)	Brochmann 74'; Granli (yellow card) 90+3'; Kassi 90+4'	Report		Stadium: Nadderud Stadion; Attendance: 3,721; Referee: Trond Ivar Døvle

17 April 2017 4	Stabæk	3–0	Sarpsborg 08	Bærum
18:00 CEST (UTC+2)	Omoijuanfo 32' (pen.), 73', 87'	Report	Rosted (red card) 31'; Thomassen (yellow card) 43'; Halvorsen (yellow card) 45'	Stadium: Nadderud Stadion; Attendance: 3,870; Referee: Tore Hansen

23 April 2017 5	Tromsø	0–3	Stabæk	Tromsø
18:00 CEST (UTC+2)	Jenssen (yellow card) 88'; Andersen (yellow card) 90+3'	Report	Omoijuanfo 5'; Vetlesen (yellow card) 33'; Brochmann 39', 42'; Hanche-Olsen (yellow card) 85'	Stadium: Alfheim Stadion; Attendance: 3,447; Referee: Rohit Saggi

30 April 2017 6	Stabæk	0–3	Haugesund	Bærum
18:00 CEST (UTC+2)	Kassi (yellow card) 69'; Lumanza (yellow card) 85'	Report	Kiss 43'; Huseklepp 53'; Hajradinović 83'	Stadium: Nadderud Stadion; Attendance: 4,001; Referee: Dag Vidar Hafsås

7 May 2017 7	Vålerenga	1–1	Stabæk	Oslo
18:00 CEST (UTC+2)	Finne (yellow card) 33'; Tollås (yellow card) 57'; Zahid 89' (pen.) (yellow card) 90+2'	Report	Brochmann 45+1'; Moe (yellow card) 61'; Vetlesen (yellow card) 63'; Mande (yellow card) 88'; Nimely (yellow card) 90+3'	Stadium: Ullevaal Stadion; Attendance: 6,968; Referee: Kai Erik Steen

13 May 2017 8	Stabæk	0–0	Rosenborg	Bærum
16:00 CEST (UTC+2)	Moe (yellow card) 43'; Njie 81'	Report	Bakenga (yellow card) 37'	Stadium: Nadderud Stadion; Attendance: 4,938; Referee: Tom Harald Hagen

16 May 2017 9	Strømsgodset	1–2	Stabæk	Drammen
20:00 CEST (UTC+2)	Andersen 41'; Júnior (yellow card) 74'	Report	Brochmann 35'; Omoijuanfo 79'	Stadium: Marienlyst Stadion; Attendance: 6,565; Referee: Dag Vidar Hafsås

22 May 2017 10	Stabæk	1–1	Viking	Bærum
19:00 CEST (UTC+2)	Gyasi (yellow card) 84'; Omoijuanfo 90+5'	Report	Appiah 41'; Sale (yellow card) 58'; Ernemann (yellow card) 81'	Stadium: Nadderud Stadion; Attendance: 3,644; Referee: Tore Hansen

28 May 2017 11	Molde	3–1	Stabæk	Molde
18:00 CEST (UTC+2)	Toivio 4'; Hestad (yellow card) 10'; Aursnes (yellow card) 32' (yellow-red card) 61'; Brustad 37'; Svendsen (yellow card) 48'; Sarr (yellow card) 81'; Sigurðarson 90+2'	Report	Kassi (yellow card) 28' (goal) 58'; Lumanza (yellow card) 90'	Stadium: Aker Stadion; Attendance: 7,281; Referee: Kristoffer Hagenes

3 June 2017 12	Stabæk	2–4	Lillestrøm	Bærum
18:00 CEST (UTC+2)	Kassi (yellow card) 41'; Skogseid 45+1'; Brochmann 46'; Ba (yellow card) 50'	Report	Knudtzon 12', 56'; Kippe 70'; Rafn 85'	Stadium: Nadderud Stadion; Attendance: 3,604; Referee: Dag Vidar Hafsås

19 June 2017 13	Brann	5–0	Stabæk	Bergen
19:00 CEST (UTC+2)	Braaten 20'; Nouri 39'; Acosta 41'; Ba 64' (o.g.); Vega 87'	Report	Moe (yellow card) 48'	Stadium: Brann Stadion; Attendance: 10,531; Referee: Svein Odvar Moen

25 June 2017 14	Stabæk	1–4	Kristiansund	Bærum
18:00 CEST (UTC+2)	Nimely 55'; Olsen (red card) 88'	Report	Mendy 14'; Stokke 63', 67', 79'	Stadium: Nadderud Stadion; Attendance: 3,835; Referee: Dag Vidar Hafsås

2 July 2017 15	Sandefjord	1–2	Stabæk	Sandefjord
18:00 CEST (UTC+2)	Kastrati 84' (pen.)	Report	Ba (yellow card) 10'; Gyasi (yellow card) 47'; Kassi 50'; Omoijuanfo 63'; Brochmann (yellow card) 71'	Stadium: Komplett Arena; Attendance: 3,882; Referee: Rohit Saggi

9 July 2017 16	Stabæk	2–0	Brann	Bærum
20:00 CEST (UTC+2)	Hanche-Olsen 2'; Omoijuanfo 60'	Report		Stadium: Nadderud Stadion; Attendance: 4,205; Referee: Tore Hansen

15 July 2017 17	Lillestrøm	2–2	Stabæk	Lillestrøm
18:00 CEST (UTC+2)	Knudtzon (yellow card) 61'; Mikalsen 81'; Brenden 88'	Report	Moe (yellow card) 19'; Brochmann 36'; Vetlesen (yellow card) 38'; Omoijuanfo 40'; Skjønsberg (yellow card) 51'	Stadium: Åråsen Stadion; Attendance: 4,280; Referee: Tom Harald Hagen

6 August 2017 18	Stabæk	1–3	Sandefjord	Bærum
18:00 CEST (UTC+2)	Sæter (yellow card) 45+1'; Skogseid 83'	Report	Kastrati 16' van Berkel (yellow card) 68'; Solberg 74'; Rodriguez 90+3'	Stadium: Nadderud Stadion; Attendance: 3,310; Referee: Dag Vidar Hafsås

13 August 2017 19	Haugesund	2–2	Stabæk	Haugesund
18:00 CEST (UTC+2)	Abdi 9'; Andreassen 40'	Report	Kassi (yellow card) 32'; Omoijuanfo 64' (yellow card) 88'; Gyasi 66'; Vetlesen (yellow card) 83'	Stadium: Haugesund Stadion; Attendance: 3,827; Referee: Tore Hansen

20 August 2017 20	Stabæk	3–2	Molde	Bærum
18:00 CEST (UTC+2)	Sæter 16'; Kassi 57'; Omoijuanfo 74' (pen.)	Report	Forren (yellow card) 29'; Sigurðarson 61'; Brustad 88'	Stadium: Nadderud Stadion; Attendance: 4,728; Referee: Tom Harald Hagen

10 September 2017 21	Aalesund	1–1	Stabæk	Ålesund
18:00 CEST (UTC+2)	Abdellaoue 79' (pen.)	Report	Omoijuanfo 37' (yellow card) 78'; Lumanza (yellow card) 70'	Stadium: Color Line Stadion; Attendance: 5,228; Referee: Rohit Saggi

16 September 2017 22	Stabæk	0–2	Strømsgodset	Bærum
CEST (UTC+2)	A.El Amrani (yellow card) 81'	Report	Pedersen 21'; Hauger (yellow card) 45'; Andersen 52'	Stadium: Nadderud Stadion; Attendance: 3,677; Referee: Kristoffer Hagenes

24 September 2017 23	Kristiansund	1–0	Stabæk	Kristiansund
18:00 CEST (UTC+2)	Gjertsen 13'; Hopmark (yellow card) 22'	Report	Hernández (yellow card) 41'; Brochmann (yellow card) 83'	Stadium: Atlanten Stadion; Attendance: 3,874; Referee: Sigurd Smehus Kringstad

30 September 2017 24	Stabæk	4–2	Vålerenga	Bærum
18:00 CEST (UTC+2)	Omoijuanfo 57', 76' (yellow card) 73'; Lumanza 60'; Hernández (yellow card) 65'; Boli 82'	Report	Grindheim 37', 45'; Lundström (yellow card) 59'; Berntsen (yellow card) 68'	Stadium: Nadderud Stadion; Attendance: 4,043; Referee: Tore Hansen

16 October 2017 25	Sarpsborg 08	2–2	Stabæk	Sarpsborg
19:00 CEST (UTC+2)	Heintz 1'; Zachariassen 12'; Østli (yellow card) 34'; Nielsen (yellow card) 66'; Thomassen (yellow card) 82'; Hansen (yellow card) 90'	Report	Hernández (yellow card) 24'; Njie 27'; Skjønsberg 87'	Stadium: Sarpsborg Stadion; Attendance: 4,455; Referee: Kai Erik Steen

22 October 2017 26	Stabæk	1–2	Tromsø	Bærum
18:00 CEST (UTC+2)	Boli 48'; Hanche-Olsen (yellow card) 51' (yellow-red card) 79'	Report	Gundersen 23'; Bakenga 34'; Landu (yellow card) 63'; Nilsen (yellow card) 65'	Stadium: Nadderud Stadion; Attendance: 3,403; Referee: Svein Oddvar Moen

29 October 2017 27	Rosenborg	0–0	Stabæk	Trondheim
18:00 CET (UTC+1)	Hedenstad (yellow card) 57'	Report	Skogseid (yellow card) 50'	Stadium: Lerkendal Stadion; Attendance: 20,723; Referee: Kristoffer Hagenes

5 November 2017 28	Odd	0–5	Stabæk	Skien
18:00 CET (UTC+1)	Rashani (yellow card) 34'	Report	Lumanza 18'; Boli 20', 23'; Vetlesen (yellow card) 28'; Brochmann 38'; Brynhildsen 83'	Stadium: Skagerak Arena; Attendance: 6,315; Referee: Dag Vidar Hafsås

19 November 2017 29	Stabæk	1–1	Sogndal	Bærum
18:00 CET (UTC+1)	Brynhildsen 30'	Report	Birkelund (yellow card) 25'; Dyngeland (yellow card) 35'; Soltvedt 56'; Mandić (yellow card) 83'	Stadium: Nadderud Stadion; Attendance: 4,373; Referee: Tom Harald Hagen

26 November 2017 30	Viking	2–0	Stabæk	Stavanger
18:00 CET (UTC+1)	Sale (yellow card) 9'; Bringaker 25', 51'; Jenkins (yellow card) 27'; Gregov (yellow card) 90+2'	Report	Moe (yellow card) 57'; Tao (yellow card) 84'	Stadium: Viking Stadion; Attendance: 6,157; Referee: Tommy Skjerven

==== Table ====
Pos	Team	Pld	W	D	L	GF	GA	GD	Pts
7	Kristiansund	30	10	10	10	44	46	−2	40
8	Vålerenga	30	11	6	13	48	46	+2	39
9	Stabæk	30	10	9	11	46	50	−4	39
10	Haugesund	30	11	6	13	35	39	−4	39
11	Tromsø	30	10	8	12	42	49	−7	38

Source: Football Association of Norway (in Norwegian), Soccerway
Rules for classification: 1) Points; 2) Goal difference; 3) Goals scored; 4) Head-to-head points; 5) Head-to-head goal difference; 6) Head-to-head away goals scored (only if between two teams); 7) Head-to-head goals scored; 8) Play-off (only used to decide champions or relegation).

=== Norwegian Cup ===
26 April 2017 First Round	Holmlia	0–9	Stabæk	Oslo
18:00 CEST (UTC+2)	N.Hussein (yellow card) 72'; D.Hajo (yellow card) 78'	Report	Mauritz-Hansen 23', 44', 90'; Omoijuanfo 36', 52'; Njie 47'; El Amrani 48', 73'; Nimely 75'	Stadium: Lusetjern kunstgress Attendance: 500; Referee: Bjørn Hansen

25 May 2017 Second Round	Asker	0–5	Stabæk	Asker
18:00 CEST (UTC+2)		Report	Mauritz-Hansen 49', 72', 73'; Kassi 54'; Nimely (yellow card) 69' (goal) 90'; Lumanza (yellow card) 83'	Stadium: Føyka Stadion; Attendance: 1,440; Referee: Torkel Jonsson Traedal

31 May 2017 Third Round	Asker	1–4 (a.e.t.)	Stabæk	Notodden
18:00 CEST (UTC+2)	Hustad 25'; Hoseth (yellow card) 31'; J.Pérez (yellow card) 42'; F.Almström-Tähti (red card) 81'	Report	Njie 27'; Ba (yellow card) 104' (goal) 107'; Hanche-Olsen (yellow card) 116'; Brynhildsen (yellow card) 111'; Nimely 112'; Kassi 116'	Stadium: Notodden Stadion; Attendance: 986; Referee: Per Erik Haugen

10 August 2017 Fourth Round	Stabæk	3–0	Aalesund	Bærum
18:00 CEST (UTC+2)	Gyasi 20'; Lumanza 41'; Brochmann 47'	Report	Ramsteijn (yellow card) 63'	Stadium: Nadderud Stadion; Attendance: 1,820; Referee: Trond Ivar Døvle

26 August 2017 Quarterfinal	Lillestrøm	3–1	Stabæk	Lillestrøm
18:30 CEST (UTC+2)	Andreassen 21'; Tagbajumi 56'; Brenden (yellow card) 90+1'; Krogstad 90+2'	Report	Sæter 29'; Hanche-Olsen (yellow card) 39' (yellow-red card) 57'	Stadium: Åråsen Stadion; Attendance: 2,937; Referee: Kai Steen

== Squad statistics ==
As of match played 26 November 2017

=== Appearances and goals ===
No.	Pos	Nat	Player	Total		Eliteserien		Norwegian Cup	
No.	Pos	Nat	Player	Apps	Goals	Apps	Goals	Apps	Goals
1	GK	(Ivory Coast) CIV	Sayouba Mandé	24	0	21	0	3	0
2	DF	(Venezuela) VEN	Ronald Hernández	9	0	9	0	0	0
3	DF	(Norway) NOR	Morten Skjønsberg	32	1	30	1	2	0
6	DF	(Norway) NOR	Håkon Skogseid	27	2	23	2	4	0
7	FW	(Ghana) GHA	Raymond Gyasi	20	2	11+6	1	3	1
8	MF	(Norway) NOR	John Hou Sæter	11	2	6+3	1	1+1	1
9	FW	(Norway) NOR	Sindre Mauritz-Hansen	7	6	0+4	0	3	6
10	FW	(Ivory Coast) CIV	Franck Boli	11	4	7+3	4	0+1	0
11	MF	(Norway) NOR	Moussa Njie	25	3	19+3	1	2+1	2
16	DF	(Norway) NOR	Andreas Hanche-Olsen	33	1	28	1	5	0
17	DF	(Norway) NOR	Ahmed El Amrani	10	0	1+7	0	0+2	0
18	DF	(Norway) NOR	Jeppe Moe	28	0	26	0	1+1	0
20	FW	(United States) USA	Rubio Rubin	8	0	0+7	0	0+1	0
21	MF	(Norway) NOR	Daniel Granli	19	0	5+9	0	5	0
22	GK	(Sweden) SWE	John Alvbåge	8	0	7+1	0	0	0
23	MF	(Norway) NOR	Emil Bohinen	6	0	0+3	0	0+3	0
25	MF	(Norway) NOR	Hugo Vetlesen	31	0	23+3	0	5	0
28	MF	(Ivory Coast) CIV	Luc Kassi	26	6	17+4	4	4+1	2
30	MF	(Norway) NOR	Ola Brynhildsen	7	2	2+3	2	0+2	0
45	FW	(Norway) NOR	Morten Rena Olsen	5	0	0+2	0	3	0
67	MF	(Belgium) BEL	Tortol Lumanza	32	3	27+1	2	3+1	1
77	MF	(China) CHN	Tao Hongliang	1	0	0+1	0	0	0
79	FW	(Norway) NOR	Sebastian Pedersen	2	0	0+2	0	0	0
89	MF	(Denmark) DEN	Tonny Brochmann	31	9	29+1	8	1	1
99	FW	(Norway) NOR	Ohi Omoijuanfo	31	19	26+1	17	4	2
	FW	(Norway) NOR	Sebastian Pedersen	1	0	0	0	0+1	0
Players away from Stabæk on loan:
Players who left Stabæk during the season:
8	MF	(France) FRA	El Hadji Ba	12	1	10+1	0	1	1
20	FW	(England) ENG	Alex Nimely	16	4	1+12	2	3	2
22	GK	(India) IND	Gurpreet Singh Sandhu	4	0	2	0	2	0

=== Goal scorers ===
Place	Position	Nation	Number	Name	Eliteserien	Norwegian Cup	Total
1	FW	(Norway)	99	Ohi Omoijuanfo	17	2	19
2	MF	(Denmark)	89	Tonny Brochmann	8	1	9
3	MF	(Ivory Coast)	28	Luc Kassi	4	2	6
3	FW	(Norway)	9	Sindre Mauritz-Hansen	0	6	6
5	FW	(England)	20	Alex Nimely	2	3	5
6	FW	(Ivory Coast)	10	Franck Boli	4	0	4
7	MF	(Belgium)	67	Tortol Lumanza	2	1	3
7	MF	(Norway)	11	Moussa Njie	1	2	3
9	DF	(Norway)	6	Håkon Skogseid	2	0	2
9	MF	(Norway)	30	Ola Brynhildsen	2	0	2
9	FW	(Ghana)	7	Raymond Gyasi	1	1	2
9	MF	(Norway)	8	John Hou Sæter	1	1	2
9	DF	(Norway)	17	Ahmed El Amrani	0	2	2
14	DF	(Norway)	16	Andreas Hanche-Olsen	1	0	1
14	DF	(Norway)	3	Morten Skjønsberg	1	0	1
14	MF	(France)	8	El Hadji Ba	0	1	1
				TOTALS	41	22	63

=== Disciplinary record ===
Number	Nation	Position	Name	Eliteserien		Norwegian Cup		Total	
Number	Nation	Position	Name	Yellow card	Red card	Yellow card	Red card	Yellow card	Red card
1	(Ivory Coast)	GK	Sayouba Mandé	1	0	0	0	1	0
2	(Venezuela)	DF	Ronald Hernández	3	0	0	0	3	0
3	(Norway)	DF	Morten Skjønsberg	1	0	0	0	1	0
6	(Norway)	DF	Håkon Skogseid	1	0	0	0	1	0
7	(Ghana)	FW	Raymond Gyasi	2	0	0	0	2	0
8	(France)	MF	El Hadji Ba	3	0	1	0	4	0
8	(Norway)	MF	John Hou Sæter	1	0	0	0	1	0
11	(Norway)	MF	Moussa Njie	2	0	0	0	2	0
16	(Norway)	DF	Andreas Hanche-Olsen	4	1	3	1	7	2
17	(Norway)	DF	Ahmed El Amrani	1	0	0	0	1	0
18	(Norway)	DF	Jeppe Moe	5	0	0	0	5	0
20	(England)	FW	Alex Nimely	1	0	1	0	2	0
21	(Norway)	MF	Daniel Granli	1	0	0	0	1	0
25	(Norway)	MF	Hugo Vetlesen	5	0	0	0	5	0
28	(Ivory Coast)	MF	Luc Kassi	4	0	0	0	4	0
30	(Norway)	MF	Ola Brynhildsen	0	0	1	0	1	0
45	(Norway)	FW	Morten Rena Olsen	0	1	0	0	0	1
67	(Belgium)	MF	Tortol Lumanza	3	0	1	0	4	0
77	(China)	MF	Tao Hongliang	1	0	0	0	1	0
89	(Denmark)	MF	Tonny Brochmann	2	0	0	0	2	0
99	(Norway)	FW	Ohi Omoijuanfo	4	0	0	0	4	0
			TOTALS	46	2	7	1	53	3
