= 2016 Eliteserien promotion/relegation play-offs =

Norwegian football play-off

The 2016 Eliteserien promotion/relegation play-offs was the 43rd time a spot in the Eliteserien are decided by play-off matches between top tier and second level clubs.

At the end of the 2016 season, Bodø/Glimt and Start were relegated directly to 2017 OBOS-ligaen, and was replaced by Kristiansund and Sandefjord who were directly promoted.

== Background ==
The play-offs between Eliteserien and OBOS-ligaen have been held every year since 1972 with exceptions in 1994 and 2011. They take place for the two divisions following the conclusion of the regular season and are contested by the fourteenth-placed club in Eliteserien and the four clubs finishing below the automatic promotion places in OBOS-ligaen. The fixtures are determined by final league position – the first to knockout-rounds begins with the four teams in the OBOS-ligaen: 3rd v 6th and 4th v 5th, and the winner then play each other to determine who meet the Eliteserien club in the final.

== Qualified teams ==
Five teams entered a play-off for the last Eliteserien spot for the 2017 season. These were:

- Stabæk (14th placed team in the Tippeligaen)
- Jerv (third placed team in the OBOS-ligaen)
- Sandnes Ulf (fourth placed team in the OBOS-ligaen)
- Kongsvinger (fifth placed team in the OBOS-ligaen)
- Mjøndalen (sixth placed team in the OBOS-ligaen)

The four OBOS-ligaen teams first played a single game knockout tournament, with the winner (Jerv) advancing to a two-legged tie against the Eliteserien team (Stabæk) for the 16th and final spot in the 2017 Eliteserien season. Stabæk maintained their position in the top flight with a 2–1 win on aggregate against Jerv.

=== Matches ===
The third to sixth-placed teams in 2016 OBOS-ligaen took part in the promotion play-offs; these were single leg knockout matches, two semi-finals and a final. The winners of the second round, Jerv, advanced to play the 14th placed team in Eliteserien over two legs in the Eliteserien play-offs for a spot in the top-flight next season.

==== First round ====
5 November 2016
18:00 CET (UTC+1)

Sandnes Ulf	0–2	Kongsvinger
	Report	Güven 9', 90+3'

Sandnes Idrettspark, Sandnes
Attendance: 1,262
Referee: Rohit Saggi
19 November 2016
12:00 CET (UTC+1)

Jerv	2–1	Mjøndalen
Haugstad 9'; Brochmann 60'	Report	Sylling Olsen 57'

Levermyr Stadion, Grimstad
Attendance: 1,100
Referee: Kristoffer Hagenes
1. The match began originally on 5 November 2016, but was suspended in the 45th minute at 1–0 to Jerv, due to heavy rain; remaining minutes were played on 19 November 2016.

==== Second round ====
26 November 2016
12:00 CET (UTC+1)

Jerv	2–1	Kongsvinger
Andersen 32'; Brochmann 38'	Report	Maikel 16'

Levermyr Stadion, Grimstad
Attendance: 1,370
Referee: Trygve Kjensli

==== Final ====
The 14th-placed team, Stabæk, took part in a two-legged play-off against Jerv, the winners of the 2016 First Division promotion play-offs, to decide who would play in the 2017 Eliteserien.

30 November 2016
12:00 CET (UTC+1)

Jerv	1–0	Stabæk
Ogungbaro 76'	Report

Levermyr Stadion, Grimstad
Attendance: 1,750
Referee: Dag Roger Nebben
4 December 2016
18:00 CET (UTC+1)

Stabæk	2–0	Jerv
Omoijuanfo 83', 85'	Report

Nadderud Stadion, Bærum
Attendance: 4,528
Referee: Svein Oddvar Moen

Stabæk won 2–1 on aggregate and retained their place in the 2017 Eliteserien; Jerv remained in the First Division.

== Bracket ==
First round
3	Jerv	2
6	Mjøndalen	1
4	Sandnes Ulf	0
5	Kongsvinger	2

Second round
3	Jerv	2
5	Kongsvinger	1

Final round
3	Jerv	1
14	Stabæk	0
