= El Hadji Ba =

Mauritanian footballer (born 1993)

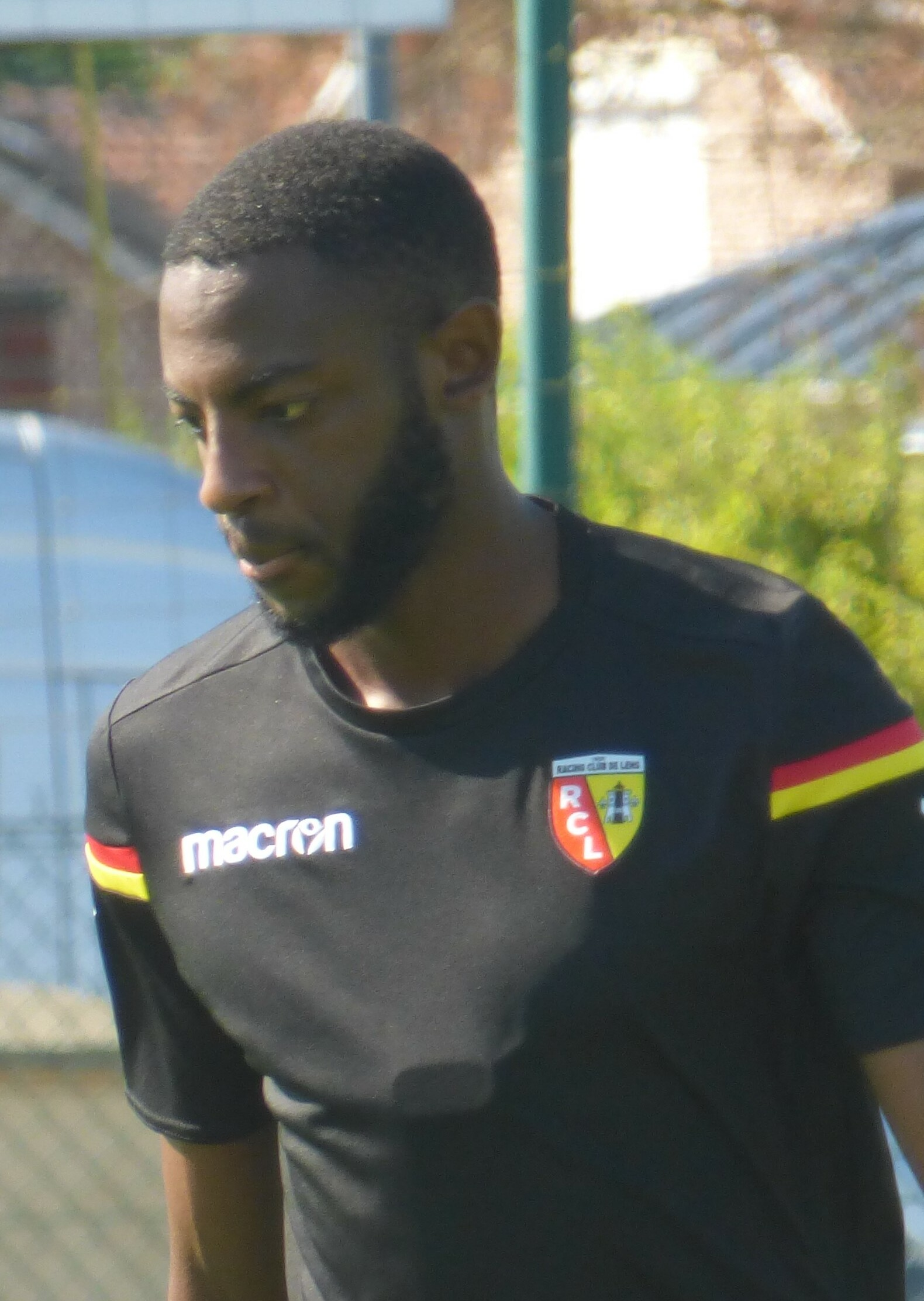
- Ba in training with Lens in 2018

Personal information
- Full name: El Hadji Ba
- Date of birth: 5 March 1993 (age 33)
- Place of birth: Paris, France
- Height: 1.83 m (6 ft 0 in)
- Position: Central midfielder

Team information
- Current team: Linense

Youth career
- 1999–2007: Aulnay
- 2007–2011: Le Havre

Senior career*
| Years | Team | Apps | (Gls) |
| 2011–2013 | Le Havre | 13 | (1) |
| 2013–2015 | Sunderland | 1 | (0) |
| 2014–2015 | → Bastia (loan) | 7 | (0) |
| 2015 | → Bastia B (loan) | 3 | (0) |
| 2015–2017 | Charlton Athletic | 25 | (0) |
| 2017 | Stabæk | 11 | (0) |
| 2017–2018 | Sochaux | 21 | (0) |
| 2018–2019 | Lens | 30 | (0) |
| 2019–2020 | Guingamp B | 3 | (0) |
| 2019–2022 | Guingamp | 48 | (2) |
| 2022–2023 | Apollon Limassol | 3 | (0) |
| 2023– | Linense | 0 | (0) |

International career^{‡}
| 2010–2011 | France U18 | 6 | (0) |
| 2012 | France U19 | 8 | (0) |
| 2012–2013 | France U20 | 5 | (0) |
| 2022–2024 | Mauritania | 6 | (0) |
- * Club domestic league appearances and goals as of 3 May 2023 ‡ National team caps and goals as of 17:10, 14 September 2026 (UTC)

El Hadji Ba (born 5 March 1993) is a professional footballer who plays as a midfielder for Spanish club Linense. Born in France, he plays for the Mauritania national team.

== Career ==
Ba made his professional debut on 24 February 2012 in a league match against Guingamp appearing as a substitute. Prior to making his debut with Le Havre, he was linked with a move to English club Tottenham Hotspur and reportedly had agreed to join the club.

On 10 July 2013, Ba joined Sunderland on a three-year contract after his Le Havre contract expired. He made his debut for Sunderland against Carlisle United in the FA Cup on 5 January 2014, and went on to score the third goal in a 3–1 victory.

On 7 August 2014, he joined Bastia on a season-long loan.

On 29 June 2015, Ba joined Charlton Athletic on a three-year deal, therefore ending his two-year spell with Sunderland. His contract with the club was terminated on 1 February 2017.

On 6 March 2017, Ba joined the Norwegian team Stabæk.

On 23 June 2022, Ba agreed to join Apollon Limassol in Cyprus.

== International career ==
Born in France, Ba's parents hail from Senegal and Mauritania. He was a French youth international, having represented his nation at under-18 level.

In 2022, he received his first invitation to represent Mauritania. He debuted with Mauritania in a 3–0 2023 Africa Cup of Nations qualification win over Sudan on 4 June 2022.

== Career statistics ==
As of match played 3 July 2023

Appearances and goals by club, season and competition
| Club | Season | League | | | National Cup | | League Cup | | Continental | | Other | | Total | |
| Club | Season | Division | Apps | Goals | Apps | Goals | Apps | Goals | Apps | Goals | Apps | Goals | Apps | Goals |
|---|---|---|---|---|---|---|---|---|---|---|---|---|---|---|
| Le Havre | 2011–12 | Ligue 2 | 1 | 0 | — | | — | | — | | — | | 1 | 0 |
| Le Havre | 2012–13 | Ligue 2 | 12 | 1 | 3 | 1 | 0 | 0 | — | | — | | 15 | 2 |
| Le Havre | Total | | 13 | 1 | 3 | 1 | 0 | 0 | — | | — | | 16 | 2 |
| Sunderland | 2013–14 | Premier League | 1 | 0 | 2 | 1 | 0 | 0 | — | | — | | 3 | 1 |
| Bastia (loan) | 2014–15 | Ligue 1 | 7 | 0 | 0 | 0 | 0 | 0 | — | | — | | 7 | 0 |
| Charlton Athletic | 2015–16 | Championship | 25 | 0 | 0 | 0 | 3 | 0 | — | | — | | 28 | 0 |
| Stabæk | 2017 | Eliteserien | 11 | 0 | 1 | 1 | — | | — | | — | | 12 | 1 |
| Sochaux | 2017–18 | Ligue 2 | 21 | 0 | 3 | 0 | 1 | 0 | — | | — | | 25 | 0 |
| Lens | 2018–19 | Ligue 2 | 30 | 0 | 1 | 0 | 1 | 1 | — | | — | | 32 | 1 |
| Guingamp | 2019–20 | Ligue 2 | 7 | 0 | 0 | 0 | 0 | 0 | — | | — | | 7 | 0 |
| Guingamp | 2020–21 | Ligue 2 | 15 | 0 | 1 | 0 | 0 | 0 | — | | — | | 16 | 0 |
| Guingamp | 2021–22 | Ligue 2 | 26 | 2 | 3 | 0 | 0 | 0 | — | | — | | 29 | 2 |
| Guingamp | Total | | 48 | 2 | 4 | 0 | 0 | 0 | — | | — | | 52 | 2 |
| Apollon Limassol | 2022–23 | Cypriot First Division | 3 | 0 | 0 | 0 | — | | 4 | 0 | 1 | 0 | 8 | 0 |
| Career total | | | 159 | 3 | 14 | 1 | 5 | 1 | 4 | 0 | 1 | 0 | 183 | 7 |
