= Andreas Hanche-Olsen =

Norwegian footballer (born 1997)

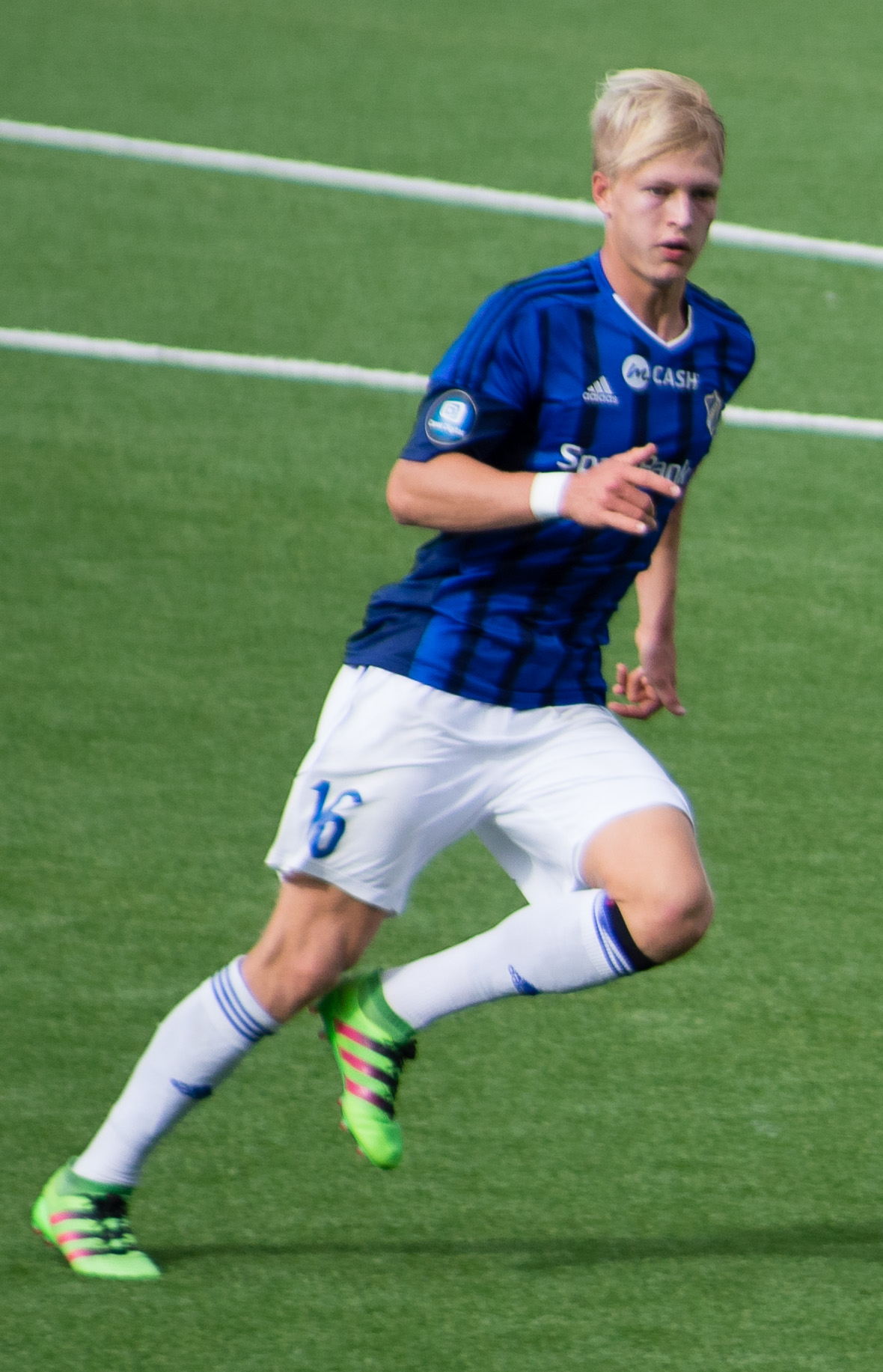
- Hanche-Olsen with Stabæk in 2016

Personal information
- Full name: Andreas Schjølberg Hanche-Olsen
- Date of birth: 17 January 1997 (age 29)
- Place of birth: Bodø, Norway
- Height: 1.85 m (6 ft 1 in)
- Positions: Centre-back; right-back

Team information
- Current team: Chicago Fire
- Number: 21

Youth career
- Øvrevoll Hosle
- Stabæk

Senior career*
Years	Team	Apps	(Gls)
2016–2020	Stabæk	111	(7)
2020–2023	Gent	66	(2)
2023–2026	Mainz 05	67	(3)
2026–	Chicago Fire	6	(0)

International career^{‡}
2013	Norway U16	8	(0)
2017–2018	Norway U21	12	(1)
2020–	Norway	22	(0)
- * Club domestic league appearances and goals as of 23:13, 17 November 2026 (UTC) ‡ National team caps and goals as of 14 October 2025

Andreas Schjølberg Hanche-Olsen (born 17 January 1997) is a Norwegian professional footballer who plays as a centre-back or right-back for Major League Soccer club Chicago Fire and the Norway national team.

== Club career ==
=== Stabæk ===
On 26 November 2015, Hanche-Olsen signed his first professional contract with Stabæk. He was named captain ahead of the 2018 season after former captain Morten Morisbak Skjønsberg retired.

=== Gent ===
On 5 October 2020, Olsen signed for a Gent for €800k fee.

On 17 October 2020, Olsen made his league debut and scored a goal against Cercle Brugge.

On 22 October 2020, Olsen made his debut on UEFA Europa League.

=== Mainz ===
On 13 January 2023, Olsen signed a four-and-a-half-year contract with Bundesliga club Mainz 05 for €2.5 million fee.

== Career statistics ==
=== Club ===
As of match played 21 December 2025

Appearances and goals by club, season and competition
Club	Season	League			National cup		Continental		Other		Total	
Club	Season	Division	Apps	Goals	Apps	Goals	Apps	Goals	Apps	Goals	Apps	Goals
Stabæk	2015	Tippeligaen	0	0	0	0	–		–		0	0
Stabæk	2016	Tippeligaen	13	1	0	0	0	0	–		13	1
Stabæk	2017	Eliteserien	28	1	5	0	0	0	–		33	1
Stabæk	2018	Eliteserien	23	0	3	0	0	0	–		26	0
Stabæk	2019	Eliteserien	29	2	4	0	0	0	–		33	2
Stabæk	2020	Eliteserien	18	3	0	0	0	0	–		18	3
Stabæk	Total		111	7	12	0	0	0	0	0	123	7
Gent	2020–21	Belgian First Division A	25	1	3	0	5	0	–		33	1
Gent	2021–22	Belgian First Division A	33	1	6	0	12	0	–		51	1
Gent	2022–23	Belgian First Division A	8	0	1	0	4 (Note: Two appearances in UEFA Europa League and two in UEFA Conference League)	0	1 (Note: Appearance in Belgian Super Cup)	0	14	0
Gent	Total		66	2	10	0	21	0	1	0	98	2
Mainz 05	2022–23	Bundesliga	17	1	1	0	–		–		18	1
Mainz 05	2023–24	Bundesliga	15	1	0	0	–		–		15	1
Mainz 05	2024–25	Bundesliga	22	1	1	0	–		–		23	1
Mainz 05	2025–26	Bundesliga	13	0	2	0	6 (Note: Appearances in UEFA Conference League)	0	–		21	0
Mainz 05	Total		67	3	4	0	6	0	–		77	3
Chicago Fire	2026	MLS	0	0	0	0	–		–		0	0
Career total			244	12	26	0	27	0	1	0	298	12

=== International ===
As of 14 October 2025

Appearances and goals by national team and year
National team	Year	Apps	Goals
Norway	2020	1	0
Norway	2021	7	0
Norway	2022	6	0
Norway	2024	7	0
Norway	2025	1	0
Total		22	0

== Honours ==
Gent

- Belgian Cup: 2021–22
