= Ola Brynhildsen =

Norwegian footballer (born 1999)

Personal information
- Full name: Ola Brynhildsen
- Date of birth: 27 April 1999 (age 27)
- Place of birth: Bærum, Norway
- Height: 1.79 m (5 ft 10 in)
- Position: Forward

Team information
- Current team: Bodø/Glimt
- Number: 17

Youth career
- 2014–2017: Stabæk

Senior career*
Years	Team	Apps	(Gls)
2017–2020	Stabæk	57	(12)
2020–2023	Molde	94	(28)
2023–2026	Midtjylland	30	(7)
2024	→ Molde (loan)	11	(10)
2025	→ Toronto FC (loan)	21	(2)
2025	→ Bodø/Glimt (loan)	1	(0)
2026–	Bodø/Glimt	21	(5)

International career^{‡}
2018	Norway U19	6	(0)
2019	Norway U20	4	(0)
2019–2020	Norway U21	6	(1)
2022–2023	Norway	4	(0)
- * Club domestic league appearances and goals as of 20 November 2026 ‡ National team caps and goals as of 28 March 2023

Ola Brynhildsen (born 27 April 1999) is a Norwegian professional footballer who plays as an forward for Eliteserien club Bodø/Glimt.

== Club career ==
On 4 May 2020, Molde announced the signing of Brynhildsen to a 2 1/2-year contract, starting from 1 July 2020. On 20 May 2020, Molde and Stabæk concluded the deal.

On 1 September 2023, Brynhildsen signed a four-year contract with Danish Superliga club Midtjylland.

On February 15, 2025, it was confirmed that Brynhildsen had been loaned to MLS club Toronto FC for the rest of the year, with an option to buy.

== Personal life ==
He is a son of Rune Brynhildsen.

== Career statistics ==
=== Club ===
As of match played 20 November 2026

Appearances and goals by club, season and competition
Club	Season	League			National cup		Continental		Other		Total	
Club	Season	Division	Apps	Goals	Apps	Goals	Apps	Goals	Apps	Goals	Apps	Goals
Stabæk	2017	Eliteserien	5	2	2	0	—		—		7	2
Stabæk	2018	Eliteserien	23	4	3	1	—		2 (Note: Appearances in Eliteserien relegation play-offs)	0	28	5
Stabæk	2019	Eliteserien	29	6	1	0	—		—		29	6
Stabæk	2020	Eliteserien	0	0	0	0	—		—		0	0
Stabæk	Total		57	12	6	1	—		2	0	65	13
Molde	2020	Eliteserien	30	5	0	0	10 (Note: Five appearances in UEFA Champions League, five appearances in UEFA Europa League)	0	—		40	5
Molde	2021	Eliteserien	30	5	3	1	4 (Note: Appearances in UEFA Europa Conference League)	3	—		37	9
Molde	2022	Eliteserien	19	11	4	1	11	5	—		34	17
Molde	2023	Eliteserien	15	7	6	3	6 (Note: Appearances in UEFA Champions League)	1	—		27	11
Molde	Total		94	28	13	5	31	9	—		138	42
Midtjylland	2023–24	Danish Superliga	24	5	3	1	—		—		27	6
Midtjylland	2024–25	Danish Superliga	6	2	0	0	5	0	—		11	2
Midtjylland	Total		30	7	3	1	5	0	—		38	8
Molde (loan)	2024	Eliteserien	11	10	3	1	4 (Note: Appearances in UEFA Conference League)	1	—		18	12
Toronto FC (loan)	2025	Major League Soccer	21	2	1	0	—		—		22	2
Bodø/Glimt (loan)	2025	Eliteserien	1	0	0	0	0	0	—		1	0
Bodø/Glimt	2026	Eliteserien	21	5	3	4	8	0	—		32	9
Bodø/Glimt	Total		22	5	3	4	8	0	—		33	9
Career total			235	64	29	12	48	10	2	0	314	86

=== International ===
As of match played 28 March 2023

Appearances and goals by national team and year
National team	Year	Apps	Goals
Norway	2022	2	0
Norway	2023	2	0
Total		4	0

== Honours ==
Molde

- Eliteserien: 2022
- Norwegian Cup: 2021–22

Midtjylland

- Danish Superliga: 2023–24
- Danish Cup: 2025–26

Bodø/Glimt

- Norwegian Football Cup: 2025–26
