= Ronald Hernández =

Venezuelan footballer (born 1997)

- Hernández with the Portland Timbers in 2026

Personal information
- Full name: Ronald José Hernández Pimentel
- Date of birth: 21 September 1997 (age 29)
- Place of birth: Barinas, Venezuela
- Height: 1.71 m (5 ft 7 in)
- Position: Right-back

Team information
- Current team: Portland Timbers
- Number: 12

Youth career
- 2015: Zamora

Senior career*
Years	Team	Apps	(Gls)
2015–2017	Zamora	17	(0)
2017–2020	Stabæk	57	(0)
2017–2020	→ Stabæk 2 (loan)	2	(0)
2020–2022	Aberdeen	6	(0)
2021	→ Atlanta United (loan)	13	(1)
2021	→ Atlanta United 2 (loan)	2	(0)
2022–2026	Atlanta United	64	(1)
2023–2025	→ Atlanta United 2 (loan)	4	(0)
2026–	Portland Timbers	0	(0)

International career^{‡}
2017	Venezuela U20	16	(0)
2018	Venezuela U21	2	(0)
2017–	Venezuela	35	(1)
- * Club domestic league appearances and goals as of 12:46, 2 September 2026 (UTC) ‡ National team caps and goals as of 23:13, 14 November 2025 (UTC)

Ronald José Hernández Pimentel (born 21 September 1997) is a Venezuelan professional footballer who plays as a right-back for the Portland Timbers and the Venezuela national team. He previously played for Zamora in Venezuela, Stabæk in Norway and Aberdeen in Scotland.

== Club career ==
=== Early career ===
On 17 August 2017, Hernández signed for Norwegian side Stabæk.

=== Aberdeen ===
On 31 January 2020, Hernández signed for Scottish top-flight team Aberdeen on a four-and-a-half-year deal. In doing so, he became the club's first ever Venezuelan player. Hernández failed to settle in Scotland with the COVID-19 pandemic starting shortly after his arrival at the club. He made six appearances for Aberdeen, all in the Scottish Premiership, before leaving the club on compassionate leave in December 2020 to be with his family in Venezuela. He was then subsequently linked with a move to MLS club Atlanta United, with whom Aberdeen have a strategic partnership.

==== Atlanta United (loan) ====
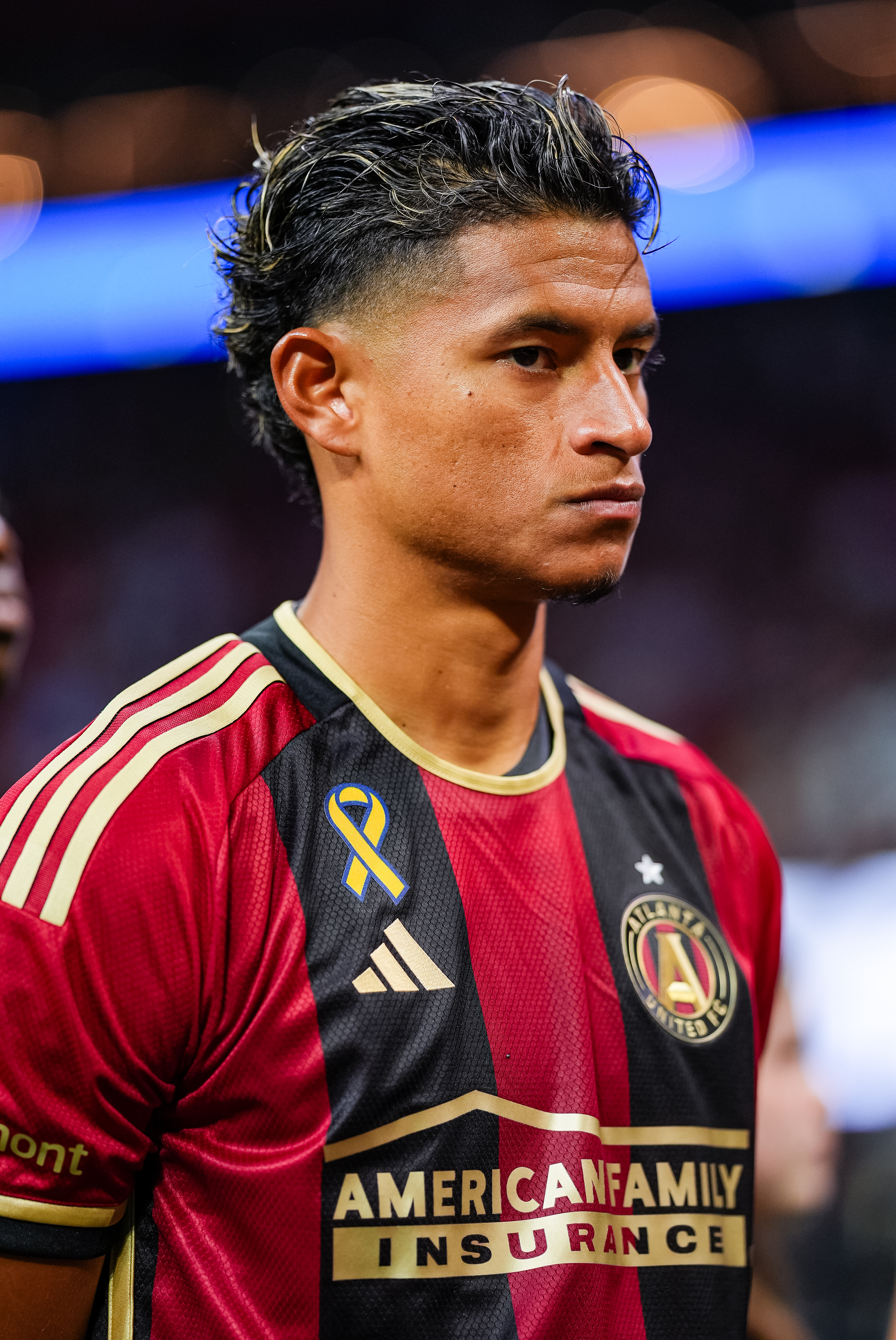
Hernández with Atlanta United in 2024

On 18 February 2021, Hernández signed with Major League Soccer club Atlanta United on loan for the 2021 season. He made his debut for Atlanta United's reserve affiliate, Atlanta United 2, on 1 May against OKC Energy, starting in the 1–0 victory. Hernández then made his Atlanta United debut on 3 July in a 3–0 defeat against the Chicago Fire, coming on as a substitute for George Bello. On 21 July, Hernández scored his first goal for Atlanta United in a 1–1 draw against FC Cincinnati. On 17 January 2022, Aberdeen confirmed Hernández had signed for Atlanta United for a "substantial transfer fee".

== International career ==
Hernández was called up to the Venezuela under-20 side for the 2017 FIFA U-20 World Cup.

== Career statistics ==
=== Club ===
As of match played on 18 October 2025

Club statistics
Club	Season	League			National Cup		Continental		Other		Total	
Club	Season	Division	Apps	Goals	Apps	Goals	Apps	Goals	Apps	Goals	Apps	Goals
Zamora	2015	Venezuelan Primera División	4	0	1	0	—		—		5	0
Zamora	2016	Venezuelan Primera División	5	0	2	0	—		—		7	0
Zamora	2017	Venezuelan Primera División	8	0	0	0	1 (Note: Appearance in the Copa Libertadores)	0	—		9	0
Zamora	Total		17	0	3	0	1	0	—		21	0
Stabæk	2017	Eliteserien	9	0	0	0	—		—		9	0
Stabæk	2018	Eliteserien	21	0	1	0	—		—		22	0
Stabæk	2019	Eliteserien	27	0	0	0	—		—		27	0
Stabæk	Total		57	0	1	0	0	0	—		58	0
Stabæk 2 (loan)	2018	Norwegian Second Division	2	0	—		—		—		2	0
Aberdeen	2019–20	Scottish Premiership	2	0	0	0	—		—		2	0
Aberdeen	2020–21	Scottish Premiership	4	0	0	0	—		—		4	0
Aberdeen	Total		6	0	0	0	0	0	0	0	6	0
Atlanta United (loan)	2021	Major League Soccer	13	1	0	0	—		—		13	1
Atlanta United	2022	Major League Soccer	13	0	2	1	—		—		15	1
Atlanta United	2023	Major League Soccer	10	0	1	0	—		3 (Note: Two appearances in Leagues Cup, one appearance in MLS Cup playoffs)	0	14	0
Atlanta United	2024	Major League Soccer	13	0	3	0	—		5 (Note: One appearance in Leagues Cup, four appearances in MLS Cup playoffs)	0	22	0
Atlanta United	2025	Major League Soccer	21	1	0	0	—		3 (Note: Appearances in Leagues Cup)	0	24	1
Atlanta United	Total		70	2	6	1	0	0	11	0	88	3
Atlanta United 2 (loan)	2021	USL Championship	2	0	—		—		—		2	0
Atlanta United 2 (loan)	2023	MLS Next Pro	1	0	—		—		—		1	0
Atlanta United 2 (loan)	2024	MLS Next Pro	2	0	—		—		—		2	0
Atlanta United 2 (loan)	2025	MLS Next Pro	1	0	—		—		—		1	0
Atlanta United 2 (loan)	Total		4	0	0	0	0	0	0	0	4	0
Career totals			151	2	10	1	1	0	11	0	181	3

=== International ===
As of match played 14 November 2025

Appearances and goals by national team and year
National team	Year	Apps	Goals
Venezuela	2017	2	0
Venezuela	2018	1	0
Venezuela	2019	12	0
Venezuela	2020	2	0
Venezuela	2021	10	1
Venezuela	2022	5	0
Venezuela	2023	1	0
Venezuela	2025	2	0
Total		35	1

Scores and results list Venezuela's goal tally first, score column indicates score after each Hernández goal.

List of international goals scored by Ronald Hernández
No.	Date	Venue	Opponent	Score	Result	Competition
1	20 June 2021	Estádio Olímpico Nilton Santos, Rio de Janeiro, Brazil	Ecuador	2–2	2–2	2021 Copa América

== Honours ==
Venezuela U20

- FIFA U-20 World Cup runner-up: 2017
- South American Youth Football Championship third place: 2017

Venezuela

- Kirin Cup: 2019
