= Rune Brynhildsen =

Norwegian journalist and CEO (born 1965)

Rune Brynhildsen (born 26 June 1965) is a former Norwegian journalist and CEO of Norway's leading commercial radio station, P4 Radio Hele Norge, as well as owner of the consultancy Brynhildsen Woldsdal Public Relations.

On 11 June 2007 he was convicted of insider trading and sentenced to ten months in prison. 1.3 million kr was confiscated.

Brynhildsen reported to Vestoppland Prison in Valdres in the autumn of 2008 to begin serving his sentence. He was released from prison some weeks later, pending his appeal.

He is the father of Ola Brynhildsen.
