= 2018–19 RC Lens season =

RC Lens
2018–19 season
- Owner: Amber Capital LP
- President: Joseph Oughourlian
- Head coach: Philippe Montanier
- Stadium: Stade Bollaert-Delelis
- Ligue 2: 5th
- Coupe de France: Round of 64
- Coupe de la Ligue: Second round
Home colours	Away colours

The 2018–19 season was the 113th season in the existence of RC Lens and the club's fourth consecutive season in the second division of French football. In addition to the domestic league, Lens participated in this season's editions of the Coupe de France and the Coupe de la Ligue. The season was scheduled to cover the period from 1 July 2018 to 30 June 2019.

== Players ==
=== First-team squad ===
As of 15 April 2019.

Note: Flags indicate national team as defined under FIFA eligibility rules; some limited exceptions apply. Players may hold more than one non-FIFA nationality.

No.	Pos.	Nation	Player
2	DF	FRA	Jean-Kévin Duverne
3	DF	FRA	Modibo Sagnan (on loan from Real Sociedad)
4	DF	TUN	Seif Teka
5	DF	ALG	Mehdi Tahrat
6	MF	FRA	Jean-Ricner Bellegarde
7	MF	FRA	El Hadji Ba
8	MF	MLI	Souleymane Diarra
9	FW	FRA	Thierry Ambrose (on loan from Manchester City)
10	MF	ALG	Walid Mesloub
11	FW	FRA	Mouaad Madri
14	FW	SEN	Yannick Gomis
15	DF	CPV	Steven Fortès (on loan from Toulouse)
16	GK	FRA	Jean-Louis Leca
18	DF	FRA	Fabien Centonze
19	DF	SEN	Arial Mendy

No.	Pos.	Nation	Player
20	FW	MAR	Achraf Bencharki (on loan from Al-Hilal)
21	DF	MLI	Massadio Haïdara
22	MF	SRB	Filip Marković
23	FW	FRA	Simon Banza
25	FW	FRA	Mounir Chouiar
26	DF	SRB	Aleksandar Radovanović
27	MF	BEL	Guillaume Gillet
28	MF	MLI	Cheick Doucouré
29	FW	FRA	Grejohn Kyei (on loan from Reims)
30	GK	FRA	Jérémy Vachoux
40	GK	FRA	Valentin Belon
—	DF	FRA	Valentin Wojtkowiak
—	MF	FRA	Nsana Simon
—	FW	SEN	Ansou Sow

=== Out on loan ===
Note: Flags indicate national team as defined under FIFA eligibility rules; some limited exceptions apply. Players may hold more than one non-FIFA nationality.

No.	Pos.	Nation	Player
—	GK	FRA	Didier Desprez (to Drancy)
—	DF	FRA	Maxence Carlier (to Tours)
—	DF	FRA	Moussa Sylla (to Bourg-en-Bresse)
—	MF	FRA	Guillaume Beghin (to Boulogne)

No.	Pos.	Nation	Player
31	MF	BFA	Cyrille Bayala (to Sochaux)
—	FW	MAR	Bilal Bari (to Nahdat Berkane)
—	FW	FRA	Benjamin Gomel (to Drancy)

== Competitions ==
=== Overview ===
Competition	First match	Last match	Starting round	Final position	Record							
Competition	First match	Last match	Starting round	Final position	Pld	W	D	L	GF	GA	GD	Win %
Ligue 2	July 2018	17 May 2019	Matchday 1	5th	38	18	9	11	49	29	+20	47.37
Coupe de France	17 November 2018	6 January 2019	Seventh round	Round of 64	3	2	0	1	6	4	+2	66.67
Coupe de la Ligue	14 August 2018	28 August 2018	First round	Second round	2	1	1	0	2	1	+1	50.00
Total					43	21	10	12	57	34	+23	48.84

Source: Soccerway

=== Ligue 2 ===
==== League table ====
Pos	Team	Pld	W	D	L	GF	GA	GD	Pts	Promotion or Relegation
3	Troyes	38	21	8	9	51	28	+23	71	Qualification to promotion play-offs semi-final
4	Paris FC	38	17	14	7	36	22	+14	65	Qualification to promotion play-offs quarter-final
5	Lens	38	18	9	11	49	28	+21	63	Qualification to promotion play-offs quarter-final
6	Lorient	38	17	12	9	51	41	+10	63	
7	Le Havre	38	13	15	10	45	40	+5	54	

Source: Ligue 2
Rules for classification: 1) Points; 2) Goal difference; 3) Number of goals scored; 4) Head-to-head goal difference; 5) Fair play points

==== Results summary ====
Overall								Home						Away					
Pld	W	D	L	GF	GA	GD	Pts	W	D	L	GF	GA	GD	W	D	L	GF	GA	GD
38	18	9	11	49	28	+21	63	11	5	3	30	9	+21	7	4	8	19	19	0

Source: Ligue 2

==== Results by round ====
Round	1	2	3	4	5	6	7	8	9	10	11	12	13	14	15	16	17	18	19	20	21	22	23	24	25	26	27	28	29	30	31	32	33	34	35	36	37	38
Ground	A	H	A	H	A	A	H	A	H	A	H	A	H	A	H	A	H	A	H	A	H	A	H	H	A	H	A	H	A	H	A	H	A	H	A	H	A	H
Result	W	W	W	W	D	L	W	W	D	W	W	L	L	L	D	D	W	D	L	L	W	L	W	D	W	W	L	W	L	D	D	D	W	L	L	W	W	W
Position	3	4	2	2	2	4	3	3	3	2	2	2	3	4	4	4	3	3	3	5	3	6	5	5	5	4	5	4	5	5	6	6	4	6	6	6	5	5

Source: Ligue 2
A = Away; H = Home; W = Win; D = Draw; L = Loss

==== Matches ====
27 July 2018 1	Orléans	0–2	Lens	Orléans
--:-- CEST (UTC+2)				Stadium: Stade de la Source

4 August 2018 2	Lens	1–0	Red Star	Lens
--:-- CEST (UTC+2)				Stadium: Stade Bollaert-Delelis

10 August 2018 3	Nancy	0–3	Lens	Tomblaine
--:-- CEST (UTC+2)				Stadium: Stade Marcel Picot

18 August 2018 4	Lens	2–0	Troyes	Lens
--:-- CEST (UTC+2)				Stadium: Stade Bollaert-Delelis

1 September 2018 6	Metz	2–0	Lens	Metz
15:00 CEST (UTC+2)	Diallo 48'; Niane 90'	Report		Stadium: Stade Saint-Symphorien; Referee: Florent Batta

15 September 2018 7	Lens	2–0	Sochaux	Lens
--:-- CEST (UTC+2)				Stadium: Stade Bollaert-Delelis

24 September 2018 8	Niort	1–2	Lens	Niort
--:-- CET (UTC+1)				Stadium: Stade René Gaillard

28 September 2018 9	Lens	0–0	Paris FC	Lens
--:-- CEST (UTC+2)				Stadium: Stade Bollaert-Delelis

2 October 2018 5	Béziers	0–0	Lens	Béziers
--:-- CEST (UTC+2)				Stadium: Stade de la Méditerranée

27 October 2018 12	Le Havre	2–1	Lens	Le Havre
--:-- CET (UTC+1)				Stadium: Stade Océane

3 November 2018 13	Lens	0–1	Châteauroux	Lens
--:-- CET (UTC+1)				Stadium: Stade Bollaert-Delelis

10 November 2018 14	Valenciennes	4–2	Lens	Valenciennes
--:-- CEST (UTC+2)				Stadium: Stade du Hainaut

4 December 2018 17	Lens	2–1	Brest	Lens
--:-- CET (UTC+1)				Stadium: Stade Bollaert-Delelis

22 December 2018 19	Lens	1–2	Ajaccio	Lens
--:-- CET (UTC+1)				Stadium: Stade Bollaert-Delelis

14 January 2019 20	Red Star	1–0	Lens	Beauvais
--:-- CEST (UTC+2)				Stadium: Stade Pierre Brisson

28 January 2019 22	Troyes	1–0	Lens	Troyes
--:-- CEST (UTC+2)				Stadium: Stade de l'Aube

9 February 2019 24	Lens	0–0	Metz	Lens
CET (UTC+1)		Report		Stadium: Stade Bollaert-Delelis

3 March 2019 27	Paris FC	2–0	Lens	Paris
--:-- CET (UTC+1)				Stadium: Stade Sebastien Charléty

18 March 2019 29	Gazélec Ajaccio	1–0	Lens	Ajaccio
--:-- CET (UTC+1)				Stadium: Stade Ange Casanova

23 April 2019 34	Lens	0–1	Lorient	Lens
20:00 CEST (UTC+2)				Stadium: Stade Bollaert-Delelis

27 April 2019 35	Brest	2–0	Lens	Brest
15:00 CEST (UTC+2)				Stadium: Stade Francis-Le Blé

=== Coupe de France ===
6 January 2019 Round of 64	Reims	2–0	Lens	Reims
14:15 CET (UTC+1)	Oudin 32'; Cafaro 36' (pen.)	Report		Stadium: Stade Auguste Delaune; Attendance: 8,232; Referee: Frank Schneider

=== Coupe de la Ligue ===
28 August 2018 Second round	Lens	1–1 (3–5 p)	Metz	Lens
20:45 CEST (UTC+2)	Ba 86'	Report	Jallow 45'	Stadium: Stade Bollaert-Delelis; Attendance: 14,963; Referee: Olivier Thual
	Penalties
	Ba (penalty scored); Fortuné (penalty scored); Chouiar (penalty missed); Gomis (penalty scored)		(penalty scored) Niane; (penalty scored) Gakpa; (penalty scored) Balliu; (penalty scored) Rivierez; (penalty scored) Diallo
