= Moussa Njie =

Somali footballer (born 1995)

Personal information
- Full name: Moussa Jailani Gaucho Njie
- Date of birth: 2 October 1995 (age 31)
- Place of birth: Oslo, Norway
- Height: 1.85 m (6 ft 1 in)
- Position: Winger

Team information
- Current team: Moss (on loan from KFUM Oslo)
- Number: 10

Youth career
- –2011: Holmlia
- 2012–2013: Vålerenga

Senior career*
Years	Team	Apps	(Gls)
2013–2015	Vålerenga	3	(0)
2015–2016	Bærum	15	(3)
2016–2018	Stabæk	65	(6)
2019–2020	Partizan	2	(0)
2019	→ Odd (loan)	4	(0)
2021–2022	Sandefjord	7	(0)
2022–	KFUM Oslo	79	(15)
2026–	→ Moss (loan)	7	(0)

International career
2026–	Somalia	1	(0)
- * Club domestic league appearances and goals as of 14 November 2026

Moussa Jailani Gaucho Njie (born 2 October 1995) is a professional footballer who plays for Moss, on loan from KFUM Oslo and the Somalia national team.

== Career ==
Njie played youth football for his childhood club Holmlia SK. He made his Eliteserien debut for Vålerenga Fotball in November 2013 against Aalesund. In the summer of 2015 he joined Bærum. On 2 December 2015 he signed for Stabæk. On 17 January 2019 he signed for Partizan.

== Personal life ==
Njie was born in Norway to a Gambian father and Somali mother, and was eligible for all three national teams. He is the older brother of Bilal Njie.

== Career statistics ==
=== Club ===
As of 14 November 2026

Appearances and goals by club, season and competition
Club	Season	League			National cup		Europe		Other		Total	
Club	Season	Division	Apps	Goals	Apps	Goals	Apps	Goals	Apps	Goals	Apps	Goals
Vålerenga	2013	Eliteserien	1	0	0	0	—		—		1	0
Vålerenga	2014	Eliteserien	2	0	0	0	—		—		2	0
Vålerenga	2015	Eliteserien	0	0	2	3	—		—		2	3
Vålerenga	Total		3	0	2	3	—		—		5	3
Bærum	2015	1. divisjon	15	3	0	0	—		—		15	3
Stabæk	2016	Eliteserien	28	4	4	2	2 (Note: Appearances in UEFA Europa League)	0	2 (Note: Appearance in Eliteserien play-offs)	0	36	6
Stabæk	2017	Eliteserien	22	1	2	1	—		—		24	2
Stabæk	2018	Eliteserien	15	1	0	0	—		2	0	17	1
Stabæk	Total		65	6	6	3	2	0	4	0	77	9
Partizan	2018–19	Serbian SuperLiga	2	0	0	0	—		—		2	0
Odd (loan)	2019	Eliteserien	4	0	0	0	—		—		4	0
Sandefjord	2021	Eliteserien	7	0	2	0	—		—		9	0
KFUM Oslo	2022	1. divisjon	24	9	2	0	—		1	0	27	9
KFUM Oslo	2023	1. divisjon	14	3	0	0	—		—		14	3
KFUM Oslo	2024	Eliteserien	21	1	6	1	—		—		27	2
KFUM Oslo	2025	Eliteserien	20	2	3	2	—		—		23	4
KFUM Oslo	2026	Eliteserien	0	0	1	0	—		—		1	0
KFUM Oslo	Total		79	15	12	3	—		1	0	92	14
Moss	2026	1. divisjon	7	0	0	0	—		—		7	0
Career total			182	24	24	9	2	0	5	0	213	32

== Honours ==
Partizan

- Serbian Cup: 2019
