= Ohi Omoijuanfo =

Norwegian footballer (born 1994)

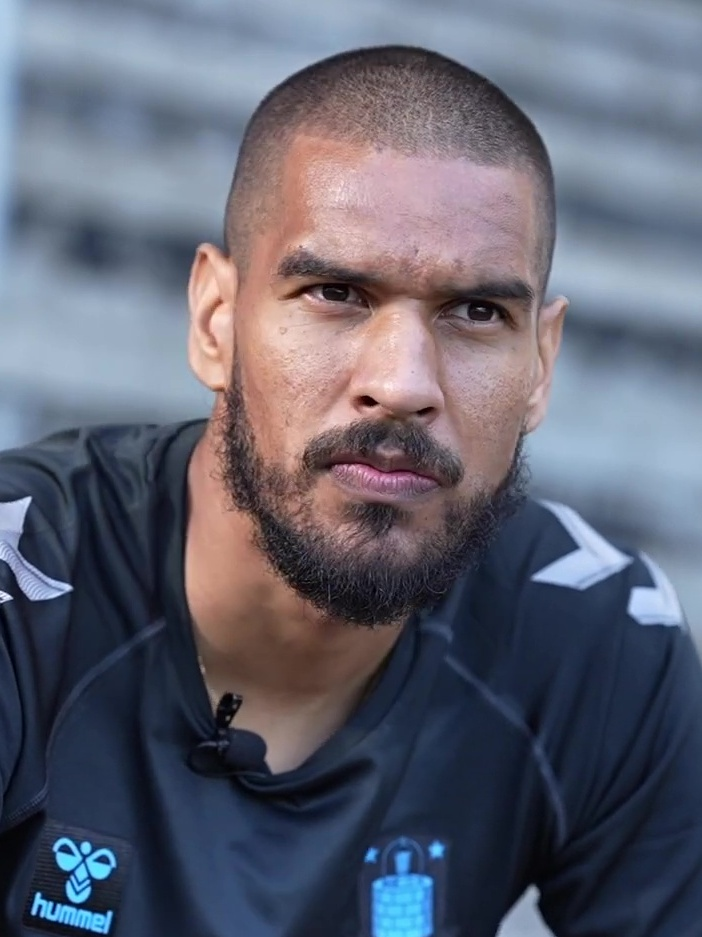
- Omoijuanfo in 2022

Personal information
- Full name: Anthony Ohikhuaeme Omoijuanfo
- Date of birth: 10 January 1994 (age 32)
- Place of birth: Oslo, Norway
- Height: 1.88 m (6 ft 2 in)
- Position: Forward

Team information
- Current team: Changchun Yatai
- Number: 9

Youth career
- Holmlia

Senior career*
Years	Team	Apps	(Gls)
2010	Holmlia	2	(1)
2011–2014	Lillestrøm	82	(9)
2015	Jerv	31	(16)
2016–2019	Stabæk	85	(29)
2019–2022	Molde	83	(54)
2022	Red Star Belgrade	18	(10)
2022–2025	Brøndby	59	(23)
2025–	Changchun Yatai	59	(15)

International career
2010	Norway U16	6	(3)
2011	Norway U17	13	(4)
2011–2012	Norway U18	14	(3)
2013	Norway U19	6	(3)
2014–2016	Norway U21	7	(1)
2017–2022	Norway	2	(1)
- * Club domestic league appearances and goals as of 7 November 2026

Anthony Ohikhuaeme "Ohi" Omoijuanfo (born 10 January 1994) is a Norwegian professional footballer who plays as a forward for China League One side Changchun Yatai.

== Club career ==
=== Lillestrøm ===
On the last day of the 2010 season, Omoijuanfo became the youngest ever goalscorer in the Norwegian top division, at 16 years and 300 days. His record was broken by Håkon Lorentzen of Brann in 2013. On 16 March 2011, Omoijuanfo signed a professional contract with Lillestrøm which would end after the 2013 season. On 23 May 2013, it was announced that Omoijuanfo had agreed to a new contract that would keep him at Lillestrøm till the end of the 2015 season.

=== Jerv ===
On 5 March 2015, Omoijuanfo joined Jerv on a free transfer and agreed to a contract that lasted till the end of the 2015 season.

=== Stabæk ===
On 4 November 2015, Omoijuanfo signed a three-year contract with Stabæk Fotball, to commence on 1 January 2016. He made his Stabæk debut on 11 March 2016 in an Eliteserien game Stabæk lost 1–0 away against Aalesund. Omoijuanfo scored his first goal for Stabæk on 3 April 2016 in a game Stabæk lost 3–1 away against Bodø/Glimt.

One of his most important performances of the 2016 Eliteserien playoff, when Stabæk faced his old club Jerv in a relegation playout. Stabæk was 0–1 down on aggregate when Omoijuanfo scored twice in the 83rd and 85th minute, Stabæk avoiding relegation.

In the 2017 Eliteserien, Omoijuanfo scored 17 goals and became runner-up on the top goalscorer chart behind Nicklas Bendtner. He was more often fielded as a winger in the 2018 Eliteserien and scored less frequently.

=== Molde ===
On 21 March 2019, Omoijuanfo joined Molde FK for a reported fee of between NOK 9 million and NOK 12 million. He signed a three-year deal with the club. Omoijuanfo made his Molde debut on 31 March 2019 in a 1–1 away draw against Sarpsborg 08. On 7 April 2019, he scored his first goal for the club in his home debut in Molde's 3–0 win against his former club Stabæk. On 10 April 2019, Omoijuanfo scored Molde's first goal in the club's 4–1 win against Vålerenga, his second goal in two home games at Aker Stadion. He scored a brace at Haugesund Stadion on 5 May 2019 in Molde's 2–1 win against Haugesund. Omoijuanfo scored his third Eliteserien hat-trick, his first for Molde, in his team's 5–1 win against Viking on 20 May 2019. On 11 July 2019, he scored Molde's seventh goal in the club's UEFA competitions record 7–1 win over KR in the UEFA Europa League first qualifying round. On the 2019 Norwegian football awards Fotballfesten, Omoijuanfo was honoured as a role model through receiving Årets spillerforbilde (Role Model Player of the Year). Omoijuanfo finished his first season at Molde with 17 goals in 35 matches in all competitions.

=== Red Star ===
On 3 July 2021, Red Star announced the transfer of Omoijuanfo to Belgrade and the signing of a three-year contract, which will become active on 1 January 2022. Omoijuanfo will join Red Star upon the expiration of its contract with Molde as a free agent, without compensation.

=== Brøndby ===
After weeks of speculation, Omoijuanfo joined Danish Superliga club Brøndby on 30 August 2022, signing a contract until June 2025. He made his debut on 4 September 2022, scoring Brøndby's first goal in a 2–0 win over Horsens. Omoijuanfo impressed early in his Brøndby career, scoring three goals and providing one assist in his first five appearances. In February 2023, he was appointed vice-captain, filling in for the injured Kevin Mensah after Andreas Maxsø's departure. He finished the 2022–23 season with 13 goals in 25 appearances.

Ahead of the 2023–24 season, Omoijuanfo was expected to continue his strong form, with several pundits predicting a battle for the top scorer title. However, he struggled early in the season, and despite his efforts, could only score his first goal from a penalty shot in the sixth game against Vejle. His role in the team became more limited due to tactical changes under new head coach Jesper Sørensen, and injuries further hindered his progress. He often appeared as a substitute, affecting his ability to maintain consistent form. Omoijuanfo's fortunes briefly improved with a decisive 2–1 win over Viborg FF on 10 March 2024, scoring a stunning injury-time goal after a quick one-two with Noah Nartey. He finished his second season with Brøndby with 10 goals in 34 appearances.

Ahead of the 2024–25 season, Omoijuanfo found himself further relegated in Brøndby's hierarchy, receiving limited playing time under Sørensen. Before being sold in January 2025, Omoijuanfo scored two goals in nine appearances for Brøndby in six months, of which only two were as a starter.

=== Changchun Yatai ===
On 11 January 2025, Brøndby announced Omoijuanfo's transfer to Chinese Super League side Changchun Yatai.

== International career ==
Omoijuanfo played a total of 46 games and scored 14 goals for Norway at international youth level.

After a good run of form with Stabæk and scoring nine goals in the first ten games of the 2017 Eliteserien, on 30 May 2017 Omoijuanfo was named by manager Lars Lagerbäck in the Norway senior team squad to face Czech Republic and Sweden in international friendlies. He made his international debut on 13 June 2017 at Ullevaal Stadion, replacing Alexander Søderlund in the second half against Sweden.

== Personal life ==
Ohi Omoijuanfo's father is Nigerian and his mother is Norwegian. He is Christian and often celebrates goals by revealing t-shirts from under his kit with texts about Jesus.

== Career statistics ==
=== Club ===
As of match played 7 November 2026

Appearances and goals by club, season and competition
Club	Season	League			National cup (Note: Includes Norwegian Cup, Serbian Cup, Danish Cup)		Europe		Other		Total	
Club	Season	Division	Apps	Goals	Apps	Goals	Apps	Goals	Apps	Goals	Apps	Goals
Lillestrøm	2010	Tippeligaen	1	1	0	0	—		—		1	1
Lillestrøm	2011	Tippeligaen	21	3	3	0	—		—		24	3
Lillestrøm	2012	Tippeligaen	17	1	3	1	—		—		20	2
Lillestrøm	2013	Tippeligaen	19	3	5	0	—		—		24	3
Lillestrøm	2014	Tippeligaen	24	1	5	2	—		—		29	3
Lillestrøm	Total		82	9	16	3	—		—		98	12
Jerv	2015	Norwegian First Division	29	15	2	1	—		4 (Note: Appearances in Eliteserien play-offs)	2	35	18
Stabæk	2016	Tippeligaen	28	4	4	3	2 (Note: Appearances in UEFA Europa League)	0	2	2	36	9
Stabæk	2017	Eliteserien	27	17	4	2	—		—		31	19
Stabæk	2018	Eliteserien	30	8	2	2	—		2	0	34	10
Stabæk	Total		85	29	10	7	2	0	4	2	101	38
Molde	2019	Eliteserien	27	15	1	0	7	2	—		35	17
Molde	2020	Eliteserien	27	12	0	0	11 (Note: Five appearances and one goal in UEFA Champions League, six appearances and three goals in UEFA Europa League)	4	—		38	16
Molde	2021	Eliteserien	29	27	0	0	3 (Note: Appearances in UEFA Conference League)	1	—		32	28
Molde	Total		83	54	1	0	21	7	—		105	61
Red Star Belgrade	2021–22	Serbian SuperLiga	16	9	4	2	2	0	—		22	11
Red Star Belgrade	2022–23	Serbian SuperLiga	2	1	0	0	0	0	—		2	1
Red Star Belgrade	Total		18	10	4	2	2	0	—		24	12
Brøndby	2022–23	Danish Superliga	24	13	1	0	0	0	—		25	13
Brøndby	2023–24	Danish Superliga	31	10	3	0	—		—		34	10
Brøndby	2024–25	Danish Superliga	4	0	1	0	4	2	—		9	2
Brøndby	Total		59	23	5	0	4	2	—		68	25
Changchun Yatai	2025	Chinese Super League	30	6	1	0	—		—		31	6
Changchun Yatai	2026	China League One	29	9	0	0	—		—		29	9
Changchun Yatai	Total		59	15	1	0	—		—		60	15
Career total			415	155	39	13	29	9	8	4	491	181

=== International ===
As of match played 17 November 2022

Appearances and goals by national team and year
National team	Year	Apps	Goals
Norway	2017	1	0
Norway	2022	1	1
Total		2	1

Scores and results list Norway's goal tally first, score column indicates score after each Omoijuanfo goal.

List of international goals scored by Ohi Omoijuanfo
No.	Date	Venue	Opponent	Score	Result	Competition
1	17 November 2022	Aviva Stadium, Dublin, Ireland	Republic of Ireland	2–1	2–1	Friendly

== Honours ==
Molde

- Eliteserien: 2019

Red Star Belgrade

- Serbian SuperLiga: 2021–22
- Serbian Cup: 2021–22

Individual

- Eliteserien Player of the Month: June 2021
- Eliteserien Top goalscorer: 2021
