= Toni Ordinas =

Spanish football manager (born 1974)

Personal information
- Full name: Antoni Ordinas Pou
- Date of birth: 19 August 1974 (age 52)
- Position: Central defender

Team information
- Current team: Lillestrøm

Managerial career
- Years: Team
- CD Llosetense (youth)
- Beato Ramon Llull CF (youth)
- VF Playas de Calvià (youth)
- CD San Francisco (youth)
- Atletico Baleares (assistant)
- 2013–2016: Stabæk (junior team)
- 2016–2018: Stabæk
- 2018: Stabæk (developer)
- 2019–2025: Lillestrøm (head developer)

Toni Ordinas (born 19 August 1974) is a Spanish football manager.

Hailing from Mallorca, Ordinas played as a central defender for minor clubs including CD Llosetense. He took the UEFA Pro Licence in his early 30s, and was a youth coach in numerous Balearic clubs. He moved to Norway in 2013 to pursue a career, doubling as a coach at the Norwegian School of Elite Sport and Stabæk Fotball.

Ordinas led the junior team. He was a candidate for the first-team head coach position ahead of the 2014 season, but was ultimately given the chance when Billy McKinlay was fired in the summer of 2016. After being let go in the summer of 2018, he remained in Stabæk's development team until 1 January 2019, when he became head player developer in Lillestrøm SK.
