= Raymond Gyasi =

Ghanaian professional footballer (born 1994)

Personal information
- Full name: Raymond Gyasi
- Date of birth: 5 August 1994 (age 32)
- Place of birth: Amsterdam, Netherlands
- Height: 1.81 m (5 ft 11 1/2 in)
- Position: Winger

Team information
- Current team: DFC

Youth career
- Zeeburgia
- AZ

Senior career*
Years	Team	Apps	(Gls)
2013–2016	AZ	0	(0)
2015	→ Roda JC (loan)	13	(1)
2015–2016	→ Emmen (loan)	29	(6)
2016–2017	Cambuur	13	(0)
2017–2019	Stabæk	20	(1)
2020	RoPS	3	(0)
2020-2021	Kazma	0	(0)
2021-2022	Noah	24	(1)
2022	De Treffers	9	(3)
2023-2024	HHC	11	(1)
2024-2026	Kruisland		
2026-	DFC		

International career
2015	Ghana U23	1	(0)
- * Club domestic league appearances and goals as of 25 July 2024

Raymond Gyasi (born 5 August 1994) is a Dutch-born Ghanaian footballer who plays as a winger for DFC Dordrecht.

== Career ==
Gyasi was born in the Netherlands to parents of Ghanaian descent. He was called up to join the Ghana national under-23 football team, and made his debut in a 2–0 win against the Mozambique U23s.

He joined Stabæk in 2017, his brother Edwin Gyasi already playing in the Norwegian league. After a decent 2017 season he broke his leg in late March 2018, just as the new season was about to start, and missed most of the year. He was able to return to the B team in late August 2018. Gyasi never reclaimed a place in the team, and in 2019 he only featured in three cup games and three league games. His contract expired at the end of 2019, and he was released by Stabæk. In January 2020 he joined Finnish team RoPS. In September 2020, Gyasi signed for Kazma SC.

=== Noah ===
On 16 February 2021, Gyasi signed for Noah of the Armenian Premier League. Gyasi left Noah in June 2022.

=== De Treffers ===
On 17 October 2022, De Treffers announced the singing of Gyasi. On 3 January 2023, De Treffers confirmed that Gyasi had left the club following the expiration of his contract on 31 December 2022.

After leaving De Treffers, Gyasi played for fellow amateur sides HHC, SC Kruisland and DFC.

== Career statistics ==
=== Club ===
As of match played 21 July 2019

Appearances and goals by club, season and competition
Club	Season	League			National Cup		Europe		Total	
Club	Season	Division	Apps	Goals	Apps	Goals	Apps	Goals	Apps	Goals
AZ Alkmaar	2013–14	Eredivisie	0	0	0	0	–		0	0
AZ Alkmaar	Total		0	0	0	0	-	-	0	0
Roda (loan)	2014–15	Eerste Divisie	13	1	0	0	–		13	1
Roda (loan)	Total		13	1	0	0	-	-	13	1
Emmen (loan)	2015–16	Eerste Divisie	29	6	2	1	–		32	7
Emmen (loan)	Total		29	6	2	1	-	-	31	7
Cambuur	2016–17	Eerste Divisie	13	0	1	0	–		13	0
Cambuur	Total		13	0	1	0	-	-	14	0
Stabæk	2017	Eliteserien	17	1	3	1	–		20	2
Stabæk	2018	Eliteserien	0	0	0	0	–		0	0
Stabæk	2019	Eliteserien	3	0	3	2	–		5	2
Stabæk	Total		20	1	6	3	-	-	25	4
Career total			75	8	9	4	-	-	83	12
