= Morten Renå Olsen =

Norwegian footballer (born 1999)

Personal information
- Full name: Morten Renå Olsen
- Date of birth: 2 June 1999 (age 27)
- Place of birth: Norway
- Position: Defender

Youth career
- Graabein
- –2017: Stabæk

Senior career*
| Years | Team | Apps | (Gls) |
| 2017–2019 | Stabæk | 2 | (0) |
| 2018 | → HamKam (loan) | 8 | (0) |
| 2019 | → Notodden (loan) | 24 | (0) |
| 2020–2021 | Strømmen | 56 | (4) |
| 2022–2023 | Skeid | 22 | (0) |

International career
| 2017 | Norway U18 | 12 | (0) |
| 2018 | Norway U19 | 1 | (0) |
- * Club domestic league appearances and goals as of 1 November 2023

Morten Renå Olsen (born 2 June 1999) is a retired Norwegian football player who played as defender.

For the 2018 season he was loaned out to second-tier newcomers Hamarkameratene. In 2019 he was loaned out to Notodden FK, also on the second tier.

In October 2023, Olsen announced his retirement at the end of the year.
