= Håkon Skogseid =

Norwegian footballer (born 1988)

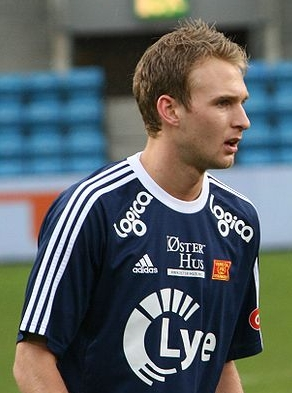

Personal information
- Full name: Håkon Skogseid
- Date of birth: 14 January 1988 (age 38)
- Place of birth: Bærum, Norway
- Height: 1.86 m (6 ft 1 in)
- Position: Defender

Youth career
- Stabæk

Senior career*
| Years | Team | Apps | (Gls) |
| 2006–2007 | Stabæk | 1 | (0) |
| 2007–2009 | Notodden | 35 | (0) |
| 2009–2015 | Viking | 154 | (8) |
| 2015 | OB | 15 | (0) |
| 2015–2016 | Lillestrøm | 35 | (0) |
| 2017–2018 | Stabæk | 23 | (2) |

International career
| 2008–2010 | Norway U21 | 9 | (0) |
- * Club domestic league appearances and goals

Håkon Skogseid (born 14 January 1988) is a Norwegian former footballer who played as a right back.

He signed for Viking FK in January 2009, after having previously played for Stabæk and Notodden FK. Skogseid also played for the Norwegian U21 team.

== Career statistics ==
Appearances and goals by club, season and competition
| Club | Season | League | | | Cup | | Total | |
| Club | Season | Division | Apps | Goals | Apps | Goals | Apps | Goals |
|---|---|---|---|---|---|---|---|---|
| 2006 | Stabæk | Tippeligaen | 1 | 0 | 0 | 0 | 1 | 0 |
| 2007 | Stabæk | Tippeligaen | 0 | 0 | 1 | 0 | 1 | 0 |
| 2007 | Notodden | 1. divisjon | 5 | 0 | 2 | 0 | 7 | 0 |
| 2008 | Notodden | 1. divisjon | 30 | 0 | 0 | 0 | 30 | 0 |
| 2009 | Viking | Tippeligaen | 30 | 3 | 2 | 0 | 32 | 3 |
| 2010 | Viking | Tippeligaen | 29 | 2 | 5 | 0 | 34 | 2 |
| 2011 | Viking | Tippeligaen | 27 | 0 | 5 | 0 | 32 | 0 |
| 2012 | Viking | Tippeligaen | 27 | 1 | 4 | 0 | 31 | 1 |
| 2013 | Viking | Tippeligaen | 28 | 1 | 3 | 0 | 31 | 1 |
| 2014 | Viking | Tippeligaen | 13 | 1 | 3 | 0 | 16 | 1 |
| 2014–15 | OB | Superliga | 15 | 0 | 0 | 0 | 15 | 0 |
| 2015 | Lillestrøm | Tippeligaen | 7 | 0 | 0 | 0 | 7 | 0 |
| 2016 | Lillestrøm | Tippeligaen | 28 | 0 | 1 | 0 | 29 | 0 |
| 2017 | Stabæk | Eliteserien | 23 | 2 | 3 | 0 | 26 | 2 |
| Career Total | | | 263 | 10 | 29 | 0 | 292 | 10 |
