= J.J. Ugland Stadion – Levermyr =

Norwegian multi-purpose sports stadium

J.J. Ugland Stadion - Levermyr
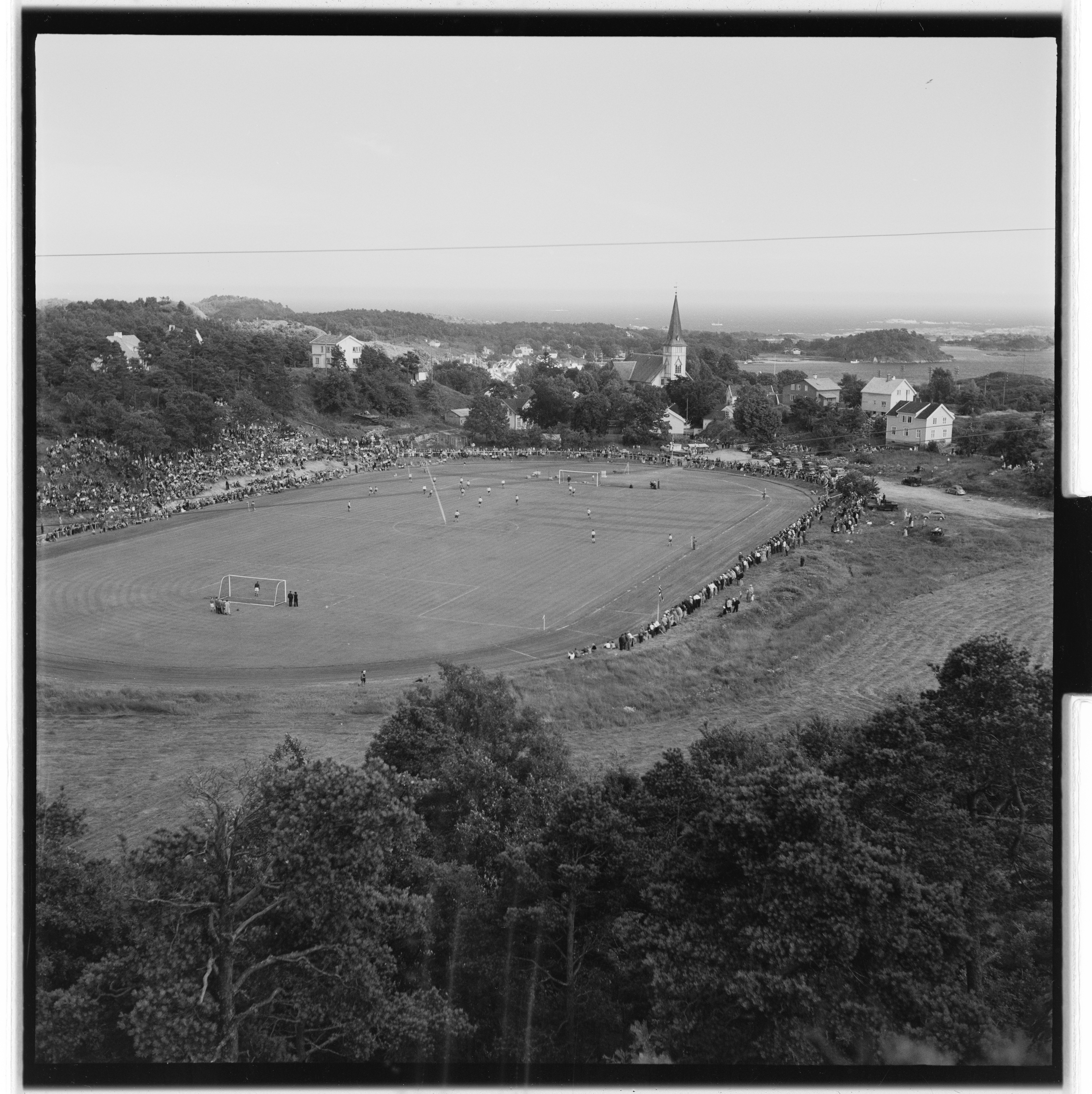
- Interactive map of J.J. Ugland Stadion - Levermyr
- Location: Grimstad, Norway
- Coordinates: 58.3455°N 8.5917°E
- Capacity: 3,300

Construction
- Built: 1983
- Opened: 1983

Tenants
- FK Jerv (football); Amazon Grimstad (football); Sørild FIK (athletics)

J.J. Ugland Stadion – Levermyr, more commonly (and formerly) known as Levermyr stadion, is a multi-purpose stadium in Grimstad, Norway and home of the OBOS-ligaen team FK Jerv (men's football), the 1. Division team Amazon Grimstad (women's football), and Sørild FIK (athletics/track and field).

The stadium itself is owned by the municipality, and it located just a few hundred meters from the town centre, in the Levermyr area. Though opening as a multi-purpose arena in 1983, football have been played here for much longer. The capacity of the stadium is currently 3,300. The record attendance is around 8,000, from a national B-team men's football match between Norway and Finland in 1963, while Jerv's record is around 7,000 from a cup match against Viking in 1976. Amazon Grimstad's record is 5,000 from a show match against BUL Oslo in the summer of 1970. The more recent record attendance is some 3,000 in a cup clash between Jerv and rivals Start in 2010.

When Jerv was promoted to the OBOS-ligaen before the 2015 season, parts of the stadium had to be rebuilt to meet requirements from the Norwegian Football Association.

The stadium ran into problems in 2005, after being evaluated as inadequate by the Norwegian Athletics Association. This led to the licence for track and field being withdrawn. The stadium eventually got its licence back, after upgrading the running track. On 28 November 2007, the municipality council decided that the stadium was to be renewed to meet the requirements of the Norwegian Football Association for Amazon's participation in Toppserien. Local shipowner and former Jerv player Johan Jørgen Ugland lent the municipality 20 million Norwegian kroner as an interest free loan to help the municipality upgrade the stadium. The building started in 2009, and Ugland later said he would cover any cost between 20 and 27 million kroner as the upgrade became more expensive than anticipated. On 3 May 2010, about a month after Ugland's death, the municipality council decided to rename the stadium 'J.J. Ugland Stadion – Levermyr', just before the re-opening later the same month. The before mentioned current upgrades for Jerv's participation in OBOS-ligaen are still ongoing, as floodlights are to be installed before the 2017 season and field heating before the 2018 season.

== Jerv attendance ==
Attendance
Season	Avg	Min	Max	Rank	Ref
2015	1,050	441	1,750	9	
2016	1,074	721	1,406	10	
2021	900	526	2,610	7	
