= Tonny Brochmann =

Danish footballer (born 1989)

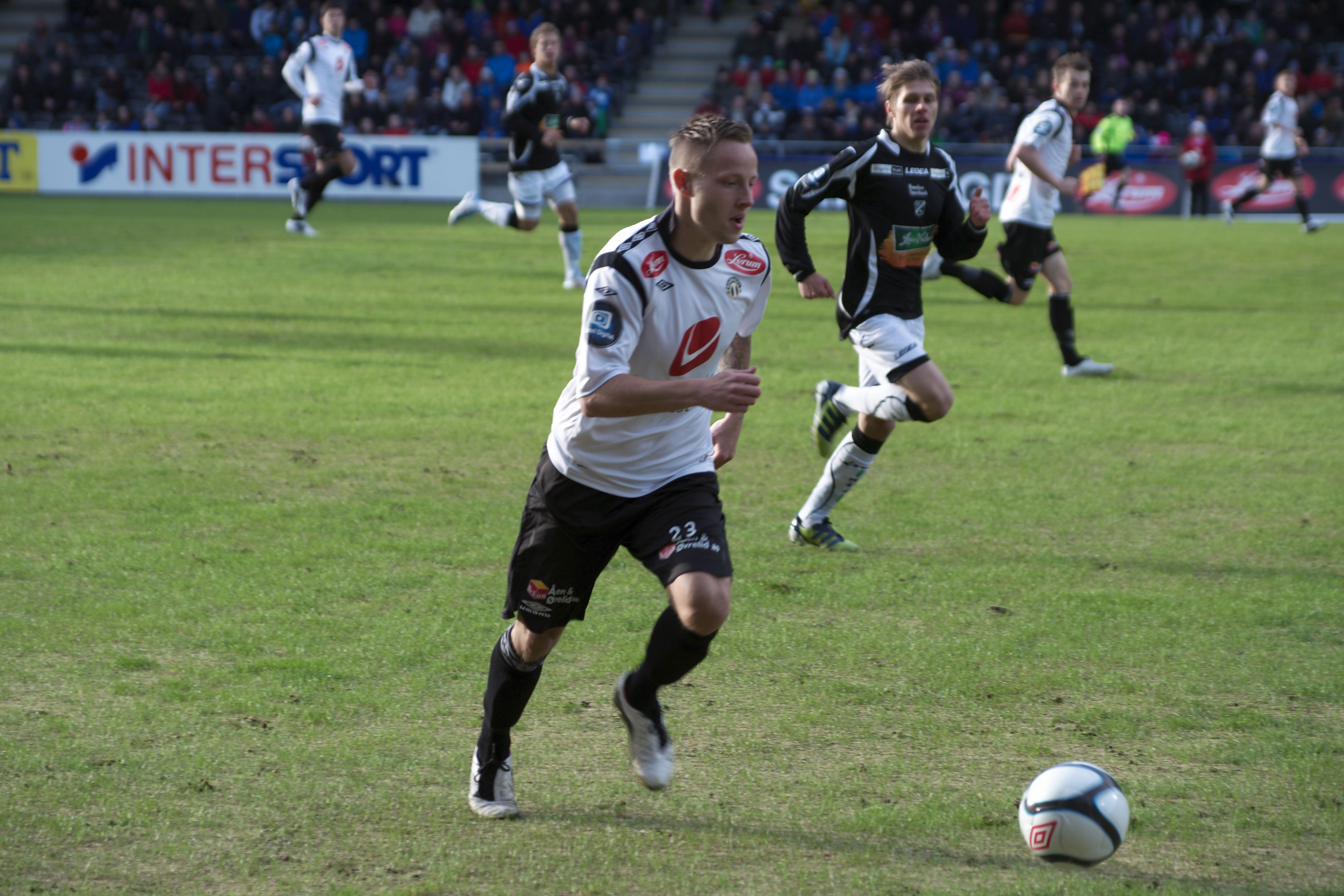
- Tonny Brochmann Christensen (2012)

Personal information
- Full name: Tonny Brochmann Christiansen
- Date of birth: 11 August 1989 (age 37)
- Place of birth: Horsens, Denmark
- Height: 1.71 m (5 ft 7 in)
- Position: Midfielder

Youth career
- Horsens

Senior career*
Years	Team	Apps	(Gls)
2009–2011	Horsens	8	(1)
2011–2014	Sogndal	55	(7)
2015	Sandnes Ulf	23	(1)
2016	Jerv	28	(9)
2017–2018	Stabæk	46	(11)
2018–2021	Mjøndalen	69	(14)
2021–2022	Horsens	22	(2)
2022	Fredericia	2	(0)
- * Club domestic league appearances and goals as of 17:22, 26 June 2022 (UTC)

Tonny Brochmann Christiansen (born 11 August 1989) is a Danish footballer who plays as a midfielder. He has previously played for Horsens, Sogndal, Sandnes Ulf, Jerv, Stabæk and Mjøndalen.

== Career ==
=== AC Horsens ===
Brochmann was born in Horsens and he started his career with Horsens in 2009.

=== Sogndal Fotball ===
Brochmann joined Sogndal in 2011. He made his debut for Sogndal in a 1–1 draw against Vålerenga.

=== FK Jerv ===
Brochmann joined Jerv on 1 March 2016. He went on to score in his OBOS-ligaen debut when Jerv defeated Ranheim 2–1 at home stadium Levermyr on 3 April 2016.

=== Stabæk ===
Before the 2017 season Brochmann signed for Stabæk.

=== Mjøndalen ===
On the last day of the transfer window Brochmann signed for Mjøndalen.

== Career statistics ==
=== Club ===
As of match played 4 July 2021

Appearances and goals by club, season and competition
Club	Season	League			National Cup		Continental		Other		Total	
Club	Season	Division	Apps	Goals	Apps	Goals	Apps	Goals	Apps	Goals	Apps	Goals
Sogndal	2011	Tippeligaen	12	1	0	0	-		-		12	1
Sogndal	2012	Tippeligaen	25	5	1	0	-		-		26	5
Sogndal	2013	Tippeligaen	1	0	0	0	-		-		1	0
Sogndal	2014	Tippeligaen	17	1	2	1	-		-		19	2
Sogndal	Total		55	7	3	1	-	-	-	-	58	8
Sandnes Ulf	2015	OBOS-ligaen	23	1	1	0	-		-		24	1
Sandnes Ulf	Total		23	1	1	0	-	-	-	-	24	1
Jerv	2016	OBOS-ligaen	28	9	2	0	-		-		30	9
Jerv	Total		28	9	2	0	-	-	-	-	30	9
Stabæk	2017	Eliteserien	30	8	1	1	-		-		31	9
Stabæk	2018	Eliteserien	16	3	3	0	-		-		19	3
Stabæk	Total		46	11	4	1	-	-	-	-	50	12
Mjøndalen	2018	OBOS-ligaen	11	3	0	0	-		-		11	3
Mjøndalen	2019	Eliteserien	28	8	2	0	-		-		30	8
Mjøndalen	2020	Eliteserien	21	2	0	0	-		-		21	2
Mjøndalen	2021	Eliteserien	9	1	0	0	-		-		9	1
Mjøndalen	Total		69	14	2	0	-	-	-	-	71	14
Horsens	2021–22	NordicBet Liga	0	0	0	0	-		-		0	0
Horsens	Total		0	0	0	0	-	-	-	-	0	0
Career total			216	42	12	2	-	-	-	-	228	44
