= Ahmed El Amrani =

Norwegian footballer (born 1992)

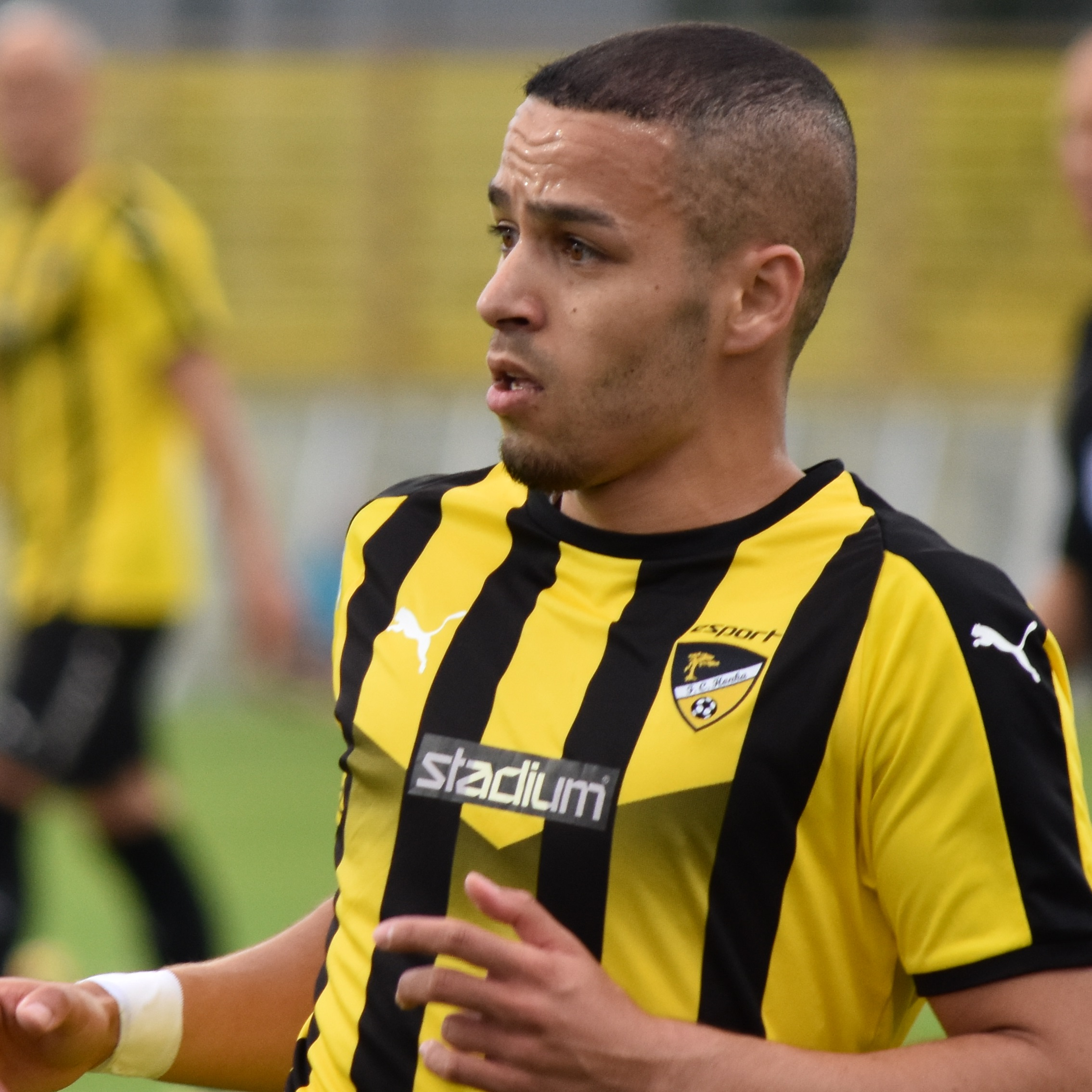
- El-Amrani with FC Honka in 2018.

Personal information
- Full name: Ahmed El Amrani
- Date of birth: 16 February 1992 (age 34)
- Place of birth: Oslo, Norway
- Position: Defender

Team information
- Current team: Hønefoss
- Number: 8

Youth career
- –2010: Lyn
- 2011–2012: Vålerenga

Senior career*
Years	Team	Apps	(Gls)
2010	Lyn	1	(0)
2012	Skeid	3	(1)
2013–2014	Fyllingsdalen	50	(14)
2015–2016	Ljungskile SK	49	(9)
2017	Stabæk	8	(0)
2018	FC Honka	13	(0)
2019	Skeid	20	(0)
2021–	Hønefoss	71	(10)
- * Club domestic league appearances and goals as of 20:28, 9 March 2025 (UTC)

Ahmed El Amrani (born 16 February 1992) is a Norwegian footballer who currently plays for Hønefoss.

== Career ==
He started his youth career in Lyn, and played one first-team game in 2010 following the team's bankruptcy and degradation to the seventh tier of Norwegian football.

In 2018 he played for the Veikkausliiga side FC Honka, and in 2019 he returned to Oslo and Skeid.
