= Simen Lillevik Kjellevold =

Norwegian footballer (born 1994)

Simen Lillevik
Personal information
- Full name: Simen Lillevik Kjellevold
- Date of birth: 7 November 1994 (age 32)
- Place of birth: Stryn Municipality, Norway
- Height: 1.87 m (6 ft 2 in)
- Position: Goalkeeper

Team information
- Current team: Eidsvold Turn
- Number: 1

Youth career
- Vikane

Senior career*
Years	Team	Apps	(Gls)
2010–2011	Vikane		
2012–2015	Stryn		
2016	Førde	1	(0)
2016–2019	Stabæk	2	(0)
2017	→ Kongsvinger (loan)	12	(0)
2020–2022	Strømmen	59	(0)
2022	Grorud	30	(0)
2023	KR	17	(0)
2024–2025	Åsane	22	(0)
2025–	Eidsvold Turn	39	(0)
- * Club domestic league appearances and goals as of 15 November 2026

Simen Lillevik Kjellevold (born 7 November 1994) is a Norwegian professional footballer who plays as a goalkeeper for Eidsvold Turn.

== Career ==
Hailing from Innvik, he started his youth career in Vikane IL and was promoted into the senior team (on the seventh tier) for the 2010 season. In 2012 he joined local spearheads Stryn TIL.

In 2016 he moved on to Førde IL, only to be snapped up by Stabæk Fotball in the summer of 2016. He pocketed a single league game for Førde. Bought as a future prospect, but at the moment being the third-choice goalkeeper, he was loaned out to Kongsvinger IL Toppfotball in the first half of 2017. He made his first-team debut for Stabæk in the 2018 Norwegian Football Cup and league debut in November 2018 following the injury of Marcus Sandberg.
