= Jeppe Moe =

Norwegian footballer (born 1995)

Jeppe Arctander Moe
Personal information
- Date of birth: 3 August 1995 (age 31)
- Place of birth: Bærum, Norway
- Height: 1.85 m (6 ft 1 in)
- Position: Defender

Youth career
- Fossum
- –2014: Stabæk
- 2014–2015: Stetson Hatters

Senior career*
Years	Team	Apps	(Gls)
2016–2022	Stabæk	107	(1)
2022–2023	Aalesund	12	(0)
- * Club domestic league appearances and goals

Jeppe Arctander Moe (born 3 August 1995) is a Norwegian former professional footballer who played as a defender.

Jeppe Arctander Moe began his career in his local club Fossum IF but later got picked up by Stabæk at the age of 13. After a successful stint in Stabæk's boys and junior teams, he moved to Florida to study at Stetson University from the autumn of 2014 on a sports scholarship.

In 2016, he returned to Stabæk and signed a one-year contract with the senior team. After featuring in the early rounds of the 2016 Norwegian Football Cup, Moe made his league debut in May 2016 as a substitute against Rosenborg BK.

He grabbed his first Stabæk goal in a 7–1 victory against Sparta Sarpsborg in the Norwegian Cup when he finished a short pass from teammate Ohi Omoijuanfo in the bottom corner in the 76th minute.

He came on as a substitute against Viking FK on 12 May 2016, to get his home debut at Nadderud Stadion in the 80th minute in a 1–0 victory.

On 21 May he played his first full 90 minutes against Tromsø, but Stabæk suffered a 0–3 defeat.

== Career statistics ==
As of 4 May 2023

Club	Season	Division	League		Cup		Total	
Club	Season	Division	Apps	Goals	Apps	Goals	Apps	Goals
Stabæk	2016	Tippeligaen	17	0	4	1	21	1
Stabæk	2017	Eliteserien	26	0	2	0	28	0
Stabæk	2018	Eliteserien	29	0	2	1	31	1
Stabæk	2019	Eliteserien	19	0	1	0	20	0
Stabæk	2020	Eliteserien	0	0	0	0	0	0
Stabæk	2021	Eliteserien	16	1	1	0	17	1
Aalesund	2022	Eliteserien	8	0	2	0	10	0
Aalesund	2023	Eliteserien	4	0	0	0	4	0
Career total			119	1	12	2	131	3
