= Tortol Lumanza =

Belgian footballer (born 1994)

Personal information
- Full name: Tortol Lumanza Lembi
- Date of birth: 13 April 1994 (age 32)
- Place of birth: Antwerp, Belgium
- Height: 1.78 m (5 ft 10 in)
- Position: Central midfielder

Youth career
- ?–2010: Beerschot AC
- 2010–2013: Standard Liège

Senior career*
| Years | Team | Apps | (Gls) |
| 2013–2015 | Standard Liège | 21 | (0) |
| 2013–2014 | → Sint-Truiden | 24 | (3) |
| 2015–2016 | Waasland-Beveren | 1 | (0) |
| 2017–2018 | Stabæk | 28 | (2) |
| 2018–2019 | Osmanlıspor | 45 | (1) |
| 2019–2022 | Stabæk | 40 | (0) |
| 2023 | Hønefoss | 26 | (5) |

International career
| 2010 | Belgium U16 | 6 | (0) |
| 2010–2011 | Belgium U17 | 13 | (0) |
| 2012 | Belgium U18 | 2 | (0) |
| 2012 | Belgium U19 | 4 | (0) |
- * Club domestic league appearances and goals

Tortol Lumanza Lembi (born 13 April 1994) is a Belgian former professional footballer who played as a central midfielder.

== Club career ==
Born in Antwerp, Lumanza joined Standard Liège in 2010 from Beerschot AC. During the 2013–14 season, he was loaned out to second division side Sint-Truiden. On 25 July 2014, he made his Belgian Pro League debut with Standard Liège against Charleroi. After a period without a club he joined Stabæk Fotball, a Tippeligaen team, in 2017.

== International career ==
Lumanza was born in Belgium and is of Congolese descent. He is a former youth international for Belgium.
