= 2016 Strømmen IF season =

Strømmen
2016 season
- Chairman: Jan Ove Molle
- Manager: Espen Olsen
- Stadium: Strømmen Stadion
- OBOS-ligaen: 7th
- Norwegian Cup: Third round vs Kongsvinger
- Top goalscorer: League: Stian Rasch & Martin Trøen (7); All: Three Players (7)

The 2016 season was Strømmen's 7th consecutive year in OBOS-ligaen and their second with Espen Olsen as manager.

== Squad ==
As of 3 April 2016

Note: Flags indicate national team as defined under FIFA eligibility rules; some limited exceptions apply. Players may hold more than one non-FIFA nationality.

No.	Pos.	Nation	Player
1	GK	NOR	Tarjei Omenås
2	DF	NOR	Markus Nakkim (on loan from Vålerenga)
3	DF	DEN	Thor Lange
4	DF	NOR	Kristian Jahr
5	DF	NOR	Steinar Strømnes
6	DF	NOR	Fredrik Nilsen
7	MF	NOR	Olav Øby (on loan from Sarpsborg 08)
8	MF	NOR	Mathias Blårud
9	MF	NOR	Markus Brændsrød (on loan from Lillestrøm)
10	FW	NOR	Mustapha Achrifi
11	FW	NOR	Nasir Dernjani

No.	Pos.	Nation	Player
12	GK	NOR	Stian Bolstad
14	MF	NOR	Ulrich Ness
16	MF	NOR	Espen Rødsand
17	MF	NOR	Kristian Emil Bjørndalen
19	DF	SWE	Viktor Adebahr
20	MF	NOR	Aleksander Melgalvis
21	DF	NOR	Johannes Grødtlien
22	FW	NOR	Ole Marius Aasen
23	DF	NOR	Pål Steffen Andresen
82	FW	SEN	Madiou Konate
88	MF	NOR	Stian Rasch

== Competitions ==
=== OBOS-ligaen ===
==== Results summary ====
Overall								Home						Away					
Pld	W	D	L	GF	GA	GD	Pts	W	D	L	GF	GA	GD	W	D	L	GF	GA	GD
30	13	8	9	46	45	+1	47	9	4	2	24	16	+8	4	4	7	22	29	−7

==== Results by round ====
Round	1	2	3	4	5	6	7	8	9	10	11	12	13	14	15	16	17	18	19	20	21	22	23	24	25	26	27	28	29	30
Ground	A	H	A	H	A	H	A	H	A	H	H	A	H	A	H	A	A	H	A	H	A	H	A	H	A	H	A	H	A	H
Result	L	D	D	D	D	W	W	W	L	D	L	D	W	L	W	W	L	W	L	W	D	W	W	D	L	W	L	L	W	W
Position	15	15	14	13	14	9	7	6	8	8	9	10	8	10	9	6	8	6	9	8	8	7	6	6	7	7	7	8	8	7

Updated to match(es) played on 30 October 2016. Source: see below
A = Away; H = Home; W = Win; D = Draw; L = Loss

==== Results ====
3 April 2016 1	Sandefjord	4–1	Strømmen	Sandefjord
18:00 CEST (UTC+2)	Kovács 2'; Mjelde 5'; Sødlund 77'; Sellin 80'	Report	Øby 26'; Blårud (yellow card) 44'; Melgalvis (yellow card) 61'	Stadium: Komplett Arena; Attendance: 3,278; Referee: Bjørn Hansen

10 April 2016 2	Strømmen	0–0	Fredrikstad	Strømmen
15:30 CEST (UTC+2)	Ness (yellow card) 88'	Report		Stadium: Strømmen Stadion; Attendance: 1,038; Referee: Steinar Hauge

17 April 2016 3	Mjøndalen	1–1	Strømmen	Nedre Eiker
18:00 CEST (UTC+2)	Pellegrino 2'; Gundersen (yellow card) 54'	Report	Melgalvis (yellow card) 18', (goal) 19'; Aasen (yellow card) 70'	Stadium: Isachsen Stadion; Attendance: 1,821; Referee: Ole Johnny Løfald

24 April 2016 4	Strømmen	0–0	Åsane	Strømmen
18:00 CEST (UTC+2)		Report		Stadium: Strømmen Stadion; Attendance: 282; Referee: Bjørn Hansen

1 May 2016 5	Jerv	2–2	Strømmen	Grimstad
18:00 CEST (UTC+2)	Antwi 31'; Jenssen (yellow card) 56'; Myhre 59'	Report	Melgalvis 8'; Strømnes 16'; Blårud (yellow card) 53'; Nilsen (yellow card) 68'	Stadium: Levermyr Stadion; Attendance: 925; Referee: Anders Gjermshus

8 May 2016 6	Strømmen	2–1	Hødd	Strømmen
18:00 CEST (UTC+2)	Achrifi 28'; Rasch 37'	Report	Wembangomo (yellow card) 53'; Andersen 55'; Wrele (yellow card) 88'	Stadium: Strømmen Stadion; Attendance: 383; Referee: Torkjell Trædal

12 May 2016 7	KFUM Oslo	1–3	Strømmen	Oslo
19:00 CEST (UTC+2)	Dahl 17'	Report	Rasch 9', 68'; Konate 70'	Stadium: KFUM Arena; Attendance: 402; Referee: Sivert Amland

16 May 2016 8	Strømmen	2–1	Kongsvinger	Strømmen
18:00 CEST (UTC+2)	Lange 3'; Achrifi 19'	Report	Ellingsen 26'	Stadium: Strømmen Stadion; Attendance: 827; Referee: Steinar Hauge

22 May 2016 9	Ranheim	4–1	Strømmen	Trondheim
18:00 CEST (UTC+2)	Kvande 17'; Stene 40' (pen.), 76'; Gjertsen 52'	Report	Rasch 10'	Stadium: Ranheim Arena; Attendance: 791; Referee: Jan Morten Tennøy

29 May 2016 10	Strømmen	2–2	Bryne	Strømmen
18:00 CEST (UTC+2)	Blårud 45'; Øby 48'	Report	Fjelde 51'; Grødem 55'	Stadium: Strømmen Stadion; Attendance: 316; Referee: Kristoffer Hagenes

5 June 2016 11	Strømmen	1–3	Kristiansund	Strømmen
18:00 CEST (UTC+2)	Ness 81'	Report	Bamba 33'; Diop 39', 89'	Stadium: Strømmen Stadion; Attendance: 326; Referee: Sigurd Kringstad

12 June 2016 12	Levanger	2–2	Strømmen	Levanger
18:00 CEST (UTC+2)	Stokke 21', 41'	Report	Aasen 50'; Rasch 90+1'	Stadium: Moan Kunstgress; Attendance: 769; Referee: Steinar Hauge

19 June 2016 13	Strømmen	3–1	Sandnes Ulf	Strømmen
18:00 CEST (UTC+2)	Rasch 9'; Brændsrød 38'; Melgalvis 57'	Report	Engblom 53'	Stadium: Strømmen Stadion; Attendance: 283; Referee: Sivert Amland

26 June 2016 14	Ull/Kisa	2–0	Strømmen	Jessheim
18:00 CEST (UTC+2)	Ødemarksbakken 32'; Henriksen 78'	Report		Stadium: Jessheim Stadion; Attendance: 550; Referee: Rohit Saggi

29 June 2016 15	Strømmen	4–0	Raufoss	Strømmen
19:00 CEST (UTC+2)	Aasen 7'; Melgalvis 21'; Øby 78'; Brændsrød 90+2'	Report		Stadium: Strømmen Stadion; Attendance: 506; Referee: Mads Skarsem

3 July 2016 16	Bryne	0–1	Strømmen	Bryne
18:00 CEST (UTC+2)		Report	Wemberg 74' (o.g.)	Stadium: Bryne Stadion; Attendance: 1,182; Referee: Bjørn Hansen

10 July 2016 17	Sandnes Ulf	1–0	Strømmen	Sandnes
18:00 CEST (UTC+2)	Eriksen 88'	Report		Stadium: Sandnes Stadion; Attendance: 1,455; Referee: Kristoffer Hagenes

31 July 2016 18	Strømmen	2–1	Levanger	Strømmen
18:00 CEST (UTC+2)	Trøen 70', 71'	Report	Hopen 37'	Stadium: Strømmen Stadion; Attendance: 417; Referee: Jan Morten Tennøy

7 August 2016 19	Kristiansund	2–0	Strømmen	Kristiansund
18:00 CEST (UTC+2)	Mendy 18'; Bamba 82'	Report		Stadium: Kristiansund Stadion; Attendance: 1,766; Referee: Bjørn Hansen

14 August 2016 20	Strømmen	2–1	Ranheim	Strømmen
18:00 CEST (UTC+2)	Melgalvis 63'; Aasen 88'	Report	Stene 56'	Stadium: Strømmen Stadion; Attendance: 326

21 August 2016 21	Kongsvinger	2–2	Strømmen	Kongsvinger
18:00 CEST (UTC+2)	Suslov 17'; Niang 90+3'	Report	Jahr 36'; Trøen 56'	Stadium: Gjemselund Stadion; Attendance: 1,460; Referee: Sigurd Kringstad

24 August 2016 22	Strømmen	2–1	KFUM Oslo	Strømmen
18:00 CEST (UTC+2)	Trøen 48'; Achrifi 65'	Report	Wiig 61'	Stadium: Strømmen Stadion; Attendance: 399; Referee: Rohit Saggi

28 August 2016 23	Raufoss	4–5	Strømmen	Raufoss
15:00 CEST (UTC+2)	Næss 18'; Krug 48'; Dadjo 84'; Jones 90+2'	Report	Achrifi 10' (pen.); Blårud 23'; Melgalvis 34' (pen.); Trøen 44', 67'	Stadium: Raufoss Stadion; Attendance: 717; Referee: Kristoffer Hagenes

11 September 2016 24	Strømmen	0–0	Mjøndalen	Strømmen
15:30 CEST (UTC+2)		Report		Stadium: Strømmen Stadion; Attendance: 888; Referee: Torkjell Trædal

19 September 2016 25	Fredrikstad	2–1	Strømmen	Fredrikstad
19:00 CEST (UTC+2)	Begby 27'; Kapidžić 54'	Report	Ness 41'	Stadium: Fredrikstad Stadion; Attendance: 7,832; Referee: Rohit Saggi

25 September 2016 26	Strømmen	2–1	Ull/Kisa	Strømmen
15:00 CEST (UTC+2)	Mickels 56'; Dernjani 78'	Report	Falkeborn 89'	Stadium: Strømmen Stadion; Attendance: 813; Referee: Bjørn Hansen

2 October 2016 27	Åsane	2–0	Strømmen	Bergen
15:00 CEST (UTC+2)	Hammersland 6'; Nygard 14'	Report		Stadium: Myrdal Gress; Attendance: 482; Referee: Mohammed Aslam

16 October 2016 28	Strømmen	0–3	Sandefjord	Strømmen
15:00 CEST (UTC+2)		Report	Mjelde 83'; Sellin 90+2', 90+5'	Stadium: Strømmen Stadion; Attendance: 1,265; Referee: Mads Skarsem

23 October 2016 29	Hødd	0–3	Strømmen	Ulsteinvik
13:00 CEST (UTC+2)		Report	Strømnes 14'; Brændsrød 50', 68'	Stadium: Høddvoll Stadion; Attendance: 2,020; Referee: Sivert Amland

30 October 2016 30	Strømmen	2–1	Jerv	Strømmen
13:00 CET (UTC+1)	Trøen 12'; Rasch 86'	Report	Andersen 51' (pen.)	Stadium: Strømmen Stadion; Attendance: 409; Referee: Kim Rune Borgersen

==== Table ====
Pos	Team	Pld	W	D	L	GF	GA	GD	Pts	Promotion, qualification or relegation
5	Kongsvinger	30	14	7	9	56	42	+14	49	Qualification for the promotion play-offs
6	Mjøndalen	30	13	10	7	49	38	+11	49	Qualification for the promotion play-offs
7	Strømmen	30	13	8	9	46	45	+1	47	
8	Levanger	30	13	6	11	52	46	+6	45	
9	Ranheim	30	11	6	13	45	48	−3	39	

Source: nifs.no (in Norwegian), Soccerway
Rules for classification: 1) Points; 2) Goal difference; 3) Goals scored; 4) Head-to-head points; 5) Head-to-head goal difference; 6) Head-to-head away goals scored (only if between two teams); 7) Head-to-head goals scored; 8) Play-off (only used to decide champions or relegation).

=== Norwegian Cup ===
13 April 2016 First Round	Skeid	1–3	Strømmen	Oslo
18:00 CEST (UTC+2)	Hassan 27'; Bergersen (yellow card) 55'; Lysgård (red card) 74'	Report	Konate 22' (pen.); Adebahr (yellow card) 59'; Brændsrød 61', 79'	Stadium: Nordre Åsen; Attendance: 150; Referee: Ali Iqbal Tahir

27 April 2016 Second Round	Strømmen	3–1	Notodden	Strømmen
18:00 CEST (UTC+2)	Melgalvis 29'; Nakkim 49'; Rødsand 55'	Report	Velta 8' (pen.)	Stadium: Strømmen Stadion; Attendance: 206; Referee: Ajdin Medic

4 May 2016 Third Round	Kongsvinger	1–1 (a.e.t.) (4–3 p)	Strømmen	Kongsvinger
18:00 CEST (UTC+2)	Suslov (yellow card) 34'; Maikel (yellow card) 48', (goal) 77'; Nystuen (yellow card) 99'	Report	Øby 20'; Rødsand (yellow card) 52'; Achrifi (yellow card) 84'; Brændrød (yellow card) 120'	Stadium: Gjemselund Stadion; Attendance: 1,151; Referee: Martin Lundby
	Penalties
	Maikel (penalty missed); Güven (penalty scored); Moldskred (penalty scored); Ellingsen (penalty scored); Sotiroglou (penalty scored)		(penalty missed) Konate; (penalty missed) Achrifi; (penalty scored) Nakkim; (penalty scored) Melgalvis

== Squad statistics ==
=== Playing statistics ===
As of 8 May 2016

Appearances (Apps.) numbers are for appearances in competitive games only including sub appearances
Red card numbers denote: Numbers in parentheses represent red cards overturned for wrongful dismissal.

No.	Nat.	Player	Pos.	OBOS-ligaen				Norwegian Cup				Total			
No.	Nat.	Player	Pos.	Apps	Goal	Yellow card	Red card	Apps	Goal	Yellow card	Red card	Apps	Goal	Yellow card	Red card
1	(Sweden)	Tarjei Omenås	GK	6				1				7			
2	(Norway)	Markus Nakkim	DF	6				3	1			9	1		
3	(Denmark)	Thor Lange	DF	5				2				7			
4	(Norway)	Kristian Jahr	DF												
5	(Norway)	Steinar Strømnes	DF	6	1			2				8	1		
6	(Norway)	Fredrik Nilsen	DF	2		1		2				4		1	
7	(Norway)	Olav Øby	MF	6	1			3	1			9	2		
8	(Norway)	Mathias Blårud	MF	5		2		3				8		2	
9	(Norway)	Markus Brændsrød	MF	5				2	2			7	2		
10	(Norway)	Mustapha Achrifi	FW	6	1			3		1		9	1	1	
11	(Norway)	Nasir Dernjani	FW	6				3				9			
12	(Norway)	Stian Bolstad	GK					2				2			
14	(Norway)	Ulrich Ness	MF	5		1		1				6		1	
16	(Norway)	Espen Rødsand	MF	4				3	1	1		7	1	1	
17	(Norway)	Kristian Emil Bjørndalen	MF	1								1			
19	(Sweden)	Viktor Adebahr	DF	2				3		1		5		1	
20	(Norway)	Aleksander Melgalvis	MF	6	2	2		2	1			8	3	2	
21	(Norway)	Johannes Grødtlien	DF					1							
22	(Norway)	Ole Marius Aasen	FW	4		1						4		1	
23	(Norway)	Pål Steffen Andresen	DF	1								1			
82	(Senegal)	Madiou Konate	FW	3				1	1			4	1		
88	(Norway)	Stian Rasch	MF	5	1			2				7	1		
Totals					6	7	0		7	3	0		13	10	0

=== Goal scorers ===
No.	Nat.	Player	Pos.	OBOS-ligaen	Norwegian Cup	TOTAL
2	(Norway)	Markus Nakkim	DF	0	1	1
5	(Norway)	Steinar Strømnes	DF	1	0	1
7	(Norway)	Olav Øby	MF	1	1	2
9	(Norway)	Markus Brændsrød	FW	0	2	2
10	(Norway)	Mustapha Achrifi	MF	1	0	1
16	(Norway)	Espen Rødsand	MF	0	1	1
20	(Norway)	Aleksander Melgalvis	DF	2	1	3
82	(Senegal)	Madiou Konate	FW	0	1	1
88	(Norway)	Stian Rasch	FW	1	0	1
Own Goals				0	0	0
Totals				6	7	13

=== Assists ===
No.	Nat.	Player	Pos.	OBOS-ligaen	Norwegian Cup	TOTAL
3	(Norway)	Thor Lange	DF	0	1	1
10	(Norway)	Mustapha Achrifi	MF	2	1	3
11	(Norway)	Nasir Dernjani	FW	0	1	1
19	(Norway)	Viktor Adebahr	DF	1	0	1
88	(Norway)	Stian Rasch	MF	1	0	1
Totals				4	3	7
