= 2019 Stabæk Fotball season =

Stabæk
2019 season
- Chairman: Espen Moe
- Manager: Henning Berg (until 6 June); Jan Jönsson (from 11 June)
- Stadium: Nadderud Stadion
- Eliteserien: 8th
- Norwegian Cup: Fourth Round vs Viking
- Top goalscorer: League: Three Players (6); All: Franck Boli (8)
Home colours	Away colours

The 2019 season was Stabæk's sixth season back in the Eliteserien following their relegation in 2012 and their 23rd season in the top flight of Norwegian football. Stabæk finished the season in 8th position and were knocked out of the Norwegian Cup by Viking in the Fourth Round.

== Season events ==
On 6 June, manager Henning Berg left the club to become manager of AC Omonia, with Jan Jönsson being announced as his replacement on 11 June. |15th

== Squad ==
As of match played 1 December 2019

No.	Name	Nationality	Position	Date of birth (age)	Signed from	Signed in	Contract ends	Apps.	Goals
Goalkeepers
1	Simen Kjellevold	(Norway)	GK	7 November 1994 (aged 25)	Førde	2016		4	0
12	Marcus Sandberg	(Sweden)	GK	7 November 1990 (aged 29)	Vålerenga	2018		47	0
84	Jonas Brauti	(Norway)	GK	14 May 1999 (aged 20)	Ullern	2019		0	0
Defenders
2	Ronald Hernández	(Venezuela)	DF	21 September 1997 (aged 22)	Zamora	2017		61	0
3	Yaw Ihle Amankwah	(Norway)	DF	7 July 1988 (aged 31)	Hobro	2019		15	1
4	Vadim Demidov	(Norway)	DF	10 October 1986 (aged 33)	Minnesota United	2018		43	1
5	Steinar Strømnes	(Norway)	DF	19 March 1987 (aged 32)	Strømmen	2018		22	0
16	Andreas Hanche-Olsen	(Norway)	DF	17 January 1997 (aged 22)	Youth Team	2016		109	4
18	Jeppe Moe	(Norway)	DF	3 August 1995 (aged 24)	Youth Team	2016		106	1
27	Nicolas Jenssen	(Norway)	DF	12 January 2002 (aged 17)	Youth Team	2019		1	0
28	Sun Jie	(China)	DF	9 February 1991 (aged 28)	loan from Changchun Yatai	2019		3	0
30	Peder Vogt	(Norway)	DF	6 April 2000 (aged 19)	Youth Team	2019		5	0
Midfielders
6	Luc Kassi	(Ivory Coast)	MF	20 August 1994 (aged 25)		2012		182	40
8	Emil Bohinen	(Norway)	MF	12 March 1999 (aged 20)	Youth Team	2017		49	4
10	Youssef Toutouh	(Denmark)	MF	6 October 1992 (aged 27)	loan from AGF	2019	2019	7	0
13	Younes Amer	(Norway)	MF	13 March 2001 (aged 18)	Nordstrand	2019		0	0
14	Kristoffer Askildsen	(Norway)	MF	9 January 2001 (aged 18)	Youth Team	2018		17	1
20	Ola Brynhildsen	(Norway)	MF	13 March 1999 (aged 20)	Youth Team	2017		65	11
22	Sammy Skytte	(Denmark)	MF	20 February 1997 (aged 22)	loan from Midtjylland	2019	2019	13	1
23	Oliver Edvardsen	(Norway)	MF	19 March 1999 (aged 20)	Grorud	2019		8	2
25	Hugo Vetlesen	(Norway)	MF	29 February 2000 (aged 19)	Youth Team	2017		86	2
67	Tortol Lumanza	(Belgium)	MF	13 April 1994 (aged 25)	Osmanlıspor	2019		43	3
88	Herman Geelmuyden	(Norway)	MF	28 June 1990 (aged 29)	Youth Team	2019		1	9
Forwards
7	Raymond Gyasi	(Ghana)	FW	5 August 1994 (aged 25)	Cambuur	2017		26	4
9	Sindre Mauritz-Hansen	(Norway)	FW	18 October 1994 (aged 25)	Asker	2017		7	6
11	Matthew Rusike	(Zimbabwe)	FW	28 June 1990 (aged 29)	Cape Town City	2019		3	0
17	Daniel Braaten	(Norway)	FW	25 May 1982 (aged 37)	Brann	2019		22	3
19	Kosuke Kinoshita	(Japan)	FW	3 October 1994 (aged 25)	Sint-Truidense	2019	2019	9	0
21	Kasper Junker	(Denmark)	FW	5 March 1994 (aged 25)	loan from Horsens	2019	2019	12	6
Out on loan
	Filip Valenčič	(Slovenia)	MF	7 January 1992 (aged 27)	HJK	2018		6	0
29	Oscar Aga	(Norway)	FW	6 January 2001 (aged 18)	Youth Team	2018		14	5
Left During the Season
3	Nikolaj Kirk	(Denmark)	DF	19 March 1998 (aged 21)	loan from Midtjylland	2019	2019	6	0
10	Franck Boli	(Ivory Coast)	FW	7 December 1993 (aged 25)	Asker	2017		157	61
21	Madis Vihmann	(Estonia)	DF	5 October 1995 (aged 24)	loan from Flora	2019		17	2
22	Alexander Torvund	(Hungary)	FW	1 August 2000 (aged 19)	Ullern	2019		0	0
42	Tobias Børkeeiet	(Norway)	MF	18 April 1999 (aged 20)	Youth Team	2018		44	1
77	Youness Mokhtar	(Morocco)	MF	22 January 2002 (aged 17)	Youth Team	2019		3	1

== Transfers ==
=== In ===
Date	Position	Nationality	Name	From	Fee	Ref.
10 January 2019	GK	(Norway)	Jonas Brauti	Ullern	Undisclosed	
14 January 2019	FW	(Hungary)	Alexander Torvund	Ullern	Undisclosed	
16 January 2019	MF	(Norway)	Younes Amer	Nordstrand	Undisclosed	
21 February 2019	FW	(Norway)	Daniel Braaten	Brann	Undisclosed	
11 March 2019	FW	(Zimbabwe)	Matthew Rusike	Cape Town City	Undisclosed	
25 June 2019	DF	(Norway)	Yaw Ihle Amankwah	Hobro	Undisclosed	
22 July 2019	FW	(Japan)	Kosuke Kinoshita	Sint-Truiden	Undisclosed	
30 July 2019	MF	(Belgium)	Tortol Lumanza	Osmanlıspor	Undisclosed	

=== Loans in ===
Date from	Position	Nationality	Name	From	Date to	Ref.
16 March 2019	DF	(Estonia)	Madis Vihmann	Flora	25 July 2019	
29 March 2019	DF	(China)	Sun Jie	Changchun Yatai		
31 March 2019	DF	(Denmark)	Nikolaj Kirk	Midtjylland	25 July 2019	
8 July 2019	MF	(Denmark)	Sammy Skytte	Midtjylland	End of Season	
9 August 2019	FW	(Denmark)	Kasper Junker	Horsens	End of Season	
19 August 2019	MF	(Denmark)	Youssef Toutouh	AGF	End of Season	

=== Out ===
Date	Position	Nationality	Name	To	Fee	Ref.
Winter 2018	DF	(Norway)	Daniel Granli	AIK	Undisclosed	
Winter 2018	MF	(Norway)	Moussa Njie	Partizan Belgrade	Undisclosed	
Winter 2018	MF	(Norway)	John Hou Sæter	Beijing Sinobo Guoan	Undisclosed	
Winter 2018	FW	(Norway)	Abdul-Basit Agouda	KFUM	Undisclosed	
21 March 2019	FW	(Norway)	Ohi Omoijuanfo	Molde	Undisclosed	
5 July 2019	MF	(Norway)	Tobias Børkeeiet	Brøndby	Undisclosed	
1 August 2019	FW	(Ivory Coast)	Franck Boli	Ferencvárosi	Undisclosed	

=== Loans out ===
Date from	Position	Nationality	Name	to	Date to	Ref.
15 February 2019	MF	(Slovenia)	Filip Valenčič	Inter Turku	December 2019	
29 August 2019	FW	(Norway)	Oscar Aga	Grorud	End of Season	

=== Released ===
Date	Position	Nationality	Name	Joined	Date
3 January 2019	DF	(Norway)	Håkon Skogseid	Retired|	
3 June 2019	MF	(Morocco)	Youness Mokhtar	Columbus Crew	19 July 2019
1 December 2019	DF	(Norway)	Vadim Demidov	Retired|	

== Competitions ==
=== Eliteserien ===
==== Results summary ====
Overall								Home						Away					
Pld	W	D	L	GF	GA	GD	Pts	W	D	L	GF	GA	GD	W	D	L	GF	GA	GD
30	10	10	10	38	36	+2	40	5	7	3	20	14	+6	5	3	7	18	22	−4

Last updated: 1 December 2019.
Source: Results

==== Results by round ====
Round	1	2	3	4	5	6	7	8	9	10	11	12	13	14	15	16	17	18	19	20	21	22	23	24	25	26	27	28	29	30
Ground	H	A	H	A	H	A	H	A	H	A	H	A	A	H	A	H	H	H	A	H	A	H	A	H	A	H	A	A	H	A
Result	D	L	W	L	W	L	L	L	L	W	D	W	L	D	L	D	D	W	L	W	D	L	D	D	W	D	W	W	W	D
Position	7	14	10	12	10	11	13	13	14	14	16	15	15	12	12	12	13	12	12	12	11	11	11	11	10	10	10	9	8	8

Updated to match(es) played on 1 December 2019. Source: see below
A = Away; H = Home; W = Win; D = Draw; L = Loss

==== Results ====
1 April 2019 1	Stabæk	1–1	Lillestrøm	Bærum
19:00 CEST (UTC+2)	Boli 45+1'	Report	Olsen 45' (penalty missed) 52'	Stadium: Nadderud Stadion; Attendance: 4,031; Referee: Svein Oddvar Moen

7 April 2019 2	Molde	3–0	Stabæk	Molde
18:00 CEST (UTC+2)	Eikrem 32'; Omoijuanfo 38'; Moström 81'	Report	Boli (yellow card) 79'	Stadium: Aker Stadion; Attendance: 6,372; Referee: Tom Harald Hagen

14 April 2019 3	Stabæk	3–1	Rosenborg	Bærum
18:00 CEST (UTC+2)	Bohinen 29'; Brynhildsen 56'; Boli 67'	Report	Søderlund (yellow card) 22'; Reginiussen 41'; Hovland (yellow card) 55'	Stadium: Nadderud Stadion; Attendance: 4,521; Referee: Trond Ivar Døvle

22 April 2019 4	Haugesund	3–0	Stabæk	Haugesund
18:00 CEST (UTC+2)	Bergqvist (yellow card) 22' (goal) 24'; Stølås 73'; Samuelsen 84'	Report	Demidov (yellow card) 40' (yellow-red card) 43'; Vihmann (yellow card) 71'; Kirk (yellow card) 90+2'	Stadium: Haugesund Stadion; Attendance: 4,020; Referee: Rohit Saggi

28 April 2019 5	Stabæk	2–0	Bodø/Glimt	Bærum
18:00 CEST (UTC+2)	Vihmann (yellow card) 9'; Boli 22', 25' (pen.); Bohinen (yellow card) 70'	Report	Zinckernagel (yellow card) 53'	Stadium: Nadderud Stadion; Attendance: 3,531; Referee: Kristoffer Hagenes

4 May 2019 6	Mjøndalen	1–0	Stabæk	Mjøndalen
18:00 CEST (UTC+2)	Gauseth (yellow card) 19'; Jansen (yellow card) 63'; Liseth 90+3'	Report	Brynhildsen (yellow card) 38'	Stadium: Consto Arena; Attendance: 2,236; Referee: Tore Hansen

12 May 2019 7	Stabæk	0–1	Brann	Bærum
20:00 CEST (UTC+2)	Strømnes (yellow card) 72'	Report	Berisha 21'; Ordagić (yellow card) 60'; Løkberg (yellow card) 79'; Jenssen (yellow card) 90+3'	Stadium: Nadderud Stadion; Attendance: 3,942; Referee: Tom Harald Hagen

16 May 2019 8	Viking	3–0	Stabæk	Stavanger
18:00 CEST (UTC+2)	Pereira (yellow card) 17'; Tripić (yellow card) 27'; Bytyqi (yellow card) 28' (goal) 65'; Høiland (yellow card) 31' (goal) 60' (pen.); Vevatne (yellow card) 42'; Thorstvedt 47'; Friðjónsson (yellow card) 80'	Report	Sandberg (yellow card) 27'; Børkeeiet (yellow card) 29' (yellow-red card) 55'; Bohinen (yellow card) 45'	Stadium: Viking Stadion; Attendance: 15,029; Referee: Tore Hansen

17 June 2019 11	Stabæk	0–1	Tromsø	Bærum
19:00 CEST (UTC+2)	Aga (yellow card) 45+1'; Kassi (penalty missed) 86'	Report	Pirinen (yellow card) 38'; Taylor 76'	Stadium: Nadderud Stadion; Attendance: 3,682; Referee: Svein Oddvar Moen

23 June 2019 12	Kristiansund	0–1	Stabæk	Kristiansund
18:00 CEST (UTC+2)	Kastrati (penalty missed) 27'; Ulvestad (yellow card) 57'; Aasbak (yellow card) 62'; Coly (yellow card) 90+2'	Report	Boli 89' (pen.); Geelmuyden (yellow card) 90+2'	Stadium: Kristiansund Stadion; Attendance: 4,118; Referee: Sigurd Kringstad

30 June 2019 13	Stabæk	0–0	Ranheim	Bærum
18:00 CEST (UTC+2)	Kassi (yellow card) 38'; Demidov (yellow card) 78'; Hanche-Olsen (yellow card) 82'	Report	Reginiussen (yellow card) 66'	Stadium: Nadderud Stadion; Attendance: 3,256; Referee: Tom Harald Hagen

5 July 2019 14	Strømsgodset	0–2	Stabæk	Drammen
19:00 CEST (UTC+2)	Pellegrino (penalty missed) 7'	Report	Brynhildsen 14' (yellow card) 73'; Strømnes (yellow card) 32'; Hanche-Olsen (yellow card) 53'; Kassi 81'	Stadium: Marienlyst Stadion; Attendance: 5,078; Referee: Tommy Skjerven

10 July 2019 10	Odd	2–1	Stabæk	Skien
19:00 CEST (UTC+2)	Børven 10', 75' (pen.) (yellow card) 90+2'	Report	Braaten 13'; Hernández (yellow card) 58'	Stadium: Skagerak Arena; Attendance: 5,157; Referee: Dag Vidar Hafsås

15 July 2019 15	Stabæk	3–3	Sarpsborg 08	Bærum
19:00 CEST (UTC+2)	Kassi (yellow card) 26'; Boli 41' (penalty missed) 45+3'; Vihmann 68'; Bohinen 90+5'	Report	Lindseth 1'; Bateau (yellow card) 10'; Tveter 27'; Skålevik 50'; Vasyutin (yellow card) 90+6'	Stadium: Nadderud Stadion; Attendance: 3,321; Referee: Kristoffer Hagenes

21 July 2019 17	Brann	2–1	Stabæk	Bergen
18:00 CEST (UTC+2)	Jenssen 59'; Berisha 67'	Report	Braaten 81'	Stadium: Brann Stadion; Attendance: 9,049; Referee: Tom Harald Hagen

4 August 2019 16	Stabæk	1–1	Haugesund	Bærum
18:00 CEST (UTC+2)	Hanche-Olsen 49'	Report	Koné (yellow card) 48'; Leite (yellow card) 63'; Velde 69'; Kallevåg (yellow card) 73'	Stadium: Nadderud Stadion; Attendance: 3,153; Referee: Trond Ivar Døvle

14 August 2019 9	Stabæk	1–1	Vålerenga	Bærum
19:00 CEST (UTC+2)	Hanche-Olsen (yellow card) 38' (goal) 65'; Demidov (yellow card) 74'; Hernández (yellow card) 81'	Report	Dønnum (yellow card) 41'; George 48'; Bjørdal (yellow card) 57'; Borchgrevink (yellow card) 72'; Finne (yellow card) 82'; Vega (yellow card) 90+4'	Stadium: Nadderud Stadion; Attendance: 4,621; Referee: Kai Erik Steen

18 August 2019 18	Stabæk	2–0	Kristiansund	Bærum
16:00 CEST (UTC+2)	Junker 15'; Amankwah (yellow card) 36'; Hanche-Olsen (yellow card) 42'; Bohinen 80'	Report	Diop (yellow card) 75'	Stadium: Nadderud Stadion; Attendance: 3,831; Referee: Svein Oddvar Moen

24 August 2019 19	Rosenborg	3–2	Stabæk	Trondheim
18:00 CEST (UTC+2)	Søderlund 28'; Adegbenro 63'; Helland 75' (pen.) (yellow card) 86'	Report	Meling 8' (o.g.); Sandberg (yellow card) 75'; Toutouh (yellow card) 77'; Junker 82'	Stadium: Lerkendal Stadion; Attendance: 12,298; Referee: Tom Harald Hagen

31 August 2019 20	Stabæk	2–1	Strømsgodset	Bærum
18:00 CEST (UTC+2)	Brynhildsen 5'; Demidov (yellow card) 76'; Kassi 86'	Report	Ipalibo (yellow card) 23'; Salvesen 81'	Stadium: Nadderud Stadion; Attendance: 3,674; Referee: Kristoffer Hagenes

15 September 2019 21	Bodø/Glimt	3–3	Stabæk	Bodø
18:00 CEST (UTC+2)	Evjen 4'; Layouni (yellow card) 68' (goal) 84' (pen.); Bohinen 90+3'	Report	Brynhildsen 29'; Bohinen 43' (pen.) (yellow card) 90+4'; Amankwah (yellow card) 83'; Kassi 90+1'	Stadium: Aspmyra Stadion; Attendance: 3,569; Referee: Svein Oddvar Moen

23 September 2019 22	Stabæk	1–2	Molde	Bærum
19:00 CEST (UTC+2)	Kassi (yellow card) 8'; Vetlesen (yellow card) 83'; Edvardsen (yellow card) 85'; Amankwah (yellow card) 85'; Brynhildsen 90'; Junker (yellow card) 90+4'	Report	Eikrem (yellow card) 39'; James (yellow card) 45+1'; E.Hestad 53'; Omoijuanfo 69' (yellow card) 80' (yellow-red card) 80'; Aursnes (yellow card) 75'; Haugen (yellow card) 85'	Stadium: Nadderud Stadion; Attendance: 3,915; Referee: Trond Ivar Døvle

29 September 2019 23	Sarpsborg 08	0–0	Stabæk	Sarpsborg
18:00 CEST (UTC+2)	Halvorsen (yellow card) 73'	Report	Moe (yellow card) 70'; Skytte (yellow card) 79'	Stadium: Sarpsborg Stadion; Attendance: 4,971; Referee: Tommy Skjerven

6 October 2019 24	Stabæk	0–0	Viking	Bærum
18:00 CEST (UTC+2)	Bohinen (yellow card) 38'; Skytte (yellow card) 68'	Report	Hove (yellow card) 41'	Stadium: Nadderud Stadion; Attendance: 3,127; Referee: Sigurd Kringstad

19 October 2019 25	Vålerenga	0–2	Stabæk	Oslo
20:30 CEST (UTC+2)	Dønnum (yellow card) 57' (yellow-red card) 74'	Report	Skytte 6'; Kassi 17'	Stadium: Intility Arena; Attendance: 5,511; Referee: Tom Harald Hagen

27 October 2019 26	Stabæk	0–0	Odd	Bærum
18:00 CET (UTC+1)	Skytte (yellow card) 58'	Report	Berge (yellow card) 11'; Risa (yellow card) 34'	Stadium: Nadderud Stadion; Attendance: 3,082; Referee: Trond Ivar Døvle

3 November 2019 27	Ranheim	0–2	Stabæk	Trondheim
18:00 CET (UTC+1)	Heggem (yellow card) 3'; Karlsen (yellow card) 39'; Skarsem (yellow card) 40'; Foosnæs (yellow card) 86'	Report	Amankwah 61'; Heggem 78' (o.g.)	Stadium: EXTRA Arena; Attendance: 1,402; Referee: Rohit Saggi

10 November 2019 28	Lillestrøm	1–3	Stabæk	Lillestrøm
18:00 CET (UTC+1)	Tamm (yellow card) 1'; Marić (yellow card) 48'; Melgalvis 90+1'	Report	Brynhildsen 24'; Edvardsen 26'; Bohinen (penalty missed) 48'; Junker 64'	Stadium: Åråsen Stadion; Attendance: 4,650; Referee: Kai Erik Steen

24 November 2019 29	Stabæk	4–2	Mjøndalen	Bærum
18:00 CET (UTC+1)	Askildsen 18'; Junker 60', 63', 80' (yellow card) 73'	Report	Gauseth 22'; Dragsnes (yellow card) 39'; Brochmann 68'	Stadium: Nadderud Stadion; Attendance: 3,106; Referee: Tommy Skjerven

1 December 2019 30	Tromsø	1–1	Stabæk	Tromsø
18:00 CET (UTC+1)	Smith (yellow card) 27'; Espejord 47'	Report	Bohinen (yellow card) 36'; Edvardsen 39'; Askildsen (yellow card) 82'	Stadium: Alfheim Stadion; Attendance: 5,522; Referee: Tore Hansen

==== Table ====
Pos	Team	Pld	W	D	L	GF	GA	GD	Pts
6	Kristiansund	30	11	8	11	41	41	0	41
7	Haugesund	30	9	13	8	44	37	+7	40
8	Stabæk	30	10	10	10	38	36	+2	40
9	Brann	30	10	10	10	32	37	−5	40
10	Vålerenga	30	8	10	12	39	44	−5	34

Source: Football Association of Norway (in Norwegian), Soccerway
Rules for classification: 1) Points; 2) Goal difference; 3) Goals scored; 4) Head-to-head points; 5) Head-to-head goal difference; 6) Head-to-head away goals scored (only if between two teams); 7) Head-to-head goals scored; 8) Play-off (only used to decide champions or relegation).

=== Norwegian Cup ===
1 May 2019 First Round	Heming	1–3	Stabæk	Oslo
17:00 CEST (UTC+2)	E.Asplin (yellow card) 54'; O.Moe 90'	Report	Hanche-Olsen (yellow card) 13'; Aga 25', 55'; Vogt (yellow card) 73'; Mokhtar 83'	Stadium: Heming Kunstgress; Attendance: 1,200; Referee: Stian Røvig Sletner

21 May 2019 Second Round	Elverum	1–6	Stabæk	Elverum
18:00 CEST (UTC+2)	M.Solum 62'; Khattab (yellow card) 89'	Report	Kassi 2' (pen.); Vihmann 35'; Aga 57', 72', 90'; Geelmuyden 77'	Stadium: Elverum Stadion; Attendance: 652; Referee: Eivind Bodding

20 June 2019 Third Round	Alta	1–4	Stabæk	Alta
18:00 CEST (UTC+2)	Reginiussen 50' (yellow card) 78'	Report	Vetlesen 4'; Gyasi 75'; Boli 78' (pen.), 90'; Sun (yellow card) 79'	Stadium: Finnmarkshallen; Attendance: 622; Referee: Ajdin Medic

26 June 2019 Fourth Round	Viking	5–2	Stabæk	Stavanger
18:00 CEST (UTC+2)	Furdal 8'; Vikstøl 21'; Østensen 23'; Tripić (yellow card) 55'; Thorstvedt 84'; Høiland 86'	Report	Gyasi 10'; Braaten 18'; Boli (red card) 55'; Kassi (yellow card) 58'	Stadium: Viking Stadion; Attendance: 3,469; Referee: Rohit Saggi

== Squad statistics ==
As of match played 1 December 2019

=== Appearances and goals ===
No.	Pos	Nat	Player	Total		Eliteserien		Norwegian Cup	
No.	Pos	Nat	Player	Apps	Goals	Apps	Goals	Apps	Goals
1	GK	(Norway) NOR	Simen Kjellevold	1	0	0	0	1	0
2	DF	(Venezuela) VEN	Ronald Hernández	28	0	24+3	0	1	0
3	DF	(Norway) NOR	Yaw Ihle Amankwah	15	1	15	1	0	0
4	DF	(Norway) NOR	Vadim Demidov	15	0	15	0	0	0
5	DF	(Norway) NOR	Steinar Strømnes	15	0	11+2	0	2	0
6	MF	(Ivory Coast) CIV	Luc Kassi	26	5	18+5	4	3	1
7	FW	(Ghana) GHA	Raymond Gyasi	6	2	0+3	0	3	2
8	MF	(Norway) NOR	Emil Bohinen	31	4	27+2	4	2	0
10	MF	(Denmark) DEN	Youssef Toutouh	7	0	6+1	0	0	0
11	FW	(Zimbabwe) ZIM	Matthew Rusike	3	0	1+2	0	0	0
12	GK	(Sweden) SWE	Marcus Sandberg	33	0	30	0	3	0
14	MF	(Norway) NOR	Kristoffer Askildsen	16	1	11+3	1	1+1	0
16	DF	(Norway) NOR	Andreas Hanche-Olsen	33	2	29	2	4	0
17	FW	(Norway) NOR	Daniel Braaten	22	3	10+8	2	4	1
18	DF	(Norway) NOR	Jeppe Moe	20	0	19	0	1	0
19	FW	(Japan) JPN	Kosuke Kinoshita	9	0	2+7	0	0	0
20	MF	(Norway) NOR	Ola Brynhildsen	30	6	27+2	6	0+1	0
21	FW	(Denmark) DEN	Kasper Junker	12	6	11+1	6	0	0
22	MF	(Denmark) DEN	Sammy Skytte	13	1	13	1	0	0
23	MF	(Norway) NOR	Oliver Edvardsen	8	2	3+5	2	0	0
25	MF	(Norway) NOR	Hugo Vetlesen	27	1	16+8	0	1+2	1
27	DF	(Norway) NOR	Nicolas Pignatel Jenssen	1	0	0	0	0+1	0
28	DF	(China) CHN	Sun Jie	3	0	0	0	2+1	0
29	FW	(Norway) NOR	Oscar Aga	7	5	1+3	0	2+1	5
30	DF	(Norway) NOR	Peder Vogt	5	0	0+2	0	3	0
40	MF	(Norway) NOR	Magnus Lundal	1	0	0	0	1	0
67	MF	(Belgium) BEL	Tortol Lumanza	11	0	6+5	0	0	0
70	MF	(Norway) NOR	Kristian Arnstad	1	0	0	0	0+1	0
88	MF	(Norway) NOR	Herman Geelmuyden	9	1	0+5	0	3+1	1
Players away from Stabæk on loan:
Players who left Stabæk during the season:
3	DF	(Denmark) DEN	Nikolaj Kirk	6	0	1+3	0	1+1	0
10	FW	(Ivory Coast) CIV	Franck Boli	15	8	13	6	0+2	2
21	DF	(Estonia) EST	Madis Vihmann	17	2	11+3	1	3	1
42	MF	(Norway) NOR	Tobias Børkeeiet	12	0	9+1	0	2	0
77	MF	(Morocco) MAR	Youness Mokhtar	3	1	1+1	0	1	1

=== Goal scorers ===
Place	Position	Nation	Number	Name	Eliteserien	Norwegian Cup	Total
1	FW	(Ivory Coast)	10	Franck Boli	6	2	8
2	MF	(Norway)	20	Ola Brynhildsen	6	0	6
2	FW	(Denmark)	21	Kasper Junker	6	0	6
4	MF	(Ivory Coast)	6	Luc Kassi	4	1	5
4	FW	(Norway)	29	Oscar Aga	0	5	5
6	MF	(Norway)	8	Emil Bohinen	4	0	4
7	FW	(Norway)	17	Daniel Braaten	2	1	3
8	DF	(Norway)	16	Andreas Hanche-Olsen	2	0	2
8	FW	(Norway)	23	Oliver Edvardsen	2	0	2
8	DF	(Estonia)	21	Madis Vihmann	1	1	2
8	FW	(Ghana)	7	Raymond Gyasi	0	2	2
8				Own goal	2	0	2
13	MF	(Denmark)	22	Sammy Skytte	1	0	1
13	DF	(Norway)	3	Yaw Ihle Amankwah	1	0	1
13	MF	(Norway)	14	Kristoffer Askildsen	1	0	1
13	MF	(Morocco)	77	Youness Mokhtar	0	1	1
13	FW	(Norway)	88	Herman Geelmuyden	0	1	1
13	MF	(Norway)	25	Hugo Vetlesen	0	1	1
				TOTALS	38	15	53

=== Disciplinary record ===
Number	Nation	Position	Name	Eliteserien		Norwegian Cup		Total	
Number	Nation	Position	Name	Yellow card	Red card	Yellow card	Red card	Yellow card	Red card
2	(Venezuela)	DF	Ronald Hernández	2	0	0	0	2	0
3	(Norway)	DF	Yaw Ihle Amankwah	3	0	0	0	3	0
4	(Norway)	DF	Vadim Demidov	5	1	0	0	5	1
5	(Norway)	DF	Steinar Strømnes	2	0	0	0	2	0
6	(Ivory Coast)	MF	Luc Kassi	3	0	1	0	4	0
8	(Norway)	MF	Emil Bohinen	5	0	0	0	5	0
10	(Denmark)	MF	Youssef Toutouh	1	0	0	0	1	0
12	(Sweden)	GK	Marcus Sandberg	2	0	0	0	2	0
14	(Norway)	MF	Kristoffer Askildsen	1	0	0	0	1	0
16	(Norway)	DF	Andreas Hanche-Olsen	4	0	1	0	5	0
18	(Norway)	DF	Jeppe Moe	1	0	0	0	1	0
20	(Norway)	MF	Ola Brynhildsen	2	0	0	0	2	0
21	(Denmark)	FW	Kasper Junker	2	0	0	0	2	0
22	(Denmark)	MF	Sammy Skytte	3	0	0	0	3	0
23	(Norway)	MF	Oliver Edvardsen	1	0	0	0	1	0
25	(Norway)	MF	Hugo Vetlesen	1	0	0	0	1	0
28	(China)	DF	Sun Jie	0	0	1	0	1	0
29	(Norway)	FW	Oscar Aga	1	0	0	0	1	0
30	(Norway)	DF	Peder Vogt	0	0	1	0	1	0
88	(Norway)	FW	Herman Geelmuyden	1	0	0	0	1	0
Players who left Stabæk during the season:
3	(Denmark)	DF	Nikolaj Kirk	1	0	0	0	1	0
10	(Ivory Coast)	FW	Franck Boli	1	0	0	1	1	1
21	(Estonia)	DF	Madis Vihmann	2	0	0	0	2	0
42	(Norway)	MF	Tobias Børkeeiet	2	1	0	0	2	1
			TOTALS	46	2	4	1	50	3
