= 2021–22 UC Sampdoria season =

Sampdoria
2021–22 season
- President: Massimo Ferrero
- Head coach: Roberto D'Aversa (until 17 January); Marco Giampaolo (from 18 January)
- Stadium: Stadio Luigi Ferraris
- Serie A: 15th
- Coppa Italia: Round of 16
- Top goalscorer: League: Francesco Caputo (11); All: Francesco Caputo (11)
Home colours	Away colours	Third colours

The 2021–22 season was the 76th season in the existence of UC Sampdoria and the club's 10th consecutive season in the top flight of Italian football. In addition to the domestic league, Sampdoria participated in this season's edition of the Coppa Italia.

== Players ==
=== First-team squad ===
As of 9 February 2022.

Note: Flags indicate national team as defined under FIFA eligibility rules; some limited exceptions apply. Players may hold more than one non-FIFA nationality.

No.	Pos.	Nation	Player
1	GK	ITA	Emil Audero
2	MF	NOR	Morten Thorsby
3	DF	ITA	Tommaso Augello
5	MF	ITA	Stefano Sensi (on loan from Inter)
6	MF	SWE	Albin Ekdal (3rd captain)
7	FW	UKR	Vladyslav Supryaha (on loan from Dynamo Kyiv)
10	FW	ITA	Francesco Caputo (on loan from Sassuolo)
11	MF	GER	Abdelhamid Sabiri (on loan from Ascoli)
13	DF	ITA	Andrea Conti
14	MF	ENG	Ronaldo Vieira
15	DF	GAM	Omar Colley
16	MF	NOR	Kristoffer Askildsen
21	FW	ITA	Sebastian Giovinco

No.	Pos.	Nation	Player
22	DF	JPN	Maya Yoshida
23	FW	ITA	Manolo Gabbiadini
24	DF	POL	Bartosz Bereszyński (vice-captain)
25	DF	ITA	Alex Ferrari
26	DF	ITA	Giangiacomo Magnani (on loan from Hellas Verona)
27	FW	ITA	Fabio Quagliarella (captain)
28	MF	ESP	Gerard Yepes
29	DF	ITA	Nicola Murru
30	GK	ITA	Nicola Ravaglia
33	GK	ITA	Wladimiro Falcone
38	MF	DEN	Mikkel Damsgaard
87	MF	ITA	Antonio Candreva
88	MF	VEN	Tomás Rincón (on loan from Torino)

=== Out on loan ===
As of 3 August 2021

Note: Flags indicate national team as defined under FIFA eligibility rules; some limited exceptions apply. Players may hold more than one non-FIFA nationality.

No.	Pos.	Nation	Player
—	DF	ITA	Antony Angileri (at ACR Messina until 30 June 2022)
—	DF	ITA	Leonardo Benedetti (at Imola until 30 June 2022)
—	DF	GER	Jeff Chabot (at 1. FC Köln until 30 June 2023)
—	DF	ITA	Fabio Depaoli (at Hellas Verona until 30 June 2022)
—	DF	ITA	Tommaso Farabegoli (at Feralpisalò until 30 June 2022)
—	DF	ITA	Simone Giordano (at Piacenza until 30 June 2022)
—	DF	COL	Jeison Murillo (at Celta Vigo until 30 June 2022)
—	DF	BRA	Kaique Rocha (at Internacional until 30 June 2023)
—	MF	FRA	Mehdi Léris (at Brescia until 30 June 2022)
—	MF	ITA	Nicolò Francofonte (at Gubbio until 30 June 2022)

No.	Pos.	Nation	Player
—	MF	ITA	Valerio Verre (at Empoli until 30 June 2022)
—	FW	ITA	Felice D'Amico (at Gubbio until 30 June 2022)
—	FW	ITA	Matteo Stoppa (at Juve Stabia until 30 June 2022)
—	FW	ITA	Federico Bonazzoli (at Salernitana until 30 June 2022)
—	FW	ITA	Antonino La Gumina (at Como until 30 June 2022)
—	FW	ITA	Manuel De Luca (at Perugia until 30 June 2022)
—	FW	ITA	Gianluca Caprari (at Hellas Verona until 30 June 2022)
—	FW	ITA	Erik Gerbi (at SSU P. Timisoara until 30 June 2022)
—	FW	SLO	Nik Prelec (at Olimpija Ljubljana until 30 June 2022)
—	FW	ITA	Ernesto Torregrossa (at Pisa until 30 June 2022)

== Pre-season and friendlies ==
Win Draw Loss Fixtures

26 July 2021 Friendly	Sampdoria (Italy)	2–0	(Italy) Piacenza	Genoa, Italy
18:00 CEST (UTC+2)	Quagliarella 31', 41'	Report		Stadium: Stadio Luigi Ferraris; Referee: Gianmarco Vailati

30 July 2021 Friendly	Sampdoria (Italy)	Cancelled	(Italy) Spezia	Cles, Italy
17:00 CEST (UTC+2)				Stadium: Campo Sportivo Cles

7 August 2021 Friendly	Sampdoria (Italy)	1–0	(Italy) Hellas Verona	Pavia, Italy
19:00 CEST (UTC+2)	Murillo 45+1'	Report		Stadium: Stadio Pietro Fortunati; Referee: Francesco Cosso

4 September 2021 Friendly	Sampdoria (Italy)	3–1	(Italy) Ternana	Bogliasco, Italy
11:00 CEST (UTC+2)	Caputo 25'; Chabot 70'; Verre 75'	Report	Capone 86'	Stadium: Centro sportivo Gloriano Mugnaini; Referee: Matteo Gariglio

== Competitions ==
=== Overall record ===
Competition	First match	Last match	Starting round	Final position	Record							
Competition	First match	Last match	Starting round	Final position	Pld	W	D	L	GF	GA	GD	Win %
Serie A	23 August 2021	22 May 2022	Matchday 1	15th	38	10	6	22	46	63	−17	26.32
Coppa Italia	16 August 2021	18 January 2022	First round	Round of 16	3	2	0	1	6	7	−1	66.67
Total					41	12	6	23	52	70	−18	29.27

Source: Soccerway

=== Serie A ===
==== League table ====
Pos	Team	Pld	W	D	L	GF	GA	GD	Pts
13	Bologna	38	12	10	16	44	55	−11	46
14	Empoli	38	10	11	17	50	70	−20	41
15	Sampdoria	38	10	6	22	46	63	−17	36
16	Spezia	38	10	6	22	41	71	−30	36
17	Salernitana	38	7	10	21	33	78	−45	31

Source: Serie A
Rules for classification: 1) Points; 2) Head-to-head points; 3) Head-to-head goal difference; 4) Goal difference; 5) Goals scored; 6) Draw. (Note: Head-to-head record is used only after all the matches between the teams in question have been played)

==== Results summary ====
Overall								Home						Away					
Pld	W	D	L	GF	GA	GD	Pts	W	D	L	GF	GA	GD	W	D	L	GF	GA	GD
38	10	6	22	46	63	−17	36	6	3	10	29	32	−3	4	3	12	17	31	−14

Source: Serie A

==== Results by round ====
Round	1	2	3	4	5	6	7	8	9	10	11	12	13	14	15	16	17	18	19	20	21	22	23	24	25	26	27	28	29	30	31	32	33	34	35	36	37	38
Ground	H	A	H	A	H	A	H	A	H	H	A	H	A	H	A	H	A	H	A	H	A	H	A	H	A	H	A	A	H	A	H	A	H	A	H	A	H	A
Result	L	D	D	W	L	L	D	L	W	L	L	L	W	W	L	L	W	D	D	L	L	L	L	W	L	W	L	L	L	W	L	L	L	D	W	L	W	L
Position	16	13	15	11	13	15	15	17	15	15	15	18	16	15	15	15	14	15	15	15	15	16	16	16	16	14	15	15	16	15	16	16	16	16	15	15	15	15

Source: Serie A
A = Away; H = Home; W = Win; D = Draw; L = Loss

==== Matches ====
The league fixtures were announced on 14 July 2021.

23 August 2021 1	Sampdoria	0–1	Milan	Genoa
20:45 CEST (UTC+2)	Gabbiadini (yellow card) 33'; Murru (yellow card) 89'; Bereszyński (yellow card) 90+3'	Report	Brahim 9'; Kjær (yellow card) 86'	Stadium: Stadio Luigi Ferraris; Attendance: 4,966; Referee: Marco Guida

29 August 2021 2	Sassuolo	0–0	Sampdoria	Reggio Emilia
18:30 CEST (UTC+2)	Caputo (yellow card) 49'; Chiricheș (yellow card) 78'	Report	Bereszyński (yellow card) 41'; Thorsby (yellow card) 90+3'	Stadium: Mapei Stadium – Città del Tricolore; Attendance: 3,309; Referee: Juan Luca Sacchi

12 September 2021 3	Sampdoria	2–2	Internazionale	Genoa
12:30 CEST (UTC+2)	Yoshida 32'; Thorsby (yellow card) 35'; Augello 47'; Bereszyński (yellow card) 67'; Colley (yellow card) 82'; Silva (yellow card) 88'	Report	Dimarco 18'; Brozović (yellow card) 22'; Martínez 44'; Džeko (yellow card) 89'; Correa (yellow card) 90'; Vidal (yellow card) 90+3'	Stadium: Stadio Luigi Ferraris; Attendance: 7,441; Referee: Daniele Orsato

19 September 2021 4	Empoli	0–3	Sampdoria	Empoli
12:30 CEST (UTC+2)	Żurkowski (yellow card) 59'; Luperto (yellow card) 90+4'	Report	Caputo 31', 52'; Candreva 70'; Askildsen (yellow card) 73'; Torregrossa (yellow card) 88'	Stadium: Stadio Carlo Castellani; Attendance: 3,064; Referee: Maurizio Mariani

23 September 2021 5	Sampdoria	0–4	Napoli	Genoa
18:30 CEST (UTC+2)	Damsgaard (yellow card) 28'; Depaoli (yellow card) 76'	Report	Osimhen 10', 50'; Fabián 39'; Zieliński 59'; Manolas (yellow card) 87'	Stadium: Stadio Luigi Ferraris; Attendance: 4,596; Referee: Paolo Valeri

26 September 2021 6	Juventus	3–2	Sampdoria	Turin
12:30 CEST (UTC+2)	Dybala 10'; Bonucci 43' (pen.), (yellow card) 84'; Bentancur (yellow card) 53'; Locatelli 57'; Cuadrado (yellow card) 66'; Kean (yellow card) 86'	Report	Thorsby (yellow card) 28'; Murru (yellow card) 41'; Yoshida 44'; Ekdal (yellow card) 45+2'; Candreva 83'	Stadium: Juventus Stadium; Attendance: 15,381; Referee: Giovanni Ayroldi

3 October 2021 7	Sampdoria	3–3	Udinese	Genoa
15:00 CEST (UTC+2)	Stryger Larsen 24' (o.g.); Quagliarella 48' (pen.); Thorsby (yellow card) 53'; Candreva 69'; Askildsen (yellow card) 77'; Bereszyński (yellow card) 86'; Ekdal (yellow card) 90+1'	Report	Pereyra 15', (yellow card) 72'; Beto 43'; Silvestri (yellow card) 47'; Samir (yellow card) 78'; Forestieri 82', (yellow card) 90+4'; Becão (yellow card) 90+2'	Stadium: Stadio Luigi Ferraris; Attendance: 4,292; Referee: Daniele Orsato

17 October 2021 8	Cagliari	3–1	Sampdoria	Cagliari
12:30 CEST (UTC+2)	João Pedro 4', 90+4'; Carboni (yellow card) 13'; Deiola (yellow card) 55'; Cáceres 74'; Strootman (yellow card) 86'; Pavoletti (yellow card) 90+1'	Report	Thorsby (yellow card) 51', (goal) 82'; Yoshida (yellow card) 59'	Stadium: Sardegna Arena; Attendance: 9,923; Referee: Matteo Marchetti

22 October 2021 9	Sampdoria	2–1	Spezia	Genoa
20:45 CEST (UTC+2)	Gyasi 15' (o.g.); Candreva 36', (yellow card) 57'; Bereszyński (yellow card) 44'; Colley (yellow card) 45+2'	Report	Hristov (yellow card) 14'; Verde 90+5'	Stadium: Stadio Luigi Ferraris; Attendance: 7,493; Referee: Michael Fabbri

27 October 2021 10	Sampdoria	1–3	Atalanta	Genoa
18:30 CEST (UTC+2)	Caputo 10'; Thorsby (yellow card) 26'; Askildsen (yellow card) 29'; Colley (yellow card) 36'; Chabot (yellow card) 90+1'	Report	Palomino (yellow card) 14'; Askildsen 17' (o.g.); Zapata 21'; Iličić (yellow card) 64', (goal) 90+5'; Freuler (yellow card) 90+3'	Stadium: Stadio Luigi Ferraris; Attendance: 5,462; Referee: Alessandro Prontera

30 October 2021 11	Torino	3–0	Sampdoria	Turin
20:45 CEST (UTC+2)	Praet 17'; Bremer (yellow card) 29'; Pobega (yellow card) 50'; Singo 52'; Belotti 90+3'	Report	Drăgușin (yellow card) 55'; Silva (red card) 67'; Askildsen (yellow card) 75'; Chabot (yellow card) 81'; Candreva (yellow card) 84'	Stadium: Stadio Olimpico Grande Torino; Attendance: 13,137; Referee: Francesco Fourneau

7 November 2021 12	Sampdoria	1–2	Bologna	Genoa
15:00 CET (UTC+1)	Gabbiadini (yellow card) 33'; Colley (yellow card) 34'; Thorsby 77'; Ekdal (yellow card) 90'; Murru (yellow card) 90+2'	Report	Hickey (yellow card) 11'; Svanberg 47'; Arnautović 78'	Stadium: Stadio Luigi Ferraris; Attendance: 5,694; Referee: Gianluca Manganiello

21 November 2021 13	Salernitana	0–2	Sampdoria	Salerno
15:00 CET (UTC+1)		Report	Bereszyński (yellow card) 24'; Di Tacchio 40' (o.g.); Candreva 43'; Ekdal (yellow card) 57'; Chabot (yellow card) 86'	Stadium: Stadio Arechi; Attendance: 11,849; Referee: Piero Giacomelli

27 November 2021 14	Sampdoria	3–1	Hellas Verona	Genoa
15:00 CET (UTC+1)	Candreva 51'; Bereszyński (yellow card) 56'; Ekdal (yellow card) 69', (goal) 77'; Thorsby (yellow card) 71'; Quagliarella (yellow card) 80'; Murru 90'	Report	Tameze 37'; Faraoni (yellow card) 65'	Stadium: Stadio Luigi Ferraris; Attendance: 6,813; Referee: Lorenzo Maggioni

30 November 2021 15	Fiorentina	3–1	Sampdoria	Florence
18:30 CET (UTC+1)	Callejón 23'; Vlahović 32'; Sottil 45'	Report	Gabbiadini 15', (yellow card) 42'; Colley (yellow card) 74'; Ferrari (yellow card) 82'	Stadium: Stadio Artemio Franchi; Attendance: 17,913; Referee: Federico Dionisi

5 December 2021 16	Sampdoria	1–3	Lazio	Genoa
18:00 CET (UTC+1)	Candreva (yellow card) 14'; Bereszyński (yellow card) 39'; Quagliarella (yellow card) 39'; Silva (yellow card) 80'; Gabbiadini 89'	Report	Milinković-Savić 7', (yellow card) 67' (yellow-red card) 67'; Immobile 17', 37'; Muriqi (yellow card) 88'	Stadium: Stadio Luigi Ferraris; Attendance: 5,883; Referee: Michael Fabbri

10 December 2021 17	Genoa	1–3	Sampdoria	Genoa
20:45 CET (UTC+1)	Destro 78'; Ghiglione (yellow card) 84'; Sturaro (yellow card) 90'	Report	Gabbiadini 7', 67'; Thorsby (yellow card) 34'; Caputo 49'; Chabot (yellow card) 90+5'	Stadium: Stadio Luigi Ferraris; Attendance: 19,983; Referee: Daniele Doveri

19 December 2021 18	Sampdoria	1–1	Venezia	Genoa
18:00 CET (UTC+1)	Gabbiadini 1'; Audero (yellow card) 81'; Silva (yellow card) 88'	Report	Forte (yellow card) 82'; Henry 87'	Stadium: Stadio Luigi Ferraris; Attendance: 5,735; Referee: Rosario Abisso

22 December 2021 19	Roma	1–1	Sampdoria	Rome
18:30 CET (UTC+1)	Shomurodov 72'	Report	Bereszyński (yellow card) 44'; Falcone (yellow card) 60'; Askildsen (yellow card) 61'; Gabbiadini 80'	Stadium: Stadio Olimpico; Attendance: 49,400; Referee: Piero Giacomelli

6 January 2022 20	Sampdoria	1–2	Cagliari	Genoa
12:30 CET (UTC+1)	Gabbiadini 18'; Ekdal (yellow card) 52'; Candreva (red card) 90+1'	Report	Lovato (yellow card) 32'; Deiola 55'; João Pedro (yellow card) 61'; Pavoletti 71'; Carboni (yellow card) 90+2'	Stadium: Stadio Luigi Ferraris; Attendance: 3,188; Referee: Giacomo Camplone

9 January 2022 21	Napoli	1–0	Sampdoria	Naples
16:30 CET (UTC+1)	Petagna 43'	Report	Chabot (yellow card) 45+1'; Murru (yellow card) 90+1'	Stadium: Stadio Diego Armando Maradona; Attendance: 9,000; Referee: Marco Di Bello

15 January 2022 22	Sampdoria	1–2	Torino	Genoa
15:00 CET (UTC+1)	Caputo 18'	Report	Singo 27'; Lukić (yellow card) 52'; Bremer (yellow card) 65'; Praet 67'	Stadium: Stadio Luigi Ferraris; Attendance: 2,549; Referee: Luca Massimi

23 January 2022 23	Spezia	1–0	Sampdoria	La Spezia
15:00 CET (UTC+1)	Erlić (yellow card) 30'; Verde 69', (yellow card) 71'	Report	Thorsby (yellow card) 37'; Ekdal (yellow card) 47' (yellow-red card) 73'; Rincón (yellow card) 52'	Stadium: Stadio Alberto Picco; Attendance: 5,000; Referee: Gianluca Manganiello

6 February 2022 24	Sampdoria	4–0	Sassuolo	Genoa
15:00 CET (UTC+1)	Caputo 5'; Sensi 7'; Candreva (yellow card) 20', (goal) 90+1' (pen.); Falcone (yellow card) 58'; Conti 63'	Report	Raspadori (yellow card) 45+4'; Scamacca (yellow card) 50'	Stadium: Stadio Luigi Ferraris; Attendance: 6,232; Referee: Fabio Maresca

13 February 2022 25	Milan	1–0	Sampdoria	Milan
12:30 CET (UTC+1)	Leão 8'; Brahim (yellow card) 19'; Romagnoli (yellow card) 26'; Bennacer (yellow card) 60'	Report	Rincón (yellow card) 10'	Stadium: San Siro; Attendance: 35,710; Referee: Daniele Chiffi

19 February 2022 26	Sampdoria	2–0	Empoli	Genoa
15:00 CET (UTC+1)	Quagliarella 14', 29'; Bereszyński (yellow card) 42'; Ekdal (yellow card) 45'; Candreva (yellow card) 65'; Conti (yellow card) 74'	Report	Bajrami (yellow card) 31'; Asllani (yellow card) 43'	Stadium: Stadio Luigi Ferraris; Attendance: 9,069; Referee: Antonio Rapuano

28 February 2022 27	Atalanta	4–0	Sampdoria	Bergamo
20:50 CET (UTC+1)	Pašalić 6'; Koopmeiners 29', 61'; Tolói (yellow card) 77'; Miranchuk 86'	Report	Ekdal (yellow card) 48'; Thorsby (yellow card) 66'	Stadium: Gewiss Stadium; Attendance: 10,245; Referee: Simone Sozza

5 March 2022 28	Udinese	2–1	Sampdoria	Udine
15:00 CET (UTC+1)	Deulofeu 3', (yellow card) 87'; Udogie 12'; Pereyra (yellow card) 44'; Walace (yellow card) 56'; Arslan (yellow card) 68'; Becão (yellow card) 74'	Report	Caputo 13'; Ekdal (yellow card) 63'; Murru (yellow card) 68'	Stadium: Stadio Friuli; Attendance: 12,405; Referee: Massimiliano Irrati

12 March 2022 29	Sampdoria	1–3	Juventus	Genoa
18:00 CET (UTC+1)	Candreva (penalty missed) 74'; Sabiri 84'	Report	Yoshida 23' (o.g.); Morata 34' (pen.), 88'; Rabiot (yellow card) 49'; Pellegrini (yellow card) 82'	Stadium: Stadio Luigi Ferraris; Attendance: 16,644; Referee: Paolo Valeri

20 March 2022 30	Venezia	0–2	Sampdoria	Venice
12:30 CET (UTC+1)	Haps (yellow card) 35'; Henry (yellow card) 42' (yellow-red card) 86'; Okereke (yellow card) 44'; Busio (yellow card) 63'	Report	Caputo 24', 38'; Sabiri (yellow card) 35'	Stadium: Stadio Pier Luigi Penzo; Attendance: 7,591; Referee: Daniele Orsato

3 April 2022 31	Sampdoria	0–1	Roma	Genoa
18:00 CEST (UTC+2)	Bereszyński (yellow card) 46'; Sabiri (yellow card) 71'	Report	Ibañez (yellow card) 9'; Mkhitaryan 27'; Oliveira (yellow card) 48'; Pellegrini (yellow card) 90+2'	Stadium: Stadio Luigi Ferraris; Attendance: 16,465; Referee: Gianluca Manganiello

11 April 2022 32	Bologna	2–0	Sampdoria	Bologna
20:45 CEST (UTC+2)	Svanberg (yellow card) 38'; Arnautović 61', 76'	Report	Sabiri (yellow card) 10'; Ferrari (yellow card) 59'	Stadium: Stadio Renato Dall'Ara; Attendance: 15,783; Referee: Luca Pairetto

16 April 2022 33	Sampdoria	1–2	Salernitana	Genoa
14:30 CEST (UTC+2)	Caputo 32'; Sensi (yellow card) 89'	Report	Fazio 4'; Éderson 6'; Đurić (yellow card) 20'; Sepe (yellow card) 20'; Bonazzoli (yellow card) 49'; Bohinen (yellow card) 50'; Ribéry (yellow card) 79'; Mazzocchi (yellow card) 80'; Ranieri (yellow card) 84'	Stadium: Stadio Luigi Ferraris; Attendance: 14,908; Referee: Paolo Valeri

23 April 2022 34	Hellas Verona	1–1	Sampdoria	Verona
20:45 CEST (UTC+2)	Günter (yellow card) 43'; Caprari 78'	Report	Rincón (yellow card) 32'; Caputo (penalty missed) 44', 44'; Vieira (yellow card) 51'; Bereszyński (yellow card) 80'	Stadium: Stadio Marcantonio Bentegodi; Attendance: 16,188; Referee: Giovanni Ayroldi

30 April 2022 35	Sampdoria	1–0	Genoa	Genoa
18:00 CEST (UTC+2)	Sabiri 25'; Audero (yellow card) 32'; Bereszyński (yellow card) 51'; Ferrari (yellow card) 90+5'	Report	Melegoni (yellow card) 90+1'; Criscito (penalty missed) 90+6'	Stadium: Stadio Luigi Ferraris; Attendance: 30,136; Referee: Fabio Maresca

7 May 2022 36	Lazio	2–0	Sampdoria	Rome
20:45 CEST (UTC+2)	Patric 41'; Luis Alberto 59'; Hysaj (yellow card) 82'	Report	Vieira (yellow card) 79'	Stadium: Stadio Olimpico; Attendance: 33,000; Referee: Davide Massa

16 May 2022 37	Sampdoria	4–1	Fiorentina	Genoa
18:30 CEST (UTC+2)	Ferrari 16'; Vieira (yellow card) 18'; Quagliarella 30'; Thorsby 71'; Sabiri 84'; Trimboli (yellow card) 89'; Colley (yellow card) 90+4', (red card) 90+4'	Report	Torreira (yellow card) 14'; González (yellow card) 15', (goal) 89' (pen.); Maleh (yellow card) 69'	Stadium: Stadio Luigi Ferraris; Attendance: 21,331; Referee: Maurizio Mariani

22 May 2022 38	Internazionale	3–0	Sampdoria	Milan
18:00 CEST (UTC+2)	Barella (yellow card) 30'; Perišić 49'; Correa 55', 57'	Report	Yoshida (yellow card) 5'; Ferrari (yellow card) 66'	Stadium: San Siro; Attendance: 71,109; Referee: Marco Di Bello

=== Coppa Italia ===
16 August 2021 First round	Sampdoria	3–2	Alessandria	Genoa
21:00 CEST (UTC+2)	Quagliarella 28'; Gabbiadini 47'; Thorsby 52'; Murillo (yellow card) 72'; Chabot (yellow card) 89'	Report	Chiarello 8'; Ba (yellow card) 23'; Casarini (yellow card) 42'; Corazza 45' (pen.); Benedetti (yellow card) 65' (yellow-red card) 84'	Stadium: Stadio Luigi Ferraris; Attendance: 1,249; Referee: Andrea Colombo

16 December 2021 Second round	Sampdoria	2–1	Torino	Genoa
18:00 CET (UTC+1)	Quagliarella 16' (pen.); Chabot (yellow card) 52'; Verre 60'; Ciervo (yellow card) 64'; Murru (yellow card) 69'; Askildsen (yellow card) 88'; Silva (yellow card) 90+4'	Report	Mandragora 54' (pen.); Buongiorno (yellow card) 59'	Stadium: Stadio Luigi Ferraris; Attendance: 3,124; Referee: Marco Piccinini

18 January 2022 Round of 16	Juventus	4–1	Sampdoria	Turin
21:00 CET (UTC+1)	Cuadrado 25'; Rugani 52'; Dybala 67'; Morata 77' (pen.); Alex Sandro (yellow card) 79'	Report	Conti 63'; Rincón (yellow card) 85'; Vieira (yellow card) 88'	Stadium: Juventus Stadium; Attendance: 5,000; Referee: Francesco Fourneau

== Statistics ==
=== Appearances and goals ===
No.	Pos	Nat	Player	Total		Serie A		Coppa Italia	
No.	Pos	Nat	Player	Apps	Goals	Apps	Goals	Apps	Goals
Goalkeepers
1	GK	(Italy) ITA	Emil Audero	9	0	8	0	1	0
Defenders
3	DF	(Italy) ITA	Tommaso Augello	9	1	7+1	1	1	0
4	DF	(Germany) GER	Jeff Chabot	2	0	0+1	0	1	0
12	DF	(Italy) ITA	Fabio Depaoli	6	0	1+4	0	0+1	0
15	DF	(The Gambia) GAM	Omar Colley	8	0	8	0	0	0
19	DF	(Romania) ROU	Radu Dragusin	0	0	0	0	0	0
22	DF	(Japan) JPN	Maya Yoshida	8	2	8	2	0	0
24	DF	(Poland) POL	Bartosz Bereszyński	9	0	8	0	1	0
25	DF	(Italy) ITA	Alex Ferrari	0	0	0	0	0	0
29	DF	(Italy) ITA	Nicola Murru	4	0	1+3	0	0	0
Midfielders
2	MF	(Norway) NOR	Morten Thorsby	9	2	8	1	1	1
5	MF	(Portugal) POR	Adrien Silva	8	0	5+3	0	0	0
6	MF	(Sweden) SWE	Albin Ekdal	7	0	3+3	0	1	0
8	MF	(Italy) ITA	Valerio Verre	4	0	1+3	0	0	0
14	MF	(England) ENG	Ronaldo Vieira	0	0	0	0	0	0
16	MF	(Norway) NOR	Kristoffer Askildsen	8	0	1+6	0	0+1	0
20	MF	(Netherlands) NED	Mohamed Ihattaren	0	0	0	0	0	0
38	MF	(Denmark) DEN	Mikkel Damsgaard	8	0	6+1	0	0+1	0
87	MF	(Italy) ITA	Antonio Candreva	9	3	8	3	1	0
Forwards
9	FW	(Italy) ITA	Ernesto Torregrossa	6	0	0+5	0	0+1	0
10	FW	(Italy) ITA	Francesco Caputo	6	2	5+1	2	0	0
11	FW	(Italy) ITA	Riccardo Ciervo	1	0	0+1	0	0	0
23	FW	(Italy) ITA	Manolo Gabbiadini	3	1	2	0	1	1
27	FW	(Italy) ITA	Fabio Quagliarella	9	2	8	1	1	1
Players transferred out during the season
14	MF	(Czech Republic) CZE	Jakub Jankto	1	0	0	0	1	0
17	FW	(Italy) ITA	Gianluca Caprari	1	0	0	0	0+1	0
20	FW	(Italy) ITA	Antonino La Gumina	0	0	0	0	0	0
21	DF	(Italy) ITA	Lorenzo Tonelli	0	0	0	0	0	0
26	MF	(France) FRA	Mehdi Léris	0	0	0	0	0	0
42	DF	(Brazil) BRA	Kaique Rocha	0	0	0	0	0	0
92	DF	(Colombia) COL	Jeison Murillo	1	0	0	0	1	0

Last updated: 17 October 2021
Source: Competitions
