= Madis Vihmann =

Estonian footballer (born 1995)

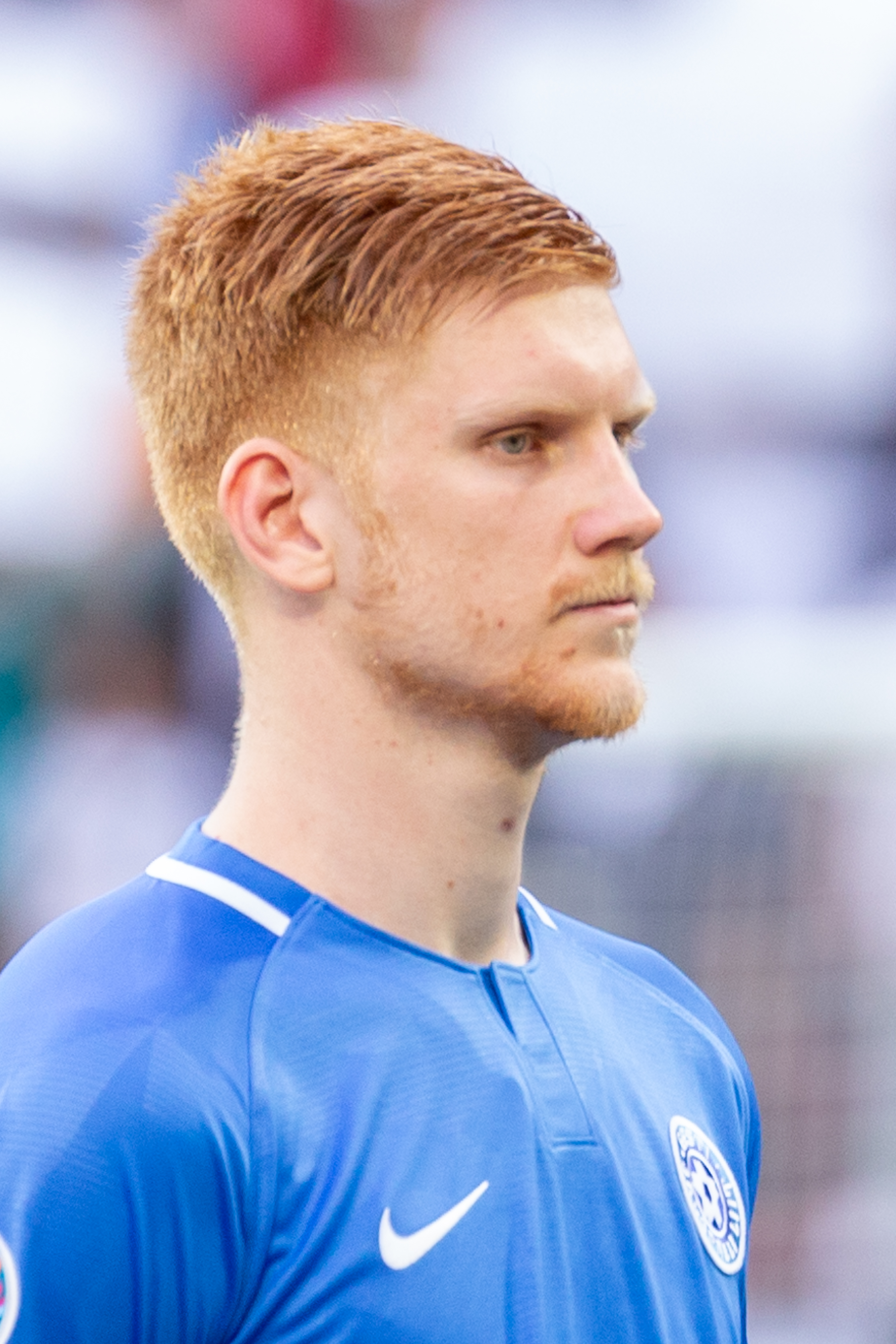
- Vihmann (no 5) in Germany-Estonia

Personal information
- Full name: Madis Vihmann
- Date of birth: 5 October 1995 (age 31)
- Place of birth: Sangaste, Estonia
- Height: 1.95 m (6 ft 5 in)
- Position: Centre back

Youth career
- 2005–2012: Elva

Senior career*
Years	Team	Apps	(Gls)
2011–2014	Elva	7	(0)
2013–2014	→ Levadia II (loan)	57	(4)
2014	→ Levadia III (loan)	1	(0)
2014	→ Levadia (loan)	2	(0)
2014–2020	Flora	95	(16)
2015–2016	Flora U21	8	(0)
2019	→ Stabæk (loan)	14	(1)
2019	→ Stabæk 2 (loan)	3	(0)
2019–2020	→ St Johnstone (loan)	4	(0)

International career
2014–2016	Estonia U21	24	(1)
2014–2016	Estonia U23	2	(0)
2017–2019	Estonia	19	(0)
- * Club domestic league appearances and goals

Madis Vihmann (born 5 October 1995) is a retired Estonian professional footballer who played as a centre back. He played in the Estonia national team in 19 matches.

== Club career ==
=== Elva ===
Vihmann came through the Elva youth system. He made his debut for the first team on 23 April 2011.

==== Levadia (loan) ====
In 2013, Vihmann moved to Levadia on loan where he primarily played for the club's reserve side Levadia II. He made his debut in the Meistriliiga on 18 August 2014, in a 7–0 away win over Tallinna Kalev.

=== Flora ===
On 19 December 2014, Vihmann signed for Flora. He helped Flora win two Meistriliiga titles in 2015 and 2017.

==== Stabæk (loan) ====
On 16 March 2019, Vihmann joined Eliteserien club Stabæk on two-year loan deal.

==== St Johnstone (loan) ====
On 26 July 2019, Vihmann cut short his loan deal with Stabæk to join Scottish Premiership club St Johnstone on a season-long loan, with the option to either extend the loan by another year or to make the deal permanent. He made his debut the next day in a 1–2 away loss to Forfar Athletic in a group stage match of the Scottish League Cup.

The loan deal with St Johnstone was ended on 31 January 2020 and Vihmann returned to Flora. A few days later he chose to retire from football, citing only private personal reasons for his retirement.

== International career ==
Vihmann has represented Estonia at under-21 and under-23 levels. He made his senior international debut for Estonia on 12 June 2017, in a 2–1 away victory over Latvia in a friendly.

== Career statistics ==
=== Club ===
As of 1 December 2019.

Appearances and goals by club, season and competition
Club	Season	League			Cup (Note: Includes the Estonian Cup and Norwegian Cup)		League Cup		Europe		Other		Total	
Club	Season	Division	Apps	Goals	Apps	Goals	Apps	Goals	Apps	Goals	Apps	Goals	Apps	Goals
Elva	2011	III liiga	3	0	0	0	—		—		—		3	0
Elva	2012	II liiga	4	0	0	0	—		—		—		4	0
Elva	Total		7	0	0	0	0	0	0	0	0	0	7	0
Levadia II (loan)	2013	Esiliiga	25	0	—		—		—		—		25	0
Levadia II (loan)	2014	Esiliiga	32	4	—		—		—		—		32	4
Levadia II (loan)	Total		57	4	0	0	0	0	0	0	0	0	57	4
Levadia III (loan)	2014	II liiga	1	0	—		—		—		—		1	0
Levadia (loan)	2014	Meistriliiga	2	0	0	0	—		0	0	0	0	2	0
Flora U21	2015	Esiliiga	3	0	0	0	—		—		—		3	0
Flora U21	2016	Esiliiga	5	0	0	0	—		—		—		5	0
Flora U21	Total		8	0	0	0	0	0	0	0	0	0	8	0
Flora	2015	Meistriliiga	20	1	3	0	—		0	0	—		23	1
Flora	2016	Meistriliiga	14	1	5	0	—		2 (Note: Appearances in UEFA Champions League)	0	0	0	21	1
Flora	2017	Meistriliiga	26	6	1	0	—		2 (Note: Appearances in UEFA Europa League)	0	1 (Note: Appearance in Estonian Supercup)	0	30	6
Flora	2018	Meistriliiga	35	8	3	0	—		4 (Note: Two appearances in UEFA Champions League, two appearances in UEFA Europa League)	0	1	0	43	8
Flora	Total		95	16	12	0	0	0	8	0	2	0	117	16
Stabæk (loan)	2019	Eliteserien	14	1	3	1	—		—		—		17	2
Stabæk 2 (loan)	2019	3. divisjon	3	0	—		—		—		—		3	0
St Johnstone (loan)	2019–20	Scottish Premiership	4	0	0	0	1	0	—		—		5	0
Career total			190	21	15	1	1	0	8	0	2	0	216	22

=== International ===
As of 23 July 2019.

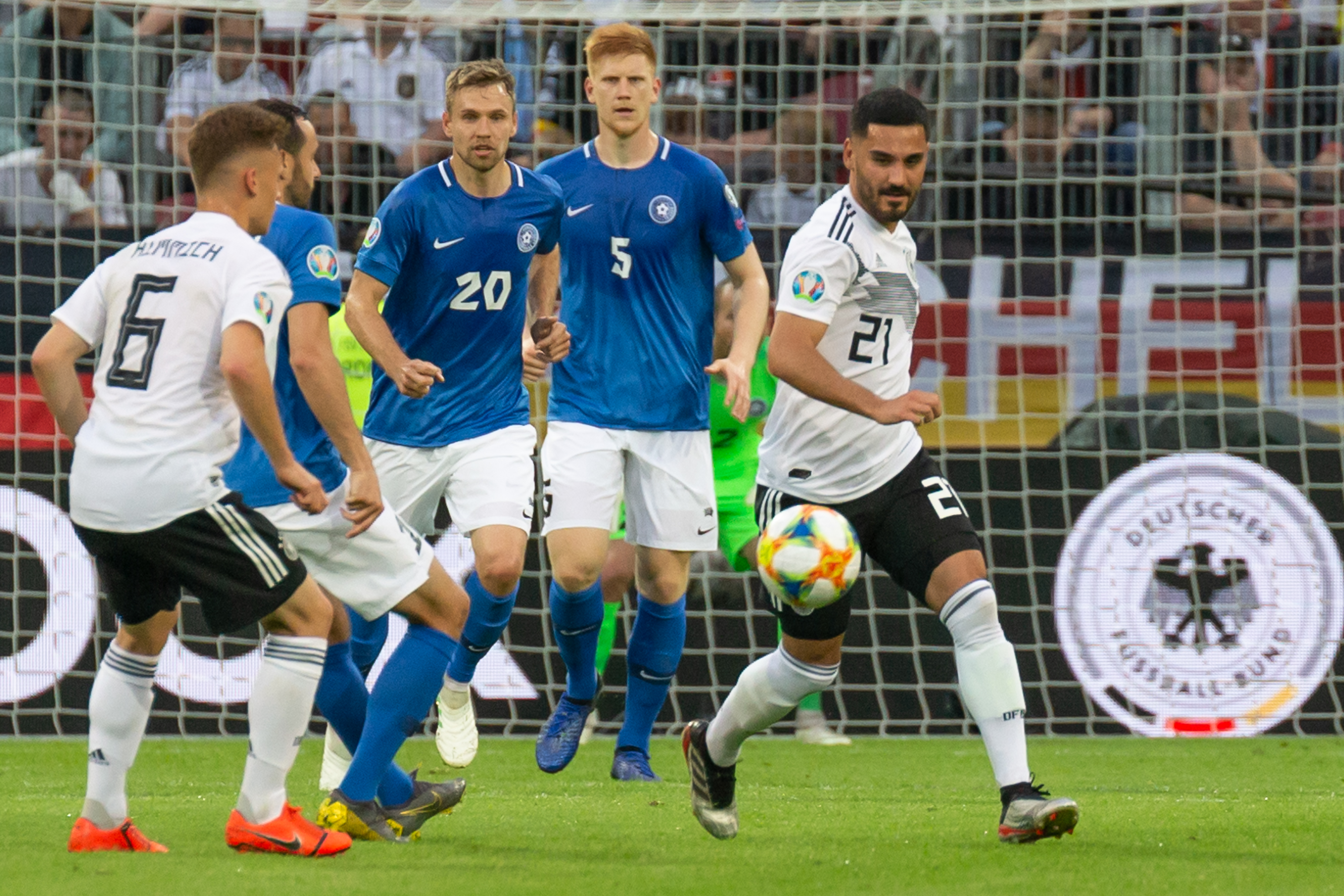
Vihmann (no 5) playing for Estonia against Germany in 2019

Appearances and goals by national team and year
National team	Year	Apps	Goals
Estonia
Estonia	2017	5	0
Estonia	2018	8	0
Estonia	2019	6	0
Total		19	0

== Honours ==
=== Club ===
Levadia II

- Esiliiga: 2013

Flora

- Meistriliiga: 2015, 2017
- Estonian Cup: 2015–16
- Estonian Supercup: 2016

Estonia U21

- Under-21 Baltic Cup: 2014

=== Individual ===
- Meistriliiga Player of the Month: June/July 2018
