= Kristoffer Askildsen =

Norwegian footballer (born 2001)

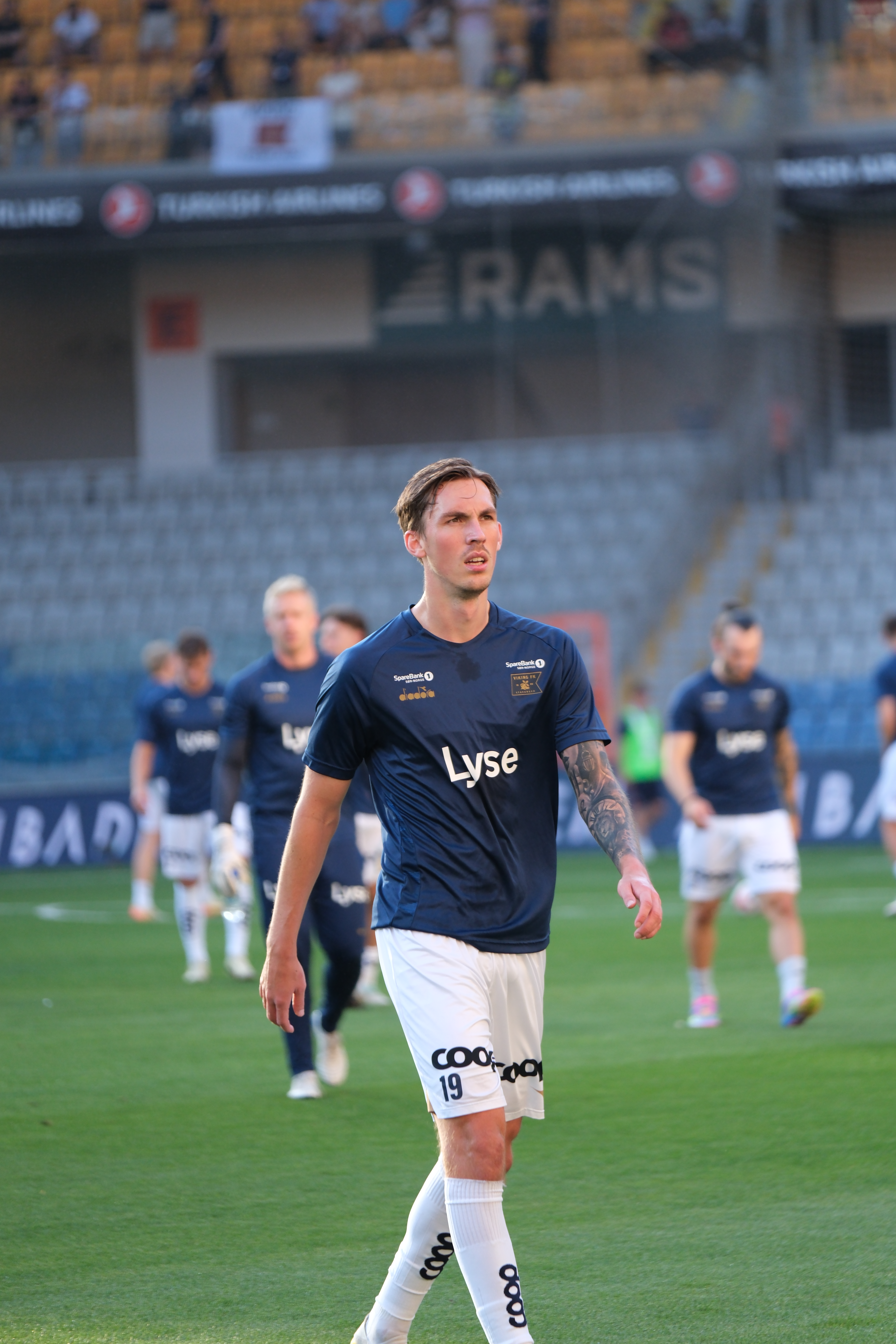

Personal information
- Date of birth: 9 January 2001 (age 25)
- Place of birth: Oslo, Norway
- Height: 1.90 m (6 ft 3 in)
- Position: Midfielder

Team information
- Current team: Viking
- Number: 7

Youth career
- –2013: Heming
- 2013–2018: Stabæk
- 2020: Sampdoria

Senior career*
Years	Team	Apps	(Gls)
2018	Stabæk II	20	(1)
2018–2020	Stabæk	15	(1)
2020–2024	Sampdoria	47	(1)
2022–2023	→ Lecce (loan)	21	(0)
2024–2025	Midtjylland	12	(0)
2025–	Viking	43	(8)

International career^{‡}
2018	Norway U17	8	(1)
2019	Norway U18	11	(1)
2019	Norway U19	3	(1)
2019–2021	Norway U21	9	(0)
2020	Norway	1	(0)
- * Club domestic league appearances and goals as of 19 August 2026 ‡ National team caps and goals as of 18 November 2020

Kristoffer Askildsen (born 9 January 2001) is a Norwegian professional footballer who plays as a midfielder for Eliteserien club Viking. He also represented the Norway national team.

== Career ==
=== Early career ===
Askildsen began his career in Heming, joining Stabæk's academy in his late childhood. He joined the club initially as a goalkeeper, but converted to midfield whilst playing under the guidance of Stabæk's youth coach Øyvind Leonhardsen.

=== Stabæk ===
Askildsen made his debut for the senior team against Ranheim in September 2018, and established himself as a starter in April 2019.

=== Sampdoria ===
Askildsen signed with Italian side Sampdoria on 28 January 2020 on a four-and-a-half-year contract. On 21 June 2020, he made his debut with the club in an away 2–1 loss against Inter Milan. He scored his first goal against Milan in a 4–1 loss. In doing so, Askildsen became the first player born after the Millennium to score for Sampdoria.

==== Loan to Lecce ====
On 17 July 2022, Askildsen joined Lecce on a season-long loan.

=== Midtjylland ===
On July 1, 2024, Danish Superliga club FC Midtjylland confirmed that Askildsen joined the club on a contract until June 2028.

=== Viking ===
At the end of March 2025, Askildsen returned to Norway, signing with Eliteserien club Viking for four years. He made 27 appearances and scored three goals as Viking won the 2025 Eliteserien.

== Career statistics ==
=== Club ===
As of match played 18 August 2026

Appearances and goals by club, season and competition
Club	Season	League			Cup		Europe		Total	
Club	Season	Division	Apps	Goals	Apps	Goals	Apps	Goals	Apps	Goals
Stabæk 2	2018	2. divisjon	20	1	—		—		20	1
Stabæk	2018	Eliteserien	1	0	0	0	—		1	0
Stabæk	2019	Eliteserien	14	1	0	0	—		14	1
Stabæk	Total		15	1	0	0	—		15	1
Sampdoria	2019–20	Serie A	4	1	0	0	—		4	1
Sampdoria	2020–21	Serie A	6	0	1	0	—		7	0
Sampdoria	2021–22	Serie A	19	0	3	0	—		22	0
Sampdoria	2023–24	Serie B	18	0	1	0	—		19	0
Sampdoria	Total		47	1	5	0	—		52	1
Lecce (loan)	2022–23	Serie A	19	0	0	0	—		19	0
Midtjylland	2024–25	Danish Superliga	12	0	1	0	8 (Note: Five appearances in UEFA Champions League, three appearances in UEFA Europa League)	0	21	0
Viking	2025	Eliteserien	27	3	6	0	4 (Note: Appearances in UEFA Conference League)	0	37	3
Viking	2026	Eliteserien	16	5	2	0	1 (Note: One appearances in UEFA Champions League)	0	19	5
Viking	Total		43	8	8	0	5	0	56	8
Career total			158	11	14	0	13	0	185	11

=== International ===
As of match played 18 November 2020

Appearances and goals by national team and year
National team	Year	Apps	Goals
Norway	2020	1	0
Total		1	0

== Honours ==
Viking

- Eliteserien: 2025
