= Strømmen Stadion =

Sports venue in Strømmen, Akershus, Norway

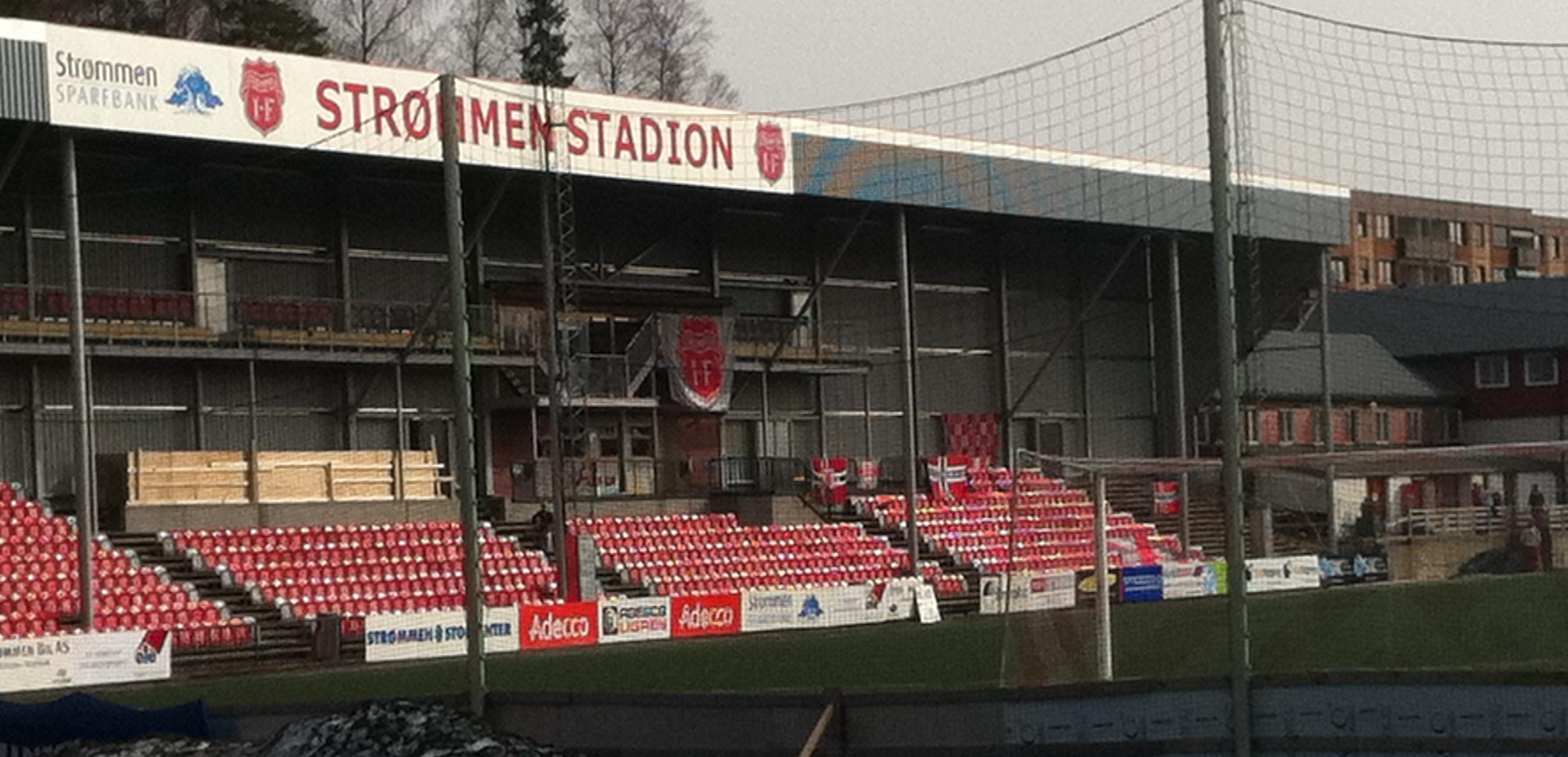
- Interactive map of Strømmen Stadion
- Location: Strømmen, Norway
- Coordinates: 59.940°N 11.004°E
- Capacity: 2,000 (1,000 seated)

Tenants
- Strømmen IF (football); Team Strømmen (football)

Strømmen Stadion is a sports stadium in Strømmen, Lillestrøm, Norway. It is currently used mostly for football matches and is the home ground of Strømmen IF and women's Premier League team Team Strømmen.

The record attendance is about 14,000, from a 1957 cup match where Strømmen played Larvik Turn.
