= Matthew Rusike =

Zimbabwean footballer (born 1990)

Personal information
- Full name: Tyrell Matthew Benjamin Rusike
- Date of birth: 28 June 1990 (age 36)
- Place of birth: Harare, Zimbabwe
- Height: 1.83 m (6 ft 0 in)
- Positions: Attacking midfielder; forward

Youth career
- 2006–2009: BN Academy

Senior career*
Years	Team	Apps	(Gls)
- Charlton Athletic
2009–2011	University of Pretoria	8	(0)
2011–2012	Jomo Cosmos	14	(3)
2012–2015	Kaizer Chiefs	54	(12)
2015	Halmstads BK	11	(4)
2016	Helsingborgs IF	25	(4)
2017	Club Africain	11	(4)
2018–2019	Cape Town City	12	(2)
2019–2020	Stabæk	3	(0)

International career^{‡}
2009–2017	Zimbabwe	8	(1)
- * Club domestic league appearances and goals as of 24 May 2021 ‡ National team caps and goals as of 24 May 2021

Tyrell Matthew Benjamin Rusike (born June 28, 1990) is a retired Zimbabwean footballer who played as a midfielder and striker for Stabæk.He now operates as a football agent.

== Early life ==
Rusike was born to a Zimbabwean retail franchise owner and English mother, a hairdresser. He started playing soccer for the BN Academy and then Charlton Athletic at the age of 16. He attended St. George's College. He also played rugby as a winger or full back. He was also the youngest ever player to play for the St. George's College soccer first team at the age of 13. He is a role model to many St. George's College students.

== Club career ==
=== Monomotapa United ===
He left Charlton Athletic in 2009 after having some work permit issues and came back to Zimbabwe where he won the league in his first year. He also had discipline problems and he contemplated quitting football and going to university but he was contacted by Jomo Sono to join Jomo Cosmos.

=== Jomo Cosmos ===
He was released by University of Pretoria and joined Cosmos in the National First Division and helped them gain promotion to the Premier Soccer League. Clubs like Bolton Wanderers, Ajax Cape Town, Kaizer Chiefs and even clubs from Belgium and France expressed their interest. He also won the 2011–2012 Ezenkosi Player of the Year getting 33.26% of the votes from fans.

=== Kaizer Chiefs ===
He joined Chiefs in 2012. He scored on debut against Bloemfontein Celtic in the Macufe Cup final in a 4–3 loss. He scored his first league goal for Chiefs on 17 December 2012 against AmaZulu in a 2–0 win. He also scored his first CAF Champions League goal over Liga Muçulmana on 1 March 2014 in a 4–0 win. He also scored in the CAF Confederations Cup against ASEC Mimosas in the 86th minute in a 2–1 win. On 22 April 2015, he scored two goals against Polokwane City which gave Kaizer Chiefs a 4–1 victory which crowned Chiefs as champions of the Premier Soccer League. He played his last match for Chiefs on 9 May 2015 against Chippa United in a 2–0 win.

He also holds South African citizenship and is therefore registered as a local.

=== Halmstads BK ===
On 24 July 2015, Rusike signed a one and half year deal with the Swedish club, having signed with Portuguese club C.D. Nacional initially. His league debut for the club came on 9 August 2015 in a 0–0 home draw with Åtvidabergs FF. He was replaced by Alexander Henningsson in the 69th minute. His first Allsvenskan goal came on 23 August 2015 in a 2–2 home draw with Örebro SK. His goal, scored in the 49th minute, leveled the score at 1–1.

=== Helsingborgs IF ===
In January 2016, Rusike moved to another Swedish club in Helsingborgs IF. He made his league debut for the club on 3 April 2016 in a 1–1 away draw with Gefle IF. He was subbed on for Linus Hallenius in the 71st minute. He scored his first league goal for the club on 8 May 2016 in a 2–1 home victory over Malmö FF. His goal, assisted by Alexander Achinioti-Jönsson, came in the 81st minute. This was just three minutes after he had been subbed on, replacing Linus Hallenius.

=== Club Africain ===
In January 2017, following Helsingborg's relegation, Rusike moved to Tunisian side Club Africain. Originally, Rusike had been set to move to CS Sfaxien, but they were handed a transfer ban. Rusike's league debut for the club came on 15 February 2017 in a 1–0 away loss to AS Marsa. His first league goal in Tunisia came as part of a brace on 26 February 2017. The match was against the club Rusike had joined before they were handed their ban, CS Sfaxien. The match ended 2–1 in favor of Africain. Rusike's goals, the first of which was from the penalty spot, came in the 83rd and 92nd minutes, leading his side to victory. Rusike left the club in June, having not received his months wages.

=== Cape Town City ===
Rusike was finally picked up by Cape Town City F.C. on deadline day of the January 2018 transfer window. He made his league debut on 17 February 2018 in a 1–0 away loss against former his former club Kaizer Chiefs.

He went to Norwegian club Stabæk in 2019, but following several serious injuries he retired from football in early 2020 at the age of 29.

== Career statistics ==
=== International goals ===
As of 17 November 2016. Scores and results list Zimbabwe's goal tally first.

Goal	Date	Venue	Opponent	Score	Result	Competition
1	13 November 2016	National Sports Stadium, Harare, Zimbabwe	Tanzania	2–0	3–0	Friendly
