= Stian Rasch =

Norwegian footballer (born 1987)

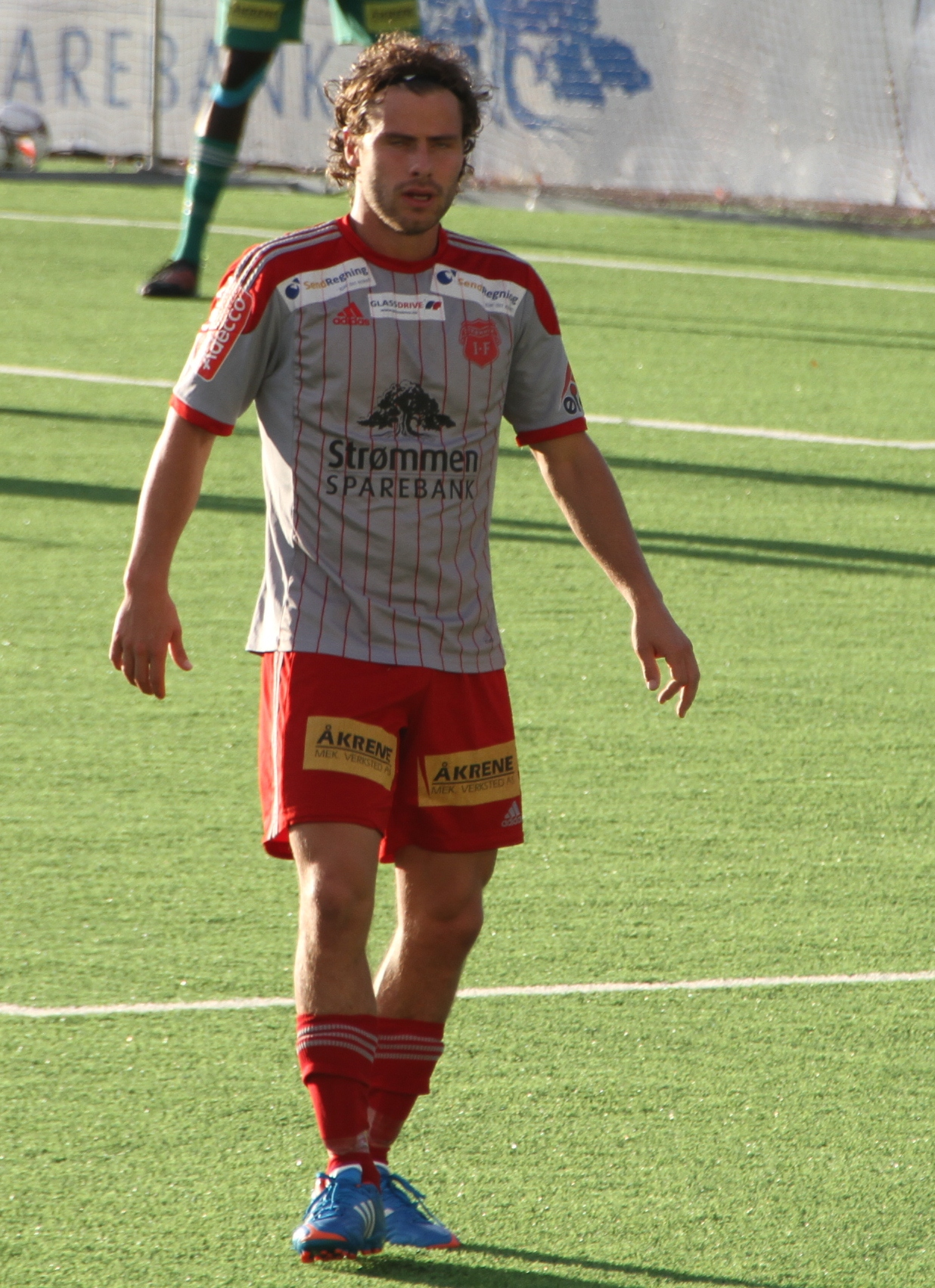
- 2012.

Personal information
- Full name: Stian Kristoffersen Rasch
- Date of birth: 10 March 1987 (age 39)
- Height: 1.70 m (5 ft 7 in)
- Position: Midfielder

Team information
- Current team: Gui

Youth career
- Asker

Senior career*
Years	Team	Apps	(Gls)
2005–2006	Lyn	0	(0)
2006	→ Asker (loan)		
2007–2008	Hønefoss	22	(0)
2009–2011	Asker	78	(6)
2012–2013	Strømmen	51	(9)
2014–2015	Mjøndalen	29	(1)
2016–2017	Strømmen	49	(12)
2018–2019	Heggedal	26	(21)
2021–2023	Frisk Asker		
2024–	Gui		
- * Club domestic league appearances and goals as of 16 June 2025

Stian Rasch (born 10 March 1987) is a Norwegian footballer who played as a midfielder.

== Career ==
He started his youth career in Asker before joining Lyn. He was in the first-team squad for two seasons, but never got to play in Tippeligaen. Having been loaned back to Asker in 2006, he joined Hønefoss ahead of the 2007 season. Another spell in Asker followed, then Strømmen before joining Mjøndalen in 2014. When they won promotion, Rasch could then finally make his debut on the highest tier in the 2015 Eliteserien.

Following two more years in Strømmen he joined fifth-tier Heggedal IL.
