= Emil Bohinen =

Norwegian footballer (born 2001)

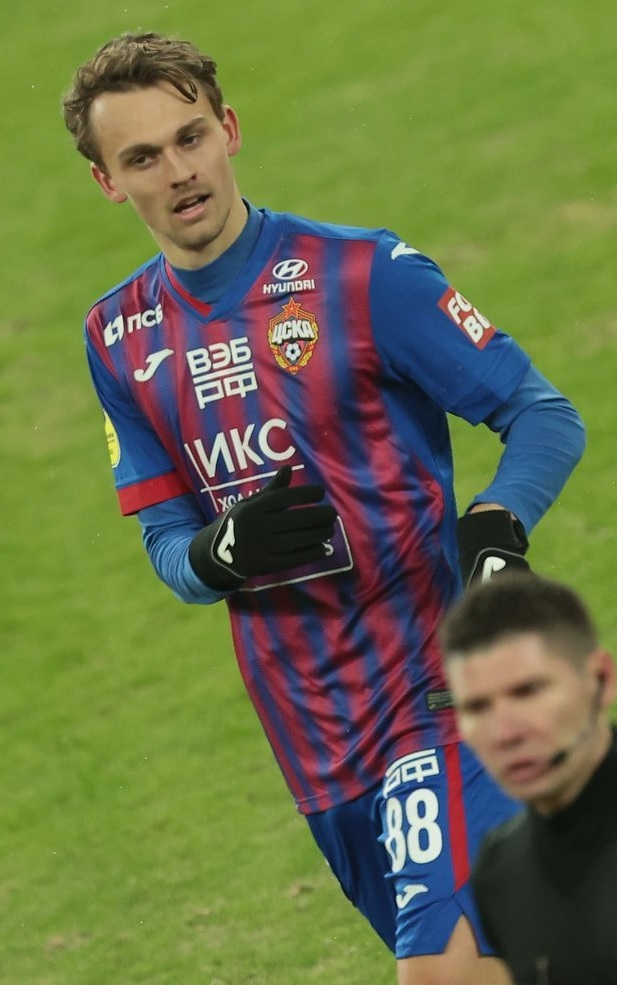
- Bohinen playing for CSKA Moscow in 2021

Personal information
- Full name: Emil Bohinen
- Date of birth: 12 March 1999 (age 27)
- Place of birth: Derby, England
- Height: 1.92 m (6 ft 4 in)
- Position: Central midfielder

Team information
- Current team: Cesena (on loan from Venezia)
- Number: 32

Youth career
- –2017: Stabæk

Senior career*
Years	Team	Apps	(Gls)
2017–2021	Stabæk	67	(9)
2021–2022	CSKA Moscow	12	(1)
2022	→ Salernitana (loan)	11	(0)
2022–2024	Salernitana	36	(0)
2024	→ Genoa (loan)	5	(0)
2024–2026	Genoa	3	(0)
2025	→ Frosinone (loan)	12	(3)
2025–2026	→ Venezia (loan)	8	(0)
2026–	Venezia	3	(0)
2026–	→ Cesena (loan)	0	(0)

International career^{‡}
2015–2016	Norway U16	9	(0)
2016	Norway U17	8	(0)
2017	Norway U18	11	(0)
2019	Norway U20	1	(0)
2018–2020	Norway U21	10	(1)
- * Club domestic league appearances and goals as of 12 May 2026 ‡ National team caps and goals as of 10 October 2020

Emil Bohinen (born 12 March 1999) is a Norwegian professional footballer who plays as a central midfielder for Serie B club Cesena, on loan from Venezia. He is the son of former Norway international midfielder Lars Bohinen.

== Club career ==
=== Stabæk ===
Bohinen joined Stabæk's youth academy and made his first team debut for the club in 2017. He made his debut for the first team in the Eliteserien on 17 April 2017 against Sarpsborg 08 FF, in a 3–0 win.

After scoring four goals and making eights assists in all competitions during the 2019 season, in November 2019, Bohinen was linked with a move to Premier League side Brighton & Hove Albion.

In December 2019, Stabæk entered talks with Premier League side Sheffield United and EFL Championship side Leeds United about the signing of Bohinen, with Bohinen joining Sheffield United on trial. When asked about being linked to Leeds, Bohinen on 21 January 2020 spoke to Eurosport Norway, saying of Leeds' head coach Marcelo Bielsa, 'He is a coaching legend, so of course it would have been an experience in itself to play for him'.

=== CSKA Moscow ===
On 15 February 2021, Russian club CSKA Moscow announced the signing of Bohinen from Stabæk on a contract until the end of the 2024–25 season.

=== Salernitana ===
On 31 January 2022, he joined Italian club Salernitana on loan with an option to buy and a conditional obligation to buy. The condition for the obligation to buy was fulfilled by Salernitana staying in Serie A, and on 29 June 2022 Bohinen moved to Salernitana on a permanent basis, signing a four-year contract.

=== Genoa ===
On 17 January 2024, Bohinen moved to Genoa on loan, with an option to buy and a conditional obligation to buy.

==== Loan to Frosinone ====
On 3 February 2025, Bohinen joined Frosinone on loan.

=== Venezia ===
On 1 September 2025, Bohinen moved on loan to Venezia, with a conditional obligation to buy. On 2 February 2026, Venezia made the transfer permanent and signed a contract with Bohinen until 30 June 2028.

==== Loan to Cesena ====
On 30 August 2026, Bohinen joined Cesena on a season-long loan.

== International career ==
Despite being born in Derby, England during his father's spell with Derby County, Bohinen has represented Norway at several age groups up to and including Norway U21.

Bohinen was highly rated as part of the same age group of the new generation of Norwegian footballers alongside the likes of Erling Haaland, Martin Ødegaard, Kristoffer Ajer and Sander Berge.

== Style of play ==
Bohinen plays primarily as a central midfielder, and has also occasionally played as a winger. He has been described as a skilful player with good technique and good vision. Eurosport also described that 'he also has the X-factor when it comes to his left foot'.

== Career statistics ==
As of match played 13 May 2025

Appearances and goals by club, season and competition
Club	Season	League			National cup (Note: Includes Norwegian Football Cup, Russian Cup, Coppa Italia)		Total	
Club	Season	Division	Apps	Goals	Apps	Goals	Apps	Goals
Stabæk	2017	Eliteserien	3	0	3	0	6	0
Stabæk	2018	Eliteserien	11	0	1	0	12	0
Stabæk	2019	Eliteserien	29	4	2	0	31	4
Stabæk	2020	Eliteserien	24	5	0	0	24	5
Stabæk	Total		67	9	6	0	73	9
CSKA Moscow	2020–21	Russian Premier League	4	0	0	0	4	0
CSKA Moscow	2021–22	Russian Premier League	8	1	2	1	10	2
CSKA Moscow	Total		12	1	2	1	14	2
Salernitana (loan)	2021–22	Serie A	11	0	0	0	11	0
Salernitana	2022–23	Serie A	24	0	1	0	25	0
Salernitana	2023–24	Serie A	12	0	1	0	13	0
Salernitana	Total		47	0	2	0	49	0
Genoa (loan)	2023–24	Serie A	5	0	0	0	5	0
Genoa	2024–25	Serie A	3	0	1	0	4	0
Genoa	Total		3	0	1	0	4	0
Frosinone (loan)	2024–25	Serie B	12	3	0	0	12	3
Venezia	2025–26	Serie A	11	0	2	0	13	0
Cesena (loan)	2025–26	Serie B	0	0	0	0	0	0
Career total			156	13	11	1	165	14
