= Mathias Blårud =

Norwegian footballer (born 1995)

Personal information
- Date of birth: 6 June 1995 (age 31)
- Place of birth: Oslo, Norway
- Height: 1.82 m (6 ft 0 in)
- Position: Midfielder

Team information
- Current team: EB/Streymur
- Number: 8

Youth career
- Rommen
- 2010–2012: Vålerenga

Senior career*
| Years | Team | Apps | (Gls) |
| 2013–2014 | Vålerenga | 15 | (0) |
| 2015–2020 | Strømmen | 126 | (4) |
| 2020–2022 | Sogndal | 53 | (5) |
| 2022–2024 | Ullensaker/Kisa | 43 | (6) |
| 2024– | EB/Streymur | 11 | (0) |
- * Club domestic league appearances and goals as of 27 October 2024 ‡ National team caps and goals as of 5 May 2014

Mathias Blårud (born 6 June 1995) is a Norwegian football midfielder who currently plays for Faroe Islands Premier League side EB/Streymur.

He started his youth career in Rommen SK, and joined Vålerenga Fotball in 2010. He made his Norwegian Premier League debut in May 2013 against Tromsø.

== Career statistics ==
=== Club ===
As of match played 13 August 2022

Appearances and goals by club, season and competition
| Club | Season | League | | | National Cup | | Continental | | Total | |
| Club | Season | Division | Apps | Goals | Apps | Goals | Apps | Goals | Apps | Goals |
|---|---|---|---|---|---|---|---|---|---|---|
| Vålerenga | 2013 | Tippeligaen | 3 | 0 | 1 | 0 | — | | 4 | 0 |
| Vålerenga | 2014 | Tippeligaen | 12 | 0 | 2 | 0 | — | | 14 | 0 |
| Vålerenga | Total | | 15 | 0 | 3 | 0 | — | | 18 | 0 |
| Strømmen | 2015 | OBOS-ligaen | 25 | 1 | 4 | 0 | — | | 29 | 1 |
| Strømmen | 2016 | OBOS-ligaen | 24 | 2 | 2 | 0 | — | | 26 | 2 |
| Strømmen | 2017 | OBOS-ligaen | 24 | 1 | 1 | 0 | — | | 25 | 1 |
| Strømmen | 2018 | OBOS-ligaen | 25 | 0 | 2 | 0 | — | | 27 | 0 |
| Strømmen | 2019 | OBOS-ligaen | 28 | 0 | 4 | 0 | — | | 32 | 0 |
| Strømmen | 2020 | OBOS-ligaen | 0 | 0 | 0 | 0 | — | | 0 | 0 |
| Strømmen | Total | | 126 | 4 | 13 | 0 | — | | 139 | 4 |
| Sogndal | 2020 | OBOS-ligaen | 28 | 5 | 0 | 0 | — | | 28 | 5 |
| Sogndal | 2021 | OBOS-ligaen | 20 | 0 | 0 | 0 | — | | 20 | 0 |
| Sogndal | 2022 | OBOS-ligaen | 15 | 0 | 3 | 0 | — | | 18 | 0 |
| Sogndal | Total | | 53 | 5 | 3 | 0 | — | | 56 | 5 |
| Ullensaker/Kisa | 2022 | PostNord-ligaen | 2 | 0 | 0 | 0 | — | | 2 | 0 |
| Ullensaker/Kisa | Total | | 2 | 0 | 0 | 0 | — | | 2 | 0 |
| Career total | | | 196 | 9 | 19 | 0 | — | | 215 | 9 |
