= Steinar Strømnes =

Norwegian footballer (born 1987)

Personal information
- Full name: Steinar Ryen Strømnes
- Date of birth: 19 March 1987 (age 39)
- Height: 1.86 m (6 ft 1 in)
- Position: Defender

Youth career
- –2003: Hadeland
- 2003–2005: Vålerenga

Senior career*
Years	Team	Apps	(Gls)
2005–2007	Vålerenga	5	(0)
2007	→ HamKam (loan)	1	(0)
2007	→ Kongsvinger (loan)	7	(0)
2008–2009	Kongsvinger	52	(0)
2010	Lyn	10	(0)
2010–2011	Åtvidaberg	28	(0)
2012–2017	Strømmen	166	(8)
2018–2019	Stabæk	18	(0)
2020–2021	HamKam	49	(3)

International career
2005	Norway U-18	7	(0)
2006	Norway U-19	6	(0)
2006–2008	Norway U-21	15	(0)
- * Club domestic league appearances and goals as of 6 November 2021

Steinar Ryen Strømnes (born 19 March 1987) is a retired Norwegian footballer.

He hails from Roa, and moved from minnows Hadeland to top-tier Vålerenga in 2003. He enrolled at Wang Upper Secondary School and played for Vålerenga's youth team. He featured for the senior team as a half-time substitute in the 2005 Norwegian Football Cup—in a 10–2 thrashing of Hadeland—and started both legs in the 2005-06 UEFA Cup campaign against Steaua Bucuresti. In September 2006 he made his Norwegian Premier League debut against Start. He also made his debut for the Norway national under-21 football team.

In the spring of 2007 he was loaned out to HamKam, and in the summer he was loaned out to Kongsvinger. Ahead of the 2008 season he joined Kongsvinger permanently. Featuring scarcely in the 2009 Norwegian Premier League campaign, he went on to Lyn. However, the club went bankrupt after ten matches of the 2010 Norwegian First Division and Strømnes moved to Sweden and Åtvidaberg.

From 2012 to 2017 he played for Strømmen, amassing 166 league games and captaining the team. In December 2017 he moved to Bekkestua and soon after joined Stabæk.

After the end of the 2021 season, Strømnes announced his retirement.

== Career statistics ==
=== Club ===
As of match played 1 November 2021

Appearances and goals by club, season and competition
Club	Season	League			National Cup		Continental		Total	
Club	Season	Division	Apps	Goals	Apps	Goals	Apps	Goals	Apps	Goals
Vålerenga	2005	Tippeligaen	0	0	1	0	2	0	3	0
Vålerenga	2006	Tippeligaen	4	0	0	0	-		4	0
Vålerenga	2007	Tippeligaen	1	0	0	0	-		1	0
Vålerenga	Total		5	0	1	0	2	0	8	0
HamKam (loan)	2007	1. divisjon	1	0	0	0	-		1	0
HamKam (loan)	Total		1	0	0	0	-	-	1	0
Kongsvinger (loan)	2007	1. divisjon	7	0	0	0	-		7	0
Kongsvinger (loan)	Total		7	0	0	0	-	-	7	0
Kongsvinger	2008	1. divisjon	28	0	0	0	-		28	0
Kongsvinger	2009	1. divisjon	24	0	1	0	-		25	0
Kongsvinger	Total		52	0	1	0	-	-	53	0
Lyn	2010	1. divisjon	10	0	3	0	-		13	0
Lyn	Total		10	0	3	0	-	-	13	0
Åtvidaberg	2010	Allsvenskan	11	0	0	0	-		11	0
Åtvidaberg	2011	Superettan	17	0	0	0	-		17	0
Åtvidaberg	Total		28	0	0	0	-	-	28	0
Strømmen	2012	1. divisjon	27	0	1	0	-		28	0
Strømmen	2013	1. divisjon	29	2	1	0	-		30	2
Strømmen	2014	1. divisjon	26	1	3	0	-		29	1
Strømmen	2015	1. divisjon	29	2	4	0	-		33	2
Strømmen	2016	1. divisjon	29	2	3	0	-		32	2
Strømmen	2017	1. divisjon	26	1	1	0	-		27	1
Strømmen	Total		166	8	13	0	-	-	179	8
Stabæk	2018	Eliteserien	5	0	2	0	-		7	0
Stabæk	2019	Eliteserien	13	0	2	0	-		15	0
Stabæk	Total		18	0	4	0	-	-	22	0
HamKam	2020	1. divisjon	27	3	0	0	-		27	3
HamKam	2021	1. divisjon	16	0	0	0	-		16	0
HamKam	Total		43	3	0	0	-	-	43	3
Career total			330	11	22	0	2	0	354	11
