= 2023 Stabæk Fotball season =

Stabæk
2023 season
- Chairman: Espen Moe
- Head coach: Lars Bohinen (until 5 September); Bob Bradley (from 10 September)
- Stadium: Nadderud Stadion
- Eliteserien: 15th (relegated)
- 2022 Norwegian Cup: Semi-finals
- 2023 Norwegian Cup: Second round
- Top goalscorer: League: Mushaga Bakenga (9); All: Mushaga Bakenga (11)
Home colours	Away colours

The 2023 season was Stabæk Fotball's 100th season in existence and the club's first season return in the top flight of Norwegian football. In addition to the domestic league, Stabæk Fotball participated in this season's edition of the Norwegian Football Cup.

== Players ==
=== First team squad ===
As of 4 September 2023

Note: Flags indicate national team as defined under FIFA eligibility rules; some limited exceptions apply. Players may hold more than one non-FIFA nationality.

No.	Pos.	Nation	Player
1	GK	NOR	Marius Amundsen Ulla
2	DF	DEN	Kasper Pedersen
3	DF	NOR	Nicolai Næss
4	DF	NOR	Simen Wangberg (captain)
5	DF	NOR	Nicolas Pignatel Jenssen
7	MF	NOR	Fredrik Haugen
8	MF	ENG	Curtis Edwards
9	FW	NOR	Mushaga Bakenga
10	FW	NOR	Herman Geelmuyden
11	DF	NOR	Nikolas Walstad (on loan from Haugesund)
12	GK	NOR	Leander Larona Gunnerød
13	DF	DEN	Thor Lange
14	MF	NOR	Fredrik Krogstad
15	DF	NOR	Sturla Ottesen
16	FW	DEN	Luca Kjerrumgaard (on loan from OB)

No.	Pos.	Nation	Player
17	MF	NOR	Rasmus Eggen Vinge
18	MF	NOR	Gaute Høberg Vetti (on loan from Bodø/Glimt)
19	FW	SWE	Kevin Kabran
20	MF	NOR	Aleksander Andresen
21	GK	SWE	Isak Pettersson
22	FW	NOR	Philip Schie
23	MF	AUS	Keegan Jelacic (on loan from Gent)
24	MF	NOR	Kaloyan Kostadinov
25	DF	NOR	Filip Hornburg
26	FW	NGR	Paul Ogunkoya (on loan from Mahanaim FC)
31	DF	NOR	Olav Lilleøren Veum
33	DF	GER	Tobias Pachonik
36	DF	NOR	Fillip Jenssen Riise
69	FW	DEN	Kasper Høgh

== Transfers ==
=== Winter ===
In: Note: Flags indicate national team as defined under FIFA eligibility rules; some limited exceptions apply. Players may hold more than one non-FIFA nationality.

No.	Pos.	Nation	Player
6	DF	DEN	Andreas Skovgaard (from Brann)
7	MF	NOR	Fredrik Haugen (from Aalesund)
9	FW	NOR	Mushaga Bakenga (from (Japan) Tokushima Vortis)
11	DF	NOR	Nikolas Walstad (on loan from Haugesund)
12	GK	NOR	Leander Gunnerød (promoted from junior squad)
19	FW	SWE	Kevin Kabran (from Viking)
21	GK	SWE	Isak Pettersson (from (France) Toulouse)
22	FW	NOR	Philip Schie (promoted from junior squad)
33	DF	GER	Tobias Pachonik (free transfer)
36	DF	NOR	Fillip Jenssen Riise (promoted from junior squad)
47	MF	BRA	Jonatan Lucca (free transfer)
69	FW	DEN	Kasper Høgh (on loan from AaB)

Out: Note: Flags indicate national team as defined under FIFA eligibility rules; some limited exceptions apply. Players may hold more than one non-FIFA nationality.

No.	Pos.	Nation	Player
7	FW	NOR	Fitim Azemi (released)
9	FW	SWE	Adam Kaied (loan return to (Sweden) Helsingborg)
9	FW	NGR	Gift Orban (to (Belgium) Gent)
11	FW	NOR	Kornelius Normann Hansen (to (Netherlands) Almere City)
12	GK	SWE	Marcus Sandberg (to Hamkam)
18	MF	CAN	Patrick Metcalfe (to Fredrikstad)
19	DF	SWE	Victor Wernersson (loan return to (Belgium) Mechelen)
21	DF	NOR	Thomas Vold (released)
22	DF	NOR	Peder Vogt (to Bærum)
27	MF	CIV	Diabagate Mohamed Junior (loan return to (Ivory Coast) Issia Wazy)
–	DF	NOR	Kristoffer Lassen Harrison (to KFUM, previously on loan at Grorud)

=== Summer ===
In: Note: Flags indicate national team as defined under FIFA eligibility rules; some limited exceptions apply. Players may hold more than one non-FIFA nationality.

No.	Pos.	Nation	Player
16	FW	DEN	Luca Kjerrumgaard (on loan from (Denmark) OB)
17	FW	NOR	Rasmus Eggen Vinge (from Kjelsås)
18	MF	NOR	Gaute Vetti (on loan from Bodø/Glimt)
23	MF	AUS	Keegan Jelacic (on loan from (Belgium) Gent)
26	FW	NGR	Paul Ogunkoya (on loan from (Nigeria) Mahanaim)
69	FW	DEN	Kasper Høgh (from (Denmark) AaB, previously on loan)

Out: Note: Flags indicate national team as defined under FIFA eligibility rules; some limited exceptions apply. Players may hold more than one non-FIFA nationality.

No.	Pos.	Nation	Player
6	DF	DEN	Andreas Skovgaard (to (Poland) Cracovia)
39	FW	NOR	Marcus Seim-Monsen (to (Denmark) Nordsjælland)
47	MF	BRA	Jonatan Lucca (to (Portugal) AVS)

== Pre-season and friendlies ==
Win Draw Loss Fixtures

4 March 2023 Friendly	Stabæk (Norway)	1–0	(Norway) Mjøndalen	Sandvika
14:00 CET (UTC+1)				Stadium: AJ Arena

25 March 2023 Friendly	Kongsvinger (Norway)	1–1	(Norway) Stabæk	Kongsvinger
14:00 CET (UTC+1)				Stadium: Gjemselund Stadion

2 April 2023 Friendly	Sarpsborg 08 (Norway)	2–1	(Norway) Stabæk	Sarpsborg
15:00 CEST (UTC+2)	Baah 54'; Soltvedt 78'		Høgh 40'	Stadium: Sarpsborg Stadion

== Competitions ==
=== Overview ===
Competition	First match	Last match	Starting round	Final position	Record							
Competition	First match	Last match	Starting round	Final position	Pld	W	D	L	GF	GA	GD	Win %
Eliteserien	10 April 2023	3 December 2023	Matchday 1		30	7	8	15	30	48	−18	23.33
2022 Norwegian Cup	12 March 2023	26 April 2023	Fourth round	Semi-finals	3	1	1	1	6	3	+3	33.33
2023 Norwegian Cup	24 May 2023	1 June 2023	First round	Second round	2	1	0	1	5	3	+2	50.00
Total					35	9	9	17	41	54	−13	25.71

Last updated: 3 December 2023
Source: Soccerway

=== Eliteserien ===
==== League table ====
Pos	Team	Pld	W	D	L	GF	GA	GD	Pts	Qualification or relegation
12	Haugesund	30	9	6	15	34	40	−6	33	
13	Sandefjord	30	8	7	15	47	55	−8	31	
14	Vålerenga (R)	30	7	8	15	39	50	−11	29	Qualification for the relegation play-offs
15	Stabæk (R)	30	7	8	15	30	48	−18	29	Relegation to First Division
16	Aalesund (R)	30	5	3	22	23	73	−50	18	Relegation to First Division

Source: Football Association of Norway (in Norwegian)
Rules for classification: 1) Points; 2) Goal difference; 3) Goals scored; 4) Head-to-head points; 5) Head-to-head goal difference; 6) Head-to-head goals scored.
(R) Relegated

==== Results summary ====
Overall								Home						Away					
Pld	W	D	L	GF	GA	GD	Pts	W	D	L	GF	GA	GD	W	D	L	GF	GA	GD
30	7	8	15	30	48	−18	29	6	3	6	17	16	+1	1	5	9	13	32	−19

Last updated: 3 December 2023.

==== Results by round ====
Round	1	2	3	4	5	6	7	8	9	10	11	12	13	14	15	16	17	18	19	20	21	22	23	24	25	26	27	28	29	30
Ground	H	A	H	A	H	H	A	H	A	H	A	H	A	H	A	H	A	H	A	H	A	H	A	H	A	A	H	A	H	A
Result	D	L	W	W	D	W	L	W	L	D	L	L	D	L	L	L	L	L	L	W	L	L	D	W	D	D	L	D	W	L
Position	8	15	10	6	7	5	7	6	7	7	9	10	10	11	12	12	14	15	15	14	14	15	15	14	14	13	14	14	13	15

A = Away; H = Home; W = Win; D = Draw; L = Loss

==== Matches ====
The league fixtures were announced on 9 December 2022.

10 April 2023 1	Stabæk	0–0	Odd	Bærum
17:00 CEST (UTC+2)		Report		Stadium: Nadderud Stadion; Attendance: 3,308; Referee: Svein Tore Sinnes

16 April 2023 2	Bodø/Glimt	4–0	Stabæk	Bodø
17:00 CEST (UTC+2)	Pellegrino 3', 9', 54'; Grønbæk 23'	Report		Stadium: Aspmyra Stadion; Attendance: 6,583; Referee: Marius Hansen Grøtta

23 April 2023 3	Stabæk	3–0	Haugesund	Bærum
17:00 CEST (UTC+2)	Krusnell 20' (o.g.); Høgh 64'; Pedersen 80'	Report		Stadium: Nadderud stadion Attendance: 2,214; Referee: Marius Lien

30 April 2023 4	Molde	2–3	Stabæk	Molde
17:00 CEST (UTC+2)	Grødem 2'; Breivik 55'	Report	Høgh 16'; Hansen 23' (o.g.); Kabran 90+5'	Stadium: Aker Stadion; Attendance: 6,054; Referee: Sigurd Smehus Kringstad

7 May 2023 5	Stabæk	1–1	Sarpsborg 08	Bærum
17:00 CEST (UTC+2)	Ngouali 90' (o.g.)	Report	Utvik 87'	Stadium: Nadderud Stadion; Attendance: 2,866; Referee: Sivert Amland

13 May 2023 6	Stabæk	1–0	Aalesund	Bærum
17:00 CEST (UTC+2)	Kabran 76'	Report		Stadium: Nadderud Stadion; Attendance: 2,602; Referee: Tore Hansen

16 May 2023 7	Brann	4–1	Stabæk	Bergen
18:00 CEST (UTC+2)	Finne 30', 77'; Horn Myhre 36'; Heltne Nilsen 63'	Report	Høgh 35'	Stadium: Brann Stadion; Attendance: 16,832; Referee: Svein Oddvar Moen

29 May 2023 8	Stabæk	2–1	Vålerenga	Bærum
17:00 CEST (UTC+2)	Høgh 8'; Bakenga 34'	Report	Strandberg 84' (pen.)	Stadium: Nadderud Stadion; Attendance: 4,508; Referee: Rohit Saggi

4 June 2023 9	Lillestrøm	3–1	Stabæk	Lillestrøm
17:00 CEST (UTC+2)	Adams 13', 86' (pen.), 90+2'	Report	Bakenga 21' (pen.)	Stadium: Åråsen Stadion; Attendance: 5,823; Referee: Sivert Amland

11 June 2023 10	Stabæk	2–2	Rosenborg	Bærum
17:00 CEST (UTC+2)	Kostadinov 8'; Bakenga 10'	Report	Nelson 29'; Holse 89'	Stadium: Nadderud Stadion; Attendance: 4,938; Referee: Svein Oddvar Moen

25 June 2023 11	Tromsø	2–1	Stabæk	Tromsø
17:00 CEST (UTC+2)	Paintsil 15'; Erlien 35'	Report	Høgh 7'	Stadium: Romssa Arena; Attendance: 3,902; Referee: Jan Morten Tennøy

3 July 2023 12	Stabæk	0–1	Strømsgodset	Bærum
19:00 CEST (UTC+2)		Report	Leifsson 18'	Stadium: Nadderud Stadion; Attendance: 3,262; Referee: Daniel Higraff

9 July 2023 13	Sandefjord	0–0	Stabæk	Sandefjord
17:00 CEST (UTC+2)		Report		Stadium: Release Arena; Attendance: 2,994; Referee: Marius Hansen Grøtta

16 July 2023 14	Stabæk	0–1	Viking	Bærum
17:00 CEST (UTC+2)		Report	Bjarnason 90+1'	Stadium: Nadderud Stadion; Attendance: 3,009; Referee: Marius Lien

23 July 2023 15	HamKam	3–2	Stabæk	Hamar
17:00 CEST (UTC+2)	Kirkevold 32'; Onsrud 49'; Gammelby 90+4'	Report	Bakenga 51', 77'	Stadium: Briskeby Stadion; Attendance: 3,576; Referee: Sigurd Smehus Kringstad

29 July 2023 16	Stabæk	0–1	Molde	Bærum
18:00 CEST (UTC+2)		Report	Berisha 62' (pen.)	Stadium: Nadderud Stadion; Attendance: 3,235; Referee: Svein Oddvar Moen

6 August 2023 17	Odd	4–0	Stabæk	Skien
17:00 CEST (UTC+2)	Johansen 20'; Gjengaar 32'; Rekdal 60'; Tewelde 90+7'	Report		Stadium: Skagerak Arena; Attendance: 4,758; Referee: Svein Tore Sinnes

20 August 2023 19	Viking	1–0	Stabæk	Stavanger
17:00 CEST (UTC+2)	Brekalo 89'	Report		Stadium: Viking Stadion; Attendance: 14,256; Referee: Sivert Amland

3 September 2023 21	Strømsgodset	2–1	Stabæk	Drammen
17:00 CEST (UTC+2)	Stengel 17' (pen.); Valsvik 80'	Report	Wangberg 15'	Stadium: Marienlyst Stadion; Attendance: 5,149; Referee: Ajdin Medic

17 September 2023 22	Stabæk	0–1	Brann	Bærum
17:00 CEST (UTC+2)		Report	Finne 12'	Stadium: Nadderud Stadion; Attendance: 4,515; Referee: Marius Hansen Grøtta

23 September 2023 23	Aalesund	1–1	Stabæk	Ålesund
18:00 CEST (UTC+2)	Segberg 16'	Report	Kostadinov 45+1'	Stadium: Color Line Stadion; Attendance: 4,562; Referee: Mohammad Usman Aslam

30 September 2023 18	Stabæk	0–1	Tromsø	Bærum
17:00 CEST (UTC+2)		Report	Traore 50'	Stadium: Nadderud Stadion; Attendance: 3,119; Referee: Christian Moen

4 October 2023 20	Stabæk	5–2	HamKam	Bærum
19:00	Walstad 16'; Bakenga 30', 52'; Næss 58'; Edwards 66'	Report	Norheim 44'; Bjørlo 82'	Stadium: Nadderud Stadion; Attendance: 2,710; Referee: Daniel Higraff

8 October 2023 24	Stabæk	1–0	LillestrømV	Bærum
17:00 CEST (UTC+2)	Wangberg 73'	Report		Stadium: Nadderud Stadion; Attendance: 3,314; Referee: Svein Oddvar Moen

22 October 2023 25	Rosenborg	1–1	Stabæk	Trondheim
17:00 CEST (UTC+2)	Sæter 33'	Report	Bakenga 13'	Stadium: Lerkendal Stadion; Attendance: 13,127; Referee: Sigurd Kringstad

29 October 2023 26	Sarpsborg 08	2–2	Stabæk	Sarpsborg
17:00 CET (UTC+1)	Lundqvist 30'; Fardal Opseth 78'	Report	Ottesen 47'; Vinge 84'	Stadium: Sarpsborg Stadion; Attendance: 4,623; Referee: Daniel Higraff

5 November 2023 27	Stabæk	0–4	Bodø/Glimt	Bærum
17:00 CEST (UTC+1)		Report	Sørli 23'; Pemi 25'; Bjørkan 44'; Saltnes 90+2'	Stadium: Nadderud Stadion; Attendance: 3,707; Referee: Sivert Øksnes Amland

12 November 2023 28	Vålerenga	0–0	Stabæk	Oslo
17:00 CET (UTC+1)		Report		Stadium: Intility Arena; Attendance: 13,777; Referee: Svein Oddvar Moen

26 November 2023 29	Stabæk	2–1	Sandefjord	Bærum
17:00 CET (UTC+1)	Bakenga 8'; Kabran 90+6'	Report	Ruud Tveter 63' (pen.)	Stadium: Nadderud Stadion; Attendance: 3,615; Referee: Rohit Saggi

3 December 2023 30	Haugesund	3–0	Stabæk	Haugesund
17:00 CET (UTC+1)	Samuelsen 74'; Njie 77', 90+2'	Report		Stadium: Haugesund Stadion; Attendance: 5,061; Referee: Sigurd Smehus Kringstad

=== Norwegian Football Cup ===
==== 2022 ====
12 March 2023 Fourth round	Stabæk	5–0	Bryne	Bærum
15:00 CET (UTC+2)	Høgh 33', 51'; Andresen 48'; Bakenga 79'; Geelmuyden 83'	Report		Stadium: AJ Arena; Attendance: 689; Referee: Sigurd Smehus Kringstad

18 March 2023 Quarter-finals	Stabæk	1–1 (a.e.t.) (9–8 p)	Molde	Bærum
13:30 CET (UTC+2)	Høgh 84'	Report; Penalties	Berisha 30' (pen.)	Stadium: AJ Arena; Attendance: 900; Referee: Tore Hansen
	Penalties
	Geelmuyden (penalty missed); Bakenga (penalty scored); Haugen (penalty scored); Krogstad (penalty missed); Næss (penalty scored); Pettersson (penalty scored); Pedersen (penalty scored); Skovgaard (penalty scored); Edwards (penalty scored); Jenssen (penalty missed); Riise (penalty scored); Bakenga (penalty scored)		(penalty scored) Risa; (penalty missed) Brynhildsen; (penalty scored) Grødem; (penalty scored) Breivik; (penalty missed) Hansen; (penalty scored) Haugan; (penalty scored) Hagelskjær; (penalty scored) Linnes; (penalty scored) Karlstrøm; (penalty missed) Erling; (penalty scored) Ødegård; (penalty missed) Grødem

26 April 2023 Semi-finals	Stabæk	0–2	Brann	Bærum
18:00 CEST (UTC+2)		Report	Heggebø 20'; Finne 59'	Stadium: Nadderud Stadion; Attendance: 4,560; Referee: Rohit Saggi

==== 2023 ====
24 May 2023 First round	Åssiden	0–4	Stabæk	Drammen
18:30 CEST (UTC+2)		Report	Bakenga 11', 23'; Wendt 50'; Riise 66'	Stadium: Åssiden Stadion; Attendance: 274; Referee: Eivind Bodding

1 June 2023 Second round	Kjelsås	3–1	Stabæk	Oslo
18:00 CEST (UTC+2)	Walstad 16' (o.g.); Aslaksrud 21'; Willumsen 31'	Report	Jenssen 48'	Stadium: Grefsen Stadion; Attendance: 712; Referee: Ole-Alexander Ekeli Valen
