= 2023 Vålerenga Fotball season =

Vålerenga
2023 season
- Chairman: Thomas Baardseng
- Head coach: Dag-Eilev Fagermo (until 12 June); Jan Frode Nornes (interim) (12 June - 12 July); Geir Bakke (from 12 July)
- Stadium: Intility Arena
- Eliteserien: 14th (relegated)
- Norwegian Cup: Semi-finals
- Top goalscorer: League: Andrej Ilić (9); All: Andrej Ilić (11)
Home colours	Away colours	Third colours

The 2023 season was Vålerenga Fotball's 110th season in existence and the club's 22nd consecutive season in the top flight of Norwegian football. In addition to the domestic league, Vålerenga Fotball participated in this season's edition of the Norwegian Football Cup.

== Players ==
=== First-team squad ===
As of 4 September 2023

Note: Flags indicate national team as defined under FIFA eligibility rules; some limited exceptions apply. Players may hold more than one non-FIFA nationality.

No.	Pos.	Nation	Player
1	GK	NOR	Jacob Storevik
2	DF	NOR	Christian Borchgrevink
3	MF	NOR	Aleksander Hammer Kjelsen
4	DF	NOR	Stefan Strandberg
6	DF	NOR	Vegar Eggen Hedenstad
7	MF	NOR	Fredrik Oldrup Jensen
8	MF	NOR	Henrik Bjørdal
9	FW	NOR	Torgeir Børven
10	FW	NOR	Mohamed Ofkir
11	MF	FIN	Daniel Håkans
14	DF	NOR	Aaron Kiil Olsen
15	MF	NOR	Elias Hagen
17	FW	NOR	Jacob Eng

No.	Pos.	Nation	Player
18	DF	NOR	Simen Juklerød
19	FW	SRB	Andrej Ilić
20	MF	NOR	Magnus Bech Riisnæs
21	GK	NOR	Magnus Smelhus Sjøeng
22	MF	NOR	Stian Sjøvold Thorstensen
23	DF	AUT	Martin Kreuzriegler
24	MF	NOR	Petter Strand
26	FW	NOR	Filip Thorvaldsen
29	FW	BRA	Vitinho (on loan from Palmeiras)
30	GK	NOR	Storm Strand-Kolbjørnsen
31	FW	NOR	Omar Bully Drammeh
32	DF	NOR	Max Bjurstrøm
33	DF	ALB	Eneo Bitri

=== Out on loan ===
Note: Flags indicate national team as defined under FIFA eligibility rules; some limited exceptions apply. Players may hold more than one non-FIFA nationality.

No.	Pos.	Nation	Player
25	MF	NOR	Jones El-Abdellaoui (at KFUM Oslo until end of 2023)

== Transfers ==
=== Winter ===
In: Note: Flags indicate national team as defined under FIFA eligibility rules; some limited exceptions apply. Players may hold more than one non-FIFA nationality.

No.	Pos.	Nation	Player
1	GK	NOR	Jacob Storevik (from Sandefjord)
10	MF	NOR	Mohamed Ofkir (from Sandefjord)
11	MF	FIN	Daniel Håkans (from Jerv)
14	DF	NOR	Aaron Kiil Olsen (from KFUM)
22	MF	NOR	Stian Sjøvold Thorstensen (promoted from junior squad)
23	DF	NOR	Henrik Heggheim (on loan from (Denmark) Brøndby)
26	FW	NOR	Filip Thorvaldsen (promoted from junior squad)
29	FW	BRA	Vitinho (on loan from (Brazil) Palmeiras)
30	GK	NOR	Magnus Stær-Jensen (from Grorud)
31	MF	NOR	Omar Bully Drammeh (from Grorud)

Out: Note: Flags indicate national team as defined under FIFA eligibility rules; some limited exceptions apply. Players may hold more than one non-FIFA nationality.

No.	Pos.	Nation	Player
1	GK	NOR	Sondre Rossbach (loan return to Odd)
4	DF	NOR	Jonatan Tollås (retired)
10	FW	NOR	Osame Sahraoui (to (Netherlands) Heerenveen)
11	FW	TUN	Amor Layouni (on loan to (Australia) Western Sydney Wanderers)
14	FW	NOR	Henrik Udahl (to HamKam)
16	MF	NOR	Mathias Emilsen (on loan to Sandnes Ulf)
17	FW	NOR	Tobias Christensen (to (Hungary) Fehérvár)
23	DF	ISL	Brynjar Ingi Bjarnason (to Hamkam)

=== Summer ===
In: Note: Flags indicate national team as defined under FIFA eligibility rules; some limited exceptions apply. Players may hold more than one non-FIFA nationality.

No.	Pos.	Nation	Player
15	MF	NOR	Elias Kristoffersen Hagen (from (Sweden) IFK Göteborg)
19	FW	SRB	Andrej Ilić (from (Latvia) RFS)
23	DF	AUT	Martin Kreuzriegler (from (Poland) Widzew Lodz)
27	FW	NOR	Adrian Kurd Rønning (promoted from junior squad)
33	DF	ALB	Eneo Bitri (from (Czech Republic) Baník Ostrava)

Out: Note: Flags indicate national team as defined under FIFA eligibility rules; some limited exceptions apply. Players may hold more than one non-FIFA nationality.

No.	Pos.	Nation	Player
5	DF	MKD	Leonard Zuta (to (Sweden) Brommapojkarna)
11	FW	TUN	Amor Layouni (to (Sweden) Häcken, previously on loan at (Australia) Western Sydney Wanderers)
15	MF	NOR	Odin Thiago Holm (to (Scotland) Celtic)
16	MF	NOR	Mathias Emilsen (to Ranheim, previously on loan at Sandnes Ulf)
19	FW	NOR	Seedy Jatta (to (Austria) Sturm Graz)
23	DF	NOR	Henrik Heggheim (loan return to (Denmark) Brøndby)
33	MF	NOR	Jones El-Abdellaoui (on loan to KFUM)

== Pre-season and friendlies ==
Win Draw Loss Fixtures

22 January 2023 Friendly	Vålerenga (Norway)	1–1	(Denmark) AGF	Marbella, Spain
15:30 CET (UTC+1)	El-Abdellaoui 79'	Report	Anderson 16'	Stadium: Marbella Football Center

27 January 2023 Friendly	Vålerenga (Norway)	4–1	(Norway) Sarpsborg 08	Oslo
13:00 CET (UTC+1)	Bjørdal 42', 78'; Jatta 66'; Ofkir 80'	Report	Skålevik 46'	Stadium: Vallhall Arena

10 February 2023 Friendly	Vålerenga (Norway)	0–3	(Sweden) Malmö	Marbella, Spain
13:00 CET (UTC+1)		Report	Christiansen 8', 12', 32'	Stadium: Atalaya Football Center

17 February 2023 Friendly	Vålerenga (Norway)	2–0	(Norway) Moss	Marbella, Spain
16:00 CET (UTC+1)	Hoffmann 30' (o.g.); Strand 60'	Report		Stadium: Campo La Quinta

22 February 2023 Friendly	Vålerenga (Norway)	2–1	(Norway) Raufoss	Oslo
14:00 CET (UTC+1)	Jatta 20'; Ofkir 33'	Report	Mettler 3' (pen.)	Stadium: Intility Arena

3 March 2023 Friendly	Vålerenga (Norway)	1–3	(Norway) Brann	Oslo
14:30 CET (UTC+1)	Jatta 76'	Report	Rasmussen 3'; Heltne Nilsen 45+2' (pen.); Blomberg 65'	Stadium: Intility Arena

10 March 2023 Friendly	Vålerenga (Norway)	1–0	(Norway) Fredrikstad	Oslo
13:00 CET (UTC+1)	Riisnæs 41'	Report		Stadium: Intility Arena

17 March 2023 Friendly	Vålerenga (Norway)	3–2	(Norway) Strømsgodset	Oslo
12:30 CET (UTC+1)	Thiago Holm 3'; Strand 64'; Dicko Eng 73'	Report	Valsvik 34'; Ekeland 38'	Stadium: Intility Arena

25 March 2023 Friendly	Häcken (Sweden)	–	(Norway) Vålerenga	Gothenburg, Sweden
16:00 CET (UTC+1)		Report		Stadium: Bravida Arena

3 April 2023 Friendly	Vålerenga (Norway)	2–1	(Norway) Jerv	Oslo
15:00 CEST (UTC+2)	Bjørdal 16'; Dicko Eng 20'	Report	Wichne 56'	Stadium: Intility Arena

== Competitions ==
=== Overview ===
Competition	First match	Last match	Starting round	Final position	Record							
Competition	First match	Last match	Starting round	Final position	Pld	W	D	L	GF	GA	GD	Win %
Eliteserien	10 April 2023	3 December 2023	Matchday 1	14th	30	7	8	15	39	50	−11	23.33
Eliteserien relegation play-offs	7 December 2023	10 December 2023	First leg	Runners-up	2	1	0	1	2	2	+0	50.00
Norwegian Football Cup	25 May 2023	28 September 2023	First round	Semi-finals	6	5	0	1	15	7	+8	83.33
Total					38	13	8	17	56	59	−3	34.21

Source: Soccerway

=== Eliteserien ===
==== League table ====
Pos	Team	Pld	W	D	L	GF	GA	GD	Pts	Qualification or relegation
12	Haugesund	30	9	6	15	34	40	−6	33	
13	Sandefjord	30	8	7	15	47	55	−8	31	
14	Vålerenga (R)	30	7	8	15	39	50	−11	29	Qualification for the relegation play-offs
15	Stabæk (R)	30	7	8	15	30	48	−18	29	Relegation to First Division
16	Aalesund (R)	30	5	3	22	23	73	−50	18	Relegation to First Division

Source: Football Association of Norway (in Norwegian)
Rules for classification: 1) Points; 2) Goal difference; 3) Goals scored; 4) Head-to-head points; 5) Head-to-head goal difference; 6) Head-to-head goals scored.
(R) Relegated

==== Results summary ====
Overall								Home						Away					
Pld	W	D	L	GF	GA	GD	Pts	W	D	L	GF	GA	GD	W	D	L	GF	GA	GD
30	7	8	15	39	50	−11	29	2	4	9	19	29	−10	5	4	6	20	21	−1

Last updated: 3 December 2023.

==== Results by round ====
Round	1	2	3	4	5	6	7	8	9	10	11	12	13	14	15	16	17	18	19	20	21	22	23	24	25	26	27	28	29	30
Ground	A	H	A	H	A	A	H	A	H	H	A	H	A	H	A	H	A	H	A	H	A	H	A	H	A	H	A	H	A	H
Result	W	L	L	L	W	D	W	L	L	L	W	L	D	L	L	L	W	D	D	D	D	W	L	L	L	L	L	D	W	D
Position	5	11	12	14	11	10	8	10	10	13	11	12	12	13	14	14	12	13	12	12	12	11	11	12	13	14	15	15	15	14

A = Away; H = Home; W = Win; D = Draw; L = Loss

==== Matches ====
The league fixtures were announced on 9 December 2022.

10 April 2023 1	Aalesund	0–1	Vålerenga	Ålesund
17:00 CEST (UTC+2)	Kristensen (yellow card) 27'; Kolskogen (yellow card) 56'; Munksgaard (yellow card) 90+6'	Report	Zuta (yellow card) 43'; Håkans 79'	Stadium: Color Line Stadion; Attendance: 6,876; Referee: Kristoffer Hagenes

16 April 2023 2	Vålerenga	0–2	Sarpsborg 08	Oslo
19:15 CEST (UTC+2)	Ofkir (yellow card) 22'; Zuta (yellow card) 64'	Report	Lie Skålevik (yellow card) 38'; Fardal Opseth 60', 81'	Stadium: Intility Arena; Attendance: 9,060; Referee: Rohit Saggi

22 April 2023 3	Brann	3–1	Vålerenga	Bergen
18:00 CEST (UTC+2)	Børsting 6'; Heltne Nilsen 73' (pen.); Heggebø 79'	Report	Sery Larsen 15' (o.g.); Zuta (red card) 53'	Stadium: Brann Stadion; Attendance: 16,816; Referee: Tore Hansen

1 May 2023 4	Vålerenga	3–4	Lillestrøm	Oslo
18:00 CEST (UTC+2)	Håkans 7'; Bjørdal 27'; Jatta 30'; Juklerød (red card) 37'	Report	Lehne Olsen 17'; Adams 46', 90+6'; Åsen 89'	Stadium: Intility Arena; Attendance: 16,556; Referee: Kristoffer Hagenes

6 May 2023 5	Rosenborg	1–3	Vålerenga	Trondheim
18:00 CEST (UTC+2)	Bjørlo 47', (yellow card) 49'; Þorvaldsson (yellow card) 88'	Report	Ofkir 44', (yellow card) 85'; Jatta 50'; Bjørdal 71' (pen.); Oldrup Jensen (yellow card) 79'	Stadium: Lerkendal Stadion; Attendance: 14,654; Referee: Svein Oddvar Moen

13 May 2023 6	Haugesund	1–1	Vålerenga	Haugesund
19:15 CEST (UTC+2)	Njie 61'; Eskesen (yellow card) 71'	Report	Riisnæs 65'	Stadium: Haugesund Stadion; Attendance: 4,253; Referee: Sigurd Smehus Kringstad

16 May 2023 7	Vålerenga	3–0	HamKam	Oslo
18:00 CEST (UTC+2)	Jatta 18'; Håkans 24'; Bjørdal 45+2', (yellow card) 80'	Report		Stadium: Intility Arena; Attendance: 13,752; Referee: Mohammad Usman Aslam

29 May 2023 8	Stabæk	2–1	Vålerenga	Bærum
17:00 CEST (UTC+2)	Høgh 8'; Bakenga 34'; Krogstad (red card) 49'; Pettersson (yellow card) 77'; Pachonik (red card) 83'	Report	Strandberg 84' (pen.)	Stadium: Nadderud Stadion; Attendance: 4,508; Referee: Rohit Saggi

4 June 2023 9	Vålerenga	1–3	Bodø/Glimt	Oslo
17:00 CEST (UTC+2)	Oldrup Jensen (yellow card) 57'; El-Abdellaoui 90'	Report	Moumbagna (yellow card) 20', (goal) 31', 67'; Pellegrino 48'; Vetlesen (yellow card) 63'	Stadium: Intility Arena; Attendance: 12,018; Referee: Tore Hansen

11 June 2023 10	Vålerenga	0–1	Strømsgodset	Oslo
17:00 CEST (UTC+2)	Thiago Holm (yellow card) 39'; Bjørdal (yellow card) 67'; Strandberg (yellow card) 76'	Report	Therkelsen (yellow card) 20'; Danso (yellow card) 62'; Stengel 68' (pen.); Gulliksen (yellow card) 76'	Stadium: Intility Arena; Attendance: 7,578; Referee: Svein Tore Sinnes

1 July 2023 12	Vålerenga	1–2	Viking	Oslo
18:00 CEST (UTC+2)	Oldrup Jensen (yellow card) 21' (red card) 90+5'; Juklerød (yellow card) 61'; Ofkir (yellow card) 74'; Strandberg 85' (pen.)	Report	Yazbek (yellow card) 17'; Salvesen 19'; Brekalo (yellow card) 31'; Diop (yellow card) 82'; Tripić (yellow card) 83'; Solbakken (yellow card) 83'; Jensen (yellow card) 84'; D'Agostino (yellow card) 90+4'; Sandberg 90+7'	Stadium: Intility Arena; Attendance: 8,977; Referee: Mohammad Usman Aslam

9 July 2023 13	Tromsø	0–0	Vålerenga	Tromsø
17:00 CEST (UTC+2)	Diouf (yellow card) 84'	Report	Riisnæs (yellow card) 48'; Zuta (yellow card) 65'	Stadium: Romssa Arena; Attendance: 4,406; Referee: Tore Hansen

15 July 2023 14	Vålerenga	0–4	Molde	Oslo
18:00 CEST (UTC+2)	Hedenstad (yellow card) 90+3'	Report	Kitolano 1'; Haugen 41'; Eriksen 45'; Breivik 55' (pen.), (yellow card) 64'	Stadium: Intility Arena; Attendance: 8,779; Referee: Daniel Higraff

23 July 2023 15	Odd	2–1	Vålerenga	Skien
17:00 CEST (UTC+2)	Juklerød 33' (o.g.); Ruud 81' (pen.)	Report	Juklerød 49'; Eggen Hedenstad (yellow card) 60' (yellow-red card) 79'	Stadium: Skagerak Arena; Attendance: 5,604; Referee: Sivert Øksnes Amland

29 July 2023 16	Vålerenga	2–3	Sandefjord	Oslo
15:30 CEST (UTC+2)	Jatta 52'; Bjørdal (yellow card) 62'; Strand 90'; Borchgrevink (yellow card) 90+2'	Report	Ottosson 63'; Al-Saed 72'; Nyenetue (yellow card) 76', (goal) 90+4'; Nilsson (yellow card) 90+3'	Stadium: Intility Arena; Attendance: 9,902; Referee: Rohit Saggi

5 August 2023 17	Strømsgodset	1–3	Vålerenga	Drammen
18:00 CEST (UTC+2)	Brunes 8'	Report	Håkans 45+2'; Ofkir 50', (yellow card) 55'; Riisnæs (yellow card) 55'; Jatta 77', (yellow card) 78'	Stadium: Marienlyst Stadion; Attendance: 6,860; Referee: Marius Hansen Grøtta

13 August 2023 18	Vålerenga	1–1	Haugesund	Oslo
19:15 CEST (UTC+2)	Strand 71'; Jatta (yellow card) 77'	Report	Diarra 7'; Eskesen (yellow card) 41'; Niyukuri (yellow card) 53'; Fredriksen (yellow card) 64'; Solheim (yellow card) 80'	Stadium: Intility Arena; Attendance: 7,785; Referee: Tore Hansen

19 August 2023 19	Molde	0–0	Vålerenga	Molde
18:00 CEST (UTC+2)	Haugan (yellow card) 39' (yellow-red card) 90+7'; Løvik (yellow card) 63'	Report	Børven (yellow card) 74'; Storevik (yellow card) 87'	Stadium: Aker Stadion; Attendance: 6,468; Referee: Svein Tore Sinnes

27 August 2023 20	Vålerenga	2–2	Odd	Oslo
17:00 CEST (UTC+2)	Solholm Johansen 19' (o.g.); Bitri 39'	Report	Gjengaar 8'; Midtskogen 67'; Mugeese (yellow card) 84'; Ruud (yellow card) 90'	Stadium: Intility Arena; Attendance: 8,368; Referee: Kristoffer Hagenes

2 September 2023 21	Viking	1–1	Vålerenga	Stavanger
18:00 CEST (UTC+2)	Bitri 63' (o.g.)	Report	Riisnæs (yellow card) 18'; Brochgrevink 86'; Oldrup Jensen (yellow card) 90+5'	Stadium: Viking Stadion; Attendance: 14,675; Referee: Tore Hansen

17 September 2023 22	Vålerenga	3–1	Aalesund	Oslo
19:15 CEST (UTC+2)	Ilić 17', 54'; Hagen 50'	Report	Melland (yellow card) 7'; Ramsland 13'; Segberg (yellow card) 86'	Stadium: Intility Arena; Attendance: 7,769; Referee: Kai Erik Steen

24 September 2023 23	Bodø/Glimt	4–2	Vålerenga	Bodø
17:00 CEST (UTC+2)	Pellegrino 2' (pen.), 15', 59' (pen.), 90+2'	Report	Børven 7'; Bitri (yellow card) 57'; Ilić 63'	Stadium: Aspmyra Stadion; Attendance: 7,388; Referee: Svein Oddvar Moen

1 October 2023 11	Sandefjord	1–2	Vålerenga	Sandefjord
17:00 CEST (UTC+2)	Al-Saed 68'	Report	Ilić 40'; Borchgrevink (yellow card) 52'; Strandberg 56' (pen.); Juklerød (yellow card) 72'	Stadium: Release Arena; Attendance: 4,905; Referee: Marius Hansen Grøtta

8 October 2023 24	Vålerenga	1–2	Brann	Oslo
19:15 CEST (UTC+2)	Ilić 7'; Hagen (yellow card) 68'; Juklerød (red card) 72'	Report	Børsting 31'; Soltvedt 57'; Finne (red card) 66'	Stadium: Intility Arena; Attendance: 10,011; Referee: Sigurd Smehus Kringstad

22 October 2023 25	Lillestrøm	2–0	Vålerenga	Lillestrøm
14:30 CEST (UTC+2)	Roseth 27'; Skogvold (yellow card) 64'; Bolly 69'	Report	Bitri (yellow card) 24'	Stadium: Åråsen Stadion; Attendance: 10,540; Referee: Rohit Saggi

29 October 2023 26	Vålerenga	1–3	Rosenborg	Oslo
19:13 CET (UTC+1)	Ilić 31'; Bitri (yellow card) 32'; Hagen (yellow card) 68'	Report	Þorvaldsson 12'; Nelson 14' (yellow card) 14'; Sæter 76'; Tangvik (yellow card) 84'	Stadium: Intility Arena; Attendance: 10,892; Referee: Tore Hansen

5 November 2023 27	Sarpsborg 08	3–2	Vålerenga	Sarpsborg
17:00 CET (UTC+1)	Maigaard 7', 41'; Sandberg 30'; Berget (yellow card) 47'	Report	Ilić 26'; Bjørdal (yellow card) 35'; Borchgrevink (yellow card) 42'; Kiil Olsen 81'	Stadium: Sarpsborg Stadion; Attendance: 4,623; Referee: Daniel Higraff

12 November 2023 28	Vålerenga	0–0	Stabæk	Oslo
17:00 CET (UTC+1)	Oldrup Jensen (yellow card) 63'	Report	Krogstad (yellow card) 16'	Stadium: Intility Arena; Attendance: 13,777; Referee: Svein Oddvar Moen

26 November 2023 29	HamKam	0–2	Vålerenga	Hamar
17:00 CET (UTC+1)	Bjørlo (yellow card) 18'; Udahl (yellow card) 20'; Sjølstad (yellow card) 45'	Report	Strandberg (yellow card) 52'; Ilić 82'; Håkans 90+4'	Stadium: Briskeby Stadion; Attendance: 6,321; Referee: Kai Erik Steen

3 December 2023 30	Vålerenga	1–1	Tromsø	Oslo
17:00 CET (UTC+1)	Ilić 63'	Report	Yttergård Jenssen (yellow card) 28'; Romsaas 90+3'	Stadium: Intility Arena; Attendance: 12,899; Referee: Tore Hansen

==== Relegation play-offs ====
6 December 2023 First leg	Kristiansund	0–2	Vålerenga	Kristiansund
19:00 CET (UTC+1)	Willumsson (yellow card) 20'; Strand Nilsen (yellow card) 64'; Sivertsen (yellow card) 77'	Report	Håkans 65'; Juklerød 86'; Strandberg (yellow card) 90+4'	Stadium: Kristiansund Stadion; Attendance: 4,042; Referee: Rohit Saggi

10 December 2023 Second leg	Vålerenga	0–2 (a.e.t.) (2–2 agg.) (4–5 p)	Kristiansund	Oslo
17:00 CET (UTC+1)	Strandberg (yellow card) 90+2'; Bjørdal (yellow card) 105'	Report	Jarl (yellow card) 52'; Rakneberg 76'; Broholm 82'	Stadium: Intility Arena; Attendance: 10,459; Referee: Svein Oddvar Moen
	Penalties
	Børven (penalty scored); Bjørdal (penalty scored); Ofkir (penalty scored); Ilić (penalty scored); Borchgrevink (penalty missed)		(penalty scored) Stokke; (penalty scored) Willumsson; (penalty scored) Broholm; (penalty scored) Ulvestad; (penalty scored) Aasbak

=== Norwegian Football Cup ===
25 May 2023 First round	Råde	0–1	Vålerenga	Råde
18:00 CEST (UTC+2)	Agu (yellow card) 64'; Kind Mikalsen (yellow card) 74'	Report	Eng 19'; Hammer Kjelsen (yellow card) 58'	Stadium: Råde idrettspark Attendance: 1,723; Referee: Jørgen Haugen

1 June 2023 Second round	Lyn	1–2	Vålerenga	Oslo
19:00 CEST (UTC+2)	Friberg Skaug 48'; Randers (yellow card) 90'	Report	Laajab 28' (o.g.); Ofkir 86'	Stadium: Bislett Stadium; Attendance: 7,777; Referee: Harald Vollstad Sletner

7 June 2023 Third round	Sotra	0–2	Vålerenga	Sotra
19:00 CEST (UTC+2)	Tørum (yellow card) 78'	Report	Børven 17'; Ofkir 21'; Bjørdal (yellow card) 89'	Stadium: Straume Idrettspark; Attendance: 800; Referee: Svein Oddvar Moen

28 June 2023 Fourth round	Stjørdals-Blink	0–5	Vålerenga	Stjørdalshalsen
18:00 CEST (UTC+2)		Report	Hammer Kjelsen 6'; Oldrup Jensen 45'; Børven (yellow card) 53', (goal) 76'; Riisnæs 67'; Bjørdal 86'	Stadium: M.U.S Stadion Sandskogan; Attendance: 1,603; Referee: Marius Hansen Grøtta

12 July 2023 Quarter-finals	Vålerenga	3–2	Brann	Oslo
20:00 CEST (UTC+2)	Jatta 13'; Riisnæs (yellow card) 43'; Ofkir 60', 66'; Eng (yellow card) 90+2'	Report	Larsen 5'; Finne 6'; Pedersen (red card) 88'	Stadium: Intility Arena; Attendance: 7,833; Referee: Svein Oddvar Moen

28 September 2023 Semi-finals	Vålerenga	2–4	Bodø/Glimt	Oslo
19:00 CEST (UTC+2)	Riisnæs (yellow card) 12'; Ilić 15', 59'; Hagen (yellow card) 26'	Report	Saltnes 3'; Moumbagna 56', 86'; Grønbæk (yellow card) 57'; Gulliksen (yellow card) 63'; Sørensen 90+5'	Stadium: Intility Arena; Attendance: 10,863; Referee: Tore Hansen
