= Bjørn Helge Riise =

Norwegian footballer (born 1983)

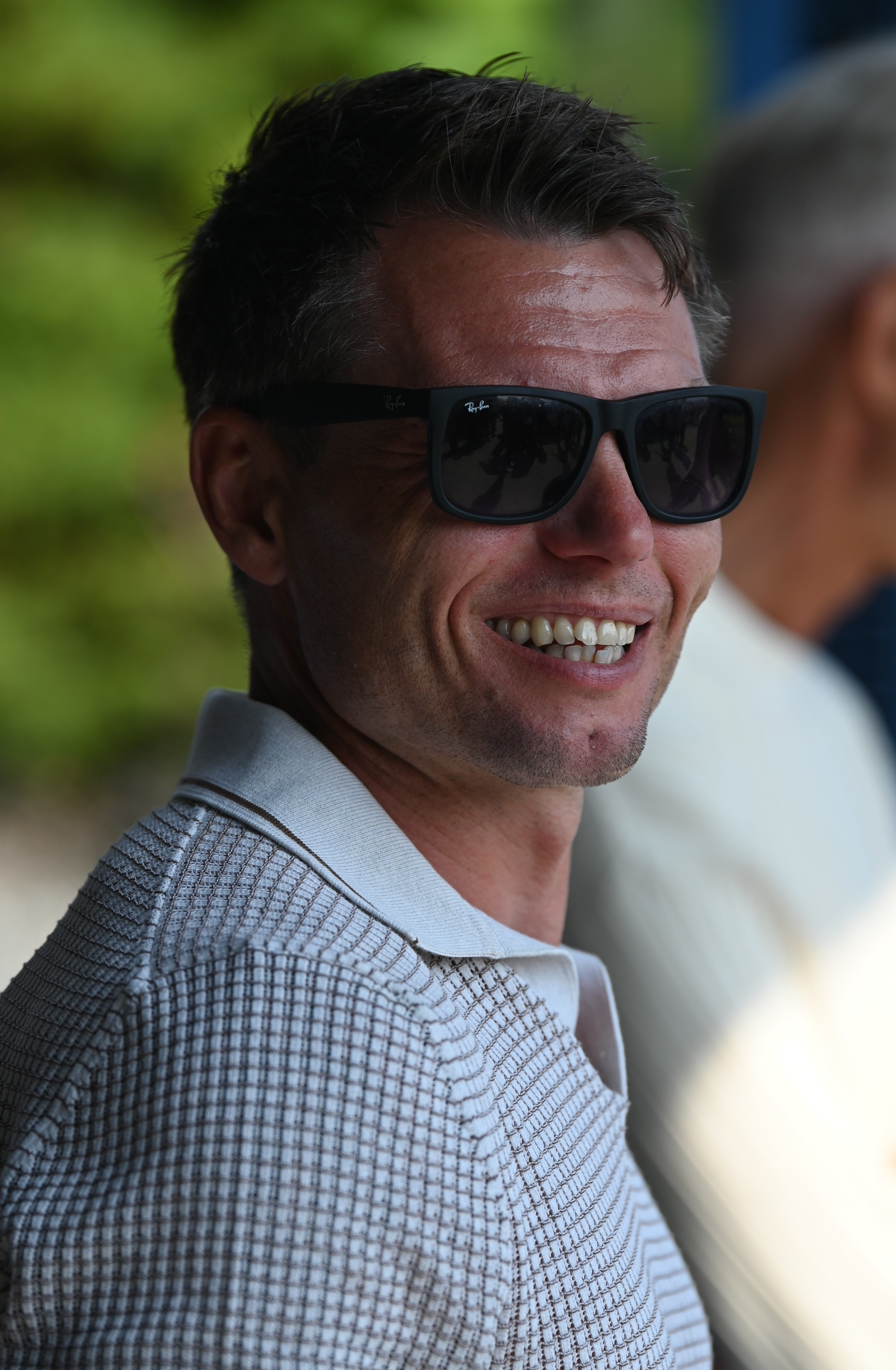
- Riise in 2026

Personal information
- Full name: Bjørn Helge Semundseth Riise
- Date of birth: 21 June 1983 (age 43)
- Place of birth: Ålesund, Norway
- Height: 1.74 m (5 ft 9 in)
- Position: Central midfielder

Youth career
- Hessa

Senior career*
Years	Team	Apps	(Gls)
2000–2003	Aalesund	49	(5)
2003–2005	Standard Liège	17	(0)
2004–2005	→ Brussels (loan)	31	(2)
2005–2009	Lillestrøm	86	(10)
2009–2012	Fulham	15	(0)
2011	→ Sheffield United (loan)	13	(1)
2011	→ Portsmouth (loan)	2	(0)
2012–2015	Lillestrøm	82	(7)
2015–2018	Aalesund	55	(3)
2018	Sogndal	8	(0)
2019	Stabæk 2	4	(1)
2023	Stabæk 2	1	(0)
Total		363	(29)

International career
2004–2005	Norway U21	16	(5)
2006–2013	Norway	35	(1)

Managerial career
- 2024: Stabæk (caretaker)
- 2024–2025: Stabæk (assistant)
- 2025: Stabæk (caretaker)
- * Club domestic league appearances and goals

Bjørn Helge Semundseth Riise (born 21 June 1983) is a Norwegian football coach and former professional footballer who is an assistant coach at Strømsgodset. Riise played either a central midfielder or a right winger, and earned 35 international caps for Norway. He played for Fulham of the Premier League from July 2009 to August 2012. He is the younger brother of former Liverpool and Fulham player John Arne Riise, also a Norwegian international.

== Club career ==
=== Aalesund ===
Early in his career, Riise was linked with several clubs, including Manchester City and Cardiff City, but deals failed to materialize. Riise threatened to retire after the Cardiff deal fell through due to complications with Aalesund, his club at the time, stating "I don't understand what Aalesund want from me. I almost want to quit football because it's not fun anymore". Riise spent the 2002 season on loan at Viking FK before moving to Belgium.

=== Standard Liège ===
In January 2003, Riise signed a three-year deal with Standard Liège, after impressing on a trial that included two reserve team appearances. He became teammates with fellow Norwegian Ole Martin Årst.

=== Brussels ===
After playing only 17 matches for Standard Liège, he was loaned out to Brussels. When his contract expired, Brussels would have a call option on him. However, there were transfer talks between Brussels and Brann, according to Belgian newspaper Het Nieuwsblad.

=== Lillestrøm ===
Riise returned to Norway with Lillestrøm in the summer of 2005, where he signed a three-and-a-half-year deal. He made his debut for Lillestrøm on 3 July against Molde.

=== Fulham ===
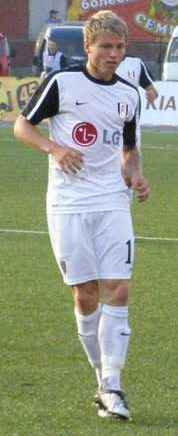
Riise playing for Fulham in 2009

In July 2009, Norwegian media reported that Riise was to join international teammates Brede Hangeland and Erik Nevland at Fulham, for a fee believed to be around £2 million. Riise subsequently signed a three-year deal for an undisclosed fee.

He made his Fulham début in a Europa League tie against FK Vetra coming on as a 78th-minute substitute for Zoltan Gera. Fulham won the match 3–0, winning the tie 6–0 on aggregate. He played regularly throughout the season under Roy Hodgson, especially in the Europa League.

His contract at Fulham was not extended in the summer of 2012, and was free to leave the club. Riise left during May/June.

==== On loan to Sheffield United ====
The following season, however, he found first team football much harder to come by under new boss Mark Hughes and by February 2011 he opted to move on loan to Sheffield United for the remainder of the season. Whilst at Bramall Lane he scored his first goal in English football, in a 2–0 win over Leeds United. With the Blades struggling he could not help to prevent them from being relegated at the end of the season and returned to Craven Cottage having played thirteen times for the Yorkshire club.

==== Loan to Portsmouth ====
Riise joined Portsmouth on a short-term loan on 26 September 2011.

=== Return to Lillestrøm ===
On 28 July 2012, Riise was presented as a new Lillestrøm player during half time in their home game with Molde.

=== Return to Aalesund ===
After three years at Lillestrøm he signed a contract for Aalesund, the club of his hometown and where he started his career.

=== Sogndal ===
On 16 August he signed for Norwegian club Sogndal Fotball only one day after his contract in Aalesund expired.

Riise retired after the 2018 season. He joined Stabæk as a coach and featured sparsely for its B team.

== Coaching career ==
After retiring as a player following the 2018 season, Riise joined Stabæk in 2019 as a coach for the club's under-14 team. Later that year, he became head coach of the under-19 team and Stabæk 2, a role he held for five years. In August 2024, he was appointed of player development in Stabæk's academy.

In September 2024, after Stabæk and Bob Bradley parted ways, Riise was appointed caretaker head coach for the remainder of the season. He became an assistant coach ahead of the 2025 season and later served a second spell as caretaker head coach before moving into a scouting role. In January 2026, he joined Strømsgodset as an assistant coach.

== International career ==
He earned his first cap for Norway in a Euro 2008 qualifying match against Malta which Norway won 4–0. He provided three assists in the game which saw his brother John Arne Riise score a goal. Riise earned his first goal for Norway in another qualifying match against Bosnia and Herzegovina. Norway won 2–0, with Riise scoring the second goal of the game.

== Personal life ==
Riise is married to long-term partner, Lena Jenssen – like his brother, he married in the summer of 2010. The couple have three sons, Noah, Fillip and Levi.

== Career statistics ==
=== Club ===
As of 10 November 2018

Appearances and goals by club, season and competition
Season	Club	League			Cup		Total	
Season	Club	Division	Apps	Goals	Apps	Goals	Apps	Goals
Lillestrøm	2005	Tippeligaen	13	0	3	0	16	0
Lillestrøm	2006	Tippeligaen	25	1	3	1	28	2
Lillestrøm	2007	Tippeligaen	24	3	7	1	31	4
Lillestrøm	2008	Tippeligaen	9	0	1	0	10	0
Lillestrøm	2009	Tippeligaen	15	6	2	0	17	6
Fulham	2009–10	Premier League	12	0	4	0	16	0
Fulham	2010–11	Premier League	3	0	0	0	3	0
Fulham	2011–12	Premier League	0	0	0	0	0	0
Sheffield United (loan)	2010–11	The Championship	13	1	0	0	13	1
Portsmouth (loan)	2011–12	The Championship	2	0	0	0	2	0
Lillestrøm	2012	Tippeligaen	11	2	0	0	11	2
Lillestrøm	2013	Tippeligaen	29	5	6	1	35	6
Lillestrøm	2014	Tippeligaen	27	0	1	0	28	0
Lillestrøm	2015	Tippeligaen	15	0	0	0	15	0
Aalesund	2015	Tippeligaen	13	0	0	0	13	0
Aalesund	2016	Tippeligaen	24	2	3	0	27	2
Aalesund	2017	Eliteserien	16	1	1	0	17	1
Aalesund	2018	OBOS-ligaen	4	0	1	0	5	0
Sogndal	2018	OBOS-ligaen	5	0	0	0	5	0
Career total			268	21	31	3	299	24

=== International ===
Scores and results list Norway's goal tally first, score column indicates score after each Riise goal.

List of international goals scored by Bjørn Helge Riise
No.	Date	Venue	Opponent	Score	Result	Competition
1	17 October 2007	Koševo Stadium, Sarajevo, Bosnia and Herzegovina	Bosnia and Herzegovina		2–0	UEFA Euro 2008 qualification

== Honours ==
Fulham

- UEFA Europa League runner-up: 2009–10

Individual

- Eliteserien top assist provider: 2014
