= 2023 Norwegian Football Cup =

Tournament details
- Country: Norway
- Dates: 22 May – 9 December 2023
- Teams: 128 (competition proper)

Final positions
- Champions: Molde
- Runners-up: Bodø/Glimt

Tournament statistics
- Matches played: 126
- Goals scored: 514 (4.08 per match)
- Top goal scorer(s): Bård Finne (8 goals)

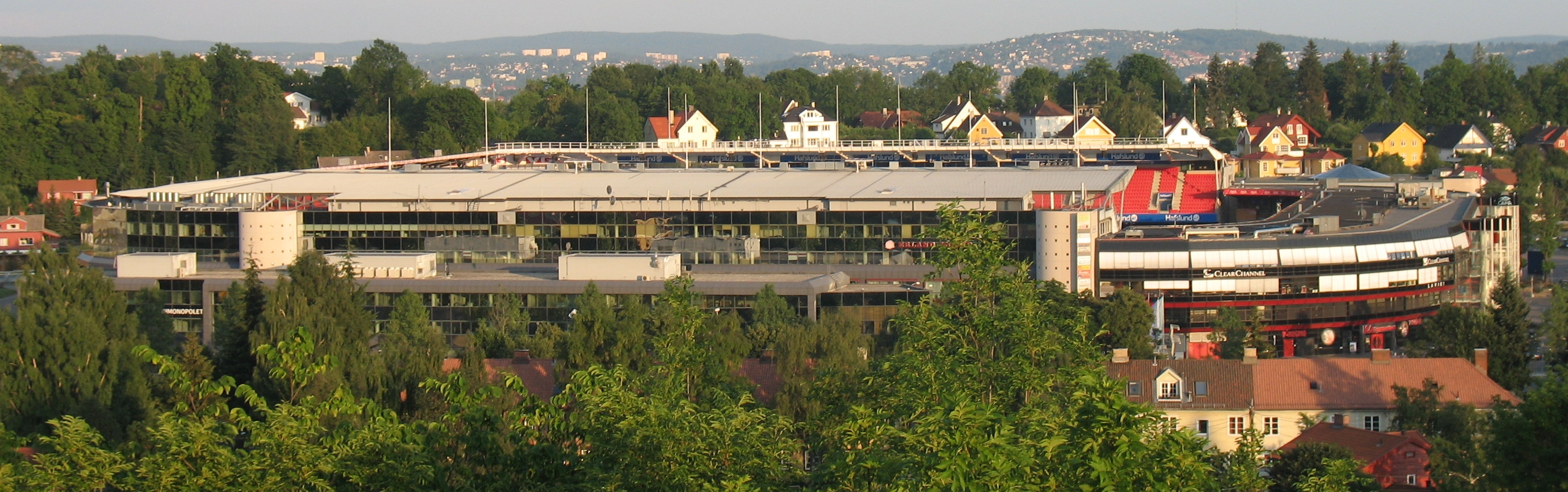
Ullevaal Stadion, Oslo - venue for the Norwegian Cup final

The 2023 Norwegian Football Cup was the 117th season of the Norwegian annual knock-out football tournament. It started on 22 May 2023 and finished on 9 December 2023. The winners qualified for the 2024–25 Europa League first qualifying round.

Molde won the cup with a 1–0 win over Bodø/Glimt, their sixth Norwegian Football Cup win.

== Calendar ==
Below are the dates for each round as given by the official schedule:

Round	Main date	Number of fixtures	Clubs
First round	24 May 2023	64	128 → 64
Second round	1 June 2023	32	64 → 32
Third round	7 June 2023	16	32 → 16
Fourth round	28 June 2023	8	16 → 8
Quarter-finals	12 July 2023	4	8 → 4
Semi-finals	27–28 September 2023	2	4 → 2
Final	9 December 2023	1	2 → 1

== First round ==
The pair-ups for the first round were announced on 12 April 2023.

Number of teams per tier entering this round
Eliteserien (1)	1. divisjon (2)	2. divisjon (3)	3. divisjon (4)	4. divisjon (5)	Total
16 / 16	16 / 16	24 / 28	48 / 84	24 / 272	128 / 416

22 May 2023	Follo (4)	2–2 (a.e.t.) (2–4 p)	(3) Kjelsås	Ski
18:00 CEST (UTC+2)	Hennig 72'; Tomas 75'	Report	Vinge 47'; Olafsen 50'	Stadium: Ski Stadion; Attendance: 207; Referee: Satha Sejoohn Sritharan

23 May 2023	Alta (3)	7–0	(5) Bossekop	Alta
18:00 CEST (UTC+2)	Suhr-Stamnes 35', 52'; Andersen 42', 45'; Reginiussen 45'; Abelsen 62'; Myreng 82' (o.g.)	Report		Stadium: SmartDok Arena; Attendance: 320; Referee: Kristian Kristiansen

23 May 2023	Lysekloster (4)	1–0	(4) Os	Lysekloster
18:00 CEST (UTC+2)	Dang 32' (o.g.)	Report		Stadium: Lysekloster Family Arena; Attendance: 697; Referee: Bjørn Tore Tvedt

23 May 2023	Nordstrand (4)	0–1	(3) Lyn	Oslo
18:00 CEST (UTC+2)		Report	Hylen 35'	Stadium: Nordstrand kunstgress Attendance: 850; Referee: Arjon Shaqiri

23 May 2023	Finnsnes (5)	1–3	(4) Skjervøy	Finnsnes
19:30 CEST (UTC+2)	Sandvik 15'	Report	Hustad 52'; Skallebø 80'; Celius 84'	Stadium: Finnsnes Stadion; Referee: Michael Wikestad Pedersen

24 May 2023	Rana (4)	0–2	(3) Stjørdals-Blink	Mo i Rana
16:30 CEST (UTC+2)		Report	Hermanstad 10'; Fossli 59'	Stadium: Sagbakken Stadion; Attendance: 371; Referee: Martin Berg

24 May 2023	HIF/Stein (4)	0–8	(1) Tromsø	Hammerfest
17:00 CEST (UTC+2)		Report	Hjertø-Dahl 9', 45'; Traoré 13', 54'; Hafstad 29', 63'; Romsaas 34', 88'	Stadium: Vår Energi Arena; Attendance: 600; Referee: Magnus H. Tjelle

24 May 2023	Kråkerøy (5)	1–2	(3) Kvik Halden	Kråkerøy
18:00 CEST (UTC+2)	Engebretsen 55'	Report	Jatta 38', 44'	Stadium: Kråkerøy Stadion; Attendance: 350; Referee: Aland Bazaz

24 May 2023	Sprint-Jeløy (4)	0–3	(2) Fredrikstad	Moss
18:00 CEST (UTC+2)		Report	Skaret 10'; Williams 28'; Drage 79'	Stadium: Bellevue kunstgress Attendance: 650; Referee: Mohammad Hafezi

24 May 2023	Drøbak-Frogn (5)	1–2 (a.e.t.)	(2) Moss	Drøbak
18:00 CEST (UTC+2)	Semmen 29'	Report	Kalabatama 88'; Callaku 105'	Stadium: Seiersten Stadion; Referee: Ole-Alexander E. Valen

24 May 2023	Holmlia (5)	0–2	(2) Skeid	Oslo
18:00 CEST (UTC+2)		Report	Nordengen 14'; Buduson 34'	Stadium: Lusetjern kunstgress Referee: Abdulhadi Al-Fahad

24 May 2023	Heming (5)	0–1 (a.e.t.)	(1) Strømsgodset	Oslo
18:00 CEST (UTC+2)		Report	Brunes 100'	Stadium: Hemingbanen; Referee: André B. Birkeland

24 May 2023	Skjetten (4)	0–3	(3) Grorud	Skjetten
18:00 CEST (UTC+2)		Report	Elmi 12'; Hristov 45'; Sereba 74'	Stadium: Skjetten Stadion; Referee: Markus R. Hammarstrøm

24 May 2023	Gjelleråsen (4)	2–1	(4) Lørenskog	Nittedal
18:00 CEST (UTC+2)	Bjørndalen 26'; Nygård 40'	Report	Kadri 38'	Stadium: Li kunstgress Referee: Robert J. Krolikowski

24 May 2023	Eidsvold Turn (4)	2–2 (a.e.t.) (3–4 p)	(3) Strømmen	Eidsvoll
18:00 CEST (UTC+2)	Hokstad 57'; Weaas 117'	Report	Gjelsvik 12'; Myhre 100'	Stadium: Myhrer Stadion; Attendance: 308; Referee: Christoffer D. Bergstuen
	Penalties
	Bandeh (penalty scored); Henriksen (penalty scored); Kaba (penalty scored)		(penalty scored) Naustdal; (penalty scored) Rindal; (penalty scored) Bergum; (penalty scored) Skille

24 May 2023	Brumunddal (4)	1–4	(2) Raufoss	Brumunddal
18:00 CEST (UTC+2)	Frankmo 62'	Report	Brattbakk 22' (pen.); Frøysa 37'; Haruna 78'; Østerud 90+3'	Stadium: SH-banen; Attendance: 478; Referee: Hakan Catalgøl

24 May 2023	Lillehammer (5)	3–5	(2) Kongsvinger	Lillehammer
18:00 CEST (UTC+2)	Gjævenes 14'; Rahhaoui 26'; Renolen 38'	Report	Pedersen 5' (pen.), 49', 57'; Holtan 64', 86'	Stadium: Stampesletta; Referee: Haakon A. Pedersen Bue

24 May 2023	Nybergsund (5)	0–5	(1) HamKam	Nybergsund
18:00 CEST (UTC+2)		Report	Udahl 22', 23', 50'; Wiedesheim-Paul 35'; Sjølstad 44'	Stadium: Nybergsund Stadion; Attendance: 472; Referee: Johan William Grundt

24 May 2023	Elverum (4)	1–5	(3) Gjøvik-Lyn	Elverum
18:00 CEST (UTC+2)	Nelsinho 58'	Report	Gibson 9', 15'; Lekaj 17'; Tveten 40'; Opsahl 80'	Stadium: Elverum Stadion; Attendance: 252; Referee: Pål Riiser Berg

24 May 2023	Hønefoss (4)	1–4	(2) KFUM Oslo	Hønefoss
18:00 CEST (UTC+2)	El Amrani 67'	Report	Rasch 11' (pen.); Sa'Ad 18'; Hummelvoll-Nuñez 25'; P. N. Dahl 32'	Stadium: Aka Arena; Attendance: 613; Referee: Herman L. Aass

24 May 2023	Eik Tønsberg (4)	2–2 (a.e.t.) (4–3 p)	(1) Sandefjord	Tønsberg
18:00 CEST (UTC+2)	Rygel 69'; Nygaard 90+6'	Report	Nilsson 32', 48'	Stadium: Tønsberg Gressbane; Attendance: 1,523; Referee: Håvard Bjerkelund
	Penalties
	Midtgarden (penalty scored); Nygaard (penalty scored); Roberg (penalty scored); Myrbakk (penalty scored); Mathisen (penalty missed)		(penalty missed) Nilsson; (penalty scored) Dunsby; (penalty scored) Ayer; (penalty scored) Al-Saed; (penalty missed) Tveter

24 May 2023	Flint (5)	0–4	(3) Ørn Horten	Tønsberg
18:00 CEST (UTC+2)		Report	Rogulj 53', 59'; Kadriu 85'; Helling 90'	Stadium: Flint Esso Arena; Attendance: 150; Referee: Enes Erkök

24 May 2023	Pors (4)	0–2	(3) Notodden	Porsgrunn
18:00 CEST (UTC+2)		Report	Berntsen 2'; Husebø 87'	Stadium: Pors Stadion; Attendance: 400; Referee: Pavel Breivik

24 May 2023	Urædd (5)	1–7	(1) Odd	Porsgrunn
18:00 CEST (UTC+2)	Nordkvelle 78'	Report	Jevtović 13', 21', 31'; Wallem 50', 66'; Tomas 73'; Midtskogen 86'	Stadium: Urædd kunstgress Attendance: 700; Referee: Herman Holthe

24 May 2023	Fløy (3)	0–2	(2) Start	Flekkerøy
18:00 CEST (UTC+2)		Report	Ness 64'; Skogvold 87'	Stadium: Cemo Arena; Attendance: 1,200; Referee: Hussein Al-Kharasani

24 May 2023	Randesund (4)	0–8	(3) Arendal	Kristiansand
18:00 CEST (UTC+2)		Report	Skeie 22', 70', 90'; Håbestad 25'; Christensen 51', 53'; Johansen 76'; Lille-Løvø 89'	Stadium: Sukkevann idrettspark Referee: Zyad T. Qashua

24 May 2023	Mandalskameratene (4)	0–3	(2) Jerv	Mandal
18:00 CEST (UTC+2)		Report	Philibert 51'; Grønner 73' (pen.); Auklend 90'	Stadium: Idrettsparken; Attendance: 1,361; Referee: Karoline M. Jensen

24 May 2023	Forus og Gausel (5)	0–5	(1) Viking	Stavanger
18:00 CEST (UTC+2)		Report	Bjørshol 21', 45'; Austbø 52'; Diop 55'; Svendsen 73'	Stadium: XL-Bygg-banen; Attendance: 1,500; Referee: Aleksander S. Vermundsen

24 May 2023	Rosseland (5)	1–3	(2) Bryne	Bryne
18:00 CEST (UTC+2)	Hovland 57'	Report	Årsvoll 14'; Baldvinsson 64'; Dybevik 84'	Stadium: Rosseland kunstgress Referee: Javi Jean-Marc Mertens

24 May 2023	Vard Haugesund (3)	3–1	(3) Egersund	Haugesund
18:00 CEST (UTC+2)	Endresen 8'; Larsen 36' (o.g.); Jensen 48'	Report	Michalsen 58'	Stadium: Haugesund Stadion; Attendance: 273; Referee: Amir Ajjour

24 May 2023	Bjarg (4)	2–3	(4) Fana	Bergen
18:00 CEST (UTC+2)	Austevoll 10' (pen.); Njøs 51' (o.g.)	Report	Brekkhus 39'; Nilsen 83', 90'	Stadium: Stavollen Kunstgress; Referee: Markus Lille

24 May 2023	Frøya (4)	0–5	(1) Brann	Bergen
18:00 CEST (UTC+2)		Report	Myrlid 10', 60'; Hjorteseth 55', 72'; Finne 81'	Stadium: Varden Amfi; Attendance: 1,500; Referee: Sondre Brudvik

24 May 2023	Loddefjord (4)	2–3	(2) Åsane	Bergen
18:00 CEST (UTC+2)	Sivertsen 31'; Estifanos 71'	Report	Bolsø 39'; Bruun-Hanssen 57'; Myklebust 78'	Stadium: Alvøen kunstgress Referee: Freek Arjen van Herk

24 May 2023	Fjøra (5)	4–0	(4) Florø	Sogndal
18:00 CEST (UTC+2)	Olsen 28', 83'; Hovland 36' (pen.); Flo 48'	Report		Stadium: Fosshaugane Campus; Referee: Jakob S. Søgnen

24 May 2023	Eid (5)	0–4	(1) Aalesund	Nordfjordeid
18:00 CEST (UTC+2)		Report	Segberg 11'; Moses 34'; Atanga 39'; Holmøyvik 85' (o.g.)	Stadium: Eid Stadion; Attendance: 1,400; Referee: Jonas S. Mossestad

24 May 2023	Spjelkavik (4)	0–5	(2) Hødd	Ålesund
18:00 CEST (UTC+2)		Report	Brandal 3', 5', 42', 90+4'; Håheim-Elveseter 10'	Stadium: Spjelkavik Stadion; Attendance: 100; Referee: Daniel Refsnes

24 May 2023	Surnadal (5)	0–4	(1) Molde	Surnadal
18:00 CEST (UTC+2)		Report	Haugen 8'; Eriksen 35'; Ødegård 43'; Berisha 66'	Stadium: Syltøran Stadion; Attendance: 696; Referee: Bendik Haarberg

24 May 2023	Strindheim (4)	4–3 (a.e.t.)	(3) Træff	Trondheim
18:00 CEST (UTC+2)	Selnes 4'; Amundsen 59'; Strand 88'; Åsen 108'	Report	Bøe 30'; Eltervåg 42' (pen.); Hermansen 85'	Stadium: Leangen Bolig Arena; Attendance: 100; Referee: Oliver S. Barsøe

24 May 2023	Melhus (5)	2–0	(4) Kolstad	Melhus
18:00 CEST (UTC+2)	Trøen 18', 72'	Report		Stadium: Gruva Arena; Referee: Marit B. Folstad

24 May 2023	Orkla (4)	0–5	(3) Levanger	Orkanger
18:00 CEST (UTC+2)		Report	Olsen 9'; Asp 34', 51', 66' (pen.); Lorentsen 71'	Stadium: Orkla Sparebank Stadion; Attendance: 145; Referee: Mats T. Hansen

24 May 2023	Trygg/Lade (5)	0–1	(1) Rosenborg	Trondheim
18:00 CEST (UTC+2)		Report	Sadiku 17'	Stadium: Koteng Arena; Attendance: 863; Referee: Mathias Støfringshaug

24 May 2023	Junkeren (3)	5–0	(5) Innstranda	Bodø
18:00 CEST (UTC+2)	Kapskarmo 38', 83', 86'; Chooly 77'; Jakobsen 79'	Report		Stadium: Nordlandshallen; Attendance: 224; Referee: Even Andreas R. Eliassen

24 May 2023	Fløya (4)	2–3 (a.e.t.)	(3) Tromsdalen	Tromsø
18:00 CEST (UTC+2)	Schjetne 84'; Zala 90'	Report	Larsen 21', 32'; Eliassen 105'	Stadium: Floya Arena; Referee: Øyvind Jøstensen

24 May 2023	Herd (5)	1–2	(3) Brattvåg	Ålesund
18:15 CEST (UTC+2)	Tjøstheim 62'	Report	Refsnes 11'; Leine 41'	Stadium: AMFI Moa Stadion; Attendance: 150; Referee: Even Myrheim

24 May 2023	Åssiden (5)	0–4	(1) Stabæk	Drammen
18:30 CEST (UTC+2)		Report	Bakenga 11', 23'; Wendt 50'; Riise 66'	Stadium: Åssiden Stadion; Attendance: 274; Referee: Eivind Bodding

24 May 2023	Førde (4)	1–3	(2) Sogndal	Førde
18:30 CEST (UTC+2)	Savland 45+1'	Report	Díaz 42', 78' (pen.); Nessø 88'	Stadium: Førde Stadion; Referee: Sivert E. Orheim

24 May 2023	Asker (4)	0–2	(3) Bærum	Asker
19:00 CEST (UTC+2)		Report	Myrmo 53'; Bransdal 88'	Stadium: Føyka kunstgress Attendance: 345; Referee: Marit Skurdal

24 May 2023	Tomrefjord (5)	0–2	(2) Kristiansund	Tomrefjord
19:00 CEST (UTC+2)		Report	Weidel 50'; Alvheim 80'	Stadium: Tomrefjord Stadion; Attendance: 140; Referee: Mathias S. Kringstad

24 May 2023	Halsen (4)	2–0	(3) Fram	Larvik
19:00 CEST (UTC+2)	Smith 27'; Solli 75'	Report		Stadium: Bergeskogen kunstgress Attendance: 550; Referee: Lars B. Jacobsen

24 May 2023	Frigg (4)	4–1	(3) Ullern	Oslo
19:00 CEST (UTC+2)	Nomell 53'; Sawaneh 72'; Antonsen-Meløy 78'; Krohg 90'	Report	Tobiassen 90'	Stadium: Tørteberg kunstgress Referee: Morten Andersen-Gott

24 May 2023	Lokomotiv Oslo (4)	5–5 (a.e.t.) (3–4 p)	(3) Ull/Kisa	Oslo
19:00 CEST (UTC+2)	Kytiri 34'; Dahlen 77', 103'; Bjørdal 97' (pen.); Storseth 115'	Report	Kristoffersen 12'; Sørløkk 84', 116'; Kvernstuen 113'; Nilsen-Modebe 120+2'	Stadium: Frogner kunstgress Attendance: 74; Referee: Jonas Johnsen

24 May 2023	Stord (4)	3–1	(4) Sandviken	Stord
19:00 CEST (UTC+2)	Skard 6'; Eide 25'; Tungeland 44'	Report	Hauge 58'	Stadium: Stord Stadion; Attendance: 300; Referee: Anders B. Hansen

24 May 2023	Skedsmo (4)	0–4	(1) Lillestrøm	Skedsmokorset
19:35 CEST (UTC+2)		Report	Svendsen 61', 77', 78'; Slørdahl 84'	Stadium: Skedsmo Stadion; Attendance: 1,500; Referee: Ali Al Hatam

24 May 2023	Verdal (4)	1–4	(2) Ranheim	Verdalsøra
20:00 CEST (UTC+2)	Hansen 55'	Report	Pedersen 4'; Gunnes 28', 80'; Langås 59'	Stadium: Verdalskalk Arena; Attendance: 200; Referee: Robert Eggen

25 May 2023	Råde (5)	0–1	(1) Vålerenga	Råde
18:00 CEST (UTC+2)		Report	Eng 19'	Stadium: Råde idrettspark Attendance: 1,723; Referee: Jørgen Haugen

25 May 2023	Fu/Vo (4)	1–3	(1) Sarpsborg 08	Oppåkermoen
18:00 CEST (UTC+2)	Karlsen 6'	Report	Skålevik 28'; Soltvedt 42'; Opseth 58' (pen.)	Stadium: Funnefoss Stadion; Attendance: 300; Referee: Stian R. Sletner

25 May 2023	Fyllingsdalen (4)	1–3	(3) Sotra	Bergen
18:00 CEST (UTC+2)	Antonsen 51'	Report	Foldnes 28'; Berge 74'; Mvuka 78' (pen.)	Stadium: Varden Amfi; Referee: Mattias G. Sakstad

25 May 2023	Drammen (5)	1–5	(2) Mjøndalen	Drammen
18:00 CEST (UTC+2)	Haugland 46'	Report	Hansen 11', 41'; Lien 21'; Ovenstad 24' (pen.); Singh 38'	Stadium: Ørenbanen; Referee: Jørgen Haga

25 May 2023	Staal Jørpeland (4)	1–2	(1) Haugesund	Jørpeland
18:00 CEST (UTC+2)	Ciach 87'	Report	Pajaziti 10', 28'	Stadium: Jørpeland Stadion; Attendance: 700; Referee: Ola Kellerhals

25 May 2023	Brodd (4)	1–2	(4) Vidar	Stavanger
18:00 CEST (UTC+2)	Ali Abdi 56'	Report	Jørgensen 71'; Emanuelsen 82'	Stadium: Midjord idrettspark Referee: Einar R. Løyning

25 May 2023	Djerv 1919 (4)	1–6	(2) Sandnes Ulf	Haugesund
18:00 CEST (UTC+2)	Pedersen 78'	Report	Ramsland 27', 69'; Salvesen 36'; Memedov 45'; Høiland 81'; Jensen 89'	Stadium: Djervbanen; Referee: Mischa H. Kellerhals

25 May 2023	Nardo (4)	0–1	(4) Byåsen	Trondheim
18:00 CEST (UTC+2)		Report	Romsdalen 68'	Stadium: Nissekollen kunstgress Attendance: 185; Referee: Per Oscar G. Heiberg

25 May 2023	Mosjøen (4)	0–3	(1) Bodø/Glimt	Mosjøen
19:00 CEST (UTC+2)		Report	Žugelj 41', 74'; Grønbæk 43'	Stadium: Kippermoen Idrettspark; Referee: Anders Bodding

25 May 2023	Mjølner (4)	5–3	(5) Harstad	Narvik
19:00 CEST (UTC+2)	Helan 14', 82'; Kalinins 57' (pen.); Hanssen 71'; Torblå 74'	Report	Windstad 25', 54'; Evensen 32'	Stadium: Narvik kunstgress Attendance: 150; Referee: Torjus Johansen Kaspersen

== Second round ==
The pair-ups for the second round were announced on 25 May 2023.

Number of teams per tier entering this round
Eliteserien (1)	1. divisjon (2)	2. divisjon (3)	3. divisjon (4)	4. divisjon (5)	Total
15 / 16	16 / 16	19 / 28	12 / 84	2 / 272	64 / 416

1 June 2023	Sotra (3)	2–1	(2) Sandnes Ulf	Sotra
17:00 CEST (UTC+2)	Foldnes 13'; Falck 27'	Report	Memedov 67'	Stadium: Straume Idrettspark; Attendance: 187; Referee: Steinar Hauge

1 June 2023	Skjervøy (4)	2–3	(3) Alta	Skjervøy
18:00 CEST (UTC+2)	Skallebø 6'; Kaspersen 14'	Report	Suhr-Stamnes 30'; Reginiussen 31'; Brekke 41'	Stadium: Lerøy Stadion; Attendance: 150; Referee: Egil Bertheussen

1 June 2023	Tromsdalen (3)	1–1 (a.e.t.) (1–4 p)	(1) Tromsø	Tromsø
18:00 CEST (UTC+2)	Larsen 61'	Report	A. Jenssen 90+4'	Stadium: Romssa Arena; Attendance: 1,122; Referee: Kristian Kristiansen
	Penalties
	S. Pedersen (penalty missed); Vådebu (penalty scored); Ness (penalty missed)		(penalty scored) Erlien; (penalty scored) Vesterlund; (penalty scored) Antonsen; (penalty scored) Diouf

1 June 2023	Mjølner (4)	0–8	(1) HamKam	Narvik
18:00 CEST (UTC+2)		Report	Faraas 23', 52', 63', 82'; Enkerud 54', 90'; Wiedesheim-Paul 77', 89'	Stadium: Narvik kunstgress Attendance: 450; Referee: Stian R. Sletner

1 June 2023	Junkeren (3)	1–2	(1) Bodø/Glimt	Bodø
18:00 CEST (UTC+2)	Lien 56'	Report	Amundsen 42'; Pemi 87'	Stadium: Nordlandshallen; Attendance: 2,006; Referee: Martin Berg

1 June 2023	Melhus (5)	0–6	(1) Molde	Melhus
18:00 CEST (UTC+2)		Report	Ødegård 49'; Grødem 59', 71', 81', 90'; Breivik 88'	Stadium: Gruva Arena; Referee: Mathias Støfringshaug

1 June 2023	Byåsen (4)	1–6	(1) Aalesund	Trondheim
18:00 CEST (UTC+2)	Murray 38' (o.g.)	Report	Karlsbakk 12', 35' (pen.); Kristensen 45'; Ødemarksbakken 62'; Barmen 75', 80'	Stadium: Byåsen Arena; Attendance: 286; Referee: Bendik Haarberg

1 June 2023	Strindheim (4)	1–3	(2) Ranheim	Trondheim
18:00 CEST (UTC+2)	Selnes 67'	Report	Alte 26'; Tromsdal 78'; M.G. Pedersen 85'	Stadium: Leangen Bolig Arena; Referee: Haakon A. Pedersen Bue

1 June 2023	Stjørdals-Blink (3)	2–1	(1) Rosenborg	Stjørdalshalsen
18:00 CEST (UTC+2)	Fossli 59'; Hermanstad 69'	Report	Aga 89' (pen.)	Stadium: M.U.S Stadion Sandskogan; Attendance: 1,321; Referee: Mathias S. Kringstad

1 June 2023	Levanger (3)	0–2	(2) Kristiansund	Levanger
18:00 CEST (UTC+2)		Report	Williamsen 32'; Kartum 47'	Stadium: TOBB Arena; Attendance: 320; Referee: Johan W. Grundt

1 June 2023	Brattvåg (3)	1–0	(2) Hødd	Brattvåg
18:00 CEST (UTC+2)	Beite 2'	Report		Stadium: Brattvåg gras Referee: Oliver S. Barsøe

1 June 2023	Fjøra (5)	1–8	(1) Brann	Sogndal
18:00 CEST (UTC+2)	Flo 53'	Report	Crone 9'; Hjorteseth 10'; Knudsen 29'; Castro 32'; Torsvik 56'; Finne 73', 80'; Holten 89'	Stadium: Fosshaugane Campus; Attendance: 1,294; Referee: Jonas S. Mossestad

1 June 2023	Lysekloster (4)	1–2 (a.e.t.)	(2) Sogndal	Lysekloster
18:00 CEST (UTC+2)	H. Andersen 6'	Report	Nessø 2'; Jónsson 110'	Stadium: Lysekloster Family Arena; Attendance: 345; Referee: Ola Kellerhals

1 June 2023	Fana (4)	0–1	(2) Åsane	Bergen
18:00 CEST (UTC+2)		Report	Myklebust 24'	Stadium: Nesttun Kunstgress; Attendance: 515; Referee: Aleksander S. Vermundsen

1 June 2023	Stord (4)	1–3	(1) Haugesund	Stord
18:00 CEST (UTC+2)	Handeland 44'	Report	Njie 51', 67', 83'	Stadium: Stord Stadion; Attendance: 989; Referee: Sondre Brudvik

1 June 2023	Vidar (4)	0–2	(1) Viking	Stavanger
18:00 CEST (UTC+2)		Report	Bjarnason 61', 71'	Stadium: Lassa Idrettspark; Attendance: 1,500; Referee: Javi Jean-Marc Mertens

1 June 2023	Vard Haugesund (3)	3–1	(2) Bryne	Haugesund
18:00 CEST (UTC+2)	Kvarven 26'; Kuittinen 86'; Ndayisenga 90+5'	Report	Mneney 37'	Stadium: Haugesund Stadion; Attendance: 262; Referee: Freek Arjen van Herk

1 June 2023	Arendal (3)	0–1	(2) Jerv	Arendal
18:00 CEST (UTC+2)		Report	Cijntje 42'	Stadium: Norac stadion Attendance: 1,754; Referee: Jørgen Haga

1 June 2023	Notodden (3)	2–5	(1) Odd	Notodden
18:00 CEST (UTC+2)	Frithzell 4'; Gampedalen 90+1'	Report	Jevtović 11'; Owusu 65'; Midtskogen 74'; Glenna 87'; Tewelde 90+5'	Stadium: Idrettsparken; Attendance: 822; Referee: Eirik Wisted-Thu

1 June 2023	Halsen (4)	0–3	(2) Start	Larvik
18:00 CEST (UTC+2)		Report	Sanyang 32'; Nilsen 61'; E. G. Pedersen 67'	Stadium: Bergeskogen kunstgress Attendance: 150; Referee: Herman L. Aass

1 June 2023	Ørn Horten (3)	0–1	(2) Fredrikstad	Horten
18:00 CEST (UTC+2)		Report	Bjartalíð 90+2'	Stadium: Lystlunden; Attendance: 562; Referee: Herman Holthe

1 June 2023	Gjøvik-Lyn (3)	3–3 (a.e.t.) (4–1 p)	(2) Kongsvinger	Gjøvik
18:00 CEST (UTC+2)	Gibson 64'; Lekaj 74'; Kraska 108'	Report	Grundt 22', 120+3'; Güven 53'	Stadium: Gjøvik Stadion; Referee: Anders Bodding
	Penalties
	Nelson (penalty scored); Gibson (penalty scored); Kraska (penalty scored); Olsen (penalty scored)		(penalty missed) Güven; (penalty missed) Holtan; (penalty scored) Holter

1 June 2023	Gjelleråsen (4)	1–2	(2) KFUM Oslo	Nittedal
18:00 CEST (UTC+2)	Khris 61'	Report	Hoseth 65'; Hestnes 74'	Stadium: Li kunstgress Referee: Mohammad Hafezi

1 June 2023	Ull/Kisa (3)	3–2 (a.e.t.)	(1) Lillestrøm	Jessheim
18:00 CEST (UTC+2)	Hammershaug 10'; Sundgot 34'; Nyhagen 94'	Report	Adams 74', 92'	Stadium: Jessheim Stadion; Attendance: 1,576; Referee: Magnus N. Koløy

1 June 2023	Strømmen (3)	1–3	(2) Mjøndalen	Strømmen
18:00 CEST (UTC+2)	Seferi 23'	Report	Lien 13', 65'; Skistad 87'	Stadium: Strømmen Stadion; Attendance: 267; Referee: Satha Sejoohn Sritharan

1 June 2023	Frigg (4)	3–5 (a.e.t.)	(1) Sarpsborg 08	Oslo
18:00 CEST (UTC+2)	Krohg 11'; Nomell 32'; Antonsen-Meløy 40'	Report	M. H. Andersen 21', 43'; Opseth 46'; Tibbling 112', 115'	Stadium: Tørteberg kunstgress Attendance: 396; Referee: Jørgen Haugen

1 June 2023	Bærum (3)	3–0	(2) Skeid	Sandvika
18:00 CEST (UTC+2)	Vogt 13'; Bransdal 50'; Løvseth 62'	Report		Stadium: AJ Arena; Attendance: 163; Referee: Magnus H. Tjelle

1 June 2023	Grorud (3)	1–2	(2) Raufoss	Oslo
18:00 CEST (UTC+2)	Hristov 88'	Report	Teigen 23'; Brattbakk 90+4'	Stadium: Grorud matchbane Attendance: 340; Referee: Abdulhadi Al-Fahad

1 June 2023	Kjelsås (3)	3–1	(1) Stabæk	Oslo
18:00 CEST (UTC+2)	Walstad 16' (o.g.); Aslaksrud 21'; Willumsen 31'	Report	N. P. Jenssen 48'	Stadium: Grefsen Stadion; Attendance: 712; Referee: Ole-Alexander E. Valen

1 June 2023	Kvik Halden (3)	0–2	(2) Moss	Halden
19:00 CEST (UTC+2)		Report	S. Pedersen 34'; Callaku 80'	Stadium: Halden Stadion; Attendance: 472; Referee: Hakan Catalgøl

1 June 2023	Lyn (3)	1–2	(1) Vålerenga	Oslo
19:00 CEST (UTC+2)	Skaug 48'	Report	Laajab 28' (o.g.); Ofkir 86'	Stadium: Bislett Stadium; Attendance: 7,777; Referee: Harald V. Sletner

1 June 2023	Eik Tønsberg (4)	1–2	(1) Strømsgodset	Tønsberg
20:00 CEST (UTC+2)	Nygaard 37'	Report	Brunes 9', 69'	Stadium: Tønsberg Gressbane; Attendance: 2,670; Referee: Eivind Bodding

== Third round ==
The draw for the third round was made on 1 June 2023.

Number of teams per tier entering this round
Eliteserien (1)	1. divisjon (2)	2. divisjon (3)	3. divisjon (4)	4. divisjon (5)	Total
12 / 16	11 / 16	9 / 28	0 / 84	0 / 272	32 / 416

7 June 2023	KFUM Oslo (2)	4–2 (a.e.t.)	(2) Åsane	Oslo
17:00 CEST (UTC+2)	Sandal 31', 49'; Hummelvoll-Nuñez 98' (pen.); Sa'Ad 105'	Report	Lotsberg 79'; Myklebust 85'	Stadium: KFUM Arena; Attendance: 721; Referee: Eivind Bodding

7 June 2023	Aalesund (1)	3–3 (a.e.t.) (5–6 p)	(1) Brann	Ålesund
18:00 CEST (UTC+2)	Atanga 25'; Karlsbakk 43' (pen.), 97'	Report; Penalties	Crone 37'; T. B. Pedersen 88'; Blomberg 101'	Stadium: Color Line Stadion; Attendance: 1,400; Referee: Mohammad U. Aslam
	Penalties
	Segberg (penalty scored); Karlsbakk (penalty missed); Lunding (penalty scored); Hopland (penalty scored); Juel (penalty missed); Ødemarksbakken (penalty scored); Kolskogen (penalty scored); Diop (penalty missed)		(penalty scored) Finne; (penalty missed) Blomberg; (penalty scored) Myhre; (penalty scored) Myrlid; (penalty missed) Rasmussen; (penalty scored) Kristiansen; (penalty scored) Wolfe; (penalty scored) Hjorteseth

7 June 2023	Brattvåg (3)	2–1	(1) Haugesund	Brattvåg
18:00 CEST (UTC+2)	Sissoko 74', 80'	Report	Diarra 41' (pen.)	Stadium: Brattvåg gras Attendance: 362; Referee: Marius H. Grøtta

7 June 2023	Sarpsborg 08 (1)	3–1	(1) Odd	Sarpsborg
18:00 CEST (UTC+2)	Opseth 42'; Jakobsen 45+1'; Overgaard 79'	Report	Midtskogen 78'	Stadium: Sarpsborg Stadion; Attendance: 1,867; Referee: Ola Hobber Nilsen

7 June 2023	Stjørdals-Blink (3)	3–2 (a.e.t.)	(3) Ull/Kisa	Stjørdalshalsen
18:00 CEST (UTC+2)	Fossli 45+1'; Haukeberg 90+3'; Hammerås 104'	Report	Sandberg 52' (o.g.); Sundgot 66'	Stadium: M.U.S Stadion Sandskogan; Attendance: 388; Referee: Mathias Støfringshaug

7 June 2023	Ranheim (2)	0–2	(1) Bodø/Glimt	Trondheim
18:00 CEST (UTC+2)		Report	Berg 34'; Grønbæk 49'	Stadium: EXTRA Arena; Attendance: 1,858; Referee: Daniel Higraff

7 June 2023	Vard Haugesund (3)	1–4	(1) Strømsgodset	Haugesund
18:00 CEST (UTC+2)	Jensen 10'	Report	Mehnert 7'; Gulliksen 52'; Brunes 83', 90'	Stadium: Haugesund Stadion; Attendance: 625; Referee: Steinar Hauge

7 June 2023	Alta (3)	0–1	(1) Tromsø	Alta
18:00 CEST (UTC+2)		Report	Bassi 29'	Stadium: SmartDok Arena; Attendance: 781; Referee: Magnus N. Koløy

7 June 2023	Sogndal (2)	2–0	(2) Moss	Sogndal
18:00 CEST (UTC+2)	Skaanes 55'; Nord 90'	Report		Stadium: Fosshaugane Campus; Attendance: 964; Referee: Kristoffer Hagenes

7 June 2023	Kjelsås (3)	2–1	(2) Jerv	Oslo
18:00 CEST (UTC+2)	Aslaksrud 9', 90+8'	Report	Ugland 30'	Stadium: Grefsen Stadion; Attendance: 788; Referee: Mischa H. Kellerhals

7 June 2023	Gjøvik-Lyn (3)	1–0	(2) Start	Gjøvik
18:00 CEST (UTC+2)	Kraska 75'	Report		Stadium: Gjøvik Stadion; Attendance: 940; Referee: Ajdin Medic

7 June 2023	Mjøndalen (2)	0–4	(2) Raufoss	Mjøndalen
18:00 CEST (UTC+2)		Report	Brattbakk 2'; Mettler 40'; Fagernes 54'; Sveen 81' (o.g.)	Stadium: Consto Arena; Attendance: 366; Referee: Harald V. Sletner

7 June 2023	Bærum (3)	1–3 (a.e.t.)	(1) HamKam	Sandvika
19:00 CEST (UTC+2)	Dacic 65'	Report	Kirkevold 82'; Enkerud 92'; Gammelby 120'	Stadium: AJ Arena; Attendance: 479; Referee: Marius Lien

7 June 2023	Kristiansund (2)	0–1	(1) Molde	Kristiansund
19:00 CEST (UTC+2)		Report	Eriksen 66'	Stadium: Kristiansund Stadion; Attendance: 3,407; Referee: Jan Morten Tennøy

7 June 2023	Sotra (3)	0–2	(1) Vålerenga	Sotra
19:00 CEST (UTC+2)		Report	Børven 17'; Ofkir 21'	Stadium: Straume Idrettspark; Attendance: 800; Referee: Svein Oddvar Moen

7 June 2023	Fredrikstad (2)	1–2	(1) Viking	Fredrikstad
20:00 CEST (UTC+2)	Alba 15'	Report	Bjarnason 37'; Tripić 90+4' (pen.)	Stadium: Fredrikstad Stadion; Attendance: 2,860; Referee: Rohit Saggi

== Fourth round ==
The draw for the fourth round was made on 7 June 2023.

Number of teams per tier entering this round
Eliteserien (1)	1. divisjon (2)	2. divisjon (3)	3. divisjon (4)	4. divisjon (5)	Total
9 / 16	3 / 16	4 / 28	0 / 84	0 / 272	16 / 416

28 June 2023	Kjelsås (3)	2–0	(2) KFUM Oslo	Oslo
18:00 CEST (UTC+2)	Aslaksrud 90+2'; Vinge 90+5'	Report		Stadium: Grefsen Stadion; Attendance: 1,303; Referee: Ola Hobber Nilsen

28 June 2023	Stjørdals-Blink (3)	0–5	(1) Vålerenga	Stjørdalshalsen
18:00 CEST (UTC+2)		Report	Kjelsen 6'; Jensen 45'; Riisnæs 67'; Børven 76'; Bjørdal 86'	Stadium: M.U.S Stadion Sandskogan; Attendance: 1,603; Referee: Marius H. Grøtta

28 June 2023	Raufoss (2)	4–4 (a.e.t.) (4–1 p)	(1) Viking	Raufoss
18:00 CEST (UTC+2)	Mettler 42' (pen.); Brattbakk 73'; Helmersen 86'; Somesi 110'	Report; Penalties	D'Agostino 12' (pen.); Svendsen 55'; Sandberg 77', 102'	Stadium: Nammo Stadion; Attendance: 1,578; Referee: Sivert Ø. Amland
	Penalties
	Mettler (penalty scored); Brattbakk (penalty scored); Simenstad (penalty scored); Racaj (penalty scored)		(penalty missed) Sandberg; (penalty missed) Svendsen; (penalty scored) Vevatne

28 June 2023	Sogndal (2)	3–4	(1) Sarpsborg 08	Sogndal
18:00 CEST (UTC+2)	Jónsson 32'; Twum 42'; Flo 66'	Report	Opseth 10', 73', 82'; Flo 89' (o.g.)	Stadium: Fosshaugane Campus; Referee: Mohammad U. Aslam

28 June 2023	Molde (1)	3–0	(1) Strømsgodset	Molde
18:00 CEST (UTC+2)	Brynhildsen 1'; Kitolano 5'; Breivik 26' (pen.)	Report		Stadium: Aker Stadion; Attendance: 2,594; Referee: Svein Oddvar Moen

28 June 2023	Brattvåg (3)	1–7	(1) Brann	Brattvåg
18:00 CEST (UTC+2)	Tattum 29'	Report	Nilsen 10'; Finne 14', 38', 53', 55'; Myhre 34'; Hagen 68'	Stadium: Brattvåg gras Attendance: 1,445; Referee: Svein T. Sinnes

28 June 2023	Gjøvik-Lyn (3)	0–5	(1) HamKam	Gjøvik
18:00 CEST (UTC+2)		Report	Wiedesheim-Paul 35', 72'; Bjarnason 44'; Kjærgaard 47'; Enkerud 76'	Stadium: Gjøvik Stadion; Attendance: 1,962; Referee: Daniel Higraff

28 June 2023	Bodø/Glimt (1)	3–2	(1) Tromsø	Bodø
19:05 CEST (UTC+2)	Žugelj 77'; Bjørtuft 90+4'; Saltnes 90+6'	Report	Hjertø-Dahl 20'; Erlien 69'	Stadium: Aspmyra Stadion; Attendance: 6,377; Referee: Rohit Saggi

== Quarter-finals ==
The draw for the quarter-finals was made on 28 June 2023.

Number of teams per tier entering this round
Eliteserien (1)	1. divisjon (2)	2. divisjon (3)	3. divisjon (4)	4. divisjon (5)	Total
6 / 16	1 / 16	1 / 28	0 / 84	0 / 272	8 / 416

12 July 2023	Molde (1)	3–1	(1) Sarpsborg 08	Molde
18:00 CEST (UTC+2)	Kitolano 1'; Breivik 5'; Brynhildsen 35'	Report	Lundqvist 73'	Stadium: Aker Stadion; Attendance: 3,752; Referee: Ola Hobber Nilsen

12 July 2023	Vålerenga (1)	3–2	(1) Brann	Oslo
20:00 CEST (UTC+2)	Jatta 13'; Ofkir 60', 66'	Report	Larsen 5'; Finne 6'	Stadium: Intility Arena; Attendance: 7,833; Referee: Svein Oddvar Moen

13 July 2023	HamKam (1)	0–2	(1) Bodø/Glimt	Hamar
18:00 CEST (UTC+2)		Report	Grønbæk 55'; Berg 76'	Stadium: Briskeby Stadion; Attendance: 3,861; Referee: Tore Hansen

13 July 2023	Kjelsås (3)	2–1	(2) Raufoss	Oslo
18:00 CEST (UTC+2)	Vinge 60'; Aslaksrud 90+6' (pen.)	Report	Fremstad 87'	Stadium: Grefsen Stadion; Attendance: 2,113; Referee: Sigurd S. Kringstad

== Semi-finals ==
The draw for the semi-finals was made on 28 June 2023.

Number of teams per tier entering this round
Eliteserien (1)	1. divisjon (2)	2. divisjon (3)	3. divisjon (4)	4. divisjon (5)	Total
3 / 16	0 / 16	1 / 28	0 / 84	0 / 272	4 / 416

27 September 2023	Kjelsås (3)	0–1	(1) Molde	Oslo
16:00 CEST (UTC+2)		Report	Grødem 5'	Stadium: Grefsen Stadion; Attendance: 3,317; Referee: Rohit Saggi

28 September 2023	Vålerenga (1)	2–4	(1) Bodø/Glimt	Oslo
19:00 CEST (UTC+2)	Ilić 15', 59'	Report	Saltnes 3'; Pemi 56', 86'; Sørensen 90+5'	Stadium: Intility Arena; Attendance: 10,863; Referee: Tore Hansen

== Final ==
The final was played on 9 December 2023.

9 December 2023
16:00 CET (UTC+1)

Bodø/Glimt	0–1	Molde
	Report	Gulbrandsen 89'

Ullevaal Stadion, Oslo
Attendance: 19,178
Referee: Kristoffer Hagenes (Hovding)

== Top scorers ==
As of 27 September 2023

Rank	Player	Club	Goals
1	(Norway) Bård Finne	Brann	8
2	(Norway) Kristian Opseth	Sarpsborg	6
3	(Norway) Filip Brattbakk	Raufoss	5
3	(Norway) Magnus Grødem	Molde	5
3	(Sweden) Rasmus Wiedesheim-Paul	HamKam	5
3	(Norway) Jens Bonde Aslaksrud	Kjelsås	5
3	(Norway) Jonatan Braut Brunes	Strømsgodset	5
