= Aleksander Andresen =

Norwegian footballer (born 2005)

Personal information
- Full name: Aleksander Andresen
- Date of birth: 6 April 2005 (age 21)
- Position: Wingback

Team information
- Current team: HamKam
- Number: 5

Youth career
- –2020: Moss

Senior career*
Years	Team	Apps	(Gls)
2021–2025	Stabæk	77	(3)
2021	→ Moss (loan)	8	(1)
2026	Fredrikstad	3	(0)
2026–	HamKam	0	(0)

International career^{‡}
2021	Norway U16	8	(1)
2021	Norway U17	6	(0)
2023	Norway U18	9	(1)
2023–	Norway U19	12	(0)
- * Club domestic league appearances and goals as of 23 July 2026 ‡ National team caps and goals as of 29 August 2024

Aleksander Andresen (born 6 April 2005) is a Norwegian footballer who plays as a wingback for HamKam.

== Career statistics ==
As of 20 February 2024

Club	Season	League			Cup		Total	
Club	Season	Division	Apps	Goals	Apps	Goals	Apps	Goals
Stabæk	2021	Eliteserien	1	0	0	0	1	0
Stabæk	2022	1. divisjon	9	0	2	0	11	0
Stabæk	2023	Eliteserien	17	0	4	1	21	1
Stabæk	2024	1. divisjon	0	0	0	0	0	0
Stabæk	Total		27	0	6	1	33	1
Moss (loan)	2021	2. divisjon	8	1	2	0	10	1
Career total			35	1	8	1	43	2
