= Rasmus Eggen Vinge =

Norwegian footballer (born 2001)

Personal information
- Date of birth: 28 January 2001 (age 25)
- Position: Winger

Team information
- Current team: KFUM
- Number: 18

Youth career
- –2014: Oppsal
- 2015–2020: Nordstrand

Senior career*
Years	Team	Apps	(Gls)
2019–2021	Nordstrand	14	(4)
2022–2023	Kjelsås	35	(7)
2023–2025	Stabæk	67	(10)
2026–	KFUM	12	(3)
- * Club domestic league appearances and goals as of 26 July 2026

Rasmus Eggen Vinge (born 28 January 2001) is a Norwegian footballer who plays as a winger for KFUM.

== Career ==
Vinge played youth football for Oppsal IF. In 2015 he moved on to Nordstrand, where he made his 3. divisjon debut in 2019. As the 2020 season was cancelled altogether, he did not become a regular until 2021, and then went on to Kjelsås in the 2. divisjon.

Vinge made a breakthrough at Kjelsås during the 2023 Norwegian Football Cup, where he scored against Stabæk to eliminate the first-tier team. He scored again in the round of 16 where Kjelsås knocked out second-tier team KFUM. In the quarter-final Vinge scored the first goal in a 2–1 victory over Raufoss, securing an unprecedented cup semi-final. Vinge would not play that semi-final, as he joined Stabæk on the starting day of the transfer window, 1 August 2023.

Vinge made his Eliteserien debut in August against Viking, and scored his first goal in October against Sarpsborg 08. A few months after joining Stabæk, Vinge was included in CIES Football Observatory's list over most successful dribbles per game in the European top leagues, where Vinge had a score of 6.4. TV 2 pundit Simen Stamsø Møller stated that Vinge handled the new league "surprisingly well".

== Personal life ==
Before he became professional with Stabæk, Vinge studied physiotherapy for three years.
