= Gustav Sving Helling =

Norwegian footballer (born 2001)

Personal information
- Date of birth: 16 August 2001 (age 25)
- Position: Forward

Team information
- Current team: Ørn-Horten
- Number: 16

Youth career
- –2017: Sande
- 2017–2019: Mjøndalen

Senior career*
Years	Team	Apps	(Gls)
2017	Sande		
2020–2021	Mjøndalen	3	(0)
2021–	Ørn-Horten	22	(12)
- * Club domestic league appearances and goals as of 11 June 2022

Gustav Sving Helling (born 16 August 2001) is a Norwegian football striker who currently plays for Ørn Horten.

He started his youth career in Sande SK, making his senior debut on the seventh tier in 2017 before joining Mjøndalen's youth ranks in the summer of that year. He was promoted to the senior squad in 2020 and made his Eliteserien debut in August 2020 against Brann. In July 2021 he made his debut for FK Ørn-Horten in the 2021 Norwegian Football Cup.
