= Omar Bully Drammeh =

Norwegian football player (born 2002)

Personal information
- Full name: Omar Bully Drammeh
- Date of birth: 21 November 2002 (age 23)
- Place of birth: Oslo, Norway
- Height: 1.77 m (5 ft 10 in)
- Position: Midfielder

Team information
- Current team: Vålerenga
- Number: 31

Youth career
- 2014–2017: Romsås
- 2017: Vålerenga
- 2018: Lillestrøm

Senior career*
Years	Team	Apps	(Gls)
2019–2022	Grorud	29	(3)
2023–	Vålerenga 2	21	(0)
2023–	Vålerenga	2	(0)
- * Club domestic league appearances and goals as of 1 December 2025

Omar Bully Drammeh (born 21 November 2002) is a Norwegian professional footballer who plays as midfielder for the Norwegian club Vålerenga.

== Career ==
Drammeh started playing football for local side Romsås at the age of twelve. Later he would continue his youth career at Vålerenga Fotball, however he later left the club due to reported "lack of seriousness". He then went to play for rival club Lillestrøm, but also this spell was short-lived due to similar reasons.

In 2019, he returned to Oslo to play for Grorud. Despite getting his league debut for the club on the 20 July, he mainly spent the first season with the reserve team. In the following seasons he established himself as a first team player, but due to several injuries he was never able to play a full season.

On 16 November 2022, Drammeh returned to his childhood club Vålerenga, signing a four-year contract. He got his first team debut on 24 September 2023, playing the last 13 minutes in a 4–2 loss against Bodø-Glimt.
