= Fillip Jenssen Riise =

Norwegian footballer (born 2007)

Personal information
- Date of birth: 11 May 2007 (age 19)
- Position: Defender

Team information
- Current team: Stabæk
- Number: 2

Youth career
- –2019: Rollon
- 2019–2022: Stabæk

Senior career*
| Years | Team | Apps | (Gls) |
| 2022–2024 | Stabæk 2 | 15 | (0) |
| 2023– | Stabæk | 47 | (2) |

International career^{‡}
| 2022 | Norway U15 | 2 | (0) |
- * Club domestic league appearances and goals as of 14 November 2026 ‡ National team caps and goals as of 21 March 2023

Fillip Jenssen Riise (born 11 May 2007) is a Norwegian footballer who plays as a defender for Norwegian side Stabæk.

== Club career ==
Having started his career at Rollon, Riise joined the academy of Stabæk mid-way through the 2019 season. He made his debut for Stabæk's second team in the Norwegian Third Division on 23 October 2022, coming on as a substitute in a 10–1 win over Ready.

The following season, he was involved with the Stabæk first team, making his unofficial debut in a friendly match against Jerv. He made his debut for the Stabæk first team in a 5–0 Norwegian Cup win over Bryne on 12 March 2023, coming on as a second-half substitute for Mushaga Bakenga. In his second game for the club, he scored a penalty in a 9–8 penalty shoot-out win against Molde, also in the Norwegian Cup, and was praised for his performance.

== International career ==
Riise has represented Norway at under-15 level. He played two matches in 2022.

== Personal life ==
He is the son of Bjørn Helge Riise, and the nephew of John Arne Riise, both of whom represented Norway at international level.

== Career statistics ==
=== Club ===
As of 21 March 2023.

Appearances and goals by club, season and competition
| Club | Season | League | | | Cup | | Continental | | Other | | Total | |
| Club | Season | Division | Apps | Goals | Apps | Goals | Apps | Goals | Apps | Goals | Apps | Goals |
|---|---|---|---|---|---|---|---|---|---|---|---|---|
| Stabæk 2 | 2022 | 3. divisjon | 1 | 0 | – | | – | | 0 | 0 | 1 | 0 |
| Stabæk | 2023 | Eliteserien | 0 | 0 | 2 (Note: Appearances in the Norwegian Cup) | 0 | – | | 0 | 0 | 2 | 0 |
| Career total | | | 1 | 0 | 2 | 0 | 0 | 0 | 0 | 0 | 3 | 0 |
