= Nikolas Walstad =

Norwegian footballer (born 1997)

Personal information
- Date of birth: 14 February 1997 (age 29)
- Height: 1.76 m (5 ft 9 in)
- Position: Defender

Team information
- Current team: Odd
- Number: 4

Youth career
- –2011: Rælingen
- 2012–2016: Lillestrøm

Senior career*
Years	Team	Apps	(Gls)
2017–2020	Ull/Kisa	86	(2)
2021–2022	Mjøndalen	28	(2)
2022–2025	Haugesund	27	(1)
2023–2024	→ Stabæk (loan)	46	(2)
2025–	Odd	23	(0)

International career^{‡}
2012	Norway U15	4	(0)
2013	Norway U16	6	(0)
2017	Norway U17	1	(0)
2017	Norway U18	5	(0)
- * Club domestic league appearances and goals as of 1 December 2025 ‡ National team caps and goals as of 9 May 2021

Nikolas Walstad (born 14 February 1997) is a Norwegian professional footballer who plays as a left back for Odd.

== Career statistics ==
As of 5 April 2024

Appearances and goals by club, season and competition
Club	Season	League			National cup		Other		Total	
Club	Season	Division	Apps	Goals	Apps	Goals	Apps	Goals	Apps	Goals
Ull/Kisa	2017	1. divisjon	20	0	1	0	1 (Note: Appearances in Eliteserien play-offs)	0	22	0
Ull/Kisa	2018	1. divisjon	27	1	2	0	1	0	30	1
Ull/Kisa	2019	1. divisjon	23	0	2	0	—		25	0
Ull/Kisa	2020	1. divisjon	16	1	—		—		16	1
Ull/Kisa	Total		86	2	5	0	2	0	93	2
Mjøndalen	2021	Eliteserien	28	2	0	0	—		28	2
Haugesund	2022	Eliteserien	27	1	3	0	—		30	1
Stabæk (loan)	2023	Eliteserien	21	1	1	0	—		22	1
Stabæk (loan)	2024	1. divisjon	1	0	0	0	—		1	0
Stabæk (loan)	Total		22	1	1	0	—		23	1
Career total			163	6	9	0	2	0	174	6
