= Enzo Philibert =

French footballer (born 2002)

Personal information
- Date of birth: 13 May 2002 (age 24)
- Place of birth: Marseille, France
- Height: 1.82 m (6 ft 0 in)
- Position: Centre-back

Team information
- Current team: Pays de Grasse
- Number: 5

Youth career
- Burel FC
- Salon Bel Air
- Bastia

Senior career*
Years	Team	Apps	(Gls)
2020–2021	Nîmes II	8	(0)
2021–2022	Nîmes	4	(0)
2023	Jerv	14	(1)
2024–	Pays de Grasse	9	(0)
- * Club domestic league appearances and goals as of 9 November 2024

Enzo Philibert (born 13 May 2002) is a French professional footballer who plays as a centre-back for Championnat National 1 club Pays de Grasse.

Philibert came through several youth academies, notably Burel FC, Salon Bel Air, SC Air Bel, Bastia, and later Nîmes Olympique. He made his senior breakthrough with Nîmes II in 2020 and later featured with the first team in Ligue 2.

In 2023, he moved abroad, signing with Norwegian side FK Jerv, where he gained experience in the 1. Divisjon. On 16 July 2024, Philibert joined RC Pays de Grasse, returning to France to compete in National 2.

== Club career ==
A youth product of Burel FC, Salon Bel Air and Bastia, Philibert began his senior career with the reserves of Nîmes in 2020. He made his professional debut with Nîmes in a 2–0 Ligue 2 loss to Paris FC on 21 September 2021.

On 2 December 2023, Philibert and FK Jerv agreed to terminate the contract.
