= Vitor Hugo (footballer, born 2003) =

Brazilian footballer

Vitinho
Personal information
- Full name: Vitor Hugo Ferreira Oliveira
- Date of birth: 25 March 2003 (age 23)
- Place of birth: Esmeraldas, Brazil
- Height: 1.81 m (5 ft 11 in)
- Position: Winger

Team information
- Current team: Santa Clara
- Number: 27

Youth career
- –2021: Novorizontino
- 2021: Palmeiras

Senior career*
Years	Team	Apps	(Gls)
2021–2026	Palmeiras	2	(0)
2023	→ Vålerenga (loan)	4	(0)
2024–2025	→ Novorizontino (loan)	2	(0)
2026–	Santa Clara	0	(0)
- * Club domestic league appearances and goals as of 16 May 2026

Vitor Hugo Ferreira Oliveira (born 25 March 2003), known as Vitor Hugo or Vitinho, is a Brazilian professional footballer who plays for Portuguese Primeira Liga club Santa Clara.

== Club career ==
Vitor Hugo made his professional debut for Palmeiras on the 6 December 2021, starting the Serie A game against Athletico Paranaense, and playing the full 90 minutes of this 0–0 away draw.

== Career statistics ==
As of match played 15 January 2025

Appearances and goals by club, season and competition
Club	Season	League			State league		National cup (Note: Includes Copa do Brasil, Norwegian Cup)		Continental		Other		Total	
Club	Season	Division	Apps	Goals	Apps	Goals	Apps	Goals	Apps	Goals	Apps	Goals	Apps	Goals
Novorizontino	2020	Série D	0	0	0	0	0	0	—		—		0	0
Palmeiras	2021	Série A	2	0	0	0	0	0	0	0	0	0	2	0
Palmeiras	2022	Série A	0	0	0	0	0	0	0	0	—		0	0
Palmeiras	Total		2	0	0	0	0	0	0	0	0	0	2	0
Vålerenga (loan)	2023	Eliteserien	4	0	—		1	0	—		0	0	5	0
Vålerenga 2 (loan)	2023	Norwegian Second Division	17	2	—		—		—		—		17	2
Novorizontino (loan)	2024	Série B	0	0	1 (Note: Appearance(s) in Campeonato Paulista)	0	—		—		—		1	0
Novorizontino (loan)	2025	Série B	0	0	1	0	0	0	—		—		1	0
Novorizontino (loan)	Total		0	0	2	0	0	0	0	0	0	0	2	0
Career total			23	2	2	0	1	0	0	0	0	0	26	2
