= Isak Pettersson =

Swedish footballer (born 1997)

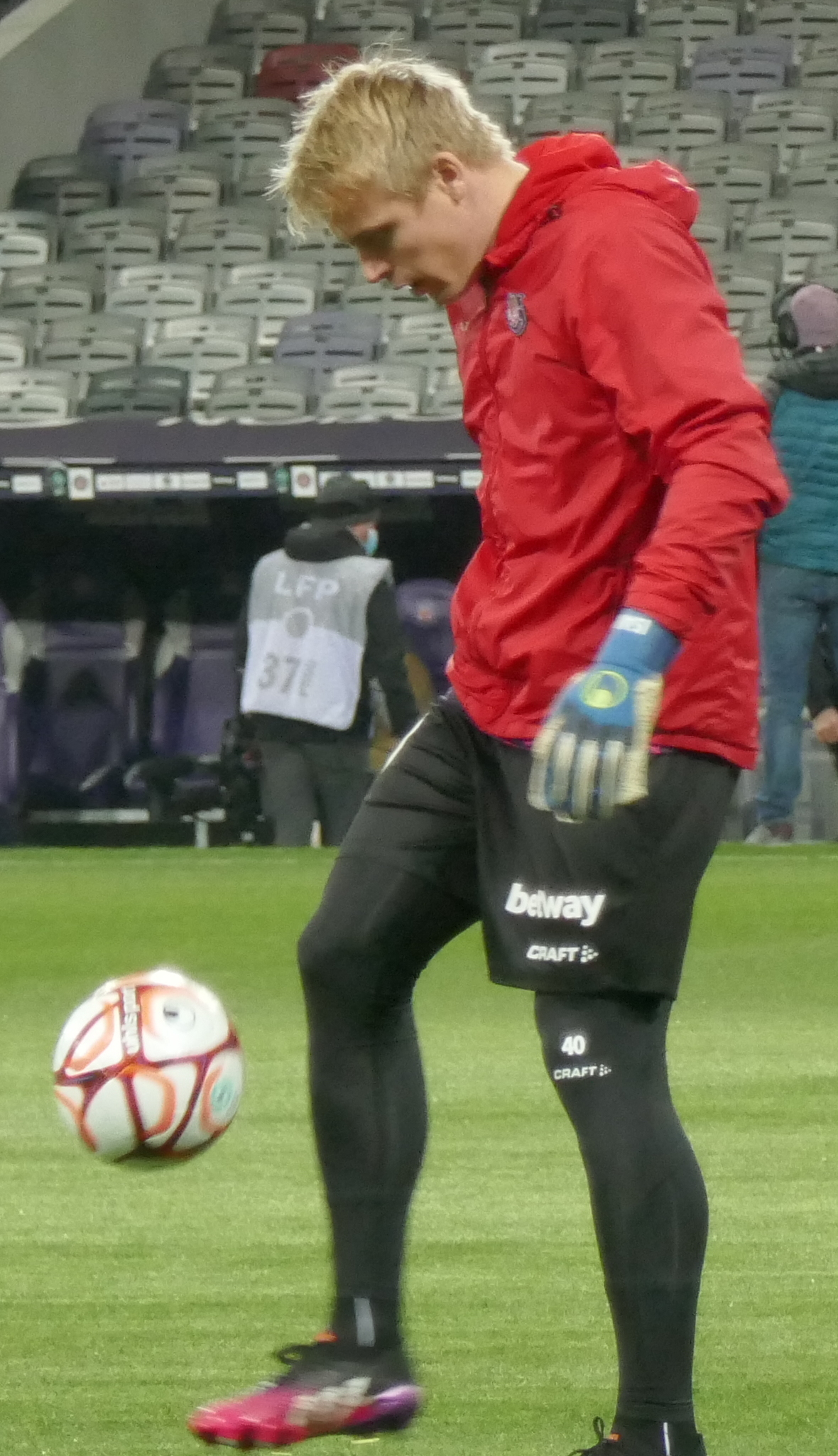

Personal information
- Full name: Carl Isak Emanuel Pettersson
- Date of birth: 6 June 1997 (age 29)
- Place of birth: Halmstad, Sweden
- Height: 1.81 m (5 ft 11 in)
- Position: Goalkeeper

Team information
- Current team: Elfsborg
- Number: 31

Youth career
- –2013: Genevad/Veinge IF
- 2013–2015: Halmstads BK

Senior career*
Years	Team	Apps	(Gls)
2015–2017	Halmstads BK	26	(0)
2016	→ Östers IF (loan)	11	(0)
2018–2020	IFK Norrköping	90	(0)
2021–2023	Toulouse	1	(0)
2021–2023	Toulouse B	4	(0)
2023	Stabæk	30	(0)
2024–	Elfsborg	41	(0)

International career^{‡}
2015–2017	Sweden U19	4	(0)
2019–2020	Sweden	2	(0)
- * Club domestic league appearances and goals as of 8 July 2026 ‡ National team caps and goals as of 20:03, 7 November 2022 (UTC)

Carl Isak Emanuel Pettersson (born 6 June 1997) is a Swedish professional footballer who plays as a goalkeeper for Allsvenskan club Elfsborg.

== Club career ==
Pettersson was signed to Halmstads BK from 2016 to 2018, after playing in their U17, U18 and U19 youth leagues. He went on loan to Östers IF for three months in 2016. In 2018, he signed to IFK Norrköping as a free transfer until 31 December 2020.

In 2018, Pettersson won "Goalkeeper of the Year" at the annual Allsvenskans Stora Pris which nominates the best Swedish footballers in the country. He won "Goalkeeper of the Year" again in 2019 for his second consecutive year.

On 5 January 2021, Pettersson signed a contract with Ligue 2 club Toulouse.

On 31 January 2023, Pettersson joined Stabæk in Norway until the end of 2023.

== International career ==
Pettersson made his debut for the Sweden national team on 11 January 2019 in a friendly against Iceland, as a half-time substitute for Oscar Linnér.

== Career statistics ==
As of games played 26 March 2022

Appearances and goals by club, season and competition
Club	Season	League			National Cup		Other		Total	
Club	Season	Division	Apps	Goals	Apps	Goals	Apps	Goals	Apps	Goals
Halmstads BK	2016	Superettan	0	0	1	0	—		1	0
Halmstads BK	2017	Allsvenskan	26	0	2	0	—		28	0
Halmstads BK	Total		26	0	3	0	—		29	0
Östers IF (loan)	2016	Division 1 Södra	11	0	—		—		11	0
IFK Norrköping	2018	Allsvenskan	30	0	2	0	—		32	0
IFK Norrköping	2019	Allsvenskan	30	0	2	0	6 (Note: Appearances in the Europa League)	0	38	0
IFK Norrköping	2020	Allsvenskan	30	0	3	0	—		33	0
IFK Norrköping	Total		90	0	7	0	6	0	103	0
Toulouse	2020–21	Ligue 2	1	0	3	0	0	0	4	0
Toulouse	2021–22	Ligue 2	0	0	5	0	—		5	0
Toulouse	Total		1	0	8	0	0	0	9	0
Toulouse B	2021–22	Championnat National 3	3	0	—		—		3	0
Career total			131	0	18	0	6	0	155	0
